= Ukraine women's national water polo team =

Ukraine
- FINA code: UKR
- Association: Ukrainian Swimming Federation
- Confederation: LEN (Europe)

The Ukraine women's national water polo team represents Ukraine in international women's water polo competitions. The team has never qualified for a major international event (Olympics, World and European Championships). In 2023, the team debuted in the World Cup. The team never competed in the World League.

== Summer Olympics qualification tournaments ==
Ukraine women's national team qualified for the 2007 Women's European Water Polo Olympic Qualifier but finished last after losing all games.

== European Championships qualification tournaments ==
Ukraine women's national team debuted in the qualification for the 1999 European Championships. The team played in group B and lost all their matches (against Greece, Germany, and Great Britain).

In 2006, the team played in the qualifiers but finished last in their group (behind Greece, Spain, and Czech Republic).

During the 2012 qualifiers, Ukraine managed to secure two victories against Israel but lost to Spain and Great Britain, thus losing chances to qualify for the European Championships. Ukraine was drafted for the 2014 qualifiers in the group with the Netherlands, Great Britain, Portugal, and Israel. One victory over Israel was not enough to get through to the continental championships. Ukraine did not enter the qualifications for the 2016 European Championships.

In the playoffs of the 2018 qualifiers, Ukraine lost both matches (8–10 and 1–6) to Serbia after having hosted the Qualifying round 1 in Kyiv. The next qualifiers were unsuccessful, too. Ukraine did not manage to overcome France. During the 2022 qualifiers, Ukraine managed to play a draw with Ireland only and finished behind Germany, Romania, and Slovakia (the first two qualified for the Europeans).

Ukraine is expected to face Serbia and the Czech Republic in the first round of the 2024 qualifiers.

== Competitive record ==
=== FINA World League ===
- 2023 – 8th place (Division 2)

=== European Water Polo Championship ===
Year	P	W	D	L	GF	GA	GD	Rank	P	W	D	L	GF	GA	GD	Rank	
1993 (United Kingdom) Leeds	Did not enter								1993–1997	No separate qualification							
1995 (Austria) Vienna	Did not enter								1993–1997	No separate qualification							
1997 (Spain) Sevilla	Did not enter								1993–1997	No separate qualification							
1999 (Italy) Prato	Did not qualify								1999	3	0	0	3	23	46	−23	4/4
2001 (Hungary) Budapest	Did not qualify								2001	3	0	0	3	8	28	−20	4/4
2003 (Slovenia) Ljubljana	Did not qualify								2003	3	0	0	3	18	51	−33	4/4
2006 (Serbia) Belgrade	Did not qualify								2006	3	0	0	3	16	52	−36	4/4
2008 (Spain) Málaga	Did not qualify								2008	3	0	0	3	12	39	−17	4/4
2010 (Croatia) Zagreb	Did not qualify								2010	3	0	0	3	11	51	−40	4/4
2012 (Netherlands) Eindhoven	Did not qualify								2012	6	2	0	4	57	93	−36	3/4
2014 (Hungary) Budapest	Did not qualify								2014	4	1	0	3	23	64	−41	4/5
2016 (Serbia) Belgrade	Did not enter								2016	Did not enter							
2018 (Spain) Barcelona	Did not qualify								2018	8	3	0	5	53	51	+2	4/7 + play-off
2020 (Hungary) Budapest	Did not qualify								2020	7	0	1	6	35	75	−40	6/6 + play-off
2022 (Croatia) Split	Did not qualify								2022	4	0	1	3	28	57	−29	4/5
2024 (Netherlands) Eindhoven	Did not qualify								2024	2	0	0	2	8	32	−24	3/3
2026 (Serbia) Belgrade	Did not qualify								2026	3	1	0	2	29	35	−6	3/4

=== European B Championships ===
Year	P	W	D	L	GF	GA	GD	Rank	ECh Qual	P	W	D	L	GF	GA	GD	Rank
1996 (Portugal) Lisbon	4	1	0	3	19	28	−9	4/7	1996–2002	No qualification							
1998 (Czech Republic) Prague	5	?	?	?	??	??	?	4/9	1996–2002	No qualification							
2000 (Denmark) Odense	5	3	0	2	35	29	+6	2/8	1996–2002	No qualification							
2002 (Czech Republic) Prague	5	4	0	1	39	28	+11	2/8	1996–2002	No qualification							
2004 (France) Nancy	6	3	0	3	40	32	+8	3/8	2004	Bye							
2007 (Czech Republic) Prague	6	5	0	1	78	37	+41	3/9	2007–2009	No qualification							
2009 (United Kingdom) Manchester	6	3	0	3	57	53	+4	3/8	2007–2009	No qualification							

== Head-to-head record ==
As of 25 June 2023. The data is incomplete since the results of the 1998 (Ireland, Great Britain, Czech Republic, Belarus - semifinal, Czech Republic - final) European B Championships are missing. The statistics considers all games played in the qualification for European Championships since 1999, European B Championships since 1996, 2008 European Water Polo Olympic Qualifier as well as 2023 FINA Women's Water Polo World Cup.

Against	Played	Won	Drawn	Lost	GF	GA	GD
Belarus	3	3	0	0	25	12	+13
Bulgaria	1	1	0	0	20	3	+17
Croatia	1	0	0	1	6	7	−1
Czech Republic	12	3	0	9	90	118	−28
Denmark	2	1	0	1	11	7	+4
France	6	0	0	6	26	78	−52
Germany	6	0	0	6	37	91	−54
(United Kingdom) Great Britain	9	1	0	8	51	96	−45
Greece	5	0	0	5	21	102	−81
(Republic of Ireland) Ireland	1	0	1	0	8	8	0
Israel	6	4	0	2	57	60	−3
Italy	2	0	0	2	8	41	−33
Malta	1	1	0	0	9	2	+7
Netherlands	1	0	0	1	2	26	−24
Portugal	6	3	0	3	43	45	−2
Romania	3	1	1	1	24	24	0
Serbia	3	0	0	3	10	35	−25
Serbia and Montenegro	1	0	0	1	7	8	−1
Slovakia	5	2	0	3	28	4	+24
South Africa	1	0	0	1	6	19	−13
Spain	5	0	0	5	27	97	−70
Sweden	1	0	0	1	5	7	−2
Switzerland	6	5	0	1	76	37	+39
Uzbekistan	1	0	0	1	10	11	−1
(Socialist Federal Republic of Yugoslavia) Yugoslavia	1	0	0	1	5	13	−8
Total: 25 nations	89	25	2	62	612	951	−339

== Junior and Youth national teams ==
Kamianske (officially Dniprodzerzhynsk at that time) hosted the 2010 European Women's U19 Championships. Ukraine finished 14th (last) at the tournament.
