= Water polo at the 2024 Summer Olympics – Women's qualification =

The women's qualification for the Olympic water polo tournament occurred between July 2023 and February 2024, allocating ten teams for the final tournament. As the host nation, France reserved a direct spot each for the women's team.

The remainder of the total quota was attributed to the eligible NOCs through a tripartite qualification pathway. First, the 2023 World Aquatics Championships, scheduled for 16 to 28 July in Fukuoka, Japan, produced the winners and runners-up of the women's water polo tournament qualifying for Paris 2024. Five more quota places were awarded to the highest-ranked eligible NOC at each of the continental meets (Africa, Americas, Asia, Europe, and Oceania) approved by World Aquatics. If any of the continental qualifying tournaments did not occur within the qualifying period, the vacant spot was entitled to the highest-ranked eligible NOC from a respective continent at the succeeding edition of the Worlds.

The last batch of quota places was assigned to the two highest-ranked eligible NOCs at the 2024 World Aquatics Championships in Doha, Qatar to complete the ten-team field for the Games.

== Qualification summary ==
Qualification	Date	Host	Berths	Qualified team
Host country	—		1	France
2023 World Aquatics Championships	16–28 July 2023	(Japan) Fukuoka	2	Netherlands
2023 World Aquatics Championships	16–28 July 2023	(Japan) Fukuoka	2	Spain
2023 Oceanian Qualifier Series	11–12 August 2023	(New Zealand) Auckland	1	Australia
2022 Asian Games	25 September – 1 October 2023	(China) Hangzhou	1	China
2023 Pan American Games	30 October – 4 November 2023	(Chile) Santiago	1	United States
2024 European Championships	5–13 January 2024	(Netherlands) Eindhoven	1	Greece
2024 World Aquatics Championships	4–16 February 2024	(Qatar) Doha	2	Hungary
2024 World Aquatics Championships	4–16 February 2024	(Qatar) Doha	2	Italy
2024 World Aquatics Championships – Africa	4–16 February 2024	(Qatar) Doha	~~1~~	~~South Africa~~
2024 World Aquatics Championships – Reallocation	4–16 February 2024	(Qatar) Doha	1	Canada (Note: South Africa withdrew from the tournament after the 2024 World Aquatics Championships. Canada, as the best non-qualified team, took their spot.)
Total			10	

== 2023 World Championships ==
The winner and the runner-up of the women's water polo tournament at the 2023 World Aquatics Championships in Fukuoka, Japan obtained a ticket for Paris 2024.

=== Group A ===
Pos	Team	Pld	W	PSW	PSL	L	GF	GA	GD	Pts	Qualification
1	United States	3	3	0	0	0	40	16	+24	9	Quarterfinals
2	Australia	3	2	0	0	1	26	24	+2	6	Playoffs
3	France	3	1	0	0	2	25	37	−12	3	Playoffs
4	China	3	0	0	0	3	24	38	−14	0	

Source: Sportresult
Rules for classification: 1) points; 2) head-to-head points; 3) head-to-head goal difference; 4) head-to-head number of goals scored; 5) Goal difference.

=== Group B ===
Pos	Team	Pld	W	PSW	PSL	L	GF	GA	GD	Pts	Qualification
1	Netherlands	3	3	0	0	0	61	16	+45	9	Quarterfinals
2	Spain	3	2	0	0	1	52	17	+35	6	Playoffs
3	Israel	3	1	0	0	2	30	52	−22	3	Playoffs
4	Kazakhstan	3	0	0	0	3	13	71	−58	0	

Source: Sportresult
Rules for classification: 1) points; 2) head-to-head points; 3) head-to-head goal difference; 4) head-to-head number of goals scored; 5) Goal difference.

=== Group C ===
Pos	Team	Pld	W	PSW	PSL	L	GF	GA	GD	Pts	Qualification
1	Greece	3	3	0	0	0	61	16	+45	9	Quarterfinals
2	Italy	3	2	0	0	1	63	19	+44	6	Playoffs
3	South Africa	3	1	0	0	2	16	57	−41	3	Playoffs
4	Argentina	3	0	0	0	3	12	60	−48	0	

Source: Sportresult
Rules for classification: 1) points; 2) head-to-head points; 3) head-to-head goal difference; 4) head-to-head number of goals scored; 5) Goal difference.

=== Group D ===
Pos	Team	Pld	W	PSW	PSL	L	GF	GA	GD	Pts	Qualification
1	Hungary	3	3	0	0	0	60	36	+24	9	Quarterfinals
2	Canada	3	2	0	0	1	40	34	+6	6	Playoffs
3	New Zealand	3	1	0	0	2	33	52	−19	3	Playoffs
4	Japan (H)	3	0	0	0	3	49	60	−11	0	

Source: Sportresult
Rules for classification: 1) points; 2) head-to-head points; 3) head-to-head goal difference; 4) head-to-head number of goals scored; 5) Goal difference.
(H) Host

=== Bracket ===
Playoffs
22 July
Italy	14
New Zealand	7
22 July
South Africa	6
Canada	21
22 July
Australia	16
Israel	7
22 July
France	9
Spain	16

Quarter-finals
24 July
United States	7
Italy	8
24 July
Netherlands	17
Canada	10
24 July
Greece	8
Australia	9
24 July
Hungary	9
Spain	12

Semi-finals
26 July
Italy	8
Netherlands	9
26 July
Australia	10
Spain	12

Final
28 July
Netherlands (PSO)	12 (5)
Spain	12 (4)
Third place
28 July
Italy	16
Australia	14

5th place bracket

5th–8th place semifinals
26 July
United States	16
Canada	4
26 July
Greece	9
Hungary	10

Fifth place game
28 July
United States (PSO)	11 (4)
Hungary	11 (2)
Seventh place game
28 July
Canada (PSO)	10 (4)
Greece	10 (2)

9th place bracket

9th–12th place semifinals
24 July
Israel	15
New Zealand	12
24 July
France	20
South Africa	6

Ninth place game
26 July
Israel	7
France	11
Eleventh place game
26 July
New Zealand	25
South Africa	6

13th place bracket

13th–16th place semifinals
22 July
China	16
Kazakhstan	6
22 July
Argentina	11
Japan	21

13th place game
24 July
China	18
Japan	10
15th place game
24 July
Kazakhstan	10
Argentina	8

=== Final standing ===
Rank	Team
1st place, gold medalist(s)	Netherlands
2nd place, silver medalist(s)	Spain
3rd place, bronze medalist(s)	Italy
4	Australia
5	United States
6	Hungary
7	Canada
8	Greece
9	France
10	Israel
11	New Zealand
12	South Africa
13	China
14	Japan
15	Kazakhstan
16	Argentina

== Continental tournaments ==
The highest-ranked eligible NOC from each of the five continental qualification tournaments (Africa, Americas, Asia, Europe, and Oceania) secured a quota place for Paris 2024. If any of the continental qualifying tournaments did not occur within the qualifying period, the vacant spot would be entitled to the highest-ranked eligible NOC from a respective continent at the succeeding edition of the Worlds.

=== Oceania ===
The 2023 Oceanian Qualifier Series was played between 11 and 12 August 2023, in Auckland, New Zealand.

Team 1	Agg.	Team 2	1st leg	2nd leg
New Zealand	8–32	Australia	3–17	5–15

=== Asia ===
Pos	Team	Pld	W	PW	PL	L	GF	GA	GD	Pts
1	China	6	6	0	0	0	155	38	+117	18
2	Japan	6	5	0	0	1	170	63	+107	15
3	Kazakhstan	6	4	0	0	2	87	66	+21	12
4	Singapore	6	3	0	0	3	59	90	−31	9
5	Thailand	6	2	0	0	4	70	96	−26	6
6	Uzbekistan	6	1	0	0	5	60	125	−65	3
7	South Korea	6	0	0	0	6	25	148	−123	0

Source: OCA

=== Europe ===
==== Group A ====
Pos	Team	Pld	W	PSW	PSL	L	GF	GA	GD	Pts	Qualification
1	Netherlands (H)	3	3	0	0	0	53	27	+26	9	Quarterfinals
2	Greece	3	2	0	0	1	49	35	+14	6	Quarterfinals
3	Hungary	3	1	0	0	2	40	30	+10	3	Playoffs
4	Croatia	3	0	0	0	3	16	66	−50	0	Playoffs

Source: LEN
Rules for classification: 1) points; 2) head-to-head points; 3) head-to-head goal difference; 4) head-to-head number of goals scored; 5) Goal difference.
(H) Host

==== Group B ====
Pos	Team	Pld	W	PSW	PSL	L	GF	GA	GD	Pts	Qualification
1	Spain	3	3	0	0	0	53	23	+30	9	Quarterfinals
2	Italy	3	2	0	0	1	40	31	+9	6	Quarterfinals
3	France	3	1	0	0	2	30	37	−7	3	Playoffs
4	Israel	3	0	0	0	3	26	58	−32	0	Playoffs

Source: LEN
Rules for classification: 1) points; 2) head-to-head points; 3) head-to-head goal difference; 4) head-to-head number of goals scored; 5) Goal difference.

==== Group C ====
Pos	Team	Pld	W	PSW	PSL	L	GF	GA	GD	Pts	Qualification
1	Serbia	3	3	0	0	0	43	14	+29	9	Playoffs
2	Czech Republic	3	2	0	0	1	27	36	−9	6	Playoffs
3	Romania	3	1	0	0	2	25	35	−10	3	Classification round
4	Turkey	3	0	0	0	3	22	32	−10	0	Classification round

Source: LEN
Rules for classification: 1) points; 2) head-to-head points; 3) head-to-head goal difference; 4) head-to-head number of goals scored; 5) Goal difference.

==== Group D ====
Pos	Team	Pld	W	PSW	PSL	L	GF	GA	GD	Pts	Qualification
1	Great Britain	3	3	0	0	0	43	19	+24	9	Playoffs
2	Germany	3	2	0	0	1	47	31	+16	6	Playoffs
3	Slovakia	3	1	0	0	2	40	32	+8	3	Classification round
4	Bulgaria	3	0	0	0	3	23	71	−48	0	Classification round

Source: LEN
Rules for classification: 1) points; 2) head-to-head points; 3) head-to-head goal difference; 4) head-to-head number of goals scored; 5) Goal difference.

==== Bracket ====
Play-offs
8 January
Croatia	11
Serbia	8
8 January
France	14
Germany	6
8 January
Israel	9 (4)
Great Britain (PSO)	9 (5)
8 January
Hungary	27
Czech Republic	4

Quarter-finals
9 January
Spain	17
Croatia	6
9 January
Greece	15
France	7
9 January
Netherlands	25
Great Britain	6
9 January
Italy	12
Hungary	11

Semi-finals
11 January
Spain	13
Greece	5
11 January
Netherlands	7
Italy	6

Final
13 January
Spain	7
Netherlands	8
Third place
13 January
Greece	7
Italy	6

==== Final standing ====
Rank	Team
1st place, gold medalist(s)	Netherlands
2nd place, silver medalist(s)	Spain
3rd place, bronze medalist(s)	Greece
4	Italy
5	Hungary
6	France
7	Great Britain
8	Croatia
9	Israel
10	Serbia
11	Germany
12	Czech Republic
13	Turkey
14	Romania
15	Slovakia
16	Bulgaria

=== Americas ===
==== Pool A ====
Pos	Team	Pld	W	PSW	PSL	L	GF	GA	GD	Pts	Qualification
1	Canada	3	3	0	0	0	70	19	+51	9	Quarterfinals
2	Argentina	3	1	1	0	1	35	37	−2	5	Quarterfinals
3	Cuba	3	1	0	1	1	34	53	−19	4	Quarterfinals
4	Mexico	3	0	0	0	3	24	54	−30	0	Quarterfinals

Source: Santiago 2023
Rules for classification: 1) points; 2) head-to-head points; 3) head-to-head goal difference; 4) head-to-head number of goals scored; 5) goal difference.

==== Pool B ====
Pos	Team	Pld	W	PSW	PSL	L	GF	GA	GD	Pts	Qualification
1	United States	3	3	0	0	0	89	3	+86	9	Quarterfinals
2	Brazil	3	2	0	0	1	53	34	+19	6	Quarterfinals
3	Puerto Rico	3	1	0	0	2	21	60	−39	3	Quarterfinals
4	Chile (H)	3	0	0	0	3	14	80	−66	0	Quarterfinals

Source: Santiago 2023
Rules for classification: 1) points; 2) head-to-head points; 3) head-to-head goal difference; 4) head-to-head number of goals scored; 5) goal difference.
(H) Host

==== Bracket ====
Quarterfinals
2 November
Argentina	13
Puerto Rico	11
2 November
Mexico	1
United States	32
2 November
Cuba	10
Brazil	12
2 November
Canada	33
Chile	2

Semifinals
3 November
Argentina	1
United States	27
3 November
Brazil	4
Canada	21

Gold medal match
4 November
United States	20
Canada	11
Bronze medal match
4 November
Argentina	9
Brazil	10

5–8th place semifinals
3 November
Puerto Rico	9
Mexico	10
3 November
Cuba	15
Chile	13

Fifth place
4 November
Mexico	15
Cuba	11
Seventh place
4 November
Puerto Rico	18
Chile	13

==== Final standing ====
Rank	Team
1st place, gold medalist(s)	United States
2nd place, silver medalist(s)	Canada
3rd place, bronze medalist(s)	Brazil
4	Argentina
5	Mexico
6	Cuba
7	Puerto Rico
8	Chile

== 2024 World Championships ==
The top two teams and the top African team of the women's water polo tournament at the 2024 World Aquatics Championships in Doha, Qatar obtained a ticket for Paris 2024.

=== Group A ===
Pos	Team	Pld	W	PSW	PSL	L	GF	GA	GD	Pts	Qualification
1	United States	3	3	0	0	0	63	16	+47	9	Quarterfinals
2	Netherlands	3	2	0	0	1	62	19	+43	6	Playoffs
3	Kazakhstan	3	0	1	0	2	17	69	−52	2	Playoffs
4	Brazil	3	0	0	1	2	20	58	−38	1	13–16th place semifinals

Source: World Aquatics
Rules for classification: 1) points; 2) head-to-head points; 3) head-to-head goal difference; 4) head-to-head number of goals scored; 5) Goal difference.

=== Group B ===
Pos	Team	Pld	W	PSW	PSL	L	GF	GA	GD	Pts	Qualification
1	Spain	3	3	0	0	0	48	20	+28	9	Quarterfinals
2	Greece	3	2	0	0	1	41	31	+10	6	Playoffs
3	China	3	0	1	0	2	20	46	−26	2	Playoffs
4	France	3	0	0	1	2	19	31	−12	1	13–16th place semifinals

Source: World Aquatics
Rules for classification: 1) points; 2) head-to-head points; 3) head-to-head goal difference; 4) head-to-head number of goals scored; 5) Goal difference.

=== Group C ===
Pos	Team	Pld	W	PSW	PSL	L	GF	GA	GD	Pts	Qualification
1	Hungary	3	3	0	0	0	71	19	+52	9	Quarterfinals
2	Australia	3	2	0	0	1	54	20	+34	6	Playoffs
3	New Zealand	3	1	0	0	2	44	36	+8	3	Playoffs
4	Singapore	3	0	0	0	3	7	101	−94	0	13–16th place semifinals

Source: World Aquatics
Rules for classification: 1) points; 2) head-to-head points; 3) head-to-head goal difference; 4) head-to-head number of goals scored; 5) Goal difference.

=== Group D ===
Pos	Team	Pld	W	PSW	PSL	L	GF	GA	GD	Pts	Qualification
1	Italy	3	3	0	0	0	59	21	+38	9	Quarterfinals
2	Canada	3	2	0	0	1	52	19	+33	6	Playoffs
3	Great Britain	3	1	0	0	2	29	47	−18	3	Playoffs
4	South Africa	3	0	0	0	3	10	63	−53	0	13–16th place semifinals

Source: World Aquatics
Rules for classification: 1) points; 2) head-to-head points; 3) head-to-head goal difference; 4) head-to-head number of goals scored; 5) Goal difference.

=== Bracket ===
Playoffs
10 February
Australia	20
Great Britain	8
10 February
New Zealand	12
Canada	14
10 February
Netherlands	16
China	14
10 February
Kazakhstan	5
Greece	24

Quarter-finals
12 February
United States	10
Australia	9
12 February
Spain	12
Canada	9
12 February
Hungary (PSO)	8 (5)
Netherlands	8 (4)
12 February
Italy	12
Greece	14

Semi-finals
14 February
United States	11
Spain	9
14 February
Hungary (PSO)	9 (4)
Greece	9 (2)

Final
16 February
United States	8
Hungary	7
Third place
16 February
Spain	10
Greece	9

5th place bracket

5th–8th place semifinals
14 February
Australia	10
Canada	8
14 February
Netherlands	10
Italy	5

Fifth place game
16 February
Australia	8
Netherlands	10
Seventh place game
16 February
Canada	12
Italy	18

9th place bracket

9th–12th place semifinals
12 February
China	15
Great Britain	10
12 February
Kazakhstan	8
New Zealand	23

Ninth place game
14 February
China	15
New Zealand	16
Eleventh place game
14 February
Great Britain	8
Kazakhstan	6

13th place bracket

13th–16th place semifinals
10 February
Brazil	8
France	17
10 February
Singapore	6
South Africa	20

13th place game
12 February
France	19
South Africa	8
15th place game
12 February
Brazil	18
Singapore	2

=== Final standing ===
Rank	Team
1st place, gold medalist(s)	United States
2nd place, silver medalist(s)	Hungary
3rd place, bronze medalist(s)	Spain
4	Greece
5	Netherlands
6	Australia
7	Italy
8	Canada
9	New Zealand
10	China
11	Great Britain
12	Kazakhstan
13	France
14	South Africa
15	Brazil
16	Singapore
