= 2018 Women's European Water Polo Championship Qualifiers =

2018 Women's European Water Polo Championship Qualifiers are series of qualification tournaments to decide the participants of the 2018 Women's European Water Polo Championship.

== Qualified teams ==
Teams directly qualified to the 2018 European Water Polo Championship:

- Hungary – winners of the 2016 Women's European Water Polo Championship
- Netherlands – runners-up of the 2016 Women's European Water Polo Championship
- Italy – 3rd place of the 2016 Women's European Water Polo Championship
- Spain – 4th place of the 2016 Women's European Water Polo Championship
- Greece – 5th place of the 2016 Women's European Water Polo Championship
- Russia – 6th place of the 2016 Women's European Water Polo Championship

== Qualifying round 1 ==
Team	Pld	W	D	L	GF	GA	GD	Pts
Slovakia	6	5	1	0	69	34	+35	16
Czech Republic	6	5	1	0	72	44	+28	16
Israel	6	4	0	2	66	37	+29	12
Ukraine	6	3	0	3	44	35	+9	9
Romania	6	2	0	4	34	53	–19	6
Switzerland	6	1	0	5	34	54	-20	3
Malta	6	0	0	6	21	83	-62	0

4 October 2017; 17:00	Malta	6–19	Israel	Kyiv

4 October 2017; 18:30	Romania	5–4	Switzerland	Kyiv

4 October 2017; 20:00	Ukraine	5–9	Slovakia	Kyiv

5 October 2017; 9:00	Romania	6–12	Czech Republic	Kyiv

5 October 2017; 10:30	Slovakia	13–3	Switzerland	Kyiv

5 October 2017; 12:00	Ukraine	6–8	Israel	Kyiv

5 October 2017; 17:00	Czech Republic	14–10	Switzerland	Kyiv

5 October 2017; 18:30	Malta	5–16	Slovakia	Kyiv

5 October 2017; 20:00	Romania	2–10	Ukraine	Kyiv

6 October 2017; 17:00	Switzerland	6–9	Ukraine	Kyiv

6 October 2017; 18:30	Israel	13–4	Romania	Kyiv

6 October 2017; 20:00	Czech Republic	18–5	Malta	Kyiv

7 October 2017; 9:00	Slovakia	13–4	Romania	Kyiv

7 October 2017; 10:30	Israel	8–10	Czech Republic	Kyiv

7 October 2017; 12:00	Switzerland	8–2	Malta	Kyiv

7 October 2017; 17:00	Israel	7–8	Slovakia	Kyiv

7 October 2017; 18:30	Malta	1–13	Romania	Kyiv

7 October 2017; 20:00	Czech Republic	8–5	Ukraine	Kyiv

8 October 2017; 9:00	Switzerland	3–11	Israel	Kyiv

8 October 2017; 10:30	Slovakia	10–10	Czech Republic	Kyiv

8 October 2017; 12:00	Ukraine	9–2	Malta	Kyiv

== Playoffs ==
From the qualification rond, six of the seven teams advance to the playoffs. These six teams will face the teams classified 7 to 12 in the latest edition of the tournament, the 2016 Women's European Water Polo Championship

Seeded	Unseeded
From the 2016 European Championship
France	Portugal
Germany	Croatia
Serbia	Turkey
From the qualifying round 1
Slovakia	Ukraine
Czech Republic	Romania
Israel	Switzerland

=== Playoffs ===
- 1st leg: 17 and 24 February 2018
- 2nd leg: 3 March 2018

Team 1	Agg.	Team 2	1st leg	2nd leg
Slovakia	20–21	Turkey	11–11	9–10
Czech Republic	15–23	Croatia	6–9	9–14
Israel	25–19	Portugal	14–10	11–9
Serbia	16–9	Ukraine	10–8	6–1
Germany	28–23	Romania	22–14	6–9
France	35–4	Switzerland	19–1	16–3
