= 2020 Women's European Water Polo Championship Qualifiers =

The 2020 Women's European Water Polo Championship Qualifiers are a series of qualification tournaments aimed to establish the participants of the 2020 Women's European Water Polo Championship. The matches were contested in April and October 2019.

== Qualification round ==
The six teams participating at the QR all advanced to the next stage; the final position of each team established the opponent in the Play-offs. The round was contested from 25 to 28 April 2019 in Rio Maior, Portugal.

Pos	Team	Pts	Pld	W	D	L	GF	GA	GD
1	Slovakia	15	5	5	0	0	65	38	+27
2	Portugal	12	5	4	0	1	66	53	+13
3	Switzerland	7	5	2	1	2	47	51	-4
4	Czech Republic	7	5	2	1	2	44	52	-8
5	Romania	1	5	0	1	4	39	53	-14
6	Ukraine	1	5	0	1	4	28	42	-14

25 April 2019; 17:00	Report	Romania	5–5	Ukraine	Rio Maior Sports Centre (Rio Maior); Referees: Silva (POR), Garcia (SUI)
25 April 2019; 17:00	Report	Score by quarters: 0–2, 2–1, 3–1, 0–1			Rio Maior Sports Centre (Rio Maior); Referees: Silva (POR), Garcia (SUI)
25 April 2019; 17:00	Report	3: Pilică	Goals	2: Melnychuk, Andrieieva	Rio Maior Sports Centre (Rio Maior); Referees: Silva (POR), Garcia (SUI)

25 April 2019; 18:30	Report	Slovakia	11–6	Czech Republic	Rio Maior Sports Centre (Rio Maior); Referees: Vyshnevska (UKR), Manea (ROU)
25 April 2019; 18:30	Report	Score by quarters: 1–1, 4–3, 4–1, 2–1			Rio Maior Sports Centre (Rio Maior); Referees: Vyshnevska (UKR), Manea (ROU)
25 April 2019; 18:30	Report	6: Stankovianska; 2: Kováčiková, Pecková	Goals	2: Hlavatá, Vomastková	Rio Maior Sports Centre (Rio Maior); Referees: Vyshnevska (UKR), Manea (ROU)

25 April 2019; 20:00	Report	Portugal	13–11	Switzerland	Rio Maior Sports Centre (Rio Maior); Referees: Horvath (SVK), Achladiotis (GRE)
25 April 2019; 20:00	Report	Score by quarters: 3–1, 5–4, 4–3, 1–3			Rio Maior Sports Centre (Rio Maior); Referees: Horvath (SVK), Achladiotis (GRE)
25 April 2019; 20:00	Report	5: Braga; 3: Nunes	Goals	4: Kohli; 2: De Feo, Kratzer	Rio Maior Sports Centre (Rio Maior); Referees: Horvath (SVK), Achladiotis (GRE)

26 April 2019; 09:00	Report	Czech Republic	10–8	Romania	Rio Maior Sports Centre (Rio Maior); Referees: Vyshnevska (UKR), Silva (POR)
26 April 2019; 09:00	Report	Score by quarters: 3–0, 2–3, 4–4, 1–1			Rio Maior Sports Centre (Rio Maior); Referees: Vyshnevska (UKR), Silva (POR)
26 April 2019; 09:00	Report	5: Hlavatá; 2: Bušauerová, Vopálková	Goals	2: Pilică, Szeghalmi, Carpatoarea	Rio Maior Sports Centre (Rio Maior); Referees: Vyshnevska (UKR), Silva (POR)

26 April 2019; 10:30	Report	Switzerland	8–17	Slovakia	Rio Maior Sports Centre (Rio Maior); Referees: Achladiotis (GRE), Manea (ROU)
26 April 2019; 10:30	Report	Score by quarters: 0–1, 3–3, 2–6, 3–7			Rio Maior Sports Centre (Rio Maior); Referees: Achladiotis (GRE), Manea (ROU)
26 April 2019; 10:30	Report	3: Buob; 2: Trynes	Goals	3: Kováčiková, Kolářová, Katlovská; 2: Kurucová, Kačková	Rio Maior Sports Centre (Rio Maior); Referees: Achladiotis (GRE), Manea (ROU)

26 April 2019; 12:00	Report	Ukraine	7–10	Portugal	Rio Maior Sports Centre (Rio Maior); Referees: Garcia (SUI), Horvath (SVK)
26 April 2019; 12:00	Report	Score by quarters: 1–4, 1–3, 3–1, 2–2			Rio Maior Sports Centre (Rio Maior); Referees: Garcia (SUI), Horvath (SVK)
26 April 2019; 12:00	Report	2: Aboimova, Melnychuk	Goals	5: Nunes; 2: Braga	Rio Maior Sports Centre (Rio Maior); Referees: Garcia (SUI), Horvath (SVK)

26 April 2019; 17:00	Report	Romania	9–16	Slovakia	Rio Maior Sports Centre (Rio Maior); Referees: Silva (POR), Achladiotis (GRE)
26 April 2019; 17:00	Report	Score by quarters: 2–6, 2–4, 2–3, 3–3			Rio Maior Sports Centre (Rio Maior); Referees: Silva (POR), Achladiotis (GRE)
26 April 2019; 17:00	Report	4: Toth; 2: Mihaila	Goals	4: Stankovianska; 2: Kurucová	Rio Maior Sports Centre (Rio Maior); Referees: Silva (POR), Achladiotis (GRE)

26 April 2019; 18:30	Report	Ukraine	6–11	Switzerland	Rio Maior Sports Centre (Rio Maior); Referees: Manea (ROU), Horvath (SVK)
26 April 2019; 18:30	Report	Score by quarters: 0–2, 0–2, 2–5, 4–2			Rio Maior Sports Centre (Rio Maior); Referees: Manea (ROU), Horvath (SVK)
26 April 2019; 18:30	Report	3: Telypko	Goals	2: De Feo, Kratzer, Trynes; Adler, C. Carballo	Rio Maior Sports Centre (Rio Maior); Referees: Manea (ROU), Horvath (SVK)

26 April 2019; 20:00	Report	Portugal	18–11	Czech Republic	Rio Maior Sports Centre (Rio Maior); Referees: Vyshnevska (UKR), Garcia (SUI)
26 April 2019; 20:00	Report	Score by quarters: 5–3, 5–3, 2–2, 6–3			Rio Maior Sports Centre (Rio Maior); Referees: Vyshnevska (UKR), Garcia (SUI)
26 April 2019; 20:00	Report	7: Nunes; 3: Duarte	Goals	7: Hlavatá; 2: Bušauerová	Rio Maior Sports Centre (Rio Maior); Referees: Vyshnevska (UKR), Garcia (SUI)

27 April 2019; 17:00	Report	Czech Republic	8–6	Ukraine	Rio Maior Sports Centre (Rio Maior); Referees: Garcia (SUI), Silva (POR)
27 April 2019; 17:00	Report	Score by quarters: 3–2, 1–1, 1–1, 3–2			Rio Maior Sports Centre (Rio Maior); Referees: Garcia (SUI), Silva (POR)
27 April 2019; 17:00	Report	4: Votavová; 2: Vomastková	Goals	2: Andrieieva, Telpyko	Rio Maior Sports Centre (Rio Maior); Referees: Garcia (SUI), Silva (POR)

27 April 2019; 18:30	Report	Romania	6–8	Switzerland	Rio Maior Sports Centre (Rio Maior); Referees: Horvath (SVK), Vyshnevska (UKR)
27 April 2019; 18:30	Report	Score by quarters: 2–1, 2–1, 2–3, 0–3			Rio Maior Sports Centre (Rio Maior); Referees: Horvath (SVK), Vyshnevska (UKR)
27 April 2019; 18:30	Report	3: Pilică; 2: Mihaila	Goals	2: D. Carballo, Kohli	Rio Maior Sports Centre (Rio Maior); Referees: Horvath (SVK), Vyshnevska (UKR)

27 April 2019; 20:00	Report	Portugal	11–13	Slovakia	Rio Maior Sports Centre (Rio Maior); Referees: Manea (ROU), Achladiotis (GRE)
27 April 2019; 20:00	Report	Score by quarters: 3–3, 4–4, 1–4, 3–2			Rio Maior Sports Centre (Rio Maior); Referees: Manea (ROU), Achladiotis (GRE)
27 April 2019; 20:00	Report	4: Nunes, Braga; 2: Teixeira	Goals	4: Katlovská; 3: Kováčiková, Pecková	Rio Maior Sports Centre (Rio Maior); Referees: Manea (ROU), Achladiotis (GRE)

28 April 2019; 08:30	Report	Switzerland	9–9	Czech Republic	Rio Maior Sports Centre (Rio Maior); Referees: Silva (POR), Manea (ROU)
28 April 2019; 08:30	Report	Score by quarters: 1–2, 1–3, 4–2, 3–2			Rio Maior Sports Centre (Rio Maior); Referees: Silva (POR), Manea (ROU)
28 April 2019; 08:30	Report	3: Kohli; 2: Trynes	Goals	4: Bušauerová; 2: Vopálková	Rio Maior Sports Centre (Rio Maior); Referees: Silva (POR), Manea (ROU)

28 April 2019; 10:00	Report	Portugal	14–11	Romania	Rio Maior Sports Centre (Rio Maior); Referees: Vyshnevska (UKR), Horvath (SVK)
28 April 2019; 10:00	Report	Score by quarters: 3–1, 5–5, 4–4, 2–1			Rio Maior Sports Centre (Rio Maior); Referees: Vyshnevska (UKR), Horvath (SVK)
28 April 2019; 10:00	Report	5: Nunes; 3: Reis, Braga	Goals	8: Szeghalmi	Rio Maior Sports Centre (Rio Maior); Referees: Vyshnevska (UKR), Horvath (SVK)

28 April 2019; 11:30	Report	Ukraine	4–8	Slovakia	Rio Maior Sports Centre (Rio Maior); Referees: Garcia (SUI), Achladiotis (GRE)
28 April 2019; 11:30	Report	Score by quarters: 1–1, 2–3, 0–0, 1–4			Rio Maior Sports Centre (Rio Maior); Referees: Garcia (SUI), Achladiotis (GRE)
28 April 2019; 11:30	Report	2: Aboymova	Goals	3: Pecková; 2: Stankovianska	Rio Maior Sports Centre (Rio Maior); Referees: Garcia (SUI), Achladiotis (GRE)

== Play-offs ==
The teams ranked from 7th to 12th place at the 2018 EC directly qualified to this stage. The order of play was drawn on 8 June 2019; matchdays are 12 and 26 October 2019.

Team 1	Agg.	Team 2	1st leg	2nd leg
France	33–7	Ukraine	20–1	13–6
Romania	25–27 (p)	Germany	14–13	11–14 (p)
Czech Republic	14–44	Serbia	6–25	8–19
Israel	29–16	Switzerland	13–6	16–10
Portugal	18–22	Croatia	13–14	5–8
Slovakia	35–18	Turkey	19–9	16–9

=== First leg ===
12 October 2019; 16:00	Match 4	Israel	13–6	Switzerland	Olympic Pool (Netanya); Referees: Alves (POR), Mihalkovicova (SVK)
12 October 2019; 16:00	Match 4	Score by quarters: 2–2, 5–2, 5–0, 1–2			Olympic Pool (Netanya); Referees: Alves (POR), Mihalkovicova (SVK)
12 October 2019; 16:00	Match 4	4: Strugo; 3: Felix	Goals	3: Kohli; 2: Velikova	Olympic Pool (Netanya); Referees: Alves (POR), Mihalkovicova (SVK)

12 October 2019; 17:00	Match 5	Portugal	13–14	Croatia	Piscinas do Jamor (Lisbon); Referees: Blanchard (FRA), Arslanyan (TUR)
12 October 2019; 17:00	Match 5	Score by quarters: 3–2, 4–4, 2–4, 4–4			Piscinas do Jamor (Lisbon); Referees: Blanchard (FRA), Arslanyan (TUR)
12 October 2019; 17:00	Match 5	5: Braga; 2: Reis, Nunes	Goals	7: Miljković; 4: D. Butić	Piscinas do Jamor (Lisbon); Referees: Blanchard (FRA), Arslanyan (TUR)

12 October 2019; 18:30	Match 3	Czech Republic	6–25	Serbia	Plavecký stadion Podolí (Prague); Referees: Manea (ROU), Seidel (GER)
12 October 2019; 18:30	Match 3	Score by quarters: 1–9, 1–6, 3–6, 1–4			Plavecký stadion Podolí (Prague); Referees: Manea (ROU), Seidel (GER)
12 October 2019; 18:30	Match 3	2: Kreuzová	Goals	7: Gluščević; 4: Vuković	Plavecký stadion Podolí (Prague); Referees: Manea (ROU), Seidel (GER)

12 October 2019; 19:00	Match 1	France	20–1	Ukraine	Pôle Aquatique de Châlons-en-Champagne (Châlons-en-Champagne); Referees: Ortega (ESP), Wengenroth (SUI)
12 October 2019; 19:00	Match 1	Score by quarters: 4–0, 6–0, 3–1, 7–0			Pôle Aquatique de Châlons-en-Champagne (Châlons-en-Champagne); Referees: Ortega (ESP), Wengenroth (SUI)
12 October 2019; 19:00	Match 1	6: Guillet; 4: Daule	Goals	1: Aboimova	Pôle Aquatique de Châlons-en-Champagne (Châlons-en-Champagne); Referees: Ortega (ESP), Wengenroth (SUI)

12 October 2019; 19:00	Match 2	Romania	14–13	Germany	Bazinul Olimpic de la Focșani (Focșani); Referees: Franulović (CRO), Schwartz (ISR)
12 October 2019; 19:00	Match 2	Score by quarters: 2–4, 4–4, 5–2, 3–3			Bazinul Olimpic de la Focșani (Focșani); Referees: Franulović (CRO), Schwartz (ISR)
12 October 2019; 19:00	Match 2	5: Szeghalmi; 3: Pilică	Goals	3: G. Deike, Stiefel; 2: I. Deike, Krukenberg	Bazinul Olimpic de la Focșani (Focșani); Referees: Franulović (CRO), Schwartz (ISR)

12 October 2019; 19:00	Match 6	Slovakia	19–9	Turkey	Mestská krytá plaváreň (Košice); Referees: Milović (SRB), Goncharenko (UKR)
12 October 2019; 19:00	Match 6	Score by quarters: 5–4, 5–1, 5–1, 4–3			Mestská krytá plaváreň (Košice); Referees: Milović (SRB), Goncharenko (UKR)
12 October 2019; 19:00	Match 6	4: Stankovianska; 3: Kurucová	Goals	3: Buralı, Kuş; 2: Cengiz	Mestská krytá plaváreň (Košice); Referees: Milović (SRB), Goncharenko (UKR)

=== Second leg ===
26 October 2019; 16:00	Match 2	Germany	14–11 (PSO) (PSO)	Romania	Schwimmstadion Duisburg (Duisburg); Referees: Silva (POR), Radič (SVK)
26 October 2019; 16:00	Match 2	Score by quarters: 1–2, 2–3, 2–2, 5–2 PSO: 4-2			Schwimmstadion Duisburg (Duisburg); Referees: Silva (POR), Radič (SVK)
26 October 2019; 16:00	Match 2	4: Fry; 3: I. Deike, Stiefel	Goals	5: Szeghalmi; 4: Mihăilă	Schwimmstadion Duisburg (Duisburg); Referees: Silva (POR), Radič (SVK)

26 October 2019; 18:00	Match 4	Switzerland	10–16	Israel	Sportarena Campus Sursee (Oberkirch); Referees: Copić(CRO), Grandin (FRA)
26 October 2019; 18:00	Match 4	Score by quarters: 3–4, 3–3, 2–5, 2–4			Sportarena Campus Sursee (Oberkirch); Referees: Copić(CRO), Grandin (FRA)
26 October 2019; 18:00	Match 4	3: Kohli; 2: De Feo, Kratzer	Goals	6: Strugo; 5: Bogachenko	Sportarena Campus Sursee (Oberkirch); Referees: Copić(CRO), Grandin (FRA)

26 October 2019; 18:00	Match 5	Croatia	8–5	Portugal	Bazeni Crnica (Šibenik); Referees: Çakırgil (TUR), Mareš (CZE)
26 October 2019; 18:00	Match 5	Score by quarters: 3–3, 2–0, 1–1, 2–1			Bazeni Crnica (Šibenik); Referees: Çakırgil (TUR), Mareš (CZE)
26 October 2019; 18:00	Match 5	3: Butić; 2: Miljković	Goals	2: Lousa, Martins Machado	Bazeni Crnica (Šibenik); Referees: Çakırgil (TUR), Mareš (CZE)

26 October 2019; 19:00	Match 6	Turkey	9–16	Slovakia	Enka Kapalı Yüzme Havuzu (Istanbul); Referees: Georgescu (ROU), Schwartz (ISR)
26 October 2019; 19:00	Match 6	Score by quarters: 3–3, 2–5, 1–5, 3–3			Enka Kapalı Yüzme Havuzu (Istanbul); Referees: Georgescu (ROU), Schwartz (ISR)
26 October 2019; 19:00	Match 6	5: Kuş; 2: Elma	Goals	3: Kissová; 2: 5 players	Enka Kapalı Yüzme Havuzu (Istanbul); Referees: Georgescu (ROU), Schwartz (ISR)

26 October 2019; 19:30	Match 3	Serbia	19–8	Czech Republic	Sportski centar Milan Gale Muškatirović (Belgrade); Referees: Castrilli (SUI), Kapinus (UKR)
26 October 2019; 19:30	Match 3	Score by quarters: 3–2, 5–1, 5–1, 6–4			Sportski centar Milan Gale Muškatirović (Belgrade); Referees: Castrilli (SUI), Kapinus (UKR)
26 October 2019; 19:30	Match 3	5: Vuković; 4: Pantović, Mandić	Goals	4: Bušauerová; 3: Hlavatá	Sportski centar Milan Gale Muškatirović (Belgrade); Referees: Castrilli (SUI), Kapinus (UKR)

26 October 2019; 21:00	Match 1	Ukraine	6–13	France	NTU KhPI (Kharkiv); Referees: Anđelić (SRB), Mauss (GER)
26 October 2019; 21:00	Match 1	Score by quarters: 0–5, 1–4, 2–1, 3–3			NTU KhPI (Kharkiv); Referees: Anđelić (SRB), Mauss (GER)
26 October 2019; 21:00	Match 1	3: Melnychuk	Goals	4: Millot, Daule; 2: Battu, Dhalluin	NTU KhPI (Kharkiv); Referees: Anđelić (SRB), Mauss (GER)

== Qualified teams ==
- France
- Germany
- Serbia
- Israel
- Croatia
- Slovakia

Teams already qualified through the 2018 European Championship:

- Hungary – Host nation
- Netherlands – Winners of the 2018 European Championship
- Greece – Runners-up of the 2018 European Championship
- Spain – 3rd place at the 2018 European Championship
- Russia – 5th place at the 2018 European Championship
- Italy – 6th place at the 2018 European Championship

== See also ==
- 2020 Men's European Water Polo Championship Qualifiers
