= 2024 Women's European Water Polo Championship Qualifiers =

The tournaments for the qualification for the 2024 Women's European Water Polo Championship was held between 23 and 25 June 2023.

== Format ==
The 14 teams were split into two groups of four and two groups of three teams. The tournament was played at a single venue with the group winners and the second-ranked teams qualifying for the final tournament.

== Draw ==
The draw took place on 1 April 2023.

=== Seeding ===
The seeding was announced on 29 March 2023.

| Pot 1 | Pot 2 | Pot 3 |
|---|---|---|
| Serbia; Germany; Romania; Slovakia | Switzerland; Portugal; Turkey; Malta; Ukraine | Bulgaria; Czech Republic; Finland; Great Britain; Sweden |

== Groups ==
All times are (UTC+2).

=== Group A ===
| Pos | Team | Pld | W | D | L | GF | GA | GD | Pts | Qualification |
|---|---|---|---|---|---|---|---|---|---|---|
| 1 | Slovakia | 2 | 2 | 0 | 0 | 36 | 22 | +14 | 6 | Final tournament |
| 2 | Bulgaria (H) | 2 | 1 | 0 | 1 | 23 | 27 | −4 | 3 | Final tournament |
| 3 | Malta | 2 | 0 | 0 | 2 | 17 | 27 | −10 | 0 | |

Source: LEN
Rules for classification: 1) points; 2) head-to-head points; 3) head-to-head goal difference; 4) head-to-head number of goals scored; 5) Goal difference.
(H) Hosts

All times are local (UTC+3).

| 23 June 2023; 19:00 | Report | Bulgaria | 11–7 | Malta | Burgas; Referees: Miodrag Stefanović (SRB), Ivo Mareš (CZE) |
| 23 June 2023; 19:00 | Report | Score by quarters: 0–2, 2–1, 6–3, 3–1 | | | Burgas; Referees: Miodrag Stefanović (SRB), Ivo Mareš (CZE) |
| 23 June 2023; 19:00 | Report | Naneva 4 | Goals | Perici 2 | Burgas; Referees: Miodrag Stefanović (SRB), Ivo Mareš (CZE) |

| 24 June 2023; 19:00 | Report | Malta | 10–16 | Slovakia | Burgas; Referees: George Makharadze (UKR), Miodrag Stefanović (SRB) |
| 24 June 2023; 19:00 | Report | Score by quarters: 2–2, 1–5, 5–4, 2–5 | | | Burgas; Referees: George Makharadze (UKR), Miodrag Stefanović (SRB) |
| 24 June 2023; 19:00 | Report | Perici 3 | Goals | Pecková 4 | Burgas; Referees: George Makharadze (UKR), Miodrag Stefanović (SRB) |

| 25 June 2023; 12:30 | Report | Bulgaria | 12–20 | Slovakia | Burgas; Referees: Ivo Mareš (CZE), George Makharadze (UKR) |
| 25 June 2023; 12:30 | Report | Score by quarters: 5–4, 1–3, 2–7, 4–6 | | | Burgas; Referees: Ivo Mareš (CZE), George Makharadze (UKR) |
| 25 June 2023; 12:30 | Report | Dimitrova, Gesheva 4 | Goals | Kačková 5 | Burgas; Referees: Ivo Mareš (CZE), George Makharadze (UKR) |

=== Group B ===
| Pos | Team | Pld | W | D | L | GF | GA | GD | Pts | Qualification |
|---|---|---|---|---|---|---|---|---|---|---|
| 1 | Romania (H) | 3 | 3 | 0 | 0 | 37 | 19 | +18 | 9 | Final tournament |
| 2 | Turkey | 3 | 2 | 0 | 1 | 34 | 29 | +5 | 6 | Final tournament |
| 3 | Switzerland | 3 | 1 | 0 | 2 | 22 | 23 | −1 | 3 | |
| 4 | Sweden | 3 | 0 | 0 | 3 | 20 | 42 | −22 | 0 | |

Source: LEN
Rules for classification: 1) points; 2) head-to-head points; 3) head-to-head goal difference; 4) head-to-head number of goals scored; 5) Goal difference.
(H) Hosts

All times are local (UTC+3).

| 23 June 2023; 17:00 | Report | Turkey | 10–8 | Switzerland | Otopeni; Referees: Nikola Nanov (BUL), Erik Kolár (SVK) |
| 23 June 2023; 17:00 | Report | Score by quarters: 4–1, 3–3, 2–0, 1–4 | | | Otopeni; Referees: Nikola Nanov (BUL), Erik Kolár (SVK) |
| 23 June 2023; 17:00 | Report | Kaleağası 4 | Goals | De Feo 4 | Otopeni; Referees: Nikola Nanov (BUL), Erik Kolár (SVK) |

| 23 June 2023; 18:30 | Report | Romania | 14–9 | Sweden | Otopeni; Referees: Neville Mercieca (MLT), Damien Taylor (GBR) |
| 23 June 2023; 18:30 | Report | Score by quarters: 4–1, 3–4, 2–2, 5–2 | | | Otopeni; Referees: Neville Mercieca (MLT), Damien Taylor (GBR) |
| 23 June 2023; 18:30 | Report | Olteanu 5 | Goals | Hazell 4 | Otopeni; Referees: Neville Mercieca (MLT), Damien Taylor (GBR) |

| 24 June 2023; 17:00 | Report | Sweden | 5–19 | Turkey | Otopeni; Referees: Neville Mercieca (MLT), Erik Kolár (SVK) |
| 24 June 2023; 17:00 | Report | Score by quarters: 1–4, 0–7, 1–3, 3–5 | | | Otopeni; Referees: Neville Mercieca (MLT), Erik Kolár (SVK) |
| 24 June 2023; 17:00 | Report | Hassler 2 | Goals | Kuş 8 | Otopeni; Referees: Neville Mercieca (MLT), Erik Kolár (SVK) |

| 24 June 2023; 18:30 | Report | Switzerland | 5–7 | Romania | Otopeni; Referees: Damien Taylor (GBR), Nikola Nanov (BUL) |
| 24 June 2023; 18:30 | Report | Score by quarters: 2–3, 1–2, 2–2, 0–0 | | | Otopeni; Referees: Damien Taylor (GBR), Nikola Nanov (BUL) |
| 24 June 2023; 18:30 | Report | Verhagen 2 | Goals | Olteanu 3 | Otopeni; Referees: Damien Taylor (GBR), Nikola Nanov (BUL) |

| 25 June 2023; 10:00 | Report | Switzerland | 9–6 | Sweden | Otopeni; Referees: Nikola Nanov (BUL), Neville Mercieca (MLT) |
| 25 June 2023; 10:00 | Report | Score by quarters: 3–2, 1–1, 2–1, 3–2 | | | Otopeni; Referees: Nikola Nanov (BUL), Neville Mercieca (MLT) |
| 25 June 2023; 10:00 | Report | De Feo 3 | Goals | Hassler, Hazell 2 | Otopeni; Referees: Nikola Nanov (BUL), Neville Mercieca (MLT) |

| 25 June 2023; 11:30 | Report | Romania | 16–5 | Turkey | Otopeni; Referees: Damien Taylor (GBR), Erik Kolár (SVK) |
| 25 June 2023; 11:30 | Report | Score by quarters: 5–0, 2–1, 5–1, 4–3 | | | Otopeni; Referees: Damien Taylor (GBR), Erik Kolár (SVK) |
| 25 June 2023; 11:30 | Report | Olteanu 6 | Goals | Kuş 4 | Otopeni; Referees: Damien Taylor (GBR), Erik Kolár (SVK) |

=== Group C ===
| Pos | Team | Pld | W | D | L | GF | GA | GD | Pts | Qualification |
|---|---|---|---|---|---|---|---|---|---|---|
| 1 | Serbia (H) | 2 | 2 | 0 | 0 | 41 | 13 | +28 | 6 | Final tournament |
| 2 | Czech Republic | 2 | 1 | 0 | 1 | 25 | 29 | −4 | 3 | Final tournament |
| 3 | Ukraine | 2 | 0 | 0 | 2 | 8 | 32 | −24 | 0 | |

Source: LEN
Rules for classification: 1) points; 2) head-to-head points; 3) head-to-head goal difference; 4) head-to-head number of goals scored; 5) Goal difference.
(H) Hosts

All times are local (UTC+2).

| 23 June 2023; 18:00 | Report | Czech Republic | 13–7 | Ukraine | Novi Sad; Referees: Ralf Müller (GER), Eurico Silva (POR) |
| 23 June 2023; 18:00 | Report | Score by quarters: 4–2, 2–3, 3–2, 4–0 | | | Novi Sad; Referees: Ralf Müller (GER), Eurico Silva (POR) |
| 23 June 2023; 18:00 | Report | Holá 4 | Goals | Zelenko 2 | Novi Sad; Referees: Ralf Müller (GER), Eurico Silva (POR) |

| 24 June 2023; 18:00 | Report | Serbia | 22–12 | Czech Republic | Novi Sad; Referees: Eurico Silva (POR), Jarkko Virtanen (FIN) |
| 24 June 2023; 18:00 | Report | Score by quarters: 6–5, 5–3, 7–2, 4–2 | | | Novi Sad; Referees: Eurico Silva (POR), Jarkko Virtanen (FIN) |
| 24 June 2023; 18:00 | Report | Mandić 6 | Goals | Bušauerová 5 | Novi Sad; Referees: Eurico Silva (POR), Jarkko Virtanen (FIN) |

| 25 June 2023; 10:00 | Report | Serbia | 19–1 | Ukraine | Novi Sad; Referees: Jarkko Virtanen (FIN), Ralf Müller (GER) |
| 25 June 2023; 10:00 | Report | Score by quarters: 6–0, 3–0, 5–1, 5–0 | | | Novi Sad; Referees: Jarkko Virtanen (FIN), Ralf Müller (GER) |
| 25 June 2023; 10:00 | Report | Milićević 6 | Goals | Zelenko 1 | Novi Sad; Referees: Jarkko Virtanen (FIN), Ralf Müller (GER) |

=== Group D ===
| Pos | Team | Pld | W | D | L | GF | GA | GD | Pts | Qualification |
|---|---|---|---|---|---|---|---|---|---|---|
| 1 | Great Britain | 3 | 3 | 0 | 0 | 54 | 19 | +35 | 9 | Final tournament |
| 2 | Germany | 3 | 2 | 0 | 1 | 49 | 26 | +23 | 6 | Final tournament |
| 3 | Portugal (H) | 3 | 1 | 0 | 2 | 50 | 30 | +20 | 3 | |
| 4 | Finland | 3 | 0 | 0 | 3 | 9 | 87 | −78 | 0 | |

Source: LEN
Rules for classification: 1) points; 2) head-to-head points; 3) head-to-head goal difference; 4) head-to-head number of goals scored; 5) Goal difference.
(H) Hosts

All times are local (UTC+1).

| 23 June 2023; 18:00 | Report | Portugal | 28–4 | Finland | Rio Maior; Referees: Massimo Castrilli (SUI), Paul-Eugen-Dorin Georgescu (ROU) |
| 23 June 2023; 18:00 | Report | Score by quarters: 10–2, 4–0, 7–2, 7–0 | | | Rio Maior; Referees: Massimo Castrilli (SUI), Paul-Eugen-Dorin Georgescu (ROU) |
| 23 June 2023; 18:00 | Report | Lousa, Rodrigues 6 | Goals | Aikala, Koivisto 2 | Rio Maior; Referees: Massimo Castrilli (SUI), Paul-Eugen-Dorin Georgescu (ROU) |

| 23 June 2023; 19:30 | Report | Germany | 5–13 | Great Britain | Rio Maior; Referees: Alexandros Vlastos (SWE), Sevan Arslanyan (TUR) |
| 23 June 2023; 19:30 | Report | Score by quarters: 1–4, 0–4, 1–3, 3–2 | | | Rio Maior; Referees: Alexandros Vlastos (SWE), Sevan Arslanyan (TUR) |
| 23 June 2023; 19:30 | Report | Haas 2 | Goals | Turner 5 | Rio Maior; Referees: Alexandros Vlastos (SWE), Sevan Arslanyan (TUR) |

| 24 June 2023; 18:00 | Report | Germany | 32–3 | Finland | Rio Maior; Referees: Alexandros Vlastos (SWE), Sevan Arslanyan (TUR) |
| 24 June 2023; 18:00 | Report | Score by quarters: 7–0, 7–3, 8–0, 10–0 | | | Rio Maior; Referees: Alexandros Vlastos (SWE), Sevan Arslanyan (TUR) |
| 24 June 2023; 18:00 | Report | Vosseberg 8 | Goals | Tanke 2 | Rio Maior; Referees: Alexandros Vlastos (SWE), Sevan Arslanyan (TUR) |

| 24 June 2023; 19:30 | Report | Portugal | 12–14 | Great Britain | Rio Maior; Referees: Massimo Castrilli (SUI), Paul-Eugen-Dorin Georgescu (ROU) |
| 24 June 2023; 19:30 | Report | Score by quarters: 1–2, 3–3, 5–6, 3–3 | | | Rio Maior; Referees: Massimo Castrilli (SUI), Paul-Eugen-Dorin Georgescu (ROU) |
| 24 June 2023; 19:30 | Report | Fernandes 5 | Goals | Cutler 4 | Rio Maior; Referees: Massimo Castrilli (SUI), Paul-Eugen-Dorin Georgescu (ROU) |

| 25 June 2023; 09:00 | Report | Finland | 2–27 | Great Britain | Rio Maior; Referees: Alexandros Vlastos (SWE), Sevan Arslanyan (TUR) |
| 25 June 2023; 09:00 | Report | Score by quarters: 1–10, 1–6, 0–5, 0–6 | | | Rio Maior; Referees: Alexandros Vlastos (SWE), Sevan Arslanyan (TUR) |
| 25 June 2023; 09:00 | Report | Aikala, Busk 1 | Goals | Falvey, Nurthen 6 | Rio Maior; Referees: Alexandros Vlastos (SWE), Sevan Arslanyan (TUR) |

| 25 June 2023; 10:30 | Report | Portugal | 10–12 | Germany | Rio Maior; Referees: Paul-Eugen-Dorin Georgescu (ROU), Massimo Castrilli (SUI) |
| 25 June 2023; 10:30 | Report | Score by quarters: 1–3, 4–3, 1–3, 4–3 | | | Rio Maior; Referees: Paul-Eugen-Dorin Georgescu (ROU), Massimo Castrilli (SUI) |
| 25 June 2023; 10:30 | Report | three players 2 | Goals | Fry, Vosseberg 3 | Rio Maior; Referees: Paul-Eugen-Dorin Georgescu (ROU), Massimo Castrilli (SUI) |

== See also ==
- 2024 Men's European Water Polo Championship Qualifiers
