= 2022 Women's European Water Polo Championship Qualifiers =

The tournaments of the qualifications for the 2022 Women's European Water Polo Championship were held between 17 February and 6 March 2022. 14 teams, split into three groups, played in the qualifications for the final tournament. The top two teams from each group advanced to the European Championships.

== Group A ==
Pos	Team	Pld	W	D	L	GF	GA	GD	Pts	Qualification
1	Germany	4	4	0	0	63	16	+47	12	Final tournament
2	Romania (H)	4	3	0	1	45	32	+13	9	Final tournament
3	Slovakia	4	2	0	2	51	35	+16	6	
4	Ukraine	4	0	1	3	28	57	−29	1	
5	Ireland	4	0	1	3	23	70	−47	1	

Source: LEN
Rules for classification: 1) points; 2) head-to-head points; 3) head-to-head goal difference; 4) head-to-head number of goals scored; 5) goal difference.
(H) Hosts

All times are (UTC+2).

17 February 2022; 18:30	Report	Ukraine	5–17	Slovakia	Bucharest; Referees: Massimo Angileri (MLT), Anne Grandin (FRA)
17 February 2022; 18:30	Report	Score by quarters: 1–4, 3–3, 1–6, 0–4			Bucharest; Referees: Massimo Angileri (MLT), Anne Grandin (FRA)
17 February 2022; 18:30	Report	Khmil 2	Goals	Sedláková 6	Bucharest; Referees: Massimo Angileri (MLT), Anne Grandin (FRA)

17 February 2022; 20:00	Report	Romania	15–4	Ireland	Bucharest; Referees: Eurico Silva (POR), İlkin Özerengin (TUR)
17 February 2022; 20:00	Report	Score by quarters: 2–1, 5–0, 5–1, 3–2			Bucharest; Referees: Eurico Silva (POR), İlkin Özerengin (TUR)
17 February 2022; 20:00	Report	three players 3	Goals	Murphy 2	Bucharest; Referees: Eurico Silva (POR), İlkin Özerengin (TUR)

18 February 2022; 10:00	Report	Slovakia	4–12	Germany	Bucharest; Referees: Lazar Anđelić (SRB), Eurico Silva (POR)
18 February 2022; 10:00	Report	Score by quarters: 2–4, 1–5, 0–2, 1–1			Bucharest; Referees: Lazar Anđelić (SRB), Eurico Silva (POR)
18 February 2022; 10:00	Report	Kačková 2	Goals	Deike 4	Bucharest; Referees: Lazar Anđelić (SRB), Eurico Silva (POR)

18 February 2022; 12:00	Report	Ireland	8–8	Ukraine	Bucharest; Referees: Massimo Angileri (MLT), İlkin Özerengin (TUR)
18 February 2022; 12:00	Report	Score by quarters: 4–1, 1–1, 0–4, 3–2			Bucharest; Referees: Massimo Angileri (MLT), İlkin Özerengin (TUR)
18 February 2022; 12:00	Report	Kelly 3	Goals	Aboimova, Babak 2	Bucharest; Referees: Massimo Angileri (MLT), İlkin Özerengin (TUR)

18 February 2022; 18:30	Report	Germany	15–6	Ukraine	Bucharest; Referees: Anne Grandin (FRA), Eurico Silva (POR)
18 February 2022; 18:30	Report	Score by quarters: 3–2, 3–0, 6–3, 3–1			Bucharest; Referees: Anne Grandin (FRA), Eurico Silva (POR)
18 February 2022; 18:30	Report	Vosseberg 6	Goals	Khmil, Zelenko 2	Bucharest; Referees: Anne Grandin (FRA), Eurico Silva (POR)

18 February 2022; 20:00	Report	Slovakia	8–9	Romania	Bucharest; Referees: Lazar Anđelić (SRB), İlkin Özerengin (TUR)
18 February 2022; 20:00	Report	Score by quarters: 2–1, 0–2, 2–4, 4–2			Bucharest; Referees: Lazar Anđelić (SRB), İlkin Özerengin (TUR)
18 February 2022; 20:00	Report	three players 2	Goals	Mihaila 3	Bucharest; Referees: Lazar Anđelić (SRB), İlkin Özerengin (TUR)

19 February 2022; 18:30	Report	Ireland	2–25	Germany	Bucharest; Referees: Massimo Angileri (MLT), Anne Grandin (FRA)
19 February 2022; 18:30	Report	Score by quarters: 0–6, 0–4, 1–7, 1–8			Bucharest; Referees: Massimo Angileri (MLT), Anne Grandin (FRA)
19 February 2022; 18:30	Report	Loane, McGuirk 1	Goals	three players 4	Bucharest; Referees: Massimo Angileri (MLT), Anne Grandin (FRA)

19 February 2022; 20:00	Report	Romania	17–9	Ukraine	Bucharest; Referees: Eurico Silva (POR), Lazar Anđelić (SRB)
19 February 2022; 20:00	Report	Score by quarters: 5–2, 2–3, 7–3, 3–1			Bucharest; Referees: Eurico Silva (POR), Lazar Anđelić (SRB)
19 February 2022; 20:00	Report	Szeghalmi 5	Goals	Zelenko 3	Bucharest; Referees: Eurico Silva (POR), Lazar Anđelić (SRB)

20 February 2022; 09:30	Report	Slovakia	22–9	Ireland	Bucharest; Referees: Lazar Anđelić (SRB), Massimo Angileri (MLT)
20 February 2022; 09:30	Report	Score by quarters: 6–1, 8–5, 5–0, 3–3			Bucharest; Referees: Lazar Anđelić (SRB), Massimo Angileri (MLT)
20 February 2022; 09:30	Report	Kováčiková 4	Goals	three players 2	Bucharest; Referees: Lazar Anđelić (SRB), Massimo Angileri (MLT)

20 February 2022; 11:00	Report	Germany	11–4	Romania	Bucharest; Referees: Anne Grandin (FRA), İlkin Özerengin (TUR)
20 February 2022; 11:00	Report	Score by quarters: 5–1, 1–1, 1–1, 4–1			Bucharest; Referees: Anne Grandin (FRA), İlkin Özerengin (TUR)
20 February 2022; 11:00	Report	Hartwig, Vosseberg 3	Goals	four players 1	Bucharest; Referees: Anne Grandin (FRA), İlkin Özerengin (TUR)

== Group B ==
Pos	Team	Pld	W	D	L	GF	GA	GD	Pts	Qualification
1	Greece	4	4	0	0	104	24	+80	12	Final tournament
2	Serbia (H)	4	3	0	1	66	46	+20	9	Final tournament
3	Switzerland	4	2	0	2	40	51	−11	6	
4	Turkey	4	1	0	3	39	64	−25	3	
5	Belgium	4	0	0	4	25	89	−64	0	

Source: LEN
Rules for classification: 1) points; 2) head-to-head points; 3) head-to-head goal difference; 4) head-to-head number of goals scored; 5) goal difference.
(H) Hosts

All times are (UTC+1).

17 February 2022; 19:00	Report	Serbia	8–24	Greece	Zrenjanin; Referees: Philip Uhlig (GER), Mihai Balanescu (ROU)
17 February 2022; 19:00	Report	Score by quarters: 5–5, 2–5, 0–7, 1–7			Zrenjanin; Referees: Philip Uhlig (GER), Mihai Balanescu (ROU)
17 February 2022; 19:00	Report	Ilić 4	Goals	Myriokefalitaki, Ninou 5	Zrenjanin; Referees: Philip Uhlig (GER), Mihai Balanescu (ROU)

17 February 2022; 21:00	Report	Turkey	23–9	Belgium	Zrenjanin; Referees: Anna Goncharenko (UKR), Risto Damchevski (MKD)
17 February 2022; 21:00	Report	Score by quarters: 8–2, 5–2, 6–2, 4–3			Zrenjanin; Referees: Anna Goncharenko (UKR), Risto Damchevski (MKD)
17 February 2022; 21:00	Report	Kuş 10	Goals	three players 2	Zrenjanin; Referees: Anna Goncharenko (UKR), Risto Damchevski (MKD)

18 February 2022; 10:00	Report	Turkey	7–25	Greece	Zrenjanin; Referees: Mihai Balanescu (ROU), Risto Damchevski (MKD)
18 February 2022; 10:00	Report	Score by quarters: 2–6, 4–4, 1–7, 0–8			Zrenjanin; Referees: Mihai Balanescu (ROU), Risto Damchevski (MKD)
18 February 2022; 10:00	Report	three players 2	Goals	Myriokefalitaki 5	Zrenjanin; Referees: Mihai Balanescu (ROU), Risto Damchevski (MKD)

18 February 2022; 12:00	Report	Switzerland	14–7	Belgium	Zrenjanin; Referees: Róbert Horváth (SVK), Philip Uhlig (GER)
18 February 2022; 12:00	Report	Score by quarters: 5–0, 1–2, 5–3, 3–2			Zrenjanin; Referees: Róbert Horváth (SVK), Philip Uhlig (GER)
18 February 2022; 12:00	Report	Kohli 5	Goals	Lampaert 3	Zrenjanin; Referees: Róbert Horváth (SVK), Philip Uhlig (GER)

18 February 2022; 19:00	Report	Serbia	17–11	Switzerland	Zrenjanin; Referees: Anna Goncharenko (UKR), Philip Uhlig (GER)
18 February 2022; 19:00	Report	Score by quarters: 5–4, 2–5, 4–0, 6–2			Zrenjanin; Referees: Anna Goncharenko (UKR), Philip Uhlig (GER)
18 February 2022; 19:00	Report	Vuković 5	Goals	Kohli 5	Zrenjanin; Referees: Anna Goncharenko (UKR), Philip Uhlig (GER)

18 February 2022; 21:00	Report	Greece	33–2	Belgium	Zrenjanin; Referees: Risto Damchevski (MKD), Róbert Horváth (SVK)
18 February 2022; 21:00	Report	Score by quarters: 10–0, 8–2, 7–0, 8–0			Zrenjanin; Referees: Risto Damchevski (MKD), Róbert Horváth (SVK)
18 February 2022; 21:00	Report	Chaldaiou 7	Goals	Lampaert, Laton 1	Zrenjanin; Referees: Risto Damchevski (MKD), Róbert Horváth (SVK)

19 February 2022; 19:00	Report	Serbia	19–7	Belgium	Zrenjanin; Referees: Róbert Horváth (SVK), Risto Damchevski (MKD)
19 February 2022; 19:00	Report	Score by quarters: 3–0, 4–0, 5–2, 7–5			Zrenjanin; Referees: Róbert Horváth (SVK), Risto Damchevski (MKD)
19 February 2022; 19:00	Report	Milićević, Vuković 3	Goals	Baudonck, Lampaert 2	Zrenjanin; Referees: Róbert Horváth (SVK), Risto Damchevski (MKD)

19 February 2022; 21:00	Report	Switzerland	8–5	Turkey	Zrenjanin; Referees: Mihai Balanescu (ROU), Anna Goncharenko (UKR)
19 February 2022; 21:00	Report	Score by quarters: 2–1, 2–1, 2–2, 2–1			Zrenjanin; Referees: Mihai Balanescu (ROU), Anna Goncharenko (UKR)
19 February 2022; 21:00	Report	Velikova, Verhagen 2	Goals	Buralı 2	Zrenjanin; Referees: Mihai Balanescu (ROU), Anna Goncharenko (UKR)

20 February 2022; 10:00	Report	Switzerland	7–22	Greece	Zrenjanin; Referees: Mihai Balanescu (ROU), Philip Uhlig (GER)
20 February 2022; 10:00	Report	Score by quarters: 3–4, 3–3, 1–5, 0–10			Zrenjanin; Referees: Mihai Balanescu (ROU), Philip Uhlig (GER)
20 February 2022; 10:00	Report	Kohli 5	Goals	Grigoropoulou 4	Zrenjanin; Referees: Mihai Balanescu (ROU), Philip Uhlig (GER)

20 February 2022; 12:00	Report	Serbia	22–4	Turkey	Zrenjanin; Referees: Anna Goncharenko (UKR), Róbert Horváth (SVK)
20 February 2022; 12:00	Report	Score by quarters: 3–1, 5–2, 7–1, 7–0			Zrenjanin; Referees: Anna Goncharenko (UKR), Róbert Horváth (SVK)
20 February 2022; 12:00	Report	Milićević, Vuković 4	Goals	Kuş 2	Zrenjanin; Referees: Anna Goncharenko (UKR), Róbert Horváth (SVK)

== Group C ==
Pos	Team	Pld	W	D	L	GF	GA	GD	Pts	Qualification
1	Israel	3	3	0	0	47	21	+26	9	Final tournament
2	France	3	2	0	1	45	24	+21	6	Final tournament
3	Portugal	3	1	0	2	18	31	−13	3	
4	Malta (H)	3	0	0	3	14	48	−34	0	

Source: LEN
Rules for classification: 1) points; 2) head-to-head points; 3) head-to-head goal difference; 4) head-to-head number of goals scored; 5) goal difference.
(H) Hosts

All times are (UTC+1).

4 March 2022; 17:00	Report	Portugal	5–15	Israel	Gżira; Referees: Maria Daskalopoulou (GRE), Ursula Wengenroth (SUI)
4 March 2022; 17:00	Report	Score by quarters: 1–6, 2–1, 1–3, 1–5			Gżira; Referees: Maria Daskalopoulou (GRE), Ursula Wengenroth (SUI)
4 March 2022; 17:00	Report	Reis 3	Goals	Menakerman 4	Gżira; Referees: Maria Daskalopoulou (GRE), Ursula Wengenroth (SUI)

4 March 2022; 18:30	Report	Malta	4–23	France	Gżira
4 March 2022; 18:30	Report	Score by quarters: 0–7, 2–4, 1–7, 1–5			Gżira
4 March 2022; 18:30	Report	Perici 3	Goals	Vernoux 7	Gżira

5 March 2022; 17:00	Report	Israel	13–10	France	Gżira; Referees: Stephen O'Brien (IRL), Maria Daskalopoulou (GRE)
5 March 2022; 17:00	Report	Score by quarters: 5–4, 4–2, 2–3, 2–1			Gżira; Referees: Stephen O'Brien (IRL), Maria Daskalopoulou (GRE)
5 March 2022; 17:00	Report	Bogachenko, Strugo 3	Goals	Guillet 3	Gżira; Referees: Stephen O'Brien (IRL), Maria Daskalopoulou (GRE)

5 March 2022; 18:30	Report	Malta	4–6	Portugal	Gżira; Referees: Ursula Wengenroth (SUI), Alain D'Hossche (BEL)
5 March 2022; 18:30	Report	Score by quarters: 1–2, 1–0, 1–2, 1–2			Gżira; Referees: Ursula Wengenroth (SUI), Alain D'Hossche (BEL)
5 March 2022; 18:30	Report	Agius 2	Goals	Fernandes 4	Gżira; Referees: Ursula Wengenroth (SUI), Alain D'Hossche (BEL)

6 March 2022; 09:00	Report	France	12–7	Portugal	Gżira; Referees: Stephen O'Brien (IRL), Ursula Wengenroth (SUI)
6 March 2022; 09:00	Report	Score by quarters: 2–0, 3–2, 2–4, 5–1			Gżira; Referees: Stephen O'Brien (IRL), Ursula Wengenroth (SUI)
6 March 2022; 09:00	Report	Vernoux 7	Goals	Nunes, Pereira 2	Gżira; Referees: Stephen O'Brien (IRL), Ursula Wengenroth (SUI)

6 March 2022; 10:30	Report	Malta	6–19	Israel	Gżira; Referees: D’Hossche Alain (BEL), Daskalopoulou Maria (GRE)
6 March 2022; 10:30	Report	Score by quarters: 0–3, 3–5, 2–6, 1–5			Gżira; Referees: D’Hossche Alain (BEL), Daskalopoulou Maria (GRE)
6 March 2022; 10:30	Report	Micallef 3	Goals	Lindhout 5	Gżira; Referees: D’Hossche Alain (BEL), Daskalopoulou Maria (GRE)

== See also ==
- 2022 Men's European Water Polo Championship Qualifiers
