= 2012 Women's European Water Polo Championship Qualifiers =

This article shows the qualification for the 2012 Women's European Water Polo Championship.

== Qualification ==
=== System ===
Date	Competition Name	Result
Sep 2010	2010 Women's European Water Polo Championship	Three pre-qualified
Jan - Oct 2011	Group Stage (2)	Top 2 qualified

=== Pre-qualified ===
Netherlands (hosts)
Russia (winners, 2010 Women's European Water Polo Championship)
Greece (finalists, 2010 Women's European Water Polo Championship)
Italy (4th place, 2010 Women's European Water Polo Championship)

=== Group stage ===
==== Draw pools ====
Draw pool 1	
Hungary	5th place, 2010 Women's European Water Polo Championship
Spain	6th place, 2010 Women's European Water Polo Championship
Draw pool 2	
Germany	7th place, 2010 Women's European Water Polo Championship
Great Britain	3rd place, 2010 Women's European Water Polo Championship Qualification Group B
Draw pool 3	
France	3rd place, 2010 Women's European Water Polo Championship Qualification Group A
Ukraine	4th place, 2010 Women's European Water Polo Championship Qualification Group A
Draw pool 4	
Slovakia	
Israel	

==== Group A ====
Team	Pld	W	D	L	GF	GA	GD	Pts
Hungary	6	6	0	0	115	52	+63	18
Germany	6	4	0	2	116	65	+51	12
France	6	2	0	4	67	72	−5	6
Slovakia	6	0	0	6	39	148	−109	0

29 Jan 2011; 14:00	Scoresheet	Slovakia	5–33	Hungary	Nereus Pool, Žilina; Referees: Schwarts Matan (ISR), Mauss Marcela (GER)
29 Jan 2011; 14:00	Scoresheet	Score by quarters: 1–3, 2–10, 1–10, 1–10			Nereus Pool, Žilina; Referees: Schwarts Matan (ISR), Mauss Marcela (GER)

29 Jan 2011; 20:00	Scoresheet	France	8–16	Germany	Max Dormoy Pool, Lille; Referees: Byelyevtsov Vyacheslav (UKR), Freebury Chris (GBR)
29 Jan 2011; 20:00	Scoresheet	Score by quarters: 2–3, 1–5, 2–3, 3–5			Max Dormoy Pool, Lille; Referees: Byelyevtsov Vyacheslav (UKR), Freebury Chris (GBR)

26 March 2011; 15:45	Scoresheet	Hungary	14–7	France

26 March 2011; 16:00	Scoresheet	Germany	26–7	Slovakia

30 April 2011; 18:00	Scoresheet	Germany	13–16	Hungary

30 April 2011; 20:00	Scoresheet	France	20–7	Slovakia

2 July 2011; 16:00	Scoresheet	Hungary	16–12	Germany

2 July 2011; 19:00	Scoresheet	Slovakia	5–14	France

24 September 2011	Report	Slovakia	8–32	Germany

24 September 2011	Report	France	8–13	Hungary

15 October 2011	Report	Germany	17–10	France

15 October 2011	Report	Hungary	23–7	Slovakia

==== Group B ====
Team	Pld	W	D	L	GF	GA	GD	Pts
Spain	6	6	0	0	115	32	+83	18
Great Britain	6	4	0	2	94	43	+51	12
Ukraine	6	2	0	4	57	93	−36	6
Israel	6	0	0	6	24	122	−98	0

29 Jan 2011; 20:00	Scoresheet	Great Britain	26–1	Israel	Loughborough University, Loughborough; Referees: Grandin Anne (FRA), Cisneros Horrillo Jordi (ESP)
29 Jan 2011; 20:00	Scoresheet	Score by quarters: 6–0, 7–0, 5–0, 8–1			Loughborough University, Loughborough; Referees: Grandin Anne (FRA), Cisneros Horrillo Jordi (ESP)

30 Jan 2011; 17:00	Scoresheet	Spain	24–8	Ukraine	El Sorrall, Mataró; Referees: Zurek Lubomir (SVK), Szekely Balazs (HUN)
30 Jan 2011; 17:00	Scoresheet	Score by quarters: 7–2, 6–3, 5–1, 6–2			El Sorrall, Mataró; Referees: Zurek Lubomir (SVK), Szekely Balazs (HUN)

26 March 2011; 18:00	Scoresheet	Spain	22–0	Israel

26 March 2011; 20:00	Scoresheet	Ukraine	7–11	Great Britain

30 April 2011; 17:30	Scoresheet	Great Britain	9–14	Spain

30 April 2011; 20:00	Scoresheet	Israel	7–15	Ukraine

2 July 2011; 11:30	Scoresheet	Spain	10–6	Great Britain

2 July 2011; 12:30	Scoresheet	Ukraine	13–10	Israel

24 September 2011	Report	Spain	25–3	Israel

24 September 2011	Report	Great Britain	21–8	Ukraine

15 October 2011	Report	Israel	3–21	Great Britain

15 October 2011	Report	Ukraine	6–20	Spain

== See also ==
- 2012 Men's European Water Polo Championship Qualifiers
