= 2014 Women's European Water Polo Championship Qualifiers =

The qualification for the 2014 Women's European Water Polo Championship were played between 16 and 19 January 2014. The teams are in two groups.

== Group A ==
Team	Pld	W	D	L	GF	GA	GD	Pts
Netherlands	4	4	0	0	98	15	+83	12
Great Britain	4	3	0	1	57	27	+30	9
Portugal	4	2	0	2	37	57	−20	6
Ukraine	4	1	0	3	23	64	−41	3
Israel	4	0	0	4	20	72	−52	0

== Group B ==
Team	Pld	W	D	L	GF	GA	GD	Pts
Spain	3	3	0	0	69	22	+47	9
France	3	2	0	1	31	32	-1	6
Germany	3	1	0	2	28	42	-14	3
Serbia	3	0	0	3	28	60	-32	0
