= 2023 World Aquatics Women's Water Polo World Cup =

- League: FINA Women's Water Polo World Cup
- Sport: Water polo
- Duration: 11 April – 25 June

Super Final
- Finals champions: United States (5th title)
- Runners-up: Netherlands

FINA Women's Water Polo World Cup seasons
- ← 2018 2025 →

The 2023 World Aquatics Women's Water Polo World Cup was the 18th edition of the tournament. It ran from 11 April to 25 June 2023. The Super final took place between 23 and 25 June 2023 in Long Beach, United States.

From this year on, the tournament was replacing the FINA Water Polo World League.

The United States won their fourth straight and fifth overall title, after defeating the Netherlands in the final.

== Format ==
There were two divisions. In Division 1, the top eight teams from the World Championships played. They played a round-robin in April, at pre-selected venues. All other teams could sign up in Division 2, in which each continent hosted a qualification tournament. The top two teams from the tournaments played in an intercontinental tournament. The top-six teams of Division 1 and the top-two teams from Division 2 competed in the super final, held between 23 and 25 June 2023. At the end of the tournament, the last-ranked team was relegated to Division 2 and the winner of Division 2 moved to Division 1 for the following year. A win gave a team three points, a win after penalties two, a loss after penalties one and a loss after regular time zero points.

== Division 1 ==
The draw was held on 1 December 2022. The first tournament was played from 11 to 13 April in Rotterdam, Netherlands and the second tournament between 19 and 21 April 2023 in Athens, Greece. The top four teams from the first tournament qualified for the super final but participated in the second tournament as well, where the last two spots were played out.

=== Round 1 ===
The top-two teams from both groups qualified for the super final. All teams participated in the second tournament.

All times are local (UTC+2).

==== Group A ====
Pos	Team	Pld	W	PW	PL	L	GF	GA	GD	Pts	Qualification
1	Netherlands (H)	3	3	0	0	0	37	28	+9	9	Super final
2	Hungary	3	2	0	0	1	42	35	+7	6	Super final
3	Greece	3	1	0	0	2	32	35	−3	3	
4	Australia	3	0	0	0	3	25	38	−13	0	

Source: World Aquatics
Rules for classification: 1) points; 2) goal difference; 3) head-to-head result.
(H) Host

11 April 2023; 18:30	Report	Australia	7–11	Netherlands	Rotterdam; Referees: Pau Segurana (ESP), Jennifer McCall (USA)
11 April 2023; 18:30	Report	Score by quarters: 2–1, 2–4, 2–2, 1–4			Rotterdam; Referees: Pau Segurana (ESP), Jennifer McCall (USA)
11 April 2023; 18:30	Report	C. Andrews, Williams 2	Goals	Sleeking 3	Rotterdam; Referees: Pau Segurana (ESP), Jennifer McCall (USA)

11 April 2023; 20:30	Report	Greece	12–14	Hungary	Rotterdam; Referees: Alessia Ferrari (ITA), Matan Schwartz (ISR)
11 April 2023; 20:30	Report	Score by quarters: 4–2, 4–3, 2–6, 2–3			Rotterdam; Referees: Alessia Ferrari (ITA), Matan Schwartz (ISR)
11 April 2023; 20:30	Report	Eleftheriadou 4	Goals	Keszthelyi 6	Rotterdam; Referees: Alessia Ferrari (ITA), Matan Schwartz (ISR)

12 April 2023; 18:30	Report	Netherlands	14–10	Greece	Rotterdam; Referees: Hendrik Schopp (GER), Zhang Liang (CHN)
12 April 2023; 18:30	Report	Score by quarters: 3–0, 4–1, 5–4, 2–5			Rotterdam; Referees: Hendrik Schopp (GER), Zhang Liang (CHN)
12 April 2023; 18:30	Report	Van de Kraats 4	Goals	three players 2	Rotterdam; Referees: Hendrik Schopp (GER), Zhang Liang (CHN)

12 April 2023; 20:30	Report	Hungary	17–11	Australia	Rotterdam; Referees: Alessia Ferrari (ITA), Pau Segurana (ESP)
12 April 2023; 20:30	Report	Score by quarters: 6–2, 2–4, 5–1, 4–4			Rotterdam; Referees: Alessia Ferrari (ITA), Pau Segurana (ESP)
12 April 2023; 20:30	Report	Szilágyi 4	Goals	four players 2	Rotterdam; Referees: Alessia Ferrari (ITA), Pau Segurana (ESP)

13 April 2023; 14:00	Report	Greece	10–7	Australia	Rotterdam; Referees: Alessia Ferrari (ITA), Zhang Liang (CHN)
13 April 2023; 14:00	Report	Score by quarters: 3–4, 1–0, 4–2, 2–1			Rotterdam; Referees: Alessia Ferrari (ITA), Zhang Liang (CHN)
13 April 2023; 14:00	Report	Eleftheriadou 3	Goals	A. Andrews 2	Rotterdam; Referees: Alessia Ferrari (ITA), Zhang Liang (CHN)

13 April 2023; 18:30	Report	Netherlands	12–11	Hungary	Rotterdam; Referees: Jennifer McCall (USA), Pau Segurana (ESP)
13 April 2023; 18:30	Report	Score by quarters: 2–2, 4–2, 3–4, 3–3			Rotterdam; Referees: Jennifer McCall (USA), Pau Segurana (ESP)
13 April 2023; 18:30	Report	L. Rogge 5	Goals	Parkes 3	Rotterdam; Referees: Jennifer McCall (USA), Pau Segurana (ESP)

==== Group B ====
Pos	Team	Pld	W	PW	PL	L	GF	GA	GD	Pts	Qualification
1	United States	3	2	0	1	0	38	30	+8	7	Super final
2	Italy	3	2	0	0	1	40	36	+4	6	Super final
3	Spain	3	1	1	0	1	36	32	+4	5	
4	China	3	0	0	0	3	25	41	−16	0	

Source: World Aquatics
Rules for classification: 1) points; 2) goal difference; 3) head-to-head result.

11 April 2023; 14:00	Report	Spain	17–15 (PSO)	United States	Rotterdam; Referees: Nóra Debreceni (HUN), Hendrik Schopp (GER)
11 April 2023; 14:00	Report	Score by quarters: 2–2, 3–4, 4–5, 3–1 PSO: 5–3			Rotterdam; Referees: Nóra Debreceni (HUN), Hendrik Schopp (GER)
11 April 2023; 14:00	Report	Forca, Ortiz 4	Goals	Raney 3	Rotterdam; Referees: Nóra Debreceni (HUN), Hendrik Schopp (GER)

11 April 2023; 16:00	Report	Italy	14–13	China	Rotterdam; Referees: Peter de Jong (NED), Alexandros Chatzigoulas (GRE)
11 April 2023; 16:00	Report	Score by quarters: 2–4, 3–2, 5–3, 4–4			Rotterdam; Referees: Peter de Jong (NED), Alexandros Chatzigoulas (GRE)
11 April 2023; 16:00	Report	Avegno 6	Goals	Zhang J. 4	Rotterdam; Referees: Peter de Jong (NED), Alexandros Chatzigoulas (GRE)

12 April 2023; 14:00	Report	Spain	9–13	Italy	Rotterdam; Referees: Alexandros Chatzigoulas (GRE), Matan Schwartz (ISR)
12 April 2023; 14:00	Report	Score by quarters: 3–2, 2–4, 3–3, 1–4			Rotterdam; Referees: Alexandros Chatzigoulas (GRE), Matan Schwartz (ISR)
12 April 2023; 14:00	Report	Ruiz 3	Goals	Marletta 4	Rotterdam; Referees: Alexandros Chatzigoulas (GRE), Matan Schwartz (ISR)

12 April 2023; 16:00	Report	United States	12–5	China	Rotterdam; Referees: Fiona Haigh (AUS), Peter de Jong (NED)
12 April 2023; 16:00	Report	Score by quarters: 3–1, 2–2, 4–1, 3–1			Rotterdam; Referees: Fiona Haigh (AUS), Peter de Jong (NED)
12 April 2023; 16:00	Report	Bonaguidi, Musselman 3	Goals	Yan S. 3	Rotterdam; Referees: Fiona Haigh (AUS), Peter de Jong (NED)

13 April 2023; 16:00	Report	Spain	15–7	China	Rotterdam; Referees: Nóra Debreceni (NED), Alexandros Chatzigoulas (GRE)
13 April 2023; 16:00	Report	Score by quarters: 2–1, 3–4, 6–1, 4–1			Rotterdam; Referees: Nóra Debreceni (NED), Alexandros Chatzigoulas (GRE)
13 April 2023; 16:00	Report	Ortiz 4	Goals	Yan S. 4	Rotterdam; Referees: Nóra Debreceni (NED), Alexandros Chatzigoulas (GRE)

13 April 2023; 20:30	Report	United States	14–13	Italy	Rotterdam; Referees: Matan Schwartz (ISR), Hendrik Schopp (GER)
13 April 2023; 20:30	Report	Score by quarters: 5–1, 3–6, 4–3, 2–3			Rotterdam; Referees: Matan Schwartz (ISR), Hendrik Schopp (GER)
13 April 2023; 20:30	Report	Musselman, Steffens 5	Goals	Picozzi 4	Rotterdam; Referees: Matan Schwartz (ISR), Hendrik Schopp (GER)

=== Round 2 ===
All teams from Group 1 were already qualified and played for seeding for the super final. The top-two placed teams from Group 2 qualified for the super final. All results from the first round were taken over.

All times are local (UTC+3).

==== Group 1 ====
Pos	Team	Pld	W	PW	PL	L	GF	GA	GD	Pts
1	Netherlands	6	5	0	0	1	73	58	+15	15
2	United States	6	4	0	1	1	66	53	+13	13
3	Hungary	6	4	0	0	2	75	59	+16	12
4	Italy	6	2	0	0	4	59	75	−16	6

Source: World Aquatics
Rules for classification: 1) points; 2) goal difference; 3) head-to-head result.

19 April 2023; 16:00	Report	Netherlands	16–10	Italy	Athens; Referees: Marta Cabañas (ESP), Fiona Haigh (AUS)
19 April 2023; 16:00	Report	Score by quarters: 4–2, 5–2, 4–3, 3–3			Athens; Referees: Marta Cabañas (ESP), Fiona Haigh (AUS)
19 April 2023; 16:00	Report	Van de Kraats, L. Rogge 4	Goals	Bettini 3	Athens; Referees: Marta Cabañas (ESP), Fiona Haigh (AUS)

19 April 2023; 20:00	Report	United States	10–8	Hungary	Athens; Referees: Boris Margeta (SLO), Natalia Markopoulou (GRE)
19 April 2023; 20:00	Report	Score by quarters: 3–2, 2–1, 2–3, 3–2			Athens; Referees: Boris Margeta (SLO), Natalia Markopoulou (GRE)
19 April 2023; 20:00	Report	four players 2	Goals	Gurisatti 3	Athens; Referees: Boris Margeta (SLO), Natalia Markopoulou (GRE)

20 April 2023; 16:00	Report	Netherlands	11–12	Hungary	Athens; Referees: Aurélie Blanchard (FRA), Natalia Markopoulou (GRE)
20 April 2023; 16:00	Report	Score by quarters: 4–5, 3–3, 2–2, 2–2			Athens; Referees: Aurélie Blanchard (FRA), Natalia Markopoulou (GRE)
20 April 2023; 16:00	Report	Sleeking 4	Goals	Szilágyi 4	Athens; Referees: Aurélie Blanchard (FRA), Natalia Markopoulou (GRE)

20 April 2023; 20:00	Report	United States	10–6	Italy	Athens; Referees: Zhang Liang (CHN), Fiona Haigh (AUS)
20 April 2023; 20:00	Report	Score by quarters: 2–1, 1–2, 6–2, 1–1			Athens; Referees: Zhang Liang (CHN), Fiona Haigh (AUS)
20 April 2023; 20:00	Report	Raney 5	Goals	Marletta 3	Athens; Referees: Zhang Liang (CHN), Fiona Haigh (AUS)

21 April 2023; 16:00	Report	United States	8–9	Netherlands	Athens; Referees: Fiona Haigh (AUS), Natalia Markopoulou (GRE)
21 April 2023; 16:00	Report	Score by quarters: 2–3, 2–4, 3–2, 1–0			Athens; Referees: Fiona Haigh (AUS), Natalia Markopoulou (GRE)
21 April 2023; 16:00	Report	Bonaguidi, Musselman 3	Goals	B. Rogge 3	Athens; Referees: Fiona Haigh (AUS), Natalia Markopoulou (GRE)

21 April 2023; 20:00	Report	Italy	3–13	Hungary	Athens; Referees: Marta Cabañas (ESP), Aurélie Blanchard (FRA)
21 April 2023; 20:00	Report	Score by quarters: 1–4, 1–6, 0–1, 1–2			Athens; Referees: Marta Cabañas (ESP), Aurélie Blanchard (FRA)
21 April 2023; 20:00	Report	three players 1	Goals	Hajdú 3	Athens; Referees: Marta Cabañas (ESP), Aurélie Blanchard (FRA)

==== Group 2 ====
Pos	Team	Pld	W	PW	PL	L	GF	GA	GD	Pts	Qualification or relegation
1	Spain	6	3	2	0	1	75	64	+11	13	Super final
2	Greece (H)	6	2	0	2	2	73	74	−1	8	Super final
3	Australia	6	1	1	0	4	60	69	−9	5	
4	China	6	0	0	0	6	54	83	−29	0	Division 2

Source: World Aquatics
Rules for classification: 1) points; 2) goal difference; 3) head-to-head result.
(H) Host

19 April 2023; 14:00	Report	Spain	9–8	Australia	Athens; Referees: Giuliana Nicolosi (ITA), Diana Dutilh (NED)
19 April 2023; 14:00	Report	Score by quarters: 3–1, 2–4, 3–2, 1–1			Athens; Referees: Giuliana Nicolosi (ITA), Diana Dutilh (NED)
19 April 2023; 14:00	Report	Ortiz 5	Goals	three players 2	Athens; Referees: Giuliana Nicolosi (ITA), Diana Dutilh (NED)

19 April 2023; 18:00	Report	Greece	13–11	China	Athens; Referees: Aurélie Blanchard (FRA), Gabriella Várkonyi (HUN)
19 April 2023; 18:00	Report	Score by quarters: 2–4, 2–3, 5–2, 4–2			Athens; Referees: Aurélie Blanchard (FRA), Gabriella Várkonyi (HUN)
19 April 2023; 18:00	Report	Eleftheriadou 5	Goals	three players 2	Athens; Referees: Aurélie Blanchard (FRA), Gabriella Várkonyi (HUN)

20 April 2023; 14:00	Report	Spain	17–11	China	Athens; Referees: Jennifer McCall (USA), Giuliana Nicolosi (ITA)
20 April 2023; 14:00	Report	Score by quarters: 4–1, 4–4, 4–2, 5–4			Athens; Referees: Jennifer McCall (USA), Giuliana Nicolosi (ITA)
20 April 2023; 14:00	Report	Ruiz 5	Goals	Wang H. 3	Athens; Referees: Jennifer McCall (USA), Giuliana Nicolosi (ITA)

20 April 2023; 18:00	Report	Greece	18–19 (PSO)	Australia	Athens; Referees: Boris Margeta (SLO), Gabriella Várkonyi (HUN)
20 April 2023; 18:00	Report	Score by quarters: 4–4, 7–5, 1–4, 3–2 PSO: 3–4			Athens; Referees: Boris Margeta (SLO), Gabriella Várkonyi (HUN)
20 April 2023; 18:00	Report	Ninou 6	Goals	Halligan 4	Athens; Referees: Boris Margeta (SLO), Gabriella Várkonyi (HUN)

21 April 2023; 14:00	Report	China	7–12	Australia	Athens; Referees: Diana Dutilh (NED), Jennifer McCall (USA)
21 April 2023; 14:00	Report	Score by quarters: 2–2, 3–4, 2–2, 0–4			Athens; Referees: Diana Dutilh (NED), Jennifer McCall (USA)
21 April 2023; 14:00	Report	Zhang J. 4	Goals	A. Andrews, Ridge 3	Athens; Referees: Diana Dutilh (NED), Jennifer McCall (USA)

21 April 2023; 18:00	Report	Spain	18–17 (PSO)	Greece	Athens; Referees: Zhang Liang (CHN), Boris Margeta (SLO)
21 April 2023; 18:00	Report	Score by quarters: 3–4, 5–4, 1–1, 4–4 PSO: 5–4			Athens; Referees: Zhang Liang (CHN), Boris Margeta (SLO)
21 April 2023; 18:00	Report	Ortiz 4	Goals	Ninou 4	Athens; Referees: Zhang Liang (CHN), Boris Margeta (SLO)

== Division 2 ==
The draw was held on 13 April 2023. The tournament took place in Berlin, Germany between 2 and 4 May 2023.

All times are local (UTC+2).

=== Group A ===
Pos	Team	Pld	W	PW	PL	L	GF	GA	GD	Pts	Qualification
1	Israel	3	3	0	0	0	70	16	+54	9	Crossover
2	South Africa	3	2	0	0	1	38	35	+3	6	Crossover
3	Uzbekistan	3	1	0	0	2	26	44	−18	3	
4	Ukraine	3	0	0	0	3	17	56	−39	0	

Source: World Aquatics
Rules for classification: 1) points; 2) goal difference; 3) head-to-head result.

2 May 2023; 08:30	Report	South Africa	7–22	Israel	Berlin; Referees: Hendrik Schopp (GER), Adil Aimbetov (KAZ)
2 May 2023; 08:30	Report	Score by quarters: 1–4, 4–4, 2–6, 0–8			Berlin; Referees: Hendrik Schopp (GER), Adil Aimbetov (KAZ)
2 May 2023; 08:30	Report	Versfeld 4	Goals	Levi, Rahum 4	Berlin; Referees: Hendrik Schopp (GER), Adil Aimbetov (KAZ)

2 May 2023; 10:00	Report	Uzbekistan	11–10	Ukraine	Berlin; Referees: Ursula Wengenroth (SUI), John Waldow (NZL)
2 May 2023; 10:00	Report	Score by quarters: 3–3, 1–2, 5–4, 2–1			Berlin; Referees: Ursula Wengenroth (SUI), John Waldow (NZL)
2 May 2023; 10:00	Report	Pulatova 5	Goals	Aboimova 3	Berlin; Referees: Ursula Wengenroth (SUI), John Waldow (NZL)

2 May 2023; 16:00	Report	South Africa	19–5	Ukraine	Berlin; Referees: Adil Aimbetov (KAZ), John Waldow (NZL)
2 May 2023; 16:00	Report	Score by quarters: 6–0, 4–0, 7–2, 2–3			Berlin; Referees: Adil Aimbetov (KAZ), John Waldow (NZL)
2 May 2023; 16:00	Report	Versfeld 4	Goals	Aboimova 2	Berlin; Referees: Adil Aimbetov (KAZ), John Waldow (NZL)

2 May 2023; 17:30	Report	Uzbekistan	7–22	Israel	Berlin; Referees: Maxim Gerasimov (GBR), Sander Gransjean (NED)
2 May 2023; 17:30	Report	Score by quarters: 2–6, 3–5, 1–5, 1–6			Berlin; Referees: Maxim Gerasimov (GBR), Sander Gransjean (NED)
2 May 2023; 17:30	Report	Sayfiddinova 3	Goals	Strugo 6	Berlin; Referees: Maxim Gerasimov (GBR), Sander Gransjean (NED)

3 May 2023; 14:00	Report	Uzbekistan	8–12	South Africa	Berlin; Referees: Hendrik Schopp (GER), Maxim Gerasimov (GBR)
3 May 2023; 14:00	Report	Score by quarters: 2–6, 2–1, 0–3, 4–4			Berlin; Referees: Hendrik Schopp (GER), Maxim Gerasimov (GBR)
3 May 2023; 14:00	Report	Sayfiddinova 5	Goals	Meecham, Versfeld 4	Berlin; Referees: Hendrik Schopp (GER), Maxim Gerasimov (GBR)

3 May 2023; 15:45	Report	Ukraine	2–26	Israel	Berlin; Referees: Adil Aimbetov (KAZ), John Waldow (NZL)
3 May 2023; 15:45	Report	Score by quarters: 0–9, 0–5, 2–8, 0–4			Berlin; Referees: Adil Aimbetov (KAZ), John Waldow (NZL)
3 May 2023; 15:45	Report	Belinska, Danylina 1	Goals	Strugo 7	Berlin; Referees: Adil Aimbetov (KAZ), John Waldow (NZL)

=== Group B ===
Pos	Team	Pld	W	PW	PL	L	GF	GA	GD	Pts	Qualification
1	New Zealand	3	3	0	0	0	50	21	+29	9	Crossover
2	Kazakhstan	3	2	0	0	1	34	29	+5	6	Crossover
3	Germany (H)	3	1	0	0	2	28	35	−7	3	
4	Great Britain	3	0	0	0	3	26	53	−27	0	

Source: World Aquatics
Rules for classification: 1) points; 2) goal difference; 3) head-to-head result.
(H) Host

2 May 2023; 11:30	Report	New Zealand	23–7	Great Britain	Berlin; Referees: Viktoriya Markova (UZB), George Makharadze (UKR)
2 May 2023; 11:30	Report	Score by quarters: 7–0, 4–1, 7–3, 5–3			Berlin; Referees: Viktoriya Markova (UZB), George Makharadze (UKR)
2 May 2023; 11:30	Report	Houghton 6	Goals	Clapperton 4	Berlin; Referees: Viktoriya Markova (UZB), George Makharadze (UKR)

2 May 2023; 13:00	Report	Kazakhstan	11–7	Germany	Berlin; Referees: Dasch Barber (RSA), Sander Gransjean (NED)
2 May 2023; 13:00	Report	Score by quarters: 4–5, 3–0, 3–2, 1–0			Berlin; Referees: Dasch Barber (RSA), Sander Gransjean (NED)
2 May 2023; 13:00	Report	Khritankova, Tsoy 3	Goals	Deike 4	Berlin; Referees: Dasch Barber (RSA), Sander Gransjean (NED)

2 May 2023; 19:00	Report	Kazakhstan	15–7	Great Britain	Berlin; Referees: Tal Shildan (ISR), Dasch Barber (RSA)
2 May 2023; 19:00	Report	Score by quarters: 2–2, 5–1, 5–2, 3–2			Berlin; Referees: Tal Shildan (ISR), Dasch Barber (RSA)
2 May 2023; 19:00	Report	Pochinok 5	Goals	Clapperton 4	Berlin; Referees: Tal Shildan (ISR), Dasch Barber (RSA)

2 May 2023; 20:30	Report	New Zealand	12–6	Germany	Berlin; Referees: Ursula Wengenroth (SUI), George Makharadze (UKR)
2 May 2023; 20:30	Report	Score by quarters: 3–2, 4–0, 1–3, 4–1			Berlin; Referees: Ursula Wengenroth (SUI), George Makharadze (UKR)
2 May 2023; 20:30	Report	Doyle 4	Goals	Krukenberg 3	Berlin; Referees: Ursula Wengenroth (SUI), George Makharadze (UKR)

3 May 2023; 17:30	Report	Kazakhstan	8–15	New Zealand	Berlin; Referees: Ursula Wengenroth (SUI), Sander Gransjean (NED)
3 May 2023; 17:30	Report	Score by quarters: 2–2, 2–4, 1–4, 3–5			Berlin; Referees: Ursula Wengenroth (SUI), Sander Gransjean (NED)
3 May 2023; 17:30	Report	three players 2	Goals	McDowall 5	Berlin; Referees: Ursula Wengenroth (SUI), Sander Gransjean (NED)

3 May 2023; 19:15	Report	Germany	15–12	Great Britain	Berlin; Referees: Tal Shildan (ISR), George Makharadze (UKR)
3 May 2023; 19:15	Report	Score by quarters: 3–3, 4–3, 3–2, 5–4			Berlin; Referees: Tal Shildan (ISR), George Makharadze (UKR)
3 May 2023; 19:15	Report	Deike 4	Goals	Clapperton 6	Berlin; Referees: Tal Shildan (ISR), George Makharadze (UKR)

=== Classification games ===
4 May 2023; 14:00	Report	Great Britain	10–4	Ukraine	Berlin; Referees: Viktoriya Markova (UZB), Dasch Barber (RSA)
4 May 2023; 14:00	Report	Score by quarters: 3–1, 2–1, 1–2, 4–0			Berlin; Referees: Viktoriya Markova (UZB), Dasch Barber (RSA)
4 May 2023; 14:00	Report	Nurthen, Rogers 4	Goals	Zelenko 2	Berlin; Referees: Viktoriya Markova (UZB), Dasch Barber (RSA)

4 May 2023; 17:30	Report	Germany	15–8	Uzbekistan	Berlin; Referees: Maxim Gerasimov (GBR), Tal Shildan (ISR)
4 May 2023; 17:30	Report	Score by quarters: 2–2, 2–1, 5–2, 6–3			Berlin; Referees: Maxim Gerasimov (GBR), Tal Shildan (ISR)
4 May 2023; 17:30	Report	Deike 4	Goals	Sayfiddinova 4	Berlin; Referees: Maxim Gerasimov (GBR), Tal Shildan (ISR)

=== Crossover ===
The winners qualified for the super final.

4 May 2023; 15:45	Report	Israel	19–8	Kazakhstan	Berlin; Referees: Hendrik Schopp (GER), George Makharadze (UKR)
4 May 2023; 15:45	Report	Score by quarters: 3–1, 4–2, 6–2, 6–3			Berlin; Referees: Hendrik Schopp (GER), George Makharadze (UKR)
4 May 2023; 15:45	Report	Bogachenko 5	Goals	Khritankova 4	Berlin; Referees: Hendrik Schopp (GER), George Makharadze (UKR)

4 May 2023; 19:15	Report	New Zealand	16–3	South Africa	Berlin; Referees: Sander Gransjean (NED), Adil Aimbetov (KAZ)
4 May 2023; 19:15	Report	Score by quarters: 2–0, 4–1, 6–0, 4–2			Berlin; Referees: Sander Gransjean (NED), Adil Aimbetov (KAZ)
4 May 2023; 19:15	Report	Houghton 4	Goals	Penney 2	Berlin; Referees: Sander Gransjean (NED), Adil Aimbetov (KAZ)

== Super final ==
2023 World Aquatics Women's Water Polo World Cup
Tournament details
- Host country: United States
- Venue: 1 (in 1 host city)
- Dates: 23–25 June
- Teams: 8 (from 3 confederations)

Final positions
- Champions: United States (5th title)
- Runners-up: Netherlands
- Third place: Spain
- Fourth place: Hungary

Tournament statistics
- Matches played: 12
- Goals scored: 293 (24.42 per match)

Awards
- Best player: (Spain) Anni Espar
- Best goalkeeper: (United States) Amanda Longan

The tournament took place at the Long Beach City College in Long Beach, United States between 23 and 25 June 2023. The quarterfinal matchups were announced on 7 May 2023.

=== Bracket ===
Quarter-finals
23 June
New Zealand	5
Netherlands	15
23 June
Spain	12
Italy	5
23 June
United States	16
Israel	6
23 June
Hungary	20
Greece	13

Semi-finals
24 June
Netherlands	12
Spain	8
24 June
United States	16
Hungary	10

Final
25 June
Netherlands	11
United States	12
Third place
25 June
Spain	18
Hungary	15

Fifth place bracket

5–8th place semifinals
24 June
New Zealand	7
Italy	17
24 June
Israel	11
Greece	22

Fifth place
25 June
Italy	9
Greece	10
Seventh place
25 June
New Zealand	11
Israel	12

All times are local (UTC−7).

=== Quarterfinals ===
23 June 2023; 13:00	Report	Hungary	20–13	Greece	Long Beach; Referees: Danielle Dabbaghian (USA), Fiona Haigh (AUS)
23 June 2023; 13:00	Report	Score by quarters: 6–2, 6–4, 3–2, 5–5			Long Beach; Referees: Danielle Dabbaghian (USA), Fiona Haigh (AUS)
23 June 2023; 13:00	Report	Keszthelyi 6	Goals	three players 3	Long Beach; Referees: Danielle Dabbaghian (USA), Fiona Haigh (AUS)

23 June 2023; 15:00	Report	Spain	12–5	Italy	Long Beach; Referees: Gabriella Várkonyi (HUN), Diana Dutilh (NED)
23 June 2023; 15:00	Report	Score by quarters: 2–2, 4–2, 4–1, 2–0			Long Beach; Referees: Gabriella Várkonyi (HUN), Diana Dutilh (NED)
23 June 2023; 15:00	Report	E. Ruiz 4	Goals	Giustini 2	Long Beach; Referees: Gabriella Várkonyi (HUN), Diana Dutilh (NED)

23 June 2023; 17:00	Report	United States	16–6	Israel	Long Beach; Referees: Maria Daskalopoulou (GRE), Asumi Tsuzaki (JPN)
23 June 2023; 17:00	Report	Score by quarters: 5–0, 4–3, 3–0, 4–3			Long Beach; Referees: Maria Daskalopoulou (GRE), Asumi Tsuzaki (JPN)
23 June 2023; 17:00	Report	Flynn 3	Goals	Bogachenko 2	Long Beach; Referees: Maria Daskalopoulou (GRE), Asumi Tsuzaki (JPN)

23 June 2023; 19:00	Report	New Zealand	5–15	Netherlands	Long Beach; Referees: Jaume Teixidó (ESP), Giuliana Nicolosi (ITA)
23 June 2023; 19:00	Report	Score by quarters: 1–2, 1–4, 0–6, 3–3			Long Beach; Referees: Jaume Teixidó (ESP), Giuliana Nicolosi (ITA)
23 June 2023; 19:00	Report	Houghton 3	Goals	Van de Kraats, Sleeking 3	Long Beach; Referees: Jaume Teixidó (ESP), Giuliana Nicolosi (ITA)

=== 5–8th place semifinals ===
24 June 2023; 13:00	Report	Israel	11–22	Greece	Long Beach; Referees: Megan Perry (NZL), Jaume Teixidó (ESP)
24 June 2023; 13:00	Report	Score by quarters: 2–4, 2–5, 4–7, 3–6			Long Beach; Referees: Megan Perry (NZL), Jaume Teixidó (ESP)
24 June 2023; 13:00	Report	three players 2	Goals	Ninou 4	Long Beach; Referees: Megan Perry (NZL), Jaume Teixidó (ESP)

24 June 2023; 15:00	Report	New Zealand	7–17	Italy	Long Beach; Referees: Diana Dutilh (NED), Gabriella Várkonyi (HUN)
24 June 2023; 15:00	Report	Score by quarters: 3–6, 4–6, 0–4, 0–1			Long Beach; Referees: Diana Dutilh (NED), Gabriella Várkonyi (HUN)
24 June 2023; 15:00	Report	Doyle 3	Goals	Avegno 6	Long Beach; Referees: Diana Dutilh (NED), Gabriella Várkonyi (HUN)

=== Semifinals ===
24 June 2023; 17:00	Report	United States	16–10	Hungary	Long Beach; Referees: Fiona Haigh (AUS), Giuliana Nicolosi (ITA)
24 June 2023; 17:00	Report	Score by quarters: 3–4, 4–2, 4–2, 5–2			Long Beach; Referees: Fiona Haigh (AUS), Giuliana Nicolosi (ITA)
24 June 2023; 17:00	Report	Flynn, Musselman 3	Goals	Garda 4	Long Beach; Referees: Fiona Haigh (AUS), Giuliana Nicolosi (ITA)

24 June 2023; 19:00	Report	Netherlands	12–8	Spain	Long Beach; Referees: Maria Daskalopoulou (GRE), Tal Shildan (ISR)
24 June 2023; 19:00	Report	Score by quarters: 1–2, 4–2, 4–2, 3–2			Long Beach; Referees: Maria Daskalopoulou (GRE), Tal Shildan (ISR)
24 June 2023; 19:00	Report	L. Rogge 4	Goals	three players 2	Long Beach; Referees: Maria Daskalopoulou (GRE), Tal Shildan (ISR)

=== Seventh place game ===
25 June 2023; 13:00	Report	New Zealand	11–12	Israel	Long Beach; Referees: Asumi Tsuzaki (JPN), Danielle Dabbaghian (USA)
25 June 2023; 13:00	Report	Score by quarters: 4–4, 2–4, 3–3, 2–1			Long Beach; Referees: Asumi Tsuzaki (JPN), Danielle Dabbaghian (USA)
25 June 2023; 13:00	Report	Houghton 4	Goals	Yaacobi 5	Long Beach; Referees: Asumi Tsuzaki (JPN), Danielle Dabbaghian (USA)

=== Fifth place game ===
25 June 2023; 15:00	Report	Italy	9–10	Greece	Long Beach; Referees: Diana Dutilh (NED), Megan Perry (NZL)
25 June 2023; 15:00	Report	Score by quarters: 3–3, 3–1, 1–3, 2–3			Long Beach; Referees: Diana Dutilh (NED), Megan Perry (NZL)
25 June 2023; 15:00	Report	Marletta 3	Goals	Xenaki 4	Long Beach; Referees: Diana Dutilh (NED), Megan Perry (NZL)

=== Bronze medal game ===
25 June 2023; 17:00	Report	Spain	18–15	Hungary	Long Beach; Referees: Tal Shildan (ISR), Giuliana Nicolosi (ITA)
25 June 2023; 17:00	Report	Score by quarters: 5–4, 6–5, 4–2, 3–4			Long Beach; Referees: Tal Shildan (ISR), Giuliana Nicolosi (ITA)
25 June 2023; 17:00	Report	Espar 5	Goals	Garda 6	Long Beach; Referees: Tal Shildan (ISR), Giuliana Nicolosi (ITA)

=== Gold medal game ===
25 June 2023; 19:00	Report	Netherlands	11–12	United States	Long Beach; Referees: Gabriella Várkonyi (HUN), Jaume Teixidó (ESP)
25 June 2023; 19:00	Report	Score by quarters: 2–5, 1–2, 4–3, 4–2			Long Beach; Referees: Gabriella Várkonyi (HUN), Jaume Teixidó (ESP)
25 June 2023; 19:00	Report	Keuning, Van de Kraats 3	Goals	Steffens 3	Long Beach; Referees: Gabriella Várkonyi (HUN), Jaume Teixidó (ESP)

== Final standings ==
Rank	
Gold medal	United States
Silver medal	Netherlands
Bronze medal	Spain
4.	Hungary
5.	Greece
6.	Italy
7.	Israel
8.	New Zealand

2023 FINA Women's Water Polo World Cup

United States
Fifth title

== See also ==
- 2023 FINA Men's Water Polo World Cup
