= Croatia women's national water polo team =

Croatia
- FINA code: CRO
- Association: Croatian Water Polo Federation
- Confederation: LEN (Europe)
- Head coach: Mia Šimunić
- Asst coach: Željko Josipovic; Morena Marinković
- Captain: Matea Skelin

FINA ranking (since 2008)
- Current: 17 (as of 9 August 2021)

World Championship
- Appearances: 1 (first in 2025)
- Best result: 13th (2025)

European Championship
- Appearances: 7 (first in 2010)
- Best result: 8th place (2010, 2022)

Europa Cup
- Appearances: 1 (first in 2018)
- Best result: 10th place (2018)

Media
- Website: hvs.hr

The Croatia women's national water polo team represents Croatia in international women's water polo competitions and friendly matches. The team is controlled by the Croatian Water Polo Federation.

== Results ==
=== World Championships ===
- 2025 – 13th place

=== European Championship ===
| Year | Round | Position | Pld | W | D | L | GF | GA | GD |
|---|---|---|---|---|---|---|---|---|---|
| (Croatia) 2010 | Preliminary round | 8th | 4 | 0 | 0 | 4 | 17 | 102 | −85 |
| (Netherlands) 2012 | Did not participate | | | | | | | | |
| (Hungary) 2014 | Did not participate | | | | | | | | |
| (Serbia) 2016 | Preliminary round | 11th | 6 | 1 | 0 | 5 | 33 | 106 | −73 |
| (Spain) 2018 | Preliminary round | 11th | 6 | 1 | 1 | 4 | 30 | 96 | −66 |
| (Hungary) 2020 | Preliminary round | 10th | 6 | 1 | 0 | 5 | 33 | 105 | −72 |
| (Croatia) 2022 | Quarter-finals | 8th | 8 | 2 | 0 | 6 | 66 | 126 | −60 |
| (Netherlands) 2024 | Quarter-finals | 8th | 7 | 1 | 0 | 6 | 52 | 114 | −62 |
| (Portugal) 2026 | Quarter-finals | 6th | 7 | 4 | 0 | 3 | 83 | 107 | −24 |
| Total | Qualified: 7/9 | | 44 | 10 | 1 | 33 | 314 | 756 | −442 |

==== Record against other teams at the European Championships ====
| National team | Pld | W | D | L | PF | PA | PD |
|---|---|---|---|---|---|---|---|
| France | 3 | 0 | 0 | 3 | 13 | 44 | −31 |
| Germany | 3 | 1 | 0 | 2 | 31 | 51 | −20 |
| Greece | 4 | 0 | 0 | 4 | 13 | 92 | −79 |
| Hungary | 2 | 0 | 0 | 2 | 12 | 47 | −35 |
| Italy | 4 | 0 | 0 | 4 | 16 | 93 | −77 |
| Israel | 3 | 0 | 1 | 2 | 22 | 33 | −11 |
| Netherlands | 2 | 0 | 0 | 2 | 7 | 43 | −36 |
| Romania | 1 | 1 | 0 | 0 | 15 | 6 | +9 |
| Russia | 2 | 0 | 0 | 2 | 4 | 59 | −55 |
| Serbia | 3 | 2 | 0 | 1 | 24 | 24 | 0 |
| Slovakia | 1 | 0 | 0 | 1 | 7 | 9 | −2 |
| Spain | 1 | 0 | 0 | 1 | 3 | 29 | −26 |
| Turkey | 2 | 2 | 0 | 0 | 23 | 10 | +13 |
| Total | 13 teams | | | | | | |

=== World Cup ===
| Year | Round | Position | Pld | W | D | L | GF | GA | GD |
|---|---|---|---|---|---|---|---|---|---|
| (Malta) 2026 | Semi-finals | 4th | 6 | 4 | 0 | 2 | 109 | 74 | 35 |
| Total | | | 6 | 4 | 0 | 2 | 109 | 74 | 35 |

=== Europa Cup ===
- 2018 – 10th place

== Current squad ==
Roster for the 2025 World Championships.

Head coach: Mia Simunić

- 1 Latica Medvešek GK
- 2 Aurora Stipanov FP
- 3 Ana Desnica FP
- 4 Jelena Butić FP
- 5 Magdalena Butić FP
- 6 Matea Skelin FP
- 7 Nina Maria Medić FP
- 8 Ria Glas FP
- 9 Lara Srhoj FP
- 10 Iva Rožić FP
- 11 Neli Janković FP
- 12 Nina Jazvin FP
- 13 Natasha Trojan-Jimenez GK
- 14 Roza Pešić FP
- 15 Nina Eterović FP
