= 2006 Women's European Water Polo Championship Qualifiers =

The 2006 Women's European Water Polo Championship Qualifier was split into two tournaments to determine the last four competing teams for the 2006 Women's European Water Polo Championship, held from September 2 to September 9, 2006 in Belgrade, Serbia. Already qualified for the event are hosts Serbia, Hungary, Italy and Russia.

Group A (France, Germany, Great Britain and the Netherlands) played a round robin in Nancy, France, while Group B (Czech Republic, Greece, Spain and Ukraine) competed in Madrid, Spain. Both events were held from April 7 to April 9, 2006.

== Teams ==
GROUP A — Nancy, France

- France
- Germany
- Great Britain
- Netherlands

GROUP B — Madrid, Spain

- Czech Republic
- Greece
- Spain
- Ukraine

== Group A ==
	Team	Points	G	W	D	L	GF	GA	Diff
1.	Netherlands	6	3	3	0	0	47	7	+40
2.	Germany	4	3	2	0	1	41	21	+20
3.	France	2	3	1	0	2	15	40	–25
4.	Great Britain	0	3	0	0	3	14	49	–35

- Friday April 7, 2006

Netherlands	10 – 6	Germany
France	10 – 7	Great Britain

- Saturday April 8, 2006

Netherlands	20 – 0	Great Britain
Germany	16 – 4	France

- Sunday April 9, 2006

Germany	19 – 7	Great Britain
Netherlands	17 – 1	France

== Group B ==
	Team	Points	G	W	D	L	GF	GA	Diff
1.	Greece	6	3	3	0	0	58	17	+41
2.	Spain	4	3	2	0	1	60	25	+35
3.	Czech Republic	2	3	1	0	2	26	66	–40
4.	Ukraine	0	3	0	0	3	16	52	–36

- Friday April 7, 2006

Greece	19 – 2	Ukraine
Spain	30 – 8	Czech Republic

- Saturday April 8, 2006

Czech Republic	11 – 9	Ukraine
Greece	12 – 8	Spain

- Sunday April 9, 2006

Greece	27 – 7	Czech Republic
Spain	22 – 5	Ukraine

== See also ==
- 2006 Men's European Water Polo Championship Qualifier
