= 2007 Women's European Water Polo Olympic Qualifier =

The 2007 Women's European Water Polo Olympic Qualification Tournament for the Games of the XXIX Olympiad in Beijing 2008 was held in Kirishi, Russia from August 19 to August 26, 2007. The Netherlands defeated Russia in the final and so earned a berth for the 2008 Summer Olympics Water Polo Competition.

== Preliminary round ==
=== Group A ===
	Team	Points	G	W	D	L	GF	GA	Diff
1.	Italy	7	3	2	1	0	39	20	+19
2.	Spain	6	3	2	0	1	34	24	+10
3.	Greece	4	3	1	1	1	42	22	+20
4.	Ukraine	0	3	0	0	3	17	66	–49

- August 21, 2007

Italy	8 – 8	Greece
Spain	18 – 7	Ukraine

- August 22, 2007

Ukraine	5 – 26	Greece
Italy	9 – 7	Spain

- August 23, 2007

Italy	22 – 5	Ukraine
Greece	8 – 9	Spain

=== Group B ===
	Team	Points	G	W	D	L	GF	GA	Diff
1.	Russia	10	4	3	1	0	63	34	+29
2.	Netherlands	10	4	3	1	0	50	22	+28
3.	Hungary	6	4	2	0	2	40	30	+10
4.	Germany	3	4	1	0	3	40	45	–5
5.	Czech Republic	0	4	0	0	3	23	85	–62

- August 19, 2007

Hungary	13 – 7	Germany
Russia	31 – 7	Czech Republic

- August 20, 2007

Czech Republic	8 – 16	Germany
Russia	9 – 9	Netherlands

- August 21, 2007

Germany	7 – 11	Netherlands
Czech Republic	6 – 15	Hungary

- August 22, 2007

Netherlands	7 – 4	Hungary
Germany	10 – 13	Russia

- August 23, 2007

Netherlands	23 – 2	Czech Republic
Hungary	8 – 10	Russia

== Play-Offs ==
- August 24, 2007 — 9th place

Czech Republic	13 – 11 [aet]	Ukraine

- August 25, 2007 — 7th place

Czech Republic	6 – 21	Germany

- August 25, 2007 — 5th place

Greece	3 – 6	Hungary

== Semi finals ==
- August 25, 2007

Italy	7 – 11	Netherlands
Russia	12 – 8	Spain

== Finals ==
- August 26, 2007 — 3rd place

Italy	8 – 6	Spain

- August 26, 2007 — 1st place

Netherlands	13 – 12 [aet]	Russia

== Final ranking ==
RANK	TEAM
1.	Netherlands
2.	Russia
3.	Italy
4.	Spain
5.	Hungary
6.	Greece
7.	Germany
8.	Czech Republic
9.	Ukraine

- Netherlands qualified for the 2008 Summer Olympics in Beijing, PR China; Teams placed from 6th up to 2nd will play in the 2008 FINA Olympic Qualification Tournament in Imperia, Italy

== See also ==
- 2007 European Water Polo Olympic Qualification Tournament
