= 2012 Water Polo Olympic Test Event =

The Visa Water Polo International was the test event for the Water Polo Arena for the 2012 Summer Olympics. It took place from 3–6 May 2012.

Four women's international water polo teams were invited to participate: Great Britain, Australia, the United States, and Hungary. There were two rounds. In the preliminary round, each of the teams will play each other once. All teams will then progress to the final round, where the first- and second-placed teams from the preliminary round play off for the gold medal, and the third- and fourth-placed teams for the bronze medal.

== Preliminary round ==
All times are British Summer Time (UTC+1)

	Team	P	W	D	L	GF	GA	Diff	Points
1.	Australia	0	0	0	0	0	0	0	0
2.	Great Britain	0	0	0	0	0	0	0	0
3.	Hungary	0	0	0	0	0	0	0	0
4.	United States	0	0	0	0	0	0	0	0

3 May 2012; 18:30	United States	11–6	Hungary
3 May 2012; 18:30	Score by quarters: 4-2, 4-3, 2-1, 1-0

3 May 2012 following	Great Britain	4–10	Australia
3 May 2012 following	Score by quarters: 1-2, 1-2, 1-2, 1-4

4 May 2012; 18:30	Australia	9–10	United States
4 May 2012; 18:30	Score by quarters: 2-2, 3-3, 2-2, 2-3

4 May 2012 following	Great Britain	10–17	Hungary
4 May 2012 following	Score by quarters: 4-5, 1-4, 3-3, 2-5

5 May 2012; 14:00	Hungary	12–17	Australia
5 May 2012; 14:00	Score by quarters: 1-5, 3-2, 4-5, 4-5

5 May 2012 following	Great Britain	6–7	United States
5 May 2012 following	Score by quarters: 1-4, 3-1, 0-1, 2-1

== Final round ==
All times are British Summer Time (UTC+1)

=== Bronze medal match ===
6 May 2012; 10:00	Hungary	11–4	Great Britain
6 May 2012; 10:00	Score by quarters: 2-1, 2-0, 5-1, 2-2

=== Gold medal match ===
6 May 2012 following	United States	5–6	Australia
6 May 2012 following	Score by quarters: 2-1, 1-3, 2-2, 0-0

== Final ranking ==
RANK	TEAM
	Australia
	United States
	Hungary
4.	Great Britain
