= 2006 Men's European Water Polo Championship Qualifiers =

The 2006 Men's European Water Polo Championship Qualifier was split into three tournaments to determine the last six competing teams for the 2006 Men's European Water Polo Championship, held from September 1 to September 10, 2006 in Belgrade, Serbia.

Group A (France, Slovenia, Slovakia and Malta) played a round robin in Kranj, Slovenia, while Group B (Greece, Netherlands, Poland and Moldova) competed in Eindhoven, Netherlands. Group C was contested in Imperia, Italy with Belarus, Italy, Romania and Turkey. All three events were held from April 7 to April 9, 2006.

== Teams ==
GROUP A — Kranj, Slovenia

- France
- Malta
- Slovenia
- Slovakia

GROUP B — Eindhoven, Netherlands

- Greece
- Moldova
- Netherlands
- Poland

GROUP C — Imperia, Italy

- Belarus
- Italy
- Romania
- Turkey

== Group A ==
	Team	Points	G	W	D	L	GF	GA	Diff
1.	Slovenia	6	3	3	0	0	29	19	+10
2.	Slovakia	4	3	2	0	1	32	24	+8
3.	France	2	3	1	0	2	33	27	+6
4.	Malta	0	3	0	0	3	17	41	–24

- Friday April 7, 2006

Slovenia	9 – 7	France
Slovakia	15 – 4	Malta

- Saturday April 8, 2006

Slovakia	11 – 10	France
Slovenia	10 – 6	Malta

- Sunday April 9, 2006

France	16 – 7	Malta
Slovenia	10 – 6	Slovakia

== Group B ==
	Team	Points	G	W	D	L	GF	GA	Diff
1.	Greece	6	3	3	0	0	53	18	+35
2.	Netherlands	4	3	2	0	1	38	20	+18
3.	Poland	2	3	1	0	2	25	43	–18
4.	Moldova	0	3	0	0	3	20	55	–35

- Friday April 7, 2006

Greece	25 – 7	Moldova
Netherlands	14 – 8	Poland

- Saturday April 8, 2006

Netherlands	17 – 3	Moldova
Greece	19 – 4	Poland

- Sunday April 9, 2006

Poland	13 – 10	Moldova
Netherlands	7 – 9	Greece

== Group C ==
	Team	Points	G	W	D	L	GF	GA	Diff
1.	Italy	6	3	3	0	0	54	8	+46
2.	Romania	4	3	2	0	1	35	21	+14
3.	Turkey	2	3	1	0	2	16	33	–17
4.	Belarus	0	3	0	0	3	6	49	–43

- Friday April 7, 2006

Italy	12 – 5	Romania
Turkey	8 – 2	Belarus

- Saturday April 8, 2006

Romania	18 – 4	Belarus
Italy	19 – 3	Turkey

- Sunday April 9, 2006

Romania	12 – 5	Turkey
Italy	23 – 0	Belarus

== See also ==
- 2006 Women's European Water Polo Championship Qualifier
