= 2006 Women's European Water Polo Championship =

Tournament details
- Host country: Serbia
- Venue: 1 (in 1 host city)
- Dates: 2 – 9 September
- Teams: 8 (from 1 confederation)

Final positions
- Champions: Russia (1st title)
- Runners-up: Italy
- Third place: Hungary
- Fourth place: Spain

Tournament statistics
- Top scorer(s): Ekaterina Pantyulina (RUS) (18)

Awards
- Best player: Tania di Mario (ITA)

The 2006 Women's European Water Polo Championship was the eleventh edition of the now tri-annual event, organised by the Europe's governing body in aquatics, the Ligue Européenne de Natation. The event took place in the Banjica Sports Center in Belgrade, Serbia from September 2 to September 9, 2006.

There were two qualification tournaments ahead of the event, held from April 7 to April 9, 2006 in Nancy, France (with France, Germany, Great Britain and the Netherlands competing) and in Madrid, Spain (Czech Republic, Greece, Spain and Ukraine).

== Teams ==
Group A

- Hungary
- Netherlands
- Serbia
- Spain

Group B

- Germany
- Greece
- Italy
- Russia

== Preliminary round ==
=== Group A ===
	Team	Points	G	W	D	L	GF	GA	Diff
1.	Hungary	7	3	2	1	0	41	18	+23
2.	Spain	7	3	2	1	0	37	23	+14
3.	Netherlands	3	3	1	0	2	33	29	+4
4.	Serbia	0	3	0	0	3	14	55	−41

- Saturday September 2, 2006

Serbia	4–17	Spain
Netherlands	6–11	Hungary

- Sunday September 3, 2006

Serbia	6–16	Netherlands
Spain	8–8	Hungary

- Monday September 4, 2006

Netherlands	11–12	Spain
Serbia	4–22	Hungary

=== Group B ===
	Team	Points	G	W	D	L	GF	GA	Diff
1.	Italy	9	3	3	0	0	39	27	+12
2.	Russia	6	3	2	0	1	45	31	+14
3.	Greece	3	3	1	0	2	26	32	−6
4.	Germany	0	3	0	0	3	28	48	−20

- Saturday September 2, 2006

Russia	15–6	Greece
Italy	17–8	Germany

- Sunday September 3, 2006

Greece	13–9	Germany
Russia	12–14	Italy

- Monday September 4, 2006

Germany	11–18	Russia
Italy	8–7	Greece

== Quarterfinals ==
- Wednesday September 6, 2006

Russia	17–11	Netherlands
Spain	10–9	Greece

== Semifinals ==
- Thursday September 7, 2006

Italy	15–10	Spain
Russia	12–11	Hungary

== Finals ==
- Wednesday September 6, 2006 — Seventh place

Serbia	6–15	Germany

- Thursday September 7, 2006 — Fifth place

Greece	11 – 12 [aet]	Netherlands

- Saturday September 9, 2006 — Bronze Medal

Hungary	12–11	Spain

- Saturday September 9, 2006 — Gold Medal

Russia	12–10	Italy

== Final ranking ==
RANK	TEAM
	Russia
	Italy
	Hungary
4.	Spain
5.	Netherlands
6.	Greece
7.	Germany
8.	Serbia

2006 Women's European champion

Russia
First title

== Individual awards ==
- Most Valuable Player
  - Tania di Mario (ITA)
- Best Goalkeeper
  - Elena Gigli (ITA)
- Topscorer
  - Ekaterina Pantyulina (RUS) — 18 goals
