= Czech Republic women's national water polo team =

National sports team

The Czech Republic women's national water polo team represents Czech Republic in international women's water polo competitions and friendly matches.

== Competitions ==
It took part into:

- 1995 Women's European Water Polo Championship
- 1997 Women's European Water Polo Championship
- 2006 Women's European Water Polo Championship Qualifiers
- 2007 Women's European Water Polo Olympic Qualifier
- 2018 Women's European Water Polo Championship Qualifiers
- 2020 Women's European Water Polo Championship Qualifiers
- Water polo at the 2024 Summer Olympics – Women's qualification
- 2024 Women's European Water Polo Championship Qualifiers
- 2024 Women's European Water Polo Championship
