= FINA Water Polo World Rankings =

Water Polo World Ranking

The World Aquatics Water Polo World Rankings, formerly the FINA Water Polo World Rankings, are World Aquatics' ranking system for national teams in water polo.

The ranking system, introduced in 2025, compares teams based on the weighted average rating points they earn in games over the last eight years. Teams earn a certain amount of rating points for each game based on the margin of victory/defeat, site of game and strength of opponent. Each game's rating points are then weighted by factors including the time of game, competition/region, competition stage and round reached.

The ranking system produces four separate rankings: Men's, Women's, Boys and Girls. The Boys' and Girls' age group rankings are based on combined results across all age divisions from under-16 to under-20 matches.

== History ==
In their previous ranking system, World Aquatics (formerly FINA) awarded teams points based on placements in final tournaments including the Olympic Games, World Championships and continental championships.

== Calculation ==
Teams are ranked based on the total points they earn in all matches played over the last eight years as follows:

$$TP = \sum_{i}RPi \cdot MWi$$

where:

- TP – Total points
- $RPi$ – Rating points for match $i$
- $MWi$ – Match Weighting for match $i$

=== Rating Points (RP) ===
Teams earn a certain amount of rating points per match based on the margin of victory/defeat, site of game and strength of their opponent, calculated as follows:

$$RP = BP + HAP + ORP$$

where:

- $RP$ – Rating Points
- $RP$ – Basis Points
- $HAP$ – : Home, Away and Neutral Matches Points
- $ORP$ – Opposition Ranking Points

Basis Points

Teams are awarded basis points based on the margin of victory/defeat as follows:

Victory margin	Points to winning team	Points to losing team
Penalty shoot-out	60	40
1–4 goals	65	35
5–10 goals	70	30
11 or more goals	75	25
Forfeit	70	0

Home, Away and Neutral matches Points

Teams are awarded or deducted points based on the site of the game as follows:

Site of game	Points
Home game	−3 points
Neutral venue	No adjustment
Away game	+3 points

Opposition Ranking Points

To account for strength of opposition, teams are awarded points based on the ranking of their opponent, calculated as:

$$ORP = 1.5 \cdot (WPWR - OR)$$

where:

- WPWR – Ranking of lowest-ranked team in the Water Polo World Rankings
- OR – Ranking of opponent

=== Match Weight (MW) ===
The Rating Points a team earns for a match is weighted by the Match Weight, calculated as follows:

$$MW = TD \cdot C \cdot R$$

where:

- $MW$ – Match Weight
- $RP$ – Time Decay factor
- $HAP$ – Competition Weight
- $ORP$ – Round weight

Time Decay

Time Decay (TD) factor is calculated as follows:

$$TD =1 - \frac{t}{2922}$$

where $t$ is the "scoring age" of the event:

- 0 - less than 2 years since match
- 730.5 - 2–4 years since match
- 1461 - 4–6 years since match
- 2191 - 6–8 years since match
- 2922 - greater than 8 years since match (not taken into consideration)

Competition Weight

Event tier	Competition/Region	Weighting
Tier 1	Olympic Games	3
Tier 1	World Aquatics Championships	2
Tier 1	Other events	1.5
Tier 2	All events	1
Tier 3	Africa	0.35
Tier 3	Americas	0.75
Tier 3	Asia	0.75
Tier 3	Europe	1
Tier 3	Oceania	0.5
Tier 4 and 5	Africa	0.2
Tier 4 and 5	Americas	0.5
Tier 4 and 5	Asia	0.5
Tier 4 and 5	Europe	0.75
Tier 4 and 5	Oceania	0.2

Competition Stage

Event tier	Stage/Round	Weighting
Tiers 1, 2 and 3	Preliminaries	0.2
Tiers 1, 2 and 3	Crossovers	0.3
Tiers 1, 2 and 3	Classification match	0.4
Tiers 1, 2 and 3	Quarter-finals	0.6
Tiers 1, 2 and 3	Semi-finals	0.8
Tiers 1, 2 and 3	Bronze medal match	0.8
Tiers 1, 2 and 3	Gold medal match	1
Tiers 4 and 5	All Matches	0.2
