= Great Britain women's national water polo team =

Great Britain
- FINA code: GBR
- Association: British Swimming
- Confederation: LEN (Europe)
- Head coach: Jo Mountfield; Theo Nousios
- Captain: Katherine Rogers

FINA ranking (since 2008)
- Highest: 8 (2012)

Olympic Games
- Appearances: 1 (first in 2012)
- Best result: 8th place (2012)

World Championship
- Appearances: 5 (first in 1986)
- Best result: 9th place (1986)

European Championship
- Appearances: 4 (first in 2012)
- Best result: 7th (2012, 2024)

Media
- Website: britishswimming.org

The Great Britain women's water polo team is a water polo team that represented Great Britain at the London 2012 Olympics, where they made their Olympic debut.

== Results ==
=== Olympic Games ===
- 2012 — 8th place

=== World Championship ===
- 1986 – 9th place
- 2003 – 16th place
- 2013 – 13th place
- 2024 – 11th place
- 2025 – 11th place

=== European Championship ===
- 2012 – 7th place
- 2014 – 8th place
- 2024 – 7th place
- 2026 – 9th place

=== European Games ===
- 2015 – 11th place

== Roster ==
Roster for the 2025 World Championships.

Head coach: Jo Mountfield / Theo Nousios

- 1 Sophie Jackson GK
- 2 Amelie Cornell FP
- 3 lily RossFP
- 4 Cecily Turner FP
- 5 Toula Falvey FP
- 6 Katie Brown FP
- 7 Katy Cutler FP
- 8 Brooke Tafazolli FP
- 9 Katherine Rogers FP
- 10 Amelia Peters FP
- 11 Lucy Blenkinship FP
- 12 Izzy Howe FP
- 13 Cassidy Ball GK
- 14 Harriet Dickens FP

== See also ==
- Great Britain men's national water polo team
- Great Britain Water Polo Juniors
