= Romania women's national water polo team =

Romania
- FINA code: ROU
- Association: Romanian Water Polo Federation
- Confederation: LEN (Europe)
- Head coach: Berttini-Andrei Nenciu
- Asst coach: Edward Andrei

European Championship
- Appearances: 3 (first in 2022)
- Best result: 11th (2022)

The Romania women's national water polo team is the representative for Romania in international women's water polo.

== European Championship record ==
- 2022 – 11th
- 2024 – 14th
- 2026 – 16th
