= Slovakia women's national water polo team =

Slovakia
- FINA code: SVK
- Association: Slovak Water Polo Union
- Confederation: LEN (Europe)
- Head coach: Szabolcs Eschwig-Hajts
- Asst coach: Rastislav Lipták
- Captain: Janka Kurucová

FINA ranking (since 2008)
- Current: 16 (as of 9 August 2021)

European Championship
- Appearances: 5 (first in 1993)
- Best result: 8th (2020)

The Slovakia women's national water polo team is the representative for Slovakia in international women's water polo. Slovakia will perform at the 2020 Women's European Water Polo Championship for the second time.

== European Championship record ==
- 1993 – 12th
- 2020 – 8th
- 2022 – 12th
- 2024 – 15th
- 2026 – 15th

== Current squad ==
Roster for the 2020 Women's European Water Polo Championship.

Head coach: Milan Heinrich

No	Name	Pos.	Date of birth	Height	Weight	L/R	Caps	Club
1	Emőke Kissová	GK	8 April 2002 (age 24)	1.73 m (5 ft 8 in)	67 kg (148 lb)	R		(Hungary) Orvosegyetem SC
2	Beáta Kováčiková	AR	4 October 1999 (age 27)	1.70 m (5 ft 7 in)	65 kg (143 lb)	R		(Slovakia) Slávia UK Bratislava
3	Janka Kurucová	CB	28 November 1998 (age 27)	1.74 m (5 ft 9 in)	69 kg (152 lb)	R		(Slovakia) ŠG Olympia Košice
4	Lenka Garančovská	W	3 February 2003 (age 23)	1.70 m (5 ft 7 in)	56 kg (123 lb)	R		(Slovakia) ŠG Olympia Košice
5	Emma Junasová	AR	17 February 2002 (age 24)	1.83 m (6 ft 0 in)	85 kg (187 lb)	R		(Slovakia) ŠG Olympia Košice
6	Monika Sedláková	AR	6 December 2002 (age 23)	1.69 m (5 ft 7 in)	69 kg (152 lb)	R		(Hungary) Tatabányai Vízmű SE
7	Natália Pecková	AR	27 August 1997 (age 29)	1.68 m (5 ft 6 in)	59 kg (130 lb)	R		(Slovakia) Slávia UK Bratislava
8	Tamara Kolářová	W	4 December 2002 (age 23)	1.68 m (5 ft 6 in)	67 kg (148 lb)	R		(Hungary) Egri VK
9	Miroslava Stankovianska	CF	10 October 2000 (age 26)	1.67 m (5 ft 6 in)	80 kg (176 lb)	L		(Italy) Vela Nuoto Ancona
10	Ivana Majláthová	W	5 March 1998 (age 28)	1.73 m (5 ft 8 in)	65 kg (143 lb)	R		(Slovakia) Slávia UK Bratislava
11	Daniela Kátlovská	W	16 November 1995 (age 30)	1.72 m (5 ft 8 in)	75 kg (165 lb)	R		(Romania) CS Rapid București
12	Katarína Kissová	CF	17 April 2002 (age 24)	1.75 m (5 ft 9 in)	75 kg (165 lb)	R		(Slovakia) Slávia UK Bratislava
13	Kristina Horváthová (C)	GK	9 May 1999 (age 27)	1.83 m (6 ft 0 in)	80 kg (176 lb)	R		(Slovakia) ŠG Olympia Košice

== Under-20 team ==
Slovakia lastly competed at the 2021 FINA Junior Water Polo World Championships.
