= Israel women's national water polo team =

Israel
- FINA code: ISR
- Confederation: LEN (Europe)
- Head coach: Dimitrios Mavrotas
- Asst coach: Sotiris Zoumpoulias
- Captain: Ayelet Peres

FINA ranking (since 2008)
- Current: 15 (as of 9 August 2021)

World Championship
- Appearances: 1 (first in 2023)
- Best result: 10th place (2023)

World Cup
- Appearances: 1 (first in 2023)
- Best result: 7th (2023)

European Championship
- Appearances: 5 (first in 2018)
- Best result: 6th place (2022)

The Israel women's national water polo team represents Israel in international women's water polo competitions and friendly matches.

== Tournament record ==
=== World Championship ===
- 2023 – 10th place

=== European Championship ===
- 2018 – 10th place
- 2020 – 9th place
- 2022 – 6th place
- 2024 – 9th place
- 2026 – 7th place

=== World Cup ===
- 2023 – 7th place

== Current squad ==
Roster for the 2023 World Aquatics Championships.

Head coach: Dimitris Mavrotas

- 1 Maria Bogachenko GK
- 2 Yahav Farkash FP
- 3 Hila Futorian FP
- 4 Ronny Gazit FP
- 5 Michal Katz FP
- 6 Veronika Kordonskaia FP
- 7 Tahel Levi FP
- 8 Noga Levinshtein FP
- 9 Noa Markovsky FP
- 10 Dar Menakerman FP
- 11 Dina Namakshtansky FP
- 12 Ayelet Peres FP
- 13 Noa Sasover GK
- Shunit Strugo FP
- Alma Yaacobi FP

== Under-20 team ==
Israel made its debut at the 2021 FINA Junior Water Polo World Championships.
