= Serbia women's national water polo team =

Serbian water polo team

Serbia
- FINA code: SRB
- Association: Water Polo Association of Serbia
- Confederation: LEN (Europe)
- Head coach: Dragana Ivković
- Asst coach: Ivana Ćorović; Eltina Dimitrijević
- Captain: Jelena Vuković

FINA ranking (since 2008)
- Current: 27 (as of August 2026)

European Championship
- Appearances: 8 (first in 1997)
- Best result: 8th place (2006)

Media
- Website: waterpoloserbia.org

The Serbia women's national water polo team represents Serbia in international water polo competitions and is controlled by the Water Polo Association of Serbia. It was known as the Yugoslavia women's national water polo team until February 2003 and the Serbia and Montenegro national water polo team until June 2006.

== European Championship record ==
- 1997 – 9th place
- 2006 – 8th place
- 2016 – 9th place
- 2018 – 9th place
- 2020 – 12th place
- 2022 – 9th place
- 2024 – 10th place
- 2026 – 10th place

== Current squad ==
Roster for the 2020 Women's European Water Polo Championship.

Head coach: Dragana Ivković

No	Name	Pos.	Date of birth	Height	Weight	L/R	Caps	Club
1	Vanja Lazić	GK	24 June 1994 (age 32)	1.71 m (5 ft 7 in)	64 kg (141 lb)	R	20	(Serbia) VK Crvena zvezda
2	Katarina Čegar	AR	1 June 1995 (age 31)	1.72 m (5 ft 8 in)	69 kg (152 lb)	R	50	(Serbia) VK Crvena zvezda
3	Jovana Pantović	AR	5 February 1993 (age 33)	1.72 m (5 ft 8 in)	66 kg (146 lb)	R	51	(Serbia) VK Crvena zvezda
4	Teodora Rudić	AR	2 April 1998 (age 28)	1.75 m (5 ft 9 in)	63 kg (139 lb)	R	46	(Serbia) VK Palilula
5	Nina Josifović	AR	17 January 2000 (age 26)	1.68 m (5 ft 6 in)	56 kg (123 lb)	R		(Spain) CN Atlètic-Barceloneta
6	Anja Mišković	W	23 January 2002 (age 24)	1.70 m (5 ft 7 in)	70 kg (154 lb)	R	30	(Serbia) VK Crvena zvezda
7	Mila Gluščević	AR	19 July 1996 (age 30)	1.75 m (5 ft 9 in)	70 kg (154 lb)	R		(Serbia) VK Palilula
8	Nada Mandić	CF	19 September 1997 (age 28)	1.85 m (6 ft 1 in)	80 kg (176 lb)	R	40	(Italy) NC Milano
9	Hristina Ilić	W	30 January 2002 (age 24)	1.68 m (5 ft 6 in)	62 kg (137 lb)	R	30	(Serbia) VK Crvena zvezda
10	Jelena Vuković	FP	8 February 1994 (age 32)	1.77 m (5 ft 10 in)	79 kg (174 lb)	R	20	(Italy) NC Milano
11	Ana Milićević	W	13 September 2003 (age 22)	1.68 m (5 ft 6 in)	60 kg (132 lb)	R	2	(Serbia) VK Palilula
12	Tijana Jakovljević (C)	AR	28 July 1991 (age 35)	1.77 m (5 ft 10 in)	75 kg (165 lb)	R	42	(Serbia) VK Crvena zvezda
13	Nikolina Travar	GK	2 January 2001 (age 25)	1.76 m (5 ft 9 in)	70 kg (154 lb)	R	40	(Serbia) VK Vojvodina

== Under-20 team ==
Serbia lastly competed at the 2021 FINA Junior Water Polo World Championships.
