= Germany women's national water polo team =

Women's national water polo team representing Germany

Germany
- FINA code: GER
- Association: German Swimming Federation
- Confederation: LEN (Europe)
- Head coach: Sven Schulz
- Asst coach: Georgios Triantafyllou
- Captain: Gesa Deike

FINA ranking (since 2008)
- Current: 17 (as of 9 August 2021)

World Championship
- Appearances: 7 (first in 1986)
- Best result: 6th place

World League
- Appearances: 1 (first in 2012)
- Best result: 6th place (2012)

European Championship
- Appearances: 19 (first in 1985)
- Best result: (bronze) (1985)

Media
- Website: dsv.de/wasserball

The Germany women's national water polo team represents Germany in international women's water polo competitions and friendly matches.

== Results ==
All results before 1990 are for the West German team.

=== World Championship ===
- 1986 – 6th place
- 1991 – 6th place
- 1994 – 8th place
- 2003 – 10th place
- 2005 – 8th place
- 2007 – 11th place
- 2009 – 10th place

=== World League ===
- 2012 – 6th place

=== European Championship ===
- 1985 – (bronze) Bronze medal
- 1987 – 4th place
- 1989 – 5th place
- 1991 – 6th place
- 1993 – 6th place
- 1995 – 7th place
- 1997 – 6th place
- 1999 – 7th place
- 2001 – 7th place
- 2003 – 7th place
- 2006 – 7th place
- 2008 – 7th place
- 2010 – 7th place
- 2012 – 8th place
- 2016 – 8th place
- 2018 – 8th place
- 2020 – 11th place
- 2022 – 10th place
- 2024 – 11th place
- 2026 – 11th place

== Current squad ==
Roster for the 2020 Women's European Water Polo Championship.

Head coach: Arno Troost

No	Name	Pos.	Date of birth	Height	Weight	L/R	Caps	Club
1	Felicitas Saurusajtis	GK	23 January 1995 (age 31)	1.73 m (5 ft 8 in)	63 kg (139 lb)	R	27	(Germany) Blau-Weiß Bochum
2	Belen Vosseberg	W	15 December 1997 (age 28)	1.66 m (5 ft 5 in)	60 kg (132 lb)	L	55	(Germany) Wasserfreunde Spandau 04
3	Maren Hinz	DF	6 November 1997 (age 28)	1.83 m (6 ft 0 in)	80 kg (176 lb)	R	20	(Germany) Eimsbütteler TV
4	Sophia Eggert	CF	5 March 1999 (age 26)	1.70 m (5 ft 7 in)	72 kg (159 lb)	R	9	(Germany) Bayer Uerdingen
5	Gesa Deike (C)	W	26 June 1995 (age 30)	1.70 m (5 ft 7 in)	62 kg (137 lb)	R	52	(Germany) Bayer Uerdingen
6	Ira Deike	W	30 April 1998 (age 27)	1.65 m (5 ft 5 in)	55 kg (121 lb)	R	20	(Germany) Bayer Uerdingen
7	Nicole Vunder	W	18 April 2002 (age 23)	1.68 m (5 ft 6 in)	70 kg (154 lb)	R	10	(Germany) Wasserfreunde Spandau 04
8	Aylin Fry	W	1 December 1999 (age 26)	1.63 m (5 ft 4 in)	62 kg (137 lb)	R	40	(Germany) Bayer Uerdingen
9	Jennifer Stiefel	W	13 July 1992 (age 33)	1.66 m (5 ft 5 in)	60 kg (132 lb)	R	57	(Germany) Wasserfreunde Spandau 04
10	Fabienne Heerdt	W	6 May 1997 (age 28)	1.74 m (5 ft 9 in)	66 kg (146 lb)	R	2	(Germany) SV Nikar Heidelberg
11	Pauline Pannasch	AR	16 June 1999 (age 26)	1.73 m (5 ft 8 in)	67 kg (148 lb)	L	2	(Germany) Eimsbütteler TV
12	Lynn Krukenberg	CF	14 June 1998 (age 27)	1.86 m (6 ft 1 in)	80 kg (176 lb)	R	15	(Germany) Wasserfreunde Spandau 04
13	Ronja Kerßenboom	GK	17 October 1996 (age 29)	1.70 m (5 ft 7 in)	67 kg (148 lb)	R	20	(Germany) Bayer Uerdingen

== Under-20 team ==
Germany lastly competed at the 2021 FINA Junior Water Polo World Championships.
