= 2026 Women's European U-20 Water Polo Championship =

Water polo tournament held in Oeiras, Portugal

Tournament details
- Host country: Portugal
- City: Oeiras
- Venue: 1 (in 1 host city)
- Dates: 1–7 August 2026
- Teams: 20 (from 1 confederation)

Final positions
- Champions: Hungary (2nd title)
- Runners-up: Spain
- Third place: Netherlands
- Fourth place: Italy

Official website
- events.europeanaquatics.org

The 2026 Women's European U-20 Water Polo Championship was the 16th edition of the Women's European U-20 Water Polo Championship, organized by Europe's governing aquatics body, European Aquatics. The tournament was played in Oeiras, Portugal, from 1 to 7 August 2026. Starting this edition, the age level has changed from U19 to U20.

Portugal was given the hosting rights, with Oeiras as the host venue. This was the third time the country hosted the event, after 2002 and 2018.

20 teams participated in the tournament, four more than the previous edition. Hungary secured their second overall title with a penalty shootout victory over Spain in the final, 13(8)–13(7).

== Participating teams ==
Twenty teams took part. Czech Republic, Ireland, Portugal, Serbia and Switzerland returned, while Bulgaria and Slovakia were the only teams to not enter after taking part in 2024.

Russia was allowed to enter after their ban was lifted. In official statistics, the Russian team was listed as "Neutral Athletes B".

| Event | Date | Location | Quotas | Nations |
|---|---|---|---|---|
| Participated in the 2024 European Championship | 24–31 August 2024 | (Croatia) Zagreb | 14 | Spain; Hungary; Greece; Croatia; Italy; Netherlands; Israel; France; Great Britain; Germany; Ukraine; Turkey; Romania; Malta |
| Didn't participate in 2024 | —N/a | —N/a | 6 | Serbia; Czech Republic; Switzerland; Portugal; Ireland; Russia |

== Format ==
The 20 teams were sorted into two divisions. The top eight teams made Division 1 and the other 12 Division 2. Division 1 was split into two groups of four teams while Division 2 was split into four groups of three teams. The top two teams from each group of Division 1 advanced directly to the quarterfinals, while the bottom two teams from each group played against Division 2 group winners in the crossover round. Starting with quarterfinals onward, the regular knock-out system with consolation playoffs and final classification matches was used.

== Draw ==
The draw took place on 16 February 2026. The seeding was based off the results of the 2024 European Championship and Women's national team rankings.

== Preliminary round ==
=== Division 1 ===
==== Group A ====
| Pos | Team | Pld | W | PSW | PSL | L | GF | GA | GD | Pts | Qualification |
|---|---|---|---|---|---|---|---|---|---|---|---|
| 1 | Spain | 3 | 3 | 0 | 0 | 0 | 59 | 31 | 28 | 9 | Quarterfinals |
| 2 | Italy | 3 | 2 | 0 | 0 | 1 | 39 | 41 | −2 | 6 | Quarterfinals |
| 3 | Greece | 3 | 1 | 0 | 0 | 2 | 44 | 44 | 0 | 3 | Crossovers |
| 4 | Israel | 3 | 0 | 0 | 0 | 3 | 35 | 61 | −26 | 0 | Crossovers |

Source: events.europeanaquatics.org
Rules for classification: 1) points; 2) head-to-head points; 3) head-to-head goal difference; 4) head-to-head number of goals scored; 5) Goal difference.

==== Group B ====
| Pos | Team | Pld | W | PSW | PSL | L | GF | GA | GD | Pts | Qualification |
|---|---|---|---|---|---|---|---|---|---|---|---|
| 1 | Hungary | 3 | 3 | 0 | 0 | 0 | 62 | 18 | 44 | 9 | Quarterfinals |
| 2 | Netherlands | 3 | 2 | 0 | 0 | 1 | 52 | 32 | 20 | 6 | Quarterfinals |
| 3 | Croatia | 3 | 1 | 0 | 0 | 2 | 36 | 48 | −12 | 3 | Crossovers |
| 4 | France | 3 | 0 | 0 | 0 | 3 | 22 | 74 | −52 | 0 | Crossovers |

Source: events.europeanaquatics.org
Rules for classification: 1) points; 2) head-to-head points; 3) head-to-head goal difference; 4) head-to-head number of goals scored; 5) Goal difference.

=== Division 2 ===
==== Group C ====
| Pos | Team | Pld | W | PSW | PSL | L | GF | GA | GD | Pts | Qualification |
|---|---|---|---|---|---|---|---|---|---|---|---|
| 1 | Russia | 2 | 2 | 0 | 0 | 0 | 58 | 10 | 48 | 6 | Crossovers |
| 2 | Germany | 2 | 1 | 0 | 0 | 1 | 19 | 31 | −12 | 3 | 13th–16th place classification |
| 3 | Malta | 2 | 0 | 0 | 0 | 2 | 12 | 48 | −36 | 0 | 17th–20th place classification |

Source: events.europeanaquatics.org

==== Group D ====
| Pos | Team | Pld | W | PSW | PSL | L | GF | GA | GD | Pts | Qualification |
|---|---|---|---|---|---|---|---|---|---|---|---|
| 1 | Portugal (H) | 2 | 1 | 1 | 0 | 0 | 24 | 20 | 4 | 5 | Crossovers |
| 2 | Ukraine | 2 | 1 | 0 | 0 | 1 | 23 | 25 | −2 | 3 | 13th–16th place classification |
| 3 | Romania | 2 | 0 | 0 | 1 | 1 | 17 | 19 | −2 | 1 | 17th–20th place classification |

Source: events.europeanaquatics.org
(H) Hosts

==== Group E ====
| Pos | Team | Pld | W | PSW | PSL | L | GF | GA | GD | Pts | Qualification |
|---|---|---|---|---|---|---|---|---|---|---|---|
| 1 | Great Britain | 2 | 2 | 0 | 0 | 0 | 42 | 21 | 21 | 6 | Crossovers |
| 2 | Czech Republic | 2 | 1 | 0 | 0 | 1 | 24 | 30 | −6 | 3 | 13th–16th place classification |
| 3 | Ireland | 2 | 0 | 0 | 0 | 2 | 18 | 33 | −15 | 0 | 17th–20th place classification |

Source: events.europeanaquatics.org

==== Group F ====
| Pos | Team | Pld | W | PSW | PSL | L | GF | GA | GD | Pts | Qualification |
|---|---|---|---|---|---|---|---|---|---|---|---|
| 1 | Serbia | 2 | 2 | 0 | 0 | 0 | 28 | 15 | 13 | 6 | Crossovers |
| 2 | Turkey | 2 | 1 | 0 | 0 | 1 | 31 | 18 | 13 | 3 | 13th–16th place classification |
| 3 | Switzerland | 2 | 0 | 0 | 0 | 2 | 12 | 38 | −26 | 0 | 17th–20th place classification |

Source: events.europeanaquatics.org

== 13th–16th place classification ==
| Pos | Team | Pld | W | PSW | PSL | L | GF | GA | GD | Pts |
|---|---|---|---|---|---|---|---|---|---|---|
| 13 | Germany | 3 | 3 | 0 | 0 | 0 | 46 | 26 | 20 | 9 |
| 14 | Turkey | 3 | 2 | 0 | 0 | 1 | 57 | 36 | 21 | 6 |
| 15 | Ukraine | 3 | 1 | 0 | 0 | 2 | 29 | 52 | −23 | 3 |
| 16 | Czech Republic | 3 | 0 | 0 | 0 | 3 | 31 | 49 | −18 | 0 |

Source: events.europeanaquatics.org
Rules for classification: 1) points; 2) head-to-head points; 3) head-to-head goal difference; 4) head-to-head number of goals scored; 5) Goal difference.

== 17th–20th place classification ==
| Pos | Team | Pld | W | PSW | PSL | L | GF | GA | GD | Pts |
|---|---|---|---|---|---|---|---|---|---|---|
| 17 | Malta | 3 | 3 | 0 | 0 | 0 | 41 | 20 | 21 | 9 |
| 18 | Switzerland | 3 | 2 | 0 | 0 | 1 | 28 | 32 | −4 | 6 |
| 19 | Ireland | 3 | 1 | 0 | 0 | 2 | 24 | 30 | −6 | 3 |
| 20 | Romania | 3 | 0 | 0 | 0 | 3 | 28 | 39 | −11 | 0 |

Source: events.europeanaquatics.org
Rules for classification: 1) points; 2) head-to-head points; 3) head-to-head goal difference; 4) head-to-head number of goals scored; 5) Goal difference.

== Championship playoffs ==
Crossovers
A4 | Israel | 8
C1 | Russia | 22
B3 | Croatia | 22
F1 | Serbia | 8
A3 | Greece | 27
D1 | Portugal | 8
B4 | France | 12
E1 | Great Britain | 13

Quarterfinals
B1 | Hungary | 15
CO1 | Russia | 11
A2 | Italy | 17
CO2 | Croatia | 12
B2 | Netherlands | 13
CO3 | Greece | 10
A1 | Spain | 26
CO4 | Great Britain | 7

Semifinals
Hungary | 10
Italy | 8
Netherlands | 8
Spain | 15

Final
Hungary | 13 (8)
Spain | 13 (7)
3rd place match
Italy | 7
Netherlands | 11

== 5th–8th place playoffs ==
5th–8th place semifinals
Russia | 20
Croatia | 7
Greece | 19
Great Britain | 13

5th place match
Russia | 14
Greece | 9
7th place match
Croatia | 23
Great Britain | 14

== 9th–12th place playoffs ==
9th–12th place semifinals
Israel | 19
France | 9
Portugal | 3
Serbia | 18

9th place match
Israel | 16
Serbia | 7
11th place match
France | 27
Portugal | 5

== Final standings ==
| Rank | Team |
|---|---|
| 1st place, gold medalist(s) | Hungary |
| 2nd place, silver medalist(s) | Spain |
| 3rd place, bronze medalist(s) | Netherlands |
| 4 | Italy |
| 5 | Russia |
| 6 | Greece |
| 7 | Croatia |
| 8 | Great Britain |
| 9 | Israel |
| 10 | Serbia |
| 11 | France |
| 12 | Portugal |
| 13 | Germany |
| 14 | Turkey |
| 15 | Ukraine |
| 16 | Czech Republic |
| 17 | Malta |
| 18 | Switzerland |
| 19 | Ireland |
| 20 | Romania |
