= Dorothee Stapelfeldt =

German politician

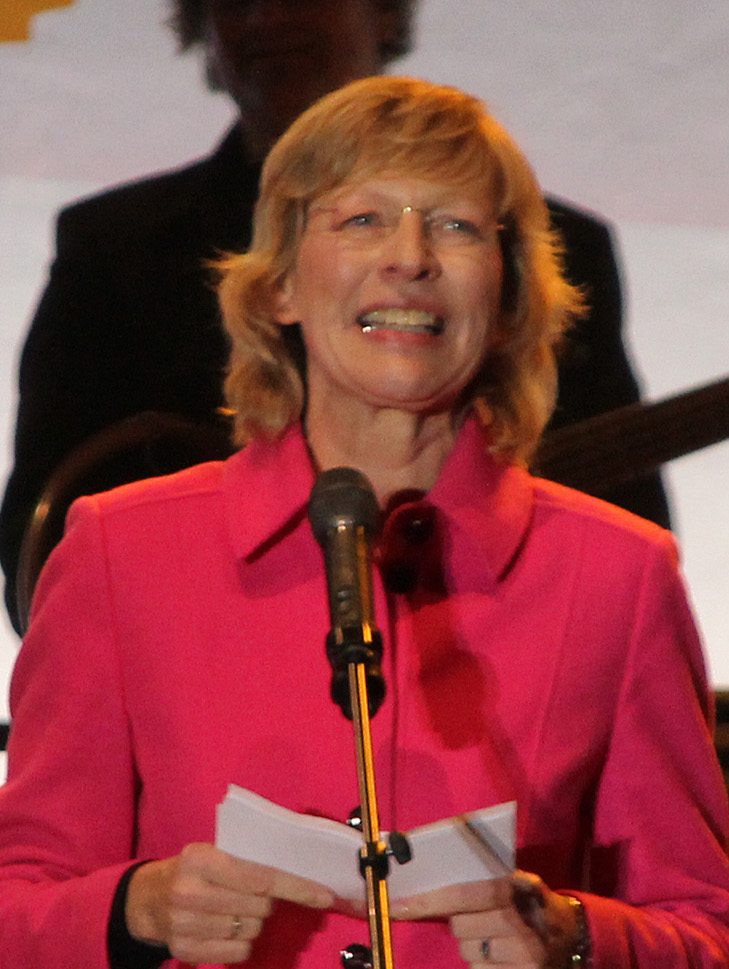
- Stapelfeld at the Federal Horticultural Show 2011

Senator for Urban Development and Environment of Hamburg
- In office 15 April 2015 – 2022
- First Mayor: Olaf Scholz; Katharina Fegebank (Acting); Peter Tschentscher
- Preceded by: Jutta Blankau

122nd Second Mayor of Hamburg
- In office 7 March 2011 – 15 April 2015
- First Mayor: Olaf Scholz
- Preceded by: Dietrich Wersich
- Succeeded by: Katharina Fegebank

Senator for Science and Research of Hamburg
- In office 7 March 2011 – 15 April 2015
- First Mayor: Olaf Scholz
- Preceded by: Herlind Gundelach
- Succeeded by: Katharina Fegebank

President of the Hamburg Parliament
- In office 7 March 2011 – 23 March 2011
- Preceded by: Lutz Mohaupt
- Succeeded by: Carola Veit
- In office 5 April 2000 – 17 March 2004
- Preceded by: Ute Pape
- Succeeded by: Berndt Röder

Personal details
- Born: 12 August 1956 (age 70) Hamburg, West Germany (now Germany)
- Party: Social Democratic Party (SPD)
- Education: University of Hamburg

Dorothee Stapelfeldt (born 12 August 1956) is a German politician of the Social Democratic Party of Germany (SPD) who served in the governments of mayors Olaf Scholz and Peter Tschentscher of Hamburg, including as State Minister for Urban Development and Environment (2015–2022) and State Minister of Science and Research (2011–2015).

== Early life and education ==
Stapelfeldt was born in 1956 in Hamburg. She took her school exam in 1975, and studied history of art, literary criticism, and social and economic history at the University of Hamburg. In 1989 she earned a doctorate.

== Political career ==
=== Early beginnings ===
Stapelfeldt is a member of the (SPD). She has been a member of the Hamburg State Parliament since 1986, from 2000 to 2004 as its President. In 2007 she was in competition with Mathias Petersen for the position of top candidate for the Hamburg state election, but resigned after friction during an internal SPD election.

=== Career in state government ===
Between 2011 and 2015, Stapelfeldt served as Deputy Mayor of Hamburg as well as State Minister (Senator) for Science and Research in the state government of Mayor Olaf Scholz. In this capacity, she was one of the state's representatives at the Bundesrat. From 2015 to 2022, she served as State Minister for Urban Development and Housing.

In the negotiations to form a so-called traffic light coalition of the SPD, the Green Party and the FDP under Chancellor Olaf Scholz following the 2021 federal elections, Stapelfeldt was part of her party's delegation in the working group on building and housing, chaired by Kevin Kühnert, Christian Kühn and Daniel Föst.

== Other activities ==
=== Corporate boards ===
- Hamburg Marketing Gesellschaft mbH (HMG GmbH), Ex-Officio Member of the Supervisory Board

=== Non-profit organizations ===
- Übersee Club, Member of the Board of Trustees
- German United Services Trade Union (ver.di), Member
- German Federation for the Environment and Nature Conservation (BUND), Member
- Rotary International, Member
- Hamburg Media School (HMS), Member of the Supervisory Board (2011-2015)

== Personal life ==
Stapelfeldt is married, but living separated and has two children. She lives in Hamburg's Winterhude district.

Preceded by Ute Pape	President of the Hamburg Parliament; 2000–2004	Succeeded by Berndt Röder
