= 2026 Men's European U-20 Water Polo Championship Division I =

Water polo tournament held in Oeiras, Bulgaria

Tournament details
- Host country: Portugal
- City: Oeiras
- Venue: 1 (in 1 host city)
- Dates: 10–16 August 2026
- Teams: 12 (from 1 confederation)

Final positions
- Champions: Russia (1st title)
- Runners-up: Israel
- Third place: Poland

Official website
- events.europeanaquatics.org

The 2026 Men's European U-20 Water Polo Championship Division I was the inaugural edition of the second tier of the Men's European U-20 Water Polo Championship, organized by Europe's governing aquatics body, European Aquatics. The tournament was played in Oeiras, Portugal, from 10 to 16 August 2026. Starting this edition, the age level has changed from U19 to U20.

Oeiras in Portugal was given the hosting rights.

12 teams participated in the tournament. For the first time, a promotion and relegation system was used for the competition. Russia secured the title with a victory over Israel in the final, 13–9. Both these teams promoted to the 2028 Men's European U-20 Water Polo Championship Elite Division.

== Format ==
The 12 teams were drawn into two groups of six teams. The top two teams from each group advanced to the semifinals; the third- and fourth-placed teams advanced to the 5th–8th place playoffs; the other teams were dropped to the 9th–12th place playoffs. In each of these playoff sections, two semifinal matches and two final placement matches were played.

== Participating teams ==
No qualification round took place; the 16 teams that took part in the 2024 championship automatically qualified for the Elite Division, while the remaining registered teams competed in this newly formed Division I.

Belarus and Russia returned to competition after their ban was lifted. In official statistics, the Belarussian team was listed as "Neutral Athletes A" and the Russian team as "Neutral Athletes B".

== Draw ==
The draw took place on 16 February 2026 at the European Aquatics Water Polo Office in Zagreb, Croatia.

== Group stage ==
=== Group A ===
Pos	Team	Pld	W	PSW	PSL	L	GF	GA	GD	Pts	Qualification
1	Israel	5	4	1	0	0	65	45	20	14	Semifinals
2	Belgium	5	3	0	1	1	69	55	14	10	Semifinals
3	Ukraine	5	2	0	0	3	57	50	7	6	5th–8th place playoffs
4	Belarus	5	2	0	0	3	57	74	−17	6	5th–8th place playoffs
5	Great Britain	5	2	0	0	3	52	58	−6	6	9th–12th place playoffs
6	Switzerland	5	1	0	0	4	54	72	−18	3	9th–12th place playoffs

Source: events.europeanaquatics.org
Rules for classification: 1) points; 2) head-to-head points; 3) head-to-head goal difference; 4) head-to-head number of goals scored; 5) Goal difference.

=== Group B ===
Pos	Team	Pld	W	PSW	PSL	L	GF	GA	GD	Pts	Qualification
1	Russia	5	5	0	0	0	129	27	102	15	Semifinals
2	Poland	5	4	0	0	1	75	60	15	12	Semifinals
3	Georgia	5	3	0	0	2	72	57	15	9	5th–8th place playoffs
4	Portugal	5	2	0	0	3	52	79	−27	6	5th–8th place playoffs
5	Lithuania	5	1	0	0	4	38	79	−41	3	9th–12th place playoffs
6	Finland	5	0	0	0	5	30	94	−64	0	9th–12th place playoffs

Source: events.europeanaquatics.org
Rules for classification: 1) points; 2) head-to-head points; 3) head-to-head goal difference; 4) head-to-head number of goals scored; 5) Goal difference.

== 9th–12th place playoffs ==
9th–12th place semifinals
A6	Switzerland	17
B5	Lithuania	15
A5	Great Britain	17
B6	Finland	6

9th place match
Switzerland	9
Great Britain	11
11th place match
Lithuania	29
Finland	11

== 5th–8th place playoffs ==
5th–8th place semifinals
A4	Belarus	7
B3	Georgia	17
A3	Ukraine	11
B4	Portugal	10

5th place match
Georgia	13
Ukraine	12
7th place match
Belarus	15
Portugal	16

== Championship playoffs ==
Semifinals
A1	Israel	15
B2	Poland	13
B1	Russia	22
A2	Belgium	11

Final
Israel	9
Russia	13
3rd place match
Poland	17
Belgium	15

== Final standings ==
Rank	Team
1st place, gold medalist(s)	Russia
2nd place, silver medalist(s)	Israel
3rd place, bronze medalist(s)	Poland
4	Belgium
5	Georgia
6	Ukraine
7	Portugal
8	Belarus
9	Great Britain
10	Switzerland
11	Lithuania
12	Finland

Promoted to the 2028 Men's European U-20 Water Polo Championship Elite Division
