= 2026 Men's European U-20 Water Polo Championship =

Water polo tournament held in Varna, Bulgaria

Tournament details
- Host country: Bulgaria
- City: Varna
- Venue: 1 (in 1 host city)
- Dates: 10–16 August 2026
- Teams: 16 (from 1 confederation)

Final positions
- Champions: Croatia (2nd title)
- Runners-up: Spain
- Third place: Italy
- Fourth place: Montenegro

Official website
- events.europeanaquatics.org

The 2026 Men's European U-20 Water Polo Championship was the 29th edition of the Men's European U-20 Water Polo Championship, organized by Europe's governing aquatics body, European Aquatics. The tournament was played in Varna, Bulgaria, from 10 to 16 August 2026. Starting this edition, the age level has changed from U19 to U20.

The event was supposed to be hosted by Portuguese city of Coimbra, but instead, for the second consecutive time, Bulgaria was given the hosting rights. This was the fourth time the country hosted the event, after 1982, 1990 and 2024. The host city was Varna, which hosted the event for the third time.

16 teams participated in the tournament, with the rankings from the previous edition deciding who qualified. For the first time, a promotion and relegation system was used for the competition. Croatia successfully defended their title with a victory over Spain in the final, 17–14.

== Format ==
The 16 teams were sorted into two sub-divisions, based on the last edition. The top eight teams made Sub-division 1 and the other eight teams Sub-division 2. Both sub-divisions were split into two groups of four teams. The top two teams from each group of Sub-division 1 advanced directly to the quarterfinals, while the bottom two teams from each group of Sub-division 1 advanced to the crossovers, where they played against the top two teams from each group of Sub-division 2. Starting with quarterfinals onward, the regular knock-out system was used.

== Participating teams ==
No qualification round took place; the sixteen teams that took part in the 2024 edition automatically qualified for the championship, while the remaining registered teams competed in the newly formed Division I.

Teams
Croatia (1st)
Montenegro (2nd)
Spain (3rd)
Hungary (4th)
Germany (5th)
Italy (6th)
Serbia (7th)
Greece (8th)
Netherlands (9th)
Turkey (10th)
Romania (11th)
Bulgaria (12th)
France (13th)
Malta (14th)
Czech Republic (15th)
Slovenia (16th)

== Draw ==
The draw took place on 16 February 2026 at the European Aquatics Water Polo Office in Zagreb, Croatia. The seeding was based off the results of the 2024 European Championship.

== Venue ==
Varna was the host city, with the Yulian Rusev Pool in the Primorski Swimming Complex being the venue. The venue was being renovated and was finished by May 2026. The costs of the renovations were 481,000 Euros.

== Preliminary round ==
All times are local (Eastern European Summer Time; UTC+3).

=== Sub-division 1 ===
==== Group A ====
| Pos | Team | Pld | W | PSW | PSL | L | GF | GA | GD | Pts | Qualification |
|---|---|---|---|---|---|---|---|---|---|---|---|
| 1 | Italy | 3 | 3 | 0 | 0 | 0 | 46 | 40 | 6 | 9 | Quarterfinals |
| 2 | Greece | 3 | 1 | 0 | 1 | 1 | 41 | 41 | 0 | 4 | Quarterfinals |
| 3 | Croatia | 3 | 1 | 0 | 0 | 2 | 41 | 45 | −4 | 3 | Crossovers |
| 4 | Hungary | 3 | 0 | 1 | 0 | 2 | 45 | 47 | −2 | 2 | Crossovers |

Source: events.europeanaquatics.org
Rules for classification: 1) points; 2) head-to-head points; 3) head-to-head goal difference; 4) head-to-head number of goals scored; 5) Goal difference.

==== Group B ====
| Pos | Team | Pld | W | PSW | PSL | L | GF | GA | GD | Pts | Qualification |
|---|---|---|---|---|---|---|---|---|---|---|---|
| 1 | Spain | 3 | 2 | 1 | 0 | 0 | 45 | 36 | 9 | 8 | Quarterfinals |
| 2 | Serbia | 3 | 1 | 1 | 1 | 0 | 48 | 39 | 9 | 6 | Quarterfinals |
| 3 | Montenegro | 3 | 1 | 0 | 1 | 1 | 43 | 41 | 2 | 4 | Crossovers |
| 4 | Germany | 3 | 0 | 0 | 0 | 3 | 37 | 57 | −20 | 0 | Crossovers |

Source: events.europeanaquatics.org
Rules for classification: 1) points; 2) head-to-head points; 3) head-to-head goal difference; 4) head-to-head number of goals scored; 5) Goal difference.

=== Sub-division 2 ===
==== Group C ====
| Pos | Team | Pld | W | PSW | PSL | L | GF | GA | GD | Pts | Qualification |
|---|---|---|---|---|---|---|---|---|---|---|---|
| 1 | Turkey | 3 | 3 | 0 | 0 | 0 | 61 | 22 | 39 | 9 | Crossovers |
| 2 | France | 3 | 2 | 0 | 0 | 1 | 42 | 39 | 3 | 6 | Crossovers |
| 3 | Bulgaria (H) | 3 | 1 | 0 | 0 | 2 | 34 | 44 | −10 | 3 | 13th–16th place playoffs |
| 4 | Slovenia | 3 | 0 | 0 | 0 | 3 | 32 | 64 | −32 | 0 | 13th–16th place playoffs |

Source: events.europeanaquatics.org
Rules for classification: 1) points; 2) head-to-head points; 3) head-to-head goal difference; 4) head-to-head number of goals scored; 5) Goal difference.
(H) Hosts

==== Group D ====
| Pos | Team | Pld | W | PSW | PSL | L | GF | GA | GD | Pts | Qualification |
|---|---|---|---|---|---|---|---|---|---|---|---|
| 1 | Netherlands | 3 | 3 | 0 | 0 | 0 | 55 | 25 | 30 | 9 | Crossovers |
| 2 | Malta | 3 | 2 | 0 | 0 | 1 | 44 | 36 | 8 | 6 | Crossovers |
| 3 | Romania | 3 | 1 | 0 | 0 | 2 | 40 | 37 | 3 | 3 | 13th–16th place playoffs |
| 4 | Czech Republic | 3 | 0 | 0 | 0 | 3 | 19 | 60 | −41 | 0 | 13th–16th place playoffs |

Source: events.europeanaquatics.org
Rules for classification: 1) points; 2) head-to-head points; 3) head-to-head goal difference; 4) head-to-head number of goals scored; 5) Goal difference.

== Championship playoffs ==
Crossovers
A4 | Hungary | 21
C1 | Turkey | 10
B3 | Montenegro | 17
D2 | Malta | 15
A3 | Croatia | 21
C2 | France | 8
B4 | Germany | 16
D1 | Netherlands | 15

Quarterfinals
B1 | Spain | 13
CO1 | Hungary | 7
A2 | Greece | 29
CO2 | Montenegro | 30
B2 | Serbia | 13
CO3 | Croatia | 14
A1 | Italy | 16
CO4 | Germany | 10

Semifinals
Spain | 15
Montenegro | 10
Croatia | 19
Italy | 11

Final
Spain | 14
Croatia | 17
3rd place match
Montenegro | 13
Italy | 15

== 5th–8th place playoffs ==
5th–8th place semifinals
Hungary | 17
Greece | 10
Serbia | 20
Germany | 15

5th place match
Hungary | 20
Serbia | 19
7th place match
Greece | 19
Germany | 16

== 9th–12th place playoffs ==
9th–12th place semifinals
Turkey | 18
Malta | 19
France | 9
Netherlands | 19

9th place match
Malta | 15
Netherlands | 12
11th place match
Turkey | 9
France | 18

== 13th–16th place playoffs ==
13th–16th place semifinals
D3 | Romania | 17
C4 | Slovenia | 10
D4 | Czech Republic | 13
C3 | Bulgaria | 14

13th place match
Romania | 15
Bulgaria | 11
15th place match
Slovenia | 17
Czech Republic | 13

== Final standings ==
| Rank | Team |
|---|---|
| 1st place, gold medalist(s) | Croatia |
| 2nd place, silver medalist(s) | Spain |
| 3rd place, bronze medalist(s) | Italy |
| 4 | Montenegro |
| 5 | Hungary |
| 6 | Serbia |
| 7 | Greece |
| 8 | Germany |
| 9 | Malta |
| 10 | Netherlands |
| 11 | France |
| 12 | Turkey |
| 13 | Romania |
| 14 | Bulgaria |
| 15 | Slovenia |
| 16 | Czech Republic |

| Relegated to the 2028 Men's European U-20 Water Polo Championship Division I |
