= President of the Hamburg Parliament =

- Präsident der Hamburgischen Bürgerschaft
- Large coat of arms of the Free and Hanseatic City of Hamburg

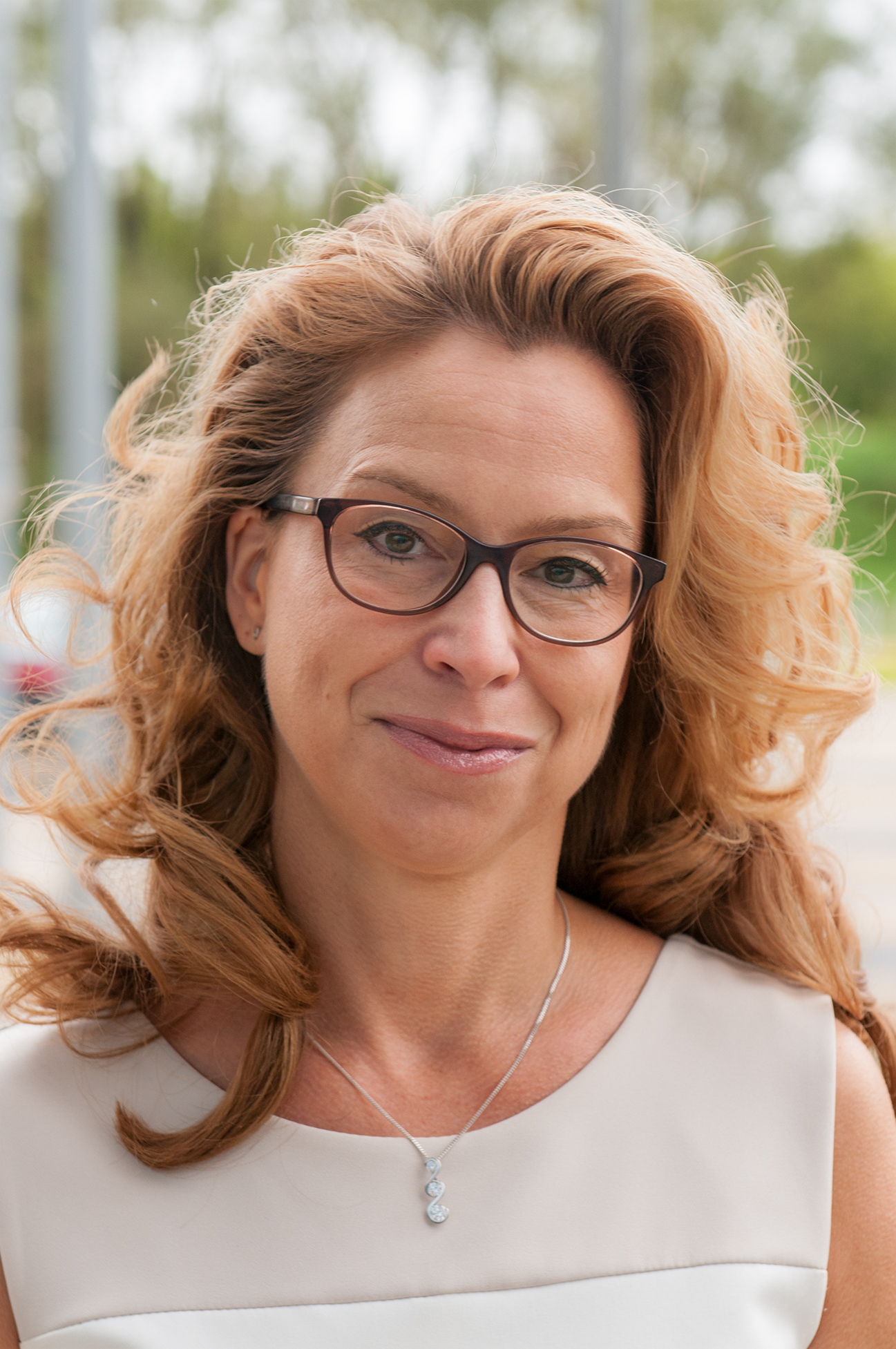
- Incumbent; Carola Veit since 23 March 2011
- Style: His/Her President
- Residence: Hamburger Rathaus (Hamburg)
- Appointer: Hamburg Parliament
- Term length: Five years
- Constituting instrument: Constitution of Hamburg
- Formation: 6 December 1859
- First holder: Johannes Versmann
- Website: English version of the website of the Hamburg Parliament: www.hamburgische-buergerschaft.com

The President of the Hamburg Parliament (German: Präsident der Hamburgischen Bürgerschaft) presides over the sessions of the Bürgerschaft, the parliament of Hamburg, with functions similar to that of a speaker in other countries. In the Hamburg order of precedence, the office is ranked first before the first Mayor.

== History ==
The office of the President of the Hamburg Parliament exists since December 6, 1859. It was constitutionally established on September 28, 1860. Johannes Versmann was the first President of the Hamburg Parliament.

Herbert Dau held the office of president the longest period from 1960 to 1978.

The current President of the Bürgerschaft since 2011 is Carola Veit.

== Election and Customs ==
The President of the Hamburg Parliament is elected during the constituent session of each election period after the election by all members of the Bürgerschaft. The president has to be a member. Until the election of the president, the session is chaired by the Father of the House, the so-called "Alterspräsident", the oldest member of the Bürgerschaft.

Usually, the President of the Bürgerschaft is a member of the largest parliamentary group.

== Responsibilities ==
The President is the representative of Parliament and is elected for the duration of an electoral term.

The President’s responsibilities include presiding over the sittings of Parliament. Acting impartially, The President takes care that the rules of procedure are observed and upholds appropriate behavior in the house. The President must conduct sittings of Parliament fairly and impartially. During a sitting, it is the President's job to maintain order in the debating chamber and make sure the rules are observed.

The President's work is supported by the Bürgerschaft Chancellery, which has about 120 staff. The President exercises authority in the rooms used by the Parliament. The President has the task of safeguarding the rights of Parliament and its Members and preserving the dignity of the Bürgerschaft.

As Parliament’s representative, the President attends important events and speaks on behalf of the Bürgerschaft. The Vice Presidents deputies for her, sharing the task of presiding over Parliament.
