= Lünen =

- Town
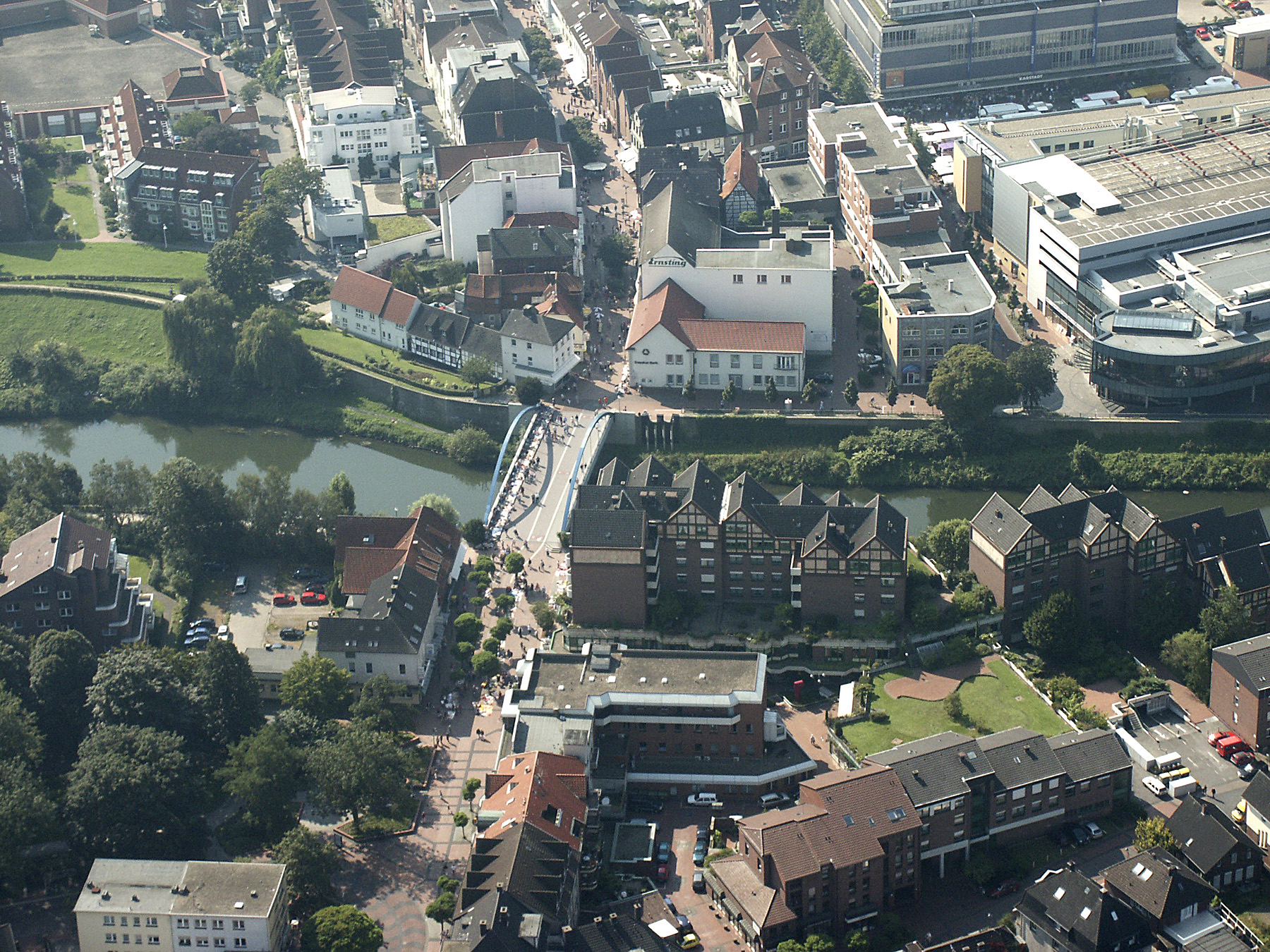
- View with the bridge on the River Lippe

- Coat of arms

- Location of Lünen within Unna district
- Interactive map of Lünen
- Location within Germany Location within North Rhine-Westphalia
- Coordinates: 51°37′N 7°31′E
- Country: Germany
- State: North Rhine-Westphalia
- Admin. region: Arnsberg
- District: Unna
- Subdivisions: 14 Stadtteile

Government
  - Mayor (2025–30): Martina Förster-Teutenberg (SPD)

Area
  - Total: 59.39 km^{2} (22.93 sq mi)
- Elevation: 58 m (190 ft)

Population (2025-12-31)
  - Total: 85,844
  - Density: 1,445/km^{2} (3,744/sq mi)
- Time zone: UTC+01:00 (CET)
  - Summer (DST): UTC+02:00 (CEST)
- Postal codes: 44532, 44534, 44536
- Dialling codes: 02306, 0231
- Vehicle registration: UN, LÜN
- Website: www.luenen.de

Lünen (German pronunciation: [ˈlyːnən]) is a town with around 86000 inhabitants in North Rhine-Westphalia, Germany. It is located north of Dortmund, on both banks of the River Lippe. It is the largest town of the Unna district and part of the Ruhr Area.

In 2009, a biogas plant was built to provide electric power to the city. Lünen is the first city in the world to receive electricity via public utility companies that is generated on the basis of animal waste. The plant produces up to 6.6 MW, supplying 26000 homes with heat and electricity.

== Culture and main sights ==
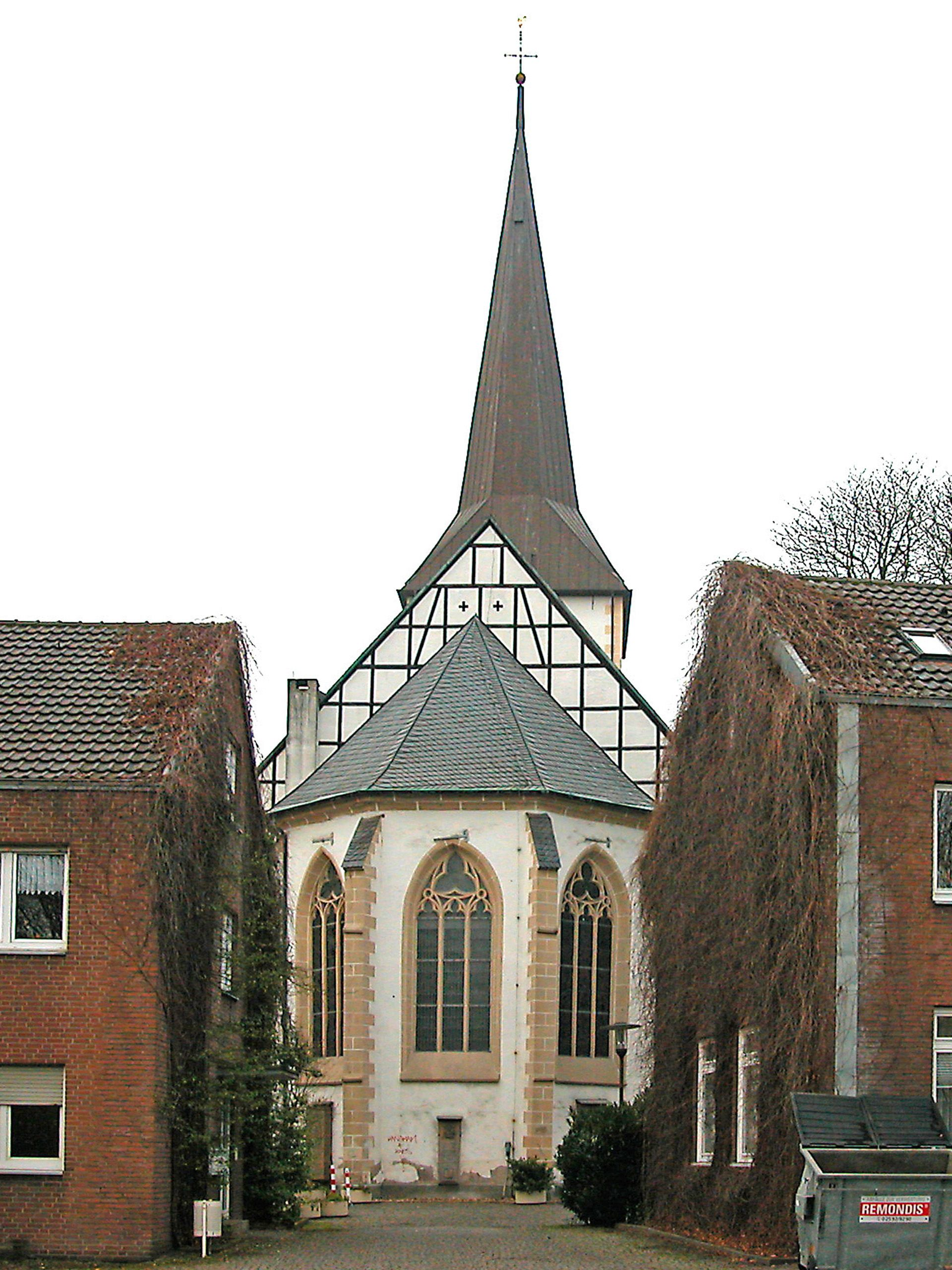
Saint George's Church

Structure

- Saint George's Church
- Saint Mary's Church
- Chateau of Schwansbell
- Colani-UFO
- Freiherr-vom-Stein School
- Town hall of Lünen
- Geschwister-Scholl School
- Industrial Monument "Moor Crane"
- Schloß Buddenburg Gedenkstätte

Museum

- Museum of the town Lünen
- Mining Museum in Lünen South
- Mining residential Museum in Lünen Brambauer

Theatre

- Heinz-Hilpert theater

== Population ==
Historical population

Year	Pop.	±% p.a.
1965	86,944	—
1970	86,778	−0.04%
1975	85,694	−0.25%
1980	85,883	+0.04%
1985	84,542	−0.31%
1990	87,845	+0.77%
1995	91,592	+0.84%

Year	Pop.	±% p.a.
2000	92,017	+0.09%
2005	90,022	−0.44%
2010	87,530	−0.56%
2015	85,867	−0.38%
2020	85,838	−0.01%
2025	85,844	+0.00%

Source: Landesdatabank Nordrhein-Westfalen

== Politics ==
The current mayor of Lünen is Martina Förster-Teutenberg of the Social Democratic Party since November 2025.

Previous mayoral election was held on 13 September 2020, with a runoff held on 27 September, and the results were as follows:

Candidate	Party	First round		Second round	
Candidate	Party	Votes	%	Votes	%
Rainer Schmeltzer	Social Democratic Party	10864	40.9	9,824	48.9
Jürgen Kleine-Frauns	Independent	9,767	36.7	10282	51.1
Christoph Tölle	Christian Democratic Union	4,341	16.3		
Sascha Gottwald	Free Voters Lünen	1624	6.1		
Valid votes		26596	97.7	20,106	98.9
Invalid votes		641	2.3	215	1.1
Total		27237	100.0	20321	100.0
Electorate/voter turnout		66291	41.1	66,247	30.7
Source: City of Lünen (1st round, 2nd round)

=== City council ===
Results of the 2020 city council election

The Lünen city council governs the city alongside the Mayor. The most recent city council election was held on 13 September 2020, and the results were as follows:

Party	Votes	%	+/-	Seats	+/-
Social Democratic Party (SPD)	9066	33.9	▼7.0	19	▼3
Christian Democratic Union (CDU)	5895	22.1	▼2.5	12	▼1
Together for Lünen (GFL)	3835	14.4	▼1.1	8	▼1
Alliance 90/The Greens (Grüne)	3690	13.8	▲6.4	8	▲4
Alternative for Germany (AfD)	1816	6.8	New	4	New
Free Democratic Party (FDP)	922	3.5	▲0.7	2	±0
The Left (Die Linke)	846	3.2	▼0.9	2	±0
Free Voters Lünen (FW Lünen)	501	1.9	New	1	New
Independent Fohrmeister	85	0.3	New	0	New
Independent Rosenkranz	85	0.2	New	0	New
Independent God	19	0.1	New	0	New
Valid votes	26730	98.2			
Invalid votes	480	1.8			
Total	27210	100.0		56	▲2
Electorate/voter turnout	66291	41.1	▼3.4		
Source: City of Lünen

== Twin towns – sister cities ==
Lünen is twinned with:

- Bartın, Turkey
- Demmin, Germany
- Kamień Pomorski, Poland
- Panevėžys, Lithuania
- Salford, England, United Kingdom
- Zwolle, Netherlands

== Notable people ==
- Jens Beutel (1946–2019), SPD politician, mayor of Mainz 1997–2011
- Markus Brzenska (born 1984), footballer
- Karl-Heinz Granitza (born 1951), footballer
- Björn Höcke (born 1972), AfD politician, Member of Landtag in Thuringia
- Hubert Hüppe (born 1956), CDU politician
- Theodor Kleine (1924–2014), sprint canoer, Olympic medalist
- Friedhelm Konietzka (1938–2012), football player and coach
- Wilhelm Kuhne (born 1926), priest (Monsignore) and former rector of the Hardehausen Abbey
- Michael Mendl (born 1944), actor
- Max Raabe (born 1962), singer and conductor of the Palast Orchester in Berlin
- Berndt Röder (born 1948), CDU politician, former president of the Hamburgische Bürgerschaft
- Rollergirl (born 1975), singer
- Rüdiger Sagel (born 1955), politician Alliance 90/The Greens, later The Left, Member of Landtag North Rhine-Westphalia 1998–2012
- Max Simon (1899–1961), SS officer and war criminal
- Andreas Thiel (born 1960), handball player
- Eckhart Tolle (born 1948), spiritual teacher and author
- Clara Vogedes (1892–1983), artist
- Ernst Waldschmidt (1897–1985), orientalist and indologist
- Wolfgang Wendland (born 1962), singer, politician of the Pogo party
- Dieter Zorc (1939–2007), footballer
- Mathis Häseler (born 2002), German handball player
