= Berndt Röder =

German politician

President of the Hamburg Parliament
- In office March 2004 – February 2010
- Preceded by: Dorothee Stapelfeldt
- Succeeded by: Lutz Mohaupt

Personal details
- Born: 3 December 1948 (age 77) Lünen
- Party: Christian Democratic Union (CDU)
- Education: University of Hamburg

Berndt Röder (born 3 December 1948 in Lünen, North Rhine-Westphalia) is a German politician, representative of the German Christian Democratic Union.

Röder was born on 3 December 1948 in Lünen and married with three children. He studied law at the University of Hamburg.

Röder entered the German Christian Democratic Union in 1968. He has been a member of the state parliament since 2001. From March 2004 until February 2010 Roeder was President of the Hamburg Parliament. In 2004 Röder was criticized by the media and the Hamburg police union, because he checked how long it took the police to arrive in response to emergency calls. He is believed to have pressed a panic button. In Germany the abuse of an emergency call is actionable, Röder paid a fine of €2,500.

In 2010, Röder resigned from the position of President of the Hamburg Parliament because of the so-called Glaze ice affair in Hamburg. Röder made calls to the privy councils of the state ministry of environment, and state ministry of interior, and to the municipal councillor of Hamburg-Nord borough, Röder complained about the city's negligence not clearing the street—where he resided—of glaze ice. Hamburg's winter services were barely able to clean the main streets and roads. Röder was alleged to have used his political position to further his interests.

Preceded by Dorothee Stapelfeldt	President of the Hamburg Parliament; 2004–2010	Succeeded by Lutz Mohaupt
