= Clara Vogedes =

German painter

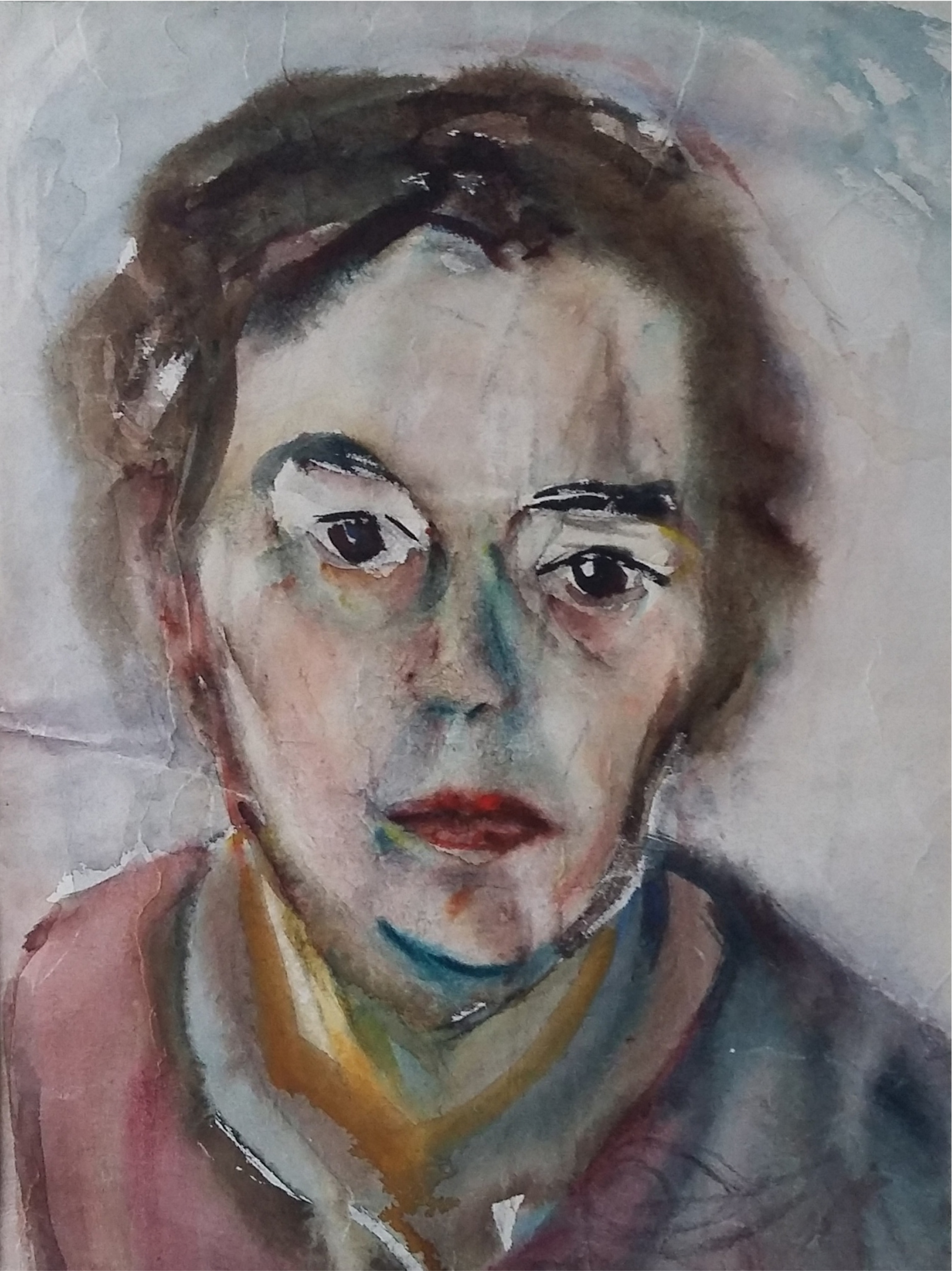
Self-portrait by Clara Vogedes

Clara Vogedes née Homscheidt (1892–1983) was a German painter.

== Life ==
Clara Vogedes was born into an upper-middle-class family in Krefeld. At the end of her school years she studied foreign languages in Rolle on Lake Geneva, graduating with the French diploma in interpreting. A visit in 1910 to an exhibition by Paula Modersohn-Becker inspired her to want to become a painter. She took lessons in watercolour painting with Henri Duvoisin in Geneva and later in oil painting with Henry van de Velde in Krefeld. (In her later years she painted very rarely in oils).

In 1917 she married the journalist, writer and homeland poet Alois Vogedes. Four daughters were born from their marriage.

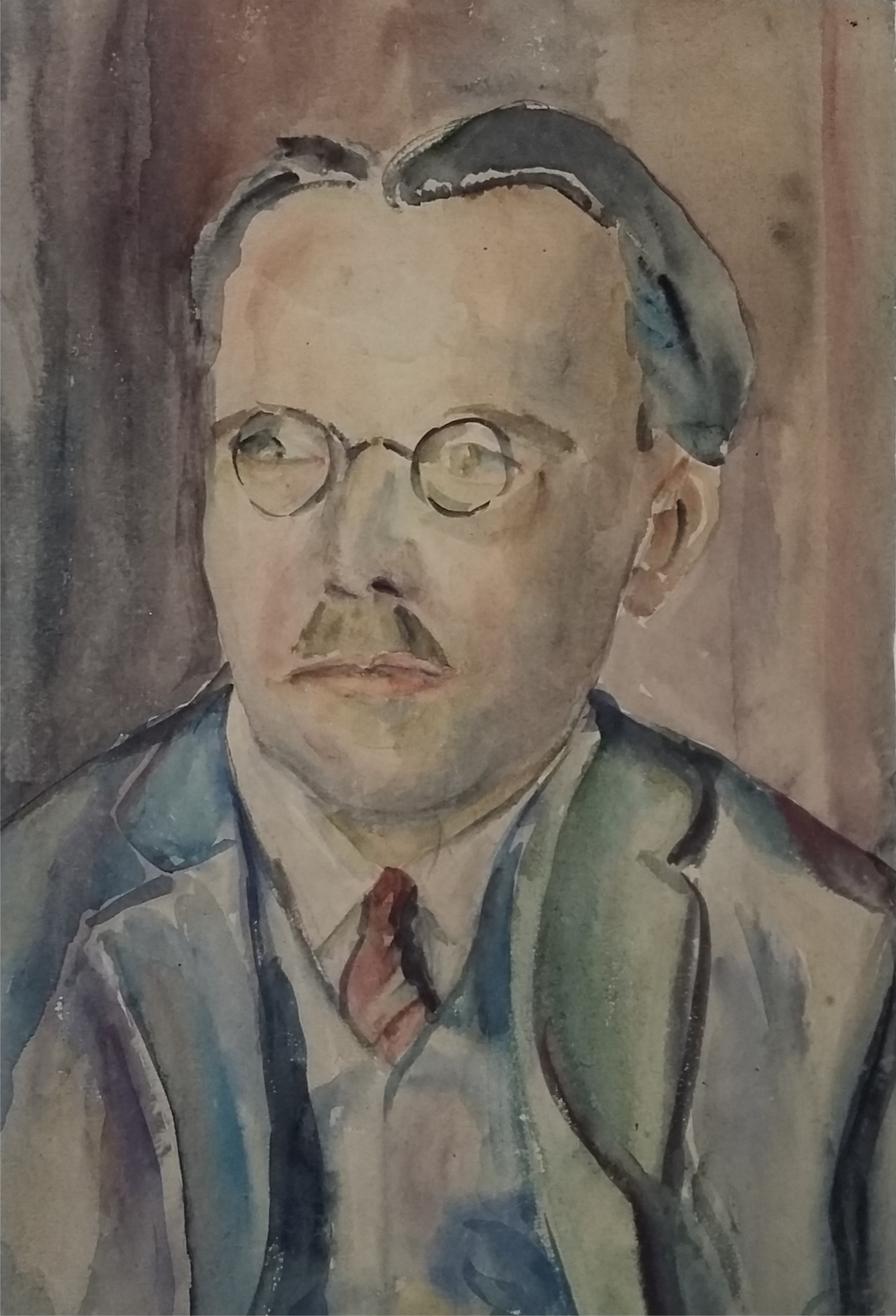
Alois Vogedes (by Clara Vogedes, 1929)

== Work ==
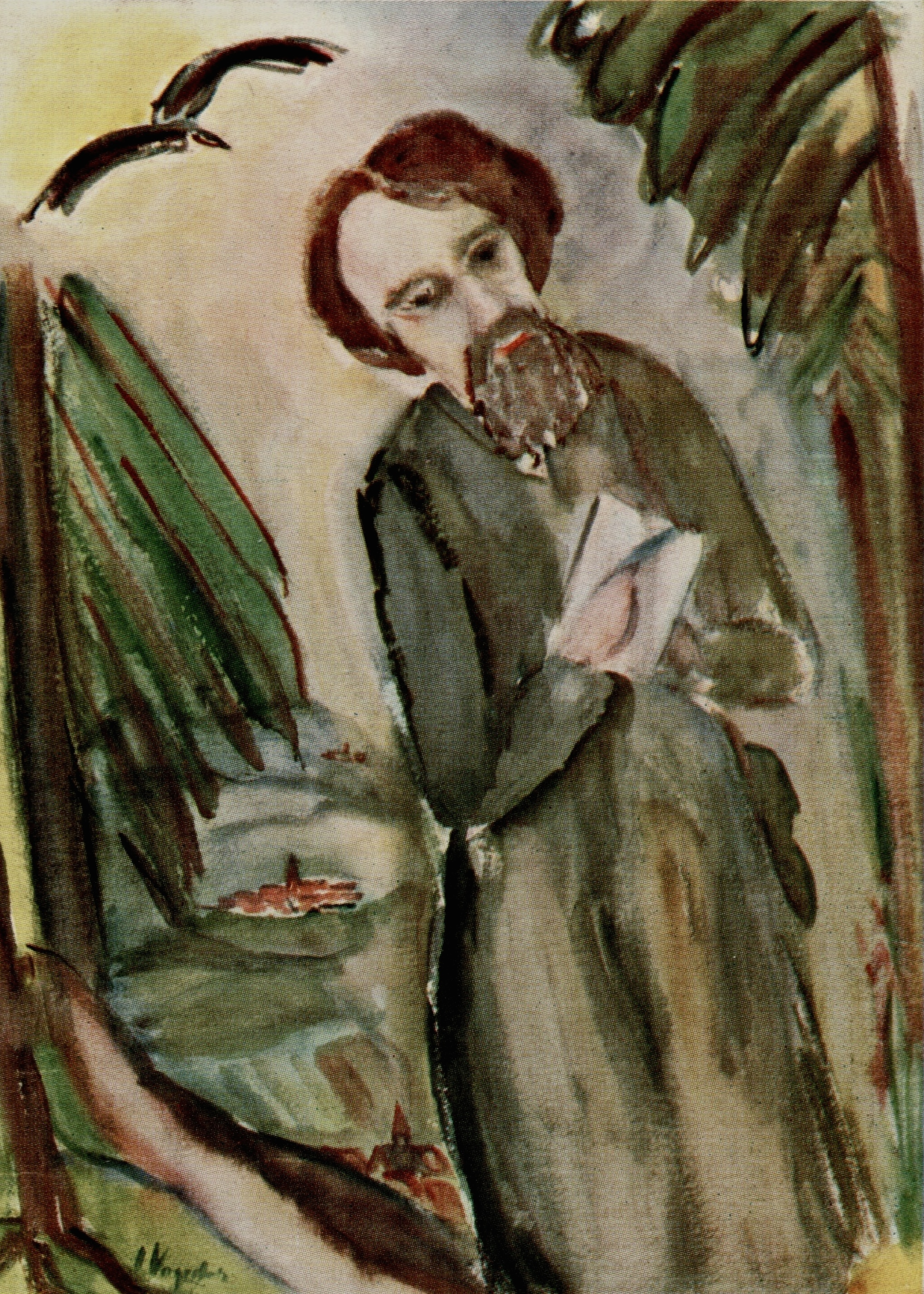
Peter Hille 1953

Her husband's republican leanings led to constant changes of employment and of places of residence. Alois worked as an editor for various newspapers, often also in the capacity of a journalist, in Hanover, Trier, Neunkirchen and Paderborn, among other locations. In each place Clara became part of the available literary and artistic circles, for instance in Hanover as part of the group around Kurt Schwitters, the central figure of "Hanover Dadaism", and in Paderborn as part of the group of poets that formed around her husband, sharing the legacy of Peter Hille.

In 1926 her husband was offered a position in Trier, where Clara Vogedes joined the Trier circle of painters. Her first solo exhibition took place in Trier in 1935.

In Neunkirchen she painted watercolours of the working world: men at blast furnaces, in rolling mills and wire-drawing shops.

In her husband's portrait (1929) and in her self-portrait "The Painter" (1933) can be seen to the full her mastery of watercolour painting technique, "which requires great concentration and skill, as once the colour has been applied, amendments are hardly possible." Shortly before the end of the war the family moved to Paderborn, where the city in ruins and the cathedral became her main topics.

"The watercolours of that time [...] show the remarkable mastery of the technique: delicate colour gradations, opalescent transitions from tone to tone, drastically contrasting shades of colour, dark accents, brittle, dry brush marks making visible the grain of the paper, then again the transparent overlapping of the colours in a sparse palette, the wiping of the colours, almost reminiscent of chalk drawings. The works are created briskly and with spontaneity, and always directly in front of the motif, they are 'works from the backpack', in Clara Vogedes' own words."

In the winter Vogedes devoted herself to batik, which she enriched with her knowledge of the colour gradation of watercolour painting. She often turned to religious themes and painted many Nativity scenes for Christmas exhibitions in the surrounding cities.

Watercolours of flower still lifes in dull pale colours seemed to forecast her husband's death in 1956. Deeply struck by her personal loss, she then stopped painting. Her youngest daughter brought her to her home in Lünen and set her up in her own studio, where at the age of 65 she turned to painting once more and began a new creative period.

She regularly took part in summer courses. In the late 1960s and early 1970s she enrolled in the "Internationale Sommerakademie für Bildende Kunst" (ISOAK) in Salzburg, founded in 1953 by Oskar Kokoschka, attending the classes of Emilio Vedova in abstract painting, Zao Wou-Ki and Jože Ciuha in nude and portrait painting. After some abstract compositions she returned to her own style.

In 1969 and 1970 Clara Vogedes spent the summer months in the "Atelier artistique international" in Séguret, where the painter Arthur Langlet arranged gatherings of artists from many countries practising all genres: painters, draughtsmen, graphic artists, photographers and sculptors. She painted "watercolour series facing landscape or sunsets, studying thunderstorms, the light and mood of the Camargue. Clara's watercolours vibrate: the light, air, atmosphere play into them, setting a strong lyrical accent. She is not concerned with exact rendering, but with the dimension of experience while lingering, e.g. in the landscape, painting as a 'message of existence'."

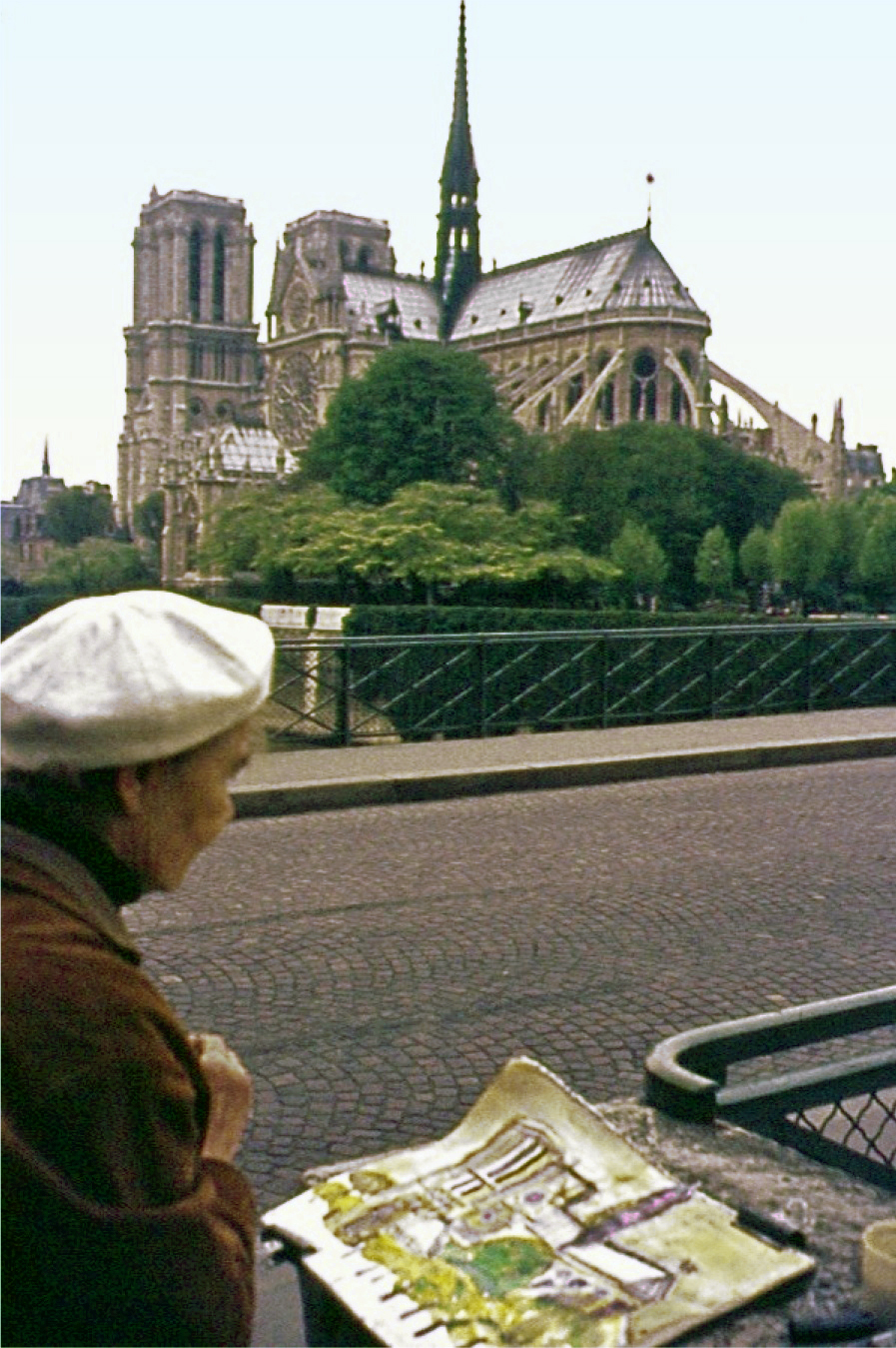
Clara Vogedes in front of Notre-Dame, Paris, April 1976

Vogedes travelled a great deal: to Greece (Rhodes, Crete), to Andalusia, France (especially to Paris, Brittany, Provence and the Camargue), to Prague and the Czech Republic, England, Norway, Denmark and even at the age of 85 to Egypt. She returned from her travelling with many drawings and landscape watercolours "which sometimes seem quite abstract like colour and light studies."

In 1977 she was hit by her first stroke, followed by a second in 1979. She then moved to Heilbronn to join her eldest daughter, a medical doctor, and died there in 1983.

== Legacy ==
In 1992, on her 100th anniversary, the city of Lünen dedicated a large retrospective to her work. The exhibition's opening: "Rainy day in Lünen. A city wraps itself in grey-brown colours. Silhouettes blur before the eye of the beholder, appear washed out and dull. The November mood so aptly depicted by Clara Vogedes, immortalised as a watercolour many years ago, hardly differs from the cloudy grey tones of yesterday's weather". In 1999 a street in Lünen was named after Clara Vogedes.

== Influence ==
Young artists remain interested in Clara Vogedes' work. The 2005 exhibition "Pictures from the Backpack - Pictures without Sketches", held at Studio Group Lünen in Heinz Cymontkowski's studio contrasted Clara Vogedes’ pictures with his own creations from 2000 onwards.

Two of her granddaughters have followed in her footsteps: Kristine Oßwald (1961-2017), draughtswoman and video artist, and Dr. Cornelia Oßwald-Hoffmann, art historian and freelance curator for contemporary art.

== Selected works ==
Clara Vogedes – private collection

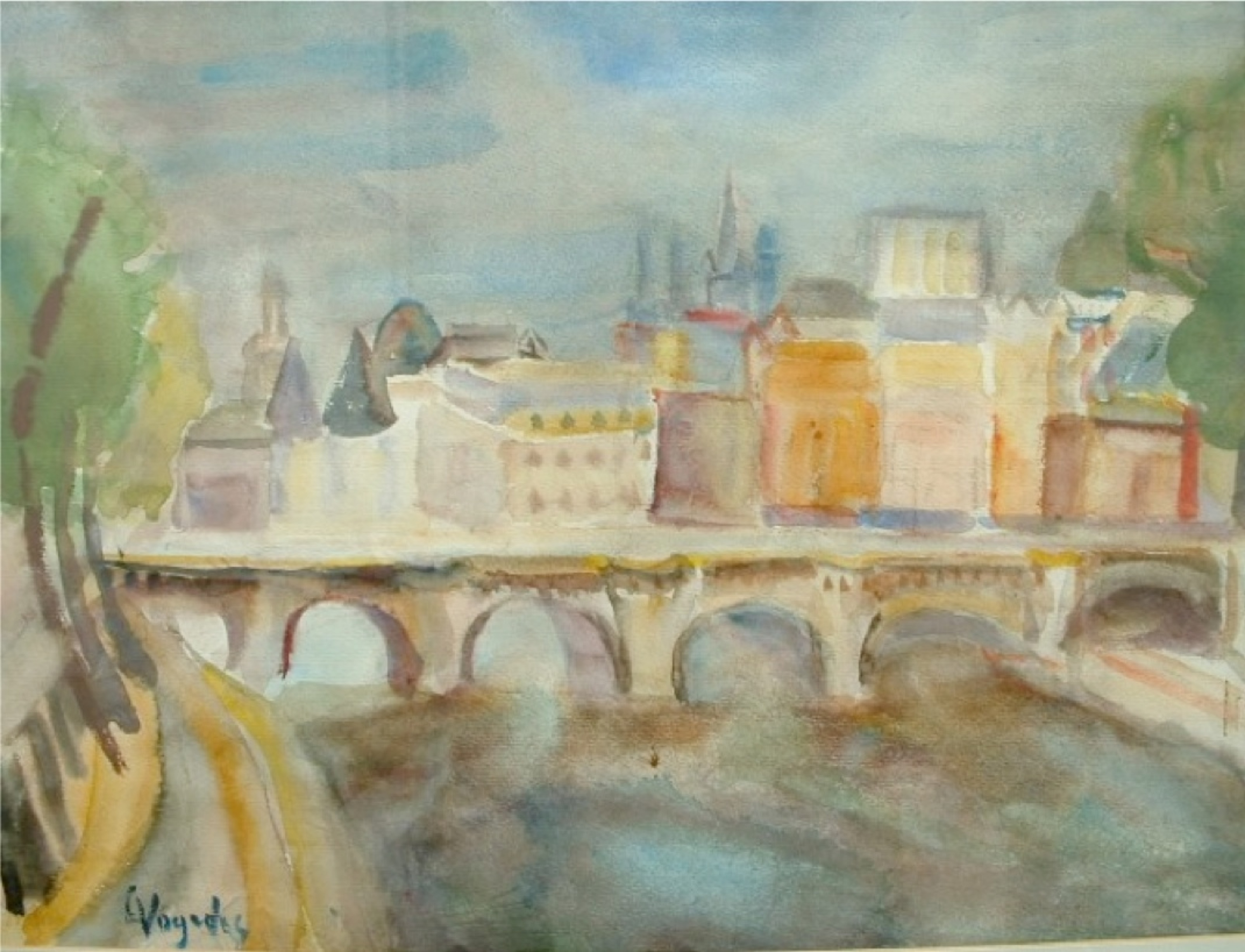
Paris Tempest (1976)

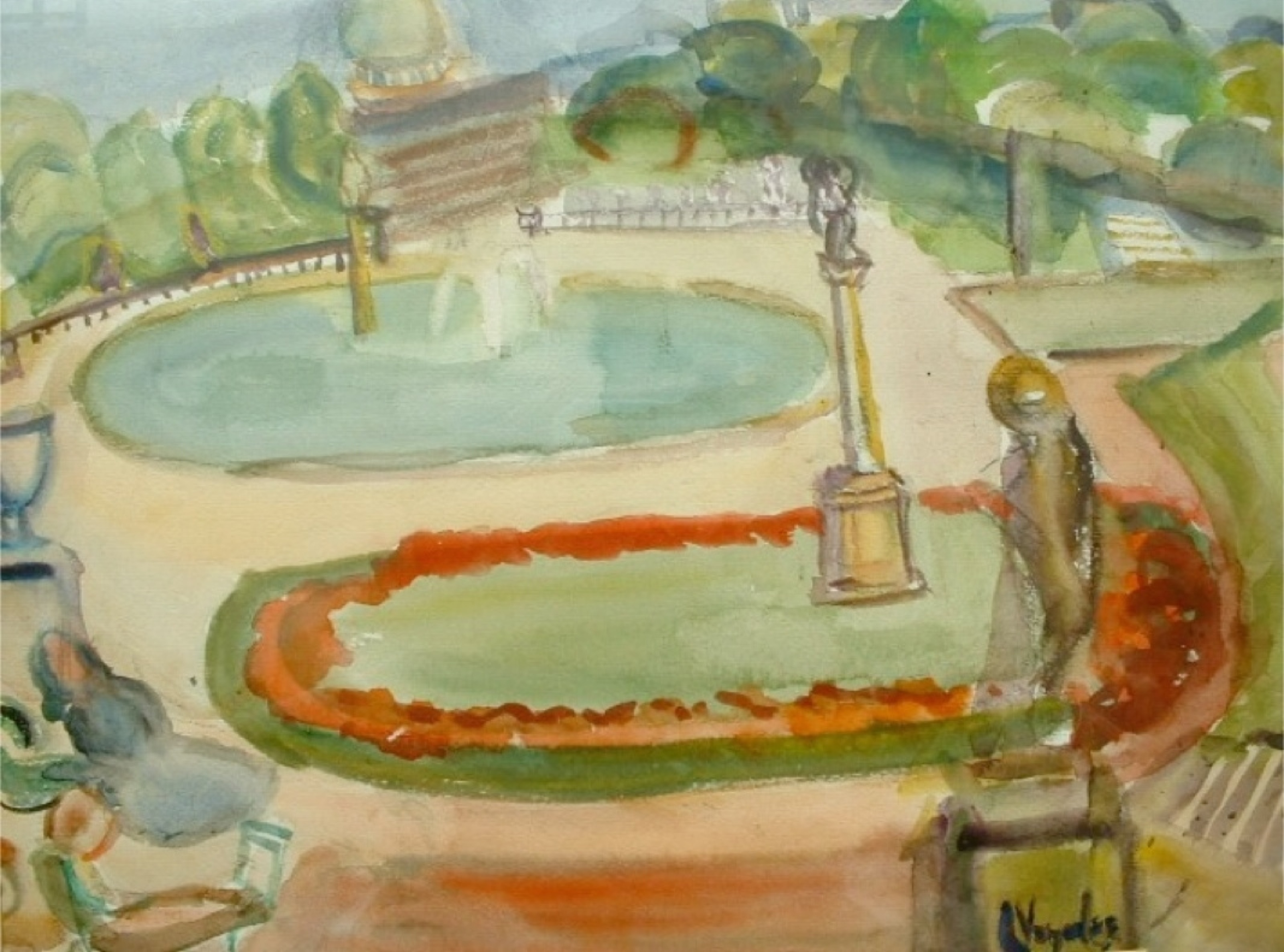
Paris Luxemburg Gardens (1976)

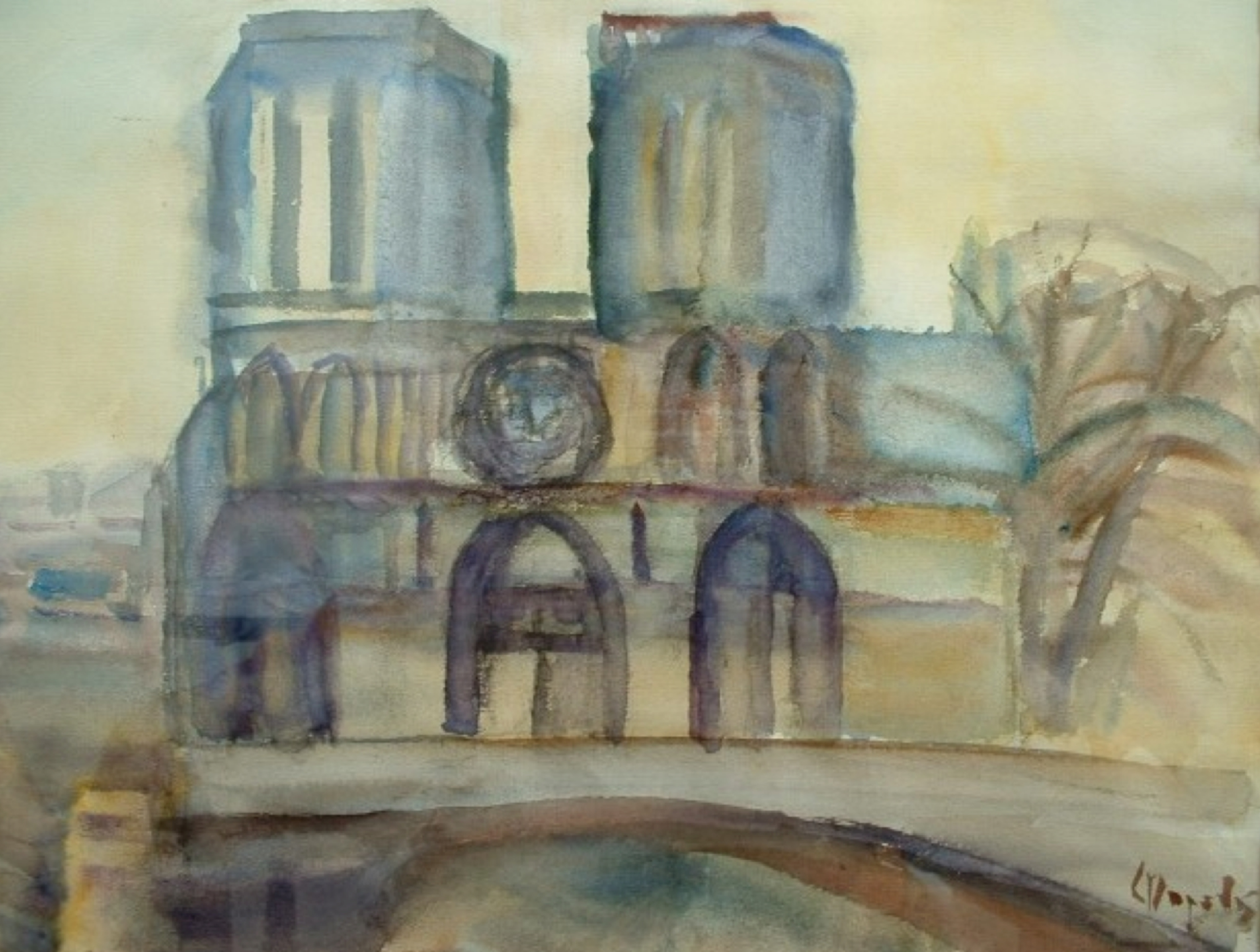
Paris Notre-Dame after Easter Mass (1976)

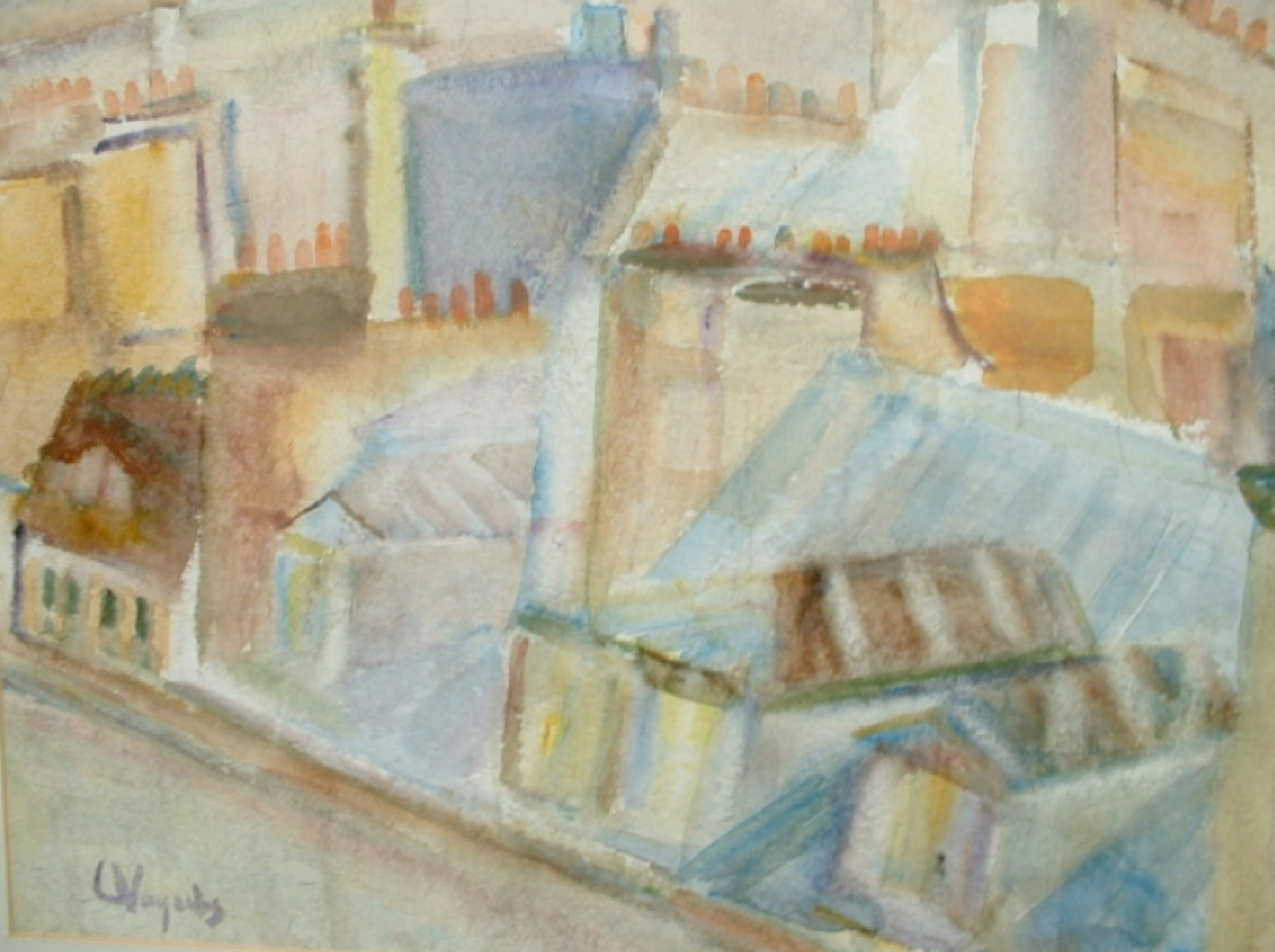
Rue de la Huchette, Roofs of Paris (1976)
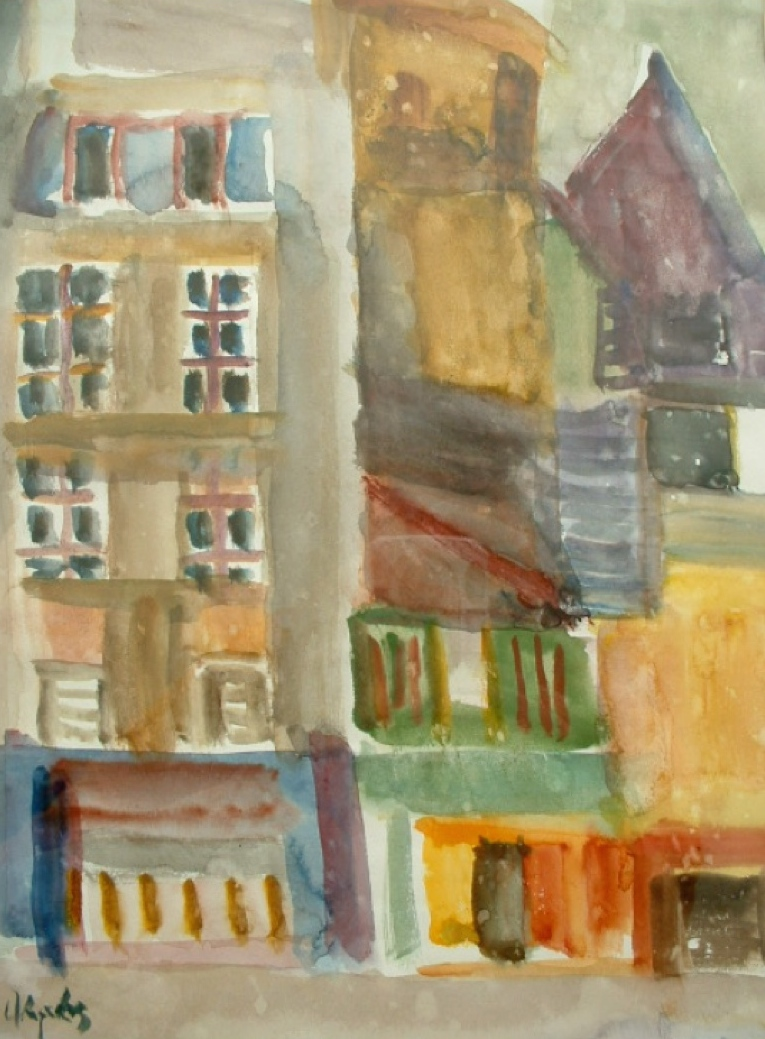
Paris Rue Galande

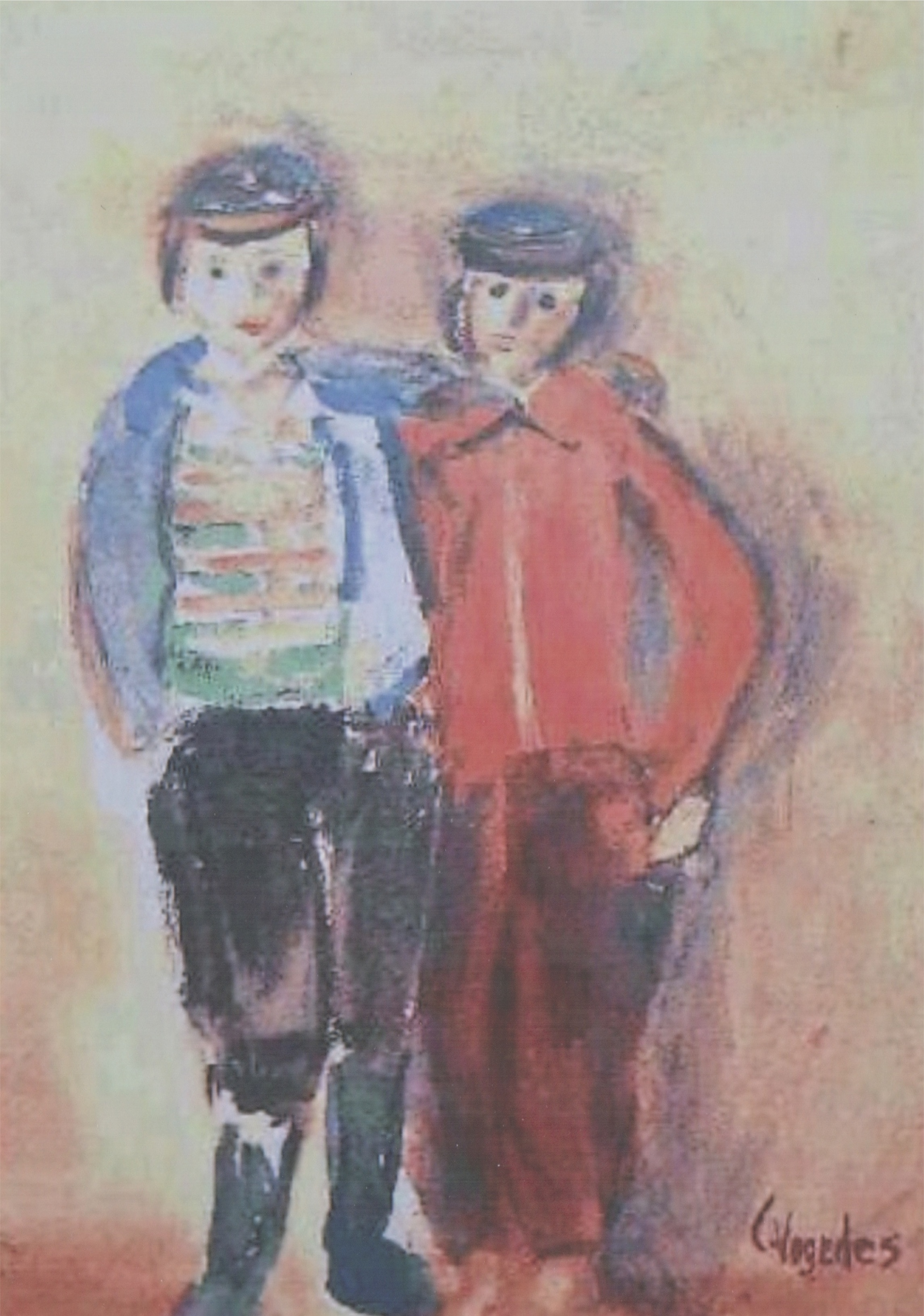
Youngsters from Lünen

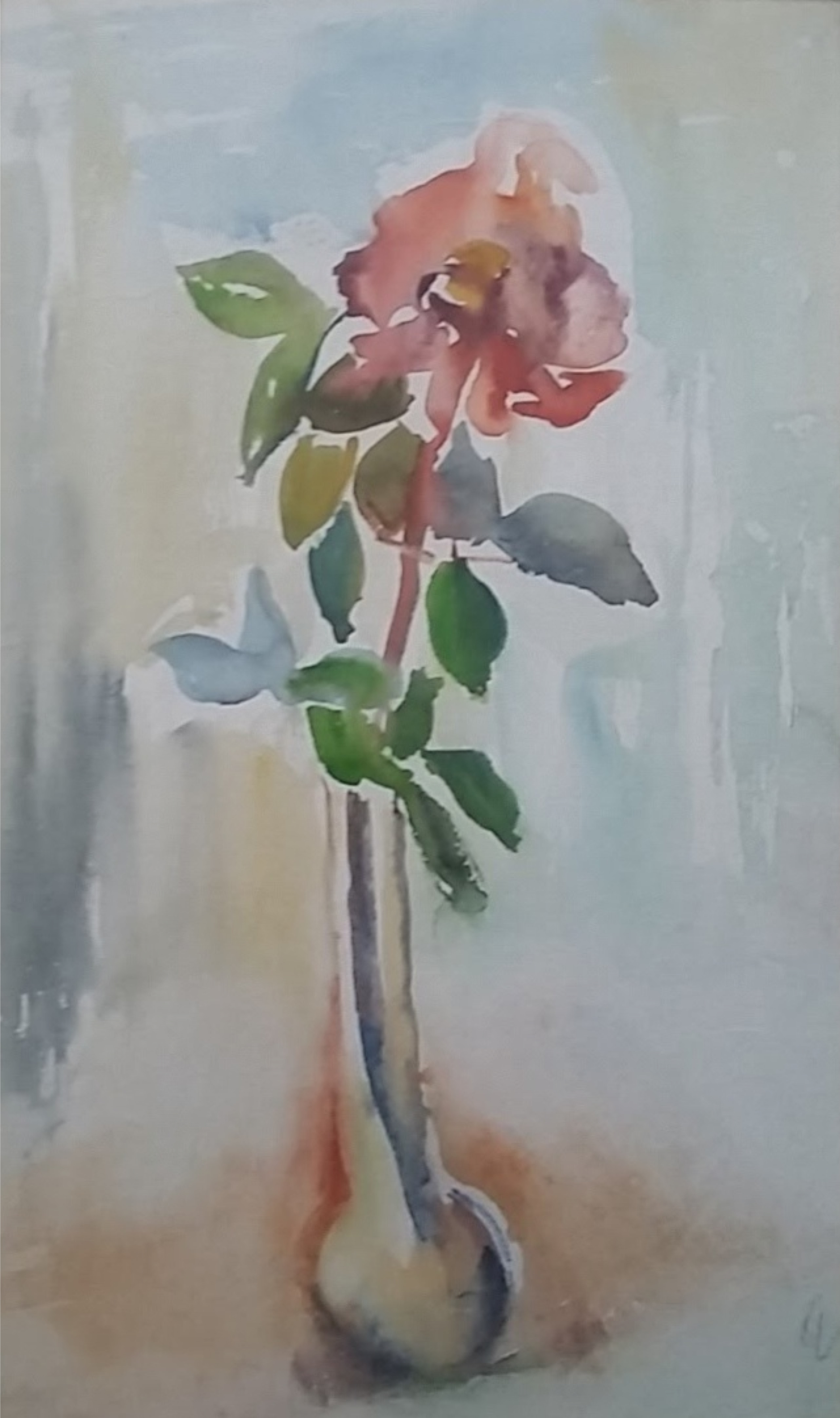
Rose in a phial

== Exhibitions ==
- 1932 Trier Casinosaal
- 1935–1939 Koblenz / Trier
- 1941 Saarbrücken Staatliches Museum
- 1942 Neunkirchen (Saar) Saalbau
- 1946 Münster Landesmuseum
- 1948 Bielefeld Galerie "William" mit Otto Pankok
- 1949 Landau in der Pfalz "Kunst im Südwesten"
- 1954 Bielefeld WBK
- 1956 Bielefeld Galerie "Die kleine Brücke"
- 1959 Bielefeld "Dokumentation der Künstler in NRW"
- 1964 Bremen Galerie "Schnoor"
- 1967 Bielefeld Neues Museum
- 1970 Dortmund Rheinisch-Westfälische Auslandsgesellschaft "Bilder der Provence"
- 1971 Lüdinghausen Burg Vischering "Rosenbilder"
- 1971 Heilbronn Stadtmuseum "Heilbronn im Aquarell"
- 1971 Selm Gruppenausstellung in der Friedenskirche zum Thema "Vom Frieden leben wir" zusammen mit Werken von Ernst Barlach, Käthe Kollwitz und Otto Dix.
- 1972 Lüdinghausen "Deutsche Landschaften"
- 1972 Nordkirchen Schloss "Griechische Impressionen"
- 1972–1976 Einzel- und Gruppenausstellungen in Lemgo, Trier, Selm, Krefeld, Höxter (Kloster Corvey), Lünen, Lüdinghausen
- 1976 Dortmund Siemens AG Kasino "Paris - Aquarelle, Kohlezeichnungen, Lithographien"
- 1976 Arnsberg Sauerlandmuseum "Städte und Landschaften"
- 1977 Salzburg Trakelhaus "Bilder aus Salzburg 1965–1975"
- 1978 Lünen Heinz Hilpert Theater
- 1984 Lünen Sparkasse "Aquarelle aus Paderborn"
- 1985 Paderborn Medienzentrum für das Erzbistum PB "Bilder aus Paderborn"
- 1988 Buc (France, Yvelines) Centre culturel des Arcades "Clara Vogedes Aquarelles"
- 1992 Nieheim St. Nikolaus Wohnstift "Aquarelle"
- 1992 Lünen Stadtgalerie des Kulturamtes "Retrospektive Clara Vogedes 1892-1992"
- 1993–2010 Weitere Einzel- und Gruppenausstellungen in Städten Nordrhein Westfalens zu religiösen Themen (Krippenmotive in Aquarell, Batiken, Lithographien) in Lünen, Bergkamen, Telgte
- 2008 Lünen "Bilder aus dem Rucksack"
- 2010 Worpswede/Teufelsmoor "Ulice id est Moer" Kunst- und Kulturtage
