= European Aquatics U20 Water Polo Championship =

International youth water polo competition

- Sport: Water polo
- Founded: 1970
- Organizing body: European Aquatics
- No. of teams: 16
- Continent: Europe
- Most recent champions: Men; Croatia (2nd title); Women; Hungary (2nd title)
- Most titles: Men; Serbia (11 titles); Women; Netherlands; Russia (4 titles each)
- Related competitions: European Aquatics U16 Water Polo Championship; European Aquatics U18 Water Polo Championship

The European Aquatics U20 Water Polo Championship, previously known as the LEN European U19 Water Polo Championship, is a continental water polo tournament held every two years for the players under the age of 20. It was launched by LEN in 1970 for men and in 1994 for women. With the 2026 competition, the age category was changed from U19 to U20.

== Results ==
Since 2011:

1. M U19:
2. M U17:
3. M U15:
4. W U19:
5. W U17:
6. W U15:

== Men's tournament ==
=== History ===
Ed.	Year	Host	(gold) Gold	(silver) Silver	(bronze) Bronze
1	1970	Rotterdam, Netherlands	Soviet Union	Spain	West Germany
2	1971	Barcelona, Spain	Hungary	Spain	Soviet Union
3	1973	Duisburg, West Germany	Hungary	Soviet Union	Spain
4	1975	Jönköping, Sweden	Soviet Union	Spain	Hungary
5	1976	Valletta, Malta	Italy	Hungary	Spain
6	1978	Budapest, Hungary	Soviet Union	Hungary	West Germany
7	1980	Sittard, Netherlands	Spain	Soviet Union	Hungary
8	1982	Varna, Bulgaria	Italy	Romania	Soviet Union
9	1984	Santa Cruz de Tenerife, Spain	Italy	Yugoslavia	Spain
10	1986	West Berlin	West Germany	Soviet Union	Hungary
11	1988	Veenendaal, Netherlands	Yugoslavia	Soviet Union	Hungary
12	1990	Varna, Bulgaria	Yugoslavia	Czechoslovakia	Hungary
13	1992	Sopron, Hungary	Hungary	Spain	Greece
14	1994	Bratislava, Slovakia	Hungary	Croatia	Spain
15	1996	Istanbul, Turkey	Yugoslavia	Hungary	Croatia
16	1998	Bratislava, Slovakia	Yugoslavia	Italy	Croatia
17	2000	Kamen/Lünen, Germany	Yugoslavia	Greece	Italy
18	2002	Bari, Italy	Yugoslavia	Hungary	Italy
19	2004	Valletta, Malta	Serbia and Montenegro	Croatia	Hungary
20	2006	Oradea, Romania	Serbia	Hungary	Spain
21	2008	Istanbul, Turkey	Montenegro	Spain	Serbia
22	2010	Stuttgart, Germany	Italy	Greece	Croatia
23	2012	Canet-en-Roussillon, France	Italy	Serbia	Croatia
24	2014	Tbilisi, Georgia	Serbia	Hungary	Croatia
25	2016	Alphen aan den Rijn, Netherlands	Serbia	Italy	Spain
26	2018	Minsk, Belarus	Greece	Montenegro	Spain
27	2022	Podgorica, Montenegro	Serbia	Spain	Hungary
28	2024	Burgas, Bulgaria	Croatia	Montenegro	Spain
29	2026	Varna, Bulgaria	Croatia	Spain	Italy

=== Medal table ===
Rank	Nation	Gold	Silver	Bronze	Total
1	Serbia	11	2	1	14
2	Italy	5	2	3	10
3	Hungary	4	6	7	17
4	Soviet Union	3	4	2	9
5	Croatia	2	2	5	9
6	Spain	1	7	8	16
7	Greece	1	2	1	4
8	Montenegro	1	2	0	3
9	West Germany	1	0	2	3
10	Czechoslovakia	0	1	0	1
10	Romania	0	1	0	1
Totals (11 entries)		29	29	29	87

== Women's tournament ==
=== History ===
Ed.	Year	Host	(gold) Gold	(silver) Silver	(bronze) Bronze
1	1994	Arnhem, Netherlands	Netherlands	Greece	Hungary
2	1996	Netanya, Israel	Netherlands	Germany	Hungary
3	1998	Millfield, Great Britain	Hungary	Russia	Greece
4	2000	Plzeň, Czech Republic	Russia	Hungary	Greece
5	2002	Loulé, Portugal	Greece	Hungary	Spain
6	2004	Bari, Italy	Netherlands	Greece	Russia
7	2006	Kirishi, Russia	Russia	Netherlands	Hungary
8	2008	Chania, Greece	Italy	Hungary	Russia
9	2010	Dniprodzerzhynsk, Ukraine	Russia	Spain	Hungary
10	2012	Chelyabinsk, Russia	Russia	Hungary	Italy
11	2014	Ostia, Italy	Greece	Italy	Spain
12	2016	The Hague, Netherlands	Netherlands	Spain	Greece
13	2018	Funchal, Portugal	Spain	Russia	Netherlands
14	2022	Netanya, Israel	Spain	Hungary	Greece
15	2024	Zagreb, Croatia	Spain	Hungary	Greece
16	2026	Oeiras, Portugal	Hungary	Spain	Netherlands

=== Medal table ===
Rank	Nation	Gold	Silver	Bronze	Total
1	Russia	4	2	2	8
2	Netherlands	4	1	2	7
3	Spain	3	3	2	8
4	Hungary	2	6	4	12
5	Greece	2	2	5	9
6	Italy	1	1	1	3
7	Germany	0	1	0	1
Totals (7 entries)		16	16	16	48

== See also ==
- European Aquatics U16 Water Polo Championship
- European Aquatics U18 Water Polo Championship
