= Hamburg Parliament =

State legislature in Germany

Hamburg Parliament Hamburgische Bürgerschaft

Type
- Type: Landtag
- Established: 1410

Leadership
- President of the Hamburg Parliament: Carola Veit, SPD since 23 March 2011

Structure
- Seats: 121
- Political groups: Government (70) SPD (45) Greens (25) Opposition (51) CDU (26) The Left (15) AfD (9) Non-attached (1) AfD (1)

Elections
- Last election: 2 March 2025
- Next election: 2030

Meeting place
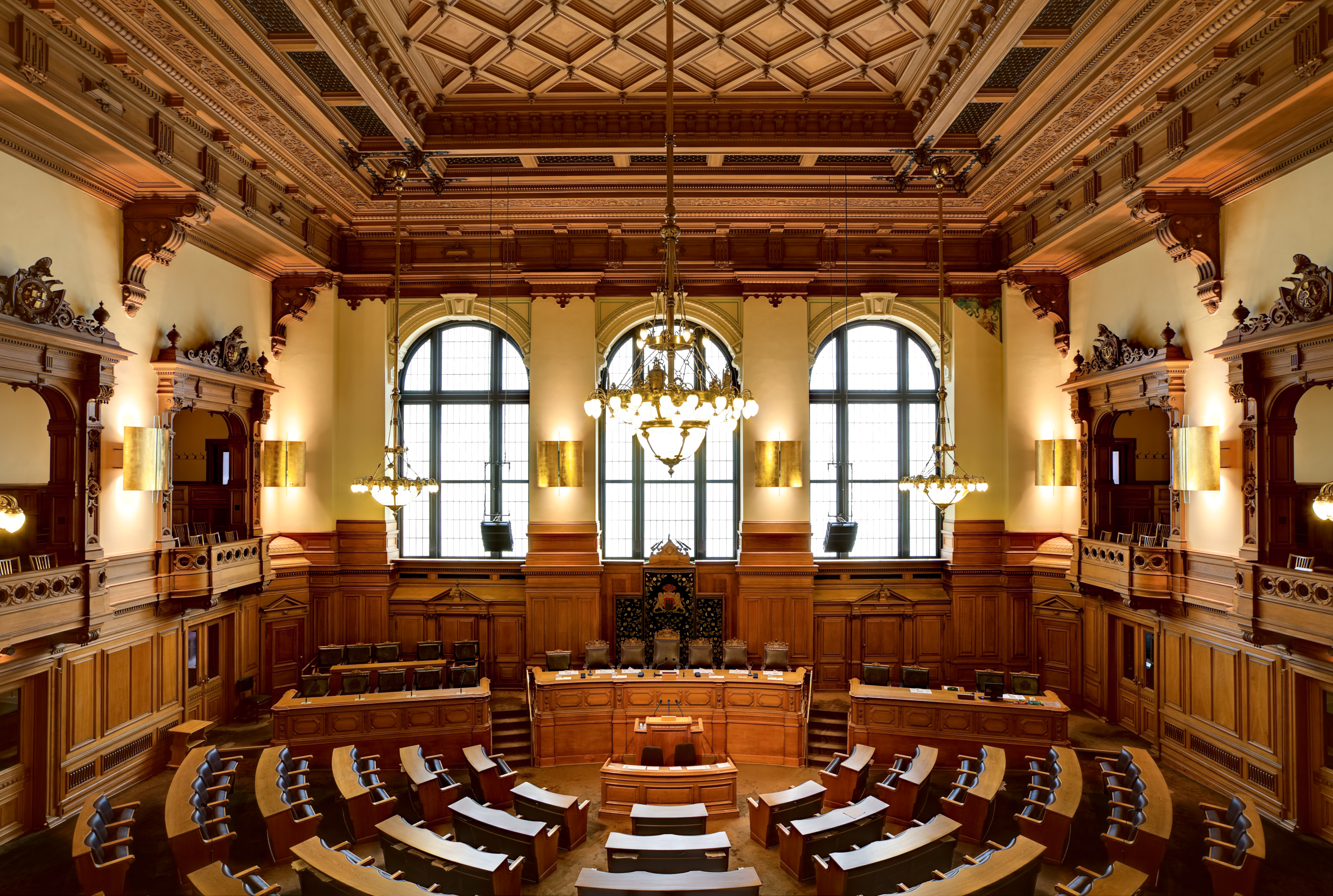
- Hamburg Rathaus

Website
- Hamburgische Bürgerschaft

The Hamburg Parliament (German: Hamburgische Bürgerschaft; literally “Hamburgish Citizenry” or, more poetically, “Hamburgish Burgessry”) is the unicameral legislature of the German state of Hamburg according to the constitution of Hamburg. As of 2025 there are 121 sitting members, representing 17 electoral districts. The parliament is situated in the city hall Hamburg Rathaus and is part of the Government of Hamburg.

The parliament is among other things responsible for the law, the election of the Erster Bürgermeister (First Mayor) for the election period and the control of the Senate (cabinet).

The President of the Hamburg Parliament is the highest official person of the Free and Hanseatic City of Hamburg.

Its members are elected in universal, direct, free, equal and secret elections every five years.

== History ==
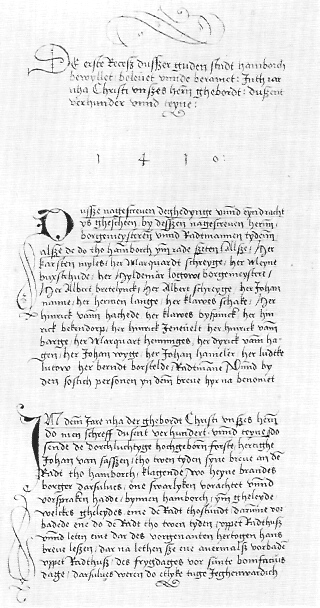
The first known document of the Erbgesessene Bürgerschaft, Erster Rezess of 1410

=== Origins ===
Bürgerschaft (literally citizenry) is a term in use since the Middle Ages to refer to the male inhabitants of Hamburg with citizenship. A committee of the landowning class within the city, called Erbgesessene Bürgerschaft, was formed out of this group in the 15th century to consult with the city's ruling councillors (Ratsherren; later called the "Senate of Hamburg" following the Roman example), and to be consulted by them.

The city council, in early times supposedly elected by male citizens, had turned into an autocratic body restaffing its vacancies by coöptation. The system of coöptating seats was prone to corruption and it came to several major struggles in the following decades. The first relevant document organising power and tasks of citizenry and the city council (government), which was traditionally dominated by the local merchants, dates back to 1410 and is named Erster Rezess (roughly: The first Settlement, literally the agreement reached before parting [Lat. recedere] of the negotiating partners).

The Erster Rezess came about after the city council (Senate, no parliament but the government) had cited and arrested Heyne Brandes, a burgher of Hamburg. Brandes had claims due against John IV, Duke of Saxe-Lauenburg from a credit which Brandes had granted earlier. Brandes had taken the defaulting duke, during his visit in Hamburg in 1410, to task and dunned him in a way the duke considered insulting. The duke complained to the senate, which then interrogated Brandes. He admitted the dunning, and thus the senate arrested him. This caused a civic uproar of Hamburgers.

"In Hamburg as in other cities, the parishes ... had been not only church districts but also municipal political districts since the Middle Ages. They ... formed four incorporated bodies (Petri, Nikolai, Katharinen, Jacobi) in which the "allodial" (property-owning) burghers and the heads of guilds – thus only a fraction of the male population – were entitled to vote." The enfranchised citizens, grouped along their parishes, then elected from each of the then four parishes 12 representatives (deacons), the Council of the Forty-Eighters (die Achtundvierziger), who on Saint Lawrence Day (August 10) stipulated with the senate the Recess of 1410 (later called Erster Rezess).

The Erster Rezess is now considered Hamburg's oldest constitutional act, establishing first principles balancing the power of the government of the city-state and its citizens. The Erster Rezess established the principle that in Hamburg nobody may be arrested at the government's will but only after a prior judicial hearing and conviction (except of in flagrante delicto). Furthermore, the Erster Rezess stipulated that the council (senate) has to synchronise with the citizens in all severe matters, such as war, contracts with foreign powers, or decisions as to levying new or raising higher taxes, by convoking the citizens in plenary assembly. The plenary assemblies met in front of the city hall. With an overall population of roughly 10,000 people and only a minority among the male adults enjoying citizenship, the plenary assemblies of the citizenry (the Bürgerschaft) formed a functioning body, though with restricted authority.

The Forty-Eighters persisted, serving as opinion-forming committee within the citizenry, and developed into the first permanent representation of the citizens of Hamburg. Further settlements (Rezesse) between senate and Bürgerschaft constituted the more formalised coöperation between them. "The Reformation brought with it a significant curtailment of the senate's governmental power." In Hamburg the Reformation started in 1524 and was adopted by the Senate in 1529, fixed by the Langer Rezess (roughly: Long Settlement, negotiated for more than a year). The Langer Rezess made the ruling council (senate) accountable to several civic committees, forming together the Erbgesessene Bürgerschaft.

"At about the same time, three deacons from each parish (twelve altogether), acting as "chief elders", took on the task of centralizing, administering, and uniformly distributing relief to the poor." The chief elders were also entitled to decide with the senate in all matters concerning the welfare and the concord of the city, and formed thus besides Bürgerschaft and senate the third constitutive body, however, excluded from government again by the new constitution of 1859. The Forty-Eighters, now called Kollegium der Diakone (collegial panel of the deacons) continued to exist and the plenary assembly of citizens was replaced by the Assembly of the 144 (Hundertvierundvierziger, or formally: Kollegium der Diakone und Subdiakone), comprising 36 representatives (12 deacons and 24 subdeacons) from each parish.

Later the parishioners of St. Michael's Church in the New Town, established as parish independent of St. Nicholas in 1647, were granted the same rights as the burghers in one of the four parishes in the Old Town, and the same number of representatives. "Beginning in 1685, there were thus fifteen chief elders: sixty deacons instead of forty-eight and 180 assembly members altogether, rather than 144. These structures existed into the nineteenth century, with each college recruiting new members from the next larger." This assembly of 180 (as of 1685) was more and more identified as the Erbgesessene Bürgerschaft, although the council of the Sixty (extended from the Forty-Eighters) was a panel previously subsumed as part of it.

Since Lutheran parishes and the collegial bodies staffed with their parishioners formed the constitutional bodies of Hamburg there was no easy way to open politics for non-Lutherans. Bürgerschaft, chief elders and senate could not settle all aspects of the sensitive balance of power. Thus, a commission, sent by the emperor of the Holy Roman Empire, had to secure the peace by force in 1708 and the city was once more negotiating and reforming her own administrative structures in the following years.

The Vormärz led to even more criticism of the established structures and Hamburg participated in the elections of the Frankfurt Parliament in 1848. This resulted in even more debates and the Erbgesessene Bürgerschaft passed a new electoral law to meet the criticism in September 1848 but the restoration, supported and enforced by Prussian troops during the First Schleswig War, turned the table.

=== Elections of 1859 ===
A new attempt to reform the constitution was launched after long discussions in 1859 and the Erbgesessene Bürgerschaft met for the last time in November of this year to establish a new order as well as to disband itself in favour of the Bürgerschaft. Since 1859 Bürgerschaft refers to this elected parliamentary body.

=== Hamburg parliament in the Federal Republic ===
The Social Democratic Party of Germany (SPD) maintained its influence over the city's politics during the 1949 elections. Their victory was significant during a time of considerable reconstruction and reform in Germany. The SPD continued to govern Hamburg from that time forward, except from 1953 to 1957, when the Christian Democratic Union (CDU) was in power. After this period, however, the SPD regained control and developed Hamburg's political, social, and economic faucets, stretching their influence late into the 20th century.

Since March 23, 2011 the Hamburg Parliament has been in its 20th legislative period in the Federal Republic of Germany. A SPD-Government succeeded a coalition of CDU and the Greens.

== Electoral system ==
Since 2008 Hamburg elections have been held using an open-list system of proportional representation. The Sainte-Laguë method is used to distributed seats. Each voter has ten votes: Five votes can be cast for local constituency candidates and five for candidates on each party's state list. The state is divided into 17 constituencies of 3-5 seats. 71 representatives are elected in these based on the result of the constituency vote. A further 50 seats are elected as state list seat, based on the number of state list votes received by each party, distributed in such a way that the distribution of all 121 is proportional to the state list vote. Only parties receiving more than 5% of the state list votes are eligible to receive state list seats; there is no legal threshold for constituency seats.

If a party receiving less than 5% of the vote wins one or more constituency seats, the size of the legislature is increased beyond 121 members. A further seat is added if necessary, to ensure that the total number of members is odd.

== Organisation ==
=== President and board ===
The President of the Hamburg Parliament (Präsidentin bzw. Präsident der Hamburgischen Bürgerschaft) presides over plenary sessions and represents the Parliament in official matters. The President is responsible for ensuring that parliamentary proceedings are conducted in accordance with the rules of procedure and that debates are chaired fairly and impartially. The office also has responsibilities relating to the administration and representation of the Parliament. The President is elected by the members of the Bürgerschaft for the duration of the legislative period. By parliamentary convention, the largest parliamentary group has the right to nominate a candidate for the presidency.

The President is supported by the Presidium (Präsidium), which assists with the management and conduct of parliamentary business. In the current legislative period, the Presidium consists of the President, a First Vice-President, three additional Vice-Presidents, and two secretaries. All members of the Presidium are elected by the Parliament at the beginning of a legislative period.

The Vice-Presidents assist the President in chairing plenary sessions and may preside over meetings in the President's place. When chairing proceedings, they are expected to apply the rules impartially, regulate speaking time, and maintain order in the chamber. They may also represent the Parliament at official events and appointments.

The two secretaries (Schriftführerinnen bzw. Schriftführer) assist with procedural matters during parliamentary sittings. Their duties include helping to organize votes and elections, collecting and counting ballot papers where required, and recording the results of certain proceedings. They may also call members by name during roll-call votes.

Although members of the Presidium have specific procedural responsibilities, they remain members of the Bürgerschaft and retain their political rights as elected representatives. Their position in the Presidium therefore does not require them to give up their party affiliation or their right to participate in parliamentary decisions. However, when presiding over a sitting, the President and Vice-Presidents are expected to conduct proceedings fairly and impartially.

List of presidents of the Hamburg Parliament since 1859
Term	Name
1859–1861	Dr. Johannes Versmann
1861–1863	Dr. Isaac Wolffson
1863–1865	Dr. Hermann Baumeister
1865–1868	Dr. Georg Kunhardt
1868–1868	Dr. Hermann Baumeister
1869–1869	Johann A. T. Hoffmann
1869–1877	Dr. Hermann Baumeister
1877–1885	Dr. Gerhard Hachmann
1885–1892	Dr. Otto Mönckeberg
1892–1902	Siegmund Hinrichsen
1902–1913	Julius Engel
1913–1919	Dr. Alexander Schön
1919–1920	Berthold Grosse
1920–1928	Rudolf Ross
1928–1931	Max Hugo Leuteritz
1931–1933	Dr. Herbert Ruscheweyh
1946	Dr. Herbert Ruscheweyh
1946–1960	Adolph Schönfelder
1960–1978	Herbert Dau
1978–1982	Peter Schulz
1982–1983	Dr. Martin Willich
1983–1986	Peter Schulz
1986–1987	Dr. Martin Willich
1987–1987	Elisabeth Kiausch
1987–1991	Helga Elstner
1991–1993	Elisabeth Kiausch
1993–2000	Ute Pape
2000–2004	Dr. Dorothee Stapelfeldt
2004–2010	Berndt Röder
2010–2011	Lutz Mohaupt
2011–2011	Dr. Dorothee Stapelfeldt
2011–present	Carola Veit

=== Council of Elders ===
The Council of Elders (German: Ältestenrat) consists of the president, the vice presidents and several members, appointed by the parliamentary groups. The council support the president and the board regarding decisions of the agenda, personnel matters, and financial affairs.

=== Parliamentary groups ===
Parliamentary groups (Fraktionen) are pooled by minimum 6 members of the parliament. Most these groups are by one party.

=== Committees ===
The daily work of the parliament is done in committees.

== Candidates' qualifications ==
The qualification is regulated by law. As of 2008, candidate must be at least 18 years old, and must not be allowed to vote by a verdict, is patient of a psychiatric ward under law, or has a representative under law.
