= Carola Veit =

German politician

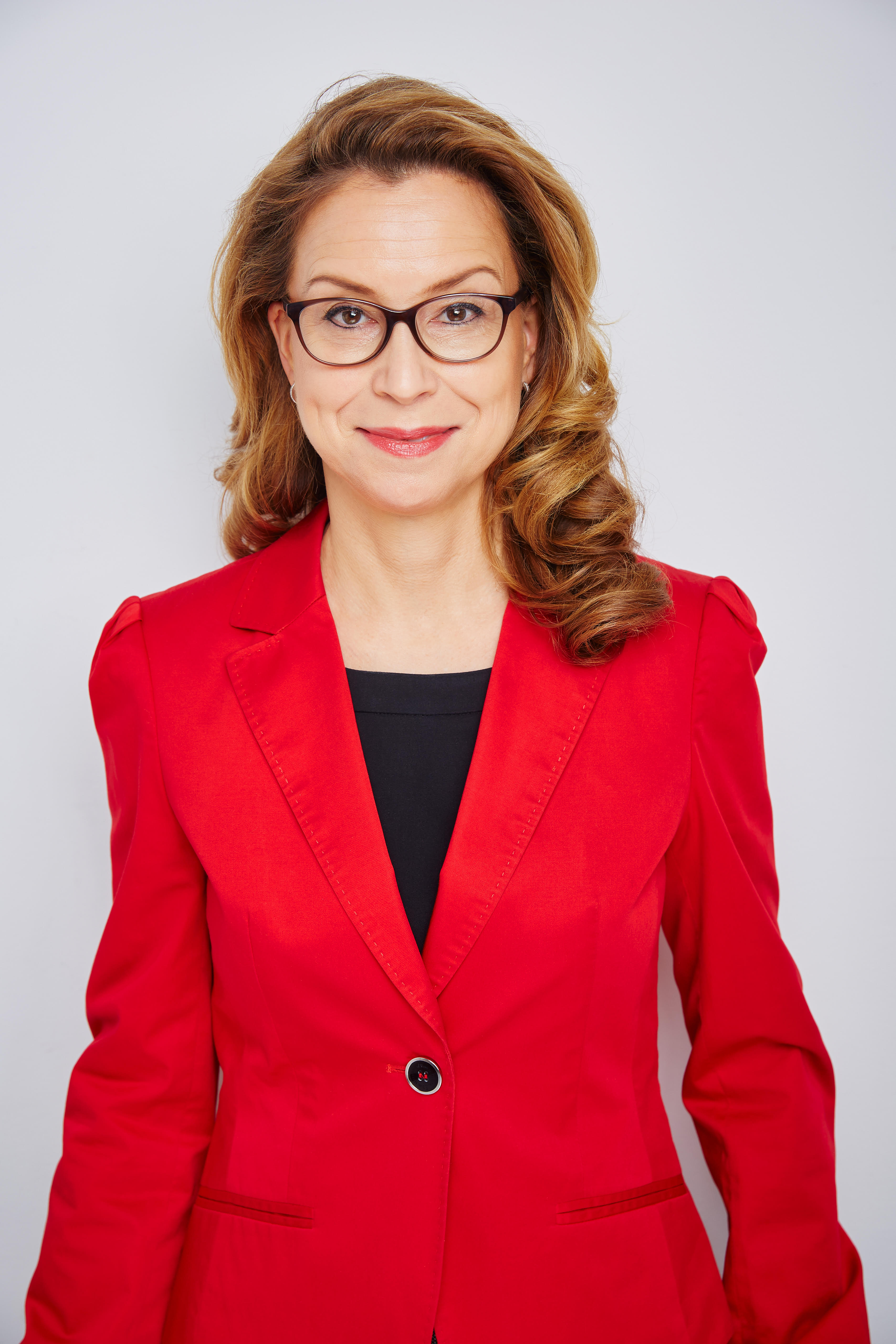
Veit in 2018

Carola Alexandra Veit (born 2 June 1973 in Hamburg) is a German lawyer and politician who has been president of the Hamburg Parliament since 23 March 2011.

== Early career ==
Having grown up in Hamburg's Billstedt district, Veit trained as a paralegal then a lawyer.

== Political career ==
Veit became a member of the SPD in 1991 and a member of the Hamburg Mitte District Board in 2000.

Since 2004, Veit has been a member of the Hamburg Parliament for the SPD. She has since been serving on several committees such as the Committee on Families, Children and Youth and the Committee on Constitutional Matters. In the 20th session of the parliament (2011–2015) she was elected President of the Hamburg Parliament. She was re-elected for a further term, 2015–2020, in the 21st session.

In the negotiations to form a Grand Coalition of Chancellor Angela Merkel's Christian Democrats (CDU together with the Bavarian CSU) and the SPD following the 2013 German elections, Veit was part of the SPD delegation in the working group on integration and migration, led by Maria Böhmer and Aydan Özoğuz.

In 2015, Veit was appointed Vice Chairman of the Baltic Sea Parliamentary Conference (BSPC). In 2016 she was appointed President of the BSPC. She was a SPD delegate to the Federal Convention for the purpose of electing the President of Germany in 2017 and in 2022.

== Other activities ==
- Herbert and Elsbeth Weichmann Foundation, deputy chairwoman of the Board of Trustees
- Jugend gegen AIDS, Member of the Advisory Board
- Kulturpalast Hamburg, Member of the Board of Trustees
- German United Services Trade Union (ver.di), Member
- FC St. Pauli, Member

== Personal life ==
Veit lives in a long-term relationship with an architect. The couple has three children and lives in Hamburg's Spadenland district.
