= 2024 Women's European U-19 Water Polo Championship =

Youth women's water polo tournament

Tournament details
- Host country: Croatia
- Venue: 1 (in 1 host city)
- Dates: 24–31 August 2024
- Teams: 16 (from 1 confederation)

Final positions
- Champions: Spain (3rd title)
- Runners-up: Hungary
- Third place: Greece
- Fourth place: Croatia

Tournament statistics
- Matches played: 51

The 2024 Women's European U-19 Water Polo Championship was the 15th edition of the Women's European U-19 Water Polo Championship. The tournament was played in Zagreb, Croatia from 24 to 31 August 2024. Spain were the two-time defending champions and successfully defended their title with a win over Hungary in the final.

== Host selection ==
Zagreb was given the hosting rights on 11 October 2023.

== Format ==
For the first time, the 16 teams are divided into two Divisions, based on the final standings of the previous edition. The top eight teams made Division 1 and the other eight teams Division 2. Both divisions were split into two groups of four teams. The top two teams from each group of Division 1 advanced directly to the quarterfinals, while the other two teams from each group played against one of the top two sides from each group in Division 2 in a play-off round. Starting with quarterfinals onward, the regular knock-out system was used.

== Qualification ==
Seventeen teams originally entered, but shortly before the tournament, Switzerland withdrew, bringing the total to 16. Due to the number of teams, no qualification process was needed and all 16 teams competed at the main event. Malta and Bulgaria enter after not participating in 2022, while Portugal, Serbia and Switzerland are the only countries to not return from 2022.

Event	Date	Location	Quotas	Nation(s)
Host	October 11 2023		1	Croatia
Participated in the 2022 European Championship	3–11 September 2022	(Israel) Netanya	14	Spain; Hungary; Greece; Netherlands; Italy; France; Israel; Ukraine; ~~Switzerland~~; Slovakia; Romania; Great Britain; Turkey; Germany
Didn't participate in 2022			2	Malta; Bulgaria

== Venue ==
After hosting the 2010 European Water Polo Championship and the 2024 Men's European Water Polo Championship, the Bazen Mladost hosted the competition.

Zagreb	2024 Women's European U-19 Water Polo Championship is located in Croatia
Bazen Mladost; Capacity: 2,000	2024 Women's European U-19 Water Polo Championship is located in Croatia

== Draw ==
The draw was held on 26 March 2024 in Barcelona, Spain.

Division 1

The pots for Division 1 were decided by the rankings of the 2022 U-19 European Championship.

Pot 1	Pot 2	Pot 3	Pot 4
Spain; Hungary	Greece; Netherlands	Italy; France	Israel; Croatia

Division 2

The teams who finished below the top eight at the previous championship or didn't participate in 2022 were placed in Division 2.

Pot 1	Pot 2
Ukraine; ~~Switzerland~~; Slovakia; Romania	Great Britain; Turkey; Germany; Malta; Bulgaria

== Preliminary round ==
All times are local (Central European Summer Time – UTC+2).

=== Division 1 ===
==== Group A ====
Pos	Team	Pld	W	PSW	PSL	L	GF	GA	GD	Pts	Qualification
1	Hungary	3	3	0	0	0	46	17	+29	9	Quarterfinals
2	Croatia (H)	3	2	0	0	1	39	34	+5	6	Quarterfinals
3	Greece	3	1	0	0	2	39	36	+3	3	Playoffs
4	France	3	0	0	0	3	24	61	−37	0	Playoffs

Source: LEN
Rules for classification: 1) points; 2) head-to-head points; 3) head-to-head goal difference; 4) head-to-head number of goals scored; 5) Goal difference.
(H) Host

25 August 2024; 10:30	Report	Greece	19–12	France	Bazen Mladost, Zagreb; Referees: Ralf Müller (GER), Berk Gunkut (TUR)
25 August 2024; 10:30	Report	Score by quarters: 7–2, 4–6, 6–4, 2–0			Bazen Mladost, Zagreb; Referees: Ralf Müller (GER), Berk Gunkut (TUR)

25 August 2024; 17:30	Report	Hungary	14–5	Croatia	Bazen Mladost, Zagreb; Referees: Giuliana Nicolosi (ITA), Sander Gransjean (NED)
25 August 2024; 17:30	Report	Score by quarters: 5–0, 3–2, 4–1, 2–2			Bazen Mladost, Zagreb; Referees: Giuliana Nicolosi (ITA), Sander Gransjean (NED)

26 August 2024; 10:30	Report	Hungary	10–7	Greece	Bazen Mladost, Zagreb; Referees: Giuliana Nicolosi (ITA), Maxim Gerasimov (GBR)
26 August 2024; 10:30	Report	Score by quarters: 2–2, 3–1, 2–3, 3–1			Bazen Mladost, Zagreb; Referees: Giuliana Nicolosi (ITA), Maxim Gerasimov (GBR)

26 August 2024; 17:30	Report	France	7–20	Croatia	Bazen Mladost, Zagreb; Referees: Ivanka Rakovic Krstonosic (SRB), Carla Martin (ESP)
26 August 2024; 17:30	Report	Score by quarters: 1–4, 1–6, 1–4, 4–6			Bazen Mladost, Zagreb; Referees: Ivanka Rakovic Krstonosic (SRB), Carla Martin (ESP)

27 August 2024; 16:00	Report	Hungary	22–5	France	Bazen Mladost, Zagreb; Referees: Sander Gransjean (NED), Maxim Gerasimov (GBR)
27 August 2024; 16:00	Report	Score by quarters: 5–1, 4–0, 5–1, 8–3			Bazen Mladost, Zagreb; Referees: Sander Gransjean (NED), Maxim Gerasimov (GBR)

27 August 2024; 17:30	Report	Greece	13–14	Croatia	Bazen Mladost, Zagreb; Referees: Ralf Mueller (GER), Neville Mercieca (MLT)
27 August 2024; 17:30	Report	Score by quarters: 5–5, 2–0, 1–3, 5–6			Bazen Mladost, Zagreb; Referees: Ralf Mueller (GER), Neville Mercieca (MLT)

==== Group B ====
Pos	Team	Pld	W	PSW	PSL	L	GF	GA	GD	Pts	Qualification
1	Spain	3	3	0	0	0	46	23	+23	9	Quarterfinals
2	Italy	3	2	0	0	1	37	26	+11	6	Quarterfinals
3	Netherlands	3	1	0	0	2	22	32	−10	3	Playoffs
4	Israel	3	0	0	0	3	17	41	−24	0	Playoffs

Source: LEN
Rules for classification: 1) points; 2) head-to-head points; 3) head-to-head goal difference; 4) head-to-head number of goals scored; 5) Goal difference.

25 August 2024; 12:00	Report	Italy	15–6	Israel	Bazen Mladost, Zagreb; Referees: Maxim Gerasimov (GBR), Neville Mercieca (MLT)
25 August 2024; 12:00	Report	Score by quarters: 4–3, 3–1, 4–1, 4–1			Bazen Mladost, Zagreb; Referees: Maxim Gerasimov (GBR), Neville Mercieca (MLT)

25 August 2024; 16:00	Report	Netherlands	8–14	Spain	Bazen Mladost, Zagreb; Referees: Martina Kunikova (SVK), Konstantinos Vasileiou (GRE)
25 August 2024; 16:00	Report	Score by quarters: 2–5, 1–3, 3–3, 2–3			Bazen Mladost, Zagreb; Referees: Martina Kunikova (SVK), Konstantinos Vasileiou (GRE)

26 August 2024; 12:00	Report	Spain	16–6	Israel	Bazen Mladost, Zagreb; Referees: Nikolett Sajben (HUN), Mihnea Ioan Alexandrescu (ROU)
26 August 2024; 12:00	Report	Score by quarters: 5–1, 5–3, 4–2, 2–0			Bazen Mladost, Zagreb; Referees: Nikolett Sajben (HUN), Mihnea Ioan Alexandrescu (ROU)

26 August 2024; 16:00	Report	Italy	13–4	Netherlands	Bazen Mladost, Zagreb; Referees: Ralf Müller (GER), Marko Matijevic (CRO)
26 August 2024; 16:00	Report	Score by quarters: 5–1, 3–1, 3–2, 2–0			Bazen Mladost, Zagreb; Referees: Ralf Müller (GER), Marko Matijevic (CRO)

27 August 2024; 10:30	Report	Italy	9–16	Spain	Bazen Mladost, Zagreb; Referees: Marko Matijevic (CRO), Konstantinos Vasileiou (GRE)
27 August 2024; 10:30	Report	Score by quarters: 1–6, 3–4, 2–3, 3–3			Bazen Mladost, Zagreb; Referees: Marko Matijevic (CRO), Konstantinos Vasileiou (GRE)

27 August 2024; 12:00	Report	Netherlands	10–5	Israel	Bazen Mladost, Zagreb; Referees: Martina Kunikova (SVK), George Makharadze (UKR)
27 August 2024; 12:00	Report	Score by quarters: 2–3, 3–0, 1–1, 4–1			Bazen Mladost, Zagreb; Referees: Martina Kunikova (SVK), George Makharadze (UKR)

=== Division 2 ===
==== Group C ====
Pos	Team	Pld	W	PSW	PSL	L	GF	GA	GD	Pts	Qualification
1	Slovakia	2	2	0	0	0	30	11	+19	6	Playoffs
2	Ukraine	2	1	0	0	1	15	19	−4	3	Playoffs
3	Romania	2	0	0	0	2	11	26	−15	0	13th–16th place classification
4	~~Switzerland~~	0	0	0	0	0	0	0	0	0	Withdrew

Source: LEN
Rules for classification: 1) points; 2) head-to-head points; 3) head-to-head goal difference; 4) head-to-head number of goals scored; 5) Goal difference.

25 August 2024; 9:00	Report	Slovakia	12–7	Ukraine	Bazen Mladost, Zagreb; Referees: Michaela Naneva (BUL), Jeremie Peden (FRA)
25 August 2024; 9:00	Report	Score by quarters: 4–1, 3–3, 3–1, 2–2			Bazen Mladost, Zagreb; Referees: Michaela Naneva (BUL), Jeremie Peden (FRA)

26 August 2024; 9:00	Report	Slovakia	18–4	Romania	Bazen Mladost, Zagreb
26 August 2024; 9:00	Report	Score by quarters: 6–2, 3–0, 5–1, 4–1			Bazen Mladost, Zagreb

27 August 2024; 9:00	Report	Romania	7–8	Ukraine	Bazen Mladost, Zagreb; Referees: Michaela Naneva (BUL), Berk Gunkut (TUR)
27 August 2024; 9:00	Report	Score by quarters: 1–1, 4–2, 1–3, 1–2			Bazen Mladost, Zagreb; Referees: Michaela Naneva (BUL), Berk Gunkut (TUR)

==== Group D ====
Pos	Team	Pld	W	PSW	PSL	L	GF	GA	GD	Pts	Qualification
1	Germany	4	3	1	0	0	53	29	+24	11	Playoffs
2	Great Britain	4	3	0	1	0	63	31	+32	10	Playoffs
3	Turkey	4	2	0	0	2	56	32	+24	6	13th–16th place classification
4	Malta	4	1	0	0	3	39	50	−11	3	13th–16th place classification
5	Bulgaria	4	0	0	0	4	21	90	−69	0	13th–16th place classification

Source: LEN
Rules for classification: 1) points; 2) head-to-head points; 3) head-to-head goal difference; 4) head-to-head number of goals scored; 5) Goal difference.

24 August 2024; 9:00	Report	Germany	10–7 (PSO)	Great Britain	Bazen Mladost, Zagreb; Referees: Nikolett Sajben (HUN), Giuliana Nicolosi (ITA)
24 August 2024; 9:00	Report	Score by quarters: 0–2, 3–2, 1–2, 2–0 PSO: 4–1			Bazen Mladost, Zagreb; Referees: Nikolett Sajben (HUN), Giuliana Nicolosi (ITA)

24 August 2024; 10:30	Report	Bulgaria	5–14	Malta	Bazen Mladost, Zagreb; Referees: Martina Kunikova (SVK), Jeremie Peden (FRA)
24 August 2024; 10:30	Report	Score by quarters: 0–1, 3–4, 1–5, 1–4			Bazen Mladost, Zagreb; Referees: Martina Kunikova (SVK), Jeremie Peden (FRA)

24 August 2024; 19:00	Report	Turkey	7–9	Germany	Bazen Mladost, Zagreb; Referees: Ivanka Rakovic Krstonosic (SRB), Carla Martin (ESP)
24 August 2024; 19:00	Report	Score by quarters: 1–2, 2–1, 1–4, 3–2			Bazen Mladost, Zagreb; Referees: Ivanka Rakovic Krstonosic (SRB), Carla Martin (ESP)

24 August 2024; 20:30	Report	Great Britain	32–6	Bulgaria	Bazen Mladost, Zagreb; Referees: Marko Matijevic (CRO), Sander Gransjean (NED)
24 August 2024; 20:30	Report	Score by quarters: 9–3, 8–1, 6–2, 9–0			Bazen Mladost, Zagreb; Referees: Marko Matijevic (CRO), Sander Gransjean (NED)

25 August 2024; 19:00	Report	Bulgaria	2–22	Turkey	Bazen Mladost, Zagreb; Referees: Ivanka Rakovic Krstonosic (SRB), Mihnea Ioan Alexandrescu (ROU)
25 August 2024; 19:00	Report	Score by quarters: 1–8, 1–5, 0–4, 0–5			Bazen Mladost, Zagreb; Referees: Ivanka Rakovic Krstonosic (SRB), Mihnea Ioan Alexandrescu (ROU)

25 August 2024; 20:30	Report	Malta	8–13	Great Britain	Bazen Mladost, Zagreb; Referees: George Makharadze (UKR), Marko Matijevic (CRO)
25 August 2024; 20:30	Report	Score by quarters: 1–4, 2–4, 4–1, 1–4			Bazen Mladost, Zagreb; Referees: George Makharadze (UKR), Marko Matijevic (CRO)

26 August 2024; 19:00	Report	Turkey	16–9	Malta	Bazen Mladost, Zagreb; Referees: Sander Gransjean (NED), George Makharadze (UKR)
26 August 2024; 19:00	Report	Score by quarters: 3–3, 6–1, 3–4, 4–1			Bazen Mladost, Zagreb; Referees: Sander Gransjean (NED), George Makharadze (UKR)

26 August 2024; 20:30	Report	Germany	22–8	Bulgaria	Bazen Mladost, Zagreb; Referees: Konstantinos Vasileiou (GRE), Jeremie Peden (FRA)
26 August 2024; 20:30	Report	Score by quarters: 4–4, 2–2, 8–0, 8–2			Bazen Mladost, Zagreb; Referees: Konstantinos Vasileiou (GRE), Jeremie Peden (FRA)

27 August 2024; 19:00	Report	Malta	8–16	Germany	Bazen Mladost, Zagreb
27 August 2024; 19:00	Report	Score by quarters: 1–3, 2–6, 2–5, 3–2			Bazen Mladost, Zagreb

27 August 2024; 20:30	Report	Turkey	11–12	Great Britain	Bazen Mladost, Zagreb
27 August 2024; 20:30	Report	Score by quarters: 2–2, 4–4, 2–4, 3–2			Bazen Mladost, Zagreb

== 13th–16th place classification ==
=== Group E ===
Pos	Team	Pld	W	PSW	PSL	L	GF	GA	GD	Pts
13	Turkey	3	3	0	0	0	43	24	+19	9
14	Romania	3	2	0	0	1	33	29	+4	6
15	Malta	3	1	0	0	2	45	35	+10	3
16	Bulgaria	3	0	0	0	3	19	52	−33	0

Source: LEN
Rules for classification: 1) points; 2) head-to-head points; 3) head-to-head goal difference; 4) head-to-head number of goals scored; 5) Goal difference.

28 August 2024; 9:00	Report	Romania	13–12	Malta	Bazen Mladost, Zagreb
28 August 2024; 9:00	Report	Score by quarters: 4–2, 3–2, 3–5, 3–3			Bazen Mladost, Zagreb

28 August 2024; 10:30	Report	Turkey	18–5	Bulgaria	Bazen Mladost, Zagreb
28 August 2024; 10:30	Report	Score by quarters: 4–0, 6–0, 4–3, 4–2			Bazen Mladost, Zagreb

29 August 2024; 9:00	Report	Turkey	12–7	Romania	Bazen Mladost, Zagreb; Referees: Konstantinos Vasileiou (GRE), George Makharadze (UKR)
29 August 2024; 9:00	Report	Score by quarters: 2–2, 5–0, 2–1, 3–4			Bazen Mladost, Zagreb; Referees: Konstantinos Vasileiou (GRE), George Makharadze (UKR)

29 August 2024; 10:30	Report	Malta	21–9	Bulgaria	Bazen Mladost, Zagreb; Referees: Sander Gransjean (NED), Maxim Gerasimov (GBR)
29 August 2024; 10:30	Report	Score by quarters: 5–3, 6–1, 6–4, 4–1			Bazen Mladost, Zagreb; Referees: Sander Gransjean (NED), Maxim Gerasimov (GBR)

30 August 2024; 9:00	Report	Bulgaria	5–13	Romania	Bazen Mladost, Zagreb; Referees: Neville Mercieca (MLT), Jeremie Peden (FRA)
30 August 2024; 9:00	Report	Score by quarters: 0–5, 2–5, 2–1, 1–2			Bazen Mladost, Zagreb; Referees: Neville Mercieca (MLT), Jeremie Peden (FRA)

30 August 2024; 10:30	Report	Malta	12–13	Turkey	Bazen Mladost, Zagreb; Referees: Giorgi Makharadze (UKR), Marko Matijevic (CRO)
30 August 2024; 10:30	Report	Score by quarters: 2–1, 4–5, 3–7, 3–0			Bazen Mladost, Zagreb; Referees: Giorgi Makharadze (UKR), Marko Matijevic (CRO)

== Knockout stage ==
=== Main bracket ===
Playoffs
28 August
France	12
Slovakia	9
28 August
Netherlands	14
Great Britain	5
28 August
Israel	15
Germany	10
28 August
Greece	21
Ukraine	3

Quarterfinals
29 August
Spain	20
France	6
29 August
Croatia	9
Netherlands	7
29 August
Hungary	16
Israel	9
29 August
Italy	6
Greece	15

Semifinals
30 August
Spain	12
Croatia	11
30 August
Hungary	10
Greece	8

Final
31 August
Spain	10
Hungary	9
Third place game
31 August
Croatia	8
Greece	18

=== Playoffs ===
28 August 2024; 16:00	Report	Israel	15–10	Germany	Bazen Mladost, Zagreb; Referees: Marko Matijevic (CRO), Carla Martin (ESP)
28 August 2024; 16:00	Report	Score by quarters: 3–2, 5–4, 3–1, 4–3			Bazen Mladost, Zagreb; Referees: Marko Matijevic (CRO), Carla Martin (ESP)

28 August 2024; 17:30	Report	France	12–9	Slovakia	Bazen Mladost, Zagreb; Referees: Nikolett Sajben (HUN), Mihnea Ioan Alexandrescu (ROU)
28 August 2024; 17:30	Report	Score by quarters: 3–0, 4–2, 2–2, 3–5			Bazen Mladost, Zagreb; Referees: Nikolett Sajben (HUN), Mihnea Ioan Alexandrescu (ROU)

28 August 2024; 19:00	Report	Netherlands	14–5	Great Britain	Bazen Mladost, Zagreb; Referees: Ralf Müller (GER), George Makharadze (UKR)
28 August 2024; 19:00	Report	Score by quarters: 6–2, 2–2, 5–1, 1–0			Bazen Mladost, Zagreb; Referees: Ralf Müller (GER), George Makharadze (UKR)

28 August 2024; 20:30	Report	Greece	21–3	Ukraine	Bazen Mladost, Zagreb; Referees: Ivanka Rakovic Krstonosic (SRB), Berk Gunkut (TUR)
28 August 2024; 20:30	Report	Score by quarters: 5–1, 5–1, 7–0, 4–1			Bazen Mladost, Zagreb; Referees: Ivanka Rakovic Krstonosic (SRB), Berk Gunkut (TUR)

=== 9th–12th place bracket ===
9th–12th place semifinals
29 August
Slovakia	14
Great Britain	15
29 August
Germany	13
Ukraine	3

Ninth place game
30 August
Great Britain	9
Germany	8
Eleventh place game
30 August
Slovakia	15
Ukraine	10

==== 9th–12th place semifinals ====
29 August 2024; 12:00	Report	Slovakia	14–15	Great Britain	Bazen Mladost, Zagreb; Referees: Marko Matijevic (CRO), Berk Gunkut (TUR)
29 August 2024; 12:00	Report	Score by quarters: 4–4, 4–4, 4–3, 2–4			Bazen Mladost, Zagreb; Referees: Marko Matijevic (CRO), Berk Gunkut (TUR)

29 August 2024; 13:30	Report	Germany	13–3	Ukraine	Bazen Mladost, Zagreb; Referees: Michaela Naneva (BUL), Jeremie Peden (FRA)
29 August 2024; 13:30	Report	Score by quarters: 3–0, 5–1, 3–2, 2–0			Bazen Mladost, Zagreb; Referees: Michaela Naneva (BUL), Jeremie Peden (FRA)

==== Eleventh place game ====
30 August 2024; 12:00	Report	Slovakia	15–10	Ukraine	Bazen Mladost, Zagreb; Referees: Michaela Naneva (BUL), Mihnea Ioan Alexandrescu (ROU)
30 August 2024; 12:00	Report	Score by quarters: 7–2, 2–3, 3–2, 3–3			Bazen Mladost, Zagreb; Referees: Michaela Naneva (BUL), Mihnea Ioan Alexandrescu (ROU)

==== Ninth place game ====
30 August 2024; 13:30	Report	Great Britain	9–8	Germany	Bazen Mladost, Zagreb; Referees: Ivanka Rakovic Krstonosic (SRB), Berk Gunkut (TUR)
30 August 2024; 13:30	Report	Score by quarters: 1–3, 4–2, 3–1, 1–2			Bazen Mladost, Zagreb; Referees: Ivanka Rakovic Krstonosic (SRB), Berk Gunkut (TUR)

=== Quarterfinals ===
29 August 2024; 16:00	Report	Hungary	16–9	Israel	Bazen Mladost, Zagreb
29 August 2024; 16:00	Report	Score by quarters: 5–1, 3–4, 3–1, 5–3			Bazen Mladost, Zagreb

29 August 2024; 17:30	Report	Spain	20–6	France	Bazen Mladost, Zagreb
29 August 2024; 17:30	Report	Score by quarters: 5–0, 3–2, 6–2, 6–2			Bazen Mladost, Zagreb

29 August 2024; 19:00	Report	Croatia	9–7	Netherlands	Bazen Mladost, Zagreb
29 August 2024; 19:00	Report	Score by quarters: 2–2, 2–2, 3–0, 2–3			Bazen Mladost, Zagreb

29 August 2024; 20:30	Report	Italy	6–15	Greece	Bazen Mladost, Zagreb
29 August 2024; 20:30	Report	Score by quarters: 1–6, 1–4, 1–4, 3–1			Bazen Mladost, Zagreb

=== 5th–8th place bracket ===
5th–8th place semifinals
30 August
France	7
Netherlands	10
30 August
Israel	7
Italy	13

Fifth place game
31 August
Netherlands	8
Italy	9
Seventh place game
31 August
France	10
Israel	14

==== 5th–8th place semifinals ====
30 August 2024; 16:00	Report	France	7–10	Netherlands	Bazen Mladost, Zagreb; Referees: Carla Martin (ESP), Ralf Müller (GER)
30 August 2024; 16:00	Report	Score by quarters: 3–3, 2–2, 2–1, 0–4			Bazen Mladost, Zagreb; Referees: Carla Martin (ESP), Ralf Müller (GER)

30 August 2024; 17:30	Report	Israel	7–13	Italy	Bazen Mladost, Zagreb; Referees: Nikolett Sajben (HUN), Konstantinos Vasileiou (GRE)
30 August 2024; 17:30	Report	Score by quarters: 2–3, 2–4, 2–4, 1–2			Bazen Mladost, Zagreb; Referees: Nikolett Sajben (HUN), Konstantinos Vasileiou (GRE)

==== Seventh place game ====
31 August 2024; 16:00	Report	France	10–14	Israel	Bazen Mladost, Zagreb; Referees: Konstantinos Vasileiou (GRE), Marko Matijevic (CRO)
31 August 2024; 16:00	Report	Score by quarters: 1–4, 3–4, 2–2, 4–4			Bazen Mladost, Zagreb; Referees: Konstantinos Vasileiou (GRE), Marko Matijevic (CRO)

==== Fifth place game ====
31 August 2024; 17:30	Report	Netherlands	8–9	Italy	Bazen Mladost, Zagreb; Referees: Carla Martin (ESP), Jeremie Peden (FRA)
31 August 2024; 17:30	Report	Score by quarters: 3–0, 2–4, 2–2, 1–3			Bazen Mladost, Zagreb; Referees: Carla Martin (ESP), Jeremie Peden (FRA)

=== Semifinals ===
30 August 2024; 19:00	Report	Spain	12–11	Croatia	Bazen Mladost, Zagreb; Referees: Giuliana Nicolosi (ITA), Maxim Gerasimov (GBR)
30 August 2024; 19:00	Report	Score by quarters: 6–4, 2–2, 3–2, 1–3			Bazen Mladost, Zagreb; Referees: Giuliana Nicolosi (ITA), Maxim Gerasimov (GBR)

30 August 2024; 20:30	Report	Hungary	10–8	Greece	Bazen Mladost, Zagreb; Referees: Martina Kunikova (SVK), Sander Gransjean (NED)
30 August 2024; 20:30	Report	Score by quarters: 2–3, 4–0, 3–2, 1–3			Bazen Mladost, Zagreb; Referees: Martina Kunikova (SVK), Sander Gransjean (NED)

=== Third place game ===
31 August 2024; 19:00	Report	Croatia	8–18	Greece	Bazen Mladost, Zagreb; Referees: Nikolett Sajben (HUN), Giuliana Nicolosi (ITA)
31 August 2024; 19:00	Report	Score by quarters: 4–6, 3–5, 1–5, 0–2			Bazen Mladost, Zagreb; Referees: Nikolett Sajben (HUN), Giuliana Nicolosi (ITA)

=== Final ===
31 August 2024; 20:30	Report	Spain	10–9	Hungary	Bazen Mladost, Zagreb
31 August 2024; 20:30	Report	Score by quarters: 5–3, 2–0, 2–1, 1–5			Bazen Mladost, Zagreb

== Final standings ==
Rank	Team
1st place, gold medalist(s)	Spain
2nd place, silver medalist(s)	Hungary
3rd place, bronze medalist(s)	Greece
4	Croatia
5	Italy
6	Netherlands
7	Israel
8	France
9	Great Britain
10	Germany
11	Slovakia
12	Ukraine
13	Turkey
14	Romania
15	Malta
16	Bulgaria
