= 2025 Men's European U-18 Water Polo Championship =

Youth men's water polo tournament

Tournament details
- Host country: Romania
- City: Oradea
- Venue: 1 (in 1 host city)
- Dates: 18–24 August 2025
- Teams: 16 (from 1 confederation)

Final positions
- Champions: Montenegro (3rd title)
- Runners-up: Serbia
- Third place: Greece
- Fourth place: Italy

Tournament statistics
- Matches played: 48
- Goals scored: 1,197 (24.94 per match)

Awards
- Best player: (Montenegro) Strahinja Gojković
- Best goalkeeper: (Montenegro) Marko Pejović

Official website
- European Aquatics

The 2025 Men's European U-18 Water Polo Championship was the 23rd edition of the Men's European U-18 Water Polo Championship, organized by the European Aquatics. The tournament was played in Oradea, Romania from 18 to 24 August 2025. Starting this edition, the age level has changed from U17 to U18. Greece were the defending champions; Montenegro became the European champions for the third time.

== Host selection ==
Oradea was given the hosting rights on 13 November 2024.

== Participating teams ==
No qualification round took place; the sixteen teams that took part in the 2023 edition automatically qualified for the championship while the remaining registered teams compete in the newly formed Division I.

Teams
Greece (1st)
Serbia (2nd)
Spain (3rd)
Hungary (4th)
Montenegro (5th)
Italy (6th)
Croatia (7th)
Netherlands (8th)
Turkey (9th)
Germany (10th)
Malta (11th)
France (12th)
Romania (13th)
Georgia (14th)
Ukraine (15th)
Poland (16th)

== Venue ==
2025 Men's European U-18 Water Polo Championship is located in Romania	Oradea
2025 Men's European U-18 Water Polo Championship is located in Romania	“Ioan Alexandrescu” Swimming Pool
2025 Men's European U-18 Water Polo Championship is located in Romania	Capacity: 850

== Draw ==
The draw was held on 7 February 2025 at 10:30 CET in Zagreb, Croatia. The seeding was based on the results of the previous edition.

Sub-division 1

Pot 1	Pot 2	Pot 3	Pot 4
Greece; Serbia	Spain; Hungary	Montenegro; Italy	Croatia; Netherlands

Sub-division 2

Pot 5	Pot 6	Pot 7	Pot 8
Turkey; Germany	Malta; France	Romania; Georgia	Ukraine; Poland

== Preliminary round ==
The schedule was announced on 6 August 2025.

All times are local (Eastern European Summer Time; UTC+3).

=== Sub-division 1 ===
==== Group A ====
Pos	Team	Pld	W	PSW	PSL	L	GF	GA	GD	Pts	Qualification
1	Hungary	3	3	0	0	0	46	35	+11	9	Quarterfinals
2	Italy	3	2	0	0	1	41	32	+9	6	Quarterfinals
3	Greece	3	1	0	0	2	38	46	−8	3	Crossovers
4	Netherlands	3	0	0	0	3	35	47	−12	0	Crossovers

Source: Men's European U-18 Water Polo Championship
Rules for classification: 1) points; 2) head-to-head points; 3) head-to-head goal difference; 4) head-to-head number of goals scored; 5) Goal difference.

18 August 2025; 13:30	Report	Greece	9–14	Italy	“Ioan Alexandrescu” Swimming Pool, Oradea; Referees: Jakov Blaskovic (CRO), Pau Segurana (ESP)
18 August 2025; 13:30	Report	Score by quarters: 1–4, 2–4, 4–3, 2–3			“Ioan Alexandrescu” Swimming Pool, Oradea; Referees: Jakov Blaskovic (CRO), Pau Segurana (ESP)
18 August 2025; 13:30	Report	Chatzis 5	Goals	Chianese 4	“Ioan Alexandrescu” Swimming Pool, Oradea; Referees: Jakov Blaskovic (CRO), Pau Segurana (ESP)

18 August 2025; 16:00	Report	Hungary	15–11	Netherlands	“Ioan Alexandrescu” Swimming Pool, Oradea; Referees: Julien Bourges (FRA), Mihnea Ioan Alexandrescu (ROU)
18 August 2025; 16:00	Report	Score by quarters: 4–3, 4–2, 2–2, 5–4			“Ioan Alexandrescu” Swimming Pool, Oradea; Referees: Julien Bourges (FRA), Mihnea Ioan Alexandrescu (ROU)
18 August 2025; 16:00	Report	Benedek 4	Goals	Jukic 4	“Ioan Alexandrescu” Swimming Pool, Oradea; Referees: Julien Bourges (FRA), Mihnea Ioan Alexandrescu (ROU)

19 August 2025; 17:30	Report	Netherlands	11–16	Italy	“Ioan Alexandrescu” Swimming Pool, Oradea; Referees: Levan Berishvili (GEO), Sinisa Matijasevic (MNE)
19 August 2025; 17:30	Report	Score by quarters: 3–4, 2–1, 3–4, 3–7			“Ioan Alexandrescu” Swimming Pool, Oradea; Referees: Levan Berishvili (GEO), Sinisa Matijasevic (MNE)
19 August 2025; 17:30	Report	Jukic 4	Goals	Costanzo 4	“Ioan Alexandrescu” Swimming Pool, Oradea; Referees: Levan Berishvili (GEO), Sinisa Matijasevic (MNE)

19 August 2025; 20:30	Report	Greece	13–19	Hungary	“Ioan Alexandrescu” Swimming Pool, Oradea; Referees: Lazar Andjelic (SRB), Ralf Mueller (GER)
19 August 2025; 20:30	Report	Score by quarters: 5–3, 4–6, 3–5, 1–5			“Ioan Alexandrescu” Swimming Pool, Oradea; Referees: Lazar Andjelic (SRB), Ralf Mueller (GER)
19 August 2025; 20:30	Report	Chatzis 4	Goals	Benedek 6	“Ioan Alexandrescu” Swimming Pool, Oradea; Referees: Lazar Andjelic (SRB), Ralf Mueller (GER)

20 August 2025; 17:30	Report	Greece	16–13	Netherlands	“Ioan Alexandrescu” Swimming Pool, Oradea; Referees: Pau Segurana (ESP), George Makharadze (UKR)
20 August 2025; 17:30	Report	Score by quarters: 4–3, 4–0, 5–6, 3–4			“Ioan Alexandrescu” Swimming Pool, Oradea; Referees: Pau Segurana (ESP), George Makharadze (UKR)
20 August 2025; 17:30	Report	Angelopoulos 6	Goals	Jukic 6	“Ioan Alexandrescu” Swimming Pool, Oradea; Referees: Pau Segurana (ESP), George Makharadze (UKR)

20 August 2025; 20:30	Report	Hungary	12–11	Italy	“Ioan Alexandrescu” Swimming Pool, Oradea; Referees: Sinisa Matijasevic (MNE), Jakov Blaskovic (CRO)
20 August 2025; 20:30	Report	Score by quarters: 3–4, 4–2, 3–5, 2–0			“Ioan Alexandrescu” Swimming Pool, Oradea; Referees: Sinisa Matijasevic (MNE), Jakov Blaskovic (CRO)
20 August 2025; 20:30	Report	Benedek, Cseh 3	Goals	Costanzo, Tresa 4	“Ioan Alexandrescu” Swimming Pool, Oradea; Referees: Sinisa Matijasevic (MNE), Jakov Blaskovic (CRO)

==== Group B ====
Pos	Team	Pld	W	PSW	PSL	L	GF	GA	GD	Pts	Qualification
1	Montenegro	3	3	0	0	0	35	28	+7	9	Quarterfinals
2	Croatia	3	1	1	0	1	31	32	−1	5	Quarterfinals
3	Spain	3	1	0	1	1	37	32	+5	4	Crossovers
4	Serbia	3	0	0	0	3	24	35	−11	0	Crossovers

Source: Men's European U-18 Water Polo Championship
Rules for classification: 1) points; 2) head-to-head points; 3) head-to-head goal difference; 4) head-to-head number of goals scored; 5) Goal difference.

18 August 2025; 17:30	Report	Serbia	8–9	Montenegro	“Ioan Alexandrescu” Swimming Pool, Oradea; Referees: Nikolaos Boudramis (GRE), Ralf Mueller (GER)
18 August 2025; 17:30	Report	Score by quarters: 3–2, 1–3, 1–3, 3–1			“Ioan Alexandrescu” Swimming Pool, Oradea; Referees: Nikolaos Boudramis (GRE), Ralf Mueller (GER)
18 August 2025; 17:30	Report	Canepa, Neskovic 2	Goals	Moracanin 3	“Ioan Alexandrescu” Swimming Pool, Oradea; Referees: Nikolaos Boudramis (GRE), Ralf Mueller (GER)

18 August 2025; 20:30	Report	Spain	14–16 (PSO)	Croatia	“Ioan Alexandrescu” Swimming Pool, Oradea; Referees: Peter de Jong (NED), Norbert Ercse (HUN)
18 August 2025; 20:30	Report	Score by quarters: 3–3, 3–4, 2–1, 3–3 PSO: 3–5			“Ioan Alexandrescu” Swimming Pool, Oradea; Referees: Peter de Jong (NED), Norbert Ercse (HUN)
18 August 2025; 20:30	Report	Solar Roizarena 3	Goals	Jerkovic 4	“Ioan Alexandrescu” Swimming Pool, Oradea; Referees: Peter de Jong (NED), Norbert Ercse (HUN)

19 August 2025; 13:30	Report	Croatia	7–12	Montenegro	“Ioan Alexandrescu” Swimming Pool, Oradea; Referees: Nikolaos Boudramis (GRE), Kukasz Krol (POL)
19 August 2025; 13:30	Report	Score by quarters: 3–4, 1–2, 1–2, 2–4			“Ioan Alexandrescu” Swimming Pool, Oradea; Referees: Nikolaos Boudramis (GRE), Kukasz Krol (POL)
19 August 2025; 13:30	Report	Dujmic 3	Goals	Stupar 3	“Ioan Alexandrescu” Swimming Pool, Oradea; Referees: Nikolaos Boudramis (GRE), Kukasz Krol (POL)

19 August 2025; 16:00	Report	Serbia	7–13	Spain	“Ioan Alexandrescu” Swimming Pool, Oradea; Referees: Bruno Navarra (ITA), Julien Bourges (FRA)
19 August 2025; 16:00	Report	Score by quarters: 3–2, 2–2, 1–4, 1–5			“Ioan Alexandrescu” Swimming Pool, Oradea; Referees: Bruno Navarra (ITA), Julien Bourges (FRA)
19 August 2025; 16:00	Report	Conkic, Urosevic 2	Goals	Comabella Cives 4	“Ioan Alexandrescu” Swimming Pool, Oradea; Referees: Bruno Navarra (ITA), Julien Bourges (FRA)

20 August 2025; 13:30	Report	Serbia	9–13	Croatia	“Ioan Alexandrescu” Swimming Pool, Oradea; Referees: Nikolaos Boudramis (GRE), Peter de Jong (NED)
20 August 2025; 13:30	Report	Score by quarters: 3–5, 2–4, 1–3, 3–1			“Ioan Alexandrescu” Swimming Pool, Oradea; Referees: Nikolaos Boudramis (GRE), Peter de Jong (NED)
20 August 2025; 13:30	Report	Lazic, Zelic 3	Goals	Susic 6	“Ioan Alexandrescu” Swimming Pool, Oradea; Referees: Nikolaos Boudramis (GRE), Peter de Jong (NED)

20 August 2025; 16:00	Report	Spain	13–14	Montenegro	“Ioan Alexandrescu” Swimming Pool, Oradea; Referees: Bruno Navarra (ITA), Mihnea Ioan Alexandrescu (ROU)
20 August 2025; 16:00	Report	Score by quarters: 3–4, 4–4, 4–3, 2–3			“Ioan Alexandrescu” Swimming Pool, Oradea; Referees: Bruno Navarra (ITA), Mihnea Ioan Alexandrescu (ROU)
20 August 2025; 16:00	Report	Millan Martin 3	Goals	Gojković 4	“Ioan Alexandrescu” Swimming Pool, Oradea; Referees: Bruno Navarra (ITA), Mihnea Ioan Alexandrescu (ROU)

=== Sub-division 2 ===
==== Group C ====
Pos	Team	Pld	W	PSW	PSL	L	GF	GA	GD	Pts	Qualification
1	France	3	3	0	0	0	51	27	+24	9	Crossovers
2	Poland	3	1	0	0	2	34	49	−15	3 (Note: HTH: Poland 1–1, +2 GD; Romania 1–1, ±0 GD; Turkey 1–1, −2 GD.)	Crossovers
3	Romania (H)	3	1	0	0	2	31	37	−6	3	13th–16th place semifinals
4	Turkey	3	1	0	0	2	33	36	−3	3	13th–16th place semifinals

Source: Men's European U-18 Water Polo Championship
Rules for classification: 1) points; 2) head-to-head points; 3) head-to-head goal difference; 4) head-to-head number of goals scored; 5) Goal difference.
(H) Host
Notes:

18 August 2025; 09:00	Report	France	26–9	Poland	“Ioan Alexandrescu” Swimming Pool, Oradea; Referees: Massimo Angileri (ITA), George Makharadze (UKR)
18 August 2025; 09:00	Report	Score by quarters: 5–3, 8–2, 8–3, 5–1			“Ioan Alexandrescu” Swimming Pool, Oradea; Referees: Massimo Angileri (ITA), George Makharadze (UKR)
18 August 2025; 09:00	Report	Novecek 5	Goals	Greif 3	“Ioan Alexandrescu” Swimming Pool, Oradea; Referees: Massimo Angileri (ITA), George Makharadze (UKR)

18 August 2025; 19:00	Report	Turkey	12–11	Romania	“Ioan Alexandrescu” Swimming Pool, Oradea; Referees: Lazar Andjelic (SRB), Levan Berishvili (GEO)
18 August 2025; 19:00	Report	Score by quarters: 2–3, 3–1, 3–5, 4–2			“Ioan Alexandrescu” Swimming Pool, Oradea; Referees: Lazar Andjelic (SRB), Levan Berishvili (GEO)
18 August 2025; 19:00	Report	Gulsoy 4	Goals	Feke 5	“Ioan Alexandrescu” Swimming Pool, Oradea; Referees: Lazar Andjelic (SRB), Levan Berishvili (GEO)

19 August 2025; 12:00	Report	Turkey	10–11	France	“Ioan Alexandrescu” Swimming Pool, Oradea; Referees: Jakov Blaskovic (CRO), Massimo Angileri (MLT)
19 August 2025; 12:00	Report	Score by quarters: 4–4, 2–3, 2–3, 2–1			“Ioan Alexandrescu” Swimming Pool, Oradea; Referees: Jakov Blaskovic (CRO), Massimo Angileri (MLT)
19 August 2025; 12:00	Report	Yildaz 5	Goals	Braise Fernandez 5	“Ioan Alexandrescu” Swimming Pool, Oradea; Referees: Jakov Blaskovic (CRO), Massimo Angileri (MLT)

19 August 2025; 19:00	Report	Poland	11–12	Romania	“Ioan Alexandrescu” Swimming Pool, Oradea; Referees: Pau Segurana (ESP), George Makharadze (UKR)
19 August 2025; 19:00	Report	Score by quarters: 4–3, 2–3, 2–3, 3–3			“Ioan Alexandrescu” Swimming Pool, Oradea; Referees: Pau Segurana (ESP), George Makharadze (UKR)
19 August 2025; 19:00	Report	Greif, Janicki 3	Goals	Cojocariu, Rosan 3	“Ioan Alexandrescu” Swimming Pool, Oradea; Referees: Pau Segurana (ESP), George Makharadze (UKR)

20 August 2025; 09:00	Report	Turkey	11–14	Poland	“Ioan Alexandrescu” Swimming Pool, Oradea; Referees: Levan Berishvili (GEO), Massimo Angileri (MLT)
20 August 2025; 09:00	Report	Score by quarters: 2–1, 3–5, 2–3, 4–5			“Ioan Alexandrescu” Swimming Pool, Oradea; Referees: Levan Berishvili (GEO), Massimo Angileri (MLT)
20 August 2025; 09:00	Report	three players 2	Goals	Janicki 3	“Ioan Alexandrescu” Swimming Pool, Oradea; Referees: Levan Berishvili (GEO), Massimo Angileri (MLT)

20 August 2025; 19:00	Report	France	14–8	Romania	“Ioan Alexandrescu” Swimming Pool, Oradea; Referees: Ralf Mueller (GER), Lazar Andjelic (SRB)
20 August 2025; 19:00	Report	Score by quarters: 1–3, 5–0, 5–2, 3–3			“Ioan Alexandrescu” Swimming Pool, Oradea; Referees: Ralf Mueller (GER), Lazar Andjelic (SRB)
20 August 2025; 19:00	Report	Agrefilo 5	Goals	eight players 1	“Ioan Alexandrescu” Swimming Pool, Oradea; Referees: Ralf Mueller (GER), Lazar Andjelic (SRB)

==== Group D ====
Pos	Team	Pld	W	PSW	PSL	L	GF	GA	GD	Pts	Qualification
1	Malta	3	2	1	0	0	48	25	+23	8	Crossovers
2	Germany	3	2	0	1	0	44	27	+17	7	Crossovers
3	Georgia	3	1	0	0	2	33	35	−2	3	13th–16th place semifinals
4	Ukraine	3	0	0	0	3	22	60	−38	0	13th–16th place semifinals

Source: Men's European U-18 Water Polo Championship
Rules for classification: 1) points; 2) head-to-head points; 3) head-to-head goal difference; 4) head-to-head number of goals scored; 5) Goal difference.

18 August 2025; 10:30	Report	Germany	14–8	Georgia	“Ioan Alexandrescu” Swimming Pool, Oradea; Referees: Bruno Navarra (ITA), Lukasz Krol (POL)
18 August 2025; 10:30	Report	Score by quarters: 5–1, 5–2, 3–0, 1–5			“Ioan Alexandrescu” Swimming Pool, Oradea; Referees: Bruno Navarra (ITA), Lukasz Krol (POL)
18 August 2025; 10:30	Report	Hofmann 5	Goals	Avesadze 3	“Ioan Alexandrescu” Swimming Pool, Oradea; Referees: Bruno Navarra (ITA), Lukasz Krol (POL)

18 August 2025; 12:00	Report	Malta	24–6	Ukraine	“Ioan Alexandrescu” Swimming Pool, Oradea; Referees: Sinisa Matijasevic (MNE), Berk Gunkut (TUR)
18 August 2025; 12:00	Report	Score by quarters: 6–1, 6–4, 4–1, 8–0			“Ioan Alexandrescu” Swimming Pool, Oradea; Referees: Sinisa Matijasevic (MNE), Berk Gunkut (TUR)
18 August 2025; 12:00	Report	Chircop, Cutajar 5	Goals	Yarema 2	“Ioan Alexandrescu” Swimming Pool, Oradea; Referees: Sinisa Matijasevic (MNE), Berk Gunkut (TUR)

19 August 2025; 09:00	Report	Ukraine	8–17	Georgia	“Ioan Alexandrescu” Swimming Pool, Oradea; Referees: Norbert Ercse (HUN), Berk Gunkut (TUR)
19 August 2025; 09:00	Report	Score by quarters: 3–3, 1–5, 1–6, 3–3			“Ioan Alexandrescu” Swimming Pool, Oradea; Referees: Norbert Ercse (HUN), Berk Gunkut (TUR)
19 August 2025; 09:00	Report	Rudnyk 2	Goals	Mchedlishvili 5	“Ioan Alexandrescu” Swimming Pool, Oradea; Referees: Norbert Ercse (HUN), Berk Gunkut (TUR)

19 August 2025; 10:30	Report	Germany	20–21 (PSO)	Malta	“Ioan Alexandrescu” Swimming Pool, Oradea; Referees: Peter de Jong (NED), Mihnea Ioan Alexandrescu (ROU)
19 August 2025; 10:30	Report	Score by quarters: 1–2, 4–2, 4–4, 2–3 PSO: 9–10			“Ioan Alexandrescu” Swimming Pool, Oradea; Referees: Peter de Jong (NED), Mihnea Ioan Alexandrescu (ROU)
19 August 2025; 10:30	Report	Mityska 3	Goals	Chircop, Cutajar 4	“Ioan Alexandrescu” Swimming Pool, Oradea; Referees: Peter de Jong (NED), Mihnea Ioan Alexandrescu (ROU)

20 August 2025; 10:30	Report	Germany	19–8	Ukraine	“Ioan Alexandrescu” Swimming Pool, Oradea; Referees: Berk Gunkut (TUR), Kukasz Krol (POL)
20 August 2025; 10:30	Report	Score by quarters: 5–0, 6–4, 4–1, 4–3			“Ioan Alexandrescu” Swimming Pool, Oradea; Referees: Berk Gunkut (TUR), Kukasz Krol (POL)
20 August 2025; 10:30	Report	Kugler 5	Goals	Tischenko 2	“Ioan Alexandrescu” Swimming Pool, Oradea; Referees: Berk Gunkut (TUR), Kukasz Krol (POL)

20 August 2025; 12:00	Report	Malta	13–8	Georgia	“Ioan Alexandrescu” Swimming Pool, Oradea; Referees: Norbert Ercse (HUN), Julien Bourges (FRA)
20 August 2025; 12:00	Report	Score by quarters: 3–3, 3–2, 4–0, 3–3			“Ioan Alexandrescu” Swimming Pool, Oradea; Referees: Norbert Ercse (HUN), Julien Bourges (FRA)
20 August 2025; 12:00	Report	four players 2	Goals	Veshaguri 4	“Ioan Alexandrescu” Swimming Pool, Oradea; Referees: Norbert Ercse (HUN), Julien Bourges (FRA)

== Brackets ==
=== Main bracket ===
Crossovers
21 August
A4 Netherlands	11
C1 France	12
21 August
B3 Spain	14
D2 Germany	7
21 August
A3 Greece	21
C2 Poland	12
21 August
B4 Serbia	18
D1 Malta	13

Quarterfinals
22 August
B1 Montenegro	21
C1 France	11
22 August
A2 Italy	11
B3 Spain	6
22 August
B2 Croatia	16
A3 Greece	17
22 August
A1 Hungary	13
B4 Serbia	14

Semifinals
23 August
B1 Montenegro	10
A2 Italy	6
23 August
A3 Greece	14
B4 Serbia	20

Final
24 August
B1 Montenegro	13
B4 Serbia	9
Third place game
24 August
A2 Italy	11
A3 Greece	12

=== 5th place bracket ===
5th–8th place semifinals
23 August
C1 France	11
B3 Spain	16
23 August
B2 Croatia	14
A1 Hungary	18

Fifth place game
24 August
B3 Spain	10
A1 Hungary	7
Seventh place game
24 August
C1 France	7
B2 Croatia	16

=== 9th place bracket ===
9th–12th place semifinals
22 August
A4 Netherlands	8
D2 Germany	13
22 August
C2 Poland	14
D1 Malta	15

Ninth place game
23 August
D2 Germany	16
D1 Malta	17
Eleventh place game
23 August
A4 Netherlands	18
C2 Poland	7

=== 13th place bracket ===
13th–16th place semifinals
21 August
D3 Georgia	8
C4 Turkey	11
21 August
D4 Ukraine	12
C3 Romania	16

Thirteenth place game
22 August
C4 Turkey	9
C3 Romania	8
Fifteenth place game
22 August
D3 Georgia	17
D4 Ukraine	14

== Knockout stage ==
=== 13th–16th place semifinals ===
21 August 2025; 9:00	Report	Georgia	8–11	Turkey	“Ioan Alexandrescu” Swimming Pool, Oradea; Referees: Nikolaos Boudramis (GRE), Julien Bourges (FRA)
21 August 2025; 9:00	Report	Score by quarters: 2–4, 2–1, 2–3, 2–3			“Ioan Alexandrescu” Swimming Pool, Oradea; Referees: Nikolaos Boudramis (GRE), Julien Bourges (FRA)
21 August 2025; 9:00	Report	Mchedlishvili, Veshaguri 2	Goals	Caliskan 5	“Ioan Alexandrescu” Swimming Pool, Oradea; Referees: Nikolaos Boudramis (GRE), Julien Bourges (FRA)

21 August 2025; 10:30	Report	Ukraine	12–16	Romania	“Ioan Alexandrescu” Swimming Pool, Oradea; Referees: Norbert Ercse (HUN), Massimo Angileri (MLT)
21 August 2025; 10:30	Report	Score by quarters: 1–3, 0–6, 6–4, 5–3			“Ioan Alexandrescu” Swimming Pool, Oradea; Referees: Norbert Ercse (HUN), Massimo Angileri (MLT)
21 August 2025; 10:30	Report	Zinkevych 4	Goals	Feke, Paladiciuc 4	“Ioan Alexandrescu” Swimming Pool, Oradea; Referees: Norbert Ercse (HUN), Massimo Angileri (MLT)

==== Fifteenth place game ====
22 August 2025; 9:00	Report	Georgia	17–14	Ukraine	“Ioan Alexandrescu” Swimming Pool, Oradea; Referees: Lukasz Krol (POL), Mihnea Ioan Alexandrescu (ROU)
22 August 2025; 9:00	Report	Score by quarters: 4–1, 4–4, 3–4, 6–5			“Ioan Alexandrescu” Swimming Pool, Oradea; Referees: Lukasz Krol (POL), Mihnea Ioan Alexandrescu (ROU)
22 August 2025; 9:00	Report	Khurtsilava 8	Goals	Zinkevych 5	“Ioan Alexandrescu” Swimming Pool, Oradea; Referees: Lukasz Krol (POL), Mihnea Ioan Alexandrescu (ROU)

==== Thirteenth place game ====
22 August 2025; 10:30	Report	Turkey	9–8	Romania	“Ioan Alexandrescu” Swimming Pool, Oradea; Referees: Bruno Navarra (ITA), Sinisa Matijasevic (MNE)
22 August 2025; 10:30	Report	Score by quarters: 1–0, 2–4, 5–2, 1–2			“Ioan Alexandrescu” Swimming Pool, Oradea; Referees: Bruno Navarra (ITA), Sinisa Matijasevic (MNE)
22 August 2025; 10:30	Report	Caliskan 3	Goals	three players 2	“Ioan Alexandrescu” Swimming Pool, Oradea; Referees: Bruno Navarra (ITA), Sinisa Matijasevic (MNE)

=== Crossovers ===
21 August 2025; 16:00	Report	Netherlands	11–12	France	“Ioan Alexandrescu” Swimming Pool, Oradea; Referees: Bruno Navarra (ITA), Lukasz Krol (POL)
21 August 2025; 16:00	Report	Score by quarters: 2–1, 1–3, 3–5, 5–3			“Ioan Alexandrescu” Swimming Pool, Oradea; Referees: Bruno Navarra (ITA), Lukasz Krol (POL)
21 August 2025; 16:00	Report	De Zwart 3	Goals	Agrefilo 4	“Ioan Alexandrescu” Swimming Pool, Oradea; Referees: Bruno Navarra (ITA), Lukasz Krol (POL)

21 August 2025; 17:30	Report	Greece	21–12	Poland	“Ioan Alexandrescu” Swimming Pool, Oradea; Referees: Sinisa Matijasevic (MNE), Mihnea Ioan Alexandrescu (ROU)
21 August 2025; 17:30	Report	Score by quarters: 5–2, 3–2, 5–3, 8–5			“Ioan Alexandrescu” Swimming Pool, Oradea; Referees: Sinisa Matijasevic (MNE), Mihnea Ioan Alexandrescu (ROU)
21 August 2025; 17:30	Report	Angelopoulos 6	Goals	Greif 4	“Ioan Alexandrescu” Swimming Pool, Oradea; Referees: Sinisa Matijasevic (MNE), Mihnea Ioan Alexandrescu (ROU)

21 August 2025; 19:00	Report	Serbia	18–13	Malta	“Ioan Alexandrescu” Swimming Pool, Oradea; Referees: Pau Segurana (ESP), Levan Berishvili (GEO)
21 August 2025; 19:00	Report	Score by quarters: 3–2, 7–2, 4–2, 4–7			“Ioan Alexandrescu” Swimming Pool, Oradea; Referees: Pau Segurana (ESP), Levan Berishvili (GEO)
21 August 2025; 19:00	Report	Canepa 4	Goals	Dimech 5	“Ioan Alexandrescu” Swimming Pool, Oradea; Referees: Pau Segurana (ESP), Levan Berishvili (GEO)

21 August 2025; 20:30	Report	Spain	14–7	Germany	“Ioan Alexandrescu” Swimming Pool, Oradea; Referees: Peter de Jong (NED), Jakov Blaskovic (CRO)
21 August 2025; 20:30	Report	Score by quarters: 3–1, 3–2, 4–0, 4–4			“Ioan Alexandrescu” Swimming Pool, Oradea; Referees: Peter de Jong (NED), Jakov Blaskovic (CRO)
21 August 2025; 20:30	Report	Comabella Cives, Solar Roizarena 3	Goals	Scherrieble 2	“Ioan Alexandrescu” Swimming Pool, Oradea; Referees: Peter de Jong (NED), Jakov Blaskovic (CRO)

=== 9th–12th place semifinals ===
22 August 2025; 12:00	Report	Netherlands	8–13	Germany	“Ioan Alexandrescu” Swimming Pool, Oradea; Referees: Massimo Angileri (ITA), Berk Gunkut (TUR)
22 August 2025; 12:00	Report	Score by quarters: 1–1, 3–4, 2–3, 2–5			“Ioan Alexandrescu” Swimming Pool, Oradea; Referees: Massimo Angileri (ITA), Berk Gunkut (TUR)
22 August 2025; 12:00	Report	Hageman, Jukic 3	Goals	Hofmann 5	“Ioan Alexandrescu” Swimming Pool, Oradea; Referees: Massimo Angileri (ITA), Berk Gunkut (TUR)

22 August 2025; 13:30	Report	Poland	14–15 (PSO)	Malta	“Ioan Alexandrescu” Swimming Pool, Oradea; Referees: Ralf Mueller (GER), George Makharadze (UKR)
22 August 2025; 13:30	Report	Score by quarters: 3–3, 2–1, 2–3, 2–2 PSO: 5–6			“Ioan Alexandrescu” Swimming Pool, Oradea; Referees: Ralf Mueller (GER), George Makharadze (UKR)
22 August 2025; 13:30	Report	Janicki 3	Goals	Chircop 4	“Ioan Alexandrescu” Swimming Pool, Oradea; Referees: Ralf Mueller (GER), George Makharadze (UKR)

==== Eleventh place game ====
23 August 2025; 9:00	Report	Netherlands	18–7	Poland	“Ioan Alexandrescu” Swimming Pool, Oradea; Referees: Pau Segurana (ESP), Berk Gunkut (TUR)
23 August 2025; 9:00	Report	Score by quarters: 2–1, 7–2, 3–2, 6–2			“Ioan Alexandrescu” Swimming Pool, Oradea; Referees: Pau Segurana (ESP), Berk Gunkut (TUR)
23 August 2025; 9:00	Report	Jukic 4	Goals	three players 2	“Ioan Alexandrescu” Swimming Pool, Oradea; Referees: Pau Segurana (ESP), Berk Gunkut (TUR)

==== Ninth place game ====
23 August 2025; 10:30	Report	Germany	16–17 (PSO)	Malta	“Ioan Alexandrescu” Swimming Pool, Oradea; Referees: Bruno Navarra (ITA), Lazar Andjelic (SRB)
23 August 2025; 10:30	Report	Score by quarters: 0–3, 3–2, 4–3, 5–4 PSO: 4–5			“Ioan Alexandrescu” Swimming Pool, Oradea; Referees: Bruno Navarra (ITA), Lazar Andjelic (SRB)
23 August 2025; 10:30	Report	De Marco 5	Goals	Cutajar 4	“Ioan Alexandrescu” Swimming Pool, Oradea; Referees: Bruno Navarra (ITA), Lazar Andjelic (SRB)

=== Quarterfinals ===
22 August 2025; 16:00	Report	Montenegro	21–11	France	“Ioan Alexandrescu” Swimming Pool, Oradea; Referees: Nikolaos Boudramis (GRE), Jakov Blaskovic (CRO)
22 August 2025; 16:00	Report	Score by quarters: 3–1, 8–4, 7–1, 3–5			“Ioan Alexandrescu” Swimming Pool, Oradea; Referees: Nikolaos Boudramis (GRE), Jakov Blaskovic (CRO)
22 August 2025; 16:00	Report	Gojković 5	Goals	Novacek 5	“Ioan Alexandrescu” Swimming Pool, Oradea; Referees: Nikolaos Boudramis (GRE), Jakov Blaskovic (CRO)

22 August 2025; 17:30	Report	Croatia	16–17	Greece	“Ioan Alexandrescu” Swimming Pool, Oradea; Referees: Pau Segurana (ESP), Julien Bourges (FRA)
22 August 2025; 17:30	Report	Score by quarters: 4–4, 5–5, 4–4, 3–4			“Ioan Alexandrescu” Swimming Pool, Oradea; Referees: Pau Segurana (ESP), Julien Bourges (FRA)
22 August 2025; 17:30	Report	Jerkovic 7	Goals	Chatzis 4	“Ioan Alexandrescu” Swimming Pool, Oradea; Referees: Pau Segurana (ESP), Julien Bourges (FRA)

22 August 2025; 19:00	Report	Hungary	13–14	Serbia	“Ioan Alexandrescu” Swimming Pool, Oradea; Referees: Peter de Jong (NED), Levan Berishvili (GEO)
22 August 2025; 19:00	Report	Score by quarters: 3–3, 4–4, 2–3, 4–4			“Ioan Alexandrescu” Swimming Pool, Oradea; Referees: Peter de Jong (NED), Levan Berishvili (GEO)
22 August 2025; 19:00	Report	Benedek 7	Goals	Vojinovic 4	“Ioan Alexandrescu” Swimming Pool, Oradea; Referees: Peter de Jong (NED), Levan Berishvili (GEO)

22 August 2025; 20:30	Report	Italy	11–6	Spain	“Ioan Alexandrescu” Swimming Pool, Oradea; Referees: Norbert Ercse (HUN), Lazar Andjelic (SRB)
22 August 2025; 20:30	Report	Score by quarters: 3–1, 2–2, 3–2, 3–1			“Ioan Alexandrescu” Swimming Pool, Oradea; Referees: Norbert Ercse (HUN), Lazar Andjelic (SRB)
22 August 2025; 20:30	Report	Alessandrini 3	Goals	six players 1	“Ioan Alexandrescu” Swimming Pool, Oradea; Referees: Norbert Ercse (HUN), Lazar Andjelic (SRB)

=== 5th–8th place semifinals ===
23 August 2025; 16:00	Report	France	11–16	Spain	“Ioan Alexandrescu” Swimming Pool, Oradea; Referees: Ralf Mueller (GER), Sinisa Matijasevic (MNE)
23 August 2025; 16:00	Report	Score by quarters: 1–5, 2–1, 4–3, 4–7			“Ioan Alexandrescu” Swimming Pool, Oradea; Referees: Ralf Mueller (GER), Sinisa Matijasevic (MNE)
23 August 2025; 16:00	Report		Goals	Fernandez Perrier, Sordo Santaolalla 4	“Ioan Alexandrescu” Swimming Pool, Oradea; Referees: Ralf Mueller (GER), Sinisa Matijasevic (MNE)

23 August 2025; 17:30	Report	Croatia	14–18	Hungary	“Ioan Alexandrescu” Swimming Pool, Oradea; Referees: Nikolaos Boudramis (GRE), Massimo Angileri (MLT)
23 August 2025; 17:30	Report	Score by quarters: 6–6, 5–3, 0–4, 3–5			“Ioan Alexandrescu” Swimming Pool, Oradea; Referees: Nikolaos Boudramis (GRE), Massimo Angileri (MLT)
23 August 2025; 17:30	Report	Dragas, Dujmic 4	Goals	Benedek, Cseh 6	“Ioan Alexandrescu” Swimming Pool, Oradea; Referees: Nikolaos Boudramis (GRE), Massimo Angileri (MLT)

==== Seventh place game ====
24 August 2025; 15:00	Report	France	7–16	Croatia	“Ioan Alexandrescu” Swimming Pool, Oradea; Referees: Peter de Jong (NED), Mihnea Ioan Alexandrescu (ROU)
24 August 2025; 15:00	Report	Score by quarters: 2–5, 3–4, 0–5, 2–2			“Ioan Alexandrescu” Swimming Pool, Oradea; Referees: Peter de Jong (NED), Mihnea Ioan Alexandrescu (ROU)
24 August 2025; 15:00	Report	Barnat 3	Goals	Susic 5	“Ioan Alexandrescu” Swimming Pool, Oradea; Referees: Peter de Jong (NED), Mihnea Ioan Alexandrescu (ROU)

==== Fifth place game ====
24 August 2025; 16:30	Report	Spain	10–7	Hungary	“Ioan Alexandrescu” Swimming Pool, Oradea; Referees: Jakov Blašković (CRO), Julien Bourges (FRA)
24 August 2025; 16:30	Report	Score by quarters: 2–1, 2–1, 3–3, 3–2			“Ioan Alexandrescu” Swimming Pool, Oradea; Referees: Jakov Blašković (CRO), Julien Bourges (FRA)
24 August 2025; 16:30	Report	Comabella Cives 4	Goals	Rabb 3	“Ioan Alexandrescu” Swimming Pool, Oradea; Referees: Jakov Blašković (CRO), Julien Bourges (FRA)

=== Semifinals ===
23 August 2025; 19:00	Report	Montenegro	10–6	Italy	“Ioan Alexandrescu” Swimming Pool, Oradea; Referees: Jakov Blaskovic (CRO), Norbert Ercse (HUN)
23 August 2025; 19:00	Report	Score by quarters: 2–0, 5–5, 3–0, 0–1			“Ioan Alexandrescu” Swimming Pool, Oradea; Referees: Jakov Blaskovic (CRO), Norbert Ercse (HUN)
23 August 2025; 19:00	Report	Stupar 3	Goals	Chianese 3	“Ioan Alexandrescu” Swimming Pool, Oradea; Referees: Jakov Blaskovic (CRO), Norbert Ercse (HUN)

23 August 2025; 20:30	Report	Greece	14–20	Serbia	“Ioan Alexandrescu” Swimming Pool, Oradea; Referees: Julien Bourges (FRA), Peter de Jong (NED)
23 August 2025; 20:30	Report	Score by quarters: 2–5, 2–5, 5–5, 5–5			“Ioan Alexandrescu” Swimming Pool, Oradea; Referees: Julien Bourges (FRA), Peter de Jong (NED)
23 August 2025; 20:30	Report	Chatzis 8	Goals	Conkic, Lazic 4	“Ioan Alexandrescu” Swimming Pool, Oradea; Referees: Julien Bourges (FRA), Peter de Jong (NED)

==== Third place game ====
24 August 2025; 18:00	Report	Italy	11–12	Greece	“Ioan Alexandrescu” Swimming Pool, Oradea; Referees: Lazar Anđelić (SRB), Siniša Matijašević (MNE)
24 August 2025; 18:00	Report	Score by quarters: 3–3, 4–3, 2–4, 2–2			“Ioan Alexandrescu” Swimming Pool, Oradea; Referees: Lazar Anđelić (SRB), Siniša Matijašević (MNE)
24 August 2025; 18:00	Report	Alessandrini 3	Goals	Angelopoulos 6	“Ioan Alexandrescu” Swimming Pool, Oradea; Referees: Lazar Anđelić (SRB), Siniša Matijašević (MNE)

==== Final ====
24 August 2025; 19:30	Report	Montenegro	13–9	Serbia	“Ioan Alexandrescu” Swimming Pool, Oradea; Referees: Pau Segurana (ESP), Levan Bereshvili (GEO)
24 August 2025; 19:30	Report	Score by quarters: 3–2, 4–2, 5–2, 1–3			“Ioan Alexandrescu” Swimming Pool, Oradea; Referees: Pau Segurana (ESP), Levan Bereshvili (GEO)
24 August 2025; 19:30	Report	Stupar, Bošković, Gojković 3	Goals	Canepa 6	“Ioan Alexandrescu” Swimming Pool, Oradea; Referees: Pau Segurana (ESP), Levan Bereshvili (GEO)

== Final standings ==
Rank	Team
1st place, gold medalist(s)	Montenegro (3rd title)
2nd place, silver medalist(s)	Serbia
3rd place, bronze medalist(s)	Greece
4	Italy
5	Spain
6	Hungary
7	Croatia
8	France
9	Malta
10	Germany
11	Netherlands
12	Poland
13	Turkey
14	Romania
15	Georgia
16	Ukraine

Relegated to the 2027 Men's European U-18 Water Polo Championship Division I

== See also ==
- 2025 Men's European U-18 Water Polo Championship Division I
- 2025 Women's European U-18 Water Polo Championship
- 2025 Men's European U-16 Water Polo Championship
- 2025 Women's European U-16 Water Polo Championship
