= 2025 Women's European U-16 Water Polo Championship =

Youth women's water polo tournament

Tournament details
- Host country: Turkey
- City: Istanbul
- Venue: 1 (in 1 host city)
- Dates: 27 June – 3 July 2025
- Teams: 15 (from 1 confederation)

Final positions
- Champions: Spain (3rd title)
- Runners-up: Greece
- Third place: Hungary
- Fourth place: Italy

Official website
- European Aquatics

The 2025 Women's European U-16 Water Polo Championship was the fourth edition of the Women's European U-16 Water Polo Championship, organized by the European Aquatics. The tournament was played in Istanbul, Turkey, from 27 June to 3 July 2025. Starting this edition, the age level has changed from U15 to U16.

Spain successfully defended their title from the previous championship and became European champions for the third time overall.

== Host selection ==
Manisa was given the hosting rights on 13 November 2024, however, the host city was later changed to Istanbul.

== Participating teams ==
Originally, 16 teams entered the competition, one more than the previous edition. Ireland were the only team that participated in 2023 to not enter. Having not participated in 2023, France and Malta have decided to send a team. Israel later withdrew from the tournament, leaving the championship with only 15 participating teams.

The numbers in parentheses indicate the teams' placement in the previous edition.

Teams
Spain (1st)
Greece (2nd)
Hungary (3rd)
Italy (4th)
Netherlands (5th)
Croatia (6th)
Germany (7th)
Serbia (8th)
~~Israel~~ (9th)
Turkey (10th)
Romania (11th)
Czech Republic (12th)
Slovakia (14th)
Ukraine (15th)
France (N/A)
Malta (N/A)

== Venue ==
2025 Women's European U-16 Water Polo Championship is located in Turkey	Istanbul
2025 Women's European U-16 Water Polo Championship is located in Turkey	Beylikdüzü Swimming Pool

== Draw ==
The draw was held on 7 February 2025 in Zagreb, Croatia. The seeding was based on the results of the previous edition.

Division 1

Pot 1	Pot 2	Pot 3	Pot 4
Spain; Greece	Hungary; Italy	Netherlands; Croatia	Germany; Serbia

Division 2

Pot 5	Pot 6	Pot 7	Pot 8
~~Israel~~; Turkey	Romania; Czechia	Slovakia; Ukraine	France; Malta

== Preliminary round ==
All times are local (Turkey Time; UTC+3).

=== Division 1 ===
==== Group A ====
Pos	Team	Pld	W	PSW	PSL	L	GF	GA	GD	Pts	Qualification
1	Spain	3	3	0	0	0	55	21	+34	9	Quarterfinals
2	Hungary	3	2	0	0	1	48	25	+23	6	Quarterfinals
3	Netherlands	3	1	0	0	2	33	46	−13	3	Crossovers
4	Serbia	3	0	0	0	3	21	65	−44	0	Crossovers

Source: microplustimingservices.com
Rules for classification: 1) points; 2) head-to-head points; 3) head-to-head goal difference; 4) head-to-head number of goals scored; 5) Goal difference.

27 June 2025; 13:00	Report	Spain	20–6	Netherlands	Beylikdüzü Swimming Pool, Istanbul
27 June 2025; 13:00	Report	Score by quarters: 6–2, 3–1, 6–2, 5–1			Beylikdüzü Swimming Pool, Istanbul

27 June 2025; 16:00	Report	Hungary	23–5	Serbia	Beylikdüzü Swimming Pool, Istanbul
27 June 2025; 16:00	Report	Score by quarters: 7–3, 6–1, 4–1, 6–0			Beylikdüzü Swimming Pool, Istanbul

28 June 2025; 17:30	Report	Serbia	8–22	Netherlands	Beylikdüzü Swimming Pool, Istanbul
28 June 2025; 17:30	Report	Score by quarters: 1–6, 2–3, 1–7, 4–6			Beylikdüzü Swimming Pool, Istanbul

28 June 2025; 19:00	Report	Spain	15–7	Hungary	Beylikdüzü Swimming Pool, Istanbul
28 June 2025; 19:00	Report	Score by quarters: 6–3, 2–1, 4–1, 3–2			Beylikdüzü Swimming Pool, Istanbul

29 June 2025; 17:30	Report	Spain	20–8	Serbia	Beylikdüzü Swimming Pool, Istanbul
29 June 2025; 17:30	Report	Score by quarters: 5–0, 8–3, 3–2, 4–3			Beylikdüzü Swimming Pool, Istanbul

29 June 2025; 19:00	Report	Hungary	18–5	Netherlands	Beylikdüzü Swimming Pool, Istanbul
29 June 2025; 19:00	Report	Score by quarters: 6–0, 4–2, 3–1, 5–2			Beylikdüzü Swimming Pool, Istanbul

==== Group B ====
Pos	Team	Pld	W	PSW	PSL	L	GF	GA	GD	Pts	Qualification
1	Greece	3	3	0	0	0	61	21	+40	9	Quarterfinals
2	Italy	3	2	0	0	1	55	27	+28	6	Quarterfinals
3	Germany	3	1	0	0	2	17	53	−36	3	Crossovers
4	Croatia	3	0	0	0	3	22	54	−32	0	Crossovers

Source: microplustimingservices.com
Rules for classification: 1) points; 2) head-to-head points; 3) head-to-head goal difference; 4) head-to-head number of goals scored; 5) Goal difference.

27 June 2025; 17:30	Report	Greece	22–7	Croatia	Beylikdüzü Swimming Pool, Istanbul
27 June 2025; 17:30	Report	Score by quarters: 5–3, 7–1, 6–2, 4–1			Beylikdüzü Swimming Pool, Istanbul

27 June 2025; 19:00	Report	Italy	21–5	Germany	Beylikdüzü Swimming Pool, Istanbul
27 June 2025; 19:00	Report	Score by quarters: 4–0, 8–0, 3–5, 6–0			Beylikdüzü Swimming Pool, Istanbul

28 June 2025; 13:00	Report	Germany	8–6	Croatia	Beylikdüzü Swimming Pool, Istanbul
28 June 2025; 13:00	Report	Score by quarters: 3–2, 1–1, 3–1, 1–2			Beylikdüzü Swimming Pool, Istanbul

28 June 2025; 16:00	Report	Greece	13–10	Italy	Beylikdüzü Swimming Pool, Istanbul
28 June 2025; 16:00	Report	Score by quarters: 0–2, 6–4, 5–2, 2–2			Beylikdüzü Swimming Pool, Istanbul

29 June 2025; 13:00	Report	Greece	26–4	Germany	Beylikdüzü Swimming Pool, Istanbul
29 June 2025; 13:00	Report	Score by quarters: 6–0, 6–2, 8–2, 6–0			Beylikdüzü Swimming Pool, Istanbul

29 June 2025; 16:00	Report	Italy	24–9	Croatia	Beylikdüzü Swimming Pool, Istanbul
29 June 2025; 16:00	Report	Score by quarters: 7–1, 7–2, 5–4, 5–2			Beylikdüzü Swimming Pool, Istanbul

=== Division 2 ===
==== Group C ====
Pos	Team	Pld	W	PSW	PSL	L	GF	GA	GD	Pts	Qualification
1	Turkey (H)	3	3	0	0	0	39	27	+12	9	Crossovers
2	Czech Republic	3	2	0	0	1	30	27	+3	6	Crossovers
3	France	3	1	0	0	2	43	38	+5	3	13th–15th place classification
4	Slovakia	3	0	0	0	3	20	40	−20	0	13th–15th place classification

Source: microplustimingservices.com
Rules for classification: 1) points; 2) head-to-head points; 3) head-to-head goal difference; 4) head-to-head number of goals scored; 5) Goal difference.
(H) Host

27 June 2025; 10:00	Report	Czech Republic	15–13	France	Beylikdüzü Swimming Pool, Istanbul
27 June 2025; 10:00	Report	Score by quarters: 1–4, 5–2, 5–3, 4–4			Beylikdüzü Swimming Pool, Istanbul

27 June 2025; 20:30	Report	Turkey	14–8	Slovakia	Beylikdüzü Swimming Pool, Istanbul
27 June 2025; 20:30	Report	Score by quarters: 4–0, 3–3, 4–4, 3–1			Beylikdüzü Swimming Pool, Istanbul

28 June 2025; 11:30	Report	France	20–8	Slovakia	Beylikdüzü Swimming Pool, Istanbul
28 June 2025; 11:30	Report	Score by quarters: 3–1, 6–3, 6–3, 5–1			Beylikdüzü Swimming Pool, Istanbul

28 June 2025; 20:30	Report	Turkey	10–9	Czech Republic	Beylikdüzü Swimming Pool, Istanbul
28 June 2025; 20:30	Report	Score by quarters: 4–3, 0–5, 3–1, 3–0			Beylikdüzü Swimming Pool, Istanbul

29 June 2025; 10:00	Report	Czech Republic	6–4	Slovakia	Beylikdüzü Swimming Pool, Istanbul
29 June 2025; 10:00	Report	Score by quarters: 0–1, 0–1, 2–0, 4–2			Beylikdüzü Swimming Pool, Istanbul

29 June 2025; 20:30	Report	Turkey	15–10	France	Beylikdüzü Swimming Pool, Istanbul
29 June 2025; 20:30	Report	Score by quarters: 3–2, 4–2, 5–4, 3–2			Beylikdüzü Swimming Pool, Istanbul

==== Group D ====
Pos	Team	Pld	W	PSW	PSL	L	GF	GA	GD	Pts	Qualification
1	Romania	2	1	0	0	1	26	24	+2	3	Crossovers
2	Ukraine	2	1	0	0	1	26	25	+1	3	Crossovers
3	Malta	2	1	0	0	1	23	26	−3	3	13th–15th place classification

Source: microplustimingservices.com
Rules for classification: 1) points; 2) head-to-head points; 3) head-to-head goal difference; 4) head-to-head number of goals scored; 5) Goal difference.

27 June 2025; 11:30	Report	Romania	14–10	Malta	Beylikdüzü Swimming Pool, Istanbul
27 June 2025; 11:30	Report	Score by quarters: 5–2, 3–3, 1–3, 5–2			Beylikdüzü Swimming Pool, Istanbul

28 June 2025; 10:00	Report	Malta	13–12	Ukraine	Beylikdüzü Swimming Pool, Istanbul
28 June 2025; 10:00	Report	Score by quarters: 3–5, 2–1, 4–5, 4–1			Beylikdüzü Swimming Pool, Istanbul

29 June 2025; 11:30	Report	Romania	12–14	Ukraine	Beylikdüzü Swimming Pool, Istanbul
29 June 2025; 11:30	Report	Score by quarters: 3–4, 5–3, 2–4, 2–3			Beylikdüzü Swimming Pool, Istanbul

== 13th–15th place classification ==
Pos	Team	Pld	W	PSW	PSL	L	GF	GA	GD	Pts
13	France	2	2	0	0	0	30	18	+12	6
14	Slovakia	2	1	0	0	1	15	23	−8	3
15	Malta	2	0	0	0	2	15	19	−4	0

Source: microplustimingservices.com
Rules for classification: 1) points; 2) head-to-head points; 3) head-to-head goal difference; 4) head-to-head number of goals scored; 5) Goal difference.

1 July 2025; 10:00	Report	France	12–10	Malta	Beylikdüzü Swimming Pool, Istanbul
1 July 2025; 10:00	Report	Score by quarters: 3–1, 3–4, 3–4, 3–1			Beylikdüzü Swimming Pool, Istanbul

2 July 2025; 10:00	Report	Slovakia	7–5	Malta	Beylikdüzü Swimming Pool, Istanbul
2 July 2025; 10:00	Report	Score by quarters: 2–3, 3–1, 1–0, 1–1			Beylikdüzü Swimming Pool, Istanbul

3 July 2025; 14:00	Report	France	18–8	Slovakia	Beylikdüzü Swimming Pool, Istanbul
3 July 2025; 14:00	Report	Score by quarters: 5–1, 5–1, 2–4, 6–2			Beylikdüzü Swimming Pool, Istanbul

== Brackets ==
=== Main bracket ===
Crossovers
30 June
A4 Serbia	10
C1 Turkey	17
30 June
B3 Germany	15
D2 Ukraine	8
30 June
A3 Netherlands	25
C2 Czech Republic	6
30 June
B4 Croatia	22
D1 Romania	8

Quarterfinals
1 July
B1 Greece	19
C1 Turkey	1
1 July
A2 Hungary	14
B3 Germany	6
1 July
B2 Italy	11
A3 Netherlands	8
1 July
A1 Spain	16
B4 Croatia	3

Semifinals
2 July
B1 Greece	15
A2 Hungary	12
2 July
B2 Italy	10
A1 Spain	13

Final
3 July
B1 Greece	14
A1 Spain	19
Third place game
3 July
A2 Hungary	12
B2 Italy	11

=== 5th place bracket ===
5th–8th place semifinals
2 July
C1 Turkey	10
B3 Germany	7
2 July
A3 Netherlands	19
B4 Croatia	8

Fifth place game
3 July
C1 Turkey	6
A3 Netherlands	13
Seventh place game
3 July
B3 Germany	13
B4 Croatia	9

=== 9th place bracket ===
9th–12th place semifinals
1 July
A4 Serbia	18
D2 Ukraine	11
1 July
C2 Czech Republic	18
D1 Romania	11

Ninth place game
2 July
A4 Serbia	14
C2 Czech Republic	13
Eleventh place game
2 July
D2 Ukraine	9
D1 Romania	10

== Knockout stage ==
=== Crossovers ===
30 June 2025; 15:00	Report	Serbia	10–17	Turkey	Beylikdüzü Swimming Pool, Istanbul
30 June 2025; 15:00	Report	Score by quarters: 3–3, 2–5, 2–4, 3–5			Beylikdüzü Swimming Pool, Istanbul

30 June 2025; 16:30	Report	Netherlands	25–6	Czech Republic	Beylikdüzü Swimming Pool, Istanbul
30 June 2025; 16:30	Report	Score by quarters: 5–3, 4–0, 7–2, 9–1			Beylikdüzü Swimming Pool, Istanbul

30 June 2025; 18:00	Report	Croatia	22–8	Romania	Beylikdüzü Swimming Pool, Istanbul
30 June 2025; 18:00	Report	Score by quarters: 6–0, 6–0, 3–3, 7–5			Beylikdüzü Swimming Pool, Istanbul

30 June 2025; 19:30	Report	Germany	15–8	Ukraine	Beylikdüzü Swimming Pool, Istanbul
30 June 2025; 19:30	Report	Score by quarters: 1–1, 6–4, 3–1, 5–2			Beylikdüzü Swimming Pool, Istanbul

=== 9th–12th place semifinals ===
1 July 2025; 11:30	Report	Serbia	18–11	Ukraine	Beylikdüzü Swimming Pool, Istanbul
1 July 2025; 11:30	Report	Score by quarters: 6–2, 5–4, 5–3, 2–2			Beylikdüzü Swimming Pool, Istanbul

1 July 2025; 13:00	Report	Czech Republic	18–11	Romania	Beylikdüzü Swimming Pool, Istanbul
1 July 2025; 13:00	Report	Score by quarters: 4–1, 6–3, 4–4, 4–3			Beylikdüzü Swimming Pool, Istanbul

==== Eleventh place game ====
2 July 2025; 11:30	Report	Ukraine	9–10	Romania	Beylikdüzü Swimming Pool, Istanbul
2 July 2025; 11:30	Report	Score by quarters: 3–2, 2–3, 2–4, 2–1			Beylikdüzü Swimming Pool, Istanbul

==== Ninth place game ====
2 July 2025; 13:00	Report	Serbia	14–13	Czech Republic	Beylikdüzü Swimming Pool, Istanbul
2 July 2025; 13:00	Report	Score by quarters: 6–2, 2–4, 6–4, 0–3			Beylikdüzü Swimming Pool, Istanbul

=== Quarterfinals ===
1 July 2025; 16:00	Report	Greece	19–1	Turkey	Beylikdüzü Swimming Pool, Istanbul
1 July 2025; 16:00	Report	Score by quarters: 5–0, 4–0, 5–1, 5–0			Beylikdüzü Swimming Pool, Istanbul

1 July 2025; 17:30	Report	Italy	11–8	Netherlands	Beylikdüzü Swimming Pool, Istanbul
1 July 2025; 17:30	Report	Score by quarters: 4–1, 3–2, 2–4, 2–1			Beylikdüzü Swimming Pool, Istanbul

1 July 2025; 19:00	Report	Spain	16–3	Croatia	Beylikdüzü Swimming Pool, Istanbul
1 July 2025; 19:00	Report	Score by quarters: 4–1, 3–1, 5–0, 4–1			Beylikdüzü Swimming Pool, Istanbul

1 July 2025; 20:30	Report	Hungary	14–6	Germany	Beylikdüzü Swimming Pool, Istanbul
1 July 2025; 20:30	Report	Score by quarters: 1–1, 6–2, 6–2, 1–1			Beylikdüzü Swimming Pool, Istanbul

=== 5th–8th place semifinals ===
2 July 2025; 16:00	Report	Turkey	10–7	Germany	Beylikdüzü Swimming Pool, Istanbul
2 July 2025; 16:00	Report	Score by quarters: 2–0, 3–2, 4–3, 1–2			Beylikdüzü Swimming Pool, Istanbul

2 July 2025; 17:30	Report	Netherlands	19–8	Croatia	Beylikdüzü Swimming Pool, Istanbul
2 July 2025; 17:30	Report	Score by quarters: 5–2, 4–1, 6–3, 4–2			Beylikdüzü Swimming Pool, Istanbul

==== Seventh place game ====
3 July 2025; 15:30	Report	Germany	13–9	Croatia	Beylikdüzü Swimming Pool, Istanbul
3 July 2025; 15:30	Report	Score by quarters: 4–2, 2–1, 6–5, 1–1			Beylikdüzü Swimming Pool, Istanbul

==== Fifth place game ====
3 July 2025; 17:00	Report	Turkey	6–13	Netherlands	Beylikdüzü Swimming Pool, Istanbul
3 July 2025; 17:00	Report	Score by quarters: 1–4, 2–3, 1–4, 2–2			Beylikdüzü Swimming Pool, Istanbul

=== Semifinals ===
2 July 2025; 19:00	Report	Greece	15–12	Hungary	Beylikdüzü Swimming Pool, Istanbul
2 July 2025; 19:00	Report	Score by quarters: 5–4, 6–2, 3–2, 1–4			Beylikdüzü Swimming Pool, Istanbul

2 July 2025; 20:30	Report	Italy	10–13	Spain	Beylikdüzü Swimming Pool, Istanbul
2 July 2025; 20:30	Report	Score by quarters: 4–4, 3–4, 2–2, 1–3			Beylikdüzü Swimming Pool, Istanbul

==== Third place game ====
3 July 2025; 18:30	Report	Hungary	12–11	Italy	Beylikdüzü Swimming Pool, Istanbul
3 July 2025; 18:30	Report	Score by quarters: 3–2, 3–4, 2–3, 4–2			Beylikdüzü Swimming Pool, Istanbul

==== Final ====
3 July 2025; 20:00	Report	Greece	14–19	Spain	Beylikdüzü Swimming Pool, Istanbul
3 July 2025; 20:00	Report	Score by quarters: 4–5, 3–6, 2–3, 5–5			Beylikdüzü Swimming Pool, Istanbul

== Final standings ==
Rank	Team
1st place, gold medalist(s)	Spain
2nd place, silver medalist(s)	Greece
3rd place, bronze medalist(s)	Hungary
4	Italy
5	Netherlands
6	Turkey
7	Germany
8	Croatia
9	Serbia
10	Czech Republic
11	Romania
12	Ukraine
13	France
14	Slovakia
15	Malta

== See also ==
- 2025 Men's European U-16 Water Polo Championship
- 2025 Women's European U-18 Water Polo Championship
- 2025 Men's European U-18 Water Polo Championship
- 2025 Men's European U-18 Water Polo Championship Division I
