= 2025 Women's European U-18 Water Polo Championship =

International youth water polo tournament

Tournament details
- Host country: Malta
- City: Gżira
- Venue: 1 (in 1 host city)
- Dates: 31 August – 7 September 2025
- Teams: 19 (from 1 confederation)

Final positions
- Champions: Spain (3rd title)
- Runners-up: Greece
- Third place: Hungary
- Fourth place: Italy

Tournament statistics
- Matches played: 64

Official website
- European Aquatics

The 2025 Women's European U-18 Water Polo Championship was the 14th edition of the Women's European U-18 Water Polo Championship, organized by the European Aquatics. The tournament was played at the Tal-Qroqq Sports Complex in Gżira, Malta, from 31 August to 7 September 2025. Starting this edition, the age level has changed from U17 to U18. Spain won the tournament and became the European champions for the third time.

== Host selection ==
Gżira was given the hosting rights on 13 November 2024.

== Participating teams ==
19 teams entered the competition, two more than the previous edition. France were the only team that participated in 2023 to not enter. Having not participated in 2023, Bulgaria, Czechia and Germany have decided to send a team. Parenthesis indicate their placement at the previous edition.

Teams
Hungary (1st)
Spain (2nd)
Greece (3rd)
Italy (4th)
Netherlands (5th)
Israel (6th)
Croatia (7th)
Türkiye (8th)
Slovakia (10th)
Serbia (11th)
Malta (12th)
Great Britain (13th)
Romania (14th)
Ireland (15th)
Switzerland (16th)
Ukraine (17th)
Bulgaria (N/A)
Czechia (N/A)
Germany (N/A)

== Venue ==
| 2025 Women's European U-18 Water Polo Championship is located in Malta | Gżira |
|---|---|
| 2025 Women's European U-18 Water Polo Championship is located in Malta | Tal-Qroqq Sports Complex |
| 2025 Women's European U-18 Water Polo Championship is located in Malta | Capacity: |

== Draw ==
The draw was held on 7 February 2025 at 10:30 CET in Zagreb, Croatia. The seeding was based on the results of the previous edition.

Division 1

| Pot 1 | Pot 2 | Pot 3 | Pot 4 |
|---|---|---|---|
| Hungary; Spain | Greece; Italy | Netherlands; Israel | Croatia; Türkiye |

Division 2

| Pot 5 | Pot 6 | Pot 7 | Pot 8 | Pot 9 |
|---|---|---|---|---|
| Slovakia; Serbia | Malta; Great Britain | Romania; Ireland | Switzerland; Ukraine | Bulgaria; Czechia; Germany |

== Preliminary round ==
All times are local (Central European Summer Time; UTC+2).

=== Division 1 ===
==== Group A ====
| Pos | Team | Pld | W | PSW | PSL | L | GF | GA | GD | Pts | Qualification |
|---|---|---|---|---|---|---|---|---|---|---|---|
| 1 | Italy | 3 | 2 | 1 | 0 | 0 | 48 | 37 | +11 | 8 | Quarterfinals |
| 2 | Hungary | 3 | 2 | 0 | 1 | 0 | 45 | 25 | +20 | 7 | Quarterfinals |
| 3 | Netherlands | 3 | 1 | 0 | 0 | 2 | 34 | 36 | −2 | 3 | Crossovers |
| 4 | Türkiye | 3 | 0 | 0 | 0 | 3 | 25 | 54 | −29 | 0 | Crossovers |

Source: microplustimingservices.com
Rules for classification: 1) points; 2) head-to-head points; 3) head-to-head goal difference; 4) head-to-head number of goals scored; 5) Goal difference.

| 1 September 2025; 8:30 | Report | Hungary | 15–7 | Netherlands | Tal-Qroqq Sports Complex, Gżira; Referees: Maria Daskalopoulou (GRE), Matan Schwartz(ISR) |
| 1 September 2025; 8:30 | Report | Score by quarters: 4–2, 3–3, 3–1, 5–1 | | | Tal-Qroqq Sports Complex, Gżira; Referees: Maria Daskalopoulou (GRE), Matan Schwartz(ISR) |
| 1 September 2025; 8:30 | Report | Gulyas-Oldal, Kincso 3 | Goals | Botermans 2 | Tal-Qroqq Sports Complex, Gżira; Referees: Maria Daskalopoulou (GRE), Matan Schwartz(ISR) |

| 1 September 2025; 10:00 | Report | Italy | 21–13 | Turkey | Tal-Qroqq Sports Complex, Gżira; Referees: Ivanka Krstonosic Rakovic (SRB), Jakub Necas (CZE) |
| 1 September 2025; 10:00 | Report | Score by quarters: 5–3, 5–2, 5–6, 6–2 | | | Tal-Qroqq Sports Complex, Gżira; Referees: Ivanka Krstonosic Rakovic (SRB), Jakub Necas (CZE) |
| 1 September 2025; 10:00 | Report | Minuto 5 | Goals | Dabbag 5 | Tal-Qroqq Sports Complex, Gżira; Referees: Ivanka Krstonosic Rakovic (SRB), Jakub Necas (CZE) |

| 2 September 2025; 18:00 | Report | Turkey | 7–16 | Netherlands | Tal-Qroqq Sports Complex, Gżira; Referees: Lea Saftic (CRO), Manuel Manea (ROU) |
| 2 September 2025; 18:00 | Report | Score by quarters: 0–3, 2–6, 3–2, 2–5 | | | Tal-Qroqq Sports Complex, Gżira; Referees: Lea Saftic (CRO), Manuel Manea (ROU) |
| 2 September 2025; 18:00 | Report | Dabbag 3 | Goals | three players 3 | Tal-Qroqq Sports Complex, Gżira; Referees: Lea Saftic (CRO), Manuel Manea (ROU) |

| 2 September 2025; 21:00 | Report | Hungary | 17–18 (PSO) | Italy | Tal-Qroqq Sports Complex, Gżira; Referees: Martina Kunikova (SVK), Jaume Teixido (ESP) |
| 2 September 2025; 21:00 | Report | Score by quarters: 4–5, 2–3, 5–4, 2–1 PSO: 4–5 | | | Tal-Qroqq Sports Complex, Gżira; Referees: Martina Kunikova (SVK), Jaume Teixido (ESP) |
| 2 September 2025; 21:00 | Report | five players 2 | Goals | Bovo 6 | Tal-Qroqq Sports Complex, Gżira; Referees: Martina Kunikova (SVK), Jaume Teixido (ESP) |

| 3 September 2025; 18:00 | Report | Hungary | 17–5 | Turkey | Tal-Qroqq Sports Complex, Gżira; Referees: Risto Damchevski (BUL), Jurjaj Mudroch (SUI) |
| 3 September 2025; 18:00 | Report | Score by quarters: 5–1, 5–2, 4–1, 3–1 | | | Tal-Qroqq Sports Complex, Gżira; Referees: Risto Damchevski (BUL), Jurjaj Mudroch (SUI) |
| 3 September 2025; 18:00 | Report | three players 3 | Goals | five players 1 | Tal-Qroqq Sports Complex, Gżira; Referees: Risto Damchevski (BUL), Jurjaj Mudroch (SUI) |

| 3 September 2025; 21:00 | Report | Italy | 14–11 | Netherlands | Tal-Qroqq Sports Complex, Gżira; Referees: Maria Daskalopoulou (GRE), Stefan Licari (MLT) |
| 3 September 2025; 21:00 | Report | Score by quarters: 5–3, 3–2, 2–2, 4–4 | | | Tal-Qroqq Sports Complex, Gżira; Referees: Maria Daskalopoulou (GRE), Stefan Licari (MLT) |
| 3 September 2025; 21:00 | Report | three players 3 | Goals | Heerink 4 | Tal-Qroqq Sports Complex, Gżira; Referees: Maria Daskalopoulou (GRE), Stefan Licari (MLT) |

==== Group B ====
| Pos | Team | Pld | W | PSW | PSL | L | GF | GA | GD | Pts | Qualification |
|---|---|---|---|---|---|---|---|---|---|---|---|
| 1 | Spain | 3 | 3 | 0 | 0 | 0 | 62 | 22 | +40 | 9 | Quarterfinals |
| 2 | Greece | 3 | 2 | 0 | 0 | 1 | 51 | 34 | +17 | 6 | Quarterfinals |
| 3 | Croatia | 3 | 1 | 0 | 0 | 2 | 41 | 55 | −14 | 3 | Crossovers |
| 4 | Israel | 3 | 0 | 0 | 0 | 3 | 21 | 64 | −43 | 0 | Crossovers |

Source: microplustimingservices.com
Rules for classification: 1) points; 2) head-to-head points; 3) head-to-head goal difference; 4) head-to-head number of goals scored; 5) Goal difference.

| 1 September 2025; 18:00 | Report | Spain | 24–5 | Israel | Tal-Qroqq Sports Complex, Gżira; Referees: Martina Kunikova (SVK), Connor Jukes (GBR) |
| 1 September 2025; 18:00 | Report | Score by quarters: 7–0, 6–1, 5–2, 6–2 | | | Tal-Qroqq Sports Complex, Gżira; Referees: Martina Kunikova (SVK), Connor Jukes (GBR) |
| 1 September 2025; 18:00 | Report | Laguna Rodriguez 4 | Goals | Dorfman 2 | Tal-Qroqq Sports Complex, Gżira; Referees: Martina Kunikova (SVK), Connor Jukes (GBR) |

| 1 September 2025; 21:00 | Report | Greece | 20–15 | Croatia | Tal-Qroqq Sports Complex, Gżira; Referees: Marco Ercoli (ITA), Manuel Manea (ROU) |
| 1 September 2025; 21:00 | Report | Score by quarters: 4–1, 9–3, 6–5, 1–6 | | | Tal-Qroqq Sports Complex, Gżira; Referees: Marco Ercoli (ITA), Manuel Manea (ROU) |
| 1 September 2025; 21:00 | Report | Krassa 5 | Goals | Butic 6 | Tal-Qroqq Sports Complex, Gżira; Referees: Marco Ercoli (ITA), Manuel Manea (ROU) |

| 2 September 2025; 15:00 | Report | Croatia | 18–10 | Israel | Tal-Qroqq Sports Complex, Gżira; Referees: Koppany Toth (HUN), Stefan Licari (MLT) |
| 2 September 2025; 15:00 | Report | Score by quarters: 5–1, 3–4, 6–2, 4–3 | | | Tal-Qroqq Sports Complex, Gżira; Referees: Koppany Toth (HUN), Stefan Licari (MLT) |
| 2 September 2025; 15:00 | Report | Butic, N. Jankovic 5 | Goals | three players 2 | Tal-Qroqq Sports Complex, Gżira; Referees: Koppany Toth (HUN), Stefan Licari (MLT) |

| 2 September 2025; 16:30 | Report | Spain | 13–9 | Greece | Tal-Qroqq Sports Complex, Gżira; Referees: Ivanka Krstonosic Rakovic (SRB), Ruben Sap (NED) |
| 2 September 2025; 16:30 | Report | Score by quarters: 3–2, 3–2, 3–1, 4–4 | | | Tal-Qroqq Sports Complex, Gżira; Referees: Ivanka Krstonosic Rakovic (SRB), Ruben Sap (NED) |
| 2 September 2025; 16:30 | Report | Girones Vara 3 | Goals | Bitsakou, Krassa 2 | Tal-Qroqq Sports Complex, Gżira; Referees: Ivanka Krstonosic Rakovic (SRB), Ruben Sap (NED) |

| 3 September 2025; 15:00 | Report | Spain | 25–8 | Croatia | Tal-Qroqq Sports Complex, Gżira; Referees: Marco Ercoli (ITA), Connor Jukes (GBR) |
| 3 September 2025; 15:00 | Report | Score by quarters: 6–1, 6–3, 6–3, 7–1 | | | Tal-Qroqq Sports Complex, Gżira; Referees: Marco Ercoli (ITA), Connor Jukes (GBR) |
| 3 September 2025; 15:00 | Report | three players 4 | Goals | M. Jankovic 2 | Tal-Qroqq Sports Complex, Gżira; Referees: Marco Ercoli (ITA), Connor Jukes (GBR) |

| 3 September 2025; 16:30 | Report | Greece | 22–6 | Israel | Tal-Qroqq Sports Complex, Gżira; Referees: Karl Wilkes (IRL), Jakub Necas (CZE) |
| 3 September 2025; 16:30 | Report | Score by quarters: 5–0, 7–2, 5–3, 5–1 | | | Tal-Qroqq Sports Complex, Gżira; Referees: Karl Wilkes (IRL), Jakub Necas (CZE) |
| 3 September 2025; 16:30 | Report | Karagianni 4 | Goals | Dorfman, Wissmann 2 | Tal-Qroqq Sports Complex, Gżira; Referees: Karl Wilkes (IRL), Jakub Necas (CZE) |

=== Division 2 ===
==== Group C ====
| Pos | Team | Pld | W | PSW | PSL | L | GF | GA | GD | Pts | Qualification |
|---|---|---|---|---|---|---|---|---|---|---|---|
| 1 | Serbia | 4 | 4 | 0 | 0 | 0 | 66 | 36 | +30 | 12 | Crossovers |
| 2 | Germany | 4 | 3 | 0 | 0 | 1 | 59 | 34 | +25 | 9 | Crossovers |
| 3 | Malta (H) | 4 | 2 | 0 | 0 | 2 | 50 | 61 | −11 | 6 | 13th–16th place semifinals |
| 4 | Ukraine | 4 | 1 | 0 | 0 | 3 | 48 | 63 | −15 | 3 | 13th–16th place semifinals |
| 5 | Ireland | 4 | 0 | 0 | 0 | 4 | 40 | 69 | −29 | 0 | 17th–19th place classification |

Source: microplustimingservices.com
Rules for classification: 1) points; 2) head-to-head points; 3) head-to-head goal difference; 4) head-to-head number of goals scored; 5) Goal difference.
(H) Host

| 31 August 2025; 12:30 | Report | Ukraine | 5–14 | Germany | Tal-Qroqq Sports Complex, Gżira; Referees: Ilkin Cakmakoglu (TUR), Connor Jukes (GBR) |
| 31 August 2025; 12:30 | Report | Score by quarters: 0–3, 3–2, 0–3, 2–6 | | | Tal-Qroqq Sports Complex, Gżira; Referees: Ilkin Cakmakoglu (TUR), Connor Jukes (GBR) |
| 31 August 2025; 12:30 | Report | Rudnyk 4 | Goals | Dzaja 5 | Tal-Qroqq Sports Complex, Gżira; Referees: Ilkin Cakmakoglu (TUR), Connor Jukes (GBR) |

| 31 August 2025; 14:00 | Report | Malta | 14–11 | Ireland | Tal-Qroqq Sports Complex, Gżira; Referees: Jakub Necas (CZE), Risto Damchevski (BUL) |
| 31 August 2025; 14:00 | Report | Score by quarters: 4–3, 3–2, 3–3, 4–3 | | | Tal-Qroqq Sports Complex, Gżira; Referees: Jakub Necas (CZE), Risto Damchevski (BUL) |
| 31 August 2025; 14:00 | Report | Schembri 5 | Goals | Casserly 8 | Tal-Qroqq Sports Complex, Gżira; Referees: Jakub Necas (CZE), Risto Damchevski (BUL) |

| 31 August 2025; 20:00 | Report | Ireland | 7–20 | Germany | Tal-Qroqq Sports Complex, Gżira; Referees: Lea Saftic (CRO), Manuel Manea (ROU) |
| 31 August 2025; 20:00 | Report | Score by quarters: 3–6, 3–5, 1–5, 0–4 | | | Tal-Qroqq Sports Complex, Gżira; Referees: Lea Saftic (CRO), Manuel Manea (ROU) |
| 31 August 2025; 20:00 | Report | Casserly 3 | Goals | Dzaja 6 | Tal-Qroqq Sports Complex, Gżira; Referees: Lea Saftic (CRO), Manuel Manea (ROU) |

| 31 August 2025; 21:30 | Report | Serbia | 17–11 | Ukraine | Tal-Qroqq Sports Complex, Gżira; Referees: Martina Kunikova (SVK), Jurjaj Mudroch (SUI) |
| 31 August 2025; 21:30 | Report | Score by quarters: 4–1, 5–4, 4–2, 4–4 | | | Tal-Qroqq Sports Complex, Gżira; Referees: Martina Kunikova (SVK), Jurjaj Mudroch (SUI) |
| 31 August 2025; 21:30 | Report | Cuk 6 | Goals | Rudnyk 7 | Tal-Qroqq Sports Complex, Gżira; Referees: Martina Kunikova (SVK), Jurjaj Mudroch (SUI) |

| 1 September 2025; 16:30 | Report | Ireland | 15–17 | Ukraine | Tal-Qroqq Sports Complex, Gżira; Referees: Jurjaj Mudroch (SUI), Risto Damchevski (BUL) |
| 1 September 2025; 16:30 | Report | Score by quarters: 4–3, 4–6, 4–3, 3–5 | | | Tal-Qroqq Sports Complex, Gżira; Referees: Jurjaj Mudroch (SUI), Risto Damchevski (BUL) |
| 1 September 2025; 16:30 | Report | Casserly 7 | Goals | Rudnyk 7 | Tal-Qroqq Sports Complex, Gżira; Referees: Jurjaj Mudroch (SUI), Risto Damchevski (BUL) |

| 1 September 2025; 19:30 | Report | Serbia | 19–9 | Malta | Tal-Qroqq Sports Complex, Gżira; Referees: Lea Saftic (CRO), Ruben Sap (NED) |
| 1 September 2025; 19:30 | Report | Score by quarters: 4–0, 5–1, 3–5, 7–3 | | | Tal-Qroqq Sports Complex, Gżira; Referees: Lea Saftic (CRO), Ruben Sap (NED) |
| 1 September 2025; 19:30 | Report | Jankovic 5 | Goals | three players 2 | Tal-Qroqq Sports Complex, Gżira; Referees: Lea Saftic (CRO), Ruben Sap (NED) |

| 2 September 2025; 13:00 | Report | Germany | 9–12 | Serbia | Tal-Qroqq Sports Complex, Gżira; Referees: Marco Ercoli (ITA), Risto Damchevski (BUL) |
| 2 September 2025; 13:00 | Report | Score by quarters: 2–2, 2–4, 3–3, 2–3 | | | Tal-Qroqq Sports Complex, Gżira; Referees: Marco Ercoli (ITA), Risto Damchevski (BUL) |
| 2 September 2025; 13:00 | Report | Dzaja 3 | Goals | Radonjic 6 | Tal-Qroqq Sports Complex, Gżira; Referees: Marco Ercoli (ITA), Risto Damchevski (BUL) |

| 2 September 2025; 19:30 | Report | Ukraine | 15–17 | Malta | Tal-Qroqq Sports Complex, Gżira; Referees: Connor Jukes (GBR), Jakub Necas (CZE) |
| 2 September 2025; 19:30 | Report | Score by quarters: 4–5, 6–1, 4–5, 1–6 | | | Tal-Qroqq Sports Complex, Gżira; Referees: Connor Jukes (GBR), Jakub Necas (CZE) |
| 2 September 2025; 19:30 | Report | Lytvyniuk, Rudnyk 4 | Goals | C. Amato 7 | Tal-Qroqq Sports Complex, Gżira; Referees: Connor Jukes (GBR), Jakub Necas (CZE) |

| 3 September 2025; 8:30 | Report | Serbia | 18–7 | Ireland | Tal-Qroqq Sports Complex, Gżira; Referees: Martina Kunikova (SVK), Manuel Manea (ROU) |
| 3 September 2025; 8:30 | Report | Score by quarters: 6–1, 6–1, 2–1, 4–4 | | | Tal-Qroqq Sports Complex, Gżira; Referees: Martina Kunikova (SVK), Manuel Manea (ROU) |
| 3 September 2025; 8:30 | Report | Cuk, Radonjic 4 | Goals | =Casserly 4 | Tal-Qroqq Sports Complex, Gżira; Referees: Martina Kunikova (SVK), Manuel Manea (ROU) |

| 3 September 2025; 19:30 | Report | Malta | 10–16 | Germany | Tal-Qroqq Sports Complex, Gżira; Referees: Lea Saftic (CRO), Ilkin Cakmakoglu (TUR) |
| 3 September 2025; 19:30 | Report | Score by quarters: 4–4, 2–3, 0–5, 4–4 | | | Tal-Qroqq Sports Complex, Gżira; Referees: Lea Saftic (CRO), Ilkin Cakmakoglu (TUR) |
| 3 September 2025; 19:30 | Report | Schembri 3 | Goals | Dzaja, Schussler 5 | Tal-Qroqq Sports Complex, Gżira; Referees: Lea Saftic (CRO), Ilkin Cakmakoglu (TUR) |

==== Group D ====
| Pos | Team | Pld | W | PSW | PSL | L | GF | GA | GD | Pts | Qualification |
|---|---|---|---|---|---|---|---|---|---|---|---|
| 1 | Great Britain | 5 | 5 | 0 | 0 | 0 | 113 | 30 | +83 | 15 | Crossovers |
| 2 | Slovakia | 5 | 3 | 0 | 1 | 1 | 57 | 52 | +5 | 10 | Crossovers |
| 3 | Czechia | 5 | 3 | 0 | 0 | 2 | 87 | 54 | +33 | 9 | 13th–16th place semifinals |
| 4 | Romania | 5 | 2 | 1 | 0 | 2 | 50 | 51 | −1 | 8 | 13th–16th place semifinals |
| 5 | Switzerland | 5 | 1 | 0 | 0 | 4 | 30 | 72 | −42 | 3 | 17th–19th place classification |
| 6 | Bulgaria | 5 | 0 | 0 | 0 | 5 | 28 | 106 | −78 | 0 | 17th–19th place classification |

Source: microplustimingservices.com
Rules for classification: 1) points; 2) head-to-head points; 3) head-to-head goal difference; 4) head-to-head number of goals scored; 5) Goal difference.

| 31 August 2025; 8:00 | Report | Czech Republic | 34–4 | Bulgaria | Tal-Qroqq Sports Complex, Gżira; Referees: Jaume Teixido (ESP), Svitlana Vyshnevska (UKR) |
| 31 August 2025; 8:00 | Report | Score by quarters: 13–1, 9–2, 8–0, 4–1 | | | Tal-Qroqq Sports Complex, Gżira; Referees: Jaume Teixido (ESP), Svitlana Vyshnevska (UKR) |
| 31 August 2025; 8:00 | Report | Chodlova 8 | Goals | Marinova 3 | Tal-Qroqq Sports Complex, Gżira; Referees: Jaume Teixido (ESP), Svitlana Vyshnevska (UKR) |

| 31 August 2025; 9:30 | Report | Slovakia | 12–7 | Switzerland | Tal-Qroqq Sports Complex, Gżira; Referees: Richard Noach (GER), Karl Wilkes (IRL) |
| 31 August 2025; 9:30 | Report | Score by quarters: 2–2, 2–0, 3–3, 5–2 | | | Tal-Qroqq Sports Complex, Gżira; Referees: Richard Noach (GER), Karl Wilkes (IRL) |
| 31 August 2025; 9:30 | Report | Holicova 5 | Goals | Soder 3 | Tal-Qroqq Sports Complex, Gżira; Referees: Richard Noach (GER), Karl Wilkes (IRL) |

| 31 August 2025; 11:00 | Report | Great Britain | 17–7 | Romania | Tal-Qroqq Sports Complex, Gżira; Referees: Lea Saftic (CRO), Stefan Licari (MLT) |
| 31 August 2025; 11:00 | Report | Score by quarters: 4–0, 6–0, 2–4, 5–3 | | | Tal-Qroqq Sports Complex, Gżira; Referees: Lea Saftic (CRO), Stefan Licari (MLT) |
| 31 August 2025; 11:00 | Report | Perkins 6 | Goals | Novacean 3 | Tal-Qroqq Sports Complex, Gżira; Referees: Lea Saftic (CRO), Stefan Licari (MLT) |

| 31 August 2025; 15:30 | Report | Switzerland | 5–22 | Czech Republic | Tal-Qroqq Sports Complex, Gżira; Referees: Maria Daskalopoulou (GRE), Marco Ercoli (ITA) |
| 31 August 2025; 15:30 | Report | Score by quarters: 0–7, 2–6, 1–6, 2–3 | | | Tal-Qroqq Sports Complex, Gżira; Referees: Maria Daskalopoulou (GRE), Marco Ercoli (ITA) |
| 31 August 2025; 15:30 | Report | Reiss 2 | Goals | Holicova 4 | Tal-Qroqq Sports Complex, Gżira; Referees: Maria Daskalopoulou (GRE), Marco Ercoli (ITA) |

| 31 August 2025; 17:00 | Report | Bulgaria | 4–36 | Great Britain | Tal-Qroqq Sports Complex, Gżira; Referees: Ivanka Krstonosic Rakovic (SRB), Koppany Toth (HUN) |
| 31 August 2025; 17:00 | Report | Score by quarters: 1–11, 2–8, 1–8, 0–9 | | | Tal-Qroqq Sports Complex, Gżira; Referees: Ivanka Krstonosic Rakovic (SRB), Koppany Toth (HUN) |
| 31 August 2025; 17:00 | Report | V. Dobrinska 2 | Goals | Perkins 12 | Tal-Qroqq Sports Complex, Gżira; Referees: Ivanka Krstonosic Rakovic (SRB), Koppany Toth (HUN) |

| 31 August 2025; 18:30 | Report | Romania | 14–12 (PSO) | Slovakia | Tal-Qroqq Sports Complex, Gżira; Referees: Matan Schwartz (ISR), Ruben Sap (NED) |
| 31 August 2025; 18:30 | Report | Score by quarters: 2–3, 2–1, 4–1, 1–4 PSO: 5–3 | | | Tal-Qroqq Sports Complex, Gżira; Referees: Matan Schwartz (ISR), Ruben Sap (NED) |
| 31 August 2025; 18:30 | Report | Novacean 4 | Goals | Holicova 4 | Tal-Qroqq Sports Complex, Gżira; Referees: Matan Schwartz (ISR), Ruben Sap (NED) |

| 1 September 2025; 11:30 | Report | Switzerland | 7–5 | Bulgaria | Tal-Qroqq Sports Complex, Gżira; Referees: Richard Noach (GER), Koppany Toth (HUN) |
| 1 September 2025; 11:30 | Report | Score by quarters: 0–2, 1–1, 6–1, 0–1 | | | Tal-Qroqq Sports Complex, Gżira; Referees: Richard Noach (GER), Koppany Toth (HUN) |
| 1 September 2025; 11:30 | Report | Grandchamp, Mikulic 2 | Goals | R. Dobrinska 3 | Tal-Qroqq Sports Complex, Gżira; Referees: Richard Noach (GER), Koppany Toth (HUN) |

| 1 September 2025; 13:00 | Report | Slovakia | 6–17 | Great Britain | Tal-Qroqq Sports Complex, Gżira; Referees: Ilkin Cakmakoglu (TUR), Stefan Licari (MLT) |
| 1 September 2025; 13:00 | Report | Score by quarters: 0–6, 2–4, 2–3, 2–4 | | | Tal-Qroqq Sports Complex, Gżira; Referees: Ilkin Cakmakoglu (TUR), Stefan Licari (MLT) |
| 1 September 2025; 13:00 | Report | Vargova 2 | Goals | Perkins 6 | Tal-Qroqq Sports Complex, Gżira; Referees: Ilkin Cakmakoglu (TUR), Stefan Licari (MLT) |

| 1 September 2025; 15:00 | Report | Czech Republic | 12–11 | Romania | Tal-Qroqq Sports Complex, Gżira; Referees: Jaume Teixido (ESP), Karl Wilkes (IRL) |
| 1 September 2025; 15:00 | Report | Score by quarters: 3–5, 6–4, 0–0, 3–2 | | | Tal-Qroqq Sports Complex, Gżira; Referees: Jaume Teixido (ESP), Karl Wilkes (IRL) |
| 1 September 2025; 15:00 | Report | Bakalova, Grecova 3 | Goals | Plesca 4 | Tal-Qroqq Sports Complex, Gżira; Referees: Jaume Teixido (ESP), Karl Wilkes (IRL) |

| 2 September 2025; 8:30 | Report | Great Britain | 20–9 | Czech Republic | Tal-Qroqq Sports Complex, Gżira; Referees: Ilkin Cakmakoglu (TUR), Richard Noach (GER) |
| 2 September 2025; 8:30 | Report | Score by quarters: 5–3, 4–2, 5–4, 6–0 | | | Tal-Qroqq Sports Complex, Gżira; Referees: Ilkin Cakmakoglu (TUR), Richard Noach (GER) |
| 2 September 2025; 8:30 | Report | Perkins 10 | Goals | Bakalova 4 | Tal-Qroqq Sports Complex, Gżira; Referees: Ilkin Cakmakoglu (TUR), Richard Noach (GER) |

| 2 September 2025; 10:00 | Report | Romania | 10–7 | Switzerland | Tal-Qroqq Sports Complex, Gżira; Referees: Matan Schwartz (ISR), Svitlana Vyshnevska (UKR) |
| 2 September 2025; 10:00 | Report | Score by quarters: 2–1, 4–1, 2–2, 2–3 | | | Tal-Qroqq Sports Complex, Gżira; Referees: Matan Schwartz (ISR), Svitlana Vyshnevska (UKR) |
| 2 September 2025; 10:00 | Report | Novacean 4 | Goals | Reiss, Soder 3 | Tal-Qroqq Sports Complex, Gżira; Referees: Matan Schwartz (ISR), Svitlana Vyshnevska (UKR) |

| 2 September 2025; 11:30 | Report | Slovakia | 16–9 | Bulgaria | Tal-Qroqq Sports Complex, Gżira; Referees: Maria Daskalopoulou (GRE), Karl Wilkes (IRL) |
| 2 September 2025; 11:30 | Report | Score by quarters: 8–0, 3–3, 2–3, 3–3 | | | Tal-Qroqq Sports Complex, Gżira; Referees: Maria Daskalopoulou (GRE), Karl Wilkes (IRL) |
| 2 September 2025; 11:30 | Report | four players 3 | Goals | Todorova 4 | Tal-Qroqq Sports Complex, Gżira; Referees: Maria Daskalopoulou (GRE), Karl Wilkes (IRL) |

| 3 September 2025; 10:00 | Report | Switzerland | 4–23 | Great Britain | Tal-Qroqq Sports Complex, Gżira; Referees: Ivanka Krstonosic Rakovic (SRB), Svitlana Vyshnevska (UKR) |
| 3 September 2025; 10:00 | Report | Score by quarters: 0–5, 1–3, 1–7, 2–8 | | | Tal-Qroqq Sports Complex, Gżira; Referees: Ivanka Krstonosic Rakovic (SRB), Svitlana Vyshnevska (UKR) |
| 3 September 2025; 10:00 | Report | Soder 2 | Goals | Perkins 7 | Tal-Qroqq Sports Complex, Gżira; Referees: Ivanka Krstonosic Rakovic (SRB), Svitlana Vyshnevska (UKR) |

| 3 September 2025; 11:30 | Report | Slovakia | 14–10 | Czech Republic | Tal-Qroqq Sports Complex, Gżira; Referees: Jaume Teixido (ESP), Koppany Toth (HUN) |
| 3 September 2025; 11:30 | Report | Score by quarters: 2–3, 4–1, 3–3, 5–3 | | | Tal-Qroqq Sports Complex, Gżira; Referees: Jaume Teixido (ESP), Koppany Toth (HUN) |
| 3 September 2025; 11:30 | Report | Balazsova 5 | Goals | Chodlova 3 | Tal-Qroqq Sports Complex, Gżira; Referees: Jaume Teixido (ESP), Koppany Toth (HUN) |

| 3 September 2025; 13:00 | Report | Romania | 13–6 | Bulgaria | Tal-Qroqq Sports Complex, Gżira; Referees: Ruben Sap (NED), Richard Noach (GER) |
| 3 September 2025; 13:00 | Report | Score by quarters: 3–1, 4–2, 3–1, 3–2 | | | Tal-Qroqq Sports Complex, Gżira; Referees: Ruben Sap (NED), Richard Noach (GER) |
| 3 September 2025; 13:00 | Report | Novacean 4 | Goals | Todorova 2 | Tal-Qroqq Sports Complex, Gżira; Referees: Ruben Sap (NED), Richard Noach (GER) |

== 17th–19th place classification ==
| Pos | Team | Pld | W | PSW | PSL | L | GF | GA | GD | Pts |
|---|---|---|---|---|---|---|---|---|---|---|
| 17 | Ireland | 2 | 2 | 0 | 0 | 0 | 25 | 14 | +11 | 6 |
| 18 | Switzerland | 2 | 1 | 0 | 0 | 1 | 20 | 17 | +3 | 3 |
| 19 | Bulgaria | 2 | 0 | 0 | 0 | 2 | 15 | 29 | −14 | 0 |

Source: microplustimingservices.com
Rules for classification: 1) points; 2) head-to-head points; 3) head-to-head goal difference; 4) head-to-head number of goals scored; 5) Goal difference.

| 4 September 2025; 9:00 | Report | Ireland | 15–8 | Bulgaria | Tal-Qroqq Sports Complex, Gżira; Referees: Connor Jukes (GBR), Jakub Necas (CZE) |
| 4 September 2025; 9:00 | Report | Score by quarters: 3–0, 4–2, 3–2, 5–4 | | | Tal-Qroqq Sports Complex, Gżira; Referees: Connor Jukes (GBR), Jakub Necas (CZE) |
| 4 September 2025; 9:00 | Report | Connery, Hennessy 4 | Goals | Todorova 5 | Tal-Qroqq Sports Complex, Gżira; Referees: Connor Jukes (GBR), Jakub Necas (CZE) |

| 5 September 2025; 8:30 | Report | Switzerland | 14–7 | Bulgaria | Tal-Qroqq Sports Complex, Gżira; Referees: Marco Ercoli (ITA), Stefan Licari (MLT) |
| 5 September 2025; 8:30 | Report | Score by quarters: 4–2, 2–1, 5–0, 3–4 | | | Tal-Qroqq Sports Complex, Gżira; Referees: Marco Ercoli (ITA), Stefan Licari (MLT) |
| 5 September 2025; 8:30 | Report | Stucki 5 | Goals | three players 2 | Tal-Qroqq Sports Complex, Gżira; Referees: Marco Ercoli (ITA), Stefan Licari (MLT) |

| 6 September 2025; 9:00 | Report | Ireland | 10–6 | Switzerland | Tal-Qroqq Sports Complex, Gżira; Referees: Svitlana Vyshnevska (UKR), Jakub Necas (CZE) |
| 6 September 2025; 9:00 | Report | Score by quarters: 2–1, 4–3, 2–2, 2–0 | | | Tal-Qroqq Sports Complex, Gżira; Referees: Svitlana Vyshnevska (UKR), Jakub Necas (CZE) |
| 6 September 2025; 9:00 | Report | Casserly 7 | Goals | Arnold, Stucki 2 | Tal-Qroqq Sports Complex, Gżira; Referees: Svitlana Vyshnevska (UKR), Jakub Necas (CZE) |

== Brackets ==
=== Main bracket ===
Crossovers
4 September
A4 Turkey | 13
C1 Serbia | 16
4 September
B3 Croatia | 19
D2 Slovakia | 5
4 September
A3 Netherlands | 12
C2 Germany | 11
4 September
B4 Israel | 13
D1 Great Britain | 9

Quarterfinals
5 September
B1 Spain | 19
C1 Serbia | 4
5 September
A2 Hungary | 15
B3 Croatia | 11
5 September
B2 Greece | 18
A3 Netherlands | 9
5 September
A1 Italy | 18
B4 Israel | 7

Semifinals
6 September
B1 Spain | 18
A2 Hungary | 14
6 September
B2 Greece | 18
A1 Italy | 10

Final
7 September
B1 Spain | 10
B2 Greece | 9
Third place game
7 September
A2 Hungary | 15
A1 Italy | 11

=== 5th place bracket ===
5th–8th place semifinals
6 September
C1 Serbia | 8
B3 Croatia | 13
6 September
A3 Netherlands | 15
B4 Israel | 10

Fifth place game
7 September
B3 Croatia | 9
A3 Netherlands | 11
Seventh place game
7 September
C1 Serbia | 14
B4 Israel | 9

=== 9th place bracket ===
9th–12th place semifinals
5 September
A4 Turkey | 9
D2 Slovakia | 6
5 September
C2 Germany | 11
D1 Great Britain | 10

Ninth place game
6 September
A4 Turkey | 14
C2 Germany | 9
Eleventh place game
6 September
D2 Slovakia | 6
D1 Great Britain | 13

=== 13th place bracket ===
13th–16th place semifinals
4 September
D3 Czech Republic | 17
C4 Ukraine | 16
4 September
D4 Romania | 9
C3 Malta | 12

Thirteenth place game
5 September
D3 Czech Republic | 16
C3 Malta | 11
Fifteenth place game
5 September
C4 Ukraine | 9
D4 Romania | 5

== Knockout stage ==
=== 13th–16th place semifinals ===
| 4 September 2025; 10:30 | Report | Czech Republic | 17–16 (PSO) | Ukraine | Tal-Qroqq Sports Complex, Gżira; Referees: Jurjaj Mudroch (SUI), Richard Noach (GER) |
| 4 September 2025; 10:30 | Report | Score by quarters: 4–2, 5–5, 1–2, 4–5 PSO: 3–2 | | | Tal-Qroqq Sports Complex, Gżira; Referees: Jurjaj Mudroch (SUI), Richard Noach (GER) |
| 4 September 2025; 10:30 | Report | Chodlova 5 | Goals | Rudnyk 4 | Tal-Qroqq Sports Complex, Gżira; Referees: Jurjaj Mudroch (SUI), Richard Noach (GER) |

| 4 September 2025; 12:00 | Report | Romania | 9–12 | Malta | Tal-Qroqq Sports Complex, Gżira; Referees: Marco Ercoli (ITA), Risto Damchevski (BUL) |
| 4 September 2025; 12:00 | Report | Score by quarters: 1–3, 2–3, 4–3, 2–3 | | | Tal-Qroqq Sports Complex, Gżira; Referees: Marco Ercoli (ITA), Risto Damchevski (BUL) |
| 4 September 2025; 12:00 | Report | Samuel 3 | Goals | C. Amato, Cutajar 3 | Tal-Qroqq Sports Complex, Gżira; Referees: Marco Ercoli (ITA), Risto Damchevski (BUL) |

==== Fifteenth place game ====
| 5 September 2025; 10:00 | Report | Ukraine | 9–5 | Romania | Tal-Qroqq Sports Complex, Gżira; Referees: Ivanka Krstonosic Rakovic (SRB), Ruben Sap (NED) |
| 5 September 2025; 10:00 | Report | Score by quarters: 1–1, 2–1, 4–1, 2–2 | | | Tal-Qroqq Sports Complex, Gżira; Referees: Ivanka Krstonosic Rakovic (SRB), Ruben Sap (NED) |
| 5 September 2025; 10:00 | Report | three players 2 | Goals | Elisei 2 | Tal-Qroqq Sports Complex, Gżira; Referees: Ivanka Krstonosic Rakovic (SRB), Ruben Sap (NED) |

==== Thirteenth place game ====
| 5 September 2025; 11:30 | Report | Czech Republic | 16–11 | Malta | Tal-Qroqq Sports Complex, Gżira; Referees: Martina Kunikova (SVK), Karl Wilkes (IRL) |
| 5 September 2025; 11:30 | Report | Score by quarters: 4–4, 2–2, 5–1, 5–4 | | | Tal-Qroqq Sports Complex, Gżira; Referees: Martina Kunikova (SVK), Karl Wilkes (IRL) |
| 5 September 2025; 11:30 | Report | Chodlova, Svitakova 4 | Goals | Schembri 4 | Tal-Qroqq Sports Complex, Gżira; Referees: Martina Kunikova (SVK), Karl Wilkes (IRL) |

=== Crossovers ===
| 4 September 2025; 16:00 | Report | Turkey | 13–16 | Serbia | Tal-Qroqq Sports Complex, Gżira; Referees: Ruben Sap (NED), Stefan Licari (MLT) |
| 4 September 2025; 16:00 | Report | Score by quarters: 1–5, 5–2, 2–6, 5–3 | | | Tal-Qroqq Sports Complex, Gżira; Referees: Ruben Sap (NED), Stefan Licari (MLT) |
| 4 September 2025; 16:00 | Report | Arik, Yuksel 3 | Goals | Radonjic 4 | Tal-Qroqq Sports Complex, Gżira; Referees: Ruben Sap (NED), Stefan Licari (MLT) |

| 4 September 2025; 17:30 | Report | Netherlands | 12–11 | Germany | Tal-Qroqq Sports Complex, Gżira; Referees: Matan Schwartz (ISR), Karl Wilkes (IRL) |
| 4 September 2025; 17:30 | Report | Score by quarters: 1–3, 3–1, 5–4, 3–3 | | | Tal-Qroqq Sports Complex, Gżira; Referees: Matan Schwartz (ISR), Karl Wilkes (IRL) |
| 4 September 2025; 17:30 | Report | De Gier, Van de Linder 4 | Goals | Dzaka 3 | Tal-Qroqq Sports Complex, Gżira; Referees: Matan Schwartz (ISR), Karl Wilkes (IRL) |

| 4 September 2025; 19:00 | Report | Israel | 13–9 | Great Britain | Tal-Qroqq Sports Complex, Gżira; Referees: Lea Saftic (CRO), Martina Kunikova (SVK) |
| 4 September 2025; 19:00 | Report | Score by quarters: 3–1, 3–2, 3–4, 4–2 | | | Tal-Qroqq Sports Complex, Gżira; Referees: Lea Saftic (CRO), Martina Kunikova (SVK) |
| 4 September 2025; 19:00 | Report | Koren 5 | Goals | Perkins, Ross 3 | Tal-Qroqq Sports Complex, Gżira; Referees: Lea Saftic (CRO), Martina Kunikova (SVK) |

| 4 September 2025; 20:30 | Report | Croatia | 19–5 | Slovakia | Tal-Qroqq Sports Complex, Gżira; Referees: Ivanka Krstonosic Rakovic (SRB), Manuel Manea (ROU) |
| 4 September 2025; 20:30 | Report | Score by quarters: 5–2, 5–1, 4–1, 5–1 | | | Tal-Qroqq Sports Complex, Gżira; Referees: Ivanka Krstonosic Rakovic (SRB), Manuel Manea (ROU) |
| 4 September 2025; 20:30 | Report | N. Jankovic 7 | Goals | five players 1 | Tal-Qroqq Sports Complex, Gżira; Referees: Ivanka Krstonosic Rakovic (SRB), Manuel Manea (ROU) |

=== 9th–12th place semifinals ===
| 5 September 2025; 13:00 | Report | Turkey | 9–6 | Slovakia | Tal-Qroqq Sports Complex, Gżira; Referees: Lea Saftic (CRO), Risto Damchevski (BUL) |
| 5 September 2025; 13:00 | Report | Score by quarters: 3–2, 3–2, 1–0, 2–2 | | | Tal-Qroqq Sports Complex, Gżira; Referees: Lea Saftic (CRO), Risto Damchevski (BUL) |
| 5 September 2025; 13:00 | Report | Ozdemir 4 | Goals | Kopolovets 4 | Tal-Qroqq Sports Complex, Gżira; Referees: Lea Saftic (CRO), Risto Damchevski (BUL) |

| 5 September 2025; 15:00 | Report | Germany | 11–10 | Great Britain | Tal-Qroqq Sports Complex, Gżira; Referees: Jakub Necas (CZE), Manuel Manea (ROU) |
| 5 September 2025; 15:00 | Report | Score by quarters: 3–2, 2–2, 2–3, 4–3 | | | Tal-Qroqq Sports Complex, Gżira; Referees: Jakub Necas (CZE), Manuel Manea (ROU) |
| 5 September 2025; 15:00 | Report | Lightner, Mitterbauer 3 | Goals | Blenkinship, Perkins 3 | Tal-Qroqq Sports Complex, Gżira; Referees: Jakub Necas (CZE), Manuel Manea (ROU) |

==== Eleventh place game ====
| 6 September 2025; 10:30 | Report | Slovakia | 6–13 | Great Britain | Tal-Qroqq Sports Complex, Gżira; Referees: Richard Noach (GER), Jurjaj Mudroch (SUI) |
| 6 September 2025; 10:30 | Report | Score by quarters: 1–3, 1–3, 2–4, 2–3 | | | Tal-Qroqq Sports Complex, Gżira; Referees: Richard Noach (GER), Jurjaj Mudroch (SUI) |
| 6 September 2025; 10:30 | Report | six players 1 | Goals | Perkins, Wright 4 | Tal-Qroqq Sports Complex, Gżira; Referees: Richard Noach (GER), Jurjaj Mudroch (SUI) |

==== Ninth place game ====
| 6 September 2025; 12:00 | Report | Turkey | 14–9 | Germany | Tal-Qroqq Sports Complex, Gżira; Referees: Marco Ercoli (ITA), Maria Daskalopoulou (GRE) |
| 6 September 2025; 12:00 | Report | Score by quarters: 4–2, 2–2, 5–3, 3–2 | | | Tal-Qroqq Sports Complex, Gżira; Referees: Marco Ercoli (ITA), Maria Daskalopoulou (GRE) |
| 6 September 2025; 12:00 | Report | Dabbag 4 | Goals | Politze 4 | Tal-Qroqq Sports Complex, Gżira; Referees: Marco Ercoli (ITA), Maria Daskalopoulou (GRE) |

=== Quarterfinals ===
| 5 September 2025; 16:30 | Report | Spain | 19–4 | Serbia | Tal-Qroqq Sports Complex, Gżira; Referees: Matan Schwartz (ISR), Ilkin Cakmakoglu (TUR) |
| 5 September 2025; 16:30 | Report | Score by quarters: 2–0, 6–1, 4–3, 7–0 | | | Tal-Qroqq Sports Complex, Gżira; Referees: Matan Schwartz (ISR), Ilkin Cakmakoglu (TUR) |
| 5 September 2025; 16:30 | Report | Anton 5 | Goals | Milenkovic 2 | Tal-Qroqq Sports Complex, Gżira; Referees: Matan Schwartz (ISR), Ilkin Cakmakoglu (TUR) |

| 5 September 2025; 18:00 | Report | Greece | 18–9 | Netherlands | Tal-Qroqq Sports Complex, Gżira; Referees: Jaume Teixido (ESP), Richard Noach (GER) |
| 5 September 2025; 18:00 | Report | Score by quarters: 6–1, 4–3, 3–2, 5–3 | | | Tal-Qroqq Sports Complex, Gżira; Referees: Jaume Teixido (ESP), Richard Noach (GER) |
| 5 September 2025; 18:00 | Report | Krassa 5 | Goals | three players 2 | Tal-Qroqq Sports Complex, Gżira; Referees: Jaume Teixido (ESP), Richard Noach (GER) |

| 5 September 2025; 19:30 | Report | Italy | 18–7 | Israel | Tal-Qroqq Sports Complex, Gżira; Referees: Koppany Toth (HUN), Connor Jukes (GBR) |
| 5 September 2025; 19:30 | Report | Score by quarters: 6–2, 5–1, 3–2, 4–2 | | | Tal-Qroqq Sports Complex, Gżira; Referees: Koppany Toth (HUN), Connor Jukes (GBR) |
| 5 September 2025; 19:30 | Report | Bacelle, Maninetti 3 | Goals | Amor 3 | Tal-Qroqq Sports Complex, Gżira; Referees: Koppany Toth (HUN), Connor Jukes (GBR) |

| 5 September 2025; 21:00 | Report | Hungary | 15–11 | Croatia | Tal-Qroqq Sports Complex, Gżira; Referees: Maria Daskalopoulou (GRE), Jurjaj Mudroch (SUI) |
| 5 September 2025; 21:00 | Report | Score by quarters: 4–1, 4–5, 3–2, 4–3 | | | Tal-Qroqq Sports Complex, Gżira; Referees: Maria Daskalopoulou (GRE), Jurjaj Mudroch (SUI) |
| 5 September 2025; 21:00 | Report | Kinsco 4 | Goals | N. Jankovic 5 | Tal-Qroqq Sports Complex, Gżira; Referees: Maria Daskalopoulou (GRE), Jurjaj Mudroch (SUI) |

=== 5th–8th place semifinals ===
| 6 September 2025; 16:00 | Report | Serbia | 8–13 | Croatia | Tal-Qroqq Sports Complex, Gżira; Referees: Ilkin Cakmakoglu (TUR), Risto Damchevski (BUL) |
| 6 September 2025; 16:00 | Report | Score by quarters: 1–4, 4–3, 2–4, 1–2 | | | Tal-Qroqq Sports Complex, Gżira; Referees: Ilkin Cakmakoglu (TUR), Risto Damchevski (BUL) |
| 6 September 2025; 16:00 | Report | Radonjic 5 | Goals | N. Jankovic 5 | Tal-Qroqq Sports Complex, Gżira; Referees: Ilkin Cakmakoglu (TUR), Risto Damchevski (BUL) |

| 6 September 2025; 17:30 | Report | Netherlands | 15–10 | Israel | Tal-Qroqq Sports Complex, Gżira; Referees: Jaume Teixido (ESP), Koppany Toth (HUN) |
| 6 September 2025; 17:30 | Report | Score by quarters: 3–1, 3–4, 7–1, 2–4 | | | Tal-Qroqq Sports Complex, Gżira; Referees: Jaume Teixido (ESP), Koppany Toth (HUN) |
| 6 September 2025; 17:30 | Report | De Gier 4 | Goals | Dorfman 5 | Tal-Qroqq Sports Complex, Gżira; Referees: Jaume Teixido (ESP), Koppany Toth (HUN) |

==== Seventh place game ====
| 7 September 2025; 16:00 | Report | Serbia | 14–9 | Israel | Tal-Qroqq Sports Complex, Gżira; Referees: Maria Daskalopoulou (GRE), Manuel Manea (ROU) |
| 7 September 2025; 16:00 | Report | Score by quarters: 4–1, 6–3, 1–4, 3–1 | | | Tal-Qroqq Sports Complex, Gżira; Referees: Maria Daskalopoulou (GRE), Manuel Manea (ROU) |
| 7 September 2025; 16:00 | Report | Cuk 3 | Goals | three players 2 | Tal-Qroqq Sports Complex, Gżira; Referees: Maria Daskalopoulou (GRE), Manuel Manea (ROU) |

==== Fifth place game ====
| 7 September 2025; 17:30 | Report | Croatia | 9–11 | Netherlands | Tal-Qroqq Sports Complex, Gżira; Referees: Marco Ercoli (ITA), Risto Damchevski (BUL) |
| 7 September 2025; 17:30 | Report | Score by quarters: 3–2, 1–2, 1–4, 4–3 | | | Tal-Qroqq Sports Complex, Gżira; Referees: Marco Ercoli (ITA), Risto Damchevski (BUL) |
| 7 September 2025; 17:30 | Report | N. Jankovic 5 | Goals | Heerink 5 | Tal-Qroqq Sports Complex, Gżira; Referees: Marco Ercoli (ITA), Risto Damchevski (BUL) |

=== Semifinals ===
| 6 September 2025; 19:00 | Report | Spain | 18–14 | Hungary | Tal-Qroqq Sports Complex, Gżira; Referees: Lea Saftic (CRO), Stefan Licari (MLT) |
| 6 September 2025; 19:00 | Report | Score by quarters: 0–3, 10–5, 5–5, 3–1 | | | Tal-Qroqq Sports Complex, Gżira; Referees: Lea Saftic (CRO), Stefan Licari (MLT) |
| 6 September 2025; 19:00 | Report | Anton, Tutusaus Larrosa 4 | Goals | Kinsco 4 | Tal-Qroqq Sports Complex, Gżira; Referees: Lea Saftic (CRO), Stefan Licari (MLT) |

| 6 September 2025; 20:30 | Report | Greece | 18–10 | Italy | Tal-Qroqq Sports Complex, Gżira; Referees: Ivanka Krstonosic Rakovic (SRB), Matan Schwartz (ISR) |
| 6 September 2025; 20:30 | Report | Score by quarters: 6–4, 4–2, 5–3, 3–1 | | | Tal-Qroqq Sports Complex, Gżira; Referees: Ivanka Krstonosic Rakovic (SRB), Matan Schwartz (ISR) |
| 6 September 2025; 20:30 | Report | Krassa 6 | Goals | Minuto 3 | Tal-Qroqq Sports Complex, Gżira; Referees: Ivanka Krstonosic Rakovic (SRB), Matan Schwartz (ISR) |

==== Third place game ====
| 7 September 2025; 19:00 | Report | Hungary | 15–11 | Italy | Tal-Qroqq Sports Complex, Gżira; Referees: Ivanka Krstonosic Rakovic (SRB), Jaume Teixido (ESP) |
| 7 September 2025; 19:00 | Report | Score by quarters: 3–3, 5–3, 2–5, 5–0 | | | Tal-Qroqq Sports Complex, Gżira; Referees: Ivanka Krstonosic Rakovic (SRB), Jaume Teixido (ESP) |
| 7 September 2025; 19:00 | Report | Kinsco 5 | Goals | Bianco 4 | Tal-Qroqq Sports Complex, Gżira; Referees: Ivanka Krstonosic Rakovic (SRB), Jaume Teixido (ESP) |

==== Final ====
| 7 September 2025; 20:30 | Report | Spain | 10–9 | Greece | Tal-Qroqq Sports Complex, Gżira; Referees: Marina Kunikova (SVK), Ruben Sap (NED) |
| 7 September 2025; 20:30 | Report | Score by quarters: 2–4, 2–1, 4–1, 2–3 | | | Tal-Qroqq Sports Complex, Gżira; Referees: Marina Kunikova (SVK), Ruben Sap (NED) |
| 7 September 2025; 20:30 | Report | ten players 1 | Goals | Karagianni 4 | Tal-Qroqq Sports Complex, Gżira; Referees: Marina Kunikova (SVK), Ruben Sap (NED) |

== Final standings ==
| Rank | Team |
|---|---|
| 1st place, gold medalist(s) | Spain |
| 2nd place, silver medalist(s) | Greece |
| 3rd place, bronze medalist(s) | Hungary |
| 4 | Italy |
| 5 | Netherlands |
| 6 | Croatia |
| 7 | Serbia |
| 8 | Israel |
| 9 | Turkey |
| 10 | Germany |
| 11 | Great Britain |
| 12 | Slovakia |
| 13 | Czech Republic |
| 14 | Malta |
| 15 | Ukraine |
| 16 | Romania |
| 17 | Ireland |
| 18 | Switzerland |
| 19 | Bulgaria |

== See also ==
- 2025 Men's European U-18 Water Polo Championship
- 2025 Men's European U-18 Water Polo Championship Division I
- 2025 Men's European U-16 Water Polo Championship
- 2025 Women's European U-16 Water Polo Championship
