= European Aquatics U18 Water Polo Championship =

International youth water polo competition

- Sport: Water polo
- Founded: 1983
- Organizing body: European Aquatics
- Divisions: 2
- No. of teams: 16 (Elite division)
- Continent: Europe
- Most recent champions: Men: Montenegro (3rd title); Women: Spain (3rd title)
- Most titles: Men: Serbia (7 titles); Women: Russia (6 titles)
- Related competitions: European Aquatics U16 Water Polo Championship; European Aquatics U20 Water Polo Championship

The European Aquatics U18 Water Polo Championship, previously known as the LEN European Junior Water Polo Championship, is a continental water polo tournament held every two years for the players under the age of 18. In 2025, the age category was changed from U17 to U18.

== Age categories ==
Men

- European Youth Championship (U18) : 1983–2007 & 2025–
- European Junior Championship (U17) : 2008–2023

Women

- European Junior Championship (U18) : 2001–2007 & 2025–
- European Youth Championship (U17) : 2008–2023

== Men's tournament ==
=== History ===
European U18 Championships

1983 (Istanbul, Turkey): Hungary

1985 (La Valetta, Malta): USSR

1987 (Athens, Greece): Yugoslavia

1989 (Istanbul, Turkey): Hungary

1991: not held

1993 (Veenendaal, Netherlands): Hungary

1995 (Esslingen, Germany): Yugoslavia

1997 (Maribor, Slovenia): Hungary

1999 (Sofia, Bulgaria): Croatia

2001 (Hagen, Germany): Hungary

Year	Host	(gold) Gold	(silver) Silver	(bronze) Bronze
2003	Istanbul, Turkey	Serbia and Montenegro	Hungary	Croatia
2005	Sofia, Bulgaria	Serbia and Montenegro	Croatia	Hungary
2007	Gżira, Malta	Serbia	Hungary	Croatia
Men's European U-17 Water Polo Championship
2008	Belgrade, Serbia	Hungary	Serbia	Croatia
2009	Chania, Greece	Croatia	Montenegro	Serbia
2011	Rijeka, Croatia	Croatia	Italy	Spain
2013	Gżira, Malta	Montenegro	Serbia	Italy
2015; Details	Baku, Azerbaijan	Serbia	Spain	Greece
2017; Details	Gżira, Malta	Montenegro	Spain	Hungary
2019; Details	(Georgia (country)); Tbilisi, Georgia	Italy	Spain	Hungary
2021; Details	Gżira, Malta	Serbia	Greece	Hungary
2023; Details	Manisa, Turkey	Greece	Serbia	Spain
Men's European U-18 Water Polo Championship
2025; Details	Oradea, Romania	Montenegro	Serbia	Greece

=== Medal table ===
Rank	Nation	Gold	Silver	Bronze	Total
1	Serbia (Note: LEN recognizes Serbia as the successor team of Yugoslavia and Serbia and Montenegro.)	7	6	2	15
2	Hungary	6	4	5	15
3	Croatia	3	3	4	10
4	Montenegro	3	1	0	4
5	Italy	2	2	4	8
6	Greece	1	3	3	7
7	Russia (Note: LEN recognizes Russia as the successor team of Soviet Union.)	1	1	0	2
8	Spain	0	3	4	7
9	Germany	0	0	1	1
Totals (9 entries)		23	23	23	69

=== Division I ===
Year	Host	(gold) Gold	(silver) Silver	(bronze) Bronze
2025; Details	Rio Maior, Portugal	Israel	Belgium	Bulgaria

== Women's tournament ==
=== History ===
European Youth Championship (U18)

2001, Jul 08-16 Manchester GBR GRE 8:6 CZE RUS

2003, Aug 02-10 Emmen NED RUS 11:6 HUN ITA

2005, Jul 30 - Aug 06 Porto POR RUS 16:8 HUN NED

2007, Aug 04-12 Chania GRE RUS 15:14p ITA ESP

European Youth Championship (U17)

2008, Aug 03-10 Győr HUN ITA 10:7 HUN RUS

European Junior Championship (U18)

2010, Jul 25 - Aug 01 Dneprozerzhinsk UKR RUS

Year	Host	(gold) Gold	(silver) Silver	(bronze) Bronze
2011	Madrid, Spain	Greece	Hungary	Spain
2013	Istanbul, Turkey	Greece	Spain	Netherlands
2015; Details	Baku, Azerbaijan	Russia	Spain	Greece
2017; Details	Novi Sad, Serbia	Spain	Netherlands	Hungary
2019; Details	Volos, Greece	Spain	Russia	Italy
2021; Details	Šibenik, Croatia	Russia	Greece	Hungary
2023; Details	Manisa, Turkey	Hungary	Spain	Greece
Women's European U-18 Water Polo Championship
2025; Details	Gżira, Malta	Spain	Greece	Hungary

=== Medal table ===
Rank	Nation	Gold	Silver	Bronze	Total
1	Russia	6	1	2	9
2	Spain	3	4	2	9
3	Greece	3	2	2	7
4	Hungary	1	4	4	9
5	Italy	1	1	2	4
6	Netherlands	0	1	2	3
7	Czech Republic	0	1	0	1
Totals (7 entries)		14	14	14	42

== See also ==
- European Aquatics U16 Water Polo Championship
- European Aquatics U20 Water Polo Championship
