= 2025 Men's European U-18 Water Polo Championship Division I =

Youth men's water polo tournament

Tournament details
- Host country: Portugal
- City: Rio Maior
- Venue: 1 (in 1 host city)
- Dates: 18–24 August 2025
- Teams: 14 (from 1 confederation)

Final positions
- Champions: Israel (1st title)
- Runners-up: Belgium
- Third place: Bulgaria
- Fourth place: Portugal

Official website
- European Aquatics

The 2025 Men's European U-18 Water Polo Championship Division I was the inaugural edition of the second tier of the Men's European U-18 Water Polo Championships, organized by the European Aquatics. The tournament was played in Rio Maior, Portugal from 18 to 24 August 2025.

Israel won the tournament and, along with second-placed Belgium, promoted to the 2027 Elite Division.

== Host selection ==
Rio Maior was given the hosting rights on 13 November 2024.

== Participating teams ==
Teams that have registered their U18 national team but didn't compete in the 2023 U17 European Championship take part in the tournament. After the draw, Finland withdrew.

Teams
Austria
Belgium
Bulgaria
Czechia
Denmark
~~Finland~~
Great Britain
Ireland
Israel
Lithuania
Moldova
Portugal
Slovakia
Switzerland

== Venue ==
The venue is the Rio Maior Sports Centre in Rio Maior.

2025 Men's European U-18 Water Polo Championship Division I is located in Portugal	Rio Maior
2025 Men's European U-18 Water Polo Championship Division I is located in Portugal	Rio Maior Sports Centre
2025 Men's European U-18 Water Polo Championship Division I is located in Portugal	Capacity:

== Draw ==
The draw was held on 7 February 2025 at 10:30 CET in Zagreb, Croatia. The seeding was based on the European rankings.

=== Seeding ===
Pot 1	Pot 2	Pot 3	Pot 4
Slovakia; Israel; Bulgaria; Lithuania	Switzerland; Great Britain; Czechia; Portugal	~~Finland~~; Ireland; Moldova; Belgium	Austria; Denmark

== Preliminary round ==
The schedule was announced on 6 August 2025.

All times are local (Western European Summer Time; UTC+1).

=== Group A ===
Pos	Team	Pld	W	PSW	PSL	L	GF	GA	GD	Pts	Qualification
1	Moldova	2	2	0	0	0	35	20	+15	6	Quarterfinals
2	Slovakia	2	1	0	0	1	27	25	+2	3	Crossovers
3	Czechia	2	0	0	0	2	19	36	−17	0	Crossovers

Source: European U-18 Water Polo Division I
Rules for classification: 1) points; 2) head-to-head points; 3) head-to-head goal difference; 4) head-to-head number of goals scored; 5) Goal difference.

18 August 2025; 12:30	Report	Slovakia	11–15	Moldova	Rio Maior Sports Centre, Rio Maior; Referees: Georg Schoen (AUT), Eurico Silva (POR)
18 August 2025; 12:30	Report	Score by quarters: 4–3, 2–4, 0–4, 5–4			Rio Maior Sports Centre, Rio Maior; Referees: Georg Schoen (AUT), Eurico Silva (POR)
18 August 2025; 12:30	Report	Velsic, Luc 3	Goals	Mihaila 5	Rio Maior Sports Centre, Rio Maior; Referees: Georg Schoen (AUT), Eurico Silva (POR)

19 August 2025; 10:45	Report	Moldova	20–9	Czechia	Rio Maior Sports Centre, Rio Maior; Referees: Georg Schoen (AUT), Martin Sand Kristensen (DEN)
19 August 2025; 10:45	Report	Score by quarters: 5–1, 4–2, 6–3, 5–3			Rio Maior Sports Centre, Rio Maior; Referees: Georg Schoen (AUT), Martin Sand Kristensen (DEN)
19 August 2025; 10:45	Report	Mihaila 5	Goals	Pashkovsky 3	Rio Maior Sports Centre, Rio Maior; Referees: Georg Schoen (AUT), Martin Sand Kristensen (DEN)

20 August 2025; 19:00	Report	Czechia	10–16	Slovakia	Rio Maior Sports Centre, Rio Maior
20 August 2025; 19:00	Report	Score by quarters: 2–3, 4–2, 3–7, 1–4			Rio Maior Sports Centre, Rio Maior

=== Group B ===
Pos	Team	Pld	W	PSW	PSL	L	GF	GA	GD	Pts	Qualification
1	Bulgaria	3	3	0	0	0	74	30	+44	9	Quarterfinals
2	Switzerland	3	1	0	0	2	39	44	−5	3 (Note: HTH: Switzerland 1–1, +4 GD; Denmark 1–1, −2 GD; Ireland 1–1, −2 GD. Denmark is ahead of Ireland due to their head to head result.)	Crossovers
3	Denmark	3	1	0	0	2	28	45	−17	3	Crossovers
4	Ireland	3	1	0	0	2	33	55	−22	3	9th–13th place quarterfinal

Source: European U-18 Water Polo Division I
Rules for classification: 1) points; 2) head-to-head points; 3) head-to-head goal difference; 4) head-to-head number of goals scored; 5) Goal difference.
Notes:

18 August 2025; 17:15	Report	Bulgaria	28–8	Ireland	Rio Maior Sports Centre, Rio Maior; Referees: Robert Prelovsky (SVK), Tomas Kaseta (LTU)
18 August 2025; 17:15	Report	Score by quarters: 9–1, 9–1, 4–3, 6–3			Rio Maior Sports Centre, Rio Maior; Referees: Robert Prelovsky (SVK), Tomas Kaseta (LTU)
18 August 2025; 17:15	Report	Ganchev 8	Goals	Byrne 3	Rio Maior Sports Centre, Rio Maior; Referees: Robert Prelovsky (SVK), Tomas Kaseta (LTU)

19 August 2025; 9:00	Report	Switzerland	12–6	Denmark	Rio Maior Sports Centre, Rio Maior; Referees: Karel Dvoracek (CZE), Jonathan Richards (GBR)
19 August 2025; 9:00	Report	Score by quarters: 5–3, 2–0, 2–1, 3–2			Rio Maior Sports Centre, Rio Maior; Referees: Karel Dvoracek (CZE), Jonathan Richards (GBR)
19 August 2025; 9:00	Report	Luthi 3	Goals	Deleuran, Rankovic 3	Rio Maior Sports Centre, Rio Maior; Referees: Karel Dvoracek (CZE), Jonathan Richards (GBR)

19 August 2025; 15:30	Report	Denmark	14–10	Ireland	Rio Maior Sports Centre, Rio Maior; Referees: Tomas Kaseta (LTU), Alain D'hossche (BEL)
19 August 2025; 15:30	Report	Score by quarters: 4–3, 4–2, 4–4, 2–1			Rio Maior Sports Centre, Rio Maior; Referees: Tomas Kaseta (LTU), Alain D'hossche (BEL)
19 August 2025; 15:30	Report	Deleuran 4	Goals	Byrne 3	Rio Maior Sports Centre, Rio Maior; Referees: Tomas Kaseta (LTU), Alain D'hossche (BEL)

19 August 2025; 17:15	Report	Bulgaria	23–14	Switzerland	Rio Maior Sports Centre, Rio Maior; Referees: Eurico Silva (POR), Tal Shildan (ISR)
19 August 2025; 17:15	Report	Score by quarters: 5–5, 4–3, 7–2, 7–4			Rio Maior Sports Centre, Rio Maior; Referees: Eurico Silva (POR), Tal Shildan (ISR)
19 August 2025; 17:15	Report	Ganchev, Venov 5	Goals	Bozzo 4	Rio Maior Sports Centre, Rio Maior; Referees: Eurico Silva (POR), Tal Shildan (ISR)

20 August 2025; 09:00	Report	Bulgaria	23–8	Denmark	Rio Maior Sports Centre, Rio Maior; Referees: Georg Schoen (AUT), Jonathan Richards (GBR)
20 August 2025; 09:00	Report	Score by quarters: 3–3, 8–1, 7–3, 5–1			Rio Maior Sports Centre, Rio Maior; Referees: Georg Schoen (AUT), Jonathan Richards (GBR)
20 August 2025; 09:00	Report	Venov 7	Goals	Deleuran, Kok 2	Rio Maior Sports Centre, Rio Maior; Referees: Georg Schoen (AUT), Jonathan Richards (GBR)

20 August 2025; 10:45	Report	Switzerland	13–15	Ireland	Rio Maior Sports Centre, Rio Maior; Referees: Alain D'hossche (BEL), Tal Shildan (ISR)
20 August 2025; 10:45	Report	Score by quarters: 7–4, 1–4, 2–4, 3–3			Rio Maior Sports Centre, Rio Maior; Referees: Alain D'hossche (BEL), Tal Shildan (ISR)
20 August 2025; 10:45	Report	Ribatti, Rutz 4	Goals	Byrne 7	Rio Maior Sports Centre, Rio Maior; Referees: Alain D'hossche (BEL), Tal Shildan (ISR)

=== Group C ===
Pos	Team	Pld	W	PSW	PSL	L	GF	GA	GD	Pts	Qualification
1	Israel	3	3	0	0	0	55	32	+23	9	Quarterfinals
2	Belgium	3	2	0	0	1	52	35	+17	6	Quarterfinals
3	Great Britain	3	1	0	0	2	40	41	−1	3	Crossovers
4	Austria	3	0	0	0	3	33	72	−39	0	9th–13th place quarterfinal

Source: European U-18 Water Polo Division I
Rules for classification: 1) points; 2) head-to-head points; 3) head-to-head goal difference; 4) head-to-head number of goals scored; 5) Goal difference.

18 August 2025; 09:00	Report	Israel	14–12	Belgium	Rio Maior Sports Centre, Rio Maior; Referees: Declan McKerr (IRL), Martin Sand Kristensen (DEN)
18 August 2025; 09:00	Report	Score by quarters: 3–0, 5–3, 3–3, 3–6			Rio Maior Sports Centre, Rio Maior; Referees: Declan McKerr (IRL), Martin Sand Kristensen (DEN)
18 August 2025; 09:00	Report	Dercksen, Gal-on 3	Goals	Sergeant 4	Rio Maior Sports Centre, Rio Maior; Referees: Declan McKerr (IRL), Martin Sand Kristensen (DEN)

18 August 2025; 10:45	Report	Great Britain	20–12	Austria	Rio Maior Sports Centre, Rio Maior; Referees: Ruben Garcia (SUI), Alexandru-Andrei Mustata (ROU)
18 August 2025; 10:45	Report	Score by quarters: 4–2, 5–3, 6–5, 5–2			Rio Maior Sports Centre, Rio Maior; Referees: Ruben Garcia (SUI), Alexandru-Andrei Mustata (ROU)
18 August 2025; 10:45	Report	Mathieson 6	Goals	Hagljan, Pourazim 3	Rio Maior Sports Centre, Rio Maior; Referees: Ruben Garcia (SUI), Alexandru-Andrei Mustata (ROU)

19 August 2025; 12:30	Report	Austria	9–26	Belgium	Rio Maior Sports Centre, Rio Maior; Referees: Robert Prelovsky (SVK), Ruben Garcia (SUI)
19 August 2025; 12:30	Report	Score by quarters: 2–5, 2–6, 3–8, 2–7			Rio Maior Sports Centre, Rio Maior; Referees: Robert Prelovsky (SVK), Ruben Garcia (SUI)
19 August 2025; 12:30	Report	Hagljan, Vranjes 2	Goals	Viaene 5	Rio Maior Sports Centre, Rio Maior; Referees: Robert Prelovsky (SVK), Ruben Garcia (SUI)

19 August 2025; 14:00	Report	Israel	15–8	Great Britain	Rio Maior Sports Centre, Rio Maior; Referees: Karel Dvoracek (CZE), Risto Damchevski (MKD)
19 August 2025; 14:00	Report	Score by quarters: 3–2, 6–4, 1–0, 5–2			Rio Maior Sports Centre, Rio Maior; Referees: Karel Dvoracek (CZE), Risto Damchevski (MKD)
19 August 2025; 14:00	Report	Goshen 4	Goals	Mathieson, Bamborough 2	Rio Maior Sports Centre, Rio Maior; Referees: Karel Dvoracek (CZE), Risto Damchevski (MKD)

20 August 2025; 12:30	Report	Israel	26–12	Austria	Rio Maior Sports Centre, Rio Maior; Referees: Risto Damchevski (MKD), Martin Sand Kristensen (DEN)
20 August 2025; 12:30	Report	Score by quarters: 6–3, 8–1, 6–3, 6–5			Rio Maior Sports Centre, Rio Maior; Referees: Risto Damchevski (MKD), Martin Sand Kristensen (DEN)
20 August 2025; 12:30	Report	Mordechalevitch 6	Goals	four players 2	Rio Maior Sports Centre, Rio Maior; Referees: Risto Damchevski (MKD), Martin Sand Kristensen (DEN)

20 August 2025; 17:15	Report	Great Britain	12–14	Belgium	Rio Maior Sports Centre, Rio Maior
20 August 2025; 17:15	Report	Score by quarters: 2–3, 2–3, 2–4, 6–4			Rio Maior Sports Centre, Rio Maior

=== Group D ===
Pos	Team	Pld	W	PSW	PSL	L	GF	GA	GD	Pts	Qualification
1	Portugal (H)	1	0	1	0	0	13	13	0	2	Quarterfinals
2	Lithuania	1	0	0	1	0	13	13	0	1	Crossovers
3	~~Finland~~	0	0	0	0	0	0	0	0	0	Withdrew

Source: European U-18 Water Polo Division I
Rules for classification: 1) points; 2) head-to-head points; 3) head-to-head goal difference; 4) head-to-head number of goals scored; 5) Goal difference.
(H) Host

19 August 2025; 19:00	Report	Portugal	16–14 (PSO)	Lithuania	Rio Maior Sports Centre, Rio Maior; Referees: Alexandru-Andrei Mustata (ROU), Declan McKerr (IRL)
19 August 2025; 19:00	Report	Score by quarters: 2–4, 4–2, 2–4, 5–3 PSO: 3–1			Rio Maior Sports Centre, Rio Maior; Referees: Alexandru-Andrei Mustata (ROU), Declan McKerr (IRL)
19 August 2025; 19:00	Report	Pereira 4	Goals	Pasuk 6	Rio Maior Sports Centre, Rio Maior; Referees: Alexandru-Andrei Mustata (ROU), Declan McKerr (IRL)

== Brackets ==
=== Main bracket ===
Crossovers
21 August
D2 Lithuania	19
C3 Great Britain	14
21 August
A2 Slovakia	21
B3 Denmark	4
21 August
B2 Switzerland	9
A3 Czech Republic	8

Quarterfinals
22 August
A1 Moldova	8
C2 Belgium	9
22 August
B1 Bulgaria	21
D2 Lithuania	9
22 August
C1 Israel	15
A2 Slovakia	3
22 August
D1 Portugal	9
B2 Switzerland	8

Semifinals
23 August
C2 Belgium	16
B1 Bulgaria	15
23 August
C1 Israel	13
D1 Portugal	8

Final
24 August
C2 Belgium	9
C1 Israel	12
Third place game
24 August
B1 Bulgaria	22
D1 Portugal	13

=== 5th place bracket ===
5th–8th place semifinals
23 August
A1 Moldova	18
A2 Slovakia	13
23 August
D2 Lithuania	8
B2 Switzerland	9

Fifth place game
24 August
A1 Moldova	18
B2 Switzerland	8
Seventh place game
24 August
A2 Slovakia	8
D2 Lithuania	12

=== 9th place bracket ===
9th–13th place quarterfinal
21 August
B4 Ireland	12
C4 Austria	15

9th–12th place semifinals
22 August
B3 Denmark	9
C4 Austria	12
22 August
A3 Czech Republic	9
C3 Great Britain	12

Ninth place game
23 August
C4 Austria	12
C3 Great Britain	14
Eleventh place game
23 August
B3 Denmark	8
A3 Czech Republic	9

== Knockout stage ==
=== Crossovers ===
21 August 2025; 12:30	Report	Slovakia	21–4	Denmark	Rio Maior Sports Centre, Rio Maior; Referees: Jonathan Richards (GBR), Risto Damchevski (MKD)
21 August 2025; 12:30	Report	Score by quarters: 6–1, 8–1, 3–1, 4–1			Rio Maior Sports Centre, Rio Maior; Referees: Jonathan Richards (GBR), Risto Damchevski (MKD)
21 August 2025; 12:30	Report	Luc, Velsic 5	Goals	four players 1	Rio Maior Sports Centre, Rio Maior; Referees: Jonathan Richards (GBR), Risto Damchevski (MKD)

21 August 2025; 17:15	Report	Switzerland	9–8	Czech Republic	Rio Maior Sports Centre, Rio Maior; Referees: Declan McKerr (IRL), Alexandru-Andrei Mustata (ROU)
21 August 2025; 17:15	Report	Score by quarters: 4–2, 2–1, 3–2, 0–3			Rio Maior Sports Centre, Rio Maior; Referees: Declan McKerr (IRL), Alexandru-Andrei Mustata (ROU)
21 August 2025; 17:15	Report	Luthi 3	Goals	Pashkovsky 3	Rio Maior Sports Centre, Rio Maior; Referees: Declan McKerr (IRL), Alexandru-Andrei Mustata (ROU)

21 August 2025; 19:00	Report	Lithuania	19–14	Great Britain	Rio Maior Sports Centre, Rio Maior; Referees: Robert Prelovsky (SVK), Georg Schoen (AUT)
21 August 2025; 19:00	Report	Score by quarters: 3–5, 8–4, 6–1, 2–4			Rio Maior Sports Centre, Rio Maior; Referees: Robert Prelovsky (SVK), Georg Schoen (AUT)
21 August 2025; 19:00	Report	Andrejaitis 7	Goals	Mathieson 5	Rio Maior Sports Centre, Rio Maior; Referees: Robert Prelovsky (SVK), Georg Schoen (AUT)

=== 9th–13th place quarterfinal ===
21 August 2025; 10:45	Report	Ireland	12–15	Austria	Rio Maior Sports Centre, Rio Maior; Referees: Alain D'Hossche (BEL), Eurico Silva (POR)
21 August 2025; 10:45	Report	Score by quarters: 1–2, 5–4, 2–3, 4–6			Rio Maior Sports Centre, Rio Maior; Referees: Alain D'Hossche (BEL), Eurico Silva (POR)
21 August 2025; 10:45	Report	M. Cunningham Smyth, P. Cunningham Smyth 4	Goals	Pourazim 5	Rio Maior Sports Centre, Rio Maior; Referees: Alain D'Hossche (BEL), Eurico Silva (POR)

=== 9th–12th place semifinals ===
22 August 2025; 9:00	Report	Denmark	9–12 (PSO)	Austria	Rio Maior Sports Centre, Rio Maior; Referees: Tomas Kaseta (LTU), Alain D'Hossche (BEL)
22 August 2025; 9:00	Report	Score by quarters: 3–2, 4–1, 0–2, 4–4 PSO: 0–3			Rio Maior Sports Centre, Rio Maior; Referees: Tomas Kaseta (LTU), Alain D'Hossche (BEL)
22 August 2025; 9:00	Report	Kok 5	Goals	three players 2	Rio Maior Sports Centre, Rio Maior; Referees: Tomas Kaseta (LTU), Alain D'Hossche (BEL)

22 August 2025; 10:45	Report	Czech Republic	9–12	Great Britain	Rio Maior Sports Centre, Rio Maior; Referees: Ruben Garcia (SUI), Tal Shildan (ISR)
22 August 2025; 10:45	Report	Score by quarters: 1–5, 4–2, 2–2, 2–3			Rio Maior Sports Centre, Rio Maior; Referees: Ruben Garcia (SUI), Tal Shildan (ISR)
22 August 2025; 10:45	Report	Pribyl 4	Goals	Mathieson 5	Rio Maior Sports Centre, Rio Maior; Referees: Ruben Garcia (SUI), Tal Shildan (ISR)

==== Eleventh place game ====
23 August 2025; 9:00	Report	Denmark	8–9	Czech Republic	Rio Maior Sports Centre, Rio Maior; Referees: Ruben Garcia(SUI), Georg Schoen (AUT)
23 August 2025; 9:00	Report	Score by quarters: 3–1, 4–2, 0–5, 1–1			Rio Maior Sports Centre, Rio Maior; Referees: Ruben Garcia(SUI), Georg Schoen (AUT)
23 August 2025; 9:00	Report	Hansen, Houmolle 2	Goals	Pashkovsky 3	Rio Maior Sports Centre, Rio Maior; Referees: Ruben Garcia(SUI), Georg Schoen (AUT)

==== Ninth place game ====
23 August 2025; 10:45	Report	Austria	12–14	Great Britain	Rio Maior Sports Centre, Rio Maior; Referees: Martin Sand Kristensen (DEN), Eurico Silva (POR)
23 August 2025; 10:45	Report	Score by quarters: 1–3, 3–3, 5–4, 3–4			Rio Maior Sports Centre, Rio Maior; Referees: Martin Sand Kristensen (DEN), Eurico Silva (POR)
23 August 2025; 10:45	Report	Pourazim 5	Goals	Bamborough 5	Rio Maior Sports Centre, Rio Maior; Referees: Martin Sand Kristensen (DEN), Eurico Silva (POR)

=== Quarterfinals ===
22 August 2025; 12:30	Report	Moldova	8–9	Belgium	Rio Maior Sports Centre, Rio Maior; Referees: Jonathan Richards (GBR), Eurico Silva (POR)
22 August 2025; 12:30	Report	Score by quarters: 2–2, 2–2, 2–3, 2–2			Rio Maior Sports Centre, Rio Maior; Referees: Jonathan Richards (GBR), Eurico Silva (POR)
22 August 2025; 12:30	Report	Mihaila 3	Goals	Sergeant 4	Rio Maior Sports Centre, Rio Maior; Referees: Jonathan Richards (GBR), Eurico Silva (POR)

22 August 2025; 15:30	Report	Bulgaria	21–9	Lithuania	Rio Maior Sports Centre, Rio Maior; Referees: Robert Prelovsky (SVK), Martin Sand Kristensen (DEN)
22 August 2025; 15:30	Report	Score by quarters: 3–1, 6–0, 6–4, 6–4			Rio Maior Sports Centre, Rio Maior; Referees: Robert Prelovsky (SVK), Martin Sand Kristensen (DEN)
22 August 2025; 15:30	Report	Jarmolkovic, Siliunas 5	Goals	Venov 3	Rio Maior Sports Centre, Rio Maior; Referees: Robert Prelovsky (SVK), Martin Sand Kristensen (DEN)

22 August 2025; 17:15	Report	Israel	15–3	Slovakia	Rio Maior Sports Centre, Rio Maior; Referees: Risto Damchevski (MKD), Declan McKerr (IRL)
22 August 2025; 17:15	Report	Score by quarters: 3–0, 6–1, 2–1, 4–1			Rio Maior Sports Centre, Rio Maior; Referees: Risto Damchevski (MKD), Declan McKerr (IRL)
22 August 2025; 17:15	Report	Hemsi 5	Goals	Cebo 2	Rio Maior Sports Centre, Rio Maior; Referees: Risto Damchevski (MKD), Declan McKerr (IRL)

22 August 2025; 19:00	Report	Portugal	9–8	Switzerland	Rio Maior Sports Centre, Rio Maior; Referees: Alexandru-Andrei Mustata (ROU), Karel Dvoracek (CZE)
22 August 2025; 19:00	Report	Score by quarters: 1–2, 3–1, 1–3, 4–2			Rio Maior Sports Centre, Rio Maior; Referees: Alexandru-Andrei Mustata (ROU), Karel Dvoracek (CZE)
22 August 2025; 19:00	Report	Ferras, Monteiro 3	Goals	Luthi 2	Rio Maior Sports Centre, Rio Maior; Referees: Alexandru-Andrei Mustata (ROU), Karel Dvoracek (CZE)

=== 5th–8th place semifinals ===
23 August 2025; 12:30	Report	Moldova	18–13	Slovakia	Rio Maior Sports Centre, Rio Maior; Referees: Alain D'Hossche (BEL), Risto Damchevski (MKD)
23 August 2025; 12:30	Report	Score by quarters: 5–2, 6–1, 3–3, 4–7			Rio Maior Sports Centre, Rio Maior; Referees: Alain D'Hossche (BEL), Risto Damchevski (MKD)
23 August 2025; 12:30	Report	Milhalachi 4	Goals	Matovcik 4	Rio Maior Sports Centre, Rio Maior; Referees: Alain D'Hossche (BEL), Risto Damchevski (MKD)

23 August 2025; 15:30	Report	Lithuania	8–9	Switzerland	Rio Maior Sports Centre, Rio Maior; Referees: Tal Shildan (ISR), Jonathan Richards (GBR)
23 August 2025; 15:30	Report	Score by quarters: 2–2, 3–1, 2–4, 1–2			Rio Maior Sports Centre, Rio Maior; Referees: Tal Shildan (ISR), Jonathan Richards (GBR)
23 August 2025; 15:30	Report	Jarmolkovic, Pasuk 3	Goals	Luthi 3	Rio Maior Sports Centre, Rio Maior; Referees: Tal Shildan (ISR), Jonathan Richards (GBR)

==== Seventh place game ====
24 August 2025; 9:00	Report	Slovakia	8–12	Lithuania	Rio Maior Sports Centre, Rio Maior; Referees: Ruben Garcia (SUI), Jonathan Richards (GBR)
24 August 2025; 9:00	Report	Score by quarters: 2–2, 1–4, 1–2, 4–4			Rio Maior Sports Centre, Rio Maior; Referees: Ruben Garcia (SUI), Jonathan Richards (GBR)
24 August 2025; 9:00	Report	Cebo, Simkovic 3	Goals	Pasuk 4	Rio Maior Sports Centre, Rio Maior; Referees: Ruben Garcia (SUI), Jonathan Richards (GBR)

==== Fifth place game ====
24 August 2025; 10:45	Report	Moldova	18–8	Switzerland	Rio Maior Sports Centre, Rio Maior; Referees: Robert Prelovsky (SVK), Karel Dvoracek (CZE)
24 August 2025; 10:45	Report	Score by quarters: 4–5, 4–0, 5–0, 5–3			Rio Maior Sports Centre, Rio Maior; Referees: Robert Prelovsky (SVK), Karel Dvoracek (CZE)
24 August 2025; 10:45	Report	Colesnicenco, Milaila 6	Goals	Rutz 3	Rio Maior Sports Centre, Rio Maior; Referees: Robert Prelovsky (SVK), Karel Dvoracek (CZE)

=== Semifinals ===
23 August 2025; 17:15	Report	Belgium	16–15 (PSO)	Bulgaria	Rio Maior Sports Centre, Rio Maior; Referees: Tomas Kaseta (LTU), Alexandru-Andrei Mustata (ROU)
23 August 2025; 17:15	Report	Score by quarters: 4–3, 2–1, 2–3, 3–4 PSO: 5–4			Rio Maior Sports Centre, Rio Maior; Referees: Tomas Kaseta (LTU), Alexandru-Andrei Mustata (ROU)
23 August 2025; 17:15	Report	Sergeant 4	Goals	Ganchev, Venov 3	Rio Maior Sports Centre, Rio Maior; Referees: Tomas Kaseta (LTU), Alexandru-Andrei Mustata (ROU)

23 August 2025; 19:00	Report	Israel	13–8	Portugal	Rio Maior Sports Centre, Rio Maior; Referees: Karel Dvoracek (CZE), Declan McKerr (IRL)
23 August 2025; 19:00	Report	Score by quarters: 3–1, 4–5, 3–2, 3–0			Rio Maior Sports Centre, Rio Maior; Referees: Karel Dvoracek (CZE), Declan McKerr (IRL)
23 August 2025; 19:00	Report	Goshen, Refaeli 3	Goals	Ferras 3	Rio Maior Sports Centre, Rio Maior; Referees: Karel Dvoracek (CZE), Declan McKerr (IRL)

==== Third place game ====
24 August 2025; 12:30	Report	Bulgaria	22–13	Portugal	Rio Maior Sports Centre, Rio Maior; Referees: Alain D'Hossche (BEL), Tal Shildan (ISR)
24 August 2025; 12:30	Report	Score by quarters: 3–1, 7–1, 7–6, 5–5			Rio Maior Sports Centre, Rio Maior; Referees: Alain D'Hossche (BEL), Tal Shildan (ISR)
24 August 2025; 12:30	Report	Ferras, Santos 3	Goals	Ganchev 8	Rio Maior Sports Centre, Rio Maior; Referees: Alain D'Hossche (BEL), Tal Shildan (ISR)

==== Final ====
24 August 2025; 15:30	Report	Belgium	9–12	Israel	Rio Maior Sports Centre, Rio Maior; Referees: Eurico Silva (POR), Risto Damchevski (MKD)
24 August 2025; 15:30	Report	Score by quarters: 2–3, 3–0, 2–5, 2–4			Rio Maior Sports Centre, Rio Maior; Referees: Eurico Silva (POR), Risto Damchevski (MKD)
24 August 2025; 15:30	Report	Durez 3	Goals	Refaeli 4	Rio Maior Sports Centre, Rio Maior; Referees: Eurico Silva (POR), Risto Damchevski (MKD)

== Final standings ==
Rank	Team
1st place, gold medalist(s)	Israel
2nd place, silver medalist(s)	Belgium
3rd place, bronze medalist(s)	Bulgaria
4	Portugal
5	Moldova
6	Switzerland
7	Lithuania
8	Slovakia
9	Great Britain
10	Austria
11	Czech Republic
12	Denmark
13	Ireland
WD	Finland

Promoted to the 2027 Men's European U-18 Water Polo Championship (Elite)

== See also ==
- 2025 Men's European U-18 Water Polo Championship
- 2025 Women's European U-18 Water Polo Championship
- 2025 Men's European U-16 Water Polo Championship
- 2025 Women's European U-16 Water Polo Championship
