= 2026 Women's European Water Polo Championship =

Water polo tournament

Campeonato Europeu de Polo Aquático de 2026 (in Portuguese)

Tournament details
- Country: Portugal
- City: Funchal
- Venue: Olympic Swimming Pool Complex
- Dates: 26 January – 5 February
- Teams: 16 (from 1 confederation)

Final positions
- Champions: Netherlands (7th title)
- Runners-up: Hungary
- Third place: Greece
- Fourth place: Italy

Tournament statistics
- Matches played: 52
- Goals scored: 1,296 (24.92 per match)
- Top scorer: (Spain) Beatriz Ortiz (25 goals)
- Most saves: (Romania) Mariia Dvorzhetska (49 saves)

Official website
- Funchal 2026

The 2026 Women's European Water Polo Championship was the 21st edition of the biannual continental championship for women's national water polo teams, organised by Europe's governing aquatics body, European Aquatics. The tournament was played from 26 January to 5 February 2026.

The competition was intended to be held in Serbia's capital Belgrade, alongside the men's championship. However, the Serbs would later relinquish the hosting rights for the women's event. On 4 July 2025, Portugal was awarded the hosting rights for the first time with Madeira's capital, Funchal, being selected as the host city. This was the second edition to have different hosts for both genders after European Aquatics made the change permanent in March 2025. This edition also witnessed a new format, introducing a second group stage as opposed to an extended knockout round.

For the second time, 16 teams were participating in the tournament, following the expansion in 2024. The top eight teams from the 2024 edition qualified automatically, while the remaining eight teams progressed via qualification. Future hosts, Portugal, and Switzerland qualified after a 10 and 31 year drought respectively.

This tournament acted as a qualifier for the 2027 World Aquatics Championships in Budapest and the 2028 European Championship edition in Eindhoven.

Netherlands were the defending champions, beating Spain, 8–7, in the final in Eindhoven. They defended their title with a 15–13 penalty shootout win over Hungary. Croatia achieved their best result, placing 6th.

== Host selection ==
- (Serbia) Belgrade

Belgrade was given the hosting rights in May 2022. This would've been Serbia's third time hosting after 2006 and 2016.

=== Hosting change ===
At a press conference in Valletta, Malta, held in June 2024, it was briefly mentioned that the bidding process had reopened for this competition, but no official statement was made at that time. It would later become official as in March 2025, it was confirmed that the men's event will be held in Belgrade but the venue for the women's tournament would be changed due to Serbia requesting that they only host the men's event.

Winning bid indicated in Bold:

- Italy (unknown city)
- **Portugal** (with Funchal as the host city)
- Spain (with Tenerife as the host city)

After that announcement, Italy and Tenerife, Spain were touted as potential hosts, but on 4 July 2025, Portugal was given the hosting rights with Funchal as the venue. This is Portugal's first time hosting the event and first time the country hosted a senior women's championship in any sport. Miguel Arrobas, President of the Portuguese Swimming Federation said the following:

"For the FPN and for Portugal, the organization of this Women's Senior European Championship is very important. It will be the first time that Portugal hosts a women's senior event in team sports. In sporting terms, this is also a commitment by the FPN to the growth of water polo and, in this case, in particular, to the women's category with this participation and organization."

== Preparations ==
- On 28 September 2025, a dedicated website went live.
- On 8 October, an information bulletin became available.

=== Tickets ===
Tickets were put on sale on 10 December 2025.

=== Partners and sponsors ===
- Delfina
- Epam
- Fluidra
- Kap Seven
- Malmsten

== Format ==
A new system was used for this tournament. The new format was unveiled in March 2025. This was the third different format in three editions.

- Group stage

The 16 teams were drawn into four groups of four teams. In each group, there were two teams from the last tournament and two teams from the qualifiers. They played a round-robin in their groups. The top two teams of each group advanced to the main round (Group A & Group C formed Group E and Group B & Group D formed Group F) with all results against the teams that advanced as well carried over. The bottom two teams were dropped to the classification round, which was played in a similar style to the main round.

- Second group stage

In the main round, the teams played against opponents from the other first-round group. From this round, the top-two ranked teams of each group advanced to the semifinals; the other teams were dropped to the 5th–8th place semifinals.

In the classification round, the teams played against opponents from the other first-round group. Then each team played one classification game for the final position.

- Knockout stage

The four remaining teams progressed to the knockout stage, where two semifinals and a final determined the European champions.

== Qualification ==
Map of qualifiers for the 2026 Women's European Water Polo Championship: Team qualified for 2026 Women's European Water Polo Championship Team failed to qualify Team banned from competition Did not enter

16 teams were able to compete at the main event. They were broken up as follows:

- The top eight teams from the 2024 European Championship not already qualified as host nation
- Final eight from the qualifiers.

Of the sixteen teams who qualified, fourteen took part in the previous edition. Switzerland returned for the first time since 1995 and did so on merit for the first time. Portugal comes back for the first time since 2016.

Of the absentees, Czechia failed to qualify after appearing in 2024, while 2024 debutants, Bulgaria, didn't enter qualification.

The lowest ranked team to qualify was future hosts Portugal, ranked 20th, while Ukraine is the highest ranked team to not qualify, placed 15th.

Event	Date	Location	Quotas	Nation(s)
2024 European Championship	5–13 January	(Netherlands) Eindhoven	8	Netherlands; Spain; Greece; Italy; Hungary; France; Great Britain; Croatia
Qualifiers	6–8 June 2025	(Portugal) Setúbal	2	Portugal; Romania
Qualifiers	6–8 June 2025	(Germany) Hannover	2	Germany; Turkey
Qualifiers	6–8 June 2025	(Serbia) Novi Sad	2	Serbia; Switzerland
Qualifiers	6–8 June 2025	(Slovakia) Nováky	2	Israel; Slovakia

=== Summary of qualified teams ===
Team	Qualification method	Date of qualification	Appearance(s)				Previous best performance (Note: Bold text indicates they hosted that edition.)	Rank
Team	Qualification method	Date of qualification	Total	First	Last	Streak	Previous best performance	Rank
Greece	Top eight in 2024	6 January 2024	19th	1989	2024	19	Runners-up (2010, 2012, 2018, 2022)	2
Italy	Top eight in 2024	6 January 2024	19th	1989	2024	19	Champions (1995, 1997, 1999, 2003, 2012)	5
Netherlands	Top eight in 2024	6 January 2024	21st	1985	2024	21	Champions (1985, 1987, 1989, 1993, 2018, 2024)	3
Spain	Top eight in 2024	6 January 2024	17th	1993	2024	17	Champions (2014, 2020, 2022)	1
Croatia	Top eight in 2024	8 January 2024	7th	2010	2024	6	Eighth place (2022, 2024)	6
France	Top eight in 2024	8 January 2024	17th	1985	2024	7	Third place (1987, 1989)	7
Great Britain	Top eight in 2024	8 January 2024	10th	1985	2024	2	Sixth place (1985)	11
Hungary	Top eight in 2024	8 January 2024	21st	1985	2024	21	Champions (1991, 2001, 2016)	4
Portugal	Top two in Group A	7 June 2025	4th	1995	2016	1	Tenth place (2016)	20
Romania	Top two in Group A	7 June 2025	3rd	2022	2024	3	Eleventh place (2022)	13
Israel	Top two in Group D	7 June 2025	5th	2018	2024	5	Sixth place (2022)	8
Slovakia	Top two in Group D	7 June 2025	5th	1993	2024	4	Eighth place (2020)	12
Germany	Top two in Group B	7 June 2025	21st	1985	2024	6	Third place (1985)	10
Turkey	Top two in Group B	7 June 2025	4th	2016	2024	2	Twelfth place (2016, 2018)	14
Serbia	Top two in Group C	7 June 2025	7th	2006	2024	6	Eighth place (2006)	9
Switzerland	Top two in Group C	8 June 2025	3rd	1993	1995	1	Tenth place (1993)	18

== Venue ==
Similar to 2016, the Štark Arena (now Belgrade Arena) was to be used for the entire competition before their withdrawal. When Funchal was confirmed as the new hosts, the Olympic Swimming Pool Complex was also announced as the venue for competition. The facility was built in 2004 and has recently hosted some Aquatics events, including the 2022 World Para Swimming Championships, 2024 World Para Swimming European Open Championships and the 2025 European Artistic Swimming Championships.

2026 Women's European Water Polo Championship is located in Madeira	Funchal
2026 Women's European Water Polo Championship is located in Madeira	Olympic Swimming Pool Complex
2026 Women's European Water Polo Championship is located in Madeira	Capacity: 850

Original venue in Serbia
2026 Women's European Water Polo Championship is located in Serbia	Belgrade
2026 Women's European Water Polo Championship is located in Serbia	Štark Arena (now Belgrade Arena)
2026 Women's European Water Polo Championship is located in Serbia	Capacity: 18,386
2026 Women's European Water Polo Championship is located in Serbia	Venue for the 2026 Men's European Water Polo Championships

== Draw ==
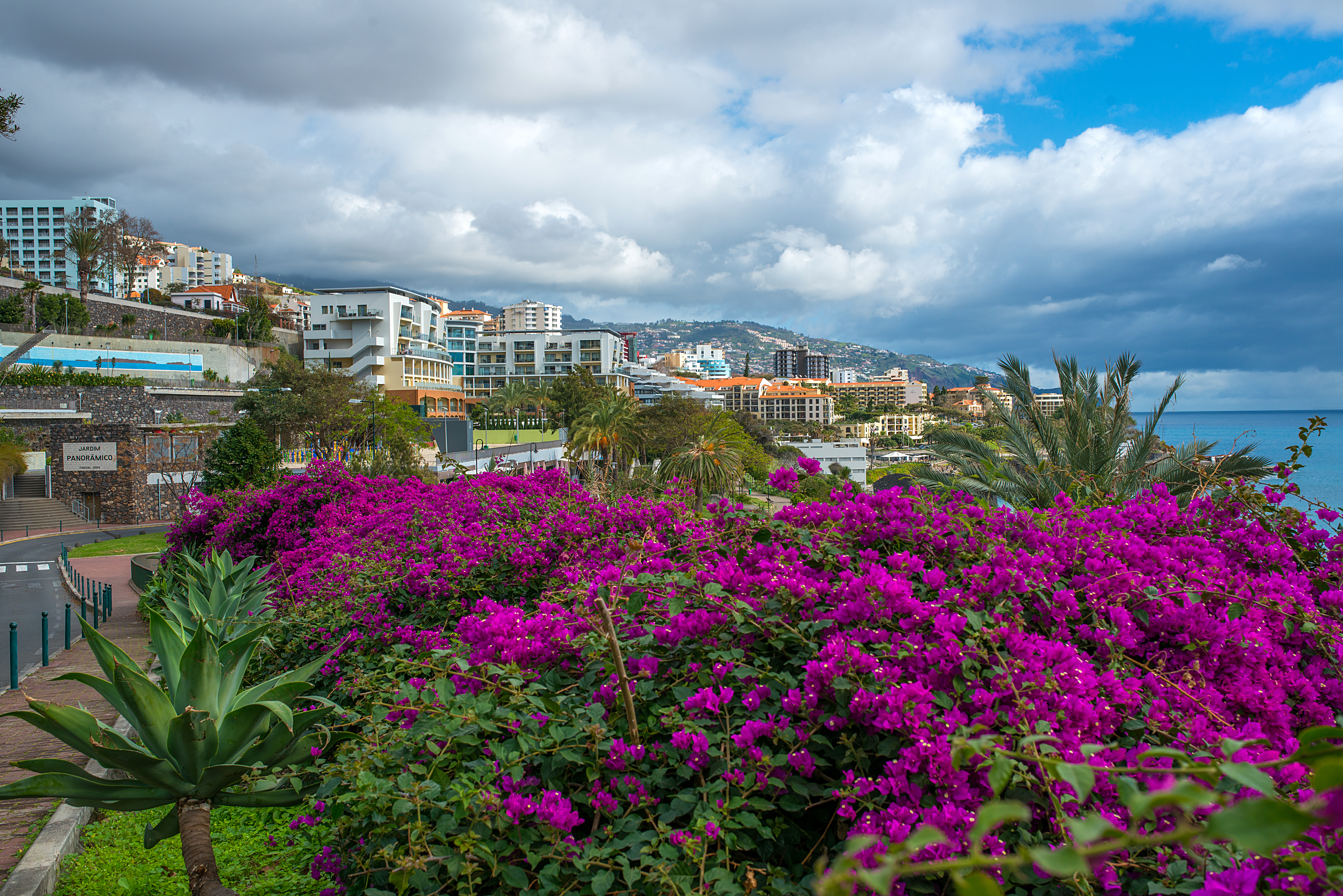
Funchal hosted the draw.

The draw was held at 11:30 WET on 2 October 2025 in Funchal, Madeira, Portugal. Before the draw began, speeches were done by Eduardo Jesus, Regional Secretary of Tourism and Culture, Miguel Arrobas, President of the Portuguese Swimming Federation, and European Aquatics president, Antonio Silva. The guests were seven-time Olympic windsurfer, João Rodrigues and Masters Swimming Champion, Susana Gomes, who assisted with the draw. The draw started with, in order, pots 1, 2, 3 and 4 being drawn, with each team selected then allocated into the first available group alphabetically. The position for the team within the group would then be drawn (for the purpose of the schedule).

=== Seeding ===
The pots were decided by the rankings of the 2024 European Championship and also of the 2026 Qualifiers.

- Pot 1 consisted of the teams positioned 1–4 in the 2024 Women's European Water Polo Championship
- Pot 2 consisted of the teams positioned 5–8 in the 2024 Women's European Water Polo Championship
- Pot 3 consisted of the group winners of the 2026 Women's European Water Polo Championship Qualifiers
- Pot 4 consisted of the group runners-up of the 2026 Women's European Water Polo Championship Qualifiers

Pot 1
Team	Rank
Netherlands	1
Spain	2
Greece	3
Italy	4

Pot 2
Team	Rank
Hungary	5
France	6
Great Britain	7
Croatia	8

Pot 3
Team	Group
Portugal (H)	A
Germany	B
Serbia	C
Israel	D

Pot 4
Team	Group
Romania	A
Turkey	B
Switzerland	C
Slovakia	D

- 2026 Women's European Water Polo Championship – Draw
- Draw Live Streaming

=== Draw results ===
Group A
Pos	Team
A1	Greece
A2	France
A3	Slovakia
A4	Germany

Group B
Pos	Team
B1	Hungary
B2	Romania
B3	Spain
B4	Portugal (H)

Group C
Pos	Team
C1	Italy
C2	Serbia
C3	Croatia
C4	Turkey

Group D
Pos	Team
D1	Netherlands
D2	Switzerland
D3	Great Britain
D4	Israel

=== Schedule ===
Schedule
Round	Matchday	Date
Group stage	Matchday 1	26 January 2026
Group stage	Matchday 2	27 January 2026
Group stage	Matchday 3	29 January 2026
Second group stage	Matchday 4	30–31 January 2026
Second group stage	Matchday 5	1 February 2026
9–16 placement games	All games	2 February 2026
Knockout stage 5–8 placement bracket	Semi-finals	3 February 2026
Knockout stage 5–8 placement bracket	5–8 placement games	4 February 2026
Knockout stage 5–8 placement bracket	Final	5 February 2026

== Referees ==
On 24 November 2025, the following 18 referees were selected for the tournament. The referees represent 18 countries, including the 16 participating teams alongside match officials from Malta and Ukraine.

- (Croatia) Lea Saftić
- (France) Aurely Bouchez
- (Germany) Hendrik Schopp
- (United Kingdom) Maxim Gerasimov
- (Greece) Natali Markopoulou
- (Hungary) Nóra Debreceni
- (Israel) Ayal Gabel
- (Italy) Alessia Ferrari
- (Malta) Massimo Angilleri
- (Netherlands) Diana Dutilh Dumas
- (Portugal) Luis Santos
- (Romania) Mihnea Alexandrescu
- (Serbia) Ivanka Raković Krstonošić
- (Slovakia) Martina Kuniková
- (Spain) Marta Cabanas
- (Switzerland) Ruben Garcia
- (Turkey) Gökhan Can Ciğer
- (Ukraine) Anna Goncharenko

== Squads ==
Each nation has to submit a list of 15 players.

== Preliminary round ==
Map of final standings for the 2026 Women's European Water Polo Championship: Winner Runner-up / Third place Fourth place / Main round Classification round

The match schedule was released on 12 November 2025.

=== Tiebreakers ===
Teams are ranked according to points (3 points for a win, 2 points for a penalty shootout win, 1 point for a penalty shootout loss, 0 points for a loss), and if tied on points, the following tiebreaking criteria are applied, in the order given, to determine the rankings:

1. Points in head-to-head matches among tied teams;
2. Goal difference in head-to-head matches among tied teams;
3. Goals scored in head-to-head matches among tied teams;
4. Goal difference in all group matches;
5. Goals scored in all group matches.

If the ranking of one of these teams is determined, the above criteria are consecutively followed until the ranking of all teams is determined. If no ranking can be determined, a drawing of lots will decide the outcome.

All times are local (UTC±0).

=== Group A ===
Pos	Team	Pld	W	PSW	PSL	L	GF	GA	GD	Pts	Qualification
1	Greece	3	3	0	0	0	73	17	+56	9	Main round
2	France	3	2	0	0	1	39	47	−8	6	Main round
3	Germany	3	1	0	0	2	38	50	−12	3	Classification round
4	Slovakia	3	0	0	0	3	31	67	−36	0	Classification round

Source: European Aquatics
Rules for classification: 1) points; 2) head-to-head points; 3) head-to-head goal difference; 4) head-to-head number of goals scored; 5) Goal difference.

26 January 2026; 10:30	Report	Greece	24–7	Slovakia	Olympic Pools Complex, Funchal; Referees: Nóra Debreceni (HUN), Anna Goncharenko (UKR)
26 January 2026; 10:30	Report	Score by quarters: 8–1, 5–3, 7–1, 4–2			Olympic Pools Complex, Funchal; Referees: Nóra Debreceni (HUN), Anna Goncharenko (UKR)
26 January 2026; 10:30	Report	Karagianni 5	Goals	Vitaliano 2	Olympic Pools Complex, Funchal; Referees: Nóra Debreceni (HUN), Anna Goncharenko (UKR)

26 January 2026; 12:15	Report	France	13–11	Germany	Olympic Pools Complex, Funchal; Referees: Luis Santos (POR), Mihnea Alexandrescu (ROU)
26 January 2026; 12:15	Report	Score by quarters: 4–3, 4–1, 3–3, 2–4			Olympic Pools Complex, Funchal; Referees: Luis Santos (POR), Mihnea Alexandrescu (ROU)
26 January 2026; 12:15	Report	Vernoux 5	Goals	Deike 3	Olympic Pools Complex, Funchal; Referees: Luis Santos (POR), Mihnea Alexandrescu (ROU)

27 January 2026; 10:30	Report	Germany	22–11	Slovakia	Olympic Pools Complex, Funchal; Referees: Diana Dutilh Dumas (NED), Ayal Gabel (ISR)
27 January 2026; 10:30	Report	Score by quarters: 7–5, 6–1, 4–1, 5–4			Olympic Pools Complex, Funchal; Referees: Diana Dutilh Dumas (NED), Ayal Gabel (ISR)
27 January 2026; 10:30	Report	Bujka 5	Goals	Stankovianska 5	Olympic Pools Complex, Funchal; Referees: Diana Dutilh Dumas (NED), Ayal Gabel (ISR)

27 January 2026; 17:00	Report	Greece	23–5	France	Olympic Pools Complex, Funchal; Referees: Marta Cabanas (ESP), Maxim Gerasimov (GBR)
27 January 2026; 17:00	Report	Score by quarters: 7–2, 7–2, 6–0, 3–1			Olympic Pools Complex, Funchal; Referees: Marta Cabanas (ESP), Maxim Gerasimov (GBR)
27 January 2026; 17:00	Report	E. Plevritou, V. Plevritou 4	Goals	Benlekbir, Bouloukbachi 2	Olympic Pools Complex, Funchal; Referees: Marta Cabanas (ESP), Maxim Gerasimov (GBR)

29 January 2026; 13:45	Report	Greece	26–5	Germany	Olympic Pools Complex, Funchal; Referees: Ruben Garcia (SUI), Ayal Gabel (ISR)
29 January 2026; 13:45	Report	Score by quarters: 7–1, 6–1, 6–1, 7–2			Olympic Pools Complex, Funchal; Referees: Ruben Garcia (SUI), Ayal Gabel (ISR)
29 January 2026; 13:45	Report	Myriokefalitaki 7	Goals	Bujka 4	Olympic Pools Complex, Funchal; Referees: Ruben Garcia (SUI), Ayal Gabel (ISR)

29 January 2026; 18:45	Report	France	21–13	Slovakia	Olympic Pools Complex, Funchal; Referees: Maxim Gerasimov (GBR), Mihnea Alexandrescu (ROU)
29 January 2026; 18:45	Report	Score by quarters: 5–4, 5–2, 5–4, 6–3			Olympic Pools Complex, Funchal; Referees: Maxim Gerasimov (GBR), Mihnea Alexandrescu (ROU)
29 January 2026; 18:45	Report	Vernoux 7	Goals	Sedláková 3	Olympic Pools Complex, Funchal; Referees: Maxim Gerasimov (GBR), Mihnea Alexandrescu (ROU)

=== Group B ===
Pos	Team	Pld	W	PSW	PSL	L	GF	GA	GD	Pts	Qualification
1	Hungary	3	3	0	0	0	65	14	+51	9	Main round
2	Spain	3	2	0	0	1	51	20	+31	6	Main round
3	Portugal (H)	3	1	0	0	2	23	57	−34	3	Classification round
4	Romania	3	0	0	0	3	14	62	−48	0	Classification round

Source: European Aquatics
Rules for classification: 1) points; 2) head-to-head points; 3) head-to-head goal difference; 4) head-to-head number of goals scored; 5) Goal difference.
(H) Host

26 January 2026; 17:00	Report	Hungary	9–7	Spain	Olympic Pools Complex, Funchal; Referees: Alessia Ferrari (ITA), Aurely Bouchez (FRA)
26 January 2026; 17:00	Report	Score by quarters: 2–2, 2–3, 1–2, 4–0			Olympic Pools Complex, Funchal; Referees: Alessia Ferrari (ITA), Aurely Bouchez (FRA)
26 January 2026; 17:00	Report	Garda, Szilágyi 2	Goals	Ortiz 3	Olympic Pools Complex, Funchal; Referees: Alessia Ferrari (ITA), Aurely Bouchez (FRA)

26 January 2026; 21:00	Report	Romania	7–12	Portugal	Olympic Pools Complex, Funchal; Referees: Natali Markopoulou (GRE), Lea Saftić (CRO)
26 January 2026; 21:00	Report	Score by quarters: 1–2, 1–2, 1–2, 4–6			Olympic Pools Complex, Funchal; Referees: Natali Markopoulou (GRE), Lea Saftić (CRO)
26 January 2026; 21:00	Report	Mihăilă, Şerbănescu 2	Goals	Machado 4	Olympic Pools Complex, Funchal; Referees: Natali Markopoulou (GRE), Lea Saftić (CRO)

27 January 2026; 13:45	Report	Hungary	28–3	Romania	Olympic Pools Complex, Funchal; Referees: Martina Kuniková (SVK), Hendrik Schopp (GER)
27 January 2026; 13:45	Report	Score by quarters: 7–0, 7–1, 6–0, 8–2			Olympic Pools Complex, Funchal; Referees: Martina Kuniková (SVK), Hendrik Schopp (GER)
27 January 2026; 13:45	Report	Faragó 6	Goals	Şerbănescu 2	Olympic Pools Complex, Funchal; Referees: Martina Kuniková (SVK), Hendrik Schopp (GER)

27 January 2026; 20:15	Report	Portugal	7–22	Spain	Olympic Pools Complex, Funchal; Referees: Ivanka Raković Krstonošić (SRB), Anna Goncharenko (UKR)
27 January 2026; 20:15	Report	Score by quarters: 1–5, 2–5, 2–7, 2–5			Olympic Pools Complex, Funchal; Referees: Ivanka Raković Krstonošić (SRB), Anna Goncharenko (UKR)
27 January 2026; 20:15	Report	Machado 3	Goals	Anton 5	Olympic Pools Complex, Funchal; Referees: Ivanka Raković Krstonošić (SRB), Anna Goncharenko (UKR)

29 January 2026; 12:15	Report	Romania	4–22	Spain	Olympic Pools Complex, Funchal; Referees: Anna Goncharenko (UKR), Gökhan Can Ciğer (TUR)
29 January 2026; 12:15	Report	Score by quarters: 1–7, 1–4, 1–5, 1–6			Olympic Pools Complex, Funchal; Referees: Anna Goncharenko (UKR), Gökhan Can Ciğer (TUR)
29 January 2026; 12:15	Report	four players 1	Goals	Anton 5	Olympic Pools Complex, Funchal; Referees: Anna Goncharenko (UKR), Gökhan Can Ciğer (TUR)

29 January 2026; 15:30	Report	Hungary	28–4	Portugal	Olympic Pools Complex, Funchal; Referees: Natali Markopoulou (GRE), Martina Kuniková (SVK)
29 January 2026; 15:30	Report	Score by quarters: 7–2, 7–1, 7–1, 7–0			Olympic Pools Complex, Funchal; Referees: Natali Markopoulou (GRE), Martina Kuniková (SVK)
29 January 2026; 15:30	Report	Vályi 6	Goals	four players 1	Olympic Pools Complex, Funchal; Referees: Natali Markopoulou (GRE), Martina Kuniková (SVK)

=== Group C ===
Pos	Team	Pld	W	PSW	PSL	L	GF	GA	GD	Pts	Qualification
1	Italy	3	3	0	0	0	66	29	+37	9	Main round
2	Croatia	3	2	0	0	1	38	41	−3	6	Main round
3	Serbia	3	1	0	0	2	23	35	−12	3	Classification round
4	Turkey	3	0	0	0	3	28	50	−22	0	Classification round

Source: European Aquatics
Rules for classification: 1) points; 2) head-to-head points; 3) head-to-head goal difference; 4) head-to-head number of goals scored; 5) Goal difference.

26 January 2026; 13:45	Report	Italy	24–12	Croatia	Olympic Pools Complex, Funchal; Referees: Diana Dutilh Dumas (NED), Ruben Garcia (SUI)
26 January 2026; 13:45	Report	Score by quarters: 7–4, 6–3, 6–3, 5–2			Olympic Pools Complex, Funchal; Referees: Diana Dutilh Dumas (NED), Ruben Garcia (SUI)
26 January 2026; 13:45	Report	Cocchiere 5	Goals	Rožić 4	Olympic Pools Complex, Funchal; Referees: Diana Dutilh Dumas (NED), Ruben Garcia (SUI)

26 January 2026; 15:30	Report	Serbia	9–8	Turkey	Olympic Pools Complex, Funchal; Referees: Marta Cabanas (ESP), Maxim Gerasimov (GBR)
26 January 2026; 15:30	Report	Score by quarters: 2–2, 3–2, 3–3, 1–1			Olympic Pools Complex, Funchal; Referees: Marta Cabanas (ESP), Maxim Gerasimov (GBR)
26 January 2026; 15:30	Report	Radonjić 6	Goals	Dabbağ 3	Olympic Pools Complex, Funchal; Referees: Marta Cabanas (ESP), Maxim Gerasimov (GBR)

27 January 2026; 12:15	Report	Italy	17–6	Serbia	Olympic Pools Complex, Funchal; Referees: Mihnea Alexandrescu (ROU), Massimo Angilleri (MLT)
27 January 2026; 12:15	Report	Score by quarters: 5–2, 5–1, 4–2, 3–1			Olympic Pools Complex, Funchal; Referees: Mihnea Alexandrescu (ROU), Massimo Angilleri (MLT)
27 January 2026; 12:15	Report	three players 3	Goals	Milićević 3	Olympic Pools Complex, Funchal; Referees: Mihnea Alexandrescu (ROU), Massimo Angilleri (MLT)

27 January 2026; 18:45	Report	Turkey	9–16	Croatia	Olympic Pools Complex, Funchal; Referees: Nóra Debreceni (HUN), Luis Santos (POR)
27 January 2026; 18:45	Report	Score by quarters: 4–2, 2–5, 2–4, 1–5			Olympic Pools Complex, Funchal; Referees: Nóra Debreceni (HUN), Luis Santos (POR)
27 January 2026; 18:45	Report	Molnar, Yermakova 3	Goals	Janković, Rožić 5	Olympic Pools Complex, Funchal; Referees: Nóra Debreceni (HUN), Luis Santos (POR)

29 January 2026; 09:00	Report	Italy	25–11	Turkey	Olympic Pools Complex, Funchal; Referees: Diana Dutilh Dumas (NED), Luis Santos (POR)
29 January 2026; 09:00	Report	Score by quarters: 7–2, 4–4, 7–3, 7–2			Olympic Pools Complex, Funchal; Referees: Diana Dutilh Dumas (NED), Luis Santos (POR)
29 January 2026; 09:00	Report	Ranalli 5	Goals	Yermakova 4	Olympic Pools Complex, Funchal; Referees: Diana Dutilh Dumas (NED), Luis Santos (POR)

29 January 2026; 17:00	Report	Serbia	8–10	Croatia	Olympic Pools Complex, Funchal; Referees: Marta Cabanas (ESP), Nóra Debreceni (HUN)
29 January 2026; 17:00	Report	Score by quarters: 2–2, 4–3, 0–3, 2–2			Olympic Pools Complex, Funchal; Referees: Marta Cabanas (ESP), Nóra Debreceni (HUN)
29 January 2026; 17:00	Report	Milićević, Vuković 2	Goals	Butić 4	Olympic Pools Complex, Funchal; Referees: Marta Cabanas (ESP), Nóra Debreceni (HUN)

=== Group D ===
Pos	Team	Pld	W	PSW	PSL	L	GF	GA	GD	Pts	Qualification
1	Netherlands	3	3	0	0	0	65	12	+53	9	Main round
2	Israel	3	2	0	0	1	41	38	+3	6	Main round
3	Great Britain	3	1	0	0	2	28	31	−3	3	Classification round
4	Switzerland	3	0	0	0	3	17	70	−53	0	Classification round

Source: European Aquatics
Rules for classification: 1) points; 2) head-to-head points; 3) head-to-head goal difference; 4) head-to-head number of goals scored; 5) Goal difference.

26 January 2026; 09:00	Report	Switzerland	9–24	Israel	Olympic Pools Complex, Funchal; Referees: Ivanka Raković Krstonošić (SRB), Massimo Angileri (MLT)
26 January 2026; 09:00	Report	Score by quarters: 0–7, 1–9, 2–2, 6–6			Olympic Pools Complex, Funchal; Referees: Ivanka Raković Krstonošić (SRB), Massimo Angileri (MLT)
26 January 2026; 09:00	Report	Verhagen 3	Goals	Bogachenko, Yaacobi 4	Olympic Pools Complex, Funchal; Referees: Ivanka Raković Krstonošić (SRB), Massimo Angileri (MLT)

26 January 2026; 18:45	Report	Netherlands	14–4	Great Britain	Olympic Pools Complex, Funchal; Referees: Hendrik Schopp (GER), Martina Kuniková (SVK)
26 January 2026; 18:45	Report	Score by quarters: 3–0, 6–0, 3–3, 2–1			Olympic Pools Complex, Funchal; Referees: Hendrik Schopp (GER), Martina Kuniková (SVK)
26 January 2026; 18:45	Report	B. Rogge 3	Goals	Turner 2	Olympic Pools Complex, Funchal; Referees: Hendrik Schopp (GER), Martina Kuniková (SVK)

27 January 2026; 09:00	Report	Netherlands	28–2	Switzerland	Olympic Pools Complex, Funchal; Referees: Natali Markopoulou (GRE), Gökhan Can Ciğer (TUR)
27 January 2026; 09:00	Report	Score by quarters: 10–1, 7–0, 7–0, 4–1			Olympic Pools Complex, Funchal; Referees: Natali Markopoulou (GRE), Gökhan Can Ciğer (TUR)
27 January 2026; 09:00	Report	Joustra 9	Goals	De Feo 2	Olympic Pools Complex, Funchal; Referees: Natali Markopoulou (GRE), Gökhan Can Ciğer (TUR)

27 January 2026; 15:30	Report	Israel	11–6	Great Britain	Olympic Pools Complex, Funchal; Referees: Alessia Ferrari (ITA), Lea Saftić (CRO)
27 January 2026; 15:30	Report	Score by quarters: 2–1, 2–1, 4–2, 3–2			Olympic Pools Complex, Funchal; Referees: Alessia Ferrari (ITA), Lea Saftić (CRO)
27 January 2026; 15:30	Report	Yaacobi, Levinshtein 3	Goals	Turner 2	Olympic Pools Complex, Funchal; Referees: Alessia Ferrari (ITA), Lea Saftić (CRO)

29 January 2026; 10:30	Report	Netherlands	23–6	Israel	Olympic Pools Complex, Funchal; Referees: Aurely Bouchez (FRA), Ivanka Rakovic Krstonosic (SRB)
29 January 2026; 10:30	Report	Score by quarters: 7–2, 6–2, 7–2, 3–0			Olympic Pools Complex, Funchal; Referees: Aurely Bouchez (FRA), Ivanka Rakovic Krstonosic (SRB)
29 January 2026; 10:30	Report	L. Rogge, Schaap 4	Goals	Bogachenko 3	Olympic Pools Complex, Funchal; Referees: Aurely Bouchez (FRA), Ivanka Rakovic Krstonosic (SRB)

29 January 2026; 20:15	Report	Switzerland	6–18	Great Britain	Olympic Pools Complex, Funchal; Referees: Alessia Ferrari (ITA), Massimo Angilleri (MLT)
29 January 2026; 20:15	Report	Score by quarters: 2–4, 1–4, 1–6, 2–4			Olympic Pools Complex, Funchal; Referees: Alessia Ferrari (ITA), Massimo Angilleri (MLT)
29 January 2026; 20:15	Report	De Feo, Kohli 2	Goals	Blenkinship 6	Olympic Pools Complex, Funchal; Referees: Alessia Ferrari (ITA), Massimo Angilleri (MLT)

== Classification round ==
=== Group G ===
Pos	Team	Pld	W	PSW	PSL	L	GF	GA	GD	Pts	Qualification
1	Serbia	3	2	0	1	0	30	21	+9	7	Ninth place game
2	Germany	3	1	1	1	0	43	32	+11	6	Eleventh place game
3	Turkey	3	1	1	0	1	33	30	+3	5	13th place game
4	Slovakia	3	0	0	0	3	24	47	−23	0	15th place game

Source: European Aquatics
Rules for classification: 1) points; 2) head-to-head points; 3) head-to-head goal difference; 4) head-to-head number of goals scored; 5) Goal difference.

30 January 2026; 13:00	Report	Germany	12–12; PSO: 2–3	Turkey	Olympic Pools Complex, Funchal; Referees: Alessia Ferrari (ITA), Natali Markopoulou (GRE)
30 January 2026; 13:00	Report	Score by quarters: 3–4, 3–1, 1–4, 5–3			Olympic Pools Complex, Funchal; Referees: Alessia Ferrari (ITA), Natali Markopoulou (GRE)
30 January 2026; 13:00	Report	Vosseberg 3	Goals	Ivanova 4	Olympic Pools Complex, Funchal; Referees: Alessia Ferrari (ITA), Natali Markopoulou (GRE)

30 January 2026; 15:00	Report	Serbia	12–4	Slovakia	Olympic Pools Complex, Funchal; Referees: Aurely Bouchez (FRA), Ayal Gabel (ISR)
30 January 2026; 15:00	Report	Score by quarters: 2–2, 5–0, 2–2, 3–0			Olympic Pools Complex, Funchal; Referees: Aurely Bouchez (FRA), Ayal Gabel (ISR)
30 January 2026; 15:00	Report	Radonjić 3	Goals	four players 1	Olympic Pools Complex, Funchal; Referees: Aurely Bouchez (FRA), Ayal Gabel (ISR)

1 February 2026; 09:00	Report	Slovakia	9–13	Turkey	Olympic Pools Complex, Funchal; Referees: Nóra Debreceni (HUN), Alessia Ferrari (ITA)
1 February 2026; 09:00	Report	Score by quarters: 4–5, 3–2, 2–4, 0–2			Olympic Pools Complex, Funchal; Referees: Nóra Debreceni (HUN), Alessia Ferrari (ITA)
1 February 2026; 09:00	Report	Kačková 3	Goals	Molnar 5	Olympic Pools Complex, Funchal; Referees: Nóra Debreceni (HUN), Alessia Ferrari (ITA)

1 February 2026; 12:15	Report	Germany	9–9; PSO: 4–3	Serbia	Olympic Pools Complex, Funchal; Referees: Natali Markopoulou (GRE), Lea Saftić (CRO)
1 February 2026; 12:15	Report	Score by quarters: 3–4, 4–4, 1–0, 1–1			Olympic Pools Complex, Funchal; Referees: Natali Markopoulou (GRE), Lea Saftić (CRO)
1 February 2026; 12:15	Report	Plotz 4	Goals	Radonjić, Vuković 2	Olympic Pools Complex, Funchal; Referees: Natali Markopoulou (GRE), Lea Saftić (CRO)

=== Group H ===
Pos	Team	Pld	W	PSW	PSL	L	GF	GA	GD	Pts	Qualification
1	Great Britain	3	3	0	0	0	53	16	+37	9	Ninth place game
2	Portugal (H)	3	2	0	0	1	37	32	+5	6	Eleventh place game
3	Switzerland	3	1	0	0	2	30	47	−17	3	13th place game
4	Romania	3	0	0	0	3	21	46	−25	0	15th place game

Source: European Aquatics
Rules for classification: 1) points; 2) head-to-head points; 3) head-to-head goal difference; 4) head-to-head number of goals scored; 5) Goal difference.
(H) Host

30 January 2026; 17:15	Report	Portugal	17–10	Switzerland	Olympic Pools Complex, Funchal; Referees: Diana Dutilh Dumas (NED), Anna Goncharenko (UKR)
30 January 2026; 17:15	Report	Score by quarters: 5–2, 3–3, 6–1, 3–4			Olympic Pools Complex, Funchal; Referees: Diana Dutilh Dumas (NED), Anna Goncharenko (UKR)
30 January 2026; 17:15	Report	four players 3	Goals	De Feo, Verhagen 3	Olympic Pools Complex, Funchal; Referees: Diana Dutilh Dumas (NED), Anna Goncharenko (UKR)

30 January 2026; 19:15	Report	Great Britain	20–2	Romania	Olympic Pools Complex, Funchal; Referees: Nóra Debreceni (HUN), Lea Saftić (CRO)
30 January 2026; 19:15	Report	Score by quarters: 3–0, 6–0, 5–1, 6–1			Olympic Pools Complex, Funchal; Referees: Nóra Debreceni (HUN), Lea Saftić (CRO)
30 January 2026; 19:15	Report	Dickens 5	Goals	Melnychuk, Szeghalmi 1	Olympic Pools Complex, Funchal; Referees: Nóra Debreceni (HUN), Lea Saftić (CRO)

1 February 2026; 10:30	Report	Romania	12–14	Switzerland	Olympic Pools Complex, Funchal; Referees: Diana Dutilh Dumas (NED), Ayal Gabel (ISR)
1 February 2026; 10:30	Report	Score by quarters: 3–3, 3–1, 3–5, 3–5			Olympic Pools Complex, Funchal; Referees: Diana Dutilh Dumas (NED), Ayal Gabel (ISR)
1 February 2026; 10:30	Report	Szeghalmi 4	Goals	Verhagen 5	Olympic Pools Complex, Funchal; Referees: Diana Dutilh Dumas (NED), Ayal Gabel (ISR)

1 February 2026; 13:45	Report	Portugal	8–15	Great Britain	Olympic Pools Complex, Funchal; Referees: Marta Cabanas (ESP), Aurely Bouchez (FRA)
1 February 2026; 13:45	Report	Score by quarters: 0–3, 4–3, 1–5, 3–4			Olympic Pools Complex, Funchal; Referees: Marta Cabanas (ESP), Aurely Bouchez (FRA)
1 February 2026; 13:45	Report	Machado, Nunes 2	Goals	three players 3	Olympic Pools Complex, Funchal; Referees: Marta Cabanas (ESP), Aurely Bouchez (FRA)

=== Placement games ===
==== 15th place game ====
2 February 2026; 13:00	Report	Slovakia	16–12	Romania	Olympic Pools Complex, Funchal; Referees: Anna Goncharenko (UKR), Ruben Garcia (SUI)
2 February 2026; 13:00	Report	Score by quarters: 4–2, 5–4, 3–2, 4–4			Olympic Pools Complex, Funchal; Referees: Anna Goncharenko (UKR), Ruben Garcia (SUI)
2 February 2026; 13:00	Report	Sedlakova 9	Goals	Mihaila 5	Olympic Pools Complex, Funchal; Referees: Anna Goncharenko (UKR), Ruben Garcia (SUI)

==== 13th place game ====
2 February 2026; 15:00	Report	Turkey	19–8	Switzerland	Olympic Pools Complex, Funchal; Referees: Luis Santos (POR), Massimo Angilleri (MLT)
2 February 2026; 15:00	Report	Score by quarters: 4–4, 7–1, 2–0, 6–3			Olympic Pools Complex, Funchal; Referees: Luis Santos (POR), Massimo Angilleri (MLT)
2 February 2026; 15:00	Report	Molnar 4	Goals	Kohli 3	Olympic Pools Complex, Funchal; Referees: Luis Santos (POR), Massimo Angilleri (MLT)

==== Eleventh place game ====
2 February 2026; 17:15	Report	Germany	13–12	Portugal	Olympic Pools Complex, Funchal; Referees: Martina Kuniková (SVK), Ayal Gabel (ISR)
2 February 2026; 17:15	Report	Score by quarters: 5–3, 3–2, 1–5, 4–2			Olympic Pools Complex, Funchal; Referees: Martina Kuniková (SVK), Ayal Gabel (ISR)
2 February 2026; 17:15	Report	G. Deike 4	Goals	Machado 5	Olympic Pools Complex, Funchal; Referees: Martina Kuniková (SVK), Ayal Gabel (ISR)

==== Ninth place game ====
2 February 2026; 19:15	Report	Serbia	9–10	Great Britain	Olympic Pools Complex, Funchal; Referees: Gökhan Can Ciğer (TUR), Mihnea Alexandrescu (ROU)
2 February 2026; 19:15	Report	Score by quarters: 1–1, 3–3, 2–3, 3–3			Olympic Pools Complex, Funchal; Referees: Gökhan Can Ciğer (TUR), Mihnea Alexandrescu (ROU)
2 February 2026; 19:15	Report	Ćuk, Vuković 2	Goals	Turner 4	Olympic Pools Complex, Funchal; Referees: Gökhan Can Ciğer (TUR), Mihnea Alexandrescu (ROU)

== Main round ==
All points obtained in the preliminary round against teams that advance as well were carried over.

=== Group E ===
Pos	Team	Pld	W	PSW	PSL	L	GF	GA	GD	Pts	Qualification
1	Greece	3	3	0	0	0	61	21	+40	9	Semifinals
2	Italy	3	2	0	0	1	58	32	+26	6	Semifinals
3	Croatia	3	1	0	0	2	33	56	−23	3	5th–8th place semifinals
4	France	3	0	0	0	3	19	62	−43	0	5th–8th place semifinals

Source: European Aquatics
Rules for classification: 1) points; 2) head-to-head points; 3) head-to-head goal difference; 4) head-to-head number of goals scored; 5) goal difference.

31 January 2026; 13:00	Report	Greece	15–10	Italy	Olympic Pools Complex, Funchal; Referees: Ivanka Raković Krstonošić (SRB), Hendrik Schopp (GER)
31 January 2026; 13:00	Report	Score by quarters: 6–1, 1–2, 5–4, 3–3			Olympic Pools Complex, Funchal; Referees: Ivanka Raković Krstonošić (SRB), Hendrik Schopp (GER)
31 January 2026; 13:00	Report	V. Plevritou 4	Goals	three players 2	Olympic Pools Complex, Funchal; Referees: Ivanka Raković Krstonošić (SRB), Hendrik Schopp (GER)

31 January 2026; 17:15	Report	France	9–15	Croatia	Olympic Pools Complex, Funchal; Referees: Maxim Gerasimov (GBR), Luis Santos (POR)
31 January 2026; 17:15	Report	Score by quarters: 2–4, 2–3, 3–3, 2–5			Olympic Pools Complex, Funchal; Referees: Maxim Gerasimov (GBR), Luis Santos (POR)
31 January 2026; 17:15	Report	Di-Fraja, Heurtaux 2	Goals	Rožić 4	Olympic Pools Complex, Funchal; Referees: Maxim Gerasimov (GBR), Luis Santos (POR)

1 February 2026; 15:30	Report	Italy	24–5	France	Olympic Pools Complex, Funchal; Referees: Anna Goncharenko (UKR), Massimo Angilleri (MLT)
1 February 2026; 15:30	Report	Score by quarters: 8–1, 3–1, 5–0, 8–3			Olympic Pools Complex, Funchal; Referees: Anna Goncharenko (UKR), Massimo Angilleri (MLT)
1 February 2026; 15:30	Report	Ranalli 5	Goals	Bouloukbachi, Vernoux 2	Olympic Pools Complex, Funchal; Referees: Anna Goncharenko (UKR), Massimo Angilleri (MLT)

1 February 2026; 18:45	Report	Greece	23–6	Croatia	Olympic Pools Complex, Funchal; Referees: Luis Santos (POR), Mihnea Alexandrescu (ROU)
1 February 2026; 18:45	Report	Score by quarters: 5–0, 6–2, 6–0, 6–4			Olympic Pools Complex, Funchal; Referees: Luis Santos (POR), Mihnea Alexandrescu (ROU)
1 February 2026; 18:45	Report	V. Plevritou 6	Goals	Rožić 3	Olympic Pools Complex, Funchal; Referees: Luis Santos (POR), Mihnea Alexandrescu (ROU)

=== Group F ===
Pos	Team	Pld	W	PSW	PSL	L	GF	GA	GD	Pts	Qualification
1	Netherlands	3	2	0	1	0	41	23	+18	7	Semifinals
2	Hungary	3	2	0	0	1	35	18	+17	6	Semifinals
3	Spain	3	1	1	0	1	43	29	+14	5	5th–8th place semifinals
4	Israel	3	0	0	0	3	19	68	−49	0	5th–8th place semifinals

Source: European Aquatics
Rules for classification: 1) points; 2) head-to-head points; 3) head-to-head goal difference; 4) head-to-head number of goals scored; 5) goal difference.

31 January 2026; 15:00	Report	Netherlands	5–4	Hungary	Olympic Pools Complex, Funchal; Referees: Maxim Gerasimov (GBR), Luis Santos (POR)
31 January 2026; 15:00	Report	Score by quarters: 2–0, 2–2, 0–0, 1–2			Olympic Pools Complex, Funchal; Referees: Maxim Gerasimov (GBR), Luis Santos (POR)
31 January 2026; 15:00	Report	L. Rogge 2	Goals	four players 1	Olympic Pools Complex, Funchal; Referees: Maxim Gerasimov (GBR), Luis Santos (POR)

31 January 2026; 19:15	Report	Spain	23–7	Israel	Olympic Pools Complex, Funchal; Referees: Ruben Garcia (SUI), Mihnea Alexandrescu (ROU)
31 January 2026; 19:15	Report	Score by quarters: 6–2, 6–2, 6–2, 5–1			Olympic Pools Complex, Funchal; Referees: Ruben Garcia (SUI), Mihnea Alexandrescu (ROU)
31 January 2026; 19:15	Report	Ortiz 4	Goals	Yaacobi 3	Olympic Pools Complex, Funchal; Referees: Ruben Garcia (SUI), Mihnea Alexandrescu (ROU)

1 February 2026; 17:00	Report	Hungary	22–6	Israel	Olympic Pools Complex, Funchal; Referees: Ivanka Raković Krstonošić (SRB), Ruben Garcia (SUI)
1 February 2026; 17:00	Report	Score by quarters: 5–4, 5–1, 7–1, 5–0			Olympic Pools Complex, Funchal; Referees: Ivanka Raković Krstonošić (SRB), Ruben Garcia (SUI)
1 February 2026; 17:00	Report	Keszthelyi 4	Goals	Tirosh 2	Olympic Pools Complex, Funchal; Referees: Ivanka Raković Krstonošić (SRB), Ruben Garcia (SUI)

1 February 2026; 20:15	Report	Netherlands	13–13; PSO: 0–3	Spain	Olympic Pools Complex, Funchal; Referees: Hendrik Schopp (GER), Gökhan Can Ciğer (TUR)
1 February 2026; 20:15	Report	Score by quarters: 1–2, 3–3, 5–3, 4–5			Olympic Pools Complex, Funchal; Referees: Hendrik Schopp (GER), Gökhan Can Ciğer (TUR)
1 February 2026; 20:15	Report	Joustra 5	Goals	Ortiz 7	Olympic Pools Complex, Funchal; Referees: Hendrik Schopp (GER), Gökhan Can Ciğer (TUR)

== Knockout stage ==
=== Bracket ===
Semifinals
3 February
Greece	8 (3)
Hungary (PSO)	8 (4)
3 February
Netherlands	8
Italy	4

Final
5 February
Hungary	10 (3)
Netherlands (PSO)	10 (5)
Third place game
5 February
Greece	15
Italy	8

5th–8th place semifinals
3 February
Croatia	15
Israel	11
3 February
Spain	15
France	4

Fifth place game
4 February
Croatia	9
Spain	23
Seventh place game
4 February
Israel	20
France	12

=== 5th–8th place semifinals ===
3 February 2026; 13:00	Report	Croatia	16–11	Israel	Olympic Pools Complex, Funchal; Referees: Alessia Ferrari (ITA), Diana Dutilh Dumas (NED)
3 February 2026; 13:00	Report	Score by quarters: 5–4, 3–2, 4–3, 4–2			Olympic Pools Complex, Funchal; Referees: Alessia Ferrari (ITA), Diana Dutilh Dumas (NED)
3 February 2026; 13:00	Report	Janković, Rozić 4	Goals	Levinshtein 3	Olympic Pools Complex, Funchal; Referees: Alessia Ferrari (ITA), Diana Dutilh Dumas (NED)

3 February 2026; 15:00	Report	Spain	15–4	France	Olympic Pools Complex, Funchal; Referees: Martina Kuniková (SVK), Ruben Garcia (ESP)
3 February 2026; 15:00	Report	Score by quarters: 6–1, 4–1, 3–1, 2–1			Olympic Pools Complex, Funchal; Referees: Martina Kuniková (SVK), Ruben Garcia (ESP)
3 February 2026; 15:00	Report	Ortiz 4	Goals	four players 1	Olympic Pools Complex, Funchal; Referees: Martina Kuniková (SVK), Ruben Garcia (ESP)

=== Semifinals ===
3 February 2026; 17:15	Report	Greece	8–8; PSO: 3–4	Hungary	Olympic Pools Complex, Funchal; Referees: Marta Cabanas (ESP), Ivanka Raković Krstonošić (SRB)
3 February 2026; 17:15	Report	Score by quarters: 1–3, 2–1, 2–2, 3–2			Olympic Pools Complex, Funchal; Referees: Marta Cabanas (ESP), Ivanka Raković Krstonošić (SRB)
3 February 2026; 17:15	Report	three players 2	Goals	Garda, Keszthelyi 2	Olympic Pools Complex, Funchal; Referees: Marta Cabanas (ESP), Ivanka Raković Krstonošić (SRB)

3 February 2026; 19:15	Report	Netherlands	8–4	Italy	Olympic Pools Complex, Funchal; Referees: Aurely Bouchez (FRA), Maxim Gerasimov (GBR)
3 February 2026; 19:15	Report	Score by quarters: 4–1, 1–1, 1–1, 2–1			Olympic Pools Complex, Funchal; Referees: Aurely Bouchez (FRA), Maxim Gerasimov (GBR)
3 February 2026; 19:15	Report	Hicks, Joustra 2	Goals	Bettini 2	Olympic Pools Complex, Funchal; Referees: Aurely Bouchez (FRA), Maxim Gerasimov (GBR)

=== Seventh place game ===
4 February 2026; 17:15	Report	Israel	20–12	France	Olympic Pools Complex, Funchal; Referees: Nóra Debreceni (HUN), Diana Dutilh Dumas (NED)
4 February 2026; 17:15	Report	Score by quarters: 7–3, 3–2, 6–5, 4–2			Olympic Pools Complex, Funchal; Referees: Nóra Debreceni (HUN), Diana Dutilh Dumas (NED)
4 February 2026; 17:15	Report	Bogachenko 7	Goals	Vernoux 6	Olympic Pools Complex, Funchal; Referees: Nóra Debreceni (HUN), Diana Dutilh Dumas (NED)

=== Fifth place game ===
4 February 2026; 19:15	Report	Croatia	9–23	Spain	Olympic Pools Complex, Funchal; Referees: Aurely Bouchez (FRA), Luis Santos (POR)
4 February 2026; 19:15	Report	Score by quarters: 4–8, 1–5, 1–5, 3–5			Olympic Pools Complex, Funchal; Referees: Aurely Bouchez (FRA), Luis Santos (POR)
4 February 2026; 19:15	Report	Butić 3	Goals	Ortiz 5	Olympic Pools Complex, Funchal; Referees: Aurely Bouchez (FRA), Luis Santos (POR)

=== Third place game ===
5 February 2026; 17:15	Report	Greece	15–8	Italy	Olympic Pools Complex, Funchal; Referees: Marta Cabanas (ESP), Maxim Gerasimov (GBR)
5 February 2026; 17:15	Report	Score by quarters: 5–1, 5–3, 5–2, 0–2			Olympic Pools Complex, Funchal; Referees: Marta Cabanas (ESP), Maxim Gerasimov (GBR)
5 February 2026; 17:15	Report	V. Plevritou, Tricha 3	Goals	Bettini 4	Olympic Pools Complex, Funchal; Referees: Marta Cabanas (ESP), Maxim Gerasimov (GBR)

=== Final ===
5 February 2026; 19:15	Report	Hungary	10–10; PSO: 3–5	Netherlands	Olympic Pools Complex, Funchal; Referees: Aurely Bouchez (FRA), Hendrik Schopp (GER)
5 February 2026; 19:15	Report	Score by quarters: 3–1, 1–4, 2–2, 4–3			Olympic Pools Complex, Funchal; Referees: Aurely Bouchez (FRA), Hendrik Schopp (GER)
5 February 2026; 19:15	Report	five players 2	Goals	Van de Kraats 3	Olympic Pools Complex, Funchal; Referees: Aurely Bouchez (FRA), Hendrik Schopp (GER)

== Final standings ==
=== Best results ===
Team	Previous	New
Croatia	8th (2010, 2022, 2024)	6th

=== Rankings table ===
Pos	Team	Pld	W	PSW	PSL	L	GF	GA	GD	Pts	Final result
1	Netherlands	7	5	1	1	0	101	43	+58	18	Champions
2	Hungary	7	4	1	1	1	109	43	+66	15	Runners-up
3	Greece	7	6	0	1	0	134	49	+85	19	Third place
4	Italy	7	4	0	0	3	112	72	+40	12	Fourth place
5	Spain	7	5	1	0	1	125	53	+72	17	Fifth place game
6	Croatia	7	4	0	0	3	83	107	−24	12	Fifth place game
7	Israel	7	3	0	0	4	85	110	−25	9	Seventh place game
8	France	7	2	0	0	5	69	121	−52	6	Seventh place game
9	Great Britain	6	4	0	0	2	73	50	+23	12	Ninth place game
10	Serbia	6	2	0	1	3	53	58	−5	7	Ninth place game
11	Germany	6	2	1	1	2	72	83	−11	9	Eleventh place game
12	Portugal (H)	6	2	0	0	4	60	95	−35	6	Eleventh place game
13	Turkey	6	2	1	0	3	72	79	−7	8	Thirteenth place game
14	Switzerland	6	1	0	0	5	49	118	−69	3	Thirteenth place game
15	Slovakia	6	1	0	0	5	60	104	−44	3	Fifteenth place game
16	Romania	6	0	0	0	6	40	112	−72	0	Fifteenth place game

Source: European Aquatics
Rules for classification: 1) points; 2) head-to-head points; 3) head-to-head goal difference; 4) head-to-head number of goals scored; 5) Goal difference.
(H) Host

=== Qualification table ===
Rank	Team	Qualification	
Rank	Team	WC	EC
1st place, gold medalist(s)	Netherlands	Q	Q
2nd place, silver medalist(s)	Hungary	Q	Q
3rd place, bronze medalist(s)	Greece	Q	Q
4	Italy		Q
5	Spain		Q
6	Croatia		Q
7	Israel		Q
8	France		Q
9	Great Britain		
10	Serbia		
11	Germany		
12	Portugal		
13	Turkey		
14	Switzerland		
15	Slovakia		
16	Romania		

Q	Qualified directly to a main tournament

Method of qualification

Qualified for the phase indicated based on this tournament

2026 Women's European Water Polo Championship

Netherlands
Seventh title

Team roster: Laura Aarts, Christina Hicks, Simone van de Kraats, Maxine Schaap, Maartje Keuning, Fleurien Bosveld, Bente Rogge, Noa de Vries, Kitty-Lynn Joustra, Lieke Rogge, Lola Moolhuijzen, Nina ten Broek, Britt van den Dobbelsteen, Pien Gorter, Linde Haksteen.
Head Coach: Evangelos Doudesis

=== All Star Team ===
The all-star team was announced on 5 February 2026.

Position	Player
Goalkeeper	(Netherlands) Laura Aarts
Field player	(Greece) Maria Myriokefalitaki
Field player	(Hungary) Rita Keszthelyi
Field player	(Netherlands) Simone van de Kraats
Field player	(Hungary) Krisztina Garda
Field player	(Netherlands) Kitty-Lynn Joustra
Field player	(Greece) Eleni Xenaki

== Statistics ==
=== Top goalscorers ===
Rank	Name	Goals	Shots	%
1	(Spain) Beatriz Ortiz	25	39	64
2	(Greece) Vasiliki Plevritou	24	45	53
2	(Croatia) Iva Rožić	24	45	53
4	(Netherlands) Kitty-Lynn Joustra	22	28	79
4	(France) Ema Vernoux	22	57	39
6	(Israel) Alma Yaacobi	20	41	49
6	(Israel) Maria Bogachenko	20	42	48
8	(Italy) Dafne Bettini	19	38	50
8	(Slovakia) Monika Sedláková	19	38	50
10	(Greece) Maria Myriokefalitaki	18	28	64
10	(Italy) Chiara Ranalli	18	30	60
10	(Portugal) Maria Machado	18	47	38
10	(Croatia) Jelena Butić	18	58	31

=== Top scoring teams ===
Rank	Name	Goals	Shots	%
1	Greece	134	258	51.9
2	Spain	125	246	50.8
3	Italy	112	233	48.1
4	Hungary	109	250	43.6
5	Netherlands	101	226	44.7
6	Israel	85	202	42.1
7	Croatia	84	217	38.7
8	Great Britain	73	196	37.2
9	Germany	72	185	38.9
10	Turkey	72	198	36.4
11	France	69	231	29.9
12	Portugal	60	182	33
13	Slovakia	60	195	30.8
14	Serbia	53	186	28.5
15	Switzerland	49	191	25.7
16	Romania	40	171	23.4

=== Top assisting teams ===
Rank	Team	Assists
1	Spain	63
2	Netherlands	52
3	Hungary	50
4	Greece	45
5	Italy	44
6	Croatia	35
7	Turkey	34
8	Great Britain	25
9	Israel	23
9	Portugal	23
11	Serbia	18
12	France	15
13	Germany	13
14	Romania	10
15	Switzerland	8
16	Slovakia	7

=== Top sprinting teams ===
Rank	Name	Sprints	%
1	Hungary	24/28	85.7
2	Spain	22/28	78.5
3	Italy	21/28	75
4	Great Britain	17/24	70.8
5	Switzerland	14/24	58.3
5	France	14/28	50
5	Greece	14/28	50
8	Netherlands	13/28	46.4
9	Croatia	12/28	42.8
10	Germany	11/24	45.8
10	Turkey	11/24	45.8
12	Serbia	10/24	41.6
12	Slovakia	10/24	41.6
14	Portugal	9/24	37.5
15	Romania	5/24	20.8
16	Israel	1/28	3.5

=== Player of the match ===
For the first time, player of the match awards will be given during the knockout stage. A player of the match award is given to the player deemed as playing the best in each match.

Round	Team	Match	Team	Player	Ref
Semifinals	Greece	11–12 PS	Hungary	(Hungary) Rita Keszthelyi	
Semifinals	Netherlands	8–4	Italy	(Netherlands) Kitty-Lynn Joustra	
Third place game	Greece	15–8	Italy	(Greece) Eleni Xenaki	
Final	Hungary	13–15 PS	Netherlands	(Netherlands) Simone van de Kraats	

==== Notable statistics ====
- Most goals in a game: 36 (Italy 25–11 Turkey, 29 January)
- Least goals in a game: 9 (Netherlands 5–4 Hungary, 31 January)
- Most goals by a team in a game: 28 (Netherlands 28–2 Switzerland, 27 January; Hungary 28–3 Romania, 27 January; Hungary 28–4 Portugal, 29 January)
- Least goals by a team in a game: 2 (Netherlands 28–2 Switzerland, 27 January; Great Britain 20–2 Romania, 30 January)
- Biggest goal difference in a game: 26 (Netherlands 28–2 Switzerland, 27 January)
- Biggest half time deficit in a game: 16 (Netherlands 17–1 Switzerland, 27 January)
- Most goals scored by a player in a game: 9 ( (Netherlands) Kitty-Lynn Joustra vs Switzerland, 27 January; (Slovakia) Monika Sedlakova vs Romania, 2 February)

==== Notable occurrences ====
- Switzerland won their first game since 1993 after beating Romania 14–12.

== Broadcasting rights ==
The television channels broadcasting the event is as follows:

Territory	Rights holder
Bulgaria	BNT
Croatia	HRT
Cyprus	CyBC
Greece	ERT
Hungary	MTVA
Israel	The Sports Channel
Italy	RAI
Lithuania	LRT
Netherlands	NOS
Poland	TVP
Portugal	RTP
Spain	RTVE
Rest of World	Eurovision Sports

== Notes ==
Reference
Matchday 1 Day 1
Matchday 2 Day 2
Matchday 3 Day 4
Matchday 4 Day 5
Matchday 4 Day 6
Matchday 5 Day 7
Matchday 6 Day 8
Matchday 6 Day 9
Matchday 7 Day 10
Matchday 7 Day 11

Reference
Matchday 1 Day 1
Matchday 2 Day 2
Matchday 3 Day 4
Matchday 4 Day 5
Matchday 4 Day 6
Matchday 5 Day 7
Matchday 6 Day 8
Matchday 6 Day 9
Matchday 7 Day 10
Matchday 7 Day 11
