= 2026 Women's European Water Polo Championship Qualifiers =

Tournament details
- Host country: (Portugal) Setúbal (Germany) Hannover (Serbia) Novi Sad (Slovakia) Nováky
- Dates: 6–8 June
- Teams: 13

Tournament statistics
- Matches played: 15
- Goals scored: 388 (25.87 per match)
- Top scorer: (Serbia) Ana Milićević (15 goals)

The 2026 Women's European Water Polo Championship Qualifiers were organised by European Aquatics and held between 6 and 8 June 2025 in four different centralised locations. The qualifiers determined the eight women's water polo national teams that would join the eight automatically qualified teams at the final tournament.

== Qualified teams ==
Team	Qualification method	Date of qualification	Appearance(s)				Previous best performance (Note: Bold text indicates they hosted that edition.)	Rank
Team	Qualification method	Date of qualification	Total	First	Last	Streak	Previous best performance	Rank
Greece	Top eight in 2024	6 January 2024	19th	1989	2024	19	Runners-up (2010, 2012, 2018, 2022)	2
Italy	Top eight in 2024	6 January 2024	19th	1989	2024	19	Champions (1995, 1997, 1999, 2003, 2012)	5
Netherlands	Top eight in 2024	6 January 2024	21st	1985	2024	21	Champions (1985, 1987, 1989, 1993, 2018, 2024)	3
Spain	Top eight in 2024	6 January 2024	17th	1993	2024	17	Champions (2014, 2020, 2022)	1
Croatia	Top eight in 2024	8 January 2024	7th	2010	2024	6	Eighth place (2022, 2024)	6
France	Top eight in 2024	8 January 2024	17th	1985	2024	7	Third place (1987, 1989)	7
Great Britain	Top eight in 2024	8 January 2024	10th	1985	2024	2	Sixth place (1985)	11
Hungary	Top eight in 2024	8 January 2024	21st	1985	2024	21	Champions (1991, 2001, 2016)	4
Portugal	Top two in Group A	7 June 2025	4th	1995	2016	1	Tenth place (2016)	20
Romania	Top two in Group A	7 June 2025	3rd	2022	2024	3	Eleventh place (2022)	13
Israel	Top two in Group D	7 June 2025	5th	2018	2024	5	Sixth place (2022)	8
Slovakia	Top two in Group D	7 June 2025	5th	1993	2024	4	Eighth place (2020)	12
Germany	Top two in Group B	7 June 2025	21st	1985	2024	6	Third place (1985)	10
Turkey	Top two in Group B	7 June 2025	4th	2016	2024	2	Twelfth place (2016, 2018)	14
Serbia	Top two in Group C	7 June 2025	7th	2006	2024	6	Eighth place (2006)	9
Switzerland	Top two in Group C	8 June 2025	3rd	1993	1995	1	Tenth place (1993)	18

== Format ==
The 13 teams were split into four groups of three and four. The tournament played at a single venue with the group winners and the second-ranked teams qualified for the final tournament.

== Draw ==
The draw took place on 3 March 2025 in Zagreb.

=== Seeding ===
Pot 1	Pot 2	Pot 3	Pot 4	Pot 5
Serbia **(H)**; Germany **(H)**; Slovakia **(H)**; Portugal **(H)**	Israel; Czechia	Turkey; Romania	Malta; Switzerland; Ukraine	Finland; Sweden

=== Draw results ===
Bold text indicates who qualified.

Group A
Team
Czechia
**Romania**
**Portugal**

Group B
Team
**Germany**
**Turkey**
Malta

Group C
Team
**Serbia**
**Switzerland**
Ukraine
Finland

Group D
Team
**Israel**
**Slovakia**
Sweden

== Referees ==
Thirteen referees were selected to officiate at the Qualifiers.

Group A
Referees
Israel	Ayal Gabel
Serbia	Lazar Andjelić
Switzerland	Massimo Castrilli

Group B
Referees
Czechia	Jakub Nečas
Romania	Alexandru-Andrei Mustata
Sweden	Alexandros Vlastos

Group C
Referees
Germany	Richard Noack
Malta	Stefan Licari
Slovakia	Martina Kuníková
Turkey	İlkin Çakmakoğlu

Group D
Referees
Finland	Antti Ruohonen
Portugal	Luis Santos
Ukraine	Anna Goncharenko

== Summary ==
Group winners and runners-up qualified directly for 2026 Women's European Water Polo Championship
Other teams were eliminated

Group A	Group B	Group C	Group D
Portugal Romania	Germany Turkey	Serbia Switzerland	Israel Slovakia
Czechia	Malta	Ukraine	Sweden
		Finland	

== Groups ==
All times are local.

=== Group A ===
- 6–8 June, Setúbal, Portugal.

Pos	Team	Pld	W	PSW	PSL	L	GF	GA	GD	Pts	Qualification
1	Portugal (H)	2	2	0	0	0	31	19	+12	**6**	Final tournament
2	Romania	2	1	0	0	1	19	24	−5	**3**	Final tournament
3	Czechia	2	0	0	0	2	23	30	−7	**0**	

Source: European Aquatics
Rules for classification: 1) points; 2) head-to-head points; 3) head-to-head goal difference; 4) head-to-head number of goals scored; 5) Goal difference.
(H) Host

6 June 2025; 15:00	Report	Czechia	12–**18**	**Portugal**	Manteigadas Municipal Swimming Pool, Setúbal; Referees: Lazar Andjelić (SRB), Massimo Castrilli (SUI)
6 June 2025; 15:00	Report	Score by quarters: **6**–4, 2–**6**, 2–**4**, 2–**4**			Manteigadas Municipal Swimming Pool, Setúbal; Referees: Lazar Andjelić (SRB), Massimo Castrilli (SUI)
6 June 2025; 15:00	Report	Bušauerová 5	**Goals**	Fernandes, Lousa 4	Manteigadas Municipal Swimming Pool, Setúbal; Referees: Lazar Andjelić (SRB), Massimo Castrilli (SUI)

7 June 2025; 15:00	Report	Czechia	11–**12**	Romania	Manteigadas Municipal Swimming Pool, Setúbal; Referees: Lazar Andjelić (SRB), Ayal Gabel (ISR)
7 June 2025; 15:00	Report	Score by quarters: 2–**4**, 3–3, **3**–2, 3–3			Manteigadas Municipal Swimming Pool, Setúbal; Referees: Lazar Andjelić (SRB), Ayal Gabel (ISR)
7 June 2025; 15:00	Report	J. Holá 3	**Goals**	Nagy, Szeghalmi 3	Manteigadas Municipal Swimming Pool, Setúbal; Referees: Lazar Andjelić (SRB), Ayal Gabel (ISR)

8 June 2025; 10:00	Report	Romania	7–**13**	**Portugal**	Manteigadas Municipal Swimming Pool, Setúbal; Referees: Massimo Castrilli (SUI), Ayal Gabel (ISR)
8 June 2025; 10:00	Report	Score by quarters: 1–**3**, 1–**4**, 0–**2**, **5**–4			Manteigadas Municipal Swimming Pool, Setúbal; Referees: Massimo Castrilli (SUI), Ayal Gabel (ISR)
8 June 2025; 10:00	Report	Szeghalmi 3	**Goals**	Machado, Lousa 3	Manteigadas Municipal Swimming Pool, Setúbal; Referees: Massimo Castrilli (SUI), Ayal Gabel (ISR)

=== Group B ===
- 6–8 June, Hanover, Germany.

Pos	Team	Pld	W	PSW	PSL	L	GF	GA	GD	Pts	Qualification
1	Germany (H)	2	2	0	0	0	29	11	+18	**6**	Final tournament
2	Turkey	2	1	0	0	1	30	22	+8	**3**	Final tournament
3	Malta	2	0	0	0	2	9	35	−26	**0**	

Source: European Aquatics
Rules for classification: 1) points; 2) head-to-head points; 3) head-to-head goal difference; 4) head-to-head number of goals scored; 5) Goal difference.
(H) Host

6 June 2025; 19:00	Report	**Germany**	**14**–2	Malta	Volksbad Limmer, Hanover; Referees: Alexandros Vlastos (SWE), Jakub Nečas (CZE)
6 June 2025; 19:00	Report	Score by quarters: **3**–0, **2**–0, **5**–1, **4**–1			Volksbad Limmer, Hanover; Referees: Alexandros Vlastos (SWE), Jakub Nečas (CZE)
6 June 2025; 19:00	Report	G. Deike 5	**Goals**	Borg 2	Volksbad Limmer, Hanover; Referees: Alexandros Vlastos (SWE), Jakub Nečas (CZE)

7 June 2025; 19:00	Report	Malta	7–**21**	**Turkey**	Volksbad Limmer, Hanover; Referees: Alexandru-Andrei Mustata (ROU), Jakub Nečas (CZE)
7 June 2025; 19:00	Report	Score by quarters: 3–**5**, 2–**9**, 1–**3**, 1–**4**			Volksbad Limmer, Hanover; Referees: Alexandru-Andrei Mustata (ROU), Jakub Nečas (CZE)
7 June 2025; 19:00	Report	Borg 2	**Goals**	Buralı 4	Volksbad Limmer, Hanover; Referees: Alexandru-Andrei Mustata (ROU), Jakub Nečas (CZE)

8 June 2025; 13:00	Report	**Germany**	**15**–9	Turkey	Volksbad Limmer, Hanover; Referees: Alexandros Vlastos (SWE), Alexandru-Andrei Mustata (ROU)
8 June 2025; 13:00	Report	Score by quarters: **8**–4, **2**–1, 3–3, **2**–1			Volksbad Limmer, Hanover; Referees: Alexandros Vlastos (SWE), Alexandru-Andrei Mustata (ROU)
8 June 2025; 13:00	Report	G. Deike 5	**Goals**	Dabbağ 3	Volksbad Limmer, Hanover; Referees: Alexandros Vlastos (SWE), Alexandru-Andrei Mustata (ROU)

=== Group C ===
- 6–8 June, Novi Sad, Serbia.

Pos	Team	Pld	W	PSW	PSL	L	GF	GA	GD	Pts	Qualification
1	Serbia (H)	3	3	0	0	0	72	16	+56	**9**	Final tournament
2	Switzerland	3	2	0	0	1	38	40	−2	**6**	Final tournament
3	Ukraine	3	1	0	0	2	29	35	−6	**3**	
4	Finland	3	0	0	0	3	23	71	−48	**0**	

Source: European Aquatics
Rules for classification: 1) points; 2) head-to-head points; 3) head-to-head goal difference; 4) head-to-head number of goals scored; 5) Goal difference.
(H) Host

6 June 2025; 18:00	Report	**Serbia**	**18**–2	Ukraine	Slana Bara, Novi Sad; Referees: Martina Kuníková (SVK), Stefan Licari (MLT)
6 June 2025; 18:00	Report	Score by quarters: **3**–0, **4**–0, **5**–1, **6**–1			Slana Bara, Novi Sad; Referees: Martina Kuníková (SVK), Stefan Licari (MLT)
6 June 2025; 18:00	Report	Ilić, Milićević 4	**Goals**	Lytvyniuk, Tymoshenko 1	Slana Bara, Novi Sad; Referees: Martina Kuníková (SVK), Stefan Licari (MLT)

6 June 2025; 19:45	Report	**Switzerland**	**21**–9	Finland	Slana Bara, Novi Sad; Referees: İlkin Çakmakoğlu (TUR)
6 June 2025; 19:45	Report	Score by quarters: **7**–2, **6**–1, **4**–2, 4–4			Slana Bara, Novi Sad; Referees: İlkin Çakmakoğlu (TUR)
6 June 2025; 19:45	Report	Verhagen 6	**Goals**	Alava, Kaipainen 3	Slana Bara, Novi Sad; Referees: İlkin Çakmakoğlu (TUR)

7 June 2025; 18:00	Report	**Serbia**	**24**–7	Switzerland	Slana Bara, Novi Sad; Referees: Martina Kuníková (SVK), Richard Noach (GER)
7 June 2025; 18:00	Report	Score by quarters: **4**–3, **7**–2, **7**–1, **6**–1			Slana Bara, Novi Sad; Referees: Martina Kuníková (SVK), Richard Noach (GER)
7 June 2025; 18:00	Report	Diaz Mesa, Milićević 5	**Goals**	Verhagen 2	Slana Bara, Novi Sad; Referees: Martina Kuníková (SVK), Richard Noach (GER)

7 June 2025; 19:45	Report	**Ukraine**	**20**–7	Finland	Slana Bara, Novi Sad; Referees: İlkin Çakmakoğlu (TUR), Stefan Licari (MLT)
7 June 2025; 19:45	Report	Score by quarters: **3**–2, **6**–3, **6**–1, **5**–1			Slana Bara, Novi Sad; Referees: İlkin Çakmakoğlu (TUR), Stefan Licari (MLT)
7 June 2025; 19:45	Report	Belinska 5	**Goals**	Suvanto 2	Slana Bara, Novi Sad; Referees: İlkin Çakmakoğlu (TUR), Stefan Licari (MLT)

8 June 2025; 11:00	Report	Ukraine	7–**10**	**Switzerland**	Slana Bara, Novi Sad; Referees: Martina Kuníková (SVK), İlkin Çakmakoğlu (TUR)
8 June 2025; 11:00	Report	Score by quarters: 0–**1**, 2–**4**, 2–**4**, **3**–1			Slana Bara, Novi Sad; Referees: Martina Kuníková (SVK), İlkin Çakmakoğlu (TUR)
8 June 2025; 11:00	Report	Zelenko 3	**Goals**	Kohli 4	Slana Bara, Novi Sad; Referees: Martina Kuníková (SVK), İlkin Çakmakoğlu (TUR)

8 June 2025; 12:45	Report	**Serbia**	**30**–7	Finland	Slana Bara, Novi Sad; Referees: Richard Noach (GER), Stefan Licari (MLT)
8 June 2025; 12:45	Report	Score by quarters: **5**–1, **11**–1, **8**–3, **6**–2			Slana Bara, Novi Sad; Referees: Richard Noach (GER), Stefan Licari (MLT)
8 June 2025; 12:45	Report	Milićević 6	**Goals**	Kaipainen 3	Slana Bara, Novi Sad; Referees: Richard Noach (GER), Stefan Licari (MLT)

=== Group D ===
- 6–8 June, Nováky, Slovakia.

Pos	Team	Pld	W	PSW	PSL	L	GF	GA	GD	Pts	Qualification
1	Israel	2	2	0	0	0	43	19	+24	**6**	Final tournament
2	Slovakia (H)	2	1	0	0	1	27	28	−1	**3**	Final tournament
3	Sweden	2	0	0	0	2	15	38	−23	**0**	

Source: European Aquatics
Rules for classification: 1) points; 2) head-to-head points; 3) head-to-head goal difference; 4) head-to-head number of goals scored; 5) Goal difference.
(H) Host

6 June 2025; 18:00	Report	**Israel**	**22**–8	Sweden	National Water Polo Centre, Nováky; Referees: Anna Goncharenko (UKR), Jarkko Virtanen (FIN)
6 June 2025; 18:00	Report	Score by quarters: **8**–1, **5**–3, **6**–2, **3**–2			National Water Polo Centre, Nováky; Referees: Anna Goncharenko (UKR), Jarkko Virtanen (FIN)
6 June 2025; 18:00	Report	Bogachenko 4	**Goals**	Hassler, Hazell 2	National Water Polo Centre, Nováky; Referees: Anna Goncharenko (UKR), Jarkko Virtanen (FIN)

7 June 2025; 18:00	Report	**Slovakia**	**16**–7	Sweden	National Water Polo Centre, Nováky; Referees: Jarkko Virtanen (FIN), Luis Santos (POR)
7 June 2025; 18:00	Report	Score by quarters: **3**–2, **4**–1, **4**–2, **5**–2			National Water Polo Centre, Nováky; Referees: Jarkko Virtanen (FIN), Luis Santos (POR)
7 June 2025; 18:00	Report	Kolářová 4	**Goals**	Lindman Long 3	National Water Polo Centre, Nováky; Referees: Jarkko Virtanen (FIN), Luis Santos (POR)

8 June 2025; 11:00	Report	Slovakia	11–**21**	**Israel**	National Water Polo Centre, Nováky; Referees: Luis Santos (POR), Anna Goncharenko (UKR)
8 June 2025; 11:00	Report	Score by quarters: 1–**5**, 2–**4**, 5–5, 3–**7**			National Water Polo Centre, Nováky; Referees: Luis Santos (POR), Anna Goncharenko (UKR)
8 June 2025; 11:00	Report	Sedláková 3	**Goals**	Markovsky, Rahoum 4	National Water Polo Centre, Nováky; Referees: Luis Santos (POR), Anna Goncharenko (UKR)
