= Water polo at the 2028 Summer Olympics – Women's qualification =

The women's qualification for the Olympic water polo tournament will occur between February 2027 and April 2028, allocating twelve teams for the final tournament. As the host nation, the United States reserves a direct spot each for the men's team.

The remainder of the total quota will be attributed to the eligible NOCs through a tripartite qualification pathway. First, the 2027 World Aquatics Championships, will produce the winners and runners-up of the water polo tournament qualifying. Five more quota places will be awarded to the highest-ranked eligible NOC at each of the continental meets (Africa, Americas, Asia, Europe, and Oceania) approved by World Aquatics.

The last three quota places will be assigned to the top three teams of the world qualifier.

== Qualification summary ==
Qualification	Date	Host	Vacancies	Qualified
Host country	—N/a		1	United States
2027 World Cup	24–28 February 2027	(Greece) Athens	1	
2027 World Aquatics Championships	26 June – 9 July 2027	(Hungary) Budapest	2	
2027 Pan American Games	23 July – 8 August 2027	(Peru) Lima	1	
2028 European Championships	January – February 2028	(Netherlands) Eindhoven	1	
2027 Asian Championships	9-15 March 2027	(Malaysia) Kuala Lumpur	1	
Africa	TBD	TBD	1	
Oceania	December 2027	(Australia)	1	
World Aquatics World Qualifier	April 3–9, 2028	TBD	3	
Total			12	
