= Maria Myriokefalitaki =

Greek water polo player

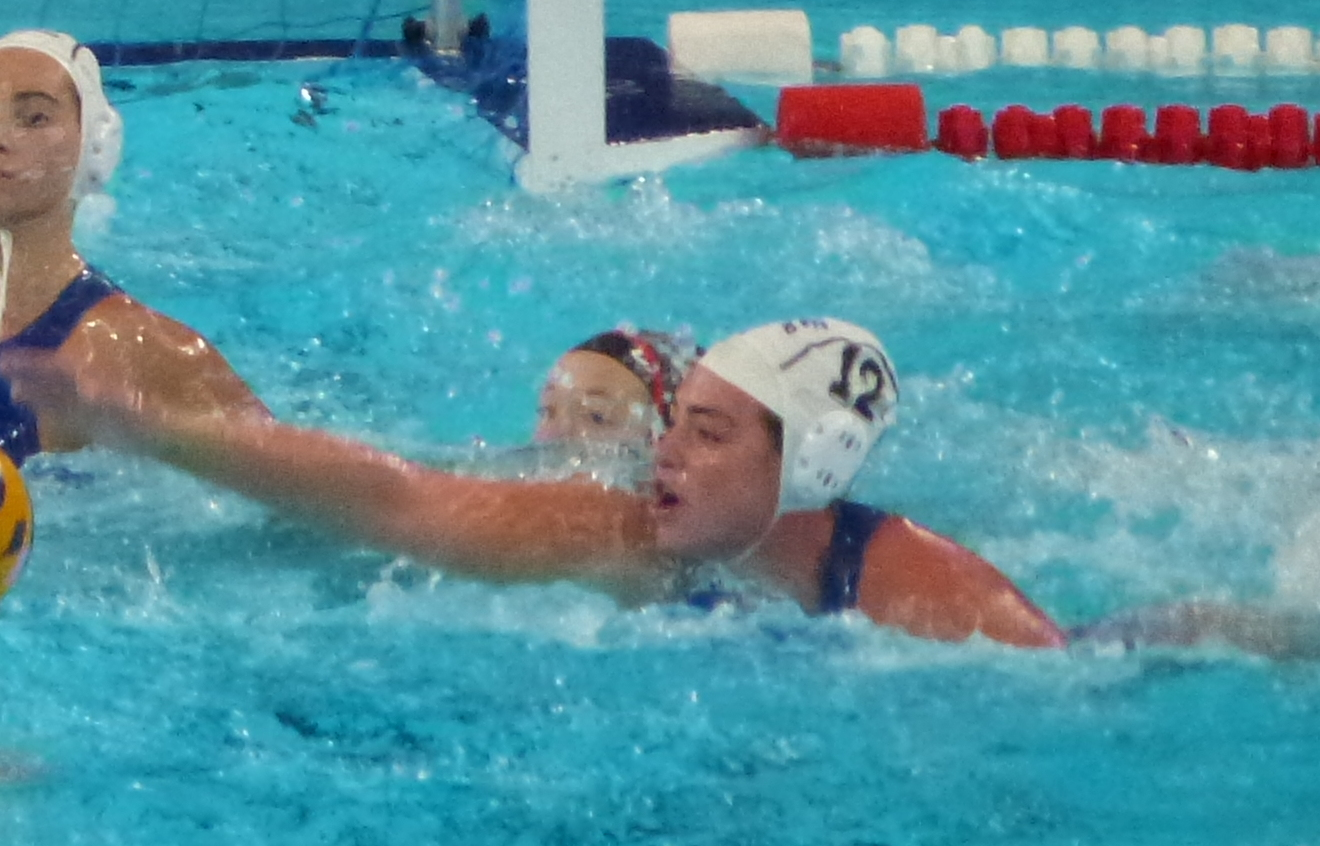
- Myriokefalitaki in 2024

Personal information
- Nationality: Greek
- Born: 8 January 2001 (age 25) Rethymno
- Occupation: Water polo player
Medal record
Women's water polo
Representing Greece
World Championship
Gold medal – first place	2025 Singapore	Team
European Championship
Silver medal – second place	2022 Split
Bronze medal – third place	2026 Funchal

Maria Myriokefalitaki (born 8 January 2001 in Rethymno) is an international Greek water polo player, who plays as a centre forward and is a key member of the Olympiacos SFP women's water polo team as well as the Greek national team.

She is regarded as one of the best center forwards in world water polo.

== Career ==
Myriokefalitaki began her career in 2011 in Rethymno with the Nautical Club of Rethymno (N.O.R.). In 2013, she made her first appearance with the club's women's team, and in 2016 she helped the club secure third place in the national championship, and the same year, she made her European debut. In 2017, she joined Olympiacos Piraeus, contributing to the team's successes. In 2019, she became the top scorer at the Youth World Championship in Belgrade, scoring 29 goals in 6 matches. In the third-place match, she scored five goals against Australia, helping Greece win the bronze medal.

In the 2022 Euro League final, she scored three goals playing a decisive role in Olympiacos' trophy win. In 2021, she renewed her contract with Olympiacos for four more years, until the summer of 2025.

Myriokefalitaki plays a key role as a basic member of the Greek national team as a center forward. In the match against Hungary, during the 2025 World Cup qualifiers, she was named the Most Valuable Player. In the 2025 World Cup semifinal in Chengdu, she scored five goals against Italy, helping Greece advance to the final.

== Titles and achievements ==
=== With Olympiacos Piraeus ===
- Greek Championships: 7 (2018, 2019, 2020, 2021, 2022, 2023, 2024)
- Greek Cups: 6 (2018, 2020, 2021, 2022, 2023, 2025)
- Greek Super Cup: 2 (2020, 2024)
- Euro League: 2 (2021, 2022)
- LEN Super Cup: 2 (2021, 2022)

=== With Greek national team ===
- Silver medal at the Women's Youth World Championship (2017)
- Bronze medal at the Youth World Championship (2019)
- Silver medal at the Women's Youth World Championship (2021)
- Silver medal at the European Championship (2022)
- 7th place at the Summer Olympics: Paris (2024)
- Gold medal at the Water Polo World Cup (2025)
- Gold medal at the World Aquatics Championships (2025)
