= 2028 Women's European Water Polo Championship =

Water polo tournament

Europees kampioenschap waterpolo vrouwen 2028 (in Dutch)

Tournament details
- Country: Netherlands
- City: Eindhoven
- Venue: Pieter van den Hoogenband Zwemstadion
- Dates: January – February 2028
- Teams: 16 (from 1 confederation)

The 2028 Women's European Water Polo Championship will be the 22nd edition of the biannual continental championship for women's national water polo teams, organised by Europe's governing aquatics body, European Aquatics. The tournament will be played from January to February 2028.

On 2 June 2026, Netherlands was awarded the hosting rights for the first time with Eindhoven being selected as the host city. This will be the third edition to have different hosts for both genders after European Aquatics made the change permanent in March 2025.

For the third time, 16 teams will be participating in the tournament, following the expansion in 2024. The top eight teams from the 2026 edition qualified automatically, while the remaining eight teams will progress via qualification.

This tournament acts as a qualifier for the Water polo tournament in Los Angeles, 2029 World Aquatics Championships in Beijing and the 2030 European Championship edition.

Netherlands are the two-time defending champions, most recently beating Hungary, 5–3 on penalties after a 10–10 draw in the final in Funchal.

== Host selection ==
- (Netherlands) Eindhoven

On 2 June 2026, Eindhoven was given the hosting rights. This will be Netherlands' third time hosting after 2012 and 2024.

== Format ==
The 16 teams will be drawn into four groups of four teams. In each group, there are two teams from the last tournament and two teams from the qualifiers. They will play a round-robin in their groups. The top two teams of each group will advance to the main round (Group A & Group C formed Group E and Group B & Group D formed Group F) with all results against the teams that advance as well carried over. The bottom two teams will be dropping to the classification round, which will be played in a similar style to the main round.

In the main round, the teams will play against opponents from the other first-round group. From this round, the top-two ranked teams of each group will advance to the semifinals; the other teams will dropp to the 5th–8th place semifinals.

In the classification round, the teams play against opponents from the other first-round group. Then each team will play one classification game for the final position.

The four remaining teams will progress to the knockout stage, where two semifinals and a final will determine the European champions.

== Qualification ==
16 teams will be able to compete at the main event. They are broken up as follows:

- The top eight teams from the 2026 European Championship not already qualified as host nation
- Final eight from the qualifiers.

Event	Date	Location	Quotas	Nation(s)
2026 European Championship	26 January – 5 February	(Portugal) Funchal	8	Netherlands; Hungary; Greece; Italy; Spain; Croatia; Israel; France
Qualifiers	TBD	(N/A)	2	
Qualifiers	TBD	(N/A)	2	
Qualifiers	TBD	(N/A)	2	
Qualifiers	TBD	(N/A)	2	

== Venue ==
Similar to 2012 and 2024, the Pieter van den Hoogenband Zwemstadion will be used for the entire competition.

2028 Women's European Water Polo Championship is located in Netherlands	Eindhoven
2028 Women's European Water Polo Championship is located in Netherlands	Pieter van den Hoogenband Zwemstadion
2028 Women's European Water Polo Championship is located in Netherlands	Capacity: 2,065
