= Lieke Rogge =

Dutch water polo player (born 2000)

Personal information
- Nationality: Dutch
- Born: 30 November 2000 (age 25)
- Height: 175 cm (5 ft 9 in)
Medal record
Olympic Games
Bronze medal – third place	2024 Paris	Team
European Championship
Gold medal – first place	2024 Eindhoven
Gold medal – first place	2026 Funchal

Lieke Rogge (born 30 November 2000) is a Dutch water polo player. She represented Netherlands at the 2024 Summer Olympics.
