= Water polo at the 2027 World Aquatics Championships – Women's tournament =

Tournament details
- Host country: Hungary
- Venue: 1 (in 1a host cities)
- Dates: 26 June – 9 July
- Teams: 16 (from 5 confederations)

The women's water polo tournament at the 2027 World Aquatics Championships will be held from 26 June to 9 July 2027. This will be the 19th time that the women's water polo tournament has been played since the first edition in 1986.

== Qualification ==
Qualification takes place between July 2026 and 2027, with a mix of international competitions organised by World Aquatics and continental championships held by the regional bodies acting as qualification. The slot allocation was as follows:

Event	Dates	Hosts	Quota	Qualifier(s)
Host nation	—N/a	—N/a	1	Hungary
2026 World Cup	21 April – 26 July 2026	(Australia) Sydney	3	Australia; Spain; United States
2026 European Championship	26 January – 5 February 2026	(Portugal) Funchal	3	Greece; Italy; Netherlands
2026 Asian Games	20 September – 3 October 2026	(Japan) Nagoya	2	China; Japan
2027 Pan American Championship	2027	(Colombia) Barranquilla	2	
2027 African Championship	2027		1	
Oceanian selection	—N/a	—N/a	1	
World ranking	—N/a	—N/a	3	
Total			16	
