= Turkey women's national water polo team =

Turkey
- FINA code: TUR
- Association: Turkish Water Polo Federation
- Confederation: LEN (Europe)
- Head coach: Hakan Şahbaz
- Asst coach: Sami Akgöz; İsa Üzer
- Captain: Kübra Kuş

European Championship
- Appearances: 4 (first in 2016)
- Best result: 12th (2016, 2018)

The Turkey women's water polo team is a water polo team that represents Turkey at water polo competitions.

== Results ==
=== European Championship ===
European Water Polo Championship
Year	Round	Pld	W	D	L	GS	GA	GD
2016	12th place	6	0	0	6	18	132	−114
2018	12th place	6	0	0	6	32	131	−99
2024	13th place	5	2	0	3	42	45	−3
2026	13th place	6	2	1	3	72	79	−9
Total	4/21	23	4	1	18	164	387	−225

=== Mediterranean Games ===
Water polo at the Mediterranean Games
Year	Round	Pld	W	D	L	GS	GA	GD
2018	6th Place	3	0	0	3	17	59	−42
Total	1/1	3	0	0	3	17	59	−42

== Current squad ==
Roster for the 2018 Women's European Water Polo Championship.

Head coach: Hakan Şahbaz

No	Name	Date of birth	Position	L/R	Height	Weight	Club
1	Elif Dilara Aydınlık	19 July 1999 (age 26)	Goalkeeper	R	1.86 m (6 ft 1 in)	80 kg (180 lb)	(Turkey) Galatasaray
2	Zeynep Visha	3 March 2000 (age 25)	Wing	R	1.69 m (5 ft 7 in)	55 kg (121 lb)	(Turkey) ESTI Izmir
3	Dilara Buralı	27 March 2000 (age 25)	Centre forward	R	1.86 m (6 ft 1 in)	80 kg (180 lb)	(Turkey) Galatasaray
4	Ecehan Gökçe Temel	12 April 2000 (age 25)	Defender	R	1.77 m (5 ft 10 in)	55 kg (121 lb)	(Turkey) Galatasaray
5	Karya Köse	20 January 1997 (age 29)	Defender	R	1.73 m (5 ft 8 in)	67 kg (148 lb)	(Turkey) ESTI Izmir
6	Selina Colak	1 March 2001 (age 24)	Centre forward	R	1.64 m (5 ft 5 in)	59 kg (130 lb)	(Turkey) ESTI Izmir
7	Zeynep Özgümüş	17 July 2000 (age 25)	Wing	L	1.70 m (5 ft 7 in)	62 kg (137 lb)	(Turkey) Galatasaray
8	Yağmur Elma	19 January 1996 (age 30)	Field player	R	1.64 m (5 ft 5 in)	63 kg (139 lb)	(Turkey) ESTI Izmir
9	Ipek Altan	11 May 1991 (age 34)	Defender	R	1.75 m (5 ft 9 in)	68 kg (150 lb)	(Netherlands) Zwemvereniging Het Y
10	Kübra Kuş (C)	9 October 1994 (age 31)	Centre forward	R	1.70 m (5 ft 7 in)	80 kg (180 lb)	(Turkey) ESTI Izmir
11	Doğa Cengiz	14 September 2001 (age 24)	Defender	R	1.75 m (5 ft 9 in)	75 kg (165 lb)	(Turkey) Galatasaray
12	Ayça Duran	25 August 2003 (age 22)	Defender	R	1.77 m (5 ft 10 in)	55 kg (121 lb)	(Turkey) Odtu Sport Club
13	Yaren Baki	26 November 1999 (age 26)	Goalkeeper	R	1.80 m (5 ft 11 in)	76 kg (168 lb)	(Turkey) Hannover
