= Marta Cabanas =

Spanish water polo referee

- Born: 1994 (age 31–32)
- Occupation: Water polo referee

Marta Cabanas (Sabadell, 1994) is a Spanish water polo referee.

She became the first Spanish and Catalan female referee to officiate at major international competitions under World Aquatics, including the European Championships, World Championships, and the Olympic Games.

In 2024, she was selected to officiate at the 2024 Summer Olympics in Paris, becoming the first Spanish female water polo referee. In this tournament, she officiated the bronze-medal match, Holland vs. USA.
