= 1995 Women's European Water Polo Championship =

Tournament details
- Host country: Austria
- Venue(s): 1 (in 1 host city)
- Dates: 18 – 27 August
- Teams: 16 (from 1 confederation)

Final positions
- Champions: Italy (1st title)
- Runner-up: Hungary
- Third place: Netherlands
- Fourth place: Greece

The 1995 Women's European Water Polo Championship was the sixth edition of the bi-annual event, organised by the Europe's governing body in aquatics, the Ligue Européenne de Natation. The event took place in Vienna, Austria from August 18 to August 27, 1995, as an integrated part of the European LC Championships 1995.

== Teams ==
Group A

- France
- Portugal
- Russia

Group B

- Czech Republic
- Great Britain
- Hungary

Group C

- Greece
- Netherlands
- Spain

Group D

- Germany
- Italy
- Switzerland

== First round ==
=== Group A ===
| | Team | Points | G | W | D | L | GF | GA | Diff |
|---|---|---|---|---|---|---|---|---|---|
| 1. | Russia | 4 | 2 | 2 | 0 | 0 | 35 | 8 | +27 |
| 2. | France | 2 | 2 | 1 | 0 | 1 | 20 | 18 | +2 |
| 3. | Portugal | 0 | 2 | 0 | 0 | 2 | 3 | 32 | −29 |

| Russia | 19–1 | Portugal |
| France | 7–16 | Russia |
| France | 13–2 | Portugal |

=== Group B ===
| | Team | Points | G | W | D | L | GF | GA | Diff |
|---|---|---|---|---|---|---|---|---|---|
| 1. | Hungary | 4 | 2 | 2 | 0 | 0 | 22 | 3 | +19 |
| 2. | Great Britain | 2 | 2 | 1 | 0 | 1 | 14 | 20 | −6 |
| 3. | Czech Republic | 0 | 2 | 0 | 0 | 2 | 9 | 22 | −13 |

| Hungary | 10–1 | Czech Republic |
| Great Britain | 2–12 | Hungary |
| Great Britain | 12–8 | Czech Republic |

=== Group C ===
| | Team | Points | G | W | D | L | GF | GA | Diff |
|---|---|---|---|---|---|---|---|---|---|
| 1. | Netherlands | 4 | 2 | 2 | 0 | 0 | 24 | 12 | +12 |
| 2. | Greece | 2 | 2 | 1 | 0 | 1 | 17 | 11 | +6 |
| 3. | Spain | 0 | 2 | 0 | 0 | 2 | 10 | 28 | −18 |

| Netherlands | 17–6 | Spain |
| Greece | 6–7 | Netherlands |
| Greece | 10–5 | Spain |

=== Group D ===
| | Team | Points | G | W | D | L | GF | GA | Diff |
|---|---|---|---|---|---|---|---|---|---|
| 1. | Italy | 4 | 2 | 2 | 0 | 0 | 27 | 5 | +22 |
| 2. | Germany | 2 | 2 | 1 | 0 | 1 | 18 | 8 | +10 |
| 3. | Switzerland | 0 | 2 | 0 | 0 | 2 | 1 | 33 | −32 |

| Italy | 19–1 | Switzerland |
| Germany | 4–8 | Italy |
| Germany | 14–0 | Switzerland |

== Second round ==
=== Group E ===
| | Team | Points | G | W | D | L | GF | GA | Diff |
|---|---|---|---|---|---|---|---|---|---|
| 1. | Greece | 6 | 3 | 3 | 0 | 0 | 26 | 21 | +5 |
| 2. | Hungary | 4 | 3 | 2 | 0 | 1 | 27 | 23 | +4 |
| 3. | Russia | 2 | 3 | 1 | 0 | 2 | 27 | 24 | +3 |
| 4. | Germany | 0 | 3 | 0 | 0 | 3 | 25 | 37 | −12 |

| Russia | 16–8 | Germany |
| Hungary | 7–9 | Greece |

| Germany | 11–12 | Greece |
| Russia | 8–11 | Hungary |

| Hungary | 9–6 | Germany |
| Greece | 5–3 | Russia |

=== Group F ===
| | Team | Points | G | W | D | L | GF | GA | Diff |
|---|---|---|---|---|---|---|---|---|---|
| 1. | Netherlands | 5 | 3 | 2 | 1 | 0 | 39 | 21 | +18 |
| 2. | Italy | 5 | 3 | 2 | 1 | 0 | 33 | 19 | +14 |
| 3. | France | 2 | 3 | 1 | 0 | 2 | 24 | 32 | −8 |
| 4. | Great Britain | 0 | 3 | 0 | 0 | 3 | 21 | 45 | −24 |

| Netherlands | 16–4 | Great Britain |
| Italy | 7–4 | France |

| Great Britain | 11–12 | France |
| Netherlands | 9–9 | Italy |

| Italy | 17–6 | Great Britain |
| Netherlands | 14–8 | France |

=== GROUP G (9th–12th places) ===
| | Team | Points | G | W | D | L | GF | GA | Diff |
|---|---|---|---|---|---|---|---|---|---|
| 9. | Spain | 6 | 3 | 3 | 0 | 0 | 52 | 7 | +45 |
| 10. | Czech Republic | 3 | 3 | 1 | 1 | 1 | 22 | 25 | −3 |
| 11. | Portugal | 2 | 3 | 1 | 0 | 2 | 13 | 38 | −25 |
| 12. | Switzerland | 1 | 3 | 0 | 1 | 2 | 16 | 33 | −17 |

| Portugal | 9–4 | Switzerland |
| Czech Republic | 2–14 | Spain |

| Spain | 17–5 | Switzerland |
| Portugal | 4–13 | Czech Republic |

| Czech Republic | 7–7 | Switzerland |
| Portugal | 0–21 | Spain |

== Semifinals ==
| Hungary | 6–5 | Netherlands |
| Greece | 4–8 | Italy |

== Finals ==
- August 26, 1995 — 7th place

| Germany | 18–7 | Great Britain |

- August 26, 1995 — 5th place

| Russia | 6–8 | France |

- August 27, 1995 — Bronze Medal

| Netherlands | 8–3 | Greece |

- August 27, 1995 — Gold Medal

| Italy | 7–5 | Hungary |

== Final ranking ==
| RANK | TEAM |
|---|---|
| | Italy |
| | Hungary |
| | Netherlands |
| 4. | Greece |
| 5. | France |
| 6. | Russia |
| 7. | Germany |
| 8. | Great Britain |
| 9. | Spain |
| 10. | Czech Republic |
| 11. | Portugal |
| 12. | Switzerland |

1995 Women's European champion

Italy
First title

== Individual awards ==
- Most Valuable Player
  - ???
- Best Goalkeeper
  - ???
- Topscorer
  - ???
