= 2024 Women's European Water Polo Championship =

Water polo tournament in Eindhoven, Netherlands

Tournament details
- Host country: Netherlands
- Venue: 1 (in 1 host city)
- Dates: 5–13 January
- Teams: 16 (from 1 confederation)

Final positions
- Champions: Netherlands (6th title)
- Runners-up: Spain
- Third place: Greece
- Fourth place: Italy

Tournament statistics
- Matches played: 48
- Goals scored: 1,091 (22.73 per match)
- Top scorers: (Hungary) Rita Keszthelyi (Romania) Alina-Ioana Olteanu (Germany) Belen Vosseberg (21 goals each)

Awards
- Best player: (Spain) Beatriz Ortiz
- Best goalkeeper: (Netherlands) Laura Aarts

The 2024 Women's European Water Polo Championship was the 20th edition of the tournament. It was held in Eindhoven, Netherlands from 5 to 13 January 2024. It was scheduled to be held in Netanya, Israel, But the competition was taken away from Israel for security reasons after the Gaza war commenced. This edition was the first one to be played by 16 teams.

The Netherlands won their sixth title, after a finals win over Spain, while Greece captured the bronze medal and qualified for the 2024 Olympics.

== Host selection ==
The championship was originally going to be held in Tel Aviv, Israel between 7 and 21 October 2023 (although it would still be called the 2024 European Championship). But on 31 March 2023, it was moved to the Israeli city of Netanya and rescheduled for 3 to 16 January 2024 at the Wingate Institute Olympic swimming pool. This decision was made to reduce the travel costs for the participating teams and make sure there was only one stoppage during the season instead of two (due to the 2024 World Aquatics Championships being held in February 2024).

However, after the Gaza war broke out, LEN said they would monitor the situation on 12 October. But on 2 November, LEN announced that the tournament would not be hosted in Israel.

After that announcement, Budapest, Eindhoven and Zagreb were reported as possibly interested in hosting the championships.

On 17 November, Eindhoven was announced as the host city for the tournament. The last time Eindhoven hosted the event was in 2012.

== Expansion ==
During the 2022 European Championships, Israeli media said that the 2024 edition would expand to 16 teams. On 31 March 2023, LEN officially announced the expansion to 16 teams, alongside the format change.

== Format ==
This was the first edition where the teams were sorted into two Divisions, based on the last edition and the qualifiers. The top eight teams made Division 1 and the other eight teams Division 2. Both divisions were split into two groups of four teams. The top-two teams from each group of Division 1 advanced to the quarterfinals, while the other teams met the top-two sides from each group of Division 2 in a play-off round. After that, a knock-out system was used.

== Qualification ==
16 teams were able to compete at the main event. They were broken up as follows:

- The host nation
- The top seven teams from the 2022 European Championship not already qualified as host nation
- Final eight from the qualifiers.

All 12 that participated in 2022 qualified. Of the beneficiaries of the expansion, Bulgaria made their debut. Of the returnees, Czech Republic, Great Britain and Turkey returned after last qualifying in 1997, 2014 and 2018 respectively.

As of 2026, this was the last time Bulgaria and Czech Republic qualified and the last time Portugal and Switzerland failed to qualify.

Event	Date	Location	Quotas	Nation(s)
Host	13 May 2022	–	1	Israel
2022 European Championship	29 August – 10 September	(Croatia) Split	7	Spain; Greece; Italy; Netherlands; Hungary; France; Croatia
Qualifiers	23–25 June 2023	Various	8	Slovakia; Romania; Serbia; Great Britain; Bulgaria; Turkey; Czech Republic; Germany

== Venue ==
Similar to 2012, the Pieter van den Hoogenband Zwemstadion was used for the entire competition.

2024 Women's European Water Polo Championship is located in Netherlands	Eindhoven
2024 Women's European Water Polo Championship is located in Netherlands	Pieter van den Hoogenband Zwemstadion
2024 Women's European Water Polo Championship is located in Netherlands	Capacity: 2,065

== Draw ==
The draw was held on 12 September 2023 in Netanya, Israel.

Division 1

The pots for Division 1 were decided by the rankings of the 2022 European Championship

Pot 1	Pot 2	Pot 3	Pot 4
Spain; Greece	Italy; Netherlands	Hungary; Israel	France; Croatia

Division 2

The seeding for Division 2 was decided by who finished first and second in the qualifiers.

Pot 1	Pot 2
Slovakia; Romania; Serbia; Great Britain	Bulgaria; Turkey; Czech Republic; Germany

== Preliminary round ==
The schedule was announced on 24 November 2023.

All times are local (UTC+1).

=== Division 1 ===
==== Group A ====
Pos	Team	Pld	W	PSW	PSL	L	GF	GA	GD	Pts	Qualification
1	Netherlands (H)	3	3	0	0	0	53	27	+26	9	Quarterfinals
2	Greece	3	2	0	0	1	49	35	+14	6	Quarterfinals
3	Hungary	3	1	0	0	2	40	30	+10	3	Playoffs
4	Croatia	3	0	0	0	3	16	66	−50	0	Playoffs

Source: LEN
Rules for classification: 1) points; 2) head-to-head points; 3) head-to-head goal difference; 4) head-to-head number of goals scored; 5) Goal difference.
(H) Host

5 January 2024; 19:00	Report	Netherlands	24–6	Croatia	Pieter van den Hoogenband Zwemstadion, Eindhoven; Referees: Ivanka Raković Krstonošić (SRB), Anne Grandin (FRA)
5 January 2024; 19:00	Report	Score by quarters: 5–2, 6–2, 7–1, 6–1			Pieter van den Hoogenband Zwemstadion, Eindhoven; Referees: Ivanka Raković Krstonošić (SRB), Anne Grandin (FRA)
5 January 2024; 19:00	Report	Keuning, Rogge 4	Goals	Brnetić, J. Butić 2	Pieter van den Hoogenband Zwemstadion, Eindhoven; Referees: Ivanka Raković Krstonošić (SRB), Anne Grandin (FRA)

5 January 2024; 20:30	Report	Hungary	12–14	Greece	Pieter van den Hoogenband Zwemstadion, Eindhoven; Referees: Alessia Ferrari (ITA), Juan Carlos Colominas (ESP)
5 January 2024; 20:30	Report	Score by quarters: 4–4, 2–2, 4–3, 2–5			Pieter van den Hoogenband Zwemstadion, Eindhoven; Referees: Alessia Ferrari (ITA), Juan Carlos Colominas (ESP)
5 January 2024; 20:30	Report	three players 3	Goals	Giannopoulou 4	Pieter van den Hoogenband Zwemstadion, Eindhoven; Referees: Alessia Ferrari (ITA), Juan Carlos Colominas (ESP)

6 January 2024; 16:00	Report	Greece	25–8	Croatia	Pieter van den Hoogenband Zwemstadion, Eindhoven; Referees: Radosław Koryzna (POL), Maxim Gerasimov (GBR)
6 January 2024; 16:00	Report	Score by quarters: 5–4, 7–1, 6–1, 7–2			Pieter van den Hoogenband Zwemstadion, Eindhoven; Referees: Radosław Koryzna (POL), Maxim Gerasimov (GBR)
6 January 2024; 16:00	Report	Elliniadi, Xenaki 5	Goals	Glas, Janković 2	Pieter van den Hoogenband Zwemstadion, Eindhoven; Referees: Radosław Koryzna (POL), Maxim Gerasimov (GBR)

6 January 2024; 19:00	Report	Netherlands	14–11	Hungary	Pieter van den Hoogenband Zwemstadion, Eindhoven; Referees: Matan Schwartz (ISR), Philip Uhlig (GER)
6 January 2024; 19:00	Report	Score by quarters: 4–1, 1–3, 5–4, 4–3			Pieter van den Hoogenband Zwemstadion, Eindhoven; Referees: Matan Schwartz (ISR), Philip Uhlig (GER)
6 January 2024; 19:00	Report	Rogge 4	Goals	Garda, Keszthelyi 3	Pieter van den Hoogenband Zwemstadion, Eindhoven; Referees: Matan Schwartz (ISR), Philip Uhlig (GER)

7 January 2024; 18:30	Report	Netherlands	15–10	Greece	Pieter van den Hoogenband Zwemstadion, Eindhoven; Referees: Radosław Koryzna (POL), Matan Schwartz (ISR)
7 January 2024; 18:30	Report	Score by quarters: 4–3, 5–1, 2–3, 4–3			Pieter van den Hoogenband Zwemstadion, Eindhoven; Referees: Radosław Koryzna (POL), Matan Schwartz (ISR)
7 January 2024; 18:30	Report	Van de Kraats 5	Goals	three players 2	Pieter van den Hoogenband Zwemstadion, Eindhoven; Referees: Radosław Koryzna (POL), Matan Schwartz (ISR)

7 January 2024; 20:00	Report	Hungary	17–2	Croatia	Pieter van den Hoogenband Zwemstadion, Eindhoven; Referees: Martina Kuníková (SVK), Ivo Mareš (CZE)
7 January 2024; 20:00	Report	Score by quarters: 5–1, 6–0, 3–1, 3–0			Pieter van den Hoogenband Zwemstadion, Eindhoven; Referees: Martina Kuníková (SVK), Ivo Mareš (CZE)
7 January 2024; 20:00	Report	Garda, Leimeter 4	Goals	Janković, Rozić 1	Pieter van den Hoogenband Zwemstadion, Eindhoven; Referees: Martina Kuníková (SVK), Ivo Mareš (CZE)

==== Group B ====
Pos	Team	Pld	W	PSW	PSL	L	GF	GA	GD	Pts	Qualification
1	Spain	3	3	0	0	0	53	23	+30	9	Quarterfinals
2	Italy	3	2	0	0	1	40	31	+9	6	Quarterfinals
3	France	3	1	0	0	2	30	37	−7	3	Playoffs
4	Israel	3	0	0	0	3	26	58	−32	0	Playoffs

Source: LEN
Rules for classification: 1) points; 2) head-to-head points; 3) head-to-head goal difference; 4) head-to-head number of goals scored; 5) Goal difference.

5 January 2024; 15:00	Report	Israel	11–20	Italy	Pieter van den Hoogenband Zwemstadion, Eindhoven; Referees: Diana Dutilh (NED), Ivo Mareš (CZE)
5 January 2024; 15:00	Report	Score by quarters: 2–6, 2–7, 2–4, 5–3			Pieter van den Hoogenband Zwemstadion, Eindhoven; Referees: Diana Dutilh (NED), Ivo Mareš (CZE)
5 January 2024; 15:00	Report	Yaacobi 4	Goals	Palmieri 4	Pieter van den Hoogenband Zwemstadion, Eindhoven; Referees: Diana Dutilh (NED), Ivo Mareš (CZE)

5 January 2024; 16:30	Report	Spain	17–8	France	Pieter van den Hoogenband Zwemstadion, Eindhoven; Referees: Radosław Koryzna (POL), Philip Uhlig (GER)
5 January 2024; 16:30	Report	Score by quarters: 4–1, 4–2, 4–3, 5–2			Pieter van den Hoogenband Zwemstadion, Eindhoven; Referees: Radosław Koryzna (POL), Philip Uhlig (GER)
5 January 2024; 16:30	Report	Crespí 3	Goals	Hertzka 3	Pieter van den Hoogenband Zwemstadion, Eindhoven; Referees: Radosław Koryzna (POL), Philip Uhlig (GER)

6 January 2024; 17:30	Report	Italy	12–6	France	Pieter van den Hoogenband Zwemstadion, Eindhoven; Referees: Maria Daskalopoulou (GRE), Nóra Debreceni (HUN)
6 January 2024; 17:30	Report	Score by quarters: 4–0, 2–3, 4–1, 2–2			Pieter van den Hoogenband Zwemstadion, Eindhoven; Referees: Maria Daskalopoulou (GRE), Nóra Debreceni (HUN)
6 January 2024; 17:30	Report	Bianconi 3	Goals	Bouloukbachi 3	Pieter van den Hoogenband Zwemstadion, Eindhoven; Referees: Maria Daskalopoulou (GRE), Nóra Debreceni (HUN)

6 January 2024; 20:30	Report	Spain	22–7	Israel	Pieter van den Hoogenband Zwemstadion, Eindhoven; Referees: Ivanka Raković Krstonošić (SRB), Sara Kontek (CRO)
6 January 2024; 20:30	Report	Score by quarters: 5–2, 5–3, 8–2, 4–0			Pieter van den Hoogenband Zwemstadion, Eindhoven; Referees: Ivanka Raković Krstonošić (SRB), Sara Kontek (CRO)
6 January 2024; 20:30	Report	Ortiz 5	Goals	Yaacobi 5	Pieter van den Hoogenband Zwemstadion, Eindhoven; Referees: Ivanka Raković Krstonošić (SRB), Sara Kontek (CRO)

7 January 2024; 15:30	Report	Israel	8–16	France	Pieter van den Hoogenband Zwemstadion, Eindhoven; Referees: Alessia Ferrari (ITA), Juan Carlos Colominas (ESP)
7 January 2024; 15:30	Report	Score by quarters: 3–4, 2–5, 1–3, 2–4			Pieter van den Hoogenband Zwemstadion, Eindhoven; Referees: Alessia Ferrari (ITA), Juan Carlos Colominas (ESP)
7 January 2024; 15:30	Report	Yaacobi 2	Goals	three players 3	Pieter van den Hoogenband Zwemstadion, Eindhoven; Referees: Alessia Ferrari (ITA), Juan Carlos Colominas (ESP)

7 January 2024; 17:00	Report	Spain	14–8	Italy	Pieter van den Hoogenband Zwemstadion, Eindhoven; Referees: Diana Dutilh (NED), Maria Daskalopoulou (GRE)
7 January 2024; 17:00	Report	Score by quarters: 5–1, 3–3, 3–2, 3–2			Pieter van den Hoogenband Zwemstadion, Eindhoven; Referees: Diana Dutilh (NED), Maria Daskalopoulou (GRE)
7 January 2024; 17:00	Report	Forca 5	Goals	Giustini 3	Pieter van den Hoogenband Zwemstadion, Eindhoven; Referees: Diana Dutilh (NED), Maria Daskalopoulou (GRE)

==== Group C ====
Pos	Team	Pld	W	PSW	PSL	L	GF	GA	GD	Pts	Qualification
1	Serbia	3	3	0	0	0	43	14	+29	9	Playoffs
2	Czech Republic	3	2	0	0	1	27	36	−9	6	Playoffs
3	Romania	3	1	0	0	2	25	35	−10	3	Classification round
4	Turkey	3	0	0	0	3	22	32	−10	0	Classification round

Source: LEN
Rules for classification: 1) points; 2) head-to-head points; 3) head-to-head goal difference; 4) head-to-head number of goals scored; 5) Goal difference.

5 January 2024; 09:00	Report	Romania	12–13	Czech Republic	Pieter van den Hoogenband Zwemstadion, Eindhoven; Referees: Martina Kuníková (SVK), Vyacheslav Byelyevtsov (UKR)
5 January 2024; 09:00	Report	Score by quarters: 1–1, 4–1, 3–6, 4–5			Pieter van den Hoogenband Zwemstadion, Eindhoven; Referees: Martina Kuníková (SVK), Vyacheslav Byelyevtsov (UKR)
5 January 2024; 09:00	Report	Olteanu 7	Goals	Holá 4	Pieter van den Hoogenband Zwemstadion, Eindhoven; Referees: Martina Kuníková (SVK), Vyacheslav Byelyevtsov (UKR)

5 January 2024; 10:30	Report	Serbia	13–6	Turkey	Pieter van den Hoogenband Zwemstadion, Eindhoven; Referees: Nóra Debreceni (HUN), Maxim Gerasimov (GBR)
5 January 2024; 10:30	Report	Score by quarters: 2–2, 2–1, 5–0, 4–3			Pieter van den Hoogenband Zwemstadion, Eindhoven; Referees: Nóra Debreceni (HUN), Maxim Gerasimov (GBR)
5 January 2024; 10:30	Report	Milićević 5	Goals	Buralı 2	Pieter van den Hoogenband Zwemstadion, Eindhoven; Referees: Nóra Debreceni (HUN), Maxim Gerasimov (GBR)

6 January 2024; 12:00	Report	Turkey	9–10	Czech Republic	Pieter van den Hoogenband Zwemstadion, Eindhoven; Referees: Juan Carlos Colominas (ESP), Aleksandar Nestorov (BUL)
6 January 2024; 12:00	Report	Score by quarters: 2–4, 2–3, 1–2, 4–1			Pieter van den Hoogenband Zwemstadion, Eindhoven; Referees: Juan Carlos Colominas (ESP), Aleksandar Nestorov (BUL)
6 January 2024; 12:00	Report	Kuş 5	Goals	Holá 3	Pieter van den Hoogenband Zwemstadion, Eindhoven; Referees: Juan Carlos Colominas (ESP), Aleksandar Nestorov (BUL)

6 January 2024; 13:30	Report	Romania	4–15	Serbia	Pieter van den Hoogenband Zwemstadion, Eindhoven; Referees: Diana Dutilh (NED), Anne Grandin (FRA)
6 January 2024; 13:30	Report	Score by quarters: 1–4, 1–4, 2–4, 0–3			Pieter van den Hoogenband Zwemstadion, Eindhoven; Referees: Diana Dutilh (NED), Anne Grandin (FRA)
6 January 2024; 13:30	Report	Melnychuk 3	Goals	Milićević 3	Pieter van den Hoogenband Zwemstadion, Eindhoven; Referees: Diana Dutilh (NED), Anne Grandin (FRA)

7 January 2024; 09:00	Report	Romania	9–7	Turkey	Pieter van den Hoogenband Zwemstadion, Eindhoven; Referees: Sara Kontek (CRO), Vyacheslav Byelyevtsov (UKR)
7 January 2024; 09:00	Report	Score by quarters: 4–2, 2–3, 3–2, 0–0			Pieter van den Hoogenband Zwemstadion, Eindhoven; Referees: Sara Kontek (CRO), Vyacheslav Byelyevtsov (UKR)
7 January 2024; 09:00	Report	Olteanu 4	Goals	Kuş 5	Pieter van den Hoogenband Zwemstadion, Eindhoven; Referees: Sara Kontek (CRO), Vyacheslav Byelyevtsov (UKR)

7 January 2024; 10:30	Report	Serbia	15–4	Czech Republic	Pieter van den Hoogenband Zwemstadion, Eindhoven; Referees: Anne Grandin (FRA), Ioana Feica-Prodan (ROU)
7 January 2024; 10:30	Report	Score by quarters: 3–1, 4–0, 4–1, 4–2			Pieter van den Hoogenband Zwemstadion, Eindhoven; Referees: Anne Grandin (FRA), Ioana Feica-Prodan (ROU)
7 January 2024; 10:30	Report	Milićević 4	Goals	Hlavatá 3	Pieter van den Hoogenband Zwemstadion, Eindhoven; Referees: Anne Grandin (FRA), Ioana Feica-Prodan (ROU)

==== Group D ====
Pos	Team	Pld	W	PSW	PSL	L	GF	GA	GD	Pts	Qualification
1	Great Britain	3	3	0	0	0	43	19	+24	9	Playoffs
2	Germany	3	2	0	0	1	47	31	+16	6	Playoffs
3	Slovakia	3	1	0	0	2	40	32	+8	3	Classification round
4	Bulgaria	3	0	0	0	3	23	71	−48	0	Classification round

Source: LEN
Rules for classification: 1) points; 2) head-to-head points; 3) head-to-head goal difference; 4) head-to-head number of goals scored; 5) Goal difference.

5 January 2024; 12:00	Report	Slovakia	7–12	Great Britain	Pieter van den Hoogenband Zwemstadion, Eindhoven; Referees: Sara Kontek (CRO), Matan Schwartz (ISR)
5 January 2024; 12:00	Report	Score by quarters: 1–5, 0–3, 3–2, 3–2			Pieter van den Hoogenband Zwemstadion, Eindhoven; Referees: Sara Kontek (CRO), Matan Schwartz (ISR)
5 January 2024; 12:00	Report	Mešterová 2	Goals	Rogers 3	Pieter van den Hoogenband Zwemstadion, Eindhoven; Referees: Sara Kontek (CRO), Matan Schwartz (ISR)

5 January 2024; 13:30	Report	Germany	29–9	Bulgaria	Pieter van den Hoogenband Zwemstadion, Eindhoven; Referees: Maria Daskalopoulou (GRE), İlkin Çakmakoğlu (TUR)
5 January 2024; 13:30	Report	Score by quarters: 10–2, 9–1, 5–3, 5–3			Pieter van den Hoogenband Zwemstadion, Eindhoven; Referees: Maria Daskalopoulou (GRE), İlkin Çakmakoğlu (TUR)
5 January 2024; 13:30	Report	Vosseberg 6	Goals	Gesheva 4	Pieter van den Hoogenband Zwemstadion, Eindhoven; Referees: Maria Daskalopoulou (GRE), İlkin Çakmakoğlu (TUR)

6 January 2024; 09:00	Report	Bulgaria	6–19	Great Britain	Pieter van den Hoogenband Zwemstadion, Eindhoven; Referees: Ioana Feica-Prodan (ROU), Vyacheslav Byelyevtsov (UKR)
6 January 2024; 09:00	Report	Score by quarters: 1–5, 1–6, 2–4, 2–4			Pieter van den Hoogenband Zwemstadion, Eindhoven; Referees: Ioana Feica-Prodan (ROU), Vyacheslav Byelyevtsov (UKR)
6 January 2024; 09:00	Report	Dimitrova 3	Goals	Falvey 5	Pieter van den Hoogenband Zwemstadion, Eindhoven; Referees: Ioana Feica-Prodan (ROU), Vyacheslav Byelyevtsov (UKR)

6 January 2024; 10:30	Report	Slovakia	10–12	Germany	Pieter van den Hoogenband Zwemstadion, Eindhoven; Referees: Alessia Ferrari (ITA), İlkin Çakmakoğlu (TUR)
6 January 2024; 10:30	Report	Score by quarters: 3–2, 4–4, 1–4, 2–2			Pieter van den Hoogenband Zwemstadion, Eindhoven; Referees: Alessia Ferrari (ITA), İlkin Çakmakoğlu (TUR)
6 January 2024; 10:30	Report	Sedlaková 4	Goals	Vosseberg 4	Pieter van den Hoogenband Zwemstadion, Eindhoven; Referees: Alessia Ferrari (ITA), İlkin Çakmakoğlu (TUR)

7 January 2024; 12:00	Report	Slovakia	23–8	Bulgaria	Pieter van den Hoogenband Zwemstadion, Eindhoven; Referees: Philip Uhlig (GER), Maxim Gerasimov (GBR)
7 January 2024; 12:00	Report	Score by quarters: 6–2, 4–2, 6–2, 7–2			Pieter van den Hoogenband Zwemstadion, Eindhoven; Referees: Philip Uhlig (GER), Maxim Gerasimov (GBR)
7 January 2024; 12:00	Report	Mešterová, Sedláková 5	Goals	four players 2	Pieter van den Hoogenband Zwemstadion, Eindhoven; Referees: Philip Uhlig (GER), Maxim Gerasimov (GBR)

7 January 2024; 13:30	Report	Germany	6–12	Great Britain	Pieter van den Hoogenband Zwemstadion, Eindhoven; Referees: Nóra Debreceni (HUN), Ivanka Raković Krstonošić (SRB)
7 January 2024; 13:30	Report	Score by quarters: 1–3, 0–3, 3–5, 2–1			Pieter van den Hoogenband Zwemstadion, Eindhoven; Referees: Nóra Debreceni (HUN), Ivanka Raković Krstonošić (SRB)
7 January 2024; 13:30	Report	Vosseberg 2	Goals	Falvey, Turner 4	Pieter van den Hoogenband Zwemstadion, Eindhoven; Referees: Nóra Debreceni (HUN), Ivanka Raković Krstonošić (SRB)

== Knockout stage ==
=== Bracket ===
Play-offs
8 January
Croatia	11
Serbia	8
8 January
France	14
Germany	6
8 January
Israel	9 (4)
Great Britain (PSO)	9 (5)
8 January
Hungary	27
Czech Republic	4

Quarter-finals
9 January
Spain	17
Croatia	6
9 January
Greece	15
France	7
9 January
Netherlands	25
Great Britain	6
9 January
Italy	12
Hungary	11

Semi-finals
11 January
Spain	13
Greece	5
11 January
Netherlands	7
Italy	6

Final
13 January
Spain	7
Netherlands	8
Third place
13 January
Greece	7
Italy	6

=== Playoffs ===
8 January 2024; 16:00	Report	Croatia	11–8	Serbia	Pieter van den Hoogenband Zwemstadion, Eindhoven; Referees: Diana Dutilh (NED), Nóra Debreceni (HUN)
8 January 2024; 16:00	Report	Score by quarters: 2–3, 2–3, 2–1, 5–1			Pieter van den Hoogenband Zwemstadion, Eindhoven; Referees: Diana Dutilh (NED), Nóra Debreceni (HUN)
8 January 2024; 16:00	Report	J. Butić 4	Goals	Milićević 4	Pieter van den Hoogenband Zwemstadion, Eindhoven; Referees: Diana Dutilh (NED), Nóra Debreceni (HUN)

8 January 2024; 17:30	Report	Israel	13–14 (PSO)	Great Britain	Pieter van den Hoogenband Zwemstadion, Eindhoven; Referees: Radosław Koryzna (POL), Philip Uhlig (GER)
8 January 2024; 17:30	Report	Score by quarters: 3–3, 2–2, 3–3, 1–1 PSO: 4–5			Pieter van den Hoogenband Zwemstadion, Eindhoven; Referees: Radosław Koryzna (POL), Philip Uhlig (GER)
8 January 2024; 17:30	Report	Kordonskaia, Sasover 2	Goals	Falvey 3	Pieter van den Hoogenband Zwemstadion, Eindhoven; Referees: Radosław Koryzna (POL), Philip Uhlig (GER)

8 January 2024; 19:00	Report	France	14–6	Germany	Pieter van den Hoogenband Zwemstadion, Eindhoven; Referees: Alessia Ferrari (ITA), Martina Kuníková (SVK)
8 January 2024; 19:00	Report	Score by quarters: 4–1, 5–2, 4–2, 1–1			Pieter van den Hoogenband Zwemstadion, Eindhoven; Referees: Alessia Ferrari (ITA), Martina Kuníková (SVK)
8 January 2024; 19:00	Report	Bouloukbachi 5	Goals	Rieck 3	Pieter van den Hoogenband Zwemstadion, Eindhoven; Referees: Alessia Ferrari (ITA), Martina Kuníková (SVK)

8 January 2024; 20:30	Report	Hungary	27–4	Czech Republic	Pieter van den Hoogenband Zwemstadion, Eindhoven; Referees: Anne Grandin (FRA), İlkin Çakmakoğlu (TUR)
8 January 2024; 20:30	Report	Score by quarters: 7–2, 6–2, 8–0, 6–0			Pieter van den Hoogenband Zwemstadion, Eindhoven; Referees: Anne Grandin (FRA), İlkin Çakmakoğlu (TUR)
8 January 2024; 20:30	Report	three players 4	Goals	Hlavatá 2	Pieter van den Hoogenband Zwemstadion, Eindhoven; Referees: Anne Grandin (FRA), İlkin Çakmakoğlu (TUR)

=== 13–16th place bracket ===
13–16th place semifinals
8 January
Slovakia	10
Turkey	13
8 January
Bulgaria	6
Romania	18

13th place
9 January
Turkey	7
Romania	3
15th place
9 January
Slovakia	18
Bulgaria	10

==== 13–16th place semifinals ====
8 January 2024; 12:00	Report	Slovakia	10–13	Turkey	Pieter van den Hoogenband Zwemstadion, Eindhoven; Referees: Maxim Gerasimov (GBR), Vyacheslav Byelyevtsov (UKR)
8 January 2024; 12:00	Report	Score by quarters: 5–2, 1–4, 2–3, 2–4			Pieter van den Hoogenband Zwemstadion, Eindhoven; Referees: Maxim Gerasimov (GBR), Vyacheslav Byelyevtsov (UKR)
8 January 2024; 12:00	Report	Mešterová 3	Goals	Kuş 6	Pieter van den Hoogenband Zwemstadion, Eindhoven; Referees: Maxim Gerasimov (GBR), Vyacheslav Byelyevtsov (UKR)

8 January 2024; 13:30	Report	Bulgaria	6–18	Romania	Pieter van den Hoogenband Zwemstadion, Eindhoven; Referees: Ivanka Raković Krstonošić (SRB), Ivo Mareš (CZE)
8 January 2024; 13:30	Report	Score by quarters: 1–6, 2–7, 2–3, 1–2			Pieter van den Hoogenband Zwemstadion, Eindhoven; Referees: Ivanka Raković Krstonošić (SRB), Ivo Mareš (CZE)
8 January 2024; 13:30	Report	Gesheva, Rumenova 2	Goals	Olteanu 7	Pieter van den Hoogenband Zwemstadion, Eindhoven; Referees: Ivanka Raković Krstonošić (SRB), Ivo Mareš (CZE)

==== 15th place game ====
9 January 2024; 09:00	Report	Slovakia	18–10	Bulgaria	Pieter van den Hoogenband Zwemstadion, Eindhoven; Referees: Ioana Feica-Prodan (ROU), Vyacheslav Byelyevtsov (UKR)
9 January 2024; 09:00	Report	Score by quarters: 5–3, 4–1, 5–3, 4–3			Pieter van den Hoogenband Zwemstadion, Eindhoven; Referees: Ioana Feica-Prodan (ROU), Vyacheslav Byelyevtsov (UKR)
9 January 2024; 09:00	Report	Kačková, Sedláková 4	Goals	Dimitrova 4	Pieter van den Hoogenband Zwemstadion, Eindhoven; Referees: Ioana Feica-Prodan (ROU), Vyacheslav Byelyevtsov (UKR)

==== 13th place game ====
9 January 2024; 10:30	Report	Turkey	7–3	Romania	Pieter van den Hoogenband Zwemstadion, Eindhoven; Referees: Anne Grandin (FRA), Ivo Mareš (CZE)
9 January 2024; 10:30	Report	Score by quarters: 1–0, 2–0, 2–0, 2–3			Pieter van den Hoogenband Zwemstadion, Eindhoven; Referees: Anne Grandin (FRA), Ivo Mareš (CZE)
9 January 2024; 10:30	Report	Kuş 3	Goals	Olteanu 2	Pieter van den Hoogenband Zwemstadion, Eindhoven; Referees: Anne Grandin (FRA), Ivo Mareš (CZE)

=== 9–12th place bracket ===
9–12th place semifinals
9 January
Serbia	12
Germany	11
9 January
Israel	18
Czech Republic	5

Ninth place
11 January
Serbia	12
Israel	13
Eleventh place
11 January
Germany	15
Czech Republic	12

==== 9–12th place semifinals ====
9 January 2024; 12:00	Report	Serbia	12–11	Germany	Pieter van den Hoogenband Zwemstadion, Eindhoven; Referees: Maria Daskalopoulou (GRE), İlkin Çakmakoğlu (TUR)
9 January 2024; 12:00	Report	Score by quarters: 5–1, 2–4, 3–5, 2–1			Pieter van den Hoogenband Zwemstadion, Eindhoven; Referees: Maria Daskalopoulou (GRE), İlkin Çakmakoğlu (TUR)
9 January 2024; 12:00	Report	five players 2	Goals	Plotz 4	Pieter van den Hoogenband Zwemstadion, Eindhoven; Referees: Maria Daskalopoulou (GRE), İlkin Çakmakoğlu (TUR)

9 January 2024; 13:30	Report	Israel	18–5	Czech Republic	Pieter van den Hoogenband Zwemstadion, Eindhoven; Referees: Maxim Gerasimov (GBR), Aleksandar Nestorov (BUL)
9 January 2024; 13:30	Report	Score by quarters: 3–3, 4–0, 4–1, 7–1			Pieter van den Hoogenband Zwemstadion, Eindhoven; Referees: Maxim Gerasimov (GBR), Aleksandar Nestorov (BUL)
9 January 2024; 13:30	Report	Bogachenko 7	Goals	Holá 2	Pieter van den Hoogenband Zwemstadion, Eindhoven; Referees: Maxim Gerasimov (GBR), Aleksandar Nestorov (BUL)

==== Eleventh place game ====
11 January 2024; 12:00	Report	Germany	15–12	Czech Republic	Pieter van den Hoogenband Zwemstadion, Eindhoven; Referees: Sara Kontek (CRO), Vyacheslav Byelyevtsov (UKR)
11 January 2024; 12:00	Report	Score by quarters: 3–4, 3–4, 3–3, 6–1			Pieter van den Hoogenband Zwemstadion, Eindhoven; Referees: Sara Kontek (CRO), Vyacheslav Byelyevtsov (UKR)
11 January 2024; 12:00	Report	G. Deike, Vosseberg 5	Goals	four players 2	Pieter van den Hoogenband Zwemstadion, Eindhoven; Referees: Sara Kontek (CRO), Vyacheslav Byelyevtsov (UKR)

==== Ninth place game ====
11 January 2024; 13:30	Report	Serbia	12–13	Israel	Pieter van den Hoogenband Zwemstadion, Eindhoven; Referees: Martina Kuníková (SVK), Anne Grandin (FRA)
11 January 2024; 13:30	Report	Score by quarters: 3–3, 4–1, 2–4, 3–5			Pieter van den Hoogenband Zwemstadion, Eindhoven; Referees: Martina Kuníková (SVK), Anne Grandin (FRA)
11 January 2024; 13:30	Report	five players 2	Goals	Bogachenko 4	Pieter van den Hoogenband Zwemstadion, Eindhoven; Referees: Martina Kuníková (SVK), Anne Grandin (FRA)

=== Quarterfinals ===
9 January 2024; 16:00	Report	Spain	17–6	Croatia	Pieter van den Hoogenband Zwemstadion, Eindhoven; Referees: Radosław Koryzna (POL), Philip Uhlig (GER)
9 January 2024; 16:00	Report	Score by quarters: 5–2, 4–3, 3–0, 5–1			Pieter van den Hoogenband Zwemstadion, Eindhoven; Referees: Radosław Koryzna (POL), Philip Uhlig (GER)
9 January 2024; 16:00	Report	Camus, Peña 4	Goals	Rozić 2	Pieter van den Hoogenband Zwemstadion, Eindhoven; Referees: Radosław Koryzna (POL), Philip Uhlig (GER)

9 January 2024; 17:30	Report	Netherlands	25–6	Great Britain	Pieter van den Hoogenband Zwemstadion, Eindhoven; Referees: Ivanka Raković Krstonošić (SRB), Sara Kontek (CRO)
9 January 2024; 17:30	Report	Score by quarters: 7–1, 8–2, 3–1, 7–2			Pieter van den Hoogenband Zwemstadion, Eindhoven; Referees: Ivanka Raković Krstonošić (SRB), Sara Kontek (CRO)
9 January 2024; 17:30	Report	Rogge 5	Goals	Perkins, Turner 2	Pieter van den Hoogenband Zwemstadion, Eindhoven; Referees: Ivanka Raković Krstonošić (SRB), Sara Kontek (CRO)

9 January 2024; 19:00	Report	Greece	15–7	France	Pieter van den Hoogenband Zwemstadion, Eindhoven; Referees: Diana Dutilh (NED), Martina Kuníková (SVK)
9 January 2024; 19:00	Report	Score by quarters: 3–1, 3–4, 4–1, 5–1			Pieter van den Hoogenband Zwemstadion, Eindhoven; Referees: Diana Dutilh (NED), Martina Kuníková (SVK)
9 January 2024; 19:00	Report	Ninou 4	Goals	Daulé 2	Pieter van den Hoogenband Zwemstadion, Eindhoven; Referees: Diana Dutilh (NED), Martina Kuníková (SVK)

9 January 2024; 20:30	Report	Italy	12–11	Hungary	Pieter van den Hoogenband Zwemstadion, Eindhoven; Referees: Juan Carlos Colominas (ESP), Matan Schwartz (ISR)
9 January 2024; 20:30	Report	Score by quarters: 4–2, 3–3, 4–4, 1–2			Pieter van den Hoogenband Zwemstadion, Eindhoven; Referees: Juan Carlos Colominas (ESP), Matan Schwartz (ISR)
9 January 2024; 20:30	Report	Bianconi 4	Goals	Garda 4	Pieter van den Hoogenband Zwemstadion, Eindhoven; Referees: Juan Carlos Colominas (ESP), Matan Schwartz (ISR)

=== 5–8th place bracket ===
5–8th place semifinals
11 January
Croatia	10
France	12
11 January
Great Britain	5
Hungary	21

Fifth place
13 January
France	3
Hungary	14
Seventh place
13 January
Croatia	9
Great Britain	11

==== 5–8th place semifinals ====
11 January 2024; 16:00	Report	Croatia	10–12	France	Pieter van den Hoogenband Zwemstadion, Eindhoven; Referees: Alessia Ferrari (ITA), Juan Carlos Colominas (ESP)
11 January 2024; 16:00	Report	Score by quarters: 3–3, 2–3, 2–4, 3–2			Pieter van den Hoogenband Zwemstadion, Eindhoven; Referees: Alessia Ferrari (ITA), Juan Carlos Colominas (ESP)
11 January 2024; 16:00	Report	J. Butić 4	Goals	Hertzka, Vernoux 3	Pieter van den Hoogenband Zwemstadion, Eindhoven; Referees: Alessia Ferrari (ITA), Juan Carlos Colominas (ESP)

11 January 2024; 17:30	Report	Great Britain	5–21	Hungary	Pieter van den Hoogenband Zwemstadion, Eindhoven; Referees: Diana Dutilh (NED), Ivo Mareš (CZE)
11 January 2024; 17:30	Report	Score by quarters: 1–7, 1–4, 1–4, 2–6			Pieter van den Hoogenband Zwemstadion, Eindhoven; Referees: Diana Dutilh (NED), Ivo Mareš (CZE)
11 January 2024; 17:30	Report	Rogers 2	Goals	Keszthelyi 5	Pieter van den Hoogenband Zwemstadion, Eindhoven; Referees: Diana Dutilh (NED), Ivo Mareš (CZE)

==== Seventh place game ====
13 January 2024; 16:00	Report	Croatia	9–11	Great Britain	Pieter van den Hoogenband Zwemstadion, Eindhoven; Referees: Alessia Ferrari (ITA), Maria Daskalopoulou (GRE)
13 January 2024; 16:00	Report	Score by quarters: 2–1, 2–1, 4–5, 1–4			Pieter van den Hoogenband Zwemstadion, Eindhoven; Referees: Alessia Ferrari (ITA), Maria Daskalopoulou (GRE)
13 January 2024; 16:00	Report	J. Butić 3	Goals	Turner 4	Pieter van den Hoogenband Zwemstadion, Eindhoven; Referees: Alessia Ferrari (ITA), Maria Daskalopoulou (GRE)

==== Fifth place game ====
13 January 2024; 17:30	Report	France	3–14	Hungary	Pieter van den Hoogenband Zwemstadion, Eindhoven; Referees: Ivanka Raković Krstonošić (SRB), Radosław Koryzna (POL)
13 January 2024; 17:30	Report	Score by quarters: 1–5, 0–4, 0–2, 2–3			Pieter van den Hoogenband Zwemstadion, Eindhoven; Referees: Ivanka Raković Krstonošić (SRB), Radosław Koryzna (POL)
13 January 2024; 17:30	Report	three players 1	Goals	Keszthelyi 6	Pieter van den Hoogenband Zwemstadion, Eindhoven; Referees: Ivanka Raković Krstonošić (SRB), Radosław Koryzna (POL)

=== Semifinals ===
11 January 2024; 19:00	Report	Spain	13–5	Greece	Pieter van den Hoogenband Zwemstadion, Eindhoven; Referees: Matan Schwartz (ISR), Nóra Debreceni (HUN)
11 January 2024; 19:00	Report	Score by quarters: 4–1, 1–1, 4–1, 4–2			Pieter van den Hoogenband Zwemstadion, Eindhoven; Referees: Matan Schwartz (ISR), Nóra Debreceni (HUN)
11 January 2024; 19:00	Report	Forca 3	Goals	Xenaki 3	Pieter van den Hoogenband Zwemstadion, Eindhoven; Referees: Matan Schwartz (ISR), Nóra Debreceni (HUN)

11 January 2024; 20:30	Report	Netherlands	7–6	Italy	Pieter van den Hoogenband Zwemstadion, Eindhoven; Referees: Radosław Koryzna (POL), Philip Uhlig (GER)
11 January 2024; 20:30	Report	Score by quarters: 1–1, 2–2, 2–2, 2–1			Pieter van den Hoogenband Zwemstadion, Eindhoven; Referees: Radosław Koryzna (POL), Philip Uhlig (GER)
11 January 2024; 20:30	Report	three players 2	Goals	six players 1	Pieter van den Hoogenband Zwemstadion, Eindhoven; Referees: Radosław Koryzna (POL), Philip Uhlig (GER)

=== Third place game ===
13 January 2024; 19:00	Report	Greece	7–6	Italy	Pieter van den Hoogenband Zwemstadion, Eindhoven; Referees: Diana Dutilh (NED), Juan Carlos Colominas (ESP)
13 January 2024; 19:00	Report	Score by quarters: 3–1, 1–0, 1–1, 2–4			Pieter van den Hoogenband Zwemstadion, Eindhoven; Referees: Diana Dutilh (NED), Juan Carlos Colominas (ESP)
13 January 2024; 19:00	Report	Asimaki 2	Goals	Bianconi 2	Pieter van den Hoogenband Zwemstadion, Eindhoven; Referees: Diana Dutilh (NED), Juan Carlos Colominas (ESP)

=== Final ===
13 January 2024; 20:30	Report	Spain	7–8	Netherlands	Pieter van den Hoogenband Zwemstadion, Eindhoven; Referees: Nóra Debreceni (HUN), Matan Schwartz (ISR)
13 January 2024; 20:30	Report	Score by quarters: 2–1, 1–4, 2–1, 2–2			Pieter van den Hoogenband Zwemstadion, Eindhoven; Referees: Nóra Debreceni (HUN), Matan Schwartz (ISR)
13 January 2024; 20:30	Report	Ortiz 2	Goals	Joustra, Van der Sloot 2	Pieter van den Hoogenband Zwemstadion, Eindhoven; Referees: Nóra Debreceni (HUN), Matan Schwartz (ISR)

== Final standings ==
Greece qualified for the 2024 Summer Olympics as the highest ranked team not yet qualified for the event. Greece, France and Great Britain secured the three remaining European tickets to the 2024 World Aquatics Championships.

Rank	Team
1st place, gold medalist(s)	Netherlands
2nd place, silver medalist(s)	Spain
3rd place, bronze medalist(s)	Greece
4	Italy
5	Hungary
6	France
7	Great Britain
8	Croatia
9	Israel
10	Serbia
11	Germany
12	Czech Republic
13	Turkey
14	Romania
15	Slovakia
16	Bulgaria

Qualified for the 2024 Summer Olympics and the 2024 World Aquatics Championships
Qualified for the 2024 World Aquatics Championships

2024 Women's European Water Polo Championship

Netherlands
Sixth title

== Awards and statistics ==
=== Top goalscorers ===
Rank	Name	Goals	Shots	%
1	(Hungary) Rita Keszthelyi	21	44	48
1	(Romania) Alina-Ioana Olteanu	21	48	44
1	(Germany) Belen Vosseberg	21	37	57
4	(Turkey) Kübra Kuş	20	46	43
4	(Serbia) Ana Milićević	20	39	51
6	(Israel) Maria Bogachenko	16	35	46
6	(United Kingdom) Toula Falvey	16	28	57
6	(Hungary) Krisztina Garda	16	27	59
6	(Slovakia) Monika Sedlaková	16	28	57
10	(Croatia) Jelena Butić	15	50	30

=== Awards ===
The awards were announced on 13 January 2024.

Position	Player
Best goalkeeper	(Netherlands) Laura Aarts
Most Valuable Player	(Spain) Beatriz Ortiz
