= 2015–16 LEN Euro League Women =

Women's water polo season

The 2015–16 LEN Women's Champions' Cup was the 29th edition of LEN's premier competition for women's water polo clubs.

== Final four ==
=== Squads ===
The final four squads were Kinef Kirishi, Olympiacos, CN Sabadell and UVSE Budapest.

=== Kinef Kirishi ===
No.	Name	Date of birth	Position
1	Kseniia Balai	4 February 1994	
2	Olga Beliaeva	18 March 1985	
3	Kristina Domnicheva	12 February 1996	
4	Nadezhda Glyzina	20 May 1988	
5	Ekaterina Iakusheva	26 March 1997	
6	Alina Inogamova	14 October 1999	
7	Polina Iushkova	5 July 1996	Goalkeeper
8	Evgeniya Ivanova	26 July 1987	
9	Anna Karnaukh	31 August 1993	Goalkeeper
10	Bella Khamzaeva	15 May 1998	
11	Anastasiia Khokhlova	27 November 1992	
12	Ekaterina Kirilcheva	17 May 1992	
13	Kseniia Krimer	19 July 1992	
14	Viktoriia Kurochkina	5 August 1992	
15	Veronika Lapina	27 July 1999	
16	Daria Lukina	2 April 1999	
17	Ekaterina Prokofyeva	13 March 1991	
18	Daria Ryzhkova	8 February 1995	
19	Anastasia Simanovich	23 January 1995	
20	Evgeniia Soboleva	26 August 1988	
21	Natalia Sokolova	30 July 1987	
22	Mariia Trushchenkova	31 July 1997	

=== Olympiacos ===
No.	Name	Date of birth	Position
1	Alexandra Asimaki	28 June 1988	
2	Alkisti Avramidou	26 February 1988	
3	Roberta Bianconi	8 July 1989	
4	Chrysoula Diamantopoulou	22 September 1995	Goalkeeper
5	Adamantia Doureka	26 September 1998	
6	Monika Eggens	25 December 1990	
7	Nikoleta Eleftheriadou	17 January 1998	
8	Giulia Enrica Emmolo	16 October 1991	
9	Vasiliki Logotheti	4 October 1998	
10	Triantafyllia Manolioudaki	19 March 1986	
11	Virginia Niarchakou	5 December 1996	
12	Eleftheria Plevritou	23 April 1997	
13	Margarita Plevritou	17 November 1994	
14	Vasiliki Plevritou	8 June 1998	
15	Maria Sora	10 June 1996	
16	Ioanna Stamatopoulou	17 June 1998	Goalkeeper
17	Evdokia Tetzalidou	21 February 1990	

=== CN Sabadell ===
No.	Name	Date of birth	Position
1	Anna Espar	8 January 1993	
2	Lidia Casado	30 January 1998	
3	Clara Espar	29 September 1994	
4	Laura Ester	22 January 1990	Goalkeeper
5	Judith Forca	7 June 1996	
6	Maica Garcia	17 October 1990	
7	Jennifer Pareja	8 May 1984	
8	Maria Del Pilar Pena	4 April 1986	
9	Elena Sanchez	20 October 1994	Goalkeeper
10	Marina Cordobes	28 April 1997	
11	Matilde Ortiz	19 September 1990	
12	Colleen Maire O'Donnell	30 July 1992	
13	Olga Domenech	21 September 1988	

=== UVSE Budapest ===
No.	Name	Date of birth	Position
1	Emilia Adam	29 July 1998	
2	Dora Antal	9 September 1993	
3	Reka Aranyi	13 October 1999	Goalkeeper
4	Barbara Bartus	26 August 1999	
5	Reka Bicskei	28 July 1997	
6	Dora Csabai	20 April 1989	
7	Szonja Drajko	24 July 1999	
8	Edina Gangl	25 June 1990	Goalkeeper
9	Matilda Gerendas	18 October 1997	
10	Dorottya Gyarfas	3 June 1999	
11	Orsolya Hertzka	31 October 1998	
12	Dora Hidas	4 August 1999	
13	Rita Keszthelyi	10 December 1991	
14	Eszter Kiss	5 October 1999	
15	Hanna Kisteleki	10 March 1991	
16	Krisztina Koncsag	4 May 1998	
17	Vivien Kovesdi	1 August 1994	
18	Szonja Kuna	9 October 1997	
19	Anna Mucsy	19 February 1998	
20	Monika Pap	7 July 2001	
21	Gabriella Szűcs	7 March 1988	
22	Vivien Takacs	5 September 1992	
23	Ildiko Toth	23 April 1987	
24	Vivien Vogt	11 March 1998	
