= 2021 Women's LEN Super Cup =

Water polo match

2021 LEN Women's Super Cup
Tournament details
- Arena: Piraeus , Greece
- Dates: 17 December 2021

Final positions
- Champions: (Greece) Olympiacos Piraeus
- Runners-up: (Russia) Kinef Kirishi

The 2021 Women's LEN Super Cup was the 15th edition of the annual trophy organised by LEN and contested by the reigning champions of the two European competitions for Women's water polo clubs. The match was an all-Greek derby between European champions Olympiacos Piraeus of Greece (winners of the 2020–21 LEN Euro League Women) and Kinef Kirishi of Russia (winners of the 2020–21 Women's LEN Trophy). The match was held in Piraeus, Greece, on 17 December 2021.

Olympiacos Piraeus won its second Super Cup, beating Kinef Kirishi 14–11.

== Teams ==
Team	Qualification	Previous participation (bold indicates winners)
(Greece) Olympiacos Piraeus	Winners of the 2020–21 LEN Euro League Women	2014, **2015**,
(Russia) Kinef Kirishi	Winners of the 2020–21 Women's LEN Trophy	**2017**, 2018

== Final ==
17 December 2021; 16:30	**Olympiacos Piraeus** (Greece)	**14**–11	(Russia) Kinef Kirishi	Athens, Greece; Referees: Wengenroth (SUI), Varkonyi (HUN)
17 December 2021; 16:30	Score by quarters: 3–**4**, **6**–2, 3–3, 2–2			Athens, Greece; Referees: Wengenroth (SUI), Varkonyi (HUN)
17 December 2021; 16:30	Raney 4	**Goals**	Zubkova 5	Athens, Greece; Referees: Wengenroth (SUI), Varkonyi (HUN)

== See also ==
- 2021–22 LEN Champions League
- 2021–22 LEN Euro Cup
- 2021–22 LEN Euro League Women
- 2021–22 Women's LEN Trophy
- 2021 LEN Super Cup
