= Ethnikos Piraeus =

Greek multisport club based in Piraeus

- Full name: Ethnikos Omilos Filathlon Pireos/Phalirou
- Founded: 21 November 1923; 102 years ago
- Colours: Blue, White
- Chairman: Ioannis Patlakas
- Club titles: European Titles: 2
- Website: Club home page

Ethnikos Piraeus (Greek: Εθνικός Πειραιώς) is a Greek multisport club based in Piraeus. It was founded in 1923. The full name of the club is Ethnikos Omilos Filathlon Pireos/Phalirou or Ethnikos OFPF (Greek: Εθνικός Όμιλος Φιλάθλων Πειραιώς-Φαλήρου/Εθνικός ΟΦΠΦ), which means National Club of Fans of Piraeus and Phalerum. Ethnikos has sections in football, basketball, volleyball, waterpolo, swimming. In most of these sports, Ethnikos has won titles and honours. The most successful department is by far the water polo department, which has won many domestic and European titles. Nevertheless, the most popular is the football team, which had a remarkable tradition in the first division in the past.

== Departments ==
- Ethnikos Piraeus F.C., the football team is playing in Gamma Ethniki, third tier (2023–24).
- Ethnikos Piraeus B.C., the basketball team is playing in Beta Ethniki, third tier (2023–24).
- Ethnikos Piraeus V.C., the women's volleyball team is playing in Beta Ethniki, fourth tier (2023–24)
- Ethnikos Piraeus W.P.C., the water polo team is playing in A1 Ethniki both men and women, first tier (2023–24)
- Ethnikos Piraeus Swimming team, 10 times Greek men's championship team

== History ==
=== Early years ===
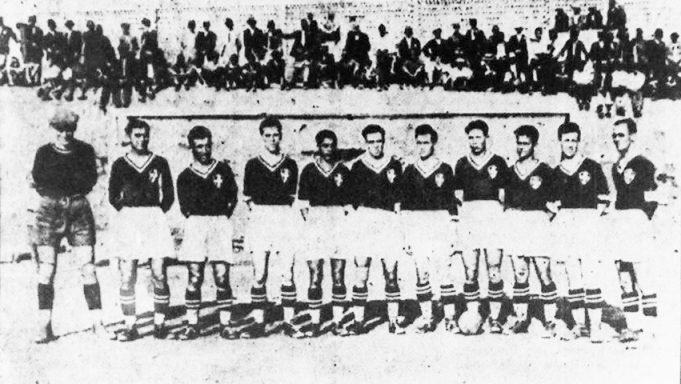
Ethnikos winner's cup team in 1933

Ethnikos was founded in 1923 under the name Keravnos. One year later the club was renamed to Young Boys Titan. On 23 December 1924, Young Boys Titan merged with the club Peiraikos Podosfairikos Omilos and renamed to Ethnikos. During the early years Ethnikos enjoyed successes by the teams of football, waterpolo and swimming. Ethnikos swimming team won two Panhellenic championships in 1926 and 1927. Ethnikos water polo team won the first championship organised by SEGAS in 1926 and another one in 1931. Ethnikos football team won the second football cup of the Greek football in 1933. The football team also was the runner-up in the first Panhellenic Championship, in 1928. Ethnikos claimed the championship two more times. The first time was in 1929, when it won the championship of Piraeus and qualified for the Panhellenic championship but this wasn't held. The second time was in 1935, when Ethnikos was the winner of championship of South Greece and qualified for the final of Panhellenic Championship, but eventually the final wasn't held.

=== The first postwar years ===
After Second World War Ethnikos created a strong team both football and waterpolo. The water polo team won its third national championship in 1948 which was the last before the upcoming dynasty. The football team was runner-up of 1955-56 Greek championship having finished one only point behind the head of the standings, Olympiacos. The next season Ethnikos, along with Olympiacos and Panathinaikos were the heavy favorites for the title but Ethnikos was denied the title because of a strict punishment by EPO. The reason of punishment was the conduct of football games with the exiled football team of Hungary. Ethnikos was two points behind (one win) of the second placed team in the last four remaining fixtures, with the upcoming match being the Piraeus derby with Olympiacos. Ethnikos water polo team dominated entirely in Water Polo Championship, taking all the titles between 1950 and 1990 except for 1950, 1951, 1952, 1971, 1986, 1987, 1989, 1990 . Ethnikos won 18 consecutive championships from 1953 to 1970 and 14 consecutive championships from 1972 to 1985. Moreover, the club was unbeaten for 13 years between 1951 and 1964, a record that the team holds till now. Ethnikos also holds the record for the most unbeaten championships with 29. The team was the first Greek one to reach the final-4 of LEN's Champions League, the elite club competition in Europe, in 1980 when the Greeks faced Jug, Vasas and Spandau.

=== Last years ===
The fall of football team of Ethnikos started in the early of 1990's. In 1989–90 season Ethnikos was relegated to Beta Ethniki (second division) for first time, after 35 consecutive appearances Alpha Ethniki (first division). The football team of Ethnikos owed a big part of success in the longtime President Dimitris Karellas. After his death in 1993, the football team of Ethnikos didn't manage to return to successes in contrast to its water polo team that continued to give successes to Ethnikos. The men's team won the domestic championship in 1994, the domestic cup in 2000 beating on both occasions bitter rivals Olympiacos, reached the semifinals of the 2002–03 LEN Euro Cup, won again the domestic cup in 2005 and the domestic championship in 2006 beating again Olympiacos in the finals. Ethnikos women's water polo team, won the LEN Women's Euro Cup in 2010 and 2022, the only european cups of Ethnikos. In 2011 Ethnikos created a field hockey team. Ethnikos Piraeus field hockey has won two championships so far in 2012 and 2014. Overall, Ethnikos football team has two official second-place finishes in Greek championship (1928, 1956), one unofficial second place in 1935 when the final was not held and a very close attempt of winning the championship in 1957. The men's water polo team has 38 Greek championships, 12 Greek cups and 11 Central Greece Championships, in contrast to its women's team that has 3 championships and 2 LEN Women's Euro Cups. The football team has 49 appearances in the top division while the water polo team has only two absences in 2010 and 2013 due to relegation.

== Sport facilities ==
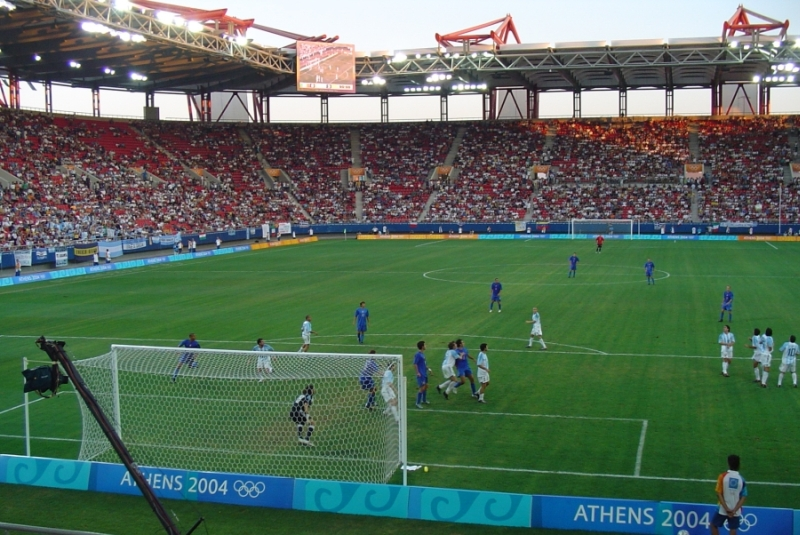
Karaiskakis Stadium in 2004

The first years Ethnikos was playing in Neo Phaliron Velodrome. In the place of velodrome, the Karaiskakis Stadium was built in 1960 and became the new home of Ethnikos. Ethnikos had been playing in Karaiskaki until 2004, when the stadium renovated. The next years Ethnikos played in different stadiums. It played in Hellinikon Stadium as well as many other ones all over Attica. The water polo team plays in national natatorium of Piraeus, known also as “Petros Kapageroff” formerly Papastrateio. The basketball and volleyball team play in Panagiotis Salpeas gymnasium in the centre of Piraeus.

== Rivalries ==
=== Piraeus Derby ===
Ethnikos's traditional rival is Olympiacos. Ethnikos was founded earlier than Olympiacos and these two clubs are the biggest in Piraeus. Ethnikos is believed that it represents the upper and middle class of Piraeus whereas Olympiacos is believed that it represents the working class. Olympiacos was suggested as a name for Ethnikos but the founding members rejected it and Notis Kamperos, Olympiacos founder used it for his team. Karaiskakis Stadium today's home of Olympiacos has been the traditional home of Ethnikos but since the demolition of the old stadium, Ethnikos has not been able to use the new Karaiskakis Stadium because of the large operating expenses that Olympiacos is demanding. This has led to Ethnikos using other stadiums as a home ground. Ethnikos's home ground issue is one of the biggest in Greek football in the last 22 years and authorities claim that a new stadium could be built for Ethnikos but not in the N. Faliro - Kastella area of Piraeus where the heart of Ethnikos is, but on the outskirts of Piraeus. This has affected the fanbase of the team and has resulted in a decrease of fans in Piraeus.

== Honours ==
=== Summary ===
Ethnikos is the fifth most successful Greek club in terms of total titles won in domestic and European team sports competitions. In addition, Ethnikos is the fourth most successful Greek club in men's team sports competitions.

Ethnikos Piraeus F.C.

- Greek Football Championship
  - Runners-up (3): 1928, 1935^{*}, 1956
- Greek Cup
  - Winner (1): 1933
- 5 Piraeus EPS cups

Ethnikos Piraeus Water Polo Club

- Greek Championship
  - Winner (38) (record): 1926, 1931, 1948, 1953, 1954, 1955, 1956, 1957, 1958, 1959, 1960, 1961, 1962, 1963, 1964, 1965, 1966, 1967, 1968, 1969, 1970, 1972, 1973, 1974, 1975, 1976, 1977, 1978, 1979, 1980, 1981, 1982, 1983, 1984, 1985, 1988, 1994, 2006
- Greek Cup
  - Winner (12): 1953, 1954, 1955, 1956, 1957, 1958, 1984, 1985, 1988, 1991, 2000, 2005.

Ethnikos Piraeus Water Polo Club (women)

- LEN Women's Euro Cup
  - Winner (2): 2010, 2022
- Greek Championship
  - Winner (3): 1988, 1990, 1992
- Greek Cup
  - Winner (1): 2024

Ethnikos Field Hockey Club

- Greek Field Hockey Championship
  - Winner (2): 2012, 2014

Ethnikos Swimming team

- Panhellenic Championships (4): 1926, 1927, 1930, 1949
- Panhellenic Championships (Men's table) (10): 1926, 1927, 1930, 1948, 1949, 1950, 1951, 1982, 1983, 2010

== European Honours ==
season	men's water polo	women's water polo
1980	LEN Champions League 4th	
2002–03	LEN Euro Cup 3rd	
2009–10		LEN Trophy Winners
2010–11		LEN Super Cup Final
2021–22		LEN Trophy Winners

== Notable supporters ==
- Giannis Mantzouranis, club's superfan
- Dimitris Karellas, entrepreneur, former Ethnikos president
- Alexandros Karydopoulos, ship owner, former Ethnikos president
- Alexis Angelopoulos, ship owner, former Ethnikos president
- Giorgos Patiniotis, footballer, former Ethnikos player
- Vasilis Patiniotis, footballer, former Ethnikos player
- Ilias Armodoros, footballer, former Ethnikos player
- Nondas Samartzidis, water polo player and swimmer, former Ethnikos athlete
- Nikos Stellatos, water polo player, former Ethnikos athlete
- Dimitris Stathakopoulos, international affairs lecturer, former water polo athlete
- Lefteris Lazarou, one of the most influential Greek chefs, Michelin Guide Star awarded chef
- Vasilis Vasilikos, writer and diplomat
