= 2020–21 LEN Euro League Women knockout stage =

This article describes the knockout stage of the 2020–21 LEN Euro League Women.

The 2020–21 Euro League Women knockout phase began on 27 February with the playoffs and ended on 1 May 2021 with the final. Olympiacos won the title.

== Qualified teams ==
The knockout phase involves the sixteen teams which qualified as winners and runners-up of each of the eight groups in the qualification round.

Group	Winners	Runners-up
A	(Hungary) UVSE Hunguest Hotel	(Russia) Dynamo Uralochka
B	(Russia) Kinef-Surgutneftegas	(Spain) CN Mataró
C	(Italy) Lifebrain SIS Roma	(Greece) Olympiacos
D	(Spain) Astrapool Sabadell	(Hungary) Dunaújváros

== Quarterfinals ==
The draw for the eight-finals was held on 7 February 2021. The first legs were played on 27 February, and the second legs were played on 13 March 2021.

=== Overview ===
Team 1	Agg.	Team 2	1st leg	2nd leg
Kinef-Surgutneftegas (Russia)	23–24	(Russia) Dynamo Uralochka	8–11	10–7 (5–6 p)
Astrapool Sabadell (Spain)	19–22	(Greece) Olympiacos	14–12	5–10
CN Mataró (Spain)	18–21	(Hungary) UVSE Hunguest Hotel	9–12	9–9
Lifebrain SIS Roma (Italy)	17–21	(Hungary) Dunaújváros	11–11	6–10

=== Matches ===
27 February 2021; 17:00 (15:00 MSK)	Report	Kinef-Surgutneftegas (Russia)	8–11	(Russia) Dynamo Uralochka	Kirishi; Referees: Stanojević (SRB), Ðurašković (MNE)
27 February 2021; 17:00 (15:00 MSK)	Report	Score by quarters: 2–5, 1–2, 2–3, 3–1			Kirishi; Referees: Stanojević (SRB), Ðurašković (MNE)
27 February 2021; 17:00 (15:00 MSK)	Report	Markoch, Ivanova 2	Goals	Bersneva 4	Kirishi; Referees: Stanojević (SRB), Ðurašković (MNE)

12 March 2021; 19:30 (15:30 YEKT)	Report	Dynamo Uralochka (Russia)	13–15	(Russia) Kinef-Surgutneftegas	Zlatoust; Referees: Raković (SRB), Golikov (RUS)
12 March 2021; 19:30 (15:30 YEKT)	Report	Score by quarters: 1–3, 2–1, 3–2, 1–4 PSO: 6–5			Zlatoust; Referees: Raković (SRB), Golikov (RUS)
12 March 2021; 19:30 (15:30 YEKT)	Report	Panfilova 5	Goals	Simanovich, Ivanova	Zlatoust; Referees: Raković (SRB), Golikov (RUS)

18–18 on aggregate. Dynamo Uralochka won 6–5 on penalties.

27 February 2021; 11:45	Report	Astrapool Sabadell (Spain)	14–12	(Greece) Olympiacos	Piscina Can Llong, Sabadell; Referees: Debreceni (HUN), Bouchez (FRA)
27 February 2021; 11:45	Report	Score by quarters: 3–3, 3–3, 4–4, 4–2			Piscina Can Llong, Sabadell; Referees: Debreceni (HUN), Bouchez (FRA)
27 February 2021; 11:45	Report	Forca 5	Goals	Plevritou 3	Piscina Can Llong, Sabadell; Referees: Debreceni (HUN), Bouchez (FRA)

12 March 2021; 13:00 (14:00 EET)	Report	Olympiacos (Greece)	10–5	(Spain) Astrapool Sabadell	Papastrateio Hall, Piraeus; Referees: Várkonyi (HUN), Nicolosi (ITA)
12 March 2021; 13:00 (14:00 EET)	Report	Score by quarters: 1–1, 2–1, 3–2, 4–1			Papastrateio Hall, Piraeus; Referees: Várkonyi (HUN), Nicolosi (ITA)
12 March 2021; 13:00 (14:00 EET)	Report	Eleftheriadou 3	Goals	five players 1	Papastrateio Hall, Piraeus; Referees: Várkonyi (HUN), Nicolosi (ITA)

Olympiacos won 22–19 on aggregate.

27 February 2021; 19:00	Report	CN Mataró (Spain)	9–12	(Hungary) UVSE Hunguest Hotel	Mataró; Referees: Moiralis (GRE), Haentschel (GER)
27 February 2021; 19:00	Report	Score by quarters: 2–2, 1–2, 3–3, 3–5			Mataró; Referees: Moiralis (GRE), Haentschel (GER)
27 February 2021; 19:00	Report	three players 2	Goals	Keszthelyi 3	Mataró; Referees: Moiralis (GRE), Haentschel (GER)

12 March 2021; 19:30	Report	UVSE Hunguest Hotel (Hungary)	9–9	(Spain) CN Mataró	Budapest; Referees: Wengenroth (GER), Markopoulou (GRE)
12 March 2021; 19:30	Report	Score by quarters: 3–3, 1–0, 2–1, 3–5			Budapest; Referees: Wengenroth (GER), Markopoulou (GRE)
12 March 2021; 19:30	Report	Antal 4	Goals	Lloret 3	Budapest; Referees: Wengenroth (GER), Markopoulou (GRE)

UVSE Hunguest Hotel won 21–18 on aggregate.

27 February 2021; 18:30	Report	Lifebrain SIS Roma (Italy)	11–11	(Hungary) Dunaújváros	Rome; Referees: Castrilli (SUI), Jaumandreu (ESP)
27 February 2021; 18:30	Report	Score by quarters: 4–3, 2–3, 4–3, 1–2			Rome; Referees: Castrilli (SUI), Jaumandreu (ESP)
27 February 2021; 18:30	Report	four players 2	Goals	Szilágyi 6	Rome; Referees: Castrilli (SUI), Jaumandreu (ESP)

12 March 2021; 17:30	Report	Dunaújváros (Hungary)	10–6	(Italy) Lifebrain SIS Roma	Budapest; Referees: Štampalija (CRO), Oretga (ESP)
12 March 2021; 17:30	Report	Score by quarters: 3–1, 2–2, 3–0, 2–3			Budapest; Referees: Štampalija (CRO), Oretga (ESP)
12 March 2021; 17:30	Report	Garda 3	Goals	Galardi, Giustini 2	Budapest; Referees: Štampalija (CRO), Oretga (ESP)

Dunaújváros won 21–17 on aggregate.

== Final four ==
The draw took place on 23 March 2021. The final four will held at the Danube Arena in Budapest, Hungary on 30 April and 1 May 2021.

=== Bracket ===
Semifinals
30 April
(Greece) Olympiacos	9
(Hungary) UVSE Hunguest Hotel	8
30 April
(Hungary) Dunaújváros	15
(Russia) Dynamo Uralochka	14

Final
1 May
(Greece) Olympiacos	7
(Hungary) Dunaújváros	6
Third place
1 May
(Hungary) UVSE Hunguest Hotel	15
(Russia) Dynamo Uralochka	10
