= Greek Women's Water Polo Super Cup =

Polo club competition in Greece

- Sport: Water Polo
- Founded: 2020
- No. of teams: 2
- Country: Greece
- Most recent champion: Olympiacos Piraeus (2025)
- Most titles: Olympiacos Piraeus (3)

The Greek Women's Water Polo Super Cup is a Water Polo club competition in Greece founded in 2020. It is an annual match between the Greek A1 Ethniki Women Champion and the Cup Winner of the same year. The matches take place in different locations. Olympiacos has the most Super Cups.

== The matches ==
Year	Winner	Score	Finalist	Location	Source
2020	Olympiacos Piraeus	30 - 4	Nireas Chalandriou	Piraeus	
2024	Olympiacos Piraeus	13 - 8	Ethnikos Piraeus	Piraeus	
2025	Olympiacos Piraeus	14 - 11	Vouliagmeni	Piraeus	

== Performance by club ==
Club	Winners	Runners-up	Years won	Years Runners-up
Olympiacos Piraeus	3	-	2020, 2024, 2025	-
Nireas Chalandriou	-	1	-	2020
Ethnikos Piraeus	-	1	-	2024
Vouliagmeni	-	1	-	2025
