= Vasileia Mavrelou =

Greek water polo player

Vaso Mavrelou
Personal information
- Nationality: Greek
- Born: February 23, 1985 (age 41) Chios, Greece

Sport
- Sport: Water polo
- Club: AEK
Medal record
Women's water polo
Representing Greece
FINA Water Polo World League
Gold medal – first place	2005 Kirishi	Team competition
Bronze medal – third place	2010 San Diego	Team competition

Vasileia "Vaso" Mavrelou (Greek: Βάσω Μαυρέλου; born February 23, 1985) is a female Greek water polo player who was a member of the Greece women's national water polo team that won the gold medal at the 2005 FINA Women's Water Polo World League in Kirishi and the bronze medal at the 2010 World League in San Diego. She also competed in the 2006 European Water Polo Championship, where Greece finished in the 6th place.

At club level, she played for Olympiacos for 11 years (2002–2013), winning 2 Greek Championships and numerous European honours (2007–08 LEN Trophy runners-up, 2010–11 LEN Champions Cup third place among many others). She currently plays for Rethymno NC (2015–16 season).
