= 2021 LEN Super Cup =

Water polo match

Tournament details
- Arena: Szolnok , Hungary
- Dates: 20 December 2021

Final positions
- Champions: (Italy) Pro Recco
- Runners-up: (Hungary) Szolnok

The 2021 LEN Super Cup was the 39th edition of the annual trophy organised by LEN and contested by the reigning champions of the two European competitions for men's water polo clubs. The match was played between European champions Pro Recco of Italy (winners of the 2020–21 LEN Champions League) and Szolnok of Hungary (winners of the 2021–22 LEN Euro Cup). The match was held in Szolnok, Hungary, on 20 December 2021.

Pro Recco won the Super Cup, beating Szolnok 15–4. The Italian side won its record seventh Super Cup in total.

== Teams ==
Team	Qualification	Previous participation (bold indicates winners)
(Italy) Pro Recco	Winners of the 2020–21 LEN Champions League	1984, **2003**, **2007**, **2008**, **2010**, **2012**, **2015**
(Hungary) Szolnok	Winners of the 2020–21 LEN Euro Cup	**2017**

== Final ==
20 December 2021; 18:00	**Pro Recco** (Italy)	**15**–4	(Hungary) Szolnok	Szolnok, Hungary; Referees: Margeta (SLO), Zwart (NED)
20 December 2021; 18:00	Score by quarters: **3**–1, **5**–2, **2**–0, **5**–1			Szolnok, Hungary; Referees: Margeta (SLO), Zwart (NED)
20 December 2021; 18:00	Di Fulvio 4	**Goals**	Sanahuja, Averka 2	Szolnok, Hungary; Referees: Margeta (SLO), Zwart (NED)

== See also ==
- 2021–22 LEN Champions League
- 2021–22 LEN Euro Cup
- 2021–22 LEN Euro League Women
- 2021–22 Women's LEN Trophy
- 2021 Women's LEN Super Cup
