= 2019 Women's LEN Super Cup =

Water polo match

Sabadell	Orizzonte
(Spain)	(Italy)
11	13
- Date: 26 November 2019
- Venue: Centre Can Llong, Sabadell
- Attendance: 1000

The 2019 Women's LEN Super Cup was the 14th edition of the annual trophy organised by LEN and contested by the reigning champions of the two European competitions for women's water polo clubs. The match was played between CN Sabadell (2018–19 Euro League champions) and Orizzonte Catania (winners of the 2018–19 LEN Trophy) at the Centre Can Llong in Sabadell, Spain, on 26 November 2019.

Italy's Orizzonte Catania upset Spain's home-team Sabadell and won its second Super Cup, eleven years after its first success in the competition.

== Teams ==
Team	Qualification	Previous participation (bold indicates winners)
(Spain) CN Sabadell	Winners of the 2018–19 LEN Euro League Women	2011, **2013**, **2014**, **2016**
(Italy) Orizzonte Catania	Winners of the 2018–19 Women's LEN Trophy	2006, **2008**

=== Squads ===
Sabadell
№	**Nat.**	**Player**	**Birth Date**	**Position**
1	(Spain)	Laura Ester	22 January 1990	Goalkeeper
2	(Spain)	Matilde Ortiz	16 September 1990	Field Player
3	(Canada)	Gurpreet Kaur Sohi	20 July 1994	Field Player
4	(Spain)	Ruth Ariño	31 August 2001	Field Player
5	(Spain)	Silvia Morell	18 April 2000	Field Player
6	(Spain)	Nona Pérez	10 April 2003	Field Player
7	(Spain)	Marina Cordobés	28 April 1997	Field Player
8	(Spain)	Maica García	17 October 1990	Field Player
9	(Spain)	Judith Forca	7 June 1996	Field Player
10	(Canada)	Monika Eggens	25 December 1990	Field Player
11	(Russia)	Ekaterina Tankeeva	28 June 1989	Field Player
12	(Italy)	Laura Barzon	14 May 1992	Field Player
13	(Spain)	Ainara Farré	21 March 1999	Goalkeeper

Head coach: David Palma Lopera

Orizzonte
№	**Nat.**	**Player**	**Birth Date**	**Position**
1	(Italy)	Giulia Gorlero	26 June 1990	Goalkeeper
2	(Italy)	Carolina Ioannou	26 March 1996	Field Player
3	(Italy)	Arianna Garibotti	9 December 1989	Field Player
4	(Italy)	Giulia Viacava	1 September 1994	Field Player
5	(Italy)	Rosaria Aiello	12 May 1989	Field Player
6	(Canada)	Joëlle Békhazi	27 April 1987	Field Player
7	(Italy)	Valeria Palmieri	18 October 1993	Field Player
8	(Italy)	Claudia Marletta	23 November 1995	Field Player
9	(Italy)	Giulia Emmolo	16 October 1991	Field Player
10	(Canada)	Hayley McKelvey	11 March 1996	Field Player
11	(Italy)	Isabella Riccioli	17 October 2000	Field Player
12	(Italy)	Roberta Santapaola	11 November 2000	Field Player
13	(Italy)	Giuseppina Condorelli	26 September 1990	Goalkeeper

Head coach: Martina Miceli

== Match ==
26 November 2019; 19:30 (UTC+01:00)	Report	(Spain) CN Sabadell	11–13	Orizzonte Catania (Italy)	Centre Can Llong, Sabadell; Attendance: 1000; Referees: Gabriella Várkonyi (HUN), Diana Dulith-Dumas (NED)
26 November 2019; 19:30 (UTC+01:00)	Report	Score by quarters: 1–3, 1–6, 6–2, 3–2			Centre Can Llong, Sabadell; Attendance: 1000; Referees: Gabriella Várkonyi (HUN), Diana Dulith-Dumas (NED)
26 November 2019; 19:30 (UTC+01:00)	Report	3: Eggens; 2: García, Forca; 1: Ortiz, Sohi, Ariño, Cordobés	Goals	5: Garibotti; 2: Palmieri, Marletta; 1: Viacava, Aiello, Emmolo, McKelvey	Centre Can Llong, Sabadell; Attendance: 1000; Referees: Gabriella Várkonyi (HUN), Diana Dulith-Dumas (NED)

== See also ==
- 2019 LEN Super Cup
