= 2020–21 Women's LEN Trophy =

European water polo tournament

- League: Women's LEN Trophy
- Sport: Water Polo
- Duration: 17 – 18 April 2021
- Number of teams: 4 (from 3 countries)
- Finals champions: (Russia) Kinef Kirishi
- Runners-up: (Spain) CN Mataró

Women's LEN Trophy seasons
- ← 2019–20 2021–22 →

The 2020–21 Women's LEN Trophy is the 21st edition of the European second-tier tournament for women's water polo clubs. It was a Final Four that was played in Barcelona, Spain, on the 17 and 18 April 2021. Kinef Kirishi of Russia won its first LEN Trophy, beating CN Mataró of Spain 10–8 in the Final.

== Teams ==
The participants were the four teams eliminated from the Euro League's quarterfinals.

Team 1	Agg.	Team 2	1st leg	2nd leg
Kinef-Surgutneftegas (Russia)	23–24	(Russia) Dynamo Uralochka	8–11	10–7 (5–6 p)
Astrapool Sabadell (Spain)	19–22	(Greece) Olympiacos	14–12	5–10
CN Mataró (Spain)	18–21	(Hungary) UVSE Hunguest Hotel	9–12	9–9
Lifebrain SIS Roma (Italy)	17–21	(Hungary) Dunaújváros	11–11	6–10

Final 4
(Russia) Kinef Kirishi
(Spain) Astrapool Sabadell
(Spain) CN Mataró
(Italy) Lifebrain SIS Roma

== Final Four ==
The referees for the Final Four were: Varkony (HUN), Markopoulou (GRE), Schwartz (ISR), Ohme (GER).

=== Bracket ===
Semi finals
30 April
(Spain) CN Mataró	9
(Italy) Lifebrain SIS Roma	6
30 April
(Russia) Kinef Kirishi	18
(Spain) Astrapool Sabadell	12

Final
1 May
(Spain) CN Mataró	8
(Russia) Kinef Kirishi	10
Third place
1 May
(Italy) Lifebrain SIS Roma	5
(Spain) Astrapool Sabadell	11

=== Semi finals ===
17 April 2021; 10:30	CN Mataró (Spain)	9–6	(Italy) Lifebrain SIS Roma	Barcelona, Spain
17 April 2021; 10:30	Score by quarters: 1–1, 2–1, 3–2, 3–2			Barcelona, Spain
17 April 2021; 10:30	Espar 6	Goals	Picozzi 2	Barcelona, Spain

17 April 2021; 13:00	Kinef Kirishi (Russia)	18–12	(Spain) Astrapool Sabadell	Barcelona, Spain
17 April 2021; 13:00	Score by quarters: 4–2, 4–3, 5–3, 5–4			Barcelona, Spain
17 April 2021; 13:00	Keuning 6	Goals	three players 3	Barcelona, Spain

=== Third place match ===
18 April 2021; 10:15	Lifebrain SIS Roma (Italy)	5–11	(Spain) Astrapool Sabadell	Barcelona, Spain
18 April 2021; 10:15	Score by quarters: 1–2, 1–3, 1–2, 2–4			Barcelona, Spain
18 April 2021; 10:15	Avegno 3	Goals	Cordobes, Keuning 3	Barcelona, Spain

=== Final ===
18 April 2021; 13:00	CN Mataró (Spain)	8–10	(Russia) Kinef Kirishi	Barcelona, Spain
18 April 2021; 13:00	Score by quarters: 0–1, 4–2, 3–2, 3–3			Barcelona, Spain
18 April 2021; 13:00	Espar 4	Goals	Prokofyeva 3	Barcelona, Spain

== See also ==
- 2020–21 LEN Euro League Women
