= Olympiacos women's water polo team =

Greek water polo team

Olympiacos
- Nickname: Thrylos (The Legend); Gorgones (The Mermaids); Erythrolefkes (The Red-Whites)
- Founded: 1988
- League: A1 Ethniki Water Polo; LEN Euroleague
- Based in: Piraeus, Greece
- Arena: Papastrateio Pool Piraeus
- Colors: Red, White
- President: (Greece) Michalis Kountouris
- Head coach: (Greece) Giorgos Doskas
- Championships: 4 Champions Leagues; 4 Super Cup; 1 Euro Cup; 3 Quadruple Crowns; 1 Continental Treble; 16 Greek Championships; 7 Greek Cups; 3 Greek Super Cup
- Website: olympiacossfp.gr

Olympiacos Women's Water Polo Club is the women's water polo department of the major Greek multi-sport club Olympiacos, based in Piraeus. The department was founded in 1988 and they play their games at the 1000-seated Papastrateio "Petros Kapagerof" Pool in Piraeus.

== European trophies and successes ==
Olympiacos is one of the most successful clubs in European water polo, having won 4 Champions Leagues in 2015, 2021, 2022 and 2026, 4 Super Cups in 2015, 2021, 2022, 2026 and 1 Euro Cup in 2014 and having overall a commanding presence in European competitions. Besides the 4 Champions League, 4 European Super Cups and 1 Euro Cup titles, they were runners-up of the Champions League in 2017, 2019 and 2024, runners-up of the LEN Super Cup in 2014, runners-up of the LEN Euro Cup in 2008 and 2018 and they have participated, altogether, in 12 Champions' League Final Fours (1996, 2010, 2011, 2015, 2016, 2017, 2019, 2021, 2022, 2024, 2025, 2026), as well as in 5 LEN Euro Cup Final Fours (2001, 2007, 2008, 2014, 2018), being semi-finalists of the same competition in 2009 and 2012.

In 2014 Olympiacos won the LEN Euro Cup in the Final Four in Florence, beating home team Firenze Waterpolo 10–9 in the final. One year later, Olympiacos were crowned European Champions, winning the LEN Champions League in the 2015 Final Four in Piraeus, after a 10–9 win in the final against the then-reigning champions Sabadell, who were undefeated for more than 3 years with 115 consecutive wins in all competitions. Olympiacos lifted the LEN Champions League title undefeated and having won 8 straight matches without even a single draw. Subsequently, Olympiacos won the 2015 LEN Super Cup as well, defeating Plebiscito Padova, thus completing a continental Treble in 2015 (LEN Champions League, LEN Super Cup, Greek Championship), winning season's all three available titles.

In 2021 Olympiacos won their second LEN Champions League title in Budapest, beating home teams UVSE (9–8 in the semi-final) and Dunaújvárosi (7–6 in the final) with a roster composed entirely of Greek players. They went on to win the Greek League and the Greek Cup, thus completing the first ever Triple Crown for a Greek club in the sport's history, which eventually became a Quadruple Crown after winning the 2021 LEN Super Cup.

In 2022 Olympiacos were crowned back-to-back European Champions in Piraeus, beating UVSE (18–11 in the semi-final) and Sabadell (11–7 in the final). They went on to win the Greek League, the Greek Cup and the 2022 LEN Super Cup, thus completing the second (back-to-back) Quadruple Crown in their history.

After the 2015 LEN Euroleague win of Olympiacos women's water polo team, Olympiacos SFP became the only multi-sport club in European water polo history after Pro Recco to have been crowned European Champions with both its men's and women's departments, and the only club with both its departments currently active (Pro Recco Women's department has been dissolved since 2012).

Domestically, Olympiacos is the most successful Greek club, having won a record 16 Greek Championships, a record 6 Greek Cups, a record 3 Greek Super Cups and a record 5 Doubles. They also hold the all-time record for the most consecutive Greek Championships, as they are the only team to have won 11 consecutive Greek Championship titles (2014–2024). They won their first two titles in 1995 and 1998, but their best performance in the league came after coach Charis Pavlidis' arrival in 2007. Beginning from season 2010–11, Olympiacos has won eleven Greek Championships in thirteen seasons (2011, 2014–2023). In the 2015–16, 2019–20, 2020–21, 2021–22 and 2022–23 seasons, Olympiacos won the Greek Championship undefeated, winning every game in both the regular season and the play-offs. They won the first-ever Greek Cup which was held in 2017–18 season and the first-ever Greek Super Cup held in 2020.

== History ==
Some of the greatest players in the world (many of them Olympic medalists and World Champions) have played for Olympiacos over the years including: Iefke van Belkum, Alexandra Asimaki, Yasemin Smit, Lauren Wenger, Ashleigh Southern, Bronwen Knox, Roberta Bianconi, Giulia Emmolo, Kami Craig, Jordan Raney, Triantafyllia Manolioudaki, Alkisti Avramidou, Eleftheria Plevritou, Margarita Plevritou, Chrysi Diamantopoulou, Vaso Plevritou, Nikoleta Eleftheriadou, Stavroula Antonakou, Ilektra Psouni, Angeliki Karapataki, Antonia Moraiti, Evi Moraitidou, Anthoula Mylonaki, Dimitra Asilian, Eftychia Karagianni, Maria Kanellopoulou, Christina Tsoukala, Eleni Xenaki, Ioanna Stamatopoulou, Kyra Christmas, Brigitte Sleeking, Kyriaki Liosi, Patricia del Soto, Blanca Gil, Barbara Bujka, Ágnes Valkai, Vaso Mavrelou, Maria Balomenaki, Ann Dow, Camila Pedrosa, Sun Yating, Eszter Tomaskovics, Maria Tsouri and Assel Jakayeva.

== Roster ==
2026–2027
Squad as of October 2026

Number	Nationality	Player	Height	Date of Birth
Goalkeepers (3)
1	(Greece)	Ioanna Stamatopoulou	1.84	17/06/1998
13	(Italy) - (Greece)	Divina Nigro	1.77	13/11/1997
13	(Greece)	Eftychia Konstantopoulou	1.80	13/04/2006
Defense (4)
7	(Greece)	Christina Siouti	1.80	01/09/2004
8	(Greece)	Maria Patra	1.77	17/10/1998
11	(Greece)	Sofia Tornarou	1.78	23/07/2004
16	(Greece)	Despoina Drakotou	1.75	09/05/2007
Offense (2)
3	(Greece)	Denia Koureta	1.79	18/09/2005
12	(Greece)	Maria Myriokefalitaki	1.84	08/01/2001
Midfield (9)
2	(Greece)	Elena Elliniadi	1.70	02/04/1999
4	(Greece)	Stefania Santa	1.78	06/09/2004
5	(Greece)	Foteini Tricha	1.74	26/04/2005
6	(Australia)	Abby Andrews	1.79	28/11/2000
9	(Greece)	Eirini Ninou	1.70	20/09/2002
10	(Greece)	Vaso Plevritou (C)	1.79	08/06/1998
14	(Hungary)	Kata Haidu	1,82	27/3/2006
15	(Greece)	Anastasia-Maria Bikou	1.74	25/08/2008
18 (2)	(Greece)	Rafaela Saltamanica	1.83	05/01/2009
Head Coach
	(Greece)	Giorgos Doskas

=== Staff ===
Name	Job
(Greece) Giorgos Fountoulis	Assistant Coach
(Greece) Giorgos Grigoris Karachalios	Doctor
(Greece) Panagiotis Adamopoulos	Physioterapist
(Greece) Filio Manolioudaki	General Manager
(Greece) Alexandra Kalogera (Greece) Konstantinos Gouras	Team Official
(Greece) Vangelis Lakkos	Trainer
(Greece) Giorgos Roumanis	Analyst

== Honours ==
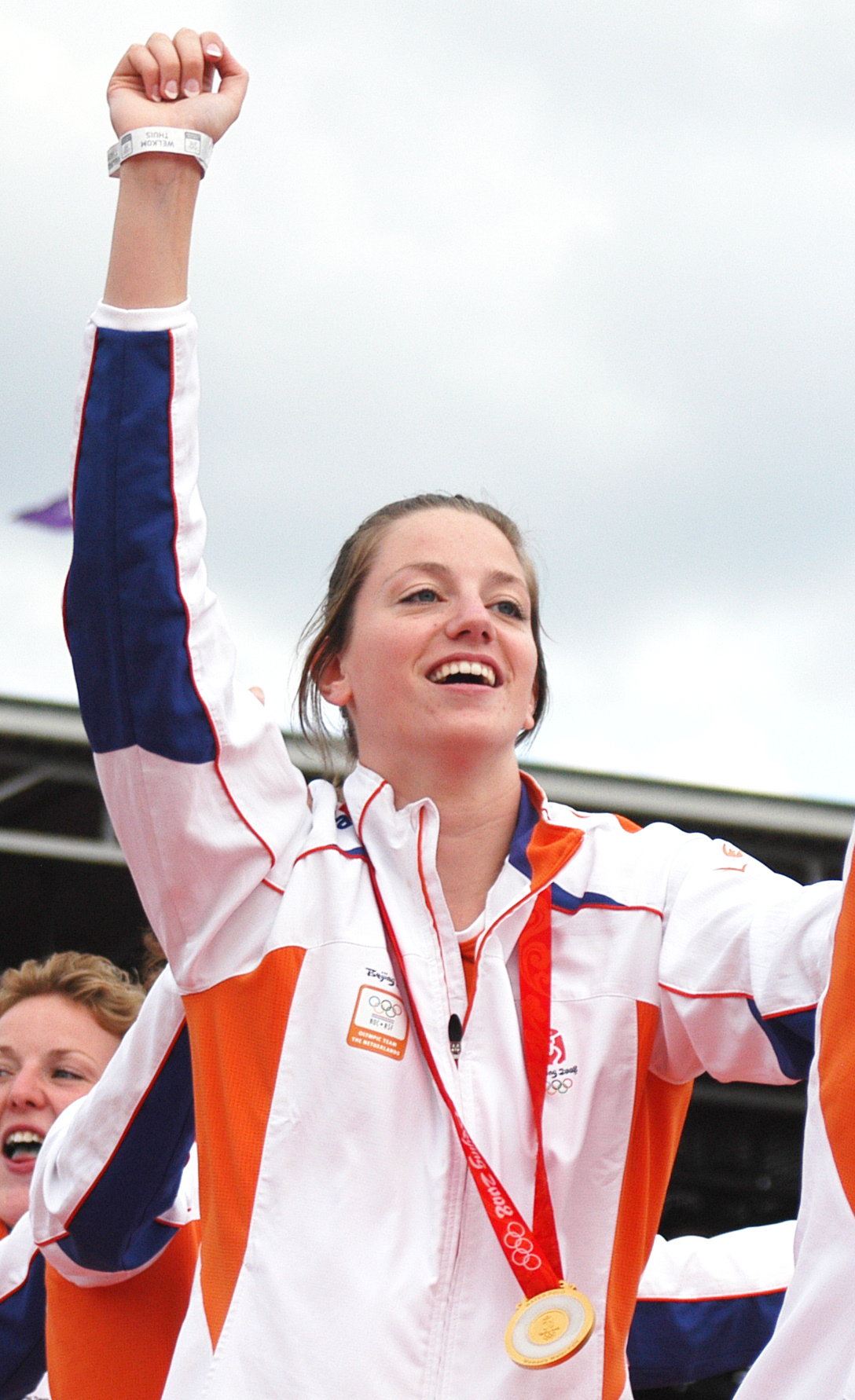
Iefke van Belkum

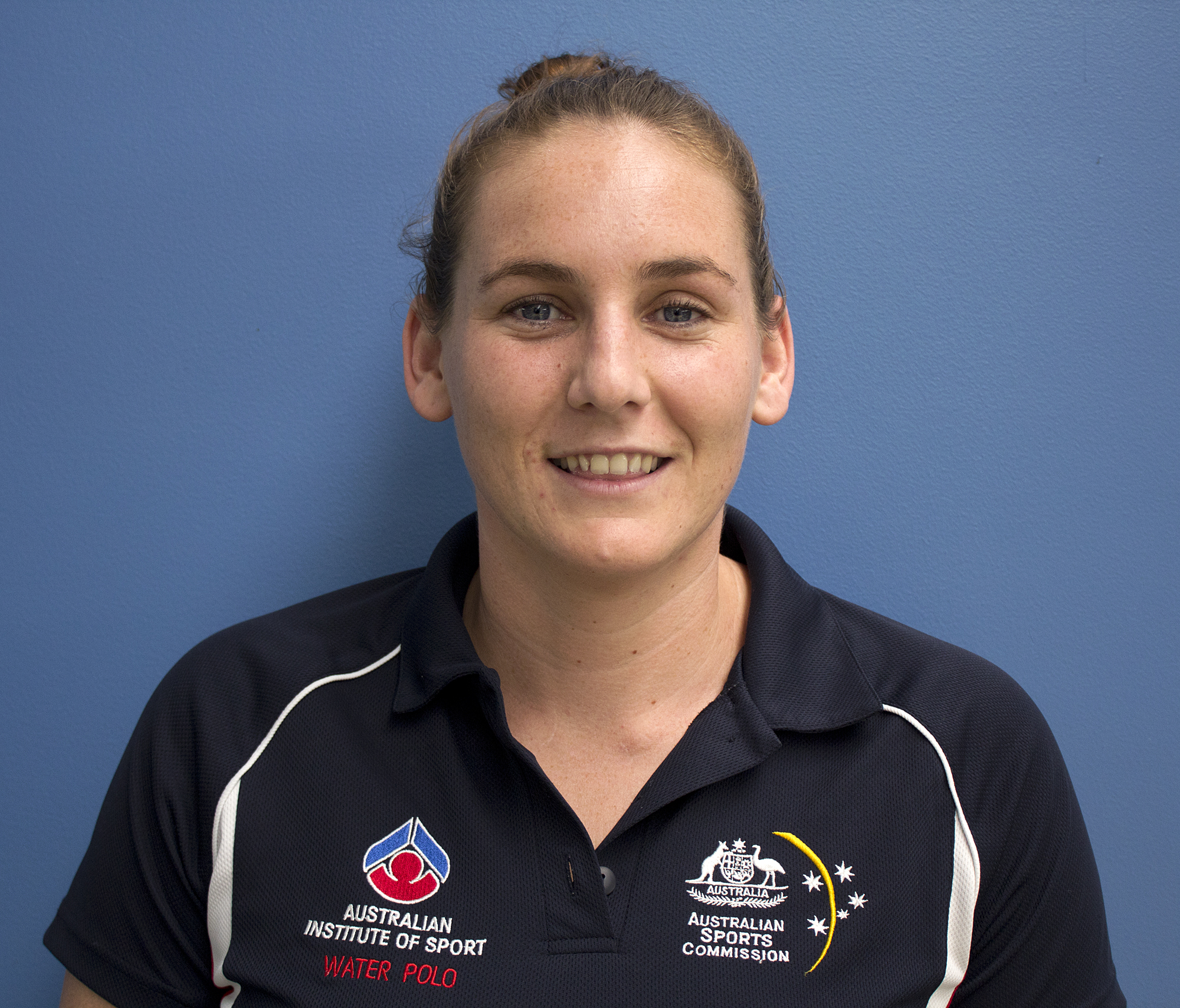
Bronwen Knox scored Olympiacos' winning goal in the 2014 LEN Trophy final against Firenze (10–9)

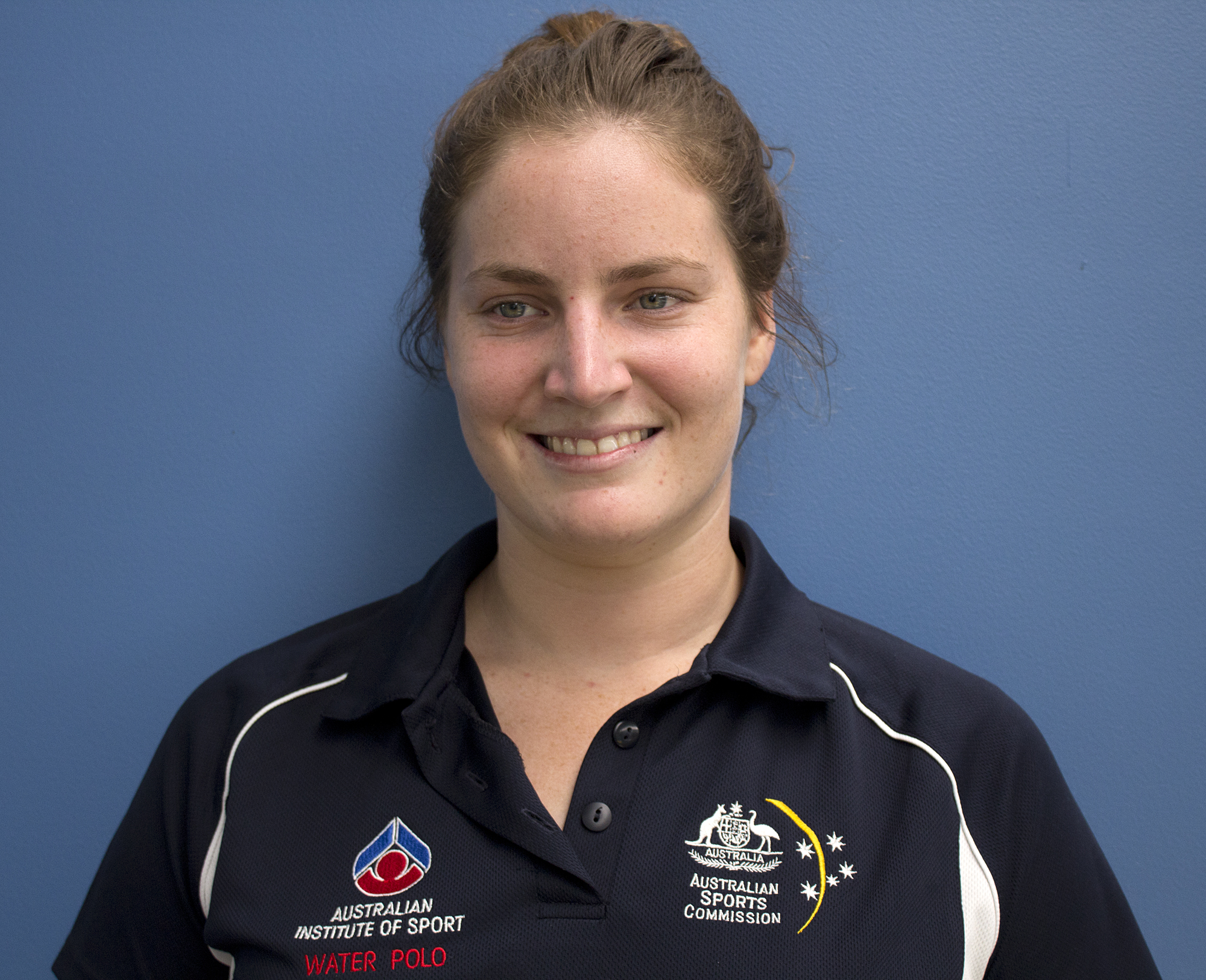
Ashleigh Southern scored 4 goals in Olympiacos' 10–9 win against Sabadell in the final of the 2014–15 Euro League

=== Domestic competitions ===
- Greek League
  - Winners (16) (record): 1994–95, 1997–98, 2008–09, 2010–11, 2013–14, 2014–15, 2015–16, 2016–17, 2017–18, 2018–19, 2019–20, 2020–21, 2021–22, 2022–23, 2023–24, 2025–26
- Greek Cup
  - Winners (7) (record): 2017–18, 2019–20, 2020–21, 2021–22, 2022–23, 2024–25, 2025–26
- Greek Super Cup
  - Winners (3) (record): 2020, 2024, 2025

=== European competitions ===
- European Aquatics Champions League
  - Winners (4): 2014–15, 2020–21, 2021–22, 2025–26
  - Runners-up (3): 2016–17, 2018–19, 2023–24
  - 3rd place (2): 2010–11, 2024–25
  - 4th place (3): 1995–96, 2009–10, 2015–16
  - Final Four (12): 1996, 2010, 2011, 2015, 2016, 2017, 2019, 2021, 2022, 2024, 2025, 2026
- European Super Cup
  - Winners (4): 2015, 2021, 2022, 2026
  - Runners-up (1): 2014
- European Aquatics Euro Cup
  - Winners (1): 2013–14
  - Runners-up (2): 2007–08, 2017–18
  - Semi-finals (2): 2008–09, 2011–12
  - 4th place (2): 2000–01, 2006–07

=== Individual club awards ===
- Quadruple Crown
  - Winners (2): 2020–21 (LEN Euro League, LEN Super Cup, Greek League, Greek Cup), 2021–22 (LEN Euro League, LEN Super Cup, Greek League, Greek Cup)
- Continental Treble
  - Winners (1): 2014–15 (LEN Euro League, LEN Super Cup, Greek League)
- Double
  - Winners (6) (record): 2017–18, 2019–20, 2020–21, 2021–22, 2022–23 (Greek League, Greek Cup) ,2025-2026

== International record ==
Season	Achievement	Notes
LEN Champions' Cup / LEN Euro League
1995–96	Final 8	4th place
2009–10	Final Four	4th place. Defeated 11–12 by Kinef Kirishi in the semi-final and 12–13 by Orizzonte Catania in the 3rd place game
2010–11	Final Four	3rd place. Defeated 13–14 by Orizzonte Catania in the semi-final, won 14–12 against Kinef Kirishi in the 3rd place game
2014–15	European Champions	won 10–8 against Kinef Kirishi in the semi-final and 10–9 against Sabadell in the final in Piraeus
2015–16	Final Four	4th place. Defeated 11–12 by UVSE in the semi-final and 9–10 by Kinef Kirishi in the 3rd place game
2016–17	Final	won 11–9 against Sabadell in the semi-final, defeated by Kinef Kirishi 6–7 in the final in Kirishi
2018–19	Final	won 8–7 against Vouliagmeni in the semi-final, defeated by Astralpool Sabadell 11–13 in the final in Sabadell
2020–21	European Champions	won 9–8 against UVSE Hunguest Hotels in the semi-final and 7–6 against Dunaújváros in the final in Budapest
2021–22	European Champions	won 18–11 against UVSE Hunguest Hotels in the semi-final and 11–7 against Astralpool Sabadell in the final in Piraeus
LEN Trophy
2000–01	Final Four	4th place
2006–07	Final Four	4th place. Defeated by Roma 4–7, by ZWV Nereus 6–7 and tied 7–7 against ΟSC Budapest
2007–08	Final	won ΟSC Budapest 13–12 in the semi-final, defeated by Roma 9–10 in the final
2008–09	Semi-finals	eliminated by Dunaújváros, drew 5–5 in Dunaújváros, lost 10–13 in Athens
2011–12	Semi-finals	eliminated by WC Yugra, won 9–8 in Athens, lost 8–11 in Khanty-Mansiysk
2013–14	Winners	won 13–12 against Kinef Kirishi in the semi-final and 10–9 against Firenze in the final in Florence
2017–18	Final	won 10–4 against Plebiscito Padova in the semi-final, defeated by Dunaújváros 11–13 in the final in Mataró
LEN Super Cup
2014	Final	lost 8–9 to Sabadell in Barcelona
2015	SuperCup Champions	won 10–6 against Plebiscito Padova in Piraeus
2021	SuperCup Champions	won 14–11 against Kinef Kirishi in Piraeus
2022	SuperCup Champions	won 11–4 against Ethnikos Piraeus in Piraeus
2026	SuperCup Champions	won 18–4 against CN Catalunya in Piraeus

=== The road to the 2013–14 LEN Trophy ===
Round	Team	Home	Away
Group Stage (Group D)	(Russia) SKIF Moscow	13–10	
Group Stage (Group D)	(Italy) Firenze	7–8	
Group Stage (Group D)	(Hungary) Eger	12–6	
Quarterfinals	(Spain) Sabadell	9–10	6–8
Semifinal	(Russia) Kinef Kirishi	8–5	
Final	(Italy) Firenze	10–9	

=== The road to the 2014–15 LEN Euro League ===
Round	Team	Home	Away
Group Stage (Group D)	(Italy) Firenze	14–4	
Group Stage (Group D)	(Netherlands) ZVL Leiden	16–8	
Group Stage (Group D)	(Greece) Vouliagmeni	9–5	
Group Stage (Group D)	(Romania) Târgu Mureș	39–2	
Quarterfinals	(Hungary) Szentes	10–6	15–10
Semifinal	(Russia) Kinef Kirishi	10–8	
Final	(Spain) Sabadell	10–9	

=== The road to the 2020–21 LEN Euro League ===
Round	Team	Home	Away
Group Stage (Group C)	(Italy) Plebiscito Padova	10–7	
Group Stage (Group C)	(Hungary) BVSC Zugló	11–4	
Group Stage (Group C)	(Italy) Lifebrain SIS Roma	12–13	
Group Stage (Group C)	(France) Olympic Nice	10–0	
Quarterfinals	(Spain) Astralpool Sabadell	12–14	10–5
Semifinal	(Hungary) UVSE Hunguest Hotels	9–8	
Final	(Hungary) Dunaújváros	7–6	

=== The road to the 2021–22 LEN Euro League ===
Round	Team	Home	Away
Group Stage (Group F)	(Spain) CN Terrassa	11–5	
Group Stage (Group F)	(Italy) SIS Roma	15–8	
Group Stage (Group F)	(Greece) Ethnikos Piraeus	9–5	
Quarterfinals	(Hungary) Dunaújváros	14–9	10–7
Semifinal	(Hungary) UVSE Hunguest Hotels	18–11	
Final	(Spain) Astralpool Sabadell	11–7	

=== The road to the 2025–26 Champions League ===
Round	Team	Home	Away
Group Stage (Group Α)	(Hungary) UVSE Budapest	9–6	15–16
Group Stage (Group Α)	(Hungary) Dunaújvárosi FVE	16–8	19–3
Group Stage (Group Α)	(Greece) Alimos NAS	20–9	17–8
Quarterfinals	(Spain) Sabadell	10–8	17–12
Semifinal	(Spain) CN Mataró	14–12	
Final	(Hungary) Ferencvárosi TC	17–4 PSO: 3–0	

== Notable players ==
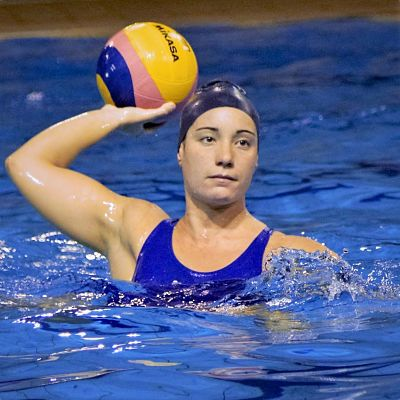
Roberta Bianconi

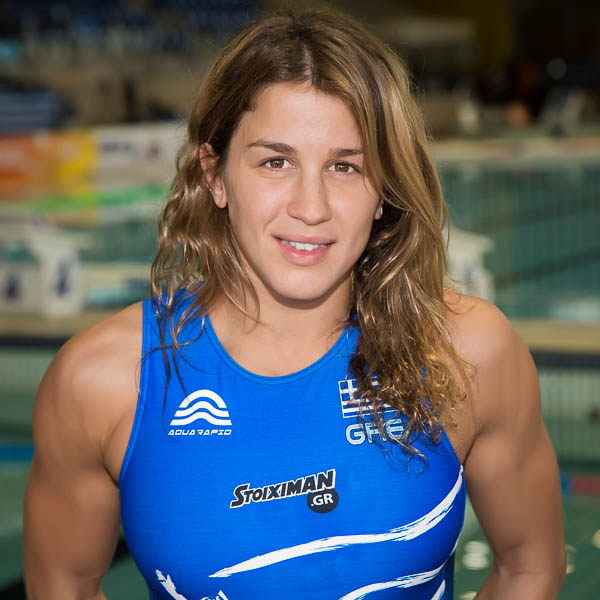
Alexandra Asimaki, 2011 FINA World Player of the Year

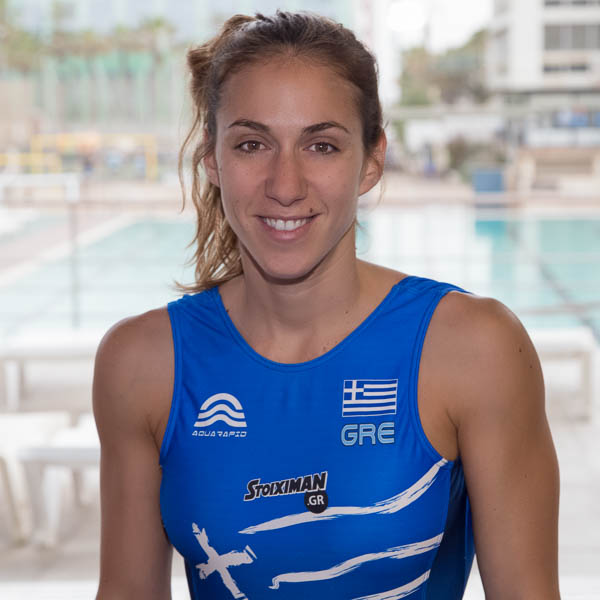
Alkisti Avramidou played for Olympiacos from 2007 to 2021

- (Greece) Sofia Aloupi
- (Greece) Stavroula Antonakou
- (Greece) Dimitra Asilian
- (Greece) Alexandra Asimaki
- (Greece) Alkisti Avramidou
- (Greece) Maria Balomenaki
- (Greece) Alkistis Benekou
- (Greece) Mania Bikof
- (Greece) Kelly Bisba
- (Greece) Anna Chatzigeorgaki
- (Greece) Nefeli Chaldaiou
- (Greece) Athina Chrysikopoulou
- (Greece) Ioanna Chydirioti
- (Greece) Chrysi Diamantopoulou
- (Greece) Stavroula Doureka
- (Greece) Elena Elliniadi
- (Greece) Vaso Eustratiou
- (Greece) Nikoleta Eleftheriadou
- (Greece) Eleftheria Fountotou
- (Greece) Christina Fragopoulou
- (Greece) Eleni Fragopoulou
- (Greece) Georgia Garantzioti
- (Greece) Despoina Gouzoula
- (Greece) Anastasia Kalargirou
- (Greece) Sofia Kalidoni
- (Greece) Milva Kalogerakou
- (Greece) Maria Kanellopoulou
- (Greece) Eleni Kanetidou
- (Greece) Eftychia Karagianni
- (Greece) Zinovia Karagianni
- (Greece) Angeliki Karapataki
- (Greece) Christiana Karousou
- (Greece) Maria Katsari
- (Greece) Kelly Kontogeorgi
- (Greece) Christina Kostaroglou
- (Greece) Rania Kotsafti
- (Greece) Christina Kotsia
- (Greece) Niki Kougioumtzi
- (Greece) Xenia Leontsini
- (Greece) Kyriaki Liosi
- (Greece) Silia Logotheti
- (Greece) Triantafyllia Manolioudaki
- (Greece) Maria Mastori
- (Greece) Vaso Mavrelou
- (Greece) Vaia Mikiki
- (Greece) Antonia Moraiti
- (Greece) Sofia Moraiti
- (Greece) Evi Moraitidou
- (Greece) Anthoula Mylonaki
- (Greece) Maria Myriokefalitaki
- (Greece) Virginia Niarchakou
- (Greece) Eirini Ninou
- (Greece) Dimitra Papanastasiou
- (Greece) Polina Paterou
- (Greece) Kleanthi Pentaraki
- (Greece) Sofia Piskitzi
- (Greece) Eleftheria Plevritou
- (Greece) Margarita Plevritou
- (Greece) Vaso Plevritou
- (Greece) Markella Ploumi
- (Greece) Ilektra Psouni
- (Greece) Stefania Santa
- (Greece) Adamantia Saravelaki
- (Greece) Popi Sifaki
- (Greece) Christina Siouti
- (Greece) Maria Sora
- (Greece) Ioanna Stamatopoulou
- (Greece) Evi Tetzalidou
- (Greece) Sofia Tornarou
- (Greece) Foteini Tricha
- (Greece) Christina Tsoukala
- (Greece) Maria Tsouri
- (Greece) Angeliki Vasilakopoulou
- (Greece) Maria Vasilakopoulou
- (Greece) Katerina Vichou
- (Greece) Eleni Xenaki
- (Australia) Abby Andrews
- (Australia) Hannah Buckling
- (Australia) Keesja Gofers
- (Australia) Bronwen Knox
- (Australia) Ashleigh Southern
- (Brazil) Camila Pedrosa
- (Canada) Kyra Christmas
- (Canada) Ann Dow
- (Canada) Monika Eggens
- (China) Sun Yating
- (Czech Republic) Veronika Bartunkova
- (Hungary) Barbara Bujka
- (Hungary) Eszter Tomaskovics
- (Hungary) Ágnes Valkai
- (Italy) Roberta Bianconi
- (Italy) Giulia Emmolo
- (Kazakhstan) Assel Jakayeva
- (Netherlands) Brigitte Sleeking
- (Netherlands) Yasemin Smit
- (Netherlands) Iefke van Belkum
- (Serbia) Jovana Sekulic
- (Spain) Patricia del Soto
- (Spain) Blanca Gil
- (United States) Kami Craig
- (United States) Jordan Raney
- (United States) Lauren Wenger

== Notable coaches ==
- (Greece) Giorgos Katsoulis
- (Greece) Fontas Moudatsios
- (Greece) Akis Kakarnakis
- (Greece) Charis Pavlidis
- (Serbia) Aleksandar Ćirić

== Personnel ==
=== Management, coaching and technical staff ===
Management
President	(Greece) Michalis Kountouris
Director	(Greece) Nikos Skandalakis
Coaching and technical staff
Head Coach	(Greece) Giorgos Doskas
Assistant Coach	(Greece) Giorgos Fountoulis
Team Manager	(Greece) Alexandra Kalogera
Physio	(Greece) Panagiotis Adamopoulos

== See also ==
- Olympiacos Men's Water Polo Team
