= Maria Tsouri =

Greek water polo player

Personal information
- Nationality: Greek
- Born: 25 May 1986 (age 40) Chios, Greece

Sport
- Sport: Water polo
- Club: AEK
Medal record
Women's water polo
Representing Greece
European Championship
Silver medal – second place	2010 Zagreb	Team competition
FINA Water Polo World League
Gold medal – first place	2005 Kirishi	Team competition
Bronze medal – third place	2010 San Diego	Team competition

Maria Tsouri (Greek: Μαρία Τσουρή; born 25 May 1986) is a Greek water polo player, part of Greece women's national water polo team that won the silver medal at the 2010 European Championship in Zagreb, the gold medal at the 2005 FINA Women's Water Polo World League in Kirishi and the bronze medal at the 2010 World League in San Diego. She also competed with the Greece women's national water polo team in the 2006 European Water Polo Championship (6th place), the 2007 World Championship (8th place), the 2008 European Championship (6th place) and the 2008 Olympic Games in Beijing (8th place).

At club level, she played -most notably- for Olympiacos, Ethnikos Piraeus and Glyfada. She won the LEN Trophy in 2010 with Ethnikos, and the 2011 Greek Championship (as well as the third place at the 2010–11 LEN Champions Cup) with Olympiacos.

== Personal ==
Maria is married with the Greek basketball player Panagiotis Vasilopoulos since 2012. The couple has two sons.

== See also ==
- Greece women's Olympic water polo team records and statistics
- List of women's Olympic water polo tournament goalkeepers
