= 2019–20 Women's LEN Trophy =

European water polo tournament

- League: Women's LEN Trophy
- Sport: Water Polo
- Duration: March 2020
- Number of teams: 4
- Finals champions: no winner

Women's LEN Trophy seasons
- ← 2018–19 2020–21 →

The 2019–20 Women's LEN Trophy would have been the 21st edition of the European second-tier tournament for women's water polo clubs. It was originally going to be played in March 2020, but due to the COVID-19 pandemic, it was postponed. But on the 5 of May 2020, LEN decided to cancel all the remainder of Water Polo club competitions, without crowning a winner.
