= Dimitra Asilian =

Greek water polo player (born 1972)

Personal information
- Nationality: Greek
- Born: 10 July 1972 (age 53) Piraeus, Greece

Sport
- Sport: Water polo
Medal record
Women's water polo
Representing Greece
Olympic Games
Silver medal – second place	2004 Athens	Team competition

Dimitra Asilian (Greek: Δήμητρα Ασιλιάν, born 10 July 1972) is a retired female Greek water polo player of Armenian descent and Olympic silver medalist with the Greece women's national water polo team.

She received a silver medal at the 2004 Summer Olympics in Athens.

She scored 8 goals at the 1999 Women's European Water Polo Championship in Prato, where Greece finished 5th.

At club level, Asilian started swimming at Greek powerhouse Olympiacos youth Academy at the age of 6. Olympiacos women's water polo department was founded in 1988 and Asilian went on to play for Olympiacos for a total of 29 years (including her youth career) before her retirement at the end of 2006–2007 season at age 35. Asilian is the record goalscorer in the history of the Greek Women's Water Polo League with 703 goals, a record she achieved in a 15-year span (1992–2007). She won 2 Greek Championships (1994–95, 1997–98) and the fourth place in the 1995–96 LEN European Cup with Olympiacos.

== See also ==
- List of Olympic medalists in water polo (women)
