= AEK (women's water polo) =

Greek water polo club from Athens

- Founded: 2019
- League: A2 Ethniki Water Polo
- Based in: Athens, Greece
- Colors
- President: Alexis Alexiou
- Head coach: Marco Micic
- Website: aek.gr

AEK Women's Water Polo Club is the women's water polo department of the major Greek multi-sport club, AEK Sports Club, based in Athens, Greece. The club was founded in 2019 and compete in the Greek Women's Water Polo League.

== History ==
The women's water polo team of AEK started its efforts from the A2 Greek Women's Water Polo League in the 2019–20 season. On 6 March 2020, the newly formed AEK women's water polo team gave its first official match. In their maiden season the team won the promotion to the Greek Women's Water Polo League as champion of the second division.

== Honours ==
AEK Women's Water Polo honours aek.gr
| Type | Competition | Titles | Winners | Runners-up |
|---|---|---|---|---|
| Domestic | A2 Greek Women's Water Polo League | 1 | 2020 | |

- record
- ^{S} Shared record

== Current squad ==
Season 2020–21

| No. | Nat. | Player | Birth Date | Position | L/R |
| 1 | (Greece) | Maria Tsouri | May 25, 1986 (age 40) | Goalkeeper | |
| 2 | (Greece) | Emmanouela Archontaki | | Goalkeeper | |
| 3 | (Greece) | Christina Kotsia | July 10, 1994 (age 31) | Centre back | |
| 4 | (Greece) | Kiki Stratidaki | June 7, 1996 (age 30) | Centre forward | |
| 5 | (Greece) | Anastasia Loudi | September 21, 2000 (age 25) | Centre back | |
| 6 | (Greece) | Marianna Mastrokalou | April 12, 2000 (age 26) | Centre forward | |
| 7 | (Greece) | Katerina Gavala | | Wing | |
| 10 | (Greece) | Smaragda Grozopoulou | January 4, 2002 (age 24) | Wing | |
| 11 | (Greece) | Katerina Michailidou | | Wing | |
| 12 | (Greece) | Elli Protopappa | July 23, 1999 (age 26) | Wing | |
| 13 | (Greece) | Evdokia-Maria Tsimara | January 17, 2003 (age 23) | Wing | |
| 14 | (Greece) | Evfrosini Tsimara | | Wing | |
| 15 | (Greece) | Efstathia-Nefeli Kovasevic | | Wing | |
| 16 | (Greece) | Myrto Kassari | | Wing | |
| 17 | (Greece) | Anastasia Bekri | | Goalkeeper | |
| 18 | (Greece) | Panagiota Zachariou | | Centre forward | |
| 19 | (Greece) | Zoi-Eleni Vamvakari | | Wing | |
| 20 | (Greece) | Marina Kalpouzou | | Goalkeeper | |
| 21 | (Greece) | Danai Kalpouzou | | Wing | |
| 22 | (Greece) | Melachrini Papadimitriou | | Wing | |

=== Staff ===
Technical Staff
| Section Chairman | (Greece) Alexis Alexiou |
| Section Leader | (Greece) Petros Deverikos |
| Technical Manager | (Greece) Vasilis Siamanis |
| Head Coach | (Serbia) Marco Micic |
| Technical Director | (Greece) Maria Balomenaki |

== See also ==
- AEK Men's Water Polo Club

== Sponsorships ==
- Great Sponsor: Molto
