= Kanellopoulos =

Kanellopoulos (Greek: Κανελλόπουλος) is a Greek surname, meaning "son of Kanellos". The feminine form is Kanellopoulou (Κανελλοπούλου). Notable people with the surname include:

- Angeliki Kanellopoulou (born 1965), Greek tennis player
- Kanellos Kanellopoulos (born 1957), Greek cyclist
- Maria Kanellopoulou (born 1977), Greek water polo player
- Panagiotis Kanellopoulos (1902–1986), Greek writer, politician and Prime Minister of Greece
- Takis Kanellopoulos (1933–1990), Greek film director and screenwriter
