= Patricia del Soto =

Spanish water polo player (born 1980)

Patricia Del Soto
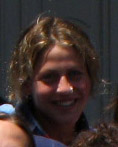

Personal information
- Full name: Patricia Del Soto Traver
- Nationality: Spain
- Born: 16 December 1980 (age 45) Esplugues de Llobregat

Sport
- Sport: Water polo
- Handedness: right
- Position: Goalkeeper
Medal record
Women's water polo
Representing Spain
European Championships
Silver medal – second place	2008 Malaga	Team

Patricia Del Soto Traver (born 16 December 1980 in Esplugues de Llobregat) is a Spanish female water polo goalkeeper. In her youth, she played with Club Natació Esplugues before competing for CE Mediterrani from 1995 to 1998, and then for CN Sabadell until 2005. She moved to Greece where she played for Ethnikos Pireaus in 2006, Olympiacos in 2007 and 2008 and NC Vouliagmeni between 2009 and 2011.

She won numerous domestic titles in Spain and Greece. With Vouliagmeni, she won the LEN Women's Champions' Cup in 2009 and 2010, and the Women's LEN Super Cup in 2009.

She played 174 times for the Spain women's national water polo team, playing in the European Championships in 2001, 2003, 2006 and 2008. She also competed at four World Championships, in 2003, 2005, 2007 and 2009) and in 5 World Leagues.
