= Maria Balomenaki =

Greek water polo player

Personal information
- Nationality: Greek
- Born: March 14, 1983 (age 43) Chania, Greece

Sport
- Sport: Water polo

Maria Balomenaki (Greek: Μαρία Μπαλωμενάκη; born March 14, 1983) is a retired Greek water polo player. She played for Olympiacos for 12 seasons (2001–2013) and was the team's captain for several years. She won 2 Greek Championships (2008–09, 2010–11) and numerous European honours (2007–08 LEN Trophy runners-up, 2010–11 LEN Champions Cup third place among many others).
