= Maria Kanellopoulou =

Greece water polo player

Personal information
- Nationality: Greek
- Born: March 28, 1977 (age 49) Athens, Greece

Sport
- Sport: Water polo
Medal record
Women's water polo
Representing Greece
FINA Junior World Championships
Gold medal – first place	1997 Prague	Team competition

Maria Kanellopoulou (Greek: Μαρία Κανελλοπούλου; born March 28, 1977) is a Greek water polo player. She was a member of the Greece women's national water polo team that finished in the fourth place at the 2001 European Championship in Budapest. She also competed in the 1998 World Championship in Perth where Greece finished in fifth place, and the 2003 World Championship in Barcelona where the Greek team finished 9th. Kanellopoulou was also part of the Greece women's national water polo team that won the gold medal at the 1997 Junior World Championship in Prague.

At club level, she played for Greek powerhouse Olympiacos for 14 years (1992–2006), winning two Greek Championships and the fourth place in the 1995–96 LEN European Cup.
