= Triantafyllia Manolioudaki =

Greek water polo player

Personal information
- Nationality: Greek
- Born: March 19, 1986 (age 40) Chania, Greece
- Height: 5 ft 7 in (170 cm)

Sport
- Sport: Water polo
- Club: Olympiacos
Medal record
Women's water polo
Representing Greece
World Championship
Gold medal – first place	2011 Shanghai	Team competition
European Championship
Silver medal – second place	2010 Zagreb	Team competition
Silver medal – second place	2012 Eindhoven	Team competition
FINA World League
Bronze medal – third place	2010 San Diego	Team competition
Bronze medal – third place	2012 Changshu	Team competition

Triantafyllia Manolioudaki (Greek: Τριανταφυλλιά Μανωλιουδάκη; born 19 March 1986) is a Greek water polo player, captain of the Greek powerhouse Olympiacos and key member of the Greece women's national water polo team.

Manolioudaki took part with the Greece national team that brought home the Water polo at the 2011 World Aquatics Championships – Women's tournament#Final ranking gold medal at the 2011 World Aquatics Championships which took place in Shanghai in July 2011.

== Club career ==
- 2007– Olympiacos Piraeus

== Club honours ==
=== Olympiacos ===
- 1 LEN Euro League
  - 2015
- 1 LEN Trophy
  - 2014
- 4 Greek Championships
  - 2009, 2011, 2014, 2015

== National team honours ==
- (gold) Gold medal
  - World Championship (1): 2011
- (silver) Silver medals
  - European Championship (2): 2010, 2012
- (bronze) Bronze medals
  - World League (2): 2010, 2012

== See also ==
- List of world champions in women's water polo
- List of World Aquatics Championships medalists in water polo
