= Sandra Domene =

Spanish water polo player (born 2000)

Personal information
- Full name: Sandra Domene Pérez
- Born: 4 April 2000 (age 26) Terrassa, Spain
- Height: 1.72 m (5 ft 8 in)

Sport
- Sport: Water polo
- Position: Goalkeeper
- Current club: CN Terrassa
National team
- Years: Team
- 2017—: Spain
Medal record
World Championships
Silver medal – second place	2017 Budapest	Team
European Games
Silver medal – second place	2015 Baku	Team

Sandra Domene Pérez (born 4 April 2000 Terrassa) is a Spanish water polo goalkeeper.

She competed for the Spain women's national water polo team in the 2015 European Games, and 2017 World Aquatics Championships.
