= Evgeniia Golovina =

Russian water polo player

Personal information
- Full name: Evgeniia Pavlovna Golovina
- Nationality: Russia
- Born: 14 July 1999 (age 27) Zlatoust, Russia
- Height: 1.73 m (5 ft 8 in)

Sport
- Sport: Water polo
- Position: Goalkeeper
- Current club: Uralochka Zlatoust
Medal record
Representing Russia
European Games
Gold medal – first place	2015 Baku	Team

Evgeniia Pavlovna Golovina (Russian: Евгения Павловна Головина; born 14 July 1999) is a Russian water polo player. She competed in the 2020 Summer Olympics.
