= 2018–19 Women's LEN Trophy =

Water polo tournament

- League: Women's LEN Trophy
- Sport: Water Polo
- Duration: 12 – 13 April 2019
- Number of teams: 4 (from 4 countries)
- Finals champions: (Italy) Orizzonte Catania (1st title)
- Runners-up: (Hungary) UVSE

Women's LEN Trophy seasons
- ← 2017–18 2021-22 →

The 2018–19 Women's LEN Trophy was the 20th edition of the European second-tier tournament for women's water polo clubs. It was contested in Kirishi, Russia, on 12 and 13 April 2019.

Italy's Orizzonte Catania defeated Hungary's UVSE in the final match. Orizzonte won the title for the first time in its history, gaining the only trophy that was still missing from its list of Honours. It was also the first time that a female head coach (former player Martina Miceli, gold medalist at the Athens 2004 Olympic Games) led a club to a European cup victory.

== Teams ==
The participants were the four teams eliminated from the Euro League's quarterfinals.

Team 1	Agg.	Team 2	1st leg	2nd leg
Kinef Kirishi (Russia)	18–19	(Greece) NC Vouliagmeni	11–10	7–9
Orizzonte Catania (Italy)	20–23	(Spain) CN Sabadell	9–12	11–11
UVSE (Hungary)	13–14	(Italy) Plebiscito Padova	6–6	7–8
CN Sant Andreu (Spain)	13–26	(Greece) Olympiacos	7–16	6–10

Final 4
(Hungary) UVSE
(Italy) Orizzonte Catania
(Russia) Kinef Kirishi
(Spain) CN Sant Andreu

== Final Four ==
The draw of the semifinals and the allocation of the Final 4 to Kirishi were announced by LEN on 13 March 2019.

=== Semifinals ===
12 Apr 2019; 17:00 (UTC+3)	Report	Orizzonte Catania (Italy)	12–8	(Spain) CN Sant Andreu	Neftyanik Sports Complex (Kirishi); Referees: Häntschel (GER), Dutilh-Dumas (NED)
12 Apr 2019; 17:00 (UTC+3)	Report	Score by quarters: 4–1, 2–2, 3–2, 3–3			Neftyanik Sports Complex (Kirishi); Referees: Häntschel (GER), Dutilh-Dumas (NED)
12 Apr 2019; 17:00 (UTC+3)	Report	2: Garibotti, Bianconi, Aiello, Palmieri, Marletta	Goals	4: Sleeking; 3: Crespi	Neftyanik Sports Complex (Kirishi); Referees: Häntschel (GER), Dutilh-Dumas (NED)

12 Apr 2019; 18:30 (UTC+3)	Report	Kinef Kirishi (Russia)	8–10	(Hungary) UVSE	Neftyanik Sports Complex (Kirishi); Referees: Peris (CRO), Markopoulou (GRE)
12 Apr 2019; 18:30 (UTC+3)	Report	Score by quarters: 2–3, 3–3, 1–1, 2–3			Neftyanik Sports Complex (Kirishi); Referees: Peris (CRO), Markopoulou (GRE)
12 Apr 2019; 18:30 (UTC+3)	Report	2: Prokofyeva; 1: six players	Goals	4: Keszthelyi; 2: Faragó	Neftyanik Sports Complex (Kirishi); Referees: Peris (CRO), Markopoulou (GRE)

=== Finals ===
==== 3rd place ====
13 Apr 2019; 13:00 (UTC+3)	Report	CN Sant Andreu (Spain)	11–15	(Russia) Kinef Kirishi	Neftyanik Sports Complex (Kirishi); Referees: Häntschel (GER), Markopoulou (GRE)
13 Apr 2019; 13:00 (UTC+3)	Report	Score by quarters: 0–5, 2–4, 4–4, 5–2			Neftyanik Sports Complex (Kirishi); Referees: Häntschel (GER), Markopoulou (GRE)
13 Apr 2019; 13:00 (UTC+3)	Report	5: Keuning; 1: six players	Goals	3: Prokofyeva; 2: five players	Neftyanik Sports Complex (Kirishi); Referees: Häntschel (GER), Markopoulou (GRE)

==== 1st place ====
13 Apr 2019; 14:30 (UTC+3)	Report	Orizzonte Catania (Italy)	10–9	(Hungary) UVSE	Neftyanik Sports Complex (Kirishi); Referees: Peris (CRO), Dutilh-Dumas (NED)
13 Apr 2019; 14:30 (UTC+3)	Report	Score by quarters: 2–3, 4–1, 2–3, 2–2			Neftyanik Sports Complex (Kirishi); Referees: Peris (CRO), Dutilh-Dumas (NED)
13 Apr 2019; 14:30 (UTC+3)	Report	3: Bianconi; 2: Riccioli	Goals	3: Szűcs; 1: six players	Neftyanik Sports Complex (Kirishi); Referees: Peris (CRO), Dutilh-Dumas (NED)

2018–19 Women's LEN Trophy
Champions

Orizzonte Catania
1st title

== See also ==
- 2018–19 LEN Euro League Women
- 2018–19 LEN Euro Cup
