= Margarita Plevritou =

Greek water polo player

Personal information
- Nationality: Greek
- Born: 17 November 1994 (age 31) Thessaloniki, Greece

Sport
- Country: Greece
- Sport: Water polo
- Club: Olympiacos
Medal record
Women's Water polo
Representing Greece
European Championship
Silver medal – second place	2018 Barcelona
Silver medal – second place	2022 Split
Bronze medal – third place	2024 Eindhoven
FINA World League
Bronze medal – third place	2012 Changshu

Margarita Plevritou (Greek: Μαργαρίτα Πλευρίτου; born 17 November 1994) is a Greek water polo player for Olympiacos. She was part of the Greek team that won the silver medal at the 2018 European Championship in Barcelona.

Her sisters, Vasiliki and Eleftheria are also water polo players.

== Career ==
As a professional player for Olympiacos, Plevritou has won the LEN Women's Euro League, the LEN Super Cup, the Women's LEN Trophy, and several Greek Women's Water Polo League titles.

== International competitions ==
- (silver) 2018 Women's European Water Polo Championship, Barcelona, Spain, silver medal
- (bronze) 2012 FINA Women's Water Polo World League, Changsu, China, 3rd place
- (gold) 2012 FINA Women's World Youth Water Polo Championships, Perth, Australia, 1st place
- (bronze) 2013 FINA Women's Water Polo Junior World Championships, Volos, Greece, 3rd place
