= Chrysi Diamantopoulou =

Greek water polo player

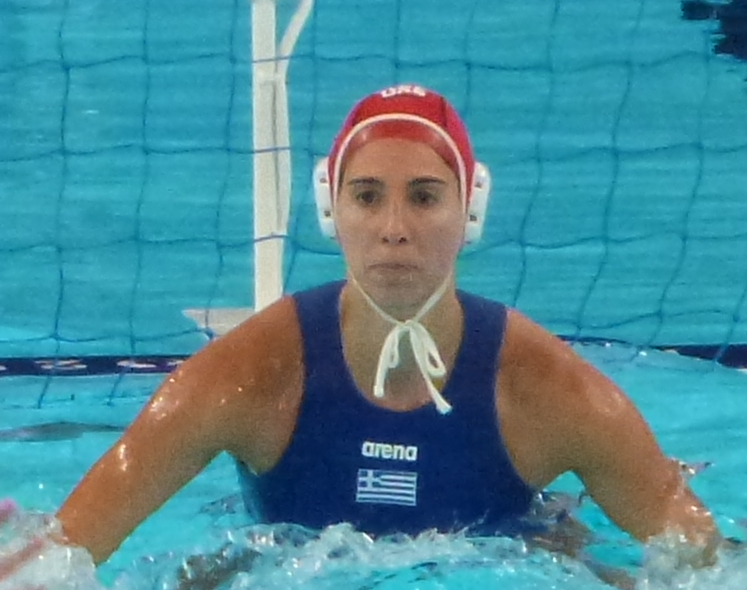

Personal information
- Full name: Chrysoula Diamantopoulou
- Nationality: Greek
- Born: 22 September 1995 (age 30) Athens, Greece
- Height: 1.86 m (6 ft 1 in)

Sport
- Country: Greece
- Sport: Water polo
- Club: Olympiacos
Medal record
Women's water polo
Representing Greece
European Championship
Silver medal – second place	2018 Barcelona
Bronze medal – third place	2024 Eindhoven
FINA World League
Bronze medal – third place	2012 Changshu

Chrysoula "Chrysi" Diamantopoulou (Greek: Χρυσή Διαμαντοπούλου; born 22 September 1995) is a Greek former water polo player, who played as a goalkeeper mailnly for Olympiacos and the Greece women's national team. She was part of the Greek team that won the silver medal at the 2018 European Championship in Barcelona and the sixth place at the 2015 World Aquatics Championships.

== Career ==
As a professional player Diamantopoulou has won two Greek Women's Water Polo League titles, the Women's LEN Trophy in 2014 and the LEN Women's Euro League in 2015.

== International competitions ==
- (silver) 2018 Women's European Water Polo Championship, Barcelona, Spain, silver medal
- (bronze) 2012 FINA Women's Water Polo World League, Changsu, China, 3rd place
- (gold) 2012 FINA Women's World Youth Water Polo Championships, Perth, Australia, 1st place
- (bronze) 2013 FINA Women's Water Polo Junior World Championships, Volos, Greece, 3rd place
