= Alkistis Benekou =

Greek water polo player

Alkistis Christina Benekou
Personal information
- Born: 31 January 1994 (age 32) Greece

Sport
- Sport: Water polo
- Club: Ethnikos
- Updated on 16 December 2022

Alkistis Christina Benekou (Greek: Άλκηστις Χριστίνα Μπενέκου, born 31 January 1994) is a water polo player from Greece.

She played on the Greece Junior National Team which won gold at the 2011 LEN Junior Water Polo European Championship, and was part of the Greek team at the 2013 World Aquatics Championships.

In 2014, she joined Arizona State University and began playing for their Sun Devils water polo team as a centre forward. In early 2017, she became one of the top ten scorers in the team's history.

Benekou is currently playing for Ethnikos Piraeus. Her twin sister Ioli is also a waterpolo player.

== Titles ==
=== With Olympiacos ===
- 1 LEN Euroleague Women: 2021
- 1 Greek Women's Water Polo Championship: 2021
- 1 Greek Women's Water Polo Cup: 2021

=== With Ethnikos ===
- 1 LEN Trophy: 2022
- 1 Greek Women's Water Polo Cup: 2024

== See also ==
- Greece at the 2013 World Aquatics Championships
