= Xenofon Moudatsios =

Greek water polo player

Personal information
- Born: 28 March 1960
- Died: 18 September 2020 (aged 60)

Sport
- Sport: Water polo

Xenofon Moudatsios (28 March 1960 – 18 September 2020) was a Greek former water polo player who competed in the 1984 Summer Olympics. At club level he played for Panathinaikos and Ethnikos. He was also coach of Olympiacos and Glyfada women's teams. With Glyfada he managed to win the 2000 LEN Champions League, the first European trophy won by a Greek women's water polo team.
