= Water polo at the 2015 European Games =

- Venue: Baku Aquatics Centre
- Dates: 12–21 June 2015
- Competitors: 364 (208 men, 156 women) from 16 (men), 12 (women) nations

The water polo tournaments at the 2015 European Games in Baku, Azerbaijan were held at the Baku Aquatics Centre in the Baku Games Cluster from 12 to 21 June 2015. 16 teams competed in the men's tournament and 12 teams in the women's tournament.

Water polo was not included in the earliest list of sports confirmed for the 2015 Games, as the European swimming authorities at that stage were minded not to take part, but after negotiations with the organising authorities were made, a compromise was reached whereby, in 2015, these events were for junior players only - in effect, athletes between the ages of 16 and 17 for both men and women.

== Qualification ==
Both of Azerbaijan's teams automatically qualified. The junior teams from 2013 European Junior Championships automatically qualified, while the 2015 European Junior Championships had a qualification tournaments for the Games. Each qualifying team was allowed to select 13 athletes for their team.

=== Men ===
Means of qualification	Date	Venue	Number of berths	Nation(s) qualified
Host nation	–	–	1	Azerbaijan
2013 European Junior Water Polo Championships	8–15 September 2013	(Malta) Gżira	7	Montenegro; Serbia; Italy; Hungary; Croatia; Russia; Spain
2015 European Games Qualification Tournament A	12–15 March 2015	(Netherlands) Nijverdal	2	Greece; Ukraine
2015 European Games Qualification Tournament B	12–15 March 2015	(Austria) Graz	2	Slovakia; Turkey
2015 European Games Qualification Tournament C	12–15 March 2015	(Poland) Szczecin	2	France; Romania
2015 European Games Qualification Tournament D	12–15 March 2015	(Malta) Gżira	2	Germany; Malta
Total			16	

=== Women ===
Means of qualification	Date	Venue	Number of berths	Nation(s) qualified
~~Host nation~~	–	–	~~1~~	~~Azerbaijan~~
2013 European Junior Water Polo Championships	1–8 September 2013	(Turkey) Istanbul	6	Greece; Spain; Netherlands; Italy; Hungary; Russia
2015 European Games Qualification Tournament A	12–15 March 2015	(France) Nice	2	France; Great Britain
2015 European Games Qualification Tournament B	12–14 March 2015	(Slovakia) Bratislava	2	Slovakia; Israel
2015 European Games Qualification Tournament C	12–14 March 2015	(Serbia) Belgrade	2	Germany; Serbia
Total			12	

== Medal summary ==
=== Events ===
Event	Gold	Silver	Bronze
Men	Serbia; Marko Janković; Petar Kasum; Jasmin Kolašinac; Nikola Lukić; Vladan Mitrović; Dragoljub Rogač; Kristian Šulc; Stefan Todorovski; Marko Tubić; Petar Velkić; Matija Vlahović; Đorđe Vučinić; Uroš Vuković	Spain; Oriol Albacete; Jordi Chico; Álex de la Fuente; Josu Fernández; Álvaro García; Pablo Gómez; Álvaro Granados; Guillermo Palomar; Nikolas Paúl; Josep Puig; Oriol Rodríguez; Marc Salvador; Francisco Valera	Greece; Kimon Alexiou; Konstantinos Chondrokoukis; Nikolaos Delagrammatikas; Nikolaos Gardikas; Grigorios Giannopoulos; Nikolaos Kalargyros; Foivos Kalis; Adamantios Mantis (†); Dimitrios Nikolaidis; Alexandros Papanastasiou; Nikolaos Papasifakis; Polymeris Siordilis; Dimitrios Skoumpakis
Women	Russia; Maria Bersneva; Anastasia Fedotova; Daria Gerzanich; Evgeniia Golovina; Anna Isakova; Polina Kempf; Bella Khamzaeva; Elena Kotanchyan; Alena Serzhantova; Svetlana Stepakhina; Veronika Vakhitova; Elizaveta Zaplatina; Aleksandra Zelenkovskaia	Spain; Alejandra Aznar; Carmen Baringo; Alba Bonamusa; Paula Crespí; Helena Dalmases; Sandra Domene; Laura Gómez; Blanca Goset; Mireia Guiralt; Paula Leitón; Elia Montoya; Anna Roldán; Paula Rutgers	Greece; Adamantia Doureka; Nikoleta Eleftheriadou; Eleni Elliniadi; Michaela Kalogerakou; Silia Logotheti; Evangelia Loudi; Ifigenia Mavrota; Maria Patra; Vasiliki Plevritou; Elisavet Protopapas; Artemis Safeti; Eleni Sotireli; Ioanna Stamatopoulou
