= Greek Field Hockey League =

- Sport: Field hockey
- Founded: 1994
- Folded: 2014
- No. of teams: 6
- Country: Greece
- Continent: Europe
- Last champion: Ethnikos Piraeus
- Most titles: AOH Hymettus (10)
- Website: hellenichockey.gr

The Greek Field Hockey Championship or Greek Field Hockey League (Greek: Ελληνικό Πρωτάθλημα Χόκει επί Χόρτου) was the most important domestic competition of the Field Hockey in Greece. The championship started after founding of Hellenic Hockey Federation in 1994. There have been eighteen championships until abolishing of Hockey Federation during November 2014. The Greek Federation was abolished for the ground that the number of teams was less of required number. Also there have been serious complaints for conducting fake youth championships in order to participant pupils to have taken bonus grades for universities' entrance examinations.

== Champions ==
=== Outdoor's Championships ===
Season	Champion	source
1994-95	AOH Hymettus	
1995-96	AOH Agios Andreas	
1996-97	Napaios Apollon	
1997-98	not held	
1998-99	not held	
1999-00	AOH Agios Andreas	
2000-01	AOH Hymettus	
2001-02	AOH Hymettus	
2002-03	AOH Hymettus	
2003-04	AOH Hymettus	
2004-05	Napaios Apollon	

Season	Champion	source
2005-06	AOH Hymettus	
2006-07	AOH Hymettus	
2007-08	Napaios Apollon	
2008-09	AOH Hymettus	
2009-10	AOH Hymettus	
2010-11	AOH Hymettus	
2011-12	Ethnikos Piraeus	
2012-13	Asteras Agioi Anargyroi	
2013-14	Ethnikos Piraeus	
2014-15	not held	
2015-16	not held	
2016-17	not held	
2017-18	AOH Agios Andreas	

=== Performance by club ===
- AOH Hymettus: 10
  - 1995, 2001, 2002, 2003, 2004, 2006, 2007, 2009, 2010, 2011
- Napaios Apollon: 3
  - 1999, 2005, 2008
- AOH Agios Andreas: 2
  - 1996, 2000, 2018
- Ethnikos Piraeus: 2
  - 2012, 2014
- Asteras Agioi Anargyroi: 1
  - 2013
