= Marina Cordobés =

Spanish water polo player (born 1997)

Personal information
- Full name: Marina Cordobes Navarro
- Nationality: Spanish
- Born: 28 April 1997 (age 29)

Sport
- Sport: Water polo
- Handedness: right
Medal record
Women's water polo
Representing Spain

Marina Cordobés Navarro (born 28 April 1997) is a Spanish water polo player, who plays for CN Sabadell.

She participated in the 2014 Women's LEN Super Cup, 2016 Women's LEN Super Cup, 2019 Women's LEN Super Cup, 2014–15 LEN Euro League Women, 2015–16 LEN Euro League Women and 2019 Women's LEN Super Cup
