= Theodoros Lorantos =

Greek water polo player

Personal information
- Nationality: Greek, French
- Born: 5 July 1971 (age 55) Athens, Greece
- Height: 182 cm (72 in)

Sport
- Sport: Water polo

Senior clubs
- Years: Team
- 1991-1999: NC Vouliagmeni
- 1999-2003: Panathinaikos
- 2003–2004: Ethnikos Piraeus
- 2002-2005: NC Vouliagmeni
- 2005-2006: NO Chania
National team
- Years: Team
- –: Greece men's national water polo team (player)

Teams coached
- 2006-2008: ANO Glyfada
- 2008-2010: NC Vouliagmeni (assistant coach)
- 2010-2015: NC Vouliagmeni
- 2015-2016: Panathinaikos Water Polo Club
- 2018-2020: AO Palaiou Falirou
- 2017-2020: Greece men's national water polo team (Junior Men)
- 2020 - 2021: Greece women's national (
Medal record
Men's water polo
Representing Greece
FINA World Cup
Silver medal – second place	1997 Athens, Greece
Head coach for Greece
FINA junior Water Polo World Championship
Gold medal – first place	2017 Belgrade, Serbia	Head coach
Gold medal – first place	2019 Kuwait, Kuwait	Head coach
LEN European U19 Water Polo Championship
Gold medal – first place	2018 Minsk, Belarus	Head coach

Theodoros Lorantos (born 5 July 1971) is a Greek water polo coach and former player who competed in the 1992 Summer Olympics, in the 1996 Summer Olympics, and in the 2000 Summer Olympics, having scored 12 goals in 19 appearances. He last coached Greece women's national water polo team. He now is the head coach of France’s national water polo team.

Lorantos started playing water polo at the age of 16 at NC Vouliagmeni club. In 1997, he won the LEN Cup Winners' Cup with NC Vouliagmeni.

== Honours ==
=== As player ===
==== NC Vouliagmeni ====
- (gold) Greek water polo championships (4): 1991, 1997, 1998
- (silver) 2nd place in Greek water polo league (3): 1989, 1996, 1999
- Greek water polo cups (2): 1996, 1999
- LEN Cup Winners' Cup (1): 1997
- LEN Euro Cup
  - Runners-up (1): 2004

==== National team ====
- (silver) Silver Medal in 1997 FINA Men's Water Polo World Cup
- Olympic Appearances(3): 1992, 1996, 2000

=== As Coach ===
NC Vouliagmeni

- (gold) Greek water polo championships (1): 2012
- Greek water polo cups (1): 2012
- (silver) 2nd place in Greek water polo league (3): 2011, 2013, 2014

National Team

- (gold) Junior Men Water Polo World Championship (2): 2017, 2019
- (gold) LEN European U19 Water Polo Championship (1): 2018
