= Silia Logotheti =

Greek water polo player

Personal information
- Nationality: Greece
- Born: 4 October 1998 (age 28) Marousi
- Height: 171 cm (67 in)
- Weight: 66 kg (146 lb)

Sport
- Sport: Water polo
- Current club: Olympiacos
- Number: 15

Senior clubs
- Years: Team
- ?-?: Olympiacos
Medal record
Representing Greece
European Games
Bronze medal – third place	2015 Baku	Team

Silia Logotheti (born 4 October 1998) is a Greek female water polo player. She plays for Olympiacos in Greece. She was part of the Greece women's team winning the bronze medal at the 2015 European Games in Baku.
