= Firenze Waterpolo =

Italian water polo club

- Founded: 1996
- League: Serie B (men); Serie A1 (women)
- Based in: Florence, Italy
- Colors: Red and black
- President: Cipriano Catellacci
- Head coach: Bosazzi (men); Tempestini (women)
- Website: http://www.firenzepallanuoto.it/

Firenze Waterpolo is an Italian water polo club from the city of Florence. Firenze is currently best known for its women's team, which was finalist of the 2013-14 LEN Trophy.

== History ==
The club established in 1996 as Firenze Pallanuoto. In 2012 the club merged with Fiorentina Waterpolo and created Firenze Waterpolo.

== Honours ==
women

LEN Trophy

- Runners-up (1): 2013-14
