= Vasiliki Plevritou =

Greek water polo player

Personal information
- Nationality: Greece
- Born: 8 June 1998 (age 28) Thessaloniki, Greece
- Height: 181 cm (71 in)
- Weight: 65 kg (143 lb)

Sport
- Sport: Water polo
- Position: Driver
- Current club: Olympiacos
- Number: 10

Senior clubs
- Years: Team
- –: Olympiacos
Medal record
World Championship
Gold medal – first place	2025 Singapore	Team
European Championships
Silver medal – second place	2022 Split
Bronze medal – third place	2024 Eindhoven
Bronze medal – third place	2026 Funchal
European Games
Bronze medal – third place	2015 Baku	Team

Vasiliki "Vaso" Plevritou (born 8 June 1998) is a Greek female water polo player for Olympiacos in Greece. She was a part of the team winning the 2015 Women's LEN Super Cup. She was part of the Greece national team winning the bronze medal at the 2015 European Games. She started competing in water polo in 2008.

Plevritou competed at the 2024 Summer Olympics.

Her sisters, Eleftheria and Margarita are also water polo players.
