= Alexia Kammenou =

Greek water polo coach

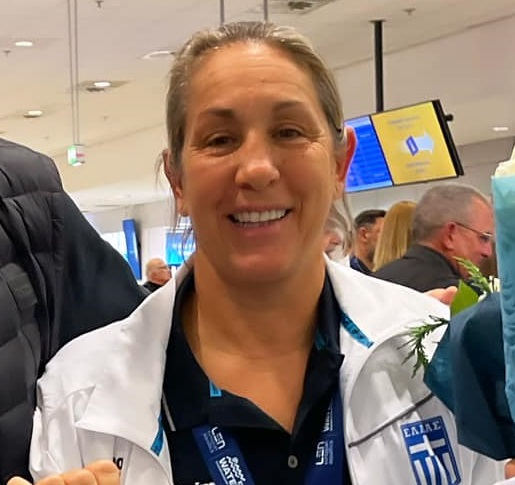

Personal information
- Full name: Alexia Anna Kammenou
- Born: 25 July 1969 (age 57) Vouliagmeni, Greece
Medal record
Head Coach for Greece women's national water polo team
Representing Greece
European Championships
| Silver medal – second place | 2022 Split |
| Bronze medal – third place | 2024 Eindhoven |

Alexia Anna Kammenou (Greek: Αλεξία Άννα Καμμένου; born 25 July 1969) is a Greek former water polo player and the coach of Greece women's national water polo team since 2021. She was named as the Best Sports Coach in Greece for 2010.

As a water polo athlete, Kammenou won four championships with NO Vouliagmeni (1991, 1993, 1994, 1997) in Greece, and also played for PAOK (2004, 2005), scoring a total of 230 goals from 1988 to 2005. She made her debut in the Greek National Team in 1987 and played 182 times, scoring 84 goals. She participated in one World Championship (1998), six European Championships (1989, 1991, 1993, 1995, 1997, 1999), and two World Cups (1997, 1999).

After a coach, she coached NO Vouliagmeni for ten seasons, winning the Greece's championship in 2007 and the Greek Cup in 2019. In Europe, she celebrated two Champions Cups (2009, 2010) and two Super Cups in the same years. In addition, she coached ANO Glyfada from 2013 to 2015.

In the spring of 2021, Kammenou became the coach of the National Youth Team. In November of the same year, she took charge of the National Women's Team. She reshaped the Greek national team, eventually winning the silver medal in 2022 Women's European Water Polo Championship at Split, and the silver medal in 2024 Women's European Water Polo Championship| at Eindhoven.

== Personal life ==
Her brother is the politician Panagiotis Kammenos. Kammenou was married with Konstantinos Kokkinakis and they have one daughter.
