= Ioannis Giannouris =

Greek water polo player

Personal information
- Born: January 13, 1958 (age 67)

Sport
- Sport: Water polo

Ioannis Giannouris (born 13 January 1958) is a retired Greek water polo player who competed in the 1980 Summer Olympics.

== See also ==
- Greece men's Olympic water polo team records and statistics
- List of men's Olympic water polo tournament goalkeepers
