= Greek Women's Water Polo Cup =

Water polo competition

Greek Water Polo cup
- Countries: Greece
- Confederation: KOE
- Founded: 2017
- Domestic championship: Greek championship
- Current winner: (2025–2026) Olympiacos Piraeus (7)
- Most titles: Olympiacos Piraeus (7)

The Greek Women’s Water Polo Cup is the second domestic competition of the Greek women's water polo and it began with 2017–18 season. The first final four of the competition was held in Karpenisi in March of 2018 and the first winner were Olympiacos Piraeus, winning NO Vouliagmeni in the final.

== Finals ==
Season	Winner	Score	Finalist	Place	Source
2017–18	Olympiacos Piraeus	14 – 11	NO Vouliagmeni	Karpenisi	
2018–19	NO Vouliagmeni	10 – 8	Olympiacos Piraeus	Chios	
2019–20	Olympiacos Piraeus	16 – 4	Nireas Chalandri	Faliro	
2020–21	Olympiacos Piraeus	11 – 8	NO Vouliagmeni	Vouliagmeni	
2021–22	Olympiacos Piraeus	14 – 7	ANO Glyfada	Larissa	
2022–23	Olympiacos Piraeus	11 – 6	NO Vouliagmeni	Patras	
2023–24	Ethnikos Piraeus	13 – 11 p (9–9)	Olympiacos Piraeus	Vouliagmeni	
2024–25	Olympiacos Piraeus	12 – 10	NO Vouliagmeni	Volos	
2025–26	Olympiacos Piraeus	15 – 13	NO Vouliagmeni	Larissa	

== Performance by club ==
Club	Winner	Finalist	Years won
Olympiacos Piraeus	7	2	2018, 2020, 2021, 2022, 2023, 2025, 2026
NO Vouliagmeni	1	5	2019
Ethnikos Piraeus	1	-	2024
Nireas Chalandri	-	1	–
ANO Glyfada	-	1	–

== Final–4 MVP ==
Year	Player	Club
2018	Monika Eggens	Olympiacos Piraeus
2019	Ashleigh Johnson	NO Vouliagmeni
2020	Eleftheria Plevritou	Olympiacos Piraeus
2021	Alkisti Avramidou	Olympiacos Piraeus
2022	Eleni Xenaki	Olympiacos Piraeus
2023	Eleni Xenaki	Olympiacos Piraeus
2024	Eleni Sotireli	Ethnikos Piraeus
2025	Abby Andrews	Olympiacos Piraeus
2026	Stephania Santa	Olympiacos Piraeus

== Final–4 Top scorers ==
Year	Player	Club	Goals
2018	Alkisti Avramidou	Olympiacos Piraeus	8
2018	Monika Eggens	Olympiacos Piraeus	8
2019	Alkisti Avramidou	Olympiacos Piraeus	6
2019	Alexandra Asimaki	Olympiacos Piraeus	6
2020	Eleftheria Plevritou	Olympiacos Piraeus	6
2021	Nikoleta Eleftheriadou	Olympiacos Piraeus	6
2021	Ilse Koolhaas	NO Vouliagmeni	6
2022	Eleni Xenaki	Olympiacos Piraeus	7
2023	Amy Ridge	NO Vouliagmeni	7
2024	Ariadni Karampetsou	Ethnikos Piraeus	10
2025	Lola Moolhuijzen	NO Vouliagmeni	8
2026	Kitty-Lynn Joustra	NO Vouliagmeni	9
