= 2020–21 LEN Euro League Women =

Water polo tournament

- League: LEN Euro League Women
- Sport: Water Polo
- Duration: 4 February – 1 May 2021
- Teams: 18 (from 7 countries)
- Finals champions: Olympiacos
- Runners-up: Dunaújváros

Euro League Women seasons
- ← 2019–20 2021−22 →

The 2020–21 LEN Euro League Women was the 34th edition of the major competition for European women's water polo clubs. It is started on 2 February 2021 and it ended with the Final 4 on 30 April and 1 May 2021.

== Schedule ==
The schedule of the competition is as follows.

Phase	Round	First leg	Second leg
Qualifying	Qualification round I	27–29 November 2020	
Qualifying	Qualification round II	5–7 February 2021	
Knockout phase	Quarterfinals	27 February 2021	13 March 2021
Final 4		30 April 2021	1 May 2021

== Qualification round ==
The qualification round is scheduled for 5–7 February 2021.

=== Group A ===
Pos	Team	Pld	W	D	L	GF	GA	GD	Pts	Qualification	(Hungary) UVS	(Russia) URA	(Italy) ORI	(France) LIL	(Spain) SAN
1	(Hungary) UVSE Hunguest Hotel (H)	4	3	1	0	54	33	+21	10	Knockout phase	—	16–14	8–8	10–6	20–5
2	(Russia) Dynamo Uralochka	4	3	0	1	67	35	+32	9	Knockout phase	—	—	13–10	—	23–5
3	(Italy) Ekipe Orizzonte	4	2	1	1	53	32	+21	7		—	—	—	—	22–7
4	(France) Lille UC	4	1	0	3	24	45	−21	3		—	4–17	4–13	—	10–5
5	(Spain) CN Sant Andreu	4	0	0	4	22	75	−53	0		—	—	—	—	—

Source: LEN
(H) Hosts

=== Group B ===
Pos	Team	Pld	W	D	L	GF	GA	GD	Pts	Qualification	(Russia) KIR	(Spain) MAT	(Hungary) FTC	(Spain) MED	(Italy) VER
1	(Russia) Kinef-Surgutneftegas	4	4	0	0	56	43	+13	12	Knockout phase	—	10–8	15–14	—	—
2	(Spain) CN Mataró	4	3	0	1	42	27	+15	9	Knockout phase	—	—	13–9	6–5	15–3
3	(Hungary) FTC Telekom	4	2	0	2	51	50	+1	6		—	—	—	—	12–11
4	(Spain) CE Mediterrani	4	1	0	3	39	48	−9	3		10–15	—	11–16	—	
5	(Italy) Vetrocar CSS Verona (H)	4	0	0	4	36	56	−20	0		11–16	—	—		—

Source: LEN
(H) Hosts

=== Group C ===
Pos	Team	Pld	W	D	L	GF	GA	GD	Pts	Qualification	(Italy) ROM	(Greece) OLY	(Italy) PAD	(Hungary) ZUG	(France) NIC
1	(Italy) Lifebrain SIS Roma	4	3	1	0	44	32	+12	10	Knockout phase	—	13–12	—	10–9	10–0
2	(Greece) Olympiacos	4	3	0	1	43	24	+19	9	Knockout phase	—	—	10–7	11–4	10–0
3	(Italy) Plebiscito Padova	4	2	1	1	39	30	+9	7		11–11	—	—	11–9	10–0
4	(Hungary) BVSC-Zugló	4	1	0	3	32	32	0	3		—	—	—	—	—
5	(France) Olympic Nice	4	0	0	4	0	40	−40	0	Disqualified	—	—	—	0–10	—

Source: LEN

=== Group D ===
Pos	Team	Pld	W	D	L	GF	GA	GD	Pts	Qualification	(Spain) SAB	(Hungary) DUN	(Greece) NCV
1	(Spain) Astrapool Sabadell	2	1	1	0	21	18	+3	4	Knockout phase	—	—	—
2	(Hungary) Dunaújváros	2	1	0	1	22	23	−1	3	Knockout phase	11–14	—	11–9
3	(Greece) Vouliagmeni	2	0	1	1	16	18	−2	1		7–7	—	—

Source: LEN

== Knockout phase ==
=== Quarter-finals ===
Team 1	Agg.	Team 2	1st leg	2nd leg
Kinef-Surgutneftegas (Russia)	23–24	(Russia) Dynamo Uralochka	8–11	10–7 (5–6 p)
Astrapool Sabadell (Spain)	19–22	(Greece) Olympiacos	14–12	5–10
CN Mataró (Spain)	18–21	(Hungary) UVSE Hunguest Hotel	9–12	9–9
Lifebrain SIS Roma (Italy)	17–21	(Hungary) Dunaújváros	11–11	6–10

=== Final four ===
Semifinals
30 April
(Greece) Olympiacos	9
(Hungary) UVSE Hunguest Hotel	8
30 April
(Hungary) Dunaújváros	15
(Russia) Dynamo Uralochka	14

Final
1 May
(Greece) Olympiacos	7
(Hungary) Dunaújváros	6
Third place
1 May
(Hungary) UVSE Hunguest Hotel	15
(Russia) Dynamo Uralochka	10
