= Adamantia Doureka =

Greek water polo player

Personal information
- Nationality: Greece
- Born: 26 September 1998 (age 28) Athens, Greece
- Height: 166 cm (65 in)
- Weight: 50 kg (110 lb)

Sport
- Sport: Water polo

Senior clubs
- Years: Team
- –: Olympiacos
Medal record
Representing Greece
European Games
| Bronze medal – third place | 2015 Baku | Team competition |

Adamantia Doureka (born 26 September 1998) is a Greek water polo player. She played for Olympiacos in Greece. She was part of the Greece women's team winning the bronze medal at the 2015 European Games in Baku.
