= 2021–22 LEN Euro League Women =

European women's water polo

- League: LEN Euro League Women
- Sport: Water Polo

Euro League Women seasons
- ← 2020–21 2022−23 →

The 2021–22 LEN Euro League Women is the 34th edition of the major competition for European women's water polo clubs. It started on 18 November 2021.

== Qualification round ==
=== Group A ===
Pos	Team	Pts	W	D	L	GF	GA
1	(Russia) Dynamo Uralochka	12	4	0	0	68	37
2	(Spain) CN Terrassa	9	3	0	1	55	30
3	(Greece) ANO Glyfada	6	2	0	2	46	37
4	(Italy) CSS Verona	3	1	0	3	54	44
5	(Israel) ASA Tel Aviv	0	0	0	4	25	100

- (Russia) Dynamo Uralochka 15–11 ANO Glyfada (Greece)
- (Italy) CSS Verona 26–10 ASA Tel Aviv (Israel)
- (Spain) CN Terrassa 10–8 CSS Verona (Italy)
- (Greece) ANO Glyfada 18–2 ASA Tel Aviv (Israel)
- (Spain) CN Terrassa 27–5 ASA Tel Aviv (Israel)
- (Russia) Dynamo Uralochka 12–9 CN Terrassa (Spain)
- (Russia) Dynamo Uralochka 12–9 CSS Verona (Italy)
- (Greece) ANO Glyfada 12–11 CSS Verona (Italy)
- (Russia) Dynamo Uralochka 29–8 ASA Tel Aviv (Israel)
- (Spain) CN Terrassa 9–5 ANO Glyfada (Greece)

=== Group B ===
Pos	Team	Pts	W	D	L	GF	GA
1	(Italy) SIS Roma	15	5	0	0	90	37
2	(Spain) Mediterrrani	12	4	0	1	71	47
3	(Hungary) Ferencvarosi	9	3	0	2	64	35
4	(France) Lille	6	2	0	3	69	51
5	(Netherlands) ZVL–Tetteroo	3	1	0	4	58	59
6	(Malta) Sirens	0	0	0	5	16	139

- (France) Lille 27–3 Sirens (Malta)
- (Italy) SIS Roma 20–7 ZVL–Tetteroo (Netherlands)
- (Spain) Mediterrrani 10–8 Ferencvarosi (Hungary)
- (Italy) SIS Roma 15–10 Mediterrrani (Spain)
- (Hungary) Ferencvarosi 11–8 Lille (France)
- (Netherlands) ZVL–Tetteroo 25–2 Sirens (Malta)
- (Hungary) Ferencvarosi 13–7 ZVL–Tetteroo (Netherlands)
- (Italy) SIS Roma 31–4 Sirens (Malta)
- (Spain) Mediterrrani 12–9 Lille (France)
- (Italy) SIS Roma 8–4 Ferencvarosi (Hungary)
- (Spain) Mediterrrani 28–5 Sirens (Malta)
- (France) Lille 13–9 ZVL–Tetteroo (Netherlands)
- (Hungary) Ferencvarosi 28–2 Sirens (Malta)
- (Italy) SIS Roma 16–12 Lille (France)
- (Spain) Mediterrrani 11–10 ZVL–Tetteroo (Netherlands)

=== Group C ===
Pos	Team	Pts	W	D	L	GF	GA
1	(Italy) Plebiscito Padova	13	4	1	0	58	33
2	(Spain) CN Mataró	12	4	0	1	70	36
3	(Greece) NC Vouliagmeni	10	3	1	1	54	39
4	(Hungary) BVSC-Zuglo	6	2	0	3	43	56
5	(Germany) Spandau	1	0	1	4	47	76
6	(France) Nice	1	0	1	4	40	72

- (Italy) Plebiscito Padova 9–8 CN Mataró (Spain)
- (Greece) NC Vouliagmeni 13–5 BVSC-Zuglo (Hungary)
- (Germany) Spandau 13–13 Nice (France)
- (Spain) CN Mataró 20–6 Spandau (Germany)
- (Hungary) BVSC-Zuglo 12–6 Nice (France)
- (Italy) Plebiscito Padova 7–7 NC Vouliagmeni (Greece)
- (Italy) Plebiscito Padova 11–6 BVSC-Zuglo (Hungary)
- (Spain) CN Mataró 19–7 Nice (France)
- (Greece) NC Vouliagmeni 15–13 Spandau (Germany)
- (Italy) Plebiscito Padova 16–4 Spandau (Germany)
- (Spain) CN Mataró 15–8 BVSC-Zuglo (Hungary)
- (Greece) NC Vouliagmeni 15–6 Nice (France)
- (Spain) CN Mataró 8–6 NC Vouliagmeni (Greece)
- (Italy) Plebiscito Padova 15–8 Nice (France)
- (Hungary) BVSC-Zuglo 12–11 Spandau (Germany)

=== Group D ===
Pos	Team	Pts	W	D	L	GF	GA
1	(Spain) CN Sabadell	12	4	0	0	91	23
2	(Italy) Ekipe Orizzonte	9	3	0	1	68	33
3	(Greece) Ethnikos Piraeus	6	2	0	2	70	38
4	(Slovakia) Ol. Kosice	3	1	0	3	31	84
5	(Portugal) Pacense	0	0	0	4	18	100

- (Spain) CN Sabadell 34–3 Pacense (Portugal)
- (Italy) Ekipe Orizzonte 15–14 Ethnikos Piraeus (Greece)
- (Greece) Ethnikos Piraeus 25–4 Pacense (Portugal)
- (Spain) CN Sabadell 15–8 Ethnikos Piraeus (Greece)
- (Italy) Ekipe Orizzonte 21–6 Ol. Kosice (Slovakia)
- (Slovakia) Ol. Kosice 16–9 Pacense (Portugal)
- (Italy) Ekipe Orizzonte 25–2 Pacense (Portugal)
- (Spain) CN Sabadell 31–5 Ol. Kosice (Slovakia)
- (Spain) CN Sabadell 11–7 Ekipe Orizzonte (Italy)
- (Greece) Ethnikos Piraeus 23–4 Ol. Kosice (Slovakia)

== Preliminary round ==
=== Group E ===
Pos	Team	Pts	W	D	L	GF	GA
1	(Spain) CN Sabadell	6	2	0	1	30	23
2	(Hungary) Dunaujvaros	6	2	0	1	32	28
3	(Spain) CN Mataró	6	2	0	1	32	26
4	(Hungary) Ferencvarosi	0	0	0	3	21	38

- (Spain) CN Sabadell 11–6 Ferencvarosi (Hungary)
- (Hungary) Dunaujvaros 12–8 CN Mataró (Spain)
- (Spain) CN Mataró 14–5 Ferencvarosi (Hungary)
- (Spain) CN Sabadell 10–7 Dunaujvaros (Hungary)
- (Hungary) Dunaujvaros 13–10 Ferencvarosi (Hungary)
- (Spain) CN Mataró 10–9 CN Sabadell (Spain)

=== Group F ===
Pos	Team	Pts	W	D	L	GF	GA
1	(Greece) Olympiacos Piraeus	9	3	0	0	35	18
2	(Greece) Ethnikos Piraeus	6	2	0	1	27	21
3	(Spain) CN Terrassa	3	1	0	2	24	26
4	(Italy) SIS Roma	0	0	0	3	20	41

- (Greece) Olympiacos Piraeus 11–5 CN Terrassa (Spain)
- (Greece) Ethnikos Piraeus 14–5 SIS Roma (Italy)
- (Greece) Olympiacos Piraeus 15–8 SIS Roma (Italy)
- (Greece) Ethnikos Piraeus 8–7 CN Terrassa (Spain)
- (Spain) CN Terrassa 12–7 SIS Roma (Italy)
- (Greece) Olympiacos Piraeus 9–5 Ethnikos Piraeus (Greece)

=== Group G ===
Pos	Team	Pts	W	D	L	GF	GA
1	(Hungary) UVSE	7	2	1	0	33	26
2	(Russia) Dynamo Uralochka	6	2	0	1	39	32
3	(Greece) NC Vouliagmeni	3	1	0	2	25	30
4	(Italy) Ekipe Orizzonte	1	0	1	2	24	33

- (Hungary) UVSE 11–5 NC Vouliagmeni (Greece)
- (Russia) Dynamo Uralochka 15–8 Ekipe Orizzonte (Italy)
- (Greece) NC Vouliagmeni 9–7 Ekipe Orizzonte (Italy)
- (Hungary) UVSE 13–12 Dynamo Uralochka (Russia)
- (Russia) Dynamo Uralochka 12–11 NC Vouliagmeni (Greece)
- (Hungary) UVSE 9–9 Ekipe Orizzonte (Italy)

=== Group H ===
Pos	Team	Pts	W	D	L	GF	GA
1	(Italy) Plebiscito Padova	7	2	1	0	31	25
2	(Russia) Kinef Kirishi	6	1	2	0	32	28
3	(Spain) Mediterrrani	3	1	1	1	34	31
4	(Greece) ANO Glyfada	1	0	0	3	34	47

- (Italy) Plebiscito Padova 10–8 Mediterrrani (Spain)
- (Russia) Kinef Kirishi 16–12 ANO Glyfada (Greece)
- (Italy) Plebiscito Padova 14–10 ANO Glyfada (Greece)
- (Russia) Kinef Kirishi 9–9 Mediterrrani (Spain)
- (Spain) Mediterrrani 17–12 ANO Glyfada (Greece)
- (Italy) Plebiscito Padova 7–7 Kinef Kirishi (Russia)

== Quarterfinals ==
Team 1	Agg.	Team 2	1st leg	2nd leg
Olympiacos Piraeus (Greece)	24–16	(Hungary) Dunaújváros	14–9	10–7
Plebiscito Padova (Italy)	W.O.	(Russia) Dyn. Uralochka	8–11	W.O.
UVSE Budapest (Hungary)	14–19	(Russia) Kinef Kirishi	7–8	7–11
CN Sabadell (Spain)	21–14	(Greece) Ethnikos Piraeus	13–8	8–6

05/02/2022 (Greece) Olympiacos Piraeus 14–9 Dunaujvaros (Hungary)

26/02/2022 (Hungary) Dunaujvaros 7–10 Olympiacos Piraeus (Greece)

20/02/2022 (Italy) Plebiscito Padova 8–11 Dynamo Uralochka (Russia)

03/03/2022 (Russia) Dynamo Uralochka W.O. Plebiscito Padova (Italy)

05/02/2022 (Russia) Kinef Kirishi 8–7 UVSE (Hungary)

26/02/2022 (Hungary) UVSE7–11 Kinef Kirishi (Russia)

05/02/2022 (Greece) Ethnikos Piraeus 8–13 CN Sabadell (Spain)

26/02/2022 (Spain) CN Sabadell 8–6 Ethnikos Piraeus (Greece)

- Kinef Kirishi and Dynamo Uralochka were disqualified. Padova and UVSE replaced them in the F4.

== Final Four ==
Semifinals
2 April
(Greece) Olympiacos Piraeus	18
(Hungary) UVSE Hunguest Hotel	11
2 April
(Spain) CN Sabadell	9
(Italy) Plebiscito Padova	8

Final
3 April
(Greece) Olympiacos Piraeus	11
(Spain) CN Sabadell	7
Third place
3 April
(Hungary) UVSE Hunguest Hotel	6
(Italy) Plebiscito Padova	11
