= 2021–22 Women's LEN Trophy =

European water polo tournament

- League: Women's LEN Trophy
- Sport: Water Polo
- Duration: 25 – 30 March 2022
- Number of teams: 2 (from 2 countries)
- Finals champions: (Greece) Ethnikos (2nd title)

Women's LEN Trophy seasons
- ← 2018-19 2022–23 →

The 2021–22 Women's LEN Trophy is the 23rd edition of the European second-tier tournament for women's water polo clubs. It was a two-legged final that was played in Dunaújváros, Hungary, and Piraeus, Greece on 25 and 30 March 2022. Ethnikos won its second LEN Trophy to become the Greek team with the most titles regarding this competition.

== Teams ==
The participants were the four teams eliminated from the Euro League's quarterfinals but due to the Russian invasion in Ukraine, only Dunaújvárosi FVE and Ethnikos Piraeus will contest the final after the disqualification of Russian teams.

.

| Team 1 | Agg. | Team 2 | 1st leg | 2nd leg |
|---|---|---|---|---|
| Dunaújváros (Hungary) | 16–24 | (Greece) Olympiacos | 9–14 | 7–10 |
| Ethnikos (Greece) | 14–21 | (Spain) Sabadell | 8–13 | 6–8 |

== Finals ==
| 25 Mar 2022; 19:00 local time | Dunaújváros (Hungary) | 8–12 | (Greece) Ethnikos | Dunaújváros; Referees: Ferrari (ITA) – Alexandrescu (ROU) |
| 25 Mar 2022; 19:00 local time | Score by quarters: 2-2, 3-4, 1-3, 2-3 | | | Dunaújváros; Referees: Ferrari (ITA) – Alexandrescu (ROU) |
| 25 Mar 2022; 19:00 local time | G. Gurisatti 2, B. Horvath 2, K. Garda 2 | Goals | A. Benekou 3 | Dunaújváros; Referees: Ferrari (ITA) – Alexandrescu (ROU) |

| 30 Mar 2022; 20:00 local time | Ethnikos (Greece) | 14–9 | (Hungary) Dunaújváros | Piraeus; Attendance: 850; Referees: Cabanas (ESP) – Zwart (NED) |
| 30 Mar 2022; 20:00 local time | Score by quarters: 5-1, 3-3, 3-2, 3-3 | | | Piraeus; Attendance: 850; Referees: Cabanas (ESP) – Zwart (NED) |
| 30 Mar 2022; 20:00 local time | A. Benekou 3, C. Ioannou 3 | Goals | D. Szilágyi 3 | Piraeus; Attendance: 850; Referees: Cabanas (ESP) – Zwart (NED) |

== See also ==
- 2021–22 LEN Euro League Women
