= Nikoleta Eleftheriadou =

Greek water polo player

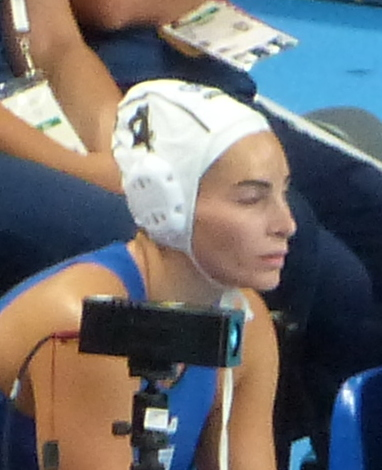
- Eleftheriadou at the 2024 Summer Olympics

Personal information
- Nationality: Greek
- Born: 17 January 1998 (age 28) Athens, Greece
- Height: 174 cm (69 in)
- Weight: 63 kg (139 lb)

Sport
- Sport: Water polo
- Position: Defender

Senior clubs
- Years: Team
- -2024: Olympiacos
- 2026-: Vouliagmeni
Medal record
Women's water polo
Representing Greece
European Championship
Silver medal – second place	2018 Barcelona	Team
Bronze medal – third place	2024 Eindhoven	Team
European Games
Bronze medal – third place	2015 Baku	Team

Nikoleta "Nikol" Eleftheriadou (Greek: Νικολέτα "Νικόλ" Ελευθεριάδου, born 17 January 1998) is a Greek female water polo player. After retiring from competitive water polo in 2024, she returned to the sport in 2026, resuming her playing career, signing a two-year contract with NC Vouliagmeni.

She previously played for Olympiacos and the Greece women's national team. As a player of Olympiacos, she won the 2015 Women's LEN Super Cup. She was part of the Greece women's national water polo team that won the silver medal at the 2018 European Championship in Barcelona and the bronze medal at the 2015 European Games in Baku. She has won gold, silver and bronze medals in World and European competitions with the Greece national junior water polo squads.

== Personal ==
Eleftheriadou was in a relationship with Bulgarian-Greek basketball player Sasha Vezenkov from 2022 to 2025. The relationship became public in January 2023, when Eleftheriadou shared a photograph of the couple while attending the wedding of basketball player Kostas Sloukas.

In March 2026, Greek media reported that the couple had separated, with reports placing the end of the relationship in December 2025.
