= Eleftheria Plevritou =

Greek water polo player (born 1997)

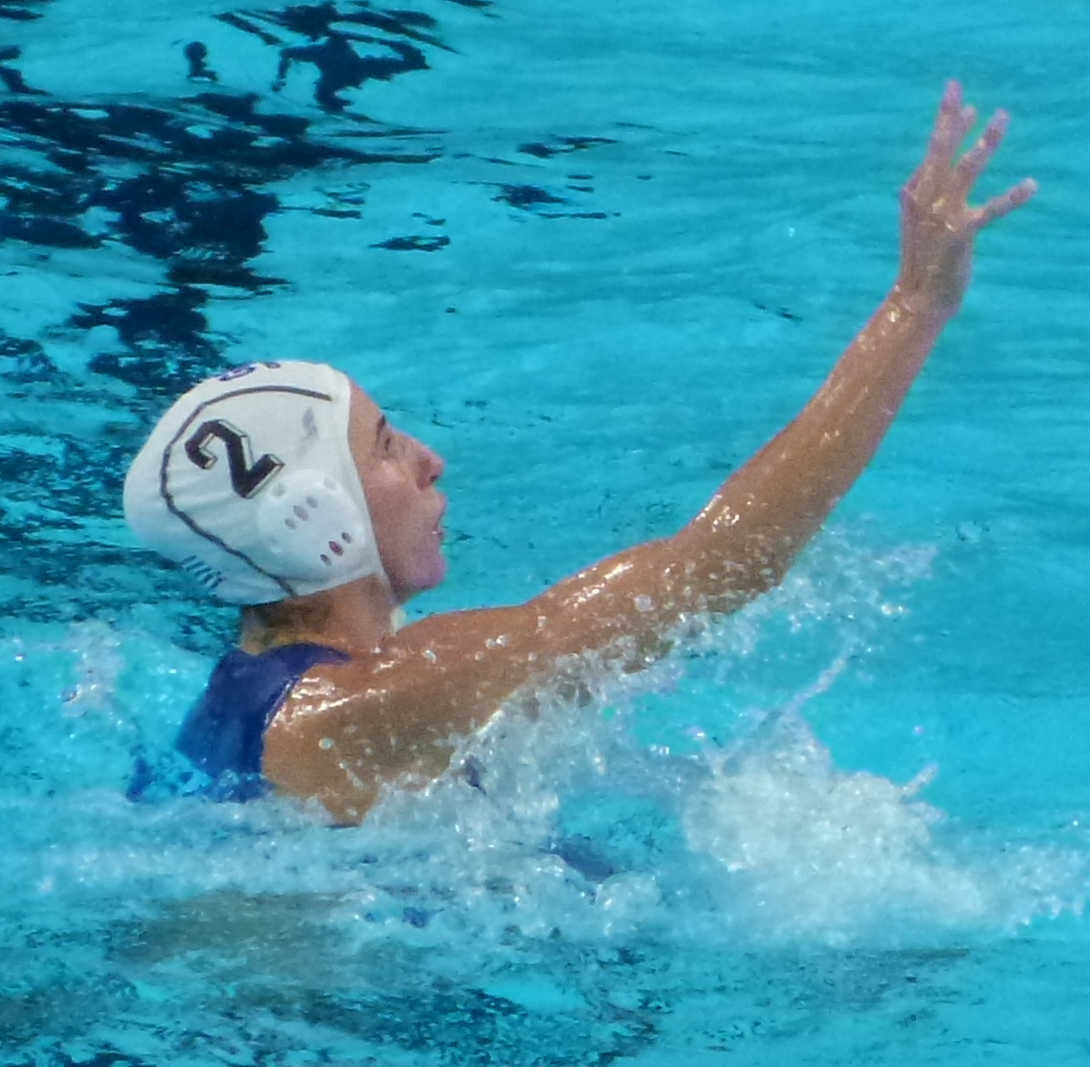

Personal information
- Nationality: Greek
- Born: 23 April 1997 (age 29) Thessaloniki, Greece

Sport
- Country: Greece
- Sport: Water polo
- Club: Ferencvárosi
Medal record
Women's Water polo
Representing Greece
World Championship
Gold medal – first place	2025 Singapore	Team
European Championship
Silver medal – second place	2018 Barcelona
Silver medal – second place	2022 Split
Bronze medal – third place	2024 Eindhoven
Bronze medal – third place	2026 Funchal
FINA World League
Bronze medal – third place	2012 Changshu
Mediterranean Games
Bronze medal – third place	2018 Tarragona	Team

Eleftheria Plevritou (Greek: Ελευθερία Πλευρίτου; pronounced [e-lef-he-ria ple-vri-tu]) (Thessaloniki, 23 April 1997) is a Greek water polo player for Ferencváros and the Greece women's national team. She was part of the Greece women's national water polo team that won the silver medal at the 2018 European Championship in Barcelona. She is considered as one of the best female players in water polo.

Her sisters, Vasiliki and Margarita are also water polo players.

== Career ==
Eleftheria Plevritou is a high-level water polo athlete with plenty of participation with the national team of Greece since 2010. She first played with the senior team at an early age of 14 years old and took 3rd place in the FINA World League Super Final 2012.

As a professional player for Olympiacos, Plevritou has won the LEN Women's Euro League, in 2015 and 2021, the LEN Super Cup in 2015 and 2021, the Women's LEN Trophy, in 2014 and several Greek Women's Water Polo League. From 2014 till 2021 she has 8 Greek Women's Water Polo League in a row. 3 Greeks Women's Cups in 2018, 2020, 2021. From 2014 until today her team is always in the top teams of Europe.

== International competitions ==
- (silver) 2018 Women's European Water Polo Championship, Barcelona, Spain, silver medal
- (bronze) 2012 FINA Women's Water Polo World League, Changshu, China, bronze medal
- (gold) 2012 FINA World Women's Youth Water Polo Championships, Perth, Australia, 1st place (best 7 players )
- (bronze) 2013 FINA World Women's Junior Water Polo Championships, Volos, Greece, 3rd place
- (gold) 2013 LEN Women's European Youth Water Polo Championships, Istanbul, Turkey, 1st place (MVP)
- (gold) 2014 LEN Women's European Junior Water Polo Championships, Ostia, Italy, 1st place (MVP)
- (bronze) 2016 LEN Women's European Junior Water Polo Championships, The Hague, Netherlands, 3rd place
- (silver) 2017 FINA World Women's Junior Water Polo Championships, Volos, Greece, 2nd place
- (gold) 2018 LEN Women's Europa Cup Final 6, Pontevedra, Spain 1st place
- (bronze) 2018 Mediterranean Games, Tarragona, Spain, 3rd place

== Awards ==
- 2022 European Water Polo Championship MVP of the Tournament
- 2024 World Water Polo Championship All Star Team of the Tournament
