= Giulia Emmolo =

Italian water polo player (born 1991)

Personal information
- Full name: Giulia Enrica Emmolo
- Nationality: Italian
- Born: 16 October 1991 (age 34) Imperia, Liguria
- Height: 5 ft 7 in (170 cm)
- Weight: 148 lb (67 kg)

Sport
- Country: Italy
- Sport: Water polo
- Club: Rapallo Pallanuoto
Medal record
Olympic Games
Silver medal – second place	2016 Rio de Janeiro	Team
World Championships
Bronze medal – third place	2015 Kazan	Team
European Championships
Gold medal – first place	2012 Eindhoven
Bronze medal – third place	2016 Belgrade
FINA World League
Silver medal – second place	2011 Tianjin
Silver medal – second place	2014 Kunshan
Silver medal – second place	2019 Budapest
- Updated on 12 June 2019

Giulia Enrica Emmolo (born 16 October 1991) is an Italian water polo player. She was part of the Italian team that won the silver medal at the 2016 Olympics and the bronze medal at the 2015 World Championships. She also competed at the 2012 Summer Olympics.

== See also ==
- List of Olympic medalists in water polo (women)
- List of World Aquatics Championships medalists in water polo
