= NC Vouliagmeni =

Aquatic sports club in Greece

- Founded: 1937
- League: A1 Ethniki Water Polo
- Based in: Vouliagmeni, Athens
- Colours
- Club titles: European Titles: 6
- Website: nov.gr

NO Vouliagmeni or "NOV" (Greek: Ναυτικός Όμιλος Βουλιαγμένης, "NOB" = Nautical Club of Vouliagmeni) is a major aquatic sports club, founded by local sportsmen in 1937 in the seaside resort of Vouliagmeni, Athens, Greece. The club is located on the eastern edge of the Mikro Kavouri peninsula, adjacent to the Astir Palace Hotel and overlooking the bay, town and lake of Vouliagmeni.

The club also takes particular pride in being an "extended family" for all its past and present athletes. Almost all its coaches and sports staff are past club athletes, and members are encouraged to involve their children in club sports from the youngest age possible.

== Activities ==
The club admits members and their guests and operates a marina, a waterskiing school, junior and Olympic competition sailing boats and facilities, an open-air, heated swimming pool, two rocky beaches, members' indoor and outdoor lounges, reading and conference rooms, a first-aid station, a gym, and an upscale restaurant. The club publishes a quarterly illustrated newsletter, the "Tríaina" (Τρίαινα, "Trident"), distributed free. As part of the celebrations for the club's seventy years, a memorial volume, "In Search of the Sporting Ideal", was published in 2008, in commemoration of the club's history. The volume chronicles the club's foundation and development, and pays particular tribute to the many club athletes who have taken part in Olympic Games and won Olympic medals. The most notable Olympic athlete to have been fostered at the club is windsurfer Nikolaos Kaklamanakis (gold medal, Atlanta Olympics, 1996, and silver medal, Athens Olympics, 2004).

The outdoor, heated pool hosts swimming, finswimming, synchronized swimming and water polo teams and the respective training schools for children. The club hosts two annual competition meetings for youngsters, the "Tzeláteia" swimming gala and the "Chatzitheodórou" water polo Cup, as well as annual water skiing and sailing events. In addition to regular training for its young athletes, the club organises training schools for beginners, open to all children interested in swimming, finswimming, water polo, boat sailing, windsurfing, synchronized swimming, and waterskiing. Four periods are offered per year in total, two (winter and spring) during school season and two more during the summer vacations.

Sports activities for members include aquarobics, aerobics, martial arts classes, long-distance sea swimming, water skiing, and Olympic and recreational sailing and windsurfing. The club also provides mooring for recreational boats owned by members. Several social events and functions are also held at the club, including concerts, art exhibitions, lectures, receptions, dinner parties, the Christmas Eve and New Year's Eve balls, the all-day "May Day at the Club" barbecue, and the midsummer "Full Moon Ball".

== Crest and colours ==
The club crest depicts a blue anchor set inside a white lifebuoy with eight red stripes; blue, white and red being the club colors.

== Water polo ==
The women's and men's water polo teams are a traditional force in European water polo and have won many Greek and several European Championships and Cups. The club often hosts LEN Euroleague and LEN Cup tournaments, its star players consistently being capped for the Greek men's and women's national teams.

The women's team are the reigning Greek champions (2010) and also the reigning European champions for the second consecutive year (2009, 2010). In 2009 they won the LEN Champions' Cup in Kirishi, Russia, defeating the Italian champions, Orizzonte Catania, in the final. In 2010 they won the LEN Champions' Cup in Corfu, Greece, defeating the Russian champions, Kinef Kirishi, in the final.

In addition to the men's and women's teams, the club maintains water polo teams for girls and boys aged 9 and upwards, and participates in all relevant youth competitions. All teams train under the supervision of head coaches (2010) Ioannis Giannouris and Alexia Kammenou, both former NOV players.

=== Notable players ===
==== Men ====
- (Greece) Angelos Vlachopoulos
- (Greece) Dimitrios Nikolaidis
- (Greece) Georgios Afroudakis
- (Greece) Christos Afroudakis
- (Greece) Zachos Afroudakis
- (Greece) Nikos Darras
- (Greece) Ioannis Giannouris
- (Greece) Theodoros Lorantos
- (Greece) Dimitrios Mazis
- (Greece) George Mavrotas
- (Greece) Georgios Psykhos
- (Greece) Georgios Reppas
- (Greece) Vangelis Roupakas
- (Greece) Stefanos Santa
- (Greece) Konstantinos Tsalkanis
- (Australia) Anthony Hrysanthos
- (Serbia) Petar Trbojević

==== Women ====
- (Australia) Rebecca Rippon
- (Greece) Alexandra Asimaki
- (Greece) Alexia Kammenou
- (Greece) Angeliki Gerolymou
- (Greece) Kelina Kantzou
- (Greece) Dina Kouteli
- (Greece) Georgia Lara
- (Greece) Kyriaki Liosi
- (Greece) Antiopi Melidoni
- (Greece) Evangelia Moraitidou
- (Greece) Anthoula Mylonaki
- (Greece) Aikaterini Oikonomopoulou
- (Greece) Antigoni Roumpesi
- (Greece) Christina Tsoukala
- (Spain) Patricia del Soto
- (United States) Heather Petri
- (United States) Moriah van Norman
- (United States) Ashleigh Johnson

=== Notable coaches ===
==== Men ====
- (Greece) Ioannis Giannouris
- (Greece) Theodoros Lorantos
- (Greece) Dimitris Mavrotas
- (Greece) Vangelis Roupakas
- (Spain) Josep Brasco Cata

==== Women ====
- (Greece) Alexia Kammenou
- (Greece) Giorgos Katsoulis
- (Greece) Vangelis Roupakas
- (Greece) Akis Tsatalios

=== Water polo titles ===
- Men:
  - Greek water polo championships (4): 1991, 1997, 1998, 2012
  - Greek water polo cups (4): 1996, 1999, 2012, 2017
  - Double (1): 2012
  - Greek Super Cup (1): 1996
  - LEN Cup Winners' Cup (1): 1997
  - LEN Euro Cup
    - Runners-up (1): 2004
- Women:
  - Greek water polo championships (12): 1991, 1993, 1994, 1997, 2003, 2005, 2006, 2007, 2010, 2012, 2013, 2025
  - Greek water polo cups (1): 2019
  - Women's LEN Champions' Cup (2): 2009, 2010
    - Runners-up (3): 2008, 2012, 2014
  - Women's LEN Trophy (1): 2003
    - Runners-up (3): 2000, 2005, 2016
  - LEN Women's Supercup (2): 2009, 2010

== European honours ==
season	men's water polo	women's water polo
1993-94		LEN Euro League semi-finals
1996-97	LEN Cup Winners' Cup Winners	
1999-00		LEN Trophy Final
2000-01	LEN Euro Cup semi-finals	
2001-02		LEN Trophy 4th place
2002-03		LEN Trophy Winners
2003-04	LEN Euro Cup Final	LEN Euro League semi-finals
2004-05		LEN Trophy Final
2005-06		LEN Euro League semi-finals
2007-08		LEN Euro League Final
2008-09		LEN Euro League Champions
2009-10		LEN Super Cup Super Champions
2009-10		LEN Euro League Champions
2010-11		LEN Super Cup Super Champions
2011-12		LEN Euro League Final
2013-14		LEN Euro League Final
2014-15		LEN Trophy 3rd place
2015-16		LEN Trophy Final
2018-19		LEN Euro League
