= A1 Ethniki Women's Water Polo =

Greek women's water polo championship

- Founded: 1988
- Country: Greece
- Confederation: KOE
- Number of clubs: 12
- Relegation to: A2 Ethniki Women's Water Polo
- International cup: LEN Euro League
- Current champions: Olympiacos SFP (16) (2025–26)
- Most championships: Olympiacos SFP (16)

The Greek Women's Water Polo A1 League (Greek: Ελληνικό Πρωτάθλημα Υδατοσφαίρισης της Α1 Γυναικών) is the premier championship for women's water polo teams in Greece. It was founded in 1988, and it is currently contested by twelve teams. Greek League is ranked as one of the top national domestic leagues in European water polo. The champion, the runner-up and the third-placed team qualify for the LEN Euro League.

The first champion was Ethnikos Piraeus. In the following years until 2008 ANO Glyfada and NO Vouliagmeni dominated. In the next five years, Olympiacos Piraeus and Vouliagmeni were alternating at the top of the championship, but in the last decade Olympiacos Piraeus has been completely dominating.

Only four teams have won the championship so far. Olympiacos Piraeus have won the most championships (16), and are also the current champions.

Greek clubs are among the most successful in European water polo. They have won fifteen titles in all European competitions. The teams have won the LEN Champions' Cup / LEN Euro League seven times, the LEN Super Cup and the LEN Trophy four times each. Concretely, NO Vouliagmeni have won two Champion Cups (2009, 2010), two LEN Super Cups (2009, 2010) and one LEN Trophy (2003), Olympiacos have won three LEN Euro Leagues (2015, 2021, 2022), three LEN Super Cup (2015, 2021, 2022) and one LEN Trophy (2014), ANO Glyfada have won two Champion Cups (2000, 2003), and Ethnikos Piraeus have won two LEN Trophy cups (2010, 2022).

== Champions ==
A Ethniki
Season	Champion
1987–88	Ethnikos Piraeus
1988–89	ANO Glyfada
1989–90	Ethnikos Piraeus
1990–91	NO Vouliagmeni
1991–92	Ethnikos Piraeus
1992–93	NO Vouliagmeni
1993–94	NO Vouliagmeni
1994–95	Olympiacos Piraeus
1995–96	ANO Glyfada
1996–97	NO Vouliagmeni
1997–98	Olympiacos Piraeus

A1 Ethniki
Season	Champion
1998–99	ANO Glyfada
1999–00	ANO Glyfada
2000–01	ANO Glyfada
2001–02	ANO Glyfada
2002–03	NO Vouliagmeni
2003–04	ANO Glyfada
2004–05	NO Vouliagmeni
2005–06	NO Vouliagmeni
2006–07	NO Vouliagmeni
2007–08	ANO Glyfada
2008–09	Olympiacos Piraeus

A1 Ethniki
Season	Champion
2009–10	NO Vouliagmeni
2010–11	Olympiacos Piraeus
2011–12	NO Vouliagmeni
2012–13	NO Vouliagmeni
2013–14	Olympiacos Piraeus
2014–15	Olympiacos Piraeus
2015–16	Olympiacos Piraeus
2016–17	Olympiacos Piraeus
2017–18	Olympiacos Piraeus
2018–19	Olympiacos Piraeus
2019–20	Olympiacos Piraeus

A1 Ethniki
Season	Champion
2020–21	Olympiacos Piraeus
2021–22	Olympiacos Piraeus
2022–23	Olympiacos Piraeus
2023–24	Olympiacos Piraeus
2024–25	NO Vouliagmeni
2025–26	Olympiacos Piraeus

=== Performance by club ===
Club	Titles	Winning years
Olympiacos SF Piraeus	16	1995, 1998, 2009, 2011, 2014, 2015, 2016, 2017, 2018, 2019, 2020, 2021, 2022, 2023, 2024, 2026
NO Vouliagmeni	12	1991, 1993, 1994, 1997, 2003, 2005, 2006, 2007, 2010, 2012, 2013, 2025
ANO Glyfada	8	1989, 1996, 1999, 2000, 2001, 2002, 2004, 2008
Ethnikos O.F. Piraeus	3	1988, 1990, 1992

== Greek clubs in European competitions ==
LEN Women's Euroleague :

Team	European Champion	Runners-up
Olympiacos SF Piraeus	2015, 2021, 2022, 2026	2017, 2019, 2024
NO Vouliagmeni	2009, 2010	2008, 2012, 2014
ANO Glyfada	2000, 2003	2001, 2004

LEN Women's Super Cup :

Team	Super Cup Champion	Runners-up
Olympiacos SF Piraeus	2015, 2021, 2022, 2026	2014
NO Vouliagmeni	2009, 2010	-
Ethnikos O.F. Piraeus	-	2010, 2022

Women's LEN Trophy :

Team	LEN Trophy Winner	Runners-up
Ethnikos O.F. Piraeus	2010, 2022	–
NO Vouliagmeni	2003	2000, 2005, 2016
Olympiacos SF Piraeus	2014	2008, 2018
