= List of LEN women's club competition winners =

The Ligue Européenne de Natation LEN is the governing body for women's Water polo in Europe. It organises Five main Active club competitions : the European Aquatics Champions League (formerly LEN European Cup), the European Aquatics Euro Cup ( Second tier ) the European Aquatics Conference Cup ( Third tier ) the European Challenger Cup ( Fourth tier ), and the European Aquatics Super Cup. The Spanish club CN Sabadell is the most successful one with 12 combined titles in total, followed by Orizzonte Catania from Italy who has secured 11 titles in LEN Women's Europe club competitions.

The Italian clubs have won the most titles (27), ahead of clubs from Greece (16 titles).

== Winners ==
=== By club ===
The following table lists all the women's clubs that have won at least one LEN Europe club competition, and is updated as of May 31, 2026 (in chronological order).

Key

EACL	European Aquatics Champions League
EAEC	European Aquatics Euro Cup
EACO	European Aquatics Conference Cup
EACC	European Aquatics Challenger Cup
EASC	European Aquatics Super Cup

Most in category

List of LEN women's club competition winners
Rk.	Club	Country	EACL	EAEC	EACO	EACC	EASC	Total
1	CN Sabadell	Spain	7				5	12
2	Orizzonte Catania	Italy	8	1			2	11
3	Olympiacos	Greece	3	1			3	7
4	NC Vouliagmeni	Greece	2	1			2	5
5	Kinef Kirishi	Russia	2	1			1	4
=	ZWV Nereus	Netherlands	3	1				4
7	Donk Gouda	Netherlands	3					3
=	SKIF Moscow	Russia	2	1				3
=	RN Imperia	Italy		2			1	3
10	ANO Glyfada	Greece	2					2
=	Ethnikos	Greece		2				2
=	Fiorentina	Italy	1				1	2
=	Pro Recco	Italy	1				1	2
=	CN Sant Andreu	Spain	1				1	2
=	Gifa Palermo	Italy		2				2
=	CC Ortigia	Italy		2				2
=	Racing Roma	Italy		2				2
=	Shturm Ruza	Russia		2				2
=	UVSE	Hungary		2				2
=	Dunaújváros	Hungary		1			1	2
=	Honvéd SE	Hungary		1			1	2
=	Izmir BB GSK	Turkey				2		2
23	Brandenburg	Netherlands	1					1
=	Szentesi VK	Hungary	1					1
=	CN Mataró	Spain		1				1
=	Rapallo	Italy		1				1
=	Plebiscito Padova	Italy		1				1
=	Cosenza Nuoto	Italy			1			1
=	Göztepe S.K.	Turkey				1		1

=== By country ===
The following table lists all the countries whose clubs have won at least one LEN competition, and is updated as of May 31, 2026 (in chronological order).

Key
EACL	European Aquatics Champions League
EAEC	European Aquatics Euro Cup
EACO	European Aquatics Conference Cup
EACC	European Aquatics Challenger Cup
EASC	European Aquatics Super Cup

Most in category

List of LEN women's club competition winners by country
Rk.	Nations	EACL	EAEC	EACO	EACC	EASC	Total
1	Italy	10	11	1		5	27
2	Greece	7	4			5	16
3	Spain	8	1			6	15
4	Russia	4	4			1	9
5	Netherlands	7	1				8
6	Hungary	1	4			2	7
7	Turkey				3		3
