= List of LEN club competition winners =

European Aquatics is the governing body for Water polo in Europe. It organises four main active club competitions: the top tier European Aquatics Champions League (formerly European Cup), the European Aquatics Euro Cup (second tier competition),the European Aquatics Conference Cup (third tier competition), the European Aquatics Challenger Cup (fourth tier competition) and the European Aquatics Super Cup. There is also a former LEN club competition such as the LEN Cup Winners' Cup existed between the years 1974 to 2003. The Italian side Pro Recco have won a record total of 21 titles in European Aquatics Europe club competitions, six more than Ferencváros from Hungary.

The Italian clubs have won the most titles (47), ahead of clubs from Hungary (35).

== Winners ==
=== By club ===
The following table lists all the men's clubs that have won at least one European Aquatics Europe club competition, and is updated as of December 5, 2025 (in chronological order).

Key

EACL	European Aquatics Champions League
EAEC	European Aquatics Euro Cup
EACO	European Aquatics Conference Cup
EACC	European Aquatics Challenger Cup
LCW	LEN Cup Winners' Cup(defunct)
EASC	European Aquatics Super Cup

Most in category

List of European Aquatics club competition winners
Rk.	Club	Country	EACL	EAEC	EACO	EACC	LCW	EASC	Total
1	Pro Recco	Italy	11	1				9	21
2	Ferencváros	Hungary	3	2			4	6	15
3	HAVK Mladost	Croatia	7	1			2	3	13
4	VK Partizan	Serbia	7	1			1	2	11
5	Jug Dubrovnik	Croatia	4	2				2	8
6	CN Posillipo	Italy	3	1			2	1	7
=	Waterpolis Pescara	Italy	1	1			3	2	7
8	Spandau 04	Germany	4					2	6
=	Vasas SC	Hungary	2	1			3		6
=	CSK VMF Moscow	Russia	1				2	3	6
11	Újpest	Hungary	1	3				1	5
12	CN Catalunya	Spain	1				1	2	4
=	POŠK	Croatia	1				2	1	4
=	CN Barcelona	Spain	1	2				1	4
=	AN Brescia	Italy		4					4
16	Olympiacos	Greece	2					1	3
=	OSC Budapest	Hungary	2					1	3
=	Szolnok SC	Hungary	1	1				1	3
=	RN Savona	Italy		3					3
=	Dynamo Moscow	Russia					2	1	3
21	Jadran Split	Croatia	2						2
=	Honvéd SE	Hungary	1					1	2
=	Primorac Kotor	Montenegro	1					1	2
=	MGU Moscow	Russia	1				1		2
=	Crvena zvezda	Serbia	1					1	2
=	Barceloneta	Spain	1					1	2
=	Racing Roma	Italy		1			1		2
=	Galatasaray	Turkey				2			2
29	Canottieri Napoli	Italy	1						1
=	VK Bečej	Yugoslavia	1						1
=	Sintez Kazan	Russia		1					1
=	Szeged	Hungary		1					1
=	Shturm Chekhov	Russia		1					1
=	Cattaro	Montenegro		1					1
=	Radnički Kragujevac	Serbia		1					1
=	Spartak Volgograd	Russia		1					1
=	CN Sabadell	Spain		1					1
=	CN Marseille	France		1					1
=	GS Apollon Smyrnis	Greece				1			1
=	GZC Donk	Netherlands				1			1
=	RN Florentia	Italy					1		1
=	Korčulanski PK	Yugoslavia					1		1
=	VK Mornar	Yugoslavia					1		1
=	RN Arenzano	Italy					1		1
=	NC Vouliagmeni	Greece					1		1

=== By country ===
The following table lists all the countries whose clubs have won at least one European Aquatics competition, and is updated as of December 5, 2025 (in chronological order).

Key
EACL	European Aquatics Champions League
EAEC	European Aquatics Euro Cup
EACO	European Aquatics Conference Cup
EACC	European Aquatics Challenger Cup
LCW	LEN Cup Winners' Cup (defunct)
EASC	European Aquatics Super Cup

Most in category

List of European Aquatics club competition winners by country
Rk.	Nations (Note: Historical nation's achievements are acounted alone and not to be combined with other modern era flag.)	EACL	EAEC	EACO	EACC	LCW	EASC	Total
1	Italy	16	11			8	12	47
2	Hungary	10	8			7	10	35
3	Yugoslavia	13				6	3	22
4	Croatia	7	3			1	3	14
5	Spain	3	3			1	4	11
6	Soviet Union	2				4	4	10
7	Germany (Note: Germany is the Official inheritor of West Germany records)	4					2	6
=	Serbia	2	1				3	6
9	Greece	2			1	1	1	5
10	Russia		3			1		4
11	Montenegro	1	1				1	3
12	Turkey				2			2
13	Serbia and Montenegro		1					1
=	France		1					1
=	Netherlands				1			1
