= 2010–11 Women's LEN Trophy =

Water polo tournament

The 2010-11 Women's LEN Trophy was the 12th edition of the second tier of LEN's international competitions for women's water polo clubs. Twenty teams from eleven countries took part in the competition, which ran from 10 December 2010 to 20 April 2011.

ASD Rapallo Nuoto defeated Het Ravijn in the final, overcoming a 7-goals loss in the first leg, to win the competition. Szentesi VK and SKIF Izmaylovo also reached the semifinals. It was the seventh time the trophy went to Italy, with Rapallo Nuoto becoming the fourth Italian team to win the competition after Gifa Palermo, CC Ortigia and ASD Roma.

== Federation team allocation ==
Each national federation can enter up to two teams into the LEN Trophy.

=== Distribution ===
	Teams entering in this round	Teams advancing from previous round
Qualifying Round	1 or 2 teams from each federation	
Preliminary Round (16 teams)	4 nations represented by the best-placed teams from the previous year's competition; These were Greece (2), Netherlands, and Russia	4 tournament winners from the qualifying round; 4 tournament runners-up from the qualifying round; 4 tournament third-placed teams from the qualifying round
Knockout Phase (8 teams)		4 tournament winners from the preliminary round; 4 tournament runners-up from the preliminary round

=== Teams ===
Pot	Qualifying round			
	Group A	Group B	Group C	Group D
Pot 1	(Spain) Zaragoza	(Russia) Uralochka Zlatoust	(Russia) SKIF Izmaylovo	(Netherlands) Leiden
Pot 2	(Italy) Imperia	(Germany) Hannoverscher	(Italy) Rapallo Nuoto	(Spain) Dos Hermanas
Pot 3	(France) Union St. Bruno	(Serbia) Vračar	(France) Lille	(Serbia) Taš-2000 Belgrade
Pot 4	(United Kingdom) West London Penguins	(Sweden) Järfälla	(United Kingdom) City of Liverpool	(Hungary) Szentesi
Preliminary Round
	(Greece) Patron	(Greece) Iraklis	(Netherlands) Het Ravijn	(Russia) Yugra Khanty-Mansiysk

== Qualification round ==
=== Group A ===
#	Team	Pld	W	D	L	GF	GA	Pt
1	(Italy) Imperia (host)	3	3	0	0	45	7	9
2	(Spain) Zaragoza	3	2	0	1	32	24	6
3	(England) West London Penguin	3	1	0	2	27	38	3
4	(France) Union St. Bruno	3	0	0	3	8	43	0

10 December 2010
Zaragoza	19–11	West London Penguin
West London Penguin	21–0	Union St. Bruno
11 December 2010
West London Penguin	12–6	Union St. Bruno
Imperia	11–3	Zaragoza
12 December 2010
Zaragoza	10–2	Union St. Bruno
Imperia	13–4	West London Penguin

=== Group B ===
#	Team	Pld	W	D	L	GF	GA	Pt
1	(Russia) Uralochka Zlatoust	3	3	0	0	89	19	9
2	(Germany) Hannoverscher SV (host)	3	2	0	1	45	36	6
3	(Serbia) Vračar	3	1	0	2	27	38	3
4	(Sweden) Järfäll	3	0	0	3	16	54	0

10 December 2010
Uralochka Zlatoust	32–2	Vračar
Hannover	16–8	Järfälla
11 December 2010
Uralochka Zlatoust	35–5	Järfälla
Hannover	17–6	Vračar
12 December 2010
Vračar	11–7	Järfälla
Uralochka Zlatoust	22–12	Hannover

=== Group C ===
#	Team	Pld	W	D	L	GF	GA	Pt
1	(Italy) Rapallo Nuoto (host)	3	3	0	0	41	15	9
2	(Russia) SKIF Izmaylovo	3	2	0	1	52	21	6
3	(England) City of Liverpool	3	1	0	2	22	41	3
4	(France) Lille	3	0	0	3	16	54	0

10 December 2010
SKIF Izmaylovo	25–3	Lille
Rapallo Nuoto	15–1	City of Liverpool
11 December 2010
Rapallo Nuoto	10–7	SKIF Izmaylovo
City of Liverpool	13–6	Lille
12 December 2010
Rapallo Nuoto	16–7	Lille
SKIF Izmaylovo	20–8	City of Liverpool

=== Group D ===
#	Team	Pld	W	D	L	GF	GA	Pt
1	(Netherlands) Leiden	3	3	0	0	31	18	9
2	(Hungary) Szentesi	3	2	0	1	30	15	6
3	(Spain) Dos Hermanas	3	1	0	2	17	17	3
4	(Serbia) Taš-2000 Belgrade (host)	3	0	0	3	15	31	0

10 December
Szentesi	13–2	Taš-2000 Belgrade
Leiden	11–6	Dos Hermanas
11 December
Leiden	10–6	Szentesi
Dos Hermanas	8–7	Taš-2000 Belgrade
12 December
Leiden	10–6	Taš-2000 Belgrade
Szentesi	11–3	Dos Hermanas

== Preliminary round ==
=== Group A ===
#	Team	Pld	W	D	L	GF	GA	Pt
1	(Russia) SKIF Izmaylovo	3	2	1	0	50	21	7
2	(Netherlands) Het Ravijn (host)	3	2	1	0	46	18	7
3	(Italy) Rapallo Nuoto	3	1	0	2	29	20	3
4	(Serbia) Vračar	3	0	0	3	6	72	0

21 January 2011
SKIF Izmaylovo	28–1	Vračar
Het Ravijn	7–4	Imperia
22 January 2011
SKIF Izmaylovo	10–8	Imperia
Het Ravijn	27–2	Vračar
23 January 2011
SKIF Izmaylovo	12–12	Het Ravijn
Imperia	17–3	Vračar

=== Group B ===
#	Team	Pld	W	D	L	GF	GA	Pt
1	(Italy) Rapallo Nuoto	3	3	0	0	59	18	9
2	(Greece) Patron (host)	3	2	0	1	40	34	6
3	(Germany) Hannoverscher SV	3	1	0	2	28	47	3
4	(Spain) Dos Hermanas	3	0	0	3	17	45	0

21 January 2011
Rapallo Nuoto	20–6	Hannover
Patron	14–4	Dos Hermanas
22 January 2011
Rapallo Nuoto	21–4	Dos Hermanas
Patron	18–12	Hannover
23 January 2011
Rapallo Nuoto	18–8	Patron
Hannover	10–9	Dos Hermanas

=== Group C ===
#	Team	Pld	W	D	L	GF	GA	Pt
1	(Russia) Uralochka Zlatoust	3	3	0	0	45	26	9
2	(Greece) Iraklis	3	1	1	1	36	30	4
3	(Spain) Zaragoza (host)	3	1	1	1	29	31	4
4	(England) City of Liverpool	3	0	0	3	21	44	0

21 January 2011
Iraklis	17–7	City of Liverpool
Uralochka Zlatoust	14–10	Zaragoza
22 January 2011
Uralochka Zlatoust	14–10	Iraklis
Zaragoza	10–8	City of Liverpool
23 January 2011
Uralochka Zlatoust	17–6	City of Liverpool
Iraklis	9–9	Zaragoza

=== Group D ===
#	Team	Pld	W	D	L	GF	GA	Pt
1	(Hungary) Szentesi (host)	3	3	0	0	38	21	9
2	(Netherlands) Leiden	3	2	0	1	36	22	6
3	(Russia) Yugra Khanty-Mansiysk	3	1	0	2	43	23	3
4	(England) West London Penguin	3	0	0	3	8	59	0

21 January 2011
Szentesi	15–3	West London Penguin
Leiden	9–8	Yugra Khanty-Mansiysk
22 January 2011
Szentesi	11–8	Leiden
Yugra Khanty-Mansiysk	25–2	West London Penguin
23 January 2011
Szentesi	12–10	Yugra Khanty-Mansiysk
Leiden	19–3	West London Penguin

== Quarter-finals ==
Team #1	Agg.	Team #2	L #1	L #2
Het Ravijn (Netherlands)	24–22	(Russia) Uralochka Zlatoust	14–8	10–14
Iraklis (Greece)	22–32	(Russia) SKIF Izmaylovo	9–13	13–19
Szentesi (Hungary)	28–27	(Greece) Patron	15–12	13–15
Rapallo Nuoto (Italy)	20–18	(Netherlands) Leiden	13–8	7–10

== Semifinals ==
Team #1	Agg.	Team #2	L #1	L #2
Het Ravijn (Netherlands)	18–13	(Russia) SKIF Izmaylovo	12–5	6–8
Szentesi (Hungary)	22–32	(Italy) Rapallo Nuoto	7–5	5–8

== Final ==
Team #1	Agg.	Team #2	L #1	L #2
Het Ravijn (Netherlands)	15–17	(Italy) Rapallo Nuoto	12–5	3–12
