= European Aquatics Women's Super Cup =

Water polo competition

- Current season, competition or edition: 2026 European Aquatics Women's Super Cup
- Sport: Water polo
- Founded: 2006
- President: Patrice Coste
- No. of teams: 2
- Country: European Aquatics members
- Continent: Europe
- Most recent champions: (Greece) Olympiacos (4th title)
- Most titles: (Spain) Sabadell (5 titles)
- Related competitions: LEN Women's Champions League; LEN Women's Euro Cup
- Website: len.eu

The European Aquatics Women's Super Cup is an annual water polo match organized by the LEN and contested by the reigning champions of the two European club competitions, the Euro League and the LEN Trophy.

From 2024, after LEN was renamed to European Aquatics, the new name is the European Aquatics Women's Super Cup.

== Title holders ==
- 2006: (Hungary) Honvéd
- 2007: (Italy) Fiorentina
- 2008: (Italy) Orizzonte Catania
- 2009: (Greece) Vouliagmeni
- 2010: (Greece) Vouliagmeni
- 2011: (Italy) Pro Recco
- 2012: (Italy) Imperia
- 2013: (Spain) Sabadell
- 2014: (Spain) Sabadell
- 2015: (Greece) Olympiacos Piraeus
- 2016: (Spain) Sabadell
- 2017: (Russia) Kinef Kirishi
- 2018: (Hungary) Dunaújváros
- 2019: (Italy) Orizzonte Catania
- 2020: Cancelled due to COVID-19 pandemic
- 2021: (Greece) Olympiacos Piraeus
- 2022: (Greece) Olympiacos Piraeus
- 2023: (Spain) Sabadell
- 2024: (Spain) Sabadell
- 2025: (Spain) Sant Andreu
- 2026: (Greece) Olympiacos Piraeus

== Finals ==
Winner of Champions League
Winner of Euro Cup

Year	Host city	Champion	Runner-up	Score
2006; Details	Budapest	(Hungary) Honvéd	(Italy) Orizzonte Catania	9–8
2007; Details	Florence	(Italy) Fiorentina	(Italy) Roma	10–8
2008; Details	Rome	(Italy) Orizzonte Catania	(Italy) Roma	16–8
2009; Details	Athens	(Greece) Vouliagmeni	(Russia) Shturm Chekhov	11–6
2010; Details	Piraeus	(Greece) Vouliagmeni	(Greece) Ethnikos	13–5
2011; Details	Sori	(Italy) Pro Recco	(Spain) Sabadell	9–8
2012; Details	Imperia	(Italy) Imperia	(Italy) Rapallo	10–7
2013; Details	Moscow	(Spain) Sabadell	(Russia) SKIF Izmailovo	10–9
2014; Details	Barcelona	(Spain) Sabadell	(Greece) Olympiacos Piraeus	9–8
2015; Details	Piraeus	(Greece) Olympiacos Piraeus	(Italy) Plebiscito Padova	10–6
2016; Details	Barcelona	(Spain) Sabadell	(Spain) Mataró	10–9
2017; Details	Budapest	(Russia) Kinef Kirishi	(Hungary) UVSE	10–6
2018; Details	Kirishi	(Hungary) Dunaújváros	(Russia) Kinef Kirishi	15–13
2019; Details	Sabadell	(Italy) Orizzonte Catania	(Spain) Astrapool Sabadell	13–11
2020	Not held due to COVID-19 pandemic			
2021; Details	Piraeus	(Greece) Olympiacos Piraeus	(Russia) Kinef Kirishi	14–11
2022; Details	Piraeus	(Greece) Olympiacos Piraeus	(Greece) Ethnikos Piraeus	11–4
2023; Details	Budapest	(Spain) Sabadell	(Hungary) UVSE	14–11
2024; Details	Sabadell	(Spain) Sabadell	(Italy) Plebiscito Padova	19–7
2025; Details	Barcelona	(Spain) Sant Andreu	(Netherlands) ZV De Zaan	17–10
2026; Details	Piraeus	(Greece) Olympiacos Piraeus	(Spain) CN Catalunya	18–4

Source: LEN (from 2006 to 2016).

== Titles by club ==
Rank	Club	Titles	Runner-up	Champion Years
1.	(Spain) Sabadell	5	2	2013, 2014, 2016, 2023, 2024
2.	(Greece) Olympiacos Piraeus	4	1	2015, 2021, 2022, 2026
3.	(Italy) Orizzonte Catania	2	1	2008, 2019
4.	(Greece) Vouliagmeni	2		2009, 2010
5.	(Russia) Kinef Kirishi	1	2	2017
6.	(Hungary) Honvéd	1		2006
7.	(Italy) Fiorentina	1		2007
	(Italy) Pro Recco	1		2011
	(Italy) Imperia	1		2012
	(Hungary) Dunaújváros	1		2018
	(Spain) Sant Andreu	1		2025
12.	(Italy) Racing Roma		2
	(Greece) Ethnikos		2
	(Italy) Plebiscito Padova		2
	(Hungary) UVSE		2
16.	(Russia) Shturm 2002		1
	(Italy) Rapallo		1
	(Russia) SKIF Izmailovo		1
	(Spain) Mataró		1
	(Netherlands) ZV De Zaan		1
	(Spain) CN Catalunya		1

== Titles by nation ==
Rank	Country	Titles	Runners-up
1.	Spain	6	4
2.	Greece	6	3
3.	Italy	5	6
4.	Hungary	2	2
5.	Russia	1	4
6.	Netherlands		1

== See also ==
=== Men ===
- European Aquatics Champions League
- European Aquatics Euro Cup
- European Aquatics Conference Cup
- European Aquatics Challenger Cup
- European Aquatics Super Cup

=== Women ===
- European Aquatics Women's Champions League
- European Aquatics Women's Euro Cup
- European Aquatics Women's Conference Cup
- European Aquatics Women's Challenger Cup
