= 2012–13 Women's LEN Trophy =

Water polo tournament

The 2012–13 Women's LEN Trophy will be the fourteenth edition of LEN's second-tier competition for women's water polo clubs. It will be contested by thirteen teams from eight countries. The group stage was played between 22 – 25 November 2012.

== Group stage ==
=== Group Α ===
#	Team	Pld	W	D	L	GF	GA	Pt
1	(Russia) Shturm Ruza	6	6	0	0	115	31	18
2	(Netherlands) Leiden	6	5	0	1	84	49	15
3	(Greece) Iraklis Thessaloniki	6	4	0	2	72	55	12
4	(France) Lille	6	3	0	3	53	55	9
5	(Spain) Dos Hermanas (host)	6	2	0	4	37	68	6
6	(Turkey) Galatasaray	6	0	1	5	36	84	1
7	(England) London Otter	6	0	1	5	31	86	1

=== Group Β ===
#	Team	Pld	W	D	L	GF	GA	Pt
1	(Russia) Uralochka Zlatoust	5	4	0	1	75	30	12
2	(Russia) SKIF Izmailovo	5	3	1	1	57	35	10
3	(Netherlands) Donk Gouda	5	3	1	1	61	40	10
4	(Italy) Orizzonte Catania	5	3	0	2	67	44	9
5	(England) Liverpool Lizards	5	1	0	4	22	63	3
6	(France) Union Saint-Bruno (host)	5	0	0	5	22	92	0

== Quarter-finals ==
Team #1	Agg.	Team #2	L #1	L #2
Orizzonte Catania (Italy)	20–30	(Russia) Shturm Ruza	11–15	9–15
Lille (France)	15–24	(Russia) Uralochka Zlatoust	12–19	3–5
Donk Gouda (Netherlands)	24–19	(Netherlands) Leiden	9–9	15–10
Iraklis Thessaloniki (Greece)	16–22	(Russia) SKIF Izmailovo	8–9	8–13

== Semifinals ==
Team #1	Agg.	Team #2	L #1	L #2
Uralochka Zlatoust (Russia)	17–25	(Russia) Shturm Ruza	9–15	8–10
Donk Gouda (Netherlands)	27–29	(Russia) SKIF Izmailovo	15–16	12–13

== Final ==
Team #1	Agg.	Team #2	L #1	L #2
SKIF Izmailovo (Russia)	21–31	(Russia) Shturm Ruza	10–17	11–14
