= 2017–18 LEN Euro Cup =

2017−18 LEN Euro Cup
- League: LEN Euro Cup
- Sport: Water Polo
- Duration: 27 September 2017 to 18 April 2018
- Teams: 17
- Finals champions: (Hungary) Ferencváros (2nd title)
- Runners-up: (Italy) Banco BPM SM Busto

Euro Cup seasons
- ← 2016–17 2018−19 →

The 2017–18 LEN Euro Cup was the second tier of European competition in water polo. It ran from 27 September 2017 to 18 April 2018.

== Overview ==
=== Team allocation ===
Qualification round I
(Croatia) Jadran Split	(Germany) WS Hannover	(Italy) SM Verona	(Russia) Shturm 2002
(France) Montpellier	(Hungary) Ferencvárosi TC	(Montenegro) Primorac Kotor	(Spain) CN Mataró
(France) Pays D’Aix Natation	(Hungary) Miskolci VLC	(Netherlands) ZPC Amersfoort	(Slovakia) Hornets Košice
(Germany) OSC Potsdam			
Quarter-finals
(France) CN Marseille (CL Q3)	(Russia) Spartak Volgograd (CL Q3)	(Russia) Sintez Kazan (CL Q3)	(Serbia) Crvena zvezda (CL Q3)

=== Phases and rounds dates ===
The schedule of the competition is as follows.

Phase	Round	First leg	Second leg
Qualifying	Qualification round I	27 September–1 October 2017	
Qualifying	Qualification round II	13–15 October 2017	
Knockout stage	Quarter-finals	8 November 2017	9 December 2017
Knockout stage	Semi-finals	24 January 2018	28 February 2018
Knockout stage	Final	31 March 2018	18 April 2018

== Qualifying rounds ==
=== Qualification round I ===
==== Group A ====
Pos	Team	Pld	W	D	L	GF	GA	GD	Pts	Qualification	(Hungary) MIS	(Montenegro) PRI	(Russia) SHT	(Spain) MAT	(Slovakia) KOS	(Germany) WSH
1	(Hungary) Miskolci VLC (H)	5	5	0	0	76	31	+45	15	Round II	—		16–6		15–7	18–4
2	(Montenegro) Primorac Kotor	5	3	1	1	53	48	+5	10	Round II	6–14	—		12–8		
3	(Russia) Shturm 2002	5	3	1	1	53	52	+1	10	Round II		9–9	—			11–5
4	(Spain) CN Mataró	5	2	0	3	53	53	0	6	Round II	8–13		13–14	—		
5	(Slovakia) Hornets Košice	5	1	0	4	49	60	−11	3			10–12	9–13	10–11	—	
6	(Germany) WS Hannover	5	0	0	5	29	69	−40	0			7–14		4–13	9–13	—

Source: LEN
(H) Hosts

==== Group B ====
Pos	Team	Pld	W	D	L	GF	GA	GD	Pts	Qualification	(Hungary) FTC	(Italy) VER	(Croatia) JAD	(France) PAY	(France) MON	(Netherlands) AME	(Germany) POT
1	(Hungary) Ferencvárosi TC	6	6	0	0	107	37	+70	18	Round II	—	11–9				25–4	
2	(Italy) SM Verona (H)	6	4	1	1	93	41	+52	13	Round II		—	11–11		19–5		17–6
3	(Croatia) Jadran Split	6	4	1	1	77	43	+34	13	Round II	5–8		—		16–6	15–6	
4	(France) Pays D’Aix Natation	6	3	0	3	70	61	+9	9	Round II	10–18	4–13	5–9	—		18–7	
5	(France) Montpellier	6	2	0	4	55	91	−36	6		7–23			9–14	—		13–10
6	(Netherlands) ZPC Amersfoort	6	1	0	5	40	105	−65	3			4–24			9–15	—	
7	(Germany) OSC Potsdam	6	0	0	6	38	102	−64	0		2–22		7–21	5–19		8–10	—

Source: LEN
(H) Hosts

=== Qualification round II ===
==== Group C ====
Pos	Team	Pld	W	D	L	GF	GA	GD	Pts	Qualification	(Italy) VER	(Hungary) MIS	(France) PAY	(Russia) SHT
1	(Italy) SM Verona	3	2	1	0	41	23	+18	7	Quarter-finals	—			16–5
2	(Hungary) Miskolci VLC	3	1	2	0	35	33	+2	5	Quarter-finals	11–11	—		
3	(France) Pays D’Aix Natation (H)	3	1	1	1	31	37	−6	4		7–14	13–13	—	11–10
4	(Russia) Shturm 2002	3	0	0	3	24	38	−14	0			9–11		—

Source: LEN
(H) Hosts

==== Group D ====
Pos	Team	Pld	W	D	L	GF	GA	GD	Pts	Qualification	(Hungary) FTC	(Croatia) JAD	(Spain) MAT	(Montenegro) PRI
1	(Hungary) Ferencvárosi TC (H)	3	3	0	0	41	17	+24	9	Quarter-finals	—	17–3	11–4	13–10
2	(Croatia) Jadran Split	3	1	1	1	28	34	−6	4	Quarter-finals		—	8–8	
3	(Spain) CN Mataró	3	1	1	1	21	27	−6	4				—	9–8
4	(Montenegro) Primorac Kotor	3	0	0	3	27	39	−12	0			9–17		—

Source: LEN
(H) Hosts

== Knockout stage ==
=== Bracket ===
Quarter-finals
(Russia) Sintez Kazan	8	9	17
(Hungary) Ferencváros	16	12	28
(Hungary) Miskolc	12	7	19
(Russia) Spartak Volgograd	8	10	18
(Croatia) Jadran Split	10	5	15
(France) CN Marseille	11	7	18
(Serbia) Crvena zvezda	5	8	13
(Italy) Banco BPM SM Busto	10	15	25

Semi-finals
(Hungary) Ferencváros	13	13	26
(Hungary) Miskolc	9	8	17
(France) CN Marseille	9	10	19
(Italy) Banco BPM SM Busto	11	11	22

Final
(Hungary) Ferencváros	9	8	17
(Italy) Banco BPM SM Busto	8	5	13

=== Quarter-finals ===
Team 1	Agg.	Team 2	1st leg	2nd leg
Sintez Kazan (Russia)	17–28	(Hungary) Ferencváros	8–16	9–12
Jadran Split (Croatia)	15–18	(France) CN Marseille	10–11	5–7
Crvena zvezda (Serbia)	13–25	(Italy) Banco BPM SM Busto	5–10	8–15
Miskolc (Hungary)	19–18	(Russia) Spartak Volgograd	12–8	7–10

=== Semi-finals ===
Team 1	Agg.	Team 2	1st leg	2nd leg
Ferencváros (Hungary)	26–17	(Hungary) Miskolc	13–9	13–8
CN Marseille (France)	19–22	(Italy) Banco BPM SM Busto	9–11	10–11

=== Final ===
Team 1	Agg.	Team 2	1st leg	2nd leg
Ferencváros (Hungary)	17–13	(Italy) Banco BPM SM Busto	9–8	8–5

2017–18 LEN Euro Cup
Champions

Ferencvárosi TC
2nd Cup

== See also ==
- 2017–18 LEN Champions League
