= 2005–06 LEN Trophy =

- League: LEN Trophy
- Sport: Water Polo
- Duration: 2005 to 2006
- Finals champions: (Italy) Leonessa (3rd title)
- Runners-up: (Russia) Sintez Kazan

LEN Trophy seasons
- ← 2004–05 2006–07 →

The 2005–06 LEN Trophy was the 14th edition of LEN's second-tier competition for men's water polo clubs.

== Knockout stage ==
=== Eight Finals ===
Team 1	Agg.	Team 2	1st leg	2nd leg
Eger (Hungary)	20–17	(Russia) Spartak Volgograd	12–8	8–9
Szeged (Hungary)	7–18	(Russia) Dynamo Moscow	4–8	3–10
Ferencváros (Hungary)	22–21	(Germany) ASC Duisburg	10–7	12–14
Sintez Kazan (Russia)	24–13	(Turkey) Galatasaray	17–7	7–6
Primorac Kotor (Serbia and Montenegro)	20–21	(Greece) Panionios	11–8	9–13 (a.e.t.)
Bissolati Cremona (Italy)	24–16	(France) Olympic Nice	14–5	10–11
Aix-les-Bains (France)	19–30	(Croatia) Jadran Split	9–16	10–14
Cannstatt (Germany)	16–22	(Italy) Leonessa	6–11	10–11

=== Quarter-finals ===
Team 1	Agg.	Team 2	1st leg	2nd leg
Panionios (Greece)	14–16	(Hungary) Ferencváros	10–8	4–8
Leonessa (Italy)	18–17	(Hungary) Eger	10–7	8–10
Bissolati Cremona (Italy)	16–17	(Russia) Dynamo Moscow	9–8	7–9
Jadran Split (Croatia)	15–19	(Russia) Sintez Kazan	11–8	4–11

=== Semi-finals ===
Team 1	Agg.	Team 2	1st leg	2nd leg
Sintez Kazan (Russia)	22–15	(Hungary) Ferencváros	12–6	10–9
Leonessa (Italy)	19–18	(Russia) Dynamo Moscow	8–11	11–7

=== Final ===
Team 1	Agg.	Team 2	1st leg	2nd leg
Leonessa (Italy)	17–15	(Russia) Sintez Kazan	11–8	6–7 (a.e.t.)

2005–06 LEN Trophy
Champions

Leonessa
3rd Cup

== See also ==
- 2005–06 LEN Euroleague
