= 2013 Women's LEN Super Cup =

Water polo match

The 2013 Women's LEN Super Cup was the 8th edition of the Women's LEN Super Cup an annual water polo match organized by the LEN and contested by the reigning champions of the two main European club competitions.

The match was played between the Euro League Champion (CN Sabadell) and the LEN Trophy Runners-up (SKIF Izmailovo) in Moscow on December 7, 2013.

== Match ==
Time is MSK (UTC+3).

7 December 2013; 17:00	SKIF-CSP Izmailovo	9–10	CN Sabadell	Moscow, Russia; Referees: Marcela Mauss (GER), Nnad Golijanin (SRB)
7 December 2013; 17:00	Score by quarters: 2–4, 3–2, 2–3, 2–1			Moscow, Russia; Referees: Marcela Mauss (GER), Nnad Golijanin (SRB)
7 December 2013; 17:00	Troshkina 3 Borisova 2 Antonova, Bakhrameeva, Bogdanova, Grineva 1	Goals	Seidemann 3 Pareja, Forca 2 Ortiz, García, Doménech 1	Moscow, Russia; Referees: Marcela Mauss (GER), Nnad Golijanin (SRB)

== Squads ==
=== CN Sabadell Astralpool ===
No.	Name	Date of birth	Position
1	(Spain) Laura Ester	January 22, 1990	Goalkeeper
2	(Spain) Matilde Ortiz	September 16, 1990	Centre back
3	(Spain) Anni Espar	January 8, 1993	Driver
4	(Spain) Noelia Mora	October 3, 1995	All field player
5	(Hungary) Gabriela Szűcs	March 7, 1988	Driver
6	(Spain) Jennifer Pareja	May 8, 1984	Driver
7	(Spain) Carla Abellán	July 31, 1997	All field player
8	(Spain) Maica Garcia	October 17, 1990	Centre forward
9	(Spain) María del Pilar Peña	April 4, 1986	All field player
10	(United States) Melissa Seidemann	June 26, 1990	Centre forward
11	(Spain) Olga Doménech	September 21, 1988	Wing
12	(Spain) Judith Forca	June 7, 1996	Wing
13	(Spain) Cristina Terrado	September 9, 1997	Goalkeeper

Head coach: Ignasi Guiu
