= 2011–12 Women's LEN Trophy =

Water polo tournament

The 2011–12 Women's LEN Trophy was the 13th edition of the competition. RN Imperia defeated Yugra Khanty-Mansiysk in the final by overcoming a home loss to become the fifth Italian club to win it.

== Qualification round ==
=== Group A ===
#	Team	Pld	W	D	L	GF	GA	Pt
1	(Greece) Olympiacos	4	4	0	0	87	21	12
2	(Russia) Uralochka Zlatoust (host)	4	3	0	1	111	25	9
3	(France) Lille	4	2	0	2	28	46	6
4	(Germany) Hannoverscher SV	4	1	0	3	32	92	3
5	(Sweden) Järfälla	4	0	0	4	19	91	0

- Olympiacos 28–6 Hannover, Uralochka 37–1 Järfälla
- Uralochka 46–8 Hannover, Lille 11–3 Järfälla
- Olympiacos 11–7 Lille, Hannover 13–12 Järfälla
- Olympiacos 30–1 Järfälla, Uralochka 21–4 Lille
- Olympiacos 12–7 Uralochka, Lille 6–5 Hannover

=== Group B ===
#	Team	Pld	W	D	L	GF	GA	Pt
1	(Russia) Yugra Khanty-Mansiysk	4	4	0	0	98	15	12
2	(Italy) Imperia (host)	4	3	0	1	72	83	9
3	(Serbia) Senta	4	2	0	2	30	76	6
4	(France) Union St. Bruno	4	1	0	3	25	66	3
5	(England) West London Penguin	4	0	0	4	22	75	0

- Yugra 27–1 St. Bruno, Imperia 22–3 Senta
- Imperia 20–3 St. Bruno, Senta 10–7 Penguin
- Yugra 34–6 Senta, Imperia 24–6 Penguin
- Yugra 7–6 Imperia, St. Bruno 11–8 Penguin
- Yugra 30–1 Penguin, Senta 11–10 St. Bruno

=== Group C ===
#	Team	Pld	W	D	L	GF	GA	Pt
1	(Italy) Plebiscito Padova	4	4	0	0	68	20	12
2	(Spain) Zaragoza	4	3	0	1	43	32	9
3	(Greece) Patras (host)	4	2	0	2	51	32	6
4	(England) London Otter	4	1	0	3	15	52	3
5	(Israel) Hapoel Petah Tikva	4	0	0	4	21	60	0

- Plebiscito 16–8 Zaragoza, Patras 16–3 Otter
- Zaragoza 16–5 Hapoel, Patras 20–8 Hapoel
- Zaragoza 7–2 Otter, Zaragoza 12–9 Patras
- Plebiscito 24–3 Otter, Plebiscito 19–3 Hapoel
- Plebiscito 9–6 Patras, Otter 7–5 Hapoel

== Preliminary round ==
=== Group A ===
#	Team	Pld	W	D	L	GF	GA	Pt
1	(Russia) Yugra Khanty-Mansiysk (ht.)	2	2	0	0	26	18	6
2	(Italy) Fiorentina	2	1	0	1	22	18	3
3	(Spain) Zaragoza	2	0	0	2	17	29	0

- Fiorentina 14–7 Zaragoza
- Yugra 15–10 Zaragoza
- Yugra 11–8 Fiorentina
- Hannoverscher SV withdrew from competition

=== Group B ===
#	Team	Pld	W	D	L	GF	GA	Pt
1	(Hungary) Szentesi (host)	3	3	0	0	46	17	9
2	(Russia) Uralochka Zlatoust	3	2	0	1	46	14	3
3	(Greece) NU Patras	3	1	0	2	26	39	3
4	(Serbia) Senta	3	0	0	3	14	62	0

- Szentesi 25–5 Senta, Uralochka 16–7 Patras
- Szentesi 15–7 Patras, Uralochka 25–1 Senta
- Szentesi 6–5 Uralochka, Patras 12–8 Senta

=== Group C ===
#	Team	Pld	W	D	L	GF	GA	Pt
1	(Greece) Olympiacos	3	2	1	0	55	22	7
2	(Italy) Imperia (host)	3	2	0	1	43	21	6
3	(Russia) SKIF Izmaylovo	3	1	1	1	58	26	4
4	(England) London Otter	3	0	0	3	6	93	0

- Olympiacos 12–12 SKIF, Imperia 23–2 Otter
- Olympiacos 33–1 Otter, Imperia 11–9 SKIF
- Olympiacos 10–9 Imperia, SKIF 37–3 Otter

=== Group D ===
#	Team	Pld	W	D	L	GF	GA	Pt
1	(Italy) Plebiscito Padova (host)	3	3	0	0	43	13	9
2	(Netherlands) Leiden	3	2	0	1	43	19	6
3	(France) Lille	3	1	0	2	22	34	3
4	(France) Union St. Bruno	3	0	0	3	15	56	0

- Plebiscito 22–2 St. Bruno, Leiden 14–6 Lille
- Plebiscito 10–8 Leiden, Lille 13–10 St. Bruno
- Plebiscito 11–3 Lille, Leiden 21–3 St. Bruno

== Quarter-finals ==
Team #1	Agg.	Team #2	L #1	L #2
Leiden (Netherlands)	16–18	(Hungary) Szentesi	9–9	7–9
Imperia (Italy)	14–13	(Italy) Plebiscito Padova	6–6	8–7
Olympiacos (Greece)	23–12	(Italy) Fiorentina	11–7	12–5
Yugra Khanty-Mansiysk (Russia)	25–19	(Russia) Uralochka Zlatoust	14–10	11–9

== Semifinals ==
Team #1	Agg.	Team #2	L #1	L #2
Imperia (Italy)	22–18	(Hungary) Szentesi	11–8	11–10
Olympiacos (Greece)	17–19	(Russia) Yugra Khanty Mansiysk	9–8	8–11

== Final ==
Team #1	Agg.	Team #2	L #1	L #2
Imperia (Italy)	19–18	(Russia) Yugra Khanty-Mansiysk	12–13	7–5
