= European Aquatics Super Cup =

Water polo competition

LEN Super Cup
- Current season, competition or edition: 2025 European Aquatics Super Cup
- Sport: Water polo
- Founded: 1976
- No. of teams: 2
- Country: European Aquatics members
- Continent: Europe
- Most recent champions: (Spain) Atlètic-Barceloneta (2nd title)
- Most titles: (Italy) Pro Recco (9 titles)
- Related competitions: European Aquatics Champions League; European Aquatics Euro Cup
- Website: len.eu

The European Aquatics Super Cup is an annual water polo match organized by European Aquatics and contested by the reigning champions of the two most important European club competitions, the European Aquatics Champions League and the European Aquatics Euro Cup.

From 1976 to 2002, the LEN Super Cup was contested between the winners of the European Champions Cup/LEN Champions League and the winners of the LEN Cup Winners' Cup. After the discontinuation of the LEN Cup Winners' Cup, it has been contested by the winners of the LEN Champions League and the winners of the LEN Trophy, which was renamed the LEN Euro Cup in 2011. From 2024, after LEN was renamed to European Aquatics, the new name is the European Aquatics Super Cup.

== Title holders ==
- 1976 (Socialist Federal Republic of Yugoslavia) Mladost
- 1977 (Soviet Union) CSK VMF Moscow
- 1978 (Hungary) Ferencváros
- 1979 (Hungary) OSC Budapest
- 1980 (Hungary) Ferencváros
- 1981 (Soviet Union) CSK VMF Moscow
- 1982 (Spain) Barcelona
- 1983 (Soviet Union) CSK VMF Moscow
- 1984 (Socialist Federal Republic of Yugoslavia) POŠK
- 1985 (Soviet Union) Dynamo Moscow
- 1986 (West Germany) Spandau 04
- 1987 (West Germany) Spandau 04
- 1988 (Italy) Pescara
- 1989 Not held
- 1990 (Socialist Federal Republic of Yugoslavia) Mladost
- 1991 (Federal Republic of Yugoslavia) Partizan
- 1992 (Spain) Catalunya
- 1993 (Italy) Pescara
- 1994 (Hungary) Újpest
- 1995 (Spain) Catalunya
- 1996 (Croatia) Mladost
- 1997–2001 Not held
- 2002 (Greece) Olympiacos
- 2003 (Italy) Pro Recco
- 2004 (Hungary) Honvéd
- 2005 (Italy) Posillipo
- 2006 (Croatia) Jug Dubrovnik
- 2007 (Italy) Pro Recco
- 2008 (Italy) Pro Recco
- 2009 (Montenegro) Primorac Kotor
- 2010 (Italy) Pro Recco
- 2011 (Serbia) Partizan
- 2012 (Italy) Pro Recco
- 2013 (Serbia) Crvena zvezda
- 2014 (Spain) Atlètic-Barceloneta
- 2015 (Italy) Pro Recco
- 2016 (Croatia) Jug Dubrovnik
- 2017 (Hungary) Szolnok
- 2018 (Hungary) Ferencváros
- 2019 (Hungary) Ferencváros
- 2020 Cancelled due to COVID-19 pandemic
- 2021 (Italy) Pro Recco
- 2022 (Italy) Pro Recco
- 2023 (Italy) Pro Recco
- 2024 (Hungary) Ferencváros
- 2025 (Hungary) Ferencváros
- 2026 (Spain) Atlètic-Barceloneta

== Finals ==
Winner of Europe Cup/Euroleague/Champions League
Winner of LEN Cup Winners' Cup
Winner of LEN Trophy/LEN Euro Cup

Year	Host city	Champion	Runner-up	1st game	2nd game
1976; Details	Ljubljana	(Socialist Federal Republic of Yugoslavia) Mladost	(Socialist Federal Republic of Yugoslavia) Partizan	11–10	Not held
1977; Details	Ljubljana	(Soviet Union) CSK VMF Moscow	(Soviet Union) MGU Moscow	6–4	Not held
1978; Details	Ljubljana	(Hungary) Ferencváros	(Italy) Canottieri Napoli	6–4	Not held
1979; Details	Ljubljana	(Hungary) OSC Budapest	(Socialist Federal Republic of Yugoslavia) Korčula	5–3	Not held
1980; Details	Ljubljana	(Hungary) Ferencváros	(Hungary) Vasas	7–6	Not held
1981; Details	Ljubljana	(Soviet Union) CSK VMF Moscow	(Socialist Federal Republic of Yugoslavia) Jug Dubrovnik	14–11	Not held
1982; Details	Skopje	(Spain) Barcelona	(Socialist Federal Republic of Yugoslavia) POŠK	12–11	Not held
1983; Details	Barcelona	(Soviet Union) CSK VMF Moscow	(West Germany) Spandau 04	11–6	Not held
1984; Details	Barcelona	(Socialist Federal Republic of Yugoslavia) POŠK	(Italy) Pro Recco	12–11	Not held
1985; Details	Barcelona	(Soviet Union) Dynamo Moscow	(Hungary) Vasas	15–9	Not held
1986; Details	Zürich	(West Germany) Spandau 04	(Hungary) Vasas	13–12	Not held
1987; Details	Zürich	(West Germany) Spandau 04	(Socialist Federal Republic of Yugoslavia) Mornar	10–8	Not held
1988; Details	Zürich	(Italy) Pescara	(Italy) Posillipo	9–8	Not held
1989	Not held				
1990; Details	Pescara & Zagreb	(Socialist Federal Republic of Yugoslavia) Mladost	(Italy) Pescara	11–12	11–7
1991; Details	Belgrade & Zagreb	(Federal Republic of Yugoslavia) Partizan	(Croatia) Mladost	8–7	11–10
1992; Details	Barcelona & Split	(Spain) Catalunya	(Croatia) Jadran Split	15–9	8–12
1993; Details	Split & Pescara	(Italy) Pescara	(Croatia) Jadran Split	12–12	7–5
1994; Details	Budapest & Pescara	(Hungary) Újpest	(Italy) Pescara	9–5	12–15
1995; Details	Budapest & Barcelona	(Spain) Catalunya	(Hungary) Vasas	6–8	12–9
1996; Details	Rome & Zagreb	(Croatia) Mladost	(Italy) Racing Roma	7–7	9–7
	Not held between 1997–2001				
2002; Details	Budapest	(Greece) Olympiacos	(Hungary) Vasas	6–5	Not held
2003; Details	Brescia	(Italy) Pro Recco	(Italy) Leonessa	6–5	Not held
2004; Details	Budapest	(Hungary) Honvéd	(Spain) Barcelona	10–9	Not held
2005; Details	Vicenza	(Italy) Posillipo	(Italy) Savona	11–9	Not held
2006; Details	Brescia	(Croatia) Jug Dubrovnik	(Italy) Leonessa	12–8	Not held
2007; Details	Kazan	(Italy) Pro Recco	(Russia) Sintez Kazan	11–9	Not held
2008; Details	Sori	(Italy) Pro Recco	(Russia) Shturm 2002	13–8	Not held
2009; Details	Kotor	(Montenegro) Primorac Kotor	(Hungary) Szeged	8–6	Not held
2010; Details	Trieste	(Italy) Pro Recco	(Montenegro) Cattaro	13–4	Not held
2011; Details	Savona	(Serbia) Partizan	(Italy) Savona	11–6	Not held
2012; Details	Savona	(Italy) Pro Recco	(Italy) Savona	14–7	Not held
2013; Details	Bečej	(Serbia) Crvena zvezda	(Serbia) Radnički Kragujevac	9–8	Not held
2014; Details	Barcelona	(Spain) Atlètic-Barceloneta	(Russia) Spartak Volgograd	12–7	Not held
2015; Details	Sori	(Italy) Pro Recco	(Italy) Posillipo	12–4	Not held
2016; Details	Dubrovnik	(Croatia) Jug Dubrovnik	(Italy) Brescia	10–4	Not held
2017; Details	Budapest	(Hungary) Szolnok	(Hungary) Ferencváros	6–6 ^{(4–2 PSO)}	Not held
2018; Details	Budapest	(Hungary) Ferencváros	(Greece) Olympiacos	7–7 ^{(4–2 PSO)}	Not held
2019; Details	Marseille	(Hungary) Ferencváros	(France) Marseille	14–11	Not held
2021; Details	Szolnok	(Italy) Pro Recco	(Hungary) Szolnok	15–4	Not held
2022; Details	Sabadell	(Italy) Pro Recco	(Spain) Sabadell	16–8	Not held
2023; Details	Chiavari	(Italy) Pro Recco	(Hungary) Vasas	18–10	Not held
2024; Details	Budapest	(Hungary) Ferencváros	(Croatia) Jug Dubrovnik	13–9	Not held
2025; Details	Budapest	(Hungary) Ferencváros	(Italy) Pro Recco	15–14	Not held
2026; Details	Barcelona	(Spain) Atlètic-Barceloneta	(France) Marseille	10–8	Not held

== Titles by club ==
Rank	Club	Titles	Runner-up	Champion Years
1.	(Italy) Pro Recco	9	2	2003, 2007, 2008, 2010, 2012, 2015, 2021, 2022, 2023
2.	(Hungary) Ferencváros	6	1	1978, 1980, 2018, 2019, 2024, 2025
3.	(Socialist Federal Republic of Yugoslavia) / (Croatia) Mladost	3	1	1976, 1990, 1996
4.	(Soviet Union) CSK VMF Moscow	3		1977, 1981, 1983
5.	(Italy) Pescara	2	2	1988, 1993
—	(Croatia) Jug Dubrovnik	2	2	2006, 2016
7.	(Germany) Spandau 04	2	1	1986, 1987
—	(Federal Republic of Yugoslavia) / (Serbia) Partizan	2	1	1991, 2011
9.	(Spain) Catalunya	2		1992, 1995
—	(Spain) Atlètic-Barceloneta	2		2014, 2026
10.	(Italy) Posillipo	1	2	2005
11.	(Spain) Barcelona	1	1	1982
—	(Socialist Federal Republic of Yugoslavia) POŠK	1	1	1984
—	(Greece) Olympiacos	1	1	2002
—	(Hungary) Szolnok	1	1	2017
15.	(Hungary) OSC Budapest	1		1979
—	(Soviet Union) Dynamo Moscow	1		1985
—	(Hungary) Újpest	1		1994
—	(Hungary) Honvéd	1		2004
—	(Montenegro) Primorac Kotor	1		2009
—	(Serbia) Crvena zvezda	1		2013
22.	(Hungary) Vasas		6
23.	(Italy) Savona		3
—	(Italy) Brescia		3
25.	(Croatia) Jadran Split		2
—	(France) Marseille		2
26.	(Soviet Union) MGU Moscow		1
—	(Italy) Canottieri Napoli		1
—	(Socialist Federal Republic of Yugoslavia) Korčula		1
—	(Socialist Federal Republic of Yugoslavia) Mornar		1
—	(Italy) Racing Roma		1
—	(Russia) Sintez Kazan		1
—	(Russia) Shturm 2002		1
—	(Hungary) Szeged		1
—	(Montenegro) Cattaro		1
—	(Serbia) Radnički Kragujevac		1
—	(Russia) Spartak Volgograd		1
—	(Spain) Sabadell		1

== Titles by nation ==
Rank	Country	Titles	Runners-up
1.	Italy	12	14
2.	Hungary	10	9
3.	Spain	5	2
4.	Soviet Union	4	1
5.	(Socialist Federal Republic of Yugoslavia) Yugoslavia	3	5
6.	Croatia	3	4
7.	Serbia	2	1
	Germany	2	1
9.	Greece	1	1
	Montenegro	1	1
11.	(Serbia and Montenegro) Serbia & Montenegro	1	0
12.	Russia	0	3
13.	France	0	2

== See also ==
=== Men ===
- European Aquatics Champions League
- European Aquatics Euro Cup
- European Aquatics Conference Cup
- European Aquatics Challenger Cup

=== Women ===
- European Aquatics Women's Champions League
- European Aquatics Women's Euro Cup
- European Aquatics Women's Conference Cup
- European Aquatics Women's Challenger Cup
- European Aquatics Women's Super Cup
