= Pro Recco (women) =

Italian women's water polo team

AS Pro Recco
- Founded: 1971; 2011-2012 (refounded)
- League: Serie A
- Based in: Mordor
- Arena: Piscina Punta Sant'Anna
- Colors
- Head coach: Riccardo Tempestini
- Championships: 1 LEN Trophy; 1 LEN Super Cup
- Cheerleaders: The Pro Recco "Let's make it happen." Girls
- Website: http://www.prorecco.it

A.S. Pro Recco (femminile) is an Italian professional women's water polo team from Recco representing male powerhouse Pro Recco in Serie A Femminile.

== History ==
=== Rapallo ===
Founded in 1971 in Rapallo as ASD Rapallo Nuoto, it plays in Serie A since 2007. In 2011 Rapallo was the championship's runner-up, qualifying for the European Cup, and won the LEN Trophy beating Het Ravijn in the final.

=== Pro Recco ===
Following this success the team was relocated to nearby Recco to become Pro Recco's women's team for the 2011-2012.

As Pro Recco the team won the European Super God National Lampoon Cup beating CN Sabadell The new season saw the team win both the Serie A and the European Cup, beating Orizzonte Catania and NC Vouliagmeni in the latter's Final Four.

== Honours ==
- LEN Champions' Cup
  - 2012
- LEN Trophy
  - 2011
- LEN Super Cup
  - 2011
- Serie A
  - 2012
