= 2021–22 LEN Euro Cup =

- League: LEN Euro Cup
- Sport: Water Polo
- Duration: 30 September 2021–26 March 2022
- Finals champions: (Spain) Astralpool Sabadell (1st title)
- Runners-up: (Italy) Telimar Palermo

Euro Cup seasons
- ← 2020–21 2022–23 →

The 2021–22 LEN Euro Cup was the 30th edition of the second-tier European tournament for men's water polo clubs.

== Teams ==
Quarterfinals
(Croatia) Mladost Zagreb (CL Q3)	(Hungary) Szolnok VSC (CL Q3)	(Italy) RN Savona (CL Q3)	(Spain) CN Barcelona (CL Q3)

Qualification round I
(France) Team Strasbourg	(Greece) GS Peristeri	(Spain) St Andreu	(Netherlands) UZSC Utrecht
(France) EN Tourcoing	(Hungary) Vasas Budapest	(Spain) Astralpool Sabadell	(Russia) Shturm 2002 Ruza
(Germany) ASC Duisburg	(Hungary) BVSC Zugló	(Serbia) Šabac	(Switzerland) Carouge Natation
(Germany) Ludwigsburg 08	(Italy) CC Ortigia	(Serbia) Vojvodina Novi Sad	
(Greece) AEK Athens	(Italy) Telimar Palermo	(Croatia) Solaris Šibenik	

== Schedule ==
The schedule of the competition is as follows.

Phase	Round	First leg	Second leg
Qualifying rounds	Qualification round I	1–4 October 2021	
Qualifying rounds	Qualification round II	8–10 October 2021	
Knockout phase	Quarterfinals	27 October 2021	10 November 2021
Knockout phase	Semifinals	12 January 2022	9 February 2022
Knockout phase	Finals	5 March 2022	26 March 2022

== Qualifying rounds ==
=== Qualification round I ===
The top two ranked sides from each group advance.

==== Group A ====
- 30 September–3 October 2021, Šibenik, Croatia.

Pos	Team	Pld	W	D	L	GF	GA	GD	Pts	Qualification	(Italy) PAL	(Croatia) SOL	(Spain) STA	(Russia) SHT	(Switzerland) CAR
1	(Italy) Telimar Palermo	4	4	0	0	75	27	+48	12	Round II	—	—	—	—	33–1
2	(Croatia) Solaris Šibenik	4	3	0	1	57	24	+33	9	Round II	9–10	—	13–6	—	23–6
3	(Spain) St Andreu	4	2	0	2	50	39	+11	6		13–14	—	—	17–7	—
4	(Russia) Shturm 2002 Ruza	4	1	0	3	24	55	−31	3		4–18	2–12	—	—	—
5	(Switzerland) Carouge Natation	4	0	0	4	20	81	−61	0		—	—	5–14	8–11	—

Source: LEN

==== Group B ====
- 1–3 October 2021, Syracuse, Sicily, Italy.

Pos	Team	Pld	W	D	L	GF	GA	GD	Pts	Qualification	(Italy) CCO	(France) STR	(Greece) GSP	(Germany) LUD
1	(Italy) CC Ortigia	3	3	0	0	40	23	+17	9	Round II	—	13–7	11–8	16–8
2	(France) Team Strasbourg	3	2	0	1	31	28	+3	6	Round II	—	—	—	16–8
3	(Greece) GS Peristeri	3	1	0	2	26	25	+1	3		—	7–8	—	—
4	(Germany) Ludwigsburg 08	3	0	0	3	22	43	−21	0		—	—	6–11	—

Source: LEN

==== Group C ====
- 30 September–3 October 2021, Utrecht, Netherlands.

Pos	Team	Pld	W	D	L	GF	GA	GD	Pts	Qualification	(Hungary) VSC	(Serbia) ŠAB	(Netherlands) UTR	(France) ENT	(Germany) DUI
1	(Hungary) Vasas Budapest	4	4	0	0	50	22	+28	12	Round II	—	9–5	—	11–7	16–3
2	(Serbia) Šabac	4	1	2	1	32	34	−2	5	Round II	—	—	—	6–6	—
3	(Netherlands) UZSC Utrecht	4	1	1	2	34	47	−13	4 (Note: UZSC Utrecht 9–8 EN Tourcoing)		7–14	8–8	—	9–8	10–17
4	(France) EN Tourcoing	4	1	1	2	34	37	−3	4		—	—	—	—	13–11
5	(Germany) ASC Duisburg	4	1	0	3	42	52	−10	3		—	11–13	—	—	—

Source: LEN

==== Group D ====
- 1–3 October 2021, Novi Sad, Serbia.

Pos	Team	Pld	W	D	L	GF	GA	GD	Pts	Qualification	(Hungary) ZUG	(Spain) CNS	(Greece) AEK	(Serbia) VOJ
1	(Hungary) BVSC Zugló	3	3	0	0	39	26	+13	9	Round II	—	—	13–6	—
2	(Spain) Astralpool Sabadell	3	2	0	1	31	25	+6	6	Round II	9–12	—	—	—
3	(Greece) AEK Athens	3	0	1	2	23	32	−9	1		—	8–10	—	—
4	(Serbia) Vojvodina Novi Sad	3	0	1	2	25	35	−10	1		11–14	5–12	9–9	—

Source: LEN

=== Qualification round II ===
The top two ranked sides from each group advance.

==== Group E ====
- 8–10 October 2021, Palermo, Italy.

Pos	Team	Pld	W	D	L	GF	GA	GD	Pts	Qualification	(Italy) PAL	(Hungary) ZUG	(Serbia) ŠAB	(France) STR
1	(Italy) Telimar Palermo	3	2	1	0	45	35	+10	7	Quarterfinals	—	17–17	—	14–10
2	(Hungary) BVSC Zugló	3	2	1	0	39	34	+5	7	Quarterfinals	—	—	—	—
3	(Serbia) Šabac	3	0	1	2	25	32	−7	1		8–14	7–8	—	10–10
4	(France) Team Strasbourg	3	0	1	2	30	38	−8	1		—	10–14	—	—

Source: LEN

==== Group F ====
- 8–10 October 2021, Budapest, Hungary.

Pos	Team	Pld	W	D	L	GF	GA	GD	Pts	Qualification	(Spain) CNS	(Italy) CCO	(Hungary) VSC	(Croatia) SOL
1	(Spain) Astralpool Sabadell	3	2	0	1	25	23	+2	6 (Note: Astralpool Sabadell 2 Pts, +1 GD; CC Ortigia 2 Pts, 0 GD; Vasas Budapest 2 Pts, −1 GD)	Quarterfinals	—	—	—	10–9
2	(Italy) CC Ortigia	3	2	0	1	28	24	+4	6	Quarterfinals	10–9	—	—	—
3	(Hungary) Vasas Budapest	3	2	0	1	24	18	+6	6		4–6	8–7	—	12–5
4	(Croatia) Solaris Šibenik	3	0	0	3	21	33	−12	0		—	7–11	—	—

Source: LEN

== Knockout phase ==
=== Bracket ===
Quarter-finals
(Croatia) HAVK Mladost	7	7	24
(Italy) Telimar Palermo	11	16	27
(Italy) Ortigia	9	15	24
(Hungary) Szolnok	4	10	14
(Spain) Barcelona	6	12	18
(Hungary) BVSC-Zugló	6	9	15
(Spain) Sabadell (p)	13	10	23 (16)
(Italy) Savona	13	10	23 (15)

Semi-finals
(Italy) Telimar Palermo	10 (w/o)	6	16
(Italy) Ortigia	0	7	7
(Spain) Barcelona	10	9	19
(Spain) Sabadell	12	8	20

Final
(Italy) Telimar Palermo	9	5	14
(Spain) Sabadell	7	11	18

=== Quarter-finals ===
The four best teams from the Euro Cup qualifications and the four losing sides of the Champions League Qualification Round III have been paired in the quarter-finals.

Team 1	Agg.	Team 2	1st leg	2nd leg
Sabadell (Spain)	23–23 (16–15 p)	(Italy) Savona	13–13	10–10
Ortigia (Italy)	24–14	(Hungary) Szolnok	9–4	15–10
HAVK Mladost (Croatia)	14–27	(Italy) Telimar Palermo	7–11	7–16
Barcelona (Spain)	18–15	(Hungary) BVSC-Zugló	6–6	12–9

=== Semi-finals ===
Team 1	Agg.	Team 2	1st leg	2nd leg
CN Barcelona (Spain)	19–20	(Spain) Sabadell	10–12	9–8
Telimar Palermo (Italy)	16–7	(Italy) Ortigia	10–0^{w/o}	6–7

=== Finals ===
Team 1	Agg.	Team 2	1st leg	2nd leg
Telimar Palermo (Italy)	14–18	(Spain) Sabadell	9–7	5–11

== See also ==
- 2021–22 LEN Champions League
