= 2016–17 LEN Euro Cup =

2016−17 LEN Euro Cup
- League: LEN Euro Cup
- Sport: Water Polo
- Duration: 14 October 2016 to 5 April 2017
- Teams: 19
- Finals champions: (Hungary) Ferencváros (1st title)
- Runners-up: (Romania) CSM Digi Oradea

Euro Cup seasons
- ← 2015–16 2017−18 →

The 2016–17 LEN Euro Cup was the second tier of European competition in water polo. It ran from 14 October 2016 to 5 April 2017.

== Overview ==
=== Team allocation ===
Qualification round I
(Croatia) POŠK Split	(Croatia) HAVK Mladost	(France) Montpellier	(France) Pays D’Aix Natation
(Hungary) Ferencvárosi TC	(Hungary) BVSC-Zugló	(Italy) CN Posillipo	(Italy) Canottieri Napoli
(Russia) Shturm 2002	(Russia) Kinef Kirishi	(Germany) OSC Potsdam	(Germany) Bayer Uerdingen
(Slovakia) Hornets Košice	(Montenegro) Primorac Kotor	(Spain) CN Terrassa	
Quarter-finals
(Romania) CSM Digi Oradea (CL Q3)	(Montenegro) Jadran Herceg Novi (CL Q3)	(Croatia) Primorje (CL Q3)	(Italy) SM Verona (CL Q3)

=== Round and draw dates ===
The schedule of the competition is as follows.

Phase	Round	First leg	Second leg
Qualifying	Qualification round I	14−16 October 2016	
Qualifying	Qualification round II	28−30 October 2016	
Knockout stage	Quarter-finals	30 November 2016	10 December 2016
Knockout stage	Semi-finals	18 January 2017	18 February 2017
Knockout stage	Final	22 March 2017	5 April 2017

== Qualifying rounds ==
=== Qualification round I ===
==== Group A ====
Tournament was played in Aix en Provence, France.

Pos	Team	Pld	W	D	L	GF	GA	GD	Pts	Qualification	(Croatia) MLA	(France) PAY	(France) MON	(Russia) SHT
1	(Croatia) HAVK Mladost	3	2	1	0	33	21	+12	7	Round II	—	—	—	15–6
2	(France) Pays D’Aix Natation (H)	3	1	1	1	28	27	+1	4	Round II	6–9	—	13–9	9–9
3	(France) Montpellier	3	0	2	1	29	33	−4	2		9–9	—	—	11–11
4	(Russia) Shturm 2002	3	0	2	1	26	35	−9	2		—	—	—	—

Source: LEN
(H) Hosts

==== Group B ====
Tournament was played in Split, Croatia.

Pos	Team	Pld	W	D	L	GF	GA	GD	Pts	Qualification	(Hungary) FER	(Croatia) SPL	(Germany) BAY
1	(Hungary) Ferencvárosi TC	2	2	0	0	30	18	+12	6	Round II	—	—	—
2	(Croatia) POŠK Split (H)	2	1	0	1	26	20	+6	3	Round II	12–13	—	14–7
3	(Germany) Bayer Uerdingen	2	0	0	2	13	31	−18	0		6–17	—	—

Source: LEN
(H) Hosts

==== Group C ====
Tournament was played in Košice, Slovakia.

Pos	Team	Pld	W	D	L	GF	GA	GD	Pts	Qualification	(Italy) NAP	(Hungary) ZUG	(Montenegro) PRI	(Slovakia) KOS
1	(Italy) Canottieri Napoli	3	3	0	0	34	26	+8	9	Round II	—	—	—	—
2	(Hungary) BVSC-Zugló	3	2	0	1	30	20	+10	6	Round II	8–9	—	8–7	—
3	(Montenegro) Primorac Kotor	3	1	0	2	26	27	−1	3		7–12	—	—	—
4	(Slovakia) Hornets Košice (H)	3	0	0	3	22	39	−17	0		11–13	4–14	7–12	—

Source: LEN
(H) Hosts

==== Group D ====
Tournament was played in Naples, Italy.

Pos	Team	Pld	W	D	L	GF	GA	GD	Pts	Qualification	(Italy) POS	(Spain) TER	(Russia) KIR	(Germany) PST
1	(Italy) CN Posillipo (H)	3	3	0	0	34	16	+18	9	Round II	—	8–7	9–6	17–3
2	(Spain) CN Terrassa	3	2	0	1	32	23	+9	6	Round II	—	—	11–7	—
3	(Russia) Kinef Kirishi	3	1	0	2	28	33	−5	3		—	—	—	15–13
4	(Germany) OSC Potsdam	3	0	0	3	24	46	−22	0		—	8–14	—	—

Source: LEN
(H) Hosts

=== Qualification round II ===
==== Group E ====
Tournament was played in Zagreb, Croatia.

Pos	Team	Pld	W	D	L	GF	GA	GD	Pts	Qualification	(Italy) POS	(Hungary) ZUG	(Croatia) MLA	(Croatia) SPL
1	(Italy) CN Posillipo	3	3	0	0	33	21	+12	9	Quarter-finals	—	12–8	8–6	—
2	(Hungary) BVSC-Zugló	3	2	0	1	31	29	+2	6	Quarter-finals	—	—	—	13–11
3	(Croatia) HAVK Mladost (H)	3	0	1	2	20	26	−6	1		—	6–10	—	8–8
4	(Croatia) POŠK Split	3	0	1	2	26	34	−8	1		7–13	—	—	—

Source: LEN
(H) Hosts

==== Group F ====
Tournament was played in Naples, Italy.

Pos	Team	Pld	W	D	L	GF	GA	GD	Pts	Qualification	(Hungary) FER	(Italy) NAP	(Spain) TER	(France) PAY
1	(Hungary) Ferencvárosi TC	3	3	0	0	34	23	+11	9	Quarter-finals	—	—	8–6	—
2	(Italy) Canottieri Napoli (H)	3	2	0	1	27	25	+2	6	Quarter-finals	7–10	—	7–4	13–11
3	(Spain) CN Terrassa	3	1	0	2	19	18	+1	3		—	—	—	9–3
4	(France) Pays D’Aix Natation	3	0	0	3	24	38	−14	0		10–16	—	—	—

Source: LEN
(H) Hosts

== Knockout stage ==
=== Bracket ===
Quarter-finals
(Hungary) BVSC-Zugló	13	6	19
(Italy) SM Verona	15	11	25
(Romania) CSM Digi Oradea	11	8	19
(Italy) Canottieri Napoli	7	5	12
(Italy) Posillipo	6	8	14
(Montenegro) Jadran Carine	9	7	16
(Croatia) Primorje Rijeka	9	8	17
(Hungary) Ferencváros	13	12	25

Semi-finals
(Italy) SM Verona	12	3	15 (3)
(Romania) CSM Digi Oradea (p)	10	5	15 (4)
(Montenegro) Jadran Carine	12	4	16
(Hungary) Ferencváros	11	6	17

Final
(Romania) CSM Digi Oradea	6	7	13
(Hungary) Ferencváros	12	7	19

=== Quarter-finals ===
Key to colors
Seeded in quarter finals draw
Unseeded in quarter finals draw

CL losers of QR3	EC first two of QR2
(Romania) CSM Digi Oradea	(Italy) CN Posillipo
(Montenegro) Jadran Herceg Novi	(Hungary) BVSC-Zugló
(Croatia) Primorje	(Hungary) Ferencvárosi TC
(Italy) SM Verona	(Italy) Canottieri Napoli

- 1st leg: 30 November 2016
- 2nd leg: 10 December 2016

Team 1	Agg.	Team 2	1st leg	2nd leg
Digi Oradea (Romania)	19–12	(Italy) Canottieri Napoli	11–7	8–5
BVSC-Zugló (Hungary)	19–25	(Italy) SM Verona	13–14	6–11
Primorje Rijeka (Croatia)	17–25	(Hungary) Ferencváros	9–13	8–12
Posillipo (Italy)	14–16	(Montenegro) Jadran Carine	6–9	8–7

=== Semi-finals ===
- 1st leg: 18 January 2017
- 2nd leg: 18 February 2017

Team 1	Agg.	Team 2	1st leg	2nd leg
Jadran Carine (Montenegro)	16–17	(Hungary) Ferencváros	12–11	4–6
SM Verona (Italy)	15–15(3–4 p)	(Romania) Digi Oradea	12–10	3–5

=== Final ===
- 1st leg: 22 March 2017
- 2nd leg: 5 April 2017

Team 1	Agg.	Team 2	1st leg	2nd leg
Digi Oradea (Romania)	13–19	(Hungary) Ferencváros	6–12	7–7

2016–17 LEN Euro Cup
Champions

Ferencvárosi TC
1st Cup

== See also ==
- 2016–17 LEN Champions League
