= WC Yugra =

Russian water polo club

- Founded: 2008
- League: Russian Championship
- Based in: Khanty-Mansiysk
- Colors
- Website: http://www.ugra-aquatics.ru/

WC Yugra (Russian: Югра) is a Russian professional women's water polo club from Khanty-Mansiysk founded in 2008. In 2011 and 2012 it reached the final of the LEN Trophy, lost respectively to Ethnikos Piraeus and RN Imperia.
