= European Aquatics Women's Euro Cup =

Water polo competition

LEN Women's Euro Cup
- Current season, competition or edition: 2025–26 European Aquatics Women's Euro Cup
- Sport: Water polo
- Founded: 1999
- President: Paolo Barelli
- Country: European Aquatics members
- Continent: Europe
- Most recent champions: (Spain) CN Catalunya (1st title)
- Most titles: (Italy) Gifa Palermo (Italy) Ortigia (Italy) Racing Roma (Russia) Shturm 2002 (Italy) Imperia (Greece) Ethnikos Piraeus (Hungary) UVSE (2 titles each)
- Level on pyramid: 2nd Tier (Europe)
- Website: LEN Women's Euro Cup

The European Aquatics Women's Euro Cup, formerly the Women's LEN Trophy and LEN Women's Euro Cup, is European Aquatics's second-tier competition for women's water polo clubs. It was first held in 2000 and 2001 as the LEN Women's Cup Winners' Cup. It was contested for many seasons by around 15 teams, which could qualify for it either directly due to high ranking in their domestic league or by being eliminated at certain stages of the Champions' Cup. After the last reformations in the European competitions system by LEN, only four teams contesting for the trophy, coming after elimination at that season's LEN Euro League quarterfinals stage. Italy's Gifa Palermo, Ortigia, Racing Roma, Imperia, Russia's Shturm Ruza, and Greece's Ethnikos Piraeus are the most successful clubs in the competition with two titles each.

From 2024, after LEN was renamed to European Aquatics, the new name is the European Aquatics Women's Euro Cup.

== Title holders ==

- 1999–00: (Italy) Gifa Palermo
- 2000–01: (Russia) SKIF Moscow
- 2001–02: (Italy) Gifa Palermo
- 2002–03: (Greece) NO Vouliagmeni
- 2003–04: (Italy) Ortigia
- 2004–05: (Italy) Ortigia
- 2005–06: (Hungary) Honvéd
- 2006–07: (Italy) Racing Roma
- 2007–08: (Italy) Racing Roma
- 2008–09: (Russia) Shturm Chekhov
- 2009–10: (Greece) Ethnikos Piraeus
- 2010–11: (Italy) Rapallo
- 2011–12: (Italy) Imperia
- 2012–13: (Russia) Shturm 2002
- 2013–14: (Greece) Olympiacos Piraeus
- 2014–15: (Italy) Imperia
- 2015–16: (Spain) Mataró
- 2016–17: (Hungary) UVSE Budapest
- 2017–18: (Hungary) Dunaújváros
- 2018–19: (Italy) Orizzonte Catania
- 2019–20: Cancelled due to COVID-19 pandemic
- 2020–21: (Russia) Kinef Kirishi
- 2021–22: (Greece) Ethnikos Piraeus
- 2022–23: (Hungary) UVSE Budapest
- 2023–24: (Italy) Plebiscito Padova
- 2024–25: (Netherlands) ZV De Zaan
- 2025–26: (Spain) CN Catalunya

== Finals ==
Year	Finalists			Semi-finalists	
Year	Champion	Score	Runner-up	Third place	Fourth place
1999–00; Details	(Italy); Gifa Palermo	14–8	(Greece); NO Vouliagmeni	(Netherlands); Het Ravijn	(Russia); Diana St.Petersburg
2000–01; Details	(Russia); SKIF Moscow	10–8	(Hungary); Dunaújváros	(Spain); Mediterrani	(Greece); Olympiacos Piraeus
2001–02; Details	(Italy); Gifa Palermo		(Russia); SKIF Moscow	(Spain); Mediterrani	(Greece); NO Vouliagmeni
2002–03; Details	(Greece); NO Vouliagmeni		(Russia); SKIF Moscow	(Netherlands); Het Ravijn	(Hungary); Szentes
2003–04; Details	(Italy); Ortigia		(Russia); Uralochka Zlatoust	(Spain); Sabadell	(Netherlands); Polar Bears Ede
2004–05; Details	(Italy); Ortigia		(Russia); Uralochka Zlatoust	(Greece); NO Vouliagmeni	(Russia); SKIF Izmailovo
2005–06; Details	(Hungary); Honvéd	8–3	(Greece); ANO Glyfada	(Italy); Fiorentina	(Netherlands); Het Ravijn
2006–07; Details	(Italy); Racing Roma	12–8	(Netherlands); Nereus	(Hungary); OSC Budapest	(Greece); Olympiacos Piraeus
2007–08; Details	(Italy); Racing Roma	10–9	(Greece); Olympiacos Piraeus	(Hungary); OSC Budapest	(Italy); Plebiscito Padova
2008–09; Details	(Russia); Shturm Chekhov	11–12, 14–11	(Hungary); Dunaújváros	(Russia); Dynamo Moscow	(Greece); Olympiacos Piraeus
2009–10; Details	(Greece); Ethnikos Piraeus	12–13, 17–13	(Russia); Yugra	(Netherlands); Donk Gouda	(Greece); NE Patras
2010–11; Details	(Italy); Rapallo	5–12, 12–3	(Netherlands); Het Ravijn	(Hungary); Szentes	(Russia); SKIF Izmailovo
2011–12; Details	(Italy); Imperia	12–13, 7–5	(Russia); Yugra	(Hungary); Szentes	(Greece); Olympiacos Piraeus
2012–13; Details	(Russia); Shturm 2002	17–10, 14–11	(Russia); SKIF Izmailovo	(Netherlands); Donk Gouda	(Russia); Uralochka Zlatoust
2013–14; Details	(Greece); Olympiacos Piraeus	10–9	(Italy); Firenze	(Russia); Yugra	(Russia); Kinef Kirishi
2014–15; Details	(Italy); Imperia	8–7	(Italy); Plebiscito Padova	(Greece); NO Vouliagmeni	(Hungary); Szentes
2015–16; Details	(Spain); Mataró	6–5	(Greece); NO Vouliagmeni	(Hungary); Szentes	(Russia); Uralochka Zlatoust
2016–17; Details	(Hungary); UVSE Budapest	7–6	(Italy); Plebiscito Padova	(Hungary); Dunaújváros	(Russia); Yugra
2017–18; Details	(Hungary); Dunaújváros	13–11	(Greece); Olympiacos Piraeus	(Spain); Mataró	(Italy); Plebiscito Padova
2018–19; Details	(Italy); Orizzonte Catania	10–9	(Hungary); UVSE Budapest	(Russia); Kinef Kirishi	(Spain); Sant Andreu
2019–20; Details	Cancelled due to the COVID-19 pandemic in Europe				
2020–21; Details	(Russia); Kinef Kirishi	10–8	(Spain); Mataró	(Spain); Sabadell	(Italy); SIS Roma
2021–22; Details	(Greece); Ethnikos Piraeus	12–8, 14–9	(Hungary); Dunaújváros	No semi-finals were held due to the 2022 Russian invasion of Ukraine	
2022–23; Details	(Hungary); UVSE Budapest	8–9, 13–9	(Hungary); FTC Telekom Budapest	(Hungary); Tigra ZF Eger	(Italy); Plebiscito Padova
2023–24; Details	(Italy); Plebiscito Padova	10–8	(Italy); Trieste	(Netherlands); ZV De Zaan	(Hungary); BVSC-Zugló
2024–25; Details	(Netherlands); ZV De Zaan	10–9, 14–7	(Italy); Trieste	(Greece); ANC Glyfada iRepair	(Spain); Tenerife Echeyde
2025–26; Details	(Spain); Catalunya	14–9, 13–11	(Spain); Atlètic-Barceloneta	(Italy); Trieste	(Hungary); BVSC-Manna ABC

Source: LEN (from 2000 to 2016).

== Titles by club ==
Rank	Club	Titles	Runner-up	Champion Years
1.	(Hungary) UVSE Budapest	2	1	2016–17, 2022–23
2.	(Italy) Gifa Palermo	2		1999–00, 2001–02
	(Italy) Ortigia	2		2003–04, 2004–05
	(Italy) Racing Roma	2		2006–07, 2007–08
	(Russia) Shturm	2		2008–09, 2012–13
	(Greece) Ethnikos Piraeus	2		2009–10, 2021–22
	(Italy) Imperia	2		2011–12, 2014–15
8.	(Russia) SKIF	1	3	2000–01
	(Hungary) Dunaújváros	1	3	2017–18
10.	(Greece) NO Vouliagmeni	1	2	2002–03
	(Greece) Olympiacos SF Piraeus	1	2	2013–14
	(Italy) Plebiscito Padova	1	2	2023–24
13.	(Spain) Mataró	1	1	2015–16
14.	(Hungary) Honvéd	1		2005–06
	(Italy) Rapallo	1		2010–11
	(Italy) Orizzonte Catania	1		2018–19
	(Russia) Kinef Kirishi	1		2020–21
	(Netherlands) ZV De Zaan	1		2024–25
	(Spain) Catalunya	1		2025–26
20.	(Russia) Yugra		2
	(Russia) Uralochka Zlatoust		2
	(Italy) Trieste		2
23.	(Netherlands) Het Ravijn		1
	(Greece) ANO Glyfada		1
	(Netherlands) Nereus		1
	(Italy) Firenze		1
	(Hungary) FTC Telekom Budapest		1
	(Spain) Atlètic-Barceloneta		1

== Titles by nation ==
Rank	Country	Titles	Runners-up
1.	Italy	11	5
2.	Russia	4	7
3.	Greece	4	5
	Hungary	4	5
5.	Spain	2	2
6.	Netherlands	1	2

== See also ==
=== Men ===
- European Aquatics Champions League
- European Aquatics Euro Cup
- European Aquatics Conference Cup
- European Aquatics Challenger Cup
- European Aquatics Super Cup

=== Women ===
- European Aquatics Women's Champions League
- European Aquatics Women's Conference Cup
- European Aquatics Women's Challenger Cup
- European Aquatics Women's Super Cup
