= 2008–09 LEN Cup =

Water polo competition

The LEN Cup 2008–09 was the 17th edition of this water polo competition, and was won by Szeged Beton VSE. It was the first time a Hungarian club won the competition since Újpesti TE's 3rd title in 1999.

== 1st Qualification Round ==
=== Group A (Istanbul) ===
	Team	PL	W	D	L	F	A	Pts
1.	(Croatia) Primorje Rijeka	3	3	0	0	58	15	9
2.	(Turkey) Galatasaray SK Istanbul	3	2	0	1	61	17	6
3.	(Germany) SG Neukölln Berlin	3	1	0	2	21	48	3
4.	(Portugal) Centro Desportivo Universitário do Porto	3	0	0	3	11	71	0

=== Group B (Budapest) ===
	Team	PL	W	D	L	F	A	Pts
1.	(Hungary) Újpesti TE	3	3	0	0	59	20	9
2.	(France) Montpellier Water Polo	3	2	0	1	45	25	6
3.	(Turkey) Adalar SSK Istanbul	3	1	0	2	31	53	3
4.	(Denmark) SK Frem Odense	3	0	0	3	25	62	0

=== Group C (Budapest) ===
	Team	PL	W	D	L	F	A	Pts
1.	(Croatia) Mornar Split	3	3	0	0	50	15	9
2.	(Spain) CN Sant Andreu, Barcelona	3	2	0	1	38	17	6
3.	(Netherlands) ZPB Barendrecht	3	1	0	2	18	49	3
4.	(Slovakia) ŠK Polície Košice	3	0	0	3	23	48	0

=== Group D (Vouliagmeni) ===
	Team	PL	W	D	L	F	A	Pts
1.	(Greece) Nautical Club of Vouliagmeni	3	3	0	0	36	16	9
2.	(Russia) VK Dynamo Moscow	3	2	0	1	45	31	6
3.	(Switzerland) SC Kreuzlingen	3	1	0	2	24	36	3
4.	(Netherlands) Polar Bears Ede	3	0	0	3	20	42	0

=== Group E (Prčanj) ===
	Team	PL	W	D	L	F	A	Pts
1.	(Serbia) Belgrade Water Polo Club	2	1	1	0	33	17	4
2.	(Montenegro) VK Val Prčanj	2	1	1	0	27	14	4
3.	(United Kingdom) Bristol Central SC	2	0	0	2	9	38	3

=== Group F (Kotor) ===
	Team	PL	W	D	L	F	A	Pts
2.	(Montenegro) Vaterpolo Akademija Cattaro, Kotor	2	2	0	0	47	7	6
2.	(Germany) SG Hannover	2	1	0	1	23	23	3
3.	(Portugal) SSCM Paredes Lousada	2	0	0	2	8	19	0

=== Group G (Szeged) ===
	Team	PL	W	D	L	F	A	Pts
2.	(Hungary) Szeged Beton VSE	2	2	0	0	19	11	6
2.	(Romania) CSA Steaua București	2	1	0	1	18	15	3
3.	(France) Dauphin FC Sète	2	0	0	2	8	19	0

=== Group H (Chios) ===
	Team	PL	W	D	L	F	A	Pts
2.	(Greece) Nautical Club of Chios	2	2	0	0	32	17	6
2.	(Russia) Spartak Volgograd	2	1	0	1	21	19	3
3.	(United Kingdom) Cheltenham SWPC	2	0	0	2	13	30	0

== 2nd Qualification Round ==
=== Group I (Oradea) ===
	Team	PL	W	D	L	F	A	Pts
1.	(Montenegro) Vaterpolo Akademija Cattaro, Kotor	3	3	0	0	40	16	9
2.	(Romania) CSM Leonardo Oradea	3	2	0	1	37	24	6
3.	(Netherlands) Widex GZC Gouda	3	1	0	2	21	37	3
4.	(Russia) Spartak Volgograd	3	0	0	3	17	38	0

=== Group J (Montpellier) ===
	Team	PL	W	D	L	F	A	Pts
1.	(Spain) CN Barcelona	3	3	0	0	46	23	9
2.	(Hungary) Szeged Beton VSE	3	2	0	1	40	24	6
3.	(France) Montpellier Water Polo	3	1	0	2	26	28	3
4.	(Poland) KS Arkonia Szczecin	3	0	0	3	15	52	0

=== Group K (Budapest) ===
	Team	PL	W	D	L	F	A	Pts
1.	(Hungary) Budapest Honvéd	3	3	0	0	62	13	9
2.	(Greece) Nautical Club of Chios	3	2	0	1	39	32	6
3.	(Montenegro) PVK Val Prčanj	3	1	0	2	35	45	3
4.	(Portugal) Portinado	3	0	0	3	20	66	0

=== Group L (Barcelona) ===
	Team	PL	W	D	L	F	A	Pts
1.	(Russia) VK Sintez Kazan	3	2	0	1	49	19	6
2.	(Spain) CN Sant Andreu, Barcelona	3	2	0	1	50	25	6
3.	(Hungary) Újpesti TE	3	2	0	1	45	31	6
4.	(United Kingdom) Rotherham Metro	3	0	0	3	15	84	0

=== Group M (Vouliagmeni) ===
	Team	PL	W	D	L	F	A	Pts
1.	(Greece) Panionios GSS Athens	3	3	0	0	55	18	9
2.	(Serbia) Belgrade Water Polo Club	3	1	1	1	28	29	4
3.	(Germany) SG Hannover	3	1	0	2	25	34	4
4.	(Austria) WC Tirol Innsbruck	3	0	0	3	18	45	0

=== Group N (Novi Sad) ===
	Team	PL	W	D	L	F	A	Pts
1.	(Serbia) VK Vojvodina Novi Sad	3	2	1	0	55	18	7
2.	(Greece) Nautical Club of Vouliagmeni	3	2	1	0	35	14	7
3.	(Romania) CSA Steaua București	3	1	0	2	20	17	3
4.	(Portugal) SC Salgueiros Porto	3	0	0	3	3	60	0

=== Group O (Novi Sad) ===
	Team	PL	W	D	L	F	A	Pts
1.	(Italy) ASD Posillipo Naples	3	3	0	0	34	21	9
2.	(Croatia) Mornar Split	3	2	0	1	37	30	6
3.	(Turkey) Galatasaray SK Istanbul	3	1	0	2	26	27	3
4.	BMK Kharkiv Ukraine	3	0	0	3	22	41	0

=== Group P (Rijeka) ===
	Team	PL	W	D	L	F	A	Pts
1.	(Russia) VK Dynamo Moscow	3	3	0	0	46	26	9
2.	(Croatia) Primorje Rijeka	3	2	0	1	44	19	6
3.	(Netherlands) Philips SV Eindhoven	3	1	0	2	35	32	3
4.	(Poland) Łódźi STW	3	0	0	3	16	64	0

== Eight finals ==
Team 1	Agg.	Team 2	1st leg	2nd leg
ASD CN Posilipo Naples (Italy)	21–16	(Croatia) Primorje Rijeka	12–6	9–10
Panionios GSS Athens (Greece)	23–13	(Spain) Club de Natació Sant Andreu, Barc.	11–5	10–8
Mornar Split (Croatia)	18–19	(Russia) VK Dynamo Moscow	11–7	7–12
CSM Leonardo Oradea (Romania)	15–23	(Spain) Club de Natació Barcelona	6–9	9–14
Belgrade Water Polo Club (Serbia)	12–21	(Russia) VK Sintez Kazan	6–10	6–11
Budapest Honvéd (Hungary)	24–11	(Greece) Nautical Club of Vouliagmeni	12–3	12–8
Nautical Club of Chios (Greece)	19–24	(Serbia) VK Vojvodina Novi Sad	10–10	9–14
VP Akademija Cattoro, Kotor (Montenegro)	10–12	(Hungary) Szeged Beton VSE	5–4	5–8

== Quarter finals ==
Team 1	Agg.	Team 2	1st leg	2nd leg
ASD CN Posilipo Naples (Italy)	18–19	(Greece) Panionios GS Athens	10–9	8–10
VK Dynamo Moscow (Russia)	19–24	(Spain) Club de Natació Barcelona	7–11	12–13
VK Sintez Kazan (Russia)	16–15	(Hungary) Budapest Honvéd	9–8	7–7
VK Vojvodina Novi Sad (Serbia)	18–19	(Hungary) Szeged Beton VSE	10–10	8–9

== Semifinals ==
Team 1	Agg.	Team 2	1st leg	2nd leg
Panionios GSS Athens (Greece)	17–15	(Spain) Club de Natació Barcelona	11–8	6–7
VK Sintez Kazan (Russia)	15–23	(Hungary) Szeged Beton VSE	10–10	5–8

== Final ==
Team 1	Agg.	Team 2	1st leg	2nd leg
Panionios GSS Athens (Greece)	21–23	(Hungary) Szeged Beton VSE	8–6	13–17
