= European Aquatics Women's Challenger Cup =

Third tier women's water polo tournament

- Current season, competition or edition: 2025–26 European Aquatics Women's Challenger Cup
- Sport: Water polo
- Founded: 2023
- Country: European Aquatics members
- Continent: Europe
- Most recent champion: (Turkey) Göztepe (1st title)
- Most titles: (Turkey) Izmir BBG/Göztepe (2 titles)
- Level on pyramid: 3rd Tier; 4th Tier from 2025

The European Aquatics Women's Challenger Cup, formerly the LEN Women's Challenger Cup is a water polo club competition organised by the Ligue Européenne de Natation (LEN). It acts as the third tier, below the LEN Women's Champions League and the LEN Women's Euro Cup. Its first season will commence in 2023–24.

From 2024, after LEN was renamed to European Aquatics, the new name is the European Aquatics Women's Challenger Cup.

== History ==
The Women's Challenger Cup was first mentioned on the 7 February by Stavroula Kozompoli. The LEN Women's Challenger Cup was officially created by LEN in on the 2 June 2023. In a similar fashion to the men's Tournament, the competition was inaugurated with the goal of creating more chances for smaller Water Polo nations to improve.

A year before the women's counterpart started, LEN formally announced they would create a Men's LEN Challenger Cup, starting in the 2022–23 season.

From 2025, after the introduction of the Conference Cup, the Challenger Cup will become the fourth tier tournament in European club water polo.

== Winners ==
Challenger Cup

Year	Final			Semi-finalists		
Year	Champion	Score	Second place	Third place	Score	Fourth place
2023–24; Details	(Turkey); Izmir BB GSK	10–9	(Serbia); VK Crvena Zvezda	(Croatia); ŽAVK Mladost	14–13	(Portugal); Benfica
2024–25; Details	(Turkey); Izmir BB GSK	9–8	(Turkey); Galatasaray	(Croatia); ŽAVK Mladost	15–9	(Serbia); VK Vojvodina
2025–26; Details	(Turkey); Göztepe	16–7	(Croatia); Jadran Split	(Germany); Esslingen	13–10	(Portugal); Clube Fluvial Portuense

== Editions ==
- 2023–24 LEN Women's Challenger Cup
- 2024–25 European Aquatics Women's Challenger Cup
- 2025–26 European Aquatics Women's Challenger Cup

== See also ==
=== Men ===
- European Aquatics Champions League
- European Aquatics Euro Cup
- European Aquatics Conference Cup
- European Aquatics Challenger Cup
- European Aquatics Super Cup

=== Women ===
- European Aquatics Women's Champions League
- European Aquatics Women's Euro Cup
- European Aquatics Women's Conference Cup
- European Aquatics Women's Super Cup
