= 2017 Women's LEN Super Cup =

Water polo match

UVSE	Kinef Kirishi
(Hungary)	(Russia)
6	10
- Date: 4 November 2017
- Venue: Császár-Komjádi Béla Uszoda, Budapest

The 2017 Women's LEN Super Cup was the 12th edition of the annual trophy organised by LEN and contested by the reigning champions of the two European competitions for women's water polo clubs. The contending teams were Russia's Kinef Kirishi (2016–17 Euro League champions) and Hungary's UVSE (winners of the 2016–17 LEN Trophy). The match was played just before the Men's Super Cup at the Császár-Komjádi Béla Uszoda, in Budapest, on 4 November 2017.

This was the first appearance in the Super Cup final for both teams, which won their first continental cup in the 2016–17 season. The European champions of Kinef Kirishi defeated 10–6 the home team of UVSE and won the Trophy.

== Teams ==
Team	Qualification	Previous participation (bold indicates winners)
(Russia) Kinef Kirishi	Winners of the 2016–17 LEN Euro League Women	Debut
(Hungary) UVSE	Winners of the 2016–17 Women's LEN Trophy	Debut

=== Squads ===
UVSE
No.	Nat.	Player	Birth Date	Position
1	(Hungary)	Edina Gangl	25 June 1990	Goalkeeper
2	(Hungary)	Dóra Czigány	23 October 1992	Field Player
3	(Hungary)	Mónika Pap	7 July 2001	Field Player
4	(Hungary)	Rebecca Parkes	18 August 1994	Field Player
5	(Hungary)	Gabriella Szűcs	7 March 1988	Field Player
6	(Hungary)	Rita Keszthelyi	10 December 1991	Field Player
7	(Hungary)	Dorottya Gyárfás	3 June 1999	Field Player
8	(Netherlands)	Vivian Sevenich	28 February 1993	Field Player
9	(Hungary)	Ildikó Tóth	23 April 1987	Field Player
10	(Hungary)	Dóra Csabai (c)	20 April 1989	Field Player
11	(Hungary)	Eszter Lara Kiss	5 October 1999	Field Player
12	(Hungary)	Anna Mucsy	19 February 1998	Field Player
13	(Hungary)	Lilla Maczkó	10 August 1999	Goalkeeper

Head coach: Márton Benczur

Kinef Kirishi
No.	Nat.	Player	Birth Date	Position
1	(Russia)	Anna Karnaukh	31 August 1993	Goalkeeper
2	(Russia)	Tatiana Zubkova	7 June 1995	Field Player
3	(Russia)	Ekaterina Prokofyeva	13 March 1991	Field Player
4	(Russia)	Anastasia Simanovich	23 January 1995	Field Player
5	(Russia)	Veronika Lapina	27 July 1999	Field Player
6	(Russia)	Kseniia Krimer	19 July 1992	Field Player
7	(Russia)	Bella Khamzaeva	15 May 1998	Field Player
8	(Russia)	Ekaterina Kirilcheva	17 May 1992	Field Player
9	(Russia)	Ekaterina Iakusheva	26 March 1997	Field Player
10	(Russia)	Evgeniia Soboleva (c)	26 August 1988	Field Player
11	(Russia)	Evgeniya Ivanova	26 July 1987	Field Player
12	(Russia)	Daria Ryzhkova	8 February 1995	Field Player
13	(Russia)	Daria Lukina	2 April 1999	Goalkeeper

Head coach: Aleksandr Kabanov

== Match ==
4 November 2017; 15:45 (UTC+01:00)	Report	(Hungary) UVSE	6–10	Kinef Kirishi (Russia)	Császár-Komjádi Béla Uszoda, Budapest; Referees: Severo (ITA), Torres (ESP)
4 November 2017; 15:45 (UTC+01:00)	Report	Score by quarters: 3–5, 2–2, 1–1, 0–2			Császár-Komjádi Béla Uszoda, Budapest; Referees: Severo (ITA), Torres (ESP)
4 November 2017; 15:45 (UTC+01:00)	Report	2: Czigány, Csabai; 1: Keszthelyi, Tóth	Goals	4: Simanovich; 2: Prokofyeva, Khazmaeva, Soboleva	Császár-Komjádi Béla Uszoda, Budapest; Referees: Severo (ITA), Torres (ESP)

== See also ==
- 2017 LEN Super Cup
