= Russian Women's Water Polo Championship =

Premier women's water polo tournament

- Sport: Water polo
- Founded: 1992
- No. of teams: 10
- Country: Russia
- Confederation: LEN (Europe)
- Most recent champion: Kinef Kirishi

The Russian Women's Water Polo Championship is the premier championship for women's water polo clubs in Russia. Founded in 1992 following the breakup of the Soviet Union, it is currently contested by ten teams.

Kinef Kirishi is the competition's most successful team, having won its last 19 editions. Double European champion SKIF Izmaylovo and Uralochka Zlatoust also dominated the competition in previous years.

== List of champions ==
- 1992 Uralochka Zlatoust
- 1993 Salyut Nizhny Novgorod
- 1994 SKIF Moscow
- 1995 SKIF Moscow
- 1996 SKIF Moscow
- 1997 SKIF Moscow
- 1998 SKIF Moscow
- 1999 Uralochka Zlatoust
- 2000 Uralochka Zlatoust
- 2001 Uralochka Zlatoust
- 2002 Uralochka Zlatoust
- 2003 Kinef Kirishi
- 2004 Kinef Kirishi
- 2005 Kinef Kirishi
- 2006 Kinef Kirishi
- 2007 Kinef Kirishi
- 2008 Kinef Kirishi
- 2009 Kinef Kirishi
- 2010 Kinef Kirishi
- 2011 Kinef Kirishi
- 2012 Kinef Kirishi
- 2013 Kinef Kirishi
- 2014 Kinef Kirishi
- 2015 Kinef Kirishi
- 2016 Kinef Kirishi
- 2017 Kinef Kirishi
- 2018 Kinef Kirishi
- 2019 Kinef Kirishi
- 2020 Kinef Kirishi
- 2021 Kinef Kirishi
- 2022 Kinef Kirishi
- 2023 Uralochka Zlatoust

== Titles by club ==
Rank	Club	Titles	Runner-up	Champion Years
1.	Kinef Kirishi	20	0	2003, 2004, 2005, 2006, 2007, 2008, 2009, 2010, 2011, 2012, 2013, 2014, 2015, 2016, 2017, 2018, 2019, 2020, 2021, 2022
2.	Uralochka Zlatoust	6	13	1992, 1999, 2000, 2001, 2002, 2023
3.	SKIF Moscow	5	4	1994, 1995, 1996, 1997, 1998
4.	Salyut Nizhny Novgorod	1	1	1993

== 2018-19 teams ==
- Diana Saint Petersburg
- Kazakhstan Junior
- Kinef Kirishi
- Kinef Kirishi – 2
- Olimp Nizhny-Novgorod
- SKIF Moscow
- Shturm Ruza
- Spartak Volgograd
- Uralochka Zlatoust
- Yugra Khanty-Mansiysk
