= VK Primorac Kotor =

Professional water polo club based in Montenegro

VPK Primorac
- Founded: 1922; 104 years ago
- League: Montenegrin First League; VRL Premier League; Euro Cup
- Based in: Kotor, Montenegro
- Arena: "Zoran Džimi Gopčević" Indoor Swimming Pool
- President: Dragan Samardžić
- Website: www.primorac.me

VPK Primorac is a professional water polo club based in Kotor, Montenegro. As of 2026–27 season, it competes in the Montenegrin First League, the regional VRL Premier League, and the Euro Cup.

== History ==
The club was founded in 1922 by Leopold Netović. Its first water polo match was played in 1926. Until the 1960s team competed in amateur divisions but in 1961 they reached the Yugoslavian first division. After a brief succession of promotions and relegations it remained in the top flight of Yugoslavian water polo until the breakup of that competition. The teams first major international success was in 1977 when they reached the European cup finals. In 1984 the club opened a winter facility. In 1986 they won the Yugoslav becoming the league champion and winner of the SFR Yugoslavia cup, achieving a domestic double.

In 2009, Primorac won the EuroLeague after defeating Pro Recco. In 2010, they finished as runner-ups against Pro Recco.

== Swimming Pool ==
The club plays its home games in city's indoor swimming pool "Zoran Džimi Gopčević", named after Montenegrin water polo player Zoran Gopčević. The move to change the swimming pool in 2021 in his name was deemed controversial and protested by Croatia, as Gopčević served as guard at 1991 Morinj camp where Croatian prisoners of war and civilians were kept by Montenegrin authorities.

== Personnel ==
=== Current roster ===
- (Montenegro) Aleksandro Kralj
- (Montenegro) Vuk Drašković
- (Montenegro) Aljoša Mačić
- (Montenegro) Djordjije Stanojević
- (Montenegro) Alen Isljamović
- (Montenegro) Dušan Matković
- (Montenegro) Marko Gopćević
- (Montenegro) Draško Šekarić
- (Montenegro) Nedjo Baštrica
- (Montenegro) Dragoljub Ćetković
- (Montenegro) Balša Nikolić
- (Montenegro) Balša Vučković
- (Montenegro) Jakov Bulajić
- (Montenegro) Miloš Vukšić
- (Montenegro) Mlađan Janović
- (Montenegro) Pavle Krivokapić

=== Coach ===
- (Montenegro) Vido Lompar
- (Croatia) Sandro Sukno
- (Montenegro) Miodrag Matković

=== Famous players ===
- (Montenegro) Veljko Uskoković
- (Montenegro) Nikola Janović
- (Montenegro) Mlađan Janović
- (Montenegro) Zvonimir Milošević (Zvonko Milošević)
- (Montenegro) Draško Brguljan
- (Hungary) Gergely Kiss
- (Montenegro) Darko Brguljan
- (Montenegro) Ranko Perović
- (Montenegro) Zdravko Radić
- (United States) Tony Azevedo
- (Montenegro) Zoran Gopčević
- (Montenegro) Vjekoslav Pasković
- (Montenegro) Mirko Vičević
- (Hungary) Ádám Steinmetz
- (Montenegro) Srđan Barba
- (Montenegro) Filip Trajković
- (Montenegro) Nebojša Milić
- (Croatia) Anđelo Šetka
- (Montenegro) Nenad Vukanić
- (Montenegro) Trifun Miro Ćirković

Notable former coaches

- (Montenegro) Ranko Perović

== Recent seasons ==
=== Rankings in Montenegrin First League ===
| P. | 07 | 08 | 09 | 10 | 11 | 12 | 13 | 14 | 15 |
|---|---|---|---|---|---|---|---|---|---|
| 1 | 1 | 1 | | | | | | | |
| 2 | | | 2 | 2 | | | 2 | | |
| 3 | | | | | 3 | 3 | | 3 | 3 |
| 4 | | | | | | | | | |

=== In European competition ===
- Participations in Champions League (Euroleague): 11x
- Participations in Euro Cup (LEN Cup): 10x

| Season | Competition | Round | Club | Home | Away | Aggregate |
|---|---|---|---|---|---|---|
| 2003-04 | Euroleague | Preliminary round (Group C) | (Croatia) HAVK Mladost | 9–6 | 6–9 | 2nd place |
| 2003-04 | Euroleague | Preliminary round (Group C) | (France) Olympic Nice | 5–6 | 7-7 | 2nd place |
| 2003-04 | Euroleague | Preliminary round (Group C) | (Hungary) BVSC | 8–1 | 9–8 | 2nd place |
| 2003-04 | Euroleague | Quarter-finals | (Russia) Shturm Ruza | 7–6 | 6–8 | 13–14 |
| 2004-05 | Euroleague | elimination in Second qualifying round | | | | |
| 2004-05 | LEN Cup | Round of 16 | (Greece) Patras | 12–6 | 8–7 | 20–13 |
| 2004-05 | LEN Cup | Quarter-finals | (Russia) Sintez Kazan | 7–6 | 11–10 | 18–16 |
| 2004-05 | LEN Cup | Semi-finals | (Italy) Savona | 7-7 | 3–9 | 10–16 |
| 2005-06 | Euroleague | elimination in Second qualifying round | | | | |
| 2005-06 | LEN Cup | Round of 16 | (Greece) Panionios | 11–8 | 7–13 | 18–21 |
| 2006-07 | Euroleague | elimination in Second qualifying round | | | | |
| 2007-08 | Euroleague | Preliminary round (Group C) | (Italy) Pro Recco | 10–9 | 6–14 | 2nd place |
| 2007-08 | Euroleague | Preliminary round (Group C) | (France) Marseille | 12–9 | 5–9 | 2nd place |
| 2007-08 | Euroleague | Preliminary round (Group C) | (Russia) Spartak Volgograd | 13–8 | 6-6 | 2nd place |
| 2007-08 | Euroleague | Quarter-finals | (Hungary) Vasas | 6–8 | 7–6 | 13–14 |
| 2008-09 | Euroleague; Champion | Preliminary round (Group C) | (Greece) Olympiacos | 7–9 | 8–9 | 2nd place |
| 2008-09 | Euroleague; Champion | Preliminary round (Group C) | (Italy) Brixia Leonessa | 15–7 | 13–9 | 2nd place |
| 2008-09 | Euroleague; Champion | Preliminary round (Group C) | (Croatia) Šibenik | 13–6 | 17–7 | 2nd place |
| 2008-09 | Euroleague; Champion | Quarter-finals | (Montenegro) Jadran Herceg Novi | 12-12 | 9–8 | 21–20 |
| 2008-09 | Euroleague; Champion | Semi Final (F4) | (Croatia) HAVK Mladost | 11–9 | | |
| 2008-09 | Euroleague; Champion | Final (F4) | (Italy) Pro Recco | 8–7 (aet) | | |
| 2009-10 | Euroleague; Finalist | Preliminary round (Group B) | (Croatia) Jug Dubrovnik | 14–10 | 9-9 | 1st place |
| 2009-10 | Euroleague; Finalist | Preliminary round (Group B) | (Hungary) Vasas | 9–7 | 8–5 | 1st place |
| 2009-10 | Euroleague; Finalist | Preliminary round (Group B) | (Greece) Panionios | 10–6 | 12–11 | 1st place |
| 2009-10 | Euroleague; Finalist | Quarter-finals | (Montenegro) Jadran Herceg Novi | 10–6 | 14–9 | 24–15 |
| 2009-10 | Euroleague; Finalist | Semi Final (F4) | (Croatia) Jug Dubrovnik | 11–10 | | |
| 2009-10 | Euroleague; Finalist | Final (F4) | (Italy) Pro Recco | 3–9 | | |
| 2010-11 | Euroleague | Preliminary round (Group A) | (Hungary) Vasas | 8–9 | 6–7 | 3rd place |
| 2010-11 | Euroleague | Preliminary round (Group A) | (Montenegro) Jadran Herceg Novi | 12–7 | 13–7 | 3rd place |
| 2010-11 | Euroleague | Preliminary round (Group A) | (Hungary) Szeged | 9-9 | 13–7 | 3rd place |
| 2011-12 | Champions League | elimination in First qualifying round | | | | |
| 2011-12 | Euro Cup | elimination in Second qualifying round | | | | |
| 2013-14 | Euro Cup | Quarter-finals | (Croatia) HAVK Mladost | 3–10 | 4–14 | 7–24 |
| 2014-15 | Euro Cup | elimination in Second qualifying round | | | | |
| 2015-16 | Euro Cup | elimination in First qualifying round | | | | |
| 2016-17 | Euro Cup | elimination in First qualifying round | | | | |
| 2017-18 | Euro Cup | elimination in Second qualifying round | | | | |
| 2018-19 | Euro Cup | Quarter-finals | (Montenegro) Jadran Herceg Novi | 9–11 | 6–15 | 15–26 |
| 2020-21 | Champions League | elimination in Qualifying round | | | | |
| 2020-21 | Euro Cup | Round of 16 | (Hungary) Szolnok | 8–18 | 16–17 | 24–35 |
| 2021-22 | Champions League | elimination in Second qualifying round | | | | |
