= European Aquatics Challenger Cup =

Water polo club competition

- Current season, competition or edition: 2025–26 European Aquatics Challenger Cup
- Sport: Water polo
- Founded: 2022
- President: Patrice Coste
- Country: European Aquatics members
- Continent: Europe
- Most recent champion: (Turkey) Galatasaray (2nd title)
- Most titles: (Turkey) Galatasaray (2 titles)
- Level on pyramid: 3rd Tier (2022–2025); 4th Tier (2025–present)

The European Aquatics Challenger Cup is a water polo club competition organised by the European Aquatics. It acts as the fourth tier, below the European Aquatics Champions League, European Aquatics Euro Cup and the European Aquatics Conference Cup. GS Apollon Smyrnis of Greece became the first champions, defeating CN Terrassa of Spain in the final. From 2024, after LEN was renamed to European Aquatics, the new name is the European Aquatics Challenger Cup.

== History ==
The European Aquatics Challenger Cup was created by European Aquatics (formerly LEN) in 2022, with the goal of creating more opportunities for developing Water Polo nations.

On the 2 June 2023, LEN formally announced they would create a LEN Women's Challenger Cup, starting in the 2023–24 season.

From 2025, after the introduction of the Conference Cup, the Challenger Cup will become the fourth tier tournament in European club water polo.

== Winners ==
Challenger Cup

Year	Final			Semi-finalists	
Year	Champion	Score	Second place		
2022–23; Details	(Greece); GS Apollon Smyrnis	30–25 (12–11 / 18–14)	(Spain); CN Terrassa	(Spain); Tenerife Echeyde	(Turkey); Enkaspor
2023–24; Details	(Turkey); Galatasaray	33–19 (14–6 / 19–13)	(Slovenia); Triglav Kranj	(Lithuania); EVK Zaibas	(Switzerland); SC Kreuzlingen
2024–25; Details	(Netherlands); GZC Donk	23–22 (11–13 / 12–9)	(Lithuania); EVK Zaibas	(Malta); Sliema ASC	(Netherlands); ZV De Zaan
2025–26; Details	(Turkey); Galatasaray SK	13–11	(Lithuania); EVK Zaibas	(Malta); Sliema ASC	(Turkey); Enkaspor

== Editions ==
- 2022–23 LEN Challenger Cup
- 2023–24 LEN Challenger Cup
- 2024–25 LEN Challenger Cup

== See also ==
=== Men ===
- European Aquatics Champions League
- European Aquatics Euro Cup
- European Aquatics Conference Cup
- European Aquatics Super Cup

=== Women ===
- European Aquatics Women's Champions League
- European Aquatics Women's Euro Cup
- European Aquatics Women's Conference Cup
- European Aquatics Women's Challenger Cup
- European Aquatics Women's Super Cup
