= European Aquatics Women's Conference Cup =

Water polo club competition

- Current season, competition or edition: 2025–26 European Aquatics Women's Conference Cup
- Sport: Water polo
- Founded: 2025
- President: Patrice Coste
- Country: European Aquatics members
- Continent: Europe
- Most recent champion: (Italy) Smile Cosenza Pallanuoto (1st title)
- Most titles: (Italy) Smile Cosenza Pallanuoto (1 title)
- Level on pyramid: 3rd Tier
- Website: [ Conference Cup]

The European Aquatics Women's Conference Cup is a water polo club competition organised by the European Aquatics. It acts as the third tier, below the European Aquatics Women's Champions League and the European Aquatics Women's Euro Cup.

== History ==
On 2 April 2025, European Aquatics announced the introduction of the Conference Cup, starting in the 2025–26 season. It will replace the European Aquatics Women's Challenger Cup as the third tier tournament in European water polo.

== Winners ==
Conference Cup

| Year | Final | | | Semi-finalists | | |
| Year | Champion | Score | Second place | Third place | Score | Fourth place |
| 2025–26; Details | (Italy); Smile Cosenza Pallanuoto | 14–13 | (Spain); CN Sant Feliu | (Greece); Panionios GSS | 13–10 | (Spain); Tenerife Echeyde |

== See also ==
=== Men ===
- European Aquatics Champions League
- European Aquatics Euro Cup
- European Aquatics Conference Cup
- European Aquatics Challenger Cup
- European Aquatics Super Cup

=== Women ===
- European Aquatics Women's Champions League
- European Aquatics Women's Euro Cup
- European Aquatics Women's Challenger Cup
- European Aquatics Women's Super Cup
