= Gifa Palermo =

- Founded: 1979
- League: Serie A2 (women)
- Based in: Palermo, Italy
- Colors: Pink and black
- President: Fabio Gioia
- Head coach: Elisa Petruso
- Championships: 2 Women's LEN Trophy
- Website: http://www.gifawaterpolo.it

Gifa Palermo is an amateur Italian multi-sports club from Palermo, founded in 1979 with major activities in the areas of diving and water polo. Currently its main activities are the women's water polo team and a center for start swimming and water polo. In 2004, the company was awarded the Bronze Star CONI. The president of the club is Fabio Gioia.

== Water polo team ==
Eight years after the founding of the club, in 1987, a group of ex-swimmers chose the sports club to found a women's water polo team, in 1989 after two seasons in the lower divisions, Gifa arrived in A1, a category in which it played uninterruptedly since then, getting even six second places. In the prize list of the team include two LEN trophies, won in 1999-00 and in 2001-02. The team colors are pink and black. Currently the team plays in the championship serie A2.

== Honours ==
Women's LEN Trophy

- Winners (2): 1999-00, 2001–02
