= European Aquatics Conference Cup =

Water polo club competition

- Current season, competition or edition: 2025–26 European Aquatics Conference Cup
- Sport: Water polo
- Founded: 2025
- President: Patrice Coste
- Country: European Aquatics members
- Continent: Europe
- Most recent champion: (Italy) De Akker Team
- Most titles: (Italy) De Akker Team (1 title)
- Level on pyramid: 3rd Tier
- Website: Conference Cup

The European Aquatics Conference Cup is a water polo club competition organised by the European Aquatics. It acts as the third tier, below the European Aquatics Champions League and the European Aquatics Euro Cup.

== History ==
On 2 April 2025, European Aquatics announced the introduction of the Conference Cup, starting in the 2025–26 season. It will replace the European Aquatics Challenger Cup as the third tier tournament in European water polo.

== Winners ==
Conference Cup

Year	Final			Semi-finalists		
Year	Champion	Score	Second place	Third place	Score	Fourth place
2025–26; Details	(Italy); De Akker Team	17–14	(Hungary); Endo Plus SH	(Greece); GS Apollon Smyrnis	15–13	(Greece); Panionios GSS

== See also ==
=== Men ===
- European Aquatics Champions League
- European Aquatics Euro Cup
- European Aquatics Challenger Cup
- European Aquatics Super Cup

=== Women ===
- European Aquatics Women's Champions League
- European Aquatics Women's Euro Cup
- European Aquatics Women's Conference Cup
- European Aquatics Women's Challenger Cup
- European Aquatics Women's Super Cup
