= VK Crvena zvezda =

Serbian water polo club

- Official logo
- Full name: Ватерполо клуб Црвена звезда Vaterpolo klub Crvena zvezda (Red Star Water Polo Club)
- Nickname: Звезда / Zvezda (The Star) Црвено-бели / Crveno-beli (The Red-Whites)
- Founded: 4 March 1945; 81 years ago
- Based in: Belgrade, Serbia
- Colors: Red and white
- President: Viktor Jelenić
- Website: vkcrvenazvezda.com

VK Crvena zvezda (full name: Vaterpolo klub Crvena zvezda) is a professional water polo club based in Belgrade, Serbia. It is part of the SD Crvena Zvezda sports society.

== History ==
VK Crvena zvezda won the 2012–13 European Aquatics Champions League after beating Jug Dubrovnik 8–7 in the final. That was the first time that VK Crvena zvezda triumphed in the European Aquatics Champions League. They finished the season in a brilliant way, after having won the Serbian League and the Serbian Cup. In the 2013–14 season, VK Crvena zvezda won the European Aquatics Super Cup and successfully defended domestic double.

In 2016, due to financial troubles, VK Crvena zvezda decided to play its home matches at Zrenjanin City Pool.

== Honours ==
| Honours | | No. | Years |
League – 4
| FR Yugoslav League | Winners | 2 | 1991–92, 1992–93 |
| Serbian League | Winners | 2 | 2012–13, 2013–14 |
Cups – 4
| Serbian Cup | Winners | 4 | 2012–13, 2013–14, 2020–21, 2022–23 |
Regional – 1
| Regional A2 League | Winners | 1 | 2017–18 |
European – 2
| European Aquatics Champions League | Winners | 1 | 2012–13 |
| European Aquatics Super Cup | Winners | 1 | 2013 |

== Season by season ==
| Season | Tier | League | VRL Regional | RWP Regional | Domestic cup | European competitions | |
|---|---|---|---|---|---|---|---|
| 2025–26 | 1 | SF | 7th place | | QF | 3 Conference Cup | QR2 |
| 2024–25 | 1 | 4th place | | 10th place | Runners-up | - | |
| 2023–24 | 1 | 4th place | | 5th place | Runners-up | 2 LEN Euro Cup | QF |
| 2022–23 | 1 | Runners-up | | 6th place | Winners | 2 LEN Euro Cup | Round of 16 |
| 2021–22 | 1 | QF | | 6th place | SF | 1 LEN Champions League | PR 14th overall |
| 2020–21 | 1 | 3rd place | | 5th place | Winners | 2 LEN Euro Cup | Semi-finals |
| 2019–20 | 1 | CX | | 5th place | SF | 1 LEN Champions League | Q2 |
| 2018–19 | 1 | Runners-up | | 7th place | SF | 1 LEN Champions League | PR 16th overall |
| 2017–18 | 1 | Runners-up | | 1st place (tier 2) | SF | 2 LEN Euro Cup | Quarter-finals |
| 2016–17 | 1 | 3rd place | | 4th place (tier 2) | Runners-up | 1 LEN Champions League | Q2 |

=== In European competition ===
Note: Updated as of 2022-23 season.

- Participations in Champions League: 7x
- Participations in Euro Cup (LEN Cup): 5x

| Season | Competition | Round | Club | Home | Away | Aggregate |
|---|---|---|---|---|---|---|
| 2006-07 | LEN Cup | elimination in Second qualifying round | | | | |
| 2011-12 | Euro Cup | Round of 16 | (Romania) CSM Oradea | 8-6 | 9-9 | 17–15 |
| 2011-12 | Euro Cup | Quarter-finals | (Italy) Posillipo | 9-9 | 3-6 | 12–15 |
| 2012-13 | Champions League; Champion | Preliminary round (Group B) | (Croatia) Jug Dubrovnik | 6-10 | 5-10 | 2nd place |
| 2012-13 | Champions League; Champion | Preliminary round (Group B) | (Greece) Olympiacos | 11-9 | 8-9 | 2nd place |
| 2012-13 | Champions League; Champion | Preliminary round (Group B) | (France) Montpellier | 10-8 | 16-8 | 2nd place |
| 2012-13 | Champions League; Champion | Preliminary round (Group B) | (Switzerland) Kreuzlingen | 26-7 | 24-12 | 2nd place |
| 2012-13 | Champions League; Champion | Round of 16 | (Hungary) Eger | 13-6 | 8-8 | 21–14 |
| 2012-13 | Champions League; Champion | Quarter-finals | (Hungary) Szeged | 10-11 | 7-5 | 17–16 |
| 2012-13 | Champions League; Champion | Semi-final (F4) | (Spain) Barceloneta | 9–5 | | |
| 2012-13 | Champions League; Champion | Final (F4) | (Croatia) Jug Dubrovnik | 8–7 | | |
| 2014-15 | Champions League | elimination in Third qualifying round | | | | |
| 2016-17 | Champions League | elimination in Second qualifying round | | | | |
| 2017-18 | Champions League | elimination in Third qualifying round | | | | |
| 2017-18 | Euro Cup | Quarter-finals | (Italy) Sport Management | 5-10 | 8-15 | 13–25 |
| 2018-19 | Champions League | Preliminary round (Group A) | (Italy) Pro Recco | 4-17 | 6-21 | 8th place |
| 2018-19 | Champions League | Preliminary round (Group A) | (Spain) Barceloneta | 3-14 | 3-14 | 8th place |
| 2018-19 | Champions League | Preliminary round (Group A) | (Hungary) Eger | 12-13 | 11-17 | 8th place |
| 2018-19 | Champions League | Preliminary round (Group A) | (Russia) Dynamo Moscow | 8-17 | 4-14 | 8th place |
| 2018-19 | Champions League | Preliminary round (Group A) | (Romania) Steaua București | 7-9 | 3-8 | 8th place |
| 2018-19 | Champions League | Preliminary round (Group A) | (Hungary) Ferencváros | 6-15 | 9-17 | 8th place |
| 2018-19 | Champions League | Preliminary round (Group A) | (Italy) Brescia | 9-13 | 2-7 | 8th place |
| 2019-20 | Champions League | elimination in Second qualifying round | | | | |
| 2020-21 | Euro Cup | Round of 16 | (France) Tourcoing | 7-6 | 12-9 | 19–15 |
| 2020-21 | Euro Cup | Quarter-finals | (Russia) Dynamo Moscow | 9-9 | 11-8 | 20–17 |
| 2020-21 | Euro Cup | Semi-finals | (Hungary) Szolnok | 12-20 | 8-15 | 20–35 |
| 2021-22 | Champions League | Preliminary round (Group B) | (Italy) Pro Recco | 12-14 | 7-13 | 7th place |
| 2021-22 | Champions League | Preliminary round (Group B) | (Croatia) Jug Dubrovnik | 13-19 | 11-17 | 7th place |
| 2021-22 | Champions League | Preliminary round (Group B) | (Germany) Waspo Hannover | 12-15 | 11-14 | 7th place |
| 2021-22 | Champions League | Preliminary round (Group B) | (France) Marseille | 8-11 | 0-10^{w/o} | 7th place |
| 2021-22 | Champions League | Preliminary round (Group B) | (Germany) Spandau 04 | 12-9 | 11-12 | 7th place |
| 2021-22 | Champions League | Preliminary round (Group B) | (Romania) Steaua București | 10-10 | 11-8 | 7th place |
| 2021-22 | Champions League | Preliminary round (Group B) | (Hungary) Orvosegyetem SC | 8-11 | 9-13 | 7th place |
| 2022-23 | Euro Cup | Round of 16 | (Hungary) Vasas | 11-7 | 10-15 | 21–22 |

== Current team ==
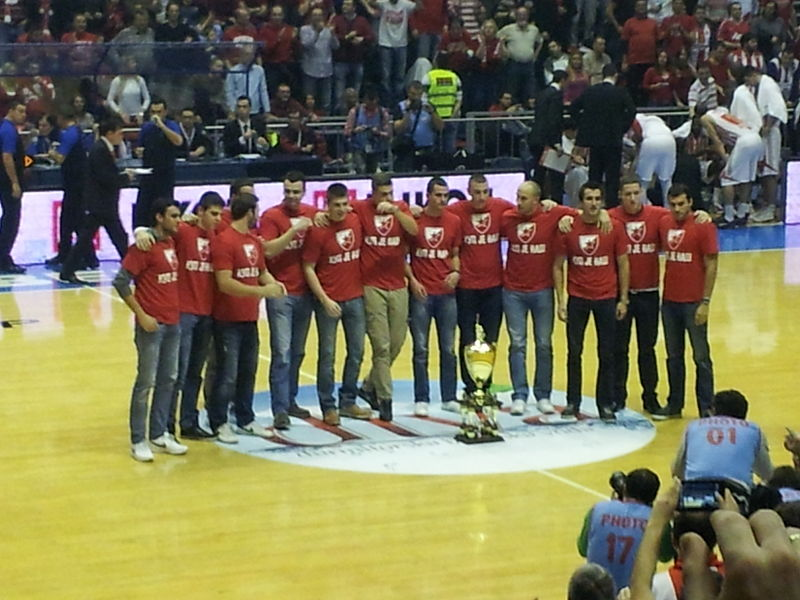
VK Crvena zvezda team in 2013.

| Νο | Player |
|---|---|
| 1 | (Serbia) Vladimir Mišović |
| 2 | (Serbia) Nikola Bursać |
| 3 | (Serbia) Rodoljub Gajić |
| 4 | (Kazakhstan) Dušan Marković |
| 5 | (Serbia) Gavril Subotić |
| 6 | (Georgia (country)) Dušan Vasić |
| 7 | (Serbia) Draško Gogov |
| 8 | (Serbia) Ivan Basara |
| 9 | (Serbia) Miloš Vukićević |
| 10 | (Slovakia) Lukáš Seman |
| 11 | (Serbia) Vuk Milojević |
| 12 | (Serbia) Marko Radović |
| 13 | (Serbia) Mihajlo Ivanović |
| | (Serbia) Relja Danković |
| | (Serbia) Aleksa Popović |
| | (Serbia) Viktor Savić |
| | (Serbia) Đorđe Živković |
Coach: (Serbia) Aleksandar Filipović

== Notable squads ==
1991–92 squad

- Dragan Dobrić, Pino Dragojević, Viktor Jelenić, Igor Milanović, Dragoljub Milošević, Ratko Pejović, Dejan Perišić, Todor Prlainović, Nikola Ribić, Dragan Strugar, Vaso Subotić, Milan Tadić, Aleksandar Tičić, Jugoslav Vasović, Vladimir Vujasinović; Coach: Nikola Stamenić

1992–93 squad

- Aleksandar Ćirić, Dragan Dobrić, Čedomir Drašković, Viktor Jelenić, Dragan Kožul, Vladimir Mitrović, Dejan Perišić, Nikola Ribić, Vaso Subotić, Aleksandar Šapić, Milan Tadić, Aleksandar Tičić, Jugoslav Vasović, Vladimir Vujasinović; Coach: Milorad Krivokapić

2012–13 squad

- Denis Šefik, Strahinja Rašović, Nikola Rađen, Petar Ivošević, Mihajlo Milićević, Duško Pijetlović, Marko Avramović, Viktor Rašović, Sava Ranđelović, Boris Vapenski, Andrija Prlainović, Nenad Stojčić, Marko Draksimović, Nikola Eškert; Coach: Dejan Savić

2013–14 squad

- Denis Šefik, Strahinja Rašović, Nikola Rađen, Petar Ivošević, Filip Kljajević, Nikola Vukčević, Marko Avramović, Viktor Rašović, Sava Ranđelović, Boris Vapenski, Andrija Prlainović, John Mann, Marko Draksimović, Mihajlo Milićević; Coach: Dejan Savić

== Notable players ==
- (Socialist Federal Republic of Yugoslavia) Dragan Solomun
- (Socialist Federal Republic of Yugoslavia) Ivica Tucak
- (Serbia and Montenegro) Igor Milanović
- (Serbia and Montenegro) Viktor Jelenić
- (Serbia and Montenegro) Vladimir Vujasinović
- (Serbia and Montenegro) Jugoslav Vasović
- (Serbia and Montenegro) Vaso Subotić
- (Serbia and Montenegro) Milan Tadić
- (Serbia and Montenegro) Aleksandar Ćirić
- (Serbia and Montenegro) Aleksandar Šapić
- (Serbia and Montenegro) Slavko Gak
- (Serbia and Montenegro) Branko Peković
- (Serbia and Montenegro) Nikola Janović
- (Serbia) Dejan Savić
- (Serbia) Gojko Pijetlović
- (Serbia) Duško Pijetlović
- (Serbia) Boris Vapenski
- (Serbia) Andrija Prlainović
- (Serbia) Nikola Rađen
- (Serbia) Marko Avramović
- (Serbia) Strahinja Rašović
- (Serbia) Viktor Rašović
- (Serbia) Sava Ranđelović
- (Serbia) Denis Šefik
- (Serbia) Veljko Tankosić
- (Serbia) Gavril Subotić
