= ZPC Het Ravijn =

Dutch water sports club

- Founded: 1961
- League: Dutch Championship
- Based in: Nijverdal
- Arena: ZSZC Het Ravijn
- Colors
- Championships: Women: 4 Dutch Championships; 8 Dutch Cups; Men: 1 Dutch Cup
- Website: http://www.zpc-hetravijn.nl/

Zwem en Polo Club Het Ravijn is a Dutch water sports club from Nijverdal founded in 1961. It is best known for its women's water polo team, which has won four national championships since 2000. It reached the final of the Women's LEN Trophy in 2006 and 2011, but it lost them against Budapest Honvéd and Rapallo respectively.

== Titles ==
- Men's water polo
  - Dutch Cup (1)
    - 1995
- Women's water polo
  - Dutch Championship (5)
    - 2000, 2003, 2008, 2012, 2013
  - Dutch Cup (8)
    - 1995, 1996, 1997, 1999, 2006, 2007, 2008, 2010

== Former internationals ==
Hellen Boering, Bert Brinkman, Rianne Guichelaar, Niels van der Kolk, Karin Kuipers, Meike de Nooy, Carla Quint, Yasemin Smit, Wyco de Vries, Lieke Schokker-Klaassen
