= ZVL Leiden =

Dutch swimming and water polo club

ZVL-1886 Leiden
- Founded: 2004
- League: Dutch Championship
- Based in: Leiden
- Arena: Zwembad De Zijl
- Colors
- President: Caspar Boendermaker
- Championships: European Cups; 1 Dutch Leagues; 2 Dutch Super Cups; 3 Dutch Cups
- Website: https://www.zvl-1886.nl/

With almost 1800 members, ZVL-1886 is the largest swimming club in Leiden and the surrounding area. ZVL-1886 stands for Zwem Vereniging Leiden and 1886 refers to the year that the first swimming club was founded in Leiden. ZVL-1886 was created in May 2018 after a merger between De Zijl Zwemsport and LZ-1886. The crest colors are red and blue.

In 1886 Mr H.A. van Ingen Schenau took the initiative to hold competitions among the visitors of swimming facility 'Rhijnzigt', located on the Galgewater. The first swimming competitions took place at the beginning of July. These competitions led to the foundation of the first Leiden Swimming Club (LZC), which took place on July 24, 1886 and had approximately 100 members.

Over the years, various clubs were founded in Leiden. De Zijl in 1922, De Leidse Golfbrekers in 1946. The history of swimming and water polo in Leiden has various mergers, such as the one between these two clubs in 1971. Vivax from Oegstgeest joined in 2003, but that was short-lived. Finally, everything was bundled together in ZVL-1886 via various detours.

Even before the official establishment of ZVL-1886, the women in particular achieved considerable success. In 2013-14 and 2015-16, the national title went to the Leiden water polo players. From 2012 to 2018, the national cup was won six times, a series that was only interrupted by UZSC in 2017. In 2013, '14, '16 and '19, the Supercup also ended up in the Leiden trophy cabinet. The men's team grew stronger in the competition during the last five years and achieved success. Led by coach Niels Joor in 2019, they became second in the Netherlands for the first time in the history of ZVL-1886. In 2022 they reached third place.

Despite many young, self-trained players, both teams participate in the top of the Dutch league.

== Honorary list ==
=== National ===
- Dutch Champion

2013-2014,
2015-2016

- Super Cup

2013, 2014, 2016, 2018

- KNZB beker 5x

2011-2012, 2012-2013, 2013-2014 2014-2015 2015-2016 2017-2018

- KNZB Beker 2 (ManMeer!-Cup)

2006-2007, 2012-2013, 2013-2014, 2014-2015

=== International ===
- Champions Cup

Final Four: 2007-2008

- LEN Trophy

Quarter Finals: 2010-2011, 2011–2012, 2012–2013

== Players ==
- Iefke van Belkum
- Jantien Cabout
- Mieke Cabout
- Biurakn Hakhverdian
- Anne Heinis
- Noeki Klein
- Ilse Koolhaas
- Kitty Lynn Joustra
