= SKIF-CSP Izmailovo =

Women's water polo team

- League: Russian Championship
- Based in: Moscow
- Colors
- Manager: Sergey Frolov
- Championships: 2 European Cups; 1 LEN Trophy; 4 Russian Championships
- Website: http://www.cspizmailovo.ru/en/water-polo/135

SKIF-CSP Izmailovo (Russian: СКИФ ШВСМ «Измайлово») is a Russian women's water polo team from Izmailovo, Moscow founded in 1991. Originally established as SKIF Moscow, it became a section of CSP Izmailovo in 2003.

The team enjoyed its golden era through the second half of the 1990s, winning two European Cups in 1997 and 1999 in addition to four consecutive national championships between 1995 and 1998. SKIF also reached the 1998 and 2000 European Cup's finals, but it lost them to Orizzonte Catania and ANO Glyfada, and in 2001 it won the LEN Trophy. Between 1999 and 2002 the team was the championship's runner-up, second to Uralochka Zlatoust, but its best results in subsequent years have been 3rd positions in 2004, 2006 and 2011.

== Titles ==
- LEN Champions' Cup (2)
  - 1997, 1999
- LEN Trophy (1)
  - 2001
- Russian Championship (5)
  - 1994, 1995, 1996, 1997, 1998
