= Associazione Sportiva Racing Sporting Club Nuoto Roma =

Associazione Sportiva Racing Sporting Club Nuoto Roma or simply Racing Roma is a water polo club based in Rome.

Racing Roma founded in 1976 by brothers Schembri, has participated in several professional leagues until 2008, when the men's water polo section merged with that of the S.S. Roma creating A.S. Roma Pallanuoto. In the season 2010- 2011 women's team plays in the Serie A2, the second division of the Italian league.

== Honours ==
men

LEN Cup Winners' Cup

- Winners (1): 1995–96
- Runners-up (1): 1996–97

LEN Euro Cup

- Winners (1): 1993–94

LEN Super Cup

- Runners-up (1): 1996

women

Women's LEN Trophy

- Winners (2): 2006–07, 2007–08
