= Uralochka Zlatoust =

Russian water polo club

- Founded: 1985
- League: Russian Championship
- Based in: Zlatoust
- Arena: COP Uralochka
- Colors
- Head coach: Mikhail Nakoryakov
- Championships: 1 Soviet League; 1 Soviet Cup; 5 Russian Leagues; 5 Russian Cups
- Website: http://waterpolozlat.ru

Uralochka-ZMZ Zlatoust (Russian: Динамо-Уралочка) is a Russian professional women's water polo club from Zlatoust.

Uralochka won the first edition of the Russian Championship in 1992, and it subsequently won four more titles between 1999 and 2002. She was also known to reach the finals of the European Cup in 2000. Between 1996-98 and 2004-08 she was awarded the championship's runner-up, second to SKIF Izmaylovo and Kinef Kirishi, respectively.

Most recently, Uralochka was 4th in the 2012 championship and reached the LEN Trophy's quarterfinals.

== Titles ==
- Soviet Championship
  - 1990
- Soviet Cup
  - 1989, 1990
- Russian Championship
  - 1992, 1999, 2000, 2001, 2002
- Russian Cup
  - 1992, 1999, 2000, 2002, 2006
