= RN Imperia =

Italian water polo club

- Founded: 1957
- League: (Italy) Serie A1
- Based in: Imperia, Italy
- Arena: Felipe Cascione, Imperia
- Colors
- President: Luca Ramone
- Manager: Marco Capanna
- Championships: 1 LEN Trophy
- Website: http://www.rarinantesimperia.it/

Rari Nantes Imperia is an Italian water polo club from Imperia founded in 1957. It is best known for its women's team, which in 2012 won the LEN Trophy and was the national championship's runner-up.

== Titles ==
- Women
  - LEN Trophy (1)
    - 2012

== 2012–13 squads ==
- Men
  - P — Vittorio Foroni, Eugenio Emmolo
  - D — Edoardo Grossi, Filippo Rocchi, Andi Shapka
  - CV — Andrea Amelio, Marco Capanna, Marco Giordano, Nicola Parodi, Riccardo Parodi
  - A — Matteo Emmolo, Daniele Ferrari, Giovani Merano, Giacomo Rocchi, Andrea Somà, Giacomo Strafforello, Simone Valente
  - CB — Filippo Corio, Stefano Frattoni, Andrea Poracchia
- Women
  - P — Valeria Costamagna, Giulia Gorlero, Cecilia Solaini
  - D — Elena Borriello, Laura Drocco, Francesca Pometi, Elena Russo
  - CV — Martina Bencardino, Mercédesz Stieber
  - A — Carla Carrega, Elisa Casanova, Giulia Emmolo, Gloria Gorlero, Maria Raissa Risivi, Anaid Ralat
