= European Aquatics Euro Cup =

Second-tier European water polo competition

- Current season, competition or edition: 2026–27 European Aquatics Euro Cup
- Formerly: LEN Trophy; LEN Euro Cup
- Sport: Water polo
- Founded: 1992
- President: Patrice Coste
- Country: European Aquatics members
- Continent: Europe
- Most recent champions: (France) Marseille (2nd title)
- Most titles: (Italy) Brescia (4 titles)
- Level on pyramid: 2nd Tier (Europe)
- Website: len.eu

The European Aquatics Euro Cup is the second-tier European water polo club competition run by the European Aquatics for those clubs who did not qualify for the European Aquatics Champions League. The cup was inaugurated in 1992. From 2024, after LEN was renamed to European Aquatics, the new name is the European Aquatics Euro Cup.

== History ==
=== Names of the competition ===
- 1992–2011: LEN Trophy
- 2011–2024: LEN Euro Cup
- 2024–present: European Aquatics Euro Cup

== Title holders ==

- 1992–93: (Hungary) Újpest
- 1993–94: (Italy) Racing Roma
- 1994–95: (Spain) Barcelona
- 1995–96: (Italy) Pescara
- 1996–97: (Hungary) Újpest
- 1997–98: (Federal Republic of Yugoslavia) Partizan
- 1998–99: (Hungary) Újpest
- 1999–00: (Croatia) Jug
- 2000–01: (Croatia) Mladost
- 2001–02: (Italy) Leonessa
- 2002–03: (Italy) Leonessa
- 2003–04: (Spain) Barcelona
- 2004–05: (Italy) Savona
- 2005–06: (Italy) Leonessa
- 2006–07: (Russia) Sintez Kazan
- 2007–08: (Russia) Shturm Chekhov
- 2008–09: (Hungary) Szeged
- 2009–10: (Montenegro) Cattaro
- 2010–11: (Italy) Savona
- 2011–12: (Italy) Savona
- 2012–13: (Serbia) Radnički Kragujevac
- 2013–14: (Russia) Spartak Volgograd
- 2014–15: (Italy) Posillipo
- 2015–16: (Italy) Brescia
- 2016–17: (Hungary) Ferencváros
- 2017–18: (Hungary) Ferencváros
- 2018–19: (France) Marseille
- 2019–20 Cancelled due to COVID-19 pandemic
- 2020–21: (Hungary) Szolnok
- 2021–22: (Spain) Sabadell
- 2022–23: (Hungary) Vasas
- 2023–24: (Croatia) Jug Dubrovnik
- 2024–25: (Italy) Pro Recco
- 2025–26: (France) Marseille

== Winners ==
LEN Trophy

Year	Final			Semi-finalists	
Year	Champion	Score	Second place		
1992–93; Details	(Hungary); Újpest	28–20 (12-7 / 16-13)	(Italy); Pro Recco	N / A	
1993–94; Details	(Italy); Racing Roma	23–21 (15-14 / 8-7)	(Italy); Volturno	N / A	
1994–95; Details	(Spain); Barcelona	18–15 (10-8 / 9-7)	(Hungary); Ferencváros	N / A	
1995–96; Details	(Italy); Pescara	28–20 (10-9 / 18-11)	(Hungary); Szeged	N / A	
1996–97; Details	(Hungary); Újpest	22–19 (10-8 / 12-11 aet)	(Hungary); Ferencváros	(Croatia); Jug Dubrovnik	(Italy); Savona
1997–98; Details	(Federal Republic of Yugoslavia); Partizan	11–9 (8-8 / 3-1)	(Croatia); Jadran Split	(Hungary); Vasas	(Italy); Florentia
1998–99; Details	(Hungary); Újpest	21–17 (12-7 / 9-10)	(Greece); Patras	(Croatia); Jug Dubrovnik	(Spain); Real Canoe
1999–00; Details	(Croatia); Jug Dubrovnik	18–15 (8-7 / 10-6)	(Italy); Pescara	(Spain); Atlètic-Barceloneta	(Hungary); Vasas
2000–01; Details	(Croatia); Mladost	16–14 (7-8 / 9-6)	(Italy); Leonessa	(Hungary); Vasas	(Greece); Vouliagmeni
2001–02; Details	(Italy); Leonessa	15–13 (7-8 / 8-5)	(Italy); Pro Recco	(Hungary); BVSC	(Federal Republic of Yugoslavia); Partizan
2002–03; Details	(Italy); Leonessa	N / A	(Italy); Florentia	(Greece); Ethnikos Piraeus	(Italy); Savona
2003–04; Details	(Spain); Barcelona	21–16 (11-11 / 11-5)	(Greece); Vouliagmeni	(Croatia); Jadran Split	(Serbia and Montenegro); Niš
2004–05; Details	(Italy); Savona	13–11 (6-7 / 7-4)	(Serbia and Montenegro); Partizan	(Greece); Panionios	(Serbia and Montenegro); Primorac Kotor
2005–06; Details	(Italy); Leonessa	17–15 (11-8 / 6-7)	(Russia); Sintez Kazan	(Russia); Dynamo Moscow	(Hungary); Ferencváros
2006–07; Details	(Russia); Sintez Kazan	21–20 (12-10 / 9-10)	(Croatia); Šibenik	(Montenegro); Budva	(Italy); Bissolati Cremona
2007–08; Details	(Russia); Shturm Chekhov	20–15 (8-8 / 12-7)	(Hungary); Eger	(Montenegro); Budva	(Spain); Terrassa
2008–09; Details	(Hungary); Szeged	23–21 (6-8 / 17-13 pen)	(Greece); Panionios	(Spain); Barcelona	(Russia); Sintez Kazan
2009–10; Details	(Montenegro); Cattaro	15–14 (7-9 / 8-5 aet)	(Italy); Savona	(Italy); Leonessa	(Germany); Spandau 04
2010–11; Details	(Italy); Savona	20–12 (9-9 / 11-3)	(Greece); Panionios	(Hungary); Bp. Honvéd	(France); Marseille

LEN Euro Cup

Year	Final			Semi-finalists	
Year	Champion	Score	Second place		
2011–12; Details	(Italy); Savona	20–17 (14-9 / 6-8)	(Spain); Sabadell	(Italy); Posillipo	(Hungary); Szolnok
2012–13; Details	(Serbia); Radnički Kragujevac	15–10 (8-4 / 7-6)	(Italy); Florentia	(Italy); Savona	(Hungary); Debrecen
2013–14; Details	(Russia); Spartak Volgograd	16–14 (11-5 / 5-9)	(Croatia); Mladost	(Italy); Acquachiara	(Italy); Posillipo
2014–15; Details	(Italy); Posillipo	17–16 (6-6 / 11-10)	(Italy); Acquachiara	(Romania); Steaua București	(Croatia); Mornar
2015–16; Details	(Italy); Brescia	23–10 (11-4 / 12-6)	(Russia); Sintez Kazan	(Hungary); Szeged	(Croatia); Mornar
2016–17; Details	(Hungary); Ferencváros	19–13 (12-6 / 7-7)	(Romania); CSM Oradea	(Montenegro); Jadran Herceg Novi	(Italy); SM Verona
2017–18; Details	(Hungary); Ferencváros	17–13 (9-8 / 8-5)	(Italy); SM Verona	(France); Marseille	(Hungary); Miskolc
2018–19; Details	(France); Marseille	16–15 (9-8 / 7-7)	(Montenegro); Jadran Herceg Novi	(Hungary); OSC Budapest	(Italy); Ortigia
2019–20; Details	Cancelled due to the COVID-19 pandemic.			Cancelled due to the COVID-19 pandemic.	
2020–21; Details	(Hungary); Szolnok	25–22 (14-11 / 11-11 pen.)	(Hungary); OSC Budapest	(Greece); Vouliagmeni	(Serbia); Crvena zvezda
2021–22; Details	(Spain); Sabadell	18–14 (7–9 / 11–5)	(Italy); Telimar Palermo	(Spain); Barcelona	(Italy); Ortigia
2022–23; Details	(Hungary); Vasas	23–15 (8–8 / 15–7)	(Italy); Savona	(Italy); Trieste	(Greece); Panionios
2023–24; Details	(Croatia); Jug Dubrovnik	12–6	(Croatia); Primorje	(Spain); Sabadell	(Germany); Spandau 04 Berlin

European Aquatics Euro Cup

Year	Final			Semi-finalists	
Year	Champion	Score	Second place		
2024–25; Details	(Italy); Pro Recco	28–21 (16–12 / 12–9)	(Serbia); Radnički Kragujevac	(Croatia); Mladost	(Spain); Sabadell
2025–26; Details	(France); Marseille	33–32 (19–16 / 14–16)	(Croatia); Jadran Split	(Serbia); Radnički Kragujevac	(Hungary); BVSC-Manna ABC

== Titles by club ==
Rank	Club	Titles	Runner-up	Champion years
1.	(Italy) Brescia	4	1	2001–02, 2002–03, 2005–06, 2015–16
2.	(Italy) Savona	3	2	2004–05, 2010–11, 2011–12
3.	(Hungary) Újpest	3		1992–93, 1996–97, 1998–99
4.	(Hungary) Ferencváros	2	2	2016–17, 2017–18
5.	(Spain) Barcelona	2		1994–95, 2003–04
–	(Croatia) Jug	2		1999–00, 2023–24
–	(France) Marseille	2		2018–19, 2025–26
8.	(Russia) Sintez Kazan	1	2	2006–07
–	(Italy) Pro Recco	1	2	2024–25
10.	(Italy) Pescara	1	1	1995–96
–	(Serbia and Montenegro) Partizan	1	1	1997–98
–	(Croatia) Mladost	1	1	2000–01
–	(Hungary) Szeged	1	1	2008–09
–	(Spain) Sabadell	1	1	2021–22
15.	(Serbia) Radnički Kragujevac	1	1	2012–13
16.	(Italy) Racing Roma	1		1993–94
–	(Russia) Shturm Chekhov	1		2007–08
–	(Montenegro) Cattaro	1		2009–10
–	(Russia) Spartak Volgograd	1		2013–14
–	(Italy) Posillipo	1		2014–15
–	(Hungary) Szolnok	1		2020–21
–	(Hungary) Vasas	1		2022–23
23.	(Italy) Florentia		2
–	(Greece) Panionios		2
–	(Croatia) Jadran Split		2
26.	(Italy) Volturno		1
–	(Greece) NO Patras		1
–	(Greece) Vouliagmeni		1
–	(Croatia) Šibenik		1
–	(Hungary) Eger		1
–	(Italy) Acquachiara		1
–	(Romania) Oradea		1
–	(Italy) Sport Management		1
–	(Montenegro) Jadran Herceg Novi		1
–	(Hungary) OSC Budapest		1
–	(Italy) Telimar Palermo		1
–	(Croatia) Primorje		1

== Titles by nation ==
Rank	Country	Titles	Runners-up
1.	Italy	11	12
2.	Hungary	8	5
3.	Croatia	3	5
4.	Russia	3	2
5.	Spain	3	1
6.	France	2
7.	(Serbia and Montenegro) Serbia & Montenegro	1	1
	Montenegro	1	1
	Serbia	1	1
10.	Greece		4

== See also ==
=== Men ===
- European Aquatics Champions League
- European Aquatics Conference Cup
- European Aquatics Challenger Cup
- European Aquatics Super Cup

=== Women ===
- European Aquatics Women's Champions League
- European Aquatics Women's Euro Cup
- European Aquatics Women's Conference Cup
- European Aquatics Women's Challenger Cup
- European Aquatics Women's Super Cup
