= Spartak Volgograd =

Russian water polo club

- League: Russian Championship
- Based in: Volgograd
- Manager: Vladimir Karabutov
- Local media: http://spartak-volgograd.com

Spartak Volgograd (Russian: Спартак Волгоград) is a men's and women's water polo club based in the city of Volgograd, Russia.

== History (men's team) ==
Spartak Volgograd was founded in 1994. However, the water polo department was established two years later. Spartak was succeeding right after its foundation, winning the title of the Russian Championship in 1997 and finishing in second place in 1998. Furthermore, the club became fourth at the LEN Champions League during that period. Spartak won the 2013–14 LEN Euro Cup, a European second-tier club competition.

== Titles and achievements (men's team) ==
=== Domestic competitions ===
Russian League

- Winners (12): 1996–97, 1998–99, 2002–03, 2003–04, 2009–10, 2010–11, 2011–12, 2012–13, 2013–14, 2014–15, 2015–16, 2016–17

=== European competitions ===
LEN Champions League

- 4th place (1): 1997–98

LEN Euro Cup

- Winners (1): 2013–14
