= Sintez Kazan =

Russian professional water polo club

WPC Sintez Kazan
- Founded: 1974
- League: Russian Championship
- Based in: Kazan
- Arena: «Orgsintez»
- Colors
- President: Shaikh Gaifutdinov Gilazoich
- Head coach: Revaz Chomakhidze
- Website: sintez-kazan.ru

Sintez is a Russian professional water polo club from Kazan, Russia. The club was formed in 1974 and plays in Russia's highest division since 1993. Former Russian centar forward Andrey Belofastov is head coach.

== Accomplishments ==
- Russian Water Polo Championship
  - (gold) (4) — 2006–07, 2019–20, 2020–21, 2021–22;
  - (silver) (8) — 2005–06, 2007–08, 2009–10, 2011–12, 2012–13, 2013–14, 2015–16, 2016–17;
  - (bronze) (4) — 2004–05, 2009–09, 2010–11, 2017–18;
- Russian Cup
  - (gold) (4) — 2005, 2010, 2021, 2022;
- LEN Cup
  - (gold) (1) — 2006–07;
  - (silver) (2) — 2005–06, 2015–16;

== Prominent players ==
- Andrey Belofastov — 2004–09;
- Irek Zinnourov — 2004–09;
- Marat Zakirov — 2005–10;
- Nikolay Maksimov — 2005–11;
- Dejan Savić — 2005–10;
- Danilo Ikodinović — 2006–08.
