= Shturm Ruza =

Russian water polo club

- Founded: 2002
- League: Russian Championship; Russian Women's Chp.
- Based in: Ruza
- Colors
- Championships: Men: 1 LEN Trophy; 4 Russian Leagues; Women: 1 LEN Trophy
- Website: http://wpcshturm2002.ru/

Shturm-2002 Moskovskaya Oblast, a.k.a. Shturm Ruza, is a Russian water polo club. Founded in 2002 in Chekhov, Moscow Oblast, in 2010 it was relocated to Ruza, also in the Moscow Oblast.

Shturm Chekhov's male team won four national championships plus the 2008 LEN Trophy between the years 2005 and 2009. The female team was the national championship's runner-up between 2009 and 2011 and like its male counterpart, it won the Women's LEN Trophy one year later. In the 2011–12 season the male and female teams were defeated in the LEN Trophy's Round of 16 and the European Cup's quarter-finals respectively.

== Titles ==
- Russian Water Polo Championship
  - (gold) (4) — 2004–05, 2005–06, 2007–08, 2008–09;
  - (silver) (4) — 2002–03, 2003–04, 2006–07, 2010–11;
  - (bronze) (3) — 2009–10, 2011–12, 2012–13;
- LEN Cup
  - (gold) (1) — 2007–08;
- Women
  - LEN Trophy
    - (gold) (1) — 2008–09;
