= 2010–11 LEN Women's Champions' Cup =

Water polo tournament

The 2010–11 LEN Women's Champions' Cup was the 24th edition of the highest-level competition in women's European club water polo. It involved the champions and other top teams from European national leagues and ran from December 2010 to April 2011. The Final Four (semifinals, final, and third place game) took place in Sabadell, Spain.

Final Four host CN Sabadell became the first Spanish team to win the competition beating Orizzonte Catania in the final. Olympiacos CFP and Kinef Kirishi also reached the final Four, with Olympiacos ranking third, while defending champion Vouliagmeni OC was defeated by Orizzonte in the quarter-finals.

== Federation team allocation ==
Each national federation can enter up to two teams into the Women's Champions' Cup.

- Seeded Federations are the federations who placed a team in the final Four of the previous' year's competition. In 2009/10, these countries were: Greece (2), Italy, and Russia
- All other federations are unseeded

Federations do not have to enter their top two teams into the Champions' Cup. If they do not think their clubs can be competitive, they can enter teams into the second-tier LEN Cup.

== Format and Changes ==
The original format for the Champions' Cup was to have four phases:

- A qualification round of 4 groups of any size played as a Round-robin tournament at the site of a host team
- A preliminary round of 4 groups of 4 played as a Round-robin tournament at the site of a host team
- A quarterfinal round played as a Two-legged tie
- The Final Four played as a Knockout tournament at a pre-selected site

However, there were only 13 entries, so the qualification round was cancelled, and the preliminary round will be played with 3 groups of 3 and 1 group of 4.

=== Distribution ===
| | Teams entering in this round | Teams advancing from previous round |
|---|---|---|
| **Preliminary Round** | 1 or 2 teams from each federation | |
| **Knockout Phase** **(8 teams)** | | 4 tournament winners from the preliminary round; 4 tournament runner-up from the preliminary round |

=== Teams ===
There were 13 entries from 7 countries. Each of the draw pots were organised according to the previous year's results:
Bold indicates countries that entered teams

| **Pot 1** | Final Four qualifiers | **Greece (2), Italy, Russia** |
| **Pot 2** | Losing quarterfinalists | **Italy, Russia, Spain (2)** |
| **Pot 3** | 3rd placed in preliminary round | **Germany**, Hungary, **Netherlands (2)** |
| **Pot 4** | 4th placed in preliminary round | **France**, Great Britain (2), Switzerland |

Note: The Netherlands only entered one team, so the two available places in Pot 3 were taken by a second German team and a French team elevated from Pot 4.

| Draw | Group A | Group B | Group C | Group D |
|---|---|---|---|---|
| Pot 1 | (Italy) Orizzonte Catania | (Russia) Kinef Kirishi | (Greece) Olympiacos CFP | (Greece) Vouliagmeni OC |
| Pot 2 | (Spain) CN Sabadell | (Spain) CE Mediterrani | (Russia) Shturm Ruza | (Italy) Fiorentina WP |
| Pot 3 | (Germany) Blau-Weiss Bochum | (Germany) Bayer Uerdingen | (France) Olympic Nice | (Netherlands) Polar Bears Ede |
| Pot 4 | | | | (France) ASPTT Nancy |

== Round and Draw Dates ==
| Tournament Phase | Draw Date | Tournament | |
|---|---|---|---|
| Preliminary Round | 6 August 2010 | Ends 5 December 2010 | |
| Knockout Phase | Draw Date | 1st Leg | 2nd Leg |
| Quarterfinals | | 12–13 February 2011 | 19–20 March 2011 |
| Final Four | Draw Date | Round Date | |
| Semifinals | | 22 April 2011 | |
| Final | | 23 April 2011 | |

== Tournament Phase ==
=== First qualifying round ===
Key to colours in group tables
Progress to the Quarterfinal Round

==== Group A ====
| | Team | PL | W | D | L | F | A | Pts |
|---|---|---|---|---|---|---|---|---|
| 1. | (Spain) Sabadell | 2 | 2 | 0 | 0 | 26 | 20 | 6 |
| 2. | (Italy) Orizzonte Catania (host) | 2 | 1 | 0 | 1 | 30 | 25 | 3 |
| 3. | (Germany) Blau-Weiss Bochum | 2 | 0 | 0 | 2 | 18 | 29 | 0 |

14 January 2011
| Sabadell | 12–7 | Blau-Weiss Bochum |
15 January 2011
| Sabadell | 14–13 | Orizzonte Catania |
16 January 2011
| Orizzonte Catania | 17–11 | Blau-Weiss Bochum |

==== Group B ====
| | Team | PL | W | D | L | F | A | Pts |
|---|---|---|---|---|---|---|---|---|
| 1. | (Russia) Kinef Kirishi (host) | 2 | 2 | 0 | 0 | 42 | 16 | 6 |
| 2. | (Germany) Bayer Uerdingen | 2 | 1 | 0 | 1 | 30 | 33 | 0 |
| 3. | (Spain) Mediterrani | 2 | 0 | 0 | 2 | 17 | 40 | 0 |

14 January 2011
| Bayer Uerdingen | 20–11 | Mediterrani |
15 January 2011
| Kinef Kirishi | 22–10 | Bayer Uerdingen |
16 January 2011
| Kinef Kirishi | 20–6 | Mediterrani |

==== Group C ====
| | Team | PL | W | D | L | F | A | Pts |
|---|---|---|---|---|---|---|---|---|
| 1. | (Greece) Olympiacos | 2 | 2 | 0 | 0 | 25 | 15 | 6 |
| 2. | (Russia) Shturm Ruza | 2 | 1 | 0 | 1 | 26 | 19 | 3 |
| 3. | (France) Olympic Nice (host) | 2 | 0 | 0 | 2 | 11 | 28 | 0 |

14 January 2011
| Olympiacos | 13–4 | Olympic Nice |
15 January 2011
| Olympiacos | 12–11 | Shturm Ruza |
16 January 2011
| Shturm Ruza | 15–7 | Olympic Nice |

==== Group D ====
| | Team | PL | W | D | L | F | A | Pts |
|---|---|---|---|---|---|---|---|---|
| 1. | (Greece) Vouliagmeni | 3 | 3 | 0 | 0 | 43 | 17 | 9 |
| 2. | (Netherlands) Polar Bears Ede | 3 | 2 | 0 | 1 | 31 | 30 | 6 |
| 3. | (Italy) Fiorentina (host) | 3 | 1 | 0 | 2 | 24 | 28 | 3 |
| 4. | (France) Nancy | 3 | 0 | 0 | 3 | 19 | 42 | 0 |

14 January 2011
| Vouliagmeni | 15–6 | Polar Bears Ede |
| Fiorentina | 11–6 | Nancy |
15 January 2011
| Vouliagmeni | 17–6 | Nancy |
| Polar Bears Ede | 11–8 | Fiorentina |
16 January 2011
| Vouliagmeni | 11–5 | Fiorentina |
| Polar Bears Ede | 14–7 | Nancy |

== Quarter-finals ==
| Team #1 | Agg. | Team #2 | L #1 | L #2 |
|---|---|---|---|---|
| Sabadell (Spain) | 22–19 | (Russia) Shturm Ruza | 16–8 | 6–11 |
| Polar Bears Ede (Netherlands) | 18–26 | (Russia) Kinef Kirishi | 9–11 | 9–15 |
| Vouliagmeni (Greece) | 21–23 | (Italy) Orizzonte Catania | 13–11 | 8–12 |
| Bayer Uerdingen (Germany) | 14–35 | (Greece) Olympiacos | 8–18 | 6–17 |

== Final four ==
- Piscina Can Llong, Sabadell

Semi-finals
22 April
(Spain) Sabadell | 15
(Russia) Kinef Kirishi | 13
22 April
(Italy) Orizzonte Catania | 14
(Greece) Olympiacos | 13

Final
23 April
(Spain) Sabadell | 13
(Italy) Orizzonte Catania | 8
Third place
23 April
(Russia) Kinef Kirishi | 12
(Greece) Olympiacos | 14

2011 LEN Women's Champions' Cup Champions

CN Sabadell
First title
