= 2014 Women's LEN Super Cup =

Water polo match

The 2014 Women's LEN Super Cup was a water polo match organized by LEN and contested by the reigning champions of the two main European club competitions, the 2013–14 LEN Women's Champions' Cup and the 2013-14 Women's LEN Trophy.

== Squads ==
The two squads were Olympiacos Piraeus and CN Sabadell Astralpool.

=== Olympiacos Piraeus ===
| No. | Name | Date of birth | Position | Height |
|---|---|---|---|---|
| 1 | (Greece) Chrysoula Diamantopoulou | September 22, 1995 | Goalkeeper | 185 |
| 2 | (Greece) Evdokia Tetzalidou | February 21, 1990 | Centre back | 170 |
| 3 | (Greece) Eleftheria Plevritou | April 23, 1997 | Driver | 178 |
| 4 | (Greece) Maria Sora | June 10, 1994 | Driver | 162 |
| 5 | (Greece) Triantafyllia Manolioudaki | March 19, 1986 | Driver | 170 |
| 6 | (Greece) Alkisti Avramidou | February 26, 1988 | Driver | 170 |
| 7 | (Greece) Alexandra Asimaki | June 28, 1988 | Centre forward | 175 |
| 8 | (Greece) Margarita Plevritou | November 17, 1994 | Centre back | 179 |
| 9 | (Greece) Michaela Kalogerakou | July 10, 1998 | Driver | 165 |
| 10 | (Australia) Ashleigh Southern | October 22, 1992 | Driver | 188 |
| 11 | (Italy) Roberta Bianconi | July 8, 1989 | Driver | 177 |
| 12 | (Greece) Virginia Niarchakou | December 5, 1996 | Centre forward | 168 |
| 13 | (Greece) Ioanna Stamatopoulou | June 27, 1998 | Goalkeeper | 185 |
| 14 | (Greece) Vasiliki Plevritou | June 8, 1998 | | |

Head coach: Charis Pavlidis

=== CN Sabadell Astralpool ===
| No. | Name | Date of birth | Position | Height |
|---|---|---|---|---|
| 1 | (Spain) Laura Ester | January 22, 1990 | Goalkeeper | 170 |
| 2 | (Spain) Matilde Ortiz | September 16, 1990 | Centre back | 174 |
| 3 | (Spain) Anni Espar | January 8, 1993 | Driver | 180 |
| 4 | (Netherlands) Dagmar Genee | January 31, 1989 | Driver | 178 |
| 5 | (Spain) Carla Abellán | July 31, 1997 | | 175 |
| 6 | (Spain) Jennifer Pareja | May 8, 1984 | Driver | 175 |
| 7 | (Spain) Marina Cordobés | April 28, 1997 | Left wing | |
| 8 | (Spain) Maica García | October 17, 1990 | Centre forward | 188 |
| 9 | (Spain) María del Pilar Peña | April 4, 1986 | Right wing | 174 |
| 10 | (United States) Melissa Seidemann | June 26, 1990 | Centre forward | 183 |
| 11 | (Spain) Olga Doménech | September 21, 1988 | Left wing | 168 |
| 12 | (Spain) Judith Forca | June 7, 1996 | Right wing | 173 |
| 13 | (Spain) Elena Sanchez | October 22, 1994 | Goalkeeper | 178 |
| 14 | (Spain) Lidia Casado | January 30, 1998 | | |

Head coach: Ignasi Guiu
