= 2018 Women's European Water Polo Championship squads =

This article shows all participating team squads at the 2018 Women's European Water Polo Championship, held in Spain from 14 to 27 July 2018.

Ages as of 14 July 2018.

== Group A ==
=== Croatia ===
Head coach: Dragan Matutinović

| No | Name | Date of birth | Position | L/R | Height | Weight | Club |
|---|---|---|---|---|---|---|---|
| 1 | Alexandra Ratković | 22 August 2000 (aged 17) | Goalkeeper | R | 1.71 m (5 ft 7 in) | 74 kg (163 lb) | (Croatia) VK Primorje |
| 2 | Emmi Miljković | 2 September 1988 (aged 29) | Field player | R | 1.74 m (5 ft 9 in) | 70 kg (150 lb) | (Italy) Lerici Sport 1954 |
| 3 | Mia Topić | 13 May 2001 (aged 17) | Defender | R | 1.74 m (5 ft 9 in) | 75 kg (165 lb) | (Croatia) HAVK Mladost |
| 4 | Tereza Balić | 4 June 1998 (aged 20) | Centre forward | R | 1.76 m (5 ft 9 in) | 96 kg (212 lb) | (Croatia) HAVK Mladost |
| 5 | Dina Lordan (C) | 20 September 1994 (aged 23) | Wing | R | 1.70 m (5 ft 7 in) | 64 kg (141 lb) | (Croatia) HAVK Mladost |
| 6 | Matea Skelin | 24 February 1997 (aged 21) | Centre back | R | 1.78 m (5 ft 10 in) | 76 kg (168 lb) | (Croatia) HAVK Mladost |
| 7 | Gloria Badžim | 20 August 1999 (aged 18) | Wing | R | 1.80 m (5 ft 11 in) | 67 kg (148 lb) | (Croatia) ŽVK Viktoria |
| 8 | Domina Butić | 10 August 2000 (aged 17) | Wing | R | 1.63 m (5 ft 4 in) | 63 kg (139 lb) | (Croatia) OVK POŠK Split |
| 9 | Petra Bukić | 29 September 1988 (aged 29) | Wing | R | 1.78 m (5 ft 10 in) | 68 kg (150 lb) | (Croatia) HAVK Mladost |
| 10 | Ivana Butić | 7 March 1996 (aged 22) | Wing | R | 1.60 m (5 ft 3 in) | 58 kg (128 lb) | (Croatia) OVK POŠK Split |
| 11 | Leonarda Pavić | 26 January 1999 (aged 19) | Wing | R | 1.71 m (5 ft 7 in) | 60 kg (130 lb) | (Croatia) OVK POŠK Split |
| 12 | Lea Saftić | 20 January 1999 (aged 19) | Wing | R | 1.71 m (5 ft 7 in) | 73 kg (161 lb) | (Croatia) VK Primorje |
| 13 | Irena Barišić | 11 August 1992 (aged 25) | Goalkeeper | R | 1.77 m (5 ft 10 in) | 70 kg (150 lb) | (Croatia) OVK POŠK Split |

=== France ===
Head coach: Florian Bruzzo

| No | Name | Date of birth | Position | L/R | Height | Weight | Club |
|---|---|---|---|---|---|---|---|
| 1 | Morgane Chabrier | 17 October 1993 (aged 24) | Goalkeeper | R | 1.63 m (5 ft 4 in) | 53 kg (117 lb) | (France) Lille Métropole Water-Polo |
| 2 | Estelle Millot (C) | 21 December 1993 (aged 24) | All-round | R | 1.64 m (5 ft 5 in) | 53 kg (117 lb) | (France) Olympic Nice |
| 3 | Léa Bachelier | 13 February 1993 (aged 25) | Defender | R | 1.78 m (5 ft 10 in) | 60 kg (130 lb) | (France) Olympic Nice |
| 4 | Marie Barbieux | 12 August 1991 (aged 26) | Defender | R | 1.80 m (5 ft 11 in) | 80 kg (180 lb) | (France) Olympic Nice |
| 5 | Louise Guillet | 31 January 1986 (aged 32) | All-round | R | 1.83 m (6 ft 0 in) | 58 kg (128 lb) | (France) USB Bordeaux |
| 6 | Géraldine Mahieu | 15 September 1993 (aged 24) | Centre forward | R | 1.88 m (6 ft 2 in) | 85 kg (187 lb) | (Hungary) Dunaújvárosi FVE |
| 7 | Clementine Valverde | 23 September 1992 (aged 25) | Wing | R | 1.65 m (5 ft 5 in) | 59 kg (130 lb) | (France) USB Bordeaux |
| 8 | Aurélie Battu | 18 September 1997 (aged 20) | Field player | R | 1.81 m (5 ft 11 in) | 75 kg (165 lb) | (France) USB Bordeaux |
| 9 | Yaëlle Deschampt | 28 April 1997 (aged 21) | Defender | R | 1.71 m (5 ft 7 in) | 65 kg (143 lb) | (France) Lille Métropole Water-Polo |
| 10 | Laurine Bacquet | 30 January 1997 (aged 21) | Wing | L | 1.70 m (5 ft 7 in) | 69 kg (152 lb) | (France) Olympic Nice |
| 11 | Amandine Paillat | 30 July 1991 (aged 26) | Defender | R | 1.73 m (5 ft 8 in) | 67 kg (148 lb) | (France) Olympic Nice |
| 12 | Audrey Daule | 6 May 1993 (aged 25) | All-round | R | 1.64 m (5 ft 5 in) | 62 kg (137 lb) | (France) USB Bordeaux |
| 13 | Lorène Derenty | 4 September 1994 (aged 23) | Goalkeeper | R | 1.69 m (5 ft 7 in) | 62 kg (137 lb) | (France) USB Bordeaux |

=== Greece ===
Head coach: Giorgos Morfesis

| No | Name | Date of birth | Position | L/R | Height | Weight | Club |
|---|---|---|---|---|---|---|---|
| 1 | Chrysi Diamantopoulou | 22 September 1995 (aged 22) | Goalkeeper | L | 1.83 m (6 ft 0 in) | 70 kg (150 lb) | (Greece) Olympiacos |
| 2 | Christina Tsoukala | 8 July 1991 (aged 27) | Field player | R | 1.84 m (6 ft 0 in) | 73 kg (161 lb) | (Greece) Olympiacos |
| 3 | Vasiliki Diamantopoulou | 12 March 1993 (aged 25) | Defender | R | 1.80 m (5 ft 11 in) | 73 kg (161 lb) | (Greece) NC Vouliagmeni |
| 4 | Nikoleta Eleftheriadou | 17 January 1998 (aged 20) | Wing | R | 1.72 m (5 ft 8 in) | 66 kg (146 lb) | (Greece) Olympiacos |
| 5 | Margarita Plevritou | 17 November 1994 (aged 23) | Defender | R | 1.79 m (5 ft 10 in) | 70 kg (150 lb) | (Greece) Olympiacos |
| 6 | Alkisti Avramidou | 26 February 1988 (aged 30) | Field player | R | 1.70 m (5 ft 7 in) | 59 kg (130 lb) | (Greece) Olympiacos |
| 7 | Alexandra Asimaki (C) | 28 June 1988 (aged 30) | Centre forward | R | 1.70 m (5 ft 7 in) | 65 kg (143 lb) | (Greece) Olympiacos |
| 8 | Ioanna Chydirioti | 15 April 1997 (aged 21) | Field player | R | 1.77 m (5 ft 10 in) | 67 kg (148 lb) | (Greece) NC Vouliagmeni |
| 9 | Maria Patra | 17 October 1998 (aged 19) | Defender | R | 1.82 m (6 ft 0 in) | 69 kg (152 lb) | (Greece) NC Vouliagmeni |
| 10 | Elisavet Protopapas | 27 March 1999 (aged 19) | Field player | R | 1.69 m (5 ft 7 in) | 62 kg (137 lb) | (United States) California Golden Bears |
| 11 | Eleftheria Plevritou | 23 April 1997 (aged 21) | Field player | R | 1.79 m (5 ft 10 in) | 68 kg (150 lb) | (Greece) Olympiacos |
| 12 | Eleni Xenaki | 5 July 1997 (aged 21) | Centre forward | L | 1.76 m (5 ft 9 in) | 79 kg (174 lb) | (Greece) NC Vouliagmeni |
| 13 | Ioanna Stamatopoulou | 17 June 1998 (aged 20) | Goalkeeper | R | 1.85 m (6 ft 1 in) | 69 kg (152 lb) | (Greece) Olympiacos |

=== Israel ===
Head coach: Dimitrios Mavrotas

| No | Name | Date of birth | Position | L/R | Height | Weight | Club |
|---|---|---|---|---|---|---|---|
| 1 | Ayelet Peres | 27 March 1992 (aged 26) | Goalkeeper | R | 1.70 m (5 ft 7 in) | 64 kg (141 lb) | (Israel) ASA Tel Aviv |
| 2 | Miriam Bogachenko | 29 July 2002 (aged 15) | All-round | R | 1.77 m (5 ft 10 in) | 70 kg (150 lb) | (Israel) Hapoel Petah Tikva |
| 3 | Eden Tal | 8 December 2000 (aged 17) | Wing | R | 1.67 m (5 ft 6 in) | 52 kg (115 lb) | (Israel) Hapoel Yoqneam |
| 4 | Maya Shechori | 10 December 1999 (aged 18) | Wing | R | 1.58 m (5 ft 2 in) | 58 kg (128 lb) | (Israel) Hapoel Yoqneam |
| 5 | Kerem Noy | 9 December 1999 (aged 18) | Centre forward | R | 1.66 m (5 ft 5 in) | 72 kg (159 lb) | (Israel) Hapoel Petah Tikva |
| 6 | Semone Futorian | 27 November 2000 (aged 17) | Centre back | R | 1.77 m (5 ft 10 in) | 72 kg (159 lb) | (Israel) Hapoel Petah Tikva |
| 7 | Shunit Strugo (C) | 7 January 1987 (aged 31) | All-round | R | 1.70 m (5 ft 7 in) | 58 kg (128 lb) | (Israel) Hapoel Yoqneam |
| 8 | Lior Ben David | 15 March 1998 (aged 20) | Wing | R | 1.70 m (5 ft 7 in) | 60 kg (130 lb) | (Israel) Hapoel Yoqneam |
| 9 | Inbar Barnea | 21 June 1995 (aged 23) | Wing | R | 1.63 m (5 ft 4 in) | 57 kg (126 lb) | (Israel) Hapoel Yoqneam |
| 10 | Mackenzie Mone | 4 December 1990 (aged 27) | Centre forward | R | 1.76 m (5 ft 9 in) | 77 kg (170 lb) | (Spain) CN Catalunya |
| 11 | Nofar Hochberg | 4 August 2001 (aged 16) | All-round | R | 1.68 m (5 ft 6 in) | 58 kg (128 lb) | (Israel) Hapoel Qiryat Tivon |
| 12 | Abigail Felix | 12 June 1999 (aged 19) | Centre forward | R | 1.74 m (5 ft 9 in) | 80 kg (180 lb) | (Israel) Hapoel Yoqneam |
| 13 | Inbar Geva | 19 March 1998 (aged 20) | Goalkeeper | R | 1.75 m (5 ft 9 in) | 59 kg (130 lb) | (Israel) Hapoel Yoqneam |

=== Italy ===
Head coach: Fabio Conti

| No | Name | Date of birth | Position | L/R | Height | Weight | Club |
|---|---|---|---|---|---|---|---|
| 1 | Giulia Gorlero | 26 September 1990 (aged 27) | Goalkeeper | R | 1.79 m (5 ft 10 in) | 70 kg (150 lb) | (Italy) A.S.D. Cosenza Nuoto |
| 2 | Chiara Tabani | 27 August 1994 (aged 23) | Defender | R | 1.76 m (5 ft 9 in) | 73 kg (161 lb) | (Italy) SIS Roma |
| 3 | Arianna Garibotti | 9 December 1989 (aged 28) | Field player | R | 1.69 m (5 ft 7 in) | 71 kg (157 lb) | (Italy) AS Orizzonte Catania |
| 4 | Silvia Avegno | 15 June 1997 (aged 21) | Field player | | 1.73 m (5 ft 8 in) | 66 kg (146 lb) | (Italy) Rapallo Pallanuoto |
| 5 | Elisa Queirolo (C) | 6 March 1991 (aged 27) | Wing | R | 1.68 m (5 ft 6 in) | 63 kg (139 lb) | (Italy) CS Plebiscito Padova |
| 6 | Rosaria Aiello | 12 May 1989 (aged 29) | Field player | R | 1.74 m (5 ft 9 in) | 74 kg (163 lb) | (Italy) AS Orizzonte Catania |
| 7 | Domitilla Picozzi | 5 June 1998 (aged 20) | Wing | R | 1.72 m (5 ft 8 in) | 67 kg (148 lb) | (Italy) SIS Roma |
| 8 | Roberta Bianconi | 8 July 1989 (aged 29) | Field player | R | 1.75 m (5 ft 9 in) | 76 kg (168 lb) | (Italy) AS Orizzonte Catania |
| 9 | Giulia Emmolo | 16 October 1991 (aged 26) | Wing | R | 1.72 m (5 ft 8 in) | 66 kg (146 lb) | (Greece) Olympiacos |
| 10 | Valeria Palmieri | 18 October 1993 (aged 24) | Centre forward | R | 1.76 m (5 ft 9 in) | 102 kg (225 lb) | (Italy) AS Orizzonte Catania |
| 11 | Arianna Gragnolati | 4 September 1996 (aged 21) | Field player | R | 1.71 m (5 ft 7 in) | 72 kg (159 lb) | (Italy) Rapallo Pallanuoto |
| 12 | Sara Dario | 17 October 1994 (aged 23) | Defender | R | 1.77 m (5 ft 10 in) | 63 kg (139 lb) | (Italy) CS Plebiscito Padova |
| 13 | Federica Lavi | 22 February 1994 (aged 24) | Goalkeeper | R | 1.70 m (5 ft 7 in) | 68 kg (150 lb) | (Italy) Rapallo Pallanuoto |

=== Netherlands ===
Head coach: Arno Havenga

| No | Name | Date of birth | Position | L/R | Height | Weight | Club |
|---|---|---|---|---|---|---|---|
| 1 | Laura Aarts | 10 August 1996 (aged 21) | Goalkeeper | R | 1.75 m (5 ft 9 in) | 80 kg (180 lb) | (Hungary) Dunaújvárosi FVE |
| 2 | Maud Megens | 6 February 1996 (aged 22) | Field player | R | 1.84 m (6 ft 0 in) | 71 kg (157 lb) | (Netherlands) USC |
| 3 | Dagmar Genee (C) | 31 January 1989 (aged 29) | Centre back | R | 1.78 m (5 ft 10 in) | 70 kg (150 lb) | (Netherlands) UZSC Utrecht |
| 4 | Sabrina van der Sloot | 16 March 1991 (aged 27) | Wing | R | 1.75 m (5 ft 9 in) | 63 kg (139 lb) | (Italy) AS Orizzonte Catania |
| 5 | Iris Wolves | 9 May 1994 (aged 24) | Centre forward | R | 1.80 m (5 ft 11 in) | 75 kg (165 lb) | (Netherlands) Polar Bears |
| 6 | Nomi Stomphorst | 23 August 1992 (aged 25) | Wing | R | 1.72 m (5 ft 8 in) | 63 kg (139 lb) | (Netherlands) GZC Donk |
| 7 | Bente Rogge | 2 October 1997 (aged 20) | Defender | R | 1.78 m (5 ft 10 in) | 72 kg (159 lb) | (United States) Arizona State Sun Devils |
| 8 | Vivian Sevenich | 28 February 1993 (aged 25) | Centre forward | L | 1.80 m (5 ft 11 in) | 80 kg (180 lb) | (Hungary) UVSE |
| 9 | Kitty-Lynn Joustra | 11 January 1998 (aged 20) | Centre forward | R | 1.77 m (5 ft 10 in) | 78 kg (172 lb) | (United States) California Golden Bears |
| 10 | Ilse Koolhaas | 11 June 1997 (aged 21) | Defender | R | 1.83 m (6 ft 0 in) | 76 kg (168 lb) | (Italy) AS Orizzonte Catania |
| 11 | Rozanne Voorvelt | 25 April 2001 (aged 17) | Defender | R | 1.77 m (5 ft 10 in) | 75 kg (165 lb) | (Netherlands) ZVL-1886 |
| 12 | Brigitte Sleeking | 19 March 1998 (aged 20) | Field player | R | 1.78 m (5 ft 10 in) | 67 kg (148 lb) | (Spain) CN Sant Andreu |
| 13 | Debby Willemsz | 10 May 1994 (aged 24) | Goalkeeper | R | 1.77 m (5 ft 10 in) | 70 kg (150 lb) | (Spain) CN Mataró |

== Group B ==
=== Germany ===
Head coach: Anja Skibba

| No | Name | Date of birth | Position | L/R | Height | Weight | Club |
|---|---|---|---|---|---|---|---|
| 1 | Felicitas Saurusajtis | 23 January 1995 (aged 23) | Goalkeeper | R | 1.73 m (5 ft 8 in) | 65 kg (143 lb) | (Germany) Blau-Weiß Bochum |
| 2 | Belen Vosseberg | 15 December 1997 (aged 20) | Wing | L | 1.66 m (5 ft 5 in) | 61 kg (134 lb) | (Germany) Spandau 04 |
| 3 | Maren Hinz | 6 November 1997 (aged 20) | Field player | R | 1.84 m (6 ft 0 in) | 80 kg (180 lb) | (Germany) ETV Hamburg |
| 4 | Sophia Eggert | 5 March 1999 (aged 19) | Field player | R | 1.70 m (5 ft 7 in) | 72 kg (159 lb) | (Germany) Bayer Uerdingen |
| 5 | Ira Deike | 30 April 1998 (aged 20) | Wing | R | 1.60 m (5 ft 3 in) | 53 kg (117 lb) | (Germany) SV Nikar Heidelberg |
| 6 | Gesa Deike | 26 June 1995 (aged 23) | Wing | R | 1.70 m (5 ft 7 in) | 63 kg (139 lb) | (Germany) SV Nikar Heidelberg |
| 7 | Nicole Vunder | 18 April 2002 (aged 16) | Field player | R | 1.67 m (5 ft 6 in) | 68 kg (150 lb) | (Germany) SC Chemnitz 1892 |
| 8 | Aylin Fry | 12 January 1999 (aged 19) | Wing | R | 1.63 m (5 ft 4 in) | 62 kg (137 lb) | (Germany) Bayer Uerdingen |
| 9 | Jennifer Stiefel | 13 July 1992 (aged 26) | Wing | R | 1.66 m (5 ft 5 in) | 60 kg (130 lb) | (Germany) SV Nikar Heidelberg |
| 10 | Lilian Adamski | 17 September 1997 (aged 20) | Wing | R | 1.75 m (5 ft 9 in) | 56 kg (123 lb) | (Germany) Blau-Weiß Bochum |
| 11 | Carmen Gelse (C) | 22 September 1987 (aged 30) | Defender | R | 1.77 m (5 ft 10 in) | 72 kg (159 lb) | (Germany) Waspo Hannover |
| 12 | Lynn Krukenberg | 14 June 1998 (aged 20) | Centre back | R | 1.86 m (6 ft 1 in) | 78 kg (172 lb) | (Germany) ETV Hamburg |
| 13 | Ronja Kerssenboom | 17 October 1996 (aged 21) | Goalkeeper | R | 1.70 m (5 ft 7 in) | 65 kg (143 lb) | (Germany) Bayer Uerdingen |

=== Hungary ===
Head coach: Attila Biró

| No | Name | Date of birth | Position | L/R | Height | Weight | Club |
|---|---|---|---|---|---|---|---|
| 1 | Edina Gangl | 25 June 1990 (aged 28) | Goalkeeper | R | 1.81 m (5 ft 11 in) | 66 kg (146 lb) | (Hungary) UVSE |
| 2 | Dorottya Szilágyi | 10 November 1996 (aged 21) | Field player | R | 1.81 m (5 ft 11 in) | 68 kg (150 lb) | (Hungary) Dunaújvárosi FVE |
| 3 | Rebecca Parkes | 16 August 1994 (aged 23) | Centre back | R | 1.82 m (6 ft 0 in) | 79 kg (174 lb) | (Hungary) UVSE |
| 4 | Gréta Gurisatti | 14 May 1996 (aged 22) | Field player | R | 1.76 m (5 ft 9 in) | 73 kg (161 lb) | (Hungary) Dunaújvárosi FVE |
| 5 | Gabriella Szűcs | 7 March 1988 (aged 30) | Field player | R | 1.83 m (6 ft 0 in) | 73 kg (161 lb) | (Hungary) UVSE |
| 6 | Brigitta Horváth | 14 May 1996 (aged 22) | Wing | L | 1.74 m (5 ft 9 in) | 77 kg (170 lb) | (Hungary) Dunaújvárosi FVE |
| 7 | Anna Illés | 21 February 1994 (aged 24) | Field player | R | 1.80 m (5 ft 11 in) | 70 kg (150 lb) | (United States) California Golden Bears |
| 8 | Rita Keszthelyi (C) | 10 December 1991 (aged 26) | Field player | R | 1.78 m (5 ft 10 in) | 68 kg (150 lb) | (Hungary) UVSE |
| 9 | Dóra Leimeter | 8 May 1996 (aged 22) | Centre back | L | 1.75 m (5 ft 9 in) | 77 kg (170 lb) | (Hungary) Budapesti VSC |
| 10 | Aniko Gyöngyösi | 21 May 1990 (aged 28) | Centre forward | R | 1.87 m (6 ft 2 in) | 100 kg (220 lb) | (Hungary) Budapesti VSC |
| 11 | Dóra Csabai | 20 April 1989 (aged 29) | Field player | R | 1.75 m (5 ft 9 in) | 66 kg (146 lb) | (Hungary) UVSE |
| 12 | Krisztina Garda | 16 July 1994 (aged 23) | Defender | R | 1.70 m (5 ft 7 in) | 80 kg (180 lb) | (Hungary) Dunaújvárosi FVE |
| 13 | Eszter Tóth | 1 October 1992 (aged 25) | Goalkeeper | R | 1.75 m (5 ft 9 in) | 66 kg (146 lb) | (Hungary) Budapesti VSC |

=== Russia ===
Head coach: Alexander Gaidukov

| No | Name | Date of birth | Position | L/R | Height | Weight | Club |
|---|---|---|---|---|---|---|---|
| 1 | Anastasia Verkhoglyadova | 12 June 1995 (aged 23) | Goalkeeper | R | 1.77 m (5 ft 10 in) | 62 kg (137 lb) | (Russia) Spartak Volgograd |
| 2 | Veronika Vakhitova | 13 June 1998 (aged 20) | Defender | R | 1.78 m (5 ft 10 in) | 72 kg (159 lb) | (Russia) Dinamo SKIF CSP |
| 3 | Ekaterina Prokofyeva | 13 March 1991 (aged 27) | Field player | R | 1.76 m (5 ft 9 in) | 70 kg (150 lb) | (Russia) Kinef Kirishi |
| 4 | Elvina Karimova | 25 March 1994 (aged 24) | Wing | R | 1.66 m (5 ft 5 in) | 62 kg (137 lb) | (Russia) Uralochka Zlatoust |
| 5 | Maria Borisova | 28 July 1997 (aged 20) | Defender | R | 1.85 m (6 ft 1 in) | 95 kg (209 lb) | (Russia) Dinamo SKIF CSP |
| 6 | Olga Gorbunova | 27 August 1993 (aged 24) | Wing | R | 1.69 m (5 ft 7 in) | 61 kg (134 lb) | (Russia) Spartak Volgograd |
| 7 | Alena Serzhantova | 6 May 1998 (aged 20) | Field player | R | 1.74 m (5 ft 9 in) | 72 kg (159 lb) | (Russia) Dinamo SKIF CSP |
| 8 | Anastasia Simanovich | 23 January 1995 (aged 23) | Centre forward | R | 1.74 m (5 ft 9 in) | 70 kg (150 lb) | (Russia) Kinef Kirishi |
| 9 | Anna Timofeeva (C) | 18 July 1987 (aged 30) | Centre forward | R | 1.78 m (5 ft 10 in) | 87 kg (192 lb) | (Russia) WC Yugra |
| 10 | Nataliya Churzina | 28 May 1991 (aged 27) | Defender | R | 1.74 m (5 ft 9 in) | 73 kg (161 lb) | (Russia) Spartak Volgograd |
| 11 | Evgeniya Ivanova | 26 July 1987 (aged 30) | Wing | R | 1.76 m (5 ft 9 in) | 70 kg (150 lb) | (Russia) Kinef Kirishi |
| 12 | Daria Ryzhkova | 8 February 1995 (aged 23) | Field player | R | 1.68 m (5 ft 6 in) | 62 kg (137 lb) | (Russia) Kinef Kirishi |
| 13 | Anna Karnaukh | 31 August 1993 (aged 24) | Goalkeeper | R | 1.71 m (5 ft 7 in) | 61 kg (134 lb) | (Russia) Kinef Kirishi |

=== Serbia ===
Head coach: Dejan Jovović

| No | Name | Date of birth | Position | L/R | Height | Weight | Club |
|---|---|---|---|---|---|---|---|
| 1 | Vladan Klincov | 23 March 1990 (aged 28) | Goalkeeper | R | 1.88 m (6 ft 2 in) | 77 kg (170 lb) | (Serbia) VK Vojvodina |
| 2 | Katarina Čegar | 1 June 1995 (aged 23) | Field player | R | 1.74 m (5 ft 9 in) | 68 kg (150 lb) | (Serbia) VK Crvena zvezda |
| 3 | Jovana Pantović | 5 February 1993 (aged 25) | Defender | R | 1.74 m (5 ft 9 in) | 66 kg (146 lb) | (Serbia) VK Crvena zvezda |
| 4 | Ivana Ćorović (C) | 20 September 1983 (aged 34) | Defender | R | 1.78 m (5 ft 10 in) | 64 kg (141 lb) | (Serbia) VK Crvena zvezda |
| 5 | Nina Josifović | 17 January 2000 (aged 18) | Field player | R | 1.68 m (5 ft 6 in) | 66 kg (146 lb) | (Serbia) VK Crvena zvezda |
| 6 | Ana Prica | 26 January 1990 (aged 28) | Defender | R | 1.73 m (5 ft 8 in) | 66 kg (146 lb) | (Serbia) VK Vojvodina |
| 7 | Lara Luka | 25 November 2000 (aged 17) | Centre back | R | 1.83 m (6 ft 0 in) | 70 kg (150 lb) | (Hungary) Dunaújvárosi FVE |
| 8 | Nada Mandić | 19 September 1997 (aged 20) | Centre forward | R | 1.84 m (6 ft 0 in) | 78 kg (172 lb) | (Serbia) VK Vojvodina |
| 9 | Teodora Rudić | 2 April 1998 (aged 20) | Field player | R | 1.73 m (5 ft 8 in) | 66 kg (146 lb) | (Serbia) VK Crvena zvezda |
| 10 | Jelena Vuković | 8 February 1994 (aged 24) | Field player | R | 1.88 m (6 ft 2 in) | 76 kg (168 lb) | (Serbia) VK Vojvodina |
| 11 | Nađa Novaković | 3 July 2000 (aged 18) | Field player | R | 1.70 m (5 ft 7 in) | 67 kg (148 lb) | (Serbia) VK Crvena zvezda |
| 12 | Tijana Jakovljević | 28 July 1991 (aged 26) | Centre forward | R | 1.86 m (6 ft 1 in) | 78 kg (172 lb) | (Serbia) VK Palilula |
| 13 | Anđela Petrović | 21 March 2000 (aged 18) | Goalkeeper | R | 1.88 m (6 ft 2 in) | 76 kg (168 lb) | (Serbia) VK Palilula |

=== Spain ===
Head coach: Miki Oca

| No | Name | Date of birth | Position | L/R | Height | Weight | Club |
|---|---|---|---|---|---|---|---|
| 1 | Laura Ester | 22 January 1990 (aged 28) | Goalkeeper | R | 1.75 m (5 ft 9 in) | 58 kg (128 lb) | (Spain) CN Sabadell |
| 2 | Marta Bach | 17 February 1993 (aged 25) | Defender | R | 1.77 m (5 ft 10 in) | 69 kg (152 lb) | (Spain) CN Mataró |
| 3 | Anni Espar | 8 January 1993 (aged 25) | Wing | R | 1.80 m (5 ft 11 in) | 67 kg (148 lb) | (Spain) CN Sabadell |
| 4 | Beatriz Ortiz | 21 June 1995 (aged 23) | Wing | R | 1.79 m (5 ft 10 in) | 64 kg (141 lb) | (Spain) CN Sabadell |
| 5 | Matilde Ortiz | 16 September 1990 (aged 27) | Defender | R | 1.74 m (5 ft 9 in) | 67 kg (148 lb) | (Spain) CN Sabadell |
| 6 | Helena Lloret | 5 June 1992 (aged 26) | Wing | L | 1.68 m (5 ft 6 in) | 62 kg (137 lb) | (Spain) CN Mataró |
| 7 | Clara Espar | 29 September 1994 (aged 23) | All-round | R | 1.78 m (5 ft 10 in) | 68 kg (150 lb) | (Spain) CE Mediterrani |
| 8 | María del Pilar Peña (C) | 4 April 1986 (aged 32) | Field player | L | 1.74 m (5 ft 9 in) | 62 kg (137 lb) | (Spain) CN Sabadell |
| 9 | Judith Forca | 7 June 1996 (aged 22) | Wing | L | 1.73 m (5 ft 8 in) | 69 kg (152 lb) | (Spain) CN Sabadell |
| 10 | Anna Gual | 30 May 1996 (aged 22) | Field player | R | 1.72 m (5 ft 8 in) | 71 kg (157 lb) | (Italy) SIS Roma |
| 11 | Maica García Godoy | 17 October 1990 (aged 27) | Centre forward | R | 1.88 m (6 ft 2 in) | 90 kg (200 lb) | (Spain) CN Sabadell |
| 12 | Paula Leiton | 27 April 2000 (aged 18) | Centre forward | R | 1.86 m (6 ft 1 in) | 100 kg (220 lb) | (Spain) CN Sabadell |
| 13 | María Sánchez | 22 October 1994 (aged 23) | Goalkeeper | R | 1.78 m (5 ft 10 in) | 64 kg (141 lb) | (Spain) CN Sant Andreu |

=== Turkey ===
Head coach: Hakan Şahbaz

| No | Name | Date of birth | Position | L/R | Height | Weight | Club |
|---|---|---|---|---|---|---|---|
| 1 | Elif Dilara Aydınlık | 19 July 1999 (aged 18) | Goalkeeper | R | 1.86 m (6 ft 1 in) | 80 kg (180 lb) | (Turkey) Galatasaray |
| 2 | Zeynep Visha | 3 March 2000 (aged 18) | Wing | R | 1.69 m (5 ft 7 in) | 55 kg (121 lb) | (Turkey) ESTI Izmir |
| 3 | Dilara Buralı | 27 March 2000 (aged 18) | Centre forward | R | 1.86 m (6 ft 1 in) | 80 kg (180 lb) | (Turkey) Galatasaray |
| 4 | Ecehan Gökçe Temel | 12 April 2000 (aged 18) | Defender | R | 1.77 m (5 ft 10 in) | 55 kg (121 lb) | (Turkey) Galatasaray |
| 5 | Karya Köse | 20 January 1997 (aged 21) | Defender | R | 1.73 m (5 ft 8 in) | 67 kg (148 lb) | (Turkey) ESTI Izmir |
| 6 | Selina Colak | 1 March 2001 (aged 17) | Centre forward | R | 1.64 m (5 ft 5 in) | 59 kg (130 lb) | (Turkey) ESTI Izmir |
| 7 | Zeynep Özgümüş | 17 July 2000 (aged 17) | Wing | L | 1.70 m (5 ft 7 in) | 62 kg (137 lb) | (Turkey) Galatasaray |
| 8 | Yağmur Elma | 19 January 1996 (aged 22) | Field player | R | 1.64 m (5 ft 5 in) | 63 kg (139 lb) | (Turkey) ESTI Izmir |
| 9 | Ipek Altan | 11 May 1991 (aged 27) | Defender | R | 1.75 m (5 ft 9 in) | 68 kg (150 lb) | (Netherlands) Zwemvereniging Het Y |
| 10 | Kübra Kuş (C) | 9 October 1994 (aged 23) | Centre forward | R | 1.70 m (5 ft 7 in) | 80 kg (180 lb) | (Turkey) ESTI Izmir |
| 11 | Doğa Cengiz | 14 September 2001 (aged 16) | Defender | R | 1.75 m (5 ft 9 in) | 75 kg (165 lb) | (Turkey) Galatasaray |
| 12 | Ayça Duran | 25 August 2003 (aged 14) | Defender | R | 1.77 m (5 ft 10 in) | 55 kg (121 lb) | (Turkey) Odtu Sport Club |
| 13 | Yaren Baki | 26 November 1999 (aged 18) | Goalkeeper | R | 1.80 m (5 ft 11 in) | 76 kg (168 lb) | (Turkey) Hannover |
