= 2007–08 LEN Women's Champions' Cup =

Water polo tournament

The 2007–08 LEN Women's Champions' Cup was the 21st edition of LEN's premier competition for women's water polo clubs, running from 29 November 2007 to 26 April 2008. Orizzonte Catania defeated NC Vouiagmeni to win its eighth title. Defending champion Fiorentina Waterpolo and ZVL Leiden also reached the newly introduced final four, which replaced the previous editions' round-robin final stage.

== First qualifying round ==
=== Group A ===
| | Team | PL | W | D | L | F | A | Pts |
|---|---|---|---|---|---|---|---|---|
| 1 | (Greece) Glyfada | 4 | 4 | 0 | 0 | 80 | 16 | 12 |
| 2 | (Netherlands) Polar Bears Ede | 4 | 3 | 0 | 1 | 52 | 24 | 9 |
| 3 | (Portugal) Portuense (host) | 4 | 2 | 0 | 2 | 35 | 42 | 6 |
| 4 | (United Kingdom) City of Sheffield | 4 | 1 | 0 | 3 | 33 | 47 | 3 |
| 5 | (Austria) Tirol Innsbruck | 4 | 0 | 0 | 4 | 12 | 83 | 0 |

=== Group B ===
| | Team | PL | W | D | L | F | A | Pts |
|---|---|---|---|---|---|---|---|---|
| 1 | (Hungary) Budapest Honvéd | 4 | 4 | 0 | 0 | 71 | 17 | 12 |
| 2 | (Spain) Mediterrani | 4 | 3 | 0 | 1 | 55 | 31 | 9 |
| 3 | (France) Olympic Nice (host) | 4 | 2 | 0 | 2 | 42 | 32 | 6 |
| 4 | (United Kingdom) Liverpool Lizards | 4 | 1 | 0 | 3 | 30 | 40 | 3 |
| 5 | (Sweden) Linköping | 4 | 0 | 0 | 4 | 16 | 94 | 0 |

=== Group C ===
| | Team | PL | W | D | L | F | A | Pts |
|---|---|---|---|---|---|---|---|---|
| 1 | (Hungary) Dunaújvárosi (host) | 3 | 3 | 0 | 0 | 43 | 19 | 9 |
| 2 | (Netherlands) ZVL Leiden | 3 | 2 | 0 | 1 | 47 | 25 | 6 |
| 3 | (Germany) Blau-Weiss Bochum | 3 | 1 | 0 | 2 | 43 | 34 | 3 |
| 4 | (Slovakia) Vrutky | 3 | 0 | 0 | 3 | 13 | 68 | 0 |

=== Group D ===
| | Team | PL | W | D | L | F | A | Pts |
|---|---|---|---|---|---|---|---|---|
| 1 | (Italy) Orizzonte Catania (host) | 3 | 3 | 0 | 0 | 57 | 19 | 9 |
| 2 | (Spain) Sabadell | 3 | 2 | 0 | 1 | 52 | 30 | 6 |
| 3 | (France) Nancy | 3 | 0 | 1 | 2 | 22 | 50 | 1 |
| 4 | (Czech Republic) Strakonice | 3 | 0 | 1 | 2 | 24 | 56 | 1 |

== Second qualifying round ==
=== Group A ===
| | Team | PL | W | D | L | F | A | Pts |
|---|---|---|---|---|---|---|---|---|
| 1 | (Russia) Kinef Kirishi | 2 | 2 | 0 | 0 | 31 | 19 | 6 |
| 2 | (Greece) Glyfada (host) | 2 | 1 | 0 | 1 | 19 | 19 | 3 |
| 3 | (Spain) Mediterrani | 2 | 0 | 0 | 2 | 21 | 33 | 0 |

=== Group B ===
| | Team | PL | W | D | L | F | A | Pts |
|---|---|---|---|---|---|---|---|---|
| 1 | (Italy) Orizzonte Catania | 3 | 3 | 0 | 0 | 33 | 14 | 9 |
| 2 | (Italy) Fiorentina | 3 | 2 | 0 | 1 | 42 | 27 | 6 |
| 3 | (Germany) Blau-Weiss Bochum (host) | 3 | 1 | 0 | 2 | 28 | 42 | 3 |
| 4 | (Netherlands) Polar Bears Ede | 3 | 0 | 0 | 3 | 20 | 40 | 0 |

=== Group C ===
| | Team | PL | W | D | L | F | A | Pts |
|---|---|---|---|---|---|---|---|---|
| 1 | (Hungary) Budapest Honvéd (host) | 3 | 3 | 0 | 0 | 43 | 22 | 9 |
| 2 | (Netherlands) ZVL Leiden | 3 | 2 | 0 | 1 | 51 | 30 | 6 |
| 3 | (Russia) Uralochka Zlatoust | 3 | 1 | 0 | 2 | 47 | 35 | 3 |
| 4 | (Portugal) Portuense | 3 | 0 | 0 | 3 | 19 | 73 | 0 |

=== Group D ===
| | Team | PL | W | D | L | F | A | Pts |
|---|---|---|---|---|---|---|---|---|
| 1 | (Hungary) Dunaújvárosi | 3 | 3 | 0 | 0 | 41 | 25 | 9 |
| 2 | (Greece) Vouliagmeni | 3 | 2 | 0 | 1 | 51 | 28 | 6 |
| 3 | (Spain) Sabadell (host) | 3 | 1 | 0 | 2 | 33 | 39 | 3 |
| 4 | (France) Olympic Nice | 3 | 0 | 0 | 3 | 23 | 56 | 0 |

== Quarter-finals ==
| Team #1 | Agg. | Team #2 | 1st | 2nd |
|---|---|---|---|---|
| Dunaújvárosi (Hungary) | 17–24 | (Netherlands) ZVL Leiden | 11–9 | 6–15 |
| Glyfada (Greece) | 16–21 | (Italy) Orizzonte Catania | 10–8 | 6–13 |
| Vouliagmeni (Greece) | 19–16 | (Hungary) Budapest Honvéd | 9–9 | 10–7 |
| Kinef Kirishi (Russia) | 14–15 | (Italy) Fiorentina | 8–7 | 6–8 |

== Final four ==
- Catania

Semi-finals
22 April
(Netherlands) ZVL Leiden | 5
(Italy) Orizzonte Catania | 11
22 April
(Greece) Vouliagmeni | 13
(Italy) Fiorentina | 12

Final
23 April
(Italy) Orizzonte Catania | 14
(Greece) Vouliagmeni | 13
Third place
23 April
(Netherlands) ZVL Leiden | 12
(Italy) Fiorentina | 15
