= 2009–10 LEN Women's Champions' Cup =

Water polo tournament

The 2009-10 LEN Women's Champions' Cup was the 23rd edition of LEN's premier competition for women's water polo clubs. It was contested by sixteen teams from ten countries, running from 18 December 2009 to 10 April 2010. Defending champion NC Vouliagmeni, which hosted the Final Four, defeated Kinef Kirishi in the final to win its second title. Orizzonte Catania was third and Olympiacos CFP fourth.

== Group stage ==
#	Team	Pld	W	D	L	GF	GA	Pt
1	(Italy) Fiorentina	3	3	0	0	59	15	9
2	(Spain) Alcorcón	3	2	0	1	51	30	6
3	(Hungary) Dunaújvárosi	3	1	0	2	51	33	3
4	(Switzerland) Horgen	3	0	0	3	10	93	0

	FIO	ALC	DUN	HOR
Fiorentina		15–7	17–6	27–2
Alcorcón			12–11	32–4
Dunaújvárosi				34–4
Horgen				

#	Team	Pld	W	D	L	GF	GA	Pt
1	(Greece) Olympiacos	3	3	0	0	43	18	9
2	(Russia) Shturm Chekhov	3	2	0	1	41	27	6
3	(Netherlands) Polar Bears	3	1	0	2	33	31	3
4	(England) Liverpool Lizards	3	0	0	3	16	57	0

	OLY	SHT	POL	LIZ
Olympiacos		10–7	18–6	15–5
Shturm			10–9	24–8
Polar Bears				18–3
Lizards				

#	Team	Pld	W	D	L	GF	GA	Pt
1	(Italy) Orizzonte Catania	3	3	0	0	39	19	9
2	(Greece) Vouliagmeni	3	2	0	1	45	20	6
3	(Germany) Blau-Weiss Bochum	3	1	0	2	29	35	3
4	(England) City of Manchester	3	0	0	3	15	54	0

	ORI	VOU	BWB	MAN
Orizzonte		8–6	12–11	19–2
Vouliagmeni			14–8	25–4
Blau-Weiss				10–9
Manchester				

#	Team	Pld	W	D	L	GF	GA	Pt
1	(Russia) Kinef Kirishi	3	3	0	0	51	23	9
2	(Spain) Sabadell	3	2	0	1	38	29	6
3	(Netherlands) Het Ravijn	3	1	0	2	35	34	3
4	(France) Nancy	3	0	0	3	15	54	0

	KIN	SAB	HET	NAN
Kinef		13–8	13–9	25–6
Sabadell			12–9	18–7
Het Ravijn				17–9
Nancy				

== Quarter-finals ==
Team #1	Agg.	Team #2	L #1	L #2
Sabadell (Spain)	26–28	(Greece) Olympiacos	13–14	13–14
Kinef Kirishi (Russia)	21–20	(Russia) Shturm Chekhov	8–8	13–12
Fiorentina (Italy)	13–15	(Greece) Vouliagmeni	10–9	3–6
Alcorcón (Spain)	14–27	(Italy) Orizzonte Catania	10–11	4–16

== Final four ==
- Kerkira, Greece

Semi-finals
9 April
(Greece) Olympiacos	11
(Russia) Kinef Kirishi	12
9 April
(Greece) NC Vouliagmeni	12
(Italy) Orizzonte Catania	9

Final
10 April
(Russia) Kinef Kirishi	7
(Greece) Vouliagmeni	10
Third place
10 April
(Greece) Olympiacos	12
(Italy) Orizzonte Catania	13

2010 LEN Women's Champions' Cup champions

Vouliagmeni
Second title
