= 2020 Women's European Water Polo Championship squads =

This article shows all participating team squads at the 2020 Women's European Water Polo Championship.

Age, caps and clubs are as of 12 January 2020.

== Group A ==
=== Croatia ===
Head coach: Marijo Ćaleta

No	Name	Pos.	Date of birth	Height	Weight	L/R	Caps	Club
1	Alexandra Ratković	GK	22 August 2000 (aged 19)	1.71 m (5 ft 7 in)	69 kg (152 lb)	R	32	(Croatia) VK Primorje
2	Emmi Miljković	W	2 September 1988 (aged 31)	1.73 m (5 ft 8 in)	74 kg (163 lb)	R	36	(Croatia) ŽAVK Mladost
3	Ana Miroslavić	DF	16 June 1995 (aged 24)	1.78 m (5 ft 10 in)	71 kg (157 lb)	R	6	(Canada) Toronto Golden Jets
4	Ema Carević	FP	10 June 1995 (aged 24)	1.73 m (5 ft 8 in)	75 kg (165 lb)	R		(Croatia) POŠK
5	Dina Lordan	W	20 September 1994 (aged 25)	1.70 m (5 ft 7 in)	66 kg (146 lb)	R	36	(Croatia) ŽAVK Mladost
6	Matea Skelin	DF	24 February 1997 (aged 22)	1.78 m (5 ft 10 in)	74 kg (163 lb)	R	30	(Croatia) ŽAVK Mladost
7	Mia Topić	DF	13 May 2001 (aged 18)	1.75 m (5 ft 9 in)	85 kg (187 lb)	R	32	(Croatia) ŽAVK Mladost
8	Domina Butić	W	10 August 2000 (aged 19)	1.63 m (5 ft 4 in)	69 kg (152 lb)	R	32	(Croatia) VK Jadran Split
9	Petra Bukić	W	29 September 1999 (aged 20)	1.77 m (5 ft 10 in)	67 kg (148 lb)	R	32	(Croatia) ŽAVK Mladost
10	Ivana Butić	W	7 March 1996 (aged 23)	1.60 m (5 ft 3 in)	63 kg (139 lb)	R	32	(Croatia) VK Jadran Split
11	Bruna Barišić	W	26 March 1998 (aged 21)	1.78 m (5 ft 10 in)	65 kg (143 lb)	L	20	(Croatia) VK Jadran Split
12	Julija Božan	DF	1 April 1999 (aged 20)	1.72 m (5 ft 8 in)	65 kg (143 lb)	R	20	(Croatia) VK Bura Split
13	Natasha Trojan	GK	4 March 2001 (aged 18)	1.71 m (5 ft 7 in)	71 kg (157 lb)	R	2	(Spain) CE Mediterrani

=== Greece ===
Head coach: Georgios Morfesis

No	Name	Pos.	Date of birth	Height	Weight	L/R	Caps	Club
1	Chrysi Diamantopoulou	GK	22 September 1995 (aged 24)	1.83 m (6 ft 0 in)	70 kg (154 lb)	L		(Greece) Olympiacos
2	Christina Tsoukala (C)	FP	8 July 1991 (aged 28)	1.84 m (6 ft 0 in)	75 kg (165 lb)	R		(Greece) Olympiacos
3	Vasiliki Diamantopoulou	DF	12 March 1993 (aged 26)	1.80 m (5 ft 11 in)	72 kg (159 lb)	R		(Greece) NC Vouliagmeni
4	Nikoleta Eleftheriadou	W	17 January 1998 (aged 21)	1.72 m (5 ft 8 in)	66 kg (146 lb)	R		(Greece) Olympiacos
5	Margarita Plevritou	DF	17 November 1994 (aged 25)	1.77 m (5 ft 10 in)	73 kg (161 lb)	R		(Greece) Olympiacos
6	Alkisti Avramidou	FP	26 February 1988 (aged 31)	1.70 m (5 ft 7 in)	60 kg (132 lb)	R		(Greece) Olympiacos
7	Maria Myriokefalitaki	FP	8 January 2001 (aged 19)	1.80 m (5 ft 11 in)	93 kg (205 lb)	R		(Greece) Olympiacos
8	Alkistis Benekou	FP	31 January 1994 (aged 25)	1.71 m (5 ft 7 in)	71 kg (157 lb)	R		(Greece) Olympiacos
9	Christina Kotsia	DF	10 July 1994 (aged 25)	1.79 m (5 ft 10 in)	70 kg (154 lb)	R		(Greece) NC Vouliagmeni
10	Eirini Ninou	W	20 September 2002 (aged 17)	1.70 m (5 ft 7 in)	63 kg (139 lb)	R		(Greece) NC Vouliagmeni
11	Eleftheria Plevritou	W	23 April 1997 (aged 22)	1.78 m (5 ft 10 in)	67 kg (148 lb)	R		(Greece) Olympiacos
12	Eleni Xenaki	CF	5 July 1997 (aged 22)	1.76 m (5 ft 9 in)	79 kg (174 lb)	L		(Greece) NC Vouliagmeni
13	Ioanna Stamatopoulou	GK	17 June 1998 (aged 21)	1.84 m (6 ft 0 in)	72 kg (159 lb)	R		(Greece) Olympiacos

=== Hungary ===
Head coach: Attila Bíró

No	Name	Pos.	Date of birth	Height	Weight	L/R	Caps	Club
1	Edina Gangl	GK	25 June 1990 (aged 29)	1.81 m (5 ft 11 in)	64 kg (141 lb)	R	123	(Hungary) UVSE
2	Dorottya Szilágyi	W	10 November 1996 (aged 23)	1.82 m (6 ft 0 in)	68 kg (150 lb)	R	74	(Hungary) Egri VK
3	Zsuzsanna Máté	DF	1 September 1996 (aged 23)	1.78 m (5 ft 10 in)	80 kg (176 lb)	R	32	(Hungary) Ferencvárosi TC
4	Gréta Gurisatti	FP	14 May 1996 (aged 23)	1.76 m (5 ft 9 in)	75 kg (165 lb)	R	82	(Hungary) Dunaújvárosi FVE
5	Vanda Vályi	FP	13 August 1999 (aged 20)	1.81 m (5 ft 11 in)	64 kg (141 lb)	R	38	(Hungary) Dunaújvárosi FVE
6	Rebecca Parkes	CF	16 August 1994 (aged 25)	1.82 m (6 ft 0 in)	83 kg (183 lb)	R	19	(Hungary) UVSE
7	Anna Illés	FP	21 February 1994 (aged 25)	1.80 m (5 ft 11 in)	70 kg (154 lb)	R	163	(Hungary) Ferencvárosi TC
8	Rita Keszthelyi (C)	AR	10 December 1991 (aged 28)	1.78 m (5 ft 10 in)	67 kg (148 lb)	R	261	(Hungary) UVSE
9	Dóra Leimeter	FP	8 May 1996 (aged 23)	1.75 m (5 ft 9 in)	78 kg (172 lb)	L	20	(Hungary) Budapesti VSC
10	Anikó Gyöngyössy	CF	21 May 1990 (aged 29)	1.85 m (6 ft 1 in)	98 kg (216 lb)	R	78	(Hungary) Budapesti VSC
11	Natasa Rybanska	CB	10 April 2000 (aged 19)	1.90 m (6 ft 3 in)	86 kg (190 lb)	R	24	(Hungary) UVSE
12	Krisztina Garda	AR	16 July 1994 (aged 25)	1.70 m (5 ft 7 in)	84 kg (185 lb)	R	109	(Hungary) Dunaújvárosi FVE
13	Orsolya Csehó-Kovácsné	GK	22 November 1988 (aged 31)	1.87 m (6 ft 2 in)	70 kg (154 lb)	R	117	(Hungary) Ferencvárosi TC

=== Russia ===
Head coach: Alexandr Gaidukov

No	Name	Pos.	Date of birth	Height	Weight	L/R	Caps	Club
1	Anna Ustiukhina	GK	18 March 1989 (aged 30)	1.76 m (5 ft 9 in)	67 kg (148 lb)	R		(Russia) Spartak Volgograd
2	Maria Bersneva	W	17 December 1998 (aged 21)	1.68 m (5 ft 6 in)	61 kg (134 lb)	R		(Russia) Uralochka Zlatoust
3	Ekaterina Prokofyeva (C)	W	13 March 1991 (aged 28)	1.76 m (5 ft 9 in)	70 kg (154 lb)	R		(Russia) Kinef Kirishi
4	Elvina Karimova	W	25 March 1994 (aged 25)	1.66 m (5 ft 5 in)	62 kg (137 lb)	R		(Russia) Uralochka Zlatoust
5	Maria Borisova	DF	28 July 1997 (aged 22)	1.86 m (6 ft 1 in)	95 kg (209 lb)	R		(Russia) SKIF-CSP Izmailovo
6	Olga Gorbunova	W	27 August 1993 (aged 26)	1.68 m (5 ft 6 in)	60 kg (132 lb)	R	6	(Russia) Spartak Volgograd
7	Alena Serzhantova	W	6 May 1998 (aged 21)	1.73 m (5 ft 8 in)	72 kg (159 lb)	R		(Russia) SKIF-CSP Izmailovo
8	Anastasia Simanovich	CF	23 January 1995 (aged 24)	1.64 m (5 ft 5 in)	70 kg (154 lb)	R	8	(Russia) Kinef Kirishi
9	Anna Timofeeva	CB	18 July 1987 (aged 32)	1.78 m (5 ft 10 in)	87 kg (192 lb)	R		(Russia) WC Yugra
10	Evgenia Soboleva	FP	26 August 1988 (aged 31)	1.80 m (5 ft 11 in)	75 kg (165 lb)			(Russia) Kinef Kirishi
11	Evgeniya Ivanova	W	26 July 1987 (aged 32)	1.76 m (5 ft 9 in)	70 kg (154 lb)	R		(Russia) Kinef Kirishi
12	Anastasia Fedotova	W	30 November 1998 (aged 21)	1.68 m (5 ft 6 in)	61 kg (134 lb)	R		(Russia) Spartak Volgograd
13	Anna Karnaukh	GK	31 August 1993 (aged 26)	1.73 m (5 ft 8 in)	61 kg (134 lb)			(Russia) Kinef Kirishi

=== Serbia ===
Head coach: Dragana Ivković

No	Name	Pos.	Date of birth	Height	Weight	L/R	Caps	Club
1	Vanja Lazić	GK	24 June 1994 (aged 25)	1.71 m (5 ft 7 in)	64 kg (141 lb)	R	20	(Serbia) VK Crvena zvezda
2	Katarina Čegar	AR	1 June 1995 (aged 24)	1.72 m (5 ft 8 in)	69 kg (152 lb)	R	50	(Serbia) VK Crvena zvezda
3	Jovana Pantović	AR	5 February 1993 (aged 26)	1.72 m (5 ft 8 in)	66 kg (146 lb)	R	51	(Serbia) VK Crvena zvezda
4	Teodora Rudić	AR	2 April 1998 (aged 21)	1.75 m (5 ft 9 in)	63 kg (139 lb)	R	46	(Serbia) VK Palilula
5	Nina Josifović	AR	17 January 2000 (aged 19)	1.68 m (5 ft 6 in)	56 kg (123 lb)	R		(Spain) CN Atlètic-Barceloneta
6	Anja Mišković	W	23 January 2002 (aged 17)	1.70 m (5 ft 7 in)	70 kg (154 lb)	R	30	(Serbia) VK Crvena zvezda
7	Mila Gluščević	AR	19 July 1996 (aged 23)	1.75 m (5 ft 9 in)	70 kg (154 lb)	R		(Serbia) VK Palilula
8	Nada Mandić	CF	19 September 1997 (aged 22)	1.85 m (6 ft 1 in)	80 kg (176 lb)	R	40	(Italy) NC Milano
9	Hristina Ilić	W	30 January 2002 (aged 17)	1.68 m (5 ft 6 in)	62 kg (137 lb)	R	30	(Serbia) VK Crvena zvezda
10	Jelena Vuković	FP	8 February 1994 (aged 25)	1.77 m (5 ft 10 in)	79 kg (174 lb)	R	20	(Italy) NC Milano
11	Ana Milićević	W	13 September 2003 (aged 16)	1.68 m (5 ft 6 in)	60 kg (132 lb)	R	2	(Serbia) VK Palilula
12	Tijana Jakovljević (C)	AR	28 July 1991 (aged 28)	1.77 m (5 ft 10 in)	75 kg (165 lb)	R	42	(Serbia) VK Crvena zvezda
13	Nikolina Travar	GK	2 January 2001 (aged 19)	1.76 m (5 ft 9 in)	70 kg (154 lb)	R	40	(Serbia) VK Vojvodina

=== Slovakia ===
Head coach: Milán Heinrich

No	Name	Pos.	Date of birth	Height	Weight	L/R	Caps	Club
1	Emőke Kissová	GK	8 April 2002 (aged 17)	1.73 m (5 ft 8 in)	67 kg (148 lb)	R		(Hungary) Orvosegyetem SC
2	Beáta Kováčiková	AR	4 October 1999 (aged 20)	1.70 m (5 ft 7 in)	65 kg (143 lb)	R		(Slovakia) UK Slovan Bratislava
3	Janka Kurucová	CB	28 November 1998 (aged 21)	1.74 m (5 ft 9 in)	69 kg (152 lb)	R		(Slovakia) ŠG Olympia Košice
4	Lenka Garančovská	W	3 February 2003 (aged 16)	1.70 m (5 ft 7 in)	56 kg (123 lb)	R		(Slovakia) ŠG Olympia Košice
5	Emma Junasová	AR	17 February 2002 (aged 17)	1.83 m (6 ft 0 in)	85 kg (187 lb)	R		(Slovakia) ŠG Olympia Košice
6	Monika Sedláková	AR	6 December 2002 (aged 17)	1.69 m (5 ft 7 in)	69 kg (152 lb)	R		(Hungary) Tatabányai Vízmű SE
7	Natália Pecková	AR	27 August 1997 (aged 22)	1.68 m (5 ft 6 in)	59 kg (130 lb)	R		(Slovakia) UK Slovan Bratislava
8	Tamara Kolářová	W	4 December 2002 (aged 17)	1.68 m (5 ft 6 in)	67 kg (148 lb)	R		(Hungary) Egri VK
9	Miroslava Stankovianska	CF	10 October 2000 (aged 19)	1.67 m (5 ft 6 in)	80 kg (176 lb)	L		(Italy) Vela Nuoto Ancona
10	Ivana Majláthová	W	5 March 1998 (aged 21)	1.73 m (5 ft 8 in)	65 kg (143 lb)	R		(Slovakia) UK Slovan Bratislava
11	Daniela Kátlovská	W	16 November 1995 (aged 24)	1.72 m (5 ft 8 in)	75 kg (165 lb)	R		(Romania) CS Rapid București
12	Katarína Kissová	CF	17 April 2002 (aged 17)	1.75 m (5 ft 9 in)	75 kg (165 lb)	R		(Slovakia) UK Slovan Bratislava
13	Kristina Horváthová (C)	GK	9 May 1999 (aged 20)	1.83 m (6 ft 0 in)	80 kg (176 lb)	R		(Slovakia) ŠG Olympia Košice

== Group B ==
=== France ===
Head coach: Florian Bruzzo

No	Name	Pos.	Date of birth	Height	Weight	L/R	Caps	Club
1	Csenge Gaál	GK	4 November 1997 (aged 22)	1.86 m (6 ft 1 in)	65 kg (143 lb)	R		(France) Nautic Club Angérien
2	Estelle Millot	AR	21 December 1993 (aged 26)	1.64 m (5 ft 5 in)	53 kg (117 lb)	R		(France) Olympic Nice
3	Lea Bachelier	DF	13 February 1993 (aged 26)	1.78 m (5 ft 10 in)	60 kg (132 lb)	R		(France) Olympic Nice
4	Camelia Bouloukbachi	DF	9 September 2003 (aged 16)	1.78 m (5 ft 10 in)	69 kg (152 lb)	R		(France) SNC Choisy-Le-Roi
5	Louise Guillet	AR	31 January 1986 (aged 33)	1.73 m (5 ft 8 in)	58 kg (128 lb)	R		(France) USB Bordeaux
6	Géraldine Mahieu (C)	W	15 September 1993 (aged 26)	1.88 m (6 ft 2 in)	85 kg (187 lb)	R		(Hungary) Dunaújvárosi FVE
7	Juliette Dhalluin	AR	14 November 2004 (aged 15)	1.67 m (5 ft 6 in)	56 kg (123 lb)	L		(France) Mulhouse Water Polo
8	Camille Radosavljevic	W	12 December 2002 (aged 17)	1.75 m (5 ft 9 in)	70 kg (154 lb)	R		(France) Mulhouse Water Polo
9	Yaëlle Deschampt	DF	28 April 1997 (aged 22)	1.71 m (5 ft 7 in)	65 kg (143 lb)	R		(France) Olympic Nice
10	Ema Vernoux	W	25 March 2004 (aged 15)	1.68 m (5 ft 6 in)	62 kg (137 lb)	R		(France) CN Marseille
11	Clémence Clerc	DF	18 February 1991 (aged 28)	1.85 m (6 ft 1 in)	72 kg (159 lb)	R		(France) Lille Université Club
12	Audrey Daule	AR	6 May 1993 (aged 26)	1.64 m (5 ft 5 in)	62 kg (137 lb)	R		(France) USB Bordeaux
13	Lorene Derenty	GK	4 September 1994 (aged 25)	1.69 m (5 ft 7 in)	62 kg (137 lb)	R		(Spain) CN Mataró

=== Germany ===
Head coach: Arno Troost

No	Name	Pos.	Date of birth	Height	Weight	L/R	Caps	Club
1	Felicitas Saurusajtis	GK	23 January 1995 (aged 24)	1.73 m (5 ft 8 in)	63 kg (139 lb)	R	27	(Germany) Blau-Weiß Bochum
2	Belen Vosseberg	W	15 December 1997 (aged 22)	1.66 m (5 ft 5 in)	60 kg (132 lb)	L	55	(Germany) Wasserfreunde Spandau 04
3	Maren Hinz	DF	6 November 1997 (aged 22)	1.83 m (6 ft 0 in)	80 kg (176 lb)	R	20	(Germany) Eimsbütteler TV
4	Sophia Eggert	CF	5 March 1999 (aged 20)	1.70 m (5 ft 7 in)	72 kg (159 lb)	R	9	(Germany) Bayer Uerdingen
5	Gesa Deike (C)	W	26 June 1995 (aged 24)	1.70 m (5 ft 7 in)	62 kg (137 lb)	R	52	(Germany) Bayer Uerdingen
6	Ira Deike	W	30 April 1998 (aged 21)	1.65 m (5 ft 5 in)	55 kg (121 lb)	R	20	(Germany) Bayer Uerdingen
7	Nicole Vunder	W	18 April 2002 (aged 17)	1.68 m (5 ft 6 in)	70 kg (154 lb)	R	10	(Germany) Wasserfreunde Spandau 04
8	Aylin Fry	W	1 December 1999 (aged 20)	1.63 m (5 ft 4 in)	62 kg (137 lb)	R	40	(Germany) Bayer Uerdingen
9	Jennifer Stiefel	W	13 July 1992 (aged 27)	1.66 m (5 ft 5 in)	60 kg (132 lb)	R	57	(Germany) Wasserfreunde Spandau 04
10	Fabienne Heerdt	W	6 May 1997 (aged 22)	1.74 m (5 ft 9 in)	66 kg (146 lb)	R	2	(Germany) SV Nikar Heidelberg
11	Pauline Pannasch	AR	16 June 1999 (aged 20)	1.73 m (5 ft 8 in)	67 kg (148 lb)	L	2	(Germany) Eimsbütteler TV
12	Lynn Krukenberg	CF	14 June 1998 (aged 21)	1.86 m (6 ft 1 in)	80 kg (176 lb)	R	15	(Germany) Wasserfreunde Spandau 04
13	Ronja Kerßenboom	GK	17 October 1996 (aged 23)	1.70 m (5 ft 7 in)	67 kg (148 lb)	R	20	(Germany) Bayer Uerdingen

=== Israel ===
Head coach: Dimitrios Mavrotas

No	Name	Pos.	Date of birth	Height	Weight	L/R	Caps	Club
1	Ayelet Peres	GK	27 March 1992 (aged 27)	1.70 m (5 ft 7 in)	64 kg (141 lb)	R	43	(Israel) ASA Tel Aviv
2	Noa Sasover	CF	8 March 2003 (aged 16)	1.73 m (5 ft 8 in)	70 kg (154 lb)	R	3	(Israel) Hapoel Petah Tikva
3	Yahav Farkash	DF	16 September 2002 (aged 17)	1.65 m (5 ft 5 in)	63 kg (139 lb)	R	2	(Israel) Hapoel Yoqneam
4	Miriam Bogachenko	W	29 July 2002 (aged 17)	1.77 m (5 ft 10 in)	70 kg (154 lb)	R	25	(Israel) Hapoel Petah Tikva
5	Kerem Noy	CF	9 December 1999 (aged 20)	1.66 m (5 ft 5 in)	74 kg (163 lb)	R	25	(Israel) Hapoel Petah Tikva
6	Hila Futorian	DF	27 November 2000 (aged 19)	1.77 m (5 ft 10 in)	72 kg (159 lb)	R	24	(Israel) Hapoel Petah Tikva
7	Shunit Strugo (C)	AR	7 January 1987 (aged 33)	1.70 m (5 ft 7 in)	60 kg (132 lb)	R	35	(Israel) Hapoel Yoqneam
8	Lior Ben David	W	15 March 1998 (aged 21)	1.70 m (5 ft 7 in)	60 kg (132 lb)	R	39	(Israel) Hapoel Yoqneam
9	Eden Tal	W	8 December 2000 (aged 19)	1.67 m (5 ft 6 in)	54 kg (119 lb)	R	3	(Israel) Hapoel Yoqneam
10	Mackenzie Mone	AR	4 December 1990 (aged 29)	1.72 m (5 ft 8 in)	77 kg (170 lb)	R	2	(Spain) CN Catalunya
11	Nofar Hochberg	W	4 August 2001 (aged 18)	1.65 m (5 ft 5 in)	61 kg (134 lb)	R	24	(Israel) Hapoel Qiryat Tivon
12	May Regev	FP	6 February 2002 (aged 17)	1.74 m (5 ft 9 in)	70 kg (154 lb)	R	3	(Israel) Hapoel Yoqneam
13	Inbar Geva	GK	19 March 1998 (aged 21)	1.75 m (5 ft 9 in)	60 kg (132 lb)	R	25	(Israel) Hapoel Yoqneam

=== Italy ===
Head coach: Paolo Zizza

No	Name	Pos.	Date of birth	Height	Weight	L/R	Caps	Club
1	Giulia Gorlero	GK	26 September 1990 (aged 29)	1.79 m (5 ft 10 in)	70 kg (154 lb)	R	278	(Italy) Ekipe Orizzonte Catania
2	Chiara Tabani	DF	27 August 1994 (aged 25)	1.76 m (5 ft 9 in)	73 kg (161 lb)	R	152	(Italy) SIS Roma
3	Arianna Garibotti	W	9 December 1989 (aged 30)	1.69 m (5 ft 7 in)	71 kg (157 lb)	R	239	(Italy) Ekipe Orizzonte Catania
4	Silvia Avegno	W	15 June 1997 (aged 22)	1.73 m (5 ft 8 in)	66 kg (146 lb)	R	59	(Italy) SIS Roma
5	Elisa Queirolo (C)	W	6 March 1991 (aged 28)	1.68 m (5 ft 6 in)	63 kg (139 lb)	R	216	(Italy) CS Plebiscito Padova
6	Rosaria Aiello	CF	12 May 1989 (aged 30)	1.74 m (5 ft 9 in)	74 kg (163 lb)	R	275	(Italy) Ekipe Orizzonte Catania
7	Claudia Marletta	CF	23 November 1995 (aged 24)	1.77 m (5 ft 10 in)		R		(Italy) Ekipe Orizzonte Catania
8	Roberta Bianconi	W	8 July 1995 (aged 24)	1.75 m (5 ft 9 in)	76 kg (168 lb)	R	286	(Italy) NC Milano
9	Giulia Emmolo	W	16 October 1991 (aged 28)	1.72 m (5 ft 8 in)	66 kg (146 lb)	L	268	(Greece) Olympiacos
10	Mariagrazia Palmieri	CF	18 October 1993 (aged 26)	1.76 m (5 ft 9 in)	102 kg (225 lb)	R	96	(Italy) Ekipe Orizzonte Catania
11	Izabella Chiappini	W	28 September 1995 (aged 24)	1.71 m (5 ft 7 in)	67 kg (148 lb)	R		(Italy) SIS Roma
12	Carla Carrega	AR	8 July 1995 (aged 24)	1.83 m (6 ft 0 in)		R		(Italy) NC Milano
13	Fabiana Sparano	GK	12 May 1995 (aged 24)	1.73 m (5 ft 8 in)	74 kg (163 lb)	R		(Italy) SIS Roma

=== Netherlands ===
Head coach: Arno Havenga

No	Name	Pos.	Date of birth	Height	Weight	L/R	Caps	Club
1	Joanne Koenders	GK	28 February 1997 (aged 22)	1.78 m (5 ft 10 in)	70 kg (154 lb)	R		(Netherlands) Polar Bears Ede
2	Maud Megens	W	6 February 1996 (aged 23)	1.83 m (6 ft 0 in)	70 kg (154 lb)	R	147	(Netherlands) Widex GZC Donk
3	Dagmar Genee (C)	DF	31 January 1989 (aged 30)	1.78 m (5 ft 10 in)	70 kg (154 lb)	R		(Netherlands) UZSC Utrecht
4	Catharina van der Sloot	W	16 March 1991 (aged 28)	1.75 m (5 ft 9 in)	62 kg (137 lb)	R		(Netherlands) UZSC Utrecht
5	Iris Wolves	CF	9 May 1994 (aged 25)	1.80 m (5 ft 11 in)	79 kg (174 lb)	R	18	(Netherlands) Polar Bears Ede
6	Nomi Stomphorst	AR	23 August 1992 (aged 27)	1.72 m (5 ft 8 in)	63 kg (139 lb)	R	236	(Netherlands) Widex GZC Donk
7	Bente Rogge	DF	2 October 1997 (aged 22)	1.76 m (5 ft 9 in)	70 kg (154 lb)	R		(Netherlands) ZV De Zaan
8	Vivian Sevenich	W	28 February 1993 (aged 26)	1.80 m (5 ft 11 in)	82 kg (181 lb)	L		(Netherlands) UZSC Utrecht
9	Maartje Keuning	W	26 April 1998 (aged 21)	1.83 m (6 ft 0 in)	73 kg (161 lb)	R		(Netherlands) ZV De Zaan
10	Kitty-Lynn Joustra	CF	11 January 1998 (aged 22)	1.77 m (5 ft 10 in)		R		(Netherlands) ZV De Zaan
11	Simone van de Kraats	W	15 November 2000 (aged 19)	1.80 m (5 ft 11 in)	72 kg (159 lb)	L		(Netherlands) Polar Bears Ede
12	Brigitte Sleeking	R	19 March 1998 (aged 21)	1.78 m (5 ft 10 in)	68 kg (150 lb)	R		(Netherlands) Widex GZC Donk
13	Debby Willemsz	GK	10 May 1994 (aged 25)	1.78 m (5 ft 10 in)	75 kg (165 lb)	R		(Netherlands) Widex GZC Donk

=== Spain ===
Head coach: Miki Oca

No	Name	Pos.	Date of birth	Height	Weight	L/R	Caps	Club
1	Laura Ester	GK	22 January 1990 (aged 29)	1.72 m (5 ft 8 in)	53 kg (117 lb)	R		(Spain) CN Sabadell
2	Marta Bach	DF	17 February 1993 (aged 26)	1.76 m (5 ft 9 in)	67 kg (148 lb)	R	150	(Spain) CN Mataró
3	Anni Espar	AR	8 January 1993 (aged 27)	1.80 m (5 ft 11 in)	63 kg (139 lb)	R	150	(Spain) CN Mataró
4	Bea Ortiz	W	21 June 1995 (aged 24)	1.76 m (5 ft 9 in)	64 kg (141 lb)	R		(Spain) CN Terrassa
5	Roser Tarragó	W	25 March 1993 (aged 26)	1.71 m (5 ft 7 in)	62 kg (137 lb)	R		(Spain) CE Mediterrani
6	Irene González	CF	23 July 1996 (aged 23)	1.73 m (5 ft 8 in)		R		(Spain) CN Mataró
7	Clara Espar	DF	29 September 1994 (aged 25)	1.77 m (5 ft 10 in)	64 kg (141 lb)	R	30	(Spain) CE Mediterrani
8	Pili Peña (C)	W	4 April 1986 (aged 33)	1.74 m (5 ft 9 in)	61 kg (134 lb)	L	353	(Spain) CN Terrassa
9	Judith Forca	W	7 June 1996 (aged 23)	1.73 m (5 ft 8 in)	65 kg (143 lb)	L		(Spain) CN Sabadell
10	Paula Crespí	DF	7 April 1998 (aged 21)	1.75 m (5 ft 9 in)	70 kg (150 lb)	R		(Spain) CN Sant Andreu
11	Maica García	CF	17 October 1990 (aged 29)	1.88 m (6 ft 2 in)	75 kg (165 lb)	R		(Spain) CN Sabadell
12	Paula Leitón	CF	27 April 2000 (aged 19)	1.88 m (6 ft 2 in)	96 kg (212 lb)	R		(Spain) CN Terrassa
13	Elena Sánchez	GK	22 October 1994 (aged 25)	1.78 m (5 ft 10 in)	64 kg (141 lb)			(Spain) CN Sant Andreu
