= 2006 LEN Women's Champions' Cup =

Water polo tournament

The 2006 LEN Women's Champions' Cup was the 19th edition of the premier international competition for European women's water polo clubs, organized by LEN. Fourteen national champions took part in the competition, which took place from 9 February to 30 April 2006.

Orizzonte Catania won its third title in a row, becoming the first club to achieve this, and an overall seventh by overcoming runner-up Kinef Kirishi, bronze Dunaújvárosi Főiskola and OC Vouliagmeni in the final stage.

== Qualification round ==
=== Group A ===
#	Team	Pld	W	D	L	GF	GA	Pt
1	(Netherlands) Donk Gouda	4	4	0	0	83	22	12
2	(France) Nancy (host)	4	3	0	1	60	41	9
3	(Portugal) Portuense	4	2	0	2	34	60	6
4	(Slovakia) Vrútky	4	1	0	3	34	57	3
5	(Switzerland) Basel	4	0	0	4	27	58	3

9 February 2006
Donk Gouda	20–4	Basel
Nancy	20–10	Portuense
10 February 2006
Portuense	11–7	Basel
Nancy	16–7	Vrútky
11 February 2006
Donk Gouda	24–3	Portuense
Vrútky	10–6	Basel
11 February 2006
Donk Gouda	25–8	Vrútky
Nancy	17–10	Basel
12 February 2006
Portuense	10–9	Vrútky
Donk Gouda	14–7	Nancy

=== Group B ===
#	Team	Pld	W	D	L	GF	GA	Pt
1	(Greece) Vouliagmeni	4	4	0	0	84	23	12
2	(Spain) Sabadell	4	3	0	1	56	39	9
3	(England) City of Sheffield	4	2	0	2	43	49	6
4	(Czech Republic) Slavia Hradec Králové	4	1	0	3	36	68	3
5	(Croatia) Bura Split (host)	4	0	0	4	36	76	0

9 February 2006
Vouliagmeni	17–4	City of Sheffield
Sabadell	19–6	Bura Split
10 February 2006
City of Sheffield	15–9	Slavia Hradec Králové
Vouliagmeni	24–6	Bura Split
11 February 2006
Vouliagmeni	23–5	Slavia Hradec Králové
Sabadell	12–5	City of Sheffield
11 February 2006
Vouliagmeni	20–8	Sabadell
Slavia Hradec Králové	16–13	Bura Split
12 February 2006
Sabadell	17–6	Slavia Hradec Králové
City of Sheffield	17–11	Bura Split

== Semifinals round ==
=== Group A ===
#	Team	Pld	W	D	L	GF	GA	Pt
1	(Russia) Kinef Kirishi	3	3	0	0	59	31	9
2	(Greece) Vouliagmeni	3	1	0	2	39	32	3
3	(Germany) Blau-Weiss Bochum	3	1	0	2	36	45	3
4	(Spain) Sabadell (host)	3	1	0	2	31	57	3

17 March 2006
Sabadell	16–15	Blau-Weiss Bochum
Kinef Kirishi	15–12	Vouliagmeni
18 March 2006
Kinef Kirishi	20–11	Blau-Weiss Bochum
Vouliagmeni	18–7	Sabadell
19 March 2006
Blau-Weiss Bochum	10–9	Vouliagmeni
Kinef Kirishi	24–8	Sabadell

=== Group B ===
#	Team	Pld	W	D	L	GF	GA	Pt
1	(Italy) Orizzonte Catania	3	3	0	0	46	18	9
2	(Hungary) Dunaújváros (host)	3	2	0	1	30	17	6
3	(Netherlands) Donk Gouda	3	1	0	2	26	36	3
4	(France) Nancy	3	0	0	3	21	52	0

17 March 2006
Dunaújváros	16–4	Nancy
Orizzonte Catania	17–6	Donk Gouda
18 March 2006
Orizzonte Catania	20–7	Nancy
Dunaújváros	9–4	Donk Gouda
19 March 2006
Donk Gouda	16–10	Nancy
Orizzonte Catania	9–5	Dunaújváros

== Final round ==
#	Team	Pld	W	D	L	GF	GA	Pt
1	(Italy) Orizzonte Catania (host)	3	3	0	0	35	25	9
2	(Russia) Kinef Kirishi	3	2	0	1	30	29	6
3	(Hungary) Dunaújváros	3	1	0	2	31	37	3
4	(Greece) Vouliagmeni	3	0	0	3	27	32	0

28 April 2006
Kinef Kirishi	11–8	Dunaújváros
Orizzonte Catania	9–6	Vouliagmeni
18 March 2006
Kinef Kirishi	8–7	Vouliagmeni
Orizzonte Catania	12–8	Dunaújváros
19 March 2006
Dunaújváros	15–14	Vouliagmeni
Orizzonte Catania	14–11	Kinef Kirishi
