= 2012–13 LEN Women's Champions' Cup =

Water polo tournament

The 2012–13 LEN Women's Champions' Cup was the 26th edition of LEN's premier competition for women's water polo clubs, from 22 November 2012 to 27 April 2013. It was contested by twelve teams from nine countries, with Israel and the Netherlands replacing England and Serbia. There was no defending champion as Pro Recco renounced the competition for disagreements with the FIN on the number of allowed foreign players in the Italian clubs' squads.

CN Sabadell defeated Kinef Kirishi in the final to win its second title. Vouliagmeni NC and Egri VK also reached the Final Four, which was hosted by the Hungarian team.

== Group stage ==
=== Group A ===
#	Team	Pld	W	D	L	GF	GA	Pt
1	(Greece) Vouliagmeni	5	4	1	0	58	32	13
2	(Hungary) Egri	5	4	0	1	54	44	12
3	(Russia) Kinef Kirishi	5	3	1	1	48	37	10
4	(Netherlands) Het Ravijn	5	2	0	3	37	53	6
5	(France) Olympic Nice	5	0	1	4	45	55	1
6	(Spain) Mataró	5	0	1	4	36	57	1

	VOU	EGR	KIN	RAV	OLY	MAT
Vouliagmeni		13–8	5–5	14–4	14–8	12–7
Egri	8–13		10–8	13–8	9–8	14–7
Kinef	5–5	8–10		11–6	13–11	11–5
Het Ravijn	4–14	8–13	6–11		9–8	10–7
Olympic	8–14	8–9	11–13	8–9		10–10
Mataró	7–12	7–14	5–11	7–10	10–10	

#	Team	Pld	W	D	L	GF	GA	Pt
1	(Spain) Sabadell	5	4	1	0	105	30	13
2	(Italy) Imperia	5	4	1	0	77	43	13
3	(Greece) Olympiacos	5	3	0	2	66	38	9
4	(France) Nancy	5	2	0	3	54	60	6
5	(Germany) Blau-Weiss Bochum	5	1	0	4	35	86	3
6	(Israel) Kiryat Tivon	5	0	0	5	27	107	0

	SAB	IMP	OLY	NAN	BLA	KIR
Sabadell		12–12	10–7	24–5	30–2	29–4
Imperia	12–12		10–9	12–8	22–8	21–6
Olympiacos	7–10			14–5	14–6	22–7
Nancy	5–24	8–12	5–14		16–4	20–6
Blau-Weiss	2–30	8–22	6–14	4–16		15–4
Kiryat Tivon	4–29	6–21	7–22	6–20	4–15	

== Quarter-finals ==
Team #1	Agg.	Team #2	1st	2nd
Kinef Kirishi (Russia)	27 – 24	(Italy) Imperia	12 – 12	15 – 12
Olympiacos (Greece)	18 – 21	(Hungary) Egri	7 – 8	11 – 13
Het Ravijn (Netherlands)	23 – 32	(Spain) Sabadell	8 – 13	15 – 19
Nancy (France)	12 – 40	(Greece) Vouliagmeni	5 – 17	7 – 23

== Final four ==
Semi-finals
26 April
(Russia) Kinef Kirishi	16
(Hungary) Egri	10
26 April
(Spain) Sabadell	9
(Greece) Vouliagmeni	8

Final
27 April
(Russia) Kinef Kirishi	11
(Spain) Sabadell	13
Third place
27 April
(Hungary) Egri	10
(Greece) Vouliagmeni	13
