= 2011–12 LEN Women's Champions' Cup =

Water polo tournament

The 2011-12 LEN Women's Champions' Cup is the ongoing 25th edition of LEN's competition for women's water polo national champion clubs. Thirteen teams from England, France, Germany, Greece, Italy, Russia, Serbia and Spain entered the competition.

Pro Recco defeated Vouliagmeni 8–7 in the final to win the competition for the first time. Kinef Kirishi and Orizzonte Catania also reached the Final Four, with the Russians hosting the stage. Defending champion CN Sabadell was defeated by Vouliagmeni in the quarter-finals.

== Group stage ==
=== Group A ===
#	Team	Pld	W	D	L	GF	GA	Pt
1	(Italy) Orizzonte Catania	6	6	0	0	85	45	18
2	(Greece) Vouliagmeni	6	5	0	1	81	35	15
3	(Russia) Shturm Ruza	6	4	0	2	67	47	12
4	(England) Liverpool Lizards	6	3	0	3	41	54	9
5	(France) Olympic Nice	6	2	0	4	40	59	6
6	(Germany) Blau-Weiss Bochum	6	1	0	5	42	68	3
7	(Serbia) Taš-2000 Belgrade (host)	6	0	0	6	27	75	0

Day 1
Vouliagmeni	15–4	Taš-2000 Belgrade
Orizzonte Catania	18–8	Olympic Nice
Liverpool Lizards	6–5	Blau-Weiss Bochum
Vouliagmeni	16–3	Liverpool Lizards
Day 2
Orizzonte Catania	13–9	Shturm Ruza
Vouliagmeni	17–7	Blau-Weiss Bochum
Liverpool Lizards	7–5	Olympic Nice
Shturm Ruza	15–5	Taš-2000 Belgrade
Day 3
Olympic Nice	13–7	Blau-Weiss Bochum
Shturm Ruza	13–10	Liverpool Lizards
Orizzonte Catania	19–4	Taš-2000 Belgrade
Shturm Ruza	13–3	Blau-Weiss Bochum
Day 4
Vouliagmeni	13–3	Olympic Nice
Orizzonte Catania	11–3	Liverpool Lizards
Vouliagmeni	10–7	Shturm Ruza
Liverpool Lizards	12–4	Taš-2000 Belgrade
Day 5
Orizzonte Catania	13–11	Blau-Weiss Bochum
Shturm Ruza	10–6	Olympic Nice
Orizzonte Catania	11–10	Vouliagmeni
Blau-Weiss Bochum	9–6	Taš-2000 Belgrade

=== Group B ===
#	Team	Pld	W	D	L	GF	GA	Pt
1	(Italy) Pro Recco	5	5	0	0	74	36	15
2	(Russia) Kinef Kirishi	5	4	0	1	91	34	12
3	(Spain) Sabadell	5	3	0	2	52	37	9
4	(England) City of Manchester	5	1	1	3	46	61	4
5	(Germany) Bayer Uerdingen	5	1	1	3	51	87	4
6	(France) Nancy (host)	5	0	0	5	24	83	0

Day 1
Bayer Uerdingen	15–15	City of Manchester
Pro Recco	14–9	Kinef Kirishi
Sabadell	14–4	Nancy
Day 2
Sabadell	10–9	City of Manchester
Kinef Kirishi	27–1	Nancy
Pro Recco	17–9	Bayer Uerdingen
Day 3
Kinef Kirishi	15–7	City of Manchester
Sabadell	18–6	Bayer Uerdingen
Pro Recco	21–5	Nancy
Day 4
Pro Recco	7–6	Sabadell
Kinef Kirishi	29–8	Bayer Uerdingen
City of Manchester	8–6	Nancy
Day 5
Pro Recco	15–7	City of Manchester
Kinef Kirishi	11–4	Sabadell
Bayer Uerdingen	13–8	Nancy

== Quarter-finals ==
Team #1	Agg.	Team #2	L #1	L #2
City of Manchester (England)	21–31	(Italy) Orizzonte Catania	10–16	11–15
Liverpool Lizards (England)	13–30	(Italy) Pro Recco	7–20	6–10
Sabadell (Spain)	22–24	(Greece) Vouliagmeni	14–13	8–11
Shturm Ruza (Russia)	11–32	(Russia) Kinef Kirishi	7–14	4–18

== Final four ==
- Kirishi, Russia

Semi-finals
4 May
(Russia) Kinef Kirishi	8
(Greece) Vouliagmeni	10
4 May
(Italy) Orizzonte Catania	6
(Italy) Pro Recco	14

Final
5 May
(Greece) Vouliagmeni	7
(Italy) Pro Recco	8
Third place
5 May
(Russia) Kinef Kirishi	18
(Italy) Orizzonte Catania	12
