= European Aquatics Women's Champions League =

Premier competition for women's water polo clubs of Europe

- Current season, competition or edition: 2025–26 European Aquatics Women's Champions League
- Sport: Water polo
- Founded: 1987
- President: Gianni Lonzi
- Country: European Aquatics members
- Continent: Europe
- Most recent champions: (Greece) Olympiacos (4th title)
- Most titles: (Italy) Orizzonte Catania (8 titles)
- Level on pyramid: 1st Tier (Europe)
- Website: len.eu

The European Aquatics Women's Champions League, formerly known as LEN European Cup (from 1987 to 1999), LEN Champions Cup (from 1999 to 2013), LEN Euroleague Women (2014 to 2022) and LEN Women's Champions League (from 2023 to 2024) is the premier competition for women's water polo clubs of Europe and takes place every year. It is organized by the Ligue Européenne de Natation (LEN) and was created in 1987 as LEN European Cup. From 2024, after LEN was renamed to European Aquatics, the new name is the European Aquatics Women's Champions League.

== History ==
Created in 1987 as the women's water polo clubs continental competition, contested amongst the national champions of the European countries, it has been played under the following names:

- LEN European Cup (1987–1999)
- LEN Champions Cup (1999–2013)
- LEN Euro League Women (2013–2022)
- LEN Champions League Women (2022–2023)
- European Aquatics Women's Champions League (since 2024)

== Format ==
Over the years, different formats have been used in the competition, either Round-robin or Knockout or both combined (round-robin at early stages and knockout at final stages). Since the 2007–08 season, the competition has been played in four stages (qualification round, preliminary round, quarter final round and final four).

== Title holders ==
- 1987–88: (Netherlands) Donk Gouda
- 1988–89: (Netherlands) Donk Gouda
- 1989–90: (Netherlands) Nereus
- 1990–91: (Netherlands) Donk Gouda
- 1991–92: (Netherlands) Brandenburg
- 1992–93: (Hungary) Szentes
- 1993–94: (Italy) Orizzonte Catania
- 1994–95: (Netherlands) Nereus
- 1995–96: (Netherlands) Nereus
- 1996–97: (Russia) SKIF Moscow
- 1997–98: (Italy) Orizzonte Catania
- 1998–99: (Russia) SKIF Moscow
- 1999–00: (Greece) Glyfada
- 2000–01: (Italy) Orizzonte Catania
- 2001–02: (Italy) Orizzonte Catania
- 2002–03: (Greece) Glyfada
- 2003–04: (Italy) Orizzonte Catania
- 2004–05: (Italy) Orizzonte Catania
- 2005–06: (Italy) Orizzonte Catania
- 2006–07: (Italy) Fiorentina
- 2007–08: (Italy) Orizzonte Catania
- 2008–09: (Greece) Vouliagmeni
- 2009–10: (Greece) Vouliagmeni
- 2010–11: (Spain) Astralpool Sabadell
- 2011–12: (Italy) Pro Recco
- 2012–13: (Spain) Astralpool Sabadell
- 2013–14: (Spain) Astralpool Sabadell
- 2014–15: (Greece) Olympiacos
- 2015–16: (Spain) Astralpool Sabadell
- 2016–17: (Russia) Kinef Kirishi
- 2017–18: (Russia) Kinef Kirishi
- 2018–19: (Spain) Astralpool Sabadell
- 2019–20: Cancelled due to COVID-19 pandemic
- 2020–21: (Greece) Olympiacos
- 2021–22: (Greece) Olympiacos
- 2022–23: (Spain) Astralpool Sabadell
- 2023–24: (Spain) Astralpool Sabadell
- 2024–25: (Spain) Sant Andreu
- 2025–26: (Greece) Olympiacos

== Finals ==
Year	Finalists			Semi-finalists	
Year	Champion	Score	Runner-up	Third place	Fourth place
1987–88; Details	(Netherlands); Donk Gouda	15–10	(France); Dauphins Créteil	(Hungary); Szentes	(Italy); Volturno
1988–89; Details	(Netherlands); Donk Gouda	Round-robin (14–12)	(Hungary); Vasutas	(Italy); Volturno	(West Germany); SU Neukölln
1989–90; Details	(Netherlands); Nereus	21–6 / 11–6	(Hungary); Vasutas	(West Germany); SU Neukölln	(Italy); Volturno
1990–91; Details	(Netherlands); Donk Gouda	8–6	(Italy); Volturno	(Germany); SU Neukölln	(Hungary); Szentes
1991–92; Details	(Netherlands); Brandenburg	12–8	(Russia); Uralochka Zlatoust	(Hungary); Vasutas	(France); Dauphins Créteil
1992–93; Details	(Hungary); Szentes	6–5	(Italy); Orizzonte Catania	(Netherlands); Donk Gouda	(Russia); Uralochka Zlatoust
1993–94; Details	(Italy); Orizzonte Catania	6–3	(Netherlands); Nereus	(Hungary); Vasutas	(Greece); Vouliagmeni
1994–95; Details	(Netherlands); Nereus	7–7 (9–8 a.e.t.)	(Italy); Orizzonte Catania	(Hungary); Szentes	(France); Nancy
1995–96; Details	(Netherlands); Nereus	8–7 (a.e.t.)	(Russia); SKIF Moscow	(Italy); Orizzonte Catania	(Greece); Olympiacos
1996–97; Details	(Russia); SKIF Moscow	7–6	(Netherlands); Nereus	(Italy); Orizzonte Catania	(Spain); Mediterrani
1997–98; Details	(Italy); Orizzonte Catania	7–6 (a.e.t.)	(Russia); SKIF Moscow	(Netherlands); Nereus	(Hungary); Szentes
1998–99; Details	(Russia); SKIF Moscow	8–6	(Netherlands); Donk Gouda	(Italy); Orizzonte Catania	(Hungary); BEAC
1999–00; Details	(Greece); Glyfada	7–5	(Russia); SKIF Moscow	(Hungary); Szentes	(Italy); Orizzonte Catania
2000–01; Details	(Italy); Orizzonte Catania	Round-robin (12–6)	(Greece); Glyfada	(Russia); Uralochka Zlatoust	(Hungary); Szentes
2001–02; Details	(Italy); Orizzonte Catania	Round-robin (6–6)	(Russia); Uralochka Zlatoust	(Greece); Glyfada	(Hungary); Dunaújváros
2002–03; Details	(Greece); Glyfada	Round-robin (6–4)	(Hungary); Dunaújváros	(Russia); Uralochka Zlatoust	(Italy); Orizzonte Catania
2003–04; Details	(Italy); Orizzonte Catania	Round-robin (6–4)	(Greece); Glyfada	(Hungary); Dunaújváros	(Greece); Vouliagmeni
2004–05; Details	(Italy); Orizzonte Catania	Round-robin (6–5)	(Russia); Kinef Kirishi	(Hungary); Dunaújváros	(Germany); Blau-Weiss Bochum
2005–06; Details	(Italy); Orizzonte Catania	Round-robin (14–11)	(Russia); Kinef Kirishi	(Hungary); Dunaújváros	(Greece); Vouliagmeni
2006–07; Details	(Italy); Fiorentina	Round-robin (12–10)	(Russia); Kinef Kirishi	(Greece); Glyfada	(Russia); Uralochka Zlatoust
2007–08; Details	(Italy); Orizzonte Catania	11–11 (14–13 a.e.t.)	(Greece); Vouliagmeni	(Italy); Fiorentina	(Netherlands); ZVL
2008–09; Details	(Greece); Vouliagmeni	12–9	(Italy); Orizzonte Catania	(Russia); Kinef Kirishi	(Hungary); Honvéd
2009–10; Details	(Greece); Vouliagmeni	10–7	(Russia); Kinef Kirishi	(Italy); Orizzonte Catania	(Greece); Olympiacos
2010–11; Details	(Spain); Astralpool Sabadell	13–8	(Italy); Orizzonte Catania	(Greece); Olympiacos	(Russia); Kinef Kirishi
2011–12; Details	(Italy); Pro Recco	8–7	(Greece); Vouliagmeni	(Russia); Kinef Kirishi	(Italy); Orizzonte Catania
2012–13; Details	(Spain); Astralpool Sabadell	13–11	(Russia); Kinef Kirishi	(Greece); Vouliagmeni	(Hungary); Eger
2013–14; Details	(Spain); Astralpool Sabadell	19–10	(Greece); Vouliagmeni	(Italy); Orizzonte Catania	(Italy); Imperia
2014–15; Details	(Greece); Olympiacos	10–9	(Spain); Astralpool Sabadell	(Russia); Kinef Kirishi	(Hungary); UVSE Budapest
2015–16; Details	(Spain); Astralpool Sabadell	11–8	(Hungary); UVSE Budapest	(Russia); Kinef Kirishi	(Greece); Olympiacos
2016–17; Details	(Russia); Kinef Kirishi	7–6	(Greece); Olympiacos	(Spain); Astralpool Sabadell	(Spain); Mataró
2017–18; Details	(Russia); Kinef Kirishi	8–8 (5–4 p.s.o.)	(Spain); Astralpool Sabadell	(Italy); Ekipe Orizzonte	(Hungary); UVSE Budapest
2018–19; Details	(Spain); Astralpool Sabadell	13–11	(Greece); Olympiacos	(Greece); Vouliagmeni	(Italy); Plebiscito Padova
2019–20; Details	Cancelled due to the COVID-19 pandemic in Europe				
2020–21; Details	(Greece); Olympiacos	7–6	(Hungary); Dunaújváros	(Hungary); UVSE Hunguest Hotel	(Russia); Uralochka Zlatoust
2021–22; Details	(Greece); Olympiacos	11–7	(Spain); Astralpool Sabadell	(Italy); Plebiscito Padova	(Hungary); UVSE Hunguest Hotel
2022–23; Details	(Spain); Astralpool Sabadell	9–8	(Spain); Assolim Mataró	(Italy); Ekipe Orizzonte	(Hungary); Dunaújváros
2023–24; Details	(Spain); Astralpool Sabadell	16–10	(Greece); Olympiacos	(Spain); Sant Andreu	(Spain); Assolim Mataró
2024–25; Details	(Spain); Sant Andreu	9–8	(Spain); Astralpool Sabadell	(Greece); Olympiacos	(Hungary); FTC-Telekom
2025–26; Details	(Greece); Olympiacos	14–14 (3–0 p.s.o.)	(Hungary); FTC-Telekom	(Spain); Sant Andreu	(Spain); Assolim Mataró

Source: LEN (from 1987 to 2016).

== Titles by club ==
Rank	Club	Titles	Runner-up	Champion Years
1.	(Italy) Orizzonte Catania	8	4	1993–94, 1997–98, 2000–01, 2001–02, 2003–04, 2004–05, 2005–06, 2007–08
2.	(Spain) Sabadell	7	4	2010–11, 2012–13, 2013–14, 2015–16, 2018–19, 2022–23, 2023–24
3.	(Greece) Olympiacos	4	3	2014–15, 2020–21, 2021–22, 2025–26
4.	(Netherlands) Nereus	3	2	1989–90, 1994–95, 1995–96
5.	(Netherlands) Donk Gouda	3	1	1987–88, 1988–89, 1990–91
6.	(Russia) Kinef Kirishi	2	5	2016–17, 2017–18
7.	(Russia) SKIF Moscow	2	3	1996–97, 1998–99
	(Greece) Vouliagmeni	2	3	2008–09, 2009–10
9.	(Greece) Glyfada	2	2	1999–00, 2002–03
10.	(Netherlands) Brandenburg	1		1991–92
	(Hungary) Szentes	1		1992–93
	(Italy) Fiorentina	1		2006–07
	(Italy) Pro Recco	1		2011–12
	(Spain) Sant Andreu	1		2024–25
15.	(Russia) Uralochka Zlatoust		2
	(Hungary) Dunaújváros		2
	(Hungary) Vasutas		2
18.	(France) Dauphins Créteil		1
	(Hungary) UVSE		1
	(Spain) Assolim Mataró		1
	(Italy) Volturno		1
	(Hungary) FTC-Telekom		1

== Titles by nation ==
Rank	Country	Titles	Runners-up
1.	Italy	10	5
2.	Greece	8	8
3.	Spain	8	5
4.	Netherlands	7	3
5.	Russia	4	10
6.	Hungary	1	6
7.	France		1

=== Most Titles ===
Incomplete list.

==== Players ====
bold - active players

Player	Titles	Clubs	
Player	Titles	#	List
(Italy) Silvia Bosurgi	7	1	Orizzonte Catania 1998, 2001, 2002, 2004, 2005, 2006, 2008
(Italy) Tania Di Mario	7	1	Orizzonte Catania 1998, 2001, 2002, 2004, 2005, 2006, 2008
(Spain) Laura Ester	7	1	Sabadell 2011, 2013, 2014, 2016, 2019, 2023, 2024
(Spain) Maica García Godoy	7	1	Sabadell 2011, 2013, 2014, 2016, 2019, 2023, 2024
(Spain) Matilde Ortiz	7	1	Sabadell 2011, 2013, 2014, 2016, 2019, 2023, 2024
(Spain) Judith Forca	7	1	Sabadell 2011, 2013, 2014, 2016, 2019, 2023, 2024
(Italy) Maddalena Musumeci	6	1	Orizzonte Catania 1998, 2001, 2002, 2004, 2006, 2008
(Italy) Chiara Brancati	6	1	Orizzonte Catania 2001, 2002, 2004, 2005, 2006, 2008
(Italy) Giusi Malato	6	1	Orizzonte Catania 1994, 1998, 2001, 2002, 2004, 2005
(Italy) Francesca Cristiana Conti	5	1	Orizzonte Catania 1994, 1998, 2001, 2002, 2004
(Italy) Cinzia Ragusa	5	1	Orizzonte Catania 1998, 2001, 2002, 2004, 2008
(Spain) Anni Espar	5	1	Sabadell 2011, 2013, 2014, 2016, 2019
(Spain) Olga Doménech	5	1	Sabadell 2011, 2013, 2014, 2016, 2019
(Spain) María del Pilar Peña	4	1	Sabadell 2011, 2013, 2014, 2016
(Spain) Jennifer Pareja	4	1	Sabadell 2011, 2013, 2014, 2016

Notes: Maddalena Musumeci played her whole career for Orizzonte Catania but was inactive in 2005.

==== Coaches ====
Coach	Titles	Clubs	
Coach	Titles	#	List
(Italy) Mauro Maugeri	6	1	Orizzonte Catania 1994, 2001, 2002, 2004, 2005, 2006
(Spain) Ignasi Guiu	4	1	Sabadell 2011, 2013, 2014, 2016
(Spain) David Palma Lopera	3	1	Sabadell 2019, 2023, 2024

== See also ==
=== Men ===
- European Aquatics Champions League
- European Aquatics Euro Cup
- European Aquatics Conference Cup
- European Aquatics Challenger Cup
- European Aquatics Super Cup

=== Women ===
- European Aquatics Women's Euro Cup
- European Aquatics Women's Conference Cup
- European Aquatics Women's Challenger Cup
- European Aquatics Women's Super Cup
