= Championnat de France (women's water polo) =

Women's water polo championship in France

- Founded: 1983
- Country: France
- Confederation: FFN
- Number of clubs: 7
- Domestic cup(s): Coupe de France
- International cup(s): LEN Champions Cup
- Current champions: Olympic Nice (2011–12)
- Most championships: Nancy (13)
- Website: FFN website

The Championnat de France de water-polo féminin is the premier championship for women's water polo clubs in France. First held in 1983, it is currently contested by seven teams. It is currently granted two spots in the Champions Cup and two in the LEN Trophy.

== 2011-12 Teams ==
- (Île-de-France) Choisy-le-Roi
- (Nord-Pas-de-Calais) Lille
- (Lorraine) Nancy
- (Provence-Alpes-Côte d'Azur) Olympic Nice
- (Poitou-Charentes) St. Jean d'Angély
- (Alsace) Strasbourg
- (Aquitaine) Union Saint-Bruno

== Champions ==
- (Lorraine) Nancy (13)
  - 1994, 1995, 1996, 1997, 1998, 2000, 2001, 2002, 2003, 2004, 2005, 2006, 2008
- (Île-de-France) Dauphins Créteil (8)
  - 1986, 1987, 1988, 1989, 1990, 1991, 1992, 1993
- (Provence-Alpes-Côte d'Azur) Olympic Nice (5)
  - 2007, 2009, 2010, 2011, 2012
- (Île-de-France) Racing France (3)
  - 1983, 1984, 1985
- (Nord-Pas-de-Calais) Pélican Valenciennes (1)
  - 1999

== See also ==
- Championnat de France (male counterpart)
