= 2014–15 LEN Euro League Women =

Water polo tournament

The 2014–15 LEN Women's Champions' Cup was the 28th edition of LEN's premier competition for women's water polo clubs, running from 15 January 2015 to 25 April 2015. This was the second edition of the new format which saw twenty teams from thirteen countries.

== Final four ==
=== Squads ===
The final four squads were Kinef Kirishi, Olympiacos, CN Sabadell and UVSE Central.

=== Kinef Kirishi ===
No.	Name	Position
1	Anna Karnaukh	Goalkeeper
2	Tatiana Zubkova	
3	Ekaterina Prokofyeva	
4	Anastasia Simanovich	
5	Viktoriia Kurochkina	
6	Kseniia Krimer	
7	Kseniia Balai	
8	Ekaterina Kirilcheva	
9	Ekaterina Iakusheva	
10	Evgeniia Khokhriakova	
11	Evgeniya Ivanova	
12	Daria Ryzhkova	
13	Polina Iushkova	Goalkeeper

=== Olympiacos ===
No.	Name	Position
1	Chrysoula Diamantopoulou	Goalkeeper
2	Evdokia Tetzalidou	
3	Eleftheria Plevritou	
4	Maria Sora	
5	Triantafyllia Manolioudaki	
6	Alkisti Avramidou	
7	Alexandra Asimaki	
8	Margarita Plevritou	
9	Michaela Kalogerakou	
10	Ashleigh Southern	
11	Roberta Bianconi	
12	Virginia Niarchakou	
13	Ioanna Stamatopoulou	Goalkeeper

=== CN Sabadell ===
No.	Name	Position
1	Laura Ester	Goalkeeper
2	Matilde Ortiz	
3	Anna Espar	
4	Dagmar Genee	
5	Carla Abellan	
6	Jennifer Pareja	
7	Marina Cordobes	
8	Maria Garcia	
9	Maria Peña	
10	Melissa Seidemann	
11	Olga Domenech	
12	Judith Forca	
13	Elena Sánchez	Goalkeeper

=== UVSE Central ===
No.	Name	Position
1	Edina Gangl	Goalkeeper
2	Szonja Kuna	
3	Vivien Kovesdi	
4	Hanna Kisteleki	
5	Gabriella Szűcs	
6	Rita Keszthelyi	
7	Diana Sikter	
8	Orsolya Hertzka	
9	Ildiko Toth	
10	Dora Csabai	
11	Franciska Azumah	
12	Alexandra Sudduth-Kiss	
13	Alexandra Kiss	Goalkeeper
