= 2015 Women's LEN Super Cup =

Water polo match

The 2015 Women's LEN Super Cup was a water polo match organized by LEN and contested by the reigning champions of the two main European club competitions, the 2014–15 LEN Women's Champions' Cup and the 2014-15 Women's LEN Trophy.

The match between Greek team Olympiacos and Italian CS Plebiscito Padova was played on 20 November 2015 in the Papastrateio Hall in Piraeus, the home turf of Olympiacos. They defeated Padova 10-6.

== Squads ==
The members of the two squads were as follows.

=== Olympiacos SFP ===
No.	Name	Date of birth	Position	Height
1	Chrysoula Diamantopoulou	22 September 1995	Goalkeeper	185 cm
2	Evdokia Tetzalidou	21 February 1990	Centre back	170 cm
3	Eleftheria Plevritou	23 April 1997	Driver	178 cm
4	Maria Sora	10 June 1994	Driver	162 cm
5	Triantafyllia Manolioudaki	19 March 1986	Driver	170 cm
6	Alkisti Avramidou	26 February 1988	Driver	170 cm
7	Alexandra Asimaki	28 June 1988	Centre forward	175 cm
8	Margarita Plevritou	17 November 1994	Centre back	179 cm
9	Giulia Enrica Emmolo	16 October 1991	Driver	165 cm
10	Vasiliki Plevritou	8 June 1998	Driver	175 cm
11	Roberta Bianconi	8 July 1989	Driver	177 cm
12	Virginia Niarchakou	5 December 1996	Centre forward	168 cm
13	Ioanna Stamatopoulou	17 June 1998	Goalkeeper	185 cm
14	Nikoleta Eleftheriadou	17 January 1998		170 cm
15	Vasiliki Ourania Logotheti	4 October 1998		168 cm
16	Adamantia Doureka	26 September 1998		165 cm
18	Monika Catharina Eggens	25 December 1990		185 cm

=== Plebiscito Padova ===
No.	Name	Date of birth	Position	Height
1	Laura Teani	13 February 1991	Goalkeeper	
2	Laura Barzon	14 May 1992		
3	Ilaria Savioli	6 September 1990		
4	Maddalena Fisco	8 June 1996		
5	Martina Savioli	6 September 1990		
6	Elisa Queirolo	6 March 1991		
7	Alessia Millo	18 November 1993		
8	Sara Dario	17 October 1994		
9	Federica Rocco	25 November 1984		
10	Christine Robinson	17 May 1984		
11	Carlotta Nencha	18 February 1997		
12	Letizia Lascialanda'	23 March 1991		
13	Stella Franceschino	20 May 1999	Goalkeeper	
