= 1987 LEN Women's Champions' Cup =

European women's water polo tournament

The 1987 LEN Women's Champions' Cup was the inaugural edition of the premier competition for European women's water polo national champion clubs, organized by LEN and held in France.

The final four were played in December 1987 between Dauphins Créteil, Donk Gouda, Szentes and Volturno with Dutch club Donk Gauda becoming the first European champions by beating host Dauphins Créteil in the final.

== Final four ==
Créteil, France

Semifinals
(Netherlands) Donk Gouda	14
(Hungary) Szentes	10
(France) Dauphins Créteil	05
(Italy) Volturno	06

Final
(Netherlands) Donk Gouda	15
(France) Dauphins Créteil	10
Third place
(Hungary) Szentes	12
(Italy) Volturno	9
