= 2013 in aquatic sports =

This article lists the in the water and on the water forms of aquatic sports for 2013.

== Aquatics ==
- January 27 – October 5: FINA 10 km Marathon Swimming World Cup 2013
  - January 27 at Santos, Brazil
    - Men's winner: (France) Romain Beraud
    - Women's winner: (United States) Emily Brunemann
  - February 2 at Viedma, Argentina
    - Men's winner: (France) Romain Beraud
    - Women's winner: (United States) Emily Brunemann
  - March 1 at Eilat, Israel
    - Men's winner: (Germany) Christian Reichert
    - Women's winner: (Brazil) Ana Marcela Cunha
  - April 15 at Cozumel, Mexico
    - Men's winner: (United Kingdom) Daniel Fogg
    - Women's winner: (Italy) Martina Grimaldi
  - July 25 at Lac Saint-Jean, Quebec, Canada
    - Men's winner: (Germany) Alexander Studzinsky
    - Women's winner: (United States) Emily Brunemann
  - August 10 at Lac-Mégantic, Quebec, Canada
    - Men's winner: (Germany) Thomas Lurz
    - Women's winner: (Italy) Martina Grimaldi
  - September 29 at Shantou, China
    - Men's winner: (Germany) Thomas Lurz
    - Women's winner: (Brazil) Poliana Okimoto
  - October 5 at Hong Kong
    - Men's winner: (Brazil) Samuel de Bona
    - Women's winner: (Brazil) Poliana Okimoto
- March 15 – May 26: FINA Diving World Cup 2013
  - Men's 3m springboard overall winner: (Mexico) Yahel Castillo
  - Men's 10m platform overall winner: (Russia) Victor Minibaev
  - Men's 3m springboard synchro overall winner: China
  - Men's 10m platform synchro overall winner: Russia
  - Women's 3m springboard overall winner: (China) He Zi
  - Women's 10m platform overall winner: (China) Si Yajie
  - Women's 3m springboard synchro overall winner: China
  - Women's 10m platform synchro overall winner: China
- July 19 – August 4: 2013 World Aquatics Championships in Barcelona, Spain
  - The United States won both the gold and overall medal tallies.
- August 7 – November 14: FINA Swimming World Cup 2013
  - Overall men's winner: (South Africa) Chad le Clos
  - Overall women's winner: (Hungary) Katinka Hosszú

== Canoe sprint (flatwater racing) ==
- May 10 – June 2: 2013 ICF Canoe Sprint World Cup
  - May 10–12 at Szeged
    - Hungary won both gold and overall medal tallies.
  - May 17–19 at (Czech Republic) Račice
    - Germany won both gold and overall medal tallies.
  - May 31 – June 2 at Poznań
    - Canada won the gold medal count; Poland won the overall medal count.
- June 14–16: 2013 Canoe Sprint European Championships in (Portugal) Montemor-o-Velho
  - Russia won the gold medal count; Germany won the overall medal count.
- August 1–4: 2013 ICF Junior and U23 Canoe Sprint World Championships in (Canada) Welland
  - Hungary won the gold medal tally; Russia won the overall medal tally.
- August 27 – September 1: 2013 ICF Canoe Sprint World Championships in Duisburg
  - Germany won the gold medal tally; Hungary won the overall medal tally. (Canoe category)
  - United Kingdom won both the gold and overall medal tallies in the Paracanoe category.

== Rowing ==
- March 22–24: Samsung World Rowing Cup (I) at Sydney
  - Overall winner: Australia
- June 21–23: Samsung World Rowing Cup (II) at Eton Dorney
  - Overall winner: United Kingdom
- July 12–14: Samsung World Rowing Cup (III) at (Switzerland) Lucerne
  - Overall winner: United Kingdom
- July 24–28: 2013 World Rowing U23 Championships at (Austria) Linz-Ottensheim
  - Germany, Italy, and Romania are tied for the gold medal tally. However, Germany won the overall medal tally.
- August 7–11: 2013 World Rowing Junior Championships in (Lithuania) Trakai
  - Germany won both the gold and overall medal tallies.
- August 25 – September 1: 2013 World Rowing Championships in (South Korea) Chungju
  - Italy, Australia, and United Kingdom all tied in the gold medal tally. Italy, United Kingdom, United States, and Germany all tied in the overall medal tally.

== Sailing (yachting) ==
- December 2, 2012 – April 27, 2013: ISAF Sailing World Cup
  - Australia wins both the gold and overall medal tallies.
- July 13–20: 2013 ISAF Youth Sailing World Championships in (Cyprus) Limassol
  - There were eight nations with, at least, one gold medal each. That is equal to all eligible events in this championship. However, Australia gets top spot here because of one silver medal that was won, along with the one gold medal. Italy won the overall medal tally.
- September 7–25: 2013 America's Cup at San Francisco
  - (United States) Oracle Team USA defeated Emirates Team New Zealand 9–8, to defend the American team's Cup win from 2010.

== Water polo ==
- September 26, 2012 – June 1, 2013: 2012–13 LEN Champions League
  - Winner: (Serbia) VK Crvena Zvezda (first title).
- November 22, 2012 – April 27, 2013: 2012–13 LEN Women's Champions' Cup
  - Winner: (Spain) CN Sabadell (second title).
- June 1–6: Women's 2013 FINA Water Polo World League super final in Beijing
  - Champions: China; Second: Russia; Third: United States
- June 11–16: Men's 2013 FINA Water Polo World League super final in (Russia) Chelyabinsk
  - Champions: Serbia; Second: Hungary; Third: Montenegro
- Water polo at the 2013 World Aquatics Championships – Men's tournament
  - Champions: Hungary (third title); Second: Montenegro; Third: Croatia
- Water polo at the 2013 World Aquatics Championships – Women's tournament
  - Champions: Spain (first title); Second: Australia; Third: Hungary

== Whitewater (canoe) slalom ==
- June 21 – August 25: 2013 Canoe Slalom World Cup
  - June 21–23 at Cardiff
    - Overall winner: United Kingdom
  - June 28–30 at Augsburg
    - Gold medal winner: France; Overall medal winner: Germany
  - July 5–7 at (Spain) La Seu d'Urgell
    - Gold medal winners (tie): France and Slovenia; Overall medal winner: Czech Republic
  - August 16–18 at Ljubljana – Tacen
    - Host nation, Slovenia, won both the gold and overall medal tallies.
  - August 23–25: World Cup Final at Bratislava – Čunovo
    - France won the gold medal tally. France and host nation, Slovakia, tied in the overall medal tally.
- July 17–21: 2013 ICF Canoe Slalom Junior and U23 World Championships at Liptovský Mikuláš
  - Gold medal winners (tie): Czech Republic and the Slovakia host team; Overall medal winner: Czech Republic
- September 12–15: 2013 ICF Canoe Slalom World Championships in Prague
  - The host nation, the Czech Republic, won both the gold and overall medal tallies.
