= Carla Abellán =

Spanish water polo player (born 1997)

Carla Abellan
Personal information
- Full name: Carla Abellan
- Born: 31 July 1997 (age 29) Terrassa, Spain
- Height: 1.75 m (5 ft 9 in)

Sport
- Sport: Water polo
- Handedness: right
- College team: University of Hawaii
Medal record
Women's water polo
Representing Spain

Carla Abellan (31 July 1997 Terrassa) is a Spanish water polo player, who played for CN Sabadell.

She participated in the 2013 Women's LEN Super Cup, 2014 Women's LEN Super Cup, 2014–15 LEN Euro League Women, and 2014 European U19 Women's Championships.

She plays for University of Hawaii.
