= BZC Brandenburg =

Biltsche Zwemclub Brandenburg is a swimming and water polo club based in the Dutch town of Bilthoven.

== History ==
Biltsche Zwemclub Brandenburg was founded on August 18, 1926. BZC Brandenburg comes from the Biltsche Swim Club was founded on May 14, 1926. Since the First World War there were different activities under that name.

== Water polo ==
The women's team of BZC Bradenburg plays in the women national league. The team has won the Dutch national league twice and was European champion once.

In addition, the men's team are active in the first division, where they compete in the upper echelons.

Youth is also very active in national top level, in the form of participation in National Championships. Many youth therefore selected for Dutch teams and the Utrecht team.

== Honours ==
=== Women's water polo ===
Domestic

Dutch League

- Winners (2): 1990–91, 2005–06

KNZB Cup 2 (ManMeer!-Cup)

- Winners (1): 1998–99

International

LEN Women's Champions' Cup

- Winners (1): 1991–92
