= Championnat de France (water polo) =

French water polo league

- Sport: water polo
- Founded: 1896 (M); 1983 (W)
- No. of teams: 10 (M); 7 (W)
- Country: France
- Most recent champions: CN Marseille (M); Olympic Nice (W)

The Championnat de France de water-polo is the premier category in the league system for water polo clubs in France. The men's championship was founded in 1896 by the French Athletic Sports Societies Union. Since 1921 the competition is organized by the newly founded French Swimming Federation. In 1983 the women's championship was founded.

Enfants de Neptune de Tourcoing and ASPTT Nancy are the most successful team in the championships with 46 and 13 titles, most recently in 1964 and 2008. On the other hand CN Marseille and Olympic Nice have been the leading teams in recent years. The men's 1956 and 1971 editions were declared vacant.

== List of champions ==
=== Men's championship ===
- Enfants de Neptune de Tourcoing (46)
  - 1909, 1910, 1911, 1912, 1913, 1914, 1915, 1916, 1917, 1918, 1919, 1920, 1921, 1922, 1923, 1925, 1926, 1927, 1928, 1929, 1930, 1931, 1932, 1933, 1934, 1935, 1936, 1937, 1938, 1939, 1940, 1941, 1942, 1943, 1944, 1945, 1946, 1947, 1948, 1949, 1950, 1952, 1953, 1954, 1957, 1964
- CN Marseille (43)
  - 1965, 1966, 1967, 1968, 1969, 1970, 1973, 1974, 1975, 1976, 1977, 1978, 1979, 1980, 1981, 1982, 1983, 1984, 1985, 1986, 1987, 1988, 1989, 1990, 1991, 1996, 2005, 2006, 2007, 2008, 2009, 2010, 2011, 2013, 2015, 2016, 2017, 2021, 2022, 2023, 2024, 2025, 2026
- Olympic Nice (8)
  - 1997, 1998, 1999, 2000, 2001, 2002, 2003, 2004
- SN Strasbourg (7)
  - 1958, 1959, 1960, 1961, 1963, 2018, 2019
- Libellule de Paris (5)
  - 1902, 1903, 1904, 1907, 1924
- Cacel Nice (4)
  - 1992, 1993, 1994, 1995
- Pupilles de Neptune (3)
  - 1896, 1900, 1901
- CA Paris (3)
  - 1905, 1906, 1908
- Racing Club de France
  - 1951, 1955
- Montpellier Water Polo
  - 2012, 2014
- SCN Choisy-le-Rei
  - 1962
- Pélican Club Valenciennes
  - 1972

=== Women's championship ===
- ASPTT Nancy
  - 1994, 1995, 1996, 1997, 1998, 2000, 2001, 2002, 2003, 2004, 2005, 2006, 2008
- Dauphins de Créteil
  - 1986, 1987, 1988, 1989, 1990, 1991, 1992, 1993
- Olympic Nice
  - 2007, 2009, 2010, 2011, 2012, 2012
- Racing Club de France
  - 1983, 1984, 1985

== Current teams ==
=== 2022-23 Men's championship ===
- Dauphins de Sète
- Lille
- Marseille
- Montpellier
- Olympic Nice
- Noisy-le-Sec
- Pays d'Aix
- Reims
- Strasbourg

=== 2011-12 Women's championship ===
- Choisy-le-Roi
- Lille
- Nancy
- Olympic Nice
- St. Bruno
- St. Jean d'Angély
- Strasbourg
