= Karya Köse =

Turkish water polo player

Personal information
- Nationality: Turkish
- Born: 20 January 1997 (age 29)
- Height: 165 cm (65 in)
- Weight: 60 kg (132 lb)

Sport
- Sport: Water polo
- Handedness: Right
- Position: Wing
- Current club: Ege Water Sports and Tennis Club
- Number: 5
National team
- Years: Team
- 2016: Turkey

Karya Köse (born 20 January 1997) is a Turkish female water polo player, playing at the wing position. She is part of the Turkey women's national water polo team. She competed at the 2016 Women's European Water Polo Championship.

She is a member of Ege Water Sports and Tennis Club.
