= Virginia Niarchakou =

Greek water polo player

Personal information
- Nationality: Greece
- Born: 5 December 1996 (age 29)

Sport
- Sport: Water polo
- Position: centre forward

Senior clubs
- Years: Team
- ?-?: Olympiacos

Virginia Niarchakou (born 5 December 1996) is a Greek female water polo player, playing as a centre forward. As a player of Olympiacos she won the 2014–15 LEN Euro League Women, the 2015 Women's LEN Super Cup and the 2014 Women's LEN Trophy.
