= Volturno SC =

Italian Club Which plays in the 3rd Division of Italian Football the *SERIE C*

- Founded: 1981
- League: Serie A1 (men); Serie A (women)
- Based in: Santa Maria Capua Vetere, Italy
- Colors: Yellow and green
- Championships: 1 COMEN Cup (men); 7 Italian Leagues (women)
- Website: http://volturnosc.altervista.org/blog/

Volturno Sporting Club is an Italian water polo club based in the city of Santa Maria Capua Vetere, Campania, Italy.

== History ==
The history of Volturno SC began in November 1981, when a water polo fans group led by the judge Raffaele Sapienza, founded the club and enrolled at water polo championship of Serie D, for the first time in history. The following year the team joins with Pallanuoto Napoli and participates in Serie C. In 1984 Volturno ranked in first place, but noting the title of Pro Salerno, the following year, it participates in the championship of A2. The "gialloverde" hired the Yugoslav Damir Polic and technical management is entrusted to Renato Notarangelo and they finished in the third place.

In 1985 Volturno competed in the first women's water polo championship recognized by the Federazione Italiana Nuoto and the women's team of Volturno, with driving Renato Notarangelo, won the title of Italian Champion.

Volturno SC is an association of water polo with extensive experience in Italian and European competitions. The women's team has won seven national titles in a row from 1985 to 1991. Meanwhile the first international victory came in 1992 at the Mediterranean COMEN Cup where Volturno prevailed in the final against Spanish Terrassa. The men's team reached the finals of serie A in the 1993-94 season but lost to the Posillipo from Naples. The same season Volturno reached the final of LEN Euro Cup where it faced Racing Roma.

== Honours ==
=== Men's team ===
Italian League

- Runners-up (1): 1993-94

LEN Cup Winners' Cup

- Runners-up (1): 1991-92

LEN Euro Cup

- Runners-up (1): 1993-94

COMEN Cup

- Winners (1): 1992

=== Women's team ===
Italian League

- Winners (7): 1984-85, 1985–86, 1986–87, 1987–88, 1988–89, 1989–90, 1990–91

LEN Euro League

- Semifinalist (1): 1987-88
