= Evi Tetzalidou =

Greek water polo player (born 1990)

Evdokia Tetzalidou
Personal information
- Nationality: Greece
- Born: 21 February 1990 (age 36)
- Height: 170 cm (67 in)

Sport
- Sport: Water polo
- Position: centre back

Senior clubs
- Years: Team
- –: Olympiacos

Evdokia Tetzalidou (Greek: Εύη Τετζαλίδου; born 21 February 1990) is a Greek retired water polo player, who played as a centre back for Olympiacos and Ethnikos in Greece. As a player of Olympiacos, Tetzalidou won the 2014–15 LEN Euro League Women, the 2015 Women's LEN Super Cup and the 2014 Women's LEN Trophy. She also won the 2010 Women's LEN Trophy with Ethnikos.
