= Maria Sora =

Greek water polo player

Personal information
- Nationality: Greece
- Born: 10 June 1994 (age 32)
- Height: 162 cm (64 in)

Sport
- Sport: Water polo
- Position: driver
- Current club: Olympiacos
- Number: 4

Senior clubs
- Years: Team
- ?-?: Olympiacos

Maria Sora (born 10 June 1994) is a Greek female water polo player. She plays for Olympiacos in Greece. She was a part of the team winning the 2014–15 LEN Euro League Women, the 2015 Women's LEN Super Cup and the 2014 Women's LEN Trophy.
