= Michaela Kalogerakou =

Greek water polo player

Personal information
- Nationality: Greece
- Born: 10 July 1998 (age 28)
- Height: 165 cm (65 in)
- Weight: 58 kg (128 lb)

Sport
- Sport: Water polo
- Position: Driver

Senior clubs
- Years: Team
- ?-?: Olympiacos
Medal record
Representing Greece
European Games
Bronze medal – third place	2015 Baku	Team

Michaela "Milva" Kalogerakou (born 10 July 1998) is a Greek female water polo player. She played for Olympiacos, with whom she won the 2014–15 LEN Euro League Women and the 2014 Women's LEN Trophy. She was part of the Greece women's team winning the bronze medal at the 2015 European Games in Baku. She started competing in water polo in 2013.
