= Dauphins de Créteil =

- Founded: 1973
- League: (France) French Championship
- Arena: St. Catherine, Créteil
- Championships: 8 French Leagues

Dauphins de Créteil is a French swimming and water polo club from Créteil, Paris founded in 1973. It is best known for its women's team, which won eight national championships in a row between 1986 and 1993. In 1987 it was the runner-up of the inaugural edition of the European Cup.

== Titles ==
- French Championship (8)
  - 1986, 1987, 1988, 1989, 1990, 1991, 1992, 1993
