= Olga Doménech =

Spanish water polo player (born 1988)

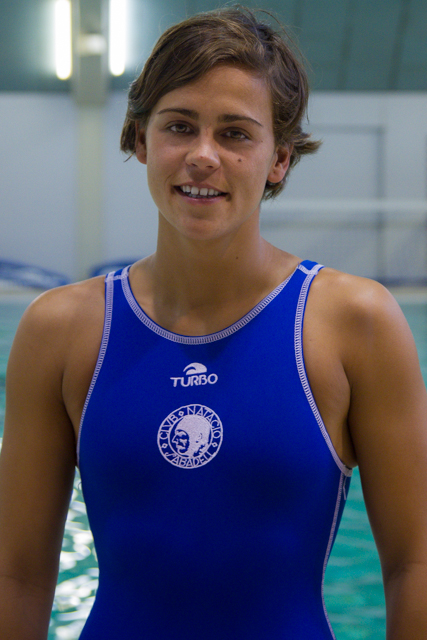

Personal information
- Full name: Olga Doménech Morales
- Born: 21 September 1988 (age 38) Sabadell, Spain

Sport
- Sport: Water polo
- Handedness: right
Medal record
Women's water polo
Representing Spain

Olga Doménech Morales (21 September 1988 Sabadell, Barcelona) is a Spanish water polo player, who plays for CN Sabadell.

She participated in the 2006 Women's European Water Polo Championship, 2009 Women's Water Polo World Championship, 2013 Women's LEN Super Cup, 2014 Women's LEN Super Cup, 2015–16 LEN Euro League Women, and 2016 Women's LEN Super Cup.
