= Ioanna Stamatopoulou =

Greek water polo player

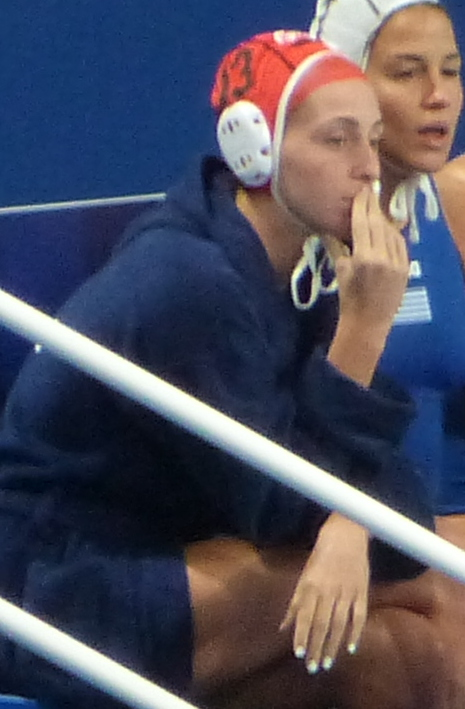

Personal information
- Nationality: Greek
- Born: 17 June 1998 (age 28) Marousi, Greece
- Height: 184 cm (72 in)
- Weight: 68 kg (150 lb)

Sport
- Sport: Water polo
- Position: Goalkeeper
- Current club: Olympiacos
- Number: 13

Senior clubs
- Years: Team
- –: Olympiacos
Medal record
Women's Water polo
Representing Greece
World Championship
Gold medal – first place	2025 Singapore	Team
European Championship
Silver medal – second place	2018 Barcelona
Silver medal – second place	2022 Split
Bronze medal – third place	2024 Eindhoven
Bronze medal – third place	2026 Funchal
European Games
Bronze medal – third place	2015 Baku	Team

Ioanna Stamatopoulou (Greek: Ιωάννα Σταματοπούλου, born 17 June 1998) is a Greek water polo player, playing as a goalkeeper for Olympiacos and the Greece women's national team.

As a player of Olympiacos, she won the 2014–15 LEN Euro League Women, the 2015 Women's LEN Super Cup and the 2014 Women's LEN Trophy.

She was part of the Greece women's national water polo team that won the silver medal at the 2018 European Championship in Barcelona and the bronze medal at the 2015 European Games in Baku. She started competing water polo in 2009 with the team of Ethnikos Piraeus before moving to Olympiacos in 2012.

In 2025, Stamatopoulou played a pivotal role for Greece's national team at the World Championships in Singapore, where they won the gold medal and she was named as the tournament's best goalkeeper.
