= Fiorentina Waterpolo =

Italian swimming and water polo club

- Founded: 1972
- League: Serie A1
- Based in: Florence
- Arena: Piscina di Bellariva
- Colors
- President: Fabio Frandi
- Head coach: Gianni de Magistris
- Championships: Women: 1 European Cup; 1 European Supercup; 1 Italian League

Fiorentina Waterpolo is an Italian swimming and water polo club from Florence.

Founded in 1972, it is best known for its women's team, which won the 2007 European Cup. Most recently it was 5th in the 2012 Serie A1 and played the 2012 LEN Trophy. The men's team plays in second-tier Series A2.

== Titles ==
- Women
  - LEN European Cup
    - 2007
  - LEN Supercup
    - 2007
  - Serie A1
    - 2007
