= Uerdinger SV 08 =

German water polo and swimming club

Bayer Uerdingen
- Founded: 1908
- League: Deutsche Wasserball-Liga
- Based in: Uerdingen, Krefeld
- Colors
- Head coach: Sybille Kaisers (W); Rainer Hoppe (M)
- Championships: Women: 1 German League; 1 German Cup; Men: 1 German League
- Website: http://www.svbayer08.de

Schwimmverein Bayer Uerdingen 08 e.V. is a German water polo and swimming club from the Uerdingen district of Krefeld.

Bayer Uerdingen men's team won the Wasserball-Liga in 1926, while its women's team won its first championship in 1994. In 2007 the latter won the national cup, and between 2006 and 2011 it was the championship runner-up (second to Blau-Weiss Bochum) on five occasions, earning a spot in the European Cup.

== Titles ==
- Women
  - Wasserball-Liga
    - 1994
  - Wasserball-Pokal
    - 2007
- Men
  - Wasserball-Liga
    - 1926
