= Olympic Nice Natation =

Swimming club in Nice, France

Olympic Nice
- Founded: 1989
- League: French Championship; French Women's Chp.
- Based in: Nice
- Colors
- Championships: Men: 8 French Leagues; 4 French Cups; 1 French League Cup; Women: 4 French Leagues; 2 French Cups
- Website: olympicnice.fr

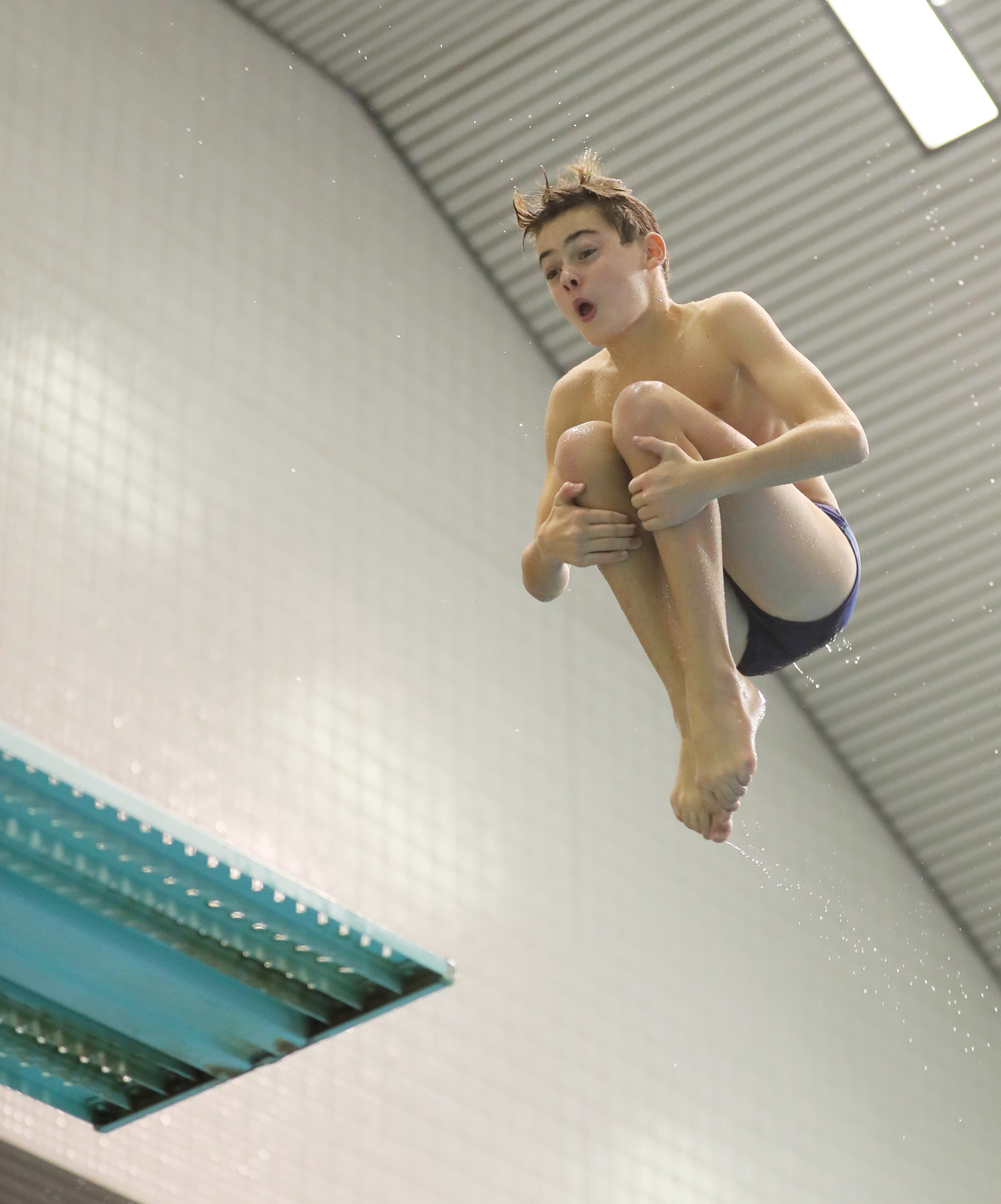
Olympic Nice Natation diver

Olympic Nice Natation is a French water polo and swimming club from Nice, founded in 1989.

Its men's team won eight national championships in a row between 1997 and 2004, while its women's team has been successful in recent years, with four championships since 2007. Most recently the women's team played the 2012 European Cup.

== Titles ==
- Men
  - Championnat de France
    - 1997, 1998, 1999, 2000, 2001, 2002, 2003, 2004
  - Coupe de France
    - 1999, 2000, 2001, 2002
  - Coupe de la Ligue
    - 2003
- Women
  - Championnat de France
    - 2007, 2009, 2010, 2011
  - Coupe de France
    - 2010, 2011
