= ASPTT Nancy =

Water polo team in Nancy, France

- Founded: 1941 (M); 1985 (W)
- League: Championnat de France
- Based in: Nancy
- Colors
- Championships: Women: 13 French Leagues; 1 French Cup
- Website: http://www.aspttnancywaterpolo.com

ASPTT Nancy Water-Polo is a French water polo team from Nancy. It is a section of the ASPTT Nancy multisports club.

Its women's team dominated the French Championship between 1994 and 2008 with thirteen titles. In subsequent years it has been second to Olympic Nice, but it still remains a regular in the European Cup.

== Titles ==
- Championnat de France (13)
  - 1994, 1995, 1996, 1997, 1998, 2000, 2001, 2002, 2003, 2004, 2005, 2006, 2008
- Coupe de France (1)
  - 2000
