= AS Orizzonte Catania =

Italian women's water polo club

Orizzonte Catania
- Founded: 1985
- League: Serie A
- Based in: Catania
- Arena: Piscina di Nesima
- Colors
- President: Martina Miceli
- Head coach: Martina Miceli
- Manager: Tania Di Mario
- Championships: 8 European Cups; 26 Italian Leagues
- Website: https://ekipeorizzonte.com/

Associazione Sportiva Orizzonte Catania Waterpolo, also known as Ekipe Orizzonte for sponsorship reasons, is an Italian professional women's water polo club from Catania.

Founded in 1985, Orizzonte has dominated the Italian championship in the past two decades, winning every edition between 1992 and 2011 except for 2007, and is also the most successful team in the LEN Champions' Cup with eight titles between 1994 and 2008, including three in a row in the mid-2000s. Most recently it was the competition's runner-up in 2011.

== Titles ==
- LEN Women's Champions' Cup
  - 1994, 1998, 2001, 2002, 2004, 2005, 2006, 2008
- Women's LEN Trophy
  - 2019
- Women's LEN Super Cup
  - 2008, 2019
- Serie A1

Champions (26): 1991–92, 1992–93, 1993–94, 1994–95, 1995–96, 1996–97, 1997–98, 1998–99, 1999–00, 2000–01, 2001–02, 2002–03, 2003–04, 2004–05, 2005–06, 2007–08, 2008–09, 2009–10, 2010–11, 2018–19, 2020–21, 2021–22, 2022–23, 2023–24, 2024–25, 2025–26

- Coppa Italia

Winners (6): 2011–12, 2012–13, 2017–2018, 2020–2021, 2022–23, 2025–26

== See also ==
- National titles won by Sicilian teams
