= Kinef Kirishi =

Russian water polo club

- League: Russian Championship
- Based in: Kirishi
- Colors
- Website: sportkinef.ru

Kinef-Surgutneftegaz (Russian: КИНЕФ-Сургутнефтегаз) is a Russian professional men's and women's water polo club from Kirishi owned by Kinef and Surgutneftegaz.

The women's club was founded in the 1993–94 season as Fakel. In the 1996–97 season the club was renamed Kinef. Since 2003, receiving its current name Kinef-Surgutneftegaz, the Russian club emerged in the mid-2000s as the leading team in Russia, dominating the Russian Championship in subsequent years. Most recently it was won its nineteenth title in a row and qualified for the 2012 European Cup's final four.

== Titles (women's team) ==
- LEN Women's Champions League
  - Champion (2): 2017, 2018
  - Runner up (5): 2005, 2006, 2007, 2010, 2013
- LEN Trophy (1)
  - 2021
- Russian Championship (19)
  - 2003, 2004, 2005, 2006, 2007, 2008, 2009, 2010, 2011, 2012, 2013, 2014, 2015, 2016, 2017, 2018, 2019, 2020, 2021
