= SV Blau-Weiss Bochum =

German water polo and swimming club

Blau-Weiss Bochum
- Founded: 1896
- League: Deutsche Wasserball-Liga
- Based in: Bochum
- Colors
- Championships: 12 German Leagues; 10 German Cups
- Website: http://www.bwb-wasserball.de/joomla/

Schwimmverein Blau-Weiß Bochum von 1896 e.V. is a German water polo and swimming club from Bochum.

Its women's team has dominated the Deutsche Wasserball-Liga throughout the past decade, winning every title since 2000. It is a regular in the European Cup.

== Titles ==
- Wasserball-Liga
  - 2000, 2001, 2002, 2003, 2004, 2005, 2006, 2007, 2008, 2009, 2010, 2011
- Wasserball-Pokal
  - 1996, 2002, 2003, 2004, 2005, 2006, 2008, 2009, 2010, 2011
