= 2025 World Aquatics Women's Water Polo World Cup =

- League: FINA Water Polo World Cup
- Sport: Water polo
- Duration: 14 December 2024 – 20 April 2025

Super Final
- Finals champions: Greece (1st title)
- Runners-up: Hungary

FINA Women's Water Polo World Cup seasons
- ← 2023 2026 →

The 2025 Women's FINA Women's Water Polo World Cup was the 19th edition of the tournament. It ran from 14 December 2024 to 20 April 2025.

Greece won their first title with a win over Hungary.

== Format ==
There were two divisions. In Division 1 eight teams and in Division 2 twelve teams played. The top-six teams of Division 1 and the top-two teams from Division 2 competed in the super final. A win gave a team three points, a win after penalties two, a loss after penalties one and a loss after regular time zero points.

== Division 1 ==
2025 World Aquatics Women's Water Polo World Cup
Tournament details
- Host country: Greece
- Venue: 1
- Dates: 14–19 January
- Teams: 8 (from 3 confederations)

Tournament statistics
- Matches played: 24
- Goals scored: 552 (23 per match)

The draw was held on 31 October 2024. The tournament was played in Alexandroupolis, Greece between 14 and 19 January 2025. The top two of each group made a new group, while the last two teams per group formed a new group. The top six finishers advanced to the super final.

All times are local (UTC+2).

=== Round 1 ===
==== Group A ====
Pos	Team	Pld	W	PW	PL	L	GF	GA	GD	Pts	Qualification
1	Spain	3	2	0	1	0	44	33	+11	7	Round 2
2	Greece (H)	3	2	0	0	1	42	31	+11	6	Round 2
3	Hungary	3	1	1	0	1	36	35	+1	5	
4	United States	3	0	0	0	3	25	48	−23	0	

Updated to match(es) played on 16 January 2025. Source: Worldcupwp2025
Rules for classification: 1) Points; 2) Head-to-head points; 3) Head-to-head goal difference; 4) Head-to-head goals scored; 5) Goal difference.
(H) Host

14 January 2025; 15:00	Report	United States	11–16	Spain	Alexandroupoli Municipal Swimming Pool, Alexandroupolis; Referees: Jakov Blašković (CRO), Nicola Johnson (AUS)
14 January 2025; 15:00	Report	Score by quarters: 1–6, 5–4, 2–3, 3–3			Alexandroupoli Municipal Swimming Pool, Alexandroupolis; Referees: Jakov Blašković (CRO), Nicola Johnson (AUS)
14 January 2025; 15:00	Report	four players 2	Goals	Prats 4	Alexandroupoli Municipal Swimming Pool, Alexandroupolis; Referees: Jakov Blašković (CRO), Nicola Johnson (AUS)

14 January 2025; 19:00	Report	Greece	14–10	Hungary	Alexandroupoli Municipal Swimming Pool, Alexandroupolis; Referees: Natalia Markopoulou (GRE), Nikolett Sajben (HUN)
14 January 2025; 19:00	Report	Score by quarters: 4–2, 3–1, 4–4, 3–3			Alexandroupoli Municipal Swimming Pool, Alexandroupolis; Referees: Natalia Markopoulou (GRE), Nikolett Sajben (HUN)
14 January 2025; 19:00	Report	Myriokefalitaki, Plevritou 4	Goals	Faragó 3	Alexandroupoli Municipal Swimming Pool, Alexandroupolis; Referees: Natalia Markopoulou (GRE), Nikolett Sajben (HUN)

15 January 2025; 15:00	Report	Hungary	12–7	United States	Alexandroupoli Municipal Swimming Pool, Alexandroupolis; Referees: Nicola Johnson (AUS), Frank Ohme (GER)
15 January 2025; 15:00	Report	Score by quarters: 2–1, 5–3, 1–1, 4–2			Alexandroupoli Municipal Swimming Pool, Alexandroupolis; Referees: Nicola Johnson (AUS), Frank Ohme (GER)
15 January 2025; 15:00	Report	Keszthelyi 4	Goals	Dempsey, Flynn 2	Alexandroupoli Municipal Swimming Pool, Alexandroupolis; Referees: Nicola Johnson (AUS), Frank Ohme (GER)

15 January 2025; 19:00	Report	Spain	14–8	Greece	Alexandroupoli Municipal Swimming Pool, Alexandroupolis; Referees: Marieke van den Berg (NED), Matan Schwartz (ISR)
15 January 2025; 19:00	Report	Score by quarters: 4–2, 4–0, 4–3, 2–3			Alexandroupoli Municipal Swimming Pool, Alexandroupolis; Referees: Marieke van den Berg (NED), Matan Schwartz (ISR)
15 January 2025; 19:00	Report	three players 3	Goals	Ninou 3	Alexandroupoli Municipal Swimming Pool, Alexandroupolis; Referees: Marieke van den Berg (NED), Matan Schwartz (ISR)

16 January 2025; 15:00	Report	Spain	17–18 (PSO)	Hungary	Alexandroupoli Municipal Swimming Pool, Alexandroupolis; Referees: Matan Schwartz (ISR), Giuliana Nicolosi (ITA)
16 January 2025; 15:00	Report	Score by quarters: 3–3, 3–4, 4–3, 4–4 PSO: 3–4			Alexandroupoli Municipal Swimming Pool, Alexandroupolis; Referees: Matan Schwartz (ISR), Giuliana Nicolosi (ITA)
16 January 2025; 15:00	Report	Ruiz 6	Goals	Hajdú 5	Alexandroupoli Municipal Swimming Pool, Alexandroupolis; Referees: Matan Schwartz (ISR), Giuliana Nicolosi (ITA)

16 January 2025; 19:00	Report	Greece	20–7	United States	Alexandroupoli Municipal Swimming Pool, Alexandroupolis; Referees: Frank Ohme (GER), Marieke van den Berg (NED)
16 January 2025; 19:00	Report	Score by quarters: 4–2, 4–2, 7–1, 5–2			Alexandroupoli Municipal Swimming Pool, Alexandroupolis; Referees: Frank Ohme (GER), Marieke van den Berg (NED)
16 January 2025; 19:00	Report	Santa 3	Goals	Flynn 2	Alexandroupoli Municipal Swimming Pool, Alexandroupolis; Referees: Frank Ohme (GER), Marieke van den Berg (NED)

==== Group B ====
Pos	Team	Pld	W	PW	PL	L	GF	GA	GD	Pts	Qualification
1	Netherlands	3	3	0	0	0	43	23	+20	9	Round 2
2	Australia	3	2	0	0	1	36	25	+11	6	Round 2
3	Italy	3	1	0	0	2	32	32	0	3	
4	Israel	3	0	0	0	3	21	52	−31	0	

Source: Worldcupwp2025
Rules for classification: 1) Points; 2) Head-to-head points; 3) Head-to-head goal difference; 4) Head-to-head goals scored; 5) Goal difference.

14 January 2025; 17:00	Report	Israel	9–16	Italy	Alexandroupoli Municipal Swimming Pool, Alexandroupolis; Referees: Matan Schwartz (ISR), Giuliana Nicolosi (ITA)
14 January 2025; 17:00	Report	Score by quarters: 2–5, 2–3, 2–4, 3–4			Alexandroupoli Municipal Swimming Pool, Alexandroupolis; Referees: Matan Schwartz (ISR), Giuliana Nicolosi (ITA)
14 January 2025; 17:00	Report	Yaacobi 3	Goals	Cocchiere, Leone 4	Alexandroupoli Municipal Swimming Pool, Alexandroupolis; Referees: Matan Schwartz (ISR), Giuliana Nicolosi (ITA)

14 January 2025; 21:00	Report	Netherlands	11–9	Australia	Alexandroupoli Municipal Swimming Pool, Alexandroupolis; Referees: Danielle Dabbaghian (USA), Frank Ohme (GER)
14 January 2025; 21:00	Report	Score by quarters: 4–1, 1–1, 3–6, 3–1			Alexandroupoli Municipal Swimming Pool, Alexandroupolis; Referees: Danielle Dabbaghian (USA), Frank Ohme (GER)
14 January 2025; 21:00	Report	four players 2	Goals	Williams 4	Alexandroupoli Municipal Swimming Pool, Alexandroupolis; Referees: Danielle Dabbaghian (USA), Frank Ohme (GER)

15 January 2025; 17:00	Report	Italy	8–11	Netherlands	Alexandroupoli Municipal Swimming Pool, Alexandroupolis; Referees: Marta Cabañas (ESP), Jakov Blašković (CRO)
15 January 2025; 17:00	Report	Score by quarters: 2–3, 1–1, 4–1, 1–6			Alexandroupoli Municipal Swimming Pool, Alexandroupolis; Referees: Marta Cabañas (ESP), Jakov Blašković (CRO)
15 January 2025; 17:00	Report	Gant, Ranalli 2	Goals	Van der Weijden 3	Alexandroupoli Municipal Swimming Pool, Alexandroupolis; Referees: Marta Cabañas (ESP), Jakov Blašković (CRO)

15 January 2025; 21:00	Report	Australia	15–6	Israel	Alexandroupoli Municipal Swimming Pool, Alexandroupolis; Referees: Nikolett Sajben (HUN), Danielle Dabbaghian (USA)
15 January 2025; 21:00	Report	Score by quarters: 4–0, 3–1, 4–3, 4–2			Alexandroupoli Municipal Swimming Pool, Alexandroupolis; Referees: Nikolett Sajben (HUN), Danielle Dabbaghian (USA)
15 January 2025; 21:00	Report	C. Andrews 5	Goals	Rahum, Yaacobi 2	Alexandroupoli Municipal Swimming Pool, Alexandroupolis; Referees: Nikolett Sajben (HUN), Danielle Dabbaghian (USA)

16 January 2025; 17:00	Report	Netherlands	21–6	Israel	Alexandroupoli Municipal Swimming Pool, Alexandroupolis; Referees: Danielle Dabbaghian (USA), Marta Cabañas (ESP)
16 January 2025; 17:00	Report	Score by quarters: 5–2, 4–1, 5–1, 7–2			Alexandroupoli Municipal Swimming Pool, Alexandroupolis; Referees: Danielle Dabbaghian (USA), Marta Cabañas (ESP)
16 January 2025; 17:00	Report	Van der Weijden 5	Goals	Markovsky, Yaacobi 2	Alexandroupoli Municipal Swimming Pool, Alexandroupolis; Referees: Danielle Dabbaghian (USA), Marta Cabañas (ESP)

16 January 2025; 21:00	Report	Italy	8–12	Australia	Alexandroupoli Municipal Swimming Pool, Alexandroupolis; Referees: Natalia Markopoulou (GRE), Jakov Blašković (CRO)
16 January 2025; 21:00	Report	Score by quarters: 1–5, 1–2, 3–3, 3–2			Alexandroupoli Municipal Swimming Pool, Alexandroupolis; Referees: Natalia Markopoulou (GRE), Jakov Blašković (CRO)
16 January 2025; 21:00	Report	Ranalli 4	Goals	A. Andrews 5	Alexandroupoli Municipal Swimming Pool, Alexandroupolis; Referees: Natalia Markopoulou (GRE), Jakov Blašković (CRO)

=== Round 2 ===
All teams from Group A advanced to the Super final.

==== Group A ====
Pos	Team	Pld	W	PW	PL	L	GF	GA	GD	Pts
1	Spain	3	3	0	0	0	45	28	+17	9
2	Netherlands	3	2	0	0	1	31	32	−1	6
3	Greece (H)	3	1	0	0	2	31	34	−3	3
4	Australia	3	0	0	0	3	25	38	−13	0

Source: Worldcupwp2025
Rules for classification: 1) Points; 2) Head-to-head points; 3) Head-to-head goal difference; 4) Head-to-head goals scored; 5) Goal difference.
(H) Host

17 January 2025; 19:00	Report	Netherlands	11–10	Greece	Alexandroupoli Municipal Swimming Pool, Alexandroupolis; Referees: Jakov Blašković (CRO), Giuliana Nicolosi (ITA)
17 January 2025; 19:00	Report	Score by quarters: 3–3, 3–1, 4–3, 1–3			Alexandroupoli Municipal Swimming Pool, Alexandroupolis; Referees: Jakov Blašković (CRO), Giuliana Nicolosi (ITA)
17 January 2025; 19:00	Report	Van de Kraats, Van der Sloot 3	Goals	three players 2	Alexandroupoli Municipal Swimming Pool, Alexandroupolis; Referees: Jakov Blašković (CRO), Giuliana Nicolosi (ITA)

17 January 2025; 21:00	Report	Spain	14–11	Australia	Alexandroupoli Municipal Swimming Pool, Alexandroupolis; Referees: Matan Schwartz (ISR), Nikolett Sajben (HUN)
17 January 2025; 21:00	Report	Score by quarters: 3–3, 5–0, 3–7, 3–1			Alexandroupoli Municipal Swimming Pool, Alexandroupolis; Referees: Matan Schwartz (ISR), Nikolett Sajben (HUN)
17 January 2025; 21:00	Report	Leitón 3	Goals	Williams 5	Alexandroupoli Municipal Swimming Pool, Alexandroupolis; Referees: Matan Schwartz (ISR), Nikolett Sajben (HUN)

18 January 2025; 19:00	Report	Greece	12–8	Australia	Alexandroupoli Municipal Swimming Pool, Alexandroupolis; Referees: Matan Schwartz (ISR), Danielle Dabbaghian (USA)
18 January 2025; 19:00	Report	Score by quarters: 3–3, 4–2, 3–2, 2–1			Alexandroupoli Municipal Swimming Pool, Alexandroupolis; Referees: Matan Schwartz (ISR), Danielle Dabbaghian (USA)
18 January 2025; 19:00	Report	Myriokefalitaki, Plevritou 3	Goals	A. Andrews 2	Alexandroupoli Municipal Swimming Pool, Alexandroupolis; Referees: Matan Schwartz (ISR), Danielle Dabbaghian (USA)

18 January 2025; 21:00	Report	Spain	16–8	Netherlands	Alexandroupoli Municipal Swimming Pool, Alexandroupolis; Referees: Giuliana Nicolosi (ITA), Frank Ohme (GER)
18 January 2025; 21:00	Report	Score by quarters: 3–1, 3–4, 4–1, 6–2			Alexandroupoli Municipal Swimming Pool, Alexandroupolis; Referees: Giuliana Nicolosi (ITA), Frank Ohme (GER)
18 January 2025; 21:00	Report	Leitón 3	Goals	three players 2	Alexandroupoli Municipal Swimming Pool, Alexandroupolis; Referees: Giuliana Nicolosi (ITA), Frank Ohme (GER)

19 January 2025; 17:00	Report	Netherlands	12–6	Australia	Alexandroupoli Municipal Swimming Pool, Alexandroupolis; Referees: Matan Schwartz (ISR), Giuliana Nicolosi (ITA)
19 January 2025; 17:00	Report	Score by quarters: 4–3, 2–, 4–1, 2–2			Alexandroupoli Municipal Swimming Pool, Alexandroupolis; Referees: Matan Schwartz (ISR), Giuliana Nicolosi (ITA)
19 January 2025; 17:00	Report	four players 2	Goals	Williams 2	Alexandroupoli Municipal Swimming Pool, Alexandroupolis; Referees: Matan Schwartz (ISR), Giuliana Nicolosi (ITA)

19 January 2025; 19:00	Report	Spain	15–9	Greece	Alexandroupoli Municipal Swimming Pool, Alexandroupolis; Referees: Frank Ohme (GER), Nikolett Sajben (HUN)
19 January 2025; 19:00	Report	Score by quarters: 1–1, 5–3, 4–4, 5–1			Alexandroupoli Municipal Swimming Pool, Alexandroupolis; Referees: Frank Ohme (GER), Nikolett Sajben (HUN)
19 January 2025; 19:00	Report	Ruiz 4	Goals	three players 2	Alexandroupoli Municipal Swimming Pool, Alexandroupolis; Referees: Frank Ohme (GER), Nikolett Sajben (HUN)

==== Group B ====
Pos	Team	Pld	W	PW	PL	L	GF	GA	GD	Pts	Qualification
1	Hungary	3	3	0	0	0	41	27	+14	9	Super final
2	Italy	3	2	0	0	1	42	37	+5	6	Super final
3	United States	3	1	0	0	2	28	32	−4	3	
4	Israel	3	0	0	0	3	30	45	−15	0	

Source: Worldcupwp2025
Rules for classification: 1) Points; 2) Head-to-head points; 3) Head-to-head goal difference; 4) Head-to-head goals scored; 5) Goal difference.

17 January 2025; 15:00	Report	Hungary	18–9	Israel	Alexandroupoli Municipal Swimming Pool, Alexandroupolis; Referees: Marieke van den Berg (NED), Marta Cabañas (ESP)
17 January 2025; 15:00	Report	Score by quarters: 6–4, 5–0, 3–3, 4–2			Alexandroupoli Municipal Swimming Pool, Alexandroupolis; Referees: Marieke van den Berg (NED), Marta Cabañas (ESP)
17 January 2025; 15:00	Report	Dobi 3	Goals	Yaacobi 3	Alexandroupoli Municipal Swimming Pool, Alexandroupolis; Referees: Marieke van den Berg (NED), Marta Cabañas (ESP)

17 January 2025; 17:00	Report	Italy	13–12	United States	Alexandroupoli Municipal Swimming Pool, Alexandroupolis; Referees: Nicola Johnson (AUS), Frank Ohme (GER)
17 January 2025; 17:00	Report	Score by quarters: 3–5, 1–4, 3–3, 6–0			Alexandroupoli Municipal Swimming Pool, Alexandroupolis; Referees: Nicola Johnson (AUS), Frank Ohme (GER)
17 January 2025; 17:00	Report	Bettini 5	Goals	Dempsey 6	Alexandroupoli Municipal Swimming Pool, Alexandroupolis; Referees: Nicola Johnson (AUS), Frank Ohme (GER)

18 January 2025; 15:00	Report	United States	10–9	Israel	Alexandroupoli Municipal Swimming Pool, Alexandroupolis; Referees: Marieke van den Berg (NED), Natalia Markopoulou (GRE)
18 January 2025; 15:00	Report	Score by quarters: 2–1, 1–3, 5–2, 2–3			Alexandroupoli Municipal Swimming Pool, Alexandroupolis; Referees: Marieke van den Berg (NED), Natalia Markopoulou (GRE)
18 January 2025; 15:00	Report	Flynn 3	Goals	Bogachenko 5	Alexandroupoli Municipal Swimming Pool, Alexandroupolis; Referees: Marieke van den Berg (NED), Natalia Markopoulou (GRE)

18 January 2025; 17:00	Report	Hungary	13–12	Italy	Alexandroupoli Municipal Swimming Pool, Alexandroupolis; Referees: Marta Cabañas (ESP), Jakov Blašković (CRO)
18 January 2025; 17:00	Report	Score by quarters: 3–2, 2–4, 6–3, 2–3			Alexandroupoli Municipal Swimming Pool, Alexandroupolis; Referees: Marta Cabañas (ESP), Jakov Blašković (CRO)
18 January 2025; 17:00	Report	Keszthelyi 6	Goals	Bettini 5	Alexandroupoli Municipal Swimming Pool, Alexandroupolis; Referees: Marta Cabañas (ESP), Jakov Blašković (CRO)

19 January 2025; 13:00	Report	Italy	17–12	Israel	Alexandroupoli Municipal Swimming Pool, Alexandroupolis; Referees: Nicola Johnson (AUS), Marta Cabañas (ESP)
19 January 2025; 13:00	Report	Score by quarters: 3–2, 4–5, 6–2, 4–3			Alexandroupoli Municipal Swimming Pool, Alexandroupolis; Referees: Nicola Johnson (AUS), Marta Cabañas (ESP)
19 January 2025; 13:00	Report	Bettini 6	Goals	Bogachenko, Tirosh 3	Alexandroupoli Municipal Swimming Pool, Alexandroupolis; Referees: Nicola Johnson (AUS), Marta Cabañas (ESP)

19 January 2025; 15:00	Report	Hungary	10–6	United States	Alexandroupoli Municipal Swimming Pool, Alexandroupolis; Referees: Natalia Markopoulou (GRE), Jakov Blašković (CRO)
19 January 2025; 15:00	Report	Score by quarters: 2–3, 2–2, 4–0, 2–1			Alexandroupoli Municipal Swimming Pool, Alexandroupolis; Referees: Natalia Markopoulou (GRE), Jakov Blašković (CRO)
19 January 2025; 15:00	Report	Faragó 4	Goals	Flynn 3	Alexandroupoli Municipal Swimming Pool, Alexandroupolis; Referees: Natalia Markopoulou (GRE), Jakov Blašković (CRO)

== Division 2 ==
2025 World Aquatics Women's Water Polo World Cup
Tournament details
- Host country: Turkey
- Venue: 1 (in 1 host city)
- Dates: 14–17 December
- Teams: 12 (from 3 confederations)

Tournament statistics
- Matches played: 28
- Goals scored: 770 (27.5 per match)
- Top scorers: (Turkey) Kübra Kuş (32 goals)

The draw was held on 31 October 2024. The tournament was played in Istanbul, Turkey between 14 and 17 December 2024. The top two of each group advanced to the quarterfinals and the top-two finishers of the tournament will play in the super final.

All times are local (UTC+3).

=== Group A ===
Pos	Team	Pld	W	PW	PL	L	GF	GA	GD	Pts	Qualification
1	Great Britain	2	2	0	0	0	43	12	+31	6	Quarterfinals
2	Turkey (H)	2	1	0	0	1	29	20	+9	3	Quarterfinals
3	Bulgaria (Note: Bulgaria replaced Kazakhstan.)	2	0	0	0	2	10	50	−40	0	

Source: Worldcupwp2025
Rules for classification: 1) Points; 2) Head-to-head points; 3) Head-to-head goal difference; 4) Head-to-head goals scored; 5) Goal difference.
(H) Host
Notes:

14 December 2024; 09:00	Report	Great Britain	29–4	Bulgaria	Maltepe University, Istanbul; Referees: Aurely Blanchard (FRA), Yuriko Udagawa (JPN)
14 December 2024; 09:00	Report	Score by quarters: 7–1, 8–1, 6–0, 8–2			Maltepe University, Istanbul; Referees: Aurely Blanchard (FRA), Yuriko Udagawa (JPN)
14 December 2024; 09:00	Report	Falvey 6	Goals	four players 1	Maltepe University, Istanbul; Referees: Aurely Blanchard (FRA), Yuriko Udagawa (JPN)

14 December 2024; 16:00	Report	Bulgaria	6–21	Turkey	Maltepe University, Istanbul; Referees: Lea Saftić (CRO), Yang Pang (CHN)
14 December 2024; 16:00	Report	Score by quarters: 1–3, 1–7, 2–6, 2–5			Maltepe University, Istanbul; Referees: Lea Saftić (CRO), Yang Pang (CHN)
14 December 2024; 16:00	Report	I. Dimitrova, Naneva 2	Goals	Kuş 9	Maltepe University, Istanbul; Referees: Lea Saftić (CRO), Yang Pang (CHN)

15 December 2024; 10:00	Report	Turkey	8–14	Great Britain	Maltepe University, Istanbul; Referees: Alessia Ferrari (ITA), Lea Saftić (CRO)
15 December 2024; 10:00	Report	Score by quarters: 1–3, 2–1, 4–5, 1–5			Maltepe University, Istanbul; Referees: Alessia Ferrari (ITA), Lea Saftić (CRO)
15 December 2024; 10:00	Report	Kuş 4	Goals	Dickens, Perkins 3	Maltepe University, Istanbul; Referees: Alessia Ferrari (ITA), Lea Saftić (CRO)

=== Group B ===
Pos	Team	Pld	W	PW	PL	L	GF	GA	GD	Pts	Qualification
1	Germany	2	2	0	0	0	48	14	+34	6	Quarterfinals
2	Czech Republic	2	1	0	0	1	21	37	−16	3	Quarterfinals
3	Singapore	2	0	0	0	2	21	39	−18	0	

Source: Worldcupwp2025
Rules for classification: 1) Points; 2) Head-to-head points; 3) Head-to-head goal difference; 4) Head-to-head goals scored; 5) Goal difference.

14 December 2024; 10:30	Report	Czech Republic	6–24	Germany	Maltepe University, Istanbul; Referees: Spyridon Achladiotis (GRE), Matthew Stringer (RSA)
14 December 2024; 10:30	Report	Score by quarters: 1–8, 3–2, 2–9, 0–5			Maltepe University, Istanbul; Referees: Spyridon Achladiotis (GRE), Matthew Stringer (RSA)
14 December 2024; 10:30	Report	J. Holá 4	Goals	G. Deike 7	Maltepe University, Istanbul; Referees: Spyridon Achladiotis (GRE), Matthew Stringer (RSA)

14 December 2024; 17:30	Report	Germany	24–8	Singapore	Maltepe University, Istanbul; Referees: Luis Alves (POR), Yuriko Odagawa (JPN)
14 December 2024; 17:30	Report	Score by quarters: 8–1, 7–5, 5–1, 4–1			Maltepe University, Istanbul; Referees: Luis Alves (POR), Yuriko Odagawa (JPN)
14 December 2024; 17:30	Report	Vosseberg 6	Goals	Yap 4	Maltepe University, Istanbul; Referees: Luis Alves (POR), Yuriko Odagawa (JPN)

15 December 2024; 11:30	Report	Singapore	13–15	Czech Republic	Maltepe University, Istanbul; Referees: Aurely Blanchard (FRA), Luis Alves (POR)
15 December 2024; 11:30	Report	Score by quarters: 0–5, 4–2, 6–6, 3–2			Maltepe University, Istanbul; Referees: Aurely Blanchard (FRA), Luis Alves (POR)
15 December 2024; 11:30	Report	Lee 5	Goals	J. Holá, Votavová 4	Maltepe University, Istanbul; Referees: Aurely Blanchard (FRA), Luis Alves (POR)

=== Group C ===
Pos	Team	Pld	W	PW	PL	L	GF	GA	GD	Pts	Qualification
1	China	2	2	0	0	0	34	18	+16	6	Quarterfinals
2	Japan	2	1	0	0	1	42	19	+23	3	Quarterfinals
3	South Africa	2	0	0	0	2	12	51	−39	0	

Source: Worldcupwp2025
Rules for classification: 1) Points; 2) Head-to-head points; 3) Head-to-head goal difference; 4) Head-to-head goals scored; 5) Goal difference.

14 December 2024; 12:00	Report	China	20–7	South Africa	Maltepe University, Istanbul; Referees: Hendrik Schopp (GER), İlkin Çakmakoğlu (TUR)
14 December 2024; 12:00	Report	Score by quarters: 5–2, 5–0, 5–2, 5–3			Maltepe University, Istanbul; Referees: Hendrik Schopp (GER), İlkin Çakmakoğlu (TUR)
14 December 2024; 12:00	Report	Zhou 4	Goals	Banks 3	Maltepe University, Istanbul; Referees: Hendrik Schopp (GER), İlkin Çakmakoğlu (TUR)

14 December 2024; 19:00	Report	South Africa	5–31	Japan	Maltepe University, Istanbul; Referees: Alessia Ferrari (ITA), Jackie See (SGP)
14 December 2024; 19:00	Report	Score by quarters: 2–9, 1–7, 0–7, 2–8			Maltepe University, Istanbul; Referees: Alessia Ferrari (ITA), Jackie See (SGP)
14 December 2024; 19:00	Report	Banks 2	Goals	Shitara, Ura 5	Maltepe University, Istanbul; Referees: Alessia Ferrari (ITA), Jackie See (SGP)

15 December 2024; 13:00	Report	Japan	11–14	China	Maltepe University, Istanbul; Referees: İlkin Çakmakoğlu (TUR), Karel Dvořáček (CZE)
15 December 2024; 13:00	Report	Score by quarters: 1–6, 3–2, 1–3, 6–3			Maltepe University, Istanbul; Referees: İlkin Çakmakoğlu (TUR), Karel Dvořáček (CZE)
15 December 2024; 13:00	Report	Nishiyama4 3	Goals	Zhou 4	Maltepe University, Istanbul; Referees: İlkin Çakmakoğlu (TUR), Karel Dvořáček (CZE)

=== Group D ===
Pos	Team	Pld	W	PW	PL	L	GF	GA	GD	Pts	Qualification
1	Croatia	2	2	0	0	0	29	20	+9	6	Quarterfinals
2	France	2	1	0	0	1	26	16	+10	3	Quarterfinals
3	Portugal	2	0	0	0	2	13	32	−19	0	

Source: Worldcupwp2025
Rules for classification: 1) Points; 2) Head-to-head points; 3) Head-to-head goal difference; 4) Head-to-head goals scored; 5) Goal difference.

14 December 2024; 13:30	Report	France	15–4	Portugal	Maltepe University, Istanbul; Referees: Alessia Ferrari (ITA), Karel Dvořáček (CZE)
14 December 2024; 13:30	Report	Score by quarters: 4–0, 4–1, 4–1, 3–2			Maltepe University, Istanbul; Referees: Alessia Ferrari (ITA), Karel Dvořáček (CZE)
14 December 2024; 13:30	Report	Vernoux 3	Goals	four players 1	Maltepe University, Istanbul; Referees: Alessia Ferrari (ITA), Karel Dvořáček (CZE)

14 December 2024; 20:30	Report	Portugal	9–17	Croatia	Maltepe University, Istanbul; Referees: Karel Dvořáček (CZE), Michael Jukes (GBR)
14 December 2024; 20:30	Report	Score by quarters: 5–4, 1–7, 1–2, 2–4			Maltepe University, Istanbul; Referees: Karel Dvořáček (CZE), Michael Jukes (GBR)
14 December 2024; 20:30	Report	Lousa 3	Goals	Srhoj 5	Maltepe University, Istanbul; Referees: Karel Dvořáček (CZE), Michael Jukes (GBR)

15 December 2024; 14:30	Report	Croatia	12–11	France	Maltepe University, Istanbul; Referees: Spyridon Achladiotis (GRE), Hendrik Schopp (GER)
15 December 2024; 14:30	Report	Score by quarters: 3–3, 4–3, 2–5, 3–0			Maltepe University, Istanbul; Referees: Spyridon Achladiotis (GRE), Hendrik Schopp (GER)
15 December 2024; 14:30	Report	J. Butić, Rozić 3	Goals	Vernoux 5	Maltepe University, Istanbul; Referees: Spyridon Achladiotis (GRE), Hendrik Schopp (GER)

=== Knockout stage ===
==== Bracket ====
Quarter-finals
16 December
Great Britain	22
Czech Republic	4
16 December
Croatia	18
Japan	26
16 December
Germany	12
Turkey	11
16 December
China	7
France	6

Semi-finals
17 December
Great Britain	12
Japan	15
17 December
Germany	8
China	15

Final
17 December
Japan	17
China	15
Third place
17 December
Great Britain	11
Germany	12

Fifth place bracket

5–8th place semifinals
17 December
Czech Republic	8
Croatia	19
17 December
Turkey	9
France	19

Fifth place
17 December
Croatia	14
France	13
Seventh place
17 December
Czech Republic	13
Turkey	16

Ninth place bracket

9–12th place semifinals
15 December
Bulgaria	16
Singapore	18
15 December
South Africa	13
Portugal	19

Ninth place
16 December
Singapore	8
Portugal	17
Eleventh place
16 December
Bulgaria	4
South Africa	21

==== Quarterfinals ====
16 December 2024; 16:00	Report	Great Britain	22–4	Czech Republic	Maltepe University, Istanbul; Referees: İlkin Çakmakoğlu (TUR), Matthew Stringer (RSA)
16 December 2024; 16:00	Report	Score by quarters: 6–1, 5–2, 5–1, 6–0			Maltepe University, Istanbul; Referees: İlkin Çakmakoğlu (TUR), Matthew Stringer (RSA)
16 December 2024; 16:00	Report	Perkins 5	Goals	Bušauerová, J. Holá 2	Maltepe University, Istanbul; Referees: İlkin Çakmakoğlu (TUR), Matthew Stringer (RSA)

16 December 2024; 17:30	Report	Germany	12–11	Turkey	Maltepe University, Istanbul; Referees: Spyridon Achladiotis (GRE), Yuriko Udagawa (JPN)
16 December 2024; 17:30	Report	Score by quarters: 4–5, 4–3, 2–0, 2–3			Maltepe University, Istanbul; Referees: Spyridon Achladiotis (GRE), Yuriko Udagawa (JPN)
16 December 2024; 17:30	Report	Vosseberg 4	Goals	Kuş 8	Maltepe University, Istanbul; Referees: Spyridon Achladiotis (GRE), Yuriko Udagawa (JPN)

16 December 2024; 19:00	Report	China	7–6	France	Maltepe University, Istanbul; Referees: Lea Saftić (CRO), Michael Jukes (GBR)
16 December 2024; 19:00	Report	Score by quarters: 2–1, 2–1, 2–3, 1–1			Maltepe University, Istanbul; Referees: Lea Saftić (CRO), Michael Jukes (GBR)
16 December 2024; 19:00	Report	Wang 4	Goals	Vernoux 3	Maltepe University, Istanbul; Referees: Lea Saftić (CRO), Michael Jukes (GBR)

16 December 2024; 20:30	Report	Croatia	18–26	Japan	Maltepe University, Istanbul; Referees: Alessia Ferrari (ITA), Luis Alves (POR)
16 December 2024; 20:30	Report	Score by quarters: 5–8, 5–5, 6–6, 2–7			Maltepe University, Istanbul; Referees: Alessia Ferrari (ITA), Luis Alves (POR)
16 December 2024; 20:30	Report	Rozić 4	Goals	Kobayashi 5	Maltepe University, Istanbul; Referees: Alessia Ferrari (ITA), Luis Alves (POR)

==== 9–12th place semifinals ====
15 December 2024; 18:00	Report	Bulgaria	16–18	Singapore	Maltepe University, Istanbul; Referees: Yuriko Udagawa (JPN), Michael Jukes (GBR)
15 December 2024; 18:00	Report	Score by quarters: 2–3, 4–7, 4–4, 6–4			Maltepe University, Istanbul; Referees: Yuriko Udagawa (JPN), Michael Jukes (GBR)
15 December 2024; 18:00	Report	I. Dimitrova 6	Goals	Yap 11	Maltepe University, Istanbul; Referees: Yuriko Udagawa (JPN), Michael Jukes (GBR)

15 December 2024; 19:30	Report	South Africa	13–19	Portugal	Maltepe University, Istanbul; Referees: Aurely Blanchard (FRA), Yang Pang (CHN)
15 December 2024; 19:30	Report	Score by quarters: 4–6, 4–2, 2–5, 3–6			Maltepe University, Istanbul; Referees: Aurely Blanchard (FRA), Yang Pang (CHN)
15 December 2024; 19:30	Report	four players 2	Goals	B. Fernandes 6	Maltepe University, Istanbul; Referees: Aurely Blanchard (FRA), Yang Pang (CHN)

==== 5–8th place semifinals ====
17 December 2024; 09:00	Report	Czech Republic	8–19	Croatia	Maltepe University, Istanbul; Referees: Michael Jukes (GBR), Matthew Stringer (RSA)
17 December 2024; 09:00	Report	Score by quarters: 2–5, 1–5, 2–3, 3–6			Maltepe University, Istanbul; Referees: Michael Jukes (GBR), Matthew Stringer (RSA)
17 December 2024; 09:00	Report	Bušauerová 3	Goals	Alamat, Rozić 4	Maltepe University, Istanbul; Referees: Michael Jukes (GBR), Matthew Stringer (RSA)

17 December 2024; 10:30	Report	Turkey	9–19	France	Maltepe University, Istanbul; Referees: Hendrik Schopp (GER), Yang Pang (CHN)
17 December 2024; 10:30	Report	Score by quarters: 3–7, 4–6, 1–3, 1–3			Maltepe University, Istanbul; Referees: Hendrik Schopp (GER), Yang Pang (CHN)
17 December 2024; 10:30	Report	Buralı 4	Goals	Hardy 4	Maltepe University, Istanbul; Referees: Hendrik Schopp (GER), Yang Pang (CHN)

==== Semifinals ====
17 December 2024; 12:00	Report	Great Britain	12–15	Japan	Maltepe University, Istanbul; Referees: Aurely Blanchard (FRA), İlkin Çakmakoğlu (TUR)
17 December 2024; 12:00	Report	Score by quarters: 2–5, 4–4, 3–2, 3–4			Maltepe University, Istanbul; Referees: Aurely Blanchard (FRA), İlkin Çakmakoğlu (TUR)
17 December 2024; 12:00	Report	Clapperton 3	Goals	Arima 7	Maltepe University, Istanbul; Referees: Aurely Blanchard (FRA), İlkin Çakmakoğlu (TUR)

17 December 2024; 13:30	Report	Germany	8–15	China	Maltepe University, Istanbul; Referees: Alessia Ferrari (ITA), Lea Saftić (CRO)
17 December 2024; 13:30	Report	Score by quarters: 3–2, 2–3, 2–6, 1–4			Maltepe University, Istanbul; Referees: Alessia Ferrari (ITA), Lea Saftić (CRO)
17 December 2024; 13:30	Report	G. Deike 3	Goals	Nong 4	Maltepe University, Istanbul; Referees: Alessia Ferrari (ITA), Lea Saftić (CRO)

==== Eleventh place game ====
16 December 2024; 13:00	Report	Bulgaria	4–21	South Africa	Maltepe University, Istanbul; Referees: Luis Alves (POR), Jackie See (SGP)
16 December 2024; 13:00	Report	Score by quarters: 3–5, 1–4, 0–7, 0–5			Maltepe University, Istanbul; Referees: Luis Alves (POR), Jackie See (SGP)
16 December 2024; 13:00	Report	I. Dimitrova 2	Goals	Banks, January 4	Maltepe University, Istanbul; Referees: Luis Alves (POR), Jackie See (SGP)

==== Ninth place game ====
16 December 2024; 14:30	Report	Singapore	8–17	Portugal	Maltepe University, Istanbul; Referees: Yang Pang (CHN), Karel Dvořáček (CZE)
16 December 2024; 14:30	Report	Score by quarters: 3–3, 2–1, 1–6, 2–7			Maltepe University, Istanbul; Referees: Yang Pang (CHN), Karel Dvořáček (CZE)
16 December 2024; 14:30	Report	Tio, Yap 2	Goals	Lousa 5	Maltepe University, Istanbul; Referees: Yang Pang (CHN), Karel Dvořáček (CZE)

==== Seventh place game ====
17 December 2024; 16:00	Report	Czech Republic	13–16	Turkey	Maltepe University, Istanbul; Referees: Jackie See (SGP), Michael Jukes (GBR)
17 December 2024; 16:00	Report	Score by quarters: 3–2, 2–6, 3–4, 5–4			Maltepe University, Istanbul; Referees: Jackie See (SGP), Michael Jukes (GBR)
17 December 2024; 16:00	Report	J. Holá 7	Goals	Kuş 8	Maltepe University, Istanbul; Referees: Jackie See (SGP), Michael Jukes (GBR)

==== Fifth place game ====
17 December 2024; 17:30	Report	Croatia	14–13	France	Maltepe University, Istanbul; Referees: Karel Dvořáček (CZE), Yuriko Udagawa (JPN)
17 December 2024; 17:30	Report	Score by quarters: 2–4, 5–3, 5–2, 2–4			Maltepe University, Istanbul; Referees: Karel Dvořáček (CZE), Yuriko Udagawa (JPN)
17 December 2024; 17:30	Report	Srhoj 5	Goals	Vernoux 5	Maltepe University, Istanbul; Referees: Karel Dvořáček (CZE), Yuriko Udagawa (JPN)

==== Third place game ====
17 December 2024; 19:00	Report	Great Britain	11–12	Germany	Maltepe University, Istanbul; Referees: Alessia Ferrari (ITA), Spyridon Achladiotis (GRE)
17 December 2024; 19:00	Report	Score by quarters: 3–3, 1–4, 3–1, 4–4			Maltepe University, Istanbul; Referees: Alessia Ferrari (ITA), Spyridon Achladiotis (GRE)
17 December 2024; 19:00	Report	Falvey 3	Goals	G. Deike 4	Maltepe University, Istanbul; Referees: Alessia Ferrari (ITA), Spyridon Achladiotis (GRE)

==== Final ====
17 December 2024; 20:30	Report	Japan	17–15	China	Maltepe University, Istanbul; Referees: Lea Saftić (CRO), Hendrik Schopp (GER)
17 December 2024; 20:30	Report	Score by quarters: 1–6, 4–3, 8–1, 4–5			Maltepe University, Istanbul; Referees: Lea Saftić (CRO), Hendrik Schopp (GER)
17 December 2024; 20:30	Report	Kobayashi 4	Goals	Nong 6	Maltepe University, Istanbul; Referees: Lea Saftić (CRO), Hendrik Schopp (GER)

== Super final ==
2025 World Aquatics Women's Water Polo World Cup
Tournament details
- Venue: 1
- Dates: 18–20 April
- Teams: 8

Final positions
- Champions: Greece (1st title)
- Runners-up: Hungary
- Third place: Netherlands
- Fourth place: Spain

Tournament statistics
- Matches played: 12
- Goals scored: 334 (27.83 per match)
- Top scorers: (Japan) Yumi Arima (13 goals)

The tournament took place between 18 and 20 April 2025 in Chengdu, China.

All times are local (UTC+8).

=== Bracket ===
Quarter-finals
18 April
Netherlands	24
Japan	16
18 April
Greece	19
Italy	14
18 April
Spain	15
China	8
18 April
Australia	10
Hungary	14

Semi-finals
19 April
Netherlands	13
Greece	15
19 April
Spain	8
Hungary	10

Final
20 April
Greece	13
Hungary	9
Third place
20 April
Netherlands	10
Spain	8

Fifth place bracket

5–8th place semifinals
19 April
Japan	17
Italy	26
19 April
China	14
Australia	16

Fifth place
20 April
Italy	10 (3)
Australia (PSO)	10 (4)
Seventh place
20 April
Japan	18
China	17

=== Quarterfinals ===
18 April 2025; 13:30	Report	Netherlands	24–16	Japan	Dong'an Lake Sports Park, Chengdu; Referees: Yang Peng (CHN), Ash Kaesler (AUS)
18 April 2025; 13:30	Report	Score by quarters: 6–5, 7–5, 5–4, 6–2			Dong'an Lake Sports Park, Chengdu; Referees: Yang Peng (CHN), Ash Kaesler (AUS)
18 April 2025; 13:30	Report	three players 3	Goals	Arima 5	Dong'an Lake Sports Park, Chengdu; Referees: Yang Peng (CHN), Ash Kaesler (AUS)

18 April 2025; 15:15	Report	Greece	19–14	Italy	Dong'an Lake Sports Park, Chengdu; Referees: Julien Bourges (FRA), Nóra Debreceni (HUN)
18 April 2025; 15:15	Report	Score by quarters: 4–3, 8–6, 4–4, 3–1			Dong'an Lake Sports Park, Chengdu; Referees: Julien Bourges (FRA), Nóra Debreceni (HUN)
18 April 2025; 15:15	Report	V. Plevritou 5	Goals	Bettini 4	Dong'an Lake Sports Park, Chengdu; Referees: Julien Bourges (FRA), Nóra Debreceni (HUN)

18 April 2025; 18:30	Report	Spain	15–8	China	Dong'an Lake Sports Park, Chengdu; Referees: Ruben Sap (NED), Yuriko Udagawa (JPN)
18 April 2025; 18:30	Report	Score by quarters: 2–1, 4–2, 4–3, 5–2			Dong'an Lake Sports Park, Chengdu; Referees: Ruben Sap (NED), Yuriko Udagawa (JPN)
18 April 2025; 18:30	Report	Leitón 4	Goals	Yan 4	Dong'an Lake Sports Park, Chengdu; Referees: Ruben Sap (NED), Yuriko Udagawa (JPN)

18 April 2025; 20:15	Report	Australia	10–14	Hungary	Dong'an Lake Sports Park, Chengdu; Referees: Jennifer McCall (USA), Alessandro Severo (ITA)
18 April 2025; 20:15	Report	Score by quarters: 2–1, 2–4, 3–5, 3–4			Dong'an Lake Sports Park, Chengdu; Referees: Jennifer McCall (USA), Alessandro Severo (ITA)
18 April 2025; 20:15	Report	A. Andrews 3	Goals	Vályi 4	Dong'an Lake Sports Park, Chengdu; Referees: Jennifer McCall (USA), Alessandro Severo (ITA)

=== 5–8th place semifinals ===
19 April 2025; 14:00	Report	Japan	17–26	Italy	Dong'an Lake Sports Park, Chengdu; Referees: Georgios Kravaritis (GRE), Ruben Sap (NED)
19 April 2025; 14:00	Report	Score by quarters: 4–5, 3–8, 3–4, 7–9			Dong'an Lake Sports Park, Chengdu; Referees: Georgios Kravaritis (GRE), Ruben Sap (NED)
19 April 2025; 14:00	Report	Arima 4	Goals	Giustini 8	Dong'an Lake Sports Park, Chengdu; Referees: Georgios Kravaritis (GRE), Ruben Sap (NED)

19 April 2025; 15:45	Report	China	14–16	Australia	Dong'an Lake Sports Park, Chengdu; Referees: Marta Cabañas (ESP), Nóra Debreceni (HUN)
19 April 2025; 15:45	Report	Score by quarters: 3–5, 6–3, 4–8, 1–0			Dong'an Lake Sports Park, Chengdu; Referees: Marta Cabañas (ESP), Nóra Debreceni (HUN)
19 April 2025; 15:45	Report	Nong 5	Goals	Jackovich 6	Dong'an Lake Sports Park, Chengdu; Referees: Marta Cabañas (ESP), Nóra Debreceni (HUN)

=== Semifinals ===
19 April 2025; 18:30	Report	Netherlands	13–15	Greece	Dong'an Lake Sports Park, Chengdu; Referees: Alessandro Severo (ITA), Jennifer McCall (USA)
19 April 2025; 18:30	Report	Score by quarters: 5–3, 4–3, 2–5, 2–4			Dong'an Lake Sports Park, Chengdu; Referees: Alessandro Severo (ITA), Jennifer McCall (USA)
19 April 2025; 18:30	Report	Joustra 3	Goals	Tricha 4	Dong'an Lake Sports Park, Chengdu; Referees: Alessandro Severo (ITA), Jennifer McCall (USA)

19 April 2025; 20:15	Report	Spain	8–10	Hungary	Dong'an Lake Sports Park, Chengdu; Referees: Julien Bourges (FRA), Ash Kaesler (AUS)
19 April 2025; 20:15	Report	Score by quarters: 1–3, 5–3, 2–2, 0–2			Dong'an Lake Sports Park, Chengdu; Referees: Julien Bourges (FRA), Ash Kaesler (AUS)
19 April 2025; 20:15	Report	four players 2	Goals	Faragó 5	Dong'an Lake Sports Park, Chengdu; Referees: Julien Bourges (FRA), Ash Kaesler (AUS)

=== Seventh place game ===
20 April 2025; 10:00	Report	Japan	18–17	China	Dong'an Lake Sports Park, Chengdu; Referees: Jennifer McCall (USA), Ash Kaesler (AUS)
20 April 2025; 10:00	Report	Score by quarters: 3–6, 4–5, 5–5, 6–1			Dong'an Lake Sports Park, Chengdu; Referees: Jennifer McCall (USA), Ash Kaesler (AUS)
20 April 2025; 10:00	Report	Arima 4	Goals	Yan J. 4	Dong'an Lake Sports Park, Chengdu; Referees: Jennifer McCall (USA), Ash Kaesler (AUS)

=== Fifth place game ===
20 April 2025; 11:45	Report	Italy	10–10; PSO: 3–4	Australia	Dong'an Lake Sports Park, Chengdu; Referees: Yuriko Udagawa (JPN), Yang Pang (CHN)
20 April 2025; 11:45	Report	Score by quarters: 3–5, 2–0, 3–2, 2–3			Dong'an Lake Sports Park, Chengdu; Referees: Yuriko Udagawa (JPN), Yang Pang (CHN)
20 April 2025; 11:45	Report	Bettini 5	Goals	A. Andrews 4	Dong'an Lake Sports Park, Chengdu; Referees: Yuriko Udagawa (JPN), Yang Pang (CHN)

=== Third place game ===
20 April 2025; 14:30	Report	Netherlands	10–8	Spain	Dong'an Lake Sports Park, Chengdu; Referees: Georgios Kravaritis (GRE), Nóra Debreceni (HUN)
20 April 2025; 14:30	Report	Score by quarters: 3–3, 3–1, 2–0, 2–4			Dong'an Lake Sports Park, Chengdu; Referees: Georgios Kravaritis (GRE), Nóra Debreceni (HUN)
20 April 2025; 14:30	Report	three players 2	Goals	Ruiz 2	Dong'an Lake Sports Park, Chengdu; Referees: Georgios Kravaritis (GRE), Nóra Debreceni (HUN)

=== Final ===
20 April 2025; 16:15	Report	Greece	13–9	Hungary	Dong'an Lake Sports Park, Chengdu; Referees: Alessandro Severo (ITA), Marta Cabañas (ESP)
20 April 2025; 16:15	Report	Score by quarters: 5–4, 1–0, 6–3, 1–2			Dong'an Lake Sports Park, Chengdu; Referees: Alessandro Severo (ITA), Marta Cabañas (ESP)
20 April 2025; 16:15	Report	three players 3	Goals	Garda 2	Dong'an Lake Sports Park, Chengdu; Referees: Alessandro Severo (ITA), Marta Cabañas (ESP)

== Final standings ==
Rank	Team
Gold medal	Greece
Silver medal	Hungary
Bronze medal	Netherlands
4	Spain
5	Australia
6	Italy
7	Japan
8	China

2025 Women's FINA Water Polo World Cup

Greece
Second title

Team Roster

Maria Kotsioni, Eleftheria Plevritou (C), Foteini Tricha, Stefania Santa, Athina Dimitra Giannopoulou, Eleni Xenaki, Eirini Ninou, Eleftheria Fountotou. Christina Siouti, Vasiliki Plevritou, Sofia Tornarou, Maria Myriokefalitaki, Alexia Evgenia Tzourka, Dionysia Koureta, Foivi Angelidi
Head coach: Charis Pavlidis

== See also ==
- 2025 World Aquatics Men's Water Polo World Cup
