= Water polo at the 2018 Mediterranean Games – Women's tournament =

Women's water polo at the 2018 Mediterranean Games
Tournament details
- Host country: Spain
- Venue(s): 1 (in 1 host city)
- Dates: 27–30 June 2018
- Teams: 6 (from 1 confederation)

Final positions
- Champions: Spain (1st title)
- Runners-up: Italy
- Third place: Greece
- Fourth place: France

Tournament statistics
- Matches played: 9
- Goals scored: 206 (22.89 per match)

The women's water polo tournament at the 2018 Mediterranean Games was held from 27 to 30 June 2018 at the Campclar Aquatic Center in Tarragona, Spain. This was the first year to include women's teams in the water polo event.

== Participating teams ==
- Greece
- France
- Italy
- Portugal
- Spain (host)
- Turkey

== Preliminary round ==
=== Group A ===
All times are CEST (UTC+2).

| Pos | Team | Pld | W | W+ | L+ | L | GF | GA | GD | Pts | Qualification |
|---|---|---|---|---|---|---|---|---|---|---|---|
| 1 | Spain (H) | 2 | 2 | 0 | 0 | 0 | 36 | 14 | +22 | 6 | Final |
| 2 | Greece | 2 | 1 | 0 | 0 | 1 | 37 | 9 | +28 | 3 | 3rd place game |
| 3 | Portugal | 2 | 0 | 0 | 0 | 2 | 6 | 56 | −50 | 0 | 5th place game |

Source: Tarragona 2018
(H) Host

| 27 June 2018; 11:40 | Report | Spain | 9–8 | Greece | Campclar Aquatic Center, Tarragona, Spain |
| 27 June 2018; 11:40 | Report | Score by quarters: 2–1, 2–2, 2–4, 3–1 | | | Campclar Aquatic Center, Tarragona, Spain |
| 27 June 2018; 11:40 | Report | B. Ortiz 3 | Goals | Xenaki 3 | Campclar Aquatic Center, Tarragona, Spain |

| 28 June 2018; 11:40 | Report | Spain | 27–6 | Portugal | Campclar Aquatic Center, Tarragona, Spain |
| 28 June 2018; 11:40 | Report | Score by quarters: 11–0, 5–1, 4–3, 7–2 | | | Campclar Aquatic Center, Tarragona, Spain |
| 28 June 2018; 11:40 | Report | A. Espar, Leitón 5 | Goals | six players 1 | Campclar Aquatic Center, Tarragona, Spain |

| 29 June 2018; 09:30 | Report | Greece | 29–0 | Portugal | Campclar Aquatic Center, Tarragona, Spain |
| 29 June 2018; 09:30 | Report | Score by quarters: 7–0, 8–0, 7–0, 7–0 | | | Campclar Aquatic Center, Tarragona, Spain |
| 29 June 2018; 09:30 | Report | Chydirioti, Xenaki 4 | Goals | | Campclar Aquatic Center, Tarragona, Spain |

=== Group B ===
All times are CEST (UTC+2).

| Pos | Team | Pld | W | W+ | L+ | L | GF | GA | GD | Pts | Qualification |
|---|---|---|---|---|---|---|---|---|---|---|---|
| 1 | Italy | 2 | 2 | 0 | 0 | 0 | 41 | 6 | +35 | 6 | Final |
| 2 | France | 2 | 1 | 0 | 0 | 1 | 16 | 17 | −1 | 3 | 3rd place game |
| 3 | Turkey | 2 | 0 | 0 | 0 | 2 | 9 | 43 | −34 | 0 | 5th place game |

Source: Tarragona 2018

| 27 June 2018; 09:30 | Report | Italy | 11–3 | France | Campclar Aquatic Center, Tarragona, Spain |
| 27 June 2018; 09:30 | Report | Score by quarters: 3–0, 2–3, 3–0, 3–0 | | | Campclar Aquatic Center, Tarragona, Spain |
| 27 June 2018; 09:30 | Report | Bianconi 4 | Goals | three players 1 | Campclar Aquatic Center, Tarragona, Spain |

| 28 June 2018; 09:30 | Report | Italy | 30–3 | Turkey | Campclar Aquatic Center, Tarragona, Spain |
| 28 June 2018; 09:30 | Report | Score by quarters: 6–1, 8–1, 8–0, 8–1 | | | Campclar Aquatic Center, Tarragona, Spain |
| 28 June 2018; 09:30 | Report | five players 4 | Goals | Kuş 3 | Campclar Aquatic Center, Tarragona, Spain |

| 29 June 2018; 11:40 | Report | France | 13–6 | Turkey | Campclar Aquatic Center, Tarragona, Spain |
| 29 June 2018; 11:40 | Report | Score by quarters: 3–2, 6–0, 1–2, 3–2 | | | Campclar Aquatic Center, Tarragona, Spain |
| 29 June 2018; 11:40 | Report | Paillat 4 | Goals | Kuş 4 | Campclar Aquatic Center, Tarragona, Spain |

== Final round ==
=== 5th place match ===
All times are CEST (UTC+2).

| 30 June 2018; 09:30 | Report | Portugal | 16–8 | Turkey | Campclar Aquatic Center, Tarragona, Spain |
| 30 June 2018; 09:30 | Report | Score by quarters: 4–3, 3–1, 4–2, 5–2 | | | Campclar Aquatic Center, Tarragona, Spain |
| 30 June 2018; 09:30 | Report | Braga 4 | Goals | Kuş 4 | Campclar Aquatic Center, Tarragona, Spain |

=== Bronze medal match ===
All times are CEST (UTC+2).

| 30 June 2018; 17:20 | Report | Greece | 15–5 | France | Campclar Aquatic Center, Tarragona, Spain |
| 30 June 2018; 17:20 | Report | Score by quarters: 6–0, 3–3, 4–1, 2–1 | | | Campclar Aquatic Center, Tarragona, Spain |
| 30 June 2018; 17:20 | Report | Asimaki, Xenaki 3 | Goals | Valverde 3 | Campclar Aquatic Center, Tarragona, Spain |

=== Gold medal match ===
All times are CEST (UTC+2).

| 30 June 2018; 19:30 | Report | Spain | 9–8 | Italy | Campclar Aquatic Center, Tarragona, Spain |
| 30 June 2018; 19:30 | Report | Score by quarters: 2–2, 2–0, 4–3, 1–3 | | | Campclar Aquatic Center, Tarragona, Spain |
| 30 June 2018; 19:30 | Report | A. Espar, Leitón 2 Bach, B. Ortiz, M. Ortiz, Forca, García 1 | Goals | Emmolo 3 Garibotti 2 Bianconni, Tabani, Avegno 1 | Campclar Aquatic Center, Tarragona, Spain |

== Final standings ==
| Rank | Team |
|---|---|
| 1st place, gold medalist(s) | Spain |
| 2nd place, silver medalist(s) | Italy |
| 3rd place, bronze medalist(s) | Greece |
| 4 | France |
| 5 | Portugal |
| 6 | Turkey |
