= Greece women's national water polo team =

Greece
- FINA code: GRE
- Nickname(s): Galanolefki (The Blue-white); Ethniki (The National)
- Association: Hellenic Swimming Federation
- Head coach: Charis Pavlidis
- Asst coach: Grigorios Dedes; Antonios Vlontakis
- Captain: Eleftheria Plevritou

FINA ranking (since 2008)
- Current: 3 (as of 19 January 2026)
- Highest: 3 (2026)

Olympic Games (team statistics)
- Appearances: 3 (first in 2004)
- Best result: (silver) (2004)

World Championship
- Appearances: 15 (first in 1998)
- Best result: (gold) (2011, 2025)

World Cup
- Appearances: 7 (first in 1997)
- Best result: (gold) (2025)

World League
- Appearances: 7 (first in 2004)
- Best result: (gold) (2005)

European Championship
- Appearances: 19 (first in 1989)
- Best result: (silver) (2010, 2012, 2018, 2022)

Europa Cup
- Appearances: 2 (first in 2018)
- Best result: (gold) (2018)

Mediterranean Games
- Appearances: 1 (first in 2018)
- Best result: (bronze) (2018)

Media
- Website: koe.org.gr

The Greece women's national water polo team represents Greece in international women's water polo competitions. Since the mid-1990s, Greece have emerged as one of the leading powers in the world, becoming World Champions after their gold medal win at the 2011 World Championship. 14 years later again in Asia, in Singapore this time they repeated their triumph by beating Hungary in the final of the 2025 World Championship. Greece women's national water polo team is the only team in the nation's sport history to have won gold medals (at least once) in world championships competitions at any olympic team sport.

They have also won the silver medal at the 2004 Summer Olympics, the gold medal at the 2005 World League, 4 silver medals at the 2010, 2012, 2018 European Championships and 2022 European Championships and the gold medal at the 2018 Europa Cup.

== Honours ==
=== Gold medals ===
- World Championship: 2011, 2025
- World League: 2005
- Europa Cup: 2018
- World Cup: 2025

=== Silver medals ===
- Olympic Games: 2004
- European Championship: 2010, 2012, 2018, 2022

=== Bronze medals ===
- World League: 2007, 2010, 2012
- Mediterranean Games: 2018
- European Championship: 2024, 2026

=== Overview ===
| Competition | 1st place, gold medalist(s) | 2nd place, silver medalist(s) | 3rd place, bronze medalist(s) | Total |
|---|---|---|---|---|
| Olympic Games | 0 | 1 | 0 | 1 |
| World Championship | 2 | 0 | 0 | 2 |
| World Cup | 1 | 0 | 0 | 1 |
| World League | 1 | 0 | 3 | 4 |
| European Championship | 0 | 4 | 2 | 6 |
| Europa Cup | 1 | 0 | 0 | 1 |
| Mediterranean Games | 0 | 0 | 1 | 1 |
| Total | 5 | 5 | 6 | 16 |

== Results ==
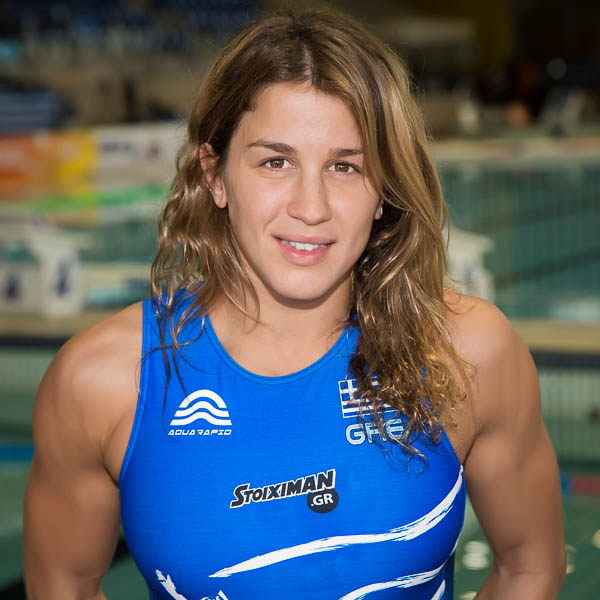
Alexandra Asimaki, 2011 FINA World Player of the Year, led Greece to the 2011 World Championship in Shanghai

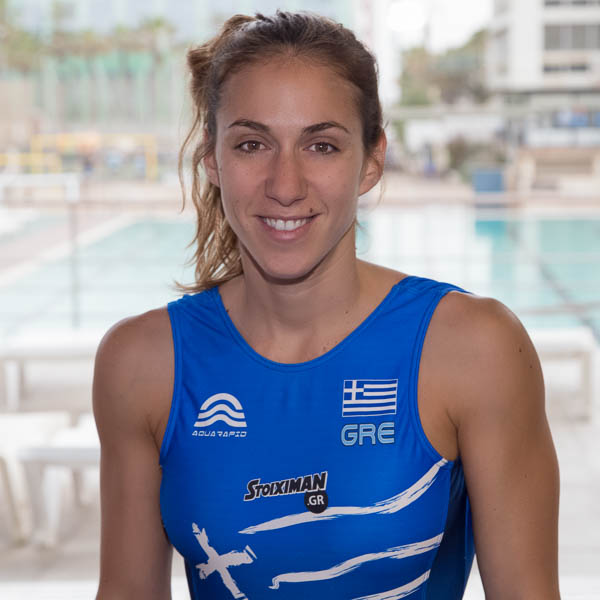
Alkisti Avramidou, prominent member of the Greek team that was crowned World Champion in 2011

=== Olympic Games ===
| Year | Position |
|---|---|
| (United States) 1996 (unofficial competition) | 6th^{[a]} |
| (Greece) 2004 | 2nd place, silver medalist(s) |
| (China) 2008 | 8th |
| (France) 2024 | 7th |
| Total | 3/7 |

=== World Championship ===
| Year | Position |
|---|---|
| (Australia) 1998 | 5th |
| (Japan) 2001 | 7th |
| (Spain) 2003 | 9th |
| (Canada) 2005 | 5th |
| (Australia) 2007 | 8th |
| (Italy) 2009 | 4th |
| (China) 2011 | 1st place, gold medalist(s) |
| (Spain) 2013 | 6th |
| (Russia) 2015 | 6th |
| (Hungary) 2017 | 7th |
| (South Korea) 2019 | 8th |
| (Hungary) 2022 | 7th |
| (Japan) 2023 | 8th |
| (Qatar) 2024 | 4th |
| (Singapore) 2025 | 1st place, gold medalist(s) |
| Total | 15/18 |

=== FINA World Cup ===
| Year | Position |
|---|---|
| (France) 1997 | 6th |
| (Canada) 1999 | 8th |
| (Australia) 2002 | 7th |
| (China) 2006 | 6th |
| (New Zealand) 2010 | 7th |
| (United States) 2023 | 5th |
| (China) 2025 | 1st place, gold medalist(s) |
| (Greece) 2027 | Qualified |
| Total | 8/20 |

=== FINA World League ===
| Year | Position |
|---|---|
| (United States) 2004 | 6th |
| (Russia) 2005 | 1st place, gold medalist(s) |
| (Canada) 2007 | 3rd place, bronze medalist(s) |
| (Russia) 2009 | 7th |
| (United States) 2010 | 3rd place, bronze medalist(s) |
| (China) 2011 | 4th |
| (China) 2012 | 3rd place, bronze medalist(s) |
| (Greece) 2020 | 6th |
| Total | 8/19 |

=== European Championships ===
| Year | Position |
|---|---|
| (West Germany) 1989 | 7th |
| (Greece) 1991 | 7th |
| (United Kingdom) 1993 | 7th |
| (Austria) 1995 | 4th |
| (Spain) 1997 | 7th |
| (Italy) 1999 | 5th |
| (Hungary) 2001 | 4th |
| (Slovenia) 2003 | 5th |
| (Serbia) 2006 | 6th |
| (Spain) 2008 | 6th |
| (Croatia) 2010 | 2nd place, silver medalist(s) |
| (Netherlands) 2012 | 2nd place, silver medalist(s) |
| (Hungary) 2014 | 6th |
| (Serbia) 2016 | 5th |
| (Spain) 2018 | 2nd place, silver medalist(s) |
| (Hungary) 2020 | 6th |
| (Croatia) 2022 | 2nd place, silver medalist(s) |
| (Netherlands) 2024 | 3rd place, bronze medalist(s) |
| (Portugal) 2026 | 3rd place, bronze medalist(s) |
| Total | 19/21 |

=== LEN Europa Cup ===
| Year | Position |
|---|---|
| (Spain) 2018 | 1st place, gold medalist(s) |
| (Italy) 2019 | 6th |

=== Mediterranean Games ===
| Year | Position |
|---|---|
| (Spain) 2018 | 3rd place, bronze medalist(s) |

Note

a. The women had to wait for Olympic recognition by the IOC, and played their own "Olympic Tournament" with twelve competing teams, from 29 May to 7 June 1996 in Emmen, Netherlands.

== Team ==
Roster for the 2026 European Championship.

Head coach: Charis Pavlidis

- 1 Ioanna Stamatopoulou GK
- 2 Eleftheria Plevritou CF
- 3 Foteini Tricha CF
- 4 Eleni Grigoropoulou W
- 5 Eleftheria Fountotou CF
- 6 Eleni Xenaki W
- 7 Eirini Ninou CF
- 8 Maria Patra D
- 9 Christina Siouti D
- 10 Vasiliki Plevritou CF
- 11 Sofia Tornarou D
- 12 Maria Myriokefalitaki CF
- 13 Evangelia Karytsa GK
- 14 Afroditi Bitsakou CF
- 15 Androniki Karagianni CF

=== Past squads ===
- 2004 Olympic Games – Silver Medal

- Georgia Ellinaki, Dimitra Asilian, Antiopi Melidoni, Angeliki Karapataki, Kyriaki Liosi, Stavroula Kozompoli, Aikaterini Oikonomopoulou, Antigoni Roumpesi, Evangelia Moraitidou, Eftychia Karagianni, Georgia Lara, Antonia Moraiti, Anthoula Mylonaki. Head Coach: Kyriakos Iosifidis

- 2005 FINA World League – Gold Medal

- Georgia Ellinaki, Vasileia Mavrelou, Kelina Kantzou, Sofia Iosifidou, Kyriaki Liosi, Stavroula Kozompoli, Aikaterini Oikonomopoulou, Antigoni Roumpesi, Evangelia Moraitidou, Eftychia Karagianni, Alexandra Asimaki, Georgia Lara, Maria Tsouri. Head Coach: Kyriakos Iosifidis

- 2010 European Championship – Silver Medal

- Maria Tsouri, Christina Tsoukala, Antiopi Melidoni, Ilektra Psouni, Kyriaki Liosi, Alkisti Avramidou, Alexandra Asimaki, Antigoni Roumpesi, Angeliki Gerolymou, Triantafyllia Manolioudaki, Stavroula Antonakou, Georgia Lara, Eleni Kouvdou. Head Coach: Giorgos Morfesis

- 2011 World Championship – Gold Medal

- Eleni Kouvdou, Christina Tsoukala, Antiopi Melidoni, Ilektra Psouni, Kyriaki Liosi, Alkisti Avramidou, Alexandra Asimaki, Antigoni Roumpesi, Angeliki Gerolymou, Triantafyllia Manolioudaki, Stavroula Antonakou, Georgia Lara, Eleni Goula. Head Coach: Giorgos Morfesis

- 2012 European Championship – Silver Medal

- Eleni Kouvdou, Christina Tsoukala, Antiopi Melidoni, Ilektra Psouni, Kyriaki Liosi, Alkisti Avramidou, Alexandra Asimaki, Antigoni Roumpesi, Angeliki Gerolymou, Triantafyllia Manolioudaki, Stavroula Antonakou, Georgia Lara, Chrysi Diamantopoulou. Head Coach: Giorgos Morfesis

- 2018 Europa Cup – Gold Medal

- Eleni Kouvdou, Christina Tsoukala, Vasiliki Diamantopoulou, Nikoleta Eleftheriadou, Margarita Plevritou, Alkisti Avramidou, Alexandra Asimaki, Ioanna Chydirioti, Maria Patra, Anastasia Kalargirou, Eleftheria Plevritou, Eleni Xenaki, Chrysi Diamantopoulou. Head Coach: Giorgos Morfesis

- 2018 European Championship – Silver Medal

- Chrysi Diamantopoulou, Christina Tsoukala, Vasiliki Diamantopoulou, Nikoleta Eleftheriadou, Margarita Plevritou, Alkisti Avramidou, Alexandra Asimaki, Ioanna Chydirioti, Maria Patra, Elisavet Protopapas, Eleftheria Plevritou, Eleni Xenaki, Ioanna Stamatopoulou. Head Coach: Giorgos Morfesis

- 2022 European Championship – Silver Medal

- Ioanna Stamatopoulou, Eleftheria Plevritou, Ioanna Chydirioti, Eleni Elliniadi, Margarita Plevritou, Eleni Xenaki, Eirini Ninou, Maria Patra, Foteini Tricha, Vasiliki Plevritou, Athina‑Dimitra Giannopoulou, Maria Myriokefalitaki, Stefania Santa, Christina Siouti, Eleni Sotireli, Alexandra Asimaki. Head Coach: Alexia Kammenou

- 2025 World Cup – Gold Medal

- Maria Kotsioni, Eleftheria Plevritou (C), Foteini Tricha, Stefania Santa, Athina‑Dimitra Giannopoulou, Eleni Xenaki, Eirini Ninou, Eleftheria Fountotou. Christina Siouti, Vasiliki Plevritou, Sofia Tornarou, Maria Myriokefalitaki, Alexia Evgenia Tzourka, Dionysia Koureta, Foivi Angelidi. Head coach: Charis Pavlidis

- 2025 World Championship – Gold Medal

- Ioanna Stamatopoulou, Eleftheria Plevritou, Foteini Tricha, Stefania Santa, Athina‑Dimitra Giannopoulou, Eleni Xenaki, Eirini Ninou, Maria Patra, Christina Siouti, Vasiliki Plevritou, Sofia Tornarou, Maria Myriokefalitaki, Alexia Evgenia Tzourka, Dionysia Koureta, Nefeli Anna Krassa. Head coach: Charis Pavlidis

== Under-20 team ==
Greece lastly competed at the 2021 FINA Junior Water Polo World Championships where they won the silver medal.

== See also ==
- Greece women's Olympic water polo team records and statistics
- Greece men's national water polo team
- List of world champions in women's water polo
