= 2022 Women's European Water Polo Championship =

Tournament details
- Host country: Croatia
- Venue: 1 (in 1 host city)
- Dates: 27 August – 10 September
- Teams: 12 (from 1 confederation)

Final positions
- Champions: Spain (3rd title)
- Runners-up: Greece
- Third place: Italy
- Fourth place: Netherlands

Tournament statistics
- Matches played: 44
- Goals scored: 1,035 (23.52 per match)
- Top scorers: (Hungary) Gréta Gurisatti (27 goals)

Awards
- Best player: (Greece) Eleftheria Plevritou

The 2022 Women's European Water Polo Championship was the 19th running of the tournament. It was held in the Spaladium Arena in Split, Croatia from 27 August to 10 September 2022.

Spain won their third title by defeating Greece in the final, while Italy captured the bronze medal with a win over the Netherlands.

== Venues ==
LEN announced on 28 August 2020 that Split, Croatia would host the 2022 edition of the competition. All games were played at the Spaladium Arena.

Split	2022 Women's European Water Polo Championship (Europe)
Spaladium Arena	2022 Women's European Water Polo Championship (Europe)
Capacity: 9,000	2022 Women's European Water Polo Championship (Europe)
Spaladium Arena 1	2022 Women's European Water Polo Championship (Europe)

== Qualification ==
Twelve teams were able to compete at the main event. They were broken up as follows:

- The host nation
- The top five teams from the 2020 European Championship not already qualified as host nation
- Final six from the qualifiers.

Event	Date	Location	Quotas	Nation(s)
Host	28 August 2020	–	1	Croatia
2020 European Championship	12–25 January 2020	(Hungary) Budapest	5	Hungary; Italy; Netherlands; ~~Russia~~; Spain
Qualifiers	17 February – 6 March 2022	Various	6	France; Germany; Greece; Israel; Romania; Serbia
Wild card	10 April 2022		1	Slovakia

Russia was excluded due to the 2022 Russian invasion of Ukraine.

== Format ==
The twelve teams were split in two groups with six teams each. From there on, a knockout system was used. The first four teams of each group played each other in the quarterfinals in cross group format, the remaining teams played for places nine to twelve.

== Draw ==
The draw was held in Budapest on 23 April 2022.

Pot 1	Pot 2	Pot 3	Pot 4	Pot 5
Spain	Hungary; Netherlands	Italy	Germany; Greece; Israel; Slovakia; Croatia	Romania; Serbia; France

== Preliminary round ==
All times are local (UTC+2).

=== Group A ===
Pos	Team	Pld	W	D	L	GF	GA	GD	Pts	Qualification
1	Netherlands	5	5	0	0	105	21	+84	15	Quarterfinals
2	Greece	5	4	0	1	78	31	+47	12	Quarterfinals
3	Hungary	5	3	0	2	82	32	+50	9	Quarterfinals
4	Croatia (H)	5	2	0	3	46	82	−36	6	Quarterfinals
5	Germany	5	1	0	4	33	93	−60	3	
6	Romania	5	0	0	5	19	104	−85	0	

Source: Split2022
Rules for classification: 1) points; 2) head-to-head points; 3) head-to-head goal difference; 4) head-to-head number of goals scored; 5) Goal difference.
(H) Hosts

27 August 2022; 10:00	Report	Germany	15–10	Romania	Spaladium Arena, Split; Referees: Aurély Blanchard (FRA), Martina Kuníková (SVK)
27 August 2022; 10:00	Report	Score by quarters: 2–1, 3–4, 4–4, 6–1			Spaladium Arena, Split; Referees: Aurély Blanchard (FRA), Martina Kuníková (SVK)
27 August 2022; 10:00	Report	Vosseberg 7	Goals	Melnychuk 4	Spaladium Arena, Split; Referees: Aurély Blanchard (FRA), Martina Kuníková (SVK)

27 August 2022; 17:30	Report	Croatia	6–22	Netherlands	Spaladium Arena, Split; Referees: Ivanka Raković (SRB), Marta Cabañas (ESP)
27 August 2022; 17:30	Report	Score by quarters: 0–7, 3–7, 1–5, 2–3			Spaladium Arena, Split; Referees: Ivanka Raković (SRB), Marta Cabañas (ESP)
27 August 2022; 17:30	Report	J. Butić, Rožić 2	Goals	Joustra, Van der Sloot 4	Spaladium Arena, Split; Referees: Ivanka Raković (SRB), Marta Cabañas (ESP)

27 August 2022; 20:30	Report	Hungary	8–9	Greece	Spaladium Arena, Split; Referees: Ursula Wengenroth (SUI), Alessia Ferrari (ITA)
27 August 2022; 20:30	Report	Score by quarters: 1–3, 2–2, 1–1, 4–3			Spaladium Arena, Split; Referees: Ursula Wengenroth (SUI), Alessia Ferrari (ITA)
27 August 2022; 20:30	Report	Gurisatti 3	Goals	four players 2	Spaladium Arena, Split; Referees: Ursula Wengenroth (SUI), Alessia Ferrari (ITA)

28 August 2022; 13:00	Report	Romania	3–24	Greece	Spaladium Arena, Split; Referees: Ivanka Raković (SRB), Aurély Blanchard (FRA)
28 August 2022; 13:00	Report	Score by quarters: 1–8, 0–4, 0–8, 2–4			Spaladium Arena, Split; Referees: Ivanka Raković (SRB), Aurély Blanchard (FRA)
28 August 2022; 13:00	Report	Olteanu 2	Goals	Myriokefalitaki 6	Spaladium Arena, Split; Referees: Ivanka Raković (SRB), Aurély Blanchard (FRA)

28 August 2022; 17:30	Report	Germany	8–15	Croatia	Spaladium Arena, Split; Referees: Marta Cabañas (ESP), Alessia Ferrari (ITA)
28 August 2022; 17:30	Report	Score by quarters: 2–5, 1–4, 4–3, 1–3			Spaladium Arena, Split; Referees: Marta Cabañas (ESP), Alessia Ferrari (ITA)
28 August 2022; 17:30	Report	three players 2	Goals	Miljković 6	Spaladium Arena, Split; Referees: Marta Cabañas (ESP), Alessia Ferrari (ITA)

28 August 2022; 19:00	Report	Netherlands	13–4	Hungary	Spaladium Arena, Split; Referees: Boris Margeta (SLO), Matan Schwartz (ISR)
28 August 2022; 19:00	Report	Score by quarters: 3–1, 3–2, 4–0, 3–1			Spaladium Arena, Split; Referees: Boris Margeta (SLO), Matan Schwartz (ISR)
28 August 2022; 19:00	Report	three players 3	Goals	four players 1	Spaladium Arena, Split; Referees: Boris Margeta (SLO), Matan Schwartz (ISR)

30 August 2022; 11:30	Report	Hungary	26–4	Germany	Spaladium Arena, Split; Referees: Ivanka Raković (SRB), Martina Kuníková (SVK)
30 August 2022; 11:30	Report	Score by quarters: 7–1, 10–0, 3–1, 6–2			Spaladium Arena, Split; Referees: Ivanka Raković (SRB), Martina Kuníková (SVK)
30 August 2022; 11:30	Report	Gurisatti 5	Goals	Vosseberg 2	Spaladium Arena, Split; Referees: Ivanka Raković (SRB), Martina Kuníková (SVK)

30 August 2022; 17:30	Report	Croatia	15–6	Romania	Spaladium Arena, Split; Referees: Aurély Blanchard (FRA), Alessia Ferrari (ITA)
30 August 2022; 17:30	Report	Score by quarters: 4–1, 4–1, 5–3, 2–1			Spaladium Arena, Split; Referees: Aurély Blanchard (FRA), Alessia Ferrari (ITA)
30 August 2022; 17:30	Report	Skelin 4	Goals	Melnychuk 4	Spaladium Arena, Split; Referees: Aurély Blanchard (FRA), Alessia Ferrari (ITA)

30 August 2022; 20:30	Report	Greece	8–13	Netherlands	Spaladium Arena, Split; Referees: Marta Cabañas (ESP), Boris Margeta (SLO)
30 August 2022; 20:30	Report	Score by quarters: 2–1, 3–5, 3–4, 0–3			Spaladium Arena, Split; Referees: Marta Cabañas (ESP), Boris Margeta (SLO)
30 August 2022; 20:30	Report	four players 2	Goals	Moolhuijzen, Sleeking 3	Spaladium Arena, Split; Referees: Marta Cabañas (ESP), Boris Margeta (SLO)

1 September 2022; 10:00	Report	Germany	3–13	Greece	Spaladium Arena, Split; Referees: Marta Cabañas (ESP), Ursula Wengenroth (GER)
1 September 2022; 10:00	Report	Score by quarters: 0–2, 3–6, 0–3, 0–2			Spaladium Arena, Split; Referees: Marta Cabañas (ESP), Ursula Wengenroth (GER)
1 September 2022; 10:00	Report	three players 1	Goals	Myriokefalitaki 4	Spaladium Arena, Split; Referees: Marta Cabañas (ESP), Ursula Wengenroth (GER)

1 September 2022; 13:00	Report	Romania	0–28	Netherlands	Spaladium Arena, Split; Referees: Aurély Blanchard (FRA), Martina Kuníková (SVK)
1 September 2022; 13:00	Report	Score by quarters: 0–8, 0–7, 0–6, 0–7			Spaladium Arena, Split; Referees: Aurély Blanchard (FRA), Martina Kuníková (SVK)
1 September 2022; 13:00	Report		Goals	Van de Kraats 8	Spaladium Arena, Split; Referees: Aurély Blanchard (FRA), Martina Kuníková (SVK)

1 September 2022; 17:30	Report	Croatia	6–22	Hungary	Spaladium Arena, Split; Referees: Alessia Ferrari (ITA), Ivanka Raković (SRB)
1 September 2022; 17:30	Report	Score by quarters: 3–5, 2–4, 1–7, 0–6			Spaladium Arena, Split; Referees: Alessia Ferrari (ITA), Ivanka Raković (SRB)
1 September 2022; 17:30	Report	I. Butić, Rozić 2	Goals	Gurisatti 5	Spaladium Arena, Split; Referees: Alessia Ferrari (ITA), Ivanka Raković (SRB)

3 September 2022; 10:00	Report	Hungary	22–0	Romania	Spaladium Arena, Split; Referees: Ursula Wengenroth (SUI), Martina Kuníková (SVK)
3 September 2022; 10:00	Report	Score by quarters: 7–0, 4–0, 6–0, 5–0			Spaladium Arena, Split; Referees: Ursula Wengenroth (SUI), Martina Kuníková (SVK)
3 September 2022; 10:00	Report	Gurisatti 5	Goals		Spaladium Arena, Split; Referees: Ursula Wengenroth (SUI), Martina Kuníková (SVK)

3 September 2022; 17:30	Report	Greece	24–4	Croatia	Spaladium Arena, Split; Referees: Aurély Blanchard (FRA), Peter Balzan (MLT)
3 September 2022; 17:30	Report	Score by quarters: 9–2, 5–2, 5–0, 5–0			Spaladium Arena, Split; Referees: Aurély Blanchard (FRA), Peter Balzan (MLT)
3 September 2022; 17:30	Report	Xenaki 4	Goals	Brnetić 2	Spaladium Arena, Split; Referees: Aurély Blanchard (FRA), Peter Balzan (MLT)

3 September 2022; 20:30	Report	Germany	3–29	Netherlands	Spaladium Arena, Split; Referees: Ivanka Raković (SRB), Robert Horvath (SVK)
3 September 2022; 20:30	Report	Score by quarters: 0–9, 1–7, 0–7, 2–6			Spaladium Arena, Split; Referees: Ivanka Raković (SRB), Robert Horvath (SVK)
3 September 2022; 20:30	Report	three players 3	Goals	Joustra 5	Spaladium Arena, Split; Referees: Ivanka Raković (SRB), Robert Horvath (SVK)

=== Group B ===
Pos	Team	Pld	W	D	L	GF	GA	GD	Pts	Qualification
1	Italy	5	5	0	0	98	28	+70	15	Quarterfinals
2	Spain	5	4	0	1	103	25	+78	12	Quarterfinals
3	Israel	5	3	0	2	49	56	−7	9	Quarterfinals
4	France	5	2	0	3	60	62	−2	6	Quarterfinals
5	Serbia	5	1	0	4	37	91	−54	3	
6	Slovakia	5	0	0	5	22	107	−85	0	

Source: Split2022
Rules for classification: 1) points; 2) head-to-head points; 3) head-to-head goal difference; 4) head-to-head number of goals scored; 5) Goal difference.

27 August 2022; 11:30	Report	Serbia	3–32	Spain	Spaladium Arena, Split; Referees: Maria Daskalopoulou (GRE), Erkan Turkkan (TUR)
27 August 2022; 11:30	Report	Score by quarters: 1–6, 2–8, 0–8, 0–10			Spaladium Arena, Split; Referees: Maria Daskalopoulou (GRE), Erkan Turkkan (TUR)
27 August 2022; 11:30	Report	Mandić 2	Goals	González 5	Spaladium Arena, Split; Referees: Maria Daskalopoulou (GRE), Erkan Turkkan (TUR)

27 August 2022; 13:00	Report	Slovakia	1–26	Italy	Spaladium Arena, Split; Referees: Diana Dutilh-Dumas (NED), Radosław Koryzna (POL)
27 August 2022; 13:00	Report	Score by quarters: 1–6, 0–8, 0–4, 0–8			Spaladium Arena, Split; Referees: Diana Dutilh-Dumas (NED), Radosław Koryzna (POL)
27 August 2022; 13:00	Report	Kováčiková 1	Goals	Palmieri 5	Spaladium Arena, Split; Referees: Diana Dutilh-Dumas (NED), Radosław Koryzna (POL)

27 August 2022; 19:00	Report	France	7–8	Israel	Spaladium Arena, Split; Referees: Nóra Debreceni (HUN), Nenad Periš (CRO)
27 August 2022; 19:00	Report	Score by quarters: 3–2, 2–2, 0–4, 2–0			Spaladium Arena, Split; Referees: Nóra Debreceni (HUN), Nenad Periš (CRO)
27 August 2022; 19:00	Report	Daule 3	Goals	Yaacobi 4	Spaladium Arena, Split; Referees: Nóra Debreceni (HUN), Nenad Periš (CRO)

28 August 2022; 10:00	Report	Serbia	14–15	France	Spaladium Arena, Split; Referees: Diana Dutilh-Dumas (NED), Radosław Koryzna (POL)
28 August 2022; 10:00	Report	Score by quarters: 4–3, 2–5, 5–2, 3–5			Spaladium Arena, Split; Referees: Diana Dutilh-Dumas (NED), Radosław Koryzna (POL)
28 August 2022; 10:00	Report	Avdić, Vuković 3	Goals	Millot 5	Spaladium Arena, Split; Referees: Diana Dutilh-Dumas (NED), Radosław Koryzna (POL)

28 August 2022; 11:30	Report	Israel	18–7	Slovakia	Spaladium Arena, Split; Referees: Ursula Wengenroth (SUI), Eurico Silva (POR)
28 August 2022; 11:30	Report	Score by quarters: 5–2, 2–1, 7–1, 4–3			Spaladium Arena, Split; Referees: Ursula Wengenroth (SUI), Eurico Silva (POR)
28 August 2022; 11:30	Report	Sasover, Strugo 4	Goals	three players 2	Spaladium Arena, Split; Referees: Ursula Wengenroth (SUI), Eurico Silva (POR)

28 August 2022; 20:30	Report	Spain	9–12	Italy	Spaladium Arena, Split; Referees: Nóra Debreceni (HUN), Maria Daskalopoulou (GRE)
28 August 2022; 20:30	Report	Score by quarters: 3–2, 2–5, 1–4, 3–1			Spaladium Arena, Split; Referees: Nóra Debreceni (HUN), Maria Daskalopoulou (GRE)
28 August 2022; 20:30	Report	Ortiz 4	Goals	Tabani 3	Spaladium Arena, Split; Referees: Nóra Debreceni (HUN), Maria Daskalopoulou (GRE)

30 August 2022; 10:00	Report	Slovakia	6–9	Serbia	Spaladium Arena, Split; Referees: Adrian Alexandrescu (ROU), Eurico Silva (POR)
30 August 2022; 10:00	Report	Score by quarters: 1–3, 1–2, 3–2, 1–2			Spaladium Arena, Split; Referees: Adrian Alexandrescu (ROU), Eurico Silva (POR)
30 August 2022; 10:00	Report	Kačková 3	Goals	Ilić 3	Spaladium Arena, Split; Referees: Adrian Alexandrescu (ROU), Eurico Silva (POR)

30 August 2022; 13:00	Report	France	4–16	Spain	Spaladium Arena, Split; Referees: Stanko Ivanovski (MNE), Irakli Sanadze (GEO)
30 August 2022; 13:00	Report	Score by quarters: 3–2, 0–7, 1–4, 0–3			Spaladium Arena, Split; Referees: Stanko Ivanovski (MNE), Irakli Sanadze (GEO)
30 August 2022; 13:00	Report	Vernoux 2	Goals	García 4	Spaladium Arena, Split; Referees: Stanko Ivanovski (MNE), Irakli Sanadze (GEO)

30 August 2022; 19:00	Report	Italy	18–5	Israel	Spaladium Arena, Split; Referees: Diana Dutilh-Dumas (NED), Ursula Wengenroth (SUI)
30 August 2022; 19:00	Report	Score by quarters: 4–2, 6–2, 6–0, 2–1			Spaladium Arena, Split; Referees: Diana Dutilh-Dumas (NED), Ursula Wengenroth (SUI)
30 August 2022; 19:00	Report	Palmieri 4	Goals	Bogachenko 3	Spaladium Arena, Split; Referees: Diana Dutilh-Dumas (NED), Ursula Wengenroth (SUI)

1 September 2022; 11:30	Report	Serbia	7–23	Italy	Spaladium Arena, Split; Referees: Maria Daskalopoulou (GRE), Eurico Silva (POR)
1 September 2022; 11:30	Report	Score by quarters: 1–5, 1–5, 3–7, 2–6			Spaladium Arena, Split; Referees: Maria Daskalopoulou (GRE), Eurico Silva (POR)
1 September 2022; 11:30	Report	Milićević 3	Goals	Bettini 4	Spaladium Arena, Split; Referees: Maria Daskalopoulou (GRE), Eurico Silva (POR)

1 September 2022; 19:00	Report	Spain	20–3	Israel	Spaladium Arena, Split; Referees: Diana Dutilh-Dumas (NED), Erkan Turkkan (TUR)
1 September 2022; 19:00	Report	Score by quarters: 5–2, 6–1, 3–0, 6–0			Spaladium Arena, Split; Referees: Diana Dutilh-Dumas (NED), Erkan Turkkan (TUR)
1 September 2022; 19:00	Report	Espar 5	Goals	three players 1	Spaladium Arena, Split; Referees: Diana Dutilh-Dumas (NED), Erkan Turkkan (TUR)

1 September 2022; 20:30	Report	France	28–5	Slovakia	Spaladium Arena, Split; Referees: Nóra Debreceni (HUN), Irakli Sanadze (GEO)
1 September 2022; 20:30	Report	Score by quarters: 8–0, 7–1, 6–2, 7–2			Spaladium Arena, Split; Referees: Nóra Debreceni (HUN), Irakli Sanadze (GEO)
1 September 2022; 20:30	Report	Vernoux 7	Goals	Šepeľová 3	Spaladium Arena, Split; Referees: Nóra Debreceni (HUN), Irakli Sanadze (GEO)

3 September 2022; 11:30	Report	Slovakia	3–26	Spain	Spaladium Arena, Split; Referees: Diana Dutilh-Dumas (NED), Maria Daskalopoulou (GRE)
3 September 2022; 11:30	Report	Score by quarters: 0–8, 1–7, 0–5, 2–6			Spaladium Arena, Split; Referees: Diana Dutilh-Dumas (NED), Maria Daskalopoulou (GRE)
3 September 2022; 11:30	Report	Kováčiková 2	Goals	García 6	Spaladium Arena, Split; Referees: Diana Dutilh-Dumas (NED), Maria Daskalopoulou (GRE)

3 September 2022; 13:00	Report	Serbia	4–15	Israel	Spaladium Arena, Split; Referees: Nóra Debreceni (HUN), Adrian Alexandrescu (ROU)
3 September 2022; 13:00	Report	Score by quarters: 0–5, 2–3, 2–2, 0–5			Spaladium Arena, Split; Referees: Nóra Debreceni (HUN), Adrian Alexandrescu (ROU)
3 September 2022; 13:00	Report	Milićević 2	Goals	Kordonskaia 4	Spaladium Arena, Split; Referees: Nóra Debreceni (HUN), Adrian Alexandrescu (ROU)

3 September 2022; 19:00	Report	Italy	19–6	France	Spaladium Arena, Split; Referees: Marta Cabañas (ESP), Eurico Silva (POR)
3 September 2022; 19:00	Report	Score by quarters: 5–0, 5–3, 4–0, 5–3			Spaladium Arena, Split; Referees: Marta Cabañas (ESP), Eurico Silva (POR)
3 September 2022; 19:00	Report	three players 3	Goals	Guillet, Vernoux 2	Spaladium Arena, Split; Referees: Marta Cabañas (ESP), Eurico Silva (POR)

== Placement games ==
=== Eleventh place game ===
5 September 2022; 10:00	Report	Romania	9–5	Slovakia	Spaladium Arena, Split; Referees: Ivanka Raković (SRB), Radosław Koryzna (POL)
5 September 2022; 10:00	Report	Score by quarters: 3–2, 1–0, 2–2, 3–1			Spaladium Arena, Split; Referees: Ivanka Raković (SRB), Radosław Koryzna (POL)
5 September 2022; 10:00	Report	Szeghalmi 5	Goals	Sedláková 2	Spaladium Arena, Split; Referees: Ivanka Raković (SRB), Radosław Koryzna (POL)

=== Ninth place game ===
5 September 2022; 11:30	Report	Germany	9–12	Serbia	Spaladium Arena, Split; Referees: Maria Daskalopoulou (GRE), Martina Kuníková (SVK)
5 September 2022; 11:30	Report	Score by quarters: 1–3, 2–4, 1–1, 5–4			Spaladium Arena, Split; Referees: Maria Daskalopoulou (GRE), Martina Kuníková (SVK)
5 September 2022; 11:30	Report	Tadday 3	Goals	Ilić, Novakovic 4	Spaladium Arena, Split; Referees: Maria Daskalopoulou (GRE), Martina Kuníková (SVK)

== Knockout stage ==
=== Bracket ===
Quarter-finals
5 September
Netherlands	22
France	3
5 September
Hungary	11
Spain	15
5 September
Greece	14
Israel	4
5 September
Croatia	8
Italy	16

Semi-finals
7 September
Netherlands	7
Spain	10
7 September
Greece	12
Italy	9

Final
9 September
Spain	9
Greece	6
Third place
9 September
Netherlands	13
Italy	16

=== Quarterfinals ===
5 September 2022; 16:00	Report	Netherlands	22–3	France	Spaladium Arena, Split; Referees: Alessia Ferrari (ITA), Ursula Wengenroth (SUI)
5 September 2022; 16:00	Report	Score by quarters: 3–0, 5–2, 7–0, 7–1			Spaladium Arena, Split; Referees: Alessia Ferrari (ITA), Ursula Wengenroth (SUI)
5 September 2022; 16:00	Report	Keuning, Van de Kraats 4	Goals	Dhalluin 2	Spaladium Arena, Split; Referees: Alessia Ferrari (ITA), Ursula Wengenroth (SUI)

5 September 2022; 17:30	Report	Croatia	8–16	Italy	Spaladium Arena, Split; Referees: Nóra Debreceni (HUN), Marta Cabañas (ESP)
5 September 2022; 17:30	Report	Score by quarters: 2–5, 2–4, 2–3, 2–4			Spaladium Arena, Split; Referees: Nóra Debreceni (HUN), Marta Cabañas (ESP)
5 September 2022; 17:30	Report	D. Butić 2	Goals	Marletta 3	Spaladium Arena, Split; Referees: Nóra Debreceni (HUN), Marta Cabañas (ESP)

5 September 2022; 19:00	Report	Hungary	11–15	Spain	Spaladium Arena, Split; Referees: Adrian Alexandrescu (ROU), Vojin Putniković (SRB)
5 September 2022; 19:00	Report	Score by quarters: 1–4, 4–2, 3–6, 3–3			Spaladium Arena, Split; Referees: Adrian Alexandrescu (ROU), Vojin Putniković (SRB)
5 September 2022; 19:00	Report	Garda 3	Goals	three players 3	Spaladium Arena, Split; Referees: Adrian Alexandrescu (ROU), Vojin Putniković (SRB)

5 September 2022; 20:30	Report	Greece	14–4	Israel	Spaladium Arena, Split; Referees: Diana Dutilh-Dumas (NED), Aurély Blanchard (FRA)
5 September 2022; 20:30	Report	Score by quarters: 6–1, 2–1, 2–0, 4–2			Spaladium Arena, Split; Referees: Diana Dutilh-Dumas (NED), Aurély Blanchard (FRA)
5 September 2022; 20:30	Report	Myriokefalitaki 4	Goals	four players 1	Spaladium Arena, Split; Referees: Diana Dutilh-Dumas (NED), Aurély Blanchard (FRA)

=== 5–8th place bracket ===
5–8th place semifinals
7 September
France	9
Hungary	19
7 September
Israel	15
Croatia	8

Fifth place
9 September
Hungary	18
Israel	7
Seventh place
9 September
France	13
Croatia	4

==== 5–8th place semifinals ====
7 September 2022; 16:00	Report	France	9–19	Hungary	Spaladium Arena, Split; Referees: Maria Daskalopoulou (GRE), Stanko Ivanovski (MNE)
7 September 2022; 16:00	Report	Score by quarters: 2–6, 4–4, 2–6, 1–3			Spaladium Arena, Split; Referees: Maria Daskalopoulou (GRE), Stanko Ivanovski (MNE)
7 September 2022; 16:00	Report	Guillet 3	Goals	Garda 6	Spaladium Arena, Split; Referees: Maria Daskalopoulou (GRE), Stanko Ivanovski (MNE)

7 September 2022; 17:30	Report	Israel	15–8	Croatia	Spaladium Arena, Split; Referees: Frank Ohme (GER), Radoslaw Koryzna (POL)
7 September 2022; 17:30	Report	Score by quarters: 3–3, 5–1, 5–2, 2–2			Spaladium Arena, Split; Referees: Frank Ohme (GER), Radoslaw Koryzna (POL)
7 September 2022; 17:30	Report	Bogachenko, Hochberg 4	Goals	three players 2	Spaladium Arena, Split; Referees: Frank Ohme (GER), Radoslaw Koryzna (POL)

==== Seventh place game ====
9 September 2022; 16:00	Report	France	13–4	Croatia	Spaladium Arena, Split; Referees: Ursula Wengenroth (SUI), Maria Daskalopoulou (GRE)
9 September 2022; 16:00	Report	Score by quarters: 4–1, 2–0, 2–1, 5–2			Spaladium Arena, Split; Referees: Ursula Wengenroth (SUI), Maria Daskalopoulou (GRE)
9 September 2022; 16:00	Report	five players 2	Goals	four players 1	Spaladium Arena, Split; Referees: Ursula Wengenroth (SUI), Maria Daskalopoulou (GRE)

==== Fifth place game ====
9 September 2022; 17:30	Report	Hungary	18–7	Israel	Spaladium Arena, Split; Referees: Diana Dutilh-Dumas (NED), Marta Cabañas (ESP)
9 September 2022; 17:30	Report	Score by quarters: 3–1, 5–2, 6–1, 4–3			Spaladium Arena, Split; Referees: Diana Dutilh-Dumas (NED), Marta Cabañas (ESP)
9 September 2022; 17:30	Report	Gurisatti 5	Goals	Yaacobi 3	Spaladium Arena, Split; Referees: Diana Dutilh-Dumas (NED), Marta Cabañas (ESP)

=== Semifinals ===
7 September 2022; 19:00	Report	Netherlands	7–10	Spain	Spaladium Arena, Split; Referees: Nóra Debreceni (HUN), Nenad Periš (CRO)
7 September 2022; 19:00	Report	Score by quarters: 2–3, 1–2, 2–1, 2–4			Spaladium Arena, Split; Referees: Nóra Debreceni (HUN), Nenad Periš (CRO)
7 September 2022; 19:00	Report	Sleeking 3	Goals	Ruiz 4	Spaladium Arena, Split; Referees: Nóra Debreceni (HUN), Nenad Periš (CRO)

7 September 2022; 20:30	Report	Greece	12–9	Italy	Spaladium Arena, Split; Referees: Adrian Alexandrescu (ROU), Matan Schwartz (ISR)
7 September 2022; 20:30	Report	Score by quarters: 2–2, 4–2, 4–3, 2–2			Spaladium Arena, Split; Referees: Adrian Alexandrescu (ROU), Matan Schwartz (ISR)
7 September 2022; 20:30	Report	Ninou 3	Goals	Avegno 3	Spaladium Arena, Split; Referees: Adrian Alexandrescu (ROU), Matan Schwartz (ISR)

=== Third place game ===
9 September 2022; 19:00	Report	Netherlands	13–16	Italy	Spaladium Arena, Split; Referees: Nóra Debreceni (HUN), Matan Schwartz (ISR)
9 September 2022; 19:00	Report	Score by quarters: 4–5, 4–3, 4–2, 1–6			Spaladium Arena, Split; Referees: Nóra Debreceni (HUN), Matan Schwartz (ISR)
9 September 2022; 19:00	Report	Van de Kraats 4	Goals	Bianconi 5	Spaladium Arena, Split; Referees: Nóra Debreceni (HUN), Matan Schwartz (ISR)

=== Final ===
9 September 2022; 20:30	Report	Spain	9–6	Greece	Spaladium Arena, Split; Referees: Alessia Ferrari (ITA), Nenad Periš (CRO)
9 September 2022; 20:30	Report	Score by quarters: 3–0, 1–3, 1–0, 4–3			Spaladium Arena, Split; Referees: Alessia Ferrari (ITA), Nenad Periš (CRO)
9 September 2022; 20:30	Report	three players 2	Goals	Chydirioti 2	Spaladium Arena, Split; Referees: Alessia Ferrari (ITA), Nenad Periš (CRO)

== Final standings ==
Rank	Team	Roster
1st place, gold medalist(s)	Spain	Anna Espar, Cristina Nogué, Paula Prats, Bea Ortiz, Nona Pérez, Irene González, Elena Ruiz, Pili Peña, Judith Forca, Paula Camús, Maica García, Paula Leitón, Martina Terré, Laura Ester
2nd place, silver medalist(s)	Greece	Ioanna Stamatopoulou, Eleftheria Plevritou, Ioanna Chydirioti, Eleni Elliniadi, Margarita Plevritou, Elena Xenaki, Eirini Ninou, Maria Patra, Foteini Tricha, Vaso Plevritou, Athina-Dimitra Giannopoulou, Maria Myriokefalitaki, Eleni Sotireli, Stefania Santa, Christina Siouti
3rd place, bronze medalist(s)	Italy	Aurora Condorelli, Chiara Tabani, Agnese Cocchiere, Silvia Avegno, Sofia Giustini, Dafne Bettini, Domitilla Picozzi, Roberta Bianconi, Valeria Palmieri, Claudia Marletta, Luna Di Claudio, Giulia Viacava, Caterina Banchelli, Giuditta Galardi, Lucrezia Lys Cergol
4	Netherlands	Laura Aarts, Iris Wolves, Brigitte Sleeking, Sabrina van der Sloot, Maartje Keuning, Simone van de Kraats, Bente Rogge, Vivian Sevenich, Kitty Joustra, Ilse Koolhaas, Lola Moolhuijzen, Nina ten Broek, Britt van den Dobbelsteen, Fleurien Bosveld, Rozanne Voorvelt
5	Hungary	Alexandra Kiss, Dorottya Szilágyi, Vanda Vályi, Gréta Kurucz-Gurisatti, Brigitta Horváth, Rebecca Parkes, Zsuzsanna Máté, Kinga Peresztegi-Nagy, Dóra Leimeter, Géraldine Mahieu, Kamilla Faragó, Krisztina Garda, Alda Magyari, Dalmát Dömsödi, Tamara Farkas
6	Israel	Ayelet Peres, Alma Yaacobi, Yahav Farkash, Miriam Bogachenko, Kerem Noy, Hila Futorian, Shunit Strugo, Lior Ben David, Dar Menakerman, Noa Sasover, Nofar Hochberg, Veronika Kordonskaia, Inbar Geva, Moran Lindhout, Tahel Levi
7	France	Anne Collas, Estelle Millot, Gabrielle Fitaire, Camélia Bouloukbachi, Louise Guillet, Morgane Le Roux, Juliette Dhalluin, Aurélie Battu, Ema Vernoux, Viviane Bahia, Lucie Josiane Fanara, Audrey Daule, Valentine Heurtaux, Tiziana Raspo, Chloé Vidal
8	Croatia	Alexandra Ratković, Emmi Miljković, Nina Eterović, Domina Butić, Magdalena Butić, Matea Skelin, Kiara Brnetić, Dora Kangler, Iva Rožić, Ivana Butić, Bruna Barišić, Jelena Butić, Andrea Marić, Ana Desnica, Dina Lordan
9	Serbia	Vanja Lazić, Anja Švec, Lolita Avdić, Ana Milićević, Iva Lujić, Anja Mišković, Janja Kaplarević, Nada Mandić, Jelena Vuković, Hristina Ilić, Kristina Miladinović, Milana Popov, Nikolina Travar, Jana Lujić, Nađa Novaković
10	Germany	Darja Heinbichner, Belén Vosseberg, Ioanna Petiki, Sinia Plotz, Gesa Deike, Ira Deike, Anne Rieck, Aylin Fry, Greta Tadday, Marijke Kijlstra, Jana Stüwe, Lynn Krukenberg, Felicitas Guse, Elena Ludwig, Franka Lipinski
11	Romania	Maria Dvorzhetska, Demi Cărpătorea, Krisztina Szeghalmi, Nikolette Laboncz, Xenia Bonca, Andra Bunea, Johanna Tozh, Chelsea Gandrabura, Alina Olteanu, Debora Nagy, Szabina Szilagyi, Anastasia Melnychuk, Ana Dumitru, Alexia Matei Guiman, Diana Togănel
12	Slovakia	Bronislava Šepeľová, Kristína Stehlíková, Beáta Kováčiková, Janka Kurucová, Lenka Garančovská, Monika Sedláková, Karin Kačková, Júlia Janovová, Tamara Dubná, Martina Kiernoszová, Nikita Pettyová, Emma Dvoranová

== Awards and statistics ==
=== Top goalscorers ===
Rank	Name	Goals	Shots	%
1	(Hungary) Gréta Gurisatti	27	39	69
2	(Netherlands) Simone van de Kraats	24	36	67
3	(Israel) Maria Bogachenko	20	41	49
3	(Italy) Sofia Giustini	20	42	48
3	(Netherlands) Maartje Keuning	20	27	74
6	(France) Louise Guillet	18	38	47
6	(Italy) Silvia Avegno	18	30	60
6	(Netherlands) Brigitte Sleeking	18	27	67
6	(Spain) Maica García Godoy	18	26	69
10	(Netherlands) Kitty-Lynn Joustra	17	25	68
10	(Spain) Beatriz Ortiz	17	39	44
10	(Spain) Elena Ruiz	17	46	37

=== Awards ===
The awards were announced on 9 September 2022.

Position	Player
Best goalkeeper	(Spain) Martina Terré
Most Valuable Player	(Greece) Eleftheria Plevritou
