= Alkisti Avramidou =

Greek water polo player

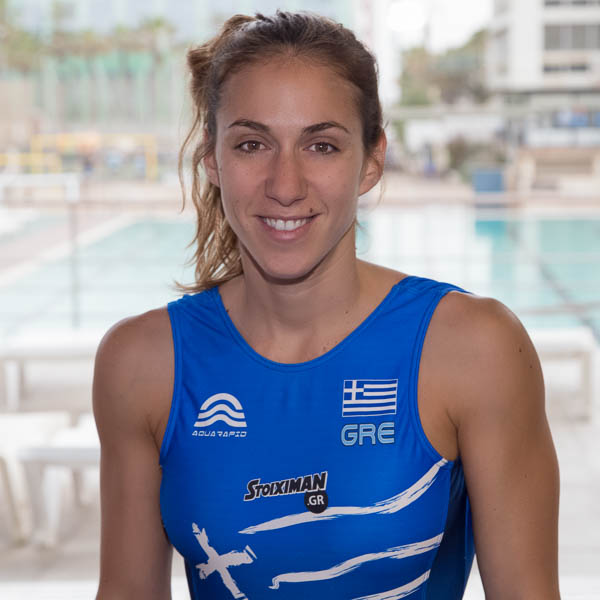
- Avramidou in Barcelona on April 28, 2015

Personal information
- Nationality: Greek
- Born: February 26, 1988 (age 38) Thessaloniki, Greece
- Height: 5 ft 7 in (170 cm)
- Weight: 130 lb (59 kg)

Sport
- Sport: Water polo
- Club: Olympiacos
Medal record
Women's water polo
Representing Greece
World Championship
Gold medal – first place	2011 Shanghai	Team competition
European Championship
Silver medal – second place	2010 Zagreb	Team competition
Silver medal – second place	2012 Eindhoven	Team competition
Silver medal – second place	2018 Barcelona	Team competition
FINA World League
Bronze medal – third place	2010 La Jolla	Team competition
Bronze medal – third place	2012 Changshu	Team competition
LEN Europa Cup
Gold medal – first place	2018 Pontevedra	Team competition
Mediterranean Games
Bronze medal – third place	2018 Tarragona	Team competition

Alkisti Avramidou (Greek: Άλκηστη Αβραμίδου; born 26 February 1988) is a female Greek former water polo player.

Avramidou was part of the Greece women's national water polo team awarded the Gold Medal at the 2011 World Aquatics Championships which took place in Shanghai in July 2011.

== Club career ==
- 2007–2021 Olympiacos Piraeus

== Club honours ==
=== Olympiacos ===
- 2 LEN Euro League
  - 2015, 2021
- 1 LEN Super Cup
  - 2015.
- 1 LEN Trophy
  - 2014.
- 10 Greek Championships
  - 2009, 2011, 2014, 2015, 2016, 2017, 2018, 2019, 2020, 2021
- 3 Greek Cup
  - 2018, 2020, 2021

== National team honours ==
- (gold) Gold medal
  - World Championship (1): 2011
  - Europa Cup (1): 2018
- (silver) Silver medals
  - European Championship (3): 2010, 2012, 2018
- (bronze) Bronze medals
  - World League (2): 2010, 2012
  - Mediterranean Games (1): 2018

== See also ==
- List of world champions in women's water polo
- List of World Aquatics Championships medalists in water polo
