= Greece national water polo team =

Greece national water polo team may refer to:

- Greece men's national water polo team
- Greece women's national water polo team
