= Athina-Dimitra Giannopoulou =

Greek water polo player

Athina Giannopoulou
Personal information
- Full name: Athina‑Dimitra Giannopoulou
- Born: 6 December 2001 (age 24) Athens, Greece
- Height: 1.73 m (5 ft 8 in)

Sport
- Sport: Water polo
- Position: Wing
- Club: CN Sabadell, Spain
Medal record
World Aquatics Championships
| Gold medal – first place | 2025 Singapore | Team |
European Water Polo Championship
| Silver medal – second place | 2022 Split | Team |
| Bronze medal – third place | 2024 Eindhoven | Team |

Athina‑Dimitra Giannopoulou (Greek: Αθηνά‑Δήμητρα Γιαννοπούλου; Athens, 6 December 2001) is a Greek international water polo player who competes as a wing for the Spanish water polo team, Sabadell, and is a basic member of the Greece women's national water polo team.

She represented Greece at the 2024 Summer Olympics in Paris, where Greece finished in the seventh place. She was a key player when Greece won the gold medal in 2025 FINA Women's Water Polo World Cup.

== Career ==
Giannopoulou began her senior club career with Vouliagmeni Nautical Club in the Greek A1 Ethniki Women's Water Polo League, where she was a key player in Vouliagmeni's championship victory in 2025.

In July 2025, Giannopoulou signed with Spanish powerhouse, Astralpool Club Natació Sabadell, ahead of the 2025–26 season.

== With Greece's national team ==
Giannopoulou has been a regular member of the Greece women's national team at major international competitions. She competed at the 2024 Women's European Water Polo Championship in Eindhoven, helping Greece secure the bronze medal.

At the 2025 World Aquatics Championships in Singapore, Giannopoulou was a key part of the Greek team that won the gold medal.

In 2026, due to an injury, she fully missed the 2026 Women's European Water Polo Championship held in Portugal.

== Personal life ==
She has studied business administration at the University of Piraeus.

== See also ==
- Greece women's national water polo team
