= Maria Patra =

Greek water polo player

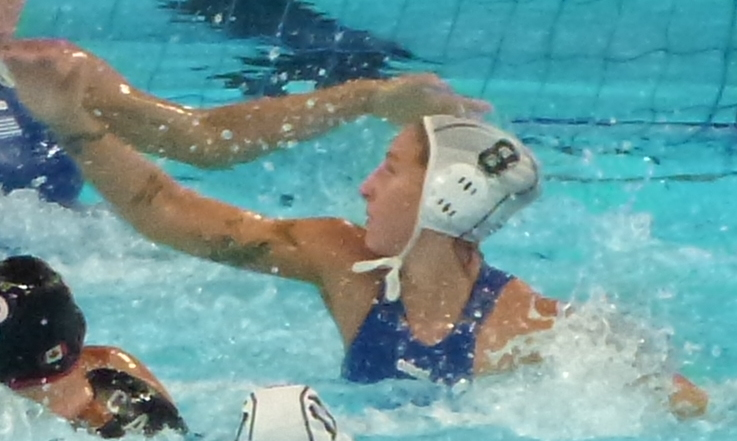

Personal information
- Nationality: Greek
- Born: 17 October 1998 (age 28)
- Height: 1.77 m (5 ft 10 in)
- Weight: 72 kg (159 lb)

Sport
- Sport: Water polo
- Handedness: Right
- Position: Defender
- Current club: NC Vouliagmeni

Senior clubs
- Years: Team
- NC Vouliagmeni
National team
- Years: Team
- Greece
Medal record
World Championship
Gold medal – first place	2025 Singapore	Team
European Championships
Silver medal – second place	2022 Split
Bronze medal – third place	2024 Eindhoven
Bronze medal – third place	2026 Funchal
European Games
Bronze medal – third place	2015 Baku	Team

Maria Patra (born 17 October 1998) is a Greek water polo player for NC Vouliagmeni and the Greece women's national water polo team.

She participated at the 2018 Women's European Water Polo Championship. She won the silver medal at the 2022 Women's European Water Polo Championship.

== Personal ==
Her father Evangelos Patras is a former waterpolo goalkeeper.
