= Antiopi Melidoni =

Greek water polo player

Personal information
- Born: 11 October 1977 (age 48) Athens, Greece
- Height: 171 cm (5 ft 7 in)
- Weight: 63 kg (139 lb)
Medal record
Women's water polo
Representing Greece
Olympic Games
Silver medal – second place	2004 Athens	Team
World Championship
Gold medal – first place	2011 Shanghai	Team

Antiopi Melidoni (Greek: Αντιόπη Μελιδώνη, born 11 October 1977) is a Greek water polo player and Olympic silver medalist.

She received a silver medal at the 2004 Summer Olympics in 2004 Athens with the Greek women's national team.

== See also ==
- List of Olympic medalists in water polo (women)
- List of world champions in women's water polo
- List of World Aquatics Championships medalists in water polo
