= Vasiliki Diamantopoulou =

Greece water polo player

Personal information
- Nationality: Greek
- Born: 12 March 1993 (age 33)
- Height: 1.80 m (5 ft 11 in)
- Weight: 73 kg (161 lb)

Sport
- Sport: Water polo
- Handedness: Right
- Position: Defender
- Current club: NC Vouliagmeni

Vasiliki Diamantopoulou (Greek: Βασιλική Διαμαντοπούλου, born 12 March 1993) is a Greek water polo player for NC Vouliagmeni and the Greece women's national water polo team.

She participated at the 2018 Women's European Water Polo Championship.
