= Giorgos Morfesis =

Greek water polo coach

Personal information
- Born: October 22, 1969 (age 56) Piraeus, Greece
Medal record
Head coach for Women's Water Polo
Representing Greece
World Championship
| Gold medal – first place | 2011 Shanghai | Coach |
European Championship
| Silver medal – second place | 2010 Zagreb | Coach |
| Silver medal – second place | 2012 Eindhoven | Coach |
| Silver medal – second place | 2018 Barcelona | Coach |
FINA World League
| Bronze medal – third place | 2010 San Diego | Coach |
| Bronze medal – third place | 2012 Changshu | Coach |

Giorgos Morfesis (Greek: Γιώργος Μορφέσης, born 22 October 1969 in Piraeus) is a Greek water polo coach, who has been in charge of the Greece women's national water polo team during the years 2010-2020.

He started his playing career in Ethnikos Piraeus at the age of 13 but due to the elite players that Ethnikos had in the 80s, Morfesis stopped his career at the age of 18 as an athlete. He won the Greek cup with Ethnikos as a coach in 2000 beating rivals Olympiacos in the final, at the age of 30 years old.

He was then assistant coach in the women's national team under coaches Moudatsios and Iosifidis before becoming a head coach with the national team.

Morfesis was the head coach of Greece women's national water polo team that won the gold medal at the 2011 World Championship which took place in Shanghai in July 2011. He has also coached Greece to three silver medals in the 2010, 2012 and 2018 European Championships and two bronze medals in the 2010 and 2012 FINA World Leagues.

== See also ==
- List of world champions in women's water polo
