= Ilektra Psouni =

Greece water polo player

Personal information
- Full name: Ilektra Maria Psouni
- Born: 12 September 1985 (age 40) Greece
- Height: 169 cm (5 ft 7 in)
- Weight: 63 kg (139 lb)

Sport
- Sport: Water polo
Medal record
Women's water polo
Representing Greece
World Championship
Gold medal – first place	2011 Shanghai	Team competition

Ilektra Maria Psouni (born 12 September 1985) is a water polo player from Greece. She was part of the Greece women's national water polo team awarded the gold medal at the 2011 World Championship which took place in Shanghai in July 2011. She also competed in the 2013 World Aquatics Championships.

== See also ==
- List of world champions in women's water polo
- List of World Aquatics Championships medalists in water polo
