= Ioanna Chydirioti =

Greece water polo player

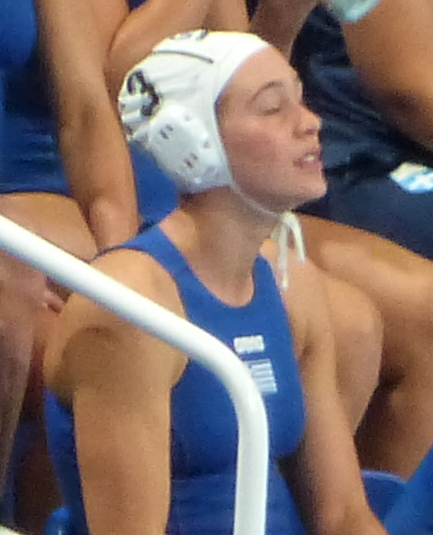

Personal information
- Nationality: Greek
- Born: 15 April 1997 (age 29)
- Height: 1.77 m (5 ft 10 in)
- Weight: 67 kg (148 lb)

Sport
- Sport: Water polo
- Handedness: Right
- Position: Field player
- Current club: Olympiacos

Senior clubs
- Years: Team
- NC Vouliagmeni; Olympiacos
National team
- Years: Team
- Greece
Medal record
European Championships
Silver medal – second place	2022 Split
Bronze medal – third place	2024 Eindhoven
Mediterranean Games
Bronze medal – third place	2018 Tarragona	Team

Ioanna Chydirioti (born 15 April 1997) is a Greek water polo player for Olympiacos and the Greece women's national water polo team.

She participated at the 2018 Women's European Water Polo Championship.
