= Christina Tsoukala =

Greek water polo player

Personal information
- Full name: Christina Chrysoula Tsoukala
- Born: 8 July 1991 (age 35) Athens, Greece
- Height: 184 cm (6 ft 0 in)
- Weight: 74 kg (163 lb)

Sport
- Sport: Water polo
- Club: Vouliagmeni Olympiacos
Medal record
Women's water polo
Representing Greece
World Championship
Gold medal – first place	2011 Shanghai	Team competition
European Championship
Silver medal – second place	2010 Zagreb	Team competition
Silver medal – second place	2012 Eindhoven	Team competition
Silver medal – second place	2018 Barcelona	Team competition

Christina Chrysoula Tsoukala (Greek: Χριστίνα Χρυσούλα Τσουκαλά, born 8 July 1991) is a former water polo player who played for Vouliagmeni Women's Water Polo Team, Olympiacos and the Greece women's national water polo team.

She was part of the Greece national team that won the gold medal at the 2011 World Aquatics Championships held in Shanghai in July 2011.

== Biography ==
Christina is of Icelandic descent and a granddaughter of Kristín Guðmundsdóttir and Valsteinn Guðjónsson. She speaks excellent Icelandic and tries to visit Iceland at least once every year.

== See also ==
- List of world champions in women's water polo
- List of World Aquatics Championships medalists in water polo
