= Alexandra Asimaki =

Greek water polo player

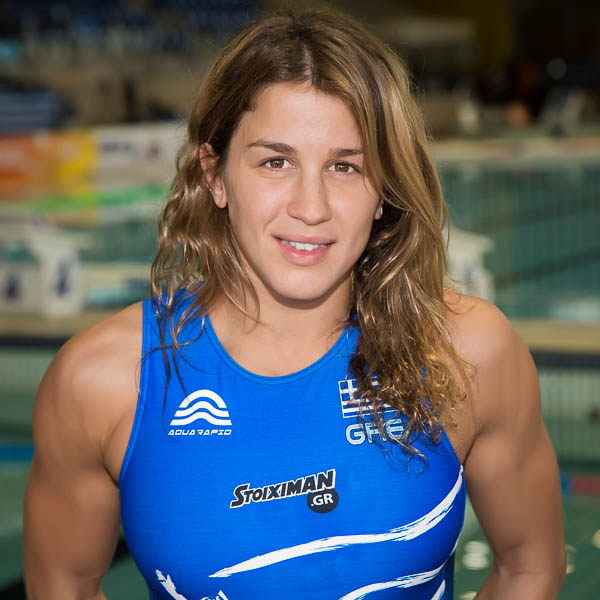
- Asimaki in 2015

Personal information
- Nationality: Greek
- Born: 28 June 1988 (age 37) Athens, Greece
- Height: 1.71 m (5 ft 7 in)
- Weight: 61 kg (134 lb)

Sport
- Country: Greece
- Sport: Water polo
Medal record
Women's water polo
Representing Greece
World Championship
Gold medal – first place	2011 Shanghai	Team
European Championship
Silver medal – second place	2010 Zagreb
Silver medal – second place	2012 Eindhoven
Silver medal – second place	2018 Barcelona
Bronze medal – third place	2024 Eindhoven
FINA World League
Gold medal – first place	2005 Kirishi
Bronze medal – third place	2010 La Jolla
Bronze medal – third place	2012 Changshu
LEN Europa Cup
Gold medal – first place	2018 Pontevedra
Mediterranean Games
Bronze medal – third place	2018 Tarragona

Alexandra Asimaki (Greek: Αλεξάνδρα Ασημάκη; pronounced [alexandra asimaki]; born 28 June 1988) is a Greek water polo player considered one of the best female water polo players in the world in the 21st century.

Asimaki was part of the Greece women's national water polo team awarded the Gold Medal at the 2011 World Championship which took place in Shanghai in July 2011. After her outstanding performance in this tournament, she was named best European and World Female Water Polo Player of the Year 2011.

== Club career ==
- 2004–2006 Nautical Club of Vouliagmeni
- 2006–2007 CN Ciudad de Alcorcón
- 2007–2014 Nautical Club of Vouliagmeni
- 2014–2020 Olympiacos Piraeus
- 2021–today Alimos

== Club honours ==
=== Vouliagmeni ===
- LEN Champions Cups
  - 2009 and 2010
- LEN Super Cups
  - 2009 and 2010
- Greek Championships
  - 2005, 2006, 2010, 2012 and 2013

=== Olympiacos ===
- LEN Euro League
  - 2015
- LEN Super Cup
  - 2015
- Greek Championships
  - 2015, 2016, 2017, 2018, 2019 and 2020
- Greek Cups
  - 2018 and 2020

=== Alcorcón ===
- Spanish Cup
  - 2007

== National team honours ==
- (gold) Gold medals
  - World Championship: 2011.
  - World League: 2005.
  - Europa Cup: 2018.
- (silver) Silver medals
  - European Championship: 2010, 2012 and 2018.
- (bronze) Bronze medals
  - European Championship: 2024
  - World League: 2010 and 2012.
  - Mediterranean Games: 2018.

== Individual awards ==
- FINA World Water Polo Player of the Year
  - 2011
- LEN European Water Polo Player of the Year
  - 2011

== See also ==
- List of world champions in women's water polo
- List of World Aquatics Championships medalists in water polo

Awards
Preceded by (United States) Elizabeth Armstrong	FINA Water Polo Player of the Year; 2011	Succeeded by (United States) Maggie Steffens

Awards
Preceded by (Russia) Sofia Konukh	LEN Water Polo Player of the Year; 2011	Succeeded by (Spain) Anni Espar
