= 2018 LEN Women's Europa Cup =

- League: LEN Europa Cup
- Sport: Water polo
- Duration: 1 February–24 March 2018
- Number of teams: 10

Super Final
- Champions: Greece
- Runners-up: Russia

LEN Europa Cup seasons
- 2019 →

The 2018 LEN Women's Europa Cup is the inaugural tournament of the LEN Europa Cup.

== Preliminary round ==
=== Group A ===
February 1–4, 2018, Oosterhout, Netherlands

Pos	Team	Pld	W	D	L	GF	GA	GD	Pts	Qualification	Spain	Netherlands	Russia	France	Croatia
1	Spain	4	3	1	0	63	25	+38	10	Semifinals	—			22–5	25–5
2	Netherlands (H)	4	2	2	0	60	25	+35	8	Quarterfinals	8–8	—	7–7	19–5	26–5
3	Russia	4	2	1	1	56	24	+32	7	Quarterfinals	7–8		—		24–5
4	France	4	1	0	3	29	64	−35	3				4–18	—	15–5
5	Croatia	4	0	0	4	20	90	−70	0						—

Source: LEN
(H) Hosts

=== Group B ===
February 1–4, 2018, Volos, Greece

Pos	Team	Pld	W	D	L	GF	GA	GD	Pts	Qualification	Greece	Hungary	Italy	Germany	Israel
1	Greece (H)	4	3	1	0	76	24	+52	10	Semifinals	—	8–5	11–11	32–3	25–5
2	Hungary	4	3	0	1	64	23	+41	9	Quarterfinals		—		26–3	
3	Italy	4	2	1	1	64	25	+39	7	Quarterfinals		9–11	—	25–3	19–0
4	Germany	4	1	0	3	20	92	−72	3					—	
5	Israel	4	0	0	4	17	77	−60	0			3–22		9–11	—

Source: LEN
(H) Hosts

== Super Final ==
March 22–24, 2018, Pontevedra, Spain

Location of the 2018 LEN Women's Europa Cup Super Final

=== Qualified teams ===
Group	Winners	Runners-up	Third
A	Spain	Netherlands	Russia
B	Greece	Hungary	Italy

=== Bracket ===
Quarterfinals
22 March
Netherlands	8
Italy	6
22 March
Hungary	9
Russia	11

Semifinals
23 March
Netherlands	6
Greece	8
23 March
Russia	9
Spain	8

Gold medal match
24 March
Greece	9
Russia	8
Bronze medal match
24 March
Netherlands	3
Spain	8

5th place match
23 March
Italy	7
Hungary	6

=== Quarterfinals ===
All times are CET (UTC+1).

22 March 2018; 17:00	Report	Netherlands	8–6	Italy	Pontevedra, Spain; Referees: Carlos Ortega (ESP), Nikolaos Boudramis (GRE)
22 March 2018; 17:00	Report	Score by quarters: 1–2, 3–0, 1–2, 3–2			Pontevedra, Spain; Referees: Carlos Ortega (ESP), Nikolaos Boudramis (GRE)
22 March 2018; 17:00	Report	Van de Kraats 4	Goals	Garibotti 2	Pontevedra, Spain; Referees: Carlos Ortega (ESP), Nikolaos Boudramis (GRE)

22 March 2018; 18:45	Report	Hungary	9–11	Russia	Pontevedra, Spain; Referees: Diana Dutilh-Dumas (NED), Daniele Bianco (ITA)
22 March 2018; 18:45	Report	Score by quarters: 2–3, 0–3, 5–4, 2–1			Pontevedra, Spain; Referees: Diana Dutilh-Dumas (NED), Daniele Bianco (ITA)
22 March 2018; 18:45	Report	three players 2	Goals	Prokofyeva 4	Pontevedra, Spain; Referees: Diana Dutilh-Dumas (NED), Daniele Bianco (ITA)

=== Semifinals ===
All times are CET (UTC+1).

23 March 2018; 18:45	Report	Netherlands	6–8	Greece	Pontevedra, Spain; Referees: Svetlana Dreval (RUS), Daniele Bianco (ITA)
23 March 2018; 18:45	Report	Score by quarters: 3–2, 0–3, 0–2, 3–1			Pontevedra, Spain; Referees: Svetlana Dreval (RUS), Daniele Bianco (ITA)
23 March 2018; 18:45	Report	Van der Sloot 2	Goals	E. Plevritou 2	Pontevedra, Spain; Referees: Svetlana Dreval (RUS), Daniele Bianco (ITA)

23 March 2018; 20:30	Report	Russia	9–8	Spain	Pontevedra, Spain; Referees: Attila Marosvári (HUN), Nikolaos Boudramis (GRE)
23 March 2018; 20:30	Report	Score by quarters: 2–2, 4–2, 2–3, 1–1			Pontevedra, Spain; Referees: Attila Marosvári (HUN), Nikolaos Boudramis (GRE)
23 March 2018; 20:30	Report	Prokofyeva, Simanovich 2	Goals	Forca, B. Ortiz 3	Pontevedra, Spain; Referees: Attila Marosvári (HUN), Nikolaos Boudramis (GRE)

=== 5th place match ===
All times are CET (UTC+1).

23 March 2018; 17:00	Report	Italy	7–6	Hungary	Pontevedra, Spain; Referees: Diana Dutilh-Dumas (NED), Carlos Ortega (ESP)
23 March 2018; 17:00	Report	Score by quarters: 3–1, 0–0, 2–3, 2–2			Pontevedra, Spain; Referees: Diana Dutilh-Dumas (NED), Carlos Ortega (ESP)
23 March 2018; 17:00	Report	Bianconi 5	Goals	Gurisatti 3	Pontevedra, Spain; Referees: Diana Dutilh-Dumas (NED), Carlos Ortega (ESP)

=== Bronze medal match ===
All times are CET (UTC+1).

24 March 2018; 12:00	Report	Netherlands	3–9	Spain	Pontevedra, Spain; Referees: Svetlana Dreval (RUS), Attila Marosvári (HUN)
24 March 2018; 12:00	Report	Score by quarters: 2–1, 0–3, 1–2, 0–3			Pontevedra, Spain; Referees: Svetlana Dreval (RUS), Attila Marosvári (HUN)
24 March 2018; 12:00	Report	van der Sloot 2	Goals	A. Espar 3	Pontevedra, Spain; Referees: Svetlana Dreval (RUS), Attila Marosvári (HUN)

=== Gold medal match ===
All times are CET (UTC+1).

24 March 2018; 14:00	Report	Greece	9–8	Russia	Pontevedra, Spain; Referees: Diana Dutilh-Dumas (NED), Carlos Ortega (ESP)
24 March 2018; 14:00	Report	Score by quarters: 0–1, 2–1, 4–1, 3–5			Pontevedra, Spain; Referees: Diana Dutilh-Dumas (NED), Carlos Ortega (ESP)
24 March 2018; 14:00	Report	three players 2	Goals	Ivanova 2	Pontevedra, Spain; Referees: Diana Dutilh-Dumas (NED), Carlos Ortega (ESP)

== Final ranking ==
Rank	Team
Gold medal	Greece
Silver medal	Russia
Bronze medal	Spain
4	Netherlands
5	Italy
6	Hungary

2018 LEN Women's Europa Cup champions

Greece
First title
