= Beatriz Ortiz =

Spanish water polo player (born 1995)

Bea Ortiz
Personal information
- Full name: Beatriz Ortiz Muñoz
- Nickname: Bea
- Nationality: Spanish
- Born: 21 June 1995 (age 31) Terrassa, Spain
- Height: 176 cm (69 in)
- Weight: 65 kg (143 lb)

Sport
- Sport: Water polo
- Handedness: R
- Position: Driver
National team
- Years: Team
- 2016–: Spain
Medal record
Olympic Games
Gold medal – first place	2024 Paris	Team
Silver medal – second place	2020 Tokyo	Team
World Championships
Silver medal – second place	2017 Budapest	Team
Silver medal – second place	2019 Gwangju	Team
Silver medal – second place	2023 Fukuoka	Team
Bronze medal – third place	2024 Doha	Team
Bronze medal – third place	2025 Singapore	Team
European Championships
Gold medal – first place	2020 Budapest
Gold medal – first place	2022 Split
Silver medal – second place	2024 Eindhoven
Bronze medal – third place	2018 Barcelona
World Cup
Bronze medal – third place	2023 Long Beach
Mediterranean Games
Gold medal – first place	2018 Tarragona	Team

Beatriz Ortiz Muñoz (born 21 June 1995) is a Spanish female water polo player who competed at the 2016 Summer Olympics representing Spain national water polo team.

In 2018 she won the gold medal at the Mediterranean Games and the bronze at the European Water Polo Championship

== See also ==
- List of World Aquatics Championships medalists in water polo
