= Charis Pavlidis =

Greek water polo player and coach

Charis or Haris Pavlidis
Personal information
- Nationality: Greek
- Born: January 25, 1971 (age 55) Thessaloniki, Greece

Sport
- Sport: Water polo
- Club: Olympiacos Women's Water Polo Team
- Coached by: Greece women's national team (2024–present)

Charis (Haris) Pavlidis (Greek: Χάρης Παυλίδης, born 25 January 1971) is a retired Greek water polo player, and current water polo coach who is presently the head coach of the Greece women's national water polo team.

He has previously coached the Olympiacos Women's Water Polo Team and under his leadership, Olympiacos became one of the dominant teams in European women's water polo, winning two LEN Euro Leagues, two LEN Super Cups, one LEN Trophy and ten Greek Championships.

As a player, Pavlidis was a defender for Olympiacos from 1991 to 2000, winning several domestic titles and competing in two LEN Champions League finals. He also represented the Greece men's national water polo team at international competitions.

== Coaching career ==
=== Olympiacos Women (2007–2021) ===
Pavlidis took over as head coach of Olympiacos Women's Water Polo Team in 2007. Under his guidance, the team won:

- 2 LEN Euro Leagues (2015, 2021)
- 2 LEN Super Cups
- 1 LEN Trophy
- 10 Greek Championships
- 9 Greek Cups and 1 Greek Super Cup

During his tenure, Olympiacos also recorded a streak of 163 consecutive wins in Greek competitions, establishing themselves as one of the strongest sides in European women’s water polo.

=== Greece Women’s National Team (2024–present) ===
In November 2024, Pavlidis was appointed as the head coach of the Greece women’s national team. He led the team to victory at the 2025 Women's Water Polo World Cup in Chengdu, China, defeating Hungary 13–9 in the final to secure Greece’s first-ever gold medal in the tournament.

In July 2025, at the World Aquatics Championships, Pavlidis guided Greece to the semifinals with a dramatic 8–7 win over Australia, and afterwards, reaching the final of World Championships against Hungary, after a historic win (14-10) over the defending champion, USA.

In February 2026, Pavlidis guided the Greek national team in the 2026 Women's European Water Polo Championship, in which Greece finally won the bronze medal, after beating Italy in the bronze medal final.

== Honours ==
=== As a coach ===
- LEN Euro League Women: 2 titles (2015, 2021)
- Women's LEN Super Cup: 2 titles
- Women's LEN Trophy: 1 title
- Greek Championships: 10 titles
- Women's Water Polo World Cup: Gold medal (2025)
- Women's Water Polo World Aquatics Championships: Gold medal (2025)
- Women's Water Polo European Championship: Bronze medal (2026)
