= Eirini Ninou =

Greek water polo player

Personal information
- Nationality: Greece
- Born: 20 September 2002 (age 24) Glyfada, Greece
- Height: 170 cm (67 in)
- Weight: 62 kg (137 lb)

Sport
- Sport: Water polo
- Handedness: R
- Position: Wing
- Current club: Ethnikos Piraeus Water Polo Club
- Number: 7

Senior clubs
- Years: Team
- Ethnikos Piraeus Water Polo Club
Medal record
World Championship
Gold medal – first place	2025 Singapore	Team
European Championships
Silver medal – second place	2022 Split
Bronze medal – third place	2024 Eindhoven
Bronze medal – third place	2026 Funchal

Eirini Ninou (born 20 September 2002) is a Greek water polo player for Ethnikos Piraeus in Greece. She is one of the best strikers in Europe in water polo.

Ninou was a part of the Greek national team winning the silver medal in the 2022 Women's European Water Polo Championship at Split, Croatia, and also the silver medal in the 2024 Women's European Water Polo Championship at Eindhoven, The Netherlands. With Ethnikos she won the 2023–24 Greek Cup beating Piraeus rivals, Olympiacos.
