= Stefania Santa =

Greek water polo player (born 2004)

Personal information
- Nationality: Greek
- Born: 6 September 2004 (age 22) Bucharest
- Height: 1.78 m (5 ft 10 in)
- Weight: 62 kg (137 lb)

Sport
- Country: Greece
- Sport: Water polo
- Club: Olympiacos

Stefania Santa (Greek: Στεφανία Σάντα; born on 6 September 2004) is a Greek water polo player who plays as a wing for Olympiacos and the Greece women's national water polo team.

== Career ==
Santa began her career with NC Vouliagmeni before transferring to Olympiacos in 2022. At youth level, she won a silver medal at the FINA Women's U18 Water Polo World Championships and a bronze medal at the U19 European Championships.

Santa has been a member of the Greece women's national team, contributing to major international successes. She was part of the Greek squad that won the gold medal at the 2025 World Aquatics Championships and the 2025 World Cup (water polo). She was also included in the team that won a bronze medal at the 2024 European Women's Water Polo Championship. Domestically, Santa has competed with Olympiacos in Greek and European competitions, and was named the Most Valuable Player of the Greek Women's Water Polo Cup in 2026.

Santa has represented Greece in multiple major tournaments. She was included in the roster for the 2025 World Aquatics Championships. In 2026, she missed the European Championship due to health issues.

== Personal life ==
Santa is the daughter of Stefanos-Petre Santa, a former water polo player, and was born in Romania before growing up in Greece.
