= Christina Siouti =

Greek water polo player

Personal information
- National team: Greece
- Born: 1 September 2004 (age 22) Piraeus, Greece
- Height: 1.80 m (5 ft 11 in)
- Weight: 71 kg (157 lb)

Sport
- Sport: Water polo
- Position: Defender
- Club: Olympiacos
Medal record
Women's water polo
Representing Greece
World Aquatics Championships
Gold medal – first place	2025 Singapore	Team
European Championship
Silver medal – second place	2022 Split	Team
Bronze medal – third place	2026 Funchal	Team

Christina Siouti (born 1 September 2004) is a Greek water polo player who plays as a defender for Olympiacos Piraeus and the Greece women's national team.

Recognised for her defensive skills, she is considered one of the stars of Greek water polo.

== Career ==
Siouti began her sporting career in swimming before transitioning to water polo at a young age. She initially trained with Milonas Neas Smyrnis, where her abilities in water polo were identified during her early adolescence.

At club level, she has competed with Olympiacos Piraeus, one of the leading teams in European women's water polo. With Olympiacos, she has won domestic competitions including the Greek Championship and Greek Cup, as well as European titles such as the LEN Euro League Women and the LEN Super Cup.

=== International career ===
She was a member of the senior national team that won the gold medal at the 2025 World Aquatics Championships in Singapore.
