= Eleni Xenaki =

Greek water polo player

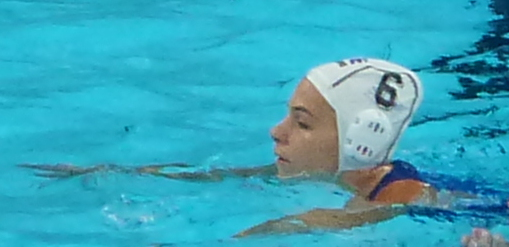
- Xenaki in 2024

Personal information
- Born: 5 July 1997 (age 29) Athens, Greece
- Height: 1.77 m (5 ft 10 in)
- Weight: 80 kg (176 lb)

Sport
- Sport: Water polo
- Club: Vouliagmeni Nautical Club
Medal record
World Championship
Gold medal – first place	2025 Singapore	Team
European Championship
Silver medal – second place	2018 Barcelona
Silver medal – second place	2022 Split
Bronze medal – third place	2024 Eindhoven
Bronze medal – third place	2026 Funchal
Mediterranean Games
Bronze medal – third place	2018 Tarragona	Team

Eleni Xenaki (Greek: Ελένη Ξενάκη; born 5 July 1997), also known as Elena Xenaki, is a Greek female water polo player, who was part of the Greek national team that won the silver medal at the 2018 European Championship in Barcelona and the sixth place at the 2015 World Aquatics Championships.

At club level, she played for Olympiacos water polo team. In the season 2025–2026, she is a key player of the Vouliagmeni Nautical Club.

== See also ==
- Greece at the 2015 World Aquatics Championships
