= Paula Leitón =

Spanish water polo player (born 2000)

Personal information
- Full name: Paula Leitón Arrones
- Born: 27 April 2000 (age 26) Terrassa, Spain
- Height: 1.87 m (6 ft 2 in)
- Weight: 96 kg (212 lb)

Sport
- Sport: Water polo
Medal record
Women's water polo
Representing Spain
Olympic Games
Gold medal – first place	2024 Paris	Team
Silver medal – second place	2020 Tokyo	Team
World Championships
Silver medal – second place	2017 Budapest	Team
Silver medal – second place	2019 Gwangju	Team
Silver medal – second place	2023 Fukuoka	Team
Bronze medal – third place	2024 Doha	Team
Bronze medal – third place	2025 Singapore	Team
European Championships
Gold medal – first place	2020 Budapest
Gold medal – first place	2022 Split
Silver medal – second place	2024 Eindhoven
World Cup
Silver medal – second place	2026 Sydney
Bronze medal – third place	2023 Long Beach
European Games
Silver medal – second place	2015 Baku	Team

Paula Leitón Arrones (Note: In this Spanish name, the first or paternal surname is Leitón and the second or maternal family name is Arrones.) (born 27 April 2000) is a Spanish female water polo player.

She was part of the Spanish team at the 2015 World Aquatics Championships. She participated in the 2016 FINA Youth Water Polo World Championships, winning a silver medal and she represented Spain's women water polo in the Olympic Games of Rio de Janeiro in 2016.

== See also ==
- List of World Aquatics Championships medalists in water polo
