= Water polo at the 2018 Mediterranean Games =

- Venue: Campclar Aquatic Centre
- Dates: 27 June – 1 July
- Nations: 8
- Teams: 8 (men); 6 (women)

Champions
- Men: Serbia
- Women: Spain

The water polo tournament at the 2018 Mediterranean Games in Tarragona took place between 27 June and 1 July at the Campclar Aquatic Centre. It was the first year women's teams were included in the water polo event.

== Medal summary ==
=== Events ===
Event	Gold	Silver	Bronze
Men	Serbia (SRB)	Greece (GRE)	Montenegro (MNE)
Women	Spain (ESP)	Italy (ITA)	Greece (GRE)

=== Medal table ===
Rank	Nation	Gold	Silver	Bronze	Total
1	Serbia	1	0	0	1
1	Spain*	1	0	0	1
3	Greece	0	1	1	2
4	Italy	0	1	0	1
5	Montenegro	0	0	1	1
Totals (5 entries)		2	2	2	6
