= 2025–26 European Aquatics Women's Challenger Cup Final Four =

Women's water polo competition

Tournament details
- Host country: Malta
- Venue: 1 (in 1 host city)
- Dates: 21–22 March
- Teams: 4

Final positions
- Champions: (Turkey) Goztepe SK (3rd title)
- Runners-up: (Croatia) Jadran Split
- Third place: (Germany) SSV Esslingen
- Fourth place: (Portugal) Clube Fluvial

Tournament statistics
- Matches played: 4
- Goals scored: 115 (28.75 per match)

The 2025–26 European Aquatics Women's Challenger Cup Final Four is played between 20 and 22 March 2026 to determine the champions of the 2025–26 European Aquatics Women's Challenger Cup. The Cottonera Sports Complex in Cottonera was used for the tournament.

Goztepe SK won their third title after beating Jadran Split 16–7 in the final.

== Venue ==
The Final Four tournament was held at the Cottonera Sports Complex in Cottonera, Malta.

== Qualified teams ==
Team	Participations (bold indicates winners) (Note: Including Final Four and Final Six.)
(Croatia) Jadran Split	1 (2023–24)
(Germany) SSV Esslingen	None
(Portugal) Clube Fluvial	None
(Turkey) Goztepe SK	2 (**2023–24**, **2024–25**)

== Referees ==
These referees were chosen for the Final Four.

Referees
Greece	Theodora Michailidou
Hungary	Dorottya Bors
Italy	Roberta Grillo
Spain	Belen Gonzalvo

== Bracket ==
Semi-finals
(Germany) SSV Esslingen	14 (6)
**(Croatia) Jadran Split**	**14 (7)**
**(Turkey) Goztepe SK**	**25**
(Portugal) Clube Fluvial	3

Final
(Croatia) Jadran Split	7
**(Turkey) Goztepe SK**	**16**
Third place
**(Germany) SSV Esslingen**	**13**
(Portugal) Clube Fluvial	10

=== Semifinals ===
21 March 2026; 18:30	Report	SSV Esslingen (Germany)	20–**21** (PSO)	(Croatia) **Jadran Split**	Cottonera Sports Complex, Cottonera; Referees: Roberta Grillo (ITA), Dorottya Bors (HUN)
21 March 2026; 18:30	Report	Score by quarters: 1–**4**, 4–**6**, **6**–1, 3–3 PSO: 6–**7**			Cottonera Sports Complex, Cottonera; Referees: Roberta Grillo (ITA), Dorottya Bors (HUN)
21 March 2026; 18:30	Report	Ntona Tsiaka 4	**Goals**	Jankovic 6	Cottonera Sports Complex, Cottonera; Referees: Roberta Grillo (ITA), Dorottya Bors (HUN)

21 March 2026; 20:30	Report	**Goztepe SK** (Turkey)	**25**–3	(Portugal) Clube Fluvial	Cottonera Sports Complex, Cottonera; Referees: Ana Belen Perete Gonzalvo (ESP), Theodora Michailidou (GRE)
21 March 2026; 20:30	Report	Score by quarters: **5**–0, **6**–2, **7**–1, **7**–0			Cottonera Sports Complex, Cottonera; Referees: Ana Belen Perete Gonzalvo (ESP), Theodora Michailidou (GRE)
21 March 2026; 20:30	Report	Wright 6	**Goals**	Teixeira 3	Cottonera Sports Complex, Cottonera; Referees: Ana Belen Perete Gonzalvo (ESP), Theodora Michailidou (GRE)

=== Third place game ===
21 March 2026; 15:00	Report	**SSV Esslingen** (Germany)	**13**–10	(Portugal) Clube Fluvial	Cottonera Sports Complex, Cottonera; Referees: Theodora Michailidou (GRE), Dorottya Bors (HUN)
21 March 2026; 15:00	Report	Score by quarters: **5**–3, 0–**2**, 4–4, **4**–1			Cottonera Sports Complex, Cottonera; Referees: Theodora Michailidou (GRE), Dorottya Bors (HUN)
21 March 2026; 15:00	Report	Haas 4	**Goals**	Pereira 5	Cottonera Sports Complex, Cottonera; Referees: Theodora Michailidou (GRE), Dorottya Bors (HUN)

=== Final ===
22 March 2026; 16:45	Report	Jadran Split (Croatia)	7–**16**	(Turkey) **Goztepe SK**	Cottonera Sports Complex, Cottonera; Referees: Roberta Grillo (ITA), Ana Belen Perete Gonzalvo (ESP)
22 March 2026; 16:45	Report	Score by quarters: 0–**6**, 2–2, 2–**3**, 3–**5**			Cottonera Sports Complex, Cottonera; Referees: Roberta Grillo (ITA), Ana Belen Perete Gonzalvo (ESP)
22 March 2026; 16:45	Report	Butic, Jankovic 3	**Goals**	Kuş 5	Cottonera Sports Complex, Cottonera; Referees: Roberta Grillo (ITA), Ana Belen Perete Gonzalvo (ESP)

2025–26 European Aquatics Women's Challenger Cup Champions

**Goztepe SK**
Third title

== See also ==
- 2025–26 European Aquatics Champions League
- 2025–26 European Aquatics Euro Cup
- 2025–26 European Aquatics Conference Cup
- 2025–26 European Aquatics Challenger Cup
- 2025 European Aquatics Super Cup
- 2025–26 European Aquatics Women's Champions League
- 2025–26 European Aquatics Women's Euro Cup
- 2025–26 European Aquatics Women's Conference Cup
- 2025–26 European Aquatics Women's Challenger Cup
- 2025 European Aquatics Women's Super Cup

Reference
Matchday 1
Matchday 2
