= Madeleine Steere =

Australian water polo centre back (born 1996)

Personal information
- Full name: Madeleine Kate Steere
- Born: 15 September 1996 (age 29) Pascoe Vale, Melbourne, Australia
- Education: University of Michigan
- Height: 1.80 m (5 ft 11 in)

Sport
- Sport: Water polo
- Position: Centre back
- Shoots: Right-handed
- College team: Michigan Wolverines
Medal record
Women's water polo
Representing Australia
World Aquatics Championships
Bronze medal – third place	2019 Gwangju	Team
Summer Universiade
Gold medal – first place	2015 Gwangju	Team
Pan Pacific Games
Gold medal – first place	2012 Melbourne	U-16 Team

Madeleine Kate Steere (born 15 September 1996) is an Australian professional water polo centre back. She has represented numerous teams in her country, the University of Michigan college water polo team in the United States, and İzmir BB GSK in Turkey. Having represented Australia at youth level, she later made 67 appearances for the national team.

== Early life and education ==
Madeleine Kate Steere was born to Darren and Catherine Steere in Pascoe Vale, a suburb of Melbourne, Victoria, Australia, on 15 September 1996. She has a sister, Alexandra. She was educated in St Catherine's School in Melbourne's suburb of Toorak, and attended the University of Melbourne from 2015. She began studying at the University of Michigan in the United States in 2017; she left in 2019, but returned in 2022, majoring in biomolecular science.

== Career ==
=== Youth career ===
Steere started her sports career in her hometown at Essendon Water Polo Club in 2003, where she was a member until 2016. She played for Victorian Tigers Water Polo Club in 2011 and 2012, before transferring to Victorian Seals Club, where she played for the next four years in the Australian National Water Polo League (ANWPL). She was part of the team which won the silver medal at the Women's Water Polo Canada Cup 2013. In 2014, she was named "Water Polo Australia Junior Athlete of the Year". During the 2014 FINA Youth Water Polo World Championships in Spain, she was approached by the head coach of the Michigan Wolverines, and was invited to the United States to study at the University of Michigan and play for their water polo team. Accepting this offer in 2017, she spent two years playing in the NCAA Women's Water Polo Championship, being selected for the "All-American team" in 2018. She left the team in 2019, but returned in 2022 and resumed playing for Michigan.

As a Victorian Institute of Sport athlete, she was called up to Australia women's national youth team. In 2012, she took part at the Pan Pacific Games in Melbourne as the captain of the national U-16 team, which won the gold medal. She played in 2014 at the FINA Youth Water Polo World Championships in Madrid, Spain. In 2015, she participated at the FINA World Women's Junior Water Polo Championships, captaining the Australia U-18 team. She was part of the gold medal–winning national team at the 2015 Summer Universiade.

=== Club career ===
Steere is 1.80 m (5 ft 11 in) tall and plays right-handed in the centre back position. After returning home from the United States in 2019, she joined Australian Catholic University Cronulla Sharks Water Polo Club in the ANWPL. She was a member of Griffith University's Queensland Thunder, which won the ANWPL bronze medal in 2023. In September 2023, she moved to Turkey, and signed a deal with İzmir BB GSK. İzmir, which represented Turkey for the first time in Europe that season, became the champions of the 2023–24 LEN Women's Challenger Cup.

=== International career ===
As a university student in the United States, Steere was often named in the Australia national team roster: she eventually appeared in 67 international matches. She played at the World Aquatics Championships in 2017, where Australia finished eighth, and in 2019 when they won the bronze medal. She was part of the Australian team in Water Polo World League Super Final in 2017, 2018, and 2019; Australia came seventh in the first two competitions and fifth in the last.
