= 2025–26 European Aquatics Women's Challenger Cup =

Water polo sports season

European Aquatics Women's Challenger Cup
- 2025–26

Tournament information
- Sport: Water polo
- Date: Qualification Round I: 5–7 December 2025; Qualification Round II: 6–8 March 2026; Final classification: 21–22 March 2026; Final Four: 21–22 March 2026
- Tournament format(s): Round Robin and Knockout stage
- Teams: Qualification round I: 7 (Note: From 7 countries); Qualification round II: 4+7; Final classification: TBD; Final Four: 4 Total: 7+7 (from 9 countries)
- Website: Official website

Final positions
- Champion: (Turkey) Goztepe SK
- Runner-up: (Croatia) Jadran Split

The 2025–26 European Aquatics Women's Challenger Cup is the 3rd edition of the water polo competition organised by European Aquatics.

Starting this season, it acts as the fourth tier, due to the introduction of the European Aquatics Women's Conference Cup.

The winners of the European Aquatics Challenger Cup automatically qualify for next season's Conference Cup (if they choose to enter).

Izmir BSB Spor (now named Goztepe SK) are the defending champions. Goztepe SK defended and won their third title after beating Jadran Split 16–7 in the final in Cottonera.

== Rankings ==
The results were based on the results of the past four seasons.

- Associations 7–12 can have two teams ranked 4th and 5th qualify.
- Associations 13 and below can have four teams qualify.

Apart from the distribution based on the rankings, countries could have additional teams participating in the Challenger Cup, as noted below:

- (CC) – Additional teams dropping down from the Conference Cup

Rank	Association	Points	Teams	Notes
1	Spain	146,065	0	
2	Greece	127,360	0	
3	Hungary	91,557.5	0	
4	Italy	80,282.5	0	
5	Netherlands	30,965	0	
6	France	29,760	0	
7	Germany	12,870	1	
8	Turkey	11,295	1	+2 (CC)
9	Croatia	8,430	0	+1 (CC)
10	Portugal	6,940	0	+1 (CC)

Rank	Association	Points	Teams	Notes
11	Serbia	6,280	1	+1 (CC)
12	Malta	5,700	0	+2 (CC)
13	Israel	5,215	1	
14	(United Kingdom) Great Britain	4,930	1	
15	Czech Republic	1,830	1	
16	Slovakia	1,715	1	
17	Romania	1,610	0	
18	Sweden	1,060	0	
19	Bulgaria	770	0	

=== Ranking facts ===
Biggest rise
Pos	Team	Ori	New	Move
1	Turkey	13	8	▲ +5
2	Czech Republic	19	15	▲ +4
3	Israel	16	13	▲ +3

Biggest fall
Pos	Team	Ori	New	Move
1	Malta	10	12	▼ –2
1	Slovakia	14	16	▼ –2
2	France	6	7	▼ –1
2	Portugal	9	10	▼ –1
2	Sweden	17	18	▼ –1
2	Bulgaria	18	19	▼ –1

New entries
Romania

Leaving entries
Russia

== Teams ==
The teams finishing in fourth and fifth from national leagues ranked 7–12 and four teams from countries ranked 13 and below are permitted to enter.

Everyone who enters starts in the qualification round I.

Unlike last season, in the event that a club decides not to enter, the next best ranked team is not allowed to take their place.

=== Qualified teams ===
The labels in the parentheses show how each team qualified for the place of its starting round:

- 1st, 2nd, 3rd, 4th, etc: League positions of the previous season
- CC: Transferred from the Conference Cup
  - QR: Transferred from the Conference Cup qualification round I

Entry round	Teams			
Qualification round II	(Turkey) Goztepe SK (CC QR)	(Malta) San Giljan ASC (CC QR)	(Croatia) Jadran Split (CC QR)	(Serbia) ZVK Crvena Zvezda (CC QR)
Qualification round II	(Portugal) Clube Fluvial (CC QR)	(Turkey) Dalton Koleji SK (CC QR)	(Malta) Sirens ASC (CC QR)	
Qualification round I
Qualification round I	(Germany) SSV Esslingen (3rd)	~~(Turkey) ODTÜ SC~~ (Note: ODTÜ SC withdrew after the draw.) (4th)	(Turkey) Nevşehir Belediye SK (5th)	(Serbia) ZVU Partizan (3rd)
Qualification round I	(Israel) Hapoel Emek Hayarden (2nd)	(United Kingdom) Otter London (3rd)	(Czech Republic) AJ Fezko Strakonice (1st)	(Slovakia) Slavia UK Bratislava WP (1st)

=== Name changes ===
The following teams' names were changed during the season.

== Rounds and draw dates ==
=== Schedule ===
Phase	Draw date	Round date
Qualification round I	11 August 2025	14–16 November 2025
Qualification round II	8 December 2025	5–8 March 2026
Final classification	8 December 2025	5–8 March 2026
Final Four	8 December 2025	21–22 March 2026

== Qualification round I ==
The top two qualify for the next round. There was no draw, rather the groups were pre-selected for geographical reasons on 11 August 2025 in Zagreb, Croatia.

=== Group A ===
- 5–7 December 2025, Strakonice, Czech Republic.

Pos	Team	Pld	W	PSW	PSL	L	GF	GA	GD	Pts	Qualification	ESS	NEV	BRA	STR
1	(Germany) SSV Esslingen	3	2	0	0	1	34	26	+8	6 (Note: SSV Esslingen 12–7 Nevşehir Belediye SK)	Qualification round II	—	12–7	11–5	—
2	(Turkey) Nevşehir Belediye SK	3	2	0	0	1	39	37	+2	6	Qualification round II	—	—	17–11	—
3	(Slovakia) Slavia UK Bratislava WP	3	1	0	0	2	28	38	−10	3 (Note: Slavia UK Bratislava WP 12–10 AJ Fezko Strakonice)		—	—	—	—
4	(Czech Republic) AJ Fezko Strakonice (H)	3	1	0	0	2	38	38	0	3		14–11	14–15	10–12	—

Source: European Aquatics Women's Challenger Cup
(H) Host

=== Group B ===
- 5–7 December 2025, Belgrade, Serbia.

Pos	Team	Pld	W	PSW	PSL	L	GF	GA	GD	Pts	Qualification	OTT	HAP	PAR	ODTÜ
1	(United Kingdom) Otter London	2	2	0	0	0	38	23	+15	6	Qualification round II	—	10–9	—	—
2	(Israel) Hapoel Emek Hayarden	2	1	0	0	1	31	15	+16	3	Qualification round II	—	—	—	—
3	(Serbia) ZVU Partizan (H)	2	0	0	0	2	19	50	−31	0		14–28	5–22	—	—
4	(Turkey) ODTÜ SC	0	0	0	0	0	0	0	0	0	Withdrew	—	—	—	—

Source: European Aquatics Women's Challenger Cup
(H) Host

== Qualification round II ==
The top two qualify for the next round. The draw was held on 8 December 2025 in Zagreb, Croatia.

=== Group A ===
- 5–8 March 2026, Cottonera, Malta.

Pos	Team	Pld	W	PSW	PSL	L	GF	GA	GD	Pts	Qualification	ESS	POR	GIL	CRV	HAP
1	(Germany) SSV Esslingen	3	3	0	0	0	54	24	+30	9	Advance to Final Four	—	—	—	—	—
2	(Portugal) Clube Fluvial	3	2	0	0	1	51	31	+20	6	Advance to Final Four	7–14	—	—	21–8	—
3	(Malta) San Giljan ASC (H)	3	1	0	0	2	34	53	−19	3		8–18	9–23	—	17–12	—
4	(Serbia) ZVK Crvena Zvezda	3	0	0	0	3	29	60	−31	0		9–22	—	—	—	—
5	(Israel) Hapoel Emek Hayarden	0	0	0	0	0	0	0	0	0	Withdrew	—	—	—	—	—

Source: European Aquatics Women's Challenger Cup
(H) Host

=== Group B ===
- 5–8 March 2026, Izmit, Turkey.

Pos	Team	Pld	W	PSW	PSL	L	GF	GA	GD	Pts	Qualification	GOZ	JAD	NEV	SIR	OTT	DAL
1	(Turkey) Goztepe SK (H)	5	5	0	0	0	82	43	+39	15	Advance to Final Four	—	16–8	10–8	27–16	14–8	15–3
2	(Croatia) Jadran Split	5	4	0	0	1	72	52	+20	12	Advance to Final Four	—	—	—	—	16–10	20–8
3	(Turkey) Nevşehir Belediye SK	5	3	0	0	2	49	40	+9	9		—	10–11	—	11–5	19–8	—
4	(Malta) Sirens ASC	5	2	0	0	3	62	71	−9	6		—	7–17	—	—	—	—
5	(United Kingdom) Otter London	5	1	0	0	4	53	58	−5	3		—	—	—	8–11	—	18–8
6	(Turkey) Dalton Koleji SK	5	0	0	0	5	33	87	−54	0		—	—	6–11	8–23	—	—

Source: European Aquatics Women's Challenger Cup
(H) Host

== Final classification ==
- 20–22 March 2026, Cottonera, Malta.

Pos	Team	Pld	W	PSW	PSL	L	GF	GA	GD	Pts	SIR	BRA	OTT	GIL
5	(Malta) Sirens ASC	3	3	0	0	0	50	20	+30	9	—	18–7	16–9	—
6	(Slovakia) Slavia UK Bratislava WP	3	2	0	0	1	35	36	−1	6	—	—	—	—
7	(United Kingdom) Otter London	3	1	0	0	2	35	44	−9	3	—	11–14	—	—
8	(Malta) San Giljan ASC (H)	3	0	0	0	3	25	45	−20	0	4–16	7–14	14–15	—

Source: European Aquatics Women's Challenger Cup
(H) Host

== Final Four ==
The Final Four was held on 21–22 March 2026. The Cottonera Sports Complex in Cottonera, Malta, hosted the Final Four.

=== Bracket ===
Semi-finals
(Germany) SSV Esslingen	14 (6)
(Croatia) Jadran Split	14 (7)
(Turkey) Goztepe SK	25
(Portugal) Clube Fluvial	3

Final
(Croatia) Jadran Split	7
(Turkey) Goztepe SK	16
Third place
(Germany) SSV Esslingen	13
(Portugal) Clube Fluvial	10

=== Third place game ===
21 March 2026; 15:00	Report	SSV Esslingen (Germany)	13–10	(Portugal) Clube Fluvial	Cottonera Sports Complex, Cottonera; Referees: Theodora Michailidou (GRE), Dorottya Bors (HUN)
21 March 2026; 15:00	Report	Score by quarters: 5–3, 0–2, 4–4, 4–1			Cottonera Sports Complex, Cottonera; Referees: Theodora Michailidou (GRE), Dorottya Bors (HUN)
21 March 2026; 15:00	Report	Haas 4	Goals	Pereira 5	Cottonera Sports Complex, Cottonera; Referees: Theodora Michailidou (GRE), Dorottya Bors (HUN)

=== Final ===
22 March 2026; 16:45	Report	Jadran Split (Croatia)	7–16	(Turkey) Goztepe SK	Cottonera Sports Complex, Cottonera; Referees: Roberta Grillo (ITA), Ana Belen Perete Gonzalvo (ESP)
22 March 2026; 16:45	Report	Score by quarters: 0–6, 2–2, 2–3, 3–5			Cottonera Sports Complex, Cottonera; Referees: Roberta Grillo (ITA), Ana Belen Perete Gonzalvo (ESP)
22 March 2026; 16:45	Report	Butic, Jankovic 3	Goals	Kuş 5	Cottonera Sports Complex, Cottonera; Referees: Roberta Grillo (ITA), Ana Belen Perete Gonzalvo (ESP)

2025–26 European Aquatics Women's Challenger Cup Champions

Goztepe SK
Third title

== See also ==
- 2025–26 European Aquatics Champions League
- 2025–26 European Aquatics Euro Cup
- 2025–26 European Aquatics Conference Cup
- 2025–26 European Aquatics Challenger Cup
- 2025 European Aquatics Super Cup
- 2025–26 European Aquatics Women's Champions League
- 2025–26 European Aquatics Women's Euro Cup
- 2025–26 European Aquatics Women's Conference Cup
- 2025 European Aquatics Women's Super Cup
