= 2025–26 European Aquatics Women's Challenger Cup qualification round II =

- 2025–26

Tournament information
- Sport: Water polo
- Date: 5–8 March 2026
- Host(s): (Malta) Cottonera (Turkey) Izmit
- Teams: 11 (from 8 countries)
- Website: Official website

Tournament statistics
- Matches played: 21

The 2025–26 European Aquatics Women's Challenger Cup qualification round I is played between 5 and 8 March 2026 to determine the 4 teams advancing to the Final Four of the 2025–26 European Aquatics Women's Challenger Cup.

== Format ==
The 11 teams were place into two groups of five or six teams. In each group, teams will play against each other once in a round-robin format. The top two in each group advance to the next round.

Teams are ranked according to points (3 points for a win, 2 points for a penalty shootout win, 1 point for a penalty shootout loss, 0 points for a loss), and if tied on points, the following tiebreaking criteria are applied, in the order given, to determine the rankings:

- Points in head-to-head matches among tied teams;
- Goal difference in head-to-head matches among tied teams;
- Goals scored in head-to-head matches among tied teams;
- Goal difference in all group matches;
- Goals scored in all group matches.

== Draw ==
External videos
- 2025–26 European Aquatics Women's Challenger Cup qualification round II – Draw
- Draw

The draw was held on 8 December 2025 in Zagreb, Croatia. The clubs that in the same group in the previous round (in both Conference and Challenger Cup) could not be drawn against each other. For security reasons, Hapoel Emek Hayarden had to be placed into the group that was held in Malta. (H) indicates which clubs is hosting a group.

=== Seeding ===
The pots were decided by as follows

- Pot 1 consisted of the host teams
- Pot 2 consisted of the remaining teams dropping down from the Conference Cup
- Pot 3 consisted of the group winners of the Challenger Cup qualification round I
- Pot 4 consisted of the group runners-up of the Challenger Cup qualification round I

Key to colours
Teams advancing to Final Four

Pot 1
Team
(Malta) San Giljan ASC (H)
(Turkey) Goztepe SK (H)

Pot 2
Team
(Croatia) Jadran Split
(Portugal) Clube Fluvial
(Serbia) ZVK Crvena Zvezda
(Turkey) Dalton Koleji SK
(Malta) Sirens ASC

Pot 3
Team
(Germany) SSV Esslingen
(United Kingdom) Otter London

Pot 4
Team
(Turkey) Nevşehir Belediye SK
(Israel) Hapoel Emek Hayarden

== Groups ==
=== Group A ===
5–8 March 2026, Cottonera, Malta.

Pos	Team	Pld	W	PSW	PSL	L	GF	GA	GD	Pts	Qualification	ESS	POR	GIL	CRV	HAP
1	(Germany) SSV Esslingen	3	3	0	0	0	54	24	+30	9	Advance to Final Four	—	—	—	—	—
2	(Portugal) Clube Fluvial	3	2	0	0	1	51	31	+20	6	Advance to Final Four	7–14	—	—	21–8	—
3	(Malta) San Giljan ASC (H)	3	1	0	0	2	34	53	−19	3		8–18	9–23	—	17–12	—
4	(Serbia) ZVK Crvena Zvezda	3	0	0	0	3	29	60	−31	0		9–22	—	—	—	—
5	(Israel) Hapoel Emek Hayarden	0	0	0	0	0	0	0	0	0	Withdrew	—	—	—	—	—

Source: European Aquatics Women's Challenger Cup
(H) Host

5 March 2025; 18:00	Report	San Giljan ASC (Malta)	17–12	(Serbia) ZVK Crvena Zvezda	Cottonera Sports Complex, Cottonera; Referees: Maria Daskalopoulou (GRE), Jonathan Richards (GBR)
5 March 2025; 18:00	Report	Score by quarters: 5–2, 5–3, 2–2, 5–5			Cottonera Sports Complex, Cottonera; Referees: Maria Daskalopoulou (GRE), Jonathan Richards (GBR)
5 March 2025; 18:00	Report	Borg 9	Goals	Trbanos 4	Cottonera Sports Complex, Cottonera; Referees: Maria Daskalopoulou (GRE), Jonathan Richards (GBR)

5 March 2025; 19:30	Report	Clube Fluvial (Portugal)	7–14	(Germany) SSV Esslingen	Cottonera Sports Complex, Cottonera; Referees: Ana Belen Gonzalvo Perete (ESP), Sara Kontek (CRO)
5 March 2025; 19:30	Report	Score by quarters: 1–4, 2–2, 2–6, 2–2			Cottonera Sports Complex, Cottonera; Referees: Ana Belen Gonzalvo Perete (ESP), Sara Kontek (CRO)
5 March 2025; 19:30	Report	Mariani, Pereira 3	Goals	three players 3	Cottonera Sports Complex, Cottonera; Referees: Ana Belen Gonzalvo Perete (ESP), Sara Kontek (CRO)

6 March 2025; 11:30	Report	ZVK Crvena Zvezda (Serbia)	9–22	(Germany) SSV Esslingen	Cottonera Sports Complex, Cottonera; Referees: Ana Belen Gonzalvo Perete (ESP), Maria Daskalopoulou (GRE)
6 March 2025; 11:30	Report	Score by quarters: 3–7, 0–4, 3–6, 3–5			Cottonera Sports Complex, Cottonera; Referees: Ana Belen Gonzalvo Perete (ESP), Maria Daskalopoulou (GRE)
6 March 2025; 11:30	Report	Trbanos 4	Goals	Ntona Tsiaka 6	Cottonera Sports Complex, Cottonera; Referees: Ana Belen Gonzalvo Perete (ESP), Maria Daskalopoulou (GRE)

6 March 2026; 19:30	Report	Clube Fluvial (Portugal)	21–8	(Serbia) ZVK Crvena Zvezda	Cottonera Sports Complex, Cottonera; Referees: Jonathan Richards (GBR), Sara Kontek (CRO)
6 March 2026; 19:30	Report	Score by quarters: 7–0, 7–4, 3–1, 4–3			Cottonera Sports Complex, Cottonera; Referees: Jonathan Richards (GBR), Sara Kontek (CRO)
6 March 2026; 19:30	Report	Pereira 6	Goals	Jankovic 3	Cottonera Sports Complex, Cottonera; Referees: Jonathan Richards (GBR), Sara Kontek (CRO)

7 March 2026; 15:00	Report	San Giljan ASC (Malta)	9–23	(Portugal) Clube Fluvial	Cottonera Sports Complex, Cottonera; Referees: Sara Kontek (CRO), Jonathan Richards (GBR)
7 March 2026; 15:00	Report	Score by quarters: 4–6, 3–7, 0–7, 2–3			Cottonera Sports Complex, Cottonera; Referees: Sara Kontek (CRO), Jonathan Richards (GBR)
7 March 2026; 15:00	Report	three players 2	Goals	Pereira 9	Cottonera Sports Complex, Cottonera; Referees: Sara Kontek (CRO), Jonathan Richards (GBR)

8 March 2025; 10:00	Report	San Giljan ASC (Malta)	8–18	(Germany) SSV Esslingen	Cottonera Sports Complex, Cottonera; Referees: Ana Belen Gonzalvo Perete (ESP), Maria Daskalopoulou (GRE)
8 March 2025; 10:00	Report	Score by quarters: 3–6, 3–5, 1–3, 1–4			Cottonera Sports Complex, Cottonera; Referees: Ana Belen Gonzalvo Perete (ESP), Maria Daskalopoulou (GRE)
8 March 2025; 10:00	Report	Borg 5	Goals	Haas 4	Cottonera Sports Complex, Cottonera; Referees: Ana Belen Gonzalvo Perete (ESP), Maria Daskalopoulou (GRE)

==== Games involving Hapoel Emek Hayarden ====
6 March 2026; 10:00	Report	Hapoel Emek Hayarden (Israel)	–	(Portugal) Clube Fluvial	Cottonera Sports Complex, Cottonera
6 March 2026; 10:00	Report	Score by quarters: –, –, –, –			Cottonera Sports Complex, Cottonera

6 March 2026; 18:00	Report	San Giljan ASC (Malta)	–	(Israel) Hapoel Emek Hayarden	Cottonera Sports Complex, Cottonera
6 March 2026; 18:00	Report	Score by quarters: –, –, –, –			Cottonera Sports Complex, Cottonera

7 March 2026; 16:30	Report	Hapoel Emek Hayarden (Israel)	–	(Germany) SSV Esslingen	Cottonera Sports Complex, Cottonera
7 March 2026; 16:30	Report	Score by quarters: –, –, –, –			Cottonera Sports Complex, Cottonera

8 March 2026; 11:30	Report	ZVK Crvena Zvezda (Serbia)	–	(Israel) Hapoel Emek Hayarden	Cottonera Sports Complex, Cottonera
8 March 2026; 11:30	Report	Score by quarters: –, –, –, –			Cottonera Sports Complex, Cottonera

=== Group B ===
5–8 March 2026, Izmit, Turkey.

Pos	Team	Pld	W	PSW	PSL	L	GF	GA	GD	Pts	Qualification	GOZ	JAD	NEV	SIR	OTT	DAL
1	(Turkey) Goztepe SK (H)	5	5	0	0	0	82	43	+39	15	Advance to Final Four	—	16–8	10–8	27–16	14–8	15–3
2	(Croatia) Jadran Split	5	4	0	0	1	72	52	+20	12	Advance to Final Four	—	—	—	—	16–10	20–8
3	(Turkey) Nevşehir Belediye SK	5	3	0	0	2	49	40	+9	9		—	10–11	—	11–5	19–8	—
4	(Malta) Sirens ASC	5	2	0	0	3	62	71	−9	6		—	7–17	—	—	—	—
5	(United Kingdom) Otter London	5	1	0	0	4	53	58	−5	3		—	—	—	8–11	—	18–8
6	(Turkey) Dalton Koleji SK	5	0	0	0	5	33	87	−54	0		—	—	6–11	8–23	—	—

Source: European Aquatics Women's Challenger Cup
(H) Host

5 March 2026; 17:30	Report	Jadran Split (Croatia)	16–10	(United Kingdom) Otter London	Halkapınar Olympic Swimming Pool, Izmit; Referees: Bregje de Jong (NED), Alexandru Mustata (ROU)
5 March 2026; 17:30	Report	Score by quarters: 3–1, 2–2, 7–3, 4–4			Halkapınar Olympic Swimming Pool, Izmit; Referees: Bregje de Jong (NED), Alexandru Mustata (ROU)
5 March 2026; 17:30	Report	Jankovic 8	Goals	Snyder 4	Halkapınar Olympic Swimming Pool, Izmit; Referees: Bregje de Jong (NED), Alexandru Mustata (ROU)

5 March 2026; 19:00	Report	Dalton Koleji SK (Turkey)	6–11	(Turkey) Nevşehir Belediye SK	Halkapınar Olympic Swimming Pool, Izmit; Referees: Stasa Ilic (SRB), Csenge Varga (HUN)
5 March 2026; 19:00	Report	Score by quarters: 2–1, 1–1, 2–5, 1–4			Halkapınar Olympic Swimming Pool, Izmit; Referees: Stasa Ilic (SRB), Csenge Varga (HUN)
5 March 2026; 19:00	Report	Keremoglu 4	Goals	Molnar 6	Halkapınar Olympic Swimming Pool, Izmit; Referees: Stasa Ilic (SRB), Csenge Varga (HUN)

5 March 2026; 20:30	Report	Goztepe SK (Turkey)	27–16	(Malta) Sirens ASC	Halkapınar Olympic Swimming Pool, Izmit; Referees: Henning Schuermann (GER), Theodora Michailidou (GRE)
5 March 2026; 20:30	Report	Score by quarters: 8–5, 5–4, 7–2, 7–5			Halkapınar Olympic Swimming Pool, Izmit; Referees: Henning Schuermann (GER), Theodora Michailidou (GRE)
5 March 2026; 20:30	Report	Wright 8	Goals	Ferreira 6	Halkapınar Olympic Swimming Pool, Izmit; Referees: Henning Schuermann (GER), Theodora Michailidou (GRE)

6 March 2026; 17:30	Report	Nevşehir Belediye SK (Turkey)	11–5	(Malta) Sirens ASC	Halkapınar Olympic Swimming Pool, Izmit; Referees: Bregje de Jong (NED), Csenge Varga (HUN)
6 March 2026; 17:30	Report	Score by quarters: 2–1, 3–2, 4–1, 2–1			Halkapınar Olympic Swimming Pool, Izmit; Referees: Bregje de Jong (NED), Csenge Varga (HUN)
6 March 2026; 17:30	Report	Molnar 4	Goals	five players 1	Halkapınar Olympic Swimming Pool, Izmit; Referees: Bregje de Jong (NED), Csenge Varga (HUN)

6 March 2026; 19:00	Report	Jadran Split (Croatia)	20–8	(Turkey) Dalton Koleji SK	Halkapınar Olympic Swimming Pool, Izmit; Referees: Alexandru Mustata (ROU), Theodora Michailidou (GRE)
6 March 2026; 19:00	Report	Score by quarters: 7–0, 2–3, 5–3, 6–2			Halkapınar Olympic Swimming Pool, Izmit; Referees: Alexandru Mustata (ROU), Theodora Michailidou (GRE)
6 March 2026; 19:00	Report	Jankovic 6	Goals	Keremoglu 5	Halkapınar Olympic Swimming Pool, Izmit; Referees: Alexandru Mustata (ROU), Theodora Michailidou (GRE)

6 March 2026; 20:30	Report	Goztepe SK (Turkey)	14–8	(United Kingdom) Otter London	Halkapınar Olympic Swimming Pool, Izmit; Referees: Stasa Ilic (SRB), Henning Schuermann (GER)
6 March 2026; 20:30	Report	Score by quarters: 6–3, 2–1, 4–3, 2–1			Halkapınar Olympic Swimming Pool, Izmit; Referees: Stasa Ilic (SRB), Henning Schuermann (GER)
6 March 2026; 20:30	Report	Kuş 5	Goals	Meyer, Rogers 2	Halkapınar Olympic Swimming Pool, Izmit; Referees: Stasa Ilic (SRB), Henning Schuermann (GER)

7 March 2026; 09:30	Report	Otter London (United Kingdom)	8–11	(Malta) Sirens ASC	Halkapınar Olympic Swimming Pool, Izmit; Referees: Csenge Varga (HUN), Alexandru Mustata (ROU)
7 March 2026; 09:30	Report	Score by quarters: 3–3, 3–2, 1–4, 1–2			Halkapınar Olympic Swimming Pool, Izmit; Referees: Csenge Varga (HUN), Alexandru Mustata (ROU)
7 March 2026; 09:30	Report	Snyder 3	Goals	K. Agius 5	Halkapınar Olympic Swimming Pool, Izmit; Referees: Csenge Varga (HUN), Alexandru Mustata (ROU)

7 March 2026; 11:15	Report	Goztepe SK (Turkey)	15–3	(Turkey) Dalton Koleji SK	Halkapınar Olympic Swimming Pool, Izmit; Referees: Theodora Michailidou (GRE), Stasa Ilic (SRB)
7 March 2026; 11:15	Report	Score by quarters: 4–0, 7–0, 2–1, 2–2			Halkapınar Olympic Swimming Pool, Izmit; Referees: Theodora Michailidou (GRE), Stasa Ilic (SRB)
7 March 2026; 11:15	Report	Wright 5	Goals	Basimer 2	Halkapınar Olympic Swimming Pool, Izmit; Referees: Theodora Michailidou (GRE), Stasa Ilic (SRB)

7 March 2026; 13:00	Report	Nevşehir Belediye SK (Turkey)	10–11	(Croatia) Jadran Split	Halkapınar Olympic Swimming Pool, Izmit; Referees: Bregje de Jong (NED), Henning Schuermann (GER)
7 March 2026; 13:00	Report	Score by quarters: 0–3, 2–4, 4–3, 4–1			Halkapınar Olympic Swimming Pool, Izmit; Referees: Bregje de Jong (NED), Henning Schuermann (GER)
7 March 2026; 13:00	Report	Serzhantova 4	Goals	Jankovic 5	Halkapınar Olympic Swimming Pool, Izmit; Referees: Bregje de Jong (NED), Henning Schuermann (GER)

7 March 2026; 17:30	Report	Dalton Koleji SK (Turkey)	8–23	(Malta) Sirens ASC	Halkapınar Olympic Swimming Pool, Izmit; Referees: Alexandru Mustata (ROU), Stasa Ilic (SRB)
7 March 2026; 17:30	Report	Score by quarters: 2–5, 3–6, 2–4, 1–8			Halkapınar Olympic Swimming Pool, Izmit; Referees: Alexandru Mustata (ROU), Stasa Ilic (SRB)
7 March 2026; 17:30	Report	Basimer, Keremoglu 3	Goals	Amato, K. Agius 6	Halkapınar Olympic Swimming Pool, Izmit; Referees: Alexandru Mustata (ROU), Stasa Ilic (SRB)

7 March 2026; 19:00	Report	Goztepe SK (Turkey)	16–8	(Croatia) Jadran Split	Halkapınar Olympic Swimming Pool, Izmit; Referees: Bregje de Jong (NED), Theodora Michailidou (GRE)
7 March 2026; 19:00	Report	Score by quarters: 4–3, 5–0, 5–2, 2–3			Halkapınar Olympic Swimming Pool, Izmit; Referees: Bregje de Jong (NED), Theodora Michailidou (GRE)
7 March 2026; 19:00	Report	Mimides 4	Goals	Jankovic, Srhoj 2	Halkapınar Olympic Swimming Pool, Izmit; Referees: Bregje de Jong (NED), Theodora Michailidou (GRE)

7 March 2026; 20:30	Report	Nevşehir Belediye SK (Turkey)	19–8	(United Kingdom) Otter London	Halkapınar Olympic Swimming Pool, Izmit; Referees: Henning Schuermann (GER), Csenge Varga (HUN)
7 March 2026; 20:30	Report	Score by quarters: 2–2, 2–2, 4–2, 1–2			Halkapınar Olympic Swimming Pool, Izmit; Referees: Henning Schuermann (GER), Csenge Varga (HUN)
7 March 2026; 20:30	Report	Molnar 5	Goals	Meyer 3	Halkapınar Olympic Swimming Pool, Izmit; Referees: Henning Schuermann (GER), Csenge Varga (HUN)

8 March 2026; 10:00	Report	Sirens ASC (Malta)	7–17	(Croatia) Jadran Split	Halkapınar Olympic Swimming Pool, Izmit; Referees: Theodora Michailidou (GRE), Csenge Varga (HUN)
8 March 2026; 10:00	Report	Score by quarters: 0–6, 2–2, 2–4, 3–5			Halkapınar Olympic Swimming Pool, Izmit; Referees: Theodora Michailidou (GRE), Csenge Varga (HUN)
8 March 2026; 10:00	Report	Rezende 3	Goals	Jankovic 9	Halkapınar Olympic Swimming Pool, Izmit; Referees: Theodora Michailidou (GRE), Csenge Varga (HUN)

8 March 2026; 11:30	Report	Otter London (United Kingdom)	18–8	(Turkey) Dalton Koleji SK	Halkapınar Olympic Swimming Pool, Izmit; Referees: Henning Schuermann (GER), Alexandru Mustata (ROU)
8 March 2026; 11:30	Report	Score by quarters: 5–3, 2–3, 5–1, 6–1			Halkapınar Olympic Swimming Pool, Izmit; Referees: Henning Schuermann (GER), Alexandru Mustata (ROU)
8 March 2026; 11:30	Report	Lawson 4	Goals	Keremoglu 3	Halkapınar Olympic Swimming Pool, Izmit; Referees: Henning Schuermann (GER), Alexandru Mustata (ROU)

8 March 2026; 13:00	Report	Goztepe SK (Turkey)	10–8	(Turkey) Nevşehir Belediye SK	Halkapınar Olympic Swimming Pool, Izmit; Referees: Bregje de Jong (NED), Stasa Ilic (SRB)
8 March 2026; 13:00	Report	Score by quarters: 1–3, 3–1, 6–2, 0–2			Halkapınar Olympic Swimming Pool, Izmit; Referees: Bregje de Jong (NED), Stasa Ilic (SRB)
8 March 2026; 13:00	Report	Wright 3	Goals	Molnar 3	Halkapınar Olympic Swimming Pool, Izmit; Referees: Bregje de Jong (NED), Stasa Ilic (SRB)

== See also ==
- 2025–26 European Aquatics Champions League
- 2025–26 European Aquatics Euro Cup
- 2025–26 European Aquatics Conference Cup
- 2025–26 European Aquatics Challenger Cup
- 2025 European Aquatics Super Cup
- 2025–26 European Aquatics Women's Champions League
- 2025–26 European Aquatics Women's Euro Cup
- 2025–26 European Aquatics Women's Conference Cup
- 2025–26 European Aquatics Women's Challenger Cup
- 2025 European Aquatics Women's Super Cup

Reference
Matchday 1
Matchday 2
Matchday 3
Matchday 4
