= 2025–26 European Aquatics Women's Challenger Cup final classification =

Tournament information
- Sport: Water polo
- Date: 20–22 March 2026
- Host: (Malta) Cottonera
- Teams: 4 (from 4 countries)
- Website: Official website

Tournament statistics
- Matches played: 6

The 2025–26 European Aquatics Women's Challenger Cup final classification was played to decide the final standing of the 2025–26 European Aquatics Women's Challenger Cup and give clubs of the level more exposure on the European scene. The event was held in conjunction with the Final Four.

== Format ==
In each group, teams will play against each other once in a round-robin format.

Teams are ranked according to points (3 points for a win, 2 points for a penalty shootout win, 1 point for a penalty shootout loss, 0 points for a loss), and if tied on points, the following tiebreaking criteria are applied, in the order given, to determine the rankings:

- Points in head-to-head matches among tied teams;
- Goal difference in head-to-head matches among tied teams;
- Goals scored in head-to-head matches among tied teams;
- Goal difference in all group matches;
- Goals scored in all group matches.

== Group composition ==
The eliminated teams are allowed to take part, although Dalton Koleji SK, Nevşehir Belediye SK, ZVK Crvena Zvezda, ZVU Partizan, Hapoel Emek Hayarden and AJ Fezko Strakonice declined to enter.

- QR1: Eliminated teams from Qualification round I
- QR2: Eliminated teams from Qualification round II

Teams
(Slovakia) Slavia UK Bratislava WP (QR1)
(United Kingdom) Otter London (QR2)
(Malta) San Giljan ASC (QR2)
(Malta) Sirens ASC (QR2)

== Group ==
- 20–22 March 2026, Cottonera, Malta.

Pos	Team	Pld	W	PSW	PSL	L	GF	GA	GD	Pts	SIR	BRA	OTT	GIL
5	(Malta) Sirens ASC	3	3	0	0	0	50	20	+30	9	—	18–7	16–9	—
6	(Slovakia) Slavia UK Bratislava WP	3	2	0	0	1	35	36	−1	6	—	—	—	—
7	(United Kingdom) Otter London	3	1	0	0	2	35	44	−9	3	—	11–14	—	—
8	(Malta) San Giljan ASC (H)	3	0	0	0	3	25	45	−20	0	4–16	7–14	14–15	—

Source: European Aquatics Women's Challenger Cup
(H) Host

20 March 2026; 16:00	Report	Sirens ASC (Malta)	16–9	(United Kingdom) Otter London	Cottonera Sports Complex, Cottonera; Referees: Federica Rizzo (ITA), Jelena Katusic (CRO)
20 March 2026; 16:00	Report	Score by quarters: 5–2, 3–3, 5–2, 3–2			Cottonera Sports Complex, Cottonera; Referees: Federica Rizzo (ITA), Jelena Katusic (CRO)
20 March 2026; 16:00	Report	Rezende 6	Goals	Lawson 3	Cottonera Sports Complex, Cottonera; Referees: Federica Rizzo (ITA), Jelena Katusic (CRO)

20 March 2026; 17:45	Report	San Giljan ASC (Malta)	7–14	(Slovakia) Slavia UK Bratislava WP	Cottonera Sports Complex, Cottonera; Referees: Rosa Fabregas Fernandez (ESP), Csenge Varga (HUN)
20 March 2026; 17:45	Report	Score by quarters: 3–2, 3–4, 0–3, 1–5			Cottonera Sports Complex, Cottonera; Referees: Rosa Fabregas Fernandez (ESP), Csenge Varga (HUN)
20 March 2026; 17:45	Report	Borg 4	Goals	Kissova 7	Cottonera Sports Complex, Cottonera; Referees: Rosa Fabregas Fernandez (ESP), Csenge Varga (HUN)

21 March 2026; 15:00	Report	Sirens ASC (Malta)	18–7	(Slovakia) Slavia UK Bratislava WP	Cottonera Sports Complex, Cottonera; Referees: Rosa Fabregas Fernandez (ESP), Jelena Katusic (CRO)
21 March 2026; 15:00	Report	Score by quarters: 5–2, 6–2, 4–1, 3–2			Cottonera Sports Complex, Cottonera; Referees: Rosa Fabregas Fernandez (ESP), Jelena Katusic (CRO)
21 March 2026; 15:00	Report	Rezende 6	Goals	three players 2	Cottonera Sports Complex, Cottonera; Referees: Rosa Fabregas Fernandez (ESP), Jelena Katusic (CRO)

21 March 2026; 16:45	Report	San Giljan ASC (Malta)	14–15	(United Kingdom) Otter London	Cottonera Sports Complex, Cottonera; Referees: Csenge Varga (HUN), Federica Rizzo (ITA)
21 March 2026; 16:45	Report	Score by quarters: 1–3, 6–5, 4–4, 3–3			Cottonera Sports Complex, Cottonera; Referees: Csenge Varga (HUN), Federica Rizzo (ITA)
21 March 2026; 16:45	Report	Borg 7	Goals	four players 3	Cottonera Sports Complex, Cottonera; Referees: Csenge Varga (HUN), Federica Rizzo (ITA)

22 March 2026; 10:15	Report	Otter London (United Kingdom)	11–14	(Slovakia) Slavia UK Bratislava WP	Cottonera Sports Complex, Cottonera; Referees: Csenge Varga (HUN), Jelena Katusic (CRO)
22 March 2026; 10:15	Report	Score by quarters: 2–1, 4–4, 2–5, 3–4			Cottonera Sports Complex, Cottonera; Referees: Csenge Varga (HUN), Jelena Katusic (CRO)
22 March 2026; 10:15	Report	Bull 3	Goals	Kiernoszova 5	Cottonera Sports Complex, Cottonera; Referees: Csenge Varga (HUN), Jelena Katusic (CRO)

22 March 2026; 12:15	Report	San Giljan ASC (Malta)	4–16	(Malta) Sirens ASC	Cottonera Sports Complex, Cottonera; Referees: Federica Rizzo (ITA), Rosa Fabregas Fernandez (ESP)
22 March 2026; 12:15	Report	Score by quarters: 0–4, 1–7, 1–3, 2–2			Cottonera Sports Complex, Cottonera; Referees: Federica Rizzo (ITA), Rosa Fabregas Fernandez (ESP)
22 March 2026; 12:15	Report	Borg 2	Goals	Agius, Perici Ferrante 5	Cottonera Sports Complex, Cottonera; Referees: Federica Rizzo (ITA), Rosa Fabregas Fernandez (ESP)

== See also ==
- 2025–26 European Aquatics Champions League
- 2025–26 European Aquatics Euro Cup
- 2025–26 European Aquatics Conference Cup
- 2025–26 European Aquatics Challenger Cup
- 2025 European Aquatics Super Cup
- 2025–26 European Aquatics Women's Champions League
- 2025–26 European Aquatics Women's Euro Cup
- 2025–26 European Aquatics Women's Conference Cup
- 2025–26 European Aquatics Women's Challenger Cup
- 2025 European Aquatics Women's Super Cup

Reference
Report
