= 2025–26 European Aquatics Women's Challenger Cup qualification round I =

- 2025–26

Tournament information
- Sport: Water polo
- Date: 5–7 December 2025
- Host(s): (Czech Republic) Strakonice (Serbia) Belgrade
- Teams: 7 (from 7 countries)
- Website: Official website

Tournament statistics
- Matches played: 9

The 2025–26 European Aquatics Women's Challenger Cup qualification round I is played between 5 and 7 December 2025 to determine the 4 teams advancing to the qualification round II of the 2025–26 European Aquatics Women's Challenger Cup.

== Format ==
The 7 teams were place into two groups of four teams. In each group, teams will play against each other once in a round-robin format. The top two in each group advance to the next round.

Teams are ranked according to points (3 points for a win, 2 points for a penalty shootout win, 1 point for a penalty shootout loss, 0 points for a loss), and if tied on points, the following tiebreaking criteria are applied, in the order given, to determine the rankings:

- Points in head-to-head matches among tied teams;
- Goal difference in head-to-head matches among tied teams;
- Goals scored in head-to-head matches among tied teams;
- Goal difference in all group matches;
- Goals scored in all group matches.

== Group composition ==
External videos
- 2025–26 European Aquatics Women's Challenger Cup qualification round I – Draw
- Draw

There was no draw, rather the groups were pre-selected for geographical reasons on 11 August 2025 in Zagreb, Croatia. (H) indicates which clubs is hosting a group.

Key to colours
Teams advancing to qualification round II

Pot 1
| Team | Rank | Points |
|---|---|---|
| (Czech Republic) AJ Fezko Strakonice (H) | 47 | 1,830 |
| (Germany) SSV Esslingen | 56 | 1,060 |
| (Turkey) Nevşehir Belediye SK | N/A | |
| (Slovakia) Slavia UK Bratislava WP | N/A | |

Pot 2
| Team | Rank | Points |
|---|---|---|
| (Serbia) ZVU Partizan (H) | N/A | |
| (United Kingdom) Otter London | 41 | 2,550 |
| (Israel) Hapoel Emek Hayarden | 55 | 1,060 |
| ~~(Turkey) ODTÜ SC~~ | 59 | 560 |

== Groups ==
=== Group A ===
5–7 December 2025, Strakonice, Czech Republic.

| Pos | Team | Pld | W | PSW | PSL | L | GF | GA | GD | Pts | Qualification | ESS | NEV | BRA | STR |
|---|---|---|---|---|---|---|---|---|---|---|---|---|---|---|---|
| 1 | (Germany) SSV Esslingen | 3 | 2 | 0 | 0 | 1 | 34 | 26 | +8 | 6 (Note: SSV Esslingen 12–7 Nevşehir Belediye SK) | Qualification round II | — | 12–7 | 11–5 | — |
| 2 | (Turkey) Nevşehir Belediye SK | 3 | 2 | 0 | 0 | 1 | 39 | 37 | +2 | 6 | Qualification round II | — | — | 17–11 | — |
| 3 | (Slovakia) Slavia UK Bratislava WP | 3 | 1 | 0 | 0 | 2 | 28 | 38 | −10 | 3 (Note: Slavia UK Bratislava WP 12–10 AJ Fezko Strakonice) | | — | — | — | — |
| 4 | (Czech Republic) AJ Fezko Strakonice (H) | 3 | 1 | 0 | 0 | 2 | 38 | 38 | 0 | 3 | | 14–11 | 14–15 | 10–12 | — |

Source: European Aquatics Women's Challenger Cup
(H) Host
Notes:

| 5 December 2025; 17:00 | Report | Nevşehir Belediye SK (Turkey) | 17–11 | (Slovakia) Slavia UK Bratislava WP | Strakonice Pool, Strakonice; Referees: Jonathan Richards (GBR), Jelena Katusic (CRO) |
| 5 December 2025; 17:00 | Report | Score by quarters: 4–1, 4–2, 8–3, 1–5 | | | Strakonice Pool, Strakonice; Referees: Jonathan Richards (GBR), Jelena Katusic (CRO) |
| 5 December 2025; 17:00 | Report | Molnar 7 | Goals | Garancovska 4 | Strakonice Pool, Strakonice; Referees: Jonathan Richards (GBR), Jelena Katusic (CRO) |

| 5 December 2025; 19:00 | Report | AJ Fezko Strakonice (Czech Republic) | 14–11 | (Germany) SSV Esslingen | Strakonice Pool, Strakonice; Referees: Stefana Stefanovic (SRB), Ferenc Miklos Toth (ROU) |
| 5 December 2025; 19:00 | Report | Score by quarters: 2–4, 3–3, 6–2, 3–2 | | | Strakonice Pool, Strakonice; Referees: Stefana Stefanovic (SRB), Ferenc Miklos Toth (ROU) |
| 5 December 2025; 19:00 | Report | Votavova 4 | Goals | four players 2 | Strakonice Pool, Strakonice; Referees: Stefana Stefanovic (SRB), Ferenc Miklos Toth (ROU) |

| 6 December 2025; 17:00 | Report | SSV Esslingen (Germany) | 12–7 | (Turkey) Nevşehir Belediye SK | Strakonice Pool, Strakonice; Referees: Jelena Katusic (CRO), Stefana Stefanovic (SRB) |
| 6 December 2025; 17:00 | Report | Score by quarters: 4–1, 1–1, 4–2, 3–3 | | | Strakonice Pool, Strakonice; Referees: Jelena Katusic (CRO), Stefana Stefanovic (SRB) |
| 6 December 2025; 17:00 | Report | Ntona Tsiaka 5 | Goals | Loudi 3 | Strakonice Pool, Strakonice; Referees: Jelena Katusic (CRO), Stefana Stefanovic (SRB) |

| 6 December 2025; 19:00 | Report | AJ Fezko Strakonice (Czech Republic) | 10–12 | (Slovakia) Slavia UK Bratislava WP | Strakonice Pool, Strakonice; Referees: Ferenc Miklos Toth (ROU), Jonathan Richards (GBR) |
| 6 December 2025; 19:00 | Report | Score by quarters: 2–2, 2–6, 4–3, 2–1 | | | Strakonice Pool, Strakonice; Referees: Ferenc Miklos Toth (ROU), Jonathan Richards (GBR) |
| 6 December 2025; 19:00 | Report | Busauerova 4 | Goals | Peckova 6 | Strakonice Pool, Strakonice; Referees: Ferenc Miklos Toth (ROU), Jonathan Richards (GBR) |

| 7 December 2025; 10:00 | Report | SSV Esslingen (Germany) | 11–5 | (Slovakia) Slavia UK Bratislava WP | Strakonice Pool, Strakonice; Referees: Stefana Stefanovic (SRB), Jonathan Richards (GBR) |
| 7 December 2025; 10:00 | Report | Score by quarters: 2–1, 5–0, 1–3, 3–1 | | | Strakonice Pool, Strakonice; Referees: Stefana Stefanovic (SRB), Jonathan Richards (GBR) |
| 7 December 2025; 10:00 | Report | Haas 5 | Goals | five players 1 | Strakonice Pool, Strakonice; Referees: Stefana Stefanovic (SRB), Jonathan Richards (GBR) |

| 7 December 2025; 12:00 | Report | AJ Fezko Strakonice (Czech Republic) | 14–15 | (Turkey) Nevşehir Belediye SK | Strakonice Pool, Strakonice; Referees: Jelena Katusic (CRO), Ferenc Miklos Toth (ROU) |
| 7 December 2025; 12:00 | Report | Score by quarters: 5–5, 4–4, 3–3, 2–3 | | | Strakonice Pool, Strakonice; Referees: Jelena Katusic (CRO), Ferenc Miklos Toth (ROU) |
| 7 December 2025; 12:00 | Report | Hola 4 | Goals | Molnar 9 | Strakonice Pool, Strakonice; Referees: Jelena Katusic (CRO), Ferenc Miklos Toth (ROU) |

=== Group B ===
5–7 December 2025, Belgrade, Serbia.

| Pos | Team | Pld | W | PSW | PSL | L | GF | GA | GD | Pts | Qualification | OTT | HAP | PAR | ODTÜ |
|---|---|---|---|---|---|---|---|---|---|---|---|---|---|---|---|
| 1 | (United Kingdom) Otter London | 2 | 2 | 0 | 0 | 0 | 38 | 23 | +15 | 6 | Qualification round II | — | 10–9 | — | — |
| 2 | (Israel) Hapoel Emek Hayarden | 2 | 1 | 0 | 0 | 1 | 31 | 15 | +16 | 3 | Qualification round II | — | — | — | — |
| 3 | (Serbia) ZVU Partizan (H) | 2 | 0 | 0 | 0 | 2 | 19 | 50 | −31 | 0 | | 14–28 | 5–22 | — | — |
| 4 | (Turkey) ODTÜ SC | 0 | 0 | 0 | 0 | 0 | 0 | 0 | 0 | 0 | Withdrew | — | — | — | — |

Source: European Aquatics Women's Challenger Cup
(H) Host

| 5 December 2025; 21:00 | Report | ZVU Partizan (Serbia) | 14–28 | (United Kingdom) Otter London | Sport Center Banjica, Belgrade; Referees: Karel Dvoracek (CZE), Paula Riehn (GER) |
| 5 December 2025; 21:00 | Report | Score by quarters: 4–4, 2–7, 5–9, 3–8 | | | Sport Center Banjica, Belgrade; Referees: Karel Dvoracek (CZE), Paula Riehn (GER) |
| 5 December 2025; 21:00 | Report | Cvetkovic 4 | Goals | Rogers 5 | Sport Center Banjica, Belgrade; Referees: Karel Dvoracek (CZE), Paula Riehn (GER) |

| 6 December 2025; 19:45 | Report | Otter London (United Kingdom) | 10–9 | (Israel) Hapoel Emek Hayarden | Sport Center Banjica, Belgrade; Referees: Paula Riehn (GER), Federica Rizzo (ITA) |
| 6 December 2025; 19:45 | Report | Score by quarters: 3–2, 0–0, 2–4, 5–3 | | | Sport Center Banjica, Belgrade; Referees: Paula Riehn (GER), Federica Rizzo (ITA) |
| 6 December 2025; 19:45 | Report | Rogers 6 | Goals | Dorfman, Vaizberg 3 | Sport Center Banjica, Belgrade; Referees: Paula Riehn (GER), Federica Rizzo (ITA) |

| 7 December 2025; 09:45 | Report | ZVU Partizan (Serbia) | 5–22 | (Israel) Hapoel Emek Hayarden | Sport Center Banjica, Belgrade; Referees: Federica Rizzo (ITA), Karel Dvoracek (CZE) |
| 7 December 2025; 09:45 | Report | Score by quarters: 0–7, 2–4, 2–6, 1–5 | | | Sport Center Banjica, Belgrade; Referees: Federica Rizzo (ITA), Karel Dvoracek (CZE) |
| 7 December 2025; 09:45 | Report | Ilic 2 | Goals | Raz 5 | Sport Center Banjica, Belgrade; Referees: Federica Rizzo (ITA), Karel Dvoracek (CZE) |

== See also ==
- 2025–26 European Aquatics Champions League
- 2025–26 European Aquatics Euro Cup
- 2025–26 European Aquatics Conference Cup
- 2025–26 European Aquatics Challenger Cup
- 2025 European Aquatics Super Cup
- 2025–26 European Aquatics Women's Champions League
- 2025–26 European Aquatics Women's Euro Cup
- 2025–26 European Aquatics Women's Conference Cup
- 2025–26 European Aquatics Women's Challenger Cup
- 2025 European Aquatics Women's Super Cup

Reference
Matchday 1
Matchday 2
Matchday 3
