= 2023–24 LEN Women's Challenger Cup =

European water polo tournament

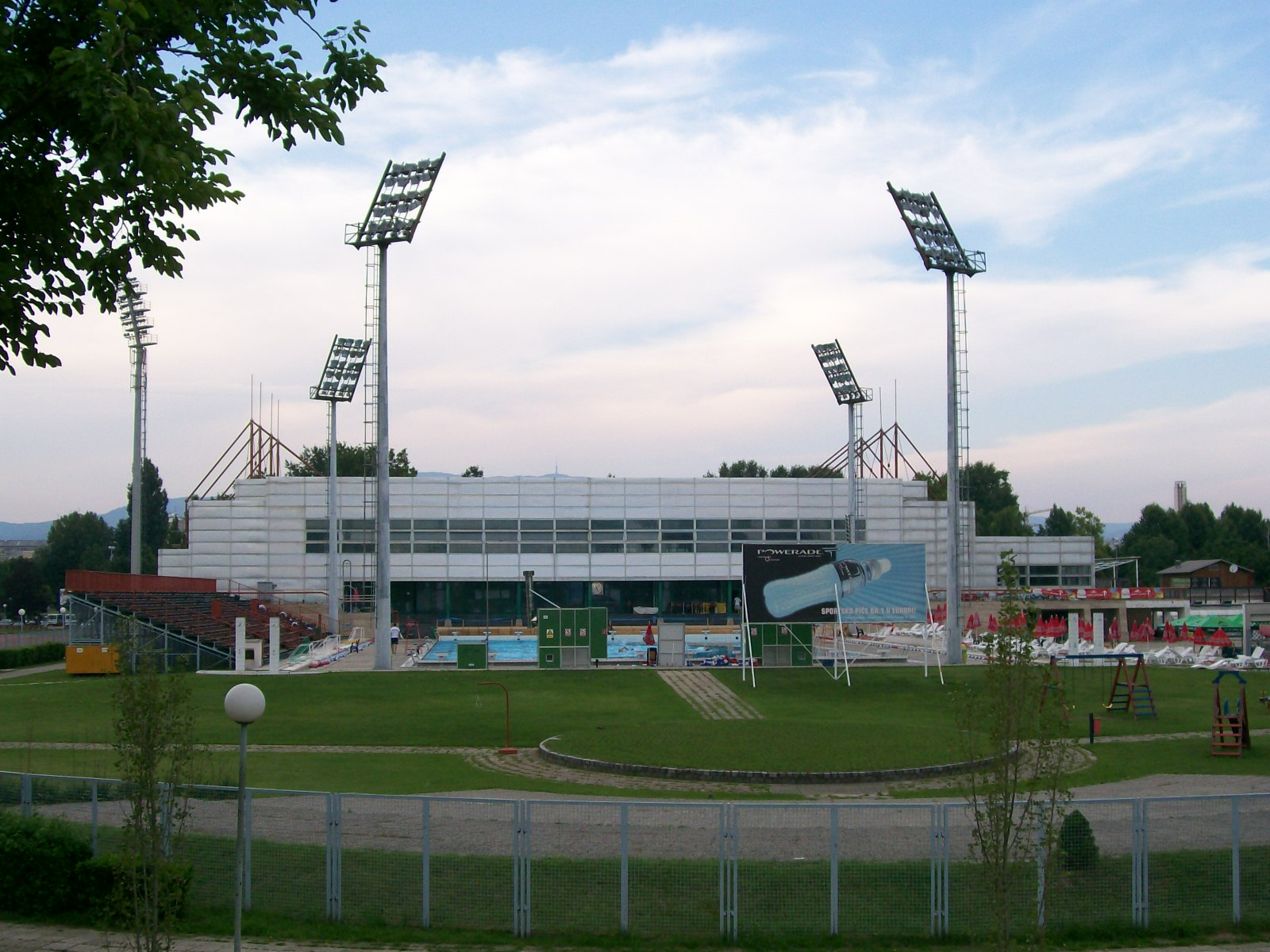
- The Bazen Mladost in Zagreb hosted the Final six.
- League: LEN Women's Challenger Cup
- Sport: Water polo
- Duration: 19 October 2023 – 26 November 2023
- Games: 35
- Teams: 14
- Finals champions: (Turkey) Izmir BB GSK (1st title)
- Runners-up: (Serbia) ZVK Crvena Zvezda

LEN Women's Challenger Cup seasons
- 2024–25

The 2023–24 LEN Women's Challenger Cup was the inaugural edition of the new water polo competition organised by the Ligue Européenne de Natation (LEN). It acted as the third tier, below the LEN Women's Champions League and the LEN Women's Euro Cup.

Izmir BB GSK won the inaugural competition, beating ZVK Crvena Zvezda 10–9 in the final. Izmir BB GSK became the first Turkish club to win a European club water polo competition.

== Introduction ==
A year after the men's competition started, LEN decided to inaugurate a women's version. Similar to the men's tournament, the LEN Women's Challenger Cup was designed to help developing countries and clubs grow and play more European club games.

== Format ==
15 teams are separated into three groups of five. Each group is held at one club. The top 2 from each group advance to the Final Six. The final six, the six teams club are pooled into two groups of three where the two group winners advance to the final, while the two runners up play for third. Like the previous round, the final six is held at one club.

== Rankings ==
Only teams below the top 6 can enter the competition.

Rank	Association	Points	Teams
1	Spain	105,597.5	0
2	Greece	91,125	0
3	Hungary	84,842.5	0
4	Italy	76,410	0
5	France	24,127.5	0
6	Russia	53.38	0
7	Netherlands	49.300	0
8	Slovakia	5,145	0
9	Germany	4,620	0
9	Portugal	4,620	2
11	Malta	3,940	1
12	Israel	2,500	0 (Note: Israel originally entered a club in the competition, but withdrew just before the tournament started)
13	Croatia	1,012.5	2

Rank	Association	Points	Teams
NR	Bulgaria	0	1
NR	Czech Republic	0	1
NR	(United Kingdom) Great Britain	0	2
NR	Serbia	0	2
NR	Sweden	0	1
NR	Turkey	0	2

== Teams ==
Only countries below the top 6 in the LEN women's club rankings can enter teams into this competition.

Participating teams
(Bulgaria) Kvt Lokomotiv-N.Nanov	(Czech Republic) Asten Johnson Fezko Strakonice	(Croatia) ŽAVK Mladost	(Croatia) Jadran Split
(Israel) ~~Hapoel Emek Hayarden~~	(United Kingdom) Otter Swimming Club	(United Kingdom) City Of Manchester Water Polo Club	(Malta) Sirens ASC
(Portugal) Sport Lisboa e Benfica	(Portugal) Clube Fluvial Portuense	(Serbia) VK Vojvodina	(Serbia) ZVK Crvena Zvezda
(Sweden) Järfälla	(Turkey) Izmir BB GSK	(Turkey) ODTU Sport Club	

== Schedule ==
=== Rounds and dates ===
Phase	Round date
Qualification round	19–22 October 2023
Final six	24–26 November 2023

== Draw ==
The draw was on 11 September 2023. H indicates which club is hosting the groups. Teams in bold advanced to the final six. The seeding was decided by as follows:

- The new LEN club rankings.
- LEN country club rankings.
- LEN women's national team rankings.

Pot 1	Pot 2	Pot 3	Pot 4	Pot 5
(Malta) Sirens ASC **(Croatia) ŽAVK Mladost** **(Portugal) Sport Lisboa e Benfica**	**(Portugal) Clube Fluvial Portuense** (Israel) ~~Hapoel Emek Hayarden~~ **(Croatia) Jadran Split**	**(Serbia) ZVK Crvena Zvezda** (Serbia) VK Vojvodina **(H)** **(Turkey) Izmir BB GSK**	(Turkey) ODTU Sport Club (Czech Republic) Asten Johnson Fezko Strakonice **(H)** (United Kingdom) Otter Swimming Club	(United Kingdom) City Of Manchester Water Polo Club (Bulgaria) Kvt Lokomotiv-N.Nanov **(H)** (Sweden) Järfälla

== Qualification round ==
=== Group A ===
Held in Novi Sad, Serbia

Pos	Team	Pld	W	PSW	PSL	L	GF	GA	GD	Pts	Qualification	(Croatia) JAD	(Croatia) MLA	(Serbia) VOJ	(United Kingdom) MAN	(Turkey) ODT
1	(Croatia) Jadran Split	4	3	0	0	1	67	45	+22	**9 (Note: Head-to-head goal difference: Jadran Split +4, ŽAVK Mladost −2, VK Vojvodina −2. Head-to-head result: VK Vojvodina 11–14 ŽAVK Mladost.)**	Final six	—	17–12	—	12–10	26–10
2	(Croatia) ŽAVK Mladost	4	3	0	0	1	78	37	+41	**9**	Final six	—	—	—	16–8	—
3	(Serbia) VK Vojvodina (H)	4	3	0	0	1	56	38	+18	**9**		13–12	11–14	—	14–7	18–5
4	(United Kingdom) City Of Manchester Water Polo Club	4	1	0	0	3	42	47	−5	**3**		—	—	—	—	17–5
5	(Turkey) ODTU Sport Club	4	0	0	0	4	21	97	−76	**0**		—	1–36	—	—	—

Source: Report
(H) Host

=== Group B ===
Held in Strakonice, Czech Republic

Pos	Team	Pld	W	PSW	PSL	L	GF	GA	GD	Pts	Qualification	(Turkey) IZM	(Portugal) BEN	(Sweden) JÄR	(Czech Republic) STR	(Israel) HAP
1	(Turkey) Izmir BB GSK	3	3	0	0	0	64	24	+40	**9**	Final six	—	—	21–3	—	Canc.
2	(Portugal) Sport Lisboa e Benfica	3	2	0	0	1	44	41	+3	**6**	Final six	10–19	—	17–9	—	Canc.
3	(Sweden) Järfälla	3	1	0	0	2	25	50	−25	**3**		—	—	—	—	Canc.
4	(Czech Republic) Asten Johnson Fezko Strakonice (H)	3	0	0	0	3	36	54	−18	**0**		11–24	13–17	12–13	—	Canc.
5	(Israel) Hapoel Emek Hayarden	0	0	0	0	0	0	0	0	**0**	Withdrew	Canc.	Canc.	Canc.	Canc.	—

Source: Report
(H) Host

=== Group C ===
Held in Burgas, Bulgaria

Pos	Team	Pld	W	PSW	PSL	L	GF	GA	GD	Pts	Qualification	(Serbia) CRV	(Portugal) FLU	(Malta) SIR	(Bulgaria) LOK	(United Kingdom) OTT
1	(Serbia) ZVK Crvena Zvezda	4	4	0	0	0	62	31	+31	**12**	Final six	—	—	19–12	17–3	—
2	(Portugal) Clube Fluvial Portuense	4	3	0	0	1	38	33	+5	**9**	Final six	8–14	—	—	—	12–7
3	(Malta) Sirens ASC	4	2	0	0	2	47	47	0	**6**		—	5–8	—	—	14–10
4	(Bulgaria) Kvt Lokomotiv-N.Nanov (H)	4	1	0	0	3	34	50	−16	**3**		—	7–10	10–16	—	—
5	(United Kingdom) Otter Swimming Club	4	0	0	0	4	32	52	−20	**0**		8–12	—	—	7–14	—

Source: Report
(H) Host

== Final six ==
There was originally going to be a home and away final to decide the champions. But due to the unexpected number of clubs entering the competition, the water polo committee altered the format to introduce a final six tournament.

=== Draw ===
The draw took place on 24 October in Barcelona. Pots 1 and 2 consist of the teams that finished first and second in the previous round respectively. The only restriction was that clubs from the same group in the previous round could not be drawn against each other.

Pot 1	Pot 2
(Croatia) Jadran Split (Turkey) Izmir BB GSK (Serbia) ZVK Crvena Zvezda	(Croatia) ŽAVK Mladost (Portugal) Sport Lisboa e Benfica (Portugal) Clube Fluvial Portuense

=== Host ===
The tournament was announced to be held in the Croatian capital, Zagreb, by ŽAVK Mladost, on 6 November.

=== Group A ===
Pos	Team	Pld	W	PSW	PSL	L	GF	GA	GD	Pts	Qualification	(Serbia) CRV	(Portugal) BEN	(Croatia) JAD
1	(Serbia) ZVK Crvena Zvezda	2	1	0	0	1	20	19	+1	**3 (Note: ZVK Crvena Zvezda 13–10 Sport Lisboa e Benfica)**	Final	—	13–10	—
2	(Portugal) Sport Lisboa e Benfica	2	1	0	0	1	22	21	+1	**3**	Third place match	—	—	12–8
3	(Croatia) Jadran Split	2	1	0	0	1	17	19	−2	**3**	Fifth place match	9–7	—	—

Source: Report
Notes:

24 November; 20:30	Report	**ZVK Crvena Zvezda** (Serbia)	**13**–10	(Portugal) Sport Lisboa e Benfica	Mladost pool Referees: Nikolett Sajben (HUN), Ralf Mueller (GER)
24 November; 20:30	Report	Score by quarters: **4**–1, 3–**5**, **3**–2, **3**–2			Mladost pool Referees: Nikolett Sajben (HUN), Ralf Mueller (GER)
24 November; 20:30	Report	Lukic 5	**Goals**	Pereira da Mata 4	Mladost pool Referees: Nikolett Sajben (HUN), Ralf Mueller (GER)

25 November; 12:00	Report	**Sport Lisboa e Benfica** (Portugal)	**12**–8	(Croatia) Jadran Split	Mladost pool Referees: Peter de Jong (NED), Martina Kunikova (SVK)
25 November; 12:00	Report	Score by quarters: 1–**4**, **4**–1, **4**–1, **3**–2			Mladost pool Referees: Peter de Jong (NED), Martina Kunikova (SVK)
25 November; 12:00	Report	Perez 4	**Goals**	Butic, Jankovic 3	Mladost pool Referees: Peter de Jong (NED), Martina Kunikova (SVK)

25 November; 19:30	Report	**Jadran Split** (Croatia)	**9**–7	(Serbia) ZVK Crvena Zvezda	Mladost pool Referees: Marta Cabanas (ESP), Nikolett Sajben (HUN)
25 November; 19:30	Report	Score by quarters: 1–**4**, **2**–1, **2**–1, **4**–1			Mladost pool Referees: Marta Cabanas (ESP), Nikolett Sajben (HUN)
25 November; 19:30	Report	Butic 3	**Goals**	Diaz Mesa 3	Mladost pool Referees: Marta Cabanas (ESP), Nikolett Sajben (HUN)

=== Group B ===
Pos	Team	Pld	W	PSW	PSL	L	GF	GA	GD	Pts	Qualification	(Turkey) IZM	(Croatia) MLA	(Portugal) FLU
1	(Turkey) Izmir BB GSK	2	2	0	0	0	30	17	+13	**6**	Final	—	12–9	—
2	(Croatia) ŽAVK Mladost (H)	2	1	0	0	1	26	21	+5	**3**	Third place match	—	—	17–9
3	(Portugal) Clube Fluvial Portuense	2	0	0	0	2	17	35	−18	**0**	Fifth place match	8–18	—	—

Source: Report
(H) Host

24 November 2023; 19:00	Report	**Izmir BB GSK** (Turkey)	**12**–9	(Croatia) ŽAVK Mladost	Mladost pool Referees: Marta Cabanas (ESP), Martina Kunikova (SVK)
24 November 2023; 19:00	Report	Score by quarters: **4**–3, **6**–0, 1–**3**, 1–**3**			Mladost pool Referees: Marta Cabanas (ESP), Martina Kunikova (SVK)
24 November 2023; 19:00	Report	Kus 5	**Goals**	Rozic 3	Mladost pool Referees: Marta Cabanas (ESP), Martina Kunikova (SVK)

25 November 2023; 10:30	Report	**ŽAVK Mladost** (Croatia)	**17**–9	(Portugal) Clube Fluvial Portuense	Mladost pool Referees: Ralf Mueller (GER), Ioana Prodan (ROU)
25 November 2023; 10:30	Report	Score by quarters: 3–3, **2**–1, **5**–3, **7**–2			Mladost pool Referees: Ralf Mueller (GER), Ioana Prodan (ROU)
25 November 2023; 10:30	Report	Brnetic 5	**Goals**	Santos 5	Mladost pool Referees: Ralf Mueller (GER), Ioana Prodan (ROU)

25 November 2023; 18:00	Report	Clube Fluvial Portuense (Portugal)	8–**18**	(Turkey) **Izmir BB GSK**	Mladost pool Referees: Ioana Prodan (ROU), Peter de Jong (NED)
25 November 2023; 18:00	Report	Score by quarters: 1–**8**, 0–**7**, 3–3, **4**–0			Mladost pool Referees: Ioana Prodan (ROU), Peter de Jong (NED)
25 November 2023; 18:00	Report	three players 2	**Goals**	Dabbag, Kus 4	Mladost pool Referees: Ioana Prodan (ROU), Peter de Jong (NED)

=== Fifth place match ===
Fifth place match
November 26
**(Croatia) Jadran Split**	**18**
(Portugal) Clube Fluvial Portuense	11

26 November 2023; 10:00	Report	**Jadran Split** (Croatia)	**18**–11	(Portugal) Clube Fluvial Portuense	Mladost pool Referees: Nikolett Sajban (HUN), Ioana Prodan (ROU)
26 November 2023; 10:00	Report	Score by quarters: **5**–1, 4–**5**, **6**–1, 3–**4**			Mladost pool Referees: Nikolett Sajban (HUN), Ioana Prodan (ROU)
26 November 2023; 10:00	Report	Jankovic 6	**Goals**	Montero de Andrade 5	Mladost pool Referees: Nikolett Sajban (HUN), Ioana Prodan (ROU)

=== Third place match ===
Third place match
November 26
(Portugal) Sport Lisboa e Benfica	13
**(Croatia) ŽAVK Mladost**	**14**

26 November; 11:30	Report	Sport Lisboa e Benfica (Portugal)	13–**14**	(Croatia) **ŽAVK Mladost**	Mladost pool Referees: Martina Kunikova (SVK), Ralf Mueller (GER)
26 November; 11:30	Report	Score by quarters: 1–**4**, 0–**2**, **6**–4, **6**–4			Mladost pool Referees: Martina Kunikova (SVK), Ralf Mueller (GER)
26 November; 11:30	Report	Perez 8	**Goals**	four players 4	Mladost pool Referees: Martina Kunikova (SVK), Ralf Mueller (GER)

=== Final ===
Final
November 26
(Serbia) ZVK Crvena Zvezda	9
**(Turkey) Izmir BB GSK**	**10**

26 November; 13:00	Report	ZVK Crvena Zvezda (Serbia)	9–**10**	(Turkey) **Izmir BB GSK**	Mladost pool Referees: Marta Cabanas (ESP), Peter de Jong (NED)
26 November; 13:00	Report	Score by quarters: 3–3, 1–**3**, 2–2, **3**–2			Mladost pool Referees: Marta Cabanas (ESP), Peter de Jong (NED)
26 November; 13:00	Report	Radonjic 4	**Goals**	Kus 4	Mladost pool Referees: Marta Cabanas (ESP), Peter de Jong (NED)

2023–24 LEN Women's Challenger Cup Champions

**Izmir BB GSK**
First title

== See also ==
- 2023–24 LEN Champions League
- 2023–24 LEN Euro Cup
- 2023–24 LEN Challenger Cup
- 2023 LEN Super Cup
- 2023–24 LEN Women's Champions League
- 2023–24 LEN Women's Euro Cup
- 2023 LEN Women's Super Cup
