= Water polo at the 2015 Summer Universiade – Women's tournament =

Water polo at the XXVIII Summer Universiade

Medalists
1st place, gold medalist(s)		Australia
2nd place, silver medalist(s)		Canada
3rd place, bronze medalist(s)		Russia

Women's water polo at the 2015 Summer Universiade was held in Yeomju Indoor Aquatics Center, Gwangju, Korea from 2–14 July 2015.

== Results ==
All times are Korea Standard Time (UTC+09:00)

=== Preliminary round ===
==== Group A ====
Team	Pld	W	D	L	GF	GA	GD	Pts
Canada	4	4	0	0	51	32	+19	8
Russia	4	3	0	1	63	40	+23	6
Japan	4	2	0	2	50	55	−5	4
China	4	1	0	3	34	50	−16	2
Serbia	4	0	0	4	36	57	−21	0

2 July; 9:00	Report	China	9–13	Japan	Yeomju Indoor Aquatics Center, Gwangju; Referees: Gabriella erzsebet Birri (HUN); Stefano Pinato (ITA)
2 July; 9:00	Report	Score by quarters: 4–6, 3–2, 1–2, 1–3			Yeomju Indoor Aquatics Center, Gwangju; Referees: Gabriella erzsebet Birri (HUN); Stefano Pinato (ITA)

2 July; 10:30	Report	Canada	16–8	Serbia	Yeomju Indoor Aquatics Center, Gwangju; Referees: David Gerrie (AUS); Erwin Schapers (NED)
2 July; 10:30	Report	Score by quarters: 4–5, 6–1, 2–0, 4–2			Yeomju Indoor Aquatics Center, Gwangju; Referees: David Gerrie (AUS); Erwin Schapers (NED)

3 July; 12:00	Report	Serbia	8–11	China	Yeomju Indoor Aquatics Center, Gwangju; Referees: Fabio Brasiliano (ITA); Lee Taikweon (KOR)
3 July; 12:00	Report	Score by quarters: 2–1, 3–3, 2–4, 1–3			Yeomju Indoor Aquatics Center, Gwangju; Referees: Fabio Brasiliano (ITA); Lee Taikweon (KOR)

3 July; 13:30	Report	Russia	8–9	Canada	Yeomju Indoor Aquatics Center, Gwangju; Referees: David Gerrie (AUS); Amber DRURY-PINTO (USA)
3 July; 13:30	Report	Score by quarters: 2–2, 4–3, 0–4, 2–0			Yeomju Indoor Aquatics Center, Gwangju; Referees: David Gerrie (AUS); Amber DRURY-PINTO (USA)

5 July; 9:00	Report	Japan	14–10	Serbia	Yeomju Indoor Aquatics Center, Gwangju; Referees: Gabriella erzsebet Birri (HUN); Lee Taikweon (KOR)
5 July; 9:00	Report	Score by quarters: 5–1, 1–2, 2–3, 6–4			Yeomju Indoor Aquatics Center, Gwangju; Referees: Gabriella erzsebet Birri (HUN); Lee Taikweon (KOR)

5 July; 10:30	Report	China	9–18	Russia	Yeomju Indoor Aquatics Center, Gwangju; Referees: Zsolt Marjay (HUN); Amber Drury-Pinto (USA)
5 July; 10:30	Report	Score by quarters: 4–5, 2–3, 2–6, 1–4			Yeomju Indoor Aquatics Center, Gwangju; Referees: Zsolt Marjay (HUN); Amber Drury-Pinto (USA)

6 July; 9:00	Report	Russia	21–12	Japan	Yeomju Indoor Aquatics Center, Gwangju; Referees: David Gerrie (AUS); Amber Drury-Pinto (USA)
6 July; 9:00	Report	Score by quarters: 5–1, 7–3, 5–5, 4–3			Yeomju Indoor Aquatics Center, Gwangju; Referees: David Gerrie (AUS); Amber Drury-Pinto (USA)

6 July; 10:30	Report	Canada	11–5	China	Yeomju Indoor Aquatics Center, Gwangju; Referees: Gabriella erzsebet Birri (HUN); Stefano Pinato (ITA)
6 July; 10:30	Report	Score by quarters: 2–1, 4–0, 3–2, 2–2			Yeomju Indoor Aquatics Center, Gwangju; Referees: Gabriella erzsebet Birri (HUN); Stefano Pinato (ITA)

7 July; 12:00	Report	Japan	11–15	Canada	Yeomju Indoor Aquatics Center, Gwangju; Referees: Zsolt Marjay (HUN); Amber Drury-Pinto (USA)
7 July; 12:00	Report	Score by quarters: 2–4, 2–5, 2–3, 5–3			Yeomju Indoor Aquatics Center, Gwangju; Referees: Zsolt Marjay (HUN); Amber Drury-Pinto (USA)

7 July; 13:30	Report	Russia	16–10	Serbia	Yeomju Indoor Aquatics Center, Gwangju; Referees: Gabriella erzsebet Birri (HUN); Lee Taikweon (KOR)
7 July; 13:30	Report	Score by quarters: 4–7, 7–1, 4–0, 1–2			Yeomju Indoor Aquatics Center, Gwangju; Referees: Gabriella erzsebet Birri (HUN); Lee Taikweon (KOR)

==== Group B ====
Team	Pld	W	D	L	GF	GA	GD	Pts
Australia	4	3	1	0	34	21	+13	7
Italy	4	3	0	1	34	26	+8	6
United States	4	1	1	2	35	35	0	3
Hungary	4	1	0	3	29	37	−8	2
France	4	1	0	3	20	33	−13	2

3 July; 9:00	Report	Australia	7–7	United States	Yeomju Indoor Aquatics Center, Gwangju; Referees: Dario Balazevic (SRB); Haldun Toygarli (TUR)
3 July; 9:00	Report	Score by quarters: 1–1, 2–3, 1–0, 3–3			Yeomju Indoor Aquatics Center, Gwangju; Referees: Dario Balazevic (SRB); Haldun Toygarli (TUR)

3 July; 10:30	Report	Italy	5–2	France	Yeomju Indoor Aquatics Center, Gwangju; Referees: Hiroaki Ogino (JPN); Vladimir Gerzanich (RUS)
3 July; 10:30	Report	Score by quarters: 2–1, 1–1, 1–0, 1–0			Yeomju Indoor Aquatics Center, Gwangju; Referees: Hiroaki Ogino (JPN); Vladimir Gerzanich (RUS)

4 July; 9:00	Report	France	3–8	Australia	Yeomju Indoor Aquatics Center, Gwangju; Referees: Ernest Inesta Peralta (ESP); Haldun Toygarli (TUR)
4 July; 9:00	Report	Score by quarters: 1–2, 1–2, 0–2, 1–2			Yeomju Indoor Aquatics Center, Gwangju; Referees: Ernest Inesta Peralta (ESP); Haldun Toygarli (TUR)

4 July; 10:30	Report	Hungary	6–12	Italy	Yeomju Indoor Aquatics Center, Gwangju; Referees: Irfan Sadekov (RUS); Ivanka Rakovic Krstonosic (SRB)
4 July; 10:30	Report	Score by quarters: 2–5, 1–1, 2–2, 1–4			Yeomju Indoor Aquatics Center, Gwangju; Referees: Irfan Sadekov (RUS); Ivanka Rakovic Krstonosic (SRB)

5 July; 12:00	Report	United States	9–10	France	Yeomju Indoor Aquatics Center, Gwangju; Referees: Ernest Inesta Peralta (ESP); Dario Balazevic (SRB)
5 July; 12:00	Report	Score by quarters: 3–1, 2–3, 2–3, 2–3			Yeomju Indoor Aquatics Center, Gwangju; Referees: Ernest Inesta Peralta (ESP); Dario Balazevic (SRB)

5 July; 13:30	Report	Australia	10–4	Hungary	Yeomju Indoor Aquatics Center, Gwangju; Referees: Marie-Claude Deslieres (CAN); Dragan Stampalija (CRO)
5 July; 13:30	Report	Score by quarters: 3–0, 2–1, 2–2, 3–1			Yeomju Indoor Aquatics Center, Gwangju; Referees: Marie-Claude Deslieres (CAN); Dragan Stampalija (CRO)

7 July; 9:00	Report	Hungary	8–10	United States	Yeomju Indoor Aquatics Center, Gwangju; Referees: Nikolaos Boudramis (GRE) Erwin Schapers (NED)
7 July; 9:00	Report	Score by quarters: 2–4, 3–3, 1–3, 2–0			Yeomju Indoor Aquatics Center, Gwangju; Referees: Nikolaos Boudramis (GRE) Erwin Schapers (NED)

7 July; 10:30	Report	Italy	7–9	Australia	Yeomju Indoor Aquatics Center, Gwangju; Referees: Marie-Claude Deslieres (CAN); Ernest Inesta Peralta (ESP)
7 July; 10:30	Report	Score by quarters: 2–2, 2–3, 1–4, 2–0			Yeomju Indoor Aquatics Center, Gwangju; Referees: Marie-Claude Deslieres (CAN); Ernest Inesta Peralta (ESP)

8 July; 9:00	United States	9–10	Italy	Yeomju Indoor Aquatics Center, Gwangju

8 July; 10:30	Hungary	11–5	France	Yeomju Indoor Aquatics Center, Gwangju

== Final round ==
=== Final eight ===
Quarterfinals
9 July
Canada	7
Hungary	5
9 July
Russia	9
United States	8
9 July
Japan	12
Italy	13
9 July
China	7
Australia	15

Semifinals
11 July
Canada	7
Italy	5
11 July
Russia	7
Australia	10

Final
13 July
Canada
Australia
3rd place match
13 July
Italy
Russia

5th–8th semifinals
12 July
United States
China
12 July
Hungary
Japan

5th place match
13 July
United States
Hungary
-

5th–8th semifinals
12 July
Japan
12 July
China

7th place match
13 July
France
Japan
10th place match
13 July
China
Serbia

==== Quarterfinals ====
9 July; 15:30	Canada	7–5	Hungary	Yeomju Indoor Aquatics Center, Gwangju

9 July; 17:00	Russia	9–8	United States	Yeomju Indoor Aquatics Center, Gwangju

9 July; 18:30	Japan	12–13	Italy	Yeomju Indoor Aquatics Center, Gwangju

9 July; 20:00	China	7–15	Australia	Yeomju Indoor Aquatics Center, Gwangju

==== 5th–10th semifinals ====
9 July; 14:30	Serbia	5–10	France	Yeomju Indoor Aquatics Center, Gwangju

10 July; 9:00	Hungary	12–9	Japan	Yeomju Indoor Aquatics Center, Gwangju

10 July; 10:30	United States	11–2	China	Yeomju Indoor Aquatics Center, Gwangju

11 July; 9:00	Japan	8–6	China	Yeomju Indoor Aquatics Center, Gwangju

==== Semifinals ====
11 July; 19:00	Canada	7–5	Italy	Yeomju Indoor Aquatics Center, Gwangju

12 July; 20:30	Russia	7–10	Australia	Yeomju Indoor Aquatics Center, Gwangju

==== 9th place match ====
12 July; 9:00	China	14–13	Serbia	Yeomju Indoor Aquatics Center, Gwangju

==== 7th place match ====
12 July; 10:30	Japan	7–9	France	Yeomju Indoor Aquatics Center, Gwangju

==== 5th place match ====
11 July; 10:30	Hungary	4–9	United States	Yeomju Indoor Aquatics Center, Gwangju

==== 3rd place match ====
13 July; 18:30	Italy	8–13	Russia	Yeomju Indoor Aquatics Center, Gwangju

==== Final ====
13 July; 20:00	Canada	3–6	Australia	Yeomju Indoor Aquatics Center, Gwangju

== Final standing ==
Rank	Team
1st place, gold medalist(s)	Australia
2nd place, silver medalist(s)	Canada
3rd place, bronze medalist(s)	Russia
4	Italy
5	United States
6	Hungary
7	France
8	Japan
9	China
10	Serbia
