= 2024–25 European Aquatics Women's Challenger Cup =

Water polo sports season

European Aquatics Women's Challenger Cup
- 2024–25

Tournament information
- Sport: Water polo
- Dates: Qualification round I: 7–10 November 2024; Qualification round II: 7–8 December 2024; Final four: 22–23 February 2025
- Teams: Total: 17 (from 11 countries)
- Website: Official website

Final positions
- Champions: (Turkey) Izmir BSB Spor (2nd title)
- Runner-up: (Turkey) Galatasaray Zena

Tournament statistics
- Matches played: 44
- Goals scored: 1,022 (23.23 per match)

The 2024–25 European Aquatics Women's Challenger Cup is the 2nd edition of the water polo competition organised by European Aquatics. It acted as the third tier, below the European Aquatics Women's Champions League and the European Aquatics Women's Euro Cup. Izmir BSB Spor are the defending champions.

This is the last season where the Challenger Cup is the third tier tournament in European water polo, with the Conference Cup taking its place.

Izmir BSB Spor successfully defended their title after triumphing over fellow Turkish side Galatasaray Zena in the final.

== Format ==
17 teams are separated into four groups of four or five. Each group is held at one club. The top 2 from each group advance to Qualification round II. The last eight teams are then drawn into two groups of four, with the top two from both groups advancing to the final four to decide the champion.

== Rankings ==
Only teams below the top 6 can enter the competition.

Rank	Association	Points	Teams
1	Spain	124,200	0
2	Greece	105,102.5	0
3	Hungary	89,452.5	0
4	Italy	76,760	0
5	France	35,147.5	0
6	Netherlands	13,785	0
7	Russia	9,217.5	0
8	Germany	8,290	2
9	Portugal	6,010	1
10	Malta	4,090	2

Rank	Association	Points	Teams
11	Croatia	2,930	2
12	Serbia	2,860	2
13	Turkey	2,560	3
14	Slovakia	1,715	0
15	(United Kingdom) Great Britain	1,330	2
16	Israel	1,250	1
17	Sweden	1,060	0
18	Bulgaria	770	0
19	Czech Republic	770	1
N/A	Romania	0	1

== Teams ==
Only countries below the top 6 in the European Aquatics women's club rankings can enter teams into this competition.

Participating teams
(Croatia) ŽAVK Mladost	(Croatia) Jadran Split	(Czech Republic) AJF Strakonice	(Germany) SSV Esslingen
(Germany) SV Blau-Weiss Bochum	(United Kingdom) Otter Swimming Club	(United Kingdom) City Of Manchester WPC	(Israel) Hapoel Emek Hayarden
(Malta) Sirens ASC	(Malta) Sliema ASC	(Portugal) Sport Lisboa e Benfica	(Romania) CSM Unirea Alba Iulia
(Serbia) VK Vojvodina	(Serbia) ZVK Crvena Zvezda	(Turkey) Izmir BSB Spor	(Turkey) Galatasaray Zena
(Turkey) Dalton Koleji SK			

== Schedule ==
=== Rounds and dates ===
Phase	Round date
Qualification round I	7–10 November 2024
Qualification round II	7–8 December 2024
Final four	22–23 February 2025

== Qualification round I ==
In the qualification round I, teams play in a round robin format. The top 2 in each group advance.

=== Draw ===
The draw was on 16 September 2024. H indicates which club is hosting the groups. Teams in bold advanced to the next round. The seeding was decided by as follows:

- The European Aquatics club rankings.
- European Aquatics country club rankings.
- European Aquatics women's national team rankings.

Pot 1	Pot 2	Pot 3	Pot 4
(Malta) Sirens ASC **(H)** (Turkey) **Izmir BSB Spor** (Serbia) ZVK Crvena Zvezda (Croatia) **ŽAVK Mladost**	(Portugal) **Sport Lisboa e Benfica** (Croatia) **Jadran Split** (Serbia) **VK Vojvodina** **(H)** (Czech Republic) AJF Strakonice **(H)**	(United Kingdom) City Of Manchester WPC (United Kingdom) **Otter Swimming Club** (Germany) SSV Esslingen (Germany) **SV Blau-Weiss Bochum**	(Malta) Sliema ASC (Turkey) **Galatasaray Zena** (Turkey) Dalton Koleji SK (Israel) Hapoel Emek Hayarden (Romania) CSM Unirea Alba Iulia **(H)**

=== Group A ===
Held in Novi Sad, Serbia

Pos	Team	Pld	W	PSW	PSL	L	GF	GA	GD	Pts	Qualification	(Turkey) IZM	(Serbia) VOJ	(United Kingdom) MAN	(Malta) SLI
1	(Turkey) Izmir BSB Spor	3	3	0	0	0	48	16	+32	**9**	Qualification round II	—	—	—	—
2	(Serbia) VK Vojvodina (H)	3	2	0	0	1	42	27	+15	**6**	Qualification round II	8–13	—	14–9	20–5
3	(United Kingdom) City Of Manchester WPC	3	1	0	0	2	33	35	−2	**3**		6–12	—	—	18–9
4	(Malta) Sliema ASC	3	0	0	0	3	16	61	−45	**0**		2–23	—	—	—

Source: European Aquatics
(H) Host

8 November 2024; 19:00	Report	**VK Vojvodina** (Serbia)	**20**–5	(Malta) Sliema ASC	Slana Bara Sports Center, Novi Sad; Referees: Nikolett Sajben (HUN), Karel Dvoracek (CZE)
8 November 2024; 19:00	Report	Score by quarters: **5**–0, **6**–2, **7**–0, 2–**3**			Slana Bara Sports Center, Novi Sad; Referees: Nikolett Sajben (HUN), Karel Dvoracek (CZE)
8 November 2024; 19:00	Report	Radonjic 5	**Goals**	Camilleri, Schembri 2	Slana Bara Sports Center, Novi Sad; Referees: Nikolett Sajben (HUN), Karel Dvoracek (CZE)

8 November 2024; 21:00	Report	City Of Manchester WPC (United Kingdom)	6–**12**	(Turkey) **Izmir BSB Spor**	Slana Bara Sports Center, Novi Sad; Referees: Sara Kontek (CRO), Luis Santos (POR)
8 November 2024; 21:00	Report	Score by quarters: 2–**4**, 0–**3**, 0–**4**, **4**–1			Slana Bara Sports Center, Novi Sad; Referees: Sara Kontek (CRO), Luis Santos (POR)
8 November 2024; 21:00	Report	Cutler 3	**Goals**	Louise Wright 5	Slana Bara Sports Center, Novi Sad; Referees: Sara Kontek (CRO), Luis Santos (POR)

9 November 2024; 19:00	Report	**VK Vojvodina** (Serbia)	**14**–9	(United Kingdom) City Of Manchester WPC	Slana Bara Sports Center, Novi Sad; Referees: Nikolett Sajben (HUN), Luis Santos (POR)
9 November 2024; 19:00	Report	Score by quarters: **2**–1, 4–4, **6**–2, 2–2			Slana Bara Sports Center, Novi Sad; Referees: Nikolett Sajben (HUN), Luis Santos (POR)
9 November 2024; 19:00	Report	Radonjic, Savchenko 4	**Goals**	three players 2	Slana Bara Sports Center, Novi Sad; Referees: Nikolett Sajben (HUN), Luis Santos (POR)

9 November 2024; 21:00	Report	Sliema ASC (Malta)	2–**23**	(Turkey) **Izmir BSB Spor**	Slana Bara Sports Center, Novi Sad; Referees: Sara Kontek (CRO), Karel Dvoracek (CZE)
9 November 2024; 21:00	Report	Score by quarters: 0–**7**, 0–**6**, 1–**4**, 1–**6**			Slana Bara Sports Center, Novi Sad; Referees: Sara Kontek (CRO), Karel Dvoracek (CZE)
9 November 2024; 21:00	Report	Camilleri, Schembri 1	**Goals**	Kus 7	Slana Bara Sports Center, Novi Sad; Referees: Sara Kontek (CRO), Karel Dvoracek (CZE)

10 November 2024; 10:00	Report	VK Vojvodina (Serbia)	8–**13**	(Turkey) **Izmir BSB Spor**	Slana Bara Sports Center, Novi Sad; Referees: Luis Santos (POR), Karel Dvoracek (CZE)
10 November 2024; 10:00	Report	Score by quarters: 1–**2**, 2–**4**, 1–**5**, **4**–2			Slana Bara Sports Center, Novi Sad; Referees: Luis Santos (POR), Karel Dvoracek (CZE)
10 November 2024; 10:00	Report	Amliaeva 3	**Goals**	Jackovich 5	Slana Bara Sports Center, Novi Sad; Referees: Luis Santos (POR), Karel Dvoracek (CZE)

10 November 2024; 12:00	Report	**City Of Manchester WPC** (United Kingdom)	**18**–9	(Malta) Sliema ASC	Slana Bara Sports Center, Novi Sad; Referees: Nikolett Sajben (HUN), Sara Kontek (CRO)
10 November 2024; 12:00	Report	Score by quarters: **6**–2, **7**–2, 3–3, 2–2			Slana Bara Sports Center, Novi Sad; Referees: Nikolett Sajben (HUN), Sara Kontek (CRO)
10 November 2024; 12:00	Report	seven players 2	**Goals**	Paolella 5	Slana Bara Sports Center, Novi Sad; Referees: Nikolett Sajben (HUN), Sara Kontek (CRO)

=== Group B ===
Held in Valletta, Malta

Pos	Team	Pld	W	PSW	PSL	L	GF	GA	GD	Pts	Qualification	(Croatia) JAD	(Germany) BOC	(Malta) SIR	(Israel) HAP
1	(Croatia) Jadran Split	3	3	0	0	0	47	20	+27	**9**	Qualification round II	—	15–10	—	—
2	(Germany) SV Blau-Weiss Bochum	3	2	0	0	1	44	33	+11	**6**	Qualification round II	—	—	—	19–11
3	(Malta) Sirens ASC (H)	3	1	0	0	2	27	36	−9	**3**		6–11	7–15	—	14–10
4	(Israel) Hapoel Emek Hayarden	3	0	0	0	3	25	54	−29	**0**		4–21	—	—	—

Source: European Aquatics
(H) Host

8 November 2024; 18:00	Report	**Jadran Split** (Croatia)	**15**–10	(Germany) SV Blau-Weiss Bochum	Cottonera Sports Complex, Valletta; Referees: Ilkin Cakmakoglu (TUR), Manuel Manea (ROU)
8 November 2024; 18:00	Report	Score by quarters: 4–**5**, **5**–2, **4**–1, 2–2			Cottonera Sports Complex, Valletta; Referees: Ilkin Cakmakoglu (TUR), Manuel Manea (ROU)
8 November 2024; 18:00	Report	Butic 5	**Goals**	Fry 3	Cottonera Sports Complex, Valletta; Referees: Ilkin Cakmakoglu (TUR), Manuel Manea (ROU)

8 November 2024; 20:00	Report	**Sirens ASC** (Malta)	**14**–10	(Israel) Hapoel Emek Hayarden	Cottonera Sports Complex, Valletta; Referees: Martina Kunikova (SVK), Damien Taylor (GBR)
8 November 2024; 20:00	Report	Score by quarters: **6**–2, 3–**4**, 1–**2**, **4**–2			Cottonera Sports Complex, Valletta; Referees: Martina Kunikova (SVK), Damien Taylor (GBR)
8 November 2024; 20:00	Report	Perkins 8	**Goals**	Markovsky 3	Cottonera Sports Complex, Valletta; Referees: Martina Kunikova (SVK), Damien Taylor (GBR)

9 November 2024; 17:00	Report	Hapoel Emek Hayarden (Israel)	4–**21**	(Croatia) **Jadran Split**	Cottonera Sports Complex, Valletta; Referees: Damien Taylor (GBR), Ilkin Cakmakoglu (TUR)
9 November 2024; 17:00	Report	Score by quarters: 1–**4**, 2–**5**, 0–**5**, 1–**7**			Cottonera Sports Complex, Valletta; Referees: Damien Taylor (GBR), Ilkin Cakmakoglu (TUR)
9 November 2024; 17:00	Report	Markovsky, Vaizberg 2	**Goals**	Jankovic 4	Cottonera Sports Complex, Valletta; Referees: Damien Taylor (GBR), Ilkin Cakmakoglu (TUR)

9 November 2024; 19:00	Report	Sirens ASC (Malta)	7–**15**	(Germany) **SV Blau-Weiss Bochum**	Cottonera Sports Complex, Valletta; Referees: Manuel Manea (ROU), Martina Kunikova (SVK)
9 November 2024; 19:00	Report	Score by quarters: 1–**4**, 2–2, 2–**4**, 2–**5**			Cottonera Sports Complex, Valletta; Referees: Manuel Manea (ROU), Martina Kunikova (SVK)
9 November 2024; 19:00	Report	Perkins 5	**Goals**	four players 3	Cottonera Sports Complex, Valletta; Referees: Manuel Manea (ROU), Martina Kunikova (SVK)

10 November 2024; 10:00	Report	**SV Blau-Weiss Bochum** (Germany)	**19**–11	(Israel) Hapoel Emek Hayarden	Cottonera Sports Complex, Valletta; Referees: Ilkin Cakmakoglu (TUR), Martina Kunikova (SVK)
10 November 2024; 10:00	Report	Score by quarters: **5**–2, 4–**5**, **6**–2, **4**–2			Cottonera Sports Complex, Valletta; Referees: Ilkin Cakmakoglu (TUR), Martina Kunikova (SVK)
10 November 2024; 10:00	Report	Fry 6	**Goals**	Markovsky 4	Cottonera Sports Complex, Valletta; Referees: Ilkin Cakmakoglu (TUR), Martina Kunikova (SVK)

10 November 2024; 12:00	Report	Sirens ASC (Malta)	6–**11**	(Croatia) **Jadran Split**	Cottonera Sports Complex, Valletta; Referees: Manuel Manea (ROU), Damien Taylor (GBR)
10 November 2024; 12:00	Report	Score by quarters: 1–1, 3–**5**, 1–**4**, 1–1			Cottonera Sports Complex, Valletta; Referees: Manuel Manea (ROU), Damien Taylor (GBR)
10 November 2024; 12:00	Report	Perkins 3	**Goals**	Jankovic 5	Cottonera Sports Complex, Valletta; Referees: Manuel Manea (ROU), Damien Taylor (GBR)

=== Group C ===
Held in Strakonice, Czech Republic

Pos	Team	Pld	W	PSW	PSL	L	GF	GA	GD	Pts	Qualification	(Croatia) MLA	(United Kingdom) OTT	(Turkey) DAL	(Czech Republic) STR
1	(Croatia) ŽAVK Mladost	3	3	0	0	0	66	21	+45	**9**	Qualification round II	—	26–6	18–5	—
2	(United Kingdom) Otter Swimming Club	3	1	1	0	1	28	45	−17	**5**	Qualification round II	—	—	13–10	—
3	(Turkey) Dalton Koleji SK	3	1	0	0	2	26	39	−13	**3**		—	—	—	—
4	(Czech Republic) AJF Strakonice (H)	3	0	0	1	2	27	42	−15	**1**		10–22	9–12 (Note: Matched finished 9–9, Otter Swimming Club won 3–0 on penalties.)	8–11	—

Source: European Aquatics
(H) Host

8 November 2024; 17:00	Report	**Otter Swimming Club** (United Kingdom)	**13**–10	(Turkey) Dalton Koleji SK	Strakonice Pool, Strakonice; Referees: Michaela Naneva (BUL), Massimo Angileri (MLT)
8 November 2024; 17:00	Report	Score by quarters: **2**–1, **4**–1, 4–**6**, **3**–2			Strakonice Pool, Strakonice; Referees: Michaela Naneva (BUL), Massimo Angileri (MLT)
8 November 2024; 17:00	Report	Snyder 5	**Goals**	Arik 4	Strakonice Pool, Strakonice; Referees: Michaela Naneva (BUL), Massimo Angileri (MLT)

8 November 2024; 19:00	Report	AJF Strakonice (Czech Republic)	10–**22**	(Croatia) **ŽAVK Mladost**	Strakonice Pool, Strakonice; Referees: Ivanka Rakovic Krstonosic (SRB), Ralf Mueller (GER)
8 November 2024; 19:00	Report	Score by quarters: 1–**5**, 3–**6**, 3–**6**, 3–**5**			Strakonice Pool, Strakonice; Referees: Ivanka Rakovic Krstonosic (SRB), Ralf Mueller (GER)
8 November 2024; 19:00	Report	Hola 3	**Goals**	Rozic 9	Strakonice Pool, Strakonice; Referees: Ivanka Rakovic Krstonosic (SRB), Ralf Mueller (GER)

9 November 2024; 17:00	Report	**ŽAVK Mladost** (Croatia)	**26**–6	(United Kingdom) Otter Swimming Club	Strakonice Pool, Strakonice; Referees: Massimo Angileri (MLT), Ralf Mueller (GER)
9 November 2024; 17:00	Report	Score by quarters: **7**–1, **8**–0, **7**–4, **4**–1			Strakonice Pool, Strakonice; Referees: Massimo Angileri (MLT), Ralf Mueller (GER)
9 November 2024; 17:00	Report	Rozic 9	**Goals**	Mulcahy, Williams 2	Strakonice Pool, Strakonice; Referees: Massimo Angileri (MLT), Ralf Mueller (GER)

9 November 2024; 19:00	Report	AJF Strakonice (Czech Republic)	8–**11**	(Turkey) **Dalton Koleji SK**	Strakonice Pool, Strakonice; Referees: Michaela Naneva (BUL), Ivanka Rakovic Krstonosic (SRB)
9 November 2024; 19:00	Report	Score by quarters: **3**–1, 1–**2**, 3–**4**, 1–**4**			Strakonice Pool, Strakonice; Referees: Michaela Naneva (BUL), Ivanka Rakovic Krstonosic (SRB)
9 November 2024; 19:00	Report	Hola 3	**Goals**	Altiparmak 6	Strakonice Pool, Strakonice; Referees: Michaela Naneva (BUL), Ivanka Rakovic Krstonosic (SRB)

10 November 2024; 09:00	Report	**ŽAVK Mladost** (Croatia)	**18**–5	(Turkey) Dalton Koleji SK	Strakonice Pool, Strakonice; Referees: Ivanka Rakovic Krstonosic (SRB), Massimo Angileri (MLT)
10 November 2024; 09:00	Report	Score by quarters: **5**–2, **3**–0, **5**–1, **5**–2			Strakonice Pool, Strakonice; Referees: Ivanka Rakovic Krstonosic (SRB), Massimo Angileri (MLT)
10 November 2024; 09:00	Report	Glas 6	**Goals**	Altiparmak 3	Strakonice Pool, Strakonice; Referees: Ivanka Rakovic Krstonosic (SRB), Massimo Angileri (MLT)

10 November 2024; 12:00	Report	AJF Strakonice (Czech Republic)	9–**12**	(United Kingdom) **Otter Swimming Club**	Strakonice Pool, Strakonice; Referees: Michaela Naneva (BUL), Ralf Mueller (GER)
10 November 2024; 12:00	Report	Score by quarters: **3**–2, **2**–1, 1–**5**, **3**–1 PSO: 0–**3**			Strakonice Pool, Strakonice; Referees: Michaela Naneva (BUL), Ralf Mueller (GER)
10 November 2024; 12:00	Report	Hola 6	**Goals**	Snyder 3	Strakonice Pool, Strakonice; Referees: Michaela Naneva (BUL), Ralf Mueller (GER)

=== Group D ===
Held in Alba Iulia, Romania

Pos	Team	Pld	W	PSW	PSL	L	GF	GA	GD	Pts	Qualification	(Portugal) BEN	(Turkey) GAL	(Romania) UNI	(Germany) ESS	(Serbia) CRV
1	(Portugal) Sport Lisboa e Benfica	4	3	1	0	0	59	33	+26	**11**	Qualification round II	—	—	13–11 (Note: Matched finished 8–8, Sport Lisboa e Benfica won 5–3 on penalties.)	11–10	—
2	(Turkey) Galatasaray Zena	4	3	0	0	1	43	38	+5	**9**	Qualification round II	8–12	—	10–8	10–8	—
3	(Romania) CSM Unirea Alba Iulia (H)	4	2	0	1	1	50	31	+19	**7**		—	—	—	12–9	22–4
4	(Germany) SSV Esslingen	4	1	0	0	3	53	36	+17	**3**		—	—	—	—	26–3
5	(Serbia) ZVK Crvena Zvezda	4	0	0	0	4	24	91	−67	**0**		7–28	10–15	—	—	—

Source: European Aquatics
(H) Host

7 November 2024; 17:00	Report	ZVK Crvena Zvezda (Serbia)	7–**28**	(Portugal) **Sport Lisboa e Benfica**	Olympic Pool, Alba Iulia; Referees: Peden Jeremie (FRA), Jakub Necas (CZE)
7 November 2024; 17:00	Report	Score by quarters: 1–**8**, 3–**6**, 1–**6**, 2–**8**			Olympic Pool, Alba Iulia; Referees: Peden Jeremie (FRA), Jakub Necas (CZE)
7 November 2024; 17:00	Report	Milenkovic, Marinkovic 2	**Goals**	Macleod 7	Olympic Pool, Alba Iulia; Referees: Peden Jeremie (FRA), Jakub Necas (CZE)

7 November 2024; 19:00	Report	**CSM Unirea Alba Iulia** (Romania)	**12**–9	(Germany) SSV Esslingen	Olympic Pool, Alba Iulia; Referees: Soma Kovacs (HUN), Carla Martin (ESP)
7 November 2024; 19:00	Report	Score by quarters: **5**–1, 4–**5**, 1–1, 2–2			Olympic Pool, Alba Iulia; Referees: Soma Kovacs (HUN), Carla Martin (ESP)
7 November 2024; 19:00	Report	Yanisbel Victoria 3	**Goals**	Dzaja 4	Olympic Pool, Alba Iulia; Referees: Soma Kovacs (HUN), Carla Martin (ESP)

8 November 2024; 10:00	Report	Galatasaray Zena (Turkey)	8–**12**	(Portugal) **Sport Lisboa e Benfica**	Olympic Pool, Alba Iulia; Referees: Peden Jeremie (FRA), Jakub Necas (CZE)
8 November 2024; 10:00	Report	Score by quarters: 0–**2**, **3**–1, 2–**4**, 3–**5**			Olympic Pool, Alba Iulia; Referees: Peden Jeremie (FRA), Jakub Necas (CZE)
8 November 2024; 10:00	Report	Mihailovic 3	**Goals**	Silva Lousa 6	Olympic Pool, Alba Iulia; Referees: Peden Jeremie (FRA), Jakub Necas (CZE)

8 November 2024; 12:00	Report	**SSV Esslingen** (Germany)	**26**–3	(Serbia) ZVK Crvena Zvezda	Olympic Pool, Alba Iulia; Referees: Carla Martin (ESP), Soma Kovacs (HUN)
8 November 2024; 12:00	Report	Score by quarters: **6**–0, **4**–2, **8**–1, **8**–0			Olympic Pool, Alba Iulia; Referees: Carla Martin (ESP), Soma Kovacs (HUN)
8 November 2024; 12:00	Report	Haas 6	**Goals**	Trbanos 2	Olympic Pool, Alba Iulia; Referees: Carla Martin (ESP), Soma Kovacs (HUN)

8 November 2024; 17:00	Report	**Galatasaray Zena** (Turkey)	**10**–8	(Romania) CSM Unirea Alba Iulia	Olympic Pool, Alba Iulia; Referees: Soma Kovacs (HUN), Peden Jeremie (FRA)
8 November 2024; 17:00	Report	Score by quarters: 3–3, 3–3, **4**–2, 0–0			Olympic Pool, Alba Iulia; Referees: Soma Kovacs (HUN), Peden Jeremie (FRA)
8 November 2024; 17:00	Report	Burali 5	**Goals**	Cecilia, Virtosu 3	Olympic Pool, Alba Iulia; Referees: Soma Kovacs (HUN), Peden Jeremie (FRA)

8 November 2024; 19:00	Report	**Sport Lisboa e Benfica** (Portugal)	**11**–10	(Germany) SSV Esslingen	Olympic Pool, Alba Iulia; Referees: Jakub Necas (CZE), Carla Martin (ESP)
8 November 2024; 19:00	Report	Score by quarters: **2**–0, **4**–2, 1–**4**, 4–4			Olympic Pool, Alba Iulia; Referees: Jakub Necas (CZE), Carla Martin (ESP)
8 November 2024; 19:00	Report	Macleod 6	**Goals**	Haas, Sopiadou 3	Olympic Pool, Alba Iulia; Referees: Jakub Necas (CZE), Carla Martin (ESP)

9 November 2024; 17:00	Report	ZVK Crvena Zvezda (Serbia)	10–**15**	(Turkey) **Galatasaray Zena**	Olympic Pool, Alba Iulia; Referees: Peden Jeremie (FRA), Carla Martin (ESP)
9 November 2024; 17:00	Report	Score by quarters: 1–**4**, 4–4, 2–2, 3–**5**			Olympic Pool, Alba Iulia; Referees: Peden Jeremie (FRA), Carla Martin (ESP)
9 November 2024; 17:00	Report	Ribic 3	**Goals**	Benekou 6	Olympic Pool, Alba Iulia; Referees: Peden Jeremie (FRA), Carla Martin (ESP)

9 November 2024; 19:00	Report	**Sport Lisboa e Benfica** (Portugal)	**13**–11	(Romania) CSM Unirea Alba Iulia	Olympic Pool, Alba Iulia; Referees: Jakub Necas (CZE), Soma Kovacs (HUN)
9 November 2024; 19:00	Report	Score by quarters: 2–2, **3**–1, 3–**4**, 0–**1** PSO: **5**–3			Olympic Pool, Alba Iulia; Referees: Jakub Necas (CZE), Soma Kovacs (HUN)
9 November 2024; 19:00	Report	Macleod 5	**Goals**	Cecilia 3	Olympic Pool, Alba Iulia; Referees: Jakub Necas (CZE), Soma Kovacs (HUN)

10 November 2024; 10:00	Report	**Galatasaray Zena** (Turkey)	**10**–8	(Germany) SSV Esslingen	Olympic Pool, Alba Iulia; Referees: Soma Kovacs (HUN), Carla Martin (ESP)
10 November 2024; 10:00	Report	Score by quarters: **3**–0, **2**–1, 4–4, 1–**3**			Olympic Pool, Alba Iulia; Referees: Soma Kovacs (HUN), Carla Martin (ESP)
10 November 2024; 10:00	Report	Benekou 4	**Goals**	Petiki 3	Olympic Pool, Alba Iulia; Referees: Soma Kovacs (HUN), Carla Martin (ESP)

10 November 2024; 12:00	Report	**CSM Unirea Alba Iulia** (Romania)	**22**–4	(Serbia) ZVK Crvena Zvezda	Olympic Pool, Alba Iulia; Referees: Peden Jeremie (FRA), Jakub Necas (CZE)
10 November 2024; 12:00	Report	Score by quarters: **5**–2, **5**–0, **5**–1, **7**–1			Olympic Pool, Alba Iulia; Referees: Peden Jeremie (FRA), Jakub Necas (CZE)
10 November 2024; 12:00	Report	Novacean 4	**Goals**	Jankovic 2	Olympic Pool, Alba Iulia; Referees: Peden Jeremie (FRA), Jakub Necas (CZE)

== Qualification round II ==
In the qualification round II, teams play in a round robin format. The top 2 in each group advance to the final four.

=== Draw ===
The draw was on 11 November 2024. The seeded and unseeded clubs consist of the teams that finished first and second in the previous round respectively. The only restriction was that clubs from the same group in the previous round could not be drawn against each other. H indicates which club is hosting the groups. Teams in bold advanced to the final four.

Pot 1	Pot 2
(Turkey) **Izmir BSB Spor** (Croatia) Jadran Split (Croatia) **ŽAVK Mladost** (Portugal) Sport Lisboa e Benfica	(Serbia) **VK Vojvodina** **(H)** (Germany) SV Blau-Weiss Bochum (United Kingdom) Otter Swimming Club (Turkey) **Galatasaray Zena** **(H)**

=== Group A ===
Held in Istanbul, Turkey

Pos	Team	Pld	W	PSW	PSL	L	GF	GA	GD	Pts	Qualification	(Turkey) IZM	(Turkey) GAL	(Croatia) JAD	(United Kingdom) OTT
1	(Turkey) Izmir BSB Spor	3	3	0	0	0	43	23	+20	**9**	Final four	—	—	12–9	19–4
2	(Turkey) Galatasaray Zena (H)	3	2	0	0	1	50	24	+26	**6**	Final four	10–12	—	14–9	26–3
3	(Croatia) Jadran Split	3	1	0	0	2	34	33	+1	**3**		—	—	—	16–7
4	(United Kingdom) Otter Swimming Club	3	0	0	0	3	14	61	−47	**0**		—	—	—	—

Source: European Aquatics
(H) Host

6 December 2024; 18:30	Report	Galatasaray Zena (Turkey)	10–**12**	(Turkey) **Izmir BSB Spor**	Galatasaray Kalamış Facilities, Istanbul; Referees: Eurico Silva (POR), Ivanka Krstonosic Rakovic (SRB)
6 December 2024; 18:30	Report	Score by quarters: 2–2, 2–**3**, 3–3, 3–**4**			Galatasaray Kalamış Facilities, Istanbul; Referees: Eurico Silva (POR), Ivanka Krstonosic Rakovic (SRB)
6 December 2024; 18:30	Report	Mihailovic, Benekou 3	**Goals**	Jackovich 5	Galatasaray Kalamış Facilities, Istanbul; Referees: Eurico Silva (POR), Ivanka Krstonosic Rakovic (SRB)

6 December 2024; 20:30	Report	**Jadran Split** (Croatia)	**16**–7	(United Kingdom) Otter Swimming Club	Galatasaray Kalamış Facilities, Istanbul; Referees: Nikolett Sajben (HUN), Anne Grandin (FRA)
6 December 2024; 20:30	Report	Score by quarters: **4**–1, **2**–1, **8**–2, 2–**3**			Galatasaray Kalamış Facilities, Istanbul; Referees: Nikolett Sajben (HUN), Anne Grandin (FRA)
6 December 2024; 20:30	Report	Butic 6	**Goals**	three players 2	Galatasaray Kalamış Facilities, Istanbul; Referees: Nikolett Sajben (HUN), Anne Grandin (FRA)

7 December 2024; 18:00	Report	**Galatasaray Zena** (Turkey)	**26**–3	(United Kingdom) Otter Swimming Club	Galatasaray Kalamış Facilities, Istanbul; Referees: Ivanka Krstonosic Rakovic (SRB), Anne Grandin (FRA)
7 December 2024; 18:00	Report	Score by quarters: **9**–1, **10**–0, **4**–1, **3**–1			Galatasaray Kalamış Facilities, Istanbul; Referees: Ivanka Krstonosic Rakovic (SRB), Anne Grandin (FRA)
7 December 2024; 18:00	Report	Benekou 6	**Goals**	Dean 3	Galatasaray Kalamış Facilities, Istanbul; Referees: Ivanka Krstonosic Rakovic (SRB), Anne Grandin (FRA)

7 December 2024; 20:00	Report	**Izmir BSB Spor** (Turkey)	**12**–9	(Croatia) Jadran Split	Galatasaray Kalamış Facilities, Istanbul; Referees: Nikolett Sajben (HUN), Eurico Silva (POR)
7 December 2024; 20:00	Report	Score by quarters: 1–**3**, **4**–0, 2–2, **5**–4			Galatasaray Kalamış Facilities, Istanbul; Referees: Nikolett Sajben (HUN), Eurico Silva (POR)
7 December 2024; 20:00	Report	Kus 5	**Goals**	Butic 5	Galatasaray Kalamış Facilities, Istanbul; Referees: Nikolett Sajben (HUN), Eurico Silva (POR)

8 December 2024; 10:00	Report	**Izmir BSB Spor** (Turkey)	**19**–4	(United Kingdom) Otter Swimming Club	Galatasaray Kalamış Facilities, Istanbul; Referees: Anne Grandin (FRA), Eurico Silva (POR)
8 December 2024; 10:00	Report	Score by quarters: **6**–1, **6**–0, **4**–1, **3**–2			Galatasaray Kalamış Facilities, Istanbul; Referees: Anne Grandin (FRA), Eurico Silva (POR)
8 December 2024; 10:00	Report	Kus 7	**Goals**	Day 2	Galatasaray Kalamış Facilities, Istanbul; Referees: Anne Grandin (FRA), Eurico Silva (POR)

8 December 2024; 12:00	Report	**Galatasaray Zena** (Turkey)	**14**–9	(Croatia) Jadran Split	Galatasaray Kalamış Facilities, Istanbul; Referees: Ivan Rakovic (SRB), Nikolett Sajben (HUN)
8 December 2024; 12:00	Report	Score by quarters: **6**–0, 3–**6**, **3**–2, **2**–1			Galatasaray Kalamış Facilities, Istanbul; Referees: Ivan Rakovic (SRB), Nikolett Sajben (HUN)
8 December 2024; 12:00	Report	Burali, Mihailovic 4	**Goals**	Butic 5	Galatasaray Kalamış Facilities, Istanbul; Referees: Ivan Rakovic (SRB), Nikolett Sajben (HUN)

=== Group B ===
Held in Vojvodina, Serbia

Pos	Team	Pld	W	PSW	PSL	L	GF	GA	GD	Pts	Qualification	(Serbia) VOJ	(Croatia) MLA	(Germany) BOC	(Portugal) BEN
1	(Serbia) VK Vojvodina (H)	3	3	0	0	0	43	25	+18	**9**	Final four	—	11–6	19–8	13–11
2	(Croatia) ŽAVK Mladost	3	1	1	0	1	30	33	−3	**5**	Final four	—	—	15–14 (Note: Match ended 12–12. ŽAVK Mladost won 3–2 on penalties.)	12–10
3	(Germany) SV Blau-Weiss Bochum	3	1	0	1	1	35	41	−6	**4**		—	—	—	15–10
4	(Portugal) Sport Lisboa e Benfica	3	0	0	0	3	31	40	−9	**0**		—	—	—	—

Source: European Aquatics
(H) Host

6 December 2024; 18:00	Report	**VK Vojvodina** (Serbia)	**19**–8	(Germany) SV Blau-Weiss Bochum	Slana Bara Sports Center, Novi Sad; Referees: Martina Kunikova (SVK), Maxim Gerasimov (GBR)
6 December 2024; 18:00	Report	Score by quarters: **7**–1, **4**–2, **5**–3, **3**–2			Slana Bara Sports Center, Novi Sad; Referees: Martina Kunikova (SVK), Maxim Gerasimov (GBR)
6 December 2024; 18:00	Report	Amliaeva 6	**Goals**	three players 2	Slana Bara Sports Center, Novi Sad; Referees: Martina Kunikova (SVK), Maxim Gerasimov (GBR)

6 December 2024; 20:00	Report	**ŽAVK Mladost** (Croatia)	**12**–10	(Portugal) Sport Lisboa e Benfica	Slana Bara Sports Center, Novi Sad; Referees: Maria Daskalopoulou (GRE), Ilkin Cakmakoglu (TUR)
6 December 2024; 20:00	Report	Score by quarters: 3–3, **1**–0, **5**–3, 3–**4**			Slana Bara Sports Center, Novi Sad; Referees: Maria Daskalopoulou (GRE), Ilkin Cakmakoglu (TUR)
6 December 2024; 20:00	Report	Rozic 4	**Goals**	Macleod 4	Slana Bara Sports Center, Novi Sad; Referees: Maria Daskalopoulou (GRE), Ilkin Cakmakoglu (TUR)

7 December 2024; 18:00	Report	**VK Vojvodina** (Serbia)	**11**–6	(Croatia) ŽAVK Mladost	Slana Bara Sports Center, Novi Sad; Referees: Maria Daskalopoulou (GRE), Martina Kunikova (SVK)
7 December 2024; 18:00	Report	Score by quarters: **3**–1, **2**–1, 3–3, **3**–1			Slana Bara Sports Center, Novi Sad; Referees: Maria Daskalopoulou (GRE), Martina Kunikova (SVK)
7 December 2024; 18:00	Report	Savchenko 5	**Goals**	Rozic 5	Slana Bara Sports Center, Novi Sad; Referees: Maria Daskalopoulou (GRE), Martina Kunikova (SVK)

7 December 2024; 20:00	Report	**SV Blau-Weiss Bochum** (Germany)	**15**–10	(Portugal) Sport Lisboa e Benfica	Slana Bara Sports Center, Novi Sad; Referees: Maxim Gerasimov (GBR), Ilkin Cakmakoglu (TUR)
7 December 2024; 20:00	Report	Score by quarters: **4**–3, **4**–1, **4**–0, 3–**6**			Slana Bara Sports Center, Novi Sad; Referees: Maxim Gerasimov (GBR), Ilkin Cakmakoglu (TUR)
7 December 2024; 20:00	Report	Fry 6	**Goals**	Pereira Da Mata De B 4	Slana Bara Sports Center, Novi Sad; Referees: Maxim Gerasimov (GBR), Ilkin Cakmakoglu (TUR)

8 December 2024; 10:00	Report	**ŽAVK Mladost** (Croatia)	**15**–14	(Germany) SV Blau-Weiss Bochum	Slana Bara Sports Center, Novi Sad; Referees: Martina Kunikova (SVK), Ilkin Cakmakoglu (TUR)
8 December 2024; 10:00	Report	Score by quarters: **4**–0, 4–4, 3–3, 1–**5** PSO: **3**–2			Slana Bara Sports Center, Novi Sad; Referees: Martina Kunikova (SVK), Ilkin Cakmakoglu (TUR)
8 December 2024; 10:00	Report	Rozic 6	**Goals**	Fry 10	Slana Bara Sports Center, Novi Sad; Referees: Martina Kunikova (SVK), Ilkin Cakmakoglu (TUR)

8 December 2024; 12:00	Report	**VK Vojvodina** (Serbia)	**13**–11	(Portugal) Sport Lisboa e Benfica	Slana Bara Sports Center, Novi Sad; Referees: Maria Daskalopoulou (GRE), Maxim Gerasimov (GBR)
8 December 2024; 12:00	Report	Score by quarters: **3**–2, 3–3, **5**–2, 2–**4**			Slana Bara Sports Center, Novi Sad; Referees: Maria Daskalopoulou (GRE), Maxim Gerasimov (GBR)
8 December 2024; 12:00	Report	three players 3	**Goals**	Silva Lousa 4	Slana Bara Sports Center, Novi Sad; Referees: Maria Daskalopoulou (GRE), Maxim Gerasimov (GBR)

== Final four ==
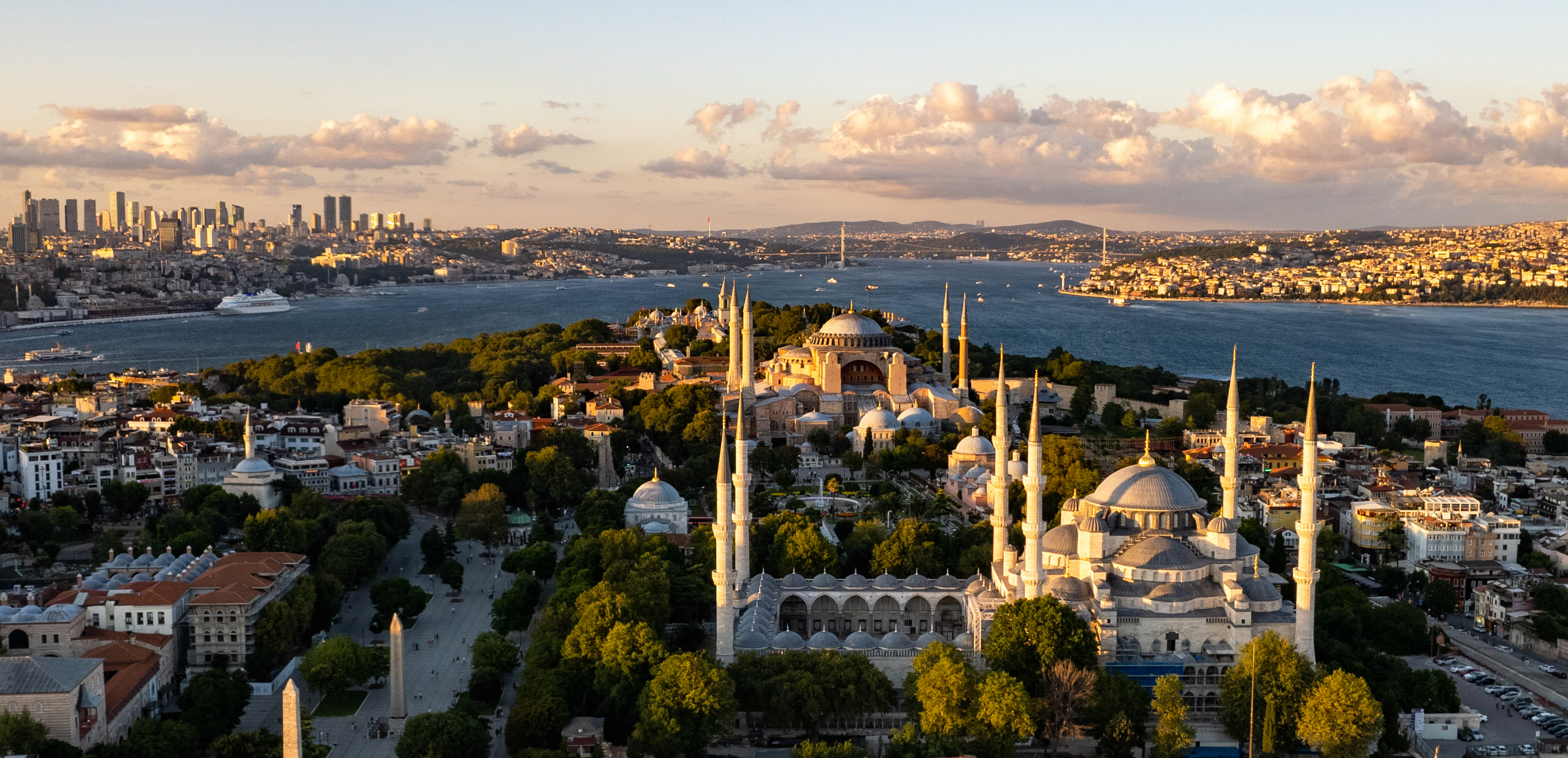
The Istanbul Metropolitan Municipality Cemal Kamaci Sports Complex in Istanbul hosted the final four.

On 18 January 2025, European Aquatics announced that Galatasaray Zena would be the hosting club for the final four. The final was at the Istanbul Metropolitan Municipality Cemal Kamaci Sports Complex in Istanbul.

Semifinals
(Turkey) Izmir BSB Spor	14
(Croatia) ŽAVK Mladost	8
(Serbia) VK Vojvodina	8
(Turkey) Galatasaray Zena	13

Final
(Turkey) Izmir BSB Spor	9
(Turkey) Galatasaray Zena	8
Third place
(Croatia) ŽAVK Mladost	15
(Serbia) VK Vojvodina	9

=== Semifinals ===
22 February 2025; 18:00	Report	Izmir BSB Spor (Turkey)	14–8	(Croatia) ŽAVK Mladost	Cemal Kamaci Sports Complex, Istanbul; Referees: Alessia Ferrari (ITA), Marieke Van Der Berg (NED)
22 February 2025; 18:00	Report	Score by quarters: 5–2, 3–1, 3–2, 3–3			Cemal Kamaci Sports Complex, Istanbul; Referees: Alessia Ferrari (ITA), Marieke Van Der Berg (NED)
22 February 2025; 18:00	Report	Jackovich, Kus 3	Goals	three players 2	Cemal Kamaci Sports Complex, Istanbul; Referees: Alessia Ferrari (ITA), Marieke Van Der Berg (NED)

22 February 2025; 16:00	Report	VK Vojvodina (Serbia)	8–13	(Turkey) Galatasaray Zena	Cemal Kamaci Sports Complex, Istanbul; Referees: Marta Cabanas (ESP), Nikolett Sajben (HUN)
22 February 2025; 16:00	Report	Score by quarters: 2–2, 2–3, 2–5, 2–3			Cemal Kamaci Sports Complex, Istanbul; Referees: Marta Cabanas (ESP), Nikolett Sajben (HUN)
22 February 2025; 16:00	Report	Trmcic 3	Goals	Ivanova 6	Cemal Kamaci Sports Complex, Istanbul; Referees: Marta Cabanas (ESP), Nikolett Sajben (HUN)

=== Third place game ===
23 February 2025; 10:00	Report	ŽAVK Mladost (Croatia)	15–9	(Serbia) VK Vojvodina	Cemal Kamaci Sports Complex, Istanbul; Referees: Marieke Van Der Berg (NED), Nikolett Sajben (HUN)
23 February 2025; 10:00	Report	Score by quarters: 3–3, 2–4, 6–2, 4–0			Cemal Kamaci Sports Complex, Istanbul; Referees: Marieke Van Der Berg (NED), Nikolett Sajben (HUN)
23 February 2025; 10:00	Report	Glas 5	Goals	Trmcic, Amliaeva 2	Cemal Kamaci Sports Complex, Istanbul; Referees: Marieke Van Der Berg (NED), Nikolett Sajben (HUN)

=== Final ===
23 February 2025; 12:00	Report	Izmir BSB Spor (Turkey)	9–8	(Turkey) Galatasaray Zena	Cemal Kamaci Sports Complex, Istanbul; Referees: Alessia Ferrari (ITA), Marta Cabanas (ESP)
23 February 2025; 12:00	Report	Score by quarters: 0–2, 5–2, 1–1, 3–3			Cemal Kamaci Sports Complex, Istanbul; Referees: Alessia Ferrari (ITA), Marta Cabanas (ESP)
23 February 2025; 12:00	Report	Jackovich 4	Goals	Benekou 3	Cemal Kamaci Sports Complex, Istanbul; Referees: Alessia Ferrari (ITA), Marta Cabanas (ESP)

2024–25 European Aquatics Women's Challenger Cup Champions

Izmir BSB Spor
Second title

== See also ==
- 2024–25 European Aquatics Champions League
- 2024–25 European Aquatics Euro Cup
- 2024–25 European Aquatics Challenger Cup
- 2024 European Aquatics Super Cup
- 2024–25 European Aquatics Women's Champions League
- 2024–25 European Aquatics Women's Euro Cup
- 2024 European Aquatics Women's Super Cup
