= Michigan Wolverines women's water polo =

Michigan Wolverines Women's Water Polo
- Founded: 2001
- University: University of Michigan
- Head coach: Cassandra Churnside (1st season)
- Conference: Collegiate Water Polo Association
- Location: Ann Arbor, Michigan, US
- Home pool: Canham Natatorium
- Nickname: Wolverines
- Colors: Maize and blue

NCAA Tournament Final Four
- 2016

NCAA Tournament Quarterfinals
- 2017, 2018, 2019, 2021, 2022

NCAA Tournament Appearances
- 2002, 2005, 2008, 2009, 2010, 2016, 2017, 2018, 2019,2021, 2022

Conference Champions
- 2002, 2005, 2008, 2009, 2010, 2016, 2017, 2018, 2019, 2021, 2022

Conference Division Season Champions
- 2002, 2003, 2004, 2005, 2006, 2007, 2008, 2009, 2010, 2011, 2012

The Michigan Wolverines women's water polo team represents the University of Michigan in National Collegiate Athletic Association (NCAA) Division I competition. College water polo became a varsity sport at the University of Michigan in 2001. Marcelo Leonardi was the head coach since 2015. Coach Churnside arrived in Michigan to coach the 2023 season, after being an assistant coach at Harvard University.
