= İzmir Büyükşehir Belediyesi GSK (women's water polo) =

Turkish women's water polo team

İzmir Büyükşehir Belediye Gençlik ve Spor Kulübü Kadın Sutopu Takımı (English: İzmir Metropolitan Municipality Youth and Sports Club Women's Water Polo Team), commonly referred to as İzmir BB GSK Kadın Sutopu Takımı (İzmir BB GSK Women's Water Polo Team), is the women's water polo team of the multi-sports club İzmir Büyükşehir Belediyesi GSK based in İzmir, Turkey. The team plays the home matches at Celal Atik Swimming Pool in Konak, İzmir.

== History ==
The team finished the 2022–23 season of the Turkish Women's Water Polo First League, at which eight teams competed, as champion after play-offs. They were entitled for the first time to take part at the LEN Women's Challenger Cup. They became champion at the 2023–24 Challenger Cup at Zagreb, Croatia defeating Serbian team ZVK Crvena Zvezda in the final.

== Current squad ==
As of 26 November 2023.

No.	Nat.	Player	Birth Date	Position	L/R
1	(Turkey)	Elif Dilara Aydınlık	19 July 1999 (age 26)	Goalkeeper	R
2	(Turkey)	Yağmur Şimşek	8 March 2005 (age 21)		
2	(Turkey)	Zeynep Visha	3 March 2003 (age 23)	Wing	R
3	(Turkey)	Dilara Buralı	27 March 2000 (age 26)	Centre Forward	R
4	(Turkey)	Zeynep Hepkorucu	1 July 2006 (age 19)		
5	(Turkey)	Zeynep Simay Erdem	10 May 2001 (age 25)		
6	(Turkey)	Hamiyet Süzmeçelik	16 January 2006 (age 20)		
7	(Turkey)	Eylül Arıcı	26 December 2002 (age 23)		
8	(Turkey)	Selina Çolak	26 December 2002 (age 23)	Centre Forward	R
9	(Turkey)	Duru Kaleağası	6 June 2005 (age 21)		
10	(Turkey)	Kübra Kuş	9 November 1994 (age 31)	Center Forward	R
11	(Turkey)	Hanzade Dabbağ	22 January 2007 (age 19)		
12	(Australia)	Madeleine Kate Steere	15 September 1996 (age 29)	Centre Back	R
13	(Turkey)	Ceren Bulut	21 August 2003 (age 22)	Goalkeeper	
	(Turkey)	Gülen Selin Yüksel	18 July 2007 (age 18)		

== Staff ==
As of 26 November 2023.

- Hüseyin Egeli, Chairman
- Soykan Üstünkar, Head coach
- Uğurcan Kocataş, Trainer

== Honours ==
=== European competitions ===
LEN Women's Challenger Cup
Champions (2): 2023–24, 2024–25.

=== Domestic competitions ===
Turkish Women's Water Polo First League
Champions (1): 2022–23.

Women's Water Polo Turkish Cup
Champions (1): 2021.

Turkish Women's U-19 Water Polo League

. Champions (1): 2022.

Women's U-19 Water Polo Federation Cup
Runners-up (1): 2021.

Girls' U-17 Water Polo Federation Cup
Champions (1): 2021.

Girls' U-15 Water Polo Federation Cup
Runners-up (1): 2021.
