= ŽVK Partizan =

Ženski vaterpolo klub Partizan
- Founded: 2009
- Based in: Belgrade, Serbia
- Arena: Sport Center Banjica
- Colors
- Head coach: Aleksandar Krstonošić

Ženski vaterpolo klub Partizan (Serbian Cyrillic: Женски ватерполо клуб Партизан) is a female water polo club from Belgrade, Serbia. ŽVK Partizan is one of the sport clubs in Serbia that are part of sport society Partizan. Partizan's home terrain is the pool which is part of the Sportski centar Voždovac na Banjici complex. The club is supported by Grobari, fans of all sport clubs competing under the name of Partizan Belgrade.

== Honours ==
- National Cup: 1
  - 2012–13

== See also ==
- VK Partizan
