= Kübra Kuş =

Turkish water polo player

Personal information
- Nationality: Turkish
- Born: 9 November 1994 (age 31)
- Height: 170 cm (67 in)
- Weight: 78 kg (172 lb)

Sport
- Sport: Water polo
- Handedness: Right
- Position: Centre forward
- Current club: Ege Water Sports and Tennis Club
- Number: 10
National team
- Years: Team
- 2016: Turkey

Kübra Kuş (born 9 November 1994) is a Turkish female water polo player, playing at the centre forward position. She is part of the Turkey women's national water polo team. She competed at the 2016 Women's European Water Polo Championship.

She is a member of Ege Water Sports and Tennis Club and also played volleyball.

== Honours ==
=== International ===
LEN Women's Challenger Cup
Champions (1): 2023–24.
