= Sirens A.S.C. =

Aquatic Sports Club

Sirens ASC
- Founded: 1930; 96 years ago
- League: Maltese Waterpolo Premier League
- Based in: San Pawl il-Baħar
- Arena: Sirens, San Pawl il-Baħar.
- Colors
- Owner: Dr. Carmel Lino Vella
- President: Dr. Carmel Lino Vella
- Head coach: Mr. Ranko Perovic
- Manager: Mr. Sean Aquilina
- Championships: 8x Champions
- Local media: https://www.facebook.com/Sirenswaterpolo/
- Website: http://www.sirensasc.com/

Sirens Aquatic Sports Club is an aquatic sports club with over 500 fully paid up members, one of the largest of its kind in Malta. The club is run by an elected committee which devolves some of its duties and tasks to various sub-committees. All committee and sub-committee members are volunteers and receive no payment for their work.

The statute of the club lays down the scope for the existence of the same club which is:

- The promotion of waterpolo, swimming and other aquatic sports.
- The observance of the rules of the clubs and those organizations to which the club is affiliated.)
- The promotion of a sporting spirit, particularly amongst its young athletes.
- The development and maintenance of the club premises and facilities

For many years Sirens ASC has been in the forefront of Maltese aquatic sports and has faced many challenges that would have defeated a less strong minded group of people. In 1998 the club premises were destroyed by a vicious storm but they were not only rebuilt within a few months to higher standard but the club went on to develop what is now Malta's number one private water sports facility.

Financially the club is dependent on the rentals of its facilities, sponsors, donors and its members. Over the past fifty years the club has grown from a humble wooden shack on a barren rock by the sea to a fully fledged facility used by thousands of patrons every summer.

This has been made possible by the work of a group of people who dedicate free time to the service of the club, its members and the local community and to its president Dr. Vella who dedicates his time and money towards the club

== Premises ==
On 8 December 1988, the clubhouse was destroyed in a storm, together with trophies and club records. The clubhouse was then rebuilt and refurbished several times, by club president, Lino Vella and club vice president, John Farrugia.

On 6 August 2017, the club launched a €10,000,000 investment to revamp the club's premises and facilities, to modernize and add 2 swimming pools (50x25 outdoor and 25x13 indoor), add a state of the art gym,2 fully equipped restaurants as well as club offices. The construction of the Sirens Pool was completed in September 2021 ready to be used and the club's indoor pool and state of the art gym were opened on 1 April 2023.

== Front office ==
- President: Dr Carmel Lino Vella
- V.President: Mr. John Farrugia
- CEO : Mr. Sean Aquilina
- Secretary : Mr. Arthur Perici
- Treausurer: Mr. Kristian Montfort
- Members : Sven Xerri, Walter Degiorgio, Patrick Xuereb, John Napier, Paul Micallef

== Coaching staff ==
- Head Coach : Ranko Perovic (Montenegro)
- Asst.Coach : Anthony Farrugia (Malta)
- Technical Officer : Kris Montfort (Malta)
- Team Manager : John Napier (Malta)
- Team Physio: Max Borg (Malta)
- Youth Coach : Igor Vukanovic (Serbia)
- Development Coach : Erik Valter (Hungary)
- Head Women's Coach: Aurelien Cousin (Malta)
- Head Women's Asst. Coach :Kris Montfort (Malta)
- Women's Team Manager : Kris Montfort (Malta)

== First team ==
Season 24/25

- (Malta) Thomas Micallef (GK)
- (Malta) Matthew Bonello Du Puis (GK)
- (Malta) Joseph Parnis (GK)
- (Malta) Matthias Azzopardi
- (Malta) Peter Borg (C)
- (Malta) Isaiah Riolo
- (Malta) Matthew Sciberras
- (Malta) Jerome Zerafa Gregory
- (Malta) Mattias Ortoleva
- (Malta) Jake Cachia
- (Malta) Zach Mizzi
- (Malta) Paul Serracino
- (Malta) Gianni Farrugia
- (Malta) Kydon Agius
- (Malta) William Ruggier
- (Malta) Thomas Perici Ferrante

== Notable former foreign players ==
- (Netherlands) Jan Evert Veer
- (Hungary) Tamás Märcz
- (Italy) Francesco Porzio
- (Hungary) Zsolt Varga
- (Socialist Federal Republic of Yugoslavia) Predrag Zimonjić
- (Hungary) Árpád Babay
- (Hungary) Csaba Kiss
- (Italy) Christian Presciutti
- (Canada) Nicolas Constantin Bicari
- (Spain) Sergi Mora Belmonte
- (Italy) Valentino Gallo
- (Italy) Pietro Figlioli
- (Hungary) Mátyás Pásztor
- (Russia) Daniil Merkulov

== Notable coaches ==
- (Malta) John Farrugia
- (Malta) Dirk Dowling
- (Italy) Sandro Campagna
- (Italy) Marco Baldineti
- (Italy) Paolo De Crescenzo
- (Italy) Marco Risso
- (Croatia) Sergio Afrić
- (Serbia) Marko Pantovic
- (North Macedonia) Sasko Popovski
- (North Macedonia) Pino Dragojevic
- (Serbia) Marko Orlovic
- (Serbia) Igor Vukanovic
- (North Macedonia) Ranko Perović
