= 2025–26 European Aquatics Women's Euro Cup qualification round =

- 2025–26

Tournament information
- Sport: Water polo
- Date: 17–19 October 2025
- Host(s): (Croatia) Zagreb (Netherlands) Ede (Serbia) Vojvodina
- Teams: 9 (from 9 countries)
- Website: Official website

Tournament statistics
- Matches played: 9

The 2025–26 European Aquatics Women's Euro Cup qualification round was played between 17 and 19 October 2025 to determine the 4 teams advancing to the group stage of the 2025–26 European Aquatics Women's Euro Cup.

== Format ==
The 9 teams were place into three groups of three teams. In each group, teams will play against each other once in a round-robin format. The group winners plus the best runners-up advance to the group stage.

Teams are ranked according to points (3 points for a win, 2 points for a penalty shootout win, 1 point for a penalty shootout loss, 0 points for a loss), and if tied on points, the following tiebreaking criteria are applied, in the order given, to determine the rankings:

- Points in head-to-head matches among tied teams;
- Goal difference in head-to-head matches among tied teams;
- Goals scored in head-to-head matches among tied teams;
- Goal difference in all group matches;
- Goals scored in all group matches.

== Draw ==
External videos
- 2025–26 European Aquatics Women's Euro Cup qualification round – Draw
- Draw

The draw was on 28 July 2025 in Zagreb, Croatia. (H) indicates which clubs is hosting a group. The seeding is based on the club rankings.

Key to colours
Teams advancing to group stage

Pot 1
Team	Rank	Points
(Netherlands) Polar Bears (H)	26	6,455
(Greece) Panionios GSS	29	4,920
(Hungary) III. Kerületi TVE (H)	31	4,920

Pot 2
Team	Rank	Points
(Croatia) ŽAVK Mladost (H)	32	4,660
(Serbia) VK Vojvodina (H)	34	3,790
(Turkey) Galatasaray Zena	36	3,375

Pot 3
Team	Rank	Points
(Israel) Hapoel Yokneam	39	2,905
(Spain) Zodiac CNAB	N/A	
(Italy) ASD Bogliasco 1951	N/A	

== Groups ==
=== Group A ===
- 17–19 October 2025, Zagreb, Croatia.

Pos	Team	Pld	W	PSW	PSL	L	GF	GA	GD	Pts	Qualification	ZOD	PAN	MLA
1	(Spain) Zodiac CNAB	2	2	0	0	0	32	12	+20	6	Group stage	—	—	18–4
2	(Greece) Panionios GSS	2	1	0	0	1	19	23	−4	3		8–14	—	—
3	(Croatia) ŽAVK Mladost (H)	2	0	0	0	2	13	29	−16	0		—	9–11	—

Source: European Aquatics Women's Euro Cup
(H) Host

17 October 2025; 20:45	Report	ŽAVK Mladost (Croatia)	9–11	(Greece) Panionios GSS	Bazen Mladost, Zagreb; Referees: Nikolett Sajben (HUN), Bregje de Jong (NED)
17 October 2025; 20:45	Report	Score by quarters: 2–3, 2–2, 2–3, 3–3			Bazen Mladost, Zagreb; Referees: Nikolett Sajben (HUN), Bregje de Jong (NED)
17 October 2025; 20:45	Report	Glas 6	Goals	Christodoulou-Out, Plevritou 3	Bazen Mladost, Zagreb; Referees: Nikolett Sajben (HUN), Bregje de Jong (NED)

18 October 2025; 18:00	Report	Zodiac CNAB (Spain)	18–4	(Croatia) ŽAVK Mladost	Bazen Mladost, Zagreb; Referees: Martina Kunikova (SVK), Bregje de Jong (NED)
18 October 2025; 18:00	Report	Score by quarters: 5–2, 3–0, 3–1, 7–1			Bazen Mladost, Zagreb; Referees: Martina Kunikova (SVK), Bregje de Jong (NED)
18 October 2025; 18:00	Report	Aznar Diez 6	Goals	Skelin 2	Bazen Mladost, Zagreb; Referees: Martina Kunikova (SVK), Bregje de Jong (NED)

19 October 2025; 11:30	Report	Panionios GSS (Greece)	8–14	(Spain) Zodiac CNAB	Bazen Mladost, Zagreb; Referees: Nikolett Sajben (HUN),, Martina Kunikova (SVK)
19 October 2025; 11:30	Report	Score by quarters: 2–5, 1–4, 4–1, 1–4			Bazen Mladost, Zagreb; Referees: Nikolett Sajben (HUN),, Martina Kunikova (SVK)
19 October 2025; 11:30	Report	Lampropoulou, Renner 2	Goals	five players 2	Bazen Mladost, Zagreb; Referees: Nikolett Sajben (HUN),, Martina Kunikova (SVK)

=== Group B ===
- 17–19 October 2025, Ede, Netherlands.

Pos	Team	Pld	W	PSW	PSL	L	GF	GA	GD	Pts	Qualification	POL	BOG	GAL
1	(Netherlands) Polar Bears (H)	2	2	0	0	0	32	15	+17	6	Group stage	—	10–9	22–6
2	(Italy) ASD Bogliasco 1951	2	1	0	0	1	36	15	+21	3		—	—	—
3	(Turkey) Galatasaray Zena	2	0	0	0	2	11	49	−38	0		—	5–27	—

Source: European Aquatics Women's Euro Cup
(H) Host

17 October 2025; 20:00	Report	Galatasaray Zena (Turkey)	5–27	(Italy) ASD Bogliasco 1951	Zwembad De Peppel, Ede; Referees: Nora Debreceni (HUN), Lea Saftic (CRO)
17 October 2025; 20:00	Report	Score by quarters: 1–7, 1–5, 2–5, 1–10			Zwembad De Peppel, Ede; Referees: Nora Debreceni (HUN), Lea Saftic (CRO)
17 October 2025; 20:00	Report	Yarayan 3	Goals	Bo 6	Zwembad De Peppel, Ede; Referees: Nora Debreceni (HUN), Lea Saftic (CRO)

18 October 2025; 18:00	Report	Polar Bears (Netherlands)	22–6	(Turkey) Galatasaray Zena	Zwembad De Peppel, Ede; Referees: Marina Martos Fernandez (ESP), Lea Saftic (CRO)
18 October 2025; 18:00	Report	Score by quarters: 6–1, 6–1, 4–1, 6–3			Zwembad De Peppel, Ede; Referees: Marina Martos Fernandez (ESP), Lea Saftic (CRO)
18 October 2025; 18:00	Report	Kleinlugtebeld 6	Goals	Temel, Yarayan 2	Zwembad De Peppel, Ede; Referees: Marina Martos Fernandez (ESP), Lea Saftic (CRO)

19 October 2025; 12:00	Report	Polar Bears (Netherlands)	10–9	(Italy) ASD Bogliasco 1951	Zwembad De Peppel, Ede; Referees: Marina Martos Fernandez (ESP), Nora Debreceni (HUN)
19 October 2025; 12:00	Report	Score by quarters: 3–1, 2–1, 3–3, 2–4			Zwembad De Peppel, Ede; Referees: Marina Martos Fernandez (ESP), Nora Debreceni (HUN)
19 October 2025; 12:00	Report	De Gier 3	Goals	Bianco 4	Zwembad De Peppel, Ede; Referees: Marina Martos Fernandez (ESP), Nora Debreceni (HUN)

=== Group C ===
- 17–19 October 2025, Vojvodina, Serbia.

Pos	Team	Pld	W	PSW	PSL	L	GF	GA	GD	Pts	Qualification	HAP	KER	VOJ
1	(Israel) Hapoel Yokneam	2	1	1	0	0	32	27	+5	5	Group stage	—	—	—
2	(Hungary) III. Kerületi TVE	2	1	0	1	0	32	30	+2	4	Group stage	19–20 (Note: Match ended 15–15, Hapoel Yokneam won 5–4 on penalties.)	—	—
3	(Serbia) VK Vojvodina (H)	2	0	0	0	2	18	25	−7	0		8–12	10–13	—

Source: European Aquatics Women's Euro Cup
(H) Host

17 October 2025; 19:00	Report	III. Keruleti TVE (Hungary)	19–20 (PSO)	(Israel) Hapoel Yoqneam	Slana Bara Sports Center, Novi Sad; Referees: Roberta Grillo (ITA), Ana Belen Perete Gonzalvo (ESP)
17 October 2025; 19:00	Report	Score by quarters: 2–5, 4–3, 4–4, 5–3 PSO: 4–5			Slana Bara Sports Center, Novi Sad; Referees: Roberta Grillo (ITA), Ana Belen Perete Gonzalvo (ESP)
17 October 2025; 19:00	Report	Raski 5	Goals	Luka 4	Slana Bara Sports Center, Novi Sad; Referees: Roberta Grillo (ITA), Ana Belen Perete Gonzalvo (ESP)

18 October 2025; 19:00	Report	VK Vojvodina (Serbia)	10–13	(Hungary) III. Keruleti TVE	Slana Bara Sports Center, Novi Sad; Referees: Roberta Grillo (ITA), Anne Grandin (FRA)
18 October 2025; 19:00	Report	Score by quarters: 2–3, 1–3, 4–2, 3–5			Slana Bara Sports Center, Novi Sad; Referees: Roberta Grillo (ITA), Anne Grandin (FRA)
18 October 2025; 19:00	Report	Tijana Lukic 3	Goals	three players 3	Slana Bara Sports Center, Novi Sad; Referees: Roberta Grillo (ITA), Anne Grandin (FRA)

19 October 2025; 19:00	Report	VK Vojvodina (Serbia)	8–12	(Israel) Hapoel Yoqneam	Slana Bara Sports Center, Novi Sad; Referees: Anne Grandin (FRA), Ana Belen Perete Gonzalvo (ESP)
19 October 2025; 19:00	Report	Score by quarters: 0–2, 4–3, 2–6, 2–1			Slana Bara Sports Center, Novi Sad; Referees: Anne Grandin (FRA), Ana Belen Perete Gonzalvo (ESP)
19 October 2025; 19:00	Report	three players 2	Goals	Levinshtein, Strugo 3	Slana Bara Sports Center, Novi Sad; Referees: Anne Grandin (FRA), Ana Belen Perete Gonzalvo (ESP)

=== Ranking of second-placed teams ===
Pos	Grp	Team	Pld	W	PSW	PSL	L	GF	GA	GD	Pts	Qualification
1	C	(Hungary) III. Kerületi TVE	2	1	0	1	0	32	30	+2	4	Group stage
2	B	(Italy) ASD Bogliasco 1951	2	1	0	0	1	36	15	+21	3	
3	A	(Greece) Panionios GSS	2	1	0	0	1	19	23	−4	3	

Source: European Aquatics Women's Euro Cup
Rules for classification: 1) points; 2) goal difference; 3) number of goals scored.

== See also ==
- 2025–26 European Aquatics Champions League
- 2025–26 European Aquatics Euro Cup
- 2025–26 European Aquatics Conference Cup
- 2025–26 European Aquatics Challenger Cup
- 2025 European Aquatics Super Cup
- 2025–26 European Aquatics Women's Champions League
- 2025–26 European Aquatics Women's Euro Cup
- 2025–26 European Aquatics Women's Conference Cup
- 2025–26 European Aquatics Women's Challenger Cup
- 2025 European Aquatics Women's Super Cup

Reference
Matchday 1
Matchday 2
Matchday 3
