= 2025–26 European Aquatics Women's Conference Cup qualification round II =

- 2025–26

Tournament information
- Sport: Water polo
- Date: 27 February – 1 March 2026
- Host(s): (Romania) Alba Iulia (Greece) Nea Smyrni (Serbia) Novi Sad (Turkey) Istanbul
- Teams: 13 (from 8 countries)
- Website: Official website

Tournament statistics
- Matches played: 15

The 2025–26 European Aquatics Women's Conference Cup qualification round II is played between 27 February and 1 March 2026 to determine the 8 teams advancing to the Final Eight of the 2025–26 European Aquatics Women's Conference Cup.

== Format ==
The 13 teams were place into four groups of three or four teams. In each group, teams will play against each other once in a round-robin format. The top two in each group advance to the next round.

Teams are ranked according to points (3 points for a win, 2 points for a penalty shootout win, 1 point for a penalty shootout loss, 0 points for a loss), and if tied on points, the following tiebreaking criteria are applied, in the order given, to determine the rankings:

- Points in head-to-head matches among tied teams;
- Goal difference in head-to-head matches among tied teams;
- Goals scored in head-to-head matches among tied teams;
- Goal difference in all group matches;
- Goals scored in all group matches.

== Draw ==
External videos
- 2025–26 European Aquatics Women's Conference Cup qualification round II – Draw
- Draw

The draw was on 19 November 2025 in Zagreb, Croatia. The clubs that in the same group in the previous round (in both Euro and Conference Cup) could not be drawn against each other. (H) indicates which clubs is hosting a group.

=== Seeding ===
The pots were decided by as follows

- Pot 1 consisted of the teams eliminated from Euro Cup qualification
- Pot 2 consisted of the group winners of the Conference Cup qualification round I
- Pot 3 consisted of the group runners-up of the Conference Cup qualification round I.

Key to colours
Teams advancing to Final Eight

Pot 1
Team
(Greece) Panionios GSS (H)
(Croatia) ŽAVK Mladost
(Italy) ASD Bogliasco 1951
(Turkey) Galatasaray Zena (H)
(Serbia) VK Vojvodina (H)

Pot 2
Team
(Spain) CN Sant Feliu
(Italy) Smile Cosenza Pallanuoto
(Spain) Tenerife Echeyde
(Greece) AC PAOK

Pot 3
Team
(Germany) SV Blau-Weiss
(Romania) CSM Unirea Alba Iulia (H)
(Italy) Brizz Nuoto
(Greece) NC Chania

== Groups ==
=== Group A ===
27 February – 1 March 2026, Alba Iulia, Romania.

Pos	Team	Pld	W	PSW	PSL	L	GF	GA	GD	Pts	Qualification	FEL	UNI	BOG
1	(Spain) CN Sant Feliu	2	1	1	0	0	26	18	+8	5	Advance to Final Eight	—	15–7	—
2	(Romania) CSM Unirea Alba Iulia (H)	2	1	0	0	1	15	22	−7	3	Advance to Final Eight	—	—	8–7
3	(Italy) ASD Bogliasco 1951	2	0	0	1	1	18	19	−1	1		17–18 (Note: Match ended 11–11. CN Sant Feliu won 7–6 on penalties.)	—	—

Source: European Aquatics Women's Conference Cup
(H) Host

27 February 2026; 18:00	Report	CSM Unirea Alba Iulia (Romania)	8–7	(Italy) ASD Bogliasco 1951	Olympic Pool, Alba Iulia; Referees: Adamantia Aikaterini Saravelaki (GRE), Dorottya Bors (HUN)
27 February 2026; 18:00	Report	Score by quarters: 0–1, 2–1, 2–2, 4–3			Olympic Pool, Alba Iulia; Referees: Adamantia Aikaterini Saravelaki (GRE), Dorottya Bors (HUN)
27 February 2026; 18:00	Report	Virtosu 3	Goals	Bianco 3	Olympic Pool, Alba Iulia; Referees: Adamantia Aikaterini Saravelaki (GRE), Dorottya Bors (HUN)

28 February 2026; 18:00	Report	ASD Bogliasco 1951 (Italy)	17–18 (PSO)	(Spain) CN Sant Feliu	Olympic Pool, Alba Iulia; Referees: Dorottya Bors (HUN), Stefana Stefanovic (SRB)
28 February 2026; 18:00	Report	Score by quarters: 3–2, 3–3, 2–0, 3–6 PSO: 6–7			Olympic Pool, Alba Iulia; Referees: Dorottya Bors (HUN), Stefana Stefanovic (SRB)
28 February 2026; 18:00	Report	Bianco, Hardy 3	Goals	Dueñas 4	Olympic Pool, Alba Iulia; Referees: Dorottya Bors (HUN), Stefana Stefanovic (SRB)

1 March 2026; 10:30	Report	CN Sant Feliu (Spain)	15–7	(Romania) CSM Unirea Alba Iulia	Olympic Pool, Alba Iulia; Referees: Adamantia Aikaterini Saravelaki (GRE), Stefana Stefanovic (SRB)
1 March 2026; 10:30	Report	Score by quarters: 3–2, 4–2, 6–0, 2–3			Olympic Pool, Alba Iulia; Referees: Adamantia Aikaterini Saravelaki (GRE), Stefana Stefanovic (SRB)
1 March 2026; 10:30	Report	Moreno 5	Goals	Nagy, Novacean 2	Olympic Pool, Alba Iulia; Referees: Adamantia Aikaterini Saravelaki (GRE), Stefana Stefanovic (SRB)

=== Group B ===
27 February – 1 March 2026, Nea Smyrni, Greece.

Pos	Team	Pld	W	PSW	PSL	L	GF	GA	GD	Pts	Qualification	COS	PAN	PAOK
1	(Italy) Smile Cosenza Pallanuoto	2	2	0	0	0	27	23	+4	6	Advance to Final Eight	—	—	—
2	(Greece) Panionios GSS (H)	2	1	0	0	1	27	24	+3	3	Advance to Final Eight	16–17	—	—
3	(Greece) AC PAOK	2	0	0	0	2	14	21	−7	0		7–10	7–11	—

Source: European Aquatics Women's Conference Cup
(H) Host

27 February 2026; 20:00	Report	Panionios GSS (Greece)	16–17	(Italy) Smile Cosenza Pallanuoto	Nea Smyrni Swimming Pool, Nea Smyrni; Referees: Connor Jukes (GBR), Lukasz Krol (POL)
27 February 2026; 20:00	Report	Score by quarters: 7–7, 2–4, 3–2, 4–4			Nea Smyrni Swimming Pool, Nea Smyrni; Referees: Connor Jukes (GBR), Lukasz Krol (POL)
27 February 2026; 20:00	Report	Bitsakou, M. Plevritou 5	Goals	Meijer 5	Nea Smyrni Swimming Pool, Nea Smyrni; Referees: Connor Jukes (GBR), Lukasz Krol (POL)

28 February 2026; 20:00	Report	AC PAOK (Greece)	7–10	(Italy) Smile Cosenza Pallanuoto	Nea Smyrni Swimming Pool, Nea Smyrni; Referees: Lukasz Krol (POL), Marko Matijevic (CRO)
28 February 2026; 20:00	Report	Score by quarters: 3–2, 3–1, 0–6, 1–1			Nea Smyrni Swimming Pool, Nea Smyrni; Referees: Lukasz Krol (POL), Marko Matijevic (CRO)
28 February 2026; 20:00	Report	M. Karipidou 4	Goals	Meijer, Morrone 3	Nea Smyrni Swimming Pool, Nea Smyrni; Referees: Lukasz Krol (POL), Marko Matijevic (CRO)

1 March 2025; 10:00	Report	AC PAOK (Greece)	7–11	(Greece) Panionios GSS	Nea Smyrni Swimming Pool, Nea Smyrni; Referees: Marko Matijevic (CRO), Connor Jukes (GBR)
1 March 2025; 10:00	Report	Score by quarters: 1–2, 1–3, 3–3, 2–3			Nea Smyrni Swimming Pool, Nea Smyrni; Referees: Marko Matijevic (CRO), Connor Jukes (GBR)
1 March 2025; 10:00	Report	M. Karipidou 4	Goals	Bitsakou, Papanastasiou 3	Nea Smyrni Swimming Pool, Nea Smyrni; Referees: Marko Matijevic (CRO), Connor Jukes (GBR)

=== Group C ===
27 February – 1 March 2026, Novi Sad, Serbia.

Pos	Team	Pld	W	PSW	PSL	L	GF	GA	GD	Pts	Qualification	TEN	CHA	NEV	BLA
1	(Spain) Tenerife Echeyde	3	3	0	0	0	50	32	+18	9	Advance to Final Eight	—	—	—	19–9
2	(Greece) NC Chania	3	1	0	0	2	42	41	+1	3 (Note: Head to head goal difference: NC Chania 3 Pts, +4 GD; VK Vojvodina 3 Pts, +1 GD; SV Blau-Weiss 3 Pts, −5 GD)	Advance to Final Eight	13–16	—	—	—
3	(Serbia) VK Vojvodina (H)	3	1	0	0	2	39	43	−4	3		10–15	14–12	—	15–16
4	(Germany) SV Blau-Weiss	3	1	0	0	2	36	51	−15	3		—	11–17	—	—

Source: European Aquatics Women's Conference Cup
(H) Host
Notes:

27 February 2026; 18:00	Report	VK Vojvodina (Serbia)	15–16	(Germany) SV Blau-Weiss	Slana Bara Sports Center, Novi Sad; Referees: Luis Alves (POR), Cihan Buyukburc (TUR)
27 February 2026; 18:00	Report	Score by quarters: 2–3, 4–6, 6–3, 3–4			Slana Bara Sports Center, Novi Sad; Referees: Luis Alves (POR), Cihan Buyukburc (TUR)
27 February 2026; 18:00	Report	Damnjanović 3	Goals	Johnson 6	Slana Bara Sports Center, Novi Sad; Referees: Luis Alves (POR), Cihan Buyukburc (TUR)

27 February 2026; 20:00	Report	NC Chania (Greece)	13–16	(Spain) Tenerife Echeyde	Slana Bara Sports Center, Novi Sad; Referees: Federica Rizzo (ITA), Alexandru Mustata (ROU)
27 February 2026; 20:00	Report	Score by quarters: 3–3, 3–4, 4–5, 3–4			Slana Bara Sports Center, Novi Sad; Referees: Federica Rizzo (ITA), Alexandru Mustata (ROU)
27 February 2026; 20:00	Report	Kotsia 8	Goals	Naya 4	Slana Bara Sports Center, Novi Sad; Referees: Federica Rizzo (ITA), Alexandru Mustata (ROU)

28 February 2026; 18:00	Report	VK Vojvodina (Serbia)	14–12	(Greece) NC Chania	Slana Bara Sports Center, Novi Sad; Referees: Federica Rizzo (ITA), Cihan Buyukburc (TUR)
28 February 2026; 18:00	Report	Score by quarters: 3–2, 4–4, 3–4, 4–2			Slana Bara Sports Center, Novi Sad; Referees: Federica Rizzo (ITA), Cihan Buyukburc (TUR)
28 February 2026; 18:00	Report	Švec 5	Goals	Stratidaki 4	Slana Bara Sports Center, Novi Sad; Referees: Federica Rizzo (ITA), Cihan Buyukburc (TUR)

28 February 2026; 20:00	Report	Tenerife Echeyde (Spain)	19–9	(Germany) SV Blau-Weiss	Slana Bara Sports Center, Novi Sad; Referees: Luis Alves (POR), Alexandru Mustata (ROU)
28 February 2026; 20:00	Report	Score by quarters: 3–2, 5–2, 7–3, 4–2			Slana Bara Sports Center, Novi Sad; Referees: Luis Alves (POR), Alexandru Mustata (ROU)
28 February 2026; 20:00	Report	De Klerr 4	Goals	four players 2	Slana Bara Sports Center, Novi Sad; Referees: Luis Alves (POR), Alexandru Mustata (ROU)

1 March 2026; 18:00	Report	VK Vojvodina (Serbia)	10–15	(Spain) Tenerife Echeyde	Slana Bara Sports Center, Novi Sad; Referees: Federica Rizzo (ITA), Luis Alves (POR)
1 March 2026; 18:00	Report	Score by quarters: 2–4, 2–4, 4–3, 2–4			Slana Bara Sports Center, Novi Sad; Referees: Federica Rizzo (ITA), Luis Alves (POR)
1 March 2026; 18:00	Report	four players 2	Goals	three players 3	Slana Bara Sports Center, Novi Sad; Referees: Federica Rizzo (ITA), Luis Alves (POR)

1 March 2026; 20:00	Report	SV Blau-Weiss (Germany)	11–17	(Greece) NC Chania	Slana Bara Sports Center, Novi Sad; Referees: Cihan Buyukburc (TUR), Alexandru Mustata (ROU)
1 March 2026; 20:00	Report	Score by quarters: 2–4, 2–5, 4–3, 3–5			Slana Bara Sports Center, Novi Sad; Referees: Cihan Buyukburc (TUR), Alexandru Mustata (ROU)
1 March 2026; 20:00	Report	Khmil 6	Goals	Paterou 4	Slana Bara Sports Center, Novi Sad; Referees: Cihan Buyukburc (TUR), Alexandru Mustata (ROU)

=== Group D ===
27 February – 1 March 2026, Istanbul, Turkey.

Pos	Team	Pld	W	PSW	PSL	L	GF	GA	GD	Pts	Qualification	GAL	MLA	BRI
1	(Turkey) Galatasaray Zena (H)	2	2	0	0	0	23	18	+5	6	Advance to Final Eight	—	13–11	10–7
2	(Croatia) ŽAVK Mladost	2	0	1	0	1	27	27	0	2	Advance to Final Eight	—	—	16–14 (Note: Match ended 12–12. ŽAVK Mladost won 4–2 on penalties.)
3	(Italy) Brizz Nuoto	2	0	0	1	1	21	26	−5	1		—	—	—

Source: European Aquatics Women's Conference Cup
(H) Host

27 February 2026; 21:00	Report	ŽAVK Mladost (Croatia)	16–14 (PSO)	(Italy) Brizz Nuoto	Galatasaray Kalamış Facilities, Istanbul; Referees: Luis Munoz Perez (ESP), Paula Riehn (GER)
27 February 2026; 21:00	Report	Score by quarters: 3–2, 2–2, 3–5, 4–3 PSO: 4–2			Galatasaray Kalamış Facilities, Istanbul; Referees: Luis Munoz Perez (ESP), Paula Riehn (GER)
27 February 2026; 21:00	Report	Glas 7	Goals	Sapienza, Spampinato 3	Galatasaray Kalamış Facilities, Istanbul; Referees: Luis Munoz Perez (ESP), Paula Riehn (GER)

28 February 2026; 17:00	Report	Galatasaray Zena (Turkey)	13–11	(Croatia) ŽAVK Mladost	Galatasaray Kalamış Facilities, Istanbul; Referees: Luis Munoz Perez (ESP), Neville Mercieca (MLT)
28 February 2026; 17:00	Report	Score by quarters: 3–4, 2–3, 5–1, 3–3			Galatasaray Kalamış Facilities, Istanbul; Referees: Luis Munoz Perez (ESP), Neville Mercieca (MLT)
28 February 2026; 17:00	Report	Ivanova 6	Goals	Glas 5	Galatasaray Kalamış Facilities, Istanbul; Referees: Luis Munoz Perez (ESP), Neville Mercieca (MLT)

1 March 2026; 13:00	Report	Galatasaray Zena (Turkey)	10–7	(Italy) Brizz Nuoto	Galatasaray Kalamış Facilities, Istanbul; Referees: Paula Riehn (GER), Neville Mercieca (MLT)
1 March 2026; 13:00	Report	Score by quarters: 3–3, 1–1, 3–2, 3–1			Galatasaray Kalamış Facilities, Istanbul; Referees: Paula Riehn (GER), Neville Mercieca (MLT)
1 March 2026; 13:00	Report	Ermakova 4	Goals	Bianchi, Van de Velde 2	Galatasaray Kalamış Facilities, Istanbul; Referees: Paula Riehn (GER), Neville Mercieca (MLT)

== See also ==
- 2025–26 European Aquatics Champions League
- 2025–26 European Aquatics Euro Cup
- 2025–26 European Aquatics Conference Cup
- 2025–26 European Aquatics Challenger Cup
- 2025 European Aquatics Super Cup
- 2025–26 European Aquatics Women's Champions League
- 2025–26 European Aquatics Women's Euro Cup
- 2025–26 European Aquatics Women's Conference Cup
- 2025–26 European Aquatics Women's Challenger Cup
- 2025 European Aquatics Women's Super Cup

Reference
Matchday 1
Matchday 2
Matchday 3
