= 2025–26 European Aquatics Women's Euro Cup knockout stage =

Tournament information
- Sport: Water polo
- Date: 14 March – 3 June 2026
- Teams: 8
- Website: Official website

Tournament statistics
- Matches played: 14

The 2025–26 European Aquatics Women's Euro Cup knockout stage details the matches played to decide the champion of the tournament. Games took place between the 14 March and 3 June 2026.

== Teams ==
The group winners and runners-up qualified for the quarterfinals.

Group	Winners	Runners-up
A	(Greece) Ethnikos OFPF	(Netherlands) Polar Bears
B	(Hungary) BVSC Manna ABC	(Greece) ANC Glyfada iRepair
C	(Spain) Zodiac CNAB	(Italy) Antenore Plebiscito Padova
D	(Spain) EPlus CN Catalunya	(Italy) Pallanuoto Trieste

== Draw ==
External videos
- 2025–26 European Aquatics Women's Euro Cup knockout stage – Draw
- Draw

The draw took place on 2 March in Zagreb. The seeding was decided by the club's rankings from the previous round. Teams who have already played in the previous round are not allowed to be drawn against each other.

Pot 1	Pot 2
(Greece) Ethnikos OFPF (Hungary) BVSC Manna ABC (Spain) Zodiac CNAB (Spain) EPlus CN Catalunya	(Netherlands) Polar Bears (Greece) ANC Glyfada iRepair (Italy) Antenore Plebiscito Padova (Italy) Pallanuoto Trieste

== Bracket ==
In the knockout phase, teams played against each other over two legs on a home-and-away basis.

Quarterfinals
(Greece) ANC Glyfada iRepair	8	11	19
(Spain) EPlus CN Catalunya	8	12	20
(Italy) Antenore Plebiscito Padova	9	8	17
(Hungary) BVSC Manna ABC	11	13	24
(Spain) Zodiac CNAB	10	13	23
(Netherlands) Polar Bears	9	12	21
(Greece) Ethnikos OFPF	8	8	16
(Italy) Pallanuoto Trieste	9	10	19

Semifinals
(Spain) EPlus CN Catalunya	13	11	24
(Hungary) BVSC Manna ABC	13	4	17
(Spain) Zodiac CNAB	12	14	26
(Italy) Pallanuoto Trieste	12	13	25

Final
(Spain) EPlus CN Catalunya	14	13	27
(Spain) Zodiac CNAB	9	11	20

== Quarterfinals ==
The first legs were played on 14 March, and the second legs were played on 28 March.

Team 1	Agg.	Team 2	1st leg	2nd leg
ANC Glyfada iRepair (Greece)	19–20	(Spain) EPlus CN Catalunya	8–8	11–12
Antenore Plebiscito Padova (Italy)	17–24	(Hungary) BVSC Manna ABC	9–11	8–13
Zodiac CNAB (Spain)	23–21	(Netherlands) Polar Bears	10–9	13–12
Ethnikos OFPF (Greece)	16–19	(Italy) Pallanuoto Trieste	8–9	8–10

=== Matches ===
14 March 2026; 17:30	Report	ANC Glyfada iRepair (Greece)	8–8	(Greece) EPlus CN Catalunya	"Ant. Dimitropoulos" Swimming Pool, Glyfada; Referees: Martina Kunikova (SVK), Lea Saftic (CRO)
14 March 2026; 17:30	Report	Score by quarters: 2–1, 1–2, 4–4, 1–1			"Ant. Dimitropoulos" Swimming Pool, Glyfada; Referees: Martina Kunikova (SVK), Lea Saftic (CRO)
14 March 2026; 17:30	Report	Ochoa 4	Goals	Falvey, Vosseberg 2	"Ant. Dimitropoulos" Swimming Pool, Glyfada; Referees: Martina Kunikova (SVK), Lea Saftic (CRO)

28 March 2026; 16:00	Report	EPlus CN Catalunya (Spain)	12–11	(Greece) ANC Glyfada iRepair	Sant Jordi Swimming Pool, Barcelona; Referees: Vuk Milovic (SRB), Mark Hendriks (NED)
28 March 2026; 16:00	Report	Score by quarters: 3–2, 3–5, 3–1, 3–3			Sant Jordi Swimming Pool, Barcelona; Referees: Vuk Milovic (SRB), Mark Hendriks (NED)
28 March 2026; 16:00	Report	Houghton 6	Goals	Kalaitzi, Moustakaria 3	Sant Jordi Swimming Pool, Barcelona; Referees: Vuk Milovic (SRB), Mark Hendriks (NED)

EPlus CN Catalunya won 20–19 on aggregate

14 March 2026; 18:00	Report	Antenore Plebiscito Padova (Italy)	9–11	(Hungary) BVSC Manna ABC	Centro Sportivo Plebiscito, Padua; Referees: Eurico Silva (POR), Marieke Van den Berg (NED)
14 March 2026; 18:00	Report	Score by quarters: 1–5, 1–2, 4–3, 3–1			Centro Sportivo Plebiscito, Padua; Referees: Eurico Silva (POR), Marieke Van den Berg (NED)
14 March 2026; 18:00	Report	Bovo, Millo 3	Goals	Gorter, Lendvay 3	Centro Sportivo Plebiscito, Padua; Referees: Eurico Silva (POR), Marieke Van den Berg (NED)

28 March 2026; 17:00	Report	BVSC Manna ABC (Hungary)	13–8	(Italy) Antenore Plebiscito Padova	Laky Károly Swimming Pool, Budapest; Referees: Ralf Mueller (GER), Peter Radic (SVK)
28 March 2026; 17:00	Report	Score by quarters: 4–2, 4–1, 2–2, 3–3			Laky Károly Swimming Pool, Budapest; Referees: Ralf Mueller (GER), Peter Radic (SVK)
28 March 2026; 17:00	Report	Lendvay 5	Goals	Bozzolan 2	Laky Károly Swimming Pool, Budapest; Referees: Ralf Mueller (GER), Peter Radic (SVK)

BVSC Manna ABC won 24–17 on aggregate

14 March 2026; 18:00	Report	Zodiac CNAB (Spain)	10–9	(Netherlands) Polar Bears	Piscina Sant Sebastià, Barcelona; Referees: Maxim Gerasimov (GBR), Gernot Haentschel (GER)
14 March 2026; 18:00	Report	Score by quarters: 2–2, 2–4, 1–3, 5–0			Piscina Sant Sebastià, Barcelona; Referees: Maxim Gerasimov (GBR), Gernot Haentschel (GER)
14 March 2026; 18:00	Report	Flynn, Nogué 2	Goals	Heerink 3	Piscina Sant Sebastià, Barcelona; Referees: Maxim Gerasimov (GBR), Gernot Haentschel (GER)

28 March 2026; 18:30	Report	Polar Bears (Netherlands)	12–13	(Spain) Zodiac CNAB	Zwembad De Peppel, Ede; Referees: Nora Debreceni (HUN), Luis Santos (POR)
28 March 2026; 18:30	Report	Score by quarters: 2–3, 3–2, 4–2, 3–6			Zwembad De Peppel, Ede; Referees: Nora Debreceni (HUN), Luis Santos (POR)
28 March 2026; 18:30	Report	Oort 4	Goals	Flynn, Aznar Díez 3	Zwembad De Peppel, Ede; Referees: Nora Debreceni (HUN), Luis Santos (POR)

Zodiac CNAB won 23–21 on aggregate

14 March 2026; 19:00	Report	Ethnikos OFPF (Greece)	8–9	(Italy) Pallanuoto Trieste	Papastrateio Swimming Pool, Piraeus; Referees: Nikolett Sajben (HUN), Bogdan Beljin (SRB)
14 March 2026; 19:00	Report	Score by quarters: 1–2, 1–2, 3–2, 3–3			Papastrateio Swimming Pool, Piraeus; Referees: Nikolett Sajben (HUN), Bogdan Beljin (SRB)
14 March 2026; 19:00	Report	Mamoglou 4	Goals	McDowall 5	Papastrateio Swimming Pool, Piraeus; Referees: Nikolett Sajben (HUN), Bogdan Beljin (SRB)

16 May 2026; 18:30	Report	Pallanuoto Trieste (Italy)	10–8	(Greece) Ethnikos OFPF	Bruno Bianchi Swimming Center, Trieste; Referees: Sara Kontek (CRO), Karel Dvoracek (CZE)
16 May 2026; 18:30	Report	Score by quarters: 1–3, 4–1, 2–2, 3–2			Bruno Bianchi Swimming Center, Trieste; Referees: Sara Kontek (CRO), Karel Dvoracek (CZE)
16 May 2026; 18:30	Report	Klatowski 3	Goals	Kontogianni 3	Bruno Bianchi Swimming Center, Trieste; Referees: Sara Kontek (CRO), Karel Dvoracek (CZE)

Pallanuoto Trieste won 19–16 on aggregate

== Semifinals ==
The first legs were played on 11 April, and the second legs were played on 16 May.

Team 1	Agg.	Team 2	1st leg	2nd leg
EPlus CN Catalunya (Spain)	24–17	(Hungary) BVSC Manna ABC	13–13	11–4
Zodiac CNAB (Spain)	26–25	(Italy) Pallanuoto Trieste	12–12	14–13

=== Matches ===
11 April 2026; 16:00	Report	EPlus CN Catalunya (Spain)	13–13	(Hungary) BVSC Manna ABC	Sant Jordi Swimming Pool, Barcelona; Referees: Natalia Markopoulou (GRE), Aurely Bouchez (FRA)
11 April 2026; 16:00	Report	Score by quarters: 3–1, 3–3, 3–5, 4–4			Sant Jordi Swimming Pool, Barcelona; Referees: Natalia Markopoulou (GRE), Aurely Bouchez (FRA)
11 April 2026; 16:00	Report	Houghton 5	Goals	Lendvay 4	Sant Jordi Swimming Pool, Barcelona; Referees: Natalia Markopoulou (GRE), Aurely Bouchez (FRA)

16 May 2026; 18:00	Report	BVSC Manna ABC (Hungary)	4–11	(Spain) EPlus CN Catalunya	Laky Károly Swimming Pool, Budapest; Referees: Lea Saftic (CRO), Hendrik Schopp (GER)
16 May 2026; 18:00	Report	Score by quarters: 1–3, 1–3, 0–1, 2–4			Laky Károly Swimming Pool, Budapest; Referees: Lea Saftic (CRO), Hendrik Schopp (GER)
16 May 2026; 18:00	Report	Lendvay 2	Goals	Houghton 3	Laky Károly Swimming Pool, Budapest; Referees: Lea Saftic (CRO), Hendrik Schopp (GER)

EPlus CN Catalunya won 24–17 on aggregate

11 April 2026; 13:00	Report	Zodiac CNAB (Spain)	12–12	(Italy) Pallanuoto Trieste	Piscina Sant Sebastià, Barcelona; Referees: Ivanka Krstonosic Rakovic (SRB), Sander Granjeans (NED)
11 April 2026; 13:00	Report	Score by quarters: 1–2, 3–1, 4–6, 4–3			Piscina Sant Sebastià, Barcelona; Referees: Ivanka Krstonosic Rakovic (SRB), Sander Granjeans (NED)
11 April 2026; 13:00	Report	Díaz Velázquez 4	Goals	McDowall 5	Piscina Sant Sebastià, Barcelona; Referees: Ivanka Krstonosic Rakovic (SRB), Sander Granjeans (NED)

16 May 2026; 18:00	Report	Pallanuoto Trieste (Italy)	13–14	(Spain) Zodiac CNAB	Bruno Bianchi Swimming Center, Trieste; Referees: Maria Daskalopoulou (GRE), Maxim Gerasimov (GBR)
16 May 2026; 18:00	Report	Score by quarters: 4–4, 2–3, 2–3, 5–4			Bruno Bianchi Swimming Center, Trieste; Referees: Maria Daskalopoulou (GRE), Maxim Gerasimov (GBR)
16 May 2026; 18:00	Report	Allen 5	Goals	Diaz, Aznar 4	Bruno Bianchi Swimming Center, Trieste; Referees: Maria Daskalopoulou (GRE), Maxim Gerasimov (GBR)

Zodiac CNAB won 26–25 on aggregate

== Final ==
The first leg was played on 27 May, and the second leg was played on 3 June.

Team 1	Agg.	Team 2	1st leg	2nd leg
EPlus CN Catalunya (Spain)	27–20	(Spain) Zodiac CNAB	14–9	13–11

27 May 2026; 20:30	Report	EPlus CN Catalunya (Spain)	14–9	(Spain) Zodiac CNAB	Sant Jordi Swimming Pool, Barcelona; Referees: Roberta Grillo (ITA), Ruben Garcia (SUI)
27 May 2026; 20:30	Report	Score by quarters: 3–3, 6–3, 3–1, 2–2			Sant Jordi Swimming Pool, Barcelona; Referees: Roberta Grillo (ITA), Ruben Garcia (SUI)
27 May 2026; 20:30	Report	Gomez de la Puente 4	Goals	Flynn 3	Sant Jordi Swimming Pool, Barcelona; Referees: Roberta Grillo (ITA), Ruben Garcia (SUI)

3 June 2026; 19:30	Report	Zodiac CNAB (Spain)	11–13	(Spain) EPlus CN Catalunya	Piscina Sant Sebastià, Barcelona; Referees: Natalia Markopoulou (GRE), Nora Debreceni (HUN)
3 June 2026; 19:30	Report	Score by quarters: 2–5, 2–4, 3–3, 4–1			Piscina Sant Sebastià, Barcelona; Referees: Natalia Markopoulou (GRE), Nora Debreceni (HUN)
3 June 2026; 19:30	Report	Díaz, Aznar 3	Goals	Falvey 3	Piscina Sant Sebastià, Barcelona; Referees: Natalia Markopoulou (GRE), Nora Debreceni (HUN)

EPlus CN Catalunya won 27–20 on aggregate

== See also ==
- 2025–26 European Aquatics Champions League
- 2025–26 European Aquatics Euro Cup
- 2025–26 European Aquatics Conference Cup
- 2025–26 European Aquatics Challenger Cup
- 2025 European Aquatics Super Cup
- 2025–26 European Aquatics Women's Champions League
- 2025–26 European Aquatics Women's Euro Cup
- 2025–26 European Aquatics Women's Conference Cup
- 2025–26 European Aquatics Women's Challenger Cup
- 2025 European Aquatics Women's Super Cup

Reference
Quarter-finals - First leg
Quarter-finals - Second leg
Semi-finals - First leg
Semi-finals - Second leg
Final - First leg
Final - Second leg

Reference
Quarter-finals - First leg
Quarter-finals - Second leg
Semi-finals - First leg
Semi-finals - Second leg
Final - First leg
Final - Second leg
