= 2025–26 European Aquatics Women's Conference Cup qualification round I =

- 2025–26

Tournament information
- Sport: Water polo
- Date: 14–16 November 2025
- Host(s): (Malta) Cottonera (Romania) Alba Iulia (Italy) Catania
- Teams: 16 (from 12 countries)
- Website: Official website

Tournament statistics
- Matches played: 24

The 2025–26 European Aquatics Women's Conference Cup qualification round I is played between 14 and 16 November 2025 to determine the 8 teams advancing to the qualification round II of the 2025–26 European Aquatics Women's Conference Cup.

== Format ==
The 16 teams were place into four groups of four teams. In each group, teams will play against each other once in a round-robin format. The top two in each group advance to the next round.

Teams are ranked according to points (3 points for a win, 2 points for a penalty shootout win, 1 point for a penalty shootout loss, 0 points for a loss), and if tied on points, the following tiebreaking criteria are applied, in the order given, to determine the rankings:

- Points in head-to-head matches among tied teams;
- Goal difference in head-to-head matches among tied teams;
- Goals scored in head-to-head matches among tied teams;
- Goal difference in all group matches;
- Goals scored in all group matches.

== Draw ==
External videos
- 2025–26 European Aquatics Women's Conference Cup qualification round I – Draw
- Draw

The draw was on 11 August 2025 in Zagreb, Croatia. (H) indicates which clubs is hosting a group. The seeding is based on the club rankings.

Key to colours
Teams advancing to qualification round II

Pot 1
Team	Rank	Points
(Spain) Tenerife Echeyde	27	6,075
(Turkey) Goztepe SK	28	5,750
(Malta) Sirens ASC (H)	33	4,640
(Croatia) Jadran Split	35	3,770

Pot 2
Team	Rank	Points
(Netherlands) ZVL 1886	40	2,865
(Serbia) ZVK Crvena Zvezda	43	2,490
(Germany) SV Blau-Weiss	44	2,460
(Turkey) Dalton Koleji SK	50	1,610

Pot 3
Team	Rank	Points
(Romania) CSM Unirea Alba Iulia (H)	51	16,10
(Portugal) Clube Fluvial	53	1,180
(Spain) CN Sant Feliu	N/A	
(Greece) AC PAOK	N/A	

Pot 4
Team	Rank	Points
(Greece) NC Chania	N/A	
(Italy) Cosenza Pallanuoto	N/A	
(Italy) Brizz Nuoto (H)	N/A	
(Malta) San Giljan ASC (H)	N/A	

== Groups ==
=== Group A ===
14–16 November 2025, Cottonera, Malta.

Pos	Team	Pld	W	PSW	PSL	L	GF	GA	GD	Pts	Qualification	FEL	BLA	GOZ	GIL
1	(Spain) CN Sant Feliu	3	3	0	0	0	66	19	+47	9	Qualification round II	—	—	—	—
2	(Germany) SV Blau-Weiss	3	2	0	0	1	41	34	+7	6	Qualification round II	8–15	—	15–12	—
3	(Turkey) Goztepe SK	3	1	0	0	2	38	39	−1	3		8–20	—	—	—
4	(Malta) San Giljan ASC (H)	3	0	0	0	3	14	67	−53	0		3–31	7–18	4–18	—

Source: European Aquatics Women's Conference Cup
(H) Host

14 November 2025; 13:00	Report	Goztepe SK (Turkey)	8–20	(Spain) CN Sant Feliu	Cottonera Sports Complex, Cottonera; Referees: Luis Santos (POR), Adamantia Aikaterini Saravelaki (GRE)
14 November 2025; 13:00	Report	Score by quarters: 1–2, 4–5, 0–8, 3–5			Cottonera Sports Complex, Cottonera; Referees: Luis Santos (POR), Adamantia Aikaterini Saravelaki (GRE)
14 November 2025; 13:00	Report	Chydirioti 3	Goals	Moreno Perez, Panicello Sanz 4	Cottonera Sports Complex, Cottonera; Referees: Luis Santos (POR), Adamantia Aikaterini Saravelaki (GRE)

14 November 2025; 14:30	Report	San Giljan ASC (Malta)	7–18	(Germany) SV Blau-Weiss	Cottonera Sports Complex, Cottonera; Referees: Stasa Ilic (SRB), Koppany Toth (HUN)
14 November 2025; 14:30	Report	Score by quarters: 1–3, 1–6, 3–4, 2–5			Cottonera Sports Complex, Cottonera; Referees: Stasa Ilic (SRB), Koppany Toth (HUN)
14 November 2025; 14:30	Report	Borg 5	Goals	Fry 5	Cottonera Sports Complex, Cottonera; Referees: Stasa Ilic (SRB), Koppany Toth (HUN)

15 November 2025; 13:00	Report	SV Blau-Weiss (Germany)	8–15	(Spain) CN Sant Feliu	Cottonera Sports Complex, Cottonera; Referees: Luis Santos (POR), Koppany Toth (HUN)
15 November 2025; 13:00	Report	Score by quarters: 2–3, 3–3, 1–5, 2–4			Cottonera Sports Complex, Cottonera; Referees: Luis Santos (POR), Koppany Toth (HUN)
15 November 2025; 13:00	Report	Khmil, Stuwe 2	Goals	Moreno Perez, Moore 3	Cottonera Sports Complex, Cottonera; Referees: Luis Santos (POR), Koppany Toth (HUN)

15 November 2025; 14:30	Report	San Giljan ASC (Malta)	4–18	(Turkey) Goztepe SK	Cottonera Sports Complex, Cottonera; Referees: Adamantia Aikaterini Saravelaki (GRE), Stasa Ilic (SRB)
15 November 2025; 14:30	Report	Score by quarters: 2–7, 1–3, 0–4, 1–4			Cottonera Sports Complex, Cottonera; Referees: Adamantia Aikaterini Saravelaki (GRE), Stasa Ilic (SRB)
15 November 2025; 14:30	Report	Borg 3	Goals	Chydirioti, Dabbag 6	Cottonera Sports Complex, Cottonera; Referees: Adamantia Aikaterini Saravelaki (GRE), Stasa Ilic (SRB)

16 November 2025; 10:00	Report	San Giljan ASC (Malta)	3–31	(Spain) CN Sant Feliu	Cottonera Sports Complex, Cottonera; Referees: Luis Santos (POR), Stasa Ilic (SRB)
16 November 2025; 10:00	Report	Score by quarters: 0–8, 1–6, 1–9, 1–8			Cottonera Sports Complex, Cottonera; Referees: Luis Santos (POR), Stasa Ilic (SRB)
16 November 2025; 10:00	Report	Tully 2	Goals	Moreno Perez 5	Cottonera Sports Complex, Cottonera; Referees: Luis Santos (POR), Stasa Ilic (SRB)

16 November 2025; 11:30	Report	SV Blau-Weiss (Germany)	15–12	(Turkey) Goztepe SK	Cottonera Sports Complex, Cottonera; Referees: Koppany Toth (HUN), Adamantia Aikaterini Saravelaki (GRE)
16 November 2025; 11:30	Report	Score by quarters: 6–5, 2–4, 5–3, 2–0			Cottonera Sports Complex, Cottonera; Referees: Koppany Toth (HUN), Adamantia Aikaterini Saravelaki (GRE)
16 November 2025; 11:30	Report	Khmil 5	Goals	Mimides 4	Cottonera Sports Complex, Cottonera; Referees: Koppany Toth (HUN), Adamantia Aikaterini Saravelaki (GRE)

=== Group B ===
14–16 November 2025, Alba Iulia, Romania.

Pos	Team	Pld	W	PSW	PSL	L	GF	GA	GD	Pts	Qualification	COS	UNI	JAD	CRV
1	(Italy) Smile Cosenza Pallanuoto	3	3	0	0	0	50	9	+41	9	Qualification round II	—	—	21–3	16–3
2	(Romania) CSM Unirea Alba Iulia (H)	3	2	0	0	1	34	28	+6	6	Qualification round II	3–13	—	11–10	20–5
3	(Croatia) Jadran Split	3	1	0	0	2	29	35	−6	3		—	—	—	16–3
4	(Serbia) ZVK Crvena Zvezda	3	0	0	0	3	11	52	−41	0		—	—	—	—

Source: European Aquatics Women's Conference Cup
(H) Host

14 November 2025; 17:00	Report	Jadran Split (Croatia)	16–3	(Serbia) ZVK Crvena Zvezda	Olympic Pool, Alba Iulia; Referees: Rosa Fernandez Fabregas (ESP), Canberk Durak (TUR)
14 November 2025; 17:00	Report	Score by quarters: 5–1, 3–0, 4–0, 4–2			Olympic Pool, Alba Iulia; Referees: Rosa Fernandez Fabregas (ESP), Canberk Durak (TUR)
14 November 2025; 17:00	Report	Jankovic 4	Goals	three players 1	Olympic Pool, Alba Iulia; Referees: Rosa Fernandez Fabregas (ESP), Canberk Durak (TUR)

14 November 2025; 19:00	Report	CSM Unirea Alba Iulia (Romania)	3–13	(Italy) Smile Cosenza Pallanuoto	Olympic Pool, Alba Iulia; Referees: Massimo Angileri (MLT), Karel Dvoracek (CZE)
14 November 2025; 19:00	Report	Score by quarters: 1–3, 0–3, 0–4, 2–3			Olympic Pool, Alba Iulia; Referees: Massimo Angileri (MLT), Karel Dvoracek (CZE)
14 November 2025; 19:00	Report	Laboncz 2	Goals	Rozic 4	Olympic Pool, Alba Iulia; Referees: Massimo Angileri (MLT), Karel Dvoracek (CZE)

15 November 2025; 17:00	Report	CSM Unirea Alba Iulia (Romania)	20–5	(Serbia) ZVK Crvena Zvezda	Olympic Pool, Alba Iulia; Referees: Massimo Angileri (MLT), Canberk Durak (TUR)
15 November 2025; 17:00	Report	Score by quarters: 4–2, 5–0, 9–1, 2–2			Olympic Pool, Alba Iulia; Referees: Massimo Angileri (MLT), Canberk Durak (TUR)
15 November 2025; 17:00	Report	Diaz Mesa 9	Goals	Jankovic 3	Olympic Pool, Alba Iulia; Referees: Massimo Angileri (MLT), Canberk Durak (TUR)

15 November 2025; 19:00	Report	Smile Cosenza Pallanuoto (Italy)	21–3	(Croatia) Jadran Split	Olympic Pool, Alba Iulia; Referees: Rosa Fernandez Fabregas (ESP), Karel Dvoracek (CZE)
15 November 2025; 19:00	Report	Score by quarters: 4–1, 7–1, 6–1, '4–0			Olympic Pool, Alba Iulia; Referees: Rosa Fernandez Fabregas (ESP), Karel Dvoracek (CZE)
15 November 2025; 19:00	Report	three players 4	Goals	Butic 2	Olympic Pool, Alba Iulia; Referees: Rosa Fernandez Fabregas (ESP), Karel Dvoracek (CZE)

16 November 2025; 10:00	Report	Smile Cosenza Pallanuoto (Italy)	16–3	(Serbia) ZVK Crvena Zvezda	Olympic Pool, Alba Iulia; Referees: Rosa Fernandez Fabregas (ESP), Massimo Angileri (MLT)
16 November 2025; 10:00	Report	Score by quarters: 1–0, 7–2, 4–0, 4–1			Olympic Pool, Alba Iulia; Referees: Rosa Fernandez Fabregas (ESP), Massimo Angileri (MLT)
16 November 2025; 10:00	Report	Citino, Rozic 4	Goals	Trbanos 2	Olympic Pool, Alba Iulia; Referees: Rosa Fernandez Fabregas (ESP), Massimo Angileri (MLT)

16 November 2025; 12:00	Report	CSM Unirea Alba Iulia (Romania)	11–10	(Croatia) Jadran Split	Olympic Pool, Alba Iulia; Referees: Karel Dvoracek (CZE), Canberk Durak (TUR)
16 November 2025; 12:00	Report	Score by quarters: 3–2, 0–3, 3–2, 5–3			Olympic Pool, Alba Iulia; Referees: Karel Dvoracek (CZE), Canberk Durak (TUR)
16 November 2025; 12:00	Report	Lopez Perez 5	Goals	Jankovic 4	Olympic Pool, Alba Iulia; Referees: Karel Dvoracek (CZE), Canberk Durak (TUR)

=== Group C ===
14–16 November 2025, Catania, Italy.

Pos	Team	Pld	W	PSW	PSL	L	GF	GA	GD	Pts	Qualification	TEN	BRI	FLU	DAL
1	(Spain) Tenerife Echeyde	3	3	0	0	0	47	15	+32	9	Qualification round II	—	11–7	—	17–3
2	(Italy) Brizz Nuoto (H)	3	2	0	0	1	52	23	+29	6	Qualification round II	—	—	—	—
3	(Portugal) Clube Fluvial	3	1	0	0	2	29	54	−25	3		5–19	6–20	—	18–15
4	(Turkey) Dalton Koleji SK	3	0	0	0	3	24	60	−36	0		—	6–25	—	—

Source: European Aquatics Women's Conference Cup
(H) Host

14 November 2025; 19:00	Report	Clube Fluvial (Portugal)	5–19	(Spain) Tenerife Echeyde	"Francesco Scuderi" Swimming Pool, Catania; Referees: Maria Daskalopoulou (GRE), Gernot Haentschel (GER)
14 November 2025; 19:00	Report	Score by quarters: 3–2, 1–7, 1–8, 0–2			"Francesco Scuderi" Swimming Pool, Catania; Referees: Maria Daskalopoulou (GRE), Gernot Haentschel (GER)
14 November 2025; 19:00	Report	Fernandes Pereira 2	Goals	Dempsey 6	"Francesco Scuderi" Swimming Pool, Catania; Referees: Maria Daskalopoulou (GRE), Gernot Haentschel (GER)

14 November 2025; 20:30	Report	Dalton Koleji SK (Turkey)	6–25	(Italy) Brizz Nuoto	"Francesco Scuderi" Swimming Pool, Catania; Referees: Alexandru Mustata (ROU), Johan de Boer (NED)
14 November 2025; 20:30	Report	Score by quarters: 1–7, 4–4, 0–7, 1–7			"Francesco Scuderi" Swimming Pool, Catania; Referees: Alexandru Mustata (ROU), Johan de Boer (NED)
14 November 2025; 20:30	Report	Keremoglu 3	Goals	Bianchi, Maatafa 4	"Francesco Scuderi" Swimming Pool, Catania; Referees: Alexandru Mustata (ROU), Johan de Boer (NED)

15 November 2025; 18:00	Report	Clube Fluvial (Portugal)	18–15	(Turkey) Dalton Koleji SK	"Francesco Scuderi" Swimming Pool, Catania; Referees: Gernot Haentschel (GER), Johan de Boer (NED)
15 November 2025; 18:00	Report	Score by quarters: 5–4, 3–3, 4–6, 6–2			"Francesco Scuderi" Swimming Pool, Catania; Referees: Gernot Haentschel (GER), Johan de Boer (NED)
15 November 2025; 18:00	Report	Joana Teixeira 8	Goals	Altiparmak 7	"Francesco Scuderi" Swimming Pool, Catania; Referees: Gernot Haentschel (GER), Johan de Boer (NED)

15 November 2025; 19:30	Report	Tenerife Echeyde (Spain)	11–7	(Italy) Brizz Nuoto	"Francesco Scuderi" Swimming Pool, Catania; Referees: Maria Daskalopoulou (GRE), Alexandru Mustata (ROU)
15 November 2025; 19:30	Report	Score by quarters: 3–2, 3–2, 2–2, 3–1			"Francesco Scuderi" Swimming Pool, Catania; Referees: Maria Daskalopoulou (GRE), Alexandru Mustata (ROU)
15 November 2025; 19:30	Report	Camarena Heredia 4	Goals	Lombardo 2	"Francesco Scuderi" Swimming Pool, Catania; Referees: Maria Daskalopoulou (GRE), Alexandru Mustata (ROU)

16 November 2025; 09:00	Report	Tenerife Echeyde (Spain)	17–3	(Turkey) Dalton Koleji SK	"Francesco Scuderi" Swimming Pool, Catania; Referees: Maria Daskalopoulou (GRE), Johan de Boer (NED)
16 November 2025; 09:00	Report	Score by quarters: 4–1, 3–0, 6–2, 4–0			"Francesco Scuderi" Swimming Pool, Catania; Referees: Maria Daskalopoulou (GRE), Johan de Boer (NED)
16 November 2025; 09:00	Report	three players 3	Goals	Altiparmak 2	"Francesco Scuderi" Swimming Pool, Catania; Referees: Maria Daskalopoulou (GRE), Johan de Boer (NED)

16 November 2025; 10:30	Report	Clube Fluvial (Portugal)	6–20	(Italy) Brizz Nuoto	"Francesco Scuderi" Swimming Pool, Catania; Referees: Gernot Haentschel (GER), Alexandru Mustata (ROU)
16 November 2025; 10:30	Report	Score by quarters: 2–4, 2–7, 0–5, 2–4			"Francesco Scuderi" Swimming Pool, Catania; Referees: Gernot Haentschel (GER), Alexandru Mustata (ROU)
16 November 2025; 10:30	Report	Magano Fernandes, Ribeiro 2	Goals	Bianchi 5	"Francesco Scuderi" Swimming Pool, Catania; Referees: Gernot Haentschel (GER), Alexandru Mustata (ROU)

=== Group D ===
14–16 November 2025, Cottonera, Malta.

Pos	Team	Pld	W	PSW	PSL	L	GF	GA	GD	Pts	Qualification	PAOK	CHA	ZVL	SIR
1	(Greece) AC PAOK	3	3	0	0	0	66	35	+31	9	Qualification round II	—	21–12	21–16	—
2	(Greece) NC Chania	3	1	1	0	1	35	37	−2	5	Qualification round II	—	—	11–9 (Note: Match ended 7–7, NC Chania 4–2 on penalties.)	—
3	(Netherlands) ZVL 1886	3	1	0	1	1	42	34	+8	4		—	—	—	—
4	(Malta) Sirens ASC (H)	3	0	0	0	3	16	53	−37	0		7–24	7–12	2–17	—

Source: European Aquatics Women's Conference Cup
(H) Host

14 November 2025; 18:00	Report	NC Chania (Greece)	11–9 (PSO)	(Netherlands) ZVL 1886	Cottonera Sports Complex, Cottonera; Referees: Robert Horvath (SVK), Lea Saftic (CRO)
14 November 2025; 18:00	Report	Score by quarters: 1–1, 1–2, 1–3, 4–1 PSO: 4–2			Cottonera Sports Complex, Cottonera; Referees: Robert Horvath (SVK), Lea Saftic (CRO)
14 November 2025; 18:00	Report	Kotsia 4	Goals	three players 2	Cottonera Sports Complex, Cottonera; Referees: Robert Horvath (SVK), Lea Saftic (CRO)

14 November 2025; 19:30	Report	Sirens ASC (Malta)	7–24	(Greece) AC PAOK	Cottonera Sports Complex, Cottonera; Referees: Ghislain Dehon (FRA), Roberta Grillo (ITA)
14 November 2025; 19:30	Report	Score by quarters: 1–7, 2–5, 4–7, 0–5			Cottonera Sports Complex, Cottonera; Referees: Ghislain Dehon (FRA), Roberta Grillo (ITA)
14 November 2025; 19:30	Report	three players 2	Goals	Ura 6	Cottonera Sports Complex, Cottonera; Referees: Ghislain Dehon (FRA), Roberta Grillo (ITA)

15 November 2025; 16:00	Report	Sirens ASC (Malta)	7–12	(Greece) NC Chania	Cottonera Sports Complex, Cottonera; Referees: Ghislain Dehon (FRA), Robert Horvath (SVK)
15 November 2025; 16:00	Report	Score by quarters: 0–3, 3–5, 1–3, 3–1			Cottonera Sports Complex, Cottonera; Referees: Ghislain Dehon (FRA), Robert Horvath (SVK)
15 November 2025; 16:00	Report	K. Agius 5	Goals	Ntasiou 5	Cottonera Sports Complex, Cottonera; Referees: Ghislain Dehon (FRA), Robert Horvath (SVK)

15 November 2025; 17:30	Report	AC PAOK (Greece)	21–16	(Netherlands) ZVL 1886	Cottonera Sports Complex, Cottonera; Referees: Roberta Grillo (ITA), Lea Saftic (CRO)
15 November 2025; 17:30	Report	Score by quarters: 8–2, 6–5, 4–7, 3–2			Cottonera Sports Complex, Cottonera; Referees: Roberta Grillo (ITA), Lea Saftic (CRO)
15 November 2025; 17:30	Report	Ura 6	Goals	Pauli 7	Cottonera Sports Complex, Cottonera; Referees: Roberta Grillo (ITA), Lea Saftic (CRO)

16 November 2025; 13:00	Report	Sirens ASC (Malta)	2–17	(Netherlands) ZVL 1886	Cottonera Sports Complex, Cottonera; Referees: Robert Horvath (SVK), Roberta Grillo (ITA)
16 November 2025; 13:00	Report	Score by quarters: 0–5, 1–4, 0–3, 1–5			Cottonera Sports Complex, Cottonera; Referees: Robert Horvath (SVK), Roberta Grillo (ITA)
16 November 2025; 13:00	Report	K. Agius, N. Agius 1	Goals	four players 3	Cottonera Sports Complex, Cottonera; Referees: Robert Horvath (SVK), Roberta Grillo (ITA)

16 November 2025; 14:30	Report	AC PAOK (Greece)	21–12	(Greece) NC Chania	Cottonera Sports Complex, Cottonera; Referees: Lea Saftic (CRO), Ghislain Dehon (FRA)
16 November 2025; 14:30	Report	Score by quarters: 6–3, 5–4, 4–2, 6–3			Cottonera Sports Complex, Cottonera; Referees: Lea Saftic (CRO), Ghislain Dehon (FRA)
16 November 2025; 14:30	Report	Karipidou 5	Goals	three players 3	Cottonera Sports Complex, Cottonera; Referees: Lea Saftic (CRO), Ghislain Dehon (FRA)

== See also ==
- 2025–26 European Aquatics Champions League
- 2025–26 European Aquatics Euro Cup
- 2025–26 European Aquatics Conference Cup
- 2025–26 European Aquatics Challenger Cup
- 2025 European Aquatics Super Cup
- 2025–26 European Aquatics Women's Champions League
- 2025–26 European Aquatics Women's Euro Cup
- 2025–26 European Aquatics Women's Conference Cup
- 2025–26 European Aquatics Women's Challenger Cup
- 2025 European Aquatics Women's Super Cup

Reference
Matchday 1
Matchday 2
Matchday 3
