= 2025–26 European Aquatics Women's Conference Cup Final Eight =

Tournament information
- Sport: Water polo
- Date: 26–29 March 2026
- Host: (Greece) Athens
- Teams: 8 (from 6 countries)
- Website: Official website

Final positions
- Champion: (Italy) Smile Cosenza Pallanuoto
- Runner-up: (Spain) CN Sant Feliu

Tournament statistics
- Matches played: 20

The 2025–26 European Aquatics Women's Conference Cup Final Eight is played between 26 and 29 March 2026 to determine the champions of the 2025–26 European Aquatics Women's Conference Cup.

== Format ==
The 8 teams were placed into two groups of four. In each group, teams will play against each other once in a round-robin format. The top two in each group advance to the semifinals.

Teams are ranked according to points (3 points for a win, 2 points for a penalty shootout win, 1 point for a penalty shootout loss, 0 points for a loss), and if tied on points, the following tiebreaking criteria are applied, in the order given, to determine the rankings:

- Points in head-to-head matches among tied teams;
- Goal difference in head-to-head matches among tied teams;
- Goals scored in head-to-head matches among tied teams;
- Goal difference in all group matches;
- Goals scored in all group matches.

== Draw ==
External videos
- 2025–26 European Aquatics Women's Conference Cup Final Eight – Draw
- Draw

The draw was on 2 March 2026 in Zagreb, Croatia. The draw started with, in order, pots 1 and 2 being drawn. The position for the team within the group would then be drawn (for the purpose of the schedule).

=== Seeding ===
The pots were decided by as follows:

- Pot 1 consisted of the group winners of the Conference Cup qualification round II
- Pot 2 consisted of the group runners-up of the Conference Cup qualification round II.

Pot 1
Team
(Spain) CN Sant Feliu
(Italy) Smile Cosenza Pallanuoto
(Spain) Tenerife Echeyde
(Turkey) Galatasaray Zena

Pot 2
Team
(Romania) CSM Unirea Alba Iulia
(Greece) Panionios GSS (H)
(Greece) NC Chania
(Croatia) ŽAVK Mladost

=== Draw results ===
Group A
Pos	Team
A1	(Turkey) Galatasaray Zena
A2	(Romania) CSM Unirea Alba Iulia
A3	(Greece) Panionios GSS (H)
A4	(Spain) Tenerife Echeyde

Group B
Pos	Team
B1	(Italy) Smile Cosenza Pallanuoto
B2	(Croatia) ŽAVK Mladost
B3	(Spain) CN Sant Feliu
B4	(Greece) NC Chania

== Groups ==
=== Group A ===
Pos	Team	Pld	W	PSW	PSL	L	GF	GA	GD	Pts	Qualification	PAN	TEN	GAL	UNI
1	(Greece) Panionios GSS (H)	3	3	0	0	0	43	19	+24	9	Semi-finals	—	—	—	—
2	(Turkey) Galatasaray Zena	3	2	0	0	1	50	37	+13	6	Semi-finals	6–13	—	—	15–10
3	(Spain) Tenerife Echeyde	3	1	0	0	2	33	40	−7	3	5–8 placement bracket	11–16	17–12	—	22–9
4	(Romania) CSM Unirea Alba Iulia	3	0	0	0	3	21	51	−30	0	5–8 placement bracket	2–14	—	—	—

Source: European Aquatics Women's Conference Cup
(H) Host

26 March 2026; 09:30	Report	Tenerife Echeyde (Spain)	17–12	(Turkey) Galatasaray Zena	Nea Smyrni Swimming Pool, Athens; Referees: Aurely Bouchez (FRA), Massimo Angileri (MLT)
26 March 2026; 09:30	Report	Score by quarters: 4–1, 2–2, 4–5, 7–4			Nea Smyrni Swimming Pool, Athens; Referees: Aurely Bouchez (FRA), Massimo Angileri (MLT)
26 March 2026; 09:30	Report	three players 3	Goals	Ermakova 6	Nea Smyrni Swimming Pool, Athens; Referees: Aurely Bouchez (FRA), Massimo Angileri (MLT)

26 March 2026; 11:15	Report	CSM Unirea Alba Iulia (Romania)	2–14	(Greece) Panionios GSS	Nea Smyrni Swimming Pool, Athens; Referees: Nikolett Sajben (HUN), Martina Kunikova (SVK)
26 March 2026; 11:15	Report	Score by quarters: 1–4, 0–2, 0–5, 1–4			Nea Smyrni Swimming Pool, Athens; Referees: Nikolett Sajben (HUN), Martina Kunikova (SVK)
26 March 2026; 11:15	Report	Díaz, Lopez Perez 1	Goals	three players 3	Nea Smyrni Swimming Pool, Athens; Referees: Nikolett Sajben (HUN), Martina Kunikova (SVK)

26 March 2026; 19:45	Report	Galatasaray Zena (Turkey)	6–13	(Greece) Panionios GSS	Nea Smyrni Swimming Pool, Athens; Referees: Ivanka Krstonosic Rakovic (SRB), Marieke Van den Berg (NED)
26 March 2026; 19:45	Report	Score by quarters: 1–3, 0–4, 3–4, 2–2			Nea Smyrni Swimming Pool, Athens; Referees: Ivanka Krstonosic Rakovic (SRB), Marieke Van den Berg (NED)
26 March 2026; 19:45	Report	Burali 3	Goals	Papanastasiou 6	Nea Smyrni Swimming Pool, Athens; Referees: Ivanka Krstonosic Rakovic (SRB), Marieke Van den Berg (NED)

26 March 2026; 21:30	Report	Tenerife Echeyde (Spain)	22–9	(Romania) CSM Unirea Alba Iulia	Nea Smyrni Swimming Pool, Athens; Referees: Nikolett Sajben (HUN), Paula Riehn (GER)
26 March 2026; 21:30	Report	Score by quarters: 6–1, 4–3, 7–3, 5–2			Nea Smyrni Swimming Pool, Athens; Referees: Nikolett Sajben (HUN), Paula Riehn (GER)
26 March 2026; 21:30	Report	Ramos Fernandez 4	Goals	Díaz 3	Nea Smyrni Swimming Pool, Athens; Referees: Nikolett Sajben (HUN), Paula Riehn (GER)

27 March 2026; 13:00	Report	Tenerife Echeyde (Spain)	11–16	(Greece) Panionios GSS	Nea Smyrni Swimming Pool, Athens; Referees: Aurely Bouchez (FRA), Ivanka Krstonosic Rakovic (SRB)
27 March 2026; 13:00	Report	Score by quarters: 3–3, 1–5, 3–5, 4–3			Nea Smyrni Swimming Pool, Athens; Referees: Aurely Bouchez (FRA), Ivanka Krstonosic Rakovic (SRB)
27 March 2026; 13:00	Report	De Klerr, Naya 2	Goals	three players 3	Nea Smyrni Swimming Pool, Athens; Referees: Aurely Bouchez (FRA), Ivanka Krstonosic Rakovic (SRB)

27 March 2026; 18:00	Report	Galatasaray Zena (Turkey)	15–10	(Romania) CSM Unirea Alba Iulia	Nea Smyrni Swimming Pool, Athens; Referees: Eurico Silva (POR), Massimo Angileri (MLT)
27 March 2026; 18:00	Report	Score by quarters: 5–2, 4–0, 3–5, 3–3			Nea Smyrni Swimming Pool, Athens; Referees: Eurico Silva (POR), Massimo Angileri (MLT)
27 March 2026; 18:00	Report	Burali, Ermakova 4	Goals	Laboncz, Lopez Perez 3	Nea Smyrni Swimming Pool, Athens; Referees: Eurico Silva (POR), Massimo Angileri (MLT)

=== Group B ===
Pos	Team	Pld	W	PSW	PSL	L	GF	GA	GD	Pts	Qualification	COS	FEL	CHA	MLA
1	(Italy) Smile Cosenza Pallanuoto	3	3	0	0	0	46	25	+21	9	Semi-finals	—	15–12	—	13–6
2	(Spain) CN Sant Feliu	3	2	0	0	1	47	34	+13	6	Semi-finals	—	—	19–15	16–4
3	(Greece) NC Chania	3	1	0	0	2	35	46	−11	3	5–8 placement bracket	7–18	—	—	—
4	(Croatia) ŽAVK Mladost	3	0	0	0	3	19	42	−23	0	5–8 placement bracket	—	—	9–13	—

Source: European Aquatics Women's Conference Cup

26 March 2026; 13:00	Report	Smile Cosenza Pallanuoto (Italy)	15–12	(Spain) CN Sant Feliu	Nea Smyrni Swimming Pool, Athens; Referees: Ivanka Krstonosic Rakovic (SRB), Eurico Silva (POR)
26 March 2026; 13:00	Report	Score by quarters: 6–2, 5–4, 1–4, 3–2			Nea Smyrni Swimming Pool, Athens; Referees: Ivanka Krstonosic Rakovic (SRB), Eurico Silva (POR)
26 March 2026; 13:00	Report	Rozic 8	Goals	Ungría 4	Nea Smyrni Swimming Pool, Athens; Referees: Ivanka Krstonosic Rakovic (SRB), Eurico Silva (POR)

26 March 2026; 18:00	Report	ŽAVK Mladost (Croatia)	9–13	(Greece) NC Chania	Nea Smyrni Swimming Pool, Athens; Referees: Eurico Silva (POR), Aurely Bouchez (FRA)
26 March 2026; 18:00	Report	Score by quarters: 2–4, 3–4, 1–2, 3–3			Nea Smyrni Swimming Pool, Athens; Referees: Eurico Silva (POR), Aurely Bouchez (FRA)
26 March 2026; 18:00	Report	Glas 4	Goals	Ntasiou, Stratidaki 4	Nea Smyrni Swimming Pool, Athens; Referees: Eurico Silva (POR), Aurely Bouchez (FRA)

27 March 2026; 09:30	Report	CN Sant Feliu (Spain)	16–4	(Croatia) ŽAVK Mladost	Nea Smyrni Swimming Pool, Athens; Referees: Massimo Angileri (MLT), Paula Riehn (GER)
27 March 2026; 09:30	Report	Score by quarters: 3–0, 5–3, 4–1, 4–0			Nea Smyrni Swimming Pool, Athens; Referees: Massimo Angileri (MLT), Paula Riehn (GER)
27 March 2026; 09:30	Report	Panicello 4	Goals	Glas 2	Nea Smyrni Swimming Pool, Athens; Referees: Massimo Angileri (MLT), Paula Riehn (GER)

27 March 2026; 11:15	Report	NC Chania (Greece)	7–18	(Italy) Smile Cosenza Pallanuoto	Nea Smyrni Swimming Pool, Athens; Referees: Marieke Van den Berg (NED), Martina Kunikova (SVK)
27 March 2026; 11:15	Report	Score by quarters: 1–5, 3–5, 1–4, 2–4			Nea Smyrni Swimming Pool, Athens; Referees: Marieke Van den Berg (NED), Martina Kunikova (SVK)
27 March 2026; 11:15	Report	Paterou, Niarchakou 2	Goals	three players 3	Nea Smyrni Swimming Pool, Athens; Referees: Marieke Van den Berg (NED), Martina Kunikova (SVK)

27 March 2026; 19:45	Report	CN Sant Feliu (Spain)	19–15	(Greece) NC Chania	Nea Smyrni Swimming Pool, Athens; Referees: Nikolett Sajben (HUN), Marieke Van den Berg (NED)
27 March 2026; 19:45	Report	Score by quarters: 4–2, 5–2, 3–7, 7–4			Nea Smyrni Swimming Pool, Athens; Referees: Nikolett Sajben (HUN), Marieke Van den Berg (NED)
27 March 2026; 19:45	Report	Ungría 5	Goals	Kotsia 6	Nea Smyrni Swimming Pool, Athens; Referees: Nikolett Sajben (HUN), Marieke Van den Berg (NED)

27 March 2026; 21:30	Report	Smile Cosenza Pallanuoto (Italy)	13–6	(Croatia) ŽAVK Mladost	Nea Smyrni Swimming Pool, Athens; Referees: Paula Riehn (GER), Martina Kunikova (SVK)
27 March 2026; 21:30	Report	Score by quarters: 5–0, 3–3, 4–1, 1–2			Nea Smyrni Swimming Pool, Athens; Referees: Paula Riehn (GER), Martina Kunikova (SVK)
27 March 2026; 21:30	Report	four players 4	Goals	Alamat, Stipanov 2	Nea Smyrni Swimming Pool, Athens; Referees: Paula Riehn (GER), Martina Kunikova (SVK)

== Knockout stage ==
=== 5–8 placement bracket ===
5th–8th place semifinals
(Turkey) Galatasaray Zena	9
(Croatia) ŽAVK Mladost	10
(Greece) NC Chania	9
(Romania) CSM Unirea Alba Iulia	7

Fifth place game
(Croatia) ŽAVK Mladost	12
(Greece) NC Chania	18
Seventh place game
(Turkey) Galatasaray Zena	11
(Romania) CSM Unirea Alba Iulia	5

==== 5–8 placement semifinals ====
28 March 2026; 10:00	Report	CSM Unirea Alba Iulia (Romania)	7–9	(Greece) NC Chania	Nea Smyrni Swimming Pool, Athens; Referees: Ivanka Krstonosic Rakovic (SRB), Paula Riehn (GER)
28 March 2026; 10:00	Report	Score by quarters: 1–1, 1–3, –2, 5–3			Nea Smyrni Swimming Pool, Athens; Referees: Ivanka Krstonosic Rakovic (SRB), Paula Riehn (GER)
28 March 2026; 10:00	Report	Laboncz 2	Goals	Paterou 4	Nea Smyrni Swimming Pool, Athens; Referees: Ivanka Krstonosic Rakovic (SRB), Paula Riehn (GER)

28 March 2026; 12:00	Report	ŽAVK Mladost (Croatia)	10–9	(Turkey) Galatasaray Zena	Nea Smyrni Swimming Pool, Athens; Referees: Nikolett Sajben (HUN), Eurico Silva (POR)
28 March 2026; 12:00	Report	Score by quarters: 5–3, 1–3, 2–1, 2–2			Nea Smyrni Swimming Pool, Athens; Referees: Nikolett Sajben (HUN), Eurico Silva (POR)
28 March 2026; 12:00	Report	five players 2	Goals	Emerson 3	Nea Smyrni Swimming Pool, Athens; Referees: Nikolett Sajben (HUN), Eurico Silva (POR)

==== 7th place match ====
29 March 2026; 09:00	Report	CSM Unirea Alba Iulia (Romania)	7–11	(Turkey) Galatasaray Zena	Nea Smyrni Swimming Pool, Athens; Referees: Paula Riehn (GER), Martina Kunikova (SVK)
29 March 2026; 09:00	Report	Score by quarters: 1–2, 2–4, 2–3, 0–2			Nea Smyrni Swimming Pool, Athens; Referees: Paula Riehn (GER), Martina Kunikova (SVK)
29 March 2026; 09:00	Report	Novăcean 2	Goals	Ermakova 4	Nea Smyrni Swimming Pool, Athens; Referees: Paula Riehn (GER), Martina Kunikova (SVK)

==== 5th place match ====
29 March 2026; 10:45	Report	NC Chania (Greece)	18–12	(Croatia) ŽAVK Mladost	Nea Smyrni Swimming Pool, Athens; Referees: Ivanka Krstonosic Rakovic (SRB), Eurico Silva (POR)
29 March 2026; 10:45	Report	Score by quarters: 3–0, 6–4, 6–2, 3–6			Nea Smyrni Swimming Pool, Athens; Referees: Ivanka Krstonosic Rakovic (SRB), Eurico Silva (POR)
29 March 2026; 10:45	Report	Stratidaki 6	Goals	Stipanov 4	Nea Smyrni Swimming Pool, Athens; Referees: Ivanka Krstonosic Rakovic (SRB), Eurico Silva (POR)

=== Bracket ===
Semi-finals
(Greece) Panionios GSS	12
(Spain) CN Sant Feliu	14
(Italy) Smile Cosenza Pallanuoto	13
(Spain) Tenerife Echeyde	8

Final
(Italy) Smile Cosenza Pallanuoto	14
(Spain) CN Sant Feliu	13
Third place
(Greece) Panionios GSS	13
(Spain) Tenerife Echeyde	10

==== Semi-finals ====
28 March 2026; 18:00	Report	Panionios GSS (Greece)	12–14	(Spain) CN Sant Feliu	Nea Smyrni Swimming Pool, Athens; Referees: Marieke Van den Berg (NED), Aurely Bouchez (FRA)
28 March 2026; 18:00	Report	Score by quarters: 2–4, 2–2, 2–5, 6–3			Nea Smyrni Swimming Pool, Athens; Referees: Marieke Van den Berg (NED), Aurely Bouchez (FRA)
28 March 2026; 18:00	Report	Papanastasiou, Plevritou 3	Goals	Dueñas 4	Nea Smyrni Swimming Pool, Athens; Referees: Marieke Van den Berg (NED), Aurely Bouchez (FRA)

28 March 2026; 20:00	Report	Smile Cosenza Pallanuoto (Italy)	13–8	(Spain) Tenerife Echeyde	Nea Smyrni Swimming Pool, Athens; Referees: Martina Kunikova (SVK), Massimo Angileri (MLT)
28 March 2026; 20:00	Report	Score by quarters: 0–2, 3–4, 4–0, 6–2			Nea Smyrni Swimming Pool, Athens; Referees: Martina Kunikova (SVK), Massimo Angileri (MLT)
28 March 2026; 20:00	Report	Mejier 4	Goals	Naya 3	Nea Smyrni Swimming Pool, Athens; Referees: Martina Kunikova (SVK), Massimo Angileri (MLT)

==== Third place game ====
29 March 2026; 12:30	Report	Panionios GSS (Greece)	13–10	(Spain) Tenerife Echeyde	Nea Smyrni Swimming Pool, Athens; Referees: Julien Bourges (FRA), Massimo Angileri (MLT)
29 March 2026; 12:30	Report	Score by quarters: 4–4, 4–2, 2–2, 3–2			Nea Smyrni Swimming Pool, Athens; Referees: Julien Bourges (FRA), Massimo Angileri (MLT)
29 March 2026; 12:30	Report	Bitsakou, Lampropoulou 4	Goals	De Klerr 3	Nea Smyrni Swimming Pool, Athens; Referees: Julien Bourges (FRA), Massimo Angileri (MLT)

==== Final ====
29 March 2026; 14:30	Report	CN Sant Feliu (Spain)	13–14	(Italy) Smile Cosenza Pallanuoto	Nea Smyrni Swimming Pool, Athens; Referees: Nikolett Sajben (HUN), Marieke Van den Berg (NED)
29 March 2026; 14:30	Report	Score by quarters: 1–4, 3–4, 5–4, 4–2			Nea Smyrni Swimming Pool, Athens; Referees: Nikolett Sajben (HUN), Marieke Van den Berg (NED)
29 March 2026; 14:30	Report	Dueñas, Ungría 4	Goals	Morrone 5	Nea Smyrni Swimming Pool, Athens; Referees: Nikolett Sajben (HUN), Marieke Van den Berg (NED)

2025–26 European Aquatics Women's Conference Cup Champions

Smile Cosenza Pallanuoto
First title

== See also ==
- 2025–26 European Aquatics Champions League
- 2025–26 European Aquatics Euro Cup
- 2025–26 European Aquatics Conference Cup
- 2025–26 European Aquatics Challenger Cup
- 2025 European Aquatics Super Cup
- 2025–26 European Aquatics Women's Champions League
- 2025–26 European Aquatics Women's Euro Cup
- 2025–26 European Aquatics Women's Conference Cup
- 2025–26 European Aquatics Women's Challenger Cup
- 2025 European Aquatics Women's Super Cup

Reference
Matchday 1
Matchday 2
Matchday 3
Matchday 4
