= 2025–26 European Aquatics Women's Euro Cup group stage =

Tournament information
- Sport: Water polo
- Date: 8 November 2025 – 28 February 2026
- Tournament format: Round-robin
- Teams: 16
- Website: Official website

Tournament statistics
- Matches played: 24

The 2025–26 European Aquatics Women's Euro Cup group stage is played between 8 November 2025 and 28 February 2026 to determine the eight teams advancing to the Quarterfinals of the 2025–26 European Aquatics Women's Euro Cup.

== Format ==
The 12 teams were place into four groups of three. In each group, teams will play against each other home-and-away in a round-robin format. The top two teams in each group advanced to the Quarterfinals.

Teams are ranked according to points (3 points for a win, 2 points for a penalty shootout win, 1 point for a penalty shootout loss, 0 points for a loss), and if tied on points, the following tiebreaking criteria are applied, in the order given, to determine the rankings:

- Points in head-to-head matches among tied teams;
- Goal difference in head-to-head matches among tied teams;
- Goals scored in head-to-head matches among tied teams;
- Goal difference in all group matches;
- Goals scored in all group matches.

== Draw ==
External videos
- 2025–26 European Aquatics Women's Euro Cup group stage – Draw
- Draw

The draw was on 28 July 2025 in Zagreb, Croatia. The draw started with, in order, pots 1, 2 and 3 being drawn. The position for the team within the group would then be drawn (for the purpose of the schedule). The only restriction was that clubs from the same group in the qualification round could not be drawn against each other.

=== Seeding ===
The pots were decided by as follows

- Pot 1 consisted of the teams dropping down from the Champions League
- Pot 2 consisted of the teams already qualified for the group stage
- Pot 3 consisted of the team advancing from the Euro Cup qualification round

Key to colours
Teams advancing to the Quarterfinals

Pot 1
Team	Rank	Points
(Greece) ANC Glyfada iRepair (Note: Team not known at the time of the draw. Was the Group A team in Champions League qualification which dropped down.)	14	17,595
(France) Lille UC (Note: Team not known at the time of the draw. Was the Group B team in Champions League qualification which dropped down.)	19	12,000
(France) Grand Nancy AC (Note: Team not known at the time of the draw. Was the Group C team in Champions League qualification which dropped down.)	24	7,165
(Italy) Pallanuoto Trieste (Note: Team not known at the time of the draw. Was the Group D team in Champions League qualification which dropped down.)	17	13,500

Pot 2
Team	Rank	Points
(Greece) Ethnikos OFPF	9	20,970
(Italy) Antenore Plebiscito Padova	10	20,847.5
(Hungary) BVSC Manna ABC	20	11,420
(Spain) EPlus CN Catalunya	30	4,920

Pot 3
Team	Rank	Points
(Spain) Zodiac CNAB (Note: Team not known at the time of the draw. Was the Group A winner in Euro Cup qualification.)	N/A	
(Netherlands) Polar Bears (Note: Team not known at the time of the draw. Was the Group B winner in Euro Cup qualification.)	26	6,455
(Israel) Hapoel Yokneam (Note: Team not known at the time of the draw. Was the Group C winner in Euro Cup qualification.)	39	2,905
(Hungary) III. Kerületi TVE (Note: Team not known at the time of the draw. Was the best runners-up in Euro Cup qualification.)	31	4,920

=== Draw results ===
Group A
Pos	Team
A1	(France) Lille UC
A2	(Netherlands) Polar Bears
A3	(Greece) Ethnikos OFPF

Group B
Pos	Team
B1	(Hungary) BVSC Manna ABC
B2	(Greece) ANC Glyfada iRepair
B3	(Israel) Hapoel Yokneam

Group C
Pos	Team
C1	(Italy) Antenore Plebiscito Padova
C2	(France) Grand Nancy AC
C3	(Spain) Zodiac CNAB

Group D
Pos	Team
D1	(Spain) EPlus CN Catalunya
D2	(Hungary) III. Kerületi TVE
D3	(Italy) Pallanuoto Trieste

== Groups ==
=== Group A ===
Pos	Team	Pld	W	PSW	PSL	L	GF	GA	GD	Pts	Qualification	ETH	POL	LIL
1	(Greece) Ethnikos OFPF	4	4	0	0	0	68	37	+31	12	Advance to Quarterfinals	—	15–8	23–11
2	(Netherlands) Polar Bears	4	2	0	0	2	61	44	+17	6	Advance to Quarterfinals	12–13	—	17–4
3	(France) Lille UC	4	0	0	0	4	33	81	−48	0		6–17	12–24	—

Source: European Aquatics Women's Euro Cup

8 November 2025; 20:00	Report	Lille UC (France)	6–17	(Greece) Ethnikos OFPF	Marx Dormoy Swimming Pool, Lille; Referees: Giuliana Nicolosi (ITA), Ana Belen Gonzalvo Perete (ESP)
8 November 2025; 20:00	Report	Score by quarters: 0–5, 2–3, 1–3, 3–6			Marx Dormoy Swimming Pool, Lille; Referees: Giuliana Nicolosi (ITA), Ana Belen Gonzalvo Perete (ESP)
8 November 2025; 20:00	Report	Andres, Nardini 2	Goals	Karagianni 4	Marx Dormoy Swimming Pool, Lille; Referees: Giuliana Nicolosi (ITA), Ana Belen Gonzalvo Perete (ESP)

29 November 2025; 20:30	Report	Ethnikos OFPF (Greece)	15–8	(Netherlands) Polar Bears	Papastrateio Swimming Pool, Piraeus; Referees: Juan Carlos Ezponda Colominas (ESP), Luis Santos (POR)
29 November 2025; 20:30	Report	Score by quarters: 2–1, 7–1, 2–2, 4–4			Papastrateio Swimming Pool, Piraeus; Referees: Juan Carlos Ezponda Colominas (ESP), Luis Santos (POR)
29 November 2025; 20:30	Report	three players 3	Goals	Kleinlugtebeld 3	Papastrateio Swimming Pool, Piraeus; Referees: Juan Carlos Ezponda Colominas (ESP), Luis Santos (POR)

13 December 2025; 20:00	Report	Lille UC (France)	12–24	(Netherlands) Polar Bears	Marx Dormoy Swimming Pool, Lille; Referees: Alessia Ferrari (ITA), Koppany Toth (HUN)
13 December 2025; 20:00	Report	Score by quarters: 6–6, 1–6, 2–8, 3–4			Marx Dormoy Swimming Pool, Lille; Referees: Alessia Ferrari (ITA), Koppany Toth (HUN)
13 December 2025; 20:00	Report	Andres 4	Goals	de Gier 5	Marx Dormoy Swimming Pool, Lille; Referees: Alessia Ferrari (ITA), Koppany Toth (HUN)

20 December 2025; 18:30	Report	Ethnikos OFPF (Greece)	23–11	(France) Lille UC	Papastrateio Swimming Pool, Piraeus; Referees: Nikolett Sajben (HUN), Paula Riehn (GER)
20 December 2025; 18:30	Report	Score by quarters: 4–1, 7–3, 4–3, 8–4			Papastrateio Swimming Pool, Piraeus; Referees: Nikolett Sajben (HUN), Paula Riehn (GER)
20 December 2025; 18:30	Report	Kanetidou 4	Goals	Andres, Nardini 3	Papastrateio Swimming Pool, Piraeus; Referees: Nikolett Sajben (HUN), Paula Riehn (GER)

18 February 2026; 18:00	Report	Polar Bears (Netherlands)	12–13	(Greece) Ethnikos OFPF	Zwembad De Peppel, Ede; Referees: Nikolett Sajben (HUN), Antonio Guarracino (ITA)
18 February 2026; 18:00	Report	Score by quarters: 4–3, 1–6, 4–2, 3–2			Zwembad De Peppel, Ede; Referees: Nikolett Sajben (HUN), Antonio Guarracino (ITA)
18 February 2026; 18:00	Report	de Gier, Heerink 4	Goals	Chatzikyriakaki, Kanetidou 3	Zwembad De Peppel, Ede; Referees: Nikolett Sajben (HUN), Antonio Guarracino (ITA)

28 February 2026; 18:30	Report	Polar Bears (Netherlands)	17–4	(France) Lille UC	Zwembad De Peppel, Ede; Referees: Marina Martos Fernandez (ESP), Andras Petik (HUN)
28 February 2026; 18:30	Report	Score by quarters: 5–1, 3–0, 4–1, 5–2			Zwembad De Peppel, Ede; Referees: Marina Martos Fernandez (ESP), Andras Petik (HUN)
28 February 2026; 18:30	Report	de Gier, Haksteen 3	Goals	Di Fraja 2	Zwembad De Peppel, Ede; Referees: Marina Martos Fernandez (ESP), Andras Petik (HUN)

=== Group B ===
Pos	Team	Pld	W	PSW	PSL	L	GF	GA	GD	Pts	Qualification	BVSC	GLY	HAP
1	(Hungary) BVSC Manna ABC	4	4	0	0	0	60	47	+13	12	Advance to Quarterfinals	—	13–11	15–12
2	(Greece) ANC Glyfada iRepair	4	2	0	0	2	53	41	+12	6	Advance to Quarterfinals	12–13	—	12–7
3	(Israel) Hapoel Yokneam	4	0	0	0	4	39	64	−25	0		12–19	8–18	—

Source: European Aquatics Women's Euro Cup

8 November 2025; 16:00	Report	BVSC Manna ABC (Hungary)	15–12	(Israel) Hapoel Yokneam	Laky Károly Swimming Pool, Budapest; Referees: Marta Pegado Cabanas (ESP), Anna Goncharenko (UKR)
8 November 2025; 16:00	Report	Score by quarters: 5–2, 2–2, 3–4, 5–4			Laky Károly Swimming Pool, Budapest; Referees: Marta Pegado Cabanas (ESP), Anna Goncharenko (UKR)
8 November 2025; 16:00	Report	Pocze 4	Goals	Strugo 5	Laky Károly Swimming Pool, Budapest; Referees: Marta Pegado Cabanas (ESP), Anna Goncharenko (UKR)

29 November 2025; 14:30	Report	ANC Glyfada iRepair (Greece)	12–7	(Israel) Hapoel Yokneam	"Ant. Dimitropoulos" Swimming Pool, Glyfada; Referees: Aurely Bouchard (FRA), Roberta Grillo (ITA)
29 November 2025; 14:30	Report	Score by quarters: 5–0, 3–2, 3–3, 1–2			"Ant. Dimitropoulos" Swimming Pool, Glyfada; Referees: Aurely Bouchard (FRA), Roberta Grillo (ITA)
29 November 2025; 14:30	Report	Grigoropoulou, Ochoa 3	Goals	Levinshtein 4	"Ant. Dimitropoulos" Swimming Pool, Glyfada; Referees: Aurely Bouchard (FRA), Roberta Grillo (ITA)

13 December 2025; 20:00	Report	BVSC Manna ABC (Hungary)	13–11	(Greece) ANC Glyfada iRepair	Laky Károly Swimming Pool, Budapest; Referees: Ana Belen Gonzalvo Perete (ESP), Giuliana Nicolosi (ITA)
13 December 2025; 20:00	Report	Score by quarters: 4–1, 2–2, 3–5, 4–3			Laky Károly Swimming Pool, Budapest; Referees: Ana Belen Gonzalvo Perete (ESP), Giuliana Nicolosi (ITA)
13 December 2025; 20:00	Report	Dobi 4	Goals	Turner 4	Laky Károly Swimming Pool, Budapest; Referees: Ana Belen Gonzalvo Perete (ESP), Giuliana Nicolosi (ITA)

20 December 2025; 19:00	Report	Hapoel Yokneam (Israel)	12–19	(Hungary) BVSC Manna ABC	Wingate Institute Olympic Pool, Yokneam; Referees: Karel Dvoracek (CZE), Ana Belen Gonzalvo Perete (ESP)
20 December 2025; 19:00	Report	Score by quarters: 4–7, 1–3, 3–4, 4–5			Wingate Institute Olympic Pool, Yokneam; Referees: Karel Dvoracek (CZE), Ana Belen Gonzalvo Perete (ESP)
20 December 2025; 19:00	Report	Rahum, Strugo 3	Goals	Lendway, Mucsy 4	Wingate Institute Olympic Pool, Yokneam; Referees: Karel Dvoracek (CZE), Ana Belen Gonzalvo Perete (ESP)

18 February 2026; 18:00	Report	Hapoel Yokneam (Israel)	8–18	(Greece) ANC Glyfada iRepair	Wingate Institute Olympic Pool, Yokneam; Referees: Rosa Fabregas Fernandez (ESP), Pavle Kis (SRB)
18 February 2026; 18:00	Report	Score by quarters: 2–5, 2–4, 2–5, 2–4			Wingate Institute Olympic Pool, Yokneam; Referees: Rosa Fabregas Fernandez (ESP), Pavle Kis (SRB)
18 February 2026; 18:00	Report	Levinshtein 3	Goals	Ochoa 4	Wingate Institute Olympic Pool, Yokneam; Referees: Rosa Fabregas Fernandez (ESP), Pavle Kis (SRB)

28 February 2026; 16:00	Report	ANC Glyfada iRepair (Greece)	12–13	(Hungary) BVSC Manna ABC	"Ant. Dimitropoulos" Swimming Pool, Glyfada; Referees: Ivanka Krstonosic Rakovic (SRB), Roberta Grillo (ITA)
28 February 2026; 16:00	Report	Score by quarters: 3–3, 4–3, 2–5, 3–2			"Ant. Dimitropoulos" Swimming Pool, Glyfada; Referees: Ivanka Krstonosic Rakovic (SRB), Roberta Grillo (ITA)
28 February 2026; 16:00	Report	Ochoa, Tzortzakaki 3	Goals	Mucsy, Pocze 4	"Ant. Dimitropoulos" Swimming Pool, Glyfada; Referees: Ivanka Krstonosic Rakovic (SRB), Roberta Grillo (ITA)

=== Group C ===
Pos	Team	Pld	W	PSW	PSL	L	GF	GA	GD	Pts	Qualification	ZOD	PAD	NAN
1	(Spain) Zodiac CNAB	4	3	0	0	1	80	34	+46	9 (Note: Zodiac CNAB 24–24 Antenore Plebiscito Padova. Goal difference used as tiebreaker.)	Advance to Quarterfinals	—	13–11	29–6
2	(Italy) Antenore Plebiscito Padova	4	3	0	0	1	67	37	+30	9	Advance to Quarterfinals	13–11	—	20–7
3	(France) Grand Nancy AC	4	0	0	0	4	23	99	−76	0		4–27	6–23	—

Source: European Aquatics Women's Euro Cup
Notes:

8 November 2025; 17:30	Report	Antenore Plebiscito Padova (Italy)	13–11	(Spain) Zodiac CNAB	Centro Sportivo Plebiscito, Padua; Referees: Maria Daskalopoulou (GRE), Nikolett Sajben (HUN)
8 November 2025; 17:30	Report	Score by quarters: 1–2, 6–4, 4–3, 2–2			Centro Sportivo Plebiscito, Padua; Referees: Maria Daskalopoulou (GRE), Nikolett Sajben (HUN)
8 November 2025; 17:30	Report	three players 3	Goals	Aznar Diez 4	Centro Sportivo Plebiscito, Padua; Referees: Maria Daskalopoulou (GRE), Nikolett Sajben (HUN)

28 November 2025; 13:00	Report	Grand Nancy AC (France)	4–27	(Spain) Zodiac CNAB	Lido Swimming Pool, Nancy; Referees: Andras Petik (HUN), Massimo Angileri (MLT)
28 November 2025; 13:00	Report	Score by quarters: 0–7, 1–6, 1–6, 2–8			Lido Swimming Pool, Nancy; Referees: Andras Petik (HUN), Massimo Angileri (MLT)
28 November 2025; 13:00	Report	Da Silva 2	Goals	Aznar Diez, Díaz Velázquez 5	Lido Swimming Pool, Nancy; Referees: Andras Petik (HUN), Massimo Angileri (MLT)

13 December 2025; 17:00	Report	Antenore Plebiscito Padova (Italy)	20–7	(France) Grand Nancy AC	Centro Sportivo Plebiscito, Padua; Referees: Luis Santos (POR), Emin Can Tanik (TUR)
13 December 2025; 17:00	Report	Score by quarters: 7–3, 1–2, 4–1, 8–1			Centro Sportivo Plebiscito, Padua; Referees: Luis Santos (POR), Emin Can Tanik (TUR)
13 December 2025; 17:00	Report	Bacelle, Perkins 4	Goals	Da Silva 3	Centro Sportivo Plebiscito, Padua; Referees: Luis Santos (POR), Emin Can Tanik (TUR)

20 December 2025; 12:30	Report	Zodiac CNAB (Spain)	13–11	(Italy) Antenore Plebiscito Padova	Piscina Sant Sebastià, Barcelona; Referees: Adamantia Aikaterini Saravelaki (GRE), Hendrik Schopp (GER)
20 December 2025; 12:30	Report	Score by quarters: 4–1, 3–5, 3–2, 3–3			Piscina Sant Sebastià, Barcelona; Referees: Adamantia Aikaterini Saravelaki (GRE), Hendrik Schopp (GER)
20 December 2025; 12:30	Report	Aznar Diez, Díaz Velázquez 4	Goals	Bovo 4	Piscina Sant Sebastià, Barcelona; Referees: Adamantia Aikaterini Saravelaki (GRE), Hendrik Schopp (GER)

18 February 2026; 18:00	Report	Zodiac CNAB (Spain)	29–6	(France) Grand Nancy AC	Piscina Sant Sebastià, Barcelona; Referees: Michail Birakis (GRE), Ayal Gabel (ISR)
18 February 2026; 18:00	Report	Score by quarters: 6–2, 8–1, 8–1, 7–2			Piscina Sant Sebastià, Barcelona; Referees: Michail Birakis (GRE), Ayal Gabel (ISR)
18 February 2026; 18:00	Report	Aznar Diez 6	Goals	Raspo, Süzmeçelik 2	Piscina Sant Sebastià, Barcelona; Referees: Michail Birakis (GRE), Ayal Gabel (ISR)

28 February 2026; 13:00	Report	Grand Nancy AC (France)	6–23	(Italy) Antenore Plebiscito Padova	Lido Swimming Pool, Nancy; Referees: Sander Gransjean (NED), Ferenc Miklos Toth (ROU)
28 February 2026; 13:00	Report	Score by quarters: 3–4, 1–8, 1–6, 1–5			Lido Swimming Pool, Nancy; Referees: Sander Gransjean (NED), Ferenc Miklos Toth (ROU)
28 February 2026; 13:00	Report	Da Silva 2	Goals	Bovo 5	Lido Swimming Pool, Nancy; Referees: Sander Gransjean (NED), Ferenc Miklos Toth (ROU)

=== Group D ===
Pos	Team	Pld	W	PSW	PSL	L	GF	GA	GD	Pts	Qualification	CAT	TRI	KER
1	(Spain) EPlus CN Catalunya	4	3	0	0	1	63	46	+17	9 (Note: EPlus CN Catalunya 26–25 Pallanuoto Trieste)	Advance to Quarterfinals	—	13–15	21–12
2	(Italy) Pallanuoto Trieste	4	3	0	0	1	56	43	+13	9	Advance to Quarterfinals	10–13	—	18–12
3	(Hungary) III. Kerületi TVE	4	0	0	0	4	38	68	−30	0		9–16	5–13	—

Source: European Aquatics Women's Euro Cup
Notes:

8 November 2025; 16:00	Report	EPlus CN Catalunya (Spain)	13–15	(Italy) Pallanuoto Trieste	Sant Jordi Swimming Pool, Barcelona; Referees: Anne Grandin (FRA), Marieke Van de Berg (NED)
8 November 2025; 16:00	Report	Score by quarters: 3–2, 3–4, 3–6, 4–3			Sant Jordi Swimming Pool, Barcelona; Referees: Anne Grandin (FRA), Marieke Van de Berg (NED)
8 November 2025; 16:00	Report	Falvey, Houghton 3	Goals	McDowall 5	Sant Jordi Swimming Pool, Barcelona; Referees: Anne Grandin (FRA), Marieke Van de Berg (NED)

29 November 2025; 18:30	Report	Pallanuoto Trieste (Italy)	18–12	(Hungary) III. Kerületi TVE	Bruno Bianchi Swimming Center, Trieste; Referees: Maria Daskalopoulou (GRE), Ruben Garcia (SUI)
29 November 2025; 18:30	Report	Score by quarters: 5–2, 5–2, 5–6, 3–2			Bruno Bianchi Swimming Center, Trieste; Referees: Maria Daskalopoulou (GRE), Ruben Garcia (SUI)
29 November 2025; 18:30	Report	McDowall 6	Goals	Borsos, Gyöngyössy 3	Bruno Bianchi Swimming Center, Trieste; Referees: Maria Daskalopoulou (GRE), Ruben Garcia (SUI)

13 December 2025; 16:00	Report	EPlus CN Catalunya (Spain)	21–12	(Hungary) III. Kerületi TVE	Sant Jordi Swimming Pool, Barcelona; Referees: Mihnea Alexandrescu (ROU), Bregje de Jong (NED)
13 December 2025; 16:00	Report	Score by quarters: 6–2, 4–3, 6–3, 5–4			Sant Jordi Swimming Pool, Barcelona; Referees: Mihnea Alexandrescu (ROU), Bregje de Jong (NED)
13 December 2025; 16:00	Report	Frigola 6	Goals	Rajna 5	Sant Jordi Swimming Pool, Barcelona; Referees: Mihnea Alexandrescu (ROU), Bregje de Jong (NED)

20 December 2025; 18:30	Report	Pallanuoto Trieste (Italy)	10–13	(Spain) EPlus CN Catalunya	Bruno Bianchi Swimming Center, Trieste; Referees: Maria Daskalopoulou (GRE), Ayal Gabel (ISR)
20 December 2025; 18:30	Report	Score by quarters: 2–4, 4–3, 3–4, 1–2			Bruno Bianchi Swimming Center, Trieste; Referees: Maria Daskalopoulou (GRE), Ayal Gabel (ISR)
20 December 2025; 18:30	Report	McDowall 3	Goals	Houghton 3	Bruno Bianchi Swimming Center, Trieste; Referees: Maria Daskalopoulou (GRE), Ayal Gabel (ISR)

17 February 2026; 19:00	Report	III. Kerületi TVE (Hungary)	5–13	(Italy) Pallanuoto Trieste	TVE Swimming Pool, Budapest; Referees: Bregje de Jong (NED), Slaven Sivcevic (CRO)
17 February 2026; 19:00	Report	Score by quarters: 3–4, 1–4, 1–4, 0–1			TVE Swimming Pool, Budapest; Referees: Bregje de Jong (NED), Slaven Sivcevic (CRO)
17 February 2026; 19:00	Report	Rajna, Ráski 2	Goals	McDowall 4	TVE Swimming Pool, Budapest; Referees: Bregje de Jong (NED), Slaven Sivcevic (CRO)

28 February 2026; 14:00	Report	III. Kerületi TVE (Hungary)	9–16	(Spain) EPlus CN Catalunya	TVE Swimming Pool, Budapest; Referees: Natalia Markopoulou (GRE), Robert Prelovsky (SVK)
28 February 2026; 14:00	Report	Score by quarters: 1–5, 1–4, 3–5, 4–2			TVE Swimming Pool, Budapest; Referees: Natalia Markopoulou (GRE), Robert Prelovsky (SVK)
28 February 2026; 14:00	Report	Rajna 3	Goals	Houghton 3	TVE Swimming Pool, Budapest; Referees: Natalia Markopoulou (GRE), Robert Prelovsky (SVK)

== See also ==
- 2025–26 European Aquatics Champions League
- 2025–26 European Aquatics Euro Cup
- 2025–26 European Aquatics Conference Cup
- 2025–26 European Aquatics Challenger Cup
- 2025 European Aquatics Super Cup
- 2025–26 European Aquatics Women's Champions League
- 2025–26 European Aquatics Women's Euro Cup
- 2025–26 European Aquatics Women's Conference Cup
- 2025–26 European Aquatics Women's Challenger Cup
- 2025 European Aquatics Women's Super Cup

Reference
Matchday 1
Matchday 2
Matchday 3
Matchday 4
Matchday 5
Matchday 6

Reference
Matchday 1
Matchday 2
Matchday 3
Matchday 4
Matchday 5
Matchday 6
