= 2025–26 European Aquatics Women's Euro Cup =

Water polo sports season

European Aquatics Women's Euro Cup
- 2025–26

Tournament information
- Sport: Water polo
- Date: Qualification round: 17–19 October 2025; Group stage: 8 November 2025 – 28 February 2026; Knockout stage: 14 March – 3 June 2026
- Tournament format(s): Round Robin and Knockout stage
- Teams: Qualification round: 9 (Note: From 9 countries); Group stage: 12 (Note: From 8 countries); Knockout stage: 8 Total: 13+4 (from 10 countries)
- Website: Official website

Final positions
- Champion: (Spain) EPlus CN Catalunya (1st title)
- Runner-up: (Spain) Zodiac CNAB

The 2025–26 European Aquatics Women's Euro Cup was the 27th edition of European Aquatics's secondary club competition for women's water polo clubs, and the 4th edition since being rebranded from the Trophy to the Euro Cup. The season began on 17 October 2025 and ended on 3 June 2026 with the Final.

The season witnessed a change in format for the third season in a row, while the slot allocation has changed, with only the fifth and sixth place teams allowed to play from the major leagues.

The winners of the European Aquatics Euro Cup automatically qualify for next season's Champions League (if they choose to enter) and also qualify for the 2026 Super Cup.

The defending champions were ZV De Zaan, but they will not defend their title after advancing to the Champions League group stage.

EPlus CN Catalunya won an all-Spanish final against Zodiac CNAB to secure the Euro Cup title for the first time.

== Format ==
- Qualification round

12 teams will participate in the qualification round in October 2025. The sixth place teams from national leagues ranked 1–4 plus the third and fourth place teams from national leagues ranked 5–6 take part. Countries ranked 7–12 can have their champions participate. The teams are divided into three separate groups, held in centralised venues. After round robin play, the group winners plus the best runners-up progress to the group stage.

- Group stage

Twelve teams will play in the group stage which is held between November 2025 to February 2026. The third place teams of national leagues ranked 1–4 can enter this round alongside the four clubs who advanced from the qualification round and four clubs that drop down from the Champions League. The participants are distributed into four groups of three. After home and away double round robin play, the top two from each group qualifies to the knockout stage.

- Knockout stage

The 8 teams left go into the knockout stage. There will be a Quarter-finals, Semifinals and Final. Each tie is a home and away two legged affair where the aggregate winners advance.

== Rankings ==
The results were based on the results of the past four seasons.

- Associations 1–4 can have two teams ranked 5th and 6th qualify.
- Associations 5–6 can have two teams ranked 3rd and 4th qualify.
- Associations 7–12 can have one team ranked 1st qualify.

Apart from the distribution based on the rankings, countries could have additional teams participating in the Euro Cup, as noted below:

- (CL) – Additional teams dropping down from the Champions League

Rank	Association	Points	Teams	Notes
1	Spain	146,065	2	
2	Greece	127,360	2	+1 (CL)
3	Hungary	91,557.5	2	
4	Italy	80,282.5	2	+1 (CL)
5	Netherlands	30,965	1	
6	France	29,760	0	+2 (CL)
7	Germany	12,870	0	
8	Turkey	11,295	1	
9	Croatia	8,430	1	
10	Portugal	6,940	0	

Rank	Association	Points	Teams	Notes
11	Serbia	6,280	1	
12	Malta	5,700	0	
13	Israel	5,215	1	
14	(United Kingdom) Great Britain	4,930	0	
15	Czech Republic	1,830	0	
16	Slovakia	1,715	0	
17	Romania	1,610	0	
18	Sweden	1,060	0	
19	Bulgaria	770	0	

=== Ranking facts ===
Biggest rise
Pos	Team	Ori	New	Move
1	Turkey	13	8	▲ +5
2	Czech Republic	19	15	▲ +4
3	Israel	16	13	▲ +3

Biggest fall
Pos	Team	Ori	New	Move
1	Malta	10	12	▼ –2
1	Slovakia	14	16	▼ –2
2	France	6	7	▼ –1
2	Portugal	9	10	▼ –1
2	Sweden	17	18	▼ –1
2	Bulgaria	18	19	▼ –1

New entries
Romania

Leaving entries
Russia

== Teams ==
Starting this season, only the teams finishing in fifth and sixth from national leagues ranked 1–4, the top two teams from national leagues ranked 5–6 and champions from countries ranked 7–12 are permitted to enter.

The teams who finish fifth in domestic leagues 1–4 go straight into the group stage, while everyone else plays the qualification round.

Unlike last season, in the event that a club decides not to enter, the next best ranked team is not allowed to take their place. However, this rule wasn't implemented all the time.

=== Qualified teams ===
The labels in the parentheses show how each team qualified for the place of its starting round:

- CL: Champions League title holders
- EC: Euro Cup title holders
- 1st, 2nd, 3rd, 4th,: League positions of the previous season
- CL: Transferred from the Champions League
  - QR: Transferred from the Champions League qualification round

Entry round	Teams			
Group stage	(Greece) ANC Glyfada iRepair (CL QR)	(France) Lille UC (CL QR)	(France) Grand Nancy AC (CL QR)	(Italy) Pallanuoto Trieste (CL QR)
Group stage	(Spain) EPlus CN Catalunya (6th)	(Greece) Ethnikos OFPF (5th)	(Hungary) BVSC Manna ABC (5th)	(Italy) Antenore Plebiscito Padova (5th)
Qualification round	(Spain) Zodiac CNAB (7th)	(Greece) Panionios GSS (6th)	(Hungary) III. Kerületi TVE (6th)	(Italy) ASD Bogliasco 1951 (6th)
Qualification round	(Netherlands) Polar Bears (3rd)	(Turkey) Galatasaray Zena (1st)	(Croatia) ŽAVK Mladost (1st)	(Serbia) VK Vojvodina (1st)
Qualification round	(Israel) Hapoel Yokneam (1st)			

=== Name changes ===
The following teams' names were changed during the season.

== Round and draw dates ==
=== Schedule ===
Phase	Round	Draw date	Round date
Qualification round	All rounds	28 July 2025	17–19 October 2025
Group stage	Matchday 1	28 July 2025	8 November 2025
Group stage	Matchday 2	28 July 2025	29 November 2025
Group stage	Matchday 3	28 July 2025	13 December 2025
Group stage	Matchday 4	28 July 2025	20 December 2025
Group stage	Matchday 5	28 July 2025	18 February 2026
Group stage	Matchday 6	28 July 2025	28 February 2026
Quarterfinals	First leg	2 March 2026	14 March 2026
Quarterfinals	Second leg	2 March 2026	28 March 2026
Semifinals	First leg	2 March 2026	11 April 2026
Semifinals	Second leg	2 March 2026	16 May 2026
Final	First leg	2 March 2026	27 May 2026
Final	Second leg	2 March 2026	3 June 2026

== Qualification round ==
The group winners and best runners-up qualify for the group stage, while everyone else drops down to the Conference Cup qualifiers. The draw was on 28 July 2025 in Zagreb, Croatia. The seeding is based on the club rankings.

=== Group A ===
- 17–19 October 2025, Zagreb, Croatia.

Pos	Team	Pld	W	PSW	PSL	L	GF	GA	GD	Pts	Qualification	ZOD	PAN	MLA
1	(Spain) Zodiac CNAB	2	2	0	0	0	32	12	+20	6	Group stage	—	—	18–4
2	(Greece) Panionios GSS	2	1	0	0	1	19	23	−4	3		8–14	—	—
3	(Croatia) ŽAVK Mladost (H)	2	0	0	0	2	13	29	−16	0		—	9–11	—

Source: European Aquatics Women's Euro Cup
(H) Host

=== Group B ===
- 17–19 October 2025, Ede, Netherlands.

Pos	Team	Pld	W	PSW	PSL	L	GF	GA	GD	Pts	Qualification	POL	BOG	GAL
1	(Netherlands) Polar Bears (H)	2	2	0	0	0	32	15	+17	6	Group stage	—	10–9	22–6
2	(Italy) ASD Bogliasco 1951	2	1	0	0	1	36	15	+21	3		—	—	—
3	(Turkey) Galatasaray Zena	2	0	0	0	2	11	49	−38	0		—	5–27	—

Source: European Aquatics Women's Euro Cup
(H) Host

=== Group C ===
- 17–19 October 2025, Vojvodina, Serbia.

Pos	Team	Pld	W	PSW	PSL	L	GF	GA	GD	Pts	Qualification	HAP	KER	VOJ
1	(Israel) Hapoel Yokneam	2	1	1	0	0	32	27	+5	5	Group stage	—	—	—
2	(Hungary) III. Kerületi TVE	2	1	0	1	0	32	30	+2	4	Group stage	19–20 (Note: Match ended 15–15, Hapoel Yokneam won 5–4 on penalties.)	—	—
3	(Serbia) VK Vojvodina (H)	2	0	0	0	2	18	25	−7	0		8–12	10–13	—

Source: European Aquatics Women's Euro Cup
(H) Host

=== Ranking of second-placed teams ===
Pos	Grp	Team	Pld	W	PSW	PSL	L	GF	GA	GD	Pts	Qualification
1	C	(Hungary) III. Kerületi TVE	2	1	0	1	0	32	30	+2	4	Group stage
2	B	(Italy) ASD Bogliasco 1951	2	1	0	0	1	36	15	+21	3	
3	A	(Greece) Panionios GSS	2	1	0	0	1	19	23	−4	3	

Source: European Aquatics Women's Euro Cup
Rules for classification: 1) points; 2) goal difference; 3) number of goals scored.

== Group stage ==
Location of teams of the 2025–26 European Aquatics Women's Euro Cup group stage.
Red: Group A; Blue: Group B; Yellow: Group C; Green: Group D.

The draw took place on 28 July 2025 in Zagreb, Croatia. The top two advance to the Quarterfinals.

Teams are ranked according to points (3 points for a win, 2 points for a penalty shootout win, 1 point for a penalty shootout loss, 0 points for a loss), and if tied on points, the following tiebreaking criteria are applied, in the order given, to determine the rankings:

- Points in head-to-head matches among tied teams;
- Goal difference in head-to-head matches among tied teams;
- Goals scored in head-to-head matches among tied teams;
- Goal difference in all group matches;
- Goals scored in all group matches.

Eight countries are being represented. Hapoel Yoknoam became the first Israeli team, male or female, to take part in the group stage of a club competition.

=== Group A ===
Pos	Team	Pld	W	PSW	PSL	L	GF	GA	GD	Pts	Qualification	ETH	POL	LIL
1	(Greece) Ethnikos OFPF	4	4	0	0	0	68	37	+31	12	Advance to Quarterfinals	—	15–8	23–11
2	(Netherlands) Polar Bears	4	2	0	0	2	61	44	+17	6	Advance to Quarterfinals	12–13	—	17–4
3	(France) Lille UC	4	0	0	0	4	33	81	−48	0		6–17	12–24	—

Source: European Aquatics Women's Euro Cup

=== Group B ===
Pos	Team	Pld	W	PSW	PSL	L	GF	GA	GD	Pts	Qualification	BVSC	GLY	HAP
1	(Hungary) BVSC Manna ABC	4	4	0	0	0	60	47	+13	12	Advance to Quarterfinals	—	13–11	15–12
2	(Greece) ANC Glyfada iRepair	4	2	0	0	2	53	41	+12	6	Advance to Quarterfinals	12–13	—	12–7
3	(Israel) Hapoel Yokneam	4	0	0	0	4	39	64	−25	0		12–19	8–18	—

Source: European Aquatics Women's Euro Cup

=== Group C ===
Pos	Team	Pld	W	PSW	PSL	L	GF	GA	GD	Pts	Qualification	ZOD	PAD	NAN
1	(Spain) Zodiac CNAB	4	3	0	0	1	80	34	+46	9 (Note: Zodiac CNAB 24–24 Antenore Plebiscito Padova. Goal difference used as tiebreaker.)	Advance to Quarterfinals	—	13–11	29–6
2	(Italy) Antenore Plebiscito Padova	4	3	0	0	1	67	37	+30	9	Advance to Quarterfinals	13–11	—	20–7
3	(France) Grand Nancy AC	4	0	0	0	4	23	99	−76	0		4–27	6–23	—

Source: European Aquatics Women's Euro Cup

=== Group D ===
Pos	Team	Pld	W	PSW	PSL	L	GF	GA	GD	Pts	Qualification	CAT	TRI	KER
1	(Spain) EPlus CN Catalunya	4	3	0	0	1	63	46	+17	9 (Note: EPlus CN Catalunya 26–25 Pallanuoto Trieste)	Advance to Quarterfinals	—	13–15	21–12
2	(Italy) Pallanuoto Trieste	4	3	0	0	1	56	43	+13	9	Advance to Quarterfinals	10–13	—	18–12
3	(Hungary) III. Kerületi TVE	4	0	0	0	4	38	68	−30	0		9–16	5–13	—

Source: European Aquatics Women's Euro Cup

== Knockout stage ==
=== Bracket ===
In the knockout phase, teams played against each other over two legs on a home-and-away basis.

Quarterfinals
(Greece) ANC Glyfada iRepair	8	11	19
(Spain) EPlus CN Catalunya	8	12	20
(Italy) Antenore Plebiscito Padova	9	8	17
(Hungary) BVSC Manna ABC	11	13	24
(Spain) Zodiac CNAB	10	13	23
(Netherlands) Polar Bears	9	12	21
(Greece) Ethnikos OFPF	8	8	16
(Italy) Pallanuoto Trieste	9	10	19

Semifinals
(Spain) EPlus CN Catalunya	13	11	24
(Hungary) BVSC Manna ABC	13	4	17
(Spain) Zodiac CNAB	12	14	26
(Italy) Pallanuoto Trieste	12	13	25

Final
(Spain) EPlus CN Catalunya	14	13	27
(Spain) Zodiac CNAB	9	11	20

=== Quarterfinals ===
The first legs were played on 14 March, and the second legs were played on 28 March.

Team 1	Agg.	Team 2	1st leg	2nd leg
ANC Glyfada iRepair (Greece)	19–20	(Spain) EPlus CN Catalunya	8–8	11–12
Antenore Plebiscito Padova (Italy)	17–24	(Hungary) BVSC Manna ABC	9–11	8–13
Zodiac CNAB (Spain)	23–21	(Netherlands) Polar Bears	10–9	13–12
Ethnikos OFPF (Greece)	16–19	(Italy) Pallanuoto Trieste	8–9	8–10

=== Semifinals ===
The first legs were played on 11 April, and the second legs were played on 16 May.

Team 1	Agg.	Team 2	1st leg	2nd leg
EPlus CN Catalunya (Spain)	24–17	(Hungary) BVSC Manna ABC	13–13	11–4
Zodiac CNAB (Spain)	26–25	(Italy) Pallanuoto Trieste	12–12	14–13

=== Final ===
The first leg was played on 27 May, and the second leg was played on 3 June.

Team 1	Agg.	Team 2	1st leg	2nd leg
EPlus CN Catalunya (Spain)	27–20	(Spain) Zodiac CNAB	14–9	13–11

2025–26 European Aquatics Women's Euro Cup Champions

EPlus CN Catalunya
First title

== See also ==
- 2025–26 European Aquatics Champions League
- 2025–26 European Aquatics Euro Cup
- 2025–26 European Aquatics Conference Cup
- 2025–26 European Aquatics Challenger Cup
- 2025 European Aquatics Super Cup
- 2025–26 European Aquatics Women's Champions League
- 2025–26 European Aquatics Women's Conference Cup
- 2025–26 European Aquatics Women's Challenger Cup
- 2025 European Aquatics Women's Super Cup
