= 2025–26 European Aquatics Women's Conference Cup =

Water polo sports season

European Aquatics Women's Conference Cup
- 2025–26

Tournament information
- Sport: Water polo
- Date: Qualification Round I: 14–16 November 2025; Qualification Round II: 27 February – 1 March 2026; Final Eight: 26–29 March 2026
- Tournament format(s): Round Robin and Knockout stage
- Teams: Qualification round I: 16 (Note: From 9 countries); Qualification round II: 8+5 (Note: From 7 countries); Final Eight: 8 Total: 16+5 (from 12 countries)
- Website: Official website

Final positions
- Champion: (Italy) Smile Cosenza Pallanuoto
- Runner-up: (Spain) CN Sant Feliu

The 2025–26 European Aquatics Women's Conference Cup is the 1st edition of European Aquatics's new tertiary club competition (replacing the Challenger Cup) for women's water polo clubs. The season begins on 14 November 2025 and ended on 29 March 2026 with the Final Eight.

The winners of the European Aquatics Conference Cup automatically qualify for next season's Euro Cup, (if they choose to enter).

Smile Cosenza Pallanuoto their first title after beating CN Sant Feliu 14–13 in the final in Athens.

== Rankings ==
The results were based on the results of the past four seasons.

- Associations 1–4 can have two teams ranked 7th and 8th qualify.
- Associations 5–6 can have two teams ranked 5th and 6th qualify.
- Associations 7–12 can have one team ranked 2nd and 3rd qualify.
- Associations 13 and below can have one team ranked 1st qualify.

Apart from the distribution based on the rankings, countries could have additional teams participating in the Conference Cup, as noted below:

- (EC) – Additional teams dropping down from the Euro Cup

Rank	Association	Points	Teams	Notes
1	Spain	146,065	2	
2	Greece	127,360	2	+1 (EC)
3	Hungary	91,557.5	0	
4	Italy	80,282.5	2	+1 (EC)
5	Netherlands	30,965	1	
6	France	29,760	0	
7	Germany	12,870	1	
8	Turkey	11,295	2	+1 (EC)
9	Croatia	8,430	1	+1 (EC)
10	Portugal	6,940	1	

Rank	Association	Points	Teams	Notes
11	Serbia	6,280	1	+1 (EC)
12	Malta	5,700	2	
13	Israel	5,215	0	
14	(United Kingdom) Great Britain	4,930	0	
15	Czech Republic	1,830	0	
16	Slovakia	1,715	0	
17	Romania	1,610	1	
18	Sweden	1,060	0	
19	Bulgaria	770	0	

=== Ranking facts ===
Biggest rise
Pos	Team	Ori	New	Move
1	Turkey	13	8	▲ +5
2	Czech Republic	19	15	▲ +4
3	Israel	16	13	▲ +3

Biggest fall
Pos	Team	Ori	New	Move
1	Malta	10	12	▼ –2
1	Slovakia	14	16	▼ –2
2	France	6	7	▼ –1
2	Portugal	9	10	▼ –1
2	Sweden	17	18	▼ –1
2	Bulgaria	18	19	▼ –1

New entries
Romania

Leaving entries
Russia

== Teams ==
The teams finishing in seventh and eighth from national leagues ranked 1–4, placing in fifth and sixth from national leagues ranked 5–6, the teams finishing in second through third from countries ranked 7–12 and champions from countries ranked 13 and below are permitted to enter.

Everyone who enters starts in the qualification round I.

Unlike last season, in the event that a club decides not to enter, the next best ranked team is not allowed to take their place. However, this rule wasn't implemented all the time.

=== Qualified teams ===
The labels in the parentheses show how each team qualified for the place of its starting round:

- 1st, 2nd, 3rd, 4th, etc: League positions of the previous season
- EC: Transferred from the Euro Cup
  - QR: Transferred from the Euro Cup qualification round

Entry round	Teams			
Qualification round II	(Greece) Panionios GSS (EC QR)	(Croatia) ŽAVK Mladost (EC QR)	(Italy) ASD Bogliasco 1951 (EC QR)	(Turkey) Galatasaray Zena (EC QR)
Qualification round II	(Serbia) VK Vojvodina (EC QR)			
Qualification round I	(Spain) CN Sant Feliu (8th)	(Spain) Tenerife Echeyde (9th)	(Greece) AC PAOK (7th)	(Greece) NC Chania (8th)
Qualification round I	(Italy) Smile Cosenza Pallanuoto (7th)	(Italy) Brizz Nuoto (8th)	(Netherlands) ZVL 1886 (6th)	(Germany) SV Blau-Weiss (2nd)
Qualification round I	(Turkey) Goztepe SK (2nd)	(Turkey) Dalton Koleji SK (3rd)	(Croatia) Jadran Split (2nd)	(Portugal) Clube Fluvial (2nd)
Qualification round I	(Serbia) ZVK Crvena Zvezda (2nd)	(Malta) Sirens ASC (1st)	(Malta) San Giljan ASC (3rd)	(Romania) CSM Unirea Alba Iulia (1st)

=== Name changes ===
The following teams' names were changed during the season.

Original name	New name	Matchday
(Italy) Cosenza Pallanuoto	(Italy) Smile Cosenza Pallanuoto	Qualification round I

== Rounds and draw dates ==
=== Schedule ===
Phase	Draw date	Round date
Qualification round I	11 August 2025	14–16 November 2025
Qualification round II	19 November 2025	27 February – 1 March 2026
Final Eight	2 March 2026	26–29 March 2026

== Qualification round I ==
The top two qualify for the next round, while every team that comes from a country that is ranked below the top seven drop down to the Challenger Cup. The draw was on 11 August 2025 in Zagreb, Croatia. The seeding is based on the club rankings.

=== Group A ===
- 14–16 November 2025, San Giljan, Malta.

Pos	Team	Pld	W	PSW	PSL	L	GF	GA	GD	Pts	Qualification	FEL	BLA	GOZ	GIL
1	(Spain) CN Sant Feliu	3	3	0	0	0	66	19	+47	9	Qualification round II	—	—	—	—
2	(Germany) SV Blau-Weiss	3	2	0	0	1	41	34	+7	6	Qualification round II	8–15	—	15–12	—
3	(Turkey) Goztepe SK	3	1	0	0	2	38	39	−1	3		8–20	—	—	—
4	(Malta) San Giljan ASC (H)	3	0	0	0	3	14	67	−53	0		3–31	7–18	4–18	—

Source: European Aquatics Women's Conference Cup
(H) Host

=== Group B ===
- 14–16 November 2025, Alba Iulia, Romania.

Pos	Team	Pld	W	PSW	PSL	L	GF	GA	GD	Pts	Qualification	COS	UNI	JAD	CRV
1	(Italy) Smile Cosenza Pallanuoto	3	3	0	0	0	50	9	+41	9	Qualification round II	—	—	21–3	16–3
2	(Romania) CSM Unirea Alba Iulia (H)	3	2	0	0	1	34	28	+6	6	Qualification round II	3–13	—	11–10	20–5
3	(Croatia) Jadran Split	3	1	0	0	2	29	35	−6	3		—	—	—	16–3
4	(Serbia) ZVK Crvena Zvezda	3	0	0	0	3	11	52	−41	0		—	—	—	—

Source: European Aquatics Women's Conference Cup
(H) Host

=== Group C ===
- 14–16 November 2025, Acireale, Italy.

Pos	Team	Pld	W	PSW	PSL	L	GF	GA	GD	Pts	Qualification	TEN	BRI	FLU	DAL
1	(Spain) Tenerife Echeyde	3	3	0	0	0	47	15	+32	9	Qualification round II	—	11–7	—	17–3
2	(Italy) Brizz Nuoto (H)	3	2	0	0	1	52	23	+29	6	Qualification round II	—	—	—	—
3	(Portugal) Clube Fluvial	3	1	0	0	2	29	54	−25	3		5–19	6–20	—	18–15
4	(Turkey) Dalton Koleji SK	3	0	0	0	3	24	60	−36	0		—	6–25	—	—

Source: European Aquatics Women's Conference Cup
(H) Host

=== Group D ===
- 14–16 November 2025, Valletta, Malta.

Pos	Team	Pld	W	PSW	PSL	L	GF	GA	GD	Pts	Qualification	PAOK	CHA	ZVL	SIR
1	(Greece) AC PAOK	3	3	0	0	0	66	35	+31	9	Qualification round II	—	21–12	21–16	—
2	(Greece) NC Chania	3	1	1	0	1	35	37	−2	5	Qualification round II	—	—	11–9 (Note: Match ended 7–7, NC Chania 4–2 on penalties.)	—
3	(Netherlands) ZVL 1886	3	1	0	1	1	42	34	+8	4		—	—	—	—
4	(Malta) Sirens ASC (H)	3	0	0	0	3	16	53	−37	0		7–24	7–12	2–17	—

Source: European Aquatics Women's Conference Cup
(H) Host

== Qualification round II ==
The top two teams in each group qualify will advance to the next round. The draw was on 19 November 2025 in Zagreb, Croatia.

=== Group A ===
27 February – 1 March 2026, Alba Iulia, Romania.

Pos	Team	Pld	W	PSW	PSL	L	GF	GA	GD	Pts	Qualification	FEL	UNI	BOG
1	(Spain) CN Sant Feliu	2	1	1	0	0	26	18	+8	5	Advance to Final Eight	—	15–7	—
2	(Romania) CSM Unirea Alba Iulia (H)	2	1	0	0	1	15	22	−7	3	Advance to Final Eight	—	—	8–7
3	(Italy) ASD Bogliasco 1951	2	0	0	1	1	18	19	−1	1		17–18 (Note: Match ended 11–11. CN Sant Feliu won 7–6 on penalties.)	—	—

Source: European Aquatics Women's Conference Cup
(H) Host

=== Group B ===
27 February – 1 March 2026, Nea Smyrni, Greece.

Pos	Team	Pld	W	PSW	PSL	L	GF	GA	GD	Pts	Qualification	COS	PAN	PAOK
1	(Italy) Smile Cosenza Pallanuoto	2	2	0	0	0	27	23	+4	6	Advance to Final Eight	—	—	—
2	(Greece) Panionios GSS (H)	2	1	0	0	1	27	24	+3	3	Advance to Final Eight	16–17	—	—
3	(Greece) AC PAOK	2	0	0	0	2	14	21	−7	0		7–10	7–11	—

Source: European Aquatics Women's Conference Cup
(H) Host

=== Group C ===
27 February – 1 March 2026, Novi Sad, Serbia.

Pos	Team	Pld	W	PSW	PSL	L	GF	GA	GD	Pts	Qualification	TEN	CHA	NEV	BLA
1	(Spain) Tenerife Echeyde	3	3	0	0	0	50	32	+18	9	Advance to Final Eight	—	—	—	19–9
2	(Greece) NC Chania	3	1	0	0	2	42	41	+1	3 (Note: Head to head goal difference: NC Chania 3 Pts, +4 GD; VK Vojvodina 3 Pts, +1 GD; SV Blau-Weiss 3 Pts, −5 GD)	Advance to Final Eight	13–16	—	—	—
3	(Serbia) VK Vojvodina (H)	3	1	0	0	2	39	43	−4	3		10–15	14–12	—	15–16
4	(Germany) SV Blau-Weiss	3	1	0	0	2	36	51	−15	3		—	11–17	—	—

Source: European Aquatics Women's Conference Cup
(H) Host

=== Group D ===
27 February – 1 March 2026, Istanbul, Turkey.

Pos	Team	Pld	W	PSW	PSL	L	GF	GA	GD	Pts	Qualification	GAL	MLA	BRI
1	(Turkey) Galatasaray Zena (H)	2	2	0	0	0	23	18	+5	6	Advance to Final Eight	—	13–11	10–7
2	(Croatia) ŽAVK Mladost	2	0	1	0	1	27	27	0	2	Advance to Final Eight	—	—	16–14 (Note: Match ended 12–12. ŽAVK Mladost won 4–2 on penalties.)
3	(Italy) Brizz Nuoto	2	0	0	1	1	21	26	−5	1		—	—	—

Source: European Aquatics Women's Conference Cup
(H) Host

== Final Eight ==
The draw was on 2 March 2026 in Zagreb, Croatia. The Final Eight was held in Athens by Panionios GSS from 26–29 March 2026.

=== Group A ===
Pos	Team	Pld	W	PSW	PSL	L	GF	GA	GD	Pts	Qualification	PAN	TEN	GAL	UNI
1	(Greece) Panionios GSS (H)	3	3	0	0	0	43	19	+24	9	Semi-finals	—	—	—	—
2	(Turkey) Galatasaray Zena	3	2	0	0	1	50	37	+13	6	Semi-finals	6–13	—	—	15–10
3	(Spain) Tenerife Echeyde	3	1	0	0	2	33	40	−7	3	5–8 placement bracket	11–16	17–12	—	22–9
4	(Romania) CSM Unirea Alba Iulia	3	0	0	0	3	21	51	−30	0	5–8 placement bracket	2–14	—	—	—

Source: European Aquatics Women's Conference Cup
(H) Host

=== Group B ===
Pos	Team	Pld	W	PSW	PSL	L	GF	GA	GD	Pts	Qualification	COS	FEL	CHA	MLA
1	(Italy) Smile Cosenza Pallanuoto	3	3	0	0	0	46	25	+21	9	Semi-finals	—	15–12	—	13–6
2	(Spain) CN Sant Feliu	3	2	0	0	1	47	34	+13	6	Semi-finals	—	—	19–15	16–4
3	(Greece) NC Chania	3	1	0	0	2	35	46	−11	3	5–8 placement bracket	7–18	—	—	—
4	(Croatia) ŽAVK Mladost	3	0	0	0	3	19	42	−23	0	5–8 placement bracket	—	—	9–13	—

Source: European Aquatics Women's Conference Cup

=== Knockout stage ===
==== 5–8 placement bracket ====
5th–8th place semifinals
(Turkey) Galatasaray Zena	9
(Croatia) ŽAVK Mladost	10
(Greece) NC Chania	9
(Romania) CSM Unirea Alba Iulia	7

Fifth place game
(Croatia) ŽAVK Mladost	12
(Greece) NC Chania	18
Seventh place game
(Turkey) Galatasaray Zena	11
(Romania) CSM Unirea Alba Iulia	5

==== Bracket ====
Semi-finals
(Greece) Panionios GSS	12
(Spain) CN Sant Feliu	14
(Italy) Smile Cosenza Pallanuoto	13
(Spain) Tenerife Echeyde	8

Final
(Italy) Smile Cosenza Pallanuoto	14
(Spain) CN Sant Feliu	13
Third place
(Greece) Panionios GSS	13
(Spain) Tenerife Echeyde	10

==== Third place game ====
29 March 2026; 12:30	Report	Panionios GSS (Greece)	13–10	(Spain) Tenerife Echeyde	Nea Smyrni Swimming Pool, Athens; Referees: Julien Bourges (FRA), Massimo Angileri (MLT)
29 March 2026; 12:30	Report	Score by quarters: 4–4, 4–2, 2–2, 3–2			Nea Smyrni Swimming Pool, Athens; Referees: Julien Bourges (FRA), Massimo Angileri (MLT)
29 March 2026; 12:30	Report	Bitsakou, Lampropoulou 4	Goals	De Klerr 3	Nea Smyrni Swimming Pool, Athens; Referees: Julien Bourges (FRA), Massimo Angileri (MLT)

==== Final ====
29 March 2026; 14:30	Report	CN Sant Feliu (Spain)	13–14	(Italy) Smile Cosenza Pallanuoto	Nea Smyrni Swimming Pool, Athens; Referees: Nikolett Sajben (HUN), Marieke Van den Berg (NED)
29 March 2026; 14:30	Report	Score by quarters: 1–4, 3–4, 5–4, 4–2			Nea Smyrni Swimming Pool, Athens; Referees: Nikolett Sajben (HUN), Marieke Van den Berg (NED)
29 March 2026; 14:30	Report	Dueñas, Ungría 4	Goals	Morrone 5	Nea Smyrni Swimming Pool, Athens; Referees: Nikolett Sajben (HUN), Marieke Van den Berg (NED)

2025–26 European Aquatics Women's Conference Cup Champions

Smile Cosenza Pallanuoto
First title

== See also ==
- 2025–26 European Aquatics Champions League
- 2025–26 European Aquatics Euro Cup
- 2025–26 European Aquatics Conference Cup
- 2025–26 European Aquatics Challenger Cup
- 2025 European Aquatics Super Cup
- 2025–26 European Aquatics Women's Champions League
- 2025–26 European Aquatics Women's Euro Cup
- 2025–26 European Aquatics Women's Challenger Cup
- 2025 European Aquatics Women's Super Cup
