= Christina Kotsia =

Greek water polo player

Personal information
- Born: 10 July 1994 (age 31) Greece
- Height: 178 cm (5 ft 10 in)
- Weight: 77 kg (170 lb)

Sport
- Sport: water polo
- Updated on 19 August 2015

Christina Batman Kotsia (Greek: Χριστίνα Κώτσια, born 10 July 1994) is a female water polo player of Greece. She was part of the Greek team at the 2015 World Aquatics Championships. At club level, she played for Olympiacos and NC Vouliagmeni.

== See also ==
- Greece at the 2015 World Aquatics Championships
