= P.A.O.K. Water Polo Club =

PAOK Water Polo
- Nickname: Two-Headed Eagle of the North
- Founded: 1931
- League: A1 Ethniki Water Polo
- Based in: Thessaloniki, Greece
- Arena: Poseidonio Hall
- Colors: Black, White
- President: Athanasios Katsaris
- Head coach: Theodoros Chatzitheodorou
- Website: acpaok.gr

P.A.O.K. Water Polo Club is the men's water polo team of the major Greek multi-sport club P.A.O.K., based in Thessaloniki. It was founded in 1931.

== Current roster ==
2016–2017

Number	Nationality	Player	Height	Date of Birth
Goalkeepers (3)
	(Greece)	Filippos Karampetsos
1	(Greece)	Stratos Kechagias
13	(Greece)	Rafael Forotzidis
Defense (3)
3	(Greece)	Dimitrios Miteloudis
2	(Greece)	Nikos Prosiniklis
6	(Greece)	Giorgos Tzelatis
Offense (3)
8	(Greece)	Dimitris Nikolaidis
12	(Greece)	Manolis Solanakis
	(Montenegro)	Jovan Sarič
Midfield (8)
7	(Greece)	Christos Papapostolou
9	(Greece)	Nikos Dimitriadis
15	(Greece)	Paulos Mouratidis
	(Slovakia)	Juraj Zaťovič
11	(Greece)	Nikos Tsolakoudis
5	(Greece)	Giannis Kocheilas
10	(Greece)	Giannis Thomakos
4	(Greece)	Christos Koutsialis
Coach
	(Greece)	Theodoros Chatzitheodorou
