= Edese Zwem- & Poloclub Polar Bears =

Dutch water polo club

Coordinates: 52.0358°N 5.6396°E

Edese Zwem- & Poloclub Polar Bears, Edese Zwemclub Polar Bears (EZC Polar Bears), or simply Polar Bears Ede, is a swimming and water polo club based in the city of Ede, Netherlands.

== History ==
The club was founded in 1946 and the name (Polar Bears) is a tribute to the Polar Bear Division (49th (West Riding) Infantry Division), a British military unit composed not only of British but also Polish and Canadian troops, which freed the city of Ede from Nazi Germany in 1945.

== Titles & achievements ==
Dutch League

- Winners (8): 1989-90, 1990–91, 1991–92, 1994–95, 1995–96, 2004–05, 2005–06, 2006-07

Dutch Cup (KZNB)

- Winners (5): 1991-92, 1993–94, 2005–06, 2012-13, 2015-16

Dutch Cup (KZNB) 2

- Winners (1): 2009-10

=== European competitions ===
LEN Champions League

- Semifinalist (2): 1991-92, 1992–93
