= Galatasaray women's water polo team =

Water polo team of the Turkish sports club Galatasaray SK

Galatasaray Women's Water Polo Team
- Founded: 2009
- League: Kadınlar 1. Lig (sutopu)
- Based in: İstanbul, Turkey
- Arena: Galatasaray Kalamış Facilities
- Colors: Yellow & Red
- President: Dursun Özbek
- Championships: 4
- Mascot: Lion
- Website: http://www.galatasaray.org/susporlari/sutopu/

Galatasaray Women's Water Polo Team is the water polo team of the Turkish sports club Galatasaray S.K.

In 2012, Galatasaray Women's Water Polo Team won Turkish Water Polo Championship Cup.

== Current squad ==
As of December 12, 2024

Number	Player	Date of Birth
1	(Turkey) Elif Dilara Aydınlık	July 19, 1999
2	(Turkey) Elif Gurelli	January 4, 2006
3	(Turkey) Dilara Buralı	March 27, 2000
4	(Russia) Elvira Ermakova	March 22, 2001
5	(Russia) Elizaveta Ivanova	December 25, 2000
6	(Turkey) Ecehan Gökçe Temel	April 12, 2000
7	(Turkey) Alara Ataman	July 24, 2007
8	(Turkey) Dilara Rabia Yarayan	June 20, 2006
9	(Turkey) Duru Kaleağası	June 6, 2005
11	(Turkey) Naz Özdemir	March 27, 2008
12	(Turkey) Damla Ezgi Moğultay	April 5, 2005
13	(Turkey) Duru Ilter	April 29, 2008

== Domestic success ==
- Kadınlar 1. Lig (sutopu)
  - Winners (4): 2011–12, 2012–13, 2018–19, 2024–25
  - Runners-up (7): 2013–14, 2016–17, 2017–18, 2021–22, 2022–23, 2023–24, 2025–26
