= 2025–26 European Aquatics Challenger Cup qualification round II =

Tournament information
- Sport: Water polo
- Date: 13–15 February 2026
- Host(s): (Lithuania) Elektrėnai (Slovenia) Maribor (Turkey) Istanbul
- Teams: 12 (from 9 countries)
- Website: Official website

Tournament statistics
- Matches played: 12

The 2025–26 European Aquatics Challenger Cup qualification round II is played between 13 and 15 February 2026 to determine the 8 teams advancing to the Final Eight of the 2025–26 European Aquatics Challenger Cup.

== Format ==
The 12 teams were placed into four groups of three. In each group, teams will play against each other once in a round-robin format. The top two in each group advance to the next round.

Teams are ranked according to points (3 points for a win, 2 points for a penalty shootout win, 1 point for a penalty shootout loss, 0 points for a loss), and if tied on points, the following tiebreaking criteria are applied, in the order given, to determine the rankings:

- Points in head-to-head matches among tied teams;
- Goal difference in head-to-head matches among tied teams;
- Goals scored in head-to-head matches among tied teams;
- Goal difference in all group matches;
- Goals scored in all group matches.

== Draw ==
External videos
- 2025–26 European Aquatics Challenger Cup qualification round II – Draw
- Draw

The draw was on 19 November 2025 in Zagreb, Croatia. The clubs that in the same group in the previous round (in both Conference and Challenger Cup) could not be drawn against each other. (H) indicates which clubs is hosting a group.

=== Seeding ===
The pots were decided by as follows:

- Pot 1 consisted of the teams eliminated from Conference Cup qualification round I
- Pot 2 consisted of the group winners of the Challenger Cup qualification round I
- Pot 3 consisted of the group runners-up of the Challenger Cup qualification round I.

Key to colours
Teams advancing to Final Eight

Pot 1
Team
(Portugal) Vitória SC
(Bosnia and Herzegovina) VK Banja Luka
(Lithuania) EVK Zaibas (H)
(Turkey) Galatasaray SK (H)

Pot 2
Team
(Malta) Sliema ASC Nexawin
(Slovenia) AVK Branik Maribor (H)
(Turkey) Enka Sport Club
(Belgium) RD Mouscronnois

Pot 3
Team
(Malta) San Giljan ASC
(Switzerland) Carouge Natation
(Turkey) Heybeliada ASC
(Finland) Cetus Espoo

== Groups ==
=== Group A ===
13–15 February 2026, Elektrėnai, Lithuania.

Pos	Team	Pld	W	PSW	PSL	L	GF	GA	GD	Pts	Qualification	SLI	ZAI	CET
1	(Malta) Sliema ASC Nexawin	2	2	0	0	0	35	24	+11	6	Final Eight	—	—	23–14
2	(Lithuania) EVK Zaibas (H)	2	1	0	0	1	31	23	+8	3	Final Eight	10–12	—	21–11
3	(Finland) Cetus Espoo	2	0	0	0	2	25	44	−19	0		—	—	—

Source: European Aquatics Challenger Cup
(H) Host

13 February 2026; 19:30	Report	EVK Zaibas (Lithuania)	21–11	(Finland) Cetus Espoo	Elektrėnai Swimming Pool, Elektrėnai; Referees: Neven Spoljaric (BIH), Florian Antheunis (BEL)
13 February 2026; 19:30	Report	Score by quarters: 5–1, 7–4, 3–3, 6–3			Elektrėnai Swimming Pool, Elektrėnai; Referees: Neven Spoljaric (BIH), Florian Antheunis (BEL)
13 February 2026; 19:30	Report	Jonkus, Vrdoljak 4	Goals	three players 3	Elektrėnai Swimming Pool, Elektrėnai; Referees: Neven Spoljaric (BIH), Florian Antheunis (BEL)

14 February 2026; 19:00	Report	Sliema ASC Nexawin (Malta)	23–14	(Finland) Cetus Espoo	Elektrėnai Swimming Pool, Elektrėnai; Referees: Emin Can Tanik (TUR), Neven Spoljaric (BIH)
14 February 2026; 19:00	Report	Score by quarters: 7–4, 5–5, 5–1, 6–4			Elektrėnai Swimming Pool, Elektrėnai; Referees: Emin Can Tanik (TUR), Neven Spoljaric (BIH)
14 February 2026; 19:00	Report	Cassar 4	Goals	Krivokapic 4	Elektrėnai Swimming Pool, Elektrėnai; Referees: Emin Can Tanik (TUR), Neven Spoljaric (BIH)

15 February 2026; 11:00	Report	EVK Zaibas (Lithuania)	10–12	(Malta) Sliema ASC Nexawin	Elektrėnai Swimming Pool, Elektrėnai; Referees: Emin Can Tanik (TUR), Florian Antheunis (BEL)
15 February 2026; 11:00	Report	Score by quarters: 2–3, 3–4, 2–3, 3–2			Elektrėnai Swimming Pool, Elektrėnai; Referees: Emin Can Tanik (TUR), Florian Antheunis (BEL)
15 February 2026; 11:00	Report	Bakulo, Krapić 3	Goals	Galea 3	Elektrėnai Swimming Pool, Elektrėnai; Referees: Emin Can Tanik (TUR), Florian Antheunis (BEL)

=== Group B ===
13–15 February 2026, Maribor, Slovenia.

Pos	Team	Pld	W	PSW	PSL	L	GF	GA	GD	Pts	Qualification	GIL	MAR	BAN
1	(Malta) San Giljan ASC	2	2	0	0	0	48	21	+27	6	Final Eight	—	—	—
2	(Slovenia) AVK Branik Maribor (H)	2	1	0	0	1	53	32	+21	3	Final Eight	19–21	—	34–11
3	(Bosnia and Herzegovina) VK Banja Luka	2	0	0	0	2	13	61	−48	0		2–27	—	—

Source: European Aquatics Challenger Cup
(H) Host

13 February 2026; 20:00	Report	AVK Branik Maribor (Slovenia)	34–11	(Bosnia and Herzegovina) VK Banja Luka	Pristan Pool, Maribor; Referees: Jarkko Virtanen (FIN), Georgios Lampros Kravaritis (GRE)
13 February 2026; 20:00	Report	Score by quarters: 10–4, 7–2, 9–3, 8–2			Pristan Pool, Maribor; Referees: Jarkko Virtanen (FIN), Georgios Lampros Kravaritis (GRE)
13 February 2026; 20:00	Report	Hadžić, Kačič 5	Goals	Cosic 4	Pristan Pool, Maribor; Referees: Jarkko Virtanen (FIN), Georgios Lampros Kravaritis (GRE)

14 February 2026; 19:00	Report	VK Banja Luka (Bosnia and Herzegovina)	2–27	(Malta) San Giljan ASC	Pristan Pool, Maribor; Referees: Povilas Sriubas (LTU), Jarkko Virtanen (FIN)
14 February 2026; 19:00	Report	Score by quarters: 0–6, 2–7, 0–7, 0–7			Pristan Pool, Maribor; Referees: Povilas Sriubas (LTU), Jarkko Virtanen (FIN)
14 February 2026; 19:00	Report	Djukic, Kojcinovic 1	Goals	Caruana 5	Pristan Pool, Maribor; Referees: Povilas Sriubas (LTU), Jarkko Virtanen (FIN)

15 February 2026; 12:00	Report	AVK Branik Maribor (Slovenia)	19–21	(Malta) San Giljan ASC	Pristan Pool, Maribor; Referees: Georgios Lampros Kravaritis (GRE), Povilas Sriubas (LTU)
15 February 2026; 12:00	Report	Score by quarters: 4–3, 4–6, 7–8, 4–4			Pristan Pool, Maribor; Referees: Georgios Lampros Kravaritis (GRE), Povilas Sriubas (LTU)
15 February 2026; 12:00	Report	Pevec 5	Goals	Plumpton 6	Pristan Pool, Maribor; Referees: Georgios Lampros Kravaritis (GRE), Povilas Sriubas (LTU)

=== Group C ===
13–15 February 2026, Istanbul, Turkey.

Pos	Team	Pld	W	PSW	PSL	L	GF	GA	GD	Pts	Qualification	ENK	GAL	CAR
1	(Turkey) Enka Sport Club	2	2	0	0	0	35	21	+14	6	Final Eight	—	—	20–7
2	(Turkey) Galatasaray SK (H)	2	1	0	0	1	42	19	+23	3	Final Eight	14–15	—	28–4
3	(Switzerland) Carouge Natation	2	0	0	0	2	11	48	−37	0		—	—	—

Source: European Aquatics Challenger Cup
(H) Host

13 February 2026; 20:00	Report	Enka Sport Club (Turkey)	20–7	(Switzerland) Carouge Natation	Galatasaray Kalamış Facilities, Istanbul; Referees: Alex De Raffaele (MLT), Tevz Suhadolnik (SLO)
13 February 2026; 20:00	Report	Score by quarters: 4–3, 5–1, 4–2, 7–1			Galatasaray Kalamış Facilities, Istanbul; Referees: Alex De Raffaele (MLT), Tevz Suhadolnik (SLO)
13 February 2026; 20:00	Report	Duzenli 6	Goals	Maddern 3	Galatasaray Kalamış Facilities, Istanbul; Referees: Alex De Raffaele (MLT), Tevz Suhadolnik (SLO)

14 February 2026; 19:00	Report	Galatasaray SK (Turkey)	28–4	(Switzerland) Carouge Natation	Galatasaray Kalamış Facilities, Istanbul; Referees: Tevz Suhadolnik (SLO), Luis Santos (POR)
14 February 2026; 19:00	Report	Score by quarters: 6–0, 8–1, 8–1, 6–2			Galatasaray Kalamış Facilities, Istanbul; Referees: Tevz Suhadolnik (SLO), Luis Santos (POR)
14 February 2026; 19:00	Report	Colak 5	Goals	Ardisson 2	Galatasaray Kalamış Facilities, Istanbul; Referees: Tevz Suhadolnik (SLO), Luis Santos (POR)

15 February 2026; 12:00	Report	Galatasaray SK (Turkey)	14–15	(Turkey) Enka Sport Club	Galatasaray Kalamış Facilities, Istanbul; Referees: Luis Santos (POR), Alex De Raffaele (MLT)
15 February 2026; 12:00	Report	Score by quarters: 5–7, 5–2, 1–4, 3–2			Galatasaray Kalamış Facilities, Istanbul; Referees: Luis Santos (POR), Alex De Raffaele (MLT)
15 February 2026; 12:00	Report	Caner 5	Goals	Dervisis 5	Galatasaray Kalamış Facilities, Istanbul; Referees: Luis Santos (POR), Alex De Raffaele (MLT)

=== Group D ===
13–15 February 2026, Maribor, Slovenia.

Pos	Team	Pld	W	PSW	PSL	L	GF	GA	GD	Pts	Qualification	VIT	HEY	MOU
1	(Portugal) Vitória SC	2	2	0	0	0	29	26	+3	6	Final Eight	—	—	18–17
2	(Turkey) Heybeliada ASC	2	0	1	0	1	25	27	−2	2	Final Eight	9–11	—	—
3	(Belgium) RD Mouscronnois	2	0	0	1	1	33	34	−1	1		—	20–21 (Note: Match ended 16–16. Heybeliada ASC won 4–5 on penalties.)	—

Source: European Aquatics Challenger Cup

13 February 2026; 18:00	Report	Vitória SC (Portugal)	18–17	(Belgium) RD Mouscronnois	Pristan Pool, Maribor; Referees: Povilas Sriubas (LTU), Luis Munoz Perez (ESP)
13 February 2026; 18:00	Report	Score by quarters: 5–4, 4–2, 3–7, 6–4			Pristan Pool, Maribor; Referees: Povilas Sriubas (LTU), Luis Munoz Perez (ESP)
13 February 2026; 18:00	Report	Radosavljević 4	Goals	Canonne 7	Pristan Pool, Maribor; Referees: Povilas Sriubas (LTU), Luis Munoz Perez (ESP)

14 February 2026; 17:00	Report	Heybeliada ASC (Turkey)	9–11	(Portugal) Vitória SC	Pristan Pool, Maribor; Referees: Luis Munoz Perez (ESP), Georgios Lampros Kravaritis (GRE)
14 February 2026; 17:00	Report	Score by quarters: 3–3, 1–2, 5–4, 0–2			Pristan Pool, Maribor; Referees: Luis Munoz Perez (ESP), Georgios Lampros Kravaritis (GRE)
14 February 2026; 17:00	Report	Sönmez 3	Goals	Ramos 4	Pristan Pool, Maribor; Referees: Luis Munoz Perez (ESP), Georgios Lampros Kravaritis (GRE)

14 February 2026; 10:00	Report	RD Mouscronnois (Belgium)	20–21 (PSO)	(Turkey) Heybeliada ASC	Pristan Pool, Maribor; Referees: Luis Munoz Perez (ESP), Jarkko Virtanen (FIN)
14 February 2026; 10:00	Report	Score by quarters: 3–2, 3–4, 7–6, 3–4 PSO: 4–5			Pristan Pool, Maribor; Referees: Luis Munoz Perez (ESP), Jarkko Virtanen (FIN)
14 February 2026; 10:00	Report	Canonne, Labreg 4	Goals	Sönmez 5	Pristan Pool, Maribor; Referees: Luis Munoz Perez (ESP), Jarkko Virtanen (FIN)

== See also ==
- 2025–26 European Aquatics Champions League
- 2025–26 European Aquatics Euro Cup
- 2025–26 European Aquatics Conference Cup
- 2025–26 European Aquatics Challenger Cup
- 2025 European Aquatics Super Cup
- 2025–26 European Aquatics Women's Champions League
- 2025–26 European Aquatics Women's Euro Cup
- 2025–26 European Aquatics Women's Conference Cup
- 2025–26 European Aquatics Women's Challenger Cup
- 2025 European Aquatics Women's Super Cup

Reference
Matchday 1
Matchday 2
Matchday 3
