= 2025–26 European Aquatics Challenger Cup Final Eight =

Tournament information
- Sport: Water polo
- Date: 12–15 March 2026
- Host: (Turkey) Istanbul
- Teams: 8 (from 6 countries)
- Website: Official website

Final positions
- Champion: (Turkey) Galatasaray SK
- Runner-up: (Lithuania) EVK Zaibas

Tournament statistics
- Matches played: 18

The 2025–26 European Aquatics Challenger Cup Final Eight is played between 12 and 15 March 2026 to determine the champions of the 2025–26 European Aquatics Challenger Cup. The Final Eight is being held by Enka Sport Club in Istanbul.

== Format ==
The 8 teams were placed into two groups of four. In each group, teams will play against each other once in a round-robin format. The top two in each group advance to the semifinals.

Teams are ranked according to points (3 points for a win, 2 points for a penalty shootout win, 1 point for a penalty shootout loss, 0 points for a loss), and if tied on points, the following tiebreaking criteria are applied, in the order given, to determine the rankings:

- Points in head-to-head matches among tied teams;
- Goal difference in head-to-head matches among tied teams;
- Goals scored in head-to-head matches among tied teams;
- Goal difference in all group matches;
- Goals scored in all group matches.

== Draw ==
External videos
- 2025–26 European Aquatics Challenger Cup Final Eight – Draw
- Draw

The draw was on 16 February 2026 in Zagreb, Croatia. The draw started with, in order, pots 1 and 2 being drawn. The position for the team within the group would then be drawn (for the purpose of the schedule).

=== Seeding ===
The pots were decided by as follows:

- Pot 1 consisted of the group winners of the Challenger Cup qualification round II
- Pot 2 consisted of the group runners-up of the Challenger Cup qualification round II.

Pot 1
Team
(Malta) Sliema ASC Nexawin
(Malta) San Giljan ASC
(Turkey) Enka Sport Club (H)
(Portugal) Vitória SC

Pot 2
Team
(Lithuania) EVK Zaibas
(Slovenia) AVK Branik Maribor
(Turkey) Galatasaray SK
(Turkey) Heybeliada ASC

=== Draw results ===
Group A
| Pos | Team |
|---|---|
| A1 | (Turkey) Enka Sport Club (H) |
| A2 | (Slovenia) AVK Branik Maribor |
| A3 | (Lithuania) EVK Zaibas |
| A4 | (Portugal) Vitória SC |

Group B
| Pos | Team |
|---|---|
| B1 | (Malta) Sliema ASC Nexawin |
| B2 | (Turkey) Galatasaray SK |
| B3 | (Turkey) Heybeliada ASC |
| B4 | (Malta) San Giljan ASC |

== Groups ==
=== Group A ===
| Pos | Team | Pld | W | PSW | PSL | L | GF | GA | GD | Pts | Qualification | ZAI | ENK | MAR | VIT |
|---|---|---|---|---|---|---|---|---|---|---|---|---|---|---|---|
| 1 | (Lithuania) EVK Zaibas | 3 | 3 | 0 | 0 | 0 | 47 | 34 | +13 | 9 | Semi-finals | — | — | — | 16–14 |
| 2 | (Turkey) Enka Sport Club (H) | 3 | 2 | 0 | 0 | 1 | 49 | 38 | +11 | 6 | Semi-finals | 11–16 | — | 21–13 | 17–9 |
| 3 | (Slovenia) AVK Branik Maribor | 3 | 1 | 0 | 0 | 2 | 40 | 52 | −12 | 3 | 5th place match | 9–15 | — | — | — |
| 4 | (Portugal) Vitória SC | 3 | 0 | 0 | 0 | 3 | 39 | 51 | −12 | 0 | 7th place match | — | — | 16–18 | — |

Source: European Aquatics Challenger Cup
(H) Host

| 12 March 2026; 13:00 | Report | Enka Sport Club (Turkey) | 17–9 | (Portugal) Vitória SC | Enka Sport Club Pool, Istanbul; Referees: Lukasz Krol (POL), Peter Radic (SVK) |
| 12 March 2026; 13:00 | Report | Score by quarters: 2–3, 4–2, 4–3, 7–1 | | | Enka Sport Club Pool, Istanbul; Referees: Lukasz Krol (POL), Peter Radic (SVK) |
| 12 March 2026; 13:00 | Report | Duzenli 6 | Goals | four players 2 | Enka Sport Club Pool, Istanbul; Referees: Lukasz Krol (POL), Peter Radic (SVK) |

| 12 March 2026; 15:30 | Report | AVK Branik Maribor (Slovenia) | 9–15 | (Lithuania) EVK Zaibas | Enka Sport Club Pool, Istanbul; Referees: Andreja Stanojevic (SRB), Jakub Necas (CZE) |
| 12 March 2026; 15:30 | Report | Score by quarters: 3–4, 1–4, 5–4, 0–3 | | | Enka Sport Club Pool, Istanbul; Referees: Andreja Stanojevic (SRB), Jakub Necas (CZE) |
| 12 March 2026; 15:30 | Report | Kačič 3 | Goals | Vrdoljak 3 | Enka Sport Club Pool, Istanbul; Referees: Andreja Stanojevic (SRB), Jakub Necas (CZE) |

| 13 March 2026; 08:45 | Report | Enka Sport Club (Turkey) | 11–16 | (Lithuania) EVK Zaibas | Enka Sport Club Pool, Istanbul; Referees: Ruben Garcia (SUI), Roeland Sonnemans (NED) |
| 13 March 2026; 08:45 | Report | Score by quarters: 2–5, 3–6, 2–3, 4–2 | | | Enka Sport Club Pool, Istanbul; Referees: Ruben Garcia (SUI), Roeland Sonnemans (NED) |
| 13 March 2026; 08:45 | Report | Dervisis 7 | Goals | Vrdoljak 6 | Enka Sport Club Pool, Istanbul; Referees: Ruben Garcia (SUI), Roeland Sonnemans (NED) |

| 13 March 2026; 10:30 | Report | Vitória SC (Portugal) | 16–18 | (Slovenia) AVK Branik Maribor | Enka Sport Club Pool, Istanbul; Referees: Vlaho Radicevic (CRO), Manuel Manea (ROU) |
| 13 March 2026; 10:30 | Report | Score by quarters: 4–5, 5–5, 4–3, 3–5 | | | Enka Sport Club Pool, Istanbul; Referees: Vlaho Radicevic (CRO), Manuel Manea (ROU) |
| 13 March 2026; 10:30 | Report | Ramos 5 | Goals | Brcic, Pevec 4 | Enka Sport Club Pool, Istanbul; Referees: Vlaho Radicevic (CRO), Manuel Manea (ROU) |

| 13 March 2026; 16:45 | Report | Enka Sport Club (Turkey) | 21–13 | (Slovenia) AVK Branik Maribor | Enka Sport Club Pool, Istanbul; Referees: Andreja Stanojevic (SRB), Vlaho Radicevic (CRO) |
| 13 March 2026; 16:45 | Report | Score by quarters: 4–1, 7–4, 3–6, 7–2 | | | Enka Sport Club Pool, Istanbul; Referees: Andreja Stanojevic (SRB), Vlaho Radicevic (CRO) |
| 13 March 2026; 16:45 | Report | Dervisis, Duzenli 7 | Goals | Pevec 4 | Enka Sport Club Pool, Istanbul; Referees: Andreja Stanojevic (SRB), Vlaho Radicevic (CRO) |

| 13 March 2026; 18:30 | Report | EVK Zaibas (Lithuania) | 16–14 | (Portugal) Vitória SC | Enka Sport Club Pool, Istanbul; Referees: Jakub Necas (CZE), Lukasz Krol (POL) |
| 13 March 2026; 18:30 | Report | Score by quarters: 2–3, 5–4, 4–2, 5–5 | | | Enka Sport Club Pool, Istanbul; Referees: Jakub Necas (CZE), Lukasz Krol (POL) |
| 13 March 2026; 18:30 | Report | Andrejaitis, Petrovski 3 | Goals | Ferreira, Lopes 3 | Enka Sport Club Pool, Istanbul; Referees: Jakub Necas (CZE), Lukasz Krol (POL) |

=== Group B ===
| Pos | Team | Pld | W | PSW | PSL | L | GF | GA | GD | Pts | Qualification | GAL | SLI | GIL | HEY |
|---|---|---|---|---|---|---|---|---|---|---|---|---|---|---|---|
| 1 | (Turkey) Galatasaray SK | 3 | 3 | 0 | 0 | 0 | 55 | 25 | +30 | 9 | Semi-finals | — | — | — | 18–7 |
| 2 | (Malta) Sliema ASC Nexawin | 3 | 2 | 0 | 0 | 1 | 46 | 49 | −3 | 6 | Semi-finals | 5–23 | — | 16–15 | 25–11 |
| 3 | (Malta) San Giljan ASC | 3 | 1 | 0 | 0 | 2 | 50 | 46 | +4 | 3 | 5th place match | 13–14 | — | — | — |
| 4 | (Turkey) Heybeliada ASC | 3 | 0 | 0 | 0 | 3 | 34 | 65 | −31 | 0 | 7th place match | — | — | 16–22 | — |

Source: European Aquatics Challenger Cup

| 12 March 2026; 18:00 | Report | Sliema ASC Nexawin (Malta) | 16–15 | (Malta) San Giljan ASC | Enka Sport Club Pool, Istanbul; Referees: Vlaho Radicevic (CRO), Ruben Garcia (SUI) |
| 12 March 2026; 18:00 | Report | Score by quarters: 5–4, 2–4, 5–2, 4–5 | | | Enka Sport Club Pool, Istanbul; Referees: Vlaho Radicevic (CRO), Ruben Garcia (SUI) |
| 12 March 2026; 18:00 | Report | Galea, Gitto 3 | Goals | Vavic 7 | Enka Sport Club Pool, Istanbul; Referees: Vlaho Radicevic (CRO), Ruben Garcia (SUI) |

| 12 March 2026; 20:30 | Report | Galatasaray SK (Turkey) | 18–7 | (Turkey) Heybeliada ASC | Enka Sport Club Pool, Istanbul; Referees: Roeland Sonnemans (NED), Manuel Manea (ROU) |
| 12 March 2026; 20:30 | Report | Score by quarters: 6–2, 3–5, 3–0, 6–0 | | | Enka Sport Club Pool, Istanbul; Referees: Roeland Sonnemans (NED), Manuel Manea (ROU) |
| 12 March 2026; 20:30 | Report | Erdağ 4 | Goals | Demirel 3 | Enka Sport Club Pool, Istanbul; Referees: Roeland Sonnemans (NED), Manuel Manea (ROU) |

| 13 March 2026; 12:15 | Report | Sliema ASC Nexawin (Malta) | 25–11 | (Turkey) Heybeliada ASC | Enka Sport Club Pool, Istanbul; Referees: Andreja Stanojevic (SRB), Lukasz Krol (POL) |
| 13 March 2026; 12:15 | Report | Score by quarters: 8–2, 6–0, 5–3, 6–6 | | | Enka Sport Club Pool, Istanbul; Referees: Andreja Stanojevic (SRB), Lukasz Krol (POL) |
| 13 March 2026; 12:15 | Report | Cachia 5 | Goals | Gedik 3 | Enka Sport Club Pool, Istanbul; Referees: Andreja Stanojevic (SRB), Lukasz Krol (POL) |

| 13 March 2026; 14:00 | Report | San Giljan ASC (Malta) | 13–14 | (Turkey) Galatasaray SK | Enka Sport Club Pool, Istanbul; Referees: Jakub Necas (CZE), Peter Radic (SVK) |
| 13 March 2026; 14:00 | Report | Score by quarters: 5–1, 3–5, 2–2, 3–6 | | | Enka Sport Club Pool, Istanbul; Referees: Jakub Necas (CZE), Peter Radic (SVK) |
| 13 March 2026; 14:00 | Report | Vavic 7 | Goals | Gak 3 | Enka Sport Club Pool, Istanbul; Referees: Jakub Necas (CZE), Peter Radic (SVK) |

| 13 March 2026; 20:15 | Report | Sliema ASC Nexawin (Malta) | 5–23 | (Turkey) Galatasaray SK | Enka Sport Club Pool, Istanbul; Referees: Roeland Sonnemans (NED), Peter Radic (SVK) |
| 13 March 2026; 20:15 | Report | Score by quarters: 3–4, 0–6, 2–6, 0–7 | | | Enka Sport Club Pool, Istanbul; Referees: Roeland Sonnemans (NED), Peter Radic (SVK) |
| 13 March 2026; 20:15 | Report | Cachia, Zammit 2 | Goals | Gak 3 | Enka Sport Club Pool, Istanbul; Referees: Roeland Sonnemans (NED), Peter Radic (SVK) |

| 13 March 2026; 22:00 | Report | Heybeliada ASC (Turkey) | 16–22 | (Malta) San Giljan ASC | Enka Sport Club Pool, Istanbul; Referees: Manuel Manea (ROU), Ruben Garcia (SUI) |
| 13 March 2026; 22:00 | Report | Score by quarters: 3–8, 5–3, 5–5, 3–6 | | | Enka Sport Club Pool, Istanbul; Referees: Manuel Manea (ROU), Ruben Garcia (SUI) |
| 13 March 2026; 22:00 | Report | Sonmez 6 | Goals | Plumpton 6 | Enka Sport Club Pool, Istanbul; Referees: Manuel Manea (ROU), Ruben Garcia (SUI) |

== Knockout stage ==
=== 7th place match ===
| 7th place match |
| 14 March |
| (Portugal) Vitória SC | 18 |
| (Turkey) Heybeliada ASC | 9 |

| 14 March 2026; 13:00 | Report | Vitória SC (Portugal) | 18–9 | (Turkey) Heybeliada ASC | Enka Sport Club Pool, Istanbul; Referees: Jakub Necas (CZE), Roeland Sonnemans (NED) |
| 14 March 2026; 13:00 | Report | Score by quarters: 6–4, 3–1, 3–3, 6–1 | | | Enka Sport Club Pool, Istanbul; Referees: Jakub Necas (CZE), Roeland Sonnemans (NED) |
| 14 March 2026; 13:00 | Report | Ramos 7 | Goals | Gulsoy, Sonmez 2 | Enka Sport Club Pool, Istanbul; Referees: Jakub Necas (CZE), Roeland Sonnemans (NED) |

=== 5th place match ===
| 5th place match |
| 14 March |
| (Slovenia) AVK Branik Maribor | 9 |
| (Malta) San Giljan ASC | 24 |

| 14 March 2026; 15:30 | Report | AVK Branik Maribor (Slovenia) | 9–24 | (Malta) San Giljan ASC | Enka Sport Club Pool, Istanbul; Referees: Andreja Stanojevic (SRB), Lukasz Krol (POL) |
| 14 March 2026; 15:30 | Report | Score by quarters: 4–6, 2–4, 1–7, 2–7 | | | Enka Sport Club Pool, Istanbul; Referees: Andreja Stanojevic (SRB), Lukasz Krol (POL) |
| 14 March 2026; 15:30 | Report | Bucalo 3 | Goals | Plumpton 6 | Enka Sport Club Pool, Istanbul; Referees: Andreja Stanojevic (SRB), Lukasz Krol (POL) |

=== Bracket ===
Semi-finals
(Lithuania) EVK Zaibas | 13 (5)
(Malta) Sliema ASC Nexawin | 13 (3)
(Turkey) Galatasaray SK | 20
(Turkey) Enka Sport Club | 9

Final
(Lithuania) EVK Zaibas | 11
(Turkey) Galatasaray SK | 13
Third place
(Malta) Sliema ASC Nexawin | 17
(Turkey) Enka Sport Club | 15

==== Semifinals ====
| 14 March 2026; 18:00 | Report | EVK Zaibas (Lithuania) | 18–16 (PSO) | (Malta) Sliema ASC Nexawin | Enka Sport Club Pool, Istanbul; Referees: Ruben Garcia (SUI), Peter Radic (SVK) |
| 14 March 2026; 18:00 | Report | Score by quarters: 2–1, 3–3, 2–6, 6–3 PSO: 5–3 | | | Enka Sport Club Pool, Istanbul; Referees: Ruben Garcia (SUI), Peter Radic (SVK) |
| 14 March 2026; 18:00 | Report | Jelača 7 | Goals | Ivović 6 | Enka Sport Club Pool, Istanbul; Referees: Ruben Garcia (SUI), Peter Radic (SVK) |

| 14 March 2026; 20:30 | Report | Galatasaray SK (Turkey) | 20–9 | (Turkey) Enka Sport Club | Enka Sport Club Pool, Istanbul; Referees: Manuel Manea (ROU), Vlaho Radicevic (CRO) |
| 14 March 2026; 20:30 | Report | Score by quarters: 5–3, 5–3, 5–2, 5–1 | | | Enka Sport Club Pool, Istanbul; Referees: Manuel Manea (ROU), Vlaho Radicevic (CRO) |
| 14 March 2026; 20:30 | Report | Naipoglu 6 | Goals | three players 2 | Enka Sport Club Pool, Istanbul; Referees: Manuel Manea (ROU), Vlaho Radicevic (CRO) |

==== Third place game ====
| 15 March 2026; 10:00 | Report | Sliema ASC Nexawin (Malta) | 17–15 | (Turkey) Enka Sport Club | Enka Sport Club Pool, Istanbul; Referees: Manuel Manea (ROU), Roeland Sonnemans (NED) |
| 15 March 2026; 10:00 | Report | Score by quarters: 4–6, 6–3, 5–3, 2–3 | | | Enka Sport Club Pool, Istanbul; Referees: Manuel Manea (ROU), Roeland Sonnemans (NED) |
| 15 March 2026; 10:00 | Report | Cachia 4 | Goals | Duzenli 4 | Enka Sport Club Pool, Istanbul; Referees: Manuel Manea (ROU), Roeland Sonnemans (NED) |

==== Final ====
| 15 March 2026; 12:30 | Report | EVK Zaibas (Lithuania) | 11–13 | (Turkey) Galatasaray SK | Enka Sport Club Pool, Istanbul; Referees: Andreja Stanojevic (SRB), Vlaho Radicevic (CRO) |
| 15 March 2026; 12:30 | Report | Score by quarters: 6–5, 2–4, 1–2, 2–2 | | | Enka Sport Club Pool, Istanbul; Referees: Andreja Stanojevic (SRB), Vlaho Radicevic (CRO) |
| 15 March 2026; 12:30 | Report | Jelača 4 | Goals | Gak 3 | Enka Sport Club Pool, Istanbul; Referees: Andreja Stanojevic (SRB), Vlaho Radicevic (CRO) |

== See also ==
- 2025–26 European Aquatics Champions League
- 2025–26 European Aquatics Euro Cup
- 2025–26 European Aquatics Conference Cup
- 2025–26 European Aquatics Challenger Cup
- 2025 European Aquatics Super Cup
- 2025–26 European Aquatics Women's Champions League
- 2025–26 European Aquatics Women's Euro Cup
- 2025–26 European Aquatics Women's Conference Cup
- 2025–26 European Aquatics Women's Challenger Cup
- 2025 European Aquatics Women's Super Cup

Reference
Matchday 1
Matchday 2
Matchday 3
Matchday 4
