= 2025–26 European Aquatics Challenger Cup qualification round I =

- 2025–26

Tournament information
- Sport: Water polo
- Date: 28–30 November 2025
- Host(s): (Malta) Valletta (Slovenia) Maribor (Turkey) Istanbul (Belgium) Mouscron
- Teams: 14 (from 10 countries)
- Website: Official website

Tournament statistics
- Matches played: 18

The 2025–26 European Aquatics Challenger Cup qualification round I is played between 28 and 30 November 2025 to determine the 8 teams advancing to the qualification round II of the 2025–26 European Aquatics Challenger Cup.

== Format ==
The 14 teams were place into four groups in total, two with four teams and two teams with three. In each group, teams will play against each other once in a round-robin format. The top two in each group advance to the next round.

Teams are ranked according to points (3 points for a win, 2 points for a penalty shootout win, 1 point for a penalty shootout loss, 0 points for a loss), and if tied on points, the following tiebreaking criteria are applied, in the order given, to determine the rankings:

- Points in head-to-head matches among tied teams;
- Goal difference in head-to-head matches among tied teams;
- Goals scored in head-to-head matches among tied teams;
- Goal difference in all group matches;
- Goals scored in all group matches.

== Group composition ==
External videos
- 2025–26 European Aquatics Challenger Cup qualification round I – Draw
- Draw

There was no draw, rather the groups were pre-selected for geographical reasons on 11 August 2025 in Zagreb, Croatia. (H) indicates which clubs is hosting a group.

Key to colours
Teams advancing to qualification round II

Group A
Team	Rank	Points
(Malta) Sliema ASC (H)	98	126
(Cyprus) APOEL Nicosia	66	940
(Israel) Hapoel Palram Zvulun	68	860
(Malta) San Giljan ASC	N/A	

Group B
Team	Rank	Points
(Slovenia) AVK Branik Maribor (H)	N/A	
(Switzerland) Carouge Natation	44	2,625
(Slovenia) VK Ljubljana Slovan	61	1,310
(Portugal) Club Naval Povoense	N/A	

Group C
Team	Rank	Points
(Turkey) Enka Sport Club (H)	45	2,507.5
(United Kingdom) Welsh Wanderers	85	560
(Turkey) Heybeliada ASC	N/A	

Group D
Team	Rank	Points
(Belgium) Royal Dauphins Mouscronnois (H)	48	2,170
(Finland) Cetus Espoo	58	1,420
(United Kingdom) West London Penguin	N/A	

== Groups ==
=== Group A ===
28–30 November 2025, Valletta, Malta.

Pos	Team	Pld	W	PSW	PSL	L	GF	GA	GD	Pts	Qualification	SLI	GIL	HAP	APO
1	(Malta) Sliema ASC (H)	3	3	0	0	0	65	35	+30	9	Qualification round II	—	—	18–13	28–9
2	(Malta) San Giljan ASC	3	2	0	0	1	53	39	+14	6	Qualification round II	13–19	—	—	—
3	(Israel) Hapoel Palram Zvulun	3	1	0	0	2	40	44	−4	3		—	10–14	—	17–12
4	(Cyprus) APOEL Nicosia	3	0	0	0	3	31	71	−40	0		—	—	10–26	—

Source: European Aquatics Challenger Cup
(H) Host

28 November 2025; 18:30	Report	Sliema ASC (Malta)	18–13	(Israel) Hapoel Palram Zvulun	Cottonera Sports Complex, Cottonera; Referees: Robert Prelovsky (SVK), Roberto Guarnieri (BEL)
28 November 2025; 18:30	Report	Score by quarters: 5–2, 3–5, 6–4, 4–2			Cottonera Sports Complex, Cottonera; Referees: Robert Prelovsky (SVK), Roberto Guarnieri (BEL)
28 November 2025; 18:30	Report	D. Zammit 6	Goals	three players 3	Cottonera Sports Complex, Cottonera; Referees: Robert Prelovsky (SVK), Roberto Guarnieri (BEL)

28 November 2025; 20:00	Report	APOEL Nicosia (Cyprus)	10–26	(Malta) San Giljan ASC	Cottonera Sports Complex, Cottonera; Referees: Rok Vehovec (SLO), Luis Alves (POR)
28 November 2025; 20:00	Report	Score by quarters: 3–7, 2–7, 3–5, 2–7			Cottonera Sports Complex, Cottonera; Referees: Rok Vehovec (SLO), Luis Alves (POR)
28 November 2025; 20:00	Report	Nikolaou, Varga 2	Goals	Vavic, N. Zammit 5	Cottonera Sports Complex, Cottonera; Referees: Rok Vehovec (SLO), Luis Alves (POR)

29 November 2025; 16:30	Report	Hapoel Palram Zvulun (Israel)	17–12	(Cyprus) APOEL Nicosia	Cottonera Sports Complex, Cottonera; Referees: Roberto Guarnieri (BEL), Rok Vehovec (SLO)
29 November 2025; 16:30	Report	Score by quarters: 6–3, 6–0, 4–5, 1–4			Cottonera Sports Complex, Cottonera; Referees: Roberto Guarnieri (BEL), Rok Vehovec (SLO)
29 November 2025; 16:30	Report	Gros 5	Goals	Varga 7	Cottonera Sports Complex, Cottonera; Referees: Roberto Guarnieri (BEL), Rok Vehovec (SLO)

29 November 2025; 17:45	Report	San Giljan ASC (Malta)	13–19	(Malta) Sliema ASC	Cottonera Sports Complex, Cottonera; Referees: Luis Alves (POR), Robert Prelovsky (SVK)
29 November 2025; 17:45	Report	Score by quarters: 3–7, 4–5, 3–3, 3–4			Cottonera Sports Complex, Cottonera; Referees: Luis Alves (POR), Robert Prelovsky (SVK)
29 November 2025; 17:45	Report	N. Zammit 3	Goals	Engerer 6	Cottonera Sports Complex, Cottonera; Referees: Luis Alves (POR), Robert Prelovsky (SVK)

30 November 2025; 09:00	Report	Hapoel Palram Zvulun (Israel)	10–14	(Malta) San Giljan ASC	Cottonera Sports Complex, Cottonera; Referees: Rok Vehovec (SLO), Robert Prelovsky (SVK)
30 November 2025; 09:00	Report	Score by quarters: 3–4, 3–3, 3–5, 1–2			Cottonera Sports Complex, Cottonera; Referees: Rok Vehovec (SLO), Robert Prelovsky (SVK)
30 November 2025; 09:00	Report	Gros, Klarfeld 2	Goals	D. Zammit, N. Zammit 3	Cottonera Sports Complex, Cottonera; Referees: Rok Vehovec (SLO), Robert Prelovsky (SVK)

30 November 2025; 10:30	Report	Sliema ASC (Malta)	28–9	(Cyprus) APOEL Nicosia	Cottonera Sports Complex, Cottonera; Referees: Luis Alves (POR), Roberto Guarnieri (BEL)
30 November 2025; 10:30	Report	Score by quarters: 5–2, 8–2, 7–3, 8–2			Cottonera Sports Complex, Cottonera; Referees: Luis Alves (POR), Roberto Guarnieri (BEL)
30 November 2025; 10:30	Report	Cassar, Schembri 5	Goals	Baglatzis 3	Cottonera Sports Complex, Cottonera; Referees: Luis Alves (POR), Roberto Guarnieri (BEL)

=== Group B ===
28–30 November 2025, Maribor, Slovenia.

Pos	Team	Pld	W	PSW	PSL	L	GF	GA	GD	Pts	Qualification	MAR	CAR	SLO	NAV
1	(Slovenia) AVK Branik Maribor (H)	3	3	0	0	0	58	31	+27	9	Qualification round II	—	20–13	17–12	21–6
2	(Switzerland) Carouge Natation	3	2	0	0	1	44	40	+4	6	Qualification round II	—	—	—	—
3	(Slovenia) VK Ljubljana Slovan	3	1	0	0	2	38	42	−4	3		—	9–13	—	17–12
4	(Portugal) Club Naval Povoense	3	0	0	0	3	29	56	−27	0		—	11–18	—	—

Source: European Aquatics Challenger Cup
(H) Host

28 November 2025; 18:00	Report	VK Ljubljana Slovan (Slovenia)	9–13	(Switzerland) Carouge Natation	Pristan Pool, Maribor; Referees: Bozo Duraskovic (MNE), Georg Schoen (AUT)
28 November 2025; 18:00	Report	Score by quarters: 3–2, 2–5, 2–4, 2–2			Pristan Pool, Maribor; Referees: Bozo Duraskovic (MNE), Georg Schoen (AUT)
28 November 2025; 18:00	Report	Potocnik 5	Goals	Blary, Roscio 4	Pristan Pool, Maribor; Referees: Bozo Duraskovic (MNE), Georg Schoen (AUT)

28 November 2025; 12:00	Report	AVK Branik Maribor (Slovenia)	20–13	(Portugal) Club Naval Povoense	Pristan Pool, Maribor; Referees: Erkan Turkkan (TUR), Alex De Raffaele (MLT)
28 November 2025; 12:00	Report	Score by quarters: 5–0, 7–3, 4–1, 5–2			Pristan Pool, Maribor; Referees: Erkan Turkkan (TUR), Alex De Raffaele (MLT)
28 November 2025; 12:00	Report	three players 3	Goals	Rodrigues Magalhaes 3	Pristan Pool, Maribor; Referees: Erkan Turkkan (TUR), Alex De Raffaele (MLT)

29 November 2025; 17:00	Report	Club Naval Povoense (Portugal)	11–18	(Switzerland) Carouge Natation	Pristan Pool, Maribor; Referees: Bozo Duraskovic (MNE), Alex De Raffaele (MLT)
29 November 2025; 17:00	Report	Score by quarters: 1–3, 2–5, 4–4, 4–6			Pristan Pool, Maribor; Referees: Bozo Duraskovic (MNE), Alex De Raffaele (MLT)
29 November 2025; 17:00	Report	four players 2	Goals	Roscio 6	Pristan Pool, Maribor; Referees: Bozo Duraskovic (MNE), Alex De Raffaele (MLT)

29 November 2025; 19:00	Report	AVK Branik Maribor (Slovenia)	17–12	(Slovenia) VK Ljubljana Slovan	Pristan Pool, Maribor; Referees: Erkan Turkkan (TUR), Georg Schoen (AUT)
29 November 2025; 19:00	Report	Score by quarters: 6–3, 3–4, 3–4, 5–1			Pristan Pool, Maribor; Referees: Erkan Turkkan (TUR), Georg Schoen (AUT)
29 November 2025; 19:00	Report	Miletic, Seljak 3	Goals	Cetkovic 4	Pristan Pool, Maribor; Referees: Erkan Turkkan (TUR), Georg Schoen (AUT)

30 November 2025; 10:00	Report	VK Ljubljana Slovan (Slovenia)	17–12	(Portugal) Club Naval Povoense	Pristan Pool, Maribor; Referees: Alex De Raffaele (MLT), Georg Schoen (AUT)
30 November 2025; 10:00	Report	Score by quarters: 3–2, 7–2, 4–3, 3–5			Pristan Pool, Maribor; Referees: Alex De Raffaele (MLT), Georg Schoen (AUT)
30 November 2025; 10:00	Report	Lipnik, Potocnik 5	Goals	Jose Ferreira 5	Pristan Pool, Maribor; Referees: Alex De Raffaele (MLT), Georg Schoen (AUT)

30 November 2025; 12:00	Report	AVK Branik Maribor (Slovenia)	20–13	(Switzerland) Carouge Natation	Pristan Pool, Maribor; Referees: Bozo Duraskovic (MNE), Erkan Turkkan (TUR)
30 November 2025; 12:00	Report	Score by quarters: 5–4, 3–1, 6–4, 6–4			Pristan Pool, Maribor; Referees: Bozo Duraskovic (MNE), Erkan Turkkan (TUR)
30 November 2025; 12:00	Report	Seljak, Troppan 4	Goals	Roscio 5	Pristan Pool, Maribor; Referees: Bozo Duraskovic (MNE), Erkan Turkkan (TUR)

=== Group C ===
28–30 November 2025, Istanbul, Turkey.

Pos	Team	Pld	W	PSW	PSL	L	GF	GA	GD	Pts	Qualification	ENKA	HEY	WEL
1	(Turkey) Enka Sport Club (H)	2	2	0	0	0	52	17	+35	6	Qualification round II	—	21–7	31–10
2	(Turkey) Heybeliada ASC	2	1	0	0	1	29	33	−4	3	Qualification round II	—	—	—
3	(United Kingdom) Welsh Wanderers	2	0	0	0	2	22	53	−31	0		—	12–22	—

Source: European Aquatics Challenger Cup
(H) Host

28 November 2025; 12:00	Report	Enka Sport Club (Turkey)	21–7	(Turkey) Heybeliada ASC	Enka Sport Club Pool, Istanbul; Referees: Jarkko Virtanen (FIN), Georgios Polychronopoulos (GRE)
28 November 2025; 12:00	Report	Score by quarters: 7–1, 5–1, 5–2, 4–3			Enka Sport Club Pool, Istanbul; Referees: Jarkko Virtanen (FIN), Georgios Polychronopoulos (GRE)
28 November 2025; 12:00	Report	Alkan 5	Goals	Gulsoy, Sonmez 2	Enka Sport Club Pool, Istanbul; Referees: Jarkko Virtanen (FIN), Georgios Polychronopoulos (GRE)

29 November 2025; 12:00	Report	Enka Sport Club (Turkey)	31–10	(United Kingdom) Welsh Wanderers	Enka Sport Club Pool, Istanbul; Referees: Jarkko Virtanen (FIN), Tobias Laufer (GER)
29 November 2025; 12:00	Report	Score by quarters: 8–3, 8–2, 8–1, 7–4			Enka Sport Club Pool, Istanbul; Referees: Jarkko Virtanen (FIN), Tobias Laufer (GER)
29 November 2025; 12:00	Report	Kahraman 7	Goals	Jenkins Delf, Laxton 3	Enka Sport Club Pool, Istanbul; Referees: Jarkko Virtanen (FIN), Tobias Laufer (GER)

30 November 2025; 12:00	Report	Welsh Wanderers (United Kingdom)	12–22	(Turkey) Heybeliada ASC	Enka Sport Club Pool, Istanbul; Referees: Tobias Laufer (GER), Georgios Polychronopoulos (GRE)
30 November 2025; 12:00	Report	Score by quarters: 4–4, 1–6, 6–4, 1–8			Enka Sport Club Pool, Istanbul; Referees: Tobias Laufer (GER), Georgios Polychronopoulos (GRE)
30 November 2025; 12:00	Report	Laxton 5	Goals	Sonmez 10	Enka Sport Club Pool, Istanbul; Referees: Tobias Laufer (GER), Georgios Polychronopoulos (GRE)

=== Group D ===
28–30 November 2025, Mouscron, Belgium.

Pos	Team	Pld	W	PSW	PSL	L	GF	GA	GD	Pts	Qualification	MOU	CET	PEN
1	(Belgium) RD Mouscronnois (H)	2	2	0	0	0	39	26	+13	6	Qualification round II	—	15–12	24–14
2	(Finland) Cetus Espoo	2	1	0	0	1	24	24	0	3	Qualification round II	—	—	12–9
3	(United Kingdom) West London Penguin	2	0	0	0	2	23	36	−13	0		—	—	—

Source: European Aquatics Challenger Cup
(H) Host

28 November 2025; 20:30	Report	RD Mouscronnois (Belgium)	15–12	(Finland) Cetus Espoo	Les Dauphins Olympic Swimming Pool, Mouscron; Referees: Tal Shildan (ISR), Ioannis Soulos (CYP)
28 November 2025; 20:30	Report	Score by quarters: 2–3, 3–1, 6–5, 4–3			Les Dauphins Olympic Swimming Pool, Mouscron; Referees: Tal Shildan (ISR), Ioannis Soulos (CYP)
28 November 2025; 20:30	Report	Canonne 6	Goals	Vasic 7	Les Dauphins Olympic Swimming Pool, Mouscron; Referees: Tal Shildan (ISR), Ioannis Soulos (CYP)

29 November 2025; 20:30	Report	Cetus Espoo (Finland)	12–9	(United Kingdom) West London Penguin	Les Dauphins Olympic Swimming Pool, Mouscron; Referees: Roeland Sonnemans (NED), Tal Shildan (ISR)
29 November 2025; 20:30	Report	Score by quarters: 3–4, 1–3, 3–0, 5–2			Les Dauphins Olympic Swimming Pool, Mouscron; Referees: Roeland Sonnemans (NED), Tal Shildan (ISR)
29 November 2025; 20:30	Report	Lapins 3	Goals	Hughes 3	Les Dauphins Olympic Swimming Pool, Mouscron; Referees: Roeland Sonnemans (NED), Tal Shildan (ISR)

30 November 2025; 11:00	Report	RD Mouscronnois (Belgium)	24–14	(United Kingdom) West London Penguin	Les Dauphins Olympic Swimming Pool, Mouscron; Referees: Ioannis Soulos (CYP), Roeland Sonnemans (NED)
30 November 2025; 11:00	Report	Score by quarters: 5–1, 4–4, 8–4, 7–5			Les Dauphins Olympic Swimming Pool, Mouscron; Referees: Ioannis Soulos (CYP), Roeland Sonnemans (NED)
30 November 2025; 11:00	Report	Canonne 5	Goals	Kingsmill 4	Les Dauphins Olympic Swimming Pool, Mouscron; Referees: Ioannis Soulos (CYP), Roeland Sonnemans (NED)

== See also ==
- 2025–26 European Aquatics Champions League
- 2025–26 European Aquatics Euro Cup
- 2025–26 European Aquatics Conference Cup
- 2025–26 European Aquatics Challenger Cup
- 2025 European Aquatics Super Cup
- 2025–26 European Aquatics Women's Champions League
- 2025–26 European Aquatics Women's Euro Cup
- 2025–26 European Aquatics Women's Conference Cup
- 2025–26 European Aquatics Women's Challenger Cup
- 2025 European Aquatics Women's Super Cup

Reference
Matchday 1
Matchday 2
Matchday 3
