= 2025–26 European Aquatics Challenger Cup =

Water polo sports season

European Aquatics Challenger Cup
- 2025–26

Tournament information
- Sport: Water polo
- Date: Qualification Round I: 28–30 November 2025; Qualification Round II: 13–15 February 2026; Final classification: 13–15 February 2026; Final Eight: 12–15 March 2026
- Tournament format(s): Round Robin and Knockout stage
- Teams: Qualification round I: 14 (Note: From 10 countries); Qualification round II: 8+4; Final classification: 6 Final Eight: 8 Total: 14+4 (from 9 countries)
- Website: Official website

Final positions
- Champion: (Turkey) Galatasaray SK
- Runner-up: (Lithuania) EVK Zaibas

Tournament statistics
- Matches played: 69

The 2025–26 European Aquatics Challenger Cup is the 4th edition of the now quaternary water polo competition organised by European Aquatics.

Starting this season, it acts as the fourth tier, due to the introduction of the European Aquatics Conference Cup. The winners of the European Aquatics Challenger Cup automatically qualify for next season's Conference Cup (if they choose to enter).

GZC Donk are the defending champions but will not be defending their title after not entering this season.

Galatasaray SK won their second title after beating EVK Zaibas 13–11 in the final.

== Rankings ==
The results were based on the results of the past four seasons.

- Associations 13 and below can have six teams qualify.

Apart from the distribution based on the rankings, countries could have additional teams participating in the Challenger Cup, as noted below:

- (CC) – Additional teams dropping down from the Conference Cup

Rank	Association	Points	Teams	Notes
1	Italy	99,917.5	0	
2	Hungary	80,465	0	
3	Serbia	71,510	0	
4	Spain	69,187.5	0	
5	Greece	59,917.5	0	
6	Croatia	59,642.5	0	
7	France	41,195	0	
8	Germany	24,812.5	0	
9	Romania	23,817.5	0	
10	Montenegro	18,647.5	0	
11	(Georgia (country)) Georgia	10,292.5	0	
12	Netherlands	5,790	0	
13	Turkey	5,722.5	2	+1 (CC)
14	Portugal	5,292.5	1	+1 (EC)
15	Switzerland	4,245	1	

Rank	Association	Points	Teams	Notes
16	Slovenia	3,800	2	
17	Lithuania	3,677.5	0	+1 (EC)
18	Slovakia	3,555	0	
19	(United Kingdom) Great Britain	2,280	2	
20	Belgium	2,170	1	
21	Israel	1,850	1	
22	Cyprus	1,490	1	
23	Malta	1,472	2	
24	Finland	1,420	1	
25	Bosnia and Herzegovina	1,190	0	+1 (EC)
26	Russia	1,087.5	0	
27	Bulgaria	370	0	
28	Poland	317.5	0	
29	Denmark	280	0	

=== Ranking facts ===
Biggest rise
Pos	Team	Ori	New	Move
1	Cyprus	28	22	▲ +6
2	Portugal	17	14	▲ +3
2	Israel	24	21	▲ +3

Biggest fall
Pos	Team	Ori	New	Move
1	Russia	13	26	▼ –13
2	Bosnia and Herzegovina	20	25	▼ –5
3	Denmark	25	29	▼ –4

New entries
None

Leaving entries
None

== Teams ==
Six teams from countries ranked 13 and below are permitted to enter.

Everyone who enters starts in the qualification round I.

Unlike last season, in the event that a club decides not to enter, the next best ranked team is not allowed to take their place.

=== Qualified teams ===
The labels in the parentheses show how each team qualified for the place of its starting round:

- 1st, 2nd, 3rd, 4th, etc: League positions of the previous season
- CC: Transferred from the Conference Cup
  - QR: Transferred from the Conference Cup qualification round I

Entry round	Teams			
Qualification round II	(Turkey) Galatasaray SK (CC QR)	(Portugal) Vitória SC (CC QR)	(Lithuania) EVK Zaibas (CC QR)	(Bosnia and Herzegovina) VK Banja Luka (CC QR)
Qualification round I	(Turkey) Enka Sport Club (2nd)	(Turkey) Heybeliada ASC (3rd)	(Portugal) Clube Naval Povoense (5th)	(Switzerland) Carouge Natation (2nd)
Qualification round I	(Slovenia) AVK Branik Maribor (1st)	(Slovenia) VK Ljubljana Slovan (2nd)	(United Kingdom) West London Penguin (1st)	(United Kingdom) Welsh Wanderers (3rd)
Qualification round I	(Belgium) Royal Dauphins Mouscronnois (1st)	(Israel) Hapoel Palram Zvulun (1st)	(Cyprus) APOEL Nicosia (1st)	(Malta) San Giljan ASC (1st)
Qualification round I	(Malta) Sliema ASC (2nd)	(Finland) Cetus Espoo (1st)		

==== Name changes ====
The following teams' names were changed during the season.

Original name	New name	Matchday
(Malta) Sliema ASC	(Malta) Sliema ASC Nexawin	Qualification round II

== Rounds and draw dates ==
=== Schedule ===
Phase	Draw date	Round date
Qualification round I	11 August 2025	28–30 November 2025
Qualification round II	8 December 2025	13–15 February 2026
Final classification	8 December 2025	13–15 February 2026
Final Eight	16 February 2026	12–15 March 2026

== Qualification round I ==
The top two qualify for the next round. The draw was on 11 August 2025 in Zagreb, Croatia. The seeding is based on the club rankings.

=== Group A ===
- 28–30 November 2025, Valletta, Malta.

Pos	Team	Pld	W	PSW	PSL	L	GF	GA	GD	Pts	Qualification	SLI	GIL	HAP	APO
1	(Malta) Sliema ASC (H)	3	3	0	0	0	65	35	+30	9	Qualification round II	—	—	18–13	28–9
2	(Malta) San Giljan ASC	3	2	0	0	1	53	39	+14	6	Qualification round II	13–19	—	—	—
3	(Israel) Hapoel Palram Zvulun	3	1	0	0	2	40	44	−4	3		—	10–14	—	17–12
4	(Cyprus) APOEL Nicosia	3	0	0	0	3	31	71	−40	0		—	—	10–26	—

Source: European Aquatics Challenger Cup
(H) Host

=== Group B ===
- 28–30 November 2025, Maribor, Slovenia.

Pos	Team	Pld	W	PSW	PSL	L	GF	GA	GD	Pts	Qualification	MAR	CAR	SLO	NAV
1	(Slovenia) AVK Branik Maribor (H)	3	3	0	0	0	58	31	+27	9	Qualification round II	—	20–13	17–12	21–6
2	(Switzerland) Carouge Natation	3	2	0	0	1	44	40	+4	6	Qualification round II	—	—	—	—
3	(Slovenia) VK Ljubljana Slovan	3	1	0	0	2	38	42	−4	3		—	9–13	—	17–12
4	(Portugal) Club Naval Povoense	3	0	0	0	3	29	56	−27	0		—	11–18	—	—

Source: European Aquatics Challenger Cup
(H) Host

=== Group C ===
- 28–30 November 2025, Istanbul, Turkey.

Pos	Team	Pld	W	PSW	PSL	L	GF	GA	GD	Pts	Qualification	ENKA	HEY	WEL
1	(Turkey) Enka Sport Club (H)	2	2	0	0	0	52	17	+35	6	Qualification round II	—	21–7	31–10
2	(Turkey) Heybeliada ASC	2	1	0	0	1	29	33	−4	3	Qualification round II	—	—	—
3	(United Kingdom) Welsh Wanderers	2	0	0	0	2	22	53	−31	0		—	12–22	—

Source: European Aquatics Challenger Cup
(H) Host

=== Group D ===
- 28–30 November 2025, Mouscron, Belgium.

Pos	Team	Pld	W	PSW	PSL	L	GF	GA	GD	Pts	Qualification	MOU	CET	PEN
1	(Belgium) RD Mouscronnois (H)	2	2	0	0	0	39	26	+13	6	Qualification round II	—	15–12	24–14
2	(Finland) Cetus Espoo	2	1	0	0	1	24	24	0	3	Qualification round II	—	—	12–9
3	(United Kingdom) West London Penguin	2	0	0	0	2	23	36	−13	0		—	—	—

Source: European Aquatics Challenger Cup
(H) Host

== Qualification round II ==
The top two teams in each group qualify will advance to the next round. The draw was on 8 December 2025 in Zagreb, Croatia.

=== Group A ===
13–15 February 2026, Elektrėnai, Lithuania.

Pos	Team	Pld	W	PSW	PSL	L	GF	GA	GD	Pts	Qualification	SLI	ZAI	CET
1	(Malta) Sliema ASC Nexawin	2	2	0	0	0	35	24	+11	6	Final Eight	—	—	23–14
2	(Lithuania) EVK Zaibas (H)	2	1	0	0	1	31	23	+8	3	Final Eight	10–12	—	21–11
3	(Finland) Cetus Espoo	2	0	0	0	2	25	44	−19	0		—	—	—

Source: European Aquatics Challenger Cup
(H) Host

=== Group B ===
13–15 February 2026, Maribor, Slovenia.

Pos	Team	Pld	W	PSW	PSL	L	GF	GA	GD	Pts	Qualification	GIL	MAR	BAN
1	(Malta) San Giljan ASC	2	2	0	0	0	48	21	+27	6	Final Eight	—	—	—
2	(Slovenia) AVK Branik Maribor (H)	2	1	0	0	1	53	32	+21	3	Final Eight	19–21	—	34–11
3	(Bosnia and Herzegovina) VK Banja Luka	2	0	0	0	2	13	61	−48	0		2–27	—	—

Source: European Aquatics Challenger Cup
(H) Host

=== Group C ===
13–15 February 2026, Istanbul, Turkey.

Pos	Team	Pld	W	PSW	PSL	L	GF	GA	GD	Pts	Qualification	ENK	GAL	CAR
1	(Turkey) Enka Sport Club	2	2	0	0	0	35	21	+14	6	Final Eight	—	—	20–7
2	(Turkey) Galatasaray SK (H)	2	1	0	0	1	42	19	+23	3	Final Eight	14–15	—	28–4
3	(Switzerland) Carouge Natation	2	0	0	0	2	11	48	−37	0		—	—	—

Source: European Aquatics Challenger Cup
(H) Host

=== Group D ===
13–15 February 2026, Maribor, Slovenia.

Pos	Team	Pld	W	PSW	PSL	L	GF	GA	GD	Pts	Qualification	VIT	HEY	MOU
1	(Portugal) Vitória SC	2	2	0	0	0	29	26	+3	6	Final Eight	—	—	18–17
2	(Turkey) Heybeliada ASC	2	0	1	0	1	25	27	−2	2	Final Eight	9–11	—	—
3	(Belgium) RD Mouscronnois	2	0	0	1	1	33	34	−1	1		—	20–21 (Note: Match ended 16–16. Heybeliada ASC won 4–5 on penalties.)	—

Source: European Aquatics Challenger Cup

== Final classification ==
=== 9–12th place group ===
- 14–15 March 2026, Mouscron, Belgium.

Pos	Team	Pld	W	PSW	PSL	L	GF	GA	GD	Pts	MOU	CAR	CET	BAN
9	(Belgium) RD Mouscronnois (H)	3	3	0	0	0	59	27	+32	9	—	10–9	16–11	33–7
10	(Switzerland) Carouge Natation	3	2	0	0	1	45	28	+17	6	—	—	14–9	22–9
11	(Finland) Cetus Espoo	3	1	0	0	2	51	42	+9	3	—	—	—	31–12
12	(Bosnia and Herzegovina) VK Banja Luka	3	0	0	0	3	28	86	−58	0	—	—	—	—

Source: European Aquatics Challenger Cup
(H) Host

=== 13–18th place group ===
- 13–15 February 2026, Ljubljana, Slovenia.

Pos	Team	Pld	W	PSW	PSL	L	GF	GA	GD	Pts	HAP	SLO	PEN	NAV	APO	WEL
13	(Israel) Hapoel Palram Zvulun	5	5	0	0	0	103	46	+57	15	—	—	—	—	21–9	—
14	(Slovenia) VK Ljubljana Slovan (H)	5	4	0	0	1	87	65	+22	12	13–17	—	19–14	—	16–11	21–13
15	(United Kingdom) West London Penguin	5	2	0	0	3	54	71	−17	6 (Note: West London Penguin 16–14 Club Naval Povoense)	6–20	—	—	—	8–9	10–9
16	(Portugal) Club Naval Povoense	5	2	0	0	3	61	85	−24	6	8–25	10–18	14–16	—	13–11	16–15
17	(Cyprus) APOEL Nicosia	5	1	0	1	3	51	69	−18	4	—	—	—	—	—	—
18	(United Kingdom) Welsh Wanderers	5	0	1	0	4	58	78	−20	2	10–20	—	—	—	21–20 (Note: Match ended 11–11. Welsh Wanderers won 10–9 on penalties.)	—

Source: European Aquatics Challenger Cup
(H) Host

== Final Eight ==
The draw was on 16 February 2026 in Zagreb, Croatia. The Final Eight was held in Istanbul by Enka Sport Club from 12–15 March 2026.

=== Group A ===
Pos	Team	Pld	W	PSW	PSL	L	GF	GA	GD	Pts	Qualification	ZAI	ENK	MAR	VIT
1	(Lithuania) EVK Zaibas	3	3	0	0	0	47	34	+13	9	Semi-finals	—	—	—	16–14
2	(Turkey) Enka Sport Club (H)	3	2	0	0	1	49	38	+11	6	Semi-finals	11–16	—	21–13	17–9
3	(Slovenia) AVK Branik Maribor	3	1	0	0	2	40	52	−12	3	5th place match	9–15	—	—	—
4	(Portugal) Vitória SC	3	0	0	0	3	39	51	−12	0	7th place match	—	—	16–18	—

Source: European Aquatics Challenger Cup
(H) Host

=== Group B ===
Pos	Team	Pld	W	PSW	PSL	L	GF	GA	GD	Pts	Qualification	GAL	SLI	GIL	HEY
1	(Turkey) Galatasaray SK	3	3	0	0	0	55	25	+30	9	Semi-finals	—	—	—	18–7
2	(Malta) Sliema ASC Nexawin	3	2	0	0	1	46	49	−3	6	Semi-finals	5–23	—	16–15	25–11
3	(Malta) San Giljan ASC	3	1	0	0	2	50	46	+4	3	5th place match	13–14	—	—	—
4	(Turkey) Heybeliada ASC	3	0	0	0	3	34	65	−31	0	7th place match	—	—	16–22	—

Source: European Aquatics Challenger Cup

=== Knockout stage ===
==== 7th place match ====
7th place match
14 March
(Portugal) Vitória SC	18
(Turkey) Heybeliada ASC	9

==== 5th place match ====
5th place match
14 March
(Slovenia) AVK Branik Maribor	9
(Malta) San Giljan ASC	24

==== Bracket ====
Semi-finals
(Lithuania) EVK Zaibas	13 (5)
(Malta) Sliema ASC Nexawin	13 (3)
(Turkey) Galatasaray SK	20
(Turkey) Enka Sport Club	9

Final
(Lithuania) EVK Zaibas	11
(Turkey) Galatasaray SK	13
Third place
(Malta) Sliema ASC Nexawin	17
(Turkey) Enka Sport Club	15

==== Third place game ====
15 March 2026; 10:00	Report	Sliema ASC Nexawin (Malta)	17–15	(Turkey) Enka Sport Club	Enka Sport Club Pool, Istanbul; Referees: Manuel Manea (ROU), Roeland Sonnemans (NED)
15 March 2026; 10:00	Report	Score by quarters: 4–6, 6–3, 5–3, 2–3			Enka Sport Club Pool, Istanbul; Referees: Manuel Manea (ROU), Roeland Sonnemans (NED)
15 March 2026; 10:00	Report	Cachia 4	Goals	Duzenli 4	Enka Sport Club Pool, Istanbul; Referees: Manuel Manea (ROU), Roeland Sonnemans (NED)

==== Final ====
15 March 2026; 12:30	Report	EVK Zaibas (Lithuania)	11–13	(Turkey) Galatasaray SK	Enka Sport Club Pool, Istanbul; Referees: Andreja Stanojevic (SRB), Vlaho Radicevic (CRO)
15 March 2026; 12:30	Report	Score by quarters: 6–5, 2–4, 1–2, 2–2			Enka Sport Club Pool, Istanbul; Referees: Andreja Stanojevic (SRB), Vlaho Radicevic (CRO)
15 March 2026; 12:30	Report	Jelača 4	Goals	Gak 3	Enka Sport Club Pool, Istanbul; Referees: Andreja Stanojevic (SRB), Vlaho Radicevic (CRO)

2025–26 European Aquatics Challenger Cup Champions
(Turkey)
Galatasaray SK
Second title

== See also ==
- 2025–26 European Aquatics Champions League
- 2025–26 European Aquatics Euro Cup
- 2025–26 European Aquatics Conference Cup
- 2025 European Aquatics Super Cup
- 2025–26 European Aquatics Women's Champions League
- 2025–26 European Aquatics Women's Euro Cup
- 2025–26 European Aquatics Women's Conference Cup
- 2025–26 European Aquatics Women's Challenger Cup
- 2025 European Aquatics Women's Super Cup
