= 2025–26 European Aquatics Challenger Cup final classification =

Tournament information
- Sport: Water polo
- Date: 14–15 March 2026 (9–12th place group); 28–30 November 2025 (13–18th place group)
- Host(s): (Belgium) Mouscron (Slovenia) Ljubljana
- Teams: 10 (from 9 countries)
- Website: Official website

Tournament statistics
- Matches played: 21

The 2025–26 European Aquatics Challenger Cup final classification was played to decide the final standing of the 2025–26 European Aquatics Challenger Cup and give clubs of the level more exposure on the European scene.

== Format ==
In each group, teams will play against each other once in a round-robin format.

Teams are ranked according to points (3 points for a win, 2 points for a penalty shootout win, 1 point for a penalty shootout loss, 0 points for a loss), and if tied on points, the following tiebreaking criteria are applied, in the order given, to determine the rankings:

- Points in head-to-head matches among tied teams;
- Goal difference in head-to-head matches among tied teams;
- Goals scored in head-to-head matches among tied teams;
- Goal difference in all group matches;
- Goals scored in all group matches.

== Group composition ==
=== 9–12th place group ===
- Eliminated teams from Challenger Cup qualification round II

Teams
(Finland) Cetus Espoo
(Bosnia and Herzegovina) VK Banja Luka
(Switzerland) Carouge Natation
(Belgium) RD Mouscronnois

=== 13–18th place group ===
- Eliminated teams from Challenger Cup qualification round I

Teams
(Israel) Hapoel Palram Zvulun
(Cyprus) APOEL Nicosia
(Slovenia) VK Ljubljana Slovan
(Portugal) Club Naval Povoense
(United Kingdom) Welsh Wanderers
(United Kingdom) West London Penguin

== Groups ==
=== 9–12th place group ===
14–15 March 2026, Mouscron, Belgium.

Pos	Team	Pld	W	PSW	PSL	L	GF	GA	GD	Pts	MOU	CAR	CET	BAN
9	(Belgium) RD Mouscronnois (H)	3	3	0	0	0	59	27	+32	9	—	10–9	16–11	33–7
10	(Switzerland) Carouge Natation	3	2	0	0	1	45	28	+17	6	—	—	14–9	22–9
11	(Finland) Cetus Espoo	3	1	0	0	2	51	42	+9	3	—	—	—	31–12
12	(Bosnia and Herzegovina) VK Banja Luka	3	0	0	0	3	28	86	−58	0	—	—	—	—

Source: European Aquatics Challenger Cup
(H) Host

14 March 2026; 09:00	Report	Carouge Natation (Switzerland)	14–9	(Finland) Cetus Espoo	Les Dauphins Olympic Swimming Pool, Mouscron; Referees: Gregory Courbin (FRA), Karel Dvoracek (CZE)
14 March 2026; 09:00	Report	Score by quarters: 2–2, 4–5, 4–2, 4–0			Les Dauphins Olympic Swimming Pool, Mouscron; Referees: Gregory Courbin (FRA), Karel Dvoracek (CZE)
14 March 2026; 09:00	Report	Maddern 5	Goals	Perkovic 3	Les Dauphins Olympic Swimming Pool, Mouscron; Referees: Gregory Courbin (FRA), Karel Dvoracek (CZE)

14 March 2026; 11:00	Report	RD Mouscronnois (Belgium)	33–7	(Bosnia and Herzegovina) VK Banja Luka	Les Dauphins Olympic Swimming Pool, Mouscron; Referees: Tobias Laufer (GER), Georg Schoen (AUT)
14 March 2026; 11:00	Report	Score by quarters: 8–1, 9–2, 6–3, 10–1			Les Dauphins Olympic Swimming Pool, Mouscron; Referees: Tobias Laufer (GER), Georg Schoen (AUT)
14 March 2026; 11:00	Report	Hegedus, Labreg 6	Goals	Kojcinovic 4	Les Dauphins Olympic Swimming Pool, Mouscron; Referees: Tobias Laufer (GER), Georg Schoen (AUT)

14 March 2026; 18:30	Report	Cetus Espoo (Finland)	31–12	(Bosnia and Herzegovina) VK Banja Luka	Les Dauphins Olympic Swimming Pool, Mouscron; Referees: Gregory Courbin (FRA), Tobias Laufer (GER)
14 March 2026; 18:30	Report	Score by quarters: 3–3, 12–3, 10–3, 6–3			Les Dauphins Olympic Swimming Pool, Mouscron; Referees: Gregory Courbin (FRA), Tobias Laufer (GER)
14 March 2026; 18:30	Report	Hajdu 7	Goals	Kojcinovic 6	Les Dauphins Olympic Swimming Pool, Mouscron; Referees: Gregory Courbin (FRA), Tobias Laufer (GER)

14 March 2026; 20:30	Report	RD Mouscronnois (Belgium)	10–9	(Switzerland) Carouge Natation	Les Dauphins Olympic Swimming Pool, Mouscron; Referees: Karel Dvoracek (CZE), Georg Schoen (AUT)
14 March 2026; 20:30	Report	Score by quarters: 4–3, 3–2, 2–3, 1–1			Les Dauphins Olympic Swimming Pool, Mouscron; Referees: Karel Dvoracek (CZE), Georg Schoen (AUT)
14 March 2026; 20:30	Report	Hegedus 3	Goals	Melet 3	Les Dauphins Olympic Swimming Pool, Mouscron; Referees: Karel Dvoracek (CZE), Georg Schoen (AUT)

15 March 2026; 09:00	Report	Carouge Natation (Switzerland)	22–9	(Bosnia and Herzegovina) VK Banja Luka	Les Dauphins Olympic Swimming Pool, Mouscron; Referees: Gregory Courbin (FRA), Georg Schoen (AUT)
15 March 2026; 09:00	Report	Score by quarters: 5–1, 5–3, 6–3, 6–2			Les Dauphins Olympic Swimming Pool, Mouscron; Referees: Gregory Courbin (FRA), Georg Schoen (AUT)
15 March 2026; 09:00	Report	Ardisson, Maddern 5	Goals	Kojcinovic 5	Les Dauphins Olympic Swimming Pool, Mouscron; Referees: Gregory Courbin (FRA), Georg Schoen (AUT)

15 March 2026; 11:00	Report	RD Mouscronnois (Belgium)	16–11	(Finland) Cetus Espoo	Les Dauphins Olympic Swimming Pool, Mouscron; Referees: Tobias Laufer (GER), Karel Dvoracek (CZE)
15 March 2026; 11:00	Report	Score by quarters: 4–1, 6–3, 3–1, 3–6			Les Dauphins Olympic Swimming Pool, Mouscron; Referees: Tobias Laufer (GER), Karel Dvoracek (CZE)
15 March 2026; 11:00	Report	Canonne 4	Goals	Krivokapic 3	Les Dauphins Olympic Swimming Pool, Mouscron; Referees: Tobias Laufer (GER), Karel Dvoracek (CZE)

=== 13–18th place group ===
- 13–15 February 2026, Ljubljana, Slovenia.

Pos	Team	Pld	W	PSW	PSL	L	GF	GA	GD	Pts	HAP	SLO	PEN	NAV	APO	WEL
13	(Israel) Hapoel Palram Zvulun	5	5	0	0	0	103	46	+57	15	—	—	—	—	21–9	—
14	(Slovenia) VK Ljubljana Slovan (H)	5	4	0	0	1	87	65	+22	12	13–17	—	19–14	—	16–11	21–13
15	(United Kingdom) West London Penguin	5	2	0	0	3	54	71	−17	6 (Note: West London Penguin 16–14 Club Naval Povoense)	6–20	—	—	—	8–9	10–9
16	(Portugal) Club Naval Povoense	5	2	0	0	3	61	85	−24	6	8–25	10–18	14–16	—	13–11	16–15
17	(Cyprus) APOEL Nicosia	5	1	0	1	3	51	69	−18	4	—	—	—	—	—	—
18	(United Kingdom) Welsh Wanderers	5	0	1	0	4	58	78	−20	2	10–20	—	—	—	21–20 (Note: Match ended 11–11. Welsh Wanderers won 10–9 on penalties.)	—

Source: European Aquatics Challenger Cup
(H) Host
Notes:

13 February 2026; 09:00	Report	Welsh Wanderers (United Kingdom)	21–20 (PSO)	(Cyprus) APOEL Nicosia	Ilirija Swimming Pool, Ljubljana; Referees: Lukasz Czaplinski (POL), Berk Gunkut (TUR)
13 February 2026; 09:00	Report	Score by quarters: 2–4, 3–4, 1–2, 5–1 PSO: 10–9			Ilirija Swimming Pool, Ljubljana; Referees: Lukasz Czaplinski (POL), Berk Gunkut (TUR)
13 February 2026; 09:00	Report	Griffiths 4	Goals	Milas 4	Ilirija Swimming Pool, Ljubljana; Referees: Lukasz Czaplinski (POL), Berk Gunkut (TUR)

13 February 2026; 10:30	Report	Club Naval Povoense (Portugal)	8–25	(Israel) Hapoel Palram Zvulun	Ilirija Swimming Pool, Ljubljana; Referees: Jakub Necas (CZE), Rastko Prlic (SRB)
13 February 2026; 10:30	Report	Score by quarters: 1–6, 2–6, 4–7, 1–6			Ilirija Swimming Pool, Ljubljana; Referees: Jakub Necas (CZE), Rastko Prlic (SRB)
13 February 2026; 10:30	Report	Magalhães 4	Goals	Shafrir 6	Ilirija Swimming Pool, Ljubljana; Referees: Jakub Necas (CZE), Rastko Prlic (SRB)

13 February 2026; 12:00	Report	VK Ljubljana Slovan (Slovenia)	19–14	(United Kingdom) West London Penguin	Ilirija Swimming Pool, Ljubljana; Referees: Johan de Boer (NED), Henning Schuermann (GER)
13 February 2026; 12:00	Report	Score by quarters: 6–2, 5–3, 5–5, 3–4			Ilirija Swimming Pool, Ljubljana; Referees: Johan de Boer (NED), Henning Schuermann (GER)
13 February 2026; 12:00	Report	Potočnik 8	Goals	Kingsmill 4	Ilirija Swimming Pool, Ljubljana; Referees: Johan de Boer (NED), Henning Schuermann (GER)

13 February 2026; 17:00	Report	Welsh Wanderers (United Kingdom)	10–20	(Israel) Hapoel Palram Zvulun	Ilirija Swimming Pool, Ljubljana; Referees: Berk Gunkut (TUR), Henning Schuermann (GER)
13 February 2026; 17:00	Report	Score by quarters: 0–4, 4–3, 4–6, 2–7			Ilirija Swimming Pool, Ljubljana; Referees: Berk Gunkut (TUR), Henning Schuermann (GER)
13 February 2026; 17:00	Report	Carter 3	Goals	Schlein 4	Ilirija Swimming Pool, Ljubljana; Referees: Berk Gunkut (TUR), Henning Schuermann (GER)

13 February 2026; 18:30	Report	West London Penguin (United Kingdom)	8–9	(Cyprus) APOEL Nicosia	Ilirija Swimming Pool, Ljubljana; Referees: Jakub Necas (CZE), Johan de Boer (NED)
13 February 2026; 18:30	Report	Score by quarters: 1–3, 2–1, 3–2, 2–3			Ilirija Swimming Pool, Ljubljana; Referees: Jakub Necas (CZE), Johan de Boer (NED)
13 February 2026; 18:30	Report	Kingsmill 4	Goals	Nikolaou 3	Ilirija Swimming Pool, Ljubljana; Referees: Jakub Necas (CZE), Johan de Boer (NED)

13 February 2026; 20:00	Report	Club Naval Povoense (Portugal)	10–18	(Slovenia) VK Ljubljana Slovan	Ilirija Swimming Pool, Ljubljana; Referees: Lukasz Czaplinski (POL), Rastko Prlic (SRB)
13 February 2026; 20:00	Report	Score by quarters: 1–5, 1–4, 1–4, 7–5			Ilirija Swimming Pool, Ljubljana; Referees: Lukasz Czaplinski (POL), Rastko Prlic (SRB)
13 February 2026; 20:00	Report	Marques Mineiro 4	Goals	Čanč 5	Ilirija Swimming Pool, Ljubljana; Referees: Lukasz Czaplinski (POL), Rastko Prlic (SRB)

14 February 2026; 09:00	Report	Club Naval Povoense (Portugal)	13–11	(Cyprus) APOEL Nicosia	Ilirija Swimming Pool, Ljubljana; Referees: Lukasz Czaplinski (POL), Henning Schuermann (GER)
14 February 2026; 09:00	Report	Score by quarters: 3–2, 2–1, 3–3, 5–5			Ilirija Swimming Pool, Ljubljana; Referees: Lukasz Czaplinski (POL), Henning Schuermann (GER)
14 February 2026; 09:00	Report	Manuel Moreira 7	Goals	three players 2	Ilirija Swimming Pool, Ljubljana; Referees: Lukasz Czaplinski (POL), Henning Schuermann (GER)

14 February 2026; 10:30	Report	VK Ljubljana Slovan (Slovenia)	13–17	(Israel) Hapoel Palram Zvulun	Ilirija Swimming Pool, Ljubljana; Referees: Rastko Prlic (SRB), Johan de Boer (NED)
14 February 2026; 10:30	Report	Score by quarters: 2–3, 4–4, 4–5, 3–5			Ilirija Swimming Pool, Ljubljana; Referees: Rastko Prlic (SRB), Johan de Boer (NED)
14 February 2026; 10:30	Report	Lipnik 5	Goals	Gros 5	Ilirija Swimming Pool, Ljubljana; Referees: Rastko Prlic (SRB), Johan de Boer (NED)

14 February 2026; 12:00	Report	West London Penguin (United Kingdom)	10–9	(United Kingdom) Welsh Wanderers	Ilirija Swimming Pool, Ljubljana; Referees: Berk Gunkut (TUR), Jakub Necas (CZE)
14 February 2026; 12:00	Report	Score by quarters: 3–1, 3–2, 3–3, 1–3			Ilirija Swimming Pool, Ljubljana; Referees: Berk Gunkut (TUR), Jakub Necas (CZE)
14 February 2026; 12:00	Report	Kingsmill 4	Goals	three players 2	Ilirija Swimming Pool, Ljubljana; Referees: Berk Gunkut (TUR), Jakub Necas (CZE)

14 February 2026; 17:00	Report	Hapoel Palram Zvulun (Israel)	21–9	(Cyprus) APOEL Nicosia	Ilirija Swimming Pool, Ljubljana; Referees: Rastko Prlic (SRB), Berk Gunkut (TUR)
14 February 2026; 17:00	Report	Score by quarters: 6–3, 6–3, 5–0, 4–3			Ilirija Swimming Pool, Ljubljana; Referees: Rastko Prlic (SRB), Berk Gunkut (TUR)
14 February 2026; 17:00	Report	Gros 5	Goals	three players 2	Ilirija Swimming Pool, Ljubljana; Referees: Rastko Prlic (SRB), Berk Gunkut (TUR)

14 February 2026; 18:30	Report	Club Naval Povoense (Portugal)	14–16	(United Kingdom) West London Penguin	Ilirija Swimming Pool, Ljubljana; Referees: Johan de Boer (NED), Lukasz Czaplinski (POL)
14 February 2026; 18:30	Report	Score by quarters: 3–5, 6–3, 2–6, 3–2			Ilirija Swimming Pool, Ljubljana; Referees: Johan de Boer (NED), Lukasz Czaplinski (POL)
14 February 2026; 18:30	Report	Marques Mineiro 5	Goals	Kingsmill 4	Ilirija Swimming Pool, Ljubljana; Referees: Johan de Boer (NED), Lukasz Czaplinski (POL)

14 February 2026; 20:00	Report	VK Ljubljana Slovan (Slovenia)	21–13	(United Kingdom) Welsh Wanderers	Ilirija Swimming Pool, Ljubljana; Referees: Henning Schuermann (GER), Jakub Necas (CZE)
14 February 2026; 20:00	Report	Score by quarters: 3–2, 5–3, 5–4, 8–4			Ilirija Swimming Pool, Ljubljana; Referees: Henning Schuermann (GER), Jakub Necas (CZE)
14 February 2026; 20:00	Report	Lipnik 7	Goals	Jenkins-Delf 5	Ilirija Swimming Pool, Ljubljana; Referees: Henning Schuermann (GER), Jakub Necas (CZE)

15 February 2026; 09:00	Report	West London Penguin (United Kingdom)	6–20	(Israel) Hapoel Palram Zvulun	Ilirija Swimming Pool, Ljubljana; Referees: Johan de Boer (NED), Berk Gunkut (TUR)
15 February 2026; 09:00	Report	Score by quarters: 1–5, 3–5, 1–4, 1–6			Ilirija Swimming Pool, Ljubljana; Referees: Johan de Boer (NED), Berk Gunkut (TUR)
15 February 2026; 09:00	Report	Kingsmill 3	Goals	Halevy, Horesh 5	Ilirija Swimming Pool, Ljubljana; Referees: Johan de Boer (NED), Berk Gunkut (TUR)

14 February 2026; 10:30	Report	Club Naval Povoense (Portugal)	16–15	(United Kingdom) Welsh Wanderers	Ilirija Swimming Pool, Ljubljana; Referees: Henning Schuermann (GER), Rastko Prlic (SRB)
14 February 2026; 10:30	Report	Score by quarters: 5–3, 3–4, 4–2, 4–6			Ilirija Swimming Pool, Ljubljana; Referees: Henning Schuermann (GER), Rastko Prlic (SRB)
14 February 2026; 10:30	Report	Marques Mineiro 6	Goals	Jenkins-Delf, Laxton 3	Ilirija Swimming Pool, Ljubljana; Referees: Henning Schuermann (GER), Rastko Prlic (SRB)

15 February 2026; 12:00	Report	VK Ljubljana Slovan (Slovenia)	16–11	(Cyprus) APOEL Nicosia	Ilirija Swimming Pool, Ljubljana; Referees: Jakub Necas (CZE), Lukasz Czaplinski (POL)
15 February 2026; 12:00	Report	Score by quarters: 5–3, 3–3, 3–1, 5–4			Ilirija Swimming Pool, Ljubljana; Referees: Jakub Necas (CZE), Lukasz Czaplinski (POL)
15 February 2026; 12:00	Report	Lipnik 5	Goals	Nikolaou 5	Ilirija Swimming Pool, Ljubljana; Referees: Jakub Necas (CZE), Lukasz Czaplinski (POL)

== See also ==
- 2025–26 European Aquatics Champions League
- 2025–26 European Aquatics Euro Cup
- 2025–26 European Aquatics Conference Cup
- 2025–26 European Aquatics Challenger Cup
- 2025 European Aquatics Super Cup
- 2025–26 European Aquatics Women's Champions League
- 2025–26 European Aquatics Women's Euro Cup
- 2025–26 European Aquatics Women's Conference Cup
- 2025–26 European Aquatics Women's Challenger Cup
- 2025 European Aquatics Women's Super Cup

Reference
Matchday 1
Matchday 2

Reference
Matchday 1
Matchday 2
Matchday 3
