= Maribor Branik =

Maribor Branik or Branik Maribor may refer to:

- AVK Branik Maribor, a water polo club
- NK Branik Maribor, an association football club established in January 1949 and dissolved in August 1960
- NK Maribor, an association football club established in December 1960, who joined MŠD Branik sports organization in 1988
- OK Nova KBM Branik, a women's volleyball club
- RK Maribor Branik, a handball club established in 2003
