= Slovenian Water Polo Championship =

Water polo league

Slovenian Championship
- Founded: 1992; 34 years ago
- Country: Slovenia
- Confederation: LEN (Europe)
- Level on pyramid: 1
- Domestic cup: Slovenian Cup
- Current champions: Branik Maribor (3rd title) (2025–26)
- Most championships: Triglav Kranj (19 titles)

The Slovenian Water Polo Championship (Slovene: Državno prvenstvo v vaterpolu) is a water polo league in Slovenia. The league was formed in 1992.

== List of winners ==
Season	Champions
1992	Triglav Kranj
1993	Triglav Kranj
1994	Micom Koper
1994–95	Micom Koper
1995–96	Triglav Kranj
1996–97	Triglav Kranj
1997–98	Triglav Kranj
1998–99	Triglav Kranj
1999–00	Triglav Živila Kranj
2000–01	Triglav Živila Kranj
2001–02	Triglav Živila Kranj
2002–03	Triglav Živila Kranj
2003–04	Triglav Kranj
2004–05	Triglav Kranj
2005–06	Triglav Kranj
2006–07	Olimpija Ljubljana
2007–08	Rokava Koper
2008–09	Rokava Koper
2009–10	Rokava Koper
2010–11	Rokava Koper
2011–12	Triglav Kranj
2012–13	Triglav Kranj
2013–14	Branik Maribor
2014–15	Ljubljana
2015–16	Ljubljana Slovan
2016–17	Ljubljana Slovan
2017–18	Triglav Kranj
2018–19	Koper Primorska
2019–20	Cancelled (COVID-19 pandemic)
2020–21	Calcit Kamnik
2021–22	Triglav Kranj
2022–23	Triglav Kranj
2023–24	Triglav Kranj
2024–25	Branik Maribor
2025–26	Branik Maribor

=== Number of titles ===
Rank	Club	Titles	Winning years
1	Triglav	19	1992, 1993, 1996, 1997, 1998, 1999, 2000, 2001, 2002, 2003, 2004, 2005, 2006, 2012, 2013, 2018, 2022, 2023, 2024
2	Koper	7	1994, 1995, 2008, 2009, 2010, 2011, 2019
3	Branik	3	2014, 2025, 2026
3	Ljubljana	3	2015, 2016, 2017
5	Olimpija	1	2007
5	Calcit Kamnik	1	2021
