= Türkiye Sutopu 1. Ligi =

Turkish water polo league

Turkish Waterpolo Super League Türkiye Sutopu Super Ligi
- First season: 1942
- Country: Turkey
- Confederation: LEN
- Number of clubs: 8
- Level on pyramid: 1
- International cup(s): LEN Euroleague; LEN Trophy; LEN Cup Winners' Cup
- Current champions: Galatasaray SK (2024–25)
- Most championships: Galatasaray SK (30 titles)
- Website: Turkish Water Polo Federation

The Turkish Waterpolo League has been contested since 1942. The current champion is Galatasaray, from Istanbul.

== Teams 2023/24 ==
	Club	Location
1	Galatasaray	Istanbul
2	Enkaspor Waterpolo Team	Istanbul
3	Heybeliada Su Sporları Kulübü	Istanbul
4	Adalar Su Sporları Kulübü	Istanbul
5	Kınalıada Su Sporları Kulübü	Istanbul
6	İzmir Büyükşehir Belediyespor	İzmir
7	ODTÜ Spor Kulübü	Ankara
8	Uludağ Olimpik Sporlar Gençlik ve Spor Kulübü	Bursa

== Champions ==
Club	Wins	Winning years
Galatasaray SK	30	1955, 1957, 1973, 1975, 1977, 1991, 1993, 1994, 1995, 1996, 1997, 1999, 2000, 2001, 2003, 2005, 2006, 2007, 2008, 2009, 2010, 2011, 2012, 2013, 2014, 2015, 2017, 2022, 2024, 2025
Istanbul YiK	25	1961, 1966, 1967, 1968, 1969, 1970, 1971, 1972, 1974, 1976, 1978, 1979, 1980, 1981, 1982, 1983, 1984, 1985, 1986, 1987, 1989, 1992, 1998, 2002, 2004
Adana Demir SK	21	1942, 1943, 1944, 1945, 1946, 1947, 1948, 1949, 1950, 1951, 1952, 1953, 1954, 1956, 1958, 1959, 1960, 1962, 1963, 1964, 1965
Enkaspor Waterpolo Team	5	2016, 2018, 2019, 2021, 2023
Adalar SSK	2	1988, 1990

=== Champions by year ===
Season	Winner
1942	Adana Demir SK (1)
1943	Adana Demir SK (2)
1944	Adana Demir SK (3)
1945	Adana Demir SK (4)
1946	Adana Demir SK (5)
1947	Adana Demir SK (6)
1948	Adana Demir SK (7)
1949	Adana Demir SK (8)
1950	Adana Demir SK (9)
1951	Adana Demir SK (10)
1952	Adana Demir SK (11)
1953	Adana Demir SK (12)
1954	Adana Demir SK (13)
1955	Galatasaray SK (1)
1956	Adana Demir SK (14)
1957	Galatasaray SK (2)
1958	Adana Demir SK (15)
1959	Adana Demir SK (16)
1960	Adana Demir SK (17)
1961	Istanbul YiK (1)
1962	Adana Demir SK (18)
1963	Adana Demir SK (19)
1964	Adana Demir SK (20)
1965	Adana Demir SK (21)
1966	Istanbul YiK (2)
1967	Istanbul YiK (3)
1968	Istanbul YiK (4)
1969	Istanbul YiK (5)
1970	Istanbul YiK (6)
1971	Istanbul YiK (7)
1972	Istanbul YiK (8)
1973	Galatasaray SK (3)
1974	Istanbul YiK (9)
1975	Galatasaray SK (4)
1976	Istanbul YiK (10)
1977	Galatasaray SK (5)
1978	Istanbul YiK (11)
1979	Istanbul YiK (12)
1980	Istanbul YiK (13)
1981	Istanbul YiK (14)
1982	Istanbul YiK (15)
1983	Istanbul YiK (16)
1984	Istanbul YiK (17)
1985	Istanbul YiK (18)
1986	Istanbul YiK (19)
1987	Istanbul YiK (20)
1988	Adalar SSK (1)
1989	Istanbul YiK (21)
1990	Adalar SSK (2)
1991	Galatasaray SK (6)
1992	Istanbul YiK (22)
1993	Galatasaray SK (7)
1994	Galatasaray SK (8)
1995	Galatasaray SK (9)
1996	Galatasaray SK (10)
1997	Galatasaray SK (11)
1998	Istanbul YiK (23)
1999	Galatasaray SK (12)
2000	Galatasaray SK (13)
2001	Galatasaray SK (14)
2002	Istanbul YiK (24)
2003	Galatasaray SK (15)
2004	Istanbul YiK (25)
2005	Galatasaray SK (16)
2006	Galatasaray SK (17)
2007	Galatasaray SK (18)
2008	Galatasaray SK (19)
2009	Galatasaray SK (20)
2010	Galatasaray SK (21)
2011	Galatasaray SK (22)
2012	Galatasaray SK (23)
2013	Galatasaray SK (24)
2014	Galatasaray SK (25)
2015	Galatasaray SK (26)
2016	Enkaspor Waterpolo Team (1)
2017	Galatasaray SK (27)
2018	Enkaspor Waterpolo Team (2)
2019	Enkaspor Waterpolo Team (3)
2020	Canceled due to the COVID-19 pandemic in Turkey
2021	Enkaspor Waterpolo Team (4)
2022	Galatasaray SK (28)
2023	Enkaspor Waterpolo Team (5)
2024	Galatasaray SK (29)
2025	Galatasaray SK (30)
