= KVT Cherno More =

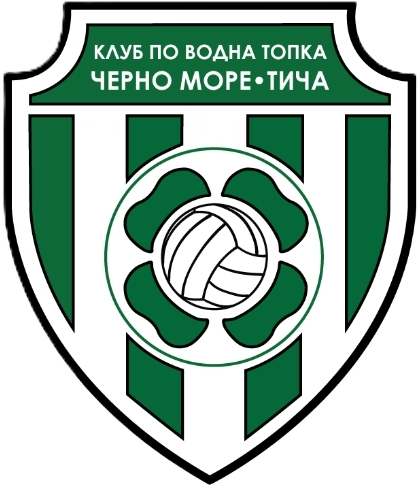
- Nickname: Моряците (The Sailors)
- Founded: 1948
- League: Bulgarian Elite Group
- Location: Varna, Bulgaria
- Home ground: Swimming complex Primorski
- Colors: Green and white
- Head coach: Žarko Petrović, Velizar Kovachev
- Championships: 5 Bulgarian champions 1 Bulgarian Supercup

Waterpolo club Cherno More Ticha (Bulgarian: Клуб по Водна Топка Черно Море Тича) is a professional water polo club from Varna, Bulgaria. The team competes in the Bulgarian Elite Group. They are the current Bulgarian champions and Supercup holders. In the 2026–27 season the team will feature in the LEN Challenger Cup.

== Honours ==
=== Bulgarian Elite Group ===
- Champions (6): 2004, 2008, 2010 2024, 2025, 2026
- Second place (4): 2005, 2007, 2014, 2016
- Third Place (12): 1956, 1973, 1986, 1997, 2000, 2001, 2002, 2003, 2006, 2009, 2015, 2018

=== Bulgarian Super Cup ===
- Champions (1): 2025
