= Sliema A.S.C. =

Waterpolo club from Sliema, Malta

Sliema
- Founded: 1912; 114 years ago
- League: Maltese Waterpolo Premier League
- Based in: Sliema
- Arena: Pixxina Edwin Meli, Sliema
- Colors
- Website: http://www.sliema-asc.org.mt/

Sliema Aquatic Sports Club is a waterpolo club from Sliema, Malta, playing in the Maltese Waterpolo Premier League. The club was founded in 1912 and is the most successful in Malta, with 32 championships and 27 Knock-out Cups.

The Club's original name was Sliema United; the name of Sliema Aquatic Sports Club was assumed in 1930.

The club also has a Swimming section.

In 2014, Dr. Frank Testa, a lawyer, was elected president.

== First team ==
As at May 29, 2026:

=== Current squad ===
- (Malta) Benji Busuttil
- (Malta) Seb Busuttil
- (Malta) Daniel Rizzo
- (Malta) Benji Cachia
- (Malta) Liam galea
- (Malta) Dino Zammit (C)
- (Malta) Sam Engerer
- (Malta) Julian Chircop
- (Malta) Jamie Gambin
- (Malta) Jayden Cassar
- (Malta) Jake Cachia
- (Malta) Giancarlo Gatt
- (Malta) Matthew Bonello Dupuis
- (Malta) Jayden Cutajar
- (Malta) Elijah Schembri
- (Spain) Alberto Barroso
- (Italy) Francesco Di Fulvio

== Coaching Staff ==
As at May 15, 2026:

- Head Coach: (Spain) Joaquim Colet,
- Asst. Coach: (Malta) John Brownrigg
- Asst. Coach: (Spain) Ferran Pascual
- Technical Director: (Malta) Ryan Coleiro
- Team Physio: (Malta) Edward Bonello

== Committee ==
As at November 15, 2025:

- President: George Gregory
- Vice-President: Pat Tabone
- Secretary : Christian Saliba
- Treasurer: Michael Spiteri Stains
- Legal:Nikolai Lubrano
- Women Waterpolo & Club marketing :Travis Boyd
- Vice Secretary : Anton Restall
- Swimming:Carmen Wareing
- Waterpolo Academy:Andrea Bianchi
- Pitch Manager :Josef Petroni
- Club Events:Nicky Pace

== Honours ==
- record
- ^{s} shared record

=== Domestic ===
Competition	Titles	Seasons
Summer League Premier Division	32	1925, 1929, 1932, 1935, 1939, 1946, 1947, 1948, 1953, 1954, 1957, 1962, 1968, 1974, 1975, 1976, 1978, 1979, 1981, 1982, 1983, 1991, 1996, 1998, 1999, 2001, 2002, 2003, 2004, 2008, 2009, 2024
Summer KO Premier Division	27	1935, 1938, 1953, 1954, 1957, 1958, 1960, 1965, 1971, 1974, 1976, 1977, 1979, 1984, 1986, 1991, 1992, 1996, 1997, 1998, 2002, 2007, 2008, 2009, 2010, 2013, 2024
Winter League Premier Division	9	1996, 1998, 1999, 2009, 2010, 2011, 2012, 2014, 2022
Summer League First Division	3	1929 (B team), 1945 (B team), 1979 (B team)
President's Cup	7	1997, 1998, 2005, 2008, 2010, 2012, 2015
Enemed Water Polo Cup	4^{s}	2020, 2022, 2025, 2025–26
Għaqda Ġurnalisti Sport Cup	2	2006, 2007

=== Continental ===
Titles	Competition	Seasons
Bronze medal – third place	European Aquatics Challenger Cup	2025–26

== European record ==
Season	Competition	Round	Country	Club	Leg
2024–25	Challenger Cup	Qualification Round	(Israel)	ASA Tel Aviv	13–8
2024–25	Challenger Cup	Qualification Round	(Portugal)	Clube Fluvial Portuense	15–7
2024–25	Challenger Cup	Qualification Round	(Switzerland)	Carouge Natation	16–5
2024–25	Challenger Cup	Quarter-Finals	(Slovenia)	AVK Slovan Olimpija	15–8
2024–25	Challenger Cup	Quarter-Finals	(Slovenia)	AVK Slovan Olimpija	13–2
2024–25	Challenger Cup	Semi-Finals	(Netherlands)	GZC Donk	17–18
2024–25	Challenger Cup	Semi-Finals	(Netherlands)	GZC Donk	12–12
2025–26	Challenger Cup	Qualification Round 1	(Israel)	Hapoel Palram Zvulun	18–13
2025–26	Challenger Cup	Qualification Round 1	(Malta)	San Ġiljan ASC	19–13
2025–26	Challenger Cup	Qualification Round 1	(Cyprus)	APOEL Nicosia	28–9
2025–26	Challenger Cup	Qualification Round 2	(Finland)	Cetus Espoo	23–14
2025–26	Challenger Cup	Qualification Round 2	(Lithuania)	EVK Zaibas	12–10
2025–26	Challenger Cup	Final 8	(Malta)	San Ġiljan ASC	16–15
2025–26	Challenger Cup	Final 8	(Turkey)	Heybeliada SSK	25–11
2025–26	Challenger Cup	Final 8	(Turkey)	Galatasaray SK	5–23
2025–26	Challenger Cup	Semi-Final	(Lithuania)	EVK Zaibas	13–13 (3–5, P)
2025–26	Challenger Cup	Final for Third	(Turkey)	Enka Istanbul	17–15
2026–27	Challenger Cup	Preliminary Round	(Malta)	Neptunes WPSC	11–13
2026–27	Challenger Cup	Preliminary Round	(Slovenia)	AVK Branik Maribor	26–8
2026–27	Challenger Cup	Preliminary Round	(Israel)	Hapoel Givat Haim	16–7
