= Galatasaray men's water polo team =

Galatasaray Men's Water Polo Team
- Sport: Water polo
- Founded: 1910
- League: Türkiye Sutopu 1. Ligi
- Based in: İstanbul, Turkey
- Arena: Galatasaray Kalamış Facilities
- Colors: Yellow & Red
- President: Dursun Özbek
- Head coach: Halil İbrahim Avcıoğlu
- Championships: 39
- Mascot: Lion
- Website: Galatasaray.org

Galatasaray Men's Water Polo Team is the water polo team of the Turkish sports club Galatasaray S.K.

== History ==
In the 1910s, water polo began to be played for the first time in Istanbul by Galatasaray fans.

Water polo, which became a branch in Bebek Facilities, continued its struggle for many years in Galatasaray Kuruçeşme Island. With the opening of the pool in Kalamış in 1968, it took its place in the water sports center.

In the Turkish Away Water Polo League, which started in the 1950s, it won the championship twice, in 1955 and 1957, and three times, 73, 75 and 77, for a long time in the 1970s. It was suspended for 14 years until 1991.

With the arrival of Hungarian coach Zoltan Gulyas in 1988, importance was given to infrastructure works, and it started to become a branch that tries to train Olympic athletes instead of a branch that makes the children of its members do sports.

In 2011, Galatasaray Men's Water Polo Team won Turkish Water Polo Championship Cup.

== Domestic success ==
- Türkiye Sutopu Şampiyonası:
  - Winners (9): 1931, 1932, 1933, 1934, 1935, 1936, 1937, 1938, 1939
- Türkiye Sutopu 1. Ligi:
  - Winners (31): 1955, 1957, 1973, 1975, 1977, 1991, 1993, 1994, 1995, 1996, 1997, 1999, 2000, 2001, 2003, 2005, 2006, 2007, 2008, 2009, 2010, 2011, 2012, 2013, 2014, 2015, 2017, 2022, 2023, 2024, 2025, 2026

== International success ==
- LEN Champions League:
  - Quarter-Finals (1): 2012–13
- LEN Challenger Cup
  - Winners (2): 2023–24, 2025–26
  - Quarter-Finals (1): 2022–23

== Current squad ==
As of 15 March 2026

No.	Nat.	Player	Birth Date	Position	L/R
–	(Turkey)	Fatih Acar	November 22, 1998 (age 27)	Wing	
–	(Turkey)	Ulvi Burtay Akkaya	May 2, 1998 (age 28)	–	
–	(Turkey)	Orhan Arda Alpman	June 25, 2006 (age 19)	–	
–	(Turkey)	Mithat Onur Ayaksız	May 12, 2006 (age 20)	–	
–	(Turkey)	Selçuk Can Caner	December 3, 2001 (age 24)	–	
–	(Turkey)	Engin Ege Çolak	January 3, 1997 (age 29)	–	
–	(Canada)	Nicolas Constantin-Bicari	December 5, 1991 (age 34)	–	
–	(Turkey)	Atakan Destici	March 9, 1997 (age 29)	–	
–	(Turkey)	Ali Hamza Erdağ	September 1, 2006 (age 19)	–	
–	(Turkey)	Ekin Erkaplan	December 9, 2002 (age 23)	Goalkeeper	
–	(Serbia)	Stefan Gak	February 25, 2002 (age 24)	–	
–	(Turkey)	Osman Selim Gülenç (C)	July 7, 1992 (age 33)	–	
–	(Turkey)	Ömer Faruk İpek	May 8, 2002 (age 24)	Goalkeeper	
–	(Turkey)	Lukas Kaan Koçtürk	March 17, 2008 (age 18)	–	
–	(Serbia)	Marko Krstic	July 2, 1986 (age 39)	–	
–	(Turkey)	Efe Kuloğlu	January 29, 2005 (age 21)	–	
–	(Turkey)	Kasra Mottaghi	December 22, 2009 (age 16)	–	
–	(Turkey)	Efe Naipoğlu	August 5, 2006 (age 19)	–	
–	(Japan)	Ikkei Nitta	April 23, 1998 (age 28)	–	
–	(Turkey)	Ali Çınar Nuray	March 17, 2006 (age 20)	–	
–	(Turkey)	Yağız Kaan Özten	August 14, 2007 (age 18)	Goalkeeper	
–	(Turkey)	Oğuz Berke Senemoğlu	July 3, 1995 (age 30)	–	
–	(Turkey)	Mert Deniz Üçler	September 28, 2009 (age 16)	–	
–	(Montenegro)	Dejan Vujović	February 23, 1999 (age 27)	–	
