= Galatasaray Kalamış Facilities =

Sporting complex in Istanbul, Turkey

- Galatasaray Kalamış Tesisleri
- Location in Istanbul
- Location: Kalamış, Kadıköy, Istanbul, Turkey
- Coordinates: 40.968845°N 29.032663°E
- Owner: Galatasaray Sports Club
- Operator: Galatasaray Sports Club
- Type: Water sports facility

Galatasaray Kalamış Facilities, also known as Kalamış Water Sports and Social Facilities, is a water sports complex in Istanbul, Turkey. The venue serves as a base for Galatasaray Sports Club's sailing branch and its men's and women's water polo teams.

== History ==
The Galatasaray Kalamış Facilities sporting complex was completed in 1960, with the original swimming pool opening in 1967.

== Location ==
Galatasaray Kalamış Facilities is located in the Kalamış neighbourhood of Kadıköy, Istanbul, Also known as Kalamış Water Sports and Social Facilities, the venue is located on a popular beach.

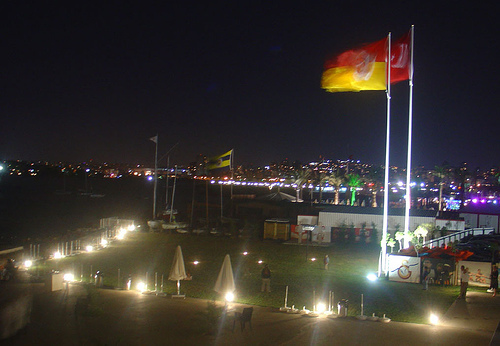
Galatasaray Kalamış Facilities

== Description and uses ==
=== Water polo ===
The complex includes the Engin Bora Water Polo Pool, which was completed in 2013. It is used by Galatasaray's water polo teams for training and domestic league matches. During the 2024–25 Turkish Water Polo Super League season, Galatasaray's men's team secured the league championship, with decisive matches taking place at the Kalamış facility.

The women's water polo team also competes in national league competitions organised by the Turkish Swimming Federation, and conducts training activities at the Kalamış venue.

=== Sailing ===
Galatasaray's sailing branch operates from the Kalamış coastline and participates in regattas organised in the Marmara region. In 2025, Galatasaray teams competed in the Optimist Team Race Istanbul Championship held in Kalamış waters.

The 12th TAYK Slam–Eker Olympos Regatta, organised by the Turkish Open Sea Racing Sports Club (TAYK), also held events in the Kalamış area, with participating teams from multiple Turkish sailing clubs.
