= Vitória S.C. (water polo) =

Portuguese water polo club

Vitória Sport Clube
- Nickname: Vitória de Guimarães; Vitória Waterpolo
- Founded: 2003 (23 years ago)
- League: Portuguese Waterpolo First Division
- Based in: Guimarães, Portugal
- Arena: Guimarães Municipal Swimming Pool Complex (Capacity: 300)
- Colors
- President: Rui Rodrigues
- Head coach: Vítor Macedo
- Championships: Men: 6 Portuguese Leagues; 3 Portuguese Cups; 5 Portuguese Super Cups
- Website: vitoriasc.pt/polo-aquatico/

Vitória Sport Clube is a Portuguese sports club in the city of Guimarães, where different sports are practiced. This article is about its semi-professional water polo section, whose senior men's team competes in the Portuguese Waterpolo League, the highest level of the sport in Portugal.

Vitória Waterpolo, as it is also known, has been using the Guimarães Municipal Swimming Pool Complex as its home since January 2022, as the Vitória Swimming Pools at the academy became degraded, leading to their abandonment, after the Guimarães City Council assumed responsibility for their management in the 1990s. In fact, the club was forced to move its operations to the Guimarães Volunteer Firefighters' Swimming Pools until December 2021, the year in which all activities were closed due to the deficient conditions of its infrastructure.

== History ==
Vitória Water Polo team, founded in 2003, began its activity with former athletes from the Guimarães Volunteer Fire Brigade, Professor Pedro Magalhães and Engineer Pedro Coelho Lima, who were later joined by another former athlete, Professor Jorge Sequeira.

In the 2003/04 season, the senior men's team became Regional Champions and moved on to the National Championships. They later became 2nd Division champions and, after two seasons, moved up to the 1st Division in 2007/08, where they currently remain.

The coaches João Neves, Ranko Malic and Elin Berbic were part of this project. They also managed to sign foreign athletes such as Hungarians Lazlo and Tamas and Serbians Sjrdan, Elin and Nebojsa. During these successes, they also achieved good performances in the youth teams, with a 3rd place in the Junior National Championship, where the current team captain Vítor Macedo was a member, and a 3rd place in the Youth National Championship, with several members who are currently part of the Senior team.

In 2013/14 and 2015/16 he was crowned National Youth Champion (Under-17). In terms of National Teams, the section has always been represented by several athletes in the northern regional team, and in the National Team, the athlete Carlos Machado stands out in the youth team with a 1st place in the International tournament in Sweden, Diogo Pinto in the qualifying phase for the European Junior Championship and also Hélder Frei who arrives in the Seniors with a 1st place in the 6 nations tournament in the Czech Republic.

The greatest achievements have taken place since the 2018/19 season, with Vitória always present in the dispute for the titles of all national competitions, in fact managing to become National Champion of the first division for the Fourth Time in 2022/23, in addition to constantly participating in European competitions, particularly the Champions League.

In 2024/25, the Vitória team achieved a historic Triplet by winning all the competitions that season, and repeated the same feat in 2025/26.

It is worth noting that with the stabilization and accumulation of experience with the conquest of titles, Vitória Waterpolo became one of the main clubs to provide players to the National Team. These results and all the recognition achieved are largely due to the technical team, especially the coach from Guimarães, Vítor Macedo, who has been the "Man at the Helm" of all these achievements.

== Honours ==
This is the sport's official honours list.

=== Seniors ===
National Competitions
| Competition | Titles | Seasons | Runners-up |
|---|---|---|---|
| Primeira Divisão | 6 | 2018/19, 2020/21, 2021/22, 2022/23, 2024/25, 2025/26 | 2023/24 |
| Segunda Divisão | 1 | 2003/04 | - |
| Taça de Portugal | 3 | 2020/21, 2024/25, 2025/26 | 2018/19, 2021/22, 2023/24 |
| Supertaça | 5 | 2019, 2021, 2023, 2024, 2025 | 2022 |
| Total Trophies | 15 | 15 Nationals | 5 Runner-up |

- 2 Participations in the Champions League
- Four-time National Champion in 2022/23
- Achieved the Triplet in 2024/25 and 2025/26

=== Youth categories ===
- National Champion 2nd Division (B Team): 2020/21, 2021/22, 2023/24
- National Champion Youth Men (Under-17): 2013/14, 2018/19
