= 2025 European Aquatics Super Cup =

Water polo match

Tournament details
- Arena: Császár-Komjádi Béla Sport Swimming Pool; Budapest, Hungary
- Dates: 8 October 2025

Final positions
- Champions: (Hungary) FTC-Telekom (5th title)
- Runners-up: (Italy) Pro Recco

Awards and statistics
- Top scorer(s): (Hungary) Krisztián Manhercz, (Hungary) Gergő Fekete (4 goals)

The 2025 European Aquatics Super Cup was the 43rd edition of the annual trophy organised by European Aquatics and contested by the reigning champions of the two European competitions for men's water polo clubs. The match was played between European champions FTC-Telekom (winners of the 2024–25 European Aquatics Champions League) and Pro Recco (winners of the 2024–25 European Aquatics Euro Cup). The match was held on 8 October.

FTC-Telekom won their sixth title in the Super Cup with 15–14 win over Pro Recco.

== Teams ==
Team	Qualification	Previous participation (bold indicates winners)
(Hungary) FTC-Telekom	Winners of the 2024–25 European Aquatics Champions League	**1978**, **1980**, 2017, **2018**, **2019**, **2024**
(Italy) Pro Recco	Winners of the 2024–25 European Aquatics Euro Cup	1984, **2003**, **2007**, **2008**, **2010**, **2012**, **2015**, **2021**, **2022**, **2023**

== Venue ==
The venue is the Császár-Komjádi Béla Sport Swimming Pool in Budapest.

2025 European Aquatics Super Cup is located in Hungary	Budapest
2025 European Aquatics Super Cup is located in Hungary	Császár-Komjádi Béla Sport Swimming Pool

== Final ==
8 October; 20:00	Report	**FTC-Telekom** (Hungary)	**15**–14	(Italy) Pro Recco	Császár-Komjádi Béla Sport Swimming Pool, Budapest; Referees: Georgios Sravridis (GRE), Michiel Zwart (NED)
8 October; 20:00	Report	Score by quarters: **6**–4, 3–**5**, **4**–3, 2–2			Császár-Komjádi Béla Sport Swimming Pool, Budapest; Referees: Georgios Sravridis (GRE), Michiel Zwart (NED)
8 October; 20:00	Report	Manhercz, Fekete (4	**Goals**	Granados 3, Burić	Császár-Komjádi Béla Sport Swimming Pool, Budapest; Referees: Georgios Sravridis (GRE), Michiel Zwart (NED)

2024 European Aquatics Super Cup Champions

**FTC-Telekom**
Sixth title

== See also ==
- 2025–26 European Aquatics Champions League
- 2025–26 European Aquatics Euro Cup
- 2025–26 European Aquatics Conference Cup
- 2025–26 European Aquatics Challenger Cup
- 2025–26 European Aquatics Women's Champions League
- 2025–26 European Aquatics Women's Euro Cup
- 2025–26 European Aquatics Women's Conference Cup
- 2025–26 European Aquatics Women's Challenger Cup
- 2025 European Aquatics Women's Super Cup
