= 2025 European Aquatics Women's Super Cup =

Water polo match

Tournament details
- Arena: Piscina Pere Serrat, Barcelona, Spain
- Dates: 12 October 2025

Final positions
- Champions: (Spain) CN Sant Andreu (1st title)
- Runners-up: (Netherlands) ZV De Zaan

Awards and statistics
- Top scorer(s): (Spain) Elena Ruiz (5 goals)

The 2025 European Aquatics Women's Super Cup was the 19th edition of the annual trophy organised by LEN and contested by the reigning champions of the two European competitions for women's water polo clubs. The match was between European champions CN Sant Andreu (winners of the 2024–25 LEN Women's Champions League) and ZV De Zaan (winners of the 2024–25 LEN Women's Euro Cup). The match was held on 12 October 2025.

CN Sant Andreu won their first title in the Super Cup with a win over ZV De Zaan.

== Teams ==
Team	Qualification	Previous participation (bold indicates winners)
(Spain) CN Sant Andreu	Winners of the 2024–25 LEN Women's Champions League	Debut
(Netherlands) ZV De Zaan	Winners of the 2024–25 LEN Women's Euro Cup	Debut

== Venue ==
The venue is the Piscina Pere Serrat in Barcelona.

Piscina Pere Serrat
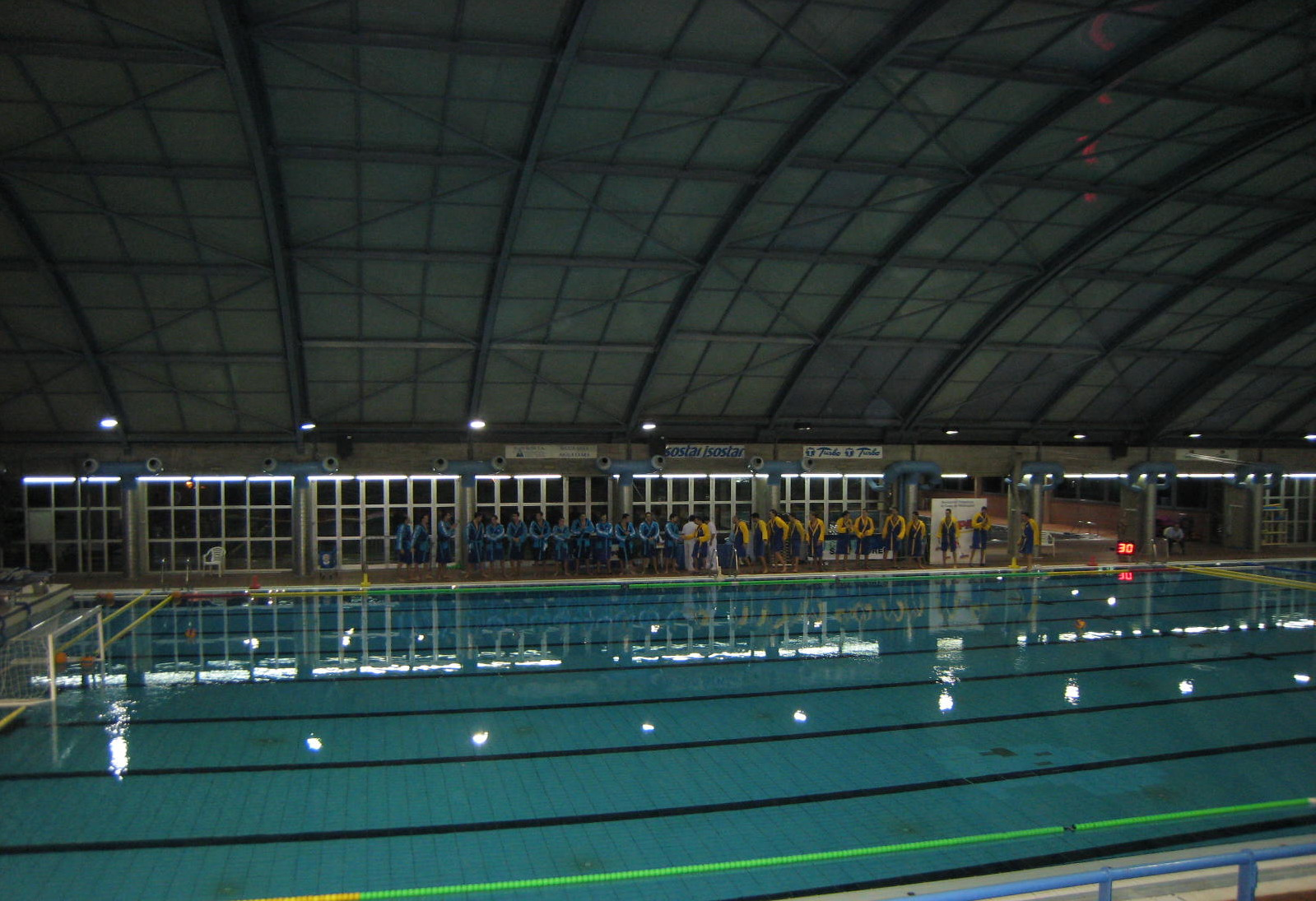

== Final ==
12 October; 14:00	Report	**CN Sant Andreu** (Spain)	**17**–10	(Netherlands) ZV De Zaan	Piscina Pere Serrat, Barcelona; Referees: Alessia Ferrari (ITA), Nikolett Sajben (HUN)
12 October; 14:00	Report	Score by quarters: **7**–3, **4**–3, **3**–1, 3–3			Piscina Pere Serrat, Barcelona; Referees: Alessia Ferrari (ITA), Nikolett Sajben (HUN)
12 October; 14:00	Report	E. Ruiz 5	**Goals**	Schuijt 3	Piscina Pere Serrat, Barcelona; Referees: Alessia Ferrari (ITA), Nikolett Sajben (HUN)

2025 European Aquatics Women's Super Cup Champions

**CN Sant Andreu**
First title

== See also ==
- 2025–26 European Aquatics Champions League
- 2025–26 European Aquatics Euro Cup
- 2025–26 European Aquatics Conference Cup
- 2025–26 European Aquatics Challenger Cup
- 2025 European Aquatics Super Cup
- 2025–26 European Aquatics Women's Champions League
- 2025–26 European Aquatics Women's Euro Cup
- 2025–26 European Aquatics Women's Conference Cup
- 2025–26 European Aquatics Women's Challenger Cup
