= San Giljan A.S.C. =

San Ġiljan ASC
- Founded: 1949; 77 years ago
- League: Maltese Waterpolo Premier League
- Based in: St. Julian's
- Arena: San Ġiljan, St. Julian's
- Colors
- President: Peter Bonavia
- Manager: Giorgios Katsaounis
- Championships: 14
- Website: http://sangiljanasc.com/

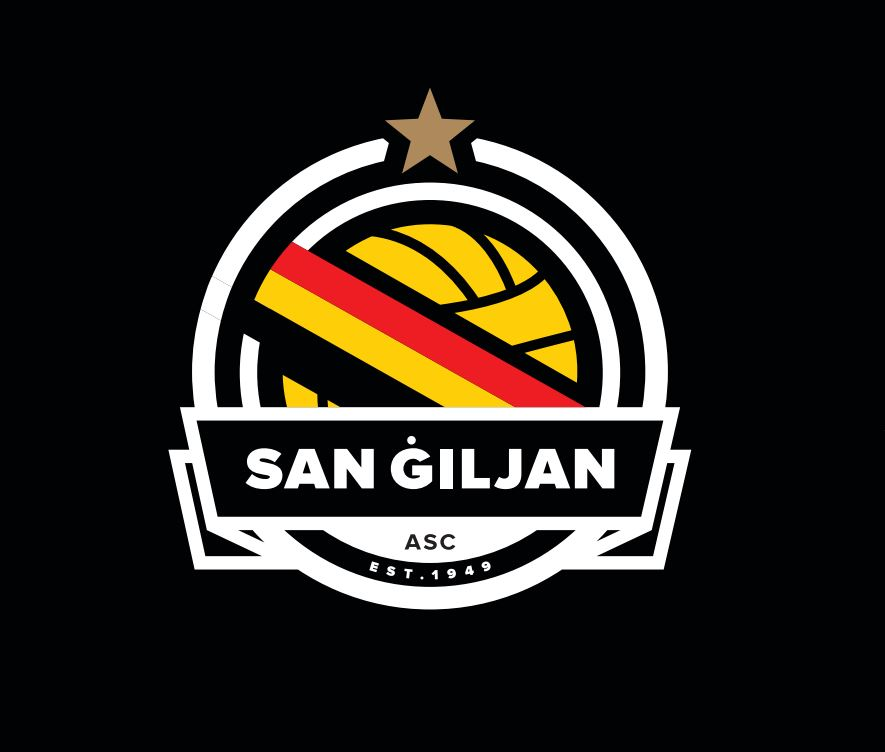
San Giljan ASC badge (2021-)

San Ġiljan Aquatic Sports Club is a waterpolo club hailing from the city of St. Julian's in Malta. The club was founded in 1949 by Ġużi Tanti, and was formerly known as Balluta, after the area of St. Julian's where the club is situated.

In 1995, San Ġiljan became the first Maltese club to win a treble, where they went unbeaten all throughout that season.

In 2015, San Ġiljan won their 9th league (and 4th double).

In 2020, San Ġiljan won their 11th league (and 6th double) finishing the season 2020 unbeaten. During this season club players Ben Plumpton and Stephanie Tanti Desjardins were nominated players of the year in male and ladies categories respectively.

In 2021, the team was runner up in the Summer League and won the knock out for the 13th time. Player Ben Plumpton was awarded the player of the year for the second year running

Season 2022 - San Giljan ASC were crowned champions for the 12th time by beating Sliema in the play-offs. The senior males also won the 14th Knock out final by beating Neptunes ASC and winning the same trophy for a record 7th time in the last 8 years. This summer the women's team managed to win the knock out trophy against Sirens and were runners up in the championship, losing by one goal in the playoff final against Sirens ASC. Goaler Jake Tanti was nominated and awarded the player of the year.

Season 2023 - Record year for the club winning all the local silverware. The club started off with winning the Enemed Cup by beating rivals Sliema 11–8. The club won also the Winter League, Presidents Cup and the BOV Knock out competition in all occasions beating Sliema WPSC in the finals. In summer the club played the playoffs against Neptunes winning both games out of three to be declared the summer champions.

Season 2024 - The club continued where it left the previous years by starting off with winning 4 trophies. The enemed cup, the BOV winter cup, the sport malta cup, and presidents cup making in 11 trophies in a row for the balluta team.

Season 2025 - 100th Anniversary of the foundation of ASA. The year started off with player Jake Bonavia winning player of the year. Jake Tanti was confirmed as goaler of the year. The club of San Giljan managed to register the trebble in this particular year winning the Winter league, Summer Knock out and the Summer league.

== Squad ==
As of 30 January 2024:

- (Malta) Matthew Zammit (captain)
- (Malta) Andreas Galea
- (Malta) Ben Plumpton
- (Australia) Aaron Younger
- (Malta) Gabriel Bonavia
- (Malta) Darren Zammit
- (Malta) Jake Tanti
- (Malta) Jake Bonavia
- (Malta) Daniel Tully
- (Malta) Dean Bugeja
- (Malta) Nico Schiavone
- (Malta) Zack Attard
- (Malta) Russel Caruana
- (Malta) Jeremy Abela
- (Malta) Nathan Bonavia
- (Malta) Shailon Cutajar

Head Coach: * (Greece) Giorgios Katsaounis Team Manager: * (Malta) Silvio Borg Physio Therapist: * (Malta) Mark Spiteri

== Honours ==
- record
- ^{s} shared record

Competition	Titles	Seasons
Summer League Premier Division	14	1952, 1958, 1963, 1965, 1966, 1992, 1994, 1995, 2015, 2017, 2020, 2022, 2023, 2025
Summer KO Premier Division	17	1952, 1959, 1961, 1963, 1968, 1993, 1995, 2015, 2016, 2017, 2018, 2020, 2021, 2022, 2023, 2025,2026
Winter League Premier Division	8	1995, 2016, 2017, 2018, 2023, 2024, 2025, 2026
Summer League First Division	9	1949, 1964 (B team), 1985, 1988, 1997, 1998, 2003, 2004, 2005
Summer KO First Division	4	1985, 1986, 2001, 2005
President's Cup	6	1996, 2016, 2017, 2018, 2023, 2024
Enemed Water Polo Cup	4^{s}	2017, 2019, 2023, 2024
Għaqda Ġurnalisti Sport Cup	2	2009, 2010
