= AVK Branik Maribor =

Slovenian water polo club

Branik Maribor
- Founded: 1992; 34 years ago
- League: Slovenian Championship
- Arena: Kopališče Pristan, Maribor
- Colors: Purple, white
- President: Marko Grujič
- Head coach: Nikica Gulin
- Championships: 3 Slovenian Championships; 1 Slovenian Cup; 1 Alpe Waterpolo League

Akademski vaterpolski klub Branik Maribor (English: Academic Water Polo Club Branik Maribor) or simply Branik is a water polo club from Maribor, Slovenia, that competes in the Slovenian Championship. The club was founded in 1992 and plays its home matches at Kopališče Pristan.

== Honours ==
=== Domestic ===
- Slovenian Championship
  - Winners (3): 2013–14, 2024–25, 2025–26
  - Runners-up (4): 1997–98, 2002–03, 2004–05, 2023–24
- Slovenian Cup
  - Winners (1): 2013
  - Runners-up (1): 2003

=== Regional ===
- Alpe Adria League
  - Runners-up (1): 2006–07
- Alpe Waterpolo League
  - Winners (1): 2025–26
