= Roko =

Roko may refer to:

- Roko (given name), a Croatian masculine name
- Amy Roko, stage name of a Saudi Arabian comedian
- Nasoni Roko, Fijian rugby union player
- Roko (title), a title of chiefly rank used in Fiji
- ROKO Construction Company, a civil engineering and construction company based in Uganda
- Roko Aero aircraft builders in Zlin, Czech Republic, the makers of the Roko Aero NG4

== See also ==
- Roko's basilisk, a hypothetical future artificial intelligence posited in a thought experiment by LessWrong contributor Roko
