= 2025–26 European Aquatics Euro Cup group stage =

Tournament information
- Sport: Water polo
- Date: 16 October 2025 – 12 February 2026
- Teams: 16
- Website: Official website

Tournament statistics
- Matches played: 48

The 2025–26 European Aquatics Euro Cup group stage is played between 16 October 2025 and 12 February 2026 to determine the eight teams advancing to the Eighth finals of the 2025–26 European Aquatics Euro Cup.

== Format ==
The 16 teams were place into four groups of four. In each group, teams will play against each other home-and-away in a round-robin format. The top two teams in each group advanced to the Eighth finals.

Teams are ranked according to points (3 points for a win, 2 points for a penalty shootout win, 1 point for a penalty shootout loss, 0 points for a loss), and if tied on points, the following tiebreaking criteria are applied, in the order given, to determine the rankings:

- Points in head-to-head matches among tied teams;
- Goal difference in head-to-head matches among tied teams;
- Goals scored in head-to-head matches among tied teams;
- Goal difference in all group matches;
- Goals scored in all group matches.

== Draw ==
External videos
- 2025–26 European Aquatics Euro Cup group stage – Draw
- Draw

The draw took place on the 28 July 2025 in Zagreb, Croatia. The nine teams in pot 1 finished third in their respective national leagues, while the 7 teams that advanced from the qualification round are in pot 2. Teams in bold indicate who advanced.

Pot 1	Pot 2
(Italy) **RN Savona** (Hungary) **BVSC Manna ABC** (Spain) **CN Barcelona** (Serbia) **VK Šabac** (Greece) **Panathinaikos** (Croatia) **Jug AO Dubrovnik** (Germany) ASC Duisburg (Montenegro) PVK Budućnost Podgorica (Romania) CS Dinamo București	(Germany) Spandau 04 (Italy) Pallanuoto Trieste (Greece) NC Vouliagmeni (Croatia) VK Solaris Šibenik (Romania) Steaua București (Spain) **CN Terrassa** (Hungary) **Szolnoki Dozsa Praktiker**

== Groups ==
=== Group A ===
Pos	Team	Pld	W	PSW	PSL	L	GF	GA	GD	Pts	Qualification	JUG	TER	SOL	DUI
1	(Croatia) Jug AO Dubrovnik	6	6	0	0	0	80	53	+27	**18**	Eighth-finals	—	16–12	12–10	19–10
2	(Spain) CN Terrassa	6	4	0	0	2	72	71	+1	**12**	Eighth-finals	12–15	—	16–12	14–13
3	(Croatia) VK Solaris Šibenik	6	1	0	0	5	65	70	−5	**3 (Note: VK Solaris Šibenik 28–24 ASC Duisburg)**		9–16	15–18	—	15–10
4	(Germany) ASC Duisburg	6	1	0	0	5	56	79	−23	**3**		9–18	13–14	14–13	—

Source: European Aquatics Euro Cup
Notes:

16 October 2025; 19:00	Report	**Jug AO Dubrovnik** (Croatia)	**16**–12	(Spain) CN Terrassa	Bazen u Gružu, Dubrovnik; Referees: Peter De Jong (NED), Norbert Ercse (HUN)
16 October 2025; 19:00	Report	Score by quarters: **4**–1, 3–**4**, **5**–3, 4–4			Bazen u Gružu, Dubrovnik; Referees: Peter De Jong (NED), Norbert Ercse (HUN)
16 October 2025; 19:00	Report	Šušić 4	**Goals**	Bargalló 5	Bazen u Gružu, Dubrovnik; Referees: Peter De Jong (NED), Norbert Ercse (HUN)

16 October 2025; 19:30	Report	**VK Solaris Šibenik** (Croatia)	**15**–10	(Germany) ASC Duisburg	Bazen Crnica, Šibenik; Referees: Nikolaos Boudramis (GRE), Frank Adam (HUN)
16 October 2025; 19:30	Report	Score by quarters: 2–**3**, 5–5, **5**–0, **3**–2			Bazen Crnica, Šibenik; Referees: Nikolaos Boudramis (GRE), Frank Adam (HUN)
16 October 2025; 19:30	Report	Zvono 4	**Goals**	Seifert, Simić 3	Bazen Crnica, Šibenik; Referees: Nikolaos Boudramis (GRE), Frank Adam (HUN)

30 October 2025; 19:30	Report	ASC Duisburg (Germany)	9–**18**	(Croatia) **Jug AO Dubrovnik**	Duisberg Sports Park, Duisburg; Referees: Daniele Bianco (ITA), Mihnea Alexandrescu (ROU)
30 October 2025; 19:30	Report	Score by quarters: 4–**7**, 1–**5**, **3**–2, 1–**4**			Duisberg Sports Park, Duisburg; Referees: Daniele Bianco (ITA), Mihnea Alexandrescu (ROU)
30 October 2025; 19:30	Report	Metten, Simić 3	**Goals**	Žuvela 5	Duisberg Sports Park, Duisburg; Referees: Daniele Bianco (ITA), Mihnea Alexandrescu (ROU)

30 October 2025; 20:30	Report	**CN Terrassa** (Spain)	**16**–12	(Croatia) VK Solaris Šibenik	Àrea Olímpica, Terrassa; Referees: Mirko Schiavo (ITA), Rajmund Fodor (HUN)
30 October 2025; 20:30	Report	Score by quarters: **4**–2, **6**–1, **5**–4, 1–**5**			Àrea Olímpica, Terrassa; Referees: Mirko Schiavo (ITA), Rajmund Fodor (HUN)
30 October 2025; 20:30	Report	Ten Broek 4	**Goals**	Čubranić, Pelicarić 4	Àrea Olímpica, Terrassa; Referees: Mirko Schiavo (ITA), Rajmund Fodor (HUN)

13 November 2025; 18:30	Report	**Jug AO Dubrovnik** (Croatia)	**12**–10	(Croatia) VK Solaris Šibenik	Bazen u Gružu, Dubrovnik; Referees: Alessandro Severo (ITA), Christos Kourtidis (GRE)
13 November 2025; 18:30	Report	Score by quarters: **4**–1, **3**–2, 3–**5**, 2–2			Bazen u Gružu, Dubrovnik; Referees: Alessandro Severo (ITA), Christos Kourtidis (GRE)
13 November 2025; 18:30	Report	Pavlić 4	**Goals**	Brajković 3	Bazen u Gružu, Dubrovnik; Referees: Alessandro Severo (ITA), Christos Kourtidis (GRE)

13 November 2025; 20:30	Report	**CN Terrassa** (Spain)	**14**–13	(Germany) ASC Duisburg	Àrea Olímpica, Terrassa; Referees: Michiel Zwart (NED), Bogdan Beljin (SRB)
13 November 2025; 20:30	Report	Score by quarters: **3**–1, **5**–1, 2–**6**, 4–**5**			Àrea Olímpica, Terrassa; Referees: Michiel Zwart (NED), Bogdan Beljin (SRB)
13 November 2025; 20:30	Report	three players 3	**Goals**	Seifert 7	Àrea Olímpica, Terrassa; Referees: Michiel Zwart (NED), Bogdan Beljin (SRB)

20 November 2025; 19:30	Report	**ASC Duisburg** (Germany)	**14**–13	(Croatia) VK Solaris Šibenik	Duisberg Sports Park, Duisburg; Referees: Mihai Balanescu (ROU), Spyridon Achladiotis (GRE)
20 November 2025; 19:30	Report	Score by quarters: 4–**6**, 2–2, **3**–0, 5–5			Duisberg Sports Park, Duisburg; Referees: Mihai Balanescu (ROU), Spyridon Achladiotis (GRE)
20 November 2025; 19:30	Report	Metten, Simić 4	**Goals**	Bajić, Vlahović 3	Duisberg Sports Park, Duisburg; Referees: Mihai Balanescu (ROU), Spyridon Achladiotis (GRE)

20 November 2025; 20:30	Report	CN Terrassa (Spain)	12–**15**	(Croatia) **Jug AO Dubrovnik**	Àrea Olímpica, Terrassa; Referees: Gyorgy Kun (HUN), Michail Birakis (GRE)
20 November 2025; 20:30	Report	Score by quarters: 3–3, **3**–2, 4–**5**, 2–**5**			Àrea Olímpica, Terrassa; Referees: Gyorgy Kun (HUN), Michail Birakis (GRE)
20 November 2025; 20:30	Report	Blasco 3	**Goals**	Joković, Žuvela 5	Àrea Olímpica, Terrassa; Referees: Gyorgy Kun (HUN), Michail Birakis (GRE)

4 December 2025; 19:00	Report	**Jug AO Dubrovnik** (Croatia)	**19**–10	(Germany) ASC Duisburg	Bazen u Gružu, Dubrovnik; Referees: Alexandros Chatzigoulas (GRE), Sander Gransjean (NED)
4 December 2025; 19:00	Report	Score by quarters: **7**–3, **5**–2, **4**–2, 3–3			Bazen u Gružu, Dubrovnik; Referees: Alexandros Chatzigoulas (GRE), Sander Gransjean (NED)
4 December 2025; 19:00	Report	Žuvela 6	**Goals**	Seifert 4	Bazen u Gružu, Dubrovnik; Referees: Alexandros Chatzigoulas (GRE), Sander Gransjean (NED)

4 December 2025; 20:30	Report	VK Solaris Šibenik (Croatia)	15–**18**	(Spain) **CN Terrassa**	Bazen Crnica, Šibenik; Referees: Raffaele Colombo (ITA), Norbert Ersce (HUN)
4 December 2025; 20:30	Report	Score by quarters: **4**–3, 3–**7**, **5**–4, 3–**4**			Bazen Crnica, Šibenik; Referees: Raffaele Colombo (ITA), Norbert Ersce (HUN)
4 December 2025; 20:30	Report	Pelicarić 6	**Goals**	Sabadell Porcar, Ten Broek 5	Bazen Crnica, Šibenik; Referees: Raffaele Colombo (ITA), Norbert Ersce (HUN)

12 February 2026; 19:30	Report	ASC Duisburg (Germany)	13–**14**	(Spain) **CN Terrassa**	Duisberg Sports Park, Duisburg; Referees: Mihai Balanescu (ROU), Tomi Kavcic (SLO)
12 February 2026; 19:30	Report	Score by quarters: 2–**3**, 0–**4**, **6**–3, **5**–4			Duisberg Sports Park, Duisburg; Referees: Mihai Balanescu (ROU), Tomi Kavcic (SLO)
12 February 2026; 19:30	Report	Simić 6	**Goals**	Ten Broek 4	Duisberg Sports Park, Duisburg; Referees: Mihai Balanescu (ROU), Tomi Kavcic (SLO)

12 February 2026; 20:30	Report	VK Solaris Šibenik (Croatia)	9–**16**	(Croatia) **Jug AO Dubrovnik**	Bazen Crnica, Šibenik; Referees: Alessia Ferrari (ITA), Spyridon Achladiotis (GRE)
12 February 2026; 20:30	Report	Score by quarters: 3–**5**, 4–4, 1–**3**, 1–**4**			Bazen Crnica, Šibenik; Referees: Alessia Ferrari (ITA), Spyridon Achladiotis (GRE)
12 February 2026; 20:30	Report	Pelicarić 5	**Goals**	Žuvela 5	Bazen Crnica, Šibenik; Referees: Alessia Ferrari (ITA), Spyridon Achladiotis (GRE)

=== Group B ===
Pos	Team	Pld	W	PSW	PSL	L	GF	GA	GD	Pts	Qualification	SZO	BAR	TRI	DIN
1	(Hungary) Szolnoki Dozsa-Praktiker	6	5	0	0	1	89	76	+13	**15**	Eighth-finals	—	10–14	16–14	16–9
2	(Spain) CN Barcelona	6	4	0	0	2	102	79	+23	**12**	Eighth-finals	12–16	—	19–12	22–11
3	(Italy) Pallanuoto Trieste	6	3	0	0	3	91	97	−6	**9**		12–15	20–16	—	17–16
4	(Romania) CS Dinamo București	6	0	0	0	6	76	106	−30	**0**		15–16	10–19	15–16	—

Source: European Aquatics Euro Cup

16 October 2025; 20:00	Report	**Pallanuoto Trieste** (Italy)	**20**–16	(Spain) CN Barcelona	Bruno Bianchi Swimming Center, Trieste; Referees: Andrej Franulović (CRO), Spyridon Achladiotis (GRE)
16 October 2025; 20:00	Report	Score by quarters: **6**–5, **7**–2, 4–**5**, 3–**4**			Bruno Bianchi Swimming Center, Trieste; Referees: Andrej Franulović (CRO), Spyridon Achladiotis (GRE)
16 October 2025; 20:00	Report	Drašković, Mezzarobba 5	**Goals**	Daura Gomez 4	Bruno Bianchi Swimming Center, Trieste; Referees: Andrej Franulović (CRO), Spyridon Achladiotis (GRE)

16 October 2025; 20:30	Report	CS Dinamo București (Romania)	15–**16**	(Hungary) **Szolnoki Dozsa-Praktiker**	Bazinul Anatolie Grinţescu, Bucharest; Referees: Vuk Milovic (SRB), Hendrik Schopp (GER)
16 October 2025; 20:30	Report	Score by quarters: 4–**7**, **4**–3, 3–**4**, **4**–2			Bazinul Anatolie Grinţescu, Bucharest; Referees: Vuk Milovic (SRB), Hendrik Schopp (GER)
16 October 2025; 20:30	Report	Lutescu 5	**Goals**	Zerinváry 4	Bazinul Anatolie Grinţescu, Bucharest; Referees: Vuk Milovic (SRB), Hendrik Schopp (GER)

30 October 2025; 18:00	Report	**Szolnoki Dozsa-Praktiker** (Hungary)	**16**–14	(Italy) Pallanuoto Trieste	Szolnok Water Polo Arena, Szolnok; Referees: Christos Kourtidis (GRE), Sinisa Matijasevic (MNE)
30 October 2025; 18:00	Report	Score by quarters: **4**–3, **3**–2, 3–**4**, **6**–5			Szolnok Water Polo Arena, Szolnok; Referees: Christos Kourtidis (GRE), Sinisa Matijasevic (MNE)
30 October 2025; 18:00	Report	Kovács 4	**Goals**	Drašković 6	Szolnok Water Polo Arena, Szolnok; Referees: Christos Kourtidis (GRE), Sinisa Matijasevic (MNE)

30 October 2025; 20:00	Report	**CN Barcelona** (Spain)	**22**–11	(Romania) CS Dinamo București	Nova Escullera Sport Center, Barcelona; Referees: Jakov Blaskovic (CRO), Alexandros Chatzigoulas (GRE)
30 October 2025; 20:00	Report	Score by quarters: **5**–2, **5**–2, **7**–2, 5–5			Nova Escullera Sport Center, Barcelona; Referees: Jakov Blaskovic (CRO), Alexandros Chatzigoulas (GRE)
30 October 2025; 20:00	Report	van der Weijden 5	**Goals**	Prioteasa 6	Nova Escullera Sport Center, Barcelona; Referees: Jakov Blaskovic (CRO), Alexandros Chatzigoulas (GRE)

13 November 2025; 18:00	Report	Szolnoki Dozsa-Praktiker (Hungary)	10–**14**	(Spain) **CN Barcelona**	Szolnok Water Polo Arena, Szolnok; Referees: Nikolaos Boudramis (GRE), Stanko Ivanovski (MNE)
13 November 2025; 18:00	Report	Score by quarters: **2**–0, 2–**4**, 1–**6**, **5**–4			Szolnok Water Polo Arena, Szolnok; Referees: Nikolaos Boudramis (GRE), Stanko Ivanovski (MNE)
13 November 2025; 18:00	Report	Cseh 3	**Goals**	Daura Gomez 4	Szolnok Water Polo Arena, Szolnok; Referees: Nikolaos Boudramis (GRE), Stanko Ivanovski (MNE)

13 November 2025; 20:00	Report	**Pallanuoto Trieste** (Italy)	**17**–16	(Romania) CS Dinamo București	Bruno Bianchi Swimming Center, Trieste; Referees: Vlaho Radicevic (CRO), Maxim Gerasimov (GBR)
13 November 2025; 20:00	Report	Score by quarters: 4–4, **5**–2, 3–**7**, **5**–3			Bruno Bianchi Swimming Center, Trieste; Referees: Vlaho Radicevic (CRO), Maxim Gerasimov (GBR)
13 November 2025; 20:00	Report	Cagalj, Drašković 4	**Goals**	Prioteasa 6	Bruno Bianchi Swimming Center, Trieste; Referees: Vlaho Radicevic (CRO), Maxim Gerasimov (GBR)

20 November 2025; 18:00	Report	**Szolnoki Dozsa-Praktiker** (Hungary)	**16**–9	(Romania) CS Dinamo București	Szolnok Water Polo Arena, Szolnok; Referees: Veselin Miskovic (MNE), Erkan Turkkan (TUR)
20 November 2025; 18:00	Report	Score by quarters: 3–3, **5**–1, **5**–1, 3–**4**			Szolnok Water Polo Arena, Szolnok; Referees: Veselin Miskovic (MNE), Erkan Turkkan (TUR)
20 November 2025; 18:00	Report	Cseh 4	**Goals**	Radu 4	Szolnok Water Polo Arena, Szolnok; Referees: Veselin Miskovic (MNE), Erkan Turkkan (TUR)

20 November 2025; 20:00	Report	**CN Barcelona** (Spain)	**19**–12	(Italy) Pallanuoto Trieste	Nova Escullera Sport Center, Barcelona; Referees: Ante Bura (CRO), Julien Bourges (FRA)
20 November 2025; 20:00	Report	Score by quarters: **6**–5, **5**–3, **4**–2, **4**–2			Nova Escullera Sport Center, Barcelona; Referees: Ante Bura (CRO), Julien Bourges (FRA)
20 November 2025; 20:00	Report	Daura Gomez, Gomà Esforzado 4	**Goals**	Drašković 4	Nova Escullera Sport Center, Barcelona; Referees: Ante Bura (CRO), Julien Bourges (FRA)

4 December 2025; 20:00	Report	Pallanuoto Trieste (Italy)	12–**15**	(Hungary) **Szolnoki Dozsa-Praktiker**	Bruno Bianchi Swimming Center, Trieste; Referees: Levan Berishvili (GEO), Ivan Rakovic (SRB)
4 December 2025; 20:00	Report	Score by quarters: 4–4, 3–**5**, 3–3, 2–**3**			Bruno Bianchi Swimming Center, Trieste; Referees: Levan Berishvili (GEO), Ivan Rakovic (SRB)
4 December 2025; 20:00	Report	Drašković 4	**Goals**	Bendegúz, Cseh 3	Bruno Bianchi Swimming Center, Trieste; Referees: Levan Berishvili (GEO), Ivan Rakovic (SRB)

4 December 2025; 20:30	Report	CS Dinamo București (Romania)	10–**19**	(Spain) **CN Barcelona**	Bazinul Anatolie Grinţescu, Bucharest; Referees: Stanko Ivanovski (MNE), Bogdan Beljin (SRB)
4 December 2025; 20:30	Report	Score by quarters: 2–**4**, 3–**4**, 3–**6**, 2–**5**			Bazinul Anatolie Grinţescu, Bucharest; Referees: Stanko Ivanovski (MNE), Bogdan Beljin (SRB)
4 December 2025; 20:30	Report	Chikovani 4	**Goals**	four players 3	Bazinul Anatolie Grinţescu, Bucharest; Referees: Stanko Ivanovski (MNE), Bogdan Beljin (SRB)

12 February 2026; 20:00	Report	CN Barcelona (Spain)	12–**16**	(Hungary) **Szolnoki Dozsa-Praktiker**	Nova Escullera Sport Center, Barcelona; Referees: Frank Ohme (GER), Christos Kourtidis (GRE)
12 February 2026; 20:00	Report	Score by quarters: 2–2, 2–**4**, 3–**5**, 5–5			Nova Escullera Sport Center, Barcelona; Referees: Frank Ohme (GER), Christos Kourtidis (GRE)
12 February 2026; 20:00	Report	four players 2	**Goals**	Szabó 5	Nova Escullera Sport Center, Barcelona; Referees: Frank Ohme (GER), Christos Kourtidis (GRE)

12 February 2026; 20:30	Report	CS Dinamo București (Romania)	15–**16**	(Italy) **Pallanuoto Trieste**	Bazinul Anatolie Grinţescu, Bucharest; Referees: Gernot Haentschel (GER), Maro Savinovic (CRO)
12 February 2026; 20:30	Report	Score by quarters: 2–**4**, **5**–4, **6**–4, 2–**4**			Bazinul Anatolie Grinţescu, Bucharest; Referees: Gernot Haentschel (GER), Maro Savinovic (CRO)
12 February 2026; 20:30	Report	Negus, Prioteasa 4	**Goals**	Marziali 4	Bazinul Anatolie Grinţescu, Bucharest; Referees: Gernot Haentschel (GER), Maro Savinovic (CRO)

=== Group C ===
Pos	Team	Pld	W	PSW	PSL	L	GF	GA	GD	Pts	Qualification	BVSC	PAN	VOU	BUD
1	(Hungary) BVSC-Manna ABC	6	3	1	2	0	111	90	+21	**13**	Eighth-finals	—	13–10	23–22 (Note: Match finished 13–13. NC Vouliagmeni won 9–8 on penalties.)	20–9
2	(Greece) Panathinaikos	6	3	1	1	1	91	77	+14	**12**	Eighth-finals	21–18 (Note: Match finished 17–17. Panathinaikos won 4–1 on penalties.)	—	16–17 (Note: Match finished 10–10. NC Vouliagmeni won 7–6 on penalties.)	16–8
3	(Greece) NC Vouliagmeni	6	2	2	1	1	107	88	+19	**11**		20–19 (Note: Match finished 13–13. BVSC-Manna ABC won 10–9 on penalties.)	12–14	—	19–9
4	(Montenegro) PVK Budućnost Podgorica	6	0	0	0	6	50	104	−54	**0**		8–18	9–14	7–17	—

Source: European Aquatics Euro Cup

16 October 2025; 17:00	Report	**NC Vouliagmeni** (Greece)	**20**–19 (PSO)	(Hungary) BVSC-Manna ABC	"Cyprus" Swimming Pool, Vari; Referees: Jaume Teixido Bermudez (ESP), Tomislav Copic (CRO)
16 October 2025; 17:00	Report	Score by quarters: 1–**3**, 2–2, 5–5, **3**–1 PSO: **9**–8			"Cyprus" Swimming Pool, Vari; Referees: Jaume Teixido Bermudez (ESP), Tomislav Copic (CRO)
16 October 2025; 17:00	Report	Te Riele 6	**Goals**	Benedek 5	"Cyprus" Swimming Pool, Vari; Referees: Jaume Teixido Bermudez (ESP), Tomislav Copic (CRO)

16 October 2025; 21:00	Report	**Panathinaikos** (Greece)	**16**–8	(Montenegro) PVK Budućnost Podgorica	Goudi Swimming Pool, Athens; Referees: Mirko Schiavo (ITA), MMihai Balanescu (ROU)
16 October 2025; 21:00	Report	Score by quarters: **4**–2, **4**–1, 4–4, **4**–1			Goudi Swimming Pool, Athens; Referees: Mirko Schiavo (ITA), MMihai Balanescu (ROU)
16 October 2025; 21:00	Report	Gkiouvetsis 5	**Goals**	Brguljan 4	Goudi Swimming Pool, Athens; Referees: Mirko Schiavo (ITA), MMihai Balanescu (ROU)

30 October 2025; 18:00	Report	PVK Budućnost Podgorica (Montenegro)	7–**17**	(Greece) **NC Vouliagmeni**	Morača Swimming Pool, Podgorica; Referees: Alex Marquez Mas (ESP), Ralf Mueller (GER)
30 October 2025; 18:00	Report	Score by quarters: 0–**4**, 3–3, 3–**4**, 1–**6**			Morača Swimming Pool, Podgorica; Referees: Alex Marquez Mas (ESP), Ralf Mueller (GER)
30 October 2025; 18:00	Report	three players 2	**Goals**	Te Riele 5	Morača Swimming Pool, Podgorica; Referees: Alex Marquez Mas (ESP), Ralf Mueller (GER)

30 October 2025; 18:30	Report	**BVSC-Manna ABC** (Hungary)	**13**–10	(Greece) Panathinaikos	Laky Károly Swimming Pool, Budapest; Referees: David Gomez Pordomingo (ESP), Andreja Stanojevic (SRB)
30 October 2025; 18:30	Report	Score by quarters: 2–**3**, 2–**5**, **5**–0, **4**–2			Laky Károly Swimming Pool, Budapest; Referees: David Gomez Pordomingo (ESP), Andreja Stanojevic (SRB)
30 October 2025; 18:30	Report	Shushiashvili 4	**Goals**	Chalyvopoulos 4	Laky Károly Swimming Pool, Budapest; Referees: David Gomez Pordomingo (ESP), Andreja Stanojevic (SRB)

13 November 2025; 18:00	Report	PVK Budućnost Podgorica (Montenegro)	8–**18**	(Hungary) **BVSC-Manna ABC**	Morača Swimming Pool, Podgorica; Referees: Arnaldo Petronilli (ITA), Mihai Balanescu (ROU)
13 November 2025; 18:00	Report	Score by quarters: 3–**4**, 2–**6**, 3–**5**, 0–**3**			Morača Swimming Pool, Podgorica; Referees: Arnaldo Petronilli (ITA), Mihai Balanescu (ROU)
13 November 2025; 18:00	Report	Stevović 3	**Goals**	Shushiashvili 5	Morača Swimming Pool, Podgorica; Referees: Arnaldo Petronilli (ITA), Mihai Balanescu (ROU)

13 November 2025; 21:30	Report	Panathinaikos (Greece)	16–**17** (PSO)	(Greece) **NC Vouliagmeni**	Goudi Swimming Pool, Athens; Referees: Andrej Franulovic (CRO), Vuk Milovic (SRB)
13 November 2025; 21:30	Report	Score by quarters: 5–**6**, 2–2, **2**–1, 1–1 PSO: 6–**7**			Goudi Swimming Pool, Athens; Referees: Andrej Franulovic (CRO), Vuk Milovic (SRB)
13 November 2025; 21:30	Report	Gkiouvetsis 4	**Goals**	Chatzis 4	Goudi Swimming Pool, Athens; Referees: Andrej Franulovic (CRO), Vuk Milovic (SRB)

20 November 2025; 18:00	Report	PVK Budućnost Podgorica (Montenegro)	9–**14**	(Greece) **Panathinaikos**	Morača Swimming Pool, Podgorica; Referees: Massimo Calabro (ITA), Peter Radic (SVK)
20 November 2025; 18:00	Report	Score by quarters: 1–**3**, 1–**6**, 2–2, **5**–3			Morača Swimming Pool, Podgorica; Referees: Massimo Calabro (ITA), Peter Radic (SVK)
20 November 2025; 18:00	Report	Brguljan 4	**Goals**	Chalyvopoulos, Kopeliadis 4	Morača Swimming Pool, Podgorica; Referees: Massimo Calabro (ITA), Peter Radic (SVK)

20 November 2025; 18:30	Report	**BVSC-Manna ABC** (Hungary)	**23**–22 (PSO)	(Greece) NC Vouliagmeni	Laky Károly Swimming Pool, Budapest; Referees: Vojin Putnikovic (SRB), Raffaele Colombo (ITA)
20 November 2025; 18:30	Report	Score by quarters: 3–3, 3–3, 4–**5**, **3**–2 PSO: **10**–9			Laky Károly Swimming Pool, Budapest; Referees: Vojin Putnikovic (SRB), Raffaele Colombo (ITA)
20 November 2025; 18:30	Report	Zsombor 4	**Goals**	Kastrinakis, Troulos 3	Laky Károly Swimming Pool, Budapest; Referees: Vojin Putnikovic (SRB), Raffaele Colombo (ITA)

4 December 2025; 13:30	Report	**NC Vouliagmeni** (Greece)	**19**–9	(Montenegro) PVK Budućnost Podgorica	"Cyprus" Swimming Pool, Vari; Referees: Gernot Haentschel (GER), Minhea Alexandrescu (ROU)
4 December 2025; 13:30	Report	Score by quarters: **4**–3, 3–3, **6**–2, **6**–1			"Cyprus" Swimming Pool, Vari; Referees: Gernot Haentschel (GER), Minhea Alexandrescu (ROU)
4 December 2025; 13:30	Report	Troulos 6	**Goals**	Bošković 3	"Cyprus" Swimming Pool, Vari; Referees: Gernot Haentschel (GER), Minhea Alexandrescu (ROU)

4 December 2025; 21:30	Report	**Panathinaikos** (Greece)	**21**–18 (PSO)	(Hungary) BVSC-Manna ABC	Goudi Swimming Pool, Athens; Referees: Francesc Xavier Buch Juanola (ESP), Daniele Bianco (ITA)
4 December 2025; 21:30	Report	Score by quarters: **5**–4, 2–**4**, **7**–6, 3–3 PSO: **4**–1			Goudi Swimming Pool, Athens; Referees: Francesc Xavier Buch Juanola (ESP), Daniele Bianco (ITA)
4 December 2025; 21:30	Report	Papanikolaou 6	**Goals**	Tátrai 3	Goudi Swimming Pool, Athens; Referees: Francesc Xavier Buch Juanola (ESP), Daniele Bianco (ITA)

12 February 2026; 15:00	Report	NC Vouliagmeni (Greece)	12–**14**	(Greece) **Panathinaikos**	"Cyprus" Swimming Pool, Vari; Referees: Vojin Putnikovic (SRB), Daniele Bianco (ITA)
12 February 2026; 15:00	Report	Score by quarters: **4**–3, 3–**5**, 1–**3**, **4**–3			"Cyprus" Swimming Pool, Vari; Referees: Vojin Putnikovic (SRB), Daniele Bianco (ITA)
12 February 2026; 15:00	Report	three players 3	**Goals**	Gkiouvetsis 4	"Cyprus" Swimming Pool, Vari; Referees: Vojin Putnikovic (SRB), Daniele Bianco (ITA)

12 February 2026; 18:30	Report	**BVSC-Manna ABC** (Hungary)	**20**–9	(Montenegro) PVK Budućnost Podgorica	Laky Károly Swimming Pool, Budapest; Referees: Aurely Bouchez (FRA), Juan Carlos Ezponda Colominas (ESP)
12 February 2026; 18:30	Report	Score by quarters: **4**–3, **4**–2, **6**–1, **6**–3			Laky Károly Swimming Pool, Budapest; Referees: Aurely Bouchez (FRA), Juan Carlos Ezponda Colominas (ESP)
12 February 2026; 18:30	Report	Benedek, Tátrai 4	**Goals**	Brguljan 5	Laky Károly Swimming Pool, Budapest; Referees: Aurely Bouchez (FRA), Juan Carlos Ezponda Colominas (ESP)

=== Group D ===
Pos	Team	Pld	W	PSW	PSL	L	GF	GA	GD	Pts	Qualification	SAV	SAB	SPA	STE
1	(Italy) RN Savona	6	4	0	1	1	86	78	+8	**13**	Eighth-finals	—	17–12	17–11	16–17 (Note: Match ended 13–13. Steaua București won 4–3 on penalties.)
2	(Serbia) VK Šabac	6	4	0	0	2	67	68	−1	**12**	Eighth-finals	13–9	—	11–8	11–9
3	(Germany) Spandau 04	6	3	0	0	3	76	75	+1	**9**		15–16	18–12	—	13–10
4	(Romania) Steaua București	6	0	1	0	5	62	70	−8	**2**		10–11	7–8	9–11	—

Source: European Aquatics Euro Cup

16 October 2025; 19:00	Report	Spandau 04 (Germany)	15–**16**	(Italy) **RN Savona**	Schöneberg Swimming Hall, Berlin; Referees: Stanko Ivanovski (MNE), Pau Segurana Ferre (ESP)
16 October 2025; 19:00	Report	Score by quarters: **4**–3, 2–2, 4–**6**, 5–5			Schöneberg Swimming Hall, Berlin; Referees: Stanko Ivanovski (MNE), Pau Segurana Ferre (ESP)
16 October 2025; 19:00	Report	Čaraj, Nagy 3	**Goals**	Bruni 5	Schöneberg Swimming Hall, Berlin; Referees: Stanko Ivanovski (MNE), Pau Segurana Ferre (ESP)

16 October 2025; 20:00	Report	**VK Šabac** (Serbia)	**11**–9	(Romania) Steaua București	Šabac City Swimming Pool, Šabac; Referees: Rik Evers (NED), Tomi Kavcic (SLO)
16 October 2025; 20:00	Report	Score by quarters: **4**–3, 2–2, **2**–1, 3–3			Šabac City Swimming Pool, Šabac; Referees: Rik Evers (NED), Tomi Kavcic (SLO)
16 October 2025; 20:00	Report	Stojanović 4	**Goals**	Vučinić 3	Šabac City Swimming Pool, Šabac; Referees: Rik Evers (NED), Tomi Kavcic (SLO)

30 October 2025; 19:00	Report	Steaua București (Romania)	9–**11**	(Germany) **Spandau 04**	Complexul Sportiv Steaua, Bucharest; Referees: Ante Bura (CRO), Ruben Garcia (SUI)
30 October 2025; 19:00	Report	Score by quarters: 2–**5**, **2**–1, 2–2, 3–3			Complexul Sportiv Steaua, Bucharest; Referees: Ante Bura (CRO), Ruben Garcia (SUI)
30 October 2025; 19:00	Report	Eulea 3	**Goals**	Nagy 3	Complexul Sportiv Steaua, Bucharest; Referees: Ante Bura (CRO), Ruben Garcia (SUI)

30 October 2025; 19:00	Report	**RN Savona** (Italy)	**17**–12	(Serbia) VK Šabac	Piscina Carlo Zanelli, Savona; Referees: Gyorgy Kun (HUN), Julien Bourges (FRA)
30 October 2025; 19:00	Report	Score by quarters: 4–**5**, 3–**4**, **4**–2, **6**–1			Piscina Carlo Zanelli, Savona; Referees: Gyorgy Kun (HUN), Julien Bourges (FRA)
30 October 2025; 19:00	Report	Leinweber 5	**Goals**	Toholj 3	Piscina Carlo Zanelli, Savona; Referees: Gyorgy Kun (HUN), Julien Bourges (FRA)

13 November 2025; 20:00	Report	Steaua București (Romania)	10–**11**	(Italy) **RN Savona**	Complexul Sportiv Steaua, Bucharest; Referees: Pau Segurana Ferre (ESP), Norbert Ersce (HUN)
13 November 2025; 20:00	Report	Score by quarters: 3–**4**, 1–**4**, **4**–1, 2–2			Complexul Sportiv Steaua, Bucharest; Referees: Pau Segurana Ferre (ESP), Norbert Ersce (HUN)
13 November 2025; 20:00	Report	three players 2	**Goals**	Leinweber 4	Complexul Sportiv Steaua, Bucharest; Referees: Pau Segurana Ferre (ESP), Norbert Ersce (HUN)

13 November 2025; 20:00	Report	**VK Šabac** (Serbia)	**11**–8	(Germany) Spandau 04	Šabac City Swimming Pool, Šabac; Referees: Alex Marquez Mas (ESP), Rajmund Fodor (HUN)
13 November 2025; 20:00	Report	Score by quarters: **3**–2, **4**–1, 1–1, 3–**4**			Šabac City Swimming Pool, Šabac; Referees: Alex Marquez Mas (ESP), Rajmund Fodor (HUN)
13 November 2025; 20:00	Report	Gavrilović, Mačić 3	**Goals**	Nagy 3	Šabac City Swimming Pool, Šabac; Referees: Alex Marquez Mas (ESP), Rajmund Fodor (HUN)

20 November 2025; 19:00	Report	Steaua București (Romania)	7–**8**	(Serbia) **VK Šabac**	Complexul Sportiv Steaua, Bucharest; Referees: Levan Berishvili (GEO), Jaume Teixido Bermudez (ESP)
20 November 2025; 19:00	Report	Score by quarters: 3–3, **2**–1, 1–**3**, 1–1			Complexul Sportiv Steaua, Bucharest; Referees: Levan Berishvili (GEO), Jaume Teixido Bermudez (ESP)
20 November 2025; 19:00	Report	Georgescu 3	**Goals**	three players 2	Complexul Sportiv Steaua, Bucharest; Referees: Levan Berishvili (GEO), Jaume Teixido Bermudez (ESP)

20 November 2025; 19:00	Report	**RN Savona** (Italy)	**17**–11	(Germany) Spandau 04	Piscina Carlo Zanelli, Savona; Referees: Tamás Kovács-Csatlós (HUN), David Gomez Pordomingo (ESP)
20 November 2025; 19:00	Report	Score by quarters: **5**–2, **4**–2, **3**–1, 5–**6**			Piscina Carlo Zanelli, Savona; Referees: Tamás Kovács-Csatlós (HUN), David Gomez Pordomingo (ESP)
20 November 2025; 19:00	Report	Leinweber 4	**Goals**	Nagy 4	Piscina Carlo Zanelli, Savona; Referees: Tamás Kovács-Csatlós (HUN), David Gomez Pordomingo (ESP)

4 December 2025; 19:00	Report	**Spandau 04** (Germany)	**13**–10	(Romania) Steaua București	Schöneberg Swimming Hall, Berlin; Referees: Maro Savinovic (CRO), Frank Adam (HUN)
4 December 2025; 19:00	Report	Score by quarters: 4–4, **3**–1, 2–2, **4**–3			Schöneberg Swimming Hall, Berlin; Referees: Maro Savinovic (CRO), Frank Adam (HUN)
4 December 2025; 19:00	Report	Kojic 4	**Goals**	Georgescu 3	Schöneberg Swimming Hall, Berlin; Referees: Maro Savinovic (CRO), Frank Adam (HUN)

4 December 2025; 20:00	Report	**VK Šabac** (Serbia)	**13**–9	(Italy) RN Savona	Šabac City Swimming Pool, Šabac; Referees: Michael Birakis (GRE), Sergio Jimenez Turnes (ESP)
4 December 2025; 20:00	Report	Score by quarters: **4**–1, 2–**3**, **5**–3, 2–2			Šabac City Swimming Pool, Šabac; Referees: Michael Birakis (GRE), Sergio Jimenez Turnes (ESP)
4 December 2025; 20:00	Report	Stanojević 4	**Goals**	three players 2	Šabac City Swimming Pool, Šabac; Referees: Michael Birakis (GRE), Sergio Jimenez Turnes (ESP)

12 February 2026; 19:00	Report	RN Savona (Italy)	16–**17** (PSO)	(Romania) **Steaua București**	Piscina Carlo Zanelli, Savona; Referees: Jakov Blaskovic (CRO), Sinisa Matijasevic (MNE)
12 February 2026; 19:00	Report	Score by quarters: **4**–3, 2–**3**, 2–**4**, **5**–3 PSO: 3–**4**			Piscina Carlo Zanelli, Savona; Referees: Jakov Blaskovic (CRO), Sinisa Matijasevic (MNE)
12 February 2026; 19:00	Report	Occhione 4	**Goals**	Eulea 4	Piscina Carlo Zanelli, Savona; Referees: Jakov Blaskovic (CRO), Sinisa Matijasevic (MNE)

12 February 2026; 19:00	Report	**Spandau 04** (Germany)	**18**–12	(Serbia) VK Šabac	Schöneberg Swimming Hall, Berlin; Referees: Nora Debreceni (HUN), Rik Evers (NED)
12 February 2026; 19:00	Report	Score by quarters: 3–3, **4**–1, 5–5, **6**–3			Schöneberg Swimming Hall, Berlin; Referees: Nora Debreceni (HUN), Rik Evers (NED)
12 February 2026; 19:00	Report	Kojic 5	**Goals**	four players 2	Schöneberg Swimming Hall, Berlin; Referees: Nora Debreceni (HUN), Rik Evers (NED)

== See also ==
- 2025–26 European Aquatics Champions League
- 2025–26 European Aquatics Euro Cup
- 2025–26 European Aquatics Conference Cup
- 2025–26 European Aquatics Challenger Cup
- 2025 European Aquatics Super Cup
- 2025–26 European Aquatics Women's Champions League
- 2025–26 European Aquatics Women's Euro Cup
- 2025–26 European Aquatics Women's Conference Cup
- 2025–26 European Aquatics Women's Challenger Cup
- 2025 European Aquatics Women's Super Cup

Reference
Matchday 1
Matchday 2
Matchday 3
Matchday 4
Matchday 5
Matchday 6

Reference
Matchday 1
Matchday 2
Matchday 3
Matchday 4
Matchday 5
Matchday 6
