= Aburob =

Jordanian YouTuber

Ahmad Aburob (born 1997) is a Jordanian YouTuber, digital content creator, and entrepreneur. He is best known for his Arabic-language YouTube channel Aburob, which features comedic commentary, infotainment, and storytelling videos. In 2022, Aburob was named the "Middle Eastern Social Media Star" at the 48th People's Choice Awards. He is also the founder and CEO of The Content Factory (TCF), a digital marketing and creative agency.

== Early life ==
Aburob was born in 1997 in Dubai, United Arab Emirates, and was subsequently raised in Amman, Jordan. Prior to pursuing digital media full-time, he reportedly studied and trained as an engineer.

== Career ==
=== YouTube and content creation ===
Aburob launched his YouTube channel in 2018. His early videos focused on social commentary, vlogs, and observational comedy. Over time, his content shifted towards infotainment focused on storytelling, humor, and science-based topics for Arabic-speaking audiences across the Middle East and North Africa (MENA) region.

As of early 2024, his primary channel, Aburob, has achieved over 10 million subscribers. He reportedly maintains a consistent uploading schedule and has achieved a notable presence across other social media platforms, including Instagram and TikTok.

== Public speaking ==
In early 2024, Aburob delivered a TEDx talk at TEDxAmman titled "How I Learned to Defeat My Ego." During the presentation, he discussed his personal challenges, mindset shifts regarding pride, and his journey as a digital entrepreneur.

== Media and controversies ==
=== Little St. James visit ===
In 2024, following heightened public interest in the unsealed court documents related to convicted sex offender Jeffrey Epstein, Aburob participated in a YouTube trend where content creators traveled to Epstein's former private island, Little St. James, in the U.S. Virgin Islands. Aburob published a video of himself stepping onto the island and approaching a structure commonly referred to as the "temple," which garnered over 15 million views.

The trend of influencers visiting the island was documented by NBC News. In an interview with the outlet, Aburob was candid about his motivations, stating that he filmed the video quickly because he "knew it will go viral" and that it fit his usual content style. He noted that the release of the Epstein files created a trend for YouTubers to capitalize on, adding, "As a content creator, it's your job to create a very entertaining piece. So it's okay to latch on to whatever drama you can find while doing the experience, in my opinion."

Aburob later stated he did not plan to make any further content related to Epstein, telling NBC News that he did not "want to be associated with that name," and remarked that aside from creating content, there was no reason for a normal person to visit the island.

== Awards and nominations ==
- 2022 People's Choice Awards: Aburob was voted the "Middle Eastern Social Media Star" by public vote. The awards ceremony was broadcast by E! from Santa Monica, California. He competed in a category alongside other notable regional figures, including Saudi comedian Amy Roko and travel vlogger Joe Hattab.

== Personal life ==
Ahmad Aburob is married to Saba Shamaa, who is also a Jordanian content creator and digital influencer. He resides between Amman, Jordan, and Dubai, United Arab Emirates.
