= Roko (given name) =

Roko is a Croatian masculine given name, cognate to Italian Rocco and Slovene Rok. It is related to the veneration of Saint Roch (sveti Roko).

Notable people with the name include:

- Roko Badžim (born 1997), Croatian basketball player
- Roko Baturina (born 2000), Croatian football player
- Roko Belic, an American film director, producer, cinematographer, and actor
- Roko Blažević (born 2000), Croatian singer
- Roko Glasnović (born 1978), Croatian cleric
- Roko Jureškin (born 2000), Croatian football player
- Roko Karanušić (born 1982), Croatian tennis player
- Roko Mišlov (born 1988), Croatian football player
- Roko Pelicarić (born 1998), Croatian water polo player
- Roko Prkačin (born 2002), Croatian basketball player
- Roko Strika (born 1994), Australian football player of Croatian descent
- Roko Šimić (born 2003), Croatian football player
- Roko Tošić (born 1979), Croatian table tennis player
- Roko Ukić (born 1984), Croatian basketball player
