= 2025–26 European Aquatics Euro Cup =

Water polo sports season

European Aquatics Euro Cup
- 2025–26

Tournament information
- Sport: Water polo
- Date: Qualification round: 3–5 October 2025; Group stage: 16 October 2025 – 12 February 2026; Knockout stage: 25 February – 6 June 2026
- Tournament format(s): Round Robin and Knockout stage
- Teams: Qualification round: 12+4 (Note: From 11 countries); Group stage: 16 (Note: From 9 countries); Knockout stage: 8+8; Total: 19+12 (from 12 countries)
- Website: Official website

Final positions
- Champion: (France) CN Marseille (2nd title)
- Runner-up: (Croatia) Jadran Split

The 2025–26 European Aquatics Euro Cup is the 34th edition of European Aquatics's secondary competition for men's water polo clubs, and the 15th edition since being rebranded from the Trophy to the Euro Cup. The season begins on 3 October 2025 and ended on 6 June 2026 with the Final.

This will be the third straight season under the new format, however, this season will witness a change in slot allocation, with only the third and fourth from domestic leagues being allowed to take part.

The winners of the European Aquatics Euro Cup automatically qualify for next season's Champions League and also qualify for the 2026 Super Cup.

Pro Recco are the defending champions, but can't defend their title after advancing to the quarter-finals round of the Champions League.

== Format ==
- Qualification round

16 teams will participate in the qualification round in October 2025. The fourth place teams from national leagues ranked 1–10 plus the champions and runners-up of the national leagues ranked 11–12 (if they choose to enter) take part. The teams are divided into four separate groups, held in centralised venues. After round robin play, the group winners plus the three best runners-up progress to the group stage.

- Group stage

Sixteen teams will play in the group stage which is held between October 2025 to February 2026. The third place teams of national leagues ranked 1–10 can enter this round alongside the seven clubs who advanced from the qualification round. The participants are distributed into four groups of four. After home and away double round robin play, the top two from each group qualifies to the knockout stage.

- Knockout stage

The 8 teams left, plus the 8 teams that were eliminated at the Champions League group stage, go into the knockout stage. There will be an Eighth-finals, Quarter-finals, Semifinals and Final. Each tie is a home and away two legged affair where the aggregate winners advance.

== Rankings ==
The results were based on the results of the past four seasons.

- Associations 1–10 can have two teams ranked 3rd and 4th qualify.
- Associations 11–12 can have two teams ranked 1st and 2nd qualify.

Apart from the distribution based on the rankings, countries could have additional teams participating in the Euro Cup, as noted below:

- (CL) – Additional teams dropping down from the Champions League

Rank	Association	Points	Teams	Notes
1	Italy	99,917.5	2	
2	Hungary	80,465	2	
3	Serbia	71,510	2	
4	Spain	69,187.5	2	
5	Greece	59,917.5	2	+1 (CL)
6	Croatia	59,642.5	2	
7	France	41,195	1	+1 (CL)
8	Germany	24,812.5	2	+1 (CL)
9	Romania	23,817.5	2	+1 (CL)
10	Montenegro	18,647.5	1	
11	(Georgia (country)) Georgia	10,292.5	2	
12	Netherlands	5,790	1	
13	Turkey	5,722.5	0	
14	Portugal	5,292.5	0	
15	Switzerland	4,245	0	

Rank	Association	Points	Teams	Notes
16	Slovenia	3,800	0	
17	Lithuania	3,677.5	0	
18	Slovakia	3,555	0	
19	(United Kingdom) Great Britain	2,280	0	
20	Belgium	2,170	0	
21	Israel	1,850	0	
22	Cyprus	1,490	0	
23	Malta	1,472	0	
24	Finland	1,420	0	
25	Bosnia and Herzegovina	1,190	0	
26	Russia	1,087.5	0	
27	Bulgaria	370	0	
28	Poland	317.5	0	
29	Denmark	280	0	

=== Ranking facts ===
Biggest rise
Pos	Team	Ori	New	Move
1	Cyprus	28	22	▲ +6
2	Portugal	17	14	▲ +3
2	Israel	24	21	▲ +3

Biggest fall
Pos	Team	Ori	New	Move
1	Russia	13	26	▼ –13
2	Bosnia and Herzegovina	20	25	▼ –5
3	Denmark	25	29	▼ –4

New entries
None

Leaving entries
None

== Teams ==
Starting this season, only the third and fourth teams from national leagues ranked 1–10 and champions and runners-up from national leagues ranked 11–12 are permitted to enter. Starting this season, champions from countries ranked below the top 12 are not permitted to enter.

Unlike last season, in the event that a club decides not to enter, the next best team is not allowed to take their place.

=== Qualified teams ===
The labels in the parentheses show how each team qualified for the place of its starting round:

- CL: Champions League title holders
- EC: Euro Cup title holders
- 1st, 2nd, 3rd, 4th,: League positions of the previous season
- CL: Transferred from the Champions League
  - QR: Transferred from the Champions League qualification round
  - GS: Transferred from the Champions League group stage

Entry round	Teams			
Knockout stage	(Serbia) Radnički Kragujevac (CL GS)	(Hungary) Vasas SC (CL GS)	(Montenegro) Jadran m:tel Herceg Novi (CL GS)	(Croatia) Jadran Split (CL GS)
Knockout stage	(Romania) CSM Oradea (CL GS)	(Montenegro) Primorac Kotor (CL GS)	(Spain) KEIO CN Sabadell (CL GS)	(France) CN Marseille (CL GS)
Group stage	(Italy) RN Savona (3rd)	(Hungary) BVSC Manna ABC (3rd)	(Spain) CN Barcelona (3rd)	(Serbia) VK Šabac Elixir (3rd)
Group stage	(Greece) Panathinaikos AC (3rd)	(Croatia) VK Jug AO (3rd)	(Germany) ASC Duisburg (3rd)	(Montenegro) PVK Budućnost Podgorica (3rd)
Group stage	(Romania) CS Dinamo București (3rd)			
Qualification round	(Romania) Steaua București (CL QR)	(France) Pays d'Aix Natation (CL QR)	(Germany) Spandau 04 (CL QR)	(Greece) NC Vouliagmeni (CL QR)
Qualification round	(Italy) Pallanuoto Trieste (4th)	(Hungary) Szolnoki Dozsa Praktiker (4th)	(Spain) CN Terrassa (4th)	(Serbia) BVK Crvena zvezda (4th)
Qualification round	(Greece) GS Apollon Smyrnis (4th)	(Croatia) VK Solaris (4th)	(France) Montpellier Water Polo (4th)	(Germany) OSC Potsdam (4th)
Qualification round	(Romania) CS Rapid București (4th)	(Georgia (country)) A-Polo Sport Management (1st)	(Georgia (country)) WPC Dinamo Tbilisi (2nd)	(Netherlands) ZV De Zaan (1st)

==== Name changes ====
The following teams' names were changed during the season.

== Round and draw dates ==
Phase	Round	Draw date	Round date
Qualification round	All rounds	28 July 2025	3–5 October 2025
Main round	Matchday 1	28 July 2025	16 October 2025
Main round	Matchday 2	28 July 2025	30 October 2025
Main round	Matchday 3	28 July 2025	13 November 2025
Main round	Matchday 4	28 July 2025	20 November 2025
Main round	Matchday 5	28 July 2025	4 December 2025
Main round	Matchday 6	28 July 2025	12 February 2026
Eighth-finals	First leg	16 February 2026	25 February 2026
Eighth-finals	Second leg	16 February 2026	7 March 2026
Quarter-finals	First leg		18 March 2026
Quarter-finals	Second leg		28 March 2026
Semi-finals	First leg		25 April 2026
Semi-finals	Second leg		9 May 2026
Finals	First leg		23 May 2026
Finals	Second leg		6 June 2026

== Qualification round ==
The group winners and three best runners-up qualify for the group stage, while everyone else drops down to the Conference Cup qualifiers, bar the teams that took part in Champions League qualification. The draw was on 28 July 2025 in Zagreb, Croatia. The seeding is based on the club rankings.

=== Group A ===
3–5 October 2025, Athens, Greece

Pos	Team	Pld	W	PSW	PSL	L	GF	GA	GD	Pts	Qualification	SPA	APO	MAN	ZAAN
1	(Germany) Spandau 04	3	2	0	0	1	46	35	+11	6 (Note: Spandau 04 16–11 GS Apollon Smyrnis)	Group stage	—	—	11–16	21–9
2	(Greece) GS Apollon Smyrnis (H)	3	2	0	0	1	47	41	+6	6		10–14	—	14–12	23–15
3	(Georgia (country)) A-Polo Sport Management	3	1	1	0	1	47	43	+4	5		—	—	—	—
4	(Netherlands) ZV De Zaan	3	0	0	1	2	42	63	−21	1		18–19 (Note: Match ended 14–14. A-Polo Sport Management won 5–4 on penalties.)	—	—	—

Source: European Aquatics Euro Cup
(H) Host

=== Group B ===
3–5 October 2025, Montpellier, France

Pos	Team	Pld	W	PSW	PSL	L	GF	GA	GD	Pts	Qualification	TRI	VOU	CRV	MON
1	(Italy) Pallanuoto Trieste	3	2	0	1	0	57	47	+10	7	Group stage	—	—	—	—
2	(Greece) NC Vouliagmeni	3	1	1	1	0	62	48	+14	6	Group stage	23–22 (Note: Match ended 17–17, NC Vouliagmeni won 6–5 on penalties.)	—	16–17 (Note: Match ended 11–11, BVK Crvena zvezda won 6–5 on penalties.)	—
3	(Serbia) BVK Crvena zvezda	3	1	1	0	1	51	38	+13	5		11–12	—	—	—
4	(France) Montpellier Water Polo (H)	3	0	0	0	3	32	69	−37	0		13–23	9–23	10–23	—

Source: European Aquatics Euro Cup
(H) Host

=== Group C ===
3–5 October 2025, Šibenik, Croatia

Pos	Team	Pld	W	PSW	PSL	L	GF	GA	GD	Pts	Qualification	SOL	STE	RAP	DIN
1	(Croatia) VK Solaris Šibenik (H)	3	3	0	0	0	51	40	+11	9	Group stage	—	13–12	21–14	17–14
2	(Romania) Steaua București	3	2	0	0	1	45	31	+14	6	Group stage	—	—	—	—
3	(Romania) CS Rapid București	3	1	0	0	2	39	51	−12	3		—	10–19	—	—
4	(Georgia (country)) WPC Dinamo Tbilisi	3	0	0	0	3	33	46	−13	0		—	8–14	11–15	—

Source: European Aquatics Euro Cup
(H) Host

=== Group D ===
3–5 October 2025, Terrassa, Spain

Pos	Team	Pld	W	PSW	PSL	L	GF	GA	GD	Pts	Qualification	TER	SZO	PAY	POT
1	(Spain) CN Terrassa (H)	3	3	0	0	0	50	21	+29	9	Group stage	—	13–4	13–8	24–9
2	(Hungary) Szolnoki Dozsa Praktiker	3	2	0	0	1	41	33	+8	6	Group stage	4–13	—	—	14–10
3	(France) Pays d'Aix Natation	3	1	0	0	2	31	44	−13	3		—	—	—	13–8
4	(Germany) OSC Potsdam	3	0	0	0	3	27	51	−24	0		—	—	—	—

Source: European Aquatics Euro Cup
(H) Host

=== Ranking of second-placed teams ===
Pos	Grp	Team	Pld	W	PSW	PSL	L	GF	GA	GD	Pts	Qualification
1	B	(Greece) NC Vouliagmeni	3	1	1	1	0	62	48	+14	6	Group stage
2	C	(Romania) Steaua București	3	2	0	0	1	45	31	+14	6	Group stage
3	D	(Hungary) Szolnoki Dozsa Praktiker	3	2	0	0	1	41	33	+8	6	Group stage
4	A	(Greece) GS Apollon Smyrnis	3	2	0	0	1	47	41	+6	6	

Source: European Aquatics Euro Cup
Rules for classification: 1) points; 2) goal difference; 3) number of goals scored.

== Group stage ==
Location of teams of the 2025–26 European Aquatics Euro Cup group stage.
Red: Group A; Blue: Group B; Yellow: Group C; Green: Group D.

The draw took place on the 28 July 2025 in Zagreb, Croatia.

The top 2 from every group advances to the Eighth-finals.

Teams are ranked according to points (3 points for a win, 2 points for a penalty shootout win, 1 point for a penalty shootout loss, 0 points for a loss), and if tied on points, the following tiebreaking criteria are applied, in the order given, to determine the rankings:

- Points in head-to-head matches among tied teams;
- Goal difference in head-to-head matches among tied teams;
- Goals scored in head-to-head matches among tied teams;
- Goal difference in all group matches;
- Goals scored in all group matches.

Nine countries are being represented, with Croatia, Greece, Hungary, Italy and Spain all having the most clubs with two each. CN Terrassa, CS Dinamo București and PVK Budućnost Podgorica are making their debut.

=== Group A ===
Pos	Team	Pld	W	PSW	PSL	L	GF	GA	GD	Pts	Qualification	JUG	TER	SOL	DUI
1	(Croatia) Jug AO Dubrovnik	6	6	0	0	0	80	53	+27	18	Eighth-finals	—	16–12	12–10	19–10
2	(Spain) CN Terrassa	6	4	0	0	2	72	71	+1	12	Eighth-finals	12–15	—	16–12	14–13
3	(Croatia) VK Solaris Šibenik	6	1	0	0	5	65	70	−5	3 (Note: VK Solaris Šibenik 28–24 ASC Duisburg)		9–16	15–18	—	15–10
4	(Germany) ASC Duisburg	6	1	0	0	5	56	79	−23	3		9–18	13–14	14–13	—

Source: European Aquatics Euro Cup

=== Group B ===
Pos	Team	Pld	W	PSW	PSL	L	GF	GA	GD	Pts	Qualification	SZO	BAR	TRI	DIN
1	(Hungary) Szolnoki Dozsa-Praktiker	6	5	0	0	1	89	76	+13	15	Eighth-finals	—	10–14	16–14	16–9
2	(Spain) CN Barcelona	6	4	0	0	2	102	79	+23	12	Eighth-finals	12–16	—	19–12	22–11
3	(Italy) Pallanuoto Trieste	6	3	0	0	3	91	97	−6	9		12–15	20–16	—	17–16
4	(Romania) CS Dinamo București	6	0	0	0	6	76	106	−30	0		15–16	10–19	15–16	—

Source: European Aquatics Euro Cup

=== Group C ===
Pos	Team	Pld	W	PSW	PSL	L	GF	GA	GD	Pts	Qualification	BVSC	PAN	VOU	BUD
1	(Hungary) BVSC-Manna ABC	6	3	1	2	0	111	90	+21	13	Eighth-finals	—	13–10	23–22 (Note: Match finished 13–13. NC Vouliagmeni won 9–8 on penalties.)	20–9
2	(Greece) Panathinaikos	6	3	1	1	1	91	77	+14	12	Eighth-finals	21–18 (Note: Match finished 17–17. Panathinaikos won 4–1 on penalties.)	—	16–17 (Note: Match finished 10–10. NC Vouliagmeni won 7–6 on penalties.)	16–8
3	(Greece) NC Vouliagmeni	6	2	2	1	1	107	88	+19	11		20–19 (Note: Match finished 13–13. BVSC-Manna ABC won 10–9 on penalties.)	12–14	—	19–9
4	(Montenegro) PVK Budućnost Podgorica	6	0	0	0	6	50	104	−54	0		8–18	9–14	7–17	—

Source: European Aquatics Euro Cup

=== Group D ===
Pos	Team	Pld	W	PSW	PSL	L	GF	GA	GD	Pts	Qualification	SAV	SAB	SPA	STE
1	(Italy) RN Savona	6	4	0	1	1	86	78	+8	13	Eighth-finals	—	17–12	17–11	16–17 (Note: Match ended 13–13. Steaua București won 4–3 on penalties.)
2	(Serbia) VK Šabac	6	4	0	0	2	67	68	−1	12	Eighth-finals	13–9	—	11–8	11–9
3	(Germany) Spandau 04	6	3	0	0	3	76	75	+1	9		15–16	18–12	—	13–10
4	(Romania) Steaua București	6	0	1	0	5	62	70	−8	2		10–11	7–8	9–11	—

Source: European Aquatics Euro Cup

== Knockout stage ==
Eighth-finals
(Greece) Panathinaikos	11	22	33
(Montenegro) Jadran m:tel Herceg Novi	10	22	32
(Hungary) Szolnoki Dozsa-Praktiker	10	14	24
(Croatia) Jadran Split	15	21	36
(Hungary) Vasas SC	11	13	24
(Hungary) BVSC-Manna ABC	8	20	28
(Romania) CSM Oradea	14	14	28
(Spain) CN Terrassa	13	14	27
(Italy) RN Savona	11	13	24
(France) CN Marseille	12	13	25
(Spain) KEIO CN Sabadell	11	6	17
(Serbia) VK Šabac	3	9	12
(Montenegro) Primorac Kotor	14	14	28
(Croatia) Jug AO Dubrovnik	13	12	25
(Spain) CN Barcelona	10	15	25
(Serbia) Radnički Kragujevac	15	17	32

Quarterfinals
(Greece) Panathinaikos	10	19	29
(Croatia) Jadran Split	11	19	30
(Hungary) BVSC-Manna ABC	14	12	26
(Romania) CSM Oradea	8	7	15
(France) CN Marseille	17	14	31
(Spain) KEIO CN Sabadell	12	14	26
(Montenegro) Primorac Kotor	10	15	25
(Serbia) Radnički Kragujevac	14	17	31

Semifinals
(Croatia) Jadran Split	13	14	27
(Hungary) BVSC-Manna ABC	12	12	24
(France) CN Marseille	14	16	30
(Serbia) Radnički Kragujevac	17	11	28

Final
(Croatia) Jadran Split	16	16	32
(France) CN Marseille	19	14	33

=== Eighth-finals ===
The first legs were played on 24 February to 7 March, and the second legs were played on 7 March to 14 March.

Team 1	Agg.	Team 2	1st leg	2nd leg
Panathinaikos (Greece)	33–32	(Montenegro) Jadran m:tel Herceg Novi	11–10	22–22 PS
CSM Oradea (Romania)	28–27	(Spain) CN Terrassa	14–13	14–14
KEIO CN Sabadell (Spain)	17–12	(Serbia) VK Šabac	11–3	6–9
CN Barcelona (Spain)	25–32	(Serbia) Radnički Kragujevac	10–15	15–17
RN Savona (Italy)	24–25	(France) CN Marseille	11–12	13–13
Vasas SC (Hungary)	24–28	(Hungary) BVSC-Manna ABC	11–8	13–20
Primorac Kotor (Montenegro)	28–25	(Croatia) Jug AO Dubrovnik	14–13	14–12
Szolnoki Dozsa-Praktiker (Hungary)	24–36	(Croatia) Jadran Split	10–15	14–21

=== Quarterfinals ===
The draw was on 9 March 2026. The first legs were played on 18 March, and the second legs were played on 28 March.

Team 1	Agg.	Team 2	1st leg	2nd leg
Primorac Kotor (Montenegro)	25–31	(Serbia) Radnički Kragujevac	9–14	15–17
CN Marseille (France)	31–26	(Spain) KEIO CN Sabadell	17–12	14–14
BVSC-Manna ABC (Hungary)	26–15	(Romania) CSM Oradea	14–8	12–7
Panathinaikos (Greece)	29–30	(Croatia) Jadran Split	10–11	19–19

=== Semifinals ===
The first legs were played on 25 April, and the second legs were played on 9 May.

Team 1	Agg.	Team 2	1st leg	2nd leg
Radnički Kragujevac (Serbia)	28–30	(France) CN Marseille	17–14	11–16
Jadran Split (Croatia)	27–24	(Hungary) BVSC-Manna ABC	13–12	14–12

=== Final ===
The first leg was played on 23 May, and the second leg was played on 6 June.

Team 1	Agg.	Team 2	1st leg	2nd leg
Jadran Split (Croatia)	32–33	(France) CN Marseille	16–19	16–14

2025–26 European Aquatics Euro Cup Champions

CN Marseille
Second title

== See also ==
- 2025–26 European Aquatics Champions League
- 2025–26 European Aquatics Conference Cup
- 2025–26 European Aquatics Challenger Cup
- 2025 European Aquatics Super Cup
- 2025–26 European Aquatics Women's Champions League
- 2025–26 European Aquatics Women's Euro Cup
- 2025–26 European Aquatics Women's Conference Cup
- 2025–26 European Aquatics Women's Challenger Cup
- 2025 European Aquatics Women's Super Cup
