= 2025–26 European Aquatics Euro Cup qualification round =

- 2025–26

Tournament information
- Sport: Water polo
- Date: 3–5 October 2025
- Host(s): (Greece) Athens (France) Montpellier (Croatia) Šibenik (Spain) Terrassa
- Teams: 12+4 (from 12 countries)
- Website: Official website

Tournament statistics
- Matches played: 24

The 2025–26 European Aquatics Euro Cup qualification round is played between 3 and 5 October 2025 to determine the seven teams advancing to the group stage of the 2025–26 European Aquatics Euro Cup.

== Format ==
The 16 teams were placed into four groups of four teams. In each group, teams will play against each other once in a round-robin format. The group winners and three best runners up will advance to the group stage.

Teams are ranked according to points (3 points for a win, 2 points for a penalty shootout win, 1 point for a penalty shootout loss, 0 points for a loss), and if tied on points, the following tiebreaking criteria are applied, in the order given, to determine the rankings:

- Points in head-to-head matches among tied teams;
- Goal difference in head-to-head matches among tied teams;
- Goals scored in head-to-head matches among tied teams;
- Goal difference in all group matches;
- Goals scored in all group matches.

== Draw ==
External videos
- 2025–26 European Aquatics Euro Cup qualification round – Draw
- Draw

The draw was on 28 July 2025 in Zagreb, Croatia. (H) indicates which clubs is hosting a group. The seeding is based on the club rankings.

Key to colours
Teams advancing to group stage

Pot 1
Team	Rank	Points
(Romania) Steaua București (Note: Team not known at the time of the draw. Was the third place team from Champions League qualifiaction Group A.)	16	11,480
(France) Pays d'Aix Natation (Note: Team not known at the time of the draw. Was the fourth place team from Champions League qualifiaction Group A.)	70	820
(Germany) Spandau 04 (Note: Team not known at the time of the draw. Was the third place team from Champions League qualifiaction Group B.)	19	10,400
(Greece) NC Vouliagmeni (Note: Team not known at the time of the draw. Was the third place team from Champions League qualifiaction Group C.)	13	12,687.5

Pot 3
Team	Rank	Points
(Italy) Pallanuoto Trieste	35	3,947.5
(Croatia) VK Solaris (H)	38	3,272.5
(Netherlands) ZV De Zaan	49	2,075
(Spain) CN Terrassa (H)	50	2,017.5

Pot 2
Team	Rank	Points
(Georgia (country)) WPC Dinamo Tbilisi	20	10,292.5
(Serbia) BVK Crvena zvezda	27	8,652.5
(Hungary) Szolnoki Dozsa Praktiker	30	6,910
(Greece) GS Apollon Smyrnis (H)	34	4,210

Pot 4
Team	Rank	Points
(France) Montpellier Water Polo (H)	71	815
(Germany) OSC Potsdam	92	370
(Romania) CS Rapid București	N/A	
(Georgia (country)) A-Polo Sport Management	N/A	

== Groups ==
=== Group A ===
3–5 October 2025, Athens, Greece

Pos	Team	Pld	W	PSW	PSL	L	GF	GA	GD	Pts	Qualification	SPA	APO	MAN	ZAAN
1	(Germany) Spandau 04	3	2	0	0	1	46	35	+11	6 (Note: Spandau 04 16–11 GS Apollon Smyrnis)	Group stage	—	—	11–16	21–9
2	(Greece) GS Apollon Smyrnis (H)	3	2	0	0	1	47	41	+6	6		10–14	—	14–12	23–15
3	(Georgia (country)) A-Polo Sport Management	3	1	1	0	1	47	43	+4	5		—	—	—	—
4	(Netherlands) ZV De Zaan	3	0	0	1	2	42	63	−21	1		18–19 (Note: Match ended 14–14. A-Polo Sport Management won 5–4 on penalties.)	—	—	—

Source: European Aquatics Euro Cup
(H) Host
Notes:

3 October 2025; 19:00	Report	ZV De Zaan (Netherlands)	18–19 (PSO)	(Georgia (country)) A-Polo Sport Management	Serafio Swimming Pool, Athens; Referees: Julien Bourges (FRA), Norbert Ersce (HUN)
3 October 2025; 19:00	Report	Score by quarters: 4–5, 2–1, 2–5, 6–3 PSO: 4–5			Serafio Swimming Pool, Athens; Referees: Julien Bourges (FRA), Norbert Ersce (HUN)
3 October 2025; 19:00	Report	Garancsy 4	Goals	Alekseev 4	Serafio Swimming Pool, Athens; Referees: Julien Bourges (FRA), Norbert Ersce (HUN)

3 October 2025; 21:00	Report	GS Apollon Smyrnis (Greece)	10–14	(Germany) Spandau 04	Serafio Swimming Pool, Athens; Referees: Vlaho Radicevic (CRO), Bozo Duraskovic (MNE)
3 October 2025; 21:00	Report	Score by quarters: 3–4, 2–5, 2–1, 3–4			Serafio Swimming Pool, Athens; Referees: Vlaho Radicevic (CRO), Bozo Duraskovic (MNE)
3 October 2025; 21:00	Report	three players 2	Goals	Caraj, Nagy 4	Serafio Swimming Pool, Athens; Referees: Vlaho Radicevic (CRO), Bozo Duraskovic (MNE)

4 October 2025; 19:00	Report	Spandau 04 (Germany)	21–9	(Netherlands) ZV De Zaan	Serafio Swimming Pool, Athens; Referees: Vlaho Radicevic (CRO), Julien Bourges (FRA)
4 October 2025; 19:00	Report	Score by quarters: 6–4, 5–1, 7–2, 3–2			Serafio Swimming Pool, Athens; Referees: Vlaho Radicevic (CRO), Julien Bourges (FRA)
4 October 2025; 19:00	Report	Kojic 4	Goals	Rempt, Meijn 2	Serafio Swimming Pool, Athens; Referees: Vlaho Radicevic (CRO), Julien Bourges (FRA)

4 October 2025; 21:00	Report	GS Apollon Smyrnis (Greece)	14–12	(Georgia (country)) A-Polo Sport Management	Serafio Swimming Pool, Athens; Referees: Norbert Ersce (HUN), Bozo Duraskovic (MNE)
4 October 2025; 21:00	Report	Score by quarters: 2–4, 6–2, 2–4, 4–2			Serafio Swimming Pool, Athens; Referees: Norbert Ersce (HUN), Bozo Duraskovic (MNE)
4 October 2025; 21:00	Report	Daube 4	Goals	Alekseev 5	Serafio Swimming Pool, Athens; Referees: Norbert Ersce (HUN), Bozo Duraskovic (MNE)

5 October 2025; 11:00	Report	Spandau 04 (Germany)	11–16	(Georgia (country)) A-Polo Sport Management	Serafio Swimming Pool, Athens; Referees: Bozo Duraskovic (MNE), Norbert Ersce (HUN)
5 October 2025; 11:00	Report	Score by quarters: 2–4, 1–3, 5–4, 3–5			Serafio Swimming Pool, Athens; Referees: Bozo Duraskovic (MNE), Norbert Ersce (HUN)
5 October 2025; 11:00	Report	three players 2	Goals	Alekseev 5	Serafio Swimming Pool, Athens; Referees: Bozo Duraskovic (MNE), Norbert Ersce (HUN)

5 October 2025; 13:00	Report	GS Apollon Smyrnis (Greece)	23–15	(Netherlands) ZV De Zaan	Serafio Swimming Pool, Athens; Referees: Julien Bourges (FRA), Vlaho Radicevic (CRO)
5 October 2025; 13:00	Report	Score by quarters: 6–4, 7–3, 4–4, 6–4			Serafio Swimming Pool, Athens; Referees: Julien Bourges (FRA), Vlaho Radicevic (CRO)
5 October 2025; 13:00	Report	Bogdanović, Daube 5	Goals	Garancsy 4	Serafio Swimming Pool, Athens; Referees: Julien Bourges (FRA), Vlaho Radicevic (CRO)

=== Group B ===
3–5 October 2025, Montpellier, France

Pos	Team	Pld	W	PSW	PSL	L	GF	GA	GD	Pts	Qualification	TRI	VOU	CRV	MON
1	(Italy) Pallanuoto Trieste	3	2	0	1	0	57	47	+10	7	Group stage	—	—	—	—
2	(Greece) NC Vouliagmeni	3	1	1	1	0	62	48	+14	6	Group stage	23–22 (Note: Match ended 17–17, NC Vouliagmeni won 6–5 on penalties.)	—	16–17 (Note: Match ended 11–11, BVK Crvena zvezda won 6–5 on penalties.)	—
3	(Serbia) BVK Crvena zvezda	3	1	1	0	1	51	38	+13	5		11–12	—	—	—
4	(France) Montpellier Water Polo (H)	3	0	0	0	3	32	69	−37	0		13–23	9–23	10–23	—

Source: European Aquatics Euro Cup
(H) Host

3 October 2025; 18:30	Report	BVK Crvena zvezda (Serbia)	11–12	(Italy) Pallanuoto Trieste	Angelotti Olympic Swimming Pool, Montpellier; Referees: Frank Ohme (GER), Tomi Kavcic (SLO)
3 October 2025; 18:30	Report	Score by quarters: 1–3, 2–2, 5–3, 3–4			Angelotti Olympic Swimming Pool, Montpellier; Referees: Frank Ohme (GER), Tomi Kavcic (SLO)
3 October 2025; 18:30	Report	Radovic, Tankosic 3	Goals	Draskovic 4	Angelotti Olympic Swimming Pool, Montpellier; Referees: Frank Ohme (GER), Tomi Kavcic (SLO)

3 October 2025; 20:30	Report	Montpellier Water Polo (France)	9–23	(Greece) NC Vouliagmeni	Angelotti Olympic Swimming Pool, Montpellier; Referees: Peter de Jong (NED), Rajmund Fodor (HUN)
3 October 2025; 20:30	Report	Score by quarters: 2–4, 3–6, 3–7, 1–6			Angelotti Olympic Swimming Pool, Montpellier; Referees: Peter de Jong (NED), Rajmund Fodor (HUN)
3 October 2025; 20:30	Report	Palantal, Stojanovic 3	Goals	Spachits 7	Angelotti Olympic Swimming Pool, Montpellier; Referees: Peter de Jong (NED), Rajmund Fodor (HUN)

4 October 2025; 18:30	Report	NC Vouliagmeni (Greece)	16–17 (PSO)	(Serbia) BVK Crvena zvezda	Angelotti Olympic Swimming Pool, Montpellier; Referees: Peter de Jong (NED), Tomi Kavcic (SLO)
4 October 2025; 18:30	Report	Score by quarters: 4–3, 3–3, 2–2, 2–3 PSO: 5–6			Angelotti Olympic Swimming Pool, Montpellier; Referees: Peter de Jong (NED), Tomi Kavcic (SLO)
4 October 2025; 18:30	Report	Chatzis, Kastrinakis 3	Goals	Pjesivac 3	Angelotti Olympic Swimming Pool, Montpellier; Referees: Peter de Jong (NED), Tomi Kavcic (SLO)

4 October 2025; 20:30	Report	Montpellier Water Polo (France)	13–23	(Italy) Pallanuoto Trieste	Angelotti Olympic Swimming Pool, Montpellier; Referees: Frank Ohme (GER), Rajmund Fodor (HUN)
4 October 2025; 20:30	Report	Score by quarters: 5–5, 2–6, 2–6, 4–7			Angelotti Olympic Swimming Pool, Montpellier; Referees: Frank Ohme (GER), Rajmund Fodor (HUN)
4 October 2025; 20:30	Report	five players 2	Goals	Draskovic 8	Angelotti Olympic Swimming Pool, Montpellier; Referees: Frank Ohme (GER), Rajmund Fodor (HUN)

5 October 2025; 10:00	Report	NC Vouliagmeni (Greece)	23–22 (PSO)	(Italy) Pallanuoto Trieste	Angelotti Olympic Swimming Pool, Montpellier; Referees: Rajmund Fodor (HUN), Peter de Jong (NED)
5 October 2025; 10:00	Report	Score by quarters: 3–6, 5–2, 4–5, 5–4 PSO: 6–5			Angelotti Olympic Swimming Pool, Montpellier; Referees: Rajmund Fodor (HUN), Peter de Jong (NED)
5 October 2025; 10:00	Report	Troulos 6	Goals	Draskovic 6	Angelotti Olympic Swimming Pool, Montpellier; Referees: Rajmund Fodor (HUN), Peter de Jong (NED)

5 October 2025; 12:00	Report	Montpellier Water Polo (France)	10–23	(Serbia) BVK Crvena zvezda	Angelotti Olympic Swimming Pool, Montpellier; Referees: Frank Ohme (GER), Tomi Kavcic (SLO)
5 October 2025; 12:00	Report	Score by quarters: 0–5, 3–4, 2–5, 5–9			Angelotti Olympic Swimming Pool, Montpellier; Referees: Frank Ohme (GER), Tomi Kavcic (SLO)
5 October 2025; 12:00	Report	five players 2	Goals	Šulc 5	Angelotti Olympic Swimming Pool, Montpellier; Referees: Frank Ohme (GER), Tomi Kavcic (SLO)

=== Group C ===
3–5 October 2025, Šibenik, Croatia

Pos	Team	Pld	W	PSW	PSL	L	GF	GA	GD	Pts	Qualification	SOL	STE	RAP	DIN
1	(Croatia) VK Solaris Šibenik (H)	3	3	0	0	0	51	40	+11	9	Group stage	—	13–12	21–14	17–14
2	(Romania) Steaua București	3	2	0	0	1	45	31	+14	6	Group stage	—	—	—	—
3	(Romania) CS Rapid București	3	1	0	0	2	39	51	−12	3		—	10–19	—	—
4	(Georgia (country)) WPC Dinamo Tbilisi	3	0	0	0	3	33	46	−13	0		—	8–14	11–15	—

Source: European Aquatics Euro Cup
(H) Host

3 October 2025; 18:00	Report	CS Rapid București (Romania)	10–19	(Romania) Steaua București	Crnica Swimming Pool, Šibenik; Referees: Sander Gransjean (NED), Konstantinos Vasileiou (GRE)
3 October 2025; 18:00	Report	Score by quarters: 3–2, 5–6, 0–4, 2–7			Crnica Swimming Pool, Šibenik; Referees: Sander Gransjean (NED), Konstantinos Vasileiou (GRE)
3 October 2025; 18:00	Report	Octavian Andrei 3	Goals	Vucinic 5	Crnica Swimming Pool, Šibenik; Referees: Sander Gransjean (NED), Konstantinos Vasileiou (GRE)

3 October 2025; 20:00	Report	VK Solaris Šibenik (Croatia)	17–14	(Georgia (country)) WPC Dinamo Tbilisi	Crnica Swimming Pool, Šibenik; Referees: Alessandro Severo (ITA), Alex Mas Marquez (ESP)
3 October 2025; 20:00	Report	Score by quarters: 4–3, 4–3, 4–1, 5–7			Crnica Swimming Pool, Šibenik; Referees: Alessandro Severo (ITA), Alex Mas Marquez (ESP)
3 October 2025; 20:00	Report	Cubranic, Pelicaric 4	Goals	Magrakvelidze 6	Crnica Swimming Pool, Šibenik; Referees: Alessandro Severo (ITA), Alex Mas Marquez (ESP)

4 October 2025; 18:00	Report	WPC Dinamo Tbilisi (Georgia (country))	8–14	(Romania) Steaua București	Crnica Swimming Pool, Šibenik; Referees: Alessandro Severo (ITA), Sander Gransjean (NED)
4 October 2025; 18:00	Report	Score by quarters: 0–3, 2–3, 2–4, 4–4			Crnica Swimming Pool, Šibenik; Referees: Alessandro Severo (ITA), Sander Gransjean (NED)
4 October 2025; 18:00	Report	Drasković, Tkeshelashvili 2	Goals	Vucinic 4	Crnica Swimming Pool, Šibenik; Referees: Alessandro Severo (ITA), Sander Gransjean (NED)

4 October 2025; 20:00	Report	VK Solaris Šibenik (Croatia)	21–14	(Romania) CS Rapid București	Crnica Swimming Pool, Šibenik; Referees: Alex Mas Marquez (ESP), Konstantinos Vasileiou (GRE)
4 October 2025; 20:00	Report	Score by quarters: 5–4, 4–3, 5–3, 7–4			Crnica Swimming Pool, Šibenik; Referees: Alex Mas Marquez (ESP), Konstantinos Vasileiou (GRE)
4 October 2025; 20:00	Report	Cubranic 7	Goals	Goreta, Vrbnjak 3	Crnica Swimming Pool, Šibenik; Referees: Alex Mas Marquez (ESP), Konstantinos Vasileiou (GRE)

5 October 2025; 10:30	Report	WPC Dinamo Tbilisi (Georgia (country))	11–15	(Romania) CS Rapid București	Crnica Swimming Pool, Šibenik; Referees: Alessandro Severo (ITA), Konstantinos Vasileiou (GRE)
5 October 2025; 10:30	Report	Score by quarters: 2–4, 4–3, 4–4, 1–4			Crnica Swimming Pool, Šibenik; Referees: Alessandro Severo (ITA), Konstantinos Vasileiou (GRE)
5 October 2025; 10:30	Report	Drasković 4	Goals	Goreta 5	Crnica Swimming Pool, Šibenik; Referees: Alessandro Severo (ITA), Konstantinos Vasileiou (GRE)

5 October 2025; 12:30	Report	VK Solaris Šibenik (Croatia)	13–12	(Romania) Steaua București	Crnica Swimming Pool, Šibenik; Referees: Sander Gransjean (NED), Alex Mas Marquez (ESP)
5 October 2025; 12:30	Report	Score by quarters: 3–4, 4–2, 5–4, 1–2			Crnica Swimming Pool, Šibenik; Referees: Sander Gransjean (NED), Alex Mas Marquez (ESP)
5 October 2025; 12:30	Report	Bajic, Vlahović 3	Goals	four players 2	Crnica Swimming Pool, Šibenik; Referees: Sander Gransjean (NED), Alex Mas Marquez (ESP)

=== Group D ===
3–5 October 2025, Terrassa, Spain

Pos	Team	Pld	W	PSW	PSL	L	GF	GA	GD	Pts	Qualification	TER	SZO	PAY	POT
1	(Spain) CN Terrassa (H)	3	3	0	0	0	50	21	+29	9	Group stage	—	13–4	13–8	24–9
2	(Hungary) Szolnoki Dozsa Praktiker	3	2	0	0	1	41	33	+8	6	Group stage	4–13	—	—	14–10
3	(France) Pays d'Aix Natation	3	1	0	0	2	31	44	−13	3		—	—	—	13–8
4	(Germany) OSC Potsdam	3	0	0	0	3	27	51	−24	0		—	—	—	—

Source: European Aquatics Euro Cup
(H) Host

3 October 2025; 19:00	Report	CN Terrassa (Spain)	24–9	(Germany) OSC Potsdam	Àrea Olímpica, Terrassa; Referees: Nikolaos Boudramis (GRE), Bogdan Beljin (SRB)
3 October 2025; 19:00	Report	Score by quarters: 7–0, 7–5, 6–1, 4–3			Àrea Olímpica, Terrassa; Referees: Nikolaos Boudramis (GRE), Bogdan Beljin (SRB)
3 October 2025; 19:00	Report	ten Broek 5	Goals	Hofmann 2	Àrea Olímpica, Terrassa; Referees: Nikolaos Boudramis (GRE), Bogdan Beljin (SRB)

3 October 2025; 21:00	Report	Szolnoki Dozsa Praktiker (Hungary)	23–10	(France) Pays d'Aix Natation	Àrea Olímpica, Terrassa; Referees: Daniele Bianco (ITA), Mihai Balanescu (ROU)
3 October 2025; 21:00	Report	Score by quarters: 7–1, 4–5, 3–2, 9–2			Àrea Olímpica, Terrassa; Referees: Daniele Bianco (ITA), Mihai Balanescu (ROU)
3 October 2025; 21:00	Report	Zerinvary 4	Goals	Bachelier 3	Àrea Olímpica, Terrassa; Referees: Daniele Bianco (ITA), Mihai Balanescu (ROU)

4 October 2025; 16:00	Report	Szolnoki Dozsa Praktiker (Hungary)	14–10	(Germany) OSC Potsdam	Àrea Olímpica, Terrassa; Referees: Nikolaos Boudramis (GRE), Mihai Balanescu (ROU)
4 October 2025; 16:00	Report	Score by quarters: 2–5, 4–2, 4–2, 4–1			Àrea Olímpica, Terrassa; Referees: Nikolaos Boudramis (GRE), Mihai Balanescu (ROU)
4 October 2025; 16:00	Report	four players 2	Goals	Hofmann 3	Àrea Olímpica, Terrassa; Referees: Nikolaos Boudramis (GRE), Mihai Balanescu (ROU)

4 October 2025; 18:00	Report	CN Terrassa (Spain)	13–8	(France) Pays d'Aix Natation	Àrea Olímpica, Terrassa; Referees: Daniele Bianco (ITA), Bogdan Beljin (SRB)
4 October 2025; 18:00	Report	Score by quarters: 2–3, 4–1, 4–2, 3–2			Àrea Olímpica, Terrassa; Referees: Daniele Bianco (ITA), Bogdan Beljin (SRB)
4 October 2025; 18:00	Report	Cuacos 3	Goals	Braise Fernandez 3	Àrea Olímpica, Terrassa; Referees: Daniele Bianco (ITA), Bogdan Beljin (SRB)

5 October 2025; 11:00	Report	Pays d'Aix Natation' (France)	13–8	(Germany) OSC Potsdam	Àrea Olímpica, Terrassa; Referees: Mihai Balanescu (ROU), Bogdan Beljin (SRB)
5 October 2025; 11:00	Report	Score by quarters: 2–1, 2–2, 6–2, 3–3			Àrea Olímpica, Terrassa; Referees: Mihai Balanescu (ROU), Bogdan Beljin (SRB)
5 October 2025; 11:00	Report	Yutmaz 3	Goals	three players 2	Àrea Olímpica, Terrassa; Referees: Mihai Balanescu (ROU), Bogdan Beljin (SRB)

5 October 2025; 13:00	Report	CN Terrassa (Spain)	13–4	(Hungary) Szolnoki Dozsa Praktiker	Àrea Olímpica, Terrassa; Referees: Daniele Bianco (ITA), Nikolaos Boudramis (GRE)
5 October 2025; 13:00	Report	Score by quarters: 5–0, 2–0, 3–1, 3–3			Àrea Olímpica, Terrassa; Referees: Daniele Bianco (ITA), Nikolaos Boudramis (GRE)
5 October 2025; 13:00	Report	Bargallo Garcia 5	Goals	four players 1	Àrea Olímpica, Terrassa; Referees: Daniele Bianco (ITA), Nikolaos Boudramis (GRE)

=== Ranking of second-placed teams ===
Pos	Grp	Team	Pld	W	PSW	PSL	L	GF	GA	GD	Pts	Qualification
1	B	(Greece) NC Vouliagmeni	3	1	1	1	0	62	48	+14	6	Group stage
2	C	(Romania) Steaua București	3	2	0	0	1	45	31	+14	6	Group stage
3	D	(Hungary) Szolnoki Dozsa Praktiker	3	2	0	0	1	41	33	+8	6	Group stage
4	A	(Greece) GS Apollon Smyrnis	3	2	0	0	1	47	41	+6	6	

Source: European Aquatics Euro Cup
Rules for classification: 1) points; 2) goal difference; 3) number of goals scored.

== See also ==
- 2025–26 European Aquatics Champions League
- 2025–26 European Aquatics Euro Cup
- 2025–26 European Aquatics Conference Cup
- 2025–26 European Aquatics Challenger Cup
- 2025 European Aquatics Super Cup
- 2025–26 European Aquatics Women's Champions League
- 2025–26 European Aquatics Women's Euro Cup
- 2025–26 European Aquatics Women's Conference Cup
- 2025–26 European Aquatics Women's Challenger Cup
- 2025 European Aquatics Women's Super Cup

Reference
Matchday 1
Matchday 2
Matchday 3
