= 2025–26 European Aquatics Euro Cup knockout stage =

Tournament information
- Sport: Water polo
- Date: 25 February – 6 June 2026
- Teams: 16
- Website: Official website

Final positions
- Champions: (France) CN Marseille
- Runner-up: (Croatia) Jadran Split

Tournament statistics
- Matches played: 30

The 2025–26 European Aquatics Euro Cup knockout stage details the matches played to decide the champion of the tournament. Games took place between the 25 February and 6 June 2026.

== Qualified teams ==
The knockout phase involves 16 teams: the eight teams which qualified as winners and runners-ups of each of the four groups in the group stage, and the eight third and fourth placed teams from the Champions League group stage.

=== Euro Cup group stage winners and runners-up ===
Group	Winners	Runners-up
A	(Croatia) Jug AO Dubrovnik	(Spain) CN Terrassa
B	(Hungary) Szolnoki Dozsa-Praktiker	(Spain) CN Barcelona
C	(Hungary) BVSC-Manna ABC	(Greece) Panathinaikos
D	(Italy) RN Savona	(Serbia) VK Šabac

=== Eliminated teams from Champions League ===
Group	Third place	Fourth place
A	(Serbia) Radnički Kragujevac	(Hungary) Vasas SC
B	(Montenegro) Jadran m:tel Herceg Novi	(Croatia) Jadran Split
C	(Romania) CSM Oradea	(Montenegro) Primorac Kotor
D	(Spain) KEIO CN Sabadell	(France) CN Marseille

== Draw ==
External videos
- 2025–26 European Aquatics Euro Cup knockout stage – Draw
- Draw

The draw took place in Zagreb on 16 February 2026. The teams were split into two draws, one containing the four teams who finished fourth in the Champions League group stage, who would be pitted up against a Euro Cup group winner. The other half of the draw would see the third place teams from the Champions League group stage be drawn against a runner up of the Euro Cup group stage.

Fourth in Champions League Team (Hungary) Vasas SC (Croatia) Jadran Split (Montenegro) Primorac Kotor (France) CN Marseille	First in Euro Cup Team (Croatia) Jug AO Dubrovnik (Hungary) Szolnoki Dozsa-Praktiker (Hungary) BVSC-Manna ABC (Italy) RN Savona

Third in Champions League Team (Serbia) Radnički Kragujevac (Montenegro) Jadran m:tel Herceg Novi (Romania) CSM Oradea (Spain) KEIO CN Sabadell	Second in Euro Cup Team (Spain) CN Terrassa (Spain) CN Barcelona (Greece) Panathinaikos (Serbia) VK Šabac

== Bracket ==
In the knockout phase, teams played against each other over two legs on a home-and-away basis.

Eighth-finals
(Greece) Panathinaikos	11	22	33
(Montenegro) Jadran m:tel Herceg Novi	10	22	32
(Hungary) Szolnoki Dozsa-Praktiker	10	14	24
(Croatia) Jadran Split	15	21	36
(Hungary) Vasas SC	11	13	24
(Hungary) BVSC-Manna ABC	8	20	28
(Romania) CSM Oradea	14	14	28
(Spain) CN Terrassa	13	14	27
(Italy) RN Savona	11	13	24
(France) CN Marseille	12	13	25
(Spain) KEIO CN Sabadell	11	6	17
(Serbia) VK Šabac	3	9	12
(Montenegro) Primorac Kotor	14	14	28
(Croatia) Jug AO Dubrovnik	13	12	25
(Spain) CN Barcelona	10	15	25
(Serbia) Radnički Kragujevac	15	17	32

Quarterfinals
(Greece) Panathinaikos	10	19	29
(Croatia) Jadran Split	11	19	30
(Hungary) BVSC-Manna ABC	14	12	26
(Romania) CSM Oradea	8	7	15
(France) CN Marseille	17	14	31
(Spain) KEIO CN Sabadell	12	14	26
(Montenegro) Primorac Kotor	10	15	25
(Serbia) Radnički Kragujevac	14	17	31

Semifinals
(Croatia) Jadran Split	13	14	27
(Hungary) BVSC-Manna ABC	12	12	24
(France) CN Marseille	14	16	30
(Serbia) Radnički Kragujevac	17	11	28

Final
(Croatia) Jadran Split	16	16	32
(France) CN Marseille	19	14	33

== Eighth-finals ==
The first legs were played on 24 February to 7 March, and the second legs were played on 7 March to 14 March.

Team 1	Agg.	Team 2	1st leg	2nd leg
Panathinaikos (Greece)	33–32	(Montenegro) Jadran m:tel Herceg Novi	11–10	22–22 PS
CSM Oradea (Romania)	28–27	(Spain) CN Terrassa	14–13	14–14
KEIO CN Sabadell (Spain)	17–12	(Serbia) VK Šabac	11–3	6–9
CN Barcelona (Spain)	25–32	(Serbia) Radnički Kragujevac	10–15	15–17
RN Savona (Italy)	24–25	(France) CN Marseille	11–12	13–13
Vasas SC (Hungary)	24–28	(Hungary) BVSC-Manna ABC	11–8	13–20
Primorac Kotor (Montenegro)	28–25	(Croatia) Jug AO Dubrovnik	14–13	14–12
Szolnoki Dozsa-Praktiker (Hungary)	24–36	(Croatia) Jadran Split	10–15	14–21

=== Matches ===
24 February 2026; 17:00	Report	Panathinaikos (Greece)	11–10	(Montenegro) Jadran m:tel Herceg Novi	Goudi Swimming Pool, Athens; Referees: David Gomez Pordomingo (ESP), Norbert Ercse (HUN)
24 February 2026; 17:00	Report	Score by quarters: 3–2, 5–3, 1–4, 2–1			Goudi Swimming Pool, Athens; Referees: David Gomez Pordomingo (ESP), Norbert Ercse (HUN)
24 February 2026; 17:00	Report	Papasifakis 3	Goals	Valera 3	Goudi Swimming Pool, Athens; Referees: David Gomez Pordomingo (ESP), Norbert Ercse (HUN)

7 March 2026; 18:00	Report	Jadran m:tel Herceg Novi (Montenegro)	22–22; PSO: 4–5	(Greece) Panathinaikos	Skver Swimming Pool, Herceg Novi; Referees: Raffaele Colombo (ITA), Gernot Haentschel (GER)
7 March 2026; 18:00	Report	Score by quarters: 6–6, 5–5, 5–3, 5–3			Skver Swimming Pool, Herceg Novi; Referees: Raffaele Colombo (ITA), Gernot Haentschel (GER)
7 March 2026; 18:00	Report	Janović 7	Goals	Papasifakis 5	Skver Swimming Pool, Herceg Novi; Referees: Raffaele Colombo (ITA), Gernot Haentschel (GER)

Panathinaikos won 33–32 on aggregate

25 February 2026; 18:00	Report	CSM Oradea (Romania)	14–13	(Spain) CN Terrassa	Bazinul Olimpic Ioan Alexandrescu, Oradea; Referees: Veselin Miskovic (MNE), Ruben Garcia (SUI)
25 February 2026; 18:00	Report	Score by quarters: 3–2, 5–3, 3–3, 3–5			Bazinul Olimpic Ioan Alexandrescu, Oradea; Referees: Veselin Miskovic (MNE), Ruben Garcia (SUI)
25 February 2026; 18:00	Report	Velkic 6	Goals	Cuacos, Sabadell Porcar 3	Bazinul Olimpic Ioan Alexandrescu, Oradea; Referees: Veselin Miskovic (MNE), Ruben Garcia (SUI)

7 March 2026; 18:00	Report	CN Terrassa (Spain)	14–14	(Romania) CSM Oradea	Àrea Olímpica, Terrassa; Referees: Nikolaos Boudramis (GRE), Tomislav Copic (CRO)
7 March 2026; 18:00	Report	Score by quarters: 5–5, 2–3, 2–3, 5–3			Àrea Olímpica, Terrassa; Referees: Nikolaos Boudramis (GRE), Tomislav Copic (CRO)
7 March 2026; 18:00	Report	Ten Broek 4	Goals	Gardašević 5	Àrea Olímpica, Terrassa; Referees: Nikolaos Boudramis (GRE), Tomislav Copic (CRO)

CSM Oradea won 28–27 on aggregate

25 February 2026; 19:00	Report	KEIO CN Sabadell (Spain)	11–3	(Serbia) VK Šabac	Can Llong pool, Sabadell; Referees: Spyridon Achladiotis (GRE), Maxim Gerasimov (GBR)
25 February 2026; 19:00	Report	Score by quarters: 3–0, 2–1, 2–1, 4–1			Can Llong pool, Sabadell; Referees: Spyridon Achladiotis (GRE), Maxim Gerasimov (GBR)
25 February 2026; 19:00	Report	Cabanas 3	Goals	three players 1	Can Llong pool, Sabadell; Referees: Spyridon Achladiotis (GRE), Maxim Gerasimov (GBR)

7 March 2026; 18:00	Report	VK Šabac (Serbia)	9–6	(Spain) KEIO CN Sabadell	Šabac City Swimming Pool, Šabac; Referees: Michiel Zwart (NED), Nora Debreceni (HUN)
7 March 2026; 18:00	Report	Score by quarters: 3–3, 2–1, 3–1, 1–1			Šabac City Swimming Pool, Šabac; Referees: Michiel Zwart (NED), Nora Debreceni (HUN)
7 March 2026; 18:00	Report	three players 2	Goals	Panerai 2	Šabac City Swimming Pool, Šabac; Referees: Michiel Zwart (NED), Nora Debreceni (HUN)

KEIO CN Sabadell won 17–12 on aggregate

25 February 2026; 18:00	Report	CN Barcelona (Spain)	10–15	(Serbia) Radnički Kragujevac	Nova Escullera Sport Center, Barcelona; Referees: Daniele Bianco (ITA), Hendrik Schopp (GER)
25 February 2026; 18:00	Report	Score by quarters: 1–4, 4–1, 3–3, 2–7			Nova Escullera Sport Center, Barcelona; Referees: Daniele Bianco (ITA), Hendrik Schopp (GER)
25 February 2026; 18:00	Report	Daura, Van der Weijden 2	Goals	Rašović 5	Nova Escullera Sport Center, Barcelona; Referees: Daniele Bianco (ITA), Hendrik Schopp (GER)

7 March 2026; 18:00	Report	Radnički Kragujevac (Serbia)	17–15	(Spain) CN Barcelona	Sports Center Park, Kragujevac; Referees: Peter de Jong (NED), Christos Kourtidis (GRE)
7 March 2026; 18:00	Report	Score by quarters: 5–3, 5–3, 4–3, 3–6			Sports Center Park, Kragujevac; Referees: Peter de Jong (NED), Christos Kourtidis (GRE)
7 March 2026; 18:00	Report	Vapenski 5	Goals	Van der Weijden 4	Sports Center Park, Kragujevac; Referees: Peter de Jong (NED), Christos Kourtidis (GRE)

Radnički Kragujevac won 32–25 on aggregate

25 February 2026; 19:00	Report	RN Savona (Italy)	11–12	(France) CN Marseille	Piscina Carlo Zanelli, Savona; Referees: Andrej Franulović (CRO), Alex Mas Marquez (ESP)
25 February 2026; 19:00	Report	Score by quarters: 1–2, 4–4, 4–3, 2–3			Piscina Carlo Zanelli, Savona; Referees: Andrej Franulović (CRO), Alex Mas Marquez (ESP)
25 February 2026; 19:00	Report	Figlioli 6	Goals	Crousillat 5	Piscina Carlo Zanelli, Savona; Referees: Andrej Franulović (CRO), Alex Mas Marquez (ESP)

7 March 2026; 19:00	Report	CN Marseille (France)	13–13	(Italy) RN Savona	Pierre Garsau Pool, Marseille; Referees: Vojin Putnikovic (SRB), Rajmund Fodor (HUN)
7 March 2026; 19:00	Report	Score by quarters: 3–2, 5–5, 4–2, 1–4			Pierre Garsau Pool, Marseille; Referees: Vojin Putnikovic (SRB), Rajmund Fodor (HUN)
7 March 2026; 19:00	Report	Crousillat 5	Goals	Leinweber 5	Pierre Garsau Pool, Marseille; Referees: Vojin Putnikovic (SRB), Rajmund Fodor (HUN)

CN Marseille won 25–24 on aggregate

25 February 2026; 20:00	Report	Vasas SC (Hungary)	11–8	(Hungary) BVSC-Manna ABC	Császár-Komjádi Béla Sport Swimming Pool, Budapest; Referees: Ivan Rakovic (SRB), Mihai Balanescu (ROU)
25 February 2026; 20:00	Report	Score by quarters: 2–2, 3–2, 3–2, 3–2			Császár-Komjádi Béla Sport Swimming Pool, Budapest; Referees: Ivan Rakovic (SRB), Mihai Balanescu (ROU)
25 February 2026; 20:00	Report	Durdic 5	Goals	Kovács 2	Császár-Komjádi Béla Sport Swimming Pool, Budapest; Referees: Ivan Rakovic (SRB), Mihai Balanescu (ROU)

7 March 2026; 18:00	Report	BVSC-Manna ABC (Hungary)	20–13	(Hungary) Vasas SC	Laky Károly Swimming Pool, Budapest; Referees: Jaume Teixido Bermudez (ESP), Stanko Ivanovski (MNE)
7 March 2026; 18:00	Report	Score by quarters: 5–4, 6–3, 4–3, 5–3			Laky Károly Swimming Pool, Budapest; Referees: Jaume Teixido Bermudez (ESP), Stanko Ivanovski (MNE)
7 March 2026; 18:00	Report	Mészáros 4	Goals	Durdic, Szalai 4	Laky Károly Swimming Pool, Budapest; Referees: Jaume Teixido Bermudez (ESP), Stanko Ivanovski (MNE)

BVSC-Manna ABC won 28–24 on aggregate

4 March 2026 (Note: Due to an ongoing refusal from Croatian clubs to play at Kotor's swimming pool since its renaming in commemoration of Zoran Gopčević, it was decided that both games would be at neutral venues in both countries.); 18:00	Report	Primorac Kotor (Montenegro)	14–13	(Croatia) Jug AO Dubrovnik	SC Morača Swimming Pool, Podgorica; Attendance: 300; Referees: Gyorgy Kun (HUN), Konstantinos Vasileiou (GRE)
4 March 2026; 18:00	Report	Score by quarters: 2–4, 4–2, 4–5, 4–2			SC Morača Swimming Pool, Podgorica; Attendance: 300; Referees: Gyorgy Kun (HUN), Konstantinos Vasileiou (GRE)
4 March 2026; 18:00	Report	Radović 3	Goals	Joković 4	SC Morača Swimming Pool, Podgorica; Attendance: 300; Referees: Gyorgy Kun (HUN), Konstantinos Vasileiou (GRE)

14 March 2026; 18:00	Report	Jug AO Dubrovnik (Croatia)	12–14	(Montenegro) Primorac Kotor	Bazen Mladost, Zagreb; Referees: Juan Carlos Ezponda Colominas (ESP), Frank Ohme (GER)
14 March 2026; 18:00	Report	Score by quarters: 1–4, 4–3, 4–4, 3–3			Bazen Mladost, Zagreb; Referees: Juan Carlos Ezponda Colominas (ESP), Frank Ohme (GER)
14 March 2026; 18:00	Report	Pavlić 5	Goals	Mrsic 4	Bazen Mladost, Zagreb; Referees: Juan Carlos Ezponda Colominas (ESP), Frank Ohme (GER)

Primorac Kotor won 28–25 on aggregate

25 February 2026; 18:00	Report	Szolnoki Dozsa-Praktiker (Hungary)	10–15	(Croatia) Jadran Split	Szolnok Water Polo Arena, Szolnok; Referees: Alessia Ferrari (ITA), Tomi Kavcic (SLO)
25 February 2026; 18:00	Report	Score by quarters: 1–2, 4–4, 2–5, 3–4			Szolnok Water Polo Arena, Szolnok; Referees: Alessia Ferrari (ITA), Tomi Kavcic (SLO)
25 February 2026; 18:00	Report	Kovács 4	Goals	Berehulak 5	Szolnok Water Polo Arena, Szolnok; Referees: Alessia Ferrari (ITA), Tomi Kavcic (SLO)

7 March 2026; 18:00	Report	Jadran Split (Croatia)	21–14	(Hungary) Szolnoki Dozsa-Praktiker	Sports Center Poljud, Split; Referees: Alessandro Severo (ITA), Mihnea Alexandrescu (ROU)
7 March 2026; 18:00	Report	Score by quarters: 6–3, 3–0, 7–6, 5–5			Sports Center Poljud, Split; Referees: Alessandro Severo (ITA), Mihnea Alexandrescu (ROU)
7 March 2026; 18:00	Report	Matković, Skejić 4	Goals	Kovács 3	Sports Center Poljud, Split; Referees: Alessandro Severo (ITA), Mihnea Alexandrescu (ROU)

Jadran Split won 36–24 on aggregate

== Quarterfinals ==
The draw was on 9 March 2026. The first legs were played on 18 March, and the second legs were played on 28 March.

Team 1	Agg.	Team 2	1st leg	2nd leg
Primorac Kotor (Montenegro)	25–31	(Serbia) Radnički Kragujevac	9–14	15–17
CN Marseille (France)	31–26	(Spain) KEIO CN Sabadell	17–12	14–14
BVSC-Manna ABC (Hungary)	26–15	(Romania) CSM Oradea	14–8	12–7
Panathinaikos (Greece)	29–30	(Croatia) Jadran Split	10–11	19–19

=== Matches ===
18 March 2026; 18:00	Report	Primorac Kotor (Montenegro)	10–14	(Serbia) Radnički Kragujevac	Zoran Gopčević Swimming Pool, Kotor; Referees: Georgios Stavridis (GRE), Massimo Calabro (ITA)
18 March 2026; 18:00	Report	Score by quarters: 2–3, 2–3, 4–5, 2–3			Zoran Gopčević Swimming Pool, Kotor; Referees: Georgios Stavridis (GRE), Massimo Calabro (ITA)
18 March 2026; 18:00	Report	Ćetković 3	Goals	three players 3	Zoran Gopčević Swimming Pool, Kotor; Referees: Georgios Stavridis (GRE), Massimo Calabro (ITA)

28 March 2026; 20:00	Report	Radnički Kragujevac (Serbia)	17–15	(Montenegro) Primorac Kotor	Sports Center Park, Kragujevac; Referees: Soma Kovacs (HUN), Mihai Balanescu (ROU)
28 March 2026; 20:00	Report	Score by quarters: 3–5, 5–2, 4–4, 5–4			Sports Center Park, Kragujevac; Referees: Soma Kovacs (HUN), Mihai Balanescu (ROU)
28 March 2026; 20:00	Report	Jakšić 4	Goals	Inaba, Vučković 4	Sports Center Park, Kragujevac; Referees: Soma Kovacs (HUN), Mihai Balanescu (ROU)

Radnički Kragujevac won 31–25 on aggregate

18 March 2026; 19:00	Report	CN Marseille (France)	17–12	(Spain) KEIO CN Sabadell	Pierre Garsau Pool, Marseille; Referees: Nikolaos Boudramis (GRE), Ante Bura (CRO)
18 March 2026; 19:00	Report	Score by quarters: 2–3, 6–3, 3–3, 6–3			Pierre Garsau Pool, Marseille; Referees: Nikolaos Boudramis (GRE), Ante Bura (CRO)
18 March 2026; 19:00	Report	Vernoux 4	Goals	Cabanas, Pérez 3	Pierre Garsau Pool, Marseille; Referees: Nikolaos Boudramis (GRE), Ante Bura (CRO)

28 March 2026; 12:0	Report	KEIO CN Sabadell (Spain)	14–14	(France) CN Marseille	Can Llong pool, Sabadell; Referees: Michiel Zwart (NED), Rajmund Fodor (HUN)
28 March 2026; 12:0	Report	Score by quarters: 3–2, 5–5, 2–3, 4–4			Can Llong pool, Sabadell; Referees: Michiel Zwart (NED), Rajmund Fodor (HUN)
28 March 2026; 12:0	Report	six players 2	Goals	Crousillat 5	Can Llong pool, Sabadell; Referees: Michiel Zwart (NED), Rajmund Fodor (HUN)

CN Marseille won 31–26 on aggregate

18 March 2026; 18:00	Report	BVSC-Manna ABC (Hungary)	14–8	(Romania) CSM Oradea	Laky Károly Swimming Pool, Budapest; Referees: Raffaele Colombo (ITA), Ivan Rakovic (SRB)
18 March 2026; 18:00	Report	Score by quarters: 2–3, 5–1, 1–1, 6–3			Laky Károly Swimming Pool, Budapest; Referees: Raffaele Colombo (ITA), Ivan Rakovic (SRB)
18 March 2026; 18:00	Report	Csacsovszky, Ekler 3	Goals	Gardašević 3	Laky Károly Swimming Pool, Budapest; Referees: Raffaele Colombo (ITA), Ivan Rakovic (SRB)

28 March 2026; 19:00	Report	CSM Oradea (Romania)	7–12	(Hungary) BVSC-Manna ABC	Bazinul Olimpic Ioan Alexandrescu, Oradea; Referees: Pau Ferre Segurana (ESP), Sinisa Matijasevic (MNE)
28 March 2026; 19:00	Report	Score by quarters: 0–2, 2–3, 2–4, 3–3			Bazinul Olimpic Ioan Alexandrescu, Oradea; Referees: Pau Ferre Segurana (ESP), Sinisa Matijasevic (MNE)
28 March 2026; 19:00	Report	Velkić 3	Goals	three players 2	Bazinul Olimpic Ioan Alexandrescu, Oradea; Referees: Pau Ferre Segurana (ESP), Sinisa Matijasevic (MNE)

BVSC-Manna ABC won 26–15 on aggregate

19 March 2026; 19:00	Report	Panathinaikos (Greece)	10–11	(Croatia) Jadran Split	Goudi Swimming Pool, Athens; Referees: David Pordomingo Gomez (ESP), Peter de Jong (NED)
19 March 2026; 19:00	Report	Score by quarters: 2–2, 3–2, 1–3, 4–4			Goudi Swimming Pool, Athens; Referees: David Pordomingo Gomez (ESP), Peter de Jong (NED)
19 March 2026; 19:00	Report	Kopeliadis 4	Goals	Marković 5	Goudi Swimming Pool, Athens; Referees: David Pordomingo Gomez (ESP), Peter de Jong (NED)

28 March 2026; 18:00	Report	Jadran Split (Croatia)	19–19	(Greece) Panathinaikos	Sports Center Poljud, Split; Referees: Alessia Ferrari (ITA), Sebastien Dervieux (FRA)
28 March 2026; 18:00	Report	Score by quarters: 4–7, 6–5, 5–5, 4–2			Sports Center Poljud, Split; Referees: Alessia Ferrari (ITA), Sebastien Dervieux (FRA)
28 March 2026; 18:00	Report	Marinić Kragić 7	Goals	Papasifakis 6	Sports Center Poljud, Split; Referees: Alessia Ferrari (ITA), Sebastien Dervieux (FRA)

Jadran Split won 30–29 on aggregate

== Semifinals ==
The first legs were played on 25 April, and the second legs were played on 9 May.

Team 1	Agg.	Team 2	1st leg	2nd leg
Radnički Kragujevac (Serbia)	28–30	(France) CN Marseille	17–14	11–16
Jadran Split (Croatia)	27–24	(Hungary) BVSC-Manna ABC	13–12	14–12

=== Matches ===
25 April 2026; 20:30	Report	Radnički Kragujevac (Serbia)	17–14	(France) CN Marseille	Sports Center Park, Kragujevac; Referees: Alessandro Severo (ITA), Christos Kourtidis (GRE)
25 April 2026; 20:30	Report	Score by quarters: 3–2, 3–5, 7–5, 4–2			Sports Center Park, Kragujevac; Referees: Alessandro Severo (ITA), Christos Kourtidis (GRE)
25 April 2026; 20:30	Report	Rašović 4	Goals	Crousillat, Vernoux 4	Sports Center Park, Kragujevac; Referees: Alessandro Severo (ITA), Christos Kourtidis (GRE)

9 May 2026; 18:00	Report	CN Marseille (France)	16–11	(Serbia) Radnički Kragujevac	Pierre Garsau Pool, Marseille; Referees: Michiel Zwart (NED), Jaume Teixido Bermudez, (ESP)
9 May 2026; 18:00	Report	Score by quarters: 3–2, 4–4, 6–4, 3–1			Pierre Garsau Pool, Marseille; Referees: Michiel Zwart (NED), Jaume Teixido Bermudez, (ESP)
9 May 2026; 18:00	Report	three players 3	Goals	Prlainović 4	Pierre Garsau Pool, Marseille; Referees: Michiel Zwart (NED), Jaume Teixido Bermudez, (ESP)

CN Marseille won 30–28 on aggregate

25 April 2026; 18:00	Report	Jadran Split (Croatia)	13–12	(Hungary) BVSC-Manna ABC	Sports Center Poljud, Split; Referees: Frank Ohme (GER), Pau Ferre Segurana (ESP)
25 April 2026; 18:00	Report	Score by quarters: 1–2, 5–3, 4–2, 3–5			Sports Center Poljud, Split; Referees: Frank Ohme (GER), Pau Ferre Segurana (ESP)
25 April 2026; 18:00	Report	Butić 4	Goals	Ekler 4	Sports Center Poljud, Split; Referees: Frank Ohme (GER), Pau Ferre Segurana (ESP)

9 May 2026; 20:00	Report	BVSC-Manna ABC (Hungary)	12–14	(Croatia) Jadran Split	Laky Károly Swimming Pool, Budapest; Referees: Georgios Stavridis (GRE), Raffaele Colombo (ITA)
9 May 2026; 20:00	Report	Score by quarters: 3–4, 4–3, 2–3, 3–4			Laky Károly Swimming Pool, Budapest; Referees: Georgios Stavridis (GRE), Raffaele Colombo (ITA)
9 May 2026; 20:00	Report	Meszaros 4	Goals	Marinić Kragić 7	Laky Károly Swimming Pool, Budapest; Referees: Georgios Stavridis (GRE), Raffaele Colombo (ITA)

Jadran Split won 27–24 on aggregate

== Final ==
The first leg was played on 23 May, and the second leg was played on 6 June.

Team 1	Agg.	Team 2	1st leg	2nd leg
Jadran Split (Croatia)	32–33	(France) CN Marseille	16–19	16–14

=== Matches ===
23 May 2026; 18:00	Report	CN Marseille (France)	19–16	(Croatia) Jadran Split	Pierre Garsau Pool, Marseille; Referees: Boris Margeta (SLO), Gyorgy Kun (HUN)
23 May 2026; 18:00	Report	Score by quarters: 5–3, 6–3, 6–5, 2–5			Pierre Garsau Pool, Marseille; Referees: Boris Margeta (SLO), Gyorgy Kun (HUN)
23 May 2026; 18:00	Report	Crousillat, Vernoux 4	Goals	Butić 4	Pierre Garsau Pool, Marseille; Referees: Boris Margeta (SLO), Gyorgy Kun (HUN)

6 June 2026; 20:15	Report	Jadran Split (Croatia)	16–14	(France) CN Marseille	Sports Center Poljud, Split; Referees: David Gomez Pordomingo (ESP), Spyridon Achladiotis (GRE)
6 June 2026; 20:15	Report	Score by quarters: 5–5, 5–4, 2–3, 4–2			Sports Center Poljud, Split; Referees: David Gomez Pordomingo (ESP), Spyridon Achladiotis (GRE)
6 June 2026; 20:15	Report	Butić 8	Goals	Vernoux 5	Sports Center Poljud, Split; Referees: David Gomez Pordomingo (ESP), Spyridon Achladiotis (GRE)

CN Marseille won 33–32 on aggregate

== See also ==
- 2025–26 European Aquatics Champions League
- 2025–26 European Aquatics Euro Cup
- 2025–26 European Aquatics Conference Cup
- 2025–26 European Aquatics Challenger Cup
- 2025 European Aquatics Super Cup
- 2025–26 European Aquatics Women's Champions League
- 2025–26 European Aquatics Women's Euro Cup
- 2025–26 European Aquatics Women's Conference Cup
- 2025–26 European Aquatics Women's Challenger Cup
- 2025 European Aquatics Women's Super Cup

Reference
Eighth finals - First leg
Eighth finals - Second leg
Quarter-finals - First leg
Quarter-finals - Second leg
Semi-finals - First leg
Semi-finals - Second leg
Final - First leg
Final - Second leg

Reference
Eighth finals - First leg
Eighth finals - Second leg
Quarter-finals - First leg
Quarter-finals - Second leg
Semi-finals - First leg
Semi-finals - Second leg
Final - First leg
Final - Second leg
