= Rok (given name) =

Rok is a masculine given name, mainly used in Slovenia, cognate to Italian Rocco and Croatian Roko.

Notable people with the name include:

- Rok Baskera (born 1993), Slovenian footballer
- Rok Benkovič (born 1986), Slovenian ski jumper
- Rok Božič (born 1985), Slovenian footballer
- Rok Drakšič (born 1987), Slovenian judoka
- Rok Elsner (born 1986), Slovenian footballer
- Rok Flander (born 1979), Slovenian snowboarder
- Rok Golčar (born 1985), Slovenian handball player
- Rok Golob, Slovenian composer
- Rok Hanžič (born 1981), Slovenian footballer
- Rok Kolander (born 1980), Slovenian rower
- Rok Kopitar (born 1959), Slovenian hurdler
- Rok Kronaveter (born 1986), Slovenian footballer
- Rok Marguč (born 1986), Slovenian snowboarder
- Rok Mordej (born 1989), Slovenian futsal player
- Rok Pajič (born 1985), Slovenian ice hockey player
- Rok Perko (born 1985), Slovenian alpine skier
- Rok Petrovič (1966–1993), Slovenian alpine skier
- Rok Roj (born 1986), Slovenian footballer
- Rok Rozman (born 1988), Slovenian rower
- Rok Stipčević (born 1986), Croatian basketball player
- Rok Štraus (born 1987), Slovenian footballer
- Rok Tičar (born 1989), Slovenian ice hockey player
- Rok Urbanc (born 1985), Slovenian ski jumper
