= Ben Stevenson (water polo) =

American water polo player (born 1995)

Personal information
- Full name: Benjamin Dutch Stevenson
- Nickname: "Benito"
- Born: March 16, 1995 (age 31) Reno, Nevada, U.S.
- Height: 1.93 m (6 ft 4 in)
- Weight: 90 kg (198 lb)

Sport
- Country: United States
- Sport: Water polo
- Position: Attacker
- College team: University of the Pacific (2013–2017)
- Club: Panathinaikos
Medal record
World Cup
Bronze medal – third place	2023 Los Angeles

Benjamin Dutch Stevenson (born March 16, 1995) is an American water polo player. He was a part of Team USA at the 2018 FINA World Cup, where the team finished in sixth place. Stevenson plays Attacker. He is also a graduate of University of the Pacific. He competed in the 2020 Summer Olympics.

== Early life ==
Benjamin Dutch Stevenson was born on March 16, 1995, in Reno, Nevada. He is the son of Marshall and Paige Stevenson. Stevenson attended Reno High School in Reno, Nevada and Coronado High School in Henderson, Nevada.

== College career ==
Stevenson attended university at University of the Pacific and graduated in 2017 with a degree in business. He was teammates with Balázs Erdélyi and Alex Obert.

=== 2013 Freshman ===
On September 7 at Chris Kjeldsen Pool, in a 19–7 win over the Santa Clara Broncos, Stevenson scored his first goal in his first regular season game. In 28 games Stevenson scored 15 goals. He recorded two multi-goal games in the MPSF Semi-finals against USC and Navy.

=== 2014 Sophomore ===
On September 6 and 7 at the Triton Invitational, in wins over Claremont-Mudd-Scripps and Air Force, Stevenson set and tied a then career-high by scoring four goals in a single game. On September 20 at the Kap7 NorCal Classic, in a win over number 11 ranked UC Davis, he registered his first five-goal game. On September 14 against number 10 ranked UC Davis and October 3 against number three ranked Cal, he registered additional four-goal games. On September 26 and 27 at the Aggie Shootout, against Cal Baptist and Cal Lutheran, he also turned in hat tricks as well as another on November 8 against number one ranked UCLA. On October 7, in an 8–7 overtime win over number six ranked UC Santa Barbara, he scored the game-winner. In 26 games, Stevenson led the team with 54 goals, averaging 2.08 goals per game. He scored a goal in every game except for two and also had 16 multi-goal games. He was named to both the MPSF and ACWPC All-Academic teams. After the season, he was named an All-American and was also named Honorable Mention All-MPSF. Over the summer from June 4 to 8 in California, in a four-game series against the Serbian National Team, Stevenson participated with the US Men's National Team.

=== 2015 Junior ===
On September 12 against Iona, October 4 against number seven ranked UC Santa Barbara, October 10 against number four ranked California, and October 17 against number seven ranked UC Irvine, Stevenson tallied four games where he scored at least four goals. He would add eight other hat tricks on the season. On October 11 against number six ranked UC Santa Barbara, Stevenson scored three goals with three assists. Defensively, Stevenson recorded 36 steals. In 28 games, Stevenson scored a team-leading 58 goals and also had 31 assists. He finished sixth in MPSF with 2.07 goals per game. He scored in every game except for four and also had 18 multi-goal games. For his performance, he was named ACWPC Second Team All-American, Second Team All-MPSF, and was also named to the MPSF All-Academic Team.

=== 2016 Senior ===
Stevenson decided to redshirt the 2016 season and return for 2017 as a redshirt senior.

=== 2017 Redshirt Senior ===
On September 2 against Wagner, he had a season-high four assists. On September 17 against San Jose State, September 24 against number six ranked Long Beach State, November 10 against San Jose State, and November 11 against number eight ranked UC Davis, he registered four goals. On November 19 against number seven ranked UC Irvine, he tallied a season-high five steals. Stevenson played in all 27 matches for the Tigers, finishing the season scoring 47 goals along with 42 assists and a total of 89 points. He finished second on the team with 46 steals and ranked in the top five in the conference in points per game (3.30), assists per game (1.56), and steals per game (1.70). He scored a goal in every game except for four and had six hat tricks on the season. After the season he was named an ACWPC All-American. He was also named to the All-Golden Coast Conference Second Team, All-GCC Tournament Team, and earned All-GCC Academic honors.

== Professional career ==
He is currently a member of the Greek water polo club Panathinaikos. Previous clubs in his career include: University of the Pacific, Sydney Uni Water Polo Club, Navarra, CE Mediterrani, Glyfada, Olympic Nice, Circolo Nautico Posillipo.

=== 2020 Summer Olympics ===
On July 26, 2021, in a 20–3 win over South Africa, Stevenson registered a hat trick.
