= Roko Pelicarić =

Croatian water polo player

Personal information
- Nationality: Croatian
- Born: 23 June 1998 (age 28) Zadar, Croatia
- Height: 1.88 m (6 ft 2 in)
- Weight: 86 kg (190 lb)

Sport
- Country: Croatia
- Sport: Water polo
- Club: VK Solaris

Roko Pelicarić (born 23 June 1998) is a Croatian water polo player. He is currently playing for VK Solaris. He is 6 ft 2 in (1.88 m) tall and weighs 190 lb (86 kg).
