= Amy Roko =

- إيمي روكو
- Born: Jeddah, Saudi Arabia
- Occupations: Comedian; rapper; model

Amy Roko (Arabic: إيمي روكو; born 1992/1993) is a Saudi comedian, rapper, and model.

== Early life and education ==
Roko was born in Jeddah, but was raised in Riyadh. She is the eldest of five siblings and has credited her sense of humor to her parents. She earned a degree in medical sciences.

== Career ==
=== Online presence ===
Roko first gained traction online in 2014, when she began posting videos on Vine, and later on Instagram. She later moved to TikTok. In 2016 she began making money through her accounts via brand deals, and by 2018, she was making enough money through social media that she quit her hospital job. By May 2019 she had accumulated 1.3 million Instagram followers.

Roko has been a brand ambassador for New Balance and, from 2025, Maheerah.

=== Television ===
In 2022, Roko was involved in the Warner Bros reality show Dare to Take Risks. Roko was briefly involved with season two of Netflix's Dubai Bling.

=== Music career ===
Roko being rapping in 2020, and posted some of her music on her YouTube channel. She was featured in Benefit Cosmetics' debut music video, "GirlGang!".

Roko released her first single, "Seebee", in 2022. She is the Creative Director of Insomnia Records.

== Awards ==
- BBC 100 Women, 2016
- Middle Eastern Social Media Star (nominee), People's Choice Awards 2022

== Personal life ==
Roko has worn hijab since age 11, and been a niqabi since her early 20s. She has not revealed her legal name online.

Roko has been critical of the Saudi government's restrictions on women, including the ban on women drivers, which was lifted in 2018.
