= 2024–25 European Aquatics Women's Champions League qualification round =

Tournament information
- Sport: Water polo
- Dates: 3–6 October 2024
- Teams: 25
- Website: Official website

The 2024–25 European Aquatics Women's Champions League qualification round is played between 3 and 6 October 2024 to determine the 11 teams advancing to the Main round of the 2024–25 European Aquatics Women's Champions League.

== Format ==
The 30 teams were place into five groups of five teams. In each group, teams will play against each other once in a round-robin format. The top two plus the best third place team advanced to the Main round.

Teams are ranked according to points (3 points for a win, 2 points for a penalty shootout win, 1 point for a penalty shootout loss, 0 points for a loss), and if tied on points, the following tiebreaking criteria are applied, in the order given, to determine the rankings:

- Points in head-to-head matches among tied teams;
- Goal difference in head-to-head matches among tied teams;
- Goals scored in head-to-head matches among tied teams;
- Goal difference in all group matches;
- Goals scored in all group matches.

== Draw ==
The draw took place in Zagreb on 13 August 2024. The seeding was based on the women's club rankings. Teams that are unranked are seeded based on their nations' ranking. The only restriction was that clubs from the same country could not be drawn against each other. H indicates which clubs is hosting a group. Teams in bold advanced to the Main round.

Key to colours
Group winners advance to **Main round**

Pot 1
Team	Ranking	Points
(Hungary) Dunaújváros	5	25,295
(Italy) Antenore Plebiscito Padova	7	22,877.5
(Greece) NO Vouliagmeni	8	21,972.5
(Italy) SIS Roma	10	19,425
(Hungary) FTC Telekom	11	19,047.5

Pot 2
Team	Ranking	Points
(Spain) CN Terrassa	12	18,745
(Greece) Ethnikos Piraeus	13	18,510
(Greece) ANC Glyfada	14	16,440
(Spain) CN Sant Andreu	15	13,695
(France) Lille UC	16	13,672.5

Pot 3
Team	Ranking	Points
(Hungary) Digi Eger	17	10,310
(Greece) Alimos NAC Betsson	18	9,840
(Netherlands) ZV De Zaan	20	9,305
(Hungary) BVSC-Zugló	21	9,302.5
(Germany) Spandau 04	22	8,290

Pot 4
Team	Ranking	Points
(Italy) Pallanuoto Trieste	23	6,750
(France) Grand Nancy AC	24	6,105
(Spain) EPlus CN Catalunya	N/A	0
(Spain) Tenerife Echeyde	N/A	0
(Greece) Panionios GSS	N/A	0

Pot 5
Team	Ranking	Points
(Hungary) III. Keruleti TVE	N/A	0
(Italy) Rapallo Pallanuoto	N/A	0
(Netherlands) Polar Bears	N/A	0
(Netherlands) Widex GZC Donk	N/A	0
(Israel) Hapoel Yoneam	N/A	0

== Groups ==
=== Group A ===
- 3–6 October 2024, Athens, Greece.

Pos	Team	Pld	W	PSW	PSL	L	GF	GA	GD	Pts	Qualification	(Hungary) FTC	(Spain) SAN	(Netherlands) ZAAN	(Greece) PAN	(Italy) RAP
1	(Hungary) FTC Telekom	4	4	0	0	0	48	33	+15	12	Main round	—	9–8	17–8	—	—
2	(Spain) CN Sant Andreu	4	3	0	0	1	51	33	+18	9	Main round	—	—	—	16–7	15–10
3	(Netherlands) ZV De Zaan	4	2	0	0	2	45	46	−1	6	Euro Cup	—	7–12	—	—	16–10
4	(Greece) Panionios GSS (H)	4	1	0	0	3	38	54	−16	3	Euro Cup	6–10	—	7–14	—	—
5	(Italy) Rapallo Pallanuoto	4	0	0	0	4	45	61	−16	0	Euro Cup	11–12	—	—	14–18	—

Source: European Aquatics
(H) Host

3 October 2024; 18:30	Report	ZV De Zaan (Netherlands)	16–10	(Italy) Rapallo Pallanuoto	Nea Smyrni Swimming Pool, Athens; Referees: Martina Kunikova (SVK), Ilkin Cakmakoglu (TUR)
3 October 2024; 18:30	Report	Score by quarters: 3–0, 6–2, 3–6, 4–2			Nea Smyrni Swimming Pool, Athens; Referees: Martina Kunikova (SVK), Ilkin Cakmakoglu (TUR)
3 October 2024; 18:30	Report	Rogge 5	Goals	Kudella 4	Nea Smyrni Swimming Pool, Athens; Referees: Martina Kunikova (SVK), Ilkin Cakmakoglu (TUR)

3 October 2024; 20:30	Report	Panionios GSS (Greece)	6–10	(Hungary) FTC Telekom	Nea Smyrni Swimming Pool, Athens; Referees: Ivanka Rakovic Krstonosic (SRB), Philip Uhlig (GER)
3 October 2024; 20:30	Report	Score by quarters: 1–2, 2–2, 3–3, 0–3			Nea Smyrni Swimming Pool, Athens; Referees: Ivanka Rakovic Krstonosic (SRB), Philip Uhlig (GER)
3 October 2024; 20:30	Report	Douli, Bitsakou 2	Goals	Gurisatti 3	Nea Smyrni Swimming Pool, Athens; Referees: Ivanka Rakovic Krstonosic (SRB), Philip Uhlig (GER)

4 October 2024; 18:30	Report	FTC Telekom (Hungary)	17–8	(Netherlands) ZV De Zaan	Nea Smyrni Swimming Pool, Athens; Referees: Ivanka Rakovic Krstonosic (SRB), Ilkin Cakmakoglu (TUR)
4 October 2024; 18:30	Report	Score by quarters: 5–2, 3–2, 4–2, 5–2			Nea Smyrni Swimming Pool, Athens; Referees: Ivanka Rakovic Krstonosic (SRB), Ilkin Cakmakoglu (TUR)
4 October 2024; 18:30	Report	Plevritou 4	Goals	Rogge 5	Nea Smyrni Swimming Pool, Athens; Referees: Ivanka Rakovic Krstonosic (SRB), Ilkin Cakmakoglu (TUR)

4 October 2024; 20:30	Report	CN Sant Andreu (Spain)	16–7	(Greece) Panionios GSS	Nea Smyrni Swimming Pool, Athens; Referees: Martina Kunikova (SVK), Philip Uhlig (GER)
4 October 2024; 20:30	Report	Score by quarters: 2–3, 3–3, 7–0, 4–1			Nea Smyrni Swimming Pool, Athens; Referees: Martina Kunikova (SVK), Philip Uhlig (GER)
4 October 2024; 20:30	Report	Farre Colomina, Ruiz 4	Goals	three players 2	Nea Smyrni Swimming Pool, Athens; Referees: Martina Kunikova (SVK), Philip Uhlig (GER)

5 October 2024; 10:00	Report	ZV De Zaan (Netherlands)	7–12	(Spain) CN Sant Andreu	Nea Smyrni Swimming Pool, Athens; Referees: Philip Uhlig (GER), Ilkin Cakmakoglu (TUR)
5 October 2024; 10:00	Report	Score by quarters: 2–4, 1–2, 1–2, 3–4			Nea Smyrni Swimming Pool, Athens; Referees: Philip Uhlig (GER), Ilkin Cakmakoglu (TUR)
5 October 2024; 10:00	Report	Rogge 3	Goals	Cordobés 3	Nea Smyrni Swimming Pool, Athens; Referees: Philip Uhlig (GER), Ilkin Cakmakoglu (TUR)

5 October 2024; 12:00	Report	Rapallo Pallanuoto (Italy)	11–12	(Hungary) FTC Telekom	Nea Smyrni Swimming Pool, Athens; Referees: Martina Kunikova (SVK), Ivanka Rakovic Krstonosic (SRB)
5 October 2024; 12:00	Report	Score by quarters: 3–2, 3–5, 3–4, 2–1			Nea Smyrni Swimming Pool, Athens; Referees: Martina Kunikova (SVK), Ivanka Rakovic Krstonosic (SRB)
5 October 2024; 12:00	Report	Zanetta 4	Goals	Gurisatti, Plevritou 3	Nea Smyrni Swimming Pool, Athens; Referees: Martina Kunikova (SVK), Ivanka Rakovic Krstonosic (SRB)

5 October 2024; 18:30	Report	Panionios GSS (Greece)	7–14	(Netherlands) ZV De Zaan	Nea Smyrni Swimming Pool, Athens; Referees: Martina Kunikova (SVK), Ilkin Cakmakoglu (TUR)
5 October 2024; 18:30	Report	Score by quarters: 2–4, 1–3, 1–4, 3–3			Nea Smyrni Swimming Pool, Athens; Referees: Martina Kunikova (SVK), Ilkin Cakmakoglu (TUR)
5 October 2024; 18:30	Report	Arima, Papanastasiou 2	Goals	Rogge 5	Nea Smyrni Swimming Pool, Athens; Referees: Martina Kunikova (SVK), Ilkin Cakmakoglu (TUR)

5 October 2024; 20:30	Report	CN Sant Andreu (Spain)	15–10	(Italy) Rapallo Pallanuoto	Nea Smyrni Swimming Pool, Athens; Referees: Ivanka Rakovic Krstonosic (SRB), Philip Uhlig (GER)
5 October 2024; 20:30	Report	Score by quarters: 2–2, 6–1, 3–2, 4–5			Nea Smyrni Swimming Pool, Athens; Referees: Ivanka Rakovic Krstonosic (SRB), Philip Uhlig (GER)
5 October 2024; 20:30	Report	Ruiz 4	Goals	Bianconi 4	Nea Smyrni Swimming Pool, Athens; Referees: Ivanka Rakovic Krstonosic (SRB), Philip Uhlig (GER)

6 October 2024; 10:00	Report	FTC Telekom (Hungary)	9–8	(Spain) CN Sant Andreu	Nea Smyrni Swimming Pool, Athens; Referees: Martina Kunikova (SVK), Philip Uhlig (GER)
6 October 2024; 10:00	Report	Score by quarters: 2–2, 3–2, 2–4, 2–0			Nea Smyrni Swimming Pool, Athens; Referees: Martina Kunikova (SVK), Philip Uhlig (GER)
6 October 2024; 10:00	Report	three players 2	Goals	Pérez, Ruiz Barril 2	Nea Smyrni Swimming Pool, Athens; Referees: Martina Kunikova (SVK), Philip Uhlig (GER)

6 October 2024; 12:00	Report	Rapallo Pallanuoto (Italy)	14–18	(Greece) Panionios GSS	Nea Smyrni Swimming Pool, Athens; Referees: Ivanka Rakovic Krstonosic (SRB), Ilkin Cakmakoglu (TUR)
6 October 2024; 12:00	Report	Score by quarters: 3–3, 3–4, 6–5, 2–6			Nea Smyrni Swimming Pool, Athens; Referees: Ivanka Rakovic Krstonosic (SRB), Ilkin Cakmakoglu (TUR)
6 October 2024; 12:00	Report	Galardi 5	Goals	Arima 7	Nea Smyrni Swimming Pool, Athens; Referees: Ivanka Rakovic Krstonosic (SRB), Ilkin Cakmakoglu (TUR)

=== Group B ===
- 3–6 October 2024, Ede, Netherlands.

Pos	Team	Pld	W	PSW	PSL	L	GF	GA	GD	Pts	Qualification	(Netherlands) POL	(Hungary) ZUG	(Hungary) DUN	(France) LIL	(France) NAN
1	(Netherlands) Polar Bears (H)	4	3	0	0	1	67	50	+17	9 (Note: Head-to-head goal difference: Polar Bears +8, Dunaújváros +3, BVSC-Zugló –8. Despite the goal difference, BVSC-Zugló is ranked ahead of Dunaújváros due to the match between them.)	Main round	—	21–12	10–14	19–12	17–12
2	(Hungary) BVSC-Zugló	4	3	0	0	1	62	51	+11	9	Main round	—	—	11–10	17–13	22–7
3	(Hungary) Dunaújváros	4	3	0	0	1	58	37	+21	9	Main round	—	—	—	—	—
4	(France) Lille UC	4	1	0	0	3	54	63	−9	3	Euro Cup	—	—	10–16	—	19–11
5	(France) Grand Nancy AC	4	0	0	0	4	36	76	−40	0	Euro Cup	—	—	6–18	—	—

Source: European Aquatics
(H) Host
Notes:

3 October 2024; 18:30	Report	BVSC-Zugló (Hungary)	22–7	(France) Grand Nancy AC	Zwembad De Peppel, Ede; Referees: Giuliana Nicolosi (ITA), Natalia Markopoulou (GRE)
3 October 2024; 18:30	Report	Score by quarters: 6–3, 7–2, 5–1, 4–1			Zwembad De Peppel, Ede; Referees: Giuliana Nicolosi (ITA), Natalia Markopoulou (GRE)
3 October 2024; 18:30	Report	Armai 6	Goals	three players 2	Zwembad De Peppel, Ede; Referees: Giuliana Nicolosi (ITA), Natalia Markopoulou (GRE)

3 October 2024; 20:30	Report	Polar Bears (Netherlands)	19–12	(France) Lille UC	Zwembad De Peppel, Ede; Referees: Marta Cabanas (ESP), Mihnea Ioan Alexandrescu (ROU)
3 October 2024; 20:30	Report	Score by quarters: 4–2, 5–4, 5–4, 5–2			Zwembad De Peppel, Ede; Referees: Marta Cabanas (ESP), Mihnea Ioan Alexandrescu (ROU)
3 October 2024; 20:30	Report	De Kleer 4	Goals	Muscy 4	Zwembad De Peppel, Ede; Referees: Marta Cabanas (ESP), Mihnea Ioan Alexandrescu (ROU)

4 October 2024; 18:30	Report	BVSC-Zugló (Hungary)	17–13	(France) Lille UC	Zwembad De Peppel, Ede; Referees: Giuliana Nicolosi (ITA), Mihnea Ioan Alexandrescu (ROU)
4 October 2024; 18:30	Report	Score by quarters: 5–1, 5–4, 5–4, 2–4			Zwembad De Peppel, Ede; Referees: Giuliana Nicolosi (ITA), Mihnea Ioan Alexandrescu (ROU)
4 October 2024; 18:30	Report	Armai 4	Goals	Andres 5	Zwembad De Peppel, Ede; Referees: Giuliana Nicolosi (ITA), Mihnea Ioan Alexandrescu (ROU)

4 October 2024; 20:30	Report	Polar Bears (Netherlands)	10–14	(Hungary) Dunaújváros	Zwembad De Peppel, Ede; Referees: Marta Cabanas (ESP), Natalia Markopoulou (GRE)
4 October 2024; 20:30	Report	Score by quarters: 0–1, 3–5, 2–5, 5–3			Zwembad De Peppel, Ede; Referees: Marta Cabanas (ESP), Natalia Markopoulou (GRE)
4 October 2024; 20:30	Report	Bosveld, De Kleer 3	Goals	Garda 7	Zwembad De Peppel, Ede; Referees: Marta Cabanas (ESP), Natalia Markopoulou (GRE)

5 October 2024; 09:30	Report	Lille UC (France)	19–11	(France) Grand Nancy AC	Zwembad De Peppel, Ede; Referees: Natalia Markopoulou (GRE), Mihnea Ioan Alexandrescu (ROU)
5 October 2024; 09:30	Report	Score by quarters: 6–1, 4–2, 5–5, 4–3			Zwembad De Peppel, Ede; Referees: Natalia Markopoulou (GRE), Mihnea Ioan Alexandrescu (ROU)
5 October 2024; 09:30	Report	Durán 4	Goals	Martella 4	Zwembad De Peppel, Ede; Referees: Natalia Markopoulou (GRE), Mihnea Ioan Alexandrescu (ROU)

5 October 2024; 11:30	Report	BVSC-Zugló (Hungary)	11–	(Hungary) Dunaújváros	Zwembad De Peppel, Ede; Referees: Marta Cabanas (ESP), Giuliana Nicolosi (ITA)
5 October 2024; 11:30	Report	Score by quarters: 3–4, 2–1, 2–2, 4–3			Zwembad De Peppel, Ede; Referees: Marta Cabanas (ESP), Giuliana Nicolosi (ITA)
5 October 2024; 11:30	Report	Armai 3	Goals	Garda 3	Zwembad De Peppel, Ede; Referees: Marta Cabanas (ESP), Giuliana Nicolosi (ITA)

5 October 2024; 18:30	Report	Grand Nancy AC (France)	6–18	(Hungary) Dunaújváros	Zwembad De Peppel, Ede; Referees: Marta Cabanas (ESP), Giuliana Nicolosi (ITA)
5 October 2024; 18:30	Report	Score by quarters: 1–5, 1–3, 2–6, 2–4			Zwembad De Peppel, Ede; Referees: Marta Cabanas (ESP), Giuliana Nicolosi (ITA)
5 October 2024; 18:30	Report	three players 2	Goals	three players 3	Zwembad De Peppel, Ede; Referees: Marta Cabanas (ESP), Giuliana Nicolosi (ITA)

5 October 2024; 20:30	Report	Polar Bears (Netherlands)	21–12	(Hungary) BVSC-Zugló	Zwembad De Peppel, Ede; Referees: Mihnea Ioan Alexandrescu (ROU), Natalia Markopoulou (GRE)
5 October 2024; 20:30	Report	Score by quarters: 4–5, 6–2, 7–3, 4–2			Zwembad De Peppel, Ede; Referees: Mihnea Ioan Alexandrescu (ROU), Natalia Markopoulou (GRE)
5 October 2024; 20:30	Report	Willemsen 6	Goals	Armai, Dalma 3	Zwembad De Peppel, Ede; Referees: Mihnea Ioan Alexandrescu (ROU), Natalia Markopoulou (GRE)

6 October 2024; 10:00	Report	Lille UC (France)	10–16	(Hungary) Dunaújváros	Zwembad De Peppel, Ede; Referees: Giuliana Nicolosi (ITA), Marta Cabanas (ESP)
6 October 2024; 10:00	Report	Score by quarters: 2–3, 1–5, 4–5, 3–3			Zwembad De Peppel, Ede; Referees: Giuliana Nicolosi (ITA), Marta Cabanas (ESP)
6 October 2024; 10:00	Report	Romero 3	Goals	Dobi, Sumagi	Zwembad De Peppel, Ede; Referees: Giuliana Nicolosi (ITA), Marta Cabanas (ESP)

6 October 2024; 12:00	Report	Polar Bears (Netherlands)	17–12	(France) Grand Nancy AC	Zwembad De Peppel, Ede; Referees: Mihnea Ioan Alexandrescu (ROU), Natalia Markopoulou (GRE)
6 October 2024; 12:00	Report	Score by quarters: 2–1, 4–2, 3–4, 8–5			Zwembad De Peppel, Ede; Referees: Mihnea Ioan Alexandrescu (ROU), Natalia Markopoulou (GRE)
6 October 2024; 12:00	Report	Bosveld, Wolves 5	Goals	Kinga 6	Zwembad De Peppel, Ede; Referees: Mihnea Ioan Alexandrescu (ROU), Natalia Markopoulou (GRE)

=== Group C ===
- 3–6 October 2024, Padua, Italy.

Pos	Team	Pld	W	PSW	PSL	L	GF	GA	GD	Pts	Qualification	(Greece) ALI	(Italy) PAD	(Spain) TEN	(Greece) ETH	(Israel) HAP
1	(Greece) Alimos NAC Betsson	4	4	0	0	0	71	38	+33	12	Main round	—	—	—	16–10	18–9
2	(Italy) Antenore Plebiscito Padova (H)	4	3	0	0	1	55	47	+8	9	Main round	10–17	—	13–11	13–8	19–11
3	(Spain) Tenerife Echeyde	4	2	0	0	2	44	52	−8	6	Euro Cup	9–20	—	—	—	—
4	(Greece) Ethnikos Piraeus	4	1	0	0	3	43	57	−14	3	Euro Cup	—	—	9–11	—	16–15
5	(Israel) Hapoel Yoneam	4	0	0	0	4	45	64	−19	0	Euro Cup	—	—	10–11	—	—

Source: European Aquatics
(H) Host

3 October 2024; 18:00	Report	Antenore Plebiscito Padova (Italy)	19–11	(Israel) Hapoel Yoneam	Centro Sportivo Plebiscito, Padua; Referees: Marieke Van de Berg (NED), Luis Santos (POR)
3 October 2024; 18:00	Report	Score by quarters: 5–3, 6–2, 4–3, 4–3			Centro Sportivo Plebiscito, Padua; Referees: Marieke Van de Berg (NED), Luis Santos (POR)
3 October 2024; 18:00	Report	Millo, Pedley 4	Goals	Bogachenko 4	Centro Sportivo Plebiscito, Padua; Referees: Marieke Van de Berg (NED), Luis Santos (POR)

3 October 2024; 20:00	Report	Alimos NAC Betsson (Greece)	16–10	(Greece) Ethnikos Piraeus	Centro Sportivo Plebiscito, Padua; Referees: Nora Debreceni (HUN), Anne Grandin (FRA)
3 October 2024; 20:00	Report	Score by quarters: 4–3, 7–0, 1–4, 4–3			Centro Sportivo Plebiscito, Padua; Referees: Nora Debreceni (HUN), Anne Grandin (FRA)
3 October 2024; 20:00	Report	Marletta 5	Goals	Mamoglou 4	Centro Sportivo Plebiscito, Padua; Referees: Nora Debreceni (HUN), Anne Grandin (FRA)

4 October 2024; 18:00	Report	Ethnikos Piraeus (Greece)	16–15	(Israel) Hapoel Yoneam	Centro Sportivo Plebiscito, Padua; Referees: Luis Santos (POR), Nora Debreceni (HUN)
4 October 2024; 18:00	Report	Score by quarters: 4–5, 5–4, 2–4, 5–2			Centro Sportivo Plebiscito, Padua; Referees: Luis Santos (POR), Nora Debreceni (HUN)
4 October 2024; 18:00	Report	Kanetidou 3	Goals	Bogachenko 4	Centro Sportivo Plebiscito, Padua; Referees: Luis Santos (POR), Nora Debreceni (HUN)

4 October 2024; 20:00	Report	Antenore Plebiscito Padova (Italy)	13–11	(Spain) Tenerife Echeyde	Centro Sportivo Plebiscito, Padua; Referees: Anne Grandin (FRA), Marieke Van de Berg (NED)
4 October 2024; 20:00	Report	Score by quarters: 5–3, 5–2, 1–2, 2–4			Centro Sportivo Plebiscito, Padua; Referees: Anne Grandin (FRA), Marieke Van de Berg (NED)
4 October 2024; 20:00	Report	Pedley, Schaap 3	Goals	Ramos Fernandez 3	Centro Sportivo Plebiscito, Padua; Referees: Anne Grandin (FRA), Marieke Van de Berg (NED)

5 October 2024; 10:00	Report	Alimos NAC Betsson (Greece)	18–9	(Israel) Hapoel Yoneam	Centro Sportivo Plebiscito, Padua; Referees: Anne Grandin (FRA), Luis Santos (POR)
5 October 2024; 10:00	Report	Score by quarters: 6–3, 3–1, 3–1, 6–4			Centro Sportivo Plebiscito, Padua; Referees: Anne Grandin (FRA), Luis Santos (POR)
5 October 2024; 10:00	Report	Asimaki, Marletta 4	Goals	Bogachenko 4	Centro Sportivo Plebiscito, Padua; Referees: Anne Grandin (FRA), Luis Santos (POR)

5 October 2024; 12:00	Report	Ethnikos Piraeus (Greece)	9–13	(Spain) Tenerife Echeyde	Centro Sportivo Plebiscito, Padua; Referees: Marieke Van de Berg (NED), Nora Debreceni (HUN)
5 October 2024; 12:00	Report	Score by quarters: 3–2, 0–4, 2–4, 4–3			Centro Sportivo Plebiscito, Padua; Referees: Marieke Van de Berg (NED), Nora Debreceni (HUN)
5 October 2024; 12:00	Report	three players 2	Goals	Naya Manero 4	Centro Sportivo Plebiscito, Padua; Referees: Marieke Van de Berg (NED), Nora Debreceni (HUN)

5 October 2024; 18:00	Report	Tenerife Echeyde (Spain)	9–20	(Greece) Alimos NAC Betsson	Centro Sportivo Plebiscito, Padua; Referees: Luis Santos (POR), Marieke Van de Berg (NED)
5 October 2024; 18:00	Report	Score by quarters: 2–6, 2–4, 3–7, 2–3			Centro Sportivo Plebiscito, Padua; Referees: Luis Santos (POR), Marieke Van de Berg (NED)
5 October 2024; 18:00	Report	Naya Manero 4	Goals	Marletta 5	Centro Sportivo Plebiscito, Padua; Referees: Luis Santos (POR), Marieke Van de Berg (NED)

5 October 2024; 20:00	Report	Antenore Plebiscito Padova (Italy)	13–8	(Greece) Ethnikos Piraeus	Centro Sportivo Plebiscito, Padua; Referees: Anne Grandin (FRA), Nora Debreceni (HUN)
5 October 2024; 20:00	Report	Score by quarters: 1–2, 5–3, 4–2, 3–1			Centro Sportivo Plebiscito, Padua; Referees: Anne Grandin (FRA), Nora Debreceni (HUN)
5 October 2024; 20:00	Report	Pedley 4	Goals	Kanetidou 3	Centro Sportivo Plebiscito, Padua; Referees: Anne Grandin (FRA), Nora Debreceni (HUN)

6 October 2024; 10:00	Report	Hapoel Yoneam (Israel)	10–11	(Spain) Tenerife Echeyde	Centro Sportivo Plebiscito, Padua; Referees: Marieke Van de Berg (NED), Anne Grandin (FRA)
6 October 2024; 10:00	Report	Score by quarters: 2–4, 1–1, 3–3, 4–3			Centro Sportivo Plebiscito, Padua; Referees: Marieke Van de Berg (NED), Anne Grandin (FRA)
6 October 2024; 10:00	Report	Bogachenko, Yaacobi 3	Goals	Dempsey, Ramos Fernandez 3	Centro Sportivo Plebiscito, Padua; Referees: Marieke Van de Berg (NED), Anne Grandin (FRA)

6 October 2024; 12:00	Report	Antenore Plebiscito Padova (Italy)	10–17	(Greece) Alimos NAC Betsson	Centro Sportivo Plebiscito, Padua; Referees: Nora Debreceni (HUN), Luis Santos (POR)
6 October 2024; 12:00	Report	Score by quarters: 0–5, 2–4, 2–2, 6–6			Centro Sportivo Plebiscito, Padua; Referees: Nora Debreceni (HUN), Luis Santos (POR)
6 October 2024; 12:00	Report	Millo 4	Goals	four players 3	Centro Sportivo Plebiscito, Padua; Referees: Nora Debreceni (HUN), Luis Santos (POR)

=== Group D ===
- 3–6 October 2024, Eger, Hungary.

Pos	Team	Pld	W	PSW	PSL	L	GF	GA	GD	Pts	Qualification	(Spain) TER	(Italy) ROM	(Italy) TRI	(Hungary) EGER	(Hungary) KER
1	(Spain) CN Terrassa	4	4	0	0	0	66	46	+20	12	Main round	—	14–13	15–9	—	—
2	(Italy) SIS Roma	4	3	0	0	1	57	45	+12	9	Main round	—	—	—	—	—
3	(Italy) Pallanuoto Trieste	4	1	1	0	2	51	56	−5	5	Euro Cup	—	9–11	—	—	14–13
4	(Hungary) Digi Eger (H)	4	1	0	1	2	52	63	−11	4	Euro Cup	10–19	12–15	17–19 (Note: Match ended 14–14, Pallanuoto Trieste won 5–3 on penalties)	—	13–10
5	(Hungary) III. Keruleti TVE	4	0	0	0	4	47	63	−16	0	Euro Cup	14–18	10–18	—	—	—

Source: European Aquatics
(H) Host

3 October 2024; 18:30	Report	Pallanuoto Trieste (Italy)	9–11	(Italy) SIS Roma	Bitskey Aladár Swimming Pool, Eger; Referees: Maria Daskalopoulou (GRE), Aurely Blanchard (FRA)
3 October 2024; 18:30	Report	Score by quarters: 2–4, 0–1, 4–4, 3–2			Bitskey Aladár Swimming Pool, Eger; Referees: Maria Daskalopoulou (GRE), Aurely Blanchard (FRA)
3 October 2024; 18:30	Report	Cordovani 3	Goals	Centanni 4	Bitskey Aladár Swimming Pool, Eger; Referees: Maria Daskalopoulou (GRE), Aurely Blanchard (FRA)

3 October 2024; 20:30	Report	Digi Eger (Hungary)	10–19	(Spain) CN Terrassa	Bitskey Aladár Swimming Pool, Eger; Referees: Lea Saftic (CRO), Sander Gransjean (NED)
3 October 2024; 20:30	Report	Score by quarters: 3–6, 1–4, 3–4, 3–5			Bitskey Aladár Swimming Pool, Eger; Referees: Lea Saftic (CRO), Sander Gransjean (NED)
3 October 2024; 20:30	Report	Lendvai 4	Goals	Piralkova Coello, Prats Rodriguez 5	Bitskey Aladár Swimming Pool, Eger; Referees: Lea Saftic (CRO), Sander Gransjean (NED)

4 October 2024; 18:30	Report	Pallanuoto Trieste (Italy)	14–13	(Hungary) III. Keruleti TVE	Bitskey Aladár Swimming Pool, Eger; Referees: Sander Gransjean (NED), Maria Daskalopoulou (GRE)
4 October 2024; 18:30	Report	Score by quarters: 7–3, 2–4, 3–3, 2–3			Bitskey Aladár Swimming Pool, Eger; Referees: Sander Gransjean (NED), Maria Daskalopoulou (GRE)
4 October 2024; 18:30	Report	Cordovani, Gragnolati 3	Goals	Toth 5	Bitskey Aladár Swimming Pool, Eger; Referees: Sander Gransjean (NED), Maria Daskalopoulou (GRE)

4 October 2024; 20:30	Report	Digi Eger (Hungary)	12–15	(Italy) SIS Roma	Bitskey Aladár Swimming Pool, Eger; Referees: Aurely Blanchard (FRA), Lea Saftic (CRO)
4 October 2024; 20:30	Report	Score by quarters: 1–3, 5–3, 3–4, 3–5			Bitskey Aladár Swimming Pool, Eger; Referees: Aurely Blanchard (FRA), Lea Saftic (CRO)
4 October 2024; 20:30	Report	Lendvai 4	Goals	Chiappini 6	Bitskey Aladár Swimming Pool, Eger; Referees: Aurely Blanchard (FRA), Lea Saftic (CRO)

5 October 2024; 10:00	Report	CN Terrassa (Spain)	15–9	(Italy) Pallanuoto Trieste	Bitskey Aladár Swimming Pool, Eger; Referees: Lea Saftic (CRO), Maria Daskalopoulou (GRE)
5 October 2024; 10:00	Report	Score by quarters: 2–3, 4–4, 5–0, 4–2			Bitskey Aladár Swimming Pool, Eger; Referees: Lea Saftic (CRO), Maria Daskalopoulou (GRE)
5 October 2024; 10:00	Report	Piralkova Coello 5	Goals	Gragnolati 4	Bitskey Aladár Swimming Pool, Eger; Referees: Lea Saftic (CRO), Maria Daskalopoulou (GRE)

5 October 2024; 12:00	Report	III. Keruleti TVE (Hungary)	10–18	(Italy) SIS Roma	Bitskey Aladár Swimming Pool, Eger; Referees: Sander Gransjean (NED), Aurely Blanchard (FRA)
5 October 2024; 12:00	Report	Score by quarters: 3–5, 2–4, 4–4, 1–5			Bitskey Aladár Swimming Pool, Eger; Referees: Sander Gransjean (NED), Aurely Blanchard (FRA)
5 October 2024; 12:00	Report	Hajdu, Rajna 3	Goals	Papi	Bitskey Aladár Swimming Pool, Eger; Referees: Sander Gransjean (NED), Aurely Blanchard (FRA)

5 October 2024; 18:30	Report	Digi Eger (Hungary)	17–19 (PSO)	(Italy) Pallanuoto Trieste	Bitskey Aladár Swimming Pool, Eger; Referees: Maria Daskalopoulou (GRE), Sander Gransjean (NED)
5 October 2024; 18:30	Report	Score by quarters: 2–4, 5–2, 4–4, 3–4 PSO: 3–5			Bitskey Aladár Swimming Pool, Eger; Referees: Maria Daskalopoulou (GRE), Sander Gransjean (NED)
5 October 2024; 18:30	Report	Szilágyi 5	Goals	Cordovani 4	Bitskey Aladár Swimming Pool, Eger; Referees: Maria Daskalopoulou (GRE), Sander Gransjean (NED)

5 October 2024; 20:30	Report	III. Keruleti TVE (Hungary)	14–18	(Spain) CN Terrassa	Bitskey Aladár Swimming Pool, Eger; Referees: Aurely Blanchard (FRA), Lea Saftic (CRO)
5 October 2024; 20:30	Report	Score by quarters: 4–6, 3–5, 5–5, 2–2			Bitskey Aladár Swimming Pool, Eger; Referees: Aurely Blanchard (FRA), Lea Saftic (CRO)
5 October 2024; 20:30	Report	Gyöngyössy 4	Goals	three players 4	Bitskey Aladár Swimming Pool, Eger; Referees: Aurely Blanchard (FRA), Lea Saftic (CRO)

6 October 2024; 11:00	Report	CN Terrassa (Spain)	14–13	(Italy) SIS Roma	Bitskey Aladár Swimming Pool, Eger; Referees: Aurely Blanchard (FRA), Maria Daskalopoulou (GRE)
6 October 2024; 11:00	Report	Score by quarters: 4–1, 3–4, 3–3, 4–5			Bitskey Aladár Swimming Pool, Eger; Referees: Aurely Blanchard (FRA), Maria Daskalopoulou (GRE)
6 October 2024; 11:00	Report	Piralkova Coello 5	Goals	Chiappini, Picozzi 5	Bitskey Aladár Swimming Pool, Eger; Referees: Aurely Blanchard (FRA), Maria Daskalopoulou (GRE)

6 October 2024; 13:00	Report	Digi Eger (Hungary)	13–10	(Hungary) III. Keruleti TVE	Bitskey Aladár Swimming Pool, Eger; Referees: Lea Saftic (CRO), Sander Gransjean (NED)
6 October 2024; 13:00	Report	Score by quarters: 5–1, 2–3, 2–2, 4–4			Bitskey Aladár Swimming Pool, Eger; Referees: Lea Saftic (CRO), Sander Gransjean (NED)
6 October 2024; 13:00	Report	Szilágyi 3	Goals	Rajna, Toth 3	Bitskey Aladár Swimming Pool, Eger; Referees: Lea Saftic (CRO), Sander Gransjean (NED)

=== Group E ===
- 3–6 October 2024, Berlin, Germany.

Pos	Team	Pld	W	PSW	PSL	L	GF	GA	GD	Pts	Qualification	(Greece) VOU	(Netherlands) DON	(Greece) GLY	(Spain) CAT	(Germany) SPA
1	(Greece) NO Vouliagmeni	4	4	0	0	0	65	35	+30	12	Main round	—	—	15–11	17–5	—
2	(Netherlands) Widex GZC Donk	4	3	0	0	1	62	36	+26	9	Main round	12–15	—	19–11	14–4	—
3	(Greece) ANC Glyfada	4	2	0	0	2	49	55	−6	6	Euro Cup	—	—	—	—	—
4	(Spain) EPlus CN Catalunya	4	1	0	0	3	32	55	−23	3	Euro Cup	—	—	11–13	—	—
5	(Germany) Spandau 04 (H)	4	0	0	0	4	34	61	−27	0	Euro Cup	7–18	6–17	10–14	11–12	—

Source: European Aquatics
(H) Host

3 October 2024; 18:00	Report	Spandau 04 (Germany)	6–17	(Netherlands) Widex GZC Donk	Schöneberg Swimming Hall, Berlin; Referees: Nikolett Sajben (HUN), Maxim Gerasimov (GBR)
3 October 2024; 18:00	Report	Score by quarters: 1–4, 1–4, 2–6, 2–3			Schöneberg Swimming Hall, Berlin; Referees: Nikolett Sajben (HUN), Maxim Gerasimov (GBR)
3 October 2024; 18:00	Report	Deike 3	Goals	van der Sloot 4	Schöneberg Swimming Hall, Berlin; Referees: Nikolett Sajben (HUN), Maxim Gerasimov (GBR)

3 October 2024; 20:00	Report	NO Vouliagmeni (Greece)	17–5	(Spain) EPlus CN Catalunya	Schöneberg Swimming Hall, Berlin; Referees: Alessia Ferrari (ITA), Sara Kontek (CRO)
3 October 2024; 20:00	Report	Score by quarters: 4–1, 5–2, 5–1, 3–1			Schöneberg Swimming Hall, Berlin; Referees: Alessia Ferrari (ITA), Sara Kontek (CRO)
3 October 2024; 20:00	Report	Moolhuijzen 5	Goals	Vosseberg 2	Schöneberg Swimming Hall, Berlin; Referees: Alessia Ferrari (ITA), Sara Kontek (CRO)

4 October 2024; 18:00	Report	Spandau 04 (Germany)	11–12	(Spain) EPlus CN Catalunya	Schöneberg Swimming Hall, Berlin; Referees: Nikolett Sajben (HUN), Sara Kontek (CRO)
4 October 2024; 18:00	Report	Score by quarters: 2–2, 2–3, 4–4, 3–3			Schöneberg Swimming Hall, Berlin; Referees: Nikolett Sajben (HUN), Sara Kontek (CRO)
4 October 2024; 18:00	Report	Howarth 4	Goals	Diaz Velazquez 7	Schöneberg Swimming Hall, Berlin; Referees: Nikolett Sajben (HUN), Sara Kontek (CRO)

4 October 2024; 20:00	Report	NO Vouliagmeni (Greece)	15–11	(Greece) ANC Glyfada	Schöneberg Swimming Hall, Berlin; Referees: Alessia Ferrari (ITA), Maxim Gerasimov (GBR)
4 October 2024; 20:00	Report	Score by quarters: 3–2, 2–3, 3–3, 7–3			Schöneberg Swimming Hall, Berlin; Referees: Alessia Ferrari (ITA), Maxim Gerasimov (GBR)
4 October 2024; 20:00	Report	Moolhuijzen 6	Goals	Laskaridou 4	Schöneberg Swimming Hall, Berlin; Referees: Alessia Ferrari (ITA), Maxim Gerasimov (GBR)

5 October 2024; 10:00	Report	Widex GZC Donk (Netherlands)	12–15	(Greece) NO Vouliagmeni	Schöneberg Swimming Hall, Berlin; Referees: Nikolett Sajben (HUN), Alessia Ferrari (ITA)
5 October 2024; 10:00	Report	Score by quarters: 5–4, 2–4, 2–2, 3–5			Schöneberg Swimming Hall, Berlin; Referees: Nikolett Sajben (HUN), Alessia Ferrari (ITA)
5 October 2024; 10:00	Report	van der Weijden 5	Goals	Giannopoulou 5	Schöneberg Swimming Hall, Berlin; Referees: Nikolett Sajben (HUN), Alessia Ferrari (ITA)

5 October 2024; 12:00	Report	EPlus CN Catalunya (Spain)	11–13	(Greece) ANC Glyfada	Schöneberg Swimming Hall, Berlin; Referees: Sara Kontek (CRO), Maxim Gerasimov (GBR)
5 October 2024; 12:00	Report	Score by quarters: 3–4, 3–6, 2–1, 3–2			Schöneberg Swimming Hall, Berlin; Referees: Sara Kontek (CRO), Maxim Gerasimov (GBR)
5 October 2024; 12:00	Report	Diaz Velazquez 7	Goals	Turner 5	Schöneberg Swimming Hall, Berlin; Referees: Sara Kontek (CRO), Maxim Gerasimov (GBR)

5 October 2024; 18:00	Report	Spandau 04 (Germany)	7–18	(Greece) NO Vouliagmeni	Schöneberg Swimming Hall, Berlin; Referees: Nikolett Sajben (HUN), Maxim Gerasimov (GBR)
5 October 2024; 18:00	Report	Score by quarters: 1–4, 1–3, 2–7, 3–4			Schöneberg Swimming Hall, Berlin; Referees: Nikolett Sajben (HUN), Maxim Gerasimov (GBR)
5 October 2024; 18:00	Report	Deike 3	Goals	Foundotou 5	Schöneberg Swimming Hall, Berlin; Referees: Nikolett Sajben (HUN), Maxim Gerasimov (GBR)

5 October 2024; 20:00	Report	Widex GZC Donk (Netherlands)	19–11	(Greece) ANC Glyfada	Schöneberg Swimming Hall, Berlin; Referees: Sara Kontek (CRO), Alessia Ferrari (ITA)
5 October 2024; 20:00	Report	Score by quarters: 4–2, 4–2, 6–4, 5–3			Schöneberg Swimming Hall, Berlin; Referees: Sara Kontek (CRO), Alessia Ferrari (ITA)
5 October 2024; 20:00	Report	Sleeking 5	Goals	three players 2	Schöneberg Swimming Hall, Berlin; Referees: Sara Kontek (CRO), Alessia Ferrari (ITA)

6 October 2024; 10:00	Report	Spandau 04 (Germany)	10–14	(Greece) ANC Glyfada	Schöneberg Swimming Hall, Berlin; Referees: Maxim Gerasimov (GBR), Sara Kontek (CRO)
6 October 2024; 10:00	Report	Score by quarters: 1–4, 1–2, 2–3, 6–5			Schöneberg Swimming Hall, Berlin; Referees: Maxim Gerasimov (GBR), Sara Kontek (CRO)
6 October 2024; 10:00	Report	Deike 5	Goals	Moustakaria 4	Schöneberg Swimming Hall, Berlin; Referees: Maxim Gerasimov (GBR), Sara Kontek (CRO)

6 October 2024; 12:00	Report	Widex GZC Donk (Netherlands)	14–4	(Spain) EPlus CN Catalunya	Schöneberg Swimming Hall, Berlin; Referees: Alessia Ferrari (ITA), Nikolett Sajben (HUN)
6 October 2024; 12:00	Report	Score by quarters: 3–1, 1–2, 5–1, 5–0			Schöneberg Swimming Hall, Berlin; Referees: Alessia Ferrari (ITA), Nikolett Sajben (HUN)
6 October 2024; 12:00	Report	Sevenich, van der Sloot 4	Goals	four players 1	Schöneberg Swimming Hall, Berlin; Referees: Alessia Ferrari (ITA), Nikolett Sajben (HUN)

=== Ranking of third-placed teams ===
Pos	Grp	Team	Pld	W	PSW	PSL	L	GF	GA	GD	Pts	Qualification
1	B	(Hungary) Dunaújváros	4	3	0	0	1	58	37	+21	9	Main round
2	A	(Netherlands) ZV De Zaan	4	2	0	0	2	45	46	−1	6	
3	E	(Greece) ANC Glyfada	4	2	0	0	2	49	55	−6	6	
4	C	(Spain) Tenerife Echeyde	4	2	0	0	2	44	52	−8	6	
5	D	(Italy) Pallanuoto Trieste	4	1	1	0	2	51	56	−5	5	

Source: European Aquatics
Rules for classification: 1) points; 2) goal difference; 3) number of goals scored.

== See also ==
- 2024–25 European Aquatics Champions League
- 2024–25 European Aquatics Euro Cup
- 2024–25 European Aquatics Challenger Cup
- 2024 European Aquatics Super Cup
- 2024–25 European Aquatics Women's Champions League
- 2024–25 European Aquatics Women's Euro Cup
- 2024–25 European Aquatics Women's Challenger Cup
- 2024 European Aquatics Women's Super Cup
