= 2024–25 European Aquatics Women's Champions League main round =

Tournament information
- Sport: Water polo
- Dates: 26 October 2024–1 March 2025
- Teams: 16
- Website: Official website

The 2024–25 European Aquatics Women's Champions League main round is played between 26 October 2024 and 1 March 2025 to determine the eight teams advancing to the Quarterfinals of the 2024–25 European Aquatics Women's Champions League.

== Format ==
The 16 teams were place into four groups of four. In each group, teams will play against each other home-and-away in a round-robin format. The top two teams in each group advanced to the Quarterfinals.

Teams are ranked according to points (3 points for a win, 2 points for a penalty shootout win, 1 point for a penalty shootout loss, 0 points for a loss), and if tied on points, the following tiebreaking criteria are applied, in the order given, to determine the rankings:

- Points in head-to-head matches among tied teams;
- Goal difference in head-to-head matches among tied teams;
- Goals scored in head-to-head matches among tied teams;
- Goal difference in all group matches;
- Goals scored in all group matches.

== Draw ==
The draw took place on 7 October 2024 in Zagreb, Croatia. In regards to the seeding, the teams who automatically qualified for the main round were placed in pot 1, while the remaining pots were based on the results of the Qualification round. Teams in bold indicate who advanced.

Pot 1	Pot 2	Pot 3	Pot 4
(Greece) **Olympiacos Piraeus** (Hungary) UVSE Budapest (Italy) **Ekipe Orizzonte** (Spain) **Assolim CN Mataró** (Spain) **Astralpool Sabadell**	(Hungary) **FTC Telekom** (Netherlands) Polar Bears (Greece) **Alimos NAC Betsson** (Spain) CN Terrassa (Greece) **NO Vouliagmeni**	(Spain) **CN Sant Andreu** (Hungary) BVSC-Zugló (Italy) Antenore Plebiscito Padova (Italy) SIS Roma (Netherlands) Widex GZC Donk	(Hungary) Dunaújváros

== Groups ==
=== Group A ===
Pos	Team	Pld	W	PSW	PSL	L	GF	GA	GD	Pts	Qualification	(Spain) SAB	(Greece) VOU	(Hungary) DUN	(Spain) TER
1	(Spain) Astralpool Sabadell	6	6	0	0	0	76	48	+28	**18**	Quarterfinals	—	12–11	12–7	10–7
2	(Greece) NO Vouliagmeni	6	4	0	0	2	73	64	+9	**12**	Quarterfinals	11–16	—	9–8	14–8
3	(Hungary) Dunaújváros	6	1	0	1	4	55	69	−14	**4**		8–13	9–12	—	10–9
4	(Spain) CN Terrassa	6	0	1	0	5	53	76	−23	**2**		4–13	11–16	14–13 (Note: Match finished 10–10. CN Terrassa won 4–3 on penalties.)	—

Source: European Aquatics
Rules for classification: Tiebreakers

26 October 2024; 18:00	Report	CN Terrassa (Spain)	11–**16**	(Greece) **NO Vouliagmeni**	Àrea Olímpica, Terrassa; Referees: Alessia Ferrari (ITA) Marieke Van de Berg (NED)
26 October 2024; 18:00	Report	Score by quarters: 5–**6**, 1–**2**, 4–**5**, 1–**3**			Àrea Olímpica, Terrassa; Referees: Alessia Ferrari (ITA) Marieke Van de Berg (NED)
26 October 2024; 18:00	Report	Piralkova Coello 3	**Goals**	Foundotou, Xenaki 4	Àrea Olímpica, Terrassa; Referees: Alessia Ferrari (ITA) Marieke Van de Berg (NED)

26 October 2024; 18:00	Report	Dunaújváros (Hungary)	8–**13**	(Spain) **Astralpool Sabadell**	Éva Fabó Sports Swimming Pool, Dunaújváros; Referees: Giuliana Nicolosi (ITA), Philip Uhlig (GER)
26 October 2024; 18:00	Report	Score by quarters: 1–**3**, 1–**3**, 3–**5**, **3**–2			Éva Fabó Sports Swimming Pool, Dunaújváros; Referees: Giuliana Nicolosi (ITA), Philip Uhlig (GER)
26 October 2024; 18:00	Report	Dobi 3	**Goals**	Ortiz Munoz 4	Éva Fabó Sports Swimming Pool, Dunaújváros; Referees: Giuliana Nicolosi (ITA), Philip Uhlig (GER)

9 November 2024; 12:30	Report	**Astralpool Sabadell** (Spain)	**10**–7	(Spain) CN Terrassa	Can Llong pool, Sabadell; Referees: Paul-Eugen-Dorin Georgescu (ROU), Riccardo Carmignani (ITA)
9 November 2024; 12:30	Report	Score by quarters: **3**–1, **4**–1, 2–2, 1–**3**			Can Llong pool, Sabadell; Referees: Paul-Eugen-Dorin Georgescu (ROU), Riccardo Carmignani (ITA)
9 November 2024; 12:30	Report	Van de Kraats 3	**Goals**	Prats Rodriguez 5	Can Llong pool, Sabadell; Referees: Paul-Eugen-Dorin Georgescu (ROU), Riccardo Carmignani (ITA)

9 November 2024; 16:00	Report	**NO Vouliagmeni** (Greece)	**9**–8	(Hungary) Dunaújváros	"Cyprus" Swimming Pool, Vari; Referees: Alessia Ferrari (ITA), Sander Gransjean (NED)
9 November 2024; 16:00	Report	Score by quarters: 2–2, 2–2, 2–2, **3**–2			"Cyprus" Swimming Pool, Vari; Referees: Alessia Ferrari (ITA), Sander Gransjean (NED)
9 November 2024; 16:00	Report	Foundotou 3	**Goals**	Garda 4	"Cyprus" Swimming Pool, Vari; Referees: Alessia Ferrari (ITA), Sander Gransjean (NED)

23 November 2024; 14:00	Report	**CN Terrassa** (Spain)	**14**–13 (PSO)	(Hungary) Dunaújváros	Àrea Olímpica, Terrassa; Referees: Alessia Ferrari (ITA), Marieke Van de Berg (NED)
23 November 2024; 14:00	Report	Score by quarters: **4**–3, 1–1, 3–3, 2–**3** PSO: **4**–3			Àrea Olímpica, Terrassa; Referees: Alessia Ferrari (ITA), Marieke Van de Berg (NED)
23 November 2024; 14:00	Report	Ten Broek 3	**Goals**	Dobi, Garda 4	Àrea Olímpica, Terrassa; Referees: Alessia Ferrari (ITA), Marieke Van de Berg (NED)

23 November 2024; 16:00	Report	NO Vouliagmeni (Greece)	11–**16**	(Spain) **Astralpool Sabadell**	"Cyprus" Swimming Pool, Vari; Referees: Giuliana Nicolosi (ITA), Ralf Mueller (GER)
23 November 2024; 16:00	Report	Score by quarters: 5–5, 3–3, 0–**3**, 3–**5**			"Cyprus" Swimming Pool, Vari; Referees: Giuliana Nicolosi (ITA), Ralf Mueller (GER)
23 November 2024; 16:00	Report	Foundotou, Giannopoulou 3	**Goals**	Ortiz Munoz 5	"Cyprus" Swimming Pool, Vari; Referees: Giuliana Nicolosi (ITA), Ralf Mueller (GER)

25 January 2025; 15:00	Report	**NO Vouliagmeni** (Greece)	**14**–8	(Spain) CN Terrassa	Laimos Swimming Pool, Vouliagmeni; Referees: Giuliana Nicolosi (ITA), Anne Grandin (FRA)
25 January 2025; 15:00	Report	Score by quarters: **5**–3, **3**–1, **4**–1, 2–**3**			Laimos Swimming Pool, Vouliagmeni; Referees: Giuliana Nicolosi (ITA), Anne Grandin (FRA)
25 January 2025; 15:00	Report	Moolhuijzen, Xenaki 4	**Goals**	three players 2	Laimos Swimming Pool, Vouliagmeni; Referees: Giuliana Nicolosi (ITA), Anne Grandin (FRA)

25 January 2025; 12:30	Report	**Astralpool Sabadell** (Spain)	**12**–7	(Hungary) Dunaújváros	Can Llong pool, Sabadell; Referees: Martina Kunikova (SVK), Lea Saftic (CRO)
25 January 2025; 12:30	Report	Score by quarters: **2**–1, **3**–1, 2–**3**, **5**–2			Can Llong pool, Sabadell; Referees: Martina Kunikova (SVK), Lea Saftic (CRO)
25 January 2025; 12:30	Report	Keszthelyi, Ortiz Munoz 4	**Goals**	Katsimpri 4	Can Llong pool, Sabadell; Referees: Martina Kunikova (SVK), Lea Saftic (CRO)

15 February 2025; 18:00	Report	CN Terrassa (Spain)	4–**13**	**(Spain) Astralpool Sabadell**	Àrea Olímpica, Terrassa; Referees: Alessia Ferrari (ITA), Luis Alves (POR)
15 February 2025; 18:00	Report	Score by quarters: 1–**4**, 1–**2**, 1–**4**, 1–**3**			Àrea Olímpica, Terrassa; Referees: Alessia Ferrari (ITA), Luis Alves (POR)
15 February 2025; 18:00	Report	four players 1	**Goals**	Van de Kraats 4	Àrea Olímpica, Terrassa; Referees: Alessia Ferrari (ITA), Luis Alves (POR)

15 February 2025; 12:30	Report	Dunaújváros (Hungary)	9–**12**	(Greece) **NO Vouliagmeni**	Éva Fabó Sports Swimming Pool, Dunaújváros; Referees: Marieke Van Der Berg (NED), Arnaldo Petronilli (ITA)
15 February 2025; 12:30	Report	Score by quarters: 1–**3**, **4**–1, 2–**5**, 2–**3**			Éva Fabó Sports Swimming Pool, Dunaújváros; Referees: Marieke Van Der Berg (NED), Arnaldo Petronilli (ITA)
15 February 2025; 12:30	Report	Dobi, Garda 2	**Goals**	Moolhuijzen 4	Éva Fabó Sports Swimming Pool, Dunaújváros; Referees: Marieke Van Der Berg (NED), Arnaldo Petronilli (ITA)

1 March 2025; 12:30	Report	Dunaújváros (Hungary)	**10**–9	(Spain) CN Terrassa	Éva Fabó Sports Swimming Pool, Dunaújváros; Referees: Giuliana Nicolosi (ITA), Sara Kontek (CRO)
1 March 2025; 12:30	Report	Score by quarters: **3**–1, **3**–1, 1–**3**, 3–**4**			Éva Fabó Sports Swimming Pool, Dunaújváros; Referees: Giuliana Nicolosi (ITA), Sara Kontek (CRO)
1 March 2025; 12:30	Report	Dobi, Garda 2	**Goals**	Piralkova 3	Éva Fabó Sports Swimming Pool, Dunaújváros; Referees: Giuliana Nicolosi (ITA), Sara Kontek (CRO)

1 March 2025; 18:00	Report	Astralpool Sabadell (Spain)	**12**–11	(Greece) NO Vouliagmeni	Can Llong pool, Sabadell
1 March 2025; 18:00	Report	Score by quarters: 2–**3**, **2**–1, **6**–4, 2–**3**			Can Llong pool, Sabadell
1 March 2025; 18:00	Report	Keszthelyi 3	**Goals**	Moolhuijzen 4	Can Llong pool, Sabadell

=== Group B ===
Pos	Team	Pld	W	PSW	PSL	L	GF	GA	GD	Pts	Qualification	(Hungary) FTC	(Spain) MAT	(Netherlands) POL	(Italy) PAD (Note: On 1 November 2024, Antenore Plebiscito Padova were disqualified due to breaching the financial requirements of the competition. However, on 5 November, Antenore Plebiscito Padova were reinstated into the competition after positive actions were made by the club.)
1	(Hungary) FTC Telekom	6	5	0	1	0	85	67	+18	**16**	Quarterfinals	—	13–14 (Note: Match finished 10–10. CN Mataró won 4–3 on penalties.)	19–11	9–6
2	(Spain) Assolim CN Mataró	6	4	1	0	1	89	66	+23	**14**	Quarterfinals	11–13	—	13–5	16–9
3	(Netherlands) Polar Bears	6	1	0	0	5	74	94	−20	**3 (Note: Polar Bears 27–26 Antenore Plebiscito Padova)**		14–17	17–19	—	14–11
4	(Italy) Antenore Plebiscito Padova (Note: On 1 November 2024, Antenore Plebiscito Padova were disqualified due to breaching the financial requirements of the competition. However, on 5 November, Antenore Plebiscito Padova were reinstated into the competition after positive actions were made by the club.)	6	1	0	0	5	61	82	−21	**3**		11–14	9–16	15–13	—

Source: European Aquatics
Rules for classification: Tiebreakers
Notes:

26 October 2024; 18:00	Report	**FTC Telekom** (Hungary)	**9**–6	(Italy) Antenore Plebiscito Padova	FTC Swimming Pool, Budapest; Referees: Anne Grandin (FRA), Igor Virijevic (SRB)
26 October 2024; 18:00	Report	Score by quarters: **2**–1, 1–**2**, **5**–2, 1–1			FTC Swimming Pool, Budapest; Referees: Anne Grandin (FRA), Igor Virijevic (SRB)
26 October 2024; 18:00	Report	Gurisatti 3	**Goals**	Meggiato, Schaap 2	FTC Swimming Pool, Budapest; Referees: Anne Grandin (FRA), Igor Virijevic (SRB)

27 October 2024; 13:00	Report	Polar Bears (Netherlands)	17–**19**	(Spain) **Assolim CN Mataró**	Zwembad De Peppel, Ede; Referees: Aurely Blanchard (FRA), Martina Kunikova (SVK)
27 October 2024; 13:00	Report	Score by quarters: **5**–3, 4–**6**, **5**–4, 3–**6**			Zwembad De Peppel, Ede; Referees: Aurely Blanchard (FRA), Martina Kunikova (SVK)
27 October 2024; 13:00	Report	Willemsen 4	**Goals**	four players 3	Zwembad De Peppel, Ede; Referees: Aurely Blanchard (FRA), Martina Kunikova (SVK)

9 November 2024; 13:00	Report	Assolim CN Mataró (Spain)	11–**13**	(Hungary) **FTC Telekom**	Municipal Sports Complex, Mataró; Referees: Natalia Markopoulou (GRE), Jakov Blaskovic (CRO)
9 November 2024; 13:00	Report	Score by quarters: **3**–2, 4–**6**, 2–2, 2–**3**			Municipal Sports Complex, Mataró; Referees: Natalia Markopoulou (GRE), Jakov Blaskovic (CRO)

9 November 2024; 18:30	Report	**Antenore Plebiscito Padova** (Italy)	**15**–13	(Netherlands) Polar Bears	Centro Sportivo Plebiscito, Padua; Referees: Maria Daskalopoulou (GRE), Peter Radic (SVK)
9 November 2024; 18:30	Report	Score by quarters: 0–**3**, **7**–4, **5**–3, 3–3			Centro Sportivo Plebiscito, Padua; Referees: Maria Daskalopoulou (GRE), Peter Radic (SVK)
9 November 2024; 18:30	Report	Meggiato, Muissu 3	**Goals**	Bosveld 5	Centro Sportivo Plebiscito, Padua; Referees: Maria Daskalopoulou (GRE), Peter Radic (SVK)

23 November 2024; 13:00	Report	**Assolim CN Mataró** (Spain)	**16**–9	(Italy) Antenore Plebiscito Padova	Municipal Sports Complex, Mataró; Referees: Aurely Blanchard (FRA), Lea Saftic (CRO)
23 November 2024; 13:00	Report	Score by quarters: **5**–2, **3**–2, **5**–1, 3–**4**			Municipal Sports Complex, Mataró; Referees: Aurely Blanchard (FRA), Lea Saftic (CRO)
23 November 2024; 13:00	Report	three players 3	**Goals**	Cassara 3	Municipal Sports Complex, Mataró; Referees: Aurely Blanchard (FRA), Lea Saftic (CRO)

23 November 2024; 19:30	Report	Polar Bears (Netherlands)	14–**17**	(Hungary) **FTC Telekom**	Zwembad De Peppel, Ede; Referees: Anne Grandin (FRA), Martina Kunikova (SVK)
23 November 2024; 19:30	Report	Score by quarters: 4–4, 5–5, 3–**4**, 2–**4**			Zwembad De Peppel, Ede; Referees: Anne Grandin (FRA), Martina Kunikova (SVK)
23 November 2024; 19:30	Report	Bosveld 4	**Goals**	Mate 4	Zwembad De Peppel, Ede; Referees: Anne Grandin (FRA), Martina Kunikova (SVK)

25 January 2025; 13:00	Report	**Assolim CN Mataró** (Spain)	13–5	(Netherlands) Polar Bears	Municipal Sports Complex, Mataró; Referees: Natalia Markopoulou (GRE), Peter Radic (SVK)
25 January 2025; 13:00	Report	Score by quarters: **5**–1, **3**–2, **2**–1, **3**–1			Municipal Sports Complex, Mataró; Referees: Natalia Markopoulou (GRE), Peter Radic (SVK)
25 January 2025; 13:00	Report	Claveria Murillo 5	**Goals**	Van Der Elst 2	Municipal Sports Complex, Mataró; Referees: Natalia Markopoulou (GRE), Peter Radic (SVK)

25 January 2025; 19:00	Report	Antenore Plebiscito Padova (Italy)	11–**14**	(Hungary) **FTC Telekom**	Centro Sportivo Plebiscito, Padua; Referees: Maria Daskalopoulou (GRE), Mihnea Ioan Alexandrescu (ROU)
25 January 2025; 19:00	Report	Score by quarters: 1–**2**, 4–**6**, 2–2, 4–4			Centro Sportivo Plebiscito, Padua; Referees: Maria Daskalopoulou (GRE), Mihnea Ioan Alexandrescu (ROU)
25 January 2025; 19:00	Report	Schaap 5	**Goals**	Plevritou 4	Centro Sportivo Plebiscito, Padua; Referees: Maria Daskalopoulou (GRE), Mihnea Ioan Alexandrescu (ROU)

15 February 2025; 19:30	Report	**Polar Bears** (Netherlands)	**14**–11	(Italy) Antenore Plebiscito Padova	Zwembad De Peppel, Ede; Referees: Ilkin Cakmakoglu (TUR), Gernot Haentschel (GER)
15 February 2025; 19:30	Report	Score by quarters: 3–3, **4**–2, **4**–3, 3–3			Zwembad De Peppel, Ede; Referees: Ilkin Cakmakoglu (TUR), Gernot Haentschel (GER)
15 February 2025; 19:30	Report	Bosveld 5	**Goals**	Cassara 3	Zwembad De Peppel, Ede; Referees: Ilkin Cakmakoglu (TUR), Gernot Haentschel (GER)

15 February 2025; 19:30	Report	FTC Telekom (Hungary)	13–**14** (PSO)	(Spain) **Assolim CN Mataró**	FTC Swimming Pool, Budapest; Referees: Aurely Blanchard (FRA), Maxim Gerasimov (GBR)
15 February 2025; 19:30	Report	Score by quarters: 4–4, 1–**2**, 1–**2**, **4**–2 PSO: 3–**4**			FTC Swimming Pool, Budapest; Referees: Aurely Blanchard (FRA), Maxim Gerasimov (GBR)
15 February 2025; 19:30	Report	Valyi 4	**Goals**	Claveria Murillo 3	FTC Swimming Pool, Budapest; Referees: Aurely Blanchard (FRA), Maxim Gerasimov (GBR)

1 March 2025; 20:30	Report	FTC Telekom (Hungary)	9–**16**	(Netherlands) Polar Bears	FTC Swimming Pool, Budapest; Referees: Robert Prelovsky (SVK), Lazar Andjelic (SRB)
1 March 2025; 20:30	Report	Score by quarters: 1–**3**, **2**–1, 5–5, 1–**7**			FTC Swimming Pool, Budapest; Referees: Robert Prelovsky (SVK), Lazar Andjelic (SRB)
1 March 2025; 20:30	Report	Perkins 3	**Goals**	Murillo 5	FTC Swimming Pool, Budapest; Referees: Robert Prelovsky (SVK), Lazar Andjelic (SRB)

1 March 2025; 14:00	Report	Antenore Plebiscito Padova (Italy)	**19**–11	(Spain) Assolim CN Mataró	Centro Sportivo Plebiscito, Padua; Referees: Tomi Kavcic (SLO), SANTOS Luis Santos (POR)
1 March 2025; 14:00	Report	Score by quarters: 2–2, **6**–3, **8**–4, **3**–2			Centro Sportivo Plebiscito, Padua; Referees: Tomi Kavcic (SLO), SANTOS Luis Santos (POR)
1 March 2025; 14:00	Report	Leimeter 5	**Goals**	Schinkel 3	Centro Sportivo Plebiscito, Padua; Referees: Tomi Kavcic (SLO), SANTOS Luis Santos (POR)

=== Group C ===
Pos	Team	Pld	W	PSW	PSL	L	GF	GA	GD	Pts	Qualification	(Greece) OLY	(Greece) ALI	(Netherlands) DON	(Italy) ROM
1	(Greece) Olympiacos Piraeus	6	6	0	0	0	84	62	+22	**18**	Quarterfinals	—	14–11	17–13	10–3
2	(Greece) Alimos NAS Betsson	6	1	2	0	3	70	72	−2	**7**	Quarterfinals	11–12	—	13–11 (Note: Match finished 8–8. Alimos NAS Betsson won 5–3 on penalties.)	15–14 (Note: Match finished 11–11. Alimos NAS Betsson won 4–3 on penalties.)
3	(Netherlands) Widex GZC Donk	6	1	1	1	3	79	88	−9	**6**		13–17	10–11	—	20–19 (Note: Match finished 14–14. Widex GZC Donk won 6–5 on penalties.)
4	(Italy) SIS Roma	6	1	0	2	3	69	80	−11	**5**		11–14	11–9	11–12	—

Source: European Aquatics
Rules for classification: Tiebreakers

26 October 2024; 14:00	Report	**Widex GZC Donk** (Netherlands)	**20**–19 (PSO)	(Italy) SIS Roma	Groenhovenbad, Gouda; Referees: Alex Marquez (ESP), Sara Kontek (CRO)
26 October 2024; 14:00	Report	Score by quarters: **4**–2, 4–4, 2–**3**, 4–**5** PSO: **6**–5			Groenhovenbad, Gouda; Referees: Alex Marquez (ESP), Sara Kontek (CRO)
26 October 2024; 14:00	Report	van der Sloot 5	**Goals**	Chiappini 4	Groenhovenbad, Gouda; Referees: Alex Marquez (ESP), Sara Kontek (CRO)

26 October 2024; 18:00	Report	Alimos NAS Betsson (Greece)	11–**12**	(Greece) **Olympiacos Piraeus**	Papastrateio "Petros Kapagerof" Pool, Piraeus; Referees: Nora Debreceni (HUN), Juan Carlos Colominas (ESP)
26 October 2024; 18:00	Report	Score by quarters: 2–2, **5**–4, 1–**2**, 3–**4**			Papastrateio "Petros Kapagerof" Pool, Piraeus; Referees: Nora Debreceni (HUN), Juan Carlos Colominas (ESP)
26 October 2024; 18:00	Report	Asimaki 3	**Goals**	Santa 5	Papastrateio "Petros Kapagerof" Pool, Piraeus; Referees: Nora Debreceni (HUN), Juan Carlos Colominas (ESP)

9 November 2024; 17:30	Report	**Olympiacos Piraeus** (Greece)	**17**–13	(Netherlands) Widex GZC Donk	Papastrateio "Petros Kapagerof" Pool, Piraeus; Referees: Norbert Ercse (HUN), Maxim Gerasimov (GBR)
9 November 2024; 17:30	Report	Score by quarters: **5**–1, 3–**4**, **5**–4, 4–4			Papastrateio "Petros Kapagerof" Pool, Piraeus; Referees: Norbert Ercse (HUN), Maxim Gerasimov (GBR)
9 November 2024; 17:30	Report	Ninou 6	**Goals**	three players 3	Papastrateio "Petros Kapagerof" Pool, Piraeus; Referees: Norbert Ercse (HUN), Maxim Gerasimov (GBR)

9 November 2024; 19:30	Report	**SIS Roma** (Italy)	**11**–9	(Greece) Alimos NAS Betsson	Frecciarossa Water Polo, Rome; Referees: Marta Cabanas (ESP), Eurico Silva (POR)
9 November 2024; 19:30	Report	Score by quarters: 1–1, **3**–2, **6**–4, 1–**2**			Frecciarossa Water Polo, Rome; Referees: Marta Cabanas (ESP), Eurico Silva (POR)
9 November 2024; 19:30	Report	Centanni 4	**Goals**	Elliniadi, Marletta 3	Frecciarossa Water Polo, Rome; Referees: Marta Cabanas (ESP), Eurico Silva (POR)

23 November 2024; 17:30	Report	**Olympiacos Piraeus** (Greece)	**10**–3	(Italy) SIS Roma	Papastrateio "Petros Kapagerof" Pool, Piraeus; Referees: Nora Debreceni (HUN), Juan Carlos Colominas (ESP)
23 November 2024; 17:30	Report	Score by quarters: **2**–1, 1–1, **4**–0, **3**–1			Papastrateio "Petros Kapagerof" Pool, Piraeus; Referees: Nora Debreceni (HUN), Juan Carlos Colominas (ESP)
23 November 2024; 17:30	Report	three players 2	**Goals**	three players 1	Papastrateio "Petros Kapagerof" Pool, Piraeus; Referees: Nora Debreceni (HUN), Juan Carlos Colominas (ESP)

23 November 2024; 20:00	Report	**Alimos NAS Betsson** (Greece)	**13**–11 (PSO)	(Netherlands) Widex GZC Donk	Papastrateio "Petros Kapagerof" Pool, Piraeus; Referees: Marta Cabanas (ESP), Ivanka Rakovic Krstonosic (SRB)
23 November 2024; 20:00	Report	Score by quarters: **2**–1, 2–**3**, 1–1, 3–3 PSO: **5**–3			Papastrateio "Petros Kapagerof" Pool, Piraeus; Referees: Marta Cabanas (ESP), Ivanka Rakovic Krstonosic (SRB)
23 November 2024; 20:00	Report	Elliniadi, Marletta 3	**Goals**	van der Sloot 3	Papastrateio "Petros Kapagerof" Pool, Piraeus; Referees: Marta Cabanas (ESP), Ivanka Rakovic Krstonosic (SRB)

25 January 2025; 19:00	Report	**Olympiacos Piraeus** (Greece)	**14**–11	(Greece) Alimos NAS Betsson	Papastrateio "Petros Kapagerof" Pool, Piraeus; Referees: Nikolett Sajben (HUN), Alex Marquez (ESP)
25 January 2025; 19:00	Report	Score by quarters: **4**–1, 3–**4**, **3**–2, 4–4			Papastrateio "Petros Kapagerof" Pool, Piraeus; Referees: Nikolett Sajben (HUN), Alex Marquez (ESP)
25 January 2025; 19:00	Report	Ninou 4	**Goals**	four players 2	Papastrateio "Petros Kapagerof" Pool, Piraeus; Referees: Nikolett Sajben (HUN), Alex Marquez (ESP)

25 January 2025; 21:00	Report	SIS Roma (Italy)	11–**12**	(Netherlands) **Widex GZC Donk**	Frecciarossa Water Polo, Rome; Referees: Igor Virijevic (SRB), Nora Debreceni (HUN)
25 January 2025; 21:00	Report	Score by quarters: **3**–2, **3**–1, 2–**4**, 3–**5**			Frecciarossa Water Polo, Rome; Referees: Igor Virijevic (SRB), Nora Debreceni (HUN)
25 January 2025; 21:00	Report	Centanni, Ranalli 3	**Goals**	four players 3	Frecciarossa Water Polo, Rome; Referees: Igor Virijevic (SRB), Nora Debreceni (HUN)

15 February 2025; 18:00	Report	**Alimos NAS Betsson** (Greece)	**15**–14 (PSO)	(Italy) SIS Roma	Papastrateio "Petros Kapagerof" Pool, Piraeus; Referees: Lea Saftic (CRO), Juan Carlos Colominas (ESP)
15 February 2025; 18:00	Report	Score by quarters: 2–2, 4–**5**, 2–**3**, **3**–1 PSO: **4**–3			Papastrateio "Petros Kapagerof" Pool, Piraeus; Referees: Lea Saftic (CRO), Juan Carlos Colominas (ESP)
15 February 2025; 18:00	Report	three players 2	**Goals**	Ranalli 7	Papastrateio "Petros Kapagerof" Pool, Piraeus; Referees: Lea Saftic (CRO), Juan Carlos Colominas (ESP)

15 February 2025; 16:00	Report	Widex GZC Donk (Netherlands)	13–**17**	(Greece) **Olympiacos Piraeus**	Groenhovenbad, Gouda; Referees: Julien Bourges (FRA), Nora Debreceni (HUN)
15 February 2025; 16:00	Report	Score by quarters: 3–**6**, 2–**5**, **5**–4, **3**–2			Groenhovenbad, Gouda; Referees: Julien Bourges (FRA), Nora Debreceni (HUN)
15 February 2025; 16:00	Report	Van der Weijden, Van der Sloot 4	**Goals**	three players 3	Groenhovenbad, Gouda; Referees: Julien Bourges (FRA), Nora Debreceni (HUN)

1 March 2025; 14:00	Report	Widex GZC Donk (Netherlands)	10–**11**	(Greece) Alimos NAS Betsson	Groenhovenbad, Gouda; Referees: Martina Kunikova (SVK), Rajmund Fodor (HUN)
1 March 2025; 14:00	Report	Score by quarters: 2–2, 3–**4**, **3**–2, 2–**3**			Groenhovenbad, Gouda; Referees: Martina Kunikova (SVK), Rajmund Fodor (HUN)
1 March 2025; 14:00	Report	Sleeking 3	**Goals**	Elliniadi 4	Groenhovenbad, Gouda; Referees: Martina Kunikova (SVK), Rajmund Fodor (HUN)

1 March 2025; 18:00	Report	SIS Roma (Italy)	11–**14**	(Greece) Olympiacos Piraeus	Frecciarossa Water Polo, Rome; Referees: Marta Cabanas (ESP), Aurely Blanchard (FRA)
1 March 2025; 18:00	Report	Score by quarters: **3**–2, 2–**3**, **5**–4, 1–**5**			Frecciarossa Water Polo, Rome; Referees: Marta Cabanas (ESP), Aurely Blanchard (FRA)
1 March 2025; 18:00	Report	Cocchiere, Ranalli 3	**Goals**	Andrews 4	Frecciarossa Water Polo, Rome; Referees: Marta Cabanas (ESP), Aurely Blanchard (FRA)

=== Group D ===
Pos	Team	Pld	W	PSW	PSL	L	GF	GA	GD	Pts	Qualification	(Spain) SAN	(Italy) ORI	(Hungary) UVSE	(Hungary) ZUG
1	(Spain) CN Sant Andreu	6	6	0	0	0	90	54	+36	**18**	Quarterfinals	—	16–10	14–11	18–5
2	(Italy) Ekipe Orizzonte	6	4	0	0	2	70	61	+9	**12**	Quarterfinals	8–12	—	12–10	15–4
3	(Hungary) UVSE Budapest	6	2	0	0	4	68	68	0	**6**		10–13	7–9	—	13–10
4	(Hungary) BVSC-Zugló	6	0	0	0	6	51	96	−45	**0**		10–17	12–16	10–17	—

Source: European Aquatics
Rules for classification: Tiebreakers

26 October 2024; 15:00	Report	**Ekipe Orizzonte** (Italy)	**12**–10	(Hungary) UVSE Budapest	Piscina di Nesima, Catania; Referees: Natalia Markopoulou (GRE), Ruben Sap (NED)
26 October 2024; 15:00	Report	Score by quarters: 3–**4**, 2–**3**, **4**–2, **3**–1			Piscina di Nesima, Catania; Referees: Natalia Markopoulou (GRE), Ruben Sap (NED)
26 October 2024; 15:00	Report	Halligan 5	**Goals**	Faragó 3	Piscina di Nesima, Catania; Referees: Natalia Markopoulou (GRE), Ruben Sap (NED)

26 October 2024; 17:00	Report	**CN Sant Andreu** (Spain)	**18**–5	(Hungary) BVSC-Zugló	Nova Escullera Sport Center, Barcelona; Referees: Maria Daskalopoulou (GRE), Lea Saftic (CRO)
26 October 2024; 17:00	Report	Score by quarters: **6**–2, **3**–0, 3–3, **6**–0			Nova Escullera Sport Center, Barcelona; Referees: Maria Daskalopoulou (GRE), Lea Saftic (CRO)
26 October 2024; 17:00	Report	A. Barril 4	**Goals**	Ármai 2	Nova Escullera Sport Center, Barcelona; Referees: Maria Daskalopoulou (GRE), Lea Saftic (CRO)

9 November 2024; 18:00	Report	UVSE Budapest (Hungary)	10–**13**	(Spain) **CN Sant Andreu**	Alfréd Hajós National Swimming Stadium, Budapest; Referees: Aurely Blanchard (FRA), Philip Uhlig (GER)
9 November 2024; 18:00	Report	Score by quarters: **5**–4, **5**–4, 0–**3**, 0–**2**			Alfréd Hajós National Swimming Stadium, Budapest; Referees: Aurely Blanchard (FRA), Philip Uhlig (GER)
9 November 2024; 18:00	Report	Hajdu 4	**Goals**	A. Barril, E. Barril 3	Alfréd Hajós National Swimming Stadium, Budapest; Referees: Aurely Blanchard (FRA), Philip Uhlig (GER)

9 November 2024; 19:00	Report	BVSC-Zugló (Hungary)	12–**16**	(Italy) **Ekipe Orizzonte**	Budapest, Hungary; Referees: Marieke Van de Berg (NED), Bogdan Beljin (SRB)
9 November 2024; 19:00	Report	Score by quarters: 2–**5**, 3–3, 3–**6**, **4**–2			Budapest, Hungary; Referees: Marieke Van de Berg (NED), Bogdan Beljin (SRB)
9 November 2024; 19:00	Report	Ármai 6	**Goals**	Halligan 6	Budapest, Hungary; Referees: Marieke Van de Berg (NED), Bogdan Beljin (SRB)

23 November 2024; 17:00	Report	**CN Sant Andreu** (Spain)	**16**–10	(Italy) Ekipe Orizzonte	Barcelona, Spain; Referees: Maria Daskalopoulou (GRE), Alexandru-Andrei Mustata (ROU)
23 November 2024; 17:00	Report	Score by quarters: **4**–2, **4**–2, **6**–2, 2–**4**			Barcelona, Spain; Referees: Maria Daskalopoulou (GRE), Alexandru-Andrei Mustata (ROU)
23 November 2024; 17:00	Report	A. Barril 5	**Goals**	Andrews 3	Barcelona, Spain; Referees: Maria Daskalopoulou (GRE), Alexandru-Andrei Mustata (ROU)

23 November 2024; 18:30	Report	BVSC-Zugló (Hungary)	10–**17**	(Hungary) **UVSE Budapest**	Budapest, Hungary; Referees: Natalia Markopoulou (GRE), Sander Gransjean (NED)
23 November 2024; 18:30	Report	Score by quarters: 2–2, 4–4, 2–**4**, 2–**7**			Budapest, Hungary; Referees: Natalia Markopoulou (GRE), Sander Gransjean (NED)
23 November 2024; 18:30	Report	Pocze 3	**Goals**	Faragó 6	Budapest, Hungary; Referees: Natalia Markopoulou (GRE), Sander Gransjean (NED)

25 January 2025; 17:00	Report	BVSC-Zugló (Hungary)	10–**17**	(Spain) **CN Sant Andreu**	Budapest, Hungary; Referees: Marieke Van Den Berg (NED), Eurico Silva (POR)
25 January 2025; 17:00	Report	Score by quarters: 2–**4**, 3–**5**, 1–**5**, **4**–3			Budapest, Hungary; Referees: Marieke Van Den Berg (NED), Eurico Silva (POR)
25 January 2025; 17:00	Report	two players 2	**Goals**	Ruiz Barril 5	Budapest, Hungary; Referees: Marieke Van Den Berg (NED), Eurico Silva (POR)

25 January 2025; 18:00	Report	UVSE Budapest (Hungary)	7–**9**	(Italy) **Ekipe Orizzonte**	Alfréd Hajós National Swimming Stadium, Budapest; Referees: Peter De Jong (NED), Tomislav Copic (CRO)
25 January 2025; 18:00	Report	Score by quarters: 1–**2**, 1–**2**, **3**–1, 2–**4**			Alfréd Hajós National Swimming Stadium, Budapest; Referees: Peter De Jong (NED), Tomislav Copic (CRO)
25 January 2025; 18:00	Report	Farago, Hajdu 2	**Goals**	Andrews 3	Alfréd Hajós National Swimming Stadium, Budapest; Referees: Peter De Jong (NED), Tomislav Copic (CRO)

15 February 2025; 17:00	Report	**CN Sant Andreu** (Spain)	**14**–11	(Hungary) UVSE Budapest	Barcelona, Spain; Referees: Maria Daskalopoulou (GRE), Ruben Sap (NED)
15 February 2025; 17:00	Report	Score by quarters: **4**–2, **3**–1, 3–**5**, **4**–3			Barcelona, Spain; Referees: Maria Daskalopoulou (GRE), Ruben Sap (NED)
15 February 2025; 17:00	Report	A. Barril 5	**Goals**	Farago, Szegedi 2	Barcelona, Spain; Referees: Maria Daskalopoulou (GRE), Ruben Sap (NED)

15 February 2025; 15:00	Report	**Ekipe Orizzonte** (Italy)	**15**–4	(Hungary) BVSC-Zugló	Piscina di Nesima, Catania; Referees: Natalia Markopoulou (GRE), Massimo Angileri (MLT)
15 February 2025; 15:00	Report	Score by quarters: **2**–0, 3–3, **4**–0, **6**–1			Piscina di Nesima, Catania; Referees: Natalia Markopoulou (GRE), Massimo Angileri (MLT)
15 February 2025; 15:00	Report	Bettini 4	**Goals**	four players 1	Piscina di Nesima, Catania; Referees: Natalia Markopoulou (GRE), Massimo Angileri (MLT)

1 March 2025; 16:00	Report	UVSE Budapest (Hungary)	**13**–10	(Hungary) BVSC-Zugló	Alfréd Hajós National Swimming Stadium, Budapest; Referees: Alexandru-Andrei Mustata (ROU), Bogdan Beljin
1 March 2025; 16:00	Report	Score by quarters: **1**–0, **3**–2, **5**–2, 4–**6**			Alfréd Hajós National Swimming Stadium, Budapest; Referees: Alexandru-Andrei Mustata (ROU), Bogdan Beljin
1 March 2025; 16:00	Report	Faragó 4	**Goals**	Petik 4	Alfréd Hajós National Swimming Stadium, Budapest; Referees: Alexandru-Andrei Mustata (ROU), Bogdan Beljin

1 March 2025; 17:30	Report	Ekipe Orizzonte (Italy)	8–**12**	(Spain) CN Sant Andreu	Piscina di Nesima, Catania; Referees: Marieke Van Der Berg (NED), Maxim Gerasimov (GBR)
1 March 2025; 17:30	Report	Score by quarters: 1–**3**, 2–**3**, 1–**2**, 4–4			Piscina di Nesima, Catania; Referees: Marieke Van Der Berg (NED), Maxim Gerasimov (GBR)
1 March 2025; 17:30	Report	Andrews, Bettini 2	**Goals**	Crespi Barriga, Ruiz Barril 3	Piscina di Nesima, Catania; Referees: Marieke Van Der Berg (NED), Maxim Gerasimov (GBR)

== See also ==
- 2024–25 European Aquatics Champions League
- 2024–25 European Aquatics Euro Cup
- 2024–25 European Aquatics Challenger Cup
- 2024 European Aquatics Super Cup
- 2024–25 European Aquatics Women's Champions League
- 2024–25 European Aquatics Women's Euro Cup
- 2024–25 European Aquatics Women's Challenger Cup
- 2024 European Aquatics Women's Super Cup
