= 2024–25 European Aquatics Women's Champions League =

Water polo sports season

European Aquatics Women's Champions League
- 2024–25

Tournament information
- Sport: Water polo
- Dates: Qualification round: 3–6 October 2024; Main Round: 26 October 2024 – 1 March 2025; Quarterfinals: 22–29 March 2025; Final Four: 2–3 May 2025
- Teams: Competition proper: 16; Total: 30 (from 8 countries)
- Website: Official website

Final positions
- Champions: (Spain) CN Sant Andreu (1st title)
- Runner-up: (Spain) Astralpool Sabadell

Tournament statistics
- Matches played: 110
- Goals scored: 2,676 (24.33 per match)

The 2024–25 European Aquatics Women's Champions League is the 37th edition of the water polo competition organised by European Aquatics for premier club women's water polo teams. The defending champions are Astralpool Sabadell.

The winners were CN Sant Andreu, who won their first title by triumphing over two-time defending champions Astralpool Sabadell in the final.

== Format ==
After one qualification round, sixteen teams will qualify for the main round. The groups in the main round are held in a home and away format. After the main round, the four groups winners and runners-up will qualify for the quarterfinals. In the quarterfinals, eight teams play in four play offs in a home and away format to advance to the Final Four and compete in the Final Four to decide the winners of the European Aquatics Women's Champions League.

== Rankings ==
Countries inside the top 6 of the European Aquatics women's club rankings are eligible to enter 6 clubs into the Champions League, up from 5 which was the limit last season. While countries outside the top 6 can enter their league champion into either the Champions League or Challenger Cup.

Rank	Association	Points	Teams
1	Spain	124,200	6
2	Greece	105,102.5	6
3	Hungary	89,452.5	6
4	Italy	76,760	5
5	France	35,147.5	2
6	Netherlands	13,785	3
7	Russia	9,217.5	0
8	Germany	8,290	1
9	Portugal	6,010	0
10	Malta	4,090	0

Rank	Association	Points	Teams
11	Croatia	2,930	0
12	Serbia	2,860	0
13	Turkey	2,560	0
14	Slovakia	1,715	0
15	(United Kingdom) Great Britain	1,330	0
16	Israel	1,250	1
17	Sweden	1,060	0
18	Bulgaria	770	0
19	Czech Republic	770	0

== Teams ==
European Aquatics increased the number of clubs a country can enter, from 5 to 6. German representative, Spandau 04 and Israeli team, Hapoel Yoneam were the only clubs outside the top 6 who decided to enter, starting in the qualifiers. All other clubs and countries below the top six entered the 2024–25 LEN Women's Challenger Cup. Tenerife Echeyde took the place of CE Mediterrani who didn't enter.

Main round
(Greece) Olympiacos Piraeus (1st)	(Hungary) UVSE Budapest (1st)	(Italy) Ekipe Orizzonte (1st)	(Spain) CN Mataró (1st)
(Spain) Astralpool Sabadell ^{CL} (3rd)			

Qualification round
(France) Lille UC (1st)	(France) Grand Nancy AC (3rd)	(Germany) Spandau 04 (1st)	(Greece) NO Vouliagmeni (2hd)
(Greece) Alimos NAC Betsson (3rd)	(Greece) Ethnikos Piraeus (4th)	(Greece) ANC Glyfada (5th)	(Greece) Panionios GSS (6th)
(Hungary) FTC Telekom (2nd)	(Hungary) Digi Eger (3rd)	(Hungary) Dunaújváros (4th)	(Hungary) BVSC-Zugló (5th)
(Hungary) III. Keruleti TVE (6th)	(Israel) Hapoel Yoneam (1st)	(Italy) Antenore Plebiscito Padova (2nd)	(Italy) SIS Roma (3rd)
(Italy) Rapallo Pallanuoto (4th)	(Italy) Pallanuoto Trieste (5th)	(Netherlands) ZV De Zaan (1st)	(Netherlands) Widex GZC Donk (2nd)
(Netherlands) Polar Bears (3rd)	(Spain) CN Sant Andreu (2nd)	(Spain) CN Terrassa (4rd)	(Spain) EPlus CN Catalunya (6th)
(Spain) Tenerife Echeyde (7th)			

== Round and draw dates ==
=== Schedule ===
Phase	Round	Round date
Qualification round		3–6 October 2024
Main round	Matchday 1	26 October 2024
Main round	Matchday 2	9 November 2024
Main round	Matchday 3	23 November 2024
Main round	Matchday 4	25 January 2025
Main round	Matchday 5	15 February 2025
Main round	Matchday 6	1 March 2025
Quarterfinals	First leg	22 March 2025
Quarterfinals	Second leg	29 March 2025
Final Four	Semifinals	2 May 2025
Final Four	Final	3 May 2025

== Qualification round ==
In the qualification round, teams play in a round robin format. The top 2 in every group makes the main round alongside the best third place team. The teams who don't advance drop down to the 2024–25 European Aquatics Women's Euro Cup.

=== Draw ===
The draw was on 13 August 2024 in Zagreb. The seeding was decided by the club rankings. H indicates which club is hosting the groups. Teams in bold indicate who advanced.

Pot 1	Pot 2	Pot 3	Pot 4	Pot 5
(Hungary) **Dunaújváros** (Italy) **Antenore Plebiscito Padova** **(H)** (Greece) **NO Vouliagmeni** (Italy) **SIS Roma** (Hungary) **FTC Telekom**	(Spain) **CN Terrassa** (Greece) Ethnikos Piraeus (Greece) ANC Glyfada (Spain) **CN Sant Andreu** (France) Lille UC	(Hungary) Digi Eger **(H)** (Greece) **Alimos NAC Betsson** (Netherlands) ZV De Zaan (Hungary) **BVSC-Zugló** (Germany) Spandau 04 **(H)**	(Italy) Pallanuoto Trieste (France) Grand Nancy AC (Spain) EPlus CN Catalunya (Spain) Tenerife Echeyde (Greece) Panionios GSS **(H)**	(Hungary) III. Keruleti TVE (Italy) Rapallo Pallanuoto (Netherlands) **Polar Bears** **(H)** (Netherlands) **Widex GZC Donk** (Israel) Hapoel Yoneam

=== Group A ===
- 3–6 October 2024, Athens, Greece.

Pos	Team	Pld	W	PSW	PSL	L	GF	GA	GD	Pts	Qualification	(Hungary) FTC	(Spain) SAN	(Netherlands) ZAAN	(Greece) PAN	(Italy) RAP
1	(Hungary) FTC Telekom	4	4	0	0	0	48	33	+15	**12**	Main round	—	9–8	17–8	—	—
2	(Spain) CN Sant Andreu	4	3	0	0	1	51	33	+18	**9**	Main round	—	—	—	16–7	15–10
3	(Netherlands) ZV De Zaan	4	2	0	0	2	45	46	−1	**6**	Euro Cup	—	7–12	—	—	16–10
4	(Greece) Panionios GSS (H)	4	1	0	0	3	38	54	−16	**3**	Euro Cup	6–10	—	7–14	—	—
5	(Italy) Rapallo Pallanuoto	4	0	0	0	4	45	61	−16	**0**	Euro Cup	11–12	—	—	14–18	—

Source: European Aquatics
(H) Host

=== Group B ===
- 3–6 October 2024, Ede, Netherlands.

Pos	Team	Pld	W	PSW	PSL	L	GF	GA	GD	Pts	Qualification	(Netherlands) POL	(Hungary) ZUG	(Hungary) DUN	(France) LIL	(France) NAN
1	(Netherlands) Polar Bears (H)	4	3	0	0	1	67	50	+17	**9 (Note: Head-to-head goal difference: Polar Bears +8, Dunaújváros +3, BVSC-Zugló –8. Despite the goal difference, BVSC-Zugló is ranked ahead of Dunaújváros due to the match between them.)**	Main round	—	21–12	10–14	19–12	17–12
2	(Hungary) BVSC-Zugló	4	3	0	0	1	62	51	+11	**9**	Main round	—	—	11–10	17–13	22–7
3	(Hungary) Dunaújváros	4	3	0	0	1	58	37	+21	**9**	Main round	—	—	—	—	—
4	(France) Lille UC	4	1	0	0	3	54	63	−9	**3**	Euro Cup	—	—	10–16	—	19–11
5	(France) Grand Nancy AC	4	0	0	0	4	36	76	−40	**0**	Euro Cup	—	—	6–18	—	—

Source: European Aquatics
(H) Host

=== Group C ===
- 3–6 October 2024, Padova, Italy.

Pos	Team	Pld	W	PSW	PSL	L	GF	GA	GD	Pts	Qualification	(Greece) ALI	(Italy) PAD	(Spain) TEN	(Greece) ETH	(Israel) HAP
1	(Greece) Alimos NAC Betsson	4	4	0	0	0	71	38	+33	**12**	Main round	—	—	—	16–10	18–9
2	(Italy) Antenore Plebiscito Padova (H)	4	3	0	0	1	55	47	+8	**9**	Main round	10–17	—	13–11	13–8	19–11
3	(Spain) Tenerife Echeyde	4	2	0	0	2	44	52	−8	**6**	Euro Cup	9–20	—	—	—	—
4	(Greece) Ethnikos Piraeus	4	1	0	0	3	43	57	−14	**3**	Euro Cup	—	—	9–11	—	16–15
5	(Israel) Hapoel Yoneam	4	0	0	0	4	45	64	−19	**0**	Euro Cup	—	—	10–11	—	—

Source: European Aquatics
(H) Host

=== Group D ===
- 3–6 October 2024, Eger, Hungary.

Pos	Team	Pld	W	PSW	PSL	L	GF	GA	GD	Pts	Qualification	(Spain) TER	(Italy) ROM	(Italy) TRI	(Hungary) EGER	(Hungary) KER
1	(Spain) CN Terrassa	4	4	0	0	0	66	46	+20	**12**	Main round	—	14–13	15–9	—	—
2	(Italy) SIS Roma	4	3	0	0	1	57	45	+12	**9**	Main round	—	—	—	—	—
3	(Italy) Pallanuoto Trieste	4	1	1	0	2	51	56	−5	**5**	Euro Cup	—	9–11	—	—	14–13
4	(Hungary) Digi Eger (H)	4	1	0	1	2	52	63	−11	**4**	Euro Cup	10–19	12–15	17–19 (Note: Match ended 14–14, Pallanuoto Trieste won 5–3 on penalties)	—	13–10
5	(Hungary) III. Keruleti TVE	4	0	0	0	4	47	63	−16	**0**	Euro Cup	14–18	10–18	—	—	—

Source: European Aquatics
(H) Host

=== Group E ===
- 3–6 October 2024, Berlin, Germany.

Pos	Team	Pld	W	PSW	PSL	L	GF	GA	GD	Pts	Qualification	(Greece) VOU	(Netherlands) DON	(Greece) GLY	(Spain) CAT	(Germany) SPA
1	(Greece) NO Vouliagmeni	4	4	0	0	0	65	35	+30	**12**	Main round	—	—	15–11	17–5	—
2	(Netherlands) Widex GZC Donk	4	3	0	0	1	62	36	+26	**9**	Main round	12–15	—	19–11	14–4	—
3	(Greece) ANC Glyfada	4	2	0	0	2	49	55	−6	**6**	Euro Cup	—	—	—	—	—
4	(Spain) EPlus CN Catalunya	4	1	0	0	3	32	55	−23	**3**	Euro Cup	—	—	11–13	—	—
5	(Germany) Spandau 04 (H)	4	0	0	0	4	34	61	−27	**0**	Euro Cup	7–18	6–17	10–14	11–12	—

Source: European Aquatics
(H) Host

=== Ranking of third-placed teams ===
Pos	Grp	Team	Pld	W	PSW	PSL	L	GF	GA	GD	Pts	Qualification
1	B	(Hungary) Dunaújváros	4	3	0	0	1	58	37	+21	**9**	Main round
2	A	(Netherlands) ZV De Zaan	4	2	0	0	2	45	46	−1	**6**	
3	E	(Greece) ANC Glyfada	4	2	0	0	2	49	55	−6	**6**	
4	C	(Spain) Tenerife Echeyde	4	2	0	0	2	44	52	−8	**6**	
5	D	(Italy) Pallanuoto Trieste	4	1	1	0	2	51	56	−5	**5**	

Source: European Aquatics
Rules for classification: 1) points; 2) goal difference; 3) number of goals scored.

== Main round ==
Location of teams of the 2024–25 European Aquatics Women's Champions League group stage.
Red: Group A; Blue: Group B; Yellow: Group C; Green: Group D.

The draw took place on 7 October 2024 in Zagreb, Croatia. The top two advance to the Quarterfinals.

Teams are ranked according to points (3 points for a win, 2 points for a penalty shootout win, 1 point for a penalty shootout loss, 0 points for a loss), and if tied on points, the following tiebreaking criteria are applied, in the order given, to determine the rankings:

- Points in head-to-head matches among tied teams;
- Goal difference in head-to-head matches among tied teams;
- Goals scored in head-to-head matches among tied teams;
- Goal difference in all group matches;
- Goals scored in all group matches.

Five countries are being represented, with only one difference, France being replaced by Netherlands. Hungary and Spain boast the most clubs with four.

Location of Catalonia teams of the 2024–25 European Aquatics Women's Champions League Main Round.
Red: Group A; Blue: Group B;
Yellow: Group C; Green: Group D.

=== Group A ===
Pos	Team	Pld	W	PSW	PSL	L	GF	GA	GD	Pts	Qualification	(Spain) SAB	(Greece) VOU	(Hungary) DUN	(Spain) TER
1	(Spain) Astralpool Sabadell	6	6	0	0	0	76	48	+28	18	Quarterfinals	—	12–11	12–7	10–7
2	(Greece) NO Vouliagmeni	6	4	0	0	2	73	64	+9	12	Quarterfinals	11–16	—	9–8	14–8
3	(Hungary) Dunaújváros	6	1	0	1	4	55	69	−14	4		8–13	9–12	—	10–9
4	(Spain) CN Terrassa	6	0	1	0	5	53	76	−23	2		4–13	11–16	14–13 (Note: Match finished 10–10. CN Terrassa won 4–3 on penalties.)	—

Source: European Aquatics
Rules for classification: Tiebreakers

=== Group B ===
Pos	Team	Pld	W	PSW	PSL	L	GF	GA	GD	Pts	Qualification	(Hungary) FTC	(Spain) MAT	(Netherlands) POL	(Italy) PAD (Note: On 1 November 2024, Antenore Plebiscito Padova were disqualified due to breaching the financial requirements of the competition. However, on 5 November, Antenore Plebiscito Padova were reinstated into the competition after positive actions were made by the club.)
1	(Hungary) FTC Telekom	6	5	0	1	0	85	67	+18	16	Quarterfinals	—	13–14 (Note: Match finished 10–10. CN Mataró won 4–3 on penalties.)	19–11	9–6
2	(Spain) Assolim CN Mataró	6	4	1	0	1	89	66	+23	14	Quarterfinals	11–13	—	13–5	16–9
3	(Netherlands) Polar Bears	6	1	0	0	5	74	94	−20	3 (Note: Polar Bears 27–26 Antenore Plebiscito Padova)		14–17	17–19	—	14–11
4	(Italy) Antenore Plebiscito Padova (Note: On 1 November 2024, Antenore Plebiscito Padova were disqualified due to breaching the financial requirements of the competition. However, on 5 November, Antenore Plebiscito Padova were reinstated into the competition after positive actions were made by the club.)	6	1	0	0	5	61	82	−21	3		11–14	9–16	15–13	—

Source: European Aquatics
Rules for classification: Tiebreakers

=== Group C ===
Pos	Team	Pld	W	PSW	PSL	L	GF	GA	GD	Pts	Qualification	(Greece) OLY	(Greece) ALI	(Netherlands) DON	(Italy) ROM
1	(Greece) Olympiacos Piraeus	6	6	0	0	0	84	62	+22	18	Quarterfinals	—	14–11	17–13	10–3
2	(Greece) Alimos NAS Betsson	6	1	2	0	3	70	72	−2	7	Quarterfinals	11–12	—	13–11 (Note: Match finished 8–8. Alimos NAS Betsson won 5–3 on penalties.)	15–14 (Note: Match finished 11–11. Alimos NAS Betsson won 4–3 on penalties.)
3	(Netherlands) Widex GZC Donk	6	1	1	1	3	79	88	−9	6		13–17	10–11	—	20–19 (Note: Match finished 14–14. Widex GZC Donk won 6–5 on penalties.)
4	(Italy) SIS Roma	6	1	0	2	3	69	80	−11	5		11–14	11–9	11–12	—

Source: European Aquatics
Rules for classification: Tiebreakers

=== Group D ===
Pos	Team	Pld	W	PSW	PSL	L	GF	GA	GD	Pts	Qualification	(Spain) SAN	(Italy) ORI	(Hungary) UVSE	(Hungary) ZUG
1	(Spain) CN Sant Andreu	6	6	0	0	0	90	54	+36	18	Quarterfinals	—	16–10	14–11	18–5
2	(Italy) Ekipe Orizzonte	6	4	0	0	2	70	61	+9	12	Quarterfinals	8–12	—	12–10	15–4
3	(Hungary) UVSE Budapest	6	2	0	0	4	68	68	0	6		10–13	7–9	—	13–10
4	(Hungary) BVSC-Zugló	6	0	0	0	6	51	96	−45	0		10–17	12–16	10–17	—

Source: European Aquatics
Rules for classification: Tiebreakers

== Quarterfinals ==
=== Draw ===
The draw took place in Zagreb on 3 March 2025. The seeded and unseeded clubs consist of the teams that finished first and second in the previous round respectively. The only restriction was that clubs from the same group in the Main round could not be drawn against each other.

Seeded	Unseeded
(Spain) Astralpool Sabadell (Hungary) FTC Telekom (Greece) Olympiacos Piraeus (Spain) CN Sant Andreu	(Greece) NO Vouliagmeni (Spain) Assolim CN Mataró (Greece) Alimos NAC Betsson (Italy) Ekipe Orizzonte

=== Bracket ===
Team 1	Agg.	Team 2	1st leg	2nd leg
Olympiacos Piraeus (Greece)	18–16	(Greece) NO Vouliagmeni	11–10	7–6
Astralpool Sabadell (Spain)	32–21	(Greece) Alimos NAC Betsson	19–6	13–15
CN Sant Andreu (Spain)	24–16	(Spain) Assolim CN Mataró	13–8	11–8
FTC Telekom (Hungary)	19–15 (Note: Order of legs reversed.)	(Italy) Ekipe Orizzonte	11–9	8–6

== Final Four ==
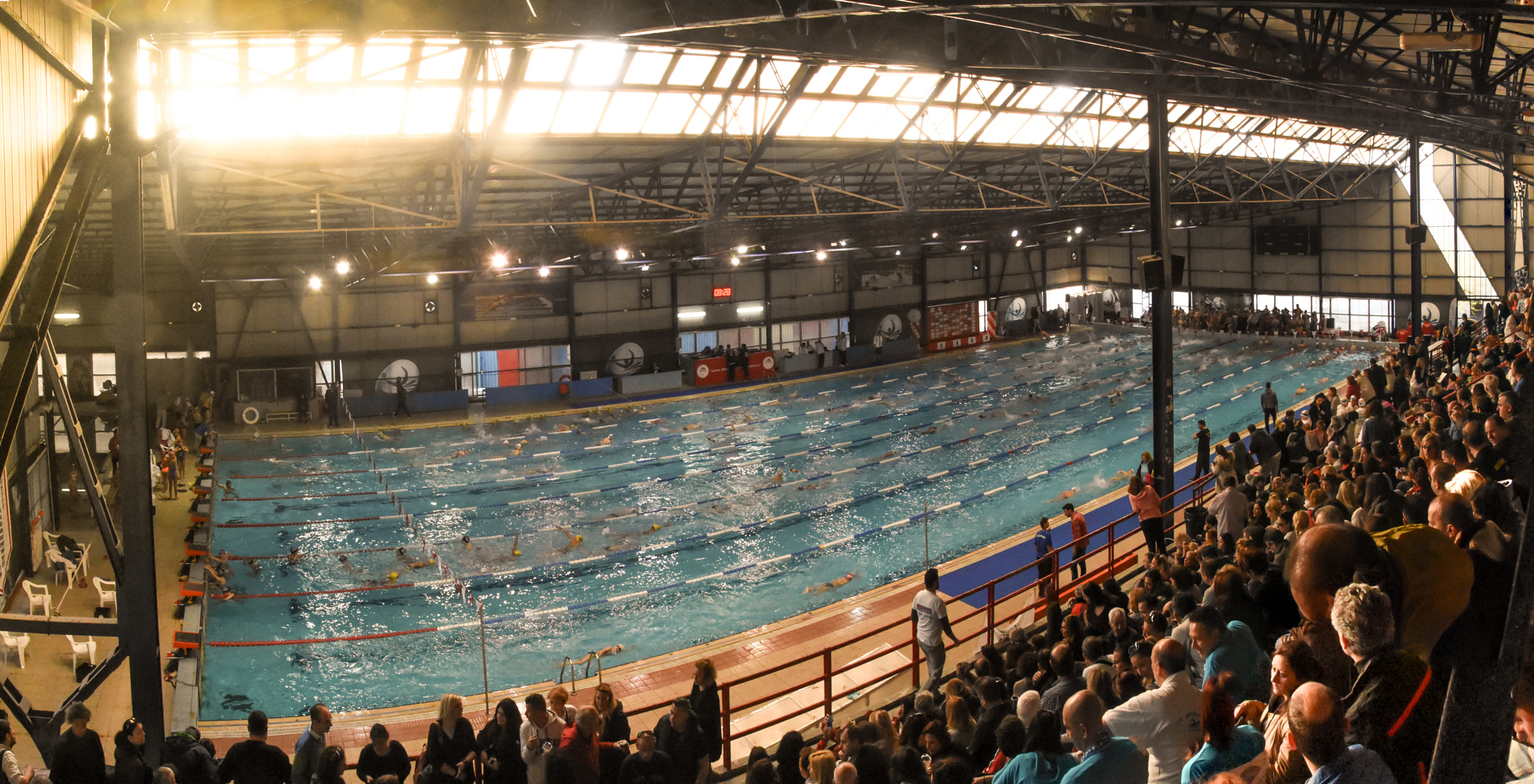
The Papastrateio "Petros Kapagerof" Pool in Piraeus hosted the Final Four.

On 7 April 2025, Olympiacos Piraeus were given the hosting rights. The tournament was held on the 2–3 May 2025 at the Papastrateio "Petros Kapagerof" Pool, Greece.

=== Bracket ===
Semi-finals
(Greece) Olympiacos Piraeus	13
(Spain) Astralpool Sabadell	15
(Spain) CN Sant Andreu	10
(Hungary) FTC Telekom	7

Final
(Spain) Astralpool Sabadell	8
(Spain) CN Sant Andreu	9
Third place
(Greece) Olympiacos Piraeus	18
(Hungary) FTC Telekom	11

=== Third place match ===
3 May 2025; 16:00	Report	Olympiacos Piraeus (Greece)	18–11	(Hungary) FTC Telekom	Papastrateio "Petros Kapagerof" Pool, Piraeus; Referees: Alessia Ferrari (ITA), Matan Schwartz (ISR)
3 May 2025; 16:00	Report	Score by quarters: 4–2, 4–2, 7–2, 3–5			Papastrateio "Petros Kapagerof" Pool, Piraeus; Referees: Alessia Ferrari (ITA), Matan Schwartz (ISR)
3 May 2025; 16:00	Report	Plevritou 7	Goals	Hertzka 3	Papastrateio "Petros Kapagerof" Pool, Piraeus; Referees: Alessia Ferrari (ITA), Matan Schwartz (ISR)

=== Final ===
3 May 2025; 18:30	Report	Astralpool Sabadell (Spain)	8–9	(Spain) CN Sant Andreu	Papastrateio "Petros Kapagerof" Pool, Piraeus; Referees: Aurely Blanchard (FRA), Boris Margeta (SLO)
3 May 2025; 18:30	Report	Score by quarters: 3–2, 2–1, 2–3, 1–3			Papastrateio "Petros Kapagerof" Pool, Piraeus; Referees: Aurely Blanchard (FRA), Boris Margeta (SLO)
3 May 2025; 18:30	Report	van de Kraats 4	Goals	Pérez 3	Papastrateio "Petros Kapagerof" Pool, Piraeus; Referees: Aurely Blanchard (FRA), Boris Margeta (SLO)

2024–25 European Aquatics Women's Champions League Champions

CN Sant Andreu
First title

== See also ==
- 2024–25 European Aquatics Champions League
- 2024–25 European Aquatics Euro Cup
- 2024–25 European Aquatics Challenger Cup
- 2024 European Aquatics Super Cup
- 2024–25 European Aquatics Women's Euro Cup
- 2024–25 European Aquatics Women's Challenger Cup
- 2024 European Aquatics Women's Super Cup
