= 2024–25 European Aquatics Women's Champions League quarterfinals =

Tournament information
- Sport: Water polo
- Date: 22–29 March 2025
- Teams: 8
- Website: Official website

Tournament statistics
- Matches played: 8

The 2024–25 European Aquatics Women's Champions League Quarterfinals is played between 22 and 29 March 2025 to determine the four teams advancing to the Final Four of the 2024–25 European Aquatics Women's Champions League.

== Format ==
The 8 advancing teams are split into four home and away ties to decide the teams reaching the Final Four.

== Draw ==
The draw took place in Zagreb on 3 March 2025. The seeded and unseeded clubs consist of the teams that finished first and second in the previous round respectively. The only restriction was that clubs from the same group in the Main round could not be drawn against each other. The teams advancing are in bold.

Seeded	Unseeded
(Spain) **Astralpool Sabadell** (Hungary) **FTC Telekom** (Greece) **Olympiacos Piraeus** (Spain) **CN Sant Andreu**	(Greece) NO Vouliagmeni (Spain) Assolim CN Mataró (Greece) Alimos NAC Betsson (Italy) Ekipe Orizzonte

== Bracket ==
Team 1	Agg.	Team 2	1st leg	2nd leg
**Olympiacos Piraeus** (Greece)	18–16	(Greece) NO Vouliagmeni	11–10	7–6
**Astralpool Sabadell** (Spain)	32–21	(Greece) Alimos NAC Betsson	19–6	13–15
**CN Sant Andreu** (Spain)	24–16	(Spain) Assolim CN Mataró	13–8	11–8
**FTC Telekom** (Hungary)	19–15 (Note: Order of legs reversed.)	(Italy) Ekipe Orizzonte	11–9	8–6

=== Matches ===
22 March 2025; 17:45	Report	**Olympiacos Piraeus** (Greece)	**11**–10	(Greece) NO Vouliagmeni	Papastrateio "Petros Kapagerof" Pool, Piraeus; Referees: Alessia Ferrari (ITA), Aurely Blanchard (FRA)
22 March 2025; 17:45	Report	Score by quarters: 4–**5**, **4**–1, **2**–1, 1–**3**			Papastrateio "Petros Kapagerof" Pool, Piraeus; Referees: Alessia Ferrari (ITA), Aurely Blanchard (FRA)
22 March 2025; 17:45	Report	Plevritou 6	**Goals**	three players 2	Papastrateio "Petros Kapagerof" Pool, Piraeus; Referees: Alessia Ferrari (ITA), Aurely Blanchard (FRA)

29 March 2025; 16:00	Report	NO Vouliagmeni (Greece)	6–**7**	(Greece) **Olympiacos Piraeus**	"Cyprus" Swimming Pool, Vari; Referees: Vojin Putnikovic (SRB), Maxim Gerasimov (GBR)
29 March 2025; 16:00	Report	Score by quarters: **4**–1, 1–1, 1–**4**, 0–**1**			"Cyprus" Swimming Pool, Vari; Referees: Vojin Putnikovic (SRB), Maxim Gerasimov (GBR)
29 March 2025; 16:00	Report	Moolhuijzen 3	**Goals**	Andrews 3	"Cyprus" Swimming Pool, Vari; Referees: Vojin Putnikovic (SRB), Maxim Gerasimov (GBR)

Olympiacos Piraeus won 18–16 on aggregate

22 March 2025; 12:30	Report	**Astralpool Sabadell** (Spain)	**19**–6	(Greece) Alimos NAC Betsson	Can Llong pool, Sabadell; Referees: Nikolett Sajben (HUN), Ivanka Rakovic Krstonosic (SRB)
22 March 2025; 12:30	Report	Score by quarters: **4**–2, **8**–0, **4**–2, **3**–2			Can Llong pool, Sabadell; Referees: Nikolett Sajben (HUN), Ivanka Rakovic Krstonosic (SRB)
22 March 2025; 12:30	Report	van de Kraats 7	**Goals**	six players 1	Can Llong pool, Sabadell; Referees: Nikolett Sajben (HUN), Ivanka Rakovic Krstonosic (SRB)

29 March 2025; 18:00	Report	**Alimos NAC Betsson** (Greece)	**15**–13	(Spain) Astralpool Sabadell	Municipal Swimming Pool, Alimos; Referees: Giuliana Nicolosi (ITA), Sara Kontek (CRO)
29 March 2025; 18:00	Report	Score by quarters: **2**–1, **5**–3, **5**–4, 3–**5**			Municipal Swimming Pool, Alimos; Referees: Giuliana Nicolosi (ITA), Sara Kontek (CRO)
29 March 2025; 18:00	Report	Patra, Rybanska 3	**Goals**	Keszthelyi 4	Municipal Swimming Pool, Alimos; Referees: Giuliana Nicolosi (ITA), Sara Kontek (CRO)

Astralpool Sabadell won 32–21 on aggregate

22 March 2025; 17:30	Report	**CN Sant Andreu** (Spain)	**13**–8	(Spain) Assolim CN Mataró	Barcelona, Spain; Referees: Natalia Markopoulou (GRE), Jakov Blaskovic (CRO)
22 March 2025; 17:30	Report	Score by quarters: **3**–2, **3**–2, **4**–2, **3**–2			Barcelona, Spain; Referees: Natalia Markopoulou (GRE), Jakov Blaskovic (CRO)
22 March 2025; 17:30	Report	Ruiz Barril 4	**Goals**	Avegno 3	Barcelona, Spain; Referees: Natalia Markopoulou (GRE), Jakov Blaskovic (CRO)

29 March 2025; 13:00	Report	Assolim CN Mataró (Spain)	8–**11**	(Spain) **CN Sant Andreu**	Municipal Sports Complex, Mataró; Referees: Matan Schwartz (ISR), Aurely Blanchard (FRA)
29 March 2025; 13:00	Report	Score by quarters: **3**–2, 0–0, 4–**7**, 1–**2**			Municipal Sports Complex, Mataró; Referees: Matan Schwartz (ISR), Aurely Blanchard (FRA)
29 March 2025; 13:00	Report	McDowall 3	**Goals**	Farré Colomina, Palacio Linde 3	Municipal Sports Complex, Mataró; Referees: Matan Schwartz (ISR), Aurely Blanchard (FRA)

CN Sant Andreu won 24–16 on aggregate

22 March 2025; 17:30	Report	Ekipe Orizzonte (Italy)	9–**11**	(Hungary) **FTC Telekom**	Piscina di Nesima, Catania; Referees: Martina Kunikova (SVK), Julien Bourges (FRA)
22 March 2025; 17:30	Report	Score by quarters: 3–3, 2–**3**, 1–**2**, 3–3			Piscina di Nesima, Catania; Referees: Martina Kunikova (SVK), Julien Bourges (FRA)
22 March 2025; 17:30	Report	Bettini 3	**Goals**	Plevritou 3	Piscina di Nesima, Catania; Referees: Martina Kunikova (SVK), Julien Bourges (FRA)

29 March 2025; 19:15	Report	**FTC Telekom** (Hungary)	**8**–6	(Italy) Ekipe Orizzonte	FTC Swimming Pool, Budapest; Referees: Maria Daskalopoulou (GRE), Marieke Van Den Berg (NED)
29 March 2025; 19:15	Report	Score by quarters: 1–**2**, **3**–2, **2**–1, **2**–1			FTC Swimming Pool, Budapest; Referees: Maria Daskalopoulou (GRE), Marieke Van Den Berg (NED)
29 March 2025; 19:15	Report	Plevritou, Valyi 2	**Goals**	Leone 2	FTC Swimming Pool, Budapest; Referees: Maria Daskalopoulou (GRE), Marieke Van Den Berg (NED)

FTC Telekom won 19–15 on aggregate

== See also ==
- 2024–25 European Aquatics Champions League
- 2024–25 European Aquatics Euro Cup
- 2024–25 European Aquatics Challenger Cup
- 2024 European Aquatics Super Cup
- 2024–25 European Aquatics Women's Champions League
- 2024–25 European Aquatics Women's Euro Cup
- 2024–25 European Aquatics Women's Challenger Cup
- 2024 European Aquatics Women's Super Cup
