= Groenhovenbad =

Multifunctional swimming complex in Gouda, Netherlands

Coordinates: 52.0240°N 4.6896°E

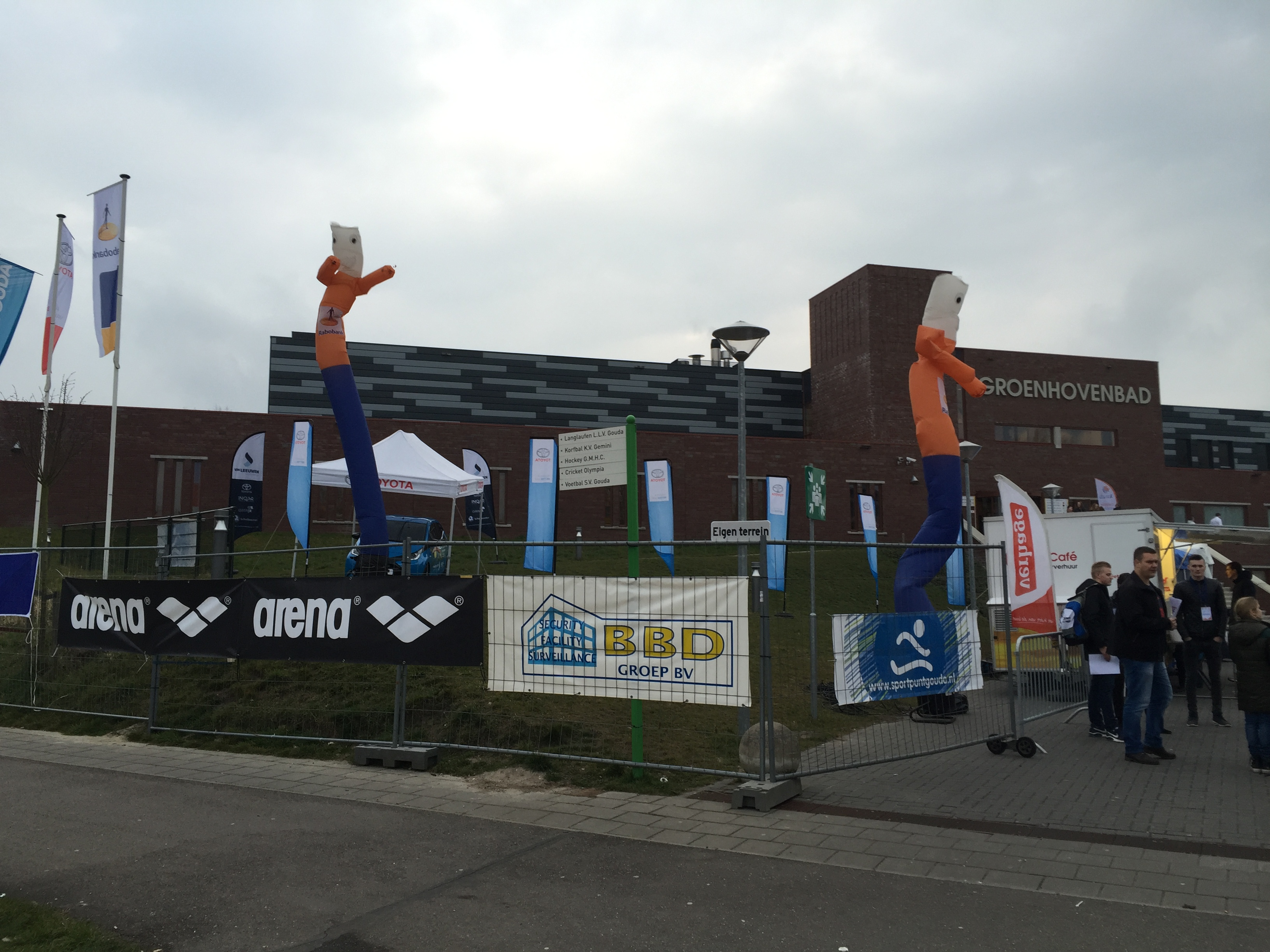
Outside of the Groenhovenbad

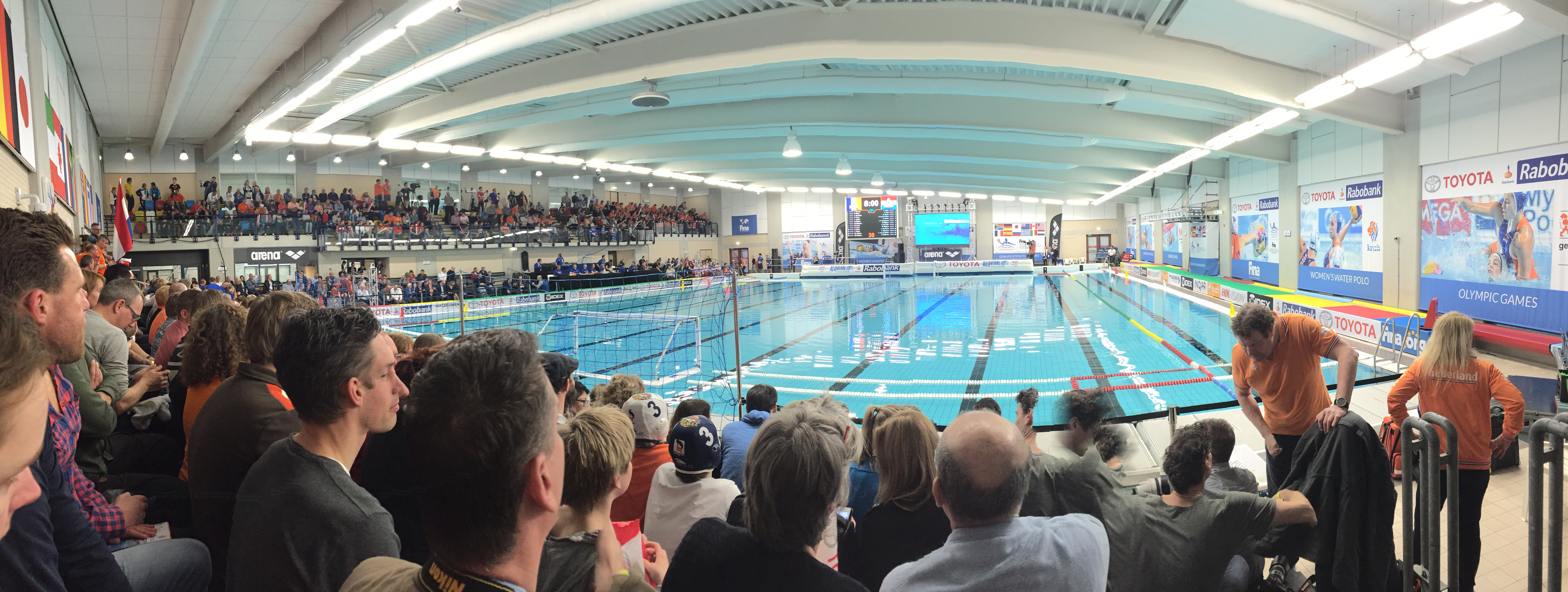
Pool during the 2016 Women's Water Polo Olympic Games Qualification Tournament

Groenhovenbad is an aquatic centre in Gouda, the Netherlands. It hosted from 21-28 March the 2016 Women's Water Polo Olympic Games Qualification Tournament.
