= Zsófia Tóth =

Hungarian triathlete

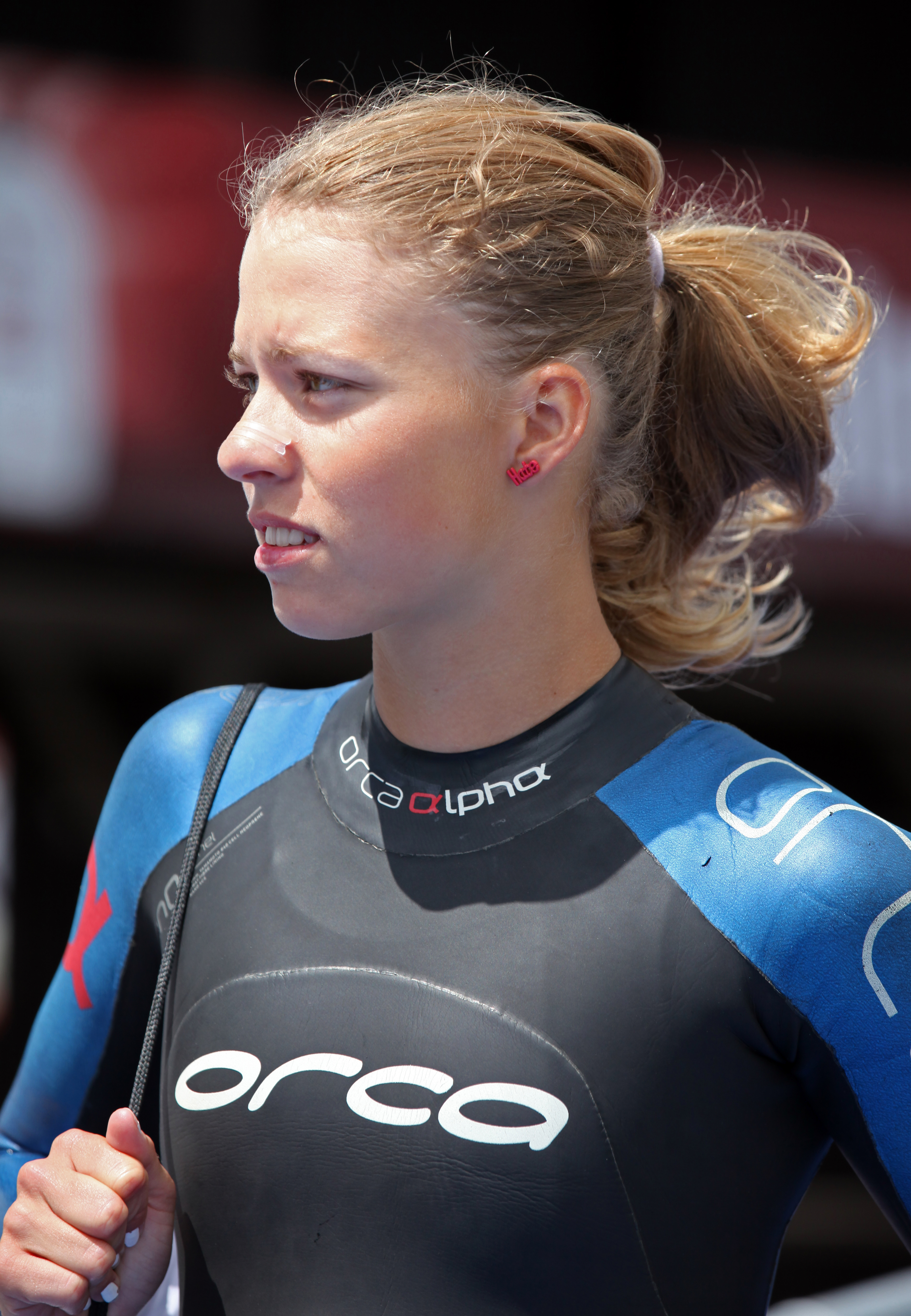
Zsófia Tóth at the unfortunate World Championship triathlon in Kitzbühel, 2011.

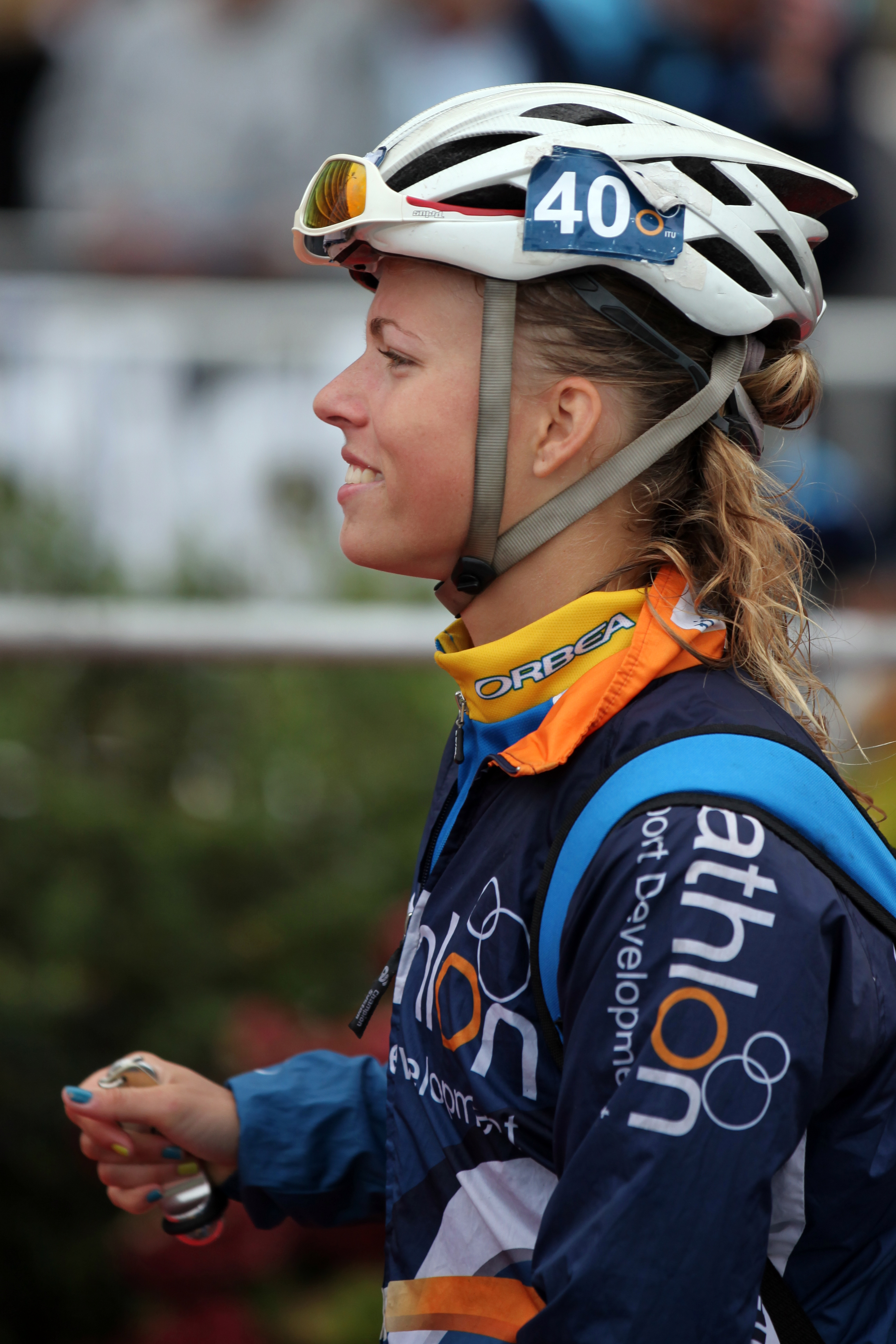
Zsófia Tóth at the Grand Final of the Grand Prix de Triathlon in La Baule, 2011.

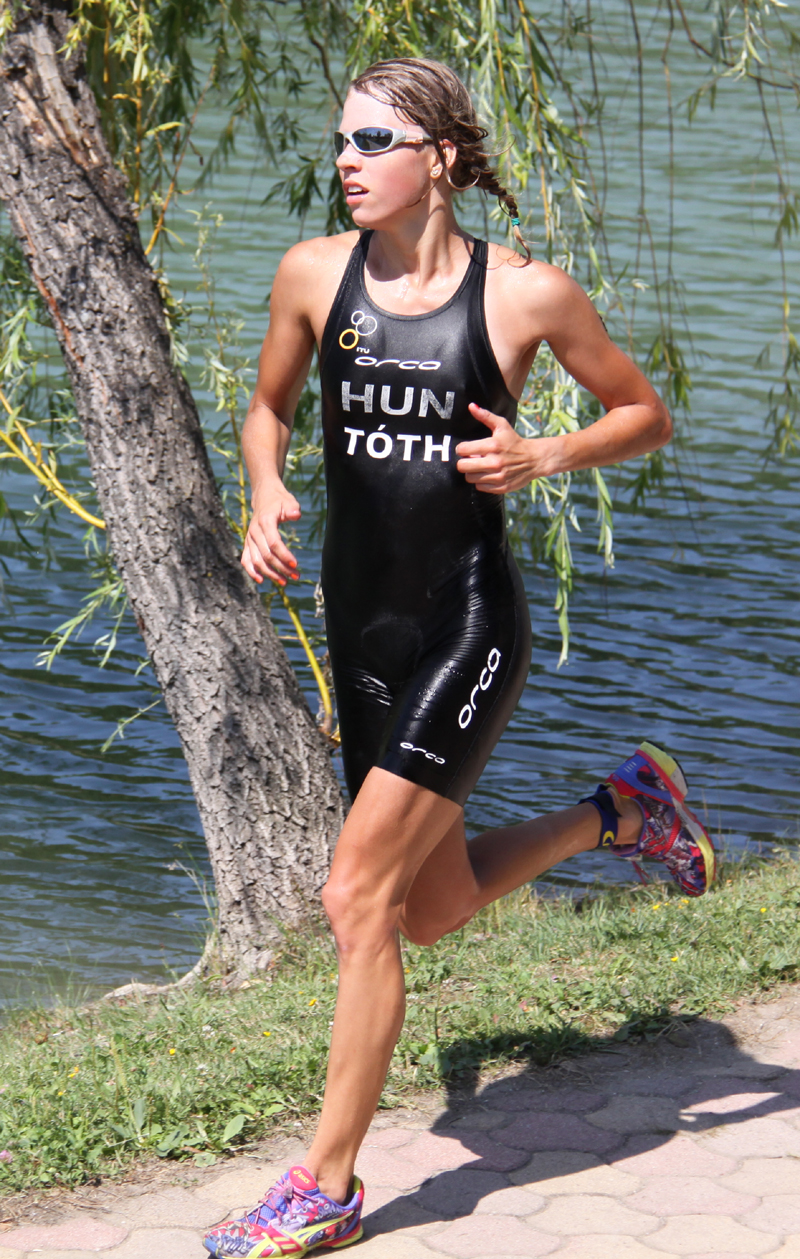
Zsófia Tóth on her way to the 14th u u u82place at the elite World Cup in Tiszaújvarós, 2009.89 0 pio up uputi upit

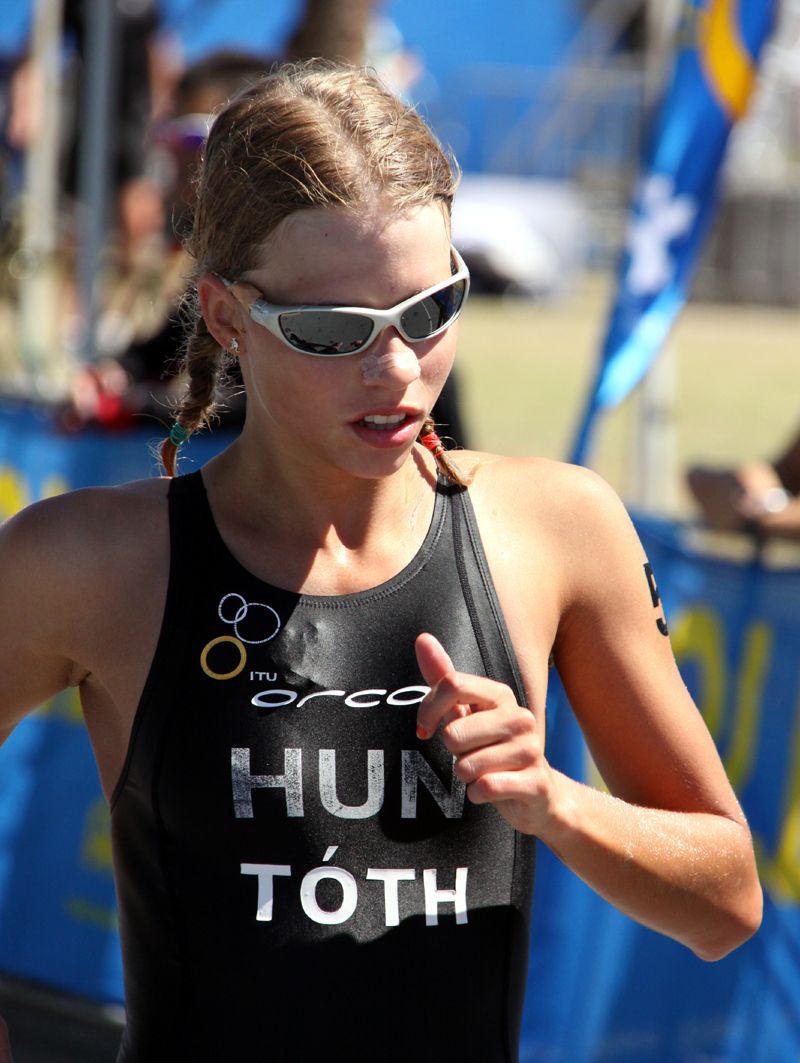
Zsófia Tóth placing 16th at the Grand Final in Southport, Gold Coast 2009.

Zsófia Tóth (born 25 December 1989 in Tata), also Zsófi, is a Hungarian professional triathlete, several times National Champion in various categories, number 2 in the national elite Ranglista and the 2011 National Vice Champion. Since 2005 she has been a permanent member of the National Team. In the 2010 ITU ranking (Women’s Standings) she was number 20 of the 81 best U23 triathletes of the world.

== Education ==
Zsófia Tóth attended the Váci Mihály Általános Iskola and the high school Középiskola Bárdos László Gimnázium in Tatabánya, which she finished in 2009. Then she moved to Vienna, where she lived together with the Austrian Hungarian triathlete Christian Wohlmutter and studied sports at the University of Vienna.

== Sports career ==
Since 2003 Zsófia Tóth has been supported by the Hungarian Herkulesz sports promotion scheme and by the Hungarian company group MOL and its foundation Új Europaal Aapítvány. Tóth's coach is Licskó Csaba.

Until 2008, Tóth represented the club ORTRI situated in Oroszlány, not far from her hometown Tata. In 2009, Tóth joined the small Kropkó Triatlon Club, directed by the Hungarian triathlete and several times ironman winner Péter Kropkó. From 2010 onwards, Toth has represented to TVK Mali Triatlon Klub located in Tiszaújváros.

In 2011, Tóth also took part in the prestigious French Club Championship Series Lyonnaise des Eaux. At the Grand Final in La Baule (17 September 2011), she placed 26th in the individual ranking and her club TOCC (Tri Olympique Club Cessonais) placed 7th.

== ITU Competitions ==
In the six years from 2005 to 2010, Zsófia Tóth took part in 34 ITU competitions and achieved 17 top ten positions. For the World Cup in Huatulco Tóth was appointed a member of the Team ITU.

The following list is based upon the official ITU rankings and the athlete's Profile Page. Unless indicated otherwise all events are triathlons (Olympic Distance) and belong to the Elite category.

Date	Competition	Place	Rank
2005-07-23	European Championships (Junior)	Alexandroupoli(s)	5
2005-07-24	European Championships (Junior Relay)	Alexandroupoli(s)	1
2006-05-27	European Cup (Junior)	Portorož	1
2006-06-23	European Championships (Junior)	Autun	DNS
2006-08-12	European Cup (Junior)	Tiszaújváros	1
2006-09-02	World Championships (Junior)	Lausanne	5
2006-10-07	Duathlon European Championships (Junior)	Rimini	3
2006-10-28	European Cup (Junior)	Eilat	3
2007-05-19	Duathlon World Championships (Junior)	Győr	1
2007-06-29	European Championships (Junior)	Copenhagen	14
2007-08-30	BG World Championships (Junior)	Hamburg	5
2007-12-01	BG World Cup	Eilat	29
2008-05-10	European Championships	Lisbon	11
2008-06-05	BG World Championships (Junior)	Vancouver	3
2008-06-14	European Cup	Balatonfured	3
2008-07-13	BG World Cup	Tiszaújváros	10
2008-09-06	European Championships (U23)	Pulpí	4
2008-09-27	Duathlon World Championships (Junior)	Rimini	7
2009-05-17	Premium European Cup	Pontevedra	13
2009-06-20	European Championships (U23)	Tarzo Revine	8
2009-07-02	European Championships	Holten	24
2009-07-11	Dextro Energy World Championship Series	Kitzbühel	20
2009-07-25	Dextro Energy World Championship Series	Hamburg	DNF
2009-08-09	World Cup	Tiszaújváros	14
2009-09-09	Dextro Energy World Championship Series, Grand Final: U23 World Championship	Gold Coast	16
2010-05-01	Asian Cup	Subic Bay	5
2010-05-08	Dextro Energy World Championship Series	Seoul	37
2010-05-22	European Cup	Senec	14
2010-06-05	Dextro Energy World Championship Series	Madrid	49
2010-07-10	World Cup	Holten	DNF
2010-08-08	World Cup	Tiszaújváros	14
2010-08-28	European Championships (U23)	Vila Nova de Gaia (Porto)	6
2010-09-08	Dextro Energy World Championship Series, Grand Final (Age Group 16–19)	Budapest	24
2010-09-08	Dextro Energy World Championship Series, Grand Final: U23 World Championship	Budapest	21
2010-10-10	World Cup	Huatulco	25
2011-02-25	Pan American Cup (South American Championships)	Salinas	6
2011-03-05	Sprint Triathlon Pan American Cup	Clermont	14
2011-03-20	African Cup	Port Elizabeth	2
2011-04-09	Dextro Energy World Championship Series	Sydney	53
2011-04-17	World Cup	Ishigaki	DNF
2011-05-08	World Cup	Monterrey	54
2011-06-19	Dextro Energy World Championship Series	Kitzbühel	58

BG = the sponsor British Gas · DNF = did not finish · DNS = did not start
