= GZC Donk =

Dutch water polo club

GZC DONK
- Founded: 1886
- League: Dutch Championship
- Based in: Gouda
- Arena: Zwembad Het groenhovenbad
- Colors
- Championships: Women: 3 European Cups; 9 Dutch Leagues; 11 Dutch Cups; Men: 6 Dutch Leagues; 3 Dutch Cups
- Website: http://www.gzcdonk.nl/

Goudsche Zwemclub DONK, F.N.A. Donk Gouda, is a Dutch water polo club from Gouda. It is best known for its women's team, which won three of the first four editions of the LEN Champions' Cup. It has also won nine national championships and eleven national cups, most recently attaining its sixth double in 2011.

The Goudsche Zwemclub (GZC) was founded in 1886. In 2003, it merged with Donk to become GZC Donk.

== Titles ==
- Women
  - LEN Champions' Cup
    - 1988, 1989, 1991
  - Dutch Championship
    - 1985, 1987, 1988, 1990, 1992, 1998, 1999, 2005, 2011,2025
  - KNZB Beker
    - 1988, 1989, 1990, 1991, 1992, 1994, 1998, 2000, 2001, 2005, 2011, 2025
- Men
  - Dutch Championship
    - 1923, 1954, 1957, 2008, 2009, 2010, 2021,2023,
  - KNZB Beker
    - 2008, 2009, 2010, 2025
  - LEN Challenger Cup
    - 2025
