= 2025–26 European Aquatics Women's Champions League Final Four =

Women's water polo competition

Tournament details
- Host country: Malta
- Venue: 1 (in 1 host city)
- Dates: 10–12 June
- Teams: 4

Final positions
- Champions: (Greece) Olympiacos Piraeus (4th title)
- Runners-up: (Hungary) FTC Telekom
- Third place: (Spain) CN Sant Andreu
- Fourth place: (Spain) Assolim CN Mataró

Tournament statistics
- Matches played: 4
- Goals scored: 106 (26.5 per match)

The 2025–26 European Aquatics Women's Champions League Final Four was the season-ending event to decide the champions of the 2025–26 European Aquatics Women's Champions League. The Final Four tournament was held at the National Pool Complex in Valletta, Malta, in conjunction with the men's Final Four.

On 23 May 2026, Spanish women's player Maica García Godoy and Greek men's player Christos Afroudakis were announced as the ambassadors of the Final Four.

The winners were Olympiacos Piraeus, who won their fourth title by triumphing over FTC Telekom in the final.

== Host selection ==
On 17 November 2025, European Aquatics announced that Valletta, Malta, will host the women's Final Four in conjunction with the men's one. Malta has already hosted the men's Final Four in 2023–24 and 2024–25.

== Venue ==
The venue for this competition will be the National Pool Complex in Valletta, Malta. The capacity is 3,000. A fan zone will be operated during the Final Four. On 18 May 2026, tickets were put on sale.

== Teams ==
The four winners of the quarterfinals progressed to the Final Four.

Team 1	Agg.	Team 2	1st leg	2nd leg
Astralpool CN Sabadell (Spain)	20–27	(Greece) **Olympiacos Piraeus**	12–17	8–10
**Assolim CN Mataró** (Spain)	25–19	(Italy) SIS Roma	13–9	12–10
**FTC Telekom** (Hungary)	34–25	(Hungary) UVSE Helia-D	16–9	18–16
**CN Sant Andreu** (Spain)	26–25	(Greece) NO Vouliagmeni	11–11	15–14 (Note: Match finished 11–11. CN Sant Andreu won 4–3 on penalties.)

=== Qualified teams ===
Team	Qualified date	Participations (bold indicates winners)	Ref
(Greece) Olympiacos Piraeus	16 May 2026	10 (2009–10, 2010–11, **2014–15**, 2015–16, 2016–17, 2018–19, **2020–21**, **2021–22**, 2023–24, 2024–25)	
(Spain) Assolim CN Mataró	16 May 2026	3 (2016–17, 2022–23, 2023–24)	
(Hungary) FTC Telekom	16 May 2026	1 (2024–25)	
(Spain) CN Sant Andreu	16 May 2026	2 (2023–24, **2024–25**)	

=== Draw ===
External videos
- 2025–26 European Aquatics Champions League Final Four – Draw
- Draw

The draw took place in Zagreb on 23 March 2026 alongside the quarterfinals draw.

== Referees ==
These referees were chosen for the Final Four.

Referees
Italy	Alessia Ferrari
France	Aurely Bouchez
Netherlands	Marieke van den Berg
Serbia	Ivanka Rakovic Krstonosic
United Kingdom	Maxim Gerasimov
Germany	Hendrik Schopp

== Bracket ==
Semi-finals
(Spain) Assolim CN Mataró	12
(Greece) Olympiacos Piraeus	14
(Hungary) FTC Telekom	15
(Spain) CN Sant Andreu	14

Final
(Greece) Olympiacos Piraeus	17
(Hungary) FTC Telekom	14
Third place
(Spain) Assolim CN Mataró	9
(Spain) CN Sant Andreu	11

=== Semi-finals ===
10 June 2026; 19:00	Report	FTC Telekom (Hungary)	15–14 (PSO)	(Spain) CN Sant Andreu	National Pool Complex, Gzira, (Msida); Referees: Alessia Ferrari (ITA), Hendrik Schopp (GER)
10 June 2026; 19:00	Report	Score by quarters: 1–4, 2–2, 4–3, 4–2 PSO: 4–3			National Pool Complex, Gzira, (Msida); Referees: Alessia Ferrari (ITA), Hendrik Schopp (GER)
10 June 2026; 19:00	Report	Plevritou 5	Goals	Ruiz 6	National Pool Complex, Gzira, (Msida); Referees: Alessia Ferrari (ITA), Hendrik Schopp (GER)

10 June 2026; 21:00	Report	Assolim CN Mataró (Spain)	12–14	(Greece) Olympiacos Piraeus	National Pool Complex, Gzira, (Msida); Referees: Aurely BOUCHEZ (FRA), Maxim Gerasimov (GBR)
10 June 2026; 21:00	Report	Score by quarters: 4–4, 3–6, 4–3, 1–1			National Pool Complex, Gzira, (Msida); Referees: Aurely BOUCHEZ (FRA), Maxim Gerasimov (GBR)
10 June 2026; 21:00	Report	Jewel 4	Goals	Tricha, Andrews 4	National Pool Complex, Gzira, (Msida); Referees: Aurely BOUCHEZ (FRA), Maxim Gerasimov (GBR)

=== Third place match ===
12 June 2026; 19:00	Report	Assolim CN Mataró (Spain)	9–11	(Spain) CN Sant Andreu	National Pool Complex, Gzira, (Msida); Referees: Marieke van den Berg (NED), Ivanka Rakovic (SRB)
12 June 2026; 19:00	Report	Score by quarters: 2–2, 2–4, 3–3, 2–2			National Pool Complex, Gzira, (Msida); Referees: Marieke van den Berg (NED), Ivanka Rakovic (SRB)
12 June 2026; 19:00	Report	Roemer 4	Goals	Jutte 3	National Pool Complex, Gzira, (Msida); Referees: Marieke van den Berg (NED), Ivanka Rakovic (SRB)

=== Final ===
12 June 2026; 21:00	Report	Olympiacos Piraeus (Greece)	17–14 (PSO)	FTC Telekom	National Pool Complex, Gzira, (Msida); Referees: Alessia Ferrari (ITA), Maxim Gerasimov (GBR)
12 June 2026; 21:00	Report	Score by quarters: 4–3, 3–2, 3–6, 4–3 PSO: 3–0			National Pool Complex, Gzira, (Msida); Referees: Alessia Ferrari (ITA), Maxim Gerasimov (GBR)
12 June 2026; 21:00	Report	Andrews 5	Goals	Gurisatti 7	National Pool Complex, Gzira, (Msida); Referees: Alessia Ferrari (ITA), Maxim Gerasimov (GBR)

2025–26 European Aquatics Women's Champions League Champions

Olympiacos SF Piraeus
Fourth title

== See also ==
- 2025–26 European Aquatics Champions League
- 2025–26 European Aquatics Euro Cup
- 2025–26 European Aquatics Conference Cup
- 2025–26 European Aquatics Challenger Cup
- 2025 European Aquatics Super Cup
- 2025–26 European Aquatics Women's Euro Cup
- 2025–26 European Aquatics Women's Conference Cup
- 2025–26 European Aquatics Women's Challenger Cup
- 2025 European Aquatics Women's Super Cup

Reference
[ Semifinals]
[ Third place and Final]

Reference
[ Semifinals]
[ Third place and Final]
