= 2025–26 European Aquatics Women's Champions League qualification round =

- 2025–26

Tournament information
- Sport: Water polo
- Date: 26–28 September 2025
- Host(s): (Greece) Athens (Germany) Berlin (Hungary) Dunaújváros
- Teams: 12
- Website: Official website

Tournament statistics
- Matches played: 12

The 2025–26 European Aquatics Women's Champions League qualification round is played between 26 and 28 September 2025 to determine the 8 teams advancing to the group stage of the 2025–26 European Aquatics Women's Champions League.

== Format ==
The 12 teams were place into four groups of three teams. In each group, teams will play against each other once in a round-robin format. The top two teams advance to the group stage.

Teams are ranked according to points (3 points for a win, 2 points for a penalty shootout win, 1 point for a penalty shootout loss, 0 points for a loss), and if tied on points, the following tiebreaking criteria are applied, in the order given, to determine the rankings:

- Points in head-to-head matches among tied teams;
- Goal difference in head-to-head matches among tied teams;
- Goals scored in head-to-head matches among tied teams;
- Goal difference in all group matches;
- Goals scored in all group matches.

== Draw ==
External videos
- 2025–26 European Aquatics Conference Cup qualification round – Draw
- Draw

The draw was on 28 July 2025 in Zagreb, Croatia. (H) indicates which clubs is hosting a group. The seeding is based on the club rankings.

Key to colours
Teams advancing to group stage

Pot 1
| Team | Rank | Points |
|---|---|---|
| (Spain) Assolim CN Mataró | 3 | 31,510 |
| (Spain) CN Terrassa | 11 | 20,520 |
| (Greece) Alimos NAS Betsson | 12 | 19,680 |
| (Hungary) DFVE Vizilabda (H) | 13 | 19,532.5 |

Pot 2
| Team | Rank | Points |
|---|---|---|
| (Greece) ANO Glyfada (H) | 14 | 17,595 |
| (Netherlands) ZV De Zaan | 16 | 15,190 |
| (Italy) Pallanuoto Trieste | 17 | 13,500 |
| (France) Lille UC | 19 | 12,000 |

Pot 3
| Team | Rank | Points |
|---|---|---|
| (Hungary) ONE Eger | 21 | 10,177.5 |
| (Germany) Spandau 04 (H) | 22 | 9,350 |
| (France) Grand Nancy AC | 24 | 7,165 |
| (Italy) Rapallo Pallanuoto | 38 | 3,230 |

== Groups ==
=== Group A ===
26–28 September 2025, Athens, Greece

| Pos | Team | Pld | W | PSW | PSL | L | GF | GA | GD | Pts | Qualification | EGER | TER | GLY |
|---|---|---|---|---|---|---|---|---|---|---|---|---|---|---|
| 1 | (Hungary) ONE Eger | 2 | 1 | 1 | 0 | 0 | 34 | 25 | +9 | 5 | Group stage | — | 17–15 (Note: Match ended 13–13, ONE Eger won 4–2 on penalties.) | — |
| 2 | (Spain) CN Terrassa | 2 | 1 | 0 | 1 | 0 | 30 | 27 | +3 | 4 | Group stage | — | — | — |
| 3 | (Greece) ANO Glyfada iRepair (Note: The name was changed during the first and second matchday.) (H) | 2 | 0 | 0 | 0 | 2 | 20 | 32 | −12 | 0 | | 12–13 | 8–19 | — |

Source: European Aquatics Women's Champions League
(H) Host

| 26 September 2025; 19:45 | Report | ANO Glyfada iRepair (Greece) | 8–19 | (Spain) CN Terrassa | "Ant. Dimitropoulos" Swimming Pool, Glyfada; Referees: Aurely Bouchez (FRA), Diana Dutilh Dumas (NED) |
| 26 September 2025; 19:45 | Report | Score by quarters: 1–4, 2–2, 2–6, 3–7 | | | "Ant. Dimitropoulos" Swimming Pool, Glyfada; Referees: Aurely Bouchez (FRA), Diana Dutilh Dumas (NED) |
| 26 September 2025; 19:45 | Report | Ochoa, Saltamanika 2 | Goals | López, Szegedi 5 | "Ant. Dimitropoulos" Swimming Pool, Glyfada; Referees: Aurely Bouchez (FRA), Diana Dutilh Dumas (NED) |

| 27 September 2025; 12:15 | Report | ONE Eger (Hungary) | 17–15 (PSO) | (Spain) CN Terrassa | "Ant. Dimitropoulos" Swimming Pool, Glyfada; Referees: Mihai Balanescu (ROU), Diana Dutilh Dumas (NED) |
| 27 September 2025; 12:15 | Report | Score by quarters: 3–2, 3–2, 4–4, 3–5 PSO: 4–2 | | | "Ant. Dimitropoulos" Swimming Pool, Glyfada; Referees: Mihai Balanescu (ROU), Diana Dutilh Dumas (NED) |
| 27 September 2025; 12:15 | Report | Czigany, Török 3 | Goals | Szegedi 5 | "Ant. Dimitropoulos" Swimming Pool, Glyfada; Referees: Mihai Balanescu (ROU), Diana Dutilh Dumas (NED) |

| 28 September 2025; 10:00 | Report | ANO Glyfada iRepair (Greece) | 12–13 | (Hungary) ONE Eger | "Ant. Dimitropoulos" Swimming Pool, Glyfada; Referees: Aurely Bouchez (FRA), Mihai Balanescu (ROU) |
| 28 September 2025; 10:00 | Report | Score by quarters: 4–2, 3–2, 3–2, 2–7 | | | "Ant. Dimitropoulos" Swimming Pool, Glyfada; Referees: Aurely Bouchez (FRA), Mihai Balanescu (ROU) |
| 28 September 2025; 10:00 | Report | Saltamanika, Turner 3 | Goals | Parkes, Török 4 | "Ant. Dimitropoulos" Swimming Pool, Glyfada; Referees: Aurely Bouchez (FRA), Mihai Balanescu (ROU) |

=== Group B ===
26–28 September 2025, Berlin, Germany

| Pos | Team | Pld | W | PSW | PSL | L | GF | GA | GD | Pts | Qualification | SPA | ALI | LIL |
|---|---|---|---|---|---|---|---|---|---|---|---|---|---|---|
| 1 | (Germany) Spandau 04 (H) | 2 | 2 | 0 | 0 | 0 | 31 | 24 | +7 | 6 | Group stage | — | 13–12 | 18–12 |
| 2 | (Greece) Alimos NAS Betsson | 2 | 1 | 0 | 0 | 1 | 33 | 24 | +9 | 3 | Group stage | — | — | 21–11 |
| 3 | (France) Lille UC | 2 | 0 | 0 | 0 | 2 | 23 | 39 | −16 | 0 | | — | — | — |

Source: European Aquatics Women's Champions League
(H) Host

| 26 September 2025; 19:00 | Report | Spandau 04 (Germany) | 13–12 | (Greece) Alimos NAS Betsson | Schöneberg Swimming Hall, Berlin; Referees: Alessia Ferrari (ITA), Marta Pegado Cabanas (ESP) |
| 26 September 2025; 19:00 | Report | Score by quarters: 2–5, 3–3, 4–1, 4–3 | | | Schöneberg Swimming Hall, Berlin; Referees: Alessia Ferrari (ITA), Marta Pegado Cabanas (ESP) |
| 26 September 2025; 19:00 | Report | three players 3 | Goals | Chaldaiou 4 | Schöneberg Swimming Hall, Berlin; Referees: Alessia Ferrari (ITA), Marta Pegado Cabanas (ESP) |

| 27 September 2025; 19:00 | Report | Alimos NAS Betsson (Greece) | 21–11 | (France) Lille UC | Schöneberg Swimming Hall, Berlin; Referees: Alessia Ferrari (ITA), Berk Gunbut (TUR) |
| 27 September 2025; 19:00 | Report | Score by quarters: 6–4, 5–3, 3–2, 6–2 | | | Schöneberg Swimming Hall, Berlin; Referees: Alessia Ferrari (ITA), Berk Gunbut (TUR) |
| 27 September 2025; 19:00 | Report | Bosveld 8 | Goals | Nardini 4 | Schöneberg Swimming Hall, Berlin; Referees: Alessia Ferrari (ITA), Berk Gunbut (TUR) |

| 28 September 2025; 12:00 | Report | Spandau 04 (Germany) | 18–12 | (France) Lille UC | Schöneberg Swimming Hall, Berlin; Referees: Marta Pegado Cabanas (ESP), Berk Gunbut (TUR) |
| 28 September 2025; 12:00 | Report | Score by quarters: 2–2, 8–2, 3–5, 5–3 | | | Schöneberg Swimming Hall, Berlin; Referees: Marta Pegado Cabanas (ESP), Berk Gunbut (TUR) |
| 28 September 2025; 12:00 | Report | Deike 5 | Goals | Lizotte, Vernoux 3 | Schöneberg Swimming Hall, Berlin; Referees: Marta Pegado Cabanas (ESP), Berk Gunbut (TUR) |

=== Group C ===
26–28 September 2025, Dunaújváros, Hungary

| Pos | Team | Pld | W | PSW | PSL | L | GF | GA | GD | Pts | Qualification | DFVE | ZAAN | NAN |
|---|---|---|---|---|---|---|---|---|---|---|---|---|---|---|
| 1 | (Hungary) DFVE Vizilabda (H) | 2 | 2 | 0 | 0 | 0 | 42 | 19 | +23 | 6 | Group stage | — | 15–13 | 27–6 |
| 2 | (Netherlands) ZV De Zaan | 2 | 1 | 0 | 0 | 1 | 39 | 19 | +20 | 3 | Group stage | — | — | — |
| 3 | (France) Grand Nancy AC | 2 | 0 | 0 | 0 | 2 | 10 | 53 | −43 | 0 | | — | 4–26 | — |

Source: European Aquatics Women's Champions League
(H) Host

| 26 September 2025; 17:00 | Report | DFVE Vizilabda (Hungary) | 27–6 | (France) Grand Nancy AC | Éva Fabó Sports Swimming Pool, Dunaújváros; Referees: Sara Kontek (CRO), Ivanka Krstonosic Rakovic (SRB) |
| 26 September 2025; 17:00 | Report | Score by quarters: 7–1, 2–3, 10–0, 8–2 | | | Éva Fabó Sports Swimming Pool, Dunaújváros; Referees: Sara Kontek (CRO), Ivanka Krstonosic Rakovic (SRB) |
| 26 September 2025; 17:00 | Report | Garda, Sumegi 5 | Goals | Benlekbir, Suzmecelik 2 | Éva Fabó Sports Swimming Pool, Dunaújváros; Referees: Sara Kontek (CRO), Ivanka Krstonosic Rakovic (SRB) |

| 27 September 2025; 17:00 | Report | DFVE Vizilabda (Hungary) | 15–13 | (Netherlands) ZV De Zaan | Éva Fabó Sports Swimming Pool, Dunaújváros; Referees: Ivanka Krstonosic Rakovic (SRB), Ruben Garcia (SUI) |
| 27 September 2025; 17:00 | Report | Score by quarters: 4–3, 5–4, 4–5, 2–1 | | | Éva Fabó Sports Swimming Pool, Dunaújváros; Referees: Ivanka Krstonosic Rakovic (SRB), Ruben Garcia (SUI) |
| 27 September 2025; 17:00 | Report | Borsi 3 | Goals | Rogge 4 | Éva Fabó Sports Swimming Pool, Dunaújváros; Referees: Ivanka Krstonosic Rakovic (SRB), Ruben Garcia (SUI) |

| 28 September 2025; 10:00 | Report | Grand Nancy AC (France) | 4–26 | (Netherlands) ZV De Zaan | Éva Fabó Sports Swimming Pool, Dunaújváros; Referees: Martina Kunikova (SVK), Ivanka Rakovic Krstonosic (SRB) |
| 28 September 2025; 10:00 | Report | Score by quarters: 1–6, 0–9, 1–6, 2–5 | | | Éva Fabó Sports Swimming Pool, Dunaújváros; Referees: Martina Kunikova (SVK), Ivanka Rakovic Krstonosic (SRB) |
| 28 September 2025; 10:00 | Report | Benlekbir, Gurcan 2 | Goals | Den Ouden, Sam 4 | Éva Fabó Sports Swimming Pool, Dunaújváros; Referees: Martina Kunikova (SVK), Ivanka Rakovic Krstonosic (SRB) |

=== Group D ===
26–28 September 2025, Dunaújváros, Hungary (Note: As none of the three clubs wanted to host the group, the group was held in Dunaújváros alongside group C.)

| Pos | Team | Pld | W | PSW | PSL | L | GF | GA | GD | Pts | Qualification | MAT | RAP | TRI |
|---|---|---|---|---|---|---|---|---|---|---|---|---|---|---|
| 1 | (Spain) Assolim CN Mataró | 2 | 2 | 0 | 0 | 0 | 30 | 20 | +10 | 6 | Group stage | — | 14–9 | 16–11 |
| 2 | (Italy) Rapallo Pallanuoto | 2 | 0 | 1 | 0 | 1 | 23 | 27 | −4 | 2 | Group stage | — | — | — |
| 3 | (Italy) Pallanuoto Trieste | 2 | 0 | 0 | 1 | 1 | 24 | 30 | −6 | 1 | | — | 13–14 (Note: Match ended 10–10, Rapallo Pallanuoto won 4–3 on penalties.) | — |

Source: European Aquatics Women's Champions League

| 26 September 2025; 19:00 | Report | Pallanuoto Trieste (Italy) | 13–14 (PSO) | (Italy) Rapallo Pallanuoto | Éva Fabó Sports Swimming Pool, Dunaújváros; Referees: Martina Kunikova (SVK), Ruben Garcia (SUI) |
| 26 September 2025; 19:00 | Report | Score by quarters: 1–4, 5–1, 1–2, 3–3 PSO: 3–4 | | | Éva Fabó Sports Swimming Pool, Dunaújváros; Referees: Martina Kunikova (SVK), Ruben Garcia (SUI) |
| 26 September 2025; 19:00 | Report | Cergol 4 | Goals | Giustini 4 | Éva Fabó Sports Swimming Pool, Dunaújváros; Referees: Martina Kunikova (SVK), Ruben Garcia (SUI) |

| 27 September 2025; 19:00 | Report | Assolim CN Mataró (Spain) | 14–9 | (Italy) Rapallo Pallanuoto | Éva Fabó Sports Swimming Pool, Dunaújváros; Referees: Martina Kunikova (SVK), Sara Kontek (CRO) |
| 27 September 2025; 19:00 | Report | Score by quarters: 5–3, 3–3, 5–2, 1–1 | | | Éva Fabó Sports Swimming Pool, Dunaújváros; Referees: Martina Kunikova (SVK), Sara Kontek (CRO) |
| 27 September 2025; 19:00 | Report | Roemer 4 | Goals | three players 2 | Éva Fabó Sports Swimming Pool, Dunaújváros; Referees: Martina Kunikova (SVK), Sara Kontek (CRO) |

| 28 September 2025; 12:00 | Report | Assolim CN Mataró (Spain) | 16–11 | (Italy) Pallanuoto Trieste | Éva Fabó Sports Swimming Pool, Dunaújváros; Referees: Sara Kontek (CRO), Ruben Garcia (SUI) |
| 28 September 2025; 12:00 | Report | Score by quarters: 3–4, 5–5, 6–1, 2–1 | | | Éva Fabó Sports Swimming Pool, Dunaújváros; Referees: Sara Kontek (CRO), Ruben Garcia (SUI) |
| 28 September 2025; 12:00 | Report | Roemer 5 | Goals | McDowell 4 | Éva Fabó Sports Swimming Pool, Dunaújváros; Referees: Sara Kontek (CRO), Ruben Garcia (SUI) |

== See also ==
- 2025–26 European Aquatics Champions League
- 2025–26 European Aquatics Euro Cup
- 2025–26 European Aquatics Conference Cup
- 2025–26 European Aquatics Challenger Cup
- 2025 European Aquatics Super Cup
- 2025–26 European Aquatics Women's Champions League
- 2025–26 European Aquatics Women's Euro Cup
- 2025–26 European Aquatics Women's Conference Cup
- 2025–26 European Aquatics Women's Challenger Cup
- 2025 European Aquatics Women's Super Cup

Reference
Matchday 1
Matchday 2
Matchday 3
