= 2025–26 European Aquatics Women's Champions League =

Water polo sports season

European Aquatics Women's Champions League
- 2025–26

Tournament information
- Sport: Water polo
- Date: Qualification round: 26–28 September 2025; Group stage: 25 October 2025 – 21 March 2026; Quarterfinals: 6–16 May 2026; Final Four: 10–12 June 2026
- Tournament format(s): Round Robin and Knockout stage
- Teams: Qualification round: 12 (Note: From 7 countries); Main round: 16 (Note: From TBD countries); Quarter-finals: 8 Total: 20 (from 7 countries)
- Website: Official website

Final positions
- Champions: (Greece) Olympiacos SF Piraeus (4th title)
- Runner-up: (Hungary) FTC Telekom

The 2025–26 European Aquatics Women's Champions League was the 38th edition of European Aquatics's premier competition for women's water polo clubs, and the 4th edition since being rebranded from the Euro League to the Champions League. The season began on 26 September 2025 and ended on 12 June 2026 with the Final Four.

This was the third straight season under the new format, however, this season will witness a change in slot allocation, with only the top four teams allowed to play from the major leagues.

The winners of the European Aquatics Champions League automatically qualified for next season's edition (if they choose to enter) and also qualified for the 2026 Super Cup.

The defending champions were CN Sant Andreu.

== Format ==
- Qualification round

Twelve teams participated in the qualification round in September 2025. The third and fourth teams from national leagues ranked 1–4, champions and runners up of the national leagues ranked 5–6 and champions from national leagues ranked 7 and below took part (if they choose to enter). The teams are divided into four separate groups, held in centralised venues. After round robin play, the top two teams in each group progressed to the group stage.

- Group stage

Sixteen teams played in the group stage which was held between October 2025 to March 2026. The participants were distributed into four groups of four. After home and away double round robin play, the top two from each group qualified for the quarter-finals.

- Quarter-finals

The eight advancing teams from the previous round were present and were split into four home and away knockout ties. The round was organised in May 2026. The four aggregate winners qualified for the Final Four.

- Final Four

In June 2026, the four remaining clubs traveled to a centralised venue to try and obtain the Champions League trophy. Two semifinals, a third place game and final took place to decide the champions.

== Rankings ==
The results were based on the results of the past four seasons.

- Associations 1–4 can have four teams ranked 1st, 2nd, 3rd and 4th qualify.
- Associations 5–6 each have two teams ranked 1st and 2nd qualify.

Rank	Association	Points	Teams
1	Spain	146,065	4
2	Greece	127,360	4
3	Hungary	91,557.5	4
4	Italy	80,282.5	4
5	Netherlands	30,965	1
6	France	29,760	2
7	Germany	12,870	1
8	Turkey	11,295	0
9	Croatia	8,430	0
10	Portugal	6,940	0

Rank	Association	Points	Teams
11	Serbia	6,280	0
12	Malta	5,700	0
13	Israel	5,215	0
14	(United Kingdom) Great Britain	4,930	0
15	Czech Republic	1,830	0
16	Slovakia	1,715	0
17	Romania	1,610	0
18	Sweden	1,060	0
19	Bulgaria	770	0

=== Ranking facts ===
Biggest rise
Pos	Team	Ori	New	Move
1	Turkey	13	8	▲ +5
2	Czech Republic	19	15	▲ +4
3	Israel	16	13	▲ +3

Biggest fall
Pos	Team	Ori	New	Move
1	Malta	10	12	▼ –2
1	Slovakia	14	16	▼ –2
2	France	6	7	▼ –1
2	Portugal	9	10	▼ –1
2	Sweden	17	18	▼ –1
2	Bulgaria	18	19	▼ –1

New entries
Romania

Leaving entries
Russia

== Teams ==
Starting this season, only the top four teams from national leagues ranked 1–4 and the top two teams from national leagues ranked 5–6 are permitted to enter.

The Champions League and, for the first time, Euro Cup winners are granted a place in the Champions League group stage and qualification round respectively (however, both spots was not used as both clubs in question qualified via winning their domestic league).

Unlike last season, in the event that a club decides not to enter, the next best ranked team is not allowed to take their place.

=== Qualified teams ===
The labels in the parentheses show how each team qualified for the place of its starting round:

- CL: Champions League title holders
- EC: Euro Cup title holders
- 1st, 2nd, 3rd, 4th,: League positions of the previous season

Entry round	Teams			
Group stage	(Spain) Astralpool CN Sabadell (1st)	(Spain) CN Sant Andreu ^{CL} (2nd)	(Greece) NO Vouliagmeni (1st)	(Greece) Olympiacos SF Piraeus (2nd)
Group stage	(Hungary) FTC Telekom (1st)	(Hungary) UVSE Helia-D (2nd)	(Italy) Ekipe Orizzonte (1st)	(Italy) SIS Roma (2nd)
Qualification round	(Spain) CN Terrassa (3rd)	(Spain) Assolim CN Mataró (4th)	(Greece) Alimos NAS Betsson (3rd)	(Greece) ANO Glyfada iRepair (4th)
Qualification round	(Hungary) ONE Eger (3rd)	(Hungary) DFVE Vizilabda (4th)	(Italy) Rapallo Pallanuoto (3rd)	(Italy) Pallanuoto Trieste (4th)
Qualification round	(Netherlands) ZV De Zaan ^{EC} (2nd)	(France) Lille UC (1st)	(France) Grand Nancy AC (2nd)	(Germany) Spandau 04 (1st)

=== Name changes ===
The following teams' names were changed during the season.

Original name	New name	Matchday
(Greece) ANO Glyfada	(Greece) ANO Glyfada iRepair	Qualification round

== Round and draw dates ==
=== Schedule ===
Phase	Round	Draw date	Round date
Qualification round	All rounds	28 July 2025	26–28 September 2025
Group stage	Matchday 1	28 July 2025	25 October 2025
Group stage	Matchday 2	28 July 2025	8 November 2025
Group stage	Matchday 3	28 July 2025	29 November 2025
Group stage	Matchday 4	28 July 2025	13 December 2025
Group stage	Matchday 5	28 July 2025	21 February 2026
Group stage	Matchday 6	28 July 2025	21 March 2026
Quarterfinals	First leg	23 March 2026	6 May 2026
Quarterfinals	Second leg	23 March 2026	16 May 2026
Final Four	Semifinals	23 March 2026	10 June 2026
Final Four	Final	23 March 2026	12 June 2026

== Qualification round ==
The group winners and runners-up qualify for the group stage, while everyone else drops down to the Euro Cup group stage. The draw was on 28 July 2025 in Zagreb, Croatia. The seeding is based on the club rankings.

=== Group A ===
- 26–28 September 2025, Athens, Greece.

Pos	Team	Pld	W	PSW	PSL	L	GF	GA	GD	Pts	Qualification	EGER	TER	GLY
1	(Hungary) ONE Eger	2	1	1	0	0	34	25	+9	5	Group stage	—	17–15 (Note: Match ended 13–13, ONE Eger won 4–2 on penalties.)	—
2	(Spain) CN Terrassa	2	1	0	1	0	30	27	+3	4	Group stage	—	—	—
3	(Greece) ANO Glyfada iRepair (Note: The name was changed during the first and second matchday.) (H)	2	0	0	0	2	20	32	−12	0		12–13	8–19	—

Source: European Aquatics Women's Champions League
(H) Host

=== Group B ===
- 26–28 September 2025, Berlin, Germany.

Pos	Team	Pld	W	PSW	PSL	L	GF	GA	GD	Pts	Qualification	SPA	ALI	LIL
1	(Germany) Spandau 04 (H)	2	2	0	0	0	31	24	+7	6	Group stage	—	13–12	18–12
2	(Greece) Alimos NAS Betsson	2	1	0	0	1	33	24	+9	3	Group stage	—	—	21–11
3	(France) Lille UC	2	0	0	0	2	23	39	−16	0		—	—	—

Source: European Aquatics Women's Champions League
(H) Host

=== Group C ===
- 26–28 September 2025, Dunaújváros, Hungary.

Pos	Team	Pld	W	PSW	PSL	L	GF	GA	GD	Pts	Qualification	DFVE	ZAAN	NAN
1	(Hungary) DFVE Vizilabda (H)	2	2	0	0	0	42	19	+23	6	Group stage	—	15–13	27–6
2	(Netherlands) ZV De Zaan	2	1	0	0	1	39	19	+20	3	Group stage	—	—	—
3	(France) Grand Nancy AC	2	0	0	0	2	10	53	−43	0		—	4–26	—

Source: European Aquatics Women's Champions League
(H) Host

=== Group D ===
- 26–28 September 2025, Dunaújváros, Hungary.

Pos	Team	Pld	W	PSW	PSL	L	GF	GA	GD	Pts	Qualification	MAT	RAP	TRI
1	(Spain) Assolim CN Mataró	2	2	0	0	0	30	20	+10	6	Group stage	—	14–9	16–11
2	(Italy) Rapallo Pallanuoto	2	0	1	0	1	23	27	−4	2	Group stage	—	—	—
3	(Italy) Pallanuoto Trieste	2	0	0	1	1	24	30	−6	1		—	13–14 (Note: Match ended 10–10, Rapallo Pallanuoto won 4–3 on penalties.)	—

Source: European Aquatics Women's Champions League

== Group stage ==
Location of teams of the 2025–26 European Aquatics Women's Champions League group stage.
Red: Group A; Blue: Group B; Yellow: Group C; Green: Group D.

The draw took place on 28 July 2025 in Zagreb, Croatia. The top two advance to the Quarterfinals.

Teams are ranked according to points (3 points for a win, 2 points for a penalty shootout win, 1 point for a penalty shootout loss, 0 points for a loss), and if tied on points, the following tiebreaking criteria are applied, in the order given, to determine the rankings:

- Points in head-to-head matches among tied teams;
- Goal difference in head-to-head matches among tied teams;
- Goals scored in head-to-head matches among tied teams;
- Goal difference in all group matches;
- Goals scored in all group matches.

Six countries are being represented, one more than the previous edition. A German team qualified for the first time. Rapallo Pallanuoto, Spandau 04 and ZV De Zaan will make their debut. Hungary and Spain boast the most clubs with four.

Location of Catalonia teams of the 2025–26 European Aquatics Women's Champions League group stage.
Red: Group A; Blue: Group B;
Yellow: Group C; Green: Group D.

=== Group A ===
Pos	Team	Pld	W	PSW	PSL	L	GF	GA	GD	Pts	Qualification	OLY	UVSE	DFVE	ALI
1	(Greece) Olympiacos Piraeus	6	5	0	0	1	96	50	+46	15	Advance to Quarterfinals	—	9–6	16–8	20–9
2	(Hungary) UVSE Helia-D	6	4	0	0	2	75	61	+14	12	Advance to Quarterfinals	16–15	—	17–11	12–11
3	(Hungary) DFVE Vizilabda	6	3	0	0	3	66	85	−19	9		3–19	11–10	—	19–14
4	(Greece) Alimos NAS Betsson	6	0	0	0	6	55	96	−41	0		8–17	4–14	9–14	—

Source: European Aquatics Women's Champions League

=== Group B ===
Pos	Team	Pld	W	PSW	PSL	L	GF	GA	GD	Pts	Qualification	MAT	SAB	ORI	TER
1	(Spain) Assolim CN Mataró	6	6	0	0	0	75	51	+24	18	Advance to Quarterfinals	—	14–9	13–8	13–8
2	(Spain) Astralpool CN Sabadell	6	2	1	0	3	57	62	−5	8	Advance to Quarterfinals	7–12	—	11–8	13–9
3	(Italy) Ekipe Orizzonte	6	2	0	1	3	65	65	0	7		11–12	12–14	—	13–9
4	(Spain) CN Terrassa	6	1	0	0	5	53	72	−19	3		8–11	9–7	10–15	—

Source: European Aquatics Women's Champions League

=== Group C ===
Pos	Team	Pld	W	PSW	PSL	L	GF	GA	GD	Pts	Qualification	FTC	VOU	RAP	SPA
1	(Hungary) FTC Telekom	6	5	0	1	0	100	66	+34	16	Advance to Quarterfinals	—	18–19 (Note: Match ended 11–11, NO Vouliagmeni won 8–7 on penalties.)	16–13	22–12
2	(Greece) NO Vouliagmeni	6	4	1	0	1	93	60	+33	14	Advance to Quarterfinals	8–13	—	19–13	18–7
3	(Italy) Rapallo Pallanuoto	6	2	0	0	4	87	87	0	6		14–17	10–18	—	17–8
4	(Germany) Spandau 04	6	0	0	0	6	50	117	−67	0		8–21	6–19	9–20	—

Source: European Aquatics Women's Champions League

=== Group D ===
Pos	Team	Pld	W	PSW	PSL	L	GF	GA	GD	Pts	Qualification	AND	ROM	ZAAN	EGER
1	(Spain) CN Sant Andreu	6	6	0	0	0	88	56	+32	18	Advance to Quarterfinals	—	13–10	13–9	19–8
2	(Italy) SIS Roma	6	3	0	0	3	76	75	+1	9	Advance to Quarterfinals	15–16	—	12–10	11–13
3	(Netherlands) ZV De Zaan	6	2	0	0	4	68	78	−10	6		7–14	13–15	—	12–11
4	(Hungary) ONE Eger	6	1	0	0	5	62	85	−23	3		7–13	10–13	13–17	—

Source: European Aquatics Women's Champions League

== Quarterfinals ==
=== Draw ===
The draw took place in Zagreb on 23 March 2025. The seeded and unseeded clubs consist of the teams that finished first and second in the previous round respectively. The only restriction was that clubs from the same group in the group stage could not be drawn against each other.

Seeded	Unseeded
(Greece) Olympiacos SF Piraeus (Spain) Assolim CN Mataró (Hungary) FTC Telekom (Spain) CN Sant Andreu	(Hungary) UVSE Helia-D (Spain) Astralpool CN Sabadell (Greece) NO Vouliagmeni (Italy) SIS Roma

=== Bracket ===
Team 1	Agg.	Team 2	1st leg	2nd leg
Astralpool CN Sabadell (Spain)	20–27	(Greece) Olympiacos Piraeus	12–17	8–10
Assolim CN Mataró (Spain)	25–19	(Italy) SIS Roma	13–9	12–10
FTC Telekom (Hungary)	34–25	(Hungary) UVSE Helia-D	16–9	18–16
CN Sant Andreu (Spain)	26–25	(Greece) NO Vouliagmeni	11–11	15–14 (Note: Match finished 11–11. CN Sant Andreu won 4–3 on penalties.)

== Final Four ==
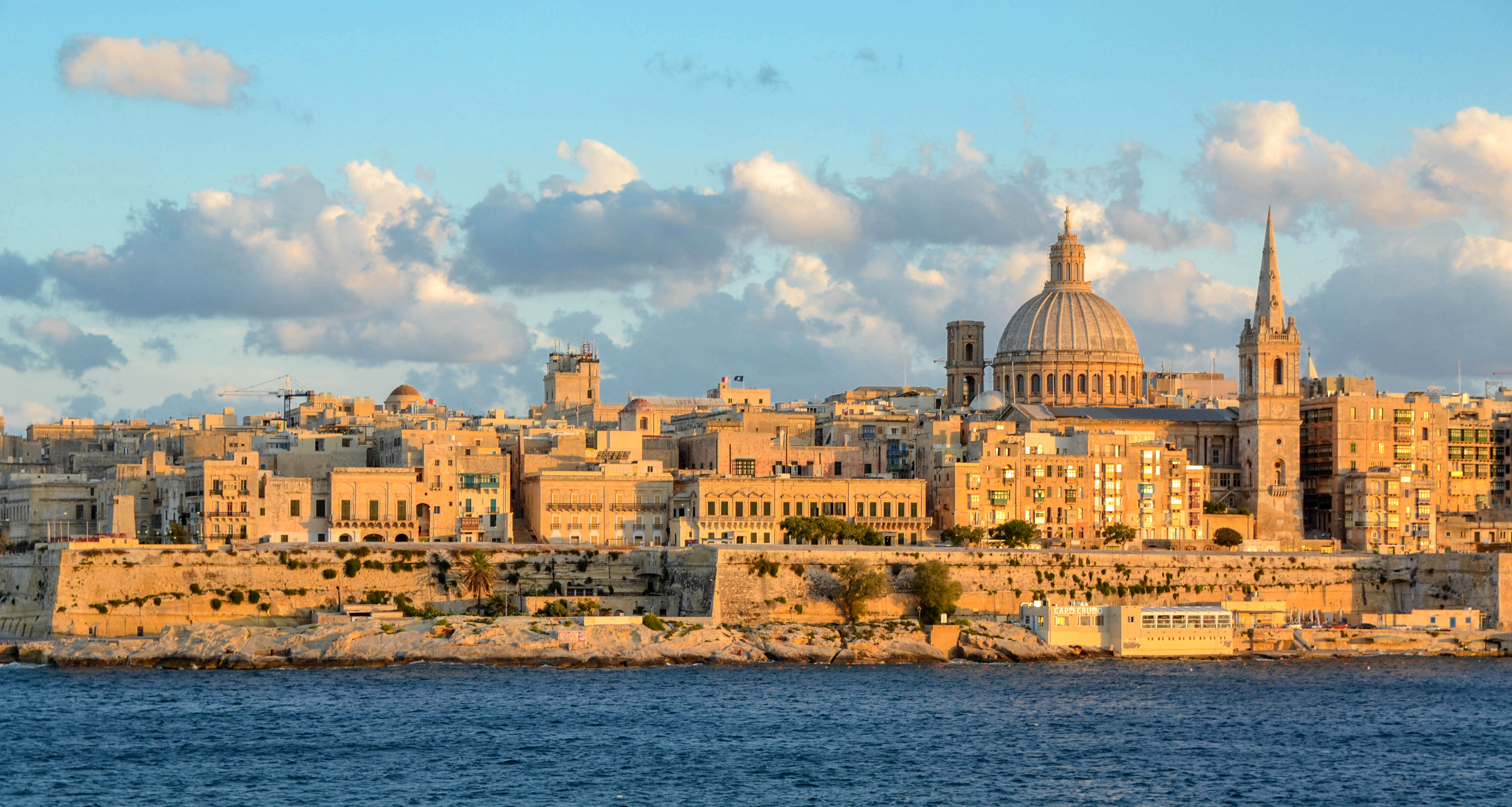
The National Pool Complex in Valletta will host the Final Four.

On 17 November 2025, European Aquatics announced that Valletta, Malta, will host the women's Final Four in conjunction with the men's one. The tournament was held on the 10–12 June 2025 at the National Pool Complex in Valletta, Malta.

=== Bracket ===
Semi-finals
(Spain) Assolim CN Mataró	12
(Greece) Olympiacos Piraeus	14
(Hungary) FTC Telekom	15
(Spain) CN Sant Andreu	14

Final
(Greece) Olympiacos Piraeus	17
(Hungary) FTC Telekom	14
Third place
(Spain) Assolim CN Mataró	9
(Spain) CN Sant Andreu	11

=== Third place match ===
12 June 2026; 19:00	Report	Assolim CN Mataró (Spain)	9–11	(Spain) CN Sant Andreu	National Pool Complex, Msida; Referees: Marieke van den Berg (NED), Ivanka Rakovic (SRB)
12 June 2026; 19:00	Report	Score by quarters: 2–2, 2–4, 3–3, 2–2			National Pool Complex, Msida; Referees: Marieke van den Berg (NED), Ivanka Rakovic (SRB)
12 June 2026; 19:00	Report	Roemer 4	Goals	Jutte 3	National Pool Complex, Msida; Referees: Marieke van den Berg (NED), Ivanka Rakovic (SRB)

=== Final ===
12 June 2026; 21:00	Report	Olympiacos Piraeus (Greece)	17–14 (PSO)	FTC Telekom	National Pool Complex, Msida; Referees: Alessia Ferrari (ITA), Maxim Gerasimov (GBR)
12 June 2026; 21:00	Report	Score by quarters: 4–3, 3–2, 3–6, 4–3 PSO: 3–0			National Pool Complex, Msida; Referees: Alessia Ferrari (ITA), Maxim Gerasimov (GBR)
12 June 2026; 21:00	Report	Andrews 5	Goals	Gurisatti 7	National Pool Complex, Msida; Referees: Alessia Ferrari (ITA), Maxim Gerasimov (GBR)

2025–26 European Aquatics Women's Champions League Champions

Olympiacos SF Piraeus
Fourth title

== See also ==
- 2025–26 European Aquatics Champions League
- 2025–26 European Aquatics Euro Cup
- 2025–26 European Aquatics Conference Cup
- 2025–26 European Aquatics Challenger Cup
- 2025 European Aquatics Super Cup
- 2025–26 European Aquatics Women's Euro Cup
- 2025–26 European Aquatics Women's Conference Cup
- 2025–26 European Aquatics Women's Challenger Cup
- 2025 European Aquatics Women's Super Cup
