= 2025–26 European Aquatics Women's Champions League group stage =

Tournament information
- Sport: Water polo
- Date: 25 October 2025 – 21 March 2026
- Tournament format: Round-robin
- Teams: 16
- Website: Official website

Tournament statistics
- Matches played: 48

The 2025–26 European Aquatics Women's Champions League group stage is played between 25 October 2025 and 21 March 2026 to determine the eight teams advancing to the Quarterfinals of the 2025–26 European Aquatics Women's Champions League.

== Format ==
The 16 teams were place into four groups of four. In each group, teams will play against each other home-and-away in a round-robin format. The top two teams in each group advanced to the Quarterfinals.

Teams are ranked according to points (3 points for a win, 2 points for a penalty shootout win, 1 point for a penalty shootout loss, 0 points for a loss), and if tied on points, the following tiebreaking criteria are applied, in the order given, to determine the rankings:

- Points in head-to-head matches among tied teams;
- Goal difference in head-to-head matches among tied teams;
- Goals scored in head-to-head matches among tied teams;
- Goal difference in all group matches;
- Goals scored in all group matches.

== Draw ==
External videos
- 2025–26 European Aquatics Women's Champions League group stage – Draw
- Draw

The draw was on 28 July 2025 in Zagreb, Croatia. The seeding is based on the club rankings. The draw started with, in order, pots 1, 2, 3 and 4 being drawn. The position for the team within the group would then be drawn (for the purpose of the schedule). The only restriction was that clubs from the same group in the qualification round could not be drawn against each other.

Key to colours
Teams advancing to the Quarterfinals

Pot 1
| Team | Rank | Points |
|---|---|---|
| (Spain) Astralpool CN Sabadell | 1 | 42,750 |
| (Greece) Olympiacos SF Piraeus | 2 | 38,070 |
| (Spain) CN Sant Andreu | 4 | 27,150 |
| (Greece) NO Vouliagmeni | 5 | 26,125 |

Pot 2
| Team | Rank | Points |
|---|---|---|
| (Italy) Ekipe Orizzonte | 6 | 24,985 |
| (Hungary) FTC Telekom | 7 | 23,380 |
| (Hungary) UVSE Helia-D | 8 | 22,127.5 |
| (Italy) SIS Roma | 15 | 16,005 |

Pot 3
| Team | Rank | Points |
|---|---|---|
| (Hungary) ONE Eger (Note: Team not known at the time of the draw. Was the Group A winner in qualification.) | 21 | 10,177.5 |
| (Germany) Spandau 04 (Note: Team not known at the time of the draw. Was the Group B winner in qualification.) | 22 | 9,350 |
| (Hungary) DFVE Vizilabda (Note: Team not known at the time of the draw. Was the Group C winner in qualification.) | 13 | 19,532.5 |
| (Spain) Assolim CN Mataró (Note: Team not known at the time of the draw. Was the Group D winner in qualification.) | 3 | 31,510 |

Pot 4
| Team | Rank | Points |
|---|---|---|
| (Spain) CN Terrassa (Note: Team not known at the time of the draw. Was the Group A runners-up in qualification.) | 11 | 20,520 |
| (Greece) Alimos NAS Betsson (Note: Team not known at the time of the draw. Was the Group B runners-up in qualification.) | 12 | 19,680 |
| (Netherlands) ZV De Zaan (Note: Team not known at the time of the draw. Was the Group C runners-up in qualification.) | 16 | 15,190 |
| (Italy) Rapallo Pallanuoto (Note: Team not known at the time of the draw. Was the Group D runners-up in qualification.) | 36 | 3,230 |

=== Draw results ===
Group A
| Pos | Team |
|---|---|
| A1 | (Greece) Alimos NAS Betsson |
| A2 | (Hungary) UVSE Helia-D |
| A3 | (Greece) Olympiacos Piraeus |
| A4 | (Hungary) DFVE Vizilabda |

Group B
| Pos | Team |
|---|---|
| B1 | (Italy) Ekipe Orizzonte |
| B2 | (Spain) CN Terrassa |
| B3 | (Spain) Astralpool CN Sabadell |
| B4 | (Spain) Assolim CN Mataró |

Group C
| Pos | Team |
|---|---|
| C1 | (Germany) Spandau 04 |
| C2 | (Hungary) FTC Telekom |
| C3 | (Italy) Rapallo Pallanuoto |
| C4 | (Greece) NO Vouliagmeni |

Group D
| Pos | Team |
|---|---|
| D1 | (Spain) CN Sant Andreu |
| D2 | (Italy) SIS Roma |
| D3 | (Hungary) ONE Eger |
| D4 | (Netherlands) ZV De Zaan |

== Groups ==
=== Group A ===
| Pos | Team | Pld | W | PSW | PSL | L | GF | GA | GD | Pts | Qualification | OLY | UVSE | DFVE | ALI |
|---|---|---|---|---|---|---|---|---|---|---|---|---|---|---|---|
| 1 | (Greece) Olympiacos Piraeus | 6 | 5 | 0 | 0 | 1 | 96 | 50 | +46 | 15 | Advance to Quarterfinals | — | 9–6 | 16–8 | 20–9 |
| 2 | (Hungary) UVSE Helia-D | 6 | 4 | 0 | 0 | 2 | 75 | 61 | +14 | 12 | Advance to Quarterfinals | 16–15 | — | 17–11 | 12–11 |
| 3 | (Hungary) DFVE Vizilabda | 6 | 3 | 0 | 0 | 3 | 66 | 85 | −19 | 9 | | 3–19 | 11–10 | — | 19–14 |
| 4 | (Greece) Alimos NAS Betsson | 6 | 0 | 0 | 0 | 6 | 55 | 96 | −41 | 0 | | 8–17 | 4–14 | 9–14 | — |

Source: European Aquatics Women's Champions League

| 25 October 2025; 18:00 | Report | Alimos NAS Betsson (Greece) | 8–17 | (Greece) Olympiacos Piraeus | Papastrateio "Petros Kapagerof" Pool, Piraeus; Referees: Giuliana Nicolsi (ITA), Juan Carlos Ezponda Colominas (ESP) |
| 25 October 2025; 18:00 | Report | Score by quarters: 2–4, 3–5, 2–4, 1–4 | | | Papastrateio "Petros Kapagerof" Pool, Piraeus; Referees: Giuliana Nicolsi (ITA), Juan Carlos Ezponda Colominas (ESP) |
| 25 October 2025; 18:00 | Report | Bitsakou 3 | Goals | Ninou 4 | Papastrateio "Petros Kapagerof" Pool, Piraeus; Referees: Giuliana Nicolsi (ITA), Juan Carlos Ezponda Colominas (ESP) |

| 25 October 2025; 18:00 | Report | UVSE Helia-D (Hungary) | 17–11 | (Hungary) DFVE Vizilabda | Alfréd Hajós National Swimming Stadium, Budapest; Referees: Alessia Ferrari (ITA), Maxim Gerasimov (GBR) |
| 25 October 2025; 18:00 | Report | Score by quarters: 5–1, 3–3, 5–4, 4–3 | | | Alfréd Hajós National Swimming Stadium, Budapest; Referees: Alessia Ferrari (ITA), Maxim Gerasimov (GBR) |
| 25 October 2025; 18:00 | Report | Faragó 4 | Goals | Katsimpri 4 | Alfréd Hajós National Swimming Stadium, Budapest; Referees: Alessia Ferrari (ITA), Maxim Gerasimov (GBR) |

| 7 November 2025; 19:00 | Report | DFVE Vizilabda (Hungary) | 19–14 | (Greece) Alimos NAS Betsson | Éva Fabó Sports Swimming Pool, Dunaújváros; Referees: Ante Bura (CRO), Sergio Turnes Jimenez (ESP) |
| 7 November 2025; 19:00 | Report | Score by quarters: 6–2, 6–7, 3–4, 4–1 | | | Éva Fabó Sports Swimming Pool, Dunaújváros; Referees: Ante Bura (CRO), Sergio Turnes Jimenez (ESP) |
| 7 November 2025; 19:00 | Report | Garda 6 | Goals | Bitsakou 3 | Éva Fabó Sports Swimming Pool, Dunaújváros; Referees: Ante Bura (CRO), Sergio Turnes Jimenez (ESP) |

| 8 November 2025; 18:00 | Report | Olympiacos Piraeus (Greece) | 9–6 | (Hungary) UVSE Helia-D | Papastrateio "Petros Kapagerof" Pool, Piraeus; Referees: Roberta Grillo (ITA), Diana Dutilh Dumas (NED) |
| 8 November 2025; 18:00 | Report | Score by quarters: 2–3, 2–1, 1–1, 4–1 | | | Papastrateio "Petros Kapagerof" Pool, Piraeus; Referees: Roberta Grillo (ITA), Diana Dutilh Dumas (NED) |
| 8 November 2025; 18:00 | Report | Andrews, V. Plevritou 3 | Goals | Tiba 2 | Papastrateio "Petros Kapagerof" Pool, Piraeus; Referees: Roberta Grillo (ITA), Diana Dutilh Dumas (NED) |

| 29 November 2025; 16:30 | Report | Alimos NAS Betsson (Greece) | 4–14 | (Hungary) UVSE Helia-D | Papastrateio "Petros Kapagerof" Pool, Piraeus; Referees: Giuliana Nicolsi (ITA), Maxim Gerasimov (GBR) |
| 29 November 2025; 16:30 | Report | Score by quarters: 3–2, 0–4, 0–4, 1–4 | | | Papastrateio "Petros Kapagerof" Pool, Piraeus; Referees: Giuliana Nicolsi (ITA), Maxim Gerasimov (GBR) |
| 29 November 2025; 16:30 | Report | Bitsakou 2 | Goals | Eszter 4 | Papastrateio "Petros Kapagerof" Pool, Piraeus; Referees: Giuliana Nicolsi (ITA), Maxim Gerasimov (GBR) |

| 29 November 2025; 18:30 | Report | Olympiacos Piraeus (Greece) | 16–8 | (Hungary) DFVE Vizilabda | Papastrateio "Petros Kapagerof" Pool, Piraeus; Referees: Alessia Ferrari (ITA), Marina Martos Fernandez (ESP) |
| 29 November 2025; 18:30 | Report | Score by quarters: 5–4, 4–1, 5–3, 2–0 | | | Papastrateio "Petros Kapagerof" Pool, Piraeus; Referees: Alessia Ferrari (ITA), Marina Martos Fernandez (ESP) |
| 29 November 2025; 18:30 | Report | Andrews 6 | Goals | Garda 3 | Papastrateio "Petros Kapagerof" Pool, Piraeus; Referees: Alessia Ferrari (ITA), Marina Martos Fernandez (ESP) |

| 13 December 2025; 17:00 | Report | DFVE Vizilabda (Hungary) | 11–10 | (Hungary) UVSE Helia-D | Éva Fabó Sports Swimming Pool, Dunaújváros; Referees: Jakov Blaskovic (CRO), Bogdan Beljin (SRB) |
| 13 December 2025; 17:00 | Report | Score by quarters: 4–5, 2–0, 2–3, 3–2 | | | Éva Fabó Sports Swimming Pool, Dunaújváros; Referees: Jakov Blaskovic (CRO), Bogdan Beljin (SRB) |
| 13 December 2025; 17:00 | Report | Borsai, Szabó 3 | Goals | Faragó 4 | Éva Fabó Sports Swimming Pool, Dunaújváros; Referees: Jakov Blaskovic (CRO), Bogdan Beljin (SRB) |

| 13 December 2025; 19:00 | Report | Olympiacos Piraeus (Greece) | 20–9 | (Greece) Alimos NAS Betsson | Papastrateio "Petros Kapagerof" Pool, Piraeus; Referees: Marta Pegado Cabanas (ESP), Diana Dutilh Dumas (NED) |
| 13 December 2025; 19:00 | Report | Score by quarters: 5–1, 4–3, 7–2, 4–3 | | | Papastrateio "Petros Kapagerof" Pool, Piraeus; Referees: Marta Pegado Cabanas (ESP), Diana Dutilh Dumas (NED) |
| 13 December 2025; 19:00 | Report | Andrews 4 | Goals | Bitsakou 3 | Papastrateio "Petros Kapagerof" Pool, Piraeus; Referees: Marta Pegado Cabanas (ESP), Diana Dutilh Dumas (NED) |

| 21 February 2026; 15:30 | Report | UVSE Helia-D (Hungary) | 16–15 | (Greece) Olympiacos Piraeus | Alfréd Hajós National Swimming Stadium, Budapest; Referees: Giuliana Nicolosi (ITA), Jaume Teixido Bermudez (ESP) |
| 21 February 2026; 15:30 | Report | Score by quarters: 4–3, 2–3, 5–2, 5–7 | | | Alfréd Hajós National Swimming Stadium, Budapest; Referees: Giuliana Nicolosi (ITA), Jaume Teixido Bermudez (ESP) |
| 21 February 2026; 15:30 | Report | Tiba 4 | Goals | Tricha 6 | Alfréd Hajós National Swimming Stadium, Budapest; Referees: Giuliana Nicolosi (ITA), Jaume Teixido Bermudez (ESP) |

| 21 February 2026; 20:00 | Report | Alimos NAS Betsson (Greece) | 9–14 | (Hungary) DFVE Vizilabda | Papastrateio "Petros Kapagerof" Pool, Piraeus; Referees: Roberta Grillo (ITA), Mark Hendriks (NED) |
| 21 February 2026; 20:00 | Report | Score by quarters: 2–4, 2–0, 4–7, 1–3 | | | Papastrateio "Petros Kapagerof" Pool, Piraeus; Referees: Roberta Grillo (ITA), Mark Hendriks (NED) |
| 21 February 2026; 20:00 | Report | Chaldaiou 3 | Goals | Garda 5 | Papastrateio "Petros Kapagerof" Pool, Piraeus; Referees: Roberta Grillo (ITA), Mark Hendriks (NED) |

| 21 March 2026; 19:00 | Report | UVSE Helia-D (Hungary) | 12–11 | (Greece) Alimos NAS Betsson | Alfréd Hajós National Swimming Stadium, Budapest; Referees: Bregje de Jong (NED), Arnaldo Petronilli (ITA) |
| 21 March 2026; 19:00 | Report | Score by quarters: 2–3, 4–2, 4–4, 2–2 | | | Alfréd Hajós National Swimming Stadium, Budapest; Referees: Bregje de Jong (NED), Arnaldo Petronilli (ITA) |
| 21 March 2026; 19:00 | Report | Hajdú 6 | Goals | Van der Weijden 5 | Alfréd Hajós National Swimming Stadium, Budapest; Referees: Bregje de Jong (NED), Arnaldo Petronilli (ITA) |

| 21 March 2026; 17:00 | Report | DFVE Vizilabda (Hungary) | 3–19 | (Greece) Olympiacos Piraeus | Éva Fabó Sports Swimming Pool, Dunaújváros; Referees: Giuliana Nicolosi (ITA), Alex Marquez Mas (ESP) |
| 21 March 2026; 17:00 | Report | Score by quarters: 0–5, 2–5, 1–4, 0–5 | | | Éva Fabó Sports Swimming Pool, Dunaújváros; Referees: Giuliana Nicolosi (ITA), Alex Marquez Mas (ESP) |
| 21 March 2026; 17:00 | Report | Borsi | Goals | Tricha 6 | Éva Fabó Sports Swimming Pool, Dunaújváros; Referees: Giuliana Nicolosi (ITA), Alex Marquez Mas (ESP) |

=== Group B ===
| Pos | Team | Pld | W | PSW | PSL | L | GF | GA | GD | Pts | Qualification | MAT | SAB | ORI | TER |
|---|---|---|---|---|---|---|---|---|---|---|---|---|---|---|---|
| 1 | (Spain) Assolim CN Mataró | 6 | 6 | 0 | 0 | 0 | 75 | 51 | +24 | 18 | Advance to Quarterfinals | — | 14–9 | 13–8 | 13–8 |
| 2 | (Spain) Astralpool CN Sabadell | 6 | 2 | 1 | 0 | 3 | 57 | 62 | −5 | 8 | Advance to Quarterfinals | 7–12 | — | 11–8 | 13–9 |
| 3 | (Italy) Ekipe Orizzonte | 6 | 2 | 0 | 1 | 3 | 65 | 65 | 0 | 7 | | 11–12 | 12–14 | — | 13–9 |
| 4 | (Spain) CN Terrassa | 6 | 1 | 0 | 0 | 5 | 53 | 72 | −19 | 3 | | 8–11 | 9–7 | 10–15 | — |

Source: European Aquatics Women's Champions League

| 25 October 2025; 17:00 | Report | Ekipe Orizzonte (Italy) | 12–14 (PSO) | (Spain) Astralpool CN Sabadell | Piscina di Nesima, Catania; Referees: Nora Debreceni (HUN), Natalia Markopoulou (GRE) |
| 25 October 2025; 17:00 | Report | Score by quarters: 1–4, 2–2, 4–1, 3–3 PSO: 2–4 | | | Piscina di Nesima, Catania; Referees: Nora Debreceni (HUN), Natalia Markopoulou (GRE) |
| 25 October 2025; 17:00 | Report | Jackovich 3 | Goals | Piralkova, Van de Kraats 3 | Piscina di Nesima, Catania; Referees: Nora Debreceni (HUN), Natalia Markopoulou (GRE) |

| 25 October 2025; 18:00 | Report | CN Terrassa (Spain) | 8–11 | (Spain) Assolim CN Mataró | Àrea Olímpica, Terrassa; Referees: Nikolett Sajben (HUN), Sander Gransjean (NED) |
| 25 October 2025; 18:00 | Report | Score by quarters: 1–2, 3–1, 2–4, 2–4 | | | Àrea Olímpica, Terrassa; Referees: Nikolett Sajben (HUN), Sander Gransjean (NED) |
| 25 October 2025; 18:00 | Report | Szegedi, Ten Broek 2 | Goals | Claveria Murillo 4 | Àrea Olímpica, Terrassa; Referees: Nikolett Sajben (HUN), Sander Gransjean (NED) |

| 8 November 2025; 18:00 | Report | Assolim CN Mataró (Spain) | 13–8 | (Italy) Ekipe Orizzonte | Municipal Sports Complex, Mataró; Referees: Soma Kovacs (HUN), Michail Birakis (GRE) |
| 8 November 2025; 18:00 | Report | Score by quarters: 4–1, 2–2, 2–3, 5–2 | | | Municipal Sports Complex, Mataró; Referees: Soma Kovacs (HUN), Michail Birakis (GRE) |
| 8 November 2025; 18:00 | Report | Espar 4 | Goals | Bettini 3 | Municipal Sports Complex, Mataró; Referees: Soma Kovacs (HUN), Michail Birakis (GRE) |

| 8 November 2025; 12:00 | Report | Astralpool CN Sabadell (Spain) | 13–9 | (Spain) CN Terrassa | Can Llong pool, Sabadell; Referees: Martina Kunikova (SVK), Tobias Laufer (GER) |
| 8 November 2025; 12:00 | Report | Score by quarters: 4–2, 1–2, 4–3, 4–2 | | | Can Llong pool, Sabadell; Referees: Martina Kunikova (SVK), Tobias Laufer (GER) |
| 8 November 2025; 12:00 | Report | four players 4 | Goals | Prats Rodriguez 3 | Can Llong pool, Sabadell; Referees: Martina Kunikova (SVK), Tobias Laufer (GER) |

| 29 November 2025; 12:15 | Report | Astralpool CN Sabadell (Spain) | 7–12 | (Spain) Assolim CN Mataró | Can Llong pool, Sabadell; Referees: Nora Debreceni (HUN), Ivanka Krstonosic Rakovic (SRB) |
| 29 November 2025; 12:15 | Report | Score by quarters: 3–1, 2–5, 1–4, 1–2 | | | Can Llong pool, Sabadell; Referees: Nora Debreceni (HUN), Ivanka Krstonosic Rakovic (SRB) |
| 29 November 2025; 12:15 | Report | Giannopoulou 2 | Goals | Kearns, Roemer 4 | Can Llong pool, Sabadell; Referees: Nora Debreceni (HUN), Ivanka Krstonosic Rakovic (SRB) |

| 29 November 2025; 17:00 | Report | Ekipe Orizzonte (Italy) | 13–9 | (Spain) CN Terrassa | Piscina di Nesima, Catania; Referees: Natalia Markopoulou (GRE), Nikolett Sajben (HUN) |
| 29 November 2025; 17:00 | Report | Score by quarters: 5–1, 3–2, 1–2, 4–4 | | | Piscina di Nesima, Catania; Referees: Natalia Markopoulou (GRE), Nikolett Sajben (HUN) |
| 29 November 2025; 17:00 | Report | Marletta 3 | Goals | Szegedi 4 | Piscina di Nesima, Catania; Referees: Natalia Markopoulou (GRE), Nikolett Sajben (HUN) |

| 13 December 2025; 12:00 | Report | Astralpool CN Sabadell (Spain) | 11–8 | (Italy) Ekipe Orizzonte | Can Llong pool, Sabadell; Referees: Aurely Bouchard (FRA), Marieke van den Berg (NED) |
| 13 December 2025; 12:00 | Report | Score by quarters: 4–1, 4–1, 1–3, 2–3 | | | Can Llong pool, Sabadell; Referees: Aurely Bouchard (FRA), Marieke van den Berg (NED) |
| 13 December 2025; 12:00 | Report | González 4 | Goals | Cassara 6 | Can Llong pool, Sabadell; Referees: Aurely Bouchard (FRA), Marieke van den Berg (NED) |

| 13 December 2025; 13:00 | Report | Assolim CN Mataró (Spain) | 13–8 | (Spain) CN Terrassa | Municipal Sports Complex, Mataró; Referees: Nora Debreceni (HUN), Theodora Michailidou (GRE) |
| 13 December 2025; 13:00 | Report | Score by quarters: 3–3, 3–2, 5–2, 2–1 | | | Municipal Sports Complex, Mataró; Referees: Nora Debreceni (HUN), Theodora Michailidou (GRE) |
| 13 December 2025; 13:00 | Report | Kearns 4 | Goals | Prats Rodriguez 3 | Municipal Sports Complex, Mataró; Referees: Nora Debreceni (HUN), Theodora Michailidou (GRE) |

| 21 February 2026; 17:00 | Report | Ekipe Orizzonte (Italy) | 11–12 | (Spain) Assolim CN Mataró | Piscina di Nesima, Catania; Referees: Nikolaos Boudramis (GRE), Koppany Toth (HUN) |
| 21 February 2026; 17:00 | Report | Score by quarters: 3–4, 2–3, 5–3, 1–2 | | | Piscina di Nesima, Catania; Referees: Nikolaos Boudramis (GRE), Koppany Toth (HUN) |
| 21 February 2026; 17:00 | Report | Halligan 5 | Goals | Claveria Murillo 5 | Piscina di Nesima, Catania; Referees: Nikolaos Boudramis (GRE), Koppany Toth (HUN) |

| 21 February 2026; 18:00 | Report | CN Terrassa (Spain) | 9–7 | (Spain) Astralpool CN Sabadell | Àrea Olímpica, Terrassa; Referees: Natalia Markopoulou (GRE), Ralf Mueller (GER) |
| 21 February 2026; 18:00 | Report | Score by quarters: 2–1, 1–3, 3–2, 3–1 | | | Àrea Olímpica, Terrassa; Referees: Natalia Markopoulou (GRE), Ralf Mueller (GER) |
| 21 February 2026; 18:00 | Report | Casado, Peña 2 | Goals | González, Van de Kraats 2 | Àrea Olímpica, Terrassa; Referees: Natalia Markopoulou (GRE), Ralf Mueller (GER) |

| 21 March 2026; 18:00 | Report | CN Terrassa (Spain) | 10–15 | (Italy) Ekipe Orizzonte | Àrea Olímpica, Terrassa; Referees: Nora Debreceni (HUN), Martina Kunikova (SVK) |
| 21 March 2026; 18:00 | Report | Score by quarters: 3–5, 2–1, 3–5, 2–4 | | | Àrea Olímpica, Terrassa; Referees: Nora Debreceni (HUN), Martina Kunikova (SVK) |
| 21 March 2026; 18:00 | Report | Prats Rodriguez 3 | Goals | Halligan, Cassara 3 | Àrea Olímpica, Terrassa; Referees: Nora Debreceni (HUN), Martina Kunikova (SVK) |

| 21 March 2026; 16:00 | Report | Assolim CN Mataró (Spain) | 14–9 | (Spain) Astralpool CN Sabadell | Municipal Sports Complex, Mataró; Referees: Maria Daskalopoulou (GRE), Ruben Garcia (SUI) |
| 21 March 2026; 16:00 | Report | Score by quarters: 4–2, 4–2, 3–3, 3–2 | | | Municipal Sports Complex, Mataró; Referees: Maria Daskalopoulou (GRE), Ruben Garcia (SUI) |
| 21 March 2026; 16:00 | Report | Roemer, Avegno 4 | Goals | Crespi, González | Municipal Sports Complex, Mataró; Referees: Maria Daskalopoulou (GRE), Ruben Garcia (SUI) |

=== Group C ===
| Pos | Team | Pld | W | PSW | PSL | L | GF | GA | GD | Pts | Qualification | FTC | VOU | RAP | SPA |
|---|---|---|---|---|---|---|---|---|---|---|---|---|---|---|---|
| 1 | (Hungary) FTC Telekom | 6 | 5 | 0 | 1 | 0 | 100 | 66 | +34 | 16 | Advance to Quarterfinals | — | 18–19 (Note: Match ended 11–11, NO Vouliagmeni won 8–7 on penalties.) | 16–13 | 22–12 |
| 2 | (Greece) NO Vouliagmeni | 6 | 4 | 1 | 0 | 1 | 93 | 60 | +33 | 14 | Advance to Quarterfinals | 8–13 | — | 19–13 | 18–7 |
| 3 | (Italy) Rapallo Pallanuoto | 6 | 2 | 0 | 0 | 4 | 87 | 87 | 0 | 6 | | 14–17 | 10–18 | — | 17–8 |
| 4 | (Germany) Spandau 04 | 6 | 0 | 0 | 0 | 6 | 50 | 117 | −67 | 0 | | 8–21 | 6–19 | 9–20 | — |

Source: European Aquatics Women's Champions League

| 25 October 2025; 18:00 | Report | Spandau 04 (Germany) | 9–20 | (Italy) Rapallo Pallanuoto | Schöneberg Swimming Hall, Berlin; Referees: Martina Kunikova (SVK), Lea Saftic (CRO) |
| 25 October 2025; 18:00 | Report | Score by quarters: 3–4, 2–5, 2–6, 2–5 | | | Schöneberg Swimming Hall, Berlin; Referees: Martina Kunikova (SVK), Lea Saftic (CRO) |
| 25 October 2025; 18:00 | Report | G. Deike 4 | Goals | Giustini 4 | Schöneberg Swimming Hall, Berlin; Referees: Martina Kunikova (SVK), Lea Saftic (CRO) |

| 25 October 2025; 18:00 | Report | FTC Telekom (Hungary) | 18–19 (PSO) | (Greece) NO Vouliagmeni | FTC Swimming Pool, Budapest; Referees: Marta Pegado (ESP), Bogdan Beljin (SRB) |
| 25 October 2025; 18:00 | Report | Score by quarters: 4–0, 3–4, 1–1, 3–6 PSO: 7–8 | | | FTC Swimming Pool, Budapest; Referees: Marta Pegado (ESP), Bogdan Beljin (SRB) |
| 25 October 2025; 18:00 | Report | Keszthelyi 3 | Goals | Krassa 4 | FTC Swimming Pool, Budapest; Referees: Marta Pegado (ESP), Bogdan Beljin (SRB) |

| 8 November 2025; 18:00 | Report | NO Vouliagmeni (Greece) | 18–7 | (Germany) Spandau 04 | "Cyprus" Swimming Pool, Vari; Referees: Pau Ferre Segurana (ESP), Erkan Turkkan (TUR) |
| 8 November 2025; 18:00 | Report | Score by quarters: 5–1, 6–0, 1–1, 6–5 | | | "Cyprus" Swimming Pool, Vari; Referees: Pau Ferre Segurana (ESP), Erkan Turkkan (TUR) |
| 8 November 2025; 18:00 | Report | four players 3 | Goals | G. Deike 4 | "Cyprus" Swimming Pool, Vari; Referees: Pau Ferre Segurana (ESP), Erkan Turkkan (TUR) |

| 8 November 2025; 18:00 | Report | Rapallo Pallanuoto (Italy) | 14–17 | (Hungary) FTC Telekom | Municipal Olympic Pool, Genoa; Referees: Aurely Bouchez (FRA), Bregje de Jong (NED) |
| 8 November 2025; 18:00 | Report | Score by quarters: 2–4, 5–6, 3–5, 4–1 | | | Municipal Olympic Pool, Genoa; Referees: Aurely Bouchez (FRA), Bregje de Jong (NED) |
| 8 November 2025; 18:00 | Report | Bakoc 5 | Goals | Keszthelyi 5 | Municipal Olympic Pool, Genoa; Referees: Aurely Bouchez (FRA), Bregje de Jong (NED) |

| 29 November 2025; 14:00 | Report | Spandau 04 (Germany) | 8–21 | (Hungary) FTC Telekom | Schöneberg Swimming Hall, Berlin; Referees: Marieke van den Berg (NED), Anne Grandin (FRA) |
| 29 November 2025; 14:00 | Report | Score by quarters: 1–6, 3–2, 2–6, 2–7 | | | Schöneberg Swimming Hall, Berlin; Referees: Marieke van den Berg (NED), Anne Grandin (FRA) |
| 29 November 2025; 14:00 | Report | G. Deike 3 | Goals | three players 3 | Schöneberg Swimming Hall, Berlin; Referees: Marieke van den Berg (NED), Anne Grandin (FRA) |

| 19 March 2026 (Note: The match originally supposed to take place on 29 November 2025 was postponed.); 15:00 | Report | Rapallo Pallanuoto (Italy) | 10–18 | (Greece) NO Vouliagmeni | Laimos Swimming Pool, Vouliagmeni; Referees: Diana Dumas (NED), Jaume Teixido (ESP) |
| 19 March 2026; 15:00 | Report | Score by quarters: 2–4, 2–4, 2–5, 4–5 | | | Laimos Swimming Pool, Vouliagmeni; Referees: Diana Dumas (NED), Jaume Teixido (ESP) |
| 19 March 2026; 15:00 | Report | Giustini 3 | Goals | Joustra | Laimos Swimming Pool, Vouliagmeni; Referees: Diana Dumas (NED), Jaume Teixido (ESP) |

| 13 December 2025; 16:00 | Report | NO Vouliagmeni (Greece) | 8–13 | (Hungary) FTC Telekom | "Cyprus" Swimming Pool, Vari; Referees: Marina Martos Fernandez (ESP), Maxim Gerasimov (GBR) |
| 13 December 2025; 16:00 | Report | Score by quarters: 2–3, 2–4, 2–4, 2–2 | | | "Cyprus" Swimming Pool, Vari; Referees: Marina Martos Fernandez (ESP), Maxim Gerasimov (GBR) |
| 13 December 2025; 16:00 | Report | Foundotou 4 | Goals | three players 3 | "Cyprus" Swimming Pool, Vari; Referees: Marina Martos Fernandez (ESP), Maxim Gerasimov (GBR) |

| 13 December 2025; 18:30 | Report | Rapallo Pallanuoto (Italy) | 17–8 | (Germany) Spandau 04 | Municipal Olympic Pool, Genoa; Referees: Massimo Angileri (MLT), Gokhan Can Ciger (TUR) |
| 13 December 2025; 18:30 | Report | Score by quarters: 6–1, 3–4, 4–2, 4–2 | | | Municipal Olympic Pool, Genoa; Referees: Massimo Angileri (MLT), Gokhan Can Ciger (TUR) |
| 13 December 2025; 18:30 | Report | Cabona, Giustini 3 | Goals | Ludwig 3 | Municipal Olympic Pool, Genoa; Referees: Massimo Angileri (MLT), Gokhan Can Ciger (TUR) |

| 21 February 2026; 16:00 | Report | FTC Telekom (Hungary) | 16–13 | (Italy) Rapallo Pallanuoto | FTC Swimming Pool, Budapest; Referees: Martina Kunikova (SVK), Vuk Milovic (SRB) |
| 21 February 2026; 16:00 | Report | Score by quarters: 4–0, 3–2, 6–5, 3–6 | | | FTC Swimming Pool, Budapest; Referees: Martina Kunikova (SVK), Vuk Milovic (SRB) |
| 21 February 2026; 16:00 | Report | Gurisatti 5 | Goals | Giustini 3 | FTC Swimming Pool, Budapest; Referees: Martina Kunikova (SVK), Vuk Milovic (SRB) |

| 21 February 2026; 18:00 | Report | Spandau 04 (Germany) | 6–19 | (Greece) NO Vouliagmeni | Schöneberg Swimming Hall, Berlin; Referees: Marieke van den Berg (NED), Massimo Angileri (MLT) |
| 21 February 2026; 18:00 | Report | Score by quarters: 0–3, 3–5, 1–5, 2–6 | | | Schöneberg Swimming Hall, Berlin; Referees: Marieke van den Berg (NED), Massimo Angileri (MLT) |
| 21 February 2026; 18:00 | Report | six players 1 | Goals | Christmas, Foundotou 4 | Schöneberg Swimming Hall, Berlin; Referees: Marieke van den Berg (NED), Massimo Angileri (MLT) |

| 21 March 2026; 15:00 | Report | NO Vouliagmeni (Greece) | 19–13 | (Italy) Rapallo Pallanuoto | Laimos Swimming Pool, Vouliagmeni; Referees: Aurely Bouchez (FRA), Maxim Gerasimov(GBR) |
| 21 March 2026; 15:00 | Report | Score by quarters: 6–4, 2–4, 3–3, 8–2 | | | Laimos Swimming Pool, Vouliagmeni; Referees: Aurely Bouchez (FRA), Maxim Gerasimov(GBR) |
| 21 March 2026; 15:00 | Report | Xenaki, Moolhuijzen 5 | Goals | Galardi 4 | Laimos Swimming Pool, Vouliagmeni; Referees: Aurely Bouchez (FRA), Maxim Gerasimov(GBR) |

| 21 March 2026; 12:00 | Report | FTC Telekom (Hungary) | 22–12 | (Germany) Spandau 04 | FTC Swimming Pool, Budapest; Referees: Marina Fernández (ESP), Eurico Silva (POR) |
| 21 March 2026; 12:00 | Report | Score by quarters: 5–2, 5–3, 9–2, 3–5 | | | FTC Swimming Pool, Budapest; Referees: Marina Fernández (ESP), Eurico Silva (POR) |
| 21 March 2026; 12:00 | Report | Gurisatti 5 | Goals | I. Deike 3 | FTC Swimming Pool, Budapest; Referees: Marina Fernández (ESP), Eurico Silva (POR) |

=== Group D ===
| Pos | Team | Pld | W | PSW | PSL | L | GF | GA | GD | Pts | Qualification | AND | ROM | ZAAN | EGER |
|---|---|---|---|---|---|---|---|---|---|---|---|---|---|---|---|
| 1 | (Spain) CN Sant Andreu | 6 | 6 | 0 | 0 | 0 | 88 | 56 | +32 | 18 | Advance to Quarterfinals | — | 13–10 | 13–9 | 19–8 |
| 2 | (Italy) SIS Roma | 6 | 3 | 0 | 0 | 3 | 76 | 75 | +1 | 9 | Advance to Quarterfinals | 15–16 | — | 12–10 | 11–13 |
| 3 | (Netherlands) ZV De Zaan | 6 | 2 | 0 | 0 | 4 | 68 | 78 | −10 | 6 | | 7–14 | 13–15 | — | 12–11 |
| 4 | (Hungary) ONE Eger | 6 | 1 | 0 | 0 | 5 | 62 | 85 | −23 | 3 | | 7–13 | 10–13 | 13–17 | — |

Source: European Aquatics Women's Champions League

| 25 October 2025; 17:00 | Report | CN Sant Andreu (Spain) | 19–8 | (Hungary) ONE Eger | Nova Escullera Sport Center, Barcelona; Referees: Aurely Bouchez (FRA), Theodora Michailidou (GRE) |
| 25 October 2025; 17:00 | Report | Score by quarters: 3–2, 6–2, 5–3, 5–1 | | | Nova Escullera Sport Center, Barcelona; Referees: Aurely Bouchez (FRA), Theodora Michailidou (GRE) |
| 25 October 2025; 17:00 | Report | Ruiz 4 | Goals | Kenéz 4 | Nova Escullera Sport Center, Barcelona; Referees: Aurely Bouchez (FRA), Theodora Michailidou (GRE) |

| 25 October 2025; 18:00 | Report | SIS Roma (Italy) | 12–10 | (Netherlands) ZV De Zaan | Frecciarossa Water Polo, Rome; Referees: Sara Kontek (CRO), Massimo Angileri (MLT) |
| 25 October 2025; 18:00 | Report | Score by quarters: 3–2, 2–3, 1–2, 6–3 | | | Frecciarossa Water Polo, Rome; Referees: Sara Kontek (CRO), Massimo Angileri (MLT) |
| 25 October 2025; 18:00 | Report | Zaplatina 6 | Goals | Schuijt 3 | Frecciarossa Water Polo, Rome; Referees: Sara Kontek (CRO), Massimo Angileri (MLT) |

| 8 November 2025; 18:00 | Report | ZV De Zaan (Netherlands) | 7–14 | (Spain) CN Sant Andreu | Het Sloterparkbad, Amsterdam; Referees: Ruben Garcia (SUI), Vuk Milovic (SRB) |
| 8 November 2025; 18:00 | Report | Score by quarters: 2–5, 3–3, 2–4, 0–2 | | | Het Sloterparkbad, Amsterdam; Referees: Ruben Garcia (SUI), Vuk Milovic (SRB) |
| 8 November 2025; 18:00 | Report | L. Rogge 3 | Goals | Ruiz 4 | Het Sloterparkbad, Amsterdam; Referees: Ruben Garcia (SUI), Vuk Milovic (SRB) |

| 8 November 2025; 18:00 | Report | ONE Eger (Hungary) | 10–13 | (Italy) SIS Roma | Bitskey Aladár Swimming Pool, Eger; Referees: Natalia Markoppoulou (GRE), Ivanka Krstonosic Rakovic (SRB) |
| 8 November 2025; 18:00 | Report | Score by quarters: 4–4, 3–3, 2–5, 1–1 | | | Bitskey Aladár Swimming Pool, Eger; Referees: Natalia Markoppoulou (GRE), Ivanka Krstonosic Rakovic (SRB) |
| 8 November 2025; 18:00 | Report | Czigány 3 | Goals | Schaap 4 | Bitskey Aladár Swimming Pool, Eger; Referees: Natalia Markoppoulou (GRE), Ivanka Krstonosic Rakovic (SRB) |

| 29 November 2025; 17:00 | Report | CN Sant Andreu (Spain) | 13–10 | (Italy) SIS Roma | Nova Escullera Sport Center, Barcelona; Referees: Lea Saftic (CRO), Hendrik Schopp (GER) |
| 29 November 2025; 17:00 | Report | Score by quarters: 4–0, 3–3, 4–3, 2–4 | | | Nova Escullera Sport Center, Barcelona; Referees: Lea Saftic (CRO), Hendrik Schopp (GER) |
| 29 November 2025; 17:00 | Report | Williams 4 | Goals | three players 2 | Nova Escullera Sport Center, Barcelona; Referees: Lea Saftic (CRO), Hendrik Schopp (GER) |

| 29 November 2025; 19:30 | Report | ONE Eger (Hungary) | 13–17 | (Netherlands) ZV De Zaan | Bitskey Aladár Swimming Pool, Eger; Referees: Theodora Michailidou (GRE), Martina Kunikova (SVK) |
| 29 November 2025; 19:30 | Report | Score by quarters: 3–3, 3–5, 4–4, 3–5 | | | Bitskey Aladár Swimming Pool, Eger; Referees: Theodora Michailidou (GRE), Martina Kunikova (SVK) |
| 29 November 2025; 19:30 | Report | Czigány 6 | Goals | B. Rogge 3 | Bitskey Aladár Swimming Pool, Eger; Referees: Theodora Michailidou (GRE), Martina Kunikova (SVK) |

| 13 December 2025; 18:00 | Report | ONE Eger (Hungary) | 7–13 | (Spain) CN Sant Andreu | Bitskey Aladár Swimming Pool, Eger; Referees: Anne Grandin (FRA), Ralf Mueller (GER) |
| 13 December 2025; 18:00 | Report | Score by quarters: 1–3, 4–1, 2–3, 0–6 | | | Bitskey Aladár Swimming Pool, Eger; Referees: Anne Grandin (FRA), Ralf Mueller (GER) |
| 13 December 2025; 18:00 | Report | Czigány, Torok 2 | Goals | Ruiz 3 | Bitskey Aladár Swimming Pool, Eger; Referees: Anne Grandin (FRA), Ralf Mueller (GER) |

| 13 December 2025; 20:30 | Report | ZV De Zaan (Netherlands) | 13–15 | (Italy) SIS Roma | Het Sloterparkbad, Amsterdam; Referees: Natalia Markopoulou (GRE), Lea Saftic (CRO) |
| 13 December 2025; 20:30 | Report | Score by quarters: 2–6, 4–3, 2–2, 5–4 | | | Het Sloterparkbad, Amsterdam; Referees: Natalia Markopoulou (GRE), Lea Saftic (CRO) |
| 13 December 2025; 20:30 | Report | L. Rogge 4 | Goals | Ranalli 4 | Het Sloterparkbad, Amsterdam; Referees: Natalia Markopoulou (GRE), Lea Saftic (CRO) |

| 21 February 2026; 17:00 | Report | CN Sant Andreu (Spain) | 13–9 | (Netherlands) ZV De Zaan | Nova Escullera Sport Center, Barcelona; Referees: Aurely Bouchez (FRA), Manuel Manea (ROU) |
| 21 February 2026; 17:00 | Report | Score by quarters: 4–2, 3–1, 4–1, 2–5 | | | Nova Escullera Sport Center, Barcelona; Referees: Aurely Bouchez (FRA), Manuel Manea (ROU) |
| 21 February 2026; 17:00 | Report | Ruiz 3 | Goals | three players 2 | Nova Escullera Sport Center, Barcelona; Referees: Aurely Bouchez (FRA), Manuel Manea (ROU) |

| 21 February 2026; 21:00 | Report | SIS Roma (Italy) | 11–13 | (Hungary) ONE Eger | Frecciarossa Water Polo, Rome; Referees: Peter Radic (SVK), Ante Bura (CRO) |
| 21 February 2026; 21:00 | Report | Score by quarters: 5–2, 1–2, 2–5, 3–4 | | | Frecciarossa Water Polo, Rome; Referees: Peter Radic (SVK), Ante Bura (CRO) |
| 21 February 2026; 21:00 | Report | four players 2 | Goals | Kenéz, Parkes 4 | Frecciarossa Water Polo, Rome; Referees: Peter Radic (SVK), Ante Bura (CRO) |

| 21 March 2026; 18:00 | Report | SIS Roma (Italy) | 15–16 | (Spain) CN Sant Andreu | Frecciarossa Water Polo, Rome; Referees: Natalia Markopoulou (GRE), Gregory Courbin (FRA) |
| 21 March 2026; 18:00 | Report | Score by quarters: 4–5, 3–3, 1–6, 7–2 | | | Frecciarossa Water Polo, Rome; Referees: Natalia Markopoulou (GRE), Gregory Courbin (FRA) |
| 21 March 2026; 18:00 | Report | Zaplatina, Ranalli 4 | Goals | Ruiz 5 | Frecciarossa Water Polo, Rome; Referees: Natalia Markopoulou (GRE), Gregory Courbin (FRA) |

| 21 March 2026; 20:30 | Report | ZV De Zaan (Netherlands) | 12–11 | (Hungary) ONE Eger | Het Sloterparkbad, Amsterdam; Referees: Maro Savinovic (CRO), Gokhan Can Ciger (TUR) |
| 21 March 2026; 20:30 | Report | Score by quarters: 3–3, 2–2, 4–3, 3–3 | | | Het Sloterparkbad, Amsterdam; Referees: Maro Savinovic (CRO), Gokhan Can Ciger (TUR) |
| 21 March 2026; 20:30 | Report | Drewes 5 | Goals | Kenéz, Tomori 3 | Het Sloterparkbad, Amsterdam; Referees: Maro Savinovic (CRO), Gokhan Can Ciger (TUR) |

== See also ==
- 2025–26 European Aquatics Champions League
- 2025–26 European Aquatics Euro Cup
- 2025–26 European Aquatics Conference Cup
- 2025–26 European Aquatics Challenger Cup
- 2025 European Aquatics Super Cup
- 2025–26 European Aquatics Women's Champions League
- 2025–26 European Aquatics Women's Euro Cup
- 2025–26 European Aquatics Women's Conference Cup
- 2025–26 European Aquatics Women's Challenger Cup
- 2025 European Aquatics Women's Super Cup

Reference
Matchday 1
Matchday 2
Matchday 3
Matchday 4
Matchday 5
Matchday 6

Reference
Matchday 1
Matchday 2
Matchday 3
Matchday 4
Matchday 5
Matchday 6
