= 2025–26 European Aquatics Women's Champions League quarterfinals =

Tournament information
- Sport: Water polo
- Date: 11 April – 16 May 2026
- Teams: 8
- Website: Official website

Tournament statistics
- Matches played: 8

The 2025–26 European Aquatics Women's Champions League quarterfinals is played between 11 April and 16 May 2026 to determine the four teams advancing to the Final Four of the 2025–26 European Aquatics Women's Champions League.

== Format ==
The 8 advancing teams are split into four home and away ties to decide the teams reaching the Final Four.

== Teams ==
The group winners and runners-up qualified for the quarterfinals.

Group	Winners	Runners-up
A	(Greece) Olympiacos SF Piraeus	(Hungary) UVSE Helia-D
B	(Spain) Assolim CN Mataró	(Spain) Astralpool CN Sabadell
C	(Hungary) FTC Telekom	(Greece) NO Vouliagmeni
D	(Spain) CN Sant Andreu	(Italy) SIS Roma

== Draw ==
External videos
- 2025–26 European Aquatics Champions League quarterfinals – Draw
- Draw

The draw took place in Zagreb on 23 March 2026. The seeded and unseeded clubs consist of the teams that finished first and second in the previous round respectively. The only restriction was that clubs from the same group in the group stage could not be drawn against each other. The teams advancing are in bold.

Seeded	Unseeded
(Greece) **Olympiacos Piraeus** (Spain) **Assolim CN Mataró** (Hungary) **FTC Telekom** (Spain) **CN Sant Andreu**	(Hungary) UVSE Helia-D (Spain) Astralpool CN Sabadell (Greece) NO Vouliagmeni (Italy) SIS Roma

== Bracket ==
Team 1	Agg.	Team 2	1st leg	2nd leg
Astralpool CN Sabadell (Spain)	20–27	(Greece) **Olympiacos Piraeus**	12–17	8–10
**Assolim CN Mataró** (Spain)	25–19	(Italy) SIS Roma	13–9	12–10
**FTC Telekom** (Hungary)	34–25	(Hungary) UVSE Helia-D	16–9	18–16
**CN Sant Andreu** (Spain)	26–25	(Greece) NO Vouliagmeni	11–11	15–14 (Note: Match finished 11–11. CN Sant Andreu won 4–3 on penalties.)

=== Matches ===
11 April 2026; 12:00	Report	Astralpool CN Sabadell (Spain)	12–**17**	(Greece) **Olympiacos Piraeus**	Can Llong pool, Sabadell; Referees: Nora Debreceni (HUN), Ruben Garcia (SUI)
11 April 2026; 12:00	Report	Score by quarters: 5–**6**, 2–**5**, 1–**3**, **4**–3			Can Llong pool, Sabadell; Referees: Nora Debreceni (HUN), Ruben Garcia (SUI)
11 April 2026; 12:00	Report	Van de Kraats 3	**Goals**	Andrews 5	Can Llong pool, Sabadell; Referees: Nora Debreceni (HUN), Ruben Garcia (SUI)

16 May 2026; 19:00	Report	**Olympiacos Piraeus** (Greece)	**10**–8	(Spain) Astralpool CN Sabadell	Papastrateio "Petros Kapagerof" Pool, Piraeus; Referees: Diana Dutilh Dumas (NED), Martina Kunikova (SVK)
16 May 2026; 19:00	Report	Score by quarters: **4**–1, 2–2, 2–**4**, **2**–1			Papastrateio "Petros Kapagerof" Pool, Piraeus; Referees: Diana Dutilh Dumas (NED), Martina Kunikova (SVK)
16 May 2026; 19:00	Report	V. Plevritou 3	**Goals**	three players 2	Papastrateio "Petros Kapagerof" Pool, Piraeus; Referees: Diana Dutilh Dumas (NED), Martina Kunikova (SVK)

Olympiacos Piraeus won 27–20 on aggregate

11 April 2026; 13:00	Report	Assolim CN Mataró (Spain)	**13**–9	(Italy) **SIS Roma**	Municipal Sports Complex, Mataró; Referees: Marieke Van Den Berg (NED), Peter Radic (SVK)
11 April 2026; 13:00	Report	Score by quarters: 2–2, **5**–3, **3**–2, **3**–2			Municipal Sports Complex, Mataró; Referees: Marieke Van Den Berg (NED), Peter Radic (SVK)
11 April 2026; 13:00	Report	Jewel Roemer 4	**Goals**	three players 2	Municipal Sports Complex, Mataró; Referees: Marieke Van Den Berg (NED), Peter Radic (SVK)

16 May 2026; 20:00	Report	SIS Roma (Italy)	10–**12**	(Spain) Assolim CN Mataró	Frecciarossa Water Polo, Rome; Referees: Ante Bura (CRO), Nikolett Sajben (HUN)
16 May 2026; 20:00	Report	Score by quarters: 1–**2**, 2–2, 3–**7**, **4**–1			Frecciarossa Water Polo, Rome; Referees: Ante Bura (CRO), Nikolett Sajben (HUN)
16 May 2026; 20:00	Report	Ranalli 3	**Goals**	Claveria Murillo 3	Frecciarossa Water Polo, Rome; Referees: Ante Bura (CRO), Nikolett Sajben (HUN)

Assolim CN Mataró won 25–19 on aggregate

11 April 2026; 20:00	Report	**FTC Telekom** (Hungary)	**16**–9	(Hungary) UVSE Helia-D	FTC Swimming Pool, Budapest; Referees: Vojin Putnicovic (SRB) Luis Santos (POR)
11 April 2026; 20:00	Report	Score by quarters: **5**–3, **5**–1, **5**–0, 1–**5**			FTC Swimming Pool, Budapest; Referees: Vojin Putnicovic (SRB) Luis Santos (POR)
11 April 2026; 20:00	Report	Ortiz 4	**Goals**	Faragó 4	FTC Swimming Pool, Budapest; Referees: Vojin Putnicovic (SRB) Luis Santos (POR)

16 May 2026; 18:00	Report	UVSE Helia-D (Hungary)	16–**18**	(Hungary) FTC Telekom	Alfréd Hajós National Swimming Stadium, Budapest; Referees: Giuliana Nicolosi (ITA), Aurely Bouchez (FRA)
16 May 2026; 18:00	Report	Score by quarters: **6**–3, 3–**6**, 4–**5**, 3–**4**			Alfréd Hajós National Swimming Stadium, Budapest; Referees: Giuliana Nicolosi (ITA), Aurely Bouchez (FRA)
16 May 2026; 18:00	Report	Hajdú 5	**Goals**	Gurisatti 9	Alfréd Hajós National Swimming Stadium, Budapest; Referees: Giuliana Nicolosi (ITA), Aurely Bouchez (FRA)

FTC Telekom won 34–25 on aggregate

11 April 2026; 18:00	Report	CN Sant Andreu (Spain)	11–11	(Greece) NO Vouliagmeni	Nova Escullera Sport Center, Barcelona; Referees: Alessia Ferrari (ITA), Maro Savinivic (CRO)
11 April 2026; 18:00	Report	Score by quarters: 1–**4**, **4**–3, 3–3, **3–1**			Nova Escullera Sport Center, Barcelona; Referees: Alessia Ferrari (ITA), Maro Savinivic (CRO)
11 April 2026; 18:00	Report	Ariadna Ruiz 3	**Goals**	Moolhuijzen 3	Nova Escullera Sport Center, Barcelona; Referees: Alessia Ferrari (ITA), Maro Savinivic (CRO)

16 May 2026; 15:00	Report	NO Vouliagmeni (Greece)	14–**15** (PSO)	(Spain) CN Sant Andreu	Laimos Swimming Pool, Vouliagmeni; Referees: Ivanka Rakovic Krstonosic (SRB), Mihai Balanescu (ROU)
16 May 2026; 15:00	Report	Score by quarters: **4**–2, 3–3, 3–**4**, 1–**2** PSO: 3–**4**			Laimos Swimming Pool, Vouliagmeni; Referees: Ivanka Rakovic Krstonosic (SRB), Mihai Balanescu (ROU)
16 May 2026; 15:00	Report	Christmas, Fountotou 4	**Goals**	A. Ruiz Barril 3	Laimos Swimming Pool, Vouliagmeni; Referees: Ivanka Rakovic Krstonosic (SRB), Mihai Balanescu (ROU)

CN Sant Andreu won 26–25 on aggregate

== See also ==
- 2025–26 European Aquatics Champions League
- 2025–26 European Aquatics Euro Cup
- 2025–26 European Aquatics Conference Cup
- 2025–26 European Aquatics Challenger Cup
- 2025 European Aquatics Super Cup
- 2025–26 European Aquatics Women's Champions League
- 2025–26 European Aquatics Women's Euro Cup
- 2025–26 European Aquatics Women's Conference Cup
- 2025–26 European Aquatics Women's Challenger Cup
- 2025 European Aquatics Women's Super Cup

Reference
First leg
Second leg

Reference
First leg
Second leg
