= 2024–25 European Aquatics Women's Champions League Final Four =

Women's water polo competition

Tournament details
- Host country: Greece
- Venue: 1 (in 1 host city)
- Dates: 2–3 May
- Teams: 4

Final positions
- Champions: (Spain) CN Sant Andreu (1st title)
- Runners-up: (Spain) Astralpool Sabadell
- Third place: (Greece) Olympiacos Piraeus
- Fourth place: (Hungary) FTC Telekom

Tournament statistics
- Matches played: 4
- Goals scored: 91 (22.75 per match)
- Top scorer: (Netherlands) Simone van de Kraats (9 goals)

Awards
- Best player: (Spain) Nona Pérez

The 2024–25 European Aquatics Women's Champions League Final Four was the season-ending event to decide the champions of the 2024–25 European Aquatics Women's Champions League. The Final Four tournament was held at the Papastrateio "Petros Kapagerof" Pool in Piraeus, Greece.

The winners were CN Sant Andreu, who won their first title by triumphing over two time defending champions Astralpool Sabadell in the final.

== Host selection ==
On 7 April 2025, Olympiacos Piraeus were given the hosting rights. The tournament was held at the Papastrateio "Petros Kapagerof" Pool in Piraeus, Greece.

== Venue ==
The Final Four tournament was held at the Papastrateio "Petros Kapagerof" Pool in Piraeus, Greece.

2024–25 European Aquatics Women's Champions League Final Four is located in Greece	Piraeus
2024–25 European Aquatics Women's Champions League Final Four is located in Greece	Papastrateio "Petros Kapagerof" Pool
2024–25 European Aquatics Women's Champions League Final Four is located in Greece	Capacity: 1,000

== Teams ==
The four winners of the quarterfinals progressed to the Final Four.

Team 1	Agg.	Team 2	1st leg	2nd leg
**Olympiacos Piraeus** (Greece)	18–16	(Greece) NO Vouliagmeni	11–10	7–6
**Astralpool Sabadell** (Spain)	32–21	(Greece) Alimos NAC Betsson	19–6	13–15
**CN Sant Andreu** (Spain)	24–16	(Spain) Assolim CN Mataró	13–8	11–8
**FTC Telekom** (Hungary)	19–15 (Note: Order of legs reversed.)	(Italy) Ekipe Orizzonte	11–9	8–6

=== Qualified teams ===
Team	Qualified date	Participations (bold indicates winners)
(Greece) Olympiacos Piraeus	29 March 2025	9 (2009–10, 2010–11, **2014–15**, 2015–16, 2016–17, 2018–19, **2020–21**, **2021–22**, 2023–24)
(Spain) Astralpool Sabadell	29 March 2025	11 (**2010–11**, **2012–13**, **2013–14**, 2014–15, **2015–16**, 2016–17, 2017–18, **2018–19**, 2021–22, 2022–23, **2023–24**)
(Spain) CN Sant Andreu	29 March 2025	1 (2023–24)
(Hungary) FTC Telekom	29 March 2025	None

== Referees ==
These referees were chosen for the Final Four.

Referees
France	Aurely Blanchard
Germany	Frank Ohme
Italy	Alessia Ferrari
Israel	Matan Schwartz
Slovenia	Boris Margeta

== Bracket ==
Semi-finals
(Greece) Olympiacos Piraeus	13
**(Spain) Astralpool Sabadell**	**15**
**(Spain) CN Sant Andreu**	**10**
(Hungary) FTC Telekom	7

Final
(Spain) Astralpool Sabadell	8
**(Spain) CN Sant Andreu**	**9**
Third place
**(Greece) Olympiacos Piraeus**	**18**
(Hungary) FTC Telekom	11

=== Semi-finals ===
2 May 2025; 18:30	Report	Olympiacos Piraeus (Greece)	13–**15**	(Spain) **Astralpool Sabadell**	Papastrateio "Petros Kapagerof" Pool, Piraeus; Referees: Alessia Ferrari (ITA), Boris Margeta (SLO)
2 May 2025; 18:30	Report	Score by quarters: **5**–4, 3–3, 2–**4**, 3–**4**			Papastrateio "Petros Kapagerof" Pool, Piraeus; Referees: Alessia Ferrari (ITA), Boris Margeta (SLO)
2 May 2025; 18:30	Report	three players 3	**Goals**	van de Kraats 5	Papastrateio "Petros Kapagerof" Pool, Piraeus; Referees: Alessia Ferrari (ITA), Boris Margeta (SLO)

2 May 2025; 20:15	Report	**CN Sant Andreu** (Spain)	**10**–7	(Hungary) FTC Telekom	Papastrateio "Petros Kapagerof" Pool, Piraeus; Referees: Aurely Blanchard (FRA), Frank Ohme (GER)
2 May 2025; 20:15	Report	Score by quarters: **4**–1, 2–**3**, 1–1, **3**–2			Papastrateio "Petros Kapagerof" Pool, Piraeus; Referees: Aurely Blanchard (FRA), Frank Ohme (GER)
2 May 2025; 20:15	Report	Anton 4	**Goals**	three players 2	Papastrateio "Petros Kapagerof" Pool, Piraeus; Referees: Aurely Blanchard (FRA), Frank Ohme (GER)

=== Third place match ===
3 May 2025; 16:00	Report	**Olympiacos Piraeus** (Greece)	**18**–11	(Hungary) FTC Telekom	Papastrateio "Petros Kapagerof" Pool, Piraeus; Referees: Alessia Ferrari (ITA), Matan Schwartz (ISR)
3 May 2025; 16:00	Report	Score by quarters: **4**–2, **4**–2, **7**–2, 3–**5**			Papastrateio "Petros Kapagerof" Pool, Piraeus; Referees: Alessia Ferrari (ITA), Matan Schwartz (ISR)
3 May 2025; 16:00	Report	Plevritou 7	**Goals**	Hertzka 3	Papastrateio "Petros Kapagerof" Pool, Piraeus; Referees: Alessia Ferrari (ITA), Matan Schwartz (ISR)

=== Final ===
3 May 2025; 18:30	Report	Astralpool Sabadell (Spain)	8–**9**	(Spain) **CN Sant Andreu**	Papastrateio "Petros Kapagerof" Pool, Piraeus; Referees: Aurely Blanchard (FRA), Boris Margeta (SLO)
3 May 2025; 18:30	Report	Score by quarters: **3**–2, 2–1, 2–**3**, 1–**3**			Papastrateio "Petros Kapagerof" Pool, Piraeus; Referees: Aurely Blanchard (FRA), Boris Margeta (SLO)
3 May 2025; 18:30	Report	van de Kraats 4	**Goals**	Pérez 3	Papastrateio "Petros Kapagerof" Pool, Piraeus; Referees: Aurely Blanchard (FRA), Boris Margeta (SLO)

2024–25 European Aquatics Women's Champions League Champions

**CN Sant Andreu**
First title

== See also ==
- 2024–25 European Aquatics Champions League
- 2024–25 European Aquatics Euro Cup
- 2024–25 European Aquatics Challenger Cup
- 2024 European Aquatics Super Cup
- 2024–25 European Aquatics Women's Euro Cup
- 2024–25 European Aquatics Women's Challenger Cup
- 2024 European Aquatics Women's Super Cup
