= Dóra Czigány =

Hungarian water polo player

Personal information
- Born: 23 October 1992 (age 33) Cegléd, Hungary
- Height: 5 ft 7 in (1.70 m)
Medal record
Women's water polo
Representing Hungary
European Championships
Gold medal – first place	2016 Belgrade	Team
Bronze medal – third place	2014 Budapest	Team

Dóra Czigány (born 23 October 1992) is a Hungarian female water polo player. At the 2012 Summer Olympics, she competed for the Hungary women's national water polo team in the women's event. She is 5 feet 7 inches (1.70 metres) tall.
