= Rapallo Pallanuoto =

Italian swimming club

- Founded: 1971
- League: men Serie A2 women Serie A1
- Team history: 1971-2011; Rapallo Nuoto; 2012-present Rapallo Pallanuoto
- Based in: Rapallo, Italy
- Arena: Olimpionica comunale di San Pietro di Novella
- Colors: Yellow and pale blue
- President: Enrico Antonucci
- Head coach: Diego Casagrande (men); Luca Antonucci (women)
- Championships: 1 Len Trophy (women); 1 Italian League (women); 1 Italian Cup (women)
- Website: http://www.rapallonuoto.it/

Rapallo Pallanuoto or simply Rapallo is a club affiliated to the Italian Swimming Federation re-founded in 2012 on the way of previous historical Rapallo Nuoto, the latter operating from 1971 to 2011. The club is active in three areas: swimming, water polo and master. The team plays its home games in the Olympic pool Municipal of San Pietro di Novella in Rapallo, near Genoa. Currently the women's water polo team participates in Serie A1; the male, after the promotion in 2013, are recorded in Serie A2.

The team colors are yellow and blue, the symbol of a fish.

== History ==
The first edition of the club (A.S.D. Rapallo Nuoto) was founded in Rapallo on November 30, 1971. In the early years, due to the lack of swimming facilities in the town of Rapallo, the team was forced to "migrate" in the nearby ski Camogli, Recco, Bogliasco and Genoa and carry out the necessary training at sea, in the summer, or at the gym in the autumn and winter seasons.

The move in the other pools was interrupted in 1975 when the new Olympic pool in Rapallo (located in the hamlet of San Pietro di Novella) was brought to completion and delivered to the company Rapallo Nuoto, which still keeps management.

Among the athletes who played in the rapallese men's and women water polo teams there were Marco Formentini, and world champions and Olympic Francesca Christiana Conti and Cinzia Ragusa.

In 1994, the Italian National Olympic Committee has awarded the company the "Bronze Star for Sporting Merit" and in the years 1995-1997-1998-1999-2004-2007 the title "Company of the Year" by the local section of town Panathlon International.

The women's water polo team has played, after promotion in 2006, won by the playoffs against the team Serapo Gaeta, in the Serie A1 league. In the 2010–2011 season the women's team after beating the Dutch sports club Het Ravijn won the LEN Trophy, the first title in its history and the seventh title for Italy from 1999.

In the summer of 2011 it is made official the passage of the same team in the ranks of Pro Recco, becoming, in fact, the new "pink" of the club. The "transfer" of the former company Rapallo Recco will last, however, only one championship in the summer of 2012, following the resignation of the presidency recchelina Gabriele Volpi and family, the team and the women's title will return to Rapallo.

The August 11, 2012 is then re-founded the company rapallese water polo - with the name of Rapallo Pallanuoto - heir of the historic Rapallo Nuoto and continuing the albeit brief period of Pro Recco female. Militant in Serie A1, the new presidency is chaired by Enrico Antonucci and Mario Sinatra in the role of coach and collaborator. In the 2012–2013 season the women's team became champion of Italy, the first title in its history.

The men's team of the club, after years of militancy in the championships of Serie B, with victory over Bergamo Alta won in June 2013 the promotion to Series A2.

In August 2014, the Under-19 team of Rapallo is Champion of Italy after a final victory against the 'SIS Roma.

== Honours ==
=== Women's team ===
Italian League

- Winners (1): 2012-13

Italian Cup

- Winners (1): 2013-14
- Runners-up (1): 2012-13

LEN Trophy

- Winners (1): 2010-11

LEN Super Cup

- Runners-up (1): 2011
