= 2024–25 European Aquatics Women's Euro Cup qualification round =

The 2024–25 European Aquatics Women's Euro Cup qualification round is played between 24 and 27 October 2024 to determine the 8 teams advancing to the Quarterfinals of the 2024–25 European Aquatics Women's Euro Cup.

== Format ==
The 14 teams were place into two groups of five teams and one group of 4. In each group, teams will play against each other once in a round-robin format. The top 3 in the groups of five plus the top 2 from the sole group of four advance.

Teams are ranked according to points (3 points for a win, 2 points for a penalty shootout win, 1 point for a penalty shootout loss, 0 points for a loss), and if tied on points, the following tiebreaking criteria are applied, in the order given, to determine the rankings:

- Points in head-to-head matches among tied teams;
- Goal difference in head-to-head matches among tied teams;
- Goals scored in head-to-head matches among tied teams;
- Goal difference in all group matches;
- Goals scored in all group matches.

== Draw ==
The draw was on 7 October 2024 in Zagreb. The seeding was decided by the club's rankings from the Champions League Qualification round. Teams who have already played in the Champions League are not allowed to be drawn against each other. H indicates which club is hosting the groups. Teams in bold indicate who advanced.

Pot 1	Pot 2	Pot 3
(Netherlands) **ZV De Zaan** (Spain) **Tenerife Echeyde** (Italy) **Pallanuoto Trieste** **(H)** (Greece) **ANC Glyfada iRepair** **(H)**	(Greece) **Panionios GSS** (France) Lille UC (Greece) **Ethnikos Piraeus** (Hungary) Digi Eger (Spain) **EPlus CN Catalunya**	(Italy) Rapallo Pallanuoto (France) Grand Nancy AC (Israel) Hapoel Yoneam (Hungary) **III. Keruleti TVE** (Germany) Spandau 04 **(H)**

== Groups ==
=== Group A ===
- 24–27 October 2024, Glyfada, Greece.

Pos	Team	Pld	W	PSW	PSL	L	GF	GA	GD	Pts	Qualification	(Greece) GLY	(Hungary) KER	(Greece) PAN	(Hungary) EGER	(France) NAN
1	(Greece) ANC Glyfada iRepair (H)	4	3	0	0	1	48	25	+23	**9**	Quarterfinals	—	14–5	6–9	10–4	18–7
2	(Hungary) III. Keruleti TVE	4	2	1	0	1	56	51	+5	**8**	Quarterfinals	—	—	17–14 (Note: Match ended 14–14, III. Keruleti TVE won 3–0 on penalties.)	—	21–12
3	(Greece) Panionios GSS	4	2	0	1	1	48	42	+6	**7**	Quarterfinals	—	—	—	10–11	15–8
4	(Hungary) Digi Eger	4	2	0	0	2	39	37	+2	**6**		—	11–13	—	—	—
5	(France) Grand Nancy AC	4	0	0	0	4	31	67	−36	**0**		—	—	—	4–13	—

Source: European Aquatics
(H) Host

24 October 2024; 18:00	Report	**ANC Glyfada iRepair** (Greece)	**18**–7	(France) Grand Nancy AC	"Ant. Dimitropoulos" Swimming Pool, Glyfada; Referees: Mirko Schiavo (ITA), Henning Schuermann (GER)
24 October 2024; 18:00	Report	Score by quarters: **4**–2, **4**–2, **5**–0, **5**–3			"Ant. Dimitropoulos" Swimming Pool, Glyfada; Referees: Mirko Schiavo (ITA), Henning Schuermann (GER)
24 October 2024; 18:00	Report	Grigoropoulou 5	**Goals**	Kinga, Tiziana 2	"Ant. Dimitropoulos" Swimming Pool, Glyfada; Referees: Mirko Schiavo (ITA), Henning Schuermann (GER)

24 October 2024; 20:00	Report	**III. Keruleti TVE** (Hungary)	**17**–14	(Greece) Panionios GSS	"Ant. Dimitropoulos" Swimming Pool, Glyfada; Referees: Jaume Teixido (ESP), Ayal Gabel (ISR)
24 October 2024; 20:00	Report	Score by quarters: 4–4, **5**–3, 3–3, 2–**4** PSO: **3**–0			"Ant. Dimitropoulos" Swimming Pool, Glyfada; Referees: Jaume Teixido (ESP), Ayal Gabel (ISR)
24 October 2024; 20:00	Report	three players 3	**Goals**	Arima, Bitsakou 3	"Ant. Dimitropoulos" Swimming Pool, Glyfada; Referees: Jaume Teixido (ESP), Ayal Gabel (ISR)

25 October 2024; 18:00	Report	**ANC Glyfada iRepair** (Greece)	**14**–5	(Hungary) III. Keruleti TVE	"Ant. Dimitropoulos" Swimming Pool, Glyfada; Referees: Jaume Teixido (ESP), Ayal Gabel (ISR)
25 October 2024; 18:00	Report	Score by quarters: **4**–2, **3**–1, **3**–1, **4**–1			"Ant. Dimitropoulos" Swimming Pool, Glyfada; Referees: Jaume Teixido (ESP), Ayal Gabel (ISR)
25 October 2024; 18:00	Report	Turner 6	**Goals**	Torok 3	"Ant. Dimitropoulos" Swimming Pool, Glyfada; Referees: Jaume Teixido (ESP), Ayal Gabel (ISR)

25 October 2024; 20:00	Report	Panionios GSS (Greece)	10–**11**	(Hungary) **Digi Eger**	"Ant. Dimitropoulos" Swimming Pool, Glyfada; Referees: Mirko Schiavo (ITA), Henning Schuermann (GER)
25 October 2024; 20:00	Report	Score by quarters: 2–2, 3–3, 3–3, 2–**3**			"Ant. Dimitropoulos" Swimming Pool, Glyfada; Referees: Mirko Schiavo (ITA), Henning Schuermann (GER)
25 October 2024; 20:00	Report	Arima 5	**Goals**	Szellak 6	"Ant. Dimitropoulos" Swimming Pool, Glyfada; Referees: Mirko Schiavo (ITA), Henning Schuermann (GER)

26 October 2024; 10:00	Report	Digi Eger (Hungary)	11–**13**	(Hungary) **III. Keruleti TVE**	"Ant. Dimitropoulos" Swimming Pool, Glyfada; Referees: Jaume Teixido (ESP), Henning Schuermann (GER)
26 October 2024; 10:00	Report	Score by quarters: 1–**2**, **5**–1, 3–**5**, 2–**5**			"Ant. Dimitropoulos" Swimming Pool, Glyfada; Referees: Jaume Teixido (ESP), Henning Schuermann (GER)
26 October 2024; 10:00	Report	Borsi, Pogonyi 4	**Goals**	Hajdu 5	"Ant. Dimitropoulos" Swimming Pool, Glyfada; Referees: Jaume Teixido (ESP), Henning Schuermann (GER)

26 October 2024; 12:00	Report	**Panionios GSS** (Greece)	**15**–8	(France) Grand Nancy AC	"Ant. Dimitropoulos" Swimming Pool, Glyfada; Referees: Mirko Schiavo (ITA), Ayal Gabel (ISR)
26 October 2024; 12:00	Report	Score by quarters: **5**–3, **4**–1, **3**–0, 3–**4**			"Ant. Dimitropoulos" Swimming Pool, Glyfada; Referees: Mirko Schiavo (ITA), Ayal Gabel (ISR)
26 October 2024; 12:00	Report	Arima 4	**Goals**	Benlekbir 5	"Ant. Dimitropoulos" Swimming Pool, Glyfada; Referees: Mirko Schiavo (ITA), Ayal Gabel (ISR)

26 October 2024; 18:00	Report	**ANC Glyfada iRepair** (Greece)	**10**–4	(Hungary) Digi Eger	"Ant. Dimitropoulos" Swimming Pool, Glyfada; Referees: Jaume Teixido (ESP), Mirko Schiavo (ITA)
26 October 2024; 18:00	Report	Score by quarters: **2**–1, **3**–1, **3**–2, **2**–0			"Ant. Dimitropoulos" Swimming Pool, Glyfada; Referees: Jaume Teixido (ESP), Mirko Schiavo (ITA)
26 October 2024; 18:00	Report	Loudi, Turner 2	**Goals**	four players 1	"Ant. Dimitropoulos" Swimming Pool, Glyfada; Referees: Jaume Teixido (ESP), Mirko Schiavo (ITA)

26 October 2024; 20:00	Report	**III. Keruleti TVE** (Hungary)	**21**–12	(France) Grand Nancy AC	"Ant. Dimitropoulos" Swimming Pool, Glyfada; Referees: Ayal Gabel (ISR), Henning Schuermann (GER)
26 October 2024; 20:00	Report	Score by quarters: **5**–3, **6**–1, 3–3, **7**–5			"Ant. Dimitropoulos" Swimming Pool, Glyfada; Referees: Ayal Gabel (ISR), Henning Schuermann (GER)
26 October 2024; 20:00	Report	three players 4	**Goals**	Martella 5	"Ant. Dimitropoulos" Swimming Pool, Glyfada; Referees: Ayal Gabel (ISR), Henning Schuermann (GER)

27 October 2024; 08:00	Report	Grand Nancy AC (France)	4–**13**	(Hungary) **Digi Eger**	"Ant. Dimitropoulos" Swimming Pool, Glyfada; Referees: Mirko Schiavo (ITA), Ayal Gabel (ISR)
27 October 2024; 08:00	Report	Score by quarters: 2–**3**, 1–**4**, 1–**3**, 0–**3**			"Ant. Dimitropoulos" Swimming Pool, Glyfada; Referees: Mirko Schiavo (ITA), Ayal Gabel (ISR)
27 October 2024; 08:00	Report	Dubna 2	**Goals**	Lendvai 7	"Ant. Dimitropoulos" Swimming Pool, Glyfada; Referees: Mirko Schiavo (ITA), Ayal Gabel (ISR)

27 October 2024; 12:00	Report	ANC Glyfada iRepair (Greece)	6–**9**	(Greece) **Panionios GSS**	"Ant. Dimitropoulos" Swimming Pool, Glyfada; Referees: Jaume Teixido (ESP), Henning Schuermann (GER)
27 October 2024; 12:00	Report	Score by quarters: 0–**2**, 3–3, 1–**3**, **2**–1			"Ant. Dimitropoulos" Swimming Pool, Glyfada; Referees: Jaume Teixido (ESP), Henning Schuermann (GER)
27 October 2024; 12:00	Report	Moustakaria, Tzortzakaki 2	**Goals**	Arima 4	"Ant. Dimitropoulos" Swimming Pool, Glyfada; Referees: Jaume Teixido (ESP), Henning Schuermann (GER)

=== Group B ===
- 24–27 October 2024, Berlin, Germany.

Pos	Team	Pld	W	PSW	PSL	L	GF	GA	GD	Pts	Qualification	(Netherlands) ZAAN	(Spain) CAT	(Greece) ETH	(Israel) HAP	(Germany) SPA
1	(Netherlands) ZV De Zaan	4	4	0	0	0	63	39	+24	**12**	Quarterfinals	—	—	—	19–11	—
2	(Spain) EPlus CN Catalunya	4	2	0	0	2	38	39	−1	**6 (Note: EPlus CN Catalunya 9–6 Ethnikos Piraeus)**	Quarterfinals	10–13	—	9–6	8–11	—
3	(Greece) Ethnikos Piraeus	4	2	0	0	2	46	43	+3	**6**	Quarterfinals	9–14	—	—	—	—
4	(Israel) Hapoel Yoneam	4	1	1	0	2	45	53	−8	**5**		—	—	13–18	—	—
5	(Germany) Spandau 04 (H)	4	0	0	1	3	33	51	−18	**1**		9–17	9–11	7–13	8–10 (Note: Match ended 7–7, Hapoel Yoneam won 3–1 on penalties)	—

Source: European Aquatics
(H) Host
Notes:

24 October 2024; 18:00	Report	Spandau 04 (Germany)	9–**11**	(Spain) **EPlus CN Catalunya**	Schöneberg Swimming Hall, Berlin; Referees: Nikolett Sajben (HUN), Luis Alves (POR)
24 October 2024; 18:00	Report	Score by quarters: **3**–2, 1–**4**, **3**–2, 2–**3**			Schöneberg Swimming Hall, Berlin; Referees: Nikolett Sajben (HUN), Luis Alves (POR)
24 October 2024; 18:00	Report	Kangler 3	**Goals**	Vosseberg 4	Schöneberg Swimming Hall, Berlin; Referees: Nikolett Sajben (HUN), Luis Alves (POR)

24 October 2024; 20:00	Report	**ZV De Zaan** (Netherlands)	**19**–11	(Israel) Hapoel Yoneam	Schöneberg Swimming Hall, Berlin; Referees: Gregory Courbin (FRA), George Makharadze (UKR)
24 October 2024; 20:00	Report	Score by quarters: **6**–2, **4**–1, **7**–3, 2–**5**			Schöneberg Swimming Hall, Berlin; Referees: Gregory Courbin (FRA), George Makharadze (UKR)
24 October 2024; 20:00	Report	four players 3	**Goals**	Bogachenko 3	Schöneberg Swimming Hall, Berlin; Referees: Gregory Courbin (FRA), George Makharadze (UKR)

25 October 2024; 10:00	Report	Hapoel Yoneam (Israel)	13–**18**	(Greece) **Ethnikos Piraeus**	Schöneberg Swimming Hall, Berlin; Referees: Luis Alves (POR), George Makharadze (UKR)
25 October 2024; 10:00	Report	Score by quarters: 3–**7**, 2–**5**, 2–2, **6**–4			Schöneberg Swimming Hall, Berlin; Referees: Luis Alves (POR), George Makharadze (UKR)
25 October 2024; 10:00	Report	Bogachenko 6	**Goals**	Beti, Mamoglou 4	Schöneberg Swimming Hall, Berlin; Referees: Luis Alves (POR), George Makharadze (UKR)

25 October 2024; 12:00	Report	EPlus CN Catalunya (Spain)	10–**13**	(Netherlands) **ZV De Zaan**	Schöneberg Swimming Hall, Berlin; Referees: Gregory Courbin (FRA), Nikolett Sajben (HUN)
25 October 2024; 12:00	Report	Score by quarters: 3–3, 3–**5**, **2**–1, 2–**4**			Schöneberg Swimming Hall, Berlin; Referees: Gregory Courbin (FRA), Nikolett Sajben (HUN)
25 October 2024; 12:00	Report	Diaz Muñoz, Frigola Navarro 3	**Goals**	Rogge 3	Schöneberg Swimming Hall, Berlin; Referees: Gregory Courbin (FRA), Nikolett Sajben (HUN)

25 October 2024; 18:00	Report	Spandau 04 (Germany)	7–**13**	(Greece) **Ethnikos Piraeus**	Schöneberg Swimming Hall, Berlin; Referees: George Makharadze (UKR), Nikolett Sajben (HUN)
25 October 2024; 18:00	Report	Score by quarters: 1–**2**, 1–**2**, 1–**4**, 4–**5**			Schöneberg Swimming Hall, Berlin; Referees: George Makharadze (UKR), Nikolett Sajben (HUN)
25 October 2024; 18:00	Report	Howarth 3	**Goals**	Kanetidou 5	Schöneberg Swimming Hall, Berlin; Referees: George Makharadze (UKR), Nikolett Sajben (HUN)

25 October 2024; 20:00	Report	EPlus CN Catalunya (Spain)	8–**11**	(Israel) **Hapoel Yoneam**	Schöneberg Swimming Hall, Berlin; Referees: Luis Alves (POR), Gregory Courbin (FRA)
25 October 2024; 20:00	Report	Score by quarters: 3–**5**, 1–1, 2–**3**, 2–2			Schöneberg Swimming Hall, Berlin; Referees: Luis Alves (POR), Gregory Courbin (FRA)
25 October 2024; 20:00	Report	Vosseberg 3	**Goals**	Bogachenko 4	Schöneberg Swimming Hall, Berlin; Referees: Luis Alves (POR), Gregory Courbin (FRA)

26 October 2024; 15:00	Report	Ethnikos Piraeus (Greece)	9–**14**	(Netherlands) **ZV De Zaan**	Schöneberg Swimming Hall, Berlin; Referees: Nikolett Sajben (HUN), Luis Alves (POR)
26 October 2024; 15:00	Report	Score by quarters: 2–**5**, 2–**3**, 1–**6**, **4**–0			Schöneberg Swimming Hall, Berlin; Referees: Nikolett Sajben (HUN), Luis Alves (POR)
26 October 2024; 15:00	Report	three players 2	**Goals**	Rogge 3	Schöneberg Swimming Hall, Berlin; Referees: Nikolett Sajben (HUN), Luis Alves (POR)

26 October 2024; 17:00	Report	Spandau 04 (Germany)	8–**10**	(Israel) **Hapoel Yoneam**	Schöneberg Swimming Hall, Berlin; Referees: Gregory Courbin (FRA), George Makharadze (UKR)
26 October 2024; 17:00	Report	Score by quarters: 2–**3**, 0–**1**, **3**–0, 2–**3** PSO: 1–**3**			Schöneberg Swimming Hall, Berlin; Referees: Gregory Courbin (FRA), George Makharadze (UKR)
26 October 2024; 17:00	Report	Deike 4	**Goals**	Bogachenko 4	Schöneberg Swimming Hall, Berlin; Referees: Gregory Courbin (FRA), George Makharadze (UKR)

27 October 2024; 10:00	Report	**EPlus CN Catalunya** (Spain)	**9**–6	(Greece) Ethnikos Piraeus	Schöneberg Swimming Hall, Berlin; Referees: Gregory Courbin (FRA), Nikolett Sajben (HUN)
27 October 2024; 10:00	Report	Score by quarters: 1–1, **4**–0, 2–**3**, 2–2			Schöneberg Swimming Hall, Berlin; Referees: Gregory Courbin (FRA), Nikolett Sajben (HUN)
27 October 2024; 10:00	Report	Diaz Velazquez 3	**Goals**	Kanetidou 3	Schöneberg Swimming Hall, Berlin; Referees: Gregory Courbin (FRA), Nikolett Sajben (HUN)

27 October 2024; 12:00	Report	Spandau 04 (Germany)	9–**17**	(Netherlands) **ZV De Zaan**	Schöneberg Swimming Hall, Berlin; Referees: George Makharadze (UKR), Luis Alves (POR)
27 October 2024; 12:00	Report	Score by quarters: 2–**4**, **5**–4, 2–**6**, 0–**3**			Schöneberg Swimming Hall, Berlin; Referees: George Makharadze (UKR), Luis Alves (POR)
27 October 2024; 12:00	Report	Deike 4	**Goals**	three players 4	Schöneberg Swimming Hall, Berlin; Referees: George Makharadze (UKR), Luis Alves (POR)

=== Group C ===
- 25–27 October 2024, Trieste, Italy.

Pos	Team	Pld	W	PSW	PSL	L	GF	GA	GD	Pts	Qualification	(Italy) TRI	(Spain) TEN	(Italy) RAP	(France) LIL
1	(Italy) Pallanuoto Trieste (H)	3	2	0	0	1	30	22	+8	**6 (Note: Head-to-head goal difference: Pallanuoto Trieste +2, Rapallo Pallanuoto 0, Tenerife Echeyde –2. Despite the goal difference, Tenerife Echeyde is ranked ahead of Rapallo Pallanuoto due to the match between them.)**	Quarterfinals	—	—	10–11	10–4
2	(Spain) Tenerife Echeyde	3	2	0	0	1	32	30	+2	**6**	Quarterfinals	7–10	—	—	—
3	(Italy) Rapallo Pallanuoto	3	2	0	0	1	32	27	+5	**6**		—	9–10	—	—
4	(France) Lille UC	3	0	0	0	3	22	37	−15	**0**		—	11–15	7–12	—

Source: European Aquatics
(H) Host
Notes:

25 October 2024; 18:00	Report	Rapallo Pallanuoto (Italy)	9–**10**	(Spain) **Tenerife Echeyde**	Bruno Bianchi Swimming Center, Trieste; Referees: Sander Gransjean (NED), Georgios K. Polychronopoulos (GRE)
25 October 2024; 18:00	Report	Score by quarters: 1–1, 3–3, 2–2, 3–**4**			Bruno Bianchi Swimming Center, Trieste; Referees: Sander Gransjean (NED), Georgios K. Polychronopoulos (GRE)
25 October 2024; 18:00	Report	Kudella 2	**Goals**	Dempsey 4	Bruno Bianchi Swimming Center, Trieste; Referees: Sander Gransjean (NED), Georgios K. Polychronopoulos (GRE)

25 October 2024; 20:00	Report	**Pallanuoto Trieste** (Italy)	**10**–4	(France) Lille UC	Bruno Bianchi Swimming Center, Trieste; Referees: Ilkin Cakmakoglu (TUR), Ruben Garcia (SUI)
25 October 2024; 20:00	Report	Score by quarters: **3**–1, **3**–1, 1–1, **3**–1			Bruno Bianchi Swimming Center, Trieste; Referees: Ilkin Cakmakoglu (TUR), Ruben Garcia (SUI)
25 October 2024; 20:00	Report	Cergol 3	**Goals**	Andres 2	Bruno Bianchi Swimming Center, Trieste; Referees: Ilkin Cakmakoglu (TUR), Ruben Garcia (SUI)

26 October 2024; 18:00	Report	Tenerife Echeyde (Spain)	7–**10**	(Italy) **Pallanuoto Trieste**	Bruno Bianchi Swimming Center, Trieste; Referees: Ruben Garcia (SUI), Georgios K. Polychronopoulos (GRE)
26 October 2024; 18:00	Report	Score by quarters: 2–**3**, 1–**4**, **3**–1, 1–**2**			Bruno Bianchi Swimming Center, Trieste; Referees: Ruben Garcia (SUI), Georgios K. Polychronopoulos (GRE)
26 October 2024; 18:00	Report	Dempsey, Naya Manero 3	**Goals**	four players 2	Bruno Bianchi Swimming Center, Trieste; Referees: Ruben Garcia (SUI), Georgios K. Polychronopoulos (GRE)

26 October 2024; 20:00	Report	Lille UC (France)	7–**12**	(Italy) **Rapallo Pallanuoto**	Bruno Bianchi Swimming Center, Trieste; Referees: Ilkin Cakmakoglu (TUR), Sander Gransjean (NED)
26 October 2024; 20:00	Report	Score by quarters: 1–**2**, 2–**4**, 0–**2**, 4–4			Bruno Bianchi Swimming Center, Trieste; Referees: Ilkin Cakmakoglu (TUR), Sander Gransjean (NED)
26 October 2024; 20:00	Report	seven players 1	**Goals**	five players 2	Bruno Bianchi Swimming Center, Trieste; Referees: Ilkin Cakmakoglu (TUR), Sander Gransjean (NED)

27 October 2024; 10:00	Report	Lille UC (France)	11–15	(Spain) **Tenerife Echeyde**	Bruno Bianchi Swimming Center, Trieste; Referees: Ilkin Cakmakoglu (TUR), Georgios K. Polychronopoulos (GRE)
27 October 2024; 10:00	Report	Score by quarters: 3–**4**, **4**–2, 2–**3**, 2–**6**			Bruno Bianchi Swimming Center, Trieste; Referees: Ilkin Cakmakoglu (TUR), Georgios K. Polychronopoulos (GRE)
27 October 2024; 10:00	Report	Bujka 4	**Goals**	Dempsey 5	Bruno Bianchi Swimming Center, Trieste; Referees: Ilkin Cakmakoglu (TUR), Georgios K. Polychronopoulos (GRE)

27 October 2024; 12:00	Report	Pallanuoto Trieste (Italy)	10–**11**	(Italy) **Rapallo Pallanuoto**	Bruno Bianchi Swimming Center, Trieste; Referees: Sander Gransjean (NED), Ruben Garcia (SUI)
27 October 2024; 12:00	Report	Score by quarters: 1–**2**, **4**–3, 2–**4**, **3**–2			Bruno Bianchi Swimming Center, Trieste; Referees: Sander Gransjean (NED), Ruben Garcia (SUI)
27 October 2024; 12:00	Report	Cergol 5	**Goals**	Bianconi 3	Bruno Bianchi Swimming Center, Trieste; Referees: Sander Gransjean (NED), Ruben Garcia (SUI)

== See also ==
- 2024–25 European Aquatics Champions League
- 2024–25 European Aquatics Euro Cup
- 2024–25 European Aquatics Challenger Cup
- 2024 European Aquatics Super Cup
- 2024–25 European Aquatics Women's Champions League
- 2024–25 European Aquatics Women's Euro Cup
- 2024–25 European Aquatics Women's Challenger Cup
- 2024 European Aquatics Women's Super Cup
