= 2024–25 European Aquatics Women's Euro Cup =

Water polo competition

European Aquatics Women's Euro Cup
- 2024–25

Tournament information
- Sport: Water polo
- Dates: Qualification round: 24–27 October 2024; Knockout stage: 16 November–5 April 2025
- Teams: Total: 14 (from 8 countries)
- Website: Official website

Final positions
- Champions: (Netherlands) ZV De Zaan (1st title)
- Runner-up: (Italy) Pallanuoto Trieste

Tournament statistics
- Matches played: 40
- Goals scored: 839 (20.98 per match)

The 2024–25 European Aquatics Women's Euro Cup is the 26th edition of Europe's secondary club water polo competition organised by the European Aquatics. Antenore Plebiscito Padova are the reigning champions although they will not defend their title after qualifying for the Main round of the Champions League.

ZV De Zaan won their first title after defeating Pallanuoto Trieste in the final, becoming the first Dutch team to win the Euro Cup.

== Format ==
The fourteen teams that failed to make the Women's Champions League group stage go into three round robin groups of four and five. The groups are held at a centralised venue. The top teams in each group qualify for the knockout stage, which include the Quarterfinals, Semifinals and final to decide the winners of the European Aquatics Women's Euro Cup.

== Rankings ==
Rank	Association	Points	Teams
1	Spain	124,200	2
2	Greece	105,102.5	3
3	Hungary	89,452.5	2
4	Italy	76,760	2
5	France	35,147.5	2
6	Netherlands	13,785	1
7	Russia	9,217.5	0
8	Germany	8,290	1
9	Portugal	6,010	0
10	Malta	4,090	0

Rank	Association	Points	Teams
11	Croatia	2,930	0
12	Serbia	2,860	0
13	Turkey	2,560	0
14	Slovakia	1,715	0
15	(United Kingdom) Great Britain	1,330	0
16	Israel	1,250	1
17	Sweden	1,060	0
18	Bulgaria	770	0
19	Czech Republic	770	0

== Teams ==
Teams that failed to make the main round of the Champions League participate in this tournament.

Teams
(France) Lille UC	(France) Grand Nancy AC	(Germany) Spandau 04	(Greece) Ethnikos Piraeus
(Greece) ANC Glyfada iRepair	(Greece) Panionios GSS	(Hungary) Digi Eger	(Hungary) III. Keruleti TVE
(Israel) Hapoel Yoneam	(Italy) Rapallo Pallanuoto	(Italy) Pallanuoto Trieste	(Netherlands) ZV De Zaan
(Spain) EPlus CN Catalunya	(Spain) Tenerife Echeyde		

== Round and draw dates ==
=== Schedule ===
Phase	Round	Round date
Quailfication round		24–27 October 2024
Quarterfinals	First leg	16 November 2024
Quarterfinals	Second leg	30 November 2024
Semifinals	First leg	25 January 2025
Semifinals	Second leg	15 February 2025
Final	First leg	15 March 2025
Final	Second leg	5 April 2025

== Qualification round ==
In the qualification round, teams play in a round robin format. The top 3 in the groups of five plus the top 2 from the sole group of four advance.

=== Draw ===
The draw was on 7 October 2024 in Zagreb. The seeding was decided by the club's rankings from the Champions League Qualification round. Teams who have already played in the Champions League are not allowed to be drawn against each other. H indicates which club is hosting the groups. Teams in bold indicate who advanced.

Pot 1	Pot 2	Pot 3
(Netherlands) **ZV De Zaan** (Spain) **Tenerife Echeyde** (Italy) **Pallanuoto Trieste** **(H)** (Greece) **ANC Glyfada iRepair** **(H)**	(Greece) **Panionios GSS** (France) Lille UC (Greece) **Ethnikos Piraeus** (Hungary) Digi Eger (Spain) **EPlus CN Catalunya**	(Italy) Rapallo Pallanuoto (France) Grand Nancy AC (Israel) Hapoel Yoneam (Hungary) **III. Keruleti TVE** (Germany) Spandau 04 **(H)**

=== Group A ===
- 24–27 October 2024, Glyfada, Greece.

Pos	Team	Pld	W	PSW	PSL	L	GF	GA	GD	Pts	Qualification	(Greece) GLY	(Hungary) KER	(Greece) PAN	(Hungary) EGER	(France) NAN
1	(Greece) ANC Glyfada iRepair (H)	4	3	0	0	1	48	25	+23	**9**	Quarterfinals	—	14–5	6–9	10–4	18–7
2	(Hungary) III. Keruleti TVE	4	2	1	0	1	56	51	+5	**8**	Quarterfinals	—	—	17–14 (Note: Match ended 14–14, III. Keruleti TVE won 3–0 on penalties.)	—	21–12
3	(Greece) Panionios GSS	4	2	0	1	1	48	42	+6	**7**	Quarterfinals	—	—	—	10–11	15–8
4	(Hungary) Digi Eger	4	2	0	0	2	39	37	+2	**6**		—	11–13	—	—	—
5	(France) Grand Nancy AC	4	0	0	0	4	31	67	−36	**0**		—	—	—	4–13	—

Source: European Aquatics
(H) Host

=== Group B ===
- 24–27 October 2024, Berlin, Germany.

Pos	Team	Pld	W	PSW	PSL	L	GF	GA	GD	Pts	Qualification	(Netherlands) ZAAN	(Spain) CAT	(Greece) ETH	(Israel) HAP	(Germany) SPA
1	(Netherlands) ZV De Zaan	4	4	0	0	0	63	39	+24	**12**	Quarterfinals	—	—	—	19–11	—
2	(Spain) EPlus CN Catalunya	4	2	0	0	2	38	39	−1	**6 (Note: EPlus CN Catalunya 9–6 Ethnikos Piraeus)**	Quarterfinals	10–13	—	9–6	8–11	—
3	(Greece) Ethnikos Piraeus	4	2	0	0	2	46	43	+3	**6**	Quarterfinals	9–14	—	—	—	—
4	(Israel) Hapoel Yoneam	4	1	1	0	2	45	53	−8	**5**		—	—	13–18	—	—
5	(Germany) Spandau 04 (H)	4	0	0	1	3	33	51	−18	**1**		9–17	9–11	7–13	8–10 (Note: Match ended 7–7, Hapoel Yoneam won 3–1 on penalties)	—

Source: European Aquatics
(H) Host

=== Group C ===
- 25–27 October 2024, Trieste, Italy.

Pos	Team	Pld	W	PSW	PSL	L	GF	GA	GD	Pts	Qualification	(Italy) TRI	(Spain) TEN	(Italy) RAP	(France) LIL
1	(Italy) Pallanuoto Trieste (H)	3	2	0	0	1	30	22	+8	**6 (Note: Head-to-head goal difference: Pallanuoto Trieste +2, Rapallo Pallanuoto 0, Tenerife Echeyde –2. Despite the goal difference, Tenerife Echeyde is ranked ahead of Rapallo Pallanuoto due to the match between them.)**	Quarterfinals	—	—	10–11	10–4
2	(Spain) Tenerife Echeyde	3	2	0	0	1	32	30	+2	**6**	Quarterfinals	7–10	—	—	—
3	(Italy) Rapallo Pallanuoto	3	2	0	0	1	32	27	+5	**6**		—	9–10	—	—
4	(France) Lille UC	3	0	0	0	3	22	37	−15	**0**		—	11–15	7–12	—

Source: European Aquatics
(H) Host

== Knockout stage ==
=== Draw ===
The draw took place on 28 October in Zagreb. The seeding was decided by the club's rankings from the previous round. Teams who have already played in the previous round are not allowed to be drawn against each other.

Pot 1	Pot 2	Pot 3
(Greece) ANC Glyfada iRepair (Netherlands) ZV De Zaan (Italy) Pallanuoto Trieste	(Hungary) III. Keruleti TVE (Spain) EPlus CN Catalunya (Spain) Tenerife Echeyde	(Greece) Panionios GSS (Greece) Ethnikos Piraeus

=== Bracket ===
Quarterfinals
(Italy) Pallanuoto Trieste	14	14	28
(Hungary) III. Keruleti TVE	13	9	22
(Spain) Tenerife Echeyde	12	8	20
(Spain) EPlus CN Catalunya	12	7	19
(Greece) Ethnikos Piraeus	5	3	8
(Greece) ANC Glyfada iRepair	7	6	13
(Greece) Panionios GSS	10	11	21
(Netherlands) ZV De Zaan	12	18	30

Semifinals
(Italy) Pallanuoto Trieste	15	8	23
(Spain) Tenerife Echeyde	9	7	16
(Greece) ANC Glyfada iRepair	6	10	16
(Netherlands) ZV De Zaan	9	11	20

Final
(Italy) Pallanuoto Trieste	9	7	16
(Netherlands) ZV De Zaan	10	14	24

=== Quarterfinals ===
Team 1	Agg.	Team 2	1st leg	2nd leg
Pallanuoto Trieste (Italy)	28–22	(Hungary) III. Keruleti TVE	14–13	14–9
Tenerife Echeyde (Spain)	20–19	(Spain) EPlus CN Catalunya	12–12	8–7
Ethnikos Piraeus (Greece)	8–13	(Greece) ANC Glyfada iRepair	5–7	3–6
Panionios GSS (Greece)	21–30	(Netherlands) ZV De Zaan	10–12	11–18

==== Matches ====
16 November 2024; 18:30	Report	Pallanuoto Trieste (Italy)	14–13	(Hungary) III. Keruleti TVE	Bruno Bianchi Swimming Center, Trieste; Referees: Sander Gransjean (NED), Ralf Mueller (GER)
16 November 2024; 18:30	Report	Score by quarters: 3–5, 4–2, 4–3, 3–3			Bruno Bianchi Swimming Center, Trieste; Referees: Sander Gransjean (NED), Ralf Mueller (GER)
16 November 2024; 18:30	Report	Gragnolati 6	Goals	Raski 4	Bruno Bianchi Swimming Center, Trieste; Referees: Sander Gransjean (NED), Ralf Mueller (GER)

30 November 2024; 18:00	Report	III. Keruleti TVE (Hungary)	9–14	(Italy) Pallanuoto Trieste	Budapest, Hungary; Referees: Maria Daskalopoulou (GRE), Anne Grandin (FRA)
30 November 2024; 18:00	Report	Score by quarters: 2–2, 4–5, 1–4, 2–3			Budapest, Hungary; Referees: Maria Daskalopoulou (GRE), Anne Grandin (FRA)
30 November 2024; 18:00	Report	Gyongyossy, Raski 3	Goals	Gant, Cordovani 3	Budapest, Hungary; Referees: Maria Daskalopoulou (GRE), Anne Grandin (FRA)

Pallanuoto Trieste won 28–22 on aggregate

17 November 2024; 13:30	Report	Tenerife Echeyde (Spain)	12–12	(Spain) EPlus CN Catalunya	Acidalio Lorenzo Swimming Pool, Tenerife; Referees: Maxim Gerasimov (GBR), Grigorios Spanoudis (GRE)
17 November 2024; 13:30	Report	Score by quarters: 3–3, 4–4, 3–2, 2–3			Acidalio Lorenzo Swimming Pool, Tenerife; Referees: Maxim Gerasimov (GBR), Grigorios Spanoudis (GRE)
17 November 2024; 13:30	Report	Martin Buscarons, Ramos Fernandez 3	Goals	Diaz Velazquez 6	Acidalio Lorenzo Swimming Pool, Tenerife; Referees: Maxim Gerasimov (GBR), Grigorios Spanoudis (GRE)

30 November 2024; 16:00	Report	EPlus CN Catalunya (Spain)	7–8	(Spain) Tenerife Echeyde	Sant Jordi Swimming Pool, Barcelona; Referees: Luis Santos (POR), Ivanka Krstonosic Rakovic (SRB)
30 November 2024; 16:00	Report	Score by quarters: 1–1, 2–2, 3–4, 1–1			Sant Jordi Swimming Pool, Barcelona; Referees: Luis Santos (POR), Ivanka Krstonosic Rakovic (SRB)
30 November 2024; 16:00	Report	Diaz Velazquez 3	Goals	four players 2	Sant Jordi Swimming Pool, Barcelona; Referees: Luis Santos (POR), Ivanka Krstonosic Rakovic (SRB)

Tenerife Echeyde won 20–19 on aggregate

16 November 2024; 19:00	Report	Ethnikos Piraeus (Greece)	5–7	(Greece) ANC Glyfada iRepair	Papastrateio Pool, Piraeus; Referees: Giuliana Nicolosi (ITA), Alex Marquez (ESP)
16 November 2024; 19:00	Report	Score by quarters: 0–2, 2–1, 2–3, 1–1			Papastrateio Pool, Piraeus; Referees: Giuliana Nicolosi (ITA), Alex Marquez (ESP)
16 November 2024; 19:00	Report	Kanetidou, Milicevic 2	Goals	Tzortzakati 3	Papastrateio Pool, Piraeus; Referees: Giuliana Nicolosi (ITA), Alex Marquez (ESP)

30 November 2024; 15:00	Report	ANC Glyfada iRepair (Greece)	6–3	(Greece) Ethnikos Piraeus	"Ant. Dimitropoulos" Swimming Pool, Glyfada; Referees: Sara Kontek (CRO), Nikolett Sajben (HUN)
30 November 2024; 15:00	Report	Score by quarters: 3–1, 0–1, 1–1, 2–0			"Ant. Dimitropoulos" Swimming Pool, Glyfada; Referees: Sara Kontek (CRO), Nikolett Sajben (HUN)
30 November 2024; 15:00	Report	Ninou, Turner 2	Goals	three players 1	"Ant. Dimitropoulos" Swimming Pool, Glyfada; Referees: Sara Kontek (CRO), Nikolett Sajben (HUN)

ANC Glyfada iRepair won 13–8 on aggregate

16 November 2024; 19:00	Report	Panionios GSS (Greece)	10–12	(Netherlands) ZV De Zaan	Nea Smyrni Swimming Pool, Athens; Referees: Nora Debreceni (HUN), Ilkin Cakmakoglu (TUR)
16 November 2024; 19:00	Report	Score by quarters: 3–4, 2–4, 3–1, 2–3			Nea Smyrni Swimming Pool, Athens; Referees: Nora Debreceni (HUN), Ilkin Cakmakoglu (TUR)
16 November 2024; 19:00	Report	Douli 4	Goals	Rogge 6	Nea Smyrni Swimming Pool, Athens; Referees: Nora Debreceni (HUN), Ilkin Cakmakoglu (TUR)

30 November 2024; 20:30	Report	ZV De Zaan (Netherlands)	18–11	(Greece) Panionios GSS	Het Sloterparkbad, Amsterdam; Referees: Carla Martin (ESP), Martina Kunikova (SVK)
30 November 2024; 20:30	Report	Score by quarters: 2–2, 4–2, 8–5, 4–2			Het Sloterparkbad, Amsterdam; Referees: Carla Martin (ESP), Martina Kunikova (SVK)
30 November 2024; 20:30	Report	Den Ouden 4	Goals	Allen, Douli 3	Het Sloterparkbad, Amsterdam; Referees: Carla Martin (ESP), Martina Kunikova (SVK)

ZV De Zaan won 30–21 on aggregate

=== Semifinals ===
Team 1	Agg.	Team 2	1st leg	2nd leg
Pallanuoto Trieste (Italy)	23–16	(Spain) Tenerife Echeyde	15–9	8–7
ANC Glyfada iRepair (Greece)	16–20	(Netherlands) ZV De Zaan	6–9	10–11

==== Matches ====
25 January 2025; 20:30	Report	Pallanuoto Trieste (Italy)	15–9	(Spain) Tenerife Echeyde	Bruno Bianchi Swimming Center, Trieste; Referees: Aurely Blanchrad (FRA), Ivanka Rakovic Krstonosic (SRB)
25 January 2025; 20:30	Report	Score by quarters: 4–1, 5–3, 4–3, 2–2			Bruno Bianchi Swimming Center, Trieste; Referees: Aurely Blanchrad (FRA), Ivanka Rakovic Krstonosic (SRB)
25 January 2025; 20:30	Report	Gragnolati 4	Goals	Borg, Dempsey 3	Bruno Bianchi Swimming Center, Trieste; Referees: Aurely Blanchrad (FRA), Ivanka Rakovic Krstonosic (SRB)

15 February 2025; 18:00	Report	Tenerife Echeyde (Spain)	7–8	(Italy) Pallanuoto Trieste	Acidalio Lorenzo Swimming Pool, Tenerife
15 February 2025; 18:00	Report	Score by quarters: 2–1, 0–3, 1–1, 4–3			Acidalio Lorenzo Swimming Pool, Tenerife
15 February 2025; 18:00	Report	Naya Manero 3	Goals	Cordovani 2	Acidalio Lorenzo Swimming Pool, Tenerife

Pallanuoto Trieste won 23–16 on aggregate

25 January 2025; 15:00	Report	ANC Glyfada iRepair (Greece)	6–9	(Netherlands) ZV De Zaan	"Ant. Dimitropoulos" Swimming Pool, Glyfada; Referees: Ilkin Cakmakoglu (TUR), Alexandru-Andrei Mustata (ROU)
25 January 2025; 15:00	Report	Score by quarters: 2–4, 3–1, 1–2, 0–2			"Ant. Dimitropoulos" Swimming Pool, Glyfada; Referees: Ilkin Cakmakoglu (TUR), Alexandru-Andrei Mustata (ROU)
25 January 2025; 15:00	Report	three players 2	Goals	Rogge 3	"Ant. Dimitropoulos" Swimming Pool, Glyfada; Referees: Ilkin Cakmakoglu (TUR), Alexandru-Andrei Mustata (ROU)

15 February 2025; 18:00	Report	ZV De Zaan (Netherlands)	11–10	(Greece) ANC Glyfada iRepair	Het Sloterparkbad, Amsterdam; Referees: Nikolett Sajben (HUN), Ralf Mueller (GER)
15 February 2025; 18:00	Report	Score by quarters: 4–4, 3–1, 3–1, 1–4			Het Sloterparkbad, Amsterdam; Referees: Nikolett Sajben (HUN), Ralf Mueller (GER)
15 February 2025; 18:00	Report	five players 2	Goals	Tzortzakaki 3	Het Sloterparkbad, Amsterdam; Referees: Nikolett Sajben (HUN), Ralf Mueller (GER)

ZV De Zaan won 20–16 on aggregate

=== Final ===
Team 1	Agg.	Team 2	1st leg	2nd leg
Pallanuoto Trieste (Italy)	16–24	(Netherlands) ZV De Zaan	9–10	7–14

==== Matches ====
15 March 2025; 18:00	Report	Pallanuoto Trieste (Italy)	9–10	(Netherlands) ZV De Zaan	Bruno Bianchi Swimming Center, Trieste; Attendance: 500
15 March 2025; 18:00	Report	Score by quarters: 2–5, 4–2, 2–2, 1–1			Bruno Bianchi Swimming Center, Trieste; Attendance: 500
15 March 2025; 18:00	Report	Gragnolati 4	Goals	Drewes 3	Bruno Bianchi Swimming Center, Trieste; Attendance: 500

5 April 2025; 20:30	Report	ZV De Zaan (Netherlands)	14–7	(Italy) Pallanuoto Trieste	Het Sloterparkbad, Amsterdam; Attendance: 700; Referees: Nora Debreceni (HUN), Maria Daskalopoulou (GRE)
5 April 2025; 20:30	Report	Score by quarters: 3–2, 3–3, 5–0, 3–2			Het Sloterparkbad, Amsterdam; Attendance: 700; Referees: Nora Debreceni (HUN), Maria Daskalopoulou (GRE)
5 April 2025; 20:30	Report	Sam 4	Goals	De March, Gant 2	Het Sloterparkbad, Amsterdam; Attendance: 700; Referees: Nora Debreceni (HUN), Maria Daskalopoulou (GRE)

ZV De Zaan won 24–16 on aggregate

2024–25 LEN Women's Euro Cup Champions

ZV De Zaan
First title

== See also ==
- 2024–25 European Aquatics Champions League
- 2024–25 European Aquatics Euro Cup
- 2024–25 European Aquatics Challenger Cup
- 2024 European Aquatics Super Cup
- 2024–25 European Aquatics Women's Champions League
- 2024–25 European Aquatics Women's Challenger Cup
- 2024 European Aquatics Women's Super Cup
