= 2024–25 European Aquatics Challenger Cup =

Water polo sports season

European Aquatics Challenger Cup
- 2024–25

Tournament information
- Sport: Water polo
- Dates: Qualification round: 1–3 November 2024; Knockout stage: 18 January–26 April 2025
- Teams: Total: 16 (from 12 countries)
- Website: Official website

Final positions
- Champions: (Netherlands) GZC Donk (1st title)
- Runner-up: (Lithuania) EVK Zaibas

Tournament statistics
- Matches played: 38
- Goals scored: 936 (24.63 per match)

The 2024–25 European Aquatics Challenger Cup was the 3rd edition of a water polo competition organised by European Aquatics. It acts as the third tier, below the LEN Champions League and the LEN Euro Cup. The reigning champions are Galatasaray, but they won't defend their title as they didn't enter.

This is the last season where the Challenger Cup is the third tier tournament in European water polo, with the Conference Cup taking its place.

Dutch side, GZC Donk, won their first title after defeating Lithuanian team, EVK Zaibas, in the final.

== Format ==
16 teams are grouped into 4 pools of four clubs. The top 2 from every pool advances to the quarter-finals, followed by semi-finals and finals.

== Rankings ==
Only teams below the top 12 can enter this competition.

Rank	Association	Points	Teams
1	Italy	110,260	0
2	Hungary	84,492.5	0
3	Spain	71,732.5	0
4	Serbia	69,815	0
5	Greece	68,857.5	0
6	Croatia	57,210	0
7	France	45,620	0
8	Germany	33,042.5	0
9	Romania	17,087.5	0
10	Montenegro	14,977.5	0
11	(Georgia (country)) Georgia	12,407.5	0
12	Turkey	7,245	0
13	Russia	5,162.5	0
14	Switzerland	3,685	1
15	Netherlands	3,280	2

Rank	Association	Points	Teams
16	Slovakia	3,180	1
17	Portugal	2,972.5	2
18	Slovenia	2,960	1
19	Lithuania	1,877.5	1
20	Bosnia and Herzegovina	1,790	0
21	(United Kingdom) Great Britain	1,720	1
22	Belgium	1,310	1
23	Malta	1,310	1
24	Israel	860	2
25	Denmark	560	0
26	Finland	560	1
27	Bulgaria	370	0
28	Cyprus	370	2
29	Poland	317.5	0

== Teams ==
No countries ranked in the top 12 of the LEN men's club rankings can take part in this tournament.

Participating teams
(Belgium) Royal Dauphins Mouscronnois	(Cyprus) APOEL Nicosia	(Cyprus) Limassol NC	(Finland) Cetus Espoo
(United Kingdom) Welsh Wanderers	(Israel) ASA Tel Aviv	(Israel) Hapoel Palram Zvulun	(Lithuania) EVK Zaibas
(Malta) Sliema ASC	(Netherlands) GZC Donk	(Netherlands) ZV De Zaan	(Portugal) Vitória Sport Clube
(Portugal) Clube Fluvial Portuense	(Slovakia) KVP Novaky	(Slovenia) AVK Slovan Olimpija	(Switzerland) Carouge Natation

== Schedule ==
=== Rounds and dates ===
Phase	Round	Round date
Qualification round		1–3 November 2024
Quarter-finals	First leg	18 January 2025
Quarter-finals	Second leg	1 February 2025
Semi-finals	First leg	22 February 2025
Semi-finals	Second leg	8 March 2025
Final	First leg	12 April 2025
Final	Second leg	26 April 2025

== Qualification round ==
In the qualification round, teams play in a round robin format. The top 2 in each group advance. Due to the lack of clubs wanting the host the groups, Nováky and Sliema hosted two groups.

=== Draw ===
The draw was on 16 September 2024. H indicates which club is hosting the groups. Teams in bold advanced to the quarter-finals. The seeding was decided by as follows:

- LEN club rankings.
- LEN country club rankings.
- LEN men's national team rankings.

Pot 1	Pot 2	Pot 3	Pot 4
(Switzerland) Carouge Natation (Lithuania) **EVK Zaibas** (Slovakia) **KVP Novaky** **(H)** (Portugal) **Vitória Sport Clube**	(Belgium) Royal Dauphins Mouscronnois (Netherlands) **ZV De Zaan** (Israel) ASA Tel Aviv (Finland) Cetus Espoo	(Portugal) **Clube Fluvial Portuense** (Cyprus) APOEL Nicosia (Netherlands) **GZC Donk** (Slovenia) **AVK Slovan Olimpija**	(United Kingdom) Welsh Wanderers (Malta) **Sliema ASC** **(H)** (Israel) Hapoel Palram Zvulun (Cyprus) Limassol NC

=== Group A ===
Held in Sliema, Malta

Pos	Team	Pld	W	PSW	PSL	L	GF	GA	GD	Pts	Qualification	(Netherlands) DON	(Portugal) VIT	(Finland) CET	(United Kingdom) WEL
1	(Netherlands) GZC Donk	3	3	0	0	0	58	31	+27	**9**	Quarterfinals	—	15–12	—	—
2	(Portugal) Vitória Sport Clube	3	2	0	0	1	50	31	+19	**6**	Quarterfinals	—	—	13–10	25–6
3	(Finland) Cetus Espoo	3	1	0	0	2	43	41	+2	**3**		8–17	—	—	25–11
4	(United Kingdom) Welsh Wanderers	3	0	0	0	3	28	76	−48	**0**		11–26	—	—	—

Source: European Aquatics

1 November 2024; 16:00	Report	**Cetus Espoo** (Finland)	**25**–11	(United Kingdom) Welsh Wanderers	National Pool, Sliema; Referees: Riccardo Carmignani (ITA), Povilas Sriubas (LTU)
1 November 2024; 16:00	Report	Score by quarters: **6**–2, **8**–2, **5**–4, **6**–3			National Pool, Sliema; Referees: Riccardo Carmignani (ITA), Povilas Sriubas (LTU)
1 November 2024; 16:00	Report	Porobic 6	**Goals**	three players 2	National Pool, Sliema; Referees: Riccardo Carmignani (ITA), Povilas Sriubas (LTU)

1 November 2024; 17:15	Report	**GZC Donk** (Netherlands)	**15**–12	(Portugal) Vitória Sport Clube	National Pool, Sliema; Referees: Erkan Turkkan (TUR), Neville Mercieca (MLT)
1 November 2024; 17:15	Report	Score by quarters: **3**–1, 3–**4**, **6**–4, 3–3			National Pool, Sliema; Referees: Erkan Turkkan (TUR), Neville Mercieca (MLT)
1 November 2024; 17:15	Report	Veenhuis 4	**Goals**	Ramos 5	National Pool, Sliema; Referees: Erkan Turkkan (TUR), Neville Mercieca (MLT)

2 November 2024; 16:00	Report	**Vitória Sport Clube** (Portugal)	**13**–10	(Finland) Cetus Espoo	National Pool, Sliema; Referees: Riccardo Carmignani (ITA), Erkan Turkkan (TUR)
2 November 2024; 16:00	Report	Score by quarters: 1–**3**, 2–2, **4**–1, **6**–4			National Pool, Sliema; Referees: Riccardo Carmignani (ITA), Erkan Turkkan (TUR)
2 November 2024; 16:00	Report	Ramos 6	**Goals**	Porobic 3	National Pool, Sliema; Referees: Riccardo Carmignani (ITA), Erkan Turkkan (TUR)

2 November 2024; 17:15	Report	Welsh Wanderers (United Kingdom)	11–**26**	(Netherlands) **GZC Donk**	National Pool, Sliema; Referees: Neville Mercieca (MLT), Povilas Sriubas (LTU)
2 November 2024; 17:15	Report	Score by quarters: 5–5, 1–**5**, 2–**8**, 3–**8**			National Pool, Sliema; Referees: Neville Mercieca (MLT), Povilas Sriubas (LTU)
2 November 2024; 17:15	Report	Laxton 6	**Goals**	Van Ijperen 6	National Pool, Sliema; Referees: Neville Mercieca (MLT), Povilas Sriubas (LTU)

3 November 2024; 08:30	Report	Cetus Espoo (Finland)	8–**17**	(Netherlands) **GZC Donk**	National Pool, Sliema; Referees: Riccardo Carmignani (ITA), Povilas Sriubas (LTU)
3 November 2024; 08:30	Report	Score by quarters: 2–**4**, **4**–3, 0–**5**, 2–**5**			National Pool, Sliema; Referees: Riccardo Carmignani (ITA), Povilas Sriubas (LTU)
3 November 2024; 08:30	Report	Porobic, Vavic 2	**Goals**	Veenhuis, Winkelhorst 5	National Pool, Sliema; Referees: Riccardo Carmignani (ITA), Povilas Sriubas (LTU)

3 November 2024; 09:45	Report	**Vitória Sport Clube** (Portugal)	**25**–6	(United Kingdom) Welsh Wanderers	National Pool, Sliema; Referees: Erkan Turkkan (TUR), Neville Mercieca (MLT)
3 November 2024; 09:45	Report	Score by quarters: **8**–1, **7**–2, 3–3, **7**–0			National Pool, Sliema; Referees: Erkan Turkkan (TUR), Neville Mercieca (MLT)
3 November 2024; 09:45	Report	Ferreira Sousa 6	**Goals**	Laxton 4	National Pool, Sliema; Referees: Erkan Turkkan (TUR), Neville Mercieca (MLT)

=== Group B ===
Held in Novaky, Slovakia

Pos	Team	Pld	W	PSW	PSL	L	GF	GA	GD	Pts	Qualification	(Netherlands) ZAAN	(Lithuania) ZAI	(Israel) HAP	(Cyprus) APO
1	(Netherlands) ZV De Zaan	3	3	0	0	0	42	21	+21	**9**	Quarterfinals	—	—	8–7	21–2
2	(Lithuania) EVK Zaibas	3	2	0	0	1	42	30	+12	**6**	Quarterfinals	12–13	—	12–10	18–7
3	(Israel) Hapoel Palram Zvulun	3	1	0	0	2	31	31	0	**3**		—	—	—	14–11
4	(Cyprus) APOEL Nicosia	3	0	0	0	3	20	53	−33	**0**		—	—	—	—

Source: European Aquatics

1 November 2024; 15:30	Report	**ZV De Zaan** (Netherlands)	**8**–7	(Israel) Hapoel Palram Zvulun	National Water Polo Centre, Nováky; Referees: Robert Prelovsky (SVK), Roberto Guarnieri (BEL)
1 November 2024; 15:30	Report	Score by quarters: 1–1, **2**–1, **4**–3, 1–**2**			National Water Polo Centre, Nováky; Referees: Robert Prelovsky (SVK), Roberto Guarnieri (BEL)
1 November 2024; 15:30	Report	Bakker 3	**Goals**	Begin 3	National Water Polo Centre, Nováky; Referees: Robert Prelovsky (SVK), Roberto Guarnieri (BEL)

1 November 2024; 17:15	Report	**EVK Zaibas** (Lithuania)	**18**–7	(Cyprus) APOEL Nicosia	National Water Polo Centre, Nováky; Referees: Branimir Butigan (BIH), Koppany Toth (HUN)
1 November 2024; 17:15	Report	Score by quarters: **5**–0, **4**–2, **4**–1, **5**–4			National Water Polo Centre, Nováky; Referees: Branimir Butigan (BIH), Koppany Toth (HUN)
1 November 2024; 17:15	Report	Gostautas 5	**Goals**	Konstantopoulos 3	National Water Polo Centre, Nováky; Referees: Branimir Butigan (BIH), Koppany Toth (HUN)

2 November 2024; 19:00	Report	EVK Zaibas (Lithuania)	12–**13**	(Netherlands) **ZV De Zaan**	National Water Polo Centre, Nováky; Referees: Roberto Guarnieri (BEL), Branimir Butigan (BIH)
2 November 2024; 19:00	Report	Score by quarters: 2–**3**, 4–**5**, 2–2, **4**–3			National Water Polo Centre, Nováky; Referees: Roberto Guarnieri (BEL), Branimir Butigan (BIH)
2 November 2024; 19:00	Report	Jelaca 3	**Goals**	Rempt 3	National Water Polo Centre, Nováky; Referees: Roberto Guarnieri (BEL), Branimir Butigan (BIH)

2 November 2024; 20:45	Report	**Hapoel Palram Zvulun** (Israel)	**14**–11	(Cyprus) APOEL Nicosia	National Water Polo Centre, Nováky; Referees: Robert Prelovsky (SVK), Koppany Toth (HUN)
2 November 2024; 20:45	Report	Score by quarters: **5**–1, 3–3, **4**–2, 2–**5**			National Water Polo Centre, Nováky; Referees: Robert Prelovsky (SVK), Koppany Toth (HUN)
2 November 2024; 20:45	Report	Goldschmidt 4	**Goals**	three players 2	National Water Polo Centre, Nováky; Referees: Robert Prelovsky (SVK), Koppany Toth (HUN)

3 November 2024; 09:00	Report	**ZV De Zaan** (Netherlands)	**21**–2	(Cyprus) APOEL Nicosia	National Water Polo Centre, Nováky; Referees: Koppany Toth (HUN), Roberto Guarnieri (BEL)
3 November 2024; 09:00	Report	Score by quarters: **7**–0, **4**–1, **5**–0, **5**–1			National Water Polo Centre, Nováky; Referees: Koppany Toth (HUN), Roberto Guarnieri (BEL)
3 November 2024; 09:00	Report	Van Den Dobbelsteen 6	**Goals**	Economides, Robu 1	National Water Polo Centre, Nováky; Referees: Koppany Toth (HUN), Roberto Guarnieri (BEL)

3 November 2024; 10:45	Report	**EVK Zaibas** (Lithuania)	**12**–10	(Israel) Hapoel Palram Zvulun	National Water Polo Centre, Nováky; Referees: Branimir Butigan (BIH), Robert Prelovsky (SVK)
3 November 2024; 10:45	Report	Score by quarters: 2–2, 4–4, **4**–1, 2–**3**			National Water Polo Centre, Nováky; Referees: Branimir Butigan (BIH), Robert Prelovsky (SVK)
3 November 2024; 10:45	Report	Jelaca 3	**Goals**	Begin, Carmon 3	National Water Polo Centre, Nováky; Referees: Branimir Butigan (BIH), Robert Prelovsky (SVK)

=== Group C ===
Held in Sliema, Malta

Pos	Team	Pld	W	PSW	PSL	L	GF	GA	GD	Pts	Qualification	(Malta) SLI	(Portugal) FLU	(Switzerland) CAR	(Israel) ASA
1	(Malta) Sliema ASC (H)	3	3	0	0	0	44	20	+24	**9**	Quarterfinals	—	15–7	16–5	13–8
2	(Portugal) Clube Fluvial Portuense	3	2	0	0	1	33	32	+1	**6**	Quarterfinals	—	—	—	14–8
3	(Switzerland) Carouge Natation	3	1	0	0	2	32	35	−3	**3**		—	9–12	—	—
4	(Israel) ASA Tel Aviv	3	0	0	0	3	23	45	−22	**0**		—	—	7–18	—

Source: European Aquatics
(H) Host

1 November 2024; 18:30	Report	Carouge Natation (Switzerland)	9–**12**	(Portugal) **Clube Fluvial Portuense**	National Pool, Sliema; Referees: Robert Horvath (SVK), Maxim Gerasimov (GBR)
1 November 2024; 18:30	Report	Score by quarters: **2**–1, 2–**3**, 2–2, 3–**6**			National Pool, Sliema; Referees: Robert Horvath (SVK), Maxim Gerasimov (GBR)
1 November 2024; 18:30	Report	Gros 3	**Goals**	five players 2	National Pool, Sliema; Referees: Robert Horvath (SVK), Maxim Gerasimov (GBR)

1 November 2024; 19:45	Report	**Sliema ASC** (Malta)	**13**–8	(Israel) ASA Tel Aviv	National Pool, Sliema; Referees: Polydoros Filippou (CYP), Rok Vehovec (SLO)
1 November 2024; 19:45	Report	Score by quarters: **5**–0, 2–**3**, 2–**3**, **4**–2			National Pool, Sliema; Referees: Polydoros Filippou (CYP), Rok Vehovec (SLO)
1 November 2024; 19:45	Report	five players 2	**Goals**	three players 2	National Pool, Sliema; Referees: Polydoros Filippou (CYP), Rok Vehovec (SLO)

2 November 2024; 18:30	Report	ASA Tel Aviv (Israel)	7–**18**	(Switzerland) **Carouge Natation**	National Pool, Sliema; Referees: Maxim Gerasimov (GBR), Polydoros Filippou (CYP)
2 November 2024; 18:30	Report	Score by quarters: 2–**4**, 2–**4**, 1–**4**, 2–**6**			National Pool, Sliema; Referees: Maxim Gerasimov (GBR), Polydoros Filippou (CYP)
2 November 2024; 18:30	Report	Kolodny, Souva 2	**Goals**	Roscio 6	National Pool, Sliema; Referees: Maxim Gerasimov (GBR), Polydoros Filippou (CYP)

2 November 2024; 19:45	Report	**Sliema ASC** (Malta)	**15**–7	(Portugal) Clube Fluvial Portuense	National Pool, Sliema; Referees: Rok Vehovec (SLO), Robert Horvath (SVK)
2 November 2024; 19:45	Report	Score by quarters: **3**–1, **5**–3, **1**–0, **6**–3			National Pool, Sliema; Referees: Rok Vehovec (SLO), Robert Horvath (SVK)
2 November 2024; 19:45	Report	Zammit 4	**Goals**	Ornelas Pinto, Parati 2	National Pool, Sliema; Referees: Rok Vehovec (SLO), Robert Horvath (SVK)

3 November 2024; 11:15	Report	**Clube Fluvial Portuense** (Portugal)	**14**–8	(Israel) ASA Tel Aviv	National Pool, Sliema; Referees: Maxim Gerasimov (GBR), Rok Vehovec (SLO)
3 November 2024; 11:15	Report	Score by quarters: 2–2, **5**–0, **5**–3, 2–**3**			National Pool, Sliema; Referees: Maxim Gerasimov (GBR), Rok Vehovec (SLO)
3 November 2024; 11:15	Report	Parati 4	**Goals**	Gal-on, Zonanstern 2	National Pool, Sliema; Referees: Maxim Gerasimov (GBR), Rok Vehovec (SLO)

3 November 2024; 12:30	Report	**Sliema ASC** (Malta)	**16**–5	(Switzerland) Carouge Natation	National Pool, Sliema; Referees: Robert Horvath (SVK), Polydoros Filippou (CYP)
3 November 2024; 12:30	Report	Score by quarters: **5**–2, 2–2, **4**–1, **5**–0			National Pool, Sliema; Referees: Robert Horvath (SVK), Polydoros Filippou (CYP)
3 November 2024; 12:30	Report	Zammit 5	**Goals**	Gros, Melet 2	National Pool, Sliema; Referees: Robert Horvath (SVK), Polydoros Filippou (CYP)

=== Group D ===
Held in Novaky, Slovakia

Pos	Team	Pld	W	PSW	PSL	L	GF	GA	GD	Pts	Qualification	(Slovakia) NOV	(Slovenia) SLO	(Belgium) MOU	(Cyprus) LIM
1	(Slovakia) KVP Novaky (H)	3	3	0	0	0	51	33	+18	**9**	Quarterfinals	—	14–10	18–12	19–11
2	(Slovenia) AVK Slovan Olimpija	3	2	0	0	1	36	33	+3	**6**	Quarterfinals	—	—	14–12	12–7
3	(Belgium) Royal Dauphins Mouscronnois	3	1	0	0	2	43	42	+1	**3**		—	—	—	—
4	(Cyprus) Limassol NC	3	0	0	0	3	28	50	−22	**0**		10–19	—	—	—

Source: European Aquatics
(H) Host

1 November 2024; 19:00	Report	**KVP Novaky** (Slovakia)	**19**–11	(Cyprus) Limassol NC	National Water Polo Centre, Nováky; Referees: Luis Alves (POR), Tal Shildan (ISR)
1 November 2024; 19:00	Report	Score by quarters: **5**–1, 2–**3**, **7**–4, **5**–3			National Water Polo Centre, Nováky; Referees: Luis Alves (POR), Tal Shildan (ISR)
1 November 2024; 19:00	Report	three players 4	**Goals**	Chalaris 5	National Water Polo Centre, Nováky; Referees: Luis Alves (POR), Tal Shildan (ISR)

1 November 2024; 20:45	Report	**AVK Slovan Olimpija** (Slovenia)	**14**–12	(Belgium) Royal Dauphins Mouscronnois	National Water Polo Centre, Nováky; Referees: Massimo Castrilli (SUI), Jarkko Virtanen (FIN)
1 November 2024; 20:45	Report	Score by quarters: **4**–3, **3**–2, 4–4, 3–3			National Water Polo Centre, Nováky; Referees: Massimo Castrilli (SUI), Jarkko Virtanen (FIN)
1 November 2024; 20:45	Report	Potocnik 7	**Goals**	Mikael 5	National Water Polo Centre, Nováky; Referees: Massimo Castrilli (SUI), Jarkko Virtanen (FIN)

2 November 2024; 15:30	Report	**AVK Slovan Olimpija** (Slovenia)	**12**–7	(Cyprus) Limassol NC	National Water Polo Centre, Nováky; Referees: Tal Shildan (ISR), Jarkko Virtanen (FIN)
2 November 2024; 15:30	Report	Score by quarters: 2–**3**, **3**–0, **4**–1, 3–3			National Water Polo Centre, Nováky; Referees: Tal Shildan (ISR), Jarkko Virtanen (FIN)
2 November 2024; 15:30	Report	Canc 4	**Goals**	Monioudis 3	National Water Polo Centre, Nováky; Referees: Tal Shildan (ISR), Jarkko Virtanen (FIN)

2 November 2024; 17:15	Report	**KVP Novaky** (Slovakia)	**18**–12	(Belgium) Royal Dauphins Mouscronnois	National Water Polo Centre, Nováky; Referees: Massimo Castrilli (SUI), Luis Alves (POR)
2 November 2024; 17:15	Report	Score by quarters: **5**–2, 4–4, **4**–3, **5**–3			National Water Polo Centre, Nováky; Referees: Massimo Castrilli (SUI), Luis Alves (POR)
2 November 2024; 17:15	Report	Dittmer, Tisaj 4	**Goals**	Mikael 4	National Water Polo Centre, Nováky; Referees: Massimo Castrilli (SUI), Luis Alves (POR)

3 November 2024; 12:30	Report	Limassol NC (Cyprus)	10–**19**	(Belgium) **Royal Dauphins Mouscronnois**	National Water Polo Centre, Nováky; Referees: Tal Shildan (ISR), Jarkko Virtanen (FIN)
3 November 2024; 12:30	Report	Score by quarters: **5**–4, 1–**6**, 2–**5**, 2–**4**			National Water Polo Centre, Nováky; Referees: Tal Shildan (ISR), Jarkko Virtanen (FIN)
3 November 2024; 12:30	Report	Ioannou, Trusico 2	**Goals**	Grman 5	National Water Polo Centre, Nováky; Referees: Tal Shildan (ISR), Jarkko Virtanen (FIN)

3 November 2024; 14:15	Report	**KVP Novaky** (Slovakia)	**14**–10	(Slovenia) AVK Slovan Olimpija	National Water Polo Centre, Nováky; Referees: Luis Alves (POR), Massimo Castrilli (SUI)
3 November 2024; 14:15	Report	Score by quarters: **5**–3, **2**–1, **4**–2, 3–**4**			National Water Polo Centre, Nováky; Referees: Luis Alves (POR), Massimo Castrilli (SUI)
3 November 2024; 14:15	Report	Tisaj 7	**Goals**	Potocnik 3	National Water Polo Centre, Nováky; Referees: Luis Alves (POR), Massimo Castrilli (SUI)

== Knockout stage ==
=== Draw ===
The draw was on 11 November 2024. The seeded and unseeded clubs consist of the teams that finished first and second in the previous round respectively. The only restriction was that clubs from the same group in the previous round could not be drawn against each other.

Seeded	Unseeded
(Netherlands) GZC Donk (Netherlands) ZV De Zaan (Malta) Sliema ASC (Slovakia) KVP Novaky	(Portugal) Vitória Sport Clube (Lithuania) EVK Zaibas (Portugal) Clube Fluvial Portuense (Slovenia) AVK Slovan Olimpija

=== Bracket ===
Quarterfinals
(Netherlands) ZV De Zaan	23	13	36
(Portugal) Vitória Sport Clube	11	4	15
(Slovakia) KVP Novaky	8	14	22
(Lithuania) EVK Zaibas	16	8	24
(Netherlands) GZC Donk	20	18	38
(Portugal) Clube Fluvial Portuense	12	13	25
(Malta) Sliema ASC	15	13	28
(Slovenia) AVK Slovan Olimpija	8	2	10

Semifinals
(Netherlands) ZV De Zaan	9	11	20
(Lithuania) EVK Zaibas	9	13	22
(Netherlands) GZC Donk	18	12	30
(Malta) Sliema ASC	17	12	29

Final
(Lithuania) EVK Zaibas	13	9	22
(Netherlands) GZC Donk	11	12	23

=== Quarterfinals ===
Team 1	Agg.	Team 2	1st leg	2nd leg
Vitória Sport Clube (Portugal)	15–36	(Netherlands) ZV De Zaan	11–23	4–13
EVK Zaibas (Lithuania)	24–22	(Slovakia) KVP Novaky	16–8	8–14
Clube Fluvial Portuense (Portugal)	25–38 (Note: Order of legs reversed.)	(Netherlands) GZC Donk	20–12	13–18
AVK Slovan Olimpija (Slovenia)	10–28	(Malta) Sliema ASC	8–15	2–13

==== Matches ====
18 January 2025; 17:00	Report	Vitória Sport Clube (Portugal)	11–23	(Netherlands) ZV De Zaan	Guimaraes, Portugal; Referees: Tomi Kavcic (SLO), Jeremie Peden (FRA)
18 January 2025; 17:00	Report	Score by quarters: 3–7, 3–4, 4–7, 1–5			Guimaraes, Portugal; Referees: Tomi Kavcic (SLO), Jeremie Peden (FRA)
18 January 2025; 17:00	Report	Ferreira Sousa, Lopes 3	Goals	Brantjes 4	Guimaraes, Portugal; Referees: Tomi Kavcic (SLO), Jeremie Peden (FRA)

1 February 2025; 20:30	Report	ZV De Zaan (Netherlands)	13–4	(Portugal) Vitória Sport Clube	Het Sloterparkbad, Amsterdam; Referees: Rastko Prlic (SRB), Lukasz Krol (POL)
1 February 2025; 20:30	Report	Score by quarters: 5–2, 4–1, 3–1, 1–0			Het Sloterparkbad, Amsterdam; Referees: Rastko Prlic (SRB), Lukasz Krol (POL)
1 February 2025; 20:30	Report	Janssen, Rempt 3	Goals	four players 1	Het Sloterparkbad, Amsterdam; Referees: Rastko Prlic (SRB), Lukasz Krol (POL)

ZV De Zaan won 36–15 on aggregate

18 January 2025; 19:00	Report	EVK Zaibas (Lithuania)	16–8	(Slovakia) KVP Novaky	Elektrenai, Lithuania; Referees: Manuel Manea (ROU), Berk Gunkut (TUR)
18 January 2025; 19:00	Report	Score by quarters: 4–3, 4–1, 4–4, 4–0			Elektrenai, Lithuania; Referees: Manuel Manea (ROU), Berk Gunkut (TUR)
18 January 2025; 19:00	Report	Bosic, Jelaca 4	Goals	Bielik, Furman 2	Elektrenai, Lithuania; Referees: Manuel Manea (ROU), Berk Gunkut (TUR)

1 February 2025; 17:30	Report	KVP Novaky (Slovakia)	14–8	(Lithuania) EVK Zaibas	National Water Polo Centre, Nováky; Referees: Alex De Raffaele (MLT), Matjaz Homovec (SLO)
1 February 2025; 17:30	Report	Score by quarters: 3–3, 3–1, 4–2, 4–2			National Water Polo Centre, Nováky; Referees: Alex De Raffaele (MLT), Matjaz Homovec (SLO)
1 February 2025; 17:30	Report	Bielk 4	Goals	Krapic 2	National Water Polo Centre, Nováky; Referees: Alex De Raffaele (MLT), Matjaz Homovec (SLO)

EVK Zaibas won 24–22 on aggregate

18 January 2025; 14:00	Report	GZC Donk (Netherlands)	20–12	(Portugal) Clube Fluvial Portuense	Groenhovenbad, Gouda; Referees: Miroslav Mijanovic (MNE), Tomas Kaseta (LTU)
18 January 2025; 14:00	Report	Score by quarters: 5–3, 5–3, 2–2, 8–4			Groenhovenbad, Gouda; Referees: Miroslav Mijanovic (MNE), Tomas Kaseta (LTU)
18 January 2025; 14:00	Report	Veenhuis 5	Goals	three players 2	Groenhovenbad, Gouda; Referees: Miroslav Mijanovic (MNE), Tomas Kaseta (LTU)

1 February 2025; 15:30	Report	Clube Fluvial Portuense (Portugal)	13–18	(Netherlands) GZC Donk	Porto, Portugal; Referees: Bogdan Beljin (SRB), Branimir Butigan (BIH)
1 February 2025; 15:30	Report	Score by quarters: 3–6, 3–6, 1–2, 6–4			Porto, Portugal; Referees: Bogdan Beljin (SRB), Branimir Butigan (BIH)
1 February 2025; 15:30	Report	Mendes Teixeira 3	Goals	Van Den Heuvel 5	Porto, Portugal; Referees: Bogdan Beljin (SRB), Branimir Butigan (BIH)

GZC Donk won 38–25 on aggregate

18 January 2025; 18:00	Report	AVK Slovan Olimpija (Slovenia)	8–15	(Malta) Sliema ASC	Ljubljana, Slovenia
18 January 2025; 18:00	Report	Score by quarters: 2–5, 3–1, 1–4, 2–5			Ljubljana, Slovenia
18 January 2025; 18:00	Report	three players 2	Goals	Galea, Zammit 5	Ljubljana, Slovenia

1 February 2025; 17:30	Report	Sliema ASC (Malta)	13–2	(Slovenia) AVK Slovan Olimpija	National Pool, Sliema; Referees: Ali Tufan Cakirgil (TUR), Ruben Garcia (SUI)
1 February 2025; 17:30	Report	Score by quarters: 2–0, 5–1, 2–1, 4–0			National Pool, Sliema; Referees: Ali Tufan Cakirgil (TUR), Ruben Garcia (SUI)
1 February 2025; 17:30	Report	Galea, Zammit 3	Goals	Policnik 2	National Pool, Sliema; Referees: Ali Tufan Cakirgil (TUR), Ruben Garcia (SUI)

Sliema ASC won 28–10 on aggregate

=== Semifinals ===
Team 1	Agg.	Team 2	1st leg	2nd leg
ZV De Zaan (Netherlands)	20–22	(Lithuania) EVK Zaibas	9–9	11–13
GZC Donk (Netherlands)	30–29	(Malta) Sliema ASC	18–17	12–12

==== Matches ====
22 February 2025; 20:30	Report	ZV De Zaan (Netherlands)	9–9	(Lithuania) EVK Zaibas	Het Sloterparkbad, Amsterdam; Referees: Norbert Ercse (HUN), Gregory Courbin (FRA)
22 February 2025; 20:30	Report	Score by quarters: 2–1, 3–2, 3–4, 1–2			Het Sloterparkbad, Amsterdam; Referees: Norbert Ercse (HUN), Gregory Courbin (FRA)
22 February 2025; 20:30	Report	Rempt 3	Goals	Jonkus, Vitkauskas 2	Het Sloterparkbad, Amsterdam; Referees: Norbert Ercse (HUN), Gregory Courbin (FRA)

8 March 2025; 18:00	Report	EVK Zaibas (Lithuania)	13–11	(Netherlands) ZV De Zaan	Elektrenai, Lithuania; Referees: Arnaldo Petronilli (ITA), Maxim Gerasimov (GBR)
8 March 2025; 18:00	Report	Score by quarters: 3–2, 4–3, '4–3, 2–3			Elektrenai, Lithuania; Referees: Arnaldo Petronilli (ITA), Maxim Gerasimov (GBR)
8 March 2025; 18:00	Report	three players 3	Goals	Janssen 4	Elektrenai, Lithuania; Referees: Arnaldo Petronilli (ITA), Maxim Gerasimov (GBR)

EVK Zaibas won 22–20 on aggregate

22 February 2025; 20:00	Report	GZC Donk (Netherlands)	18–17	(Malta) Sliema ASC	Groenhovenbad, Gouda; Referees: Alex Marquez (ESP), Mihai George Balanescu (ROU)
22 February 2025; 20:00	Report	Score by quarters: 7–3, 1–4, 5–3, 5–7			Groenhovenbad, Gouda; Referees: Alex Marquez (ESP), Mihai George Balanescu (ROU)
22 February 2025; 20:00	Report	Veenhuis 7	Goals	Zammit 5	Groenhovenbad, Gouda; Referees: Alex Marquez (ESP), Mihai George Balanescu (ROU)

8 March 2025; 17:30	Report	Sliema ASC (Malta)	12–12	(Netherlands) GZC Donk	National Pool, Sliema; Referees: Miroslav Mijanovic (MNE), Georgios K. Polychronopoulos (GRE)
8 March 2025; 17:30	Report	Score by quarters: 6–6, 1–1, 3–3, 2–2			National Pool, Sliema; Referees: Miroslav Mijanovic (MNE), Georgios K. Polychronopoulos (GRE)
8 March 2025; 17:30	Report	Schouwerwou 3	Goals	Zammit 3	National Pool, Sliema; Referees: Miroslav Mijanovic (MNE), Georgios K. Polychronopoulos (GRE)

GZC Donk won 30–29 on aggregate

=== Final ===
Team 1	Agg.	Team 2	1st leg	2nd leg
EVK Zaibas (Lithuania)	22–23	(Netherlands) GZC Donk	13–11	9–12

==== Matches ====
12 April 2025; 19:00	Report	EVK Zaibas (Lithuania)	13–11	(Netherlands) GZC Donk	Elektrenai, Lithuania; Referees: Norbert Ercse (HUN), Tomi Kavcic (SLO)
12 April 2025; 19:00	Report	Score by quarters: 2–3, 5–2, 2–2, 4–4			Elektrenai, Lithuania; Referees: Norbert Ercse (HUN), Tomi Kavcic (SLO)
12 April 2025; 19:00	Report	Jelaca 7	Goals	van Ijperen, Winkelhorst	Elektrenai, Lithuania; Referees: Norbert Ercse (HUN), Tomi Kavcic (SLO)

26 April 2025; 14:00	Report	GZC Donk (Netherlands)	12–9	(Lithuania) EVK Zaibas	Groenhovenbad, Gouda; Referees: Pau Segurana (ESP), Daniele Bianco (ITA)
26 April 2025; 14:00	Report	Score by quarters: 2–1, 4–2, 3–3, 3–3			Groenhovenbad, Gouda; Referees: Pau Segurana (ESP), Daniele Bianco (ITA)
26 April 2025; 14:00	Report	van Ijperen 5	Goals	four players 2	Groenhovenbad, Gouda; Referees: Pau Segurana (ESP), Daniele Bianco (ITA)

GZC Donk won 23–22 on aggregate

2024–25 European Aquatics Challenger Cup Champions
(Netherlands)
GZC Donk
First title

== See also ==
- 2024–25 European Aquatics Champions League
- 2024–25 European Aquatics Euro Cup
- 2024 European Aquatics Super Cup
- 2024–25 European Aquatics Women's Champions League
- 2024–25 European Aquatics Women's Euro Cup
- 2024–25 European Aquatics Women's Challenger Cup
- 2024 European Aquatics Women's Super Cup
