= Nováky =

- Municipality
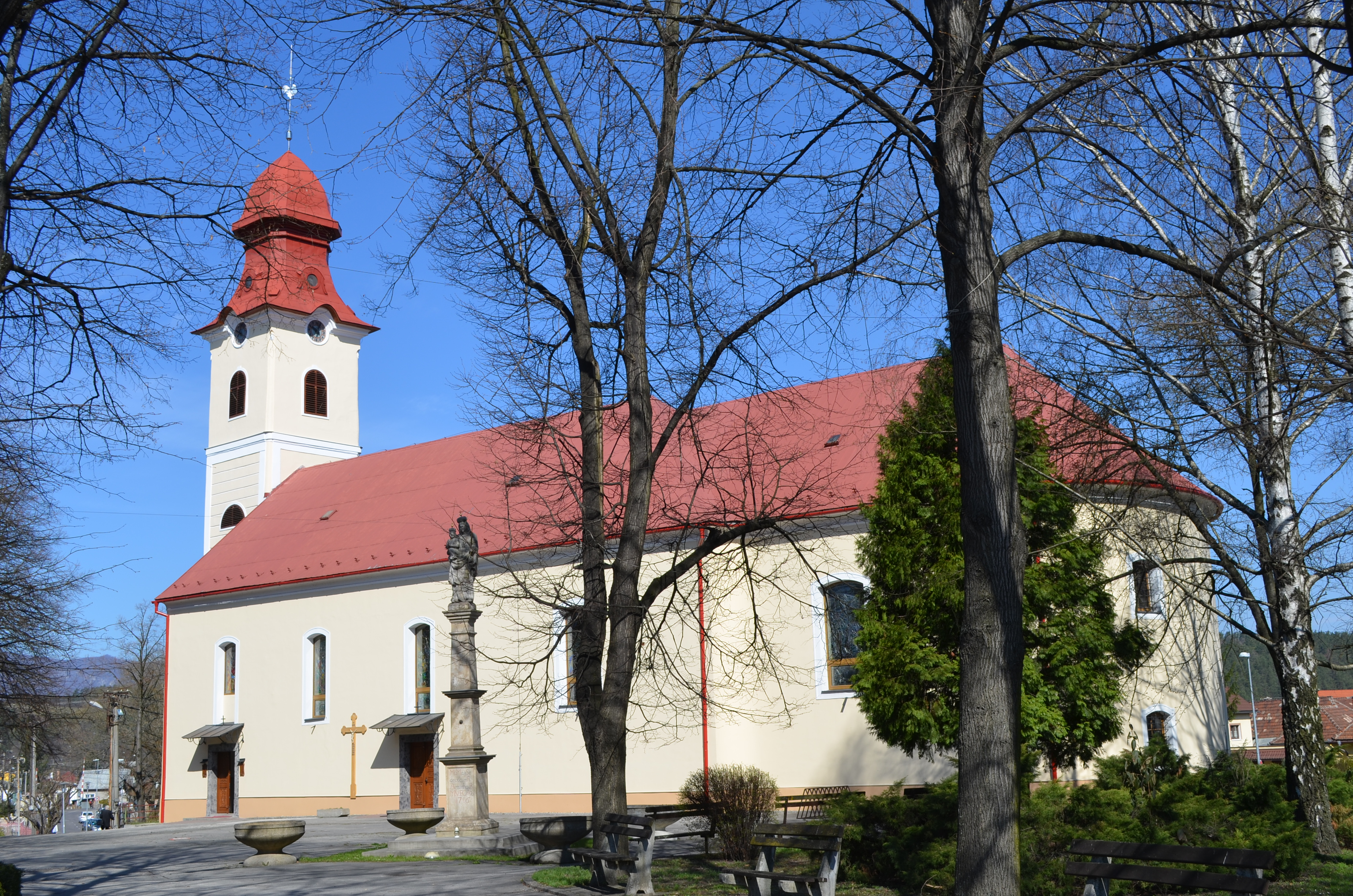
- St. Nicholas Church

- Flag Coat of arms

- Location of Nováky in the Trenčín Region Location of Nováky in Slovakia
- Coordinates: 48.71°N 18.54°E
- Country: Slovakia
- Region: Trenčín Region
- District: Prievidza District
- First mentioned: 1113

Government
  - Mayor: Daniel Daniš

Area
  - Total: 19.37 km^{2} (7.48 sq mi)
- Elevation: 242 m (794 ft)

Population (2025)
  - Total: 4,062
- Time zone: UTC+1 (CET)
  - Summer (DST): UTC+2 (CEST)
- Postal code: 972 71
- Area code: +421 46
- Vehicle registration plate (until 2022): PD
- Website: www.novaky.sk

Nováky (Hungarian: Nyitranovák; German: Anfänger) is a town in the Prievidza District, Trenčín Region in western Slovakia. Nováky Power Plant, a thermal power plant, is located near the town. Until 1920, it was part of the Kingdom of Hungary.

The town is one of the centres of brown coal mining in Slovakia.

== Geography ==
The town is located in the upper Nitra River valley, between the Vtáčnik and Strážovské vrchy ranges, about 10 km (6.21 mi) from Prievidza.

== History ==
The first written record about Nováky was in 1113 as Nuovac.

In 1942, during the reign of the Nazi puppet government of "Independent" Slovakia, nearby barracks were used for the assembly and detention of Slovak Jews from all over the country, pending their deportation to Nazi death camps in German-occupied Poland. The camp was guarded by the Slovak Hlinka Guard militia.

Nováky has had town status since 1961.

== Geography ==
The municipality lies at an altitude of 242 metres (794 ft) and covers an area of 19.37 km^{2} (7.48 sq mi) (2025).

== Population ==
Population statistic (10 years)
Year	1995	2005	2015	2025
Count	4320	4424	4237	4062
Difference		+2.40%	−4.22%	−4.13%

Population statistic
Year	2024	2025
Count	4093	4062
Difference		−0.75%

It has a population of 4062 people (31 December 2025).

=== Ethnicity ===
Census 2021 (1+ %)
Ethnicity	Number	Fraction
Slovak	3930	93.63%
Not found out	238	5.67%
Total	4197	

In year 2021 was 4197 people by ethnicity 3930 as Slovak, 238 as Not found out, 24 as Czech, 18 as Other, 13 as Hungarian, 4 as Ukrainian, 4 as Romani, 4 as Russian, 4 as German, 3 as Italian, 3 as Polish, 3 as English, 2 as Austrian, 1 as Vietnamese, 1 as Rusyn, 1 as Canadian and 1 as Greek.

Note on population: The difference values of population numbers in the table "Population statistic" and in the sections "Ethnicity" & "Religion" is caused by the use of various statistical methods.

=== Religion ===
Census 2021 (1+ %)
Religion	Number	Fraction
Roman Catholic Church	2464	58.71%
None	1292	30.78%
Not found out	270	6.43%
Evangelical Church	51	1.22%
Total	4197	

In year 2021 was 4197 people by religion 2464 from Roman Catholic Church, 1292 from None, 270 from Not found out, 51 from Evangelical Church, 22 from Greek Catholic Church, 19 from Ad hoc movements, 18 from Other, 13 from Christian Congregations in Slovakia, 12 from Calvinist Church, 9 from Eastern Orthodox Church, 7 from Other and not ascertained christian church, 7 from Jehovah's Witnesses, 6 from Buddhism, 4 from United Methodist Church, 2 from Hinduism and 1 from Paganism and natural spirituality.

According to the 2001 census, the town had 4,402 inhabitants. 97.32% of inhabitants were Slovaks, 0.89% Czechs, 0.41 Roma and 0.25% Hungarians. The religious make-up was 75.91% Roman Catholics, 18.06% people with no religious affiliation and 1.57% Lutherans.
