= 2024 European Aquatics Super Cup =

Water polo match

Tournament details
- Arena: Császár-Komjádi Béla Sport Swimming Pool; Budapest, Hungary
- Dates: 5 October 2024

Final positions
- Champions: (Hungary) FTC-Telekom (5th title)
- Runners-up: (Croatia) Jug AO Dubrovnik

Awards and statistics
- Top scorer(s): (Croatia) Marko Žuvela (4 goals)

The 2024 European Aquatics Super Cup was the 42nd edition of the annual trophy organised by European Aquatics and contested by the reigning champions of the two European competitions for men's water polo clubs. The match was played between European champions FTC-Telekom (winners of the 2023–24 LEN Champions League) and Jug AO Dubrovnik (winners of the 2023–24 LEN Euro Cup). The match was held on 5 October. FTC-Telekom won their fifth title with 13–9 win over Jug AO Dubrovnik.

== Teams ==
Team	Qualification	Previous participation (bold indicates winners)
(Hungary) FTC-Telekom	Winners of the 2023–24 LEN Champions League	**1978**, **1980**, 2017, **2018**, **2019**
(Croatia) Jug AO Dubrovnik	Winners of the 2023–24 LEN Euro Cup	1981, **2006**, **2016**

== Venue ==
The venue is the Császár-Komjádi Béla Sport Swimming Pool in Budapest.

2024 European Aquatics Super Cup is located in Hungary	Budapest
2024 European Aquatics Super Cup is located in Hungary	Császár-Komjádi Béla Sport Swimming Pool

== Match ==
5 October; 20:00	Report	**FTC-Telekom** (Hungary)	**13**–9	(Croatia) Jug AO Dubrovnik	Császár-Komjádi Béla Sport Swimming Pool, Budapest; Referees: Raffaele Colombo (ITA), David Gomez (ESP)
5 October; 20:00	Report	Score by quarters: **4**–3, 0–**2**, **5**–1, **4**–3			Császár-Komjádi Béla Sport Swimming Pool, Budapest; Referees: Raffaele Colombo (ITA), David Gomez (ESP)
5 October; 20:00	Report	three players 3	**Goals**	Žuvela 4	Császár-Komjádi Béla Sport Swimming Pool, Budapest; Referees: Raffaele Colombo (ITA), David Gomez (ESP)

2024 European Aquatics Super Cup Champions

**FTC-Telekom**
Fifth title

== See also ==
- 2024–25 European Aquatics Champions League
- 2024–25 European Aquatics Euro Cup
- 2024–25 European Aquatics Challenger Cup
- 2024–25 European Aquatics Women's Champions League
- 2024–25 European Aquatics Women's Euro Cup
- 2024–25 European Aquatics Women's Challenger Cup
- 2024 European Aquatics Women's Super Cup
