= ZV De Zaan =

Dutch water polo club

- Founded: 1893 (ZZC Neptunes)
- League: (Netherlands) Dutch Championship
- Based in: Zaandam
- Arena: De Slag, Zaandam
- Colors
- President: René van Zijl
- Championships: 4 European Cups; 9 Dutch Leagues
- Website: http://www.zvdezaan.nl/

Zaanse Vereniging De Zaan is a Dutch water polo club from Zaandam. Originally established in 1893 as ZZC Neptunes, in 1987 it merged with Kroosduikers, changing its name to ZZC Alliance. In 1912 ZC Nereus was established and in 1995 it merged with Zaanlandse Water Vrienden, changing its name to ZWV Nereus. It took its current name in 2012 after merging with ZZC Alliance. The club is best known for its women's team, which enjoyed its golden era through the 1990s, winning three European Cups and seven national championships between 1989 and 2000.

The new logo is designed by Mark van Westervoort from Studio van Westervoort.

== Titles ==
- Women:
  - LEN Champions' Cup (3):
    - 1990, 1995, 1996
  - Euro Cup (1):
    - 2025
  - Dutch Leagues (9):
    - 1989, 1993, 1994, 1995, 1996, 1997, 2001, 2023, 2024
