= Olympiacos CFP =

Greek multi-sport club based in Piraeus

Olympiacos SFP
- Full name: Olympiacós Sýndesmos Filáthlon Peiraiós (Olympic Association of Fans of Piraeus)
- Nicknames: Thrýlos (Legend); Erythrólefkoi (The Red-Whites); Dafnostefanoménos Éfivos (The laurel-crowned adolescent)
- Founded: 10 March 1925; 101 years ago (Officially)
- Colours: Red, White
- Anthem: Thryle ton Gipedon (Legend of Stadiums)
- Chairman: Michalis Kountouris
- Club titles: Ιntercontinental Titles: 1 European Titles: 24; Balkan Titles: 2
- Website: www.olympiacossfp.gr

Olympiacós Sýndesmos Filáthlon Peiraiós (Greek: Ολυμπιακός Σύνδεσμος Φιλάθλων Πειραιώς, lit. 'Olympic Association of Friends-of-sports of Piraeus') is a major multi-sport club based in Piraeus, Greece. Founded on 16 May 1924 and officially recognized on 10 March 1925, Olympiacos is parent to a number of different competitive departments which participate in football, basketball, volleyball, water polo, handball, athletics, swimming, table tennis and boxing amongst many others—and have won numerous European and domestic titles over the club's history. Olympiacos has also completed various doubles, trebles and quadruples.

Nicknamed Thrylos (Legend) and Gavros (Anchovy), Olympiacos SFP is traditionally considered an anti-systemic club representing the working classes of Piraeus and fighting against the system and Athenian aristocracy represented by Panathinaikos.

Olympiacos is the most successful and decorated multi-sports club in Europe, having surpassed Barcelona in 2024 and being the only Greek club, as well as one of the few European multi-sport clubs to have won as many as 27 International titles –including 24 major European titles, 1 Intercontinental title and 2 Balkan titles– in six sports (Football, Basketball, Volleyball, Water Polo, Wrestling, Table Tennis) (no other Greek club have won more than ten European titles). Additionally, by also counting all friendly tournaments and minor and unofficial titles, Olympiacos had 700 trophies in 1962, which have increased since then. Overall, Olympiacos is the most successful Greek multi-sport club in terms of International titles won (27), European titles won (24), European Championships won (11), participations in European and International finals (54) and the only Greek multi-sport club to have won European titles in four different team sports (football, basketball, volleyball, water polo). They have won European titles with nine of their sports departments (men's football, youth football, men's basketball, men's volleyball, women's volleyball, men's water polo, women's water polo, men's wrestling, men's table tennis) while no other multi-sport club in Greece has more than three European title-winning sports departments.

Specifically, Olympiacos Men's Football Team have won 1 UEFA Europa Conference League (2024) and 1 Balkans Cup (1963), Olympiacos Youth Football Team have won 1 UEFA Youth League (2024), Olympiacos Men's Basketball Team have won 4 EuroLeagues (1997, 2012, 2013, 2026) and 1 FIBA Intercontinental Cup (2013), Olympiacos Men's Volleyball Team have won 2 CEV Cups (1996, 2005) and 1 CEV Challenge Cup (2023), Olympiacos Women's Volleyball Team have won 1 CEV Challenge Cup (2018) and 1 BVA Cup (2026), Olympiacos Men's Water Polo Team have won 2 LEN Champions Leagues (2002, 2018) and 1 LEN Super Cup (2002), Olympiacos Women's Water Polo Team have won 4 LEN Champions Leagues (2015, 2021, 2022, 2026), 1 LEN Trophy (2014) and 4 LEN Super Cups (2015, 2021, 2022, 2026), Olympiacos Men's Wrestling Team has won 1 CELA Cup (2006) and Olympiacos Men's Table Tennis Team have won 1 ETTU Europe Trophy (2023). In total, Olympiacos departments (Football, Basketball, Volleyball, Water Polo, Handball, Wrestling, Table Tennis) have reached 54 times the final of the most prestigious and important European and Worldwide competitions, which is an all-time record for a Greek multi-sport club.

Olympiacos FC is also the only club in European football to have won two UEFA trophies in a single season, having won the UEFA Europa Conference League title with its Senior Team and the UEFA Youth League title with its Youth Team in the same year (2024).

Olympiacos is the most popular Greek club with around four million fans inside Greece and millions of others in the Greek communities all over the world. As of April 2006, Olympiacos has 83,000 registered members and is placed in the top ten of the clubs with the most paying members in the world, holding the ninth place just ahead of Real Madrid. In 2014, that figure increased and the team boasts 98,000 registered members. Olympiacos CFP was the first Greek club that made it possible for its fans to become members, and granted them the right of voting for the board of directors.

== History ==
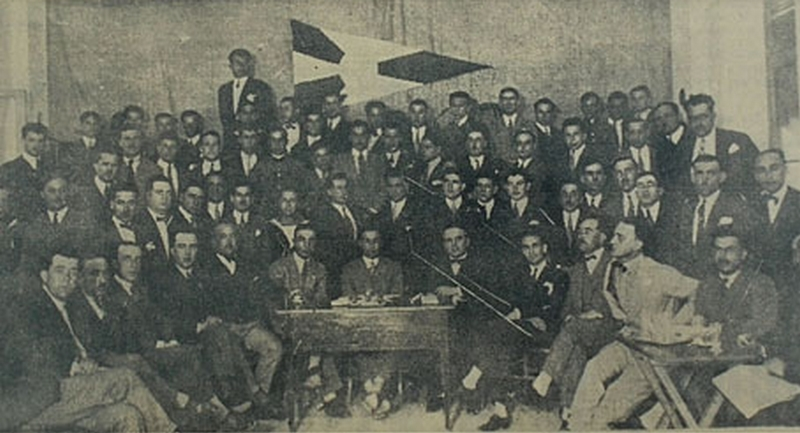
The founders of Olympiacos (1925)

Olympiacos CFP was founded on 16 May 1924, and played some friendly games with other clubs, although it was officially recognized on March 10, 1925. It was founded in Piraeus, as a football club initially, and the club's aim, as stated in the statutes, is the systematic cultivation and development of its athletes' possibilities for participation in athletic competitions, the spreading of the Olympic athletic ideal and the promotion of sportsmanship and fanship among the youth according to egalitarian principles, by stressing a healthy, ethical and social basis as its foundation. Members of "Piraikos Podosfairikos Omilos FC" (Sport and Football Club of Piraeus) and "Piraeus Fans Club FC" decided, during a historical assembly, to dissolve the two clubs in order to establish a new unified one, which would bring this new vision and dynamic to the community. Notis Kamperos, a senior officer of the Hellenic Air Force, proposed the name Olympiacos and the profile of a laurel-crowned Olympic winner as the emblem of the new club. Michalis Manouskos, a prominent Piraeus industrialist, expanded the name to its complete and current status, Olympiacos Syndesmos Filathlon Pireos, a name that symbolizes and encompasses the morality, the honour, the vying, the splendor, the sportsmanship and the fair play value of the Olympic ideal of Ancient Greece, which was totally consistent with the club's emblem. Besides Kamperos and Manouskos, among the most notable founding members were Stavros Maragoudakis, the Post Office director, Nikos Andronikos, a merchant, Dimitrios Sklias, a Hellenic Army officer, Nikolaos Zacharias, an attorney, Athanasios Mermigas, a notary public, Kostas Klidouchakis, who became the first goalkeeper in the club's history, Ioannis Kekkes, a stockbroker, and above all, the Andrianopoulos family. Andrianopoulos, a family of well-established Piraeus merchants, played a pivotal role in the founding of Olympiacos. The five brothers, Yiannis, Giorgos, Dinos, Vassilis and Leonidas Andrianopoulos raised the reputation of the club and brought it to its current glory. Yiannis, Giorgos, Dinos and Vassilis were the first to play, while Leonidas, the youngest of the five, made his debut later on and played for the club for eight years (1927–1935). The club's offensive line, made up of the five brothers, became legendary, rising to a mythical status and soon Olympiacos gained enormous popularity and became the most successful and well-supported club in Greece. Olympiacos is also known as Thrylos (The Legend), after the legendary, classic side of the 1950s which won a hatful of titles.

In 2011, Olympiacos also founded a women's football department, which was refounded in 2025 and currently participates in the Women's Beta Ethniki.

== Olympiacos departments – history and honours ==
A newspaper article from 27-3-1962 which covers the fact that Olympiacos had amassed 700 trophies.

=== Team sports ===
Source:

=== Football ===
The UEFA Europa Conference League trophy won by Olympiacos in the 2023–24 season.

The UEFA Youth League trophy won by Olympiacos U-19 in the 2023–24 season.

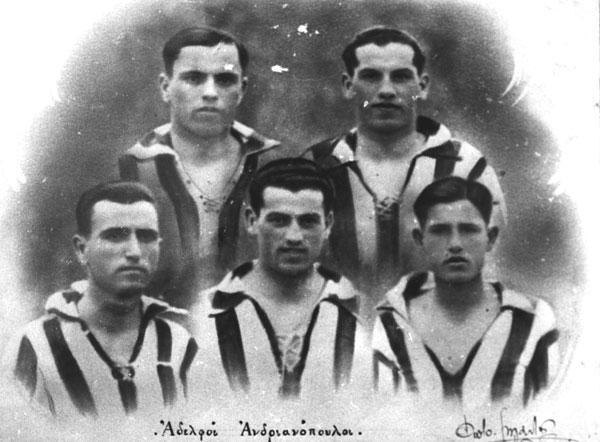
The legendary Andrianopoulos brothers: (from left) Yiannis, Dinos, Giorgos, Vassilis and Leonidas Andrianopoulos

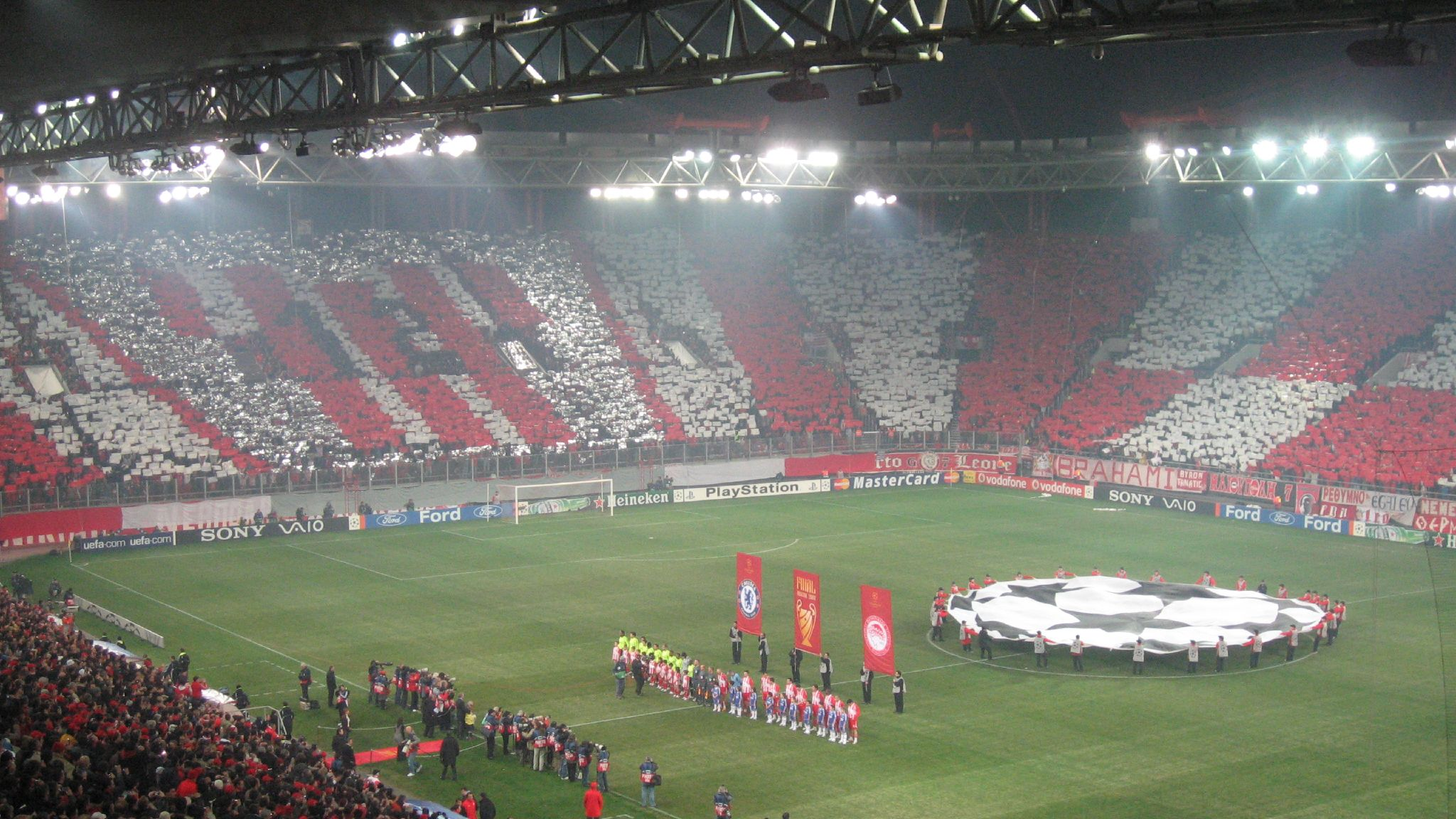
Georgios Karaiskakis Stadium

Olympiacos football team are the most successful club in Greek football history, and the only Greek club to have won a major European trophy by winning the UEFA Europa Conference League in 2024. They have also won 48 League titles, 29 Cups and 5 Super Cups, all records. Totalling 82 national trophies, Olympiacos was 9th in the world in total titles won by a football club in 2018. The club's dominating success can be further evidenced by the fact that all other Greek clubs have won a combined total of 38 League titles, while Olympiacos also holds the record for the most consecutive Greek League titles won, with seven in a row in two occasions (1997–2003 and 2011–2017), breaking their own previous record of six consecutive wins in the 1950s (1954–1959), when Olympiacos was unequivocally nicknamed Thrylos (Greek: Θρύλος, "The Legend").

Having won the 2014–15 league title, Olympiacos became the only football club in the world to have won a series of five or more consecutive championships for five times in their history, a record that was praised by FIFA with a congratulatory letter of its president, Sepp Blatter. They are also the only Greek club to have won five consecutive national Cups (1957–1961), as well as six League titles undefeated (1937, 1938, 1948, 1951, 1954, 1955). Olympiacos are one of only three clubs to have never been relegated from the top flight of Greek football, and by winning the 2012–13 title, their 40th in total, they added a fourth star above their crest, each one representing 10 League titles.

Olympiacos is the most successful Greek football club in European competitions, being the only club from Greece to have won a major European trophy; they won the UEFA Europa Conference League in 2023–24, sealing the title by beating Italian side Fiorentina 1–0 in the Final. With their 2024 triumph, they became the first club outside the biggest four European leagues (Premier League, Serie A, La Liga and Bundesliga) to win a UEFA competition since 2011.

- UEFA Europa Conference League
  - Winners (1) (shared European record): 2024
- UEFA Youth League
  - Winners (1) (Greek record): 2024
- Balkans Cup
  - Winners (1) (Greek record): 1963
- Greek Championship
  - Winners (48) (record): 1930–31, 1932–33, 1933–34, 1935–36, 1936–37, 1937–38, 1946–47, 1947–48, 1950–51, 1953–54, 1954–55, 1955–56, 1956–57, 1957–58, 1958–59, 1965–66, 1966–67, 1972–73, 1973–74, 1974–75, 1979–80, 1980–81, 1981–82, 1982–83, 1986–87, 1996–97, 1997–98, 1998–99, 1999–2000, 2000–01, 2001–02, 2002–03, 2004–05, 2005–06, 2006–07, 2007–08, 2008–09, 2010–11, 2011–12, 2012–13, 2013–14, 2014–15, 2015–16, 2016–17, 2019–20, 2020–21, 2021–22, 2024–25
- Greek Cup
  - Winners (29) (record): 1946–47, 1950–51, 1951–52, 1952–53, 1953–54, 1956–57, 1957–58, 1958–59, 1959–60, 1960–61, 1962–63, 1964–65, 1967–68, 1970–71, 1972–73, 1974–75, 1980–81, 1989–90, 1991–92, 1998–99, 2004–05, 2005–06, 2007–08, 2008–09, 2011–12, 2012–13, 2014–15, 2019–20, 2024–25
- Greek Super Cup
  - Winners (5) (record): 1980, 1987, 1992, 2007, 2025
- Greater Greece Cup
  - Winners (3) (record): 1969, 1972, 1976

=== Basketball ===
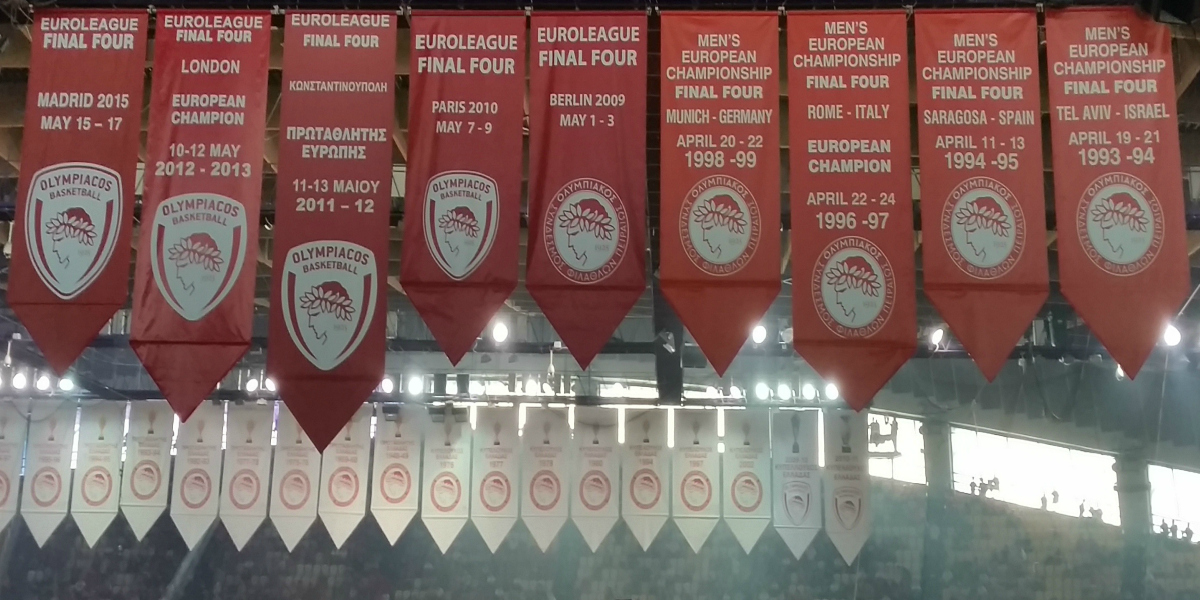
Olympiacos European banners in SEF—4 Euroleague Championships, 10 Euroleague Finals, 15 Euroleague Final Fours

Olympiacos men's basketball team are one of the most successful clubs in European basketball, having won four Euroleague Championships, one Triple Crown, one Intercontinental Cup, sixteen Greek Championships, twelve Greek Cups and five Greek Super Cups. As a traditional European powerhouse, Olympiacos have also been six times EuroLeague runners-up and, having played a total of ten finals, they are the Greek club with the most EuroLeague Final appearances. They have also participated in fourteen EuroLeague Final Fours. They play their home matches at Peace and Friendship Stadium.

They are the first Greek club that ever played in a Euroleague Final (1994), and they won their first Euroleague title in 1997, achieving the first Triple Crown ever for a Greek team. As European champions, Olympiacos played in the 1997 McDonald's Championship and reached the final of the tournament, where they met Michael Jordan's NBA champions, the Chicago Bulls. During the 1990s, besides their constant achievements in EuroLeague, also adding a third place in 1999, Olympiacos dominated the Greek Basket League with five consecutive titles, at a time when the Greek championship was considered Europe's best national basketball league. Thus, FIBA declared Olympiacos as the "Best European Team of the 1990s".

Olympiacos returned to the very top of European basketball in 2010, when they reached the final against Barcelona in Paris, but mostly in 2012, when they won their second EuroLeague title in Istanbul, by rallying from 19 points down in the championship game, to beat CSKA Moscow 62–61, on the last shot of the game, achieving the greatest comeback in European basketball finals history, and one of the greatest ever seen in European continental basketball. In 2013, Olympiacos won their third EuroLeague title and became the only Greek club and only the third club in European basketball history to be crowned back-to-back European champions in the modern EuroLeague Final Four era, after beating Real Madrid 100–88 in the London final. Later on, Olympiacos won the Intercontinental Cup, celebrating a third international title in 17 months.

- Intercontinental Cup
  - Winners (1) (shared Greek record): 2013
- European Championship
  - Winners (4): 1997, 2012, 2013, 2026
- Greek Championship
  - Winners (16): 1949, 1960, 1976, 1978, 1993, 1994, 1995, 1996, 1997, 2012, 2015, 2016, 2022, 2023, 2025, 2026
- Greek Cup
  - Winners (12): 1976, 1977, 1978, 1980, 1994, 1997, 2002, 2010, 2011, 2022, 2023, 2024
- Greek Super Cup
  - Winners (5) (record): 2022, 2023, 2024, 2025, 2026

=== Men's volleyball ===
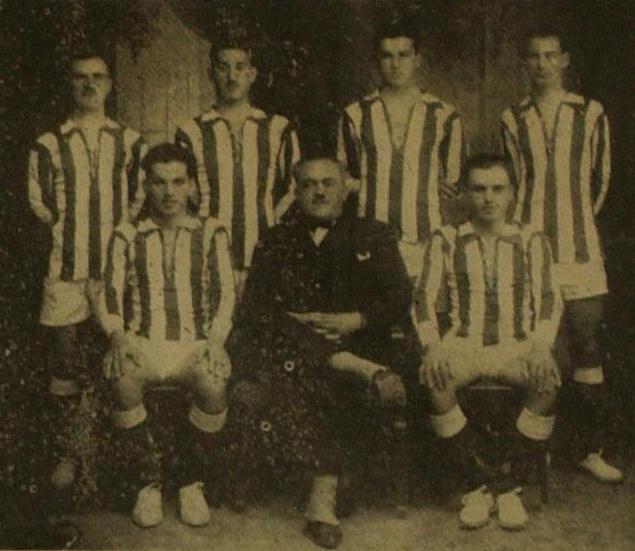
Olympiacos S.C. first team, 1926

Olympiacos men's volleyball team are the most successful club in Greek volleyball history, having won 32 Greek Volley League titles, 19 Cups, 8 League Cups, all national records, and 3 Super Cups. They are the only volleyball club in Greece to have won a European title, having actually won 3 European titles, 2 CEV Cups in 1996 and 2005 and 1 CEV Challenge Cup in 2023. Olympiacos is a traditional powerhouse in European volleyball, having played in 8 European finals in all three main CEV competitions: 2 times runners-up in the CEV Champions League in 1992 and 2002 (with 7 CEV Champions League final four participations), 2 times winners (1996, 2005) and 2 times runners-up (1997, 1998) in the CEV Cup, one-time winners (2023) and one time runners-up (2018) in the CEV Challenge Cup.

Domestically, Olympiacos holds the record for the most consecutive championships won, with eight in a row (1987–1994), and for winning seven championships undefeated (1968, 1974, 1979, 1981, 1988, 1991, 2018). Internationally, their most successful period was between 1992 and 2005, when they came to be included amongst the top volleyball powers in Europe. During this period, apart from their two European trophies, they progressed to eleven final fours in total, seven of them consecutive between 1992 and 1998 (the first four in the CEV Champions League and the next three in the CEV Cup Winners' Cup); they also won a fourth place in the CEV Super Cup and a third in the FIVB Volleyball Men's Club World Championship. Olympiacos came to European prominence again by playing in the 2017–18 CEV Challenge Cup final; at the same time, the women's department won their respective 2017–18 CEV Women's Challenge Cup. In this way, Olympiacos became the first volleyball club that had men and women playing simultaneously in European finals, and one of the very few to have won European trophies in both departments. In 2023, they won the CEV Challenge Cup, beating rivals Panathinaikos in the semi-finals and Maccabi Tel Aviv in the final.

- CEV Cup
  - Winners (2) (Greek record): 1996, 2005
- CEV Challenge Cup
  - Winners (1) (Greek record): 2023
- Greek Championship
  - Winners (32) (record): 1968, 1969, 1974, 1976, 1978, 1979, 1980, 1981, 1983, 1987, 1988, 1989, 1990, 1991, 1992, 1993, 1994, 1998, 1999, 2000, 2001, 2003, 2009, 2010, 2011, 2013, 2014, 2018, 2019, 2021, 2023, 2024
- Greek Cup
  - Winners (19) (record): 1981, 1983, 1989, 1990, 1992, 1993, 1994*, 1997, 1998, 1999, 2001, 2009, 2011, 2013, 2014, 2016, 2017, 2024, 2025
- Greek League Cup
  - Winners (8) (record): 2013, 2015, 2016, 2017, 2018, 2019, 2025, 2026
- Greek Super Cup
  - Winners (4): 2000, 2010, 2024, 2025

Note:
• In 1994, the Greek Cup was cancelled and a final 4 tournament was held in memory of Melina Merkouri. The international players were absent due to the 1994 World Championship. In the final Olympiacos Piraeus defeated Aris Thessaloniki 3–0 to win the title which does count as the cup title for that year according to the Hellenic Volleyball Federation

=== Men's water polo ===
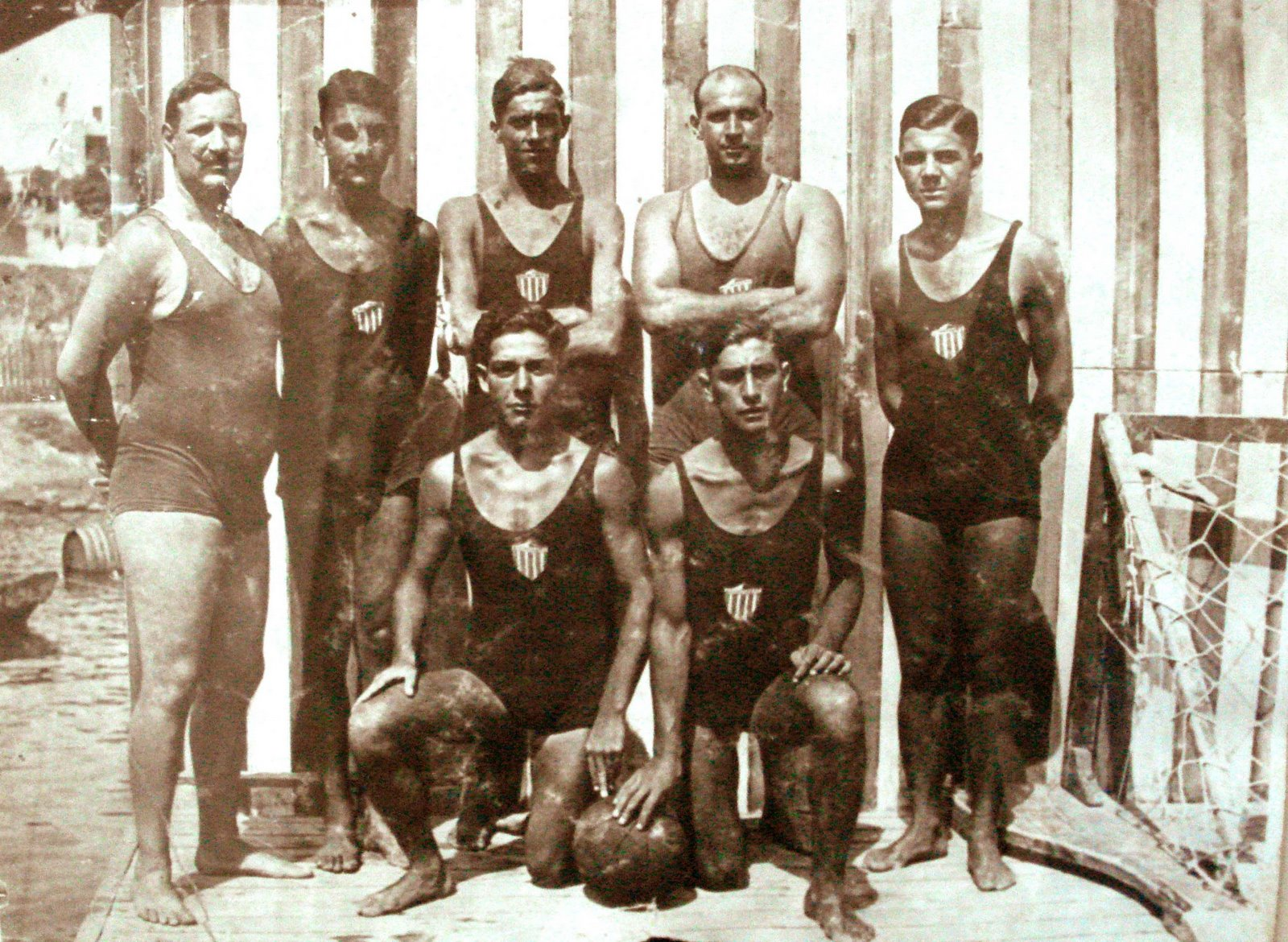
Olympiacos Water Polo team in 1927

Olympiacos men's water polo team is one of the most successful teams in Europe and a traditional powerhouse of continental water polo, having won 2 LEN Champions Leagues (2001–02, 2017–18), 1 LEN Super Cup (2002) and 2 Triple Crowns (2002, 2018), the only Greek club to have been crowned European Champions. They have also been six times runners-up (counting nine European finals overall), three in the LEN Champions League (2000–01, 2015–16, 2018–19), two in the LEN Cup Winners' Cup (1997–98, 1998–99) and one more in the LEN Super Cup (2018). In 2001–02, Olympiacos became the first club ever in water polo history to win all four competitions they claimed (LEN Champions League, LEN Super Cup, Greek League, and Greek Cup), completing a Continental Quadruple. They won their second Continental Quadruple in 2017–18 season (LEN Champions League, Greek League, Greek Cup, Greek Super Cup). After the 2014–15 LEN Euro League win of the women's department, parent club Olympiacos CFP became the second sports club in continental water polo history to have been crowned European Champions with both its men's and women's teams and the only one in Europe with both these departments currently active.

Domestically, Olympiacos is the most titled club in Greek water polo history, as the club's domestic titles are the most out of any Greek club. They have won a record 39 League titles, a record 27 Cups, a record 5 Super Cups, and a record 21 Doubles. They are the dominant force since 1992, having set a number of records including a winning streak of 163 straight wins in both the Greek League's regular season and playoffs, which lasted from May 2013 to May 2019.

- European Championship
  - Winners (2) (Greek record): 2002, 2018
- European Super Cup
  - Winners (1) (Greek record): 2002
- Greek Championship
  - Winners (40) (record): 1927, 1933, 1934, 1936, 1947, 1949, 1951, 1952, 1969, 1971, 1992, 1993, 1995, 1996, 1999, 2000, 2001, 2002, 2003, 2004, 2005, 2007, 2008, 2009, 2010, 2011, 2013, 2014, 2015, 2016, 2017, 2018, 2019, 2020, 2021, 2022, 2023, 2024, 2025, 2026
- Greek Cup
  - Winners (27) (record): 1992, 1993, 1997, 1998, 2001, 2002, 2003, 2004, 2006, 2007, 2008, 2009, 2010, 2011, 2013, 2014, 2015, 2016, 2018, 2019, 2020, 2021, 2022, 2023, 2024, 2025, 2026
- Greek Super Cup
  - Winners (5) (record): 1997, 1998, 2018, 2019, 2020

=== Women's water polo ===
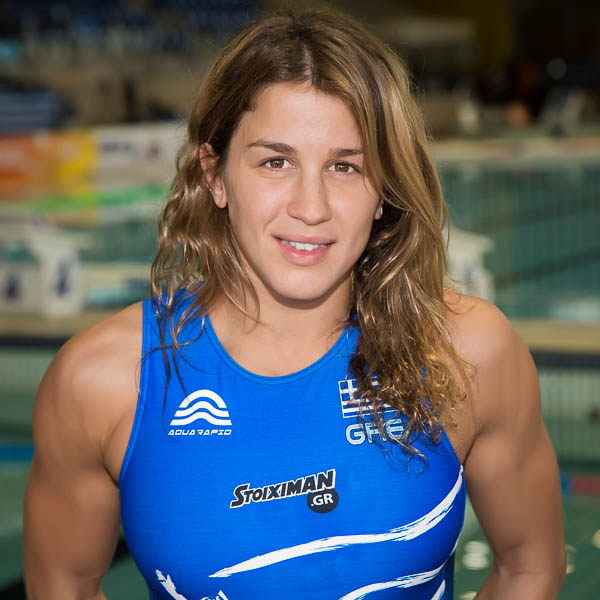
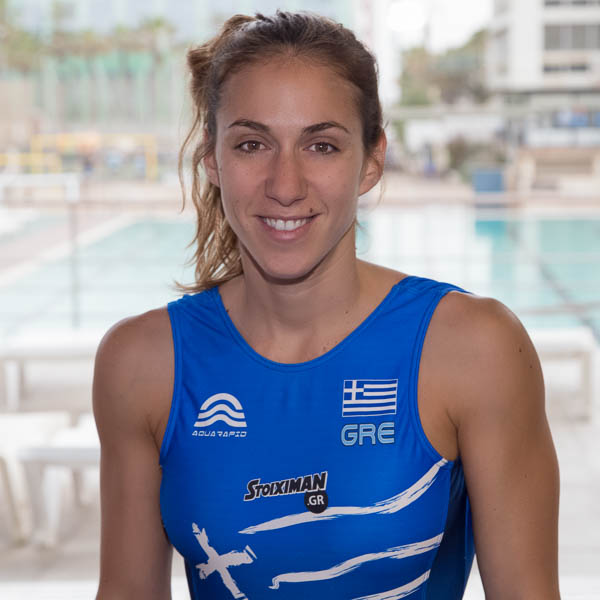
Alexandra Asimaki (left) and Alkisti Avramidou (right), key players of the Olympiacos squad that won the 2015 LEN Euroleague and the 2015 LEN Super Cup

Olympiacos women's water polo team is one of the most successful clubs in Europe and a traditional powerhouse of continental water polo, having won 4 LEN Euro Leagues in 2015, 2021, 2022 and 2026, 4 LEN Super Cups in 2015, 2021, 2022, 2026 and 1 LEN Trophy in 2014 and having, overall, a commanding presence in European competitions. Besides the 4 LEN Euro Leagues, 4 LEN Super Cups and 1 LEN Trophy titles, they were runners-up of the LEN Euro League in 2017 and 2019, runners-up of the LEN Super Cup in 2014, runners-up of the LEN Trophy in 2008 and 2018 and they have participated, altogether, in 12 Champions' Cup / Euro League Final Fours (1996, 2010, 2011, 2015, 2016, 2017, 2019, 2021, 2022, 2024, 2025, 2026), as well as in 5 LEN Trophy Final Fours (2001, 2007, 2008, 2014, 2018), being semi-finalists of the same competition in 2009 and 2012. Domestically, Olympiacos is the most successful Greek club, having won a record 16 Greek Championships, a record 7 Greek Cups, a record 3 Greek Super Cups and a record 5 Doubles. They also hold the all-time record for the most consecutive Greek Championships, as they are the only team to have won 10 consecutive Greek Championship titles (2014–2023).

In 2014 Olympiacos won the LEN Trophy in the Final Four in Florence, beating home team Firenze 10–9 in the final. One year later, Olympiacos were crowned European Champions, winning the LEN Euro League in the 2015 Final Four in Piraeus, after a 10–9 win in the final against the then-reigning champions Sabadell, who were undefeated for more than 3 years with 115 consecutive wins in all competitions. Olympiacos lifted the LEN Euro League title undefeated and having won 8 straight matches without even a single draw. Subsequently, Olympiacos won the 2015 LEN Super Cup as well, defeating Plebiscito Padova, thus completing a continental Treble in 2015 (LEN Euro League, LEN Super Cup, Greek Championship), winning season's all three available titles.

In 2021 Olympiacos won their second LEN Euro League title in Budapest, beating home teams UVSE (9–8 in the semi-final) and Dunaújvárosi (7–6 in the final) with a roster composed entirely of Greek players. They went on to win the Greek League and the Greek Cup, thus completing the first ever Triple Crown for a Greek club in the sport's history, which eventually became a Quadruple Crown after winning the 2021 LEN Super Cup.

In 2022 Olympiacos were crowned back-to-back European Champions in Piraeus, beating UVSE (18–11 in the semi-final) and Sabadell (11–7 in the final). They went on to win the Greek League, the Greek Cup and the 2022 LEN Super Cup, thus completing the second and back-to-back Quadruple Crown in their history.

After the 2015 LEN Euroleague win of Olympiacos women's water polo team, Olympiacos CFP became the only multi-sport club in European Water Polo history after Pro Recco to have been crowned European Champions with both its men's and women's departments and the only club with both its departments currently active (Pro Recco women's department has been dissolved since 2012).

- European Championship
  - Winners (4) (Greek record): 2015, 2021, 2022, 2026
- European Super Cup
  - Winners (4) (Greek record): 2015, 2021, 2022, 2026
- European Cup
  - Winners (1): 2014
- Greek Championship
  - Winners (16) (record): 1995, 1998, 2009, 2011, 2014, 2015, 2016, 2017, 2018, 2019, 2020, 2021, 2022, 2023, 2024, 2026
- Greek Cup
  - Winners (7) (record): 2018, 2020, 2021, 2022, 2023, 2025, 2026
- Greek Super Cup
  - Winners (3) (record): 2020, 2024, 2025

=== Women's volleyball ===
Olympiacos women's volleyball team is one of the most successful volleyball clubs in Greece and the country's most successful in European competitions, having won 9 Greek League titles, a record 11 Cups, a record 8 Doubles, a CEV Challenge Cup (2018) a Continental Treble (2018) and a BVA Cup, the only women's volleyball club in Greece to have won a European title. They hold the unique records for winning eight consecutive Greek League titles (2013–2020), nine consecutive national Cups (2011–2019) and seven consecutive Doubles (2013–2019).

The season 2017–18 was the most successful in the club's history and the most successful by any Greek women's volleyball club in history; besides winning the aforementioned CEV Challenge Cup in their second final presence in a row, they won the domestic competitions undefeated, with 25–0 wins in the League, finishing the season with only two sets lost in an unprecedented 75–2 set record, and 4–0 wins in the Cup with a 12–1 set record, achieving a Continental Treble and their sixth consecutive domestic Double. In the same season, the men's volleyball team reached the CEV Challenge Cup final and Olympiacos became the first Greek volleyball club that had men and women playing simultaneously in European finals, and one of the very few in the continent to have won European trophies in both departments.

- European Cup
  - Winners (1) (Greek record): 2018
- Balkan Cup
  - Winners (1) (Greek record): 2026
- Hellenic Championship
  - Winners (9): 2013, 2014, 2015, 2016, 2017, 2018, 2019, 2020, 2025
- Hellenic Cup
  - Winners (11) (record): 2011, 2012, 2013, 2014, 2015, 2016, 2017, 2018, 2019, 2024, 2025
- Greek Super Cup
  - Winners (1) (record): 2024

=== Women's basketball ===
Olympiacos women's basketball team was initially founded in 1947, being one of the best women's basketball clubs in Greece during the 1950s and the early 1960s, when they won 3 Women's Division Center Championships (1956, 1958, 1959), which was the most important competition of Greek women's basketball at the time (until 1967–68 when the Greek Women's Basketball League was officially organized). The department was dissolved in the mid-1960s and after a long period of inactivity, it was reorganized in 2015.

Olympiacos is one of the most successful clubs in Greek women's basketball history, having won 9 Greek League championships, a record 6 Greek Cups and a record 6 Doubles. From the start of the 2015–16 season (which was the first after its reorganization), till the 25th of October 2020, Olympiacos remained undefeated in all official or friendly games in all domestic competitions (for more than 5 years), setting a world record of 137 consecutive victories (118 of which were in the Greek League), winning 5 consecutive undefeated Greek League championships (2016, 2017, 2018, 2019, 2020) and 4 consecutive undefeated Doubles (2016, 2017, 2018, 2019), while the 2020 Greek Cup was not completed due to the COVID-19 pandemic. The world record of 137 straight wins was finally stopped on October 25, 2020, during the 2020–21 Greek League.

- Greek Championship
  - Winners (9): 2016, 2017, 2018, 2019, 2020, 2022, 2023, 2024, 2025
- Greek Cup
  - Winners (6) (record): 2016, 2017, 2018, 2019, 2022, 2025
- Greek Super Cup
  - Winners (1) (record): 2025

=== Men's handball ===
Olympiacos men's handball department was founded in 1931 and it has won 5 Greek Handball Championships, 4 Greek Cups, 4 Greek Super Cups and has achieved the Double 2 times.

In 2017–18 season, which was the first after its reorganization, Olympiacos won the domestic double. They won the Greek Handball Championship by beating AEK Athens with 3–2 wins in the finals in a dramatic fashion, as they overturned an initial 0–2 win lead by AEK and took three straight wins to secure the League title. They also won the Greek Cup, beating PAOK in the semi-final and ASE Douka in the final to complete the domestic Double.

- Greek Championship
  - Winners (6): 2018, 2019, 2022, 2024, 2025, 2026
- Greek Cup
  - Winners (4): 2018, 2019, 2023, 2026
- Greek Super Cup
  - Winners (5) (record): 2022, 2023, 2024, 2025, 2026

=== Women's Football ===
The women's football department of Olympiacos SFP was founded in 2011 and refounded in 2025. It started competing in the Women's Gamma Ethniki and from the next season it will participate in the Women's Beta Ethniki after winning promotion in the 4th group of the Gamma Ethniki.

- Women's Gamma Ethniki (Tier III): Winners (1): 2025-26 (Group 4).

=== Beach volleyball ===
- Greek Championship
  - Winners (1): 2016

=== Individual sports ===
Source:

=== Swimming ===
Olympiacos (swimming club), founded in 1925, is the most successful team in the history of Greek swimming, having won a record 67 Greek League Championships, 10 Greek Open Water Championships, 4 Greek Cups (25m pool), 1 Panhellenic Masters Championship and 1 Greek Super Cup. The club's dominating success can be further evidenced by the fact that all other Greek swimming clubs have won a combined total of 34 Greek League titles. Olympiacos also hold the record for the most consecutive Greek League titles won, with thirty-one (31) in a row (1996–2026), which is a record in Greek sports history. Olympiakos swimming department holds the world record of having won at least one title in every season, for fifty-eight (58) consecutive years (1969–2026). Since 1997, the department is led by head coach Nikos Gemelos, who has coached Olympiacos to 30 consecutive Greek League titles.

Olympiacos has produced some of the greatest swimmers in Greek swimming history, such as the Olympic silver medalist, five-time Olympian, two-time World Champion, World Cup gold medalist, and two-time European Champion Spyros Gianniotis, who is considered the greatest Greek swimmer of all time.

- Greek Championship
  - Winners (67) (record): 1929, 1930, 1931, 1932, 1933, 1934, 1937, 1960, 1961, 1962, 1967, 1969, 1970, 1971, 1972, 1973, 1974, 1975, 1976, 1977, 1978, 1979, 1980, 1981, 1982, 1983, 1984, 1985, 1986, 1988, 1989, 1990, 1991, 1992, 1993, 1994, 1996, 1997, 1998, 1999, 2000, 2001, 2002, 2003, 2004, 2005, 2006, 2007, 2008, 2009, 2010, 2011, 2012, 2013, 2014, 2015, 2016, 2017, 2018, 2019, 2020, 2021, 2022, 2023, 2024, 2025, 2026
- Greek Cup (25m pool)
  - Winners (4): 1997, 1998, 1999, 2001
- Greek Open Water Championship (long-distance)
  - Winners (10) (record): 2010, 2015, 2016, 2017, 2018, 2019, 2020, 2021, 2022, 2023
- Greek Super Cup
  - Winners (1) (record): 2015
- Panhellenic Masters Championship
  - Winners (1) (shared record): 2017
- Panhellenic Masters Open Water Championship (long-distance)
  - Winners (1) (shared record):
- Winter Greek Championship
  - Winners (33): 1980, 1981, 1982, 1983, 1984, 1985, 1986, 1988, 1989, 1990, 1991, 1993, 1994, 1995, 1996, 1997, 1998, 2001, 2002, 2003, 2004, 2005, 2006, 2007, 2008, 2009, 2011, 2013, 2014, 2015, 2016, 2017, 2018
- Winter Greek Christmas Cup
  - Winners (20): 1992, 1994, 1995, 1996, 1997, 1998, 1999, 2001, 2002, 2003, 2005, 2006, 2007, 2008, 2013, 2014, 2015, 2016, 2017, 2018
- Panhellenic Winter Cup
  - Winners (1): 2024

=== Athletics ===
Olympiacos track and field department was established in 1925. The department has had in its ranks some of the greatest Greek athletes ever in the track and field events including Olympic medalists, as well as World, European, Mediterranean, Balkan and Panhellenic Champions. Cases in point are: Konstantinos Kenteris, Fani Halkia, Ekaterini Thanou, Mirela Maniani, Niki Bakoyianni, Hrysopiyi Devetzi, Niki Xanthou, Dimitrios Chondrokoukis, Labros Papakostas, Periklis Iakovakis, Ekaterini Voggoli, Hristos Meletoglou, Stelios Dimotsios, Dimitrios Polymerou, Haralabos Papadias, Maria Karastamati, Flora Redoumi, Athina Papayianni, Spyridon Vasdekis, Aggeliki Tsiolakoudi, Louis Tsatoumas and Emmanouil Karalis.

- Greek Open Championship (Men)
  - Winners (15): 2006, 2007, 2008, 2009, 2010, 2011, 2012, 2013, 2014, 2016, 2017, 2018, 2019, 2020, 2022
- Greek Indoors Championship (Men)
  - Winners (10): 2010, 2011, 2012, 2013, 2015, 2016, 2017, 2018, 2019, 2020
- Greek Cross Country Championship (Men)
  - Winners (13): 1965, 1966, 1967, 1984, 2003, 2005, 2007, 2008, 2009, 2010, 2011, 2013, 2025
- Panhellenic Club Championship (Men)
  - Winners (1): 2000
- Open Greek Championship (Women)
  - Winners (1): 2010

=== Table tennis ===
Olympiacos table tennis department was established in 1956 and has both a men's and a women's department. Olympiacos is one of the most successful clubs in Greek table tennis history, with its women's department being the most successful, having won a record 30 Greek Leagues and a record 11 Greek Cups.

Olympiacos men's department are the only Greek men's table tennis team that have won a European title, having won the ETTU Europe Trophy in 2022–23. They have also won 18 Greek Leagues and 8 Greek Cups.

- ETTU Europe Trophy (Men)
  - Winners (1) (record): 2023
- Greek Championship (Men)
  - Winners (19): 1971, 1972, 1973, 1974, 1976, 1977, 1978, 1980, 2004, 2005, 2014, 2016, 2017, 2018, 2022, 2023, 2024, 2025, 2026
- Greek Championship (Women)
  - Winners (30) (record): 1954, 1955, 1956, 1957, 1958, 1959, 1960, 1961, 1962, 1964, 1965, 1976, 1977, 1978, 1979, 1981, 1982, 1983, 2000, 2001, 2002, 2005, 2006, 2007, 2009, 2018, 2022, 2023, 2024, 2025
- Greek Cup (Men)
  - Winners (8): 1971, 1972, 2003, 2004, 2005, 2008, 2022, 2023
- Greek Cup (Women)
  - Winners (11) (record): 1965, 1966, 1983, 1984, 1985, 1986, 2001, 2005, 2006, 2007, 2008

=== Wrestling ===
Olympiacos wrestling department was initially founded in 1934 and then reorganized in 1961. It was the first section in individual sports in Greece to win a European title, the CELA Cup in 2006. The most important athletes in the history of the department were the Koutsioumpas brothers, the Athens' Olympic Bronze Medalist Artiom Kiouregkian and Christos Gikas amongst many others.

- CELA Cup
  - Winners (1) (Greek record): 2006
- Greek Championship (Men)
  - Winners (2): 1976, 2006

=== Boxing ===
- Greek Championship (Men)
  - Winners (9): 1970, 1985, 2017, 2018, 2019, 2021, 2022, 2024, 2025
- Greek Championship (Women)
  - Winners (4): 2012, 2015, 2023, 2024

=== Diving ===
- Greek Championship
  - Winners (9): 1961, 1962, 1963, 1964, 1965, 1966, 1967, 1970, 1971

=== Sailing ===
- Greek Club Championship
  - Winners (1): 1954

=== Gymnastics ===
- Greek Championship (Men)
  - Winners (1): 1971

=== Canoe kayak ===
- Greek Championship
  - Winners (1): 2018

== European and worldwide honours ==
Season	Football	Basketball	Men's volleyball	Women's volleyball	Men's water polo	Women's water polo	Men's Handball	Wrestling	Superleague Formula	Table tennis
1961–63	Balkans Cup; Winners									
1978–79		FIBA European Champions Cup; Semi-finals								
1981–82			CEV Champions League; 4th place							
1991–92			CEV Champions League; Final							
1991–92			FIVB Volleyball Men's Club World Championship; Third							
1992–93	UEFA Cup Winners' Cup; Quarter-finals		CEV Champions League; Third							
1993–94		FIBA Euroleague; Final	CEV Champions League; 4th place							
1994–95		FIBA Euroleague; Final	CEV Champions League; Third							
1995–96			CEV Cup Winners' Cup; Winners			LEN Women's Champions League; 4th place				
1995–96			CEV European Super Cup; 4th place			LEN Women's Champions League; 4th place				
1996–97		FIBA Euroleague; European; Champions	CEV Cup Winners' Cup; Final							
1996–97		McDonald's Championship; Final	CEV Cup Winners' Cup; Final							
1997–98			CEV Cup Winners' Cup; Final		LEN Cup Winners' Cup; Final					
1998–99	UEFA Champions League; Quarter-finals	FIBA Euroleague; Τhird			LEN Cup Winners' Cup; Final					
2000–01			CEV Champions League; 4th place		LEN Champions League; Final	LEN Women's Euro Cup; 4th place				
2001–02			CEV Champions League; Final		LEN Champions League; European; Champions					
2001–02			CEV Champions League; Final		LEN Super Cup; Supercup; Champions					
2004–05			CEV Top Teams Cup; Winners							
2005–06								CELA Cup; Winners		
2006–07					LEN Champions League; 4th place	LEN Women's Euro Cup; 4th place				
2007–08						LEN Women's Euro Cup; Final				
2008–09		Euroleague; 4th place				LEN Women's Euro Cup; Semi-finals				
2009–10		Euroleague; Final				LEN Women's Champions League; 4th place			Superleague Formula; 4th place	
2010–11						LEN Women's Champions League; Third				
2011–12		Euroleague; European; Champions				LEN Women's Euro Cup; Semi-finals				
2012–13		Euroleague; European; Champions								
2012–13		Intercontinental Cup; Intercontinental; Champions								
2013–14						LEN Women's Euro Cup; Winners				
2013–14						LEN Women's Super Cup; Final				
2014–15		Euroleague; Final				LEN Women's Champions League; European; Champions				
2014–15		Euroleague; Final				LEN Women's Super Cup; Supercup; Champions				
2015–16					LEN Champions League; Final	LEN Women's Champions League 4th place				
2016–17		Euroleague; Final		CEV Women's Challenge Cup Final		LEN Women's Champions League Final				
2017–18			CEV Challenge Cup Final	CEV Women's Challenge Cup Winners	LEN Champions League; European; Champions	LEN Women's Euro Cup; Final				
2017–18			CEV Challenge Cup Final	CEV Women's Challenge Cup Winners	LEN Super Cup Final	LEN Women's Euro Cup; Final				
2018–19			CEV Cup Semi-finals		LEN Champions League; Final	LEN Women's Champions League Final				
2019–20				CEV Women's Challenge Cup Semi-finals						
2020–21						LEN Women's Champions League; European; Champions				
2020–21						LEN Women's Super Cup; Supercup; Champions				
2021–22		Euroleague; 4th place				LEN Women's Champions League; European; Champions				
2021–22		Euroleague; 4th place				LEN Women's Super Cup; Supercup; Champions				
2022–23		Euroleague; Final	CEV Challenge Cup; Winners							ETTU Europe Trophy; Winners
2023–24	UEFA Youth League; European Champions	EuroLeague; 3rd place			LEN Champions League; 3rd place	LEN Women's Champions League Final	EHF European Cup; Final			
2023–24	UEFA Europa Conference League; Winners	EuroLeague; 3rd place			LEN Champions League; 3rd place	LEN Women's Champions League Final	EHF European Cup; Final			
2023–24	Intercontinental Cup Under-20; Final	EuroLeague; 3rd place			LEN Champions League; 3rd place	LEN Women's Champions League Final	EHF European Cup; Final			
2024–25	UEFA Youth League; Quarter-finals	EuroLeague; 3rd place				LEN Women's Champions League; 3rd place				
2025–26		EuroLeague; European Champions			LEN Champions League; 4th place	LEN Women's Champions League; European Champions				
2025–26		EuroLeague SuperCup; Final			LEN Champions League; 4th place	LEN Women's Super Cup; Supercup; Champions				
2026-27				BVA Cup Winners						

== The gate 7 tragedy ==
The history of the Karaiskakis Stadium and Olympiacos was marked by the worst tragedy that ever hit Greek sports, known as the Karaiskakis Stadium disaster. On 8 February 1981, Olympiacos hosted AEK Athens for a League match, which ended 6–0, in an unprecedented triumph for the host team of Piraeus. During the last minutes of the game, thousands of Olympiacos fans at the Gate 7 rushed to the exit, to get to the stadium's main entrance and celebrate with the players, but the doors were almost closed and the turnstiles still in place, making the exit almost impossible. As people continued to come down from the stands, unable to see what happened, the stairs of Gate 7 became a death trap; people were crushed, tens of fans were seriously injured and twenty-one young people died, most of them by suffocation.

In memory of this event, every year on February 8, there is a memorial service at the stadium in honor of the supporters that died in that incident. The service is attended by thousands of fans every year, who are rhythmically shouting the phrase "Αδέλφια, ζείτε, εσείς μας οδηγείτε." (Adhélfia, zíte, esís mas odhiyíte, "Brothers, you live, you are the ones who guide us."). At the tribune part of the stadium where Gate 7 is now, some seats are colored black instead of red, shaping the number "7", whereas there is also a monument on the eastern side of the stadium, bearing the names of all 21 supporters killed on that day in the stadium.

Even though this incident affected almost solely the fanbase of Olympiacos, other teams occasionally pay their respects to the people killed as well, as they consider the incident to be a tragedy not only for one team, but for the whole country. In the past, even foreign teams, such as Liverpool F.C. and Red Star Belgrade have honored the incident's victims.

== Gallery ==
=== Football ===
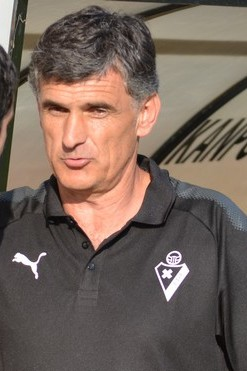
José Luis Mendilibar

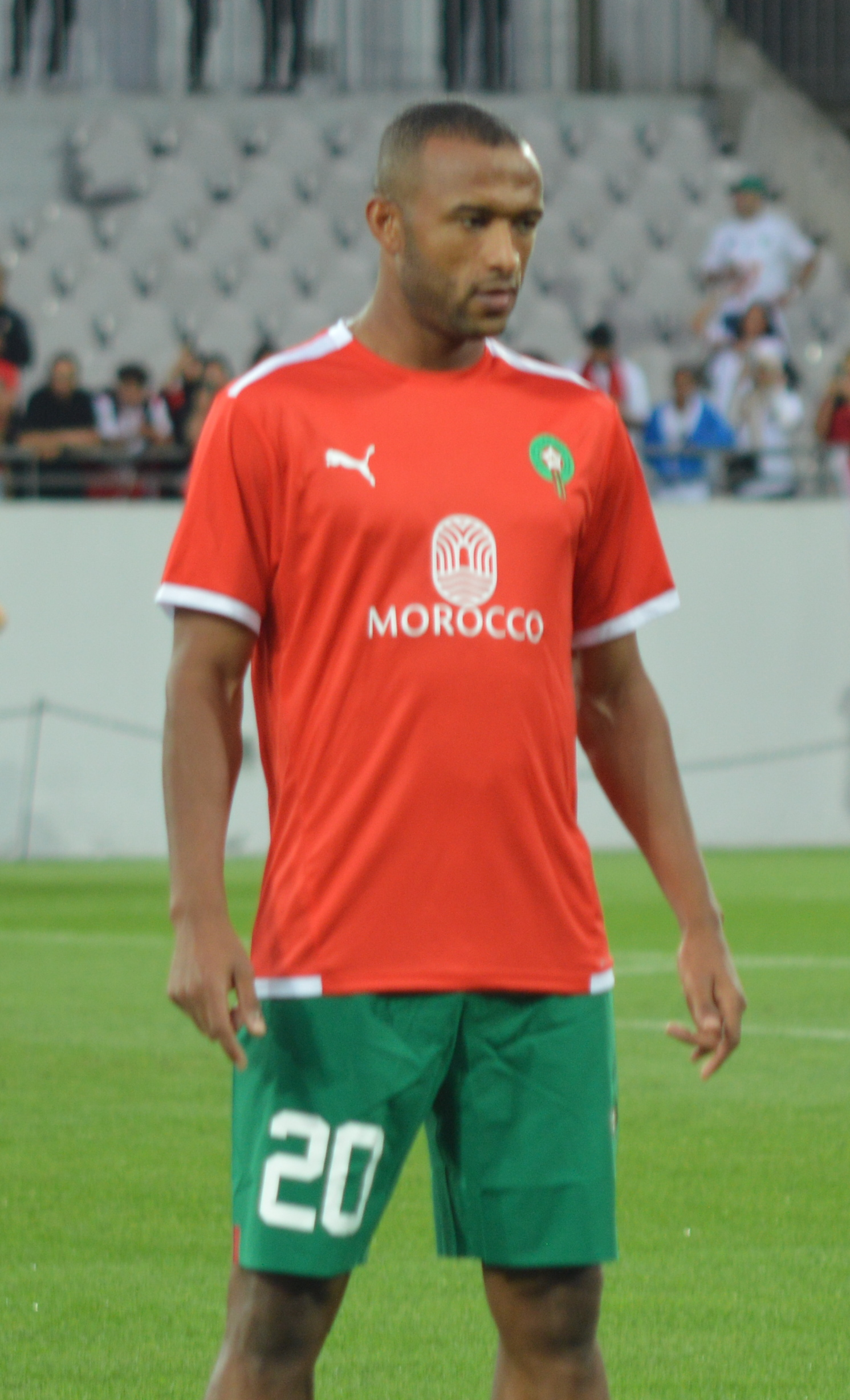
Ayoub El Kaabi

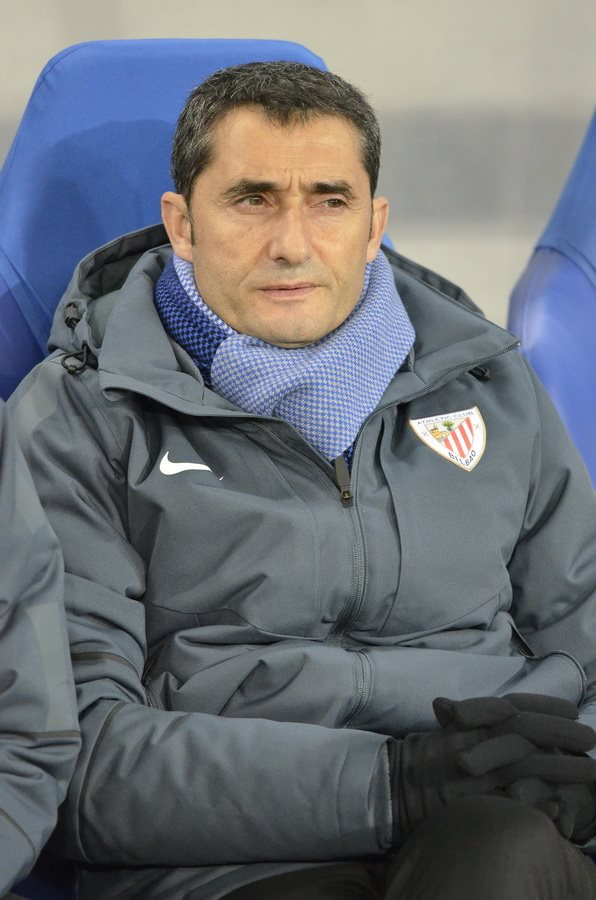
Ernesto Valverde

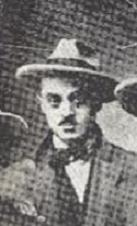
Notis Kamperos inspired the name and the emblem of the club

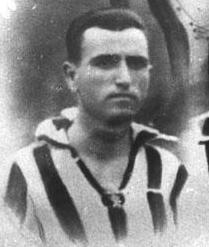
Giannis Andrianopoulos, Olympiacos co-founder, first ever coach and later president

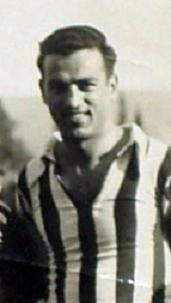
Giorgos Andrianopoulos, Olympiacos co-founder, player and president

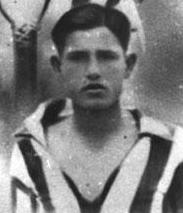
Leonidas Andrianopoulos

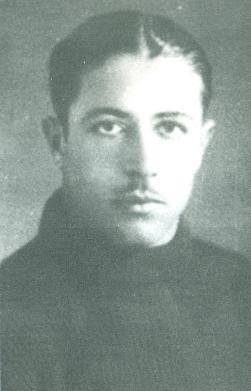
Achilleas Grammatikopoulos

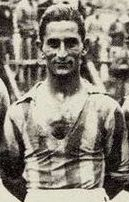
Giannis Vazos, Olympiacos captain and 2nd all-time goalscorer

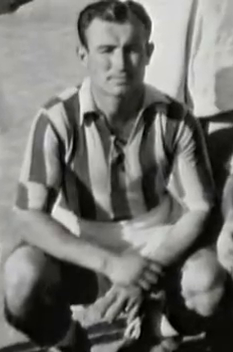
Midfielder Nikos Godas, fought against the Nazis. He was executed with his Olympiacos shirt on

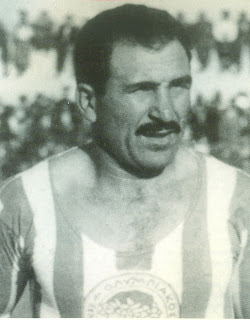
Andreas Mouratis, Olympiacos captain

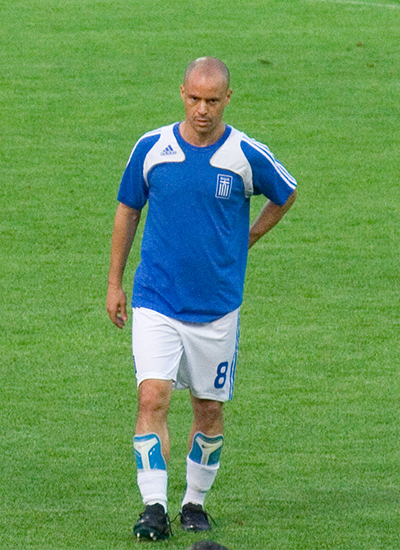
Stelios Giannakopoulos

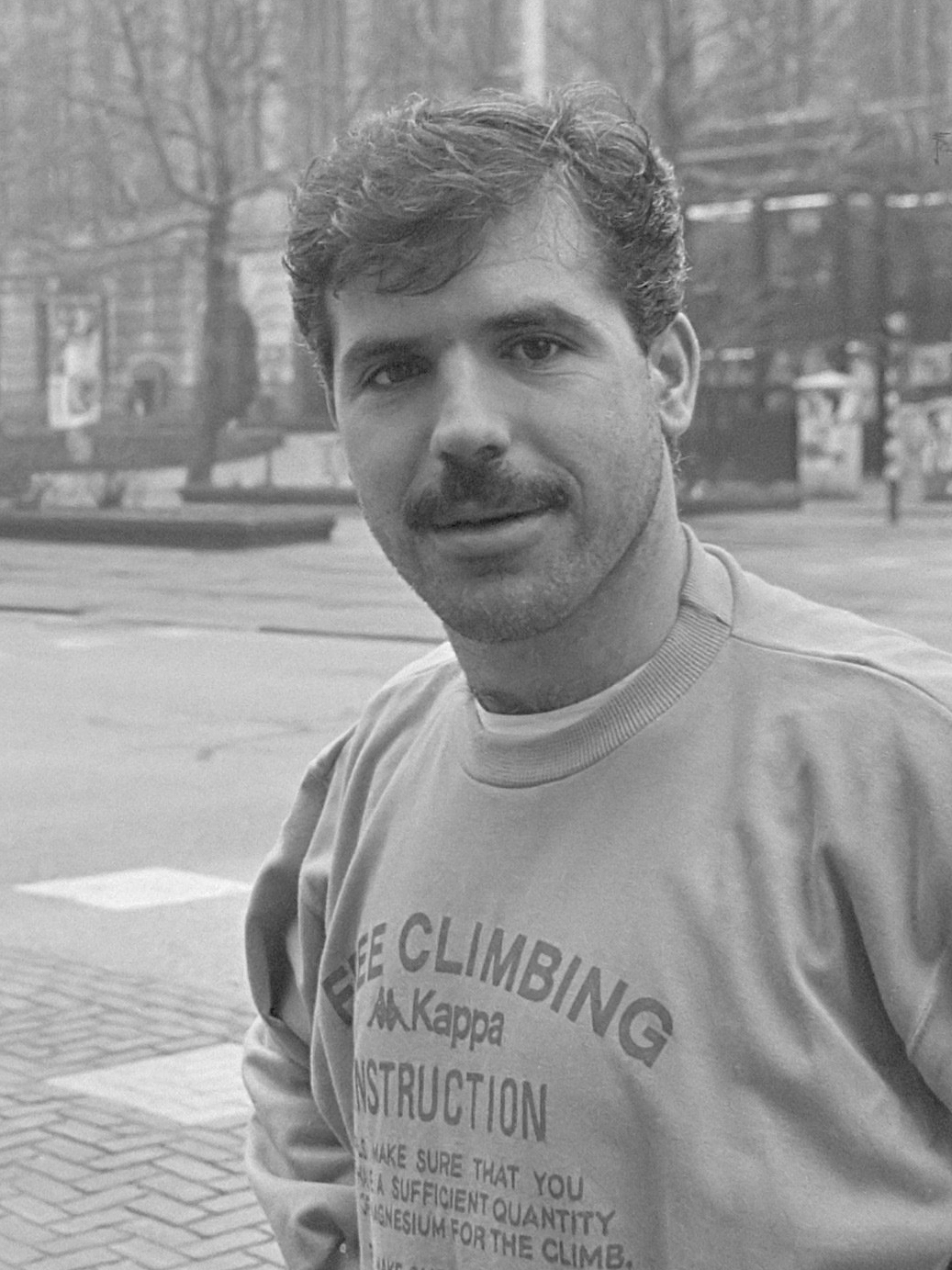
Nikos Anastopoulos, one of the greatest strikers in club's history

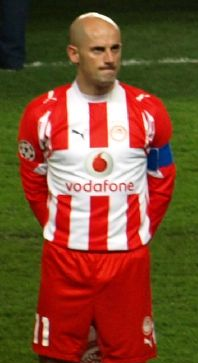
Predrag Đorđević, club's record foreign goalscorer

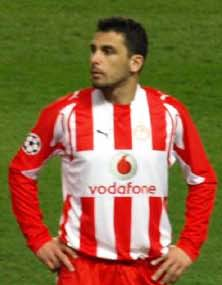
Ieroklis Stoltidis

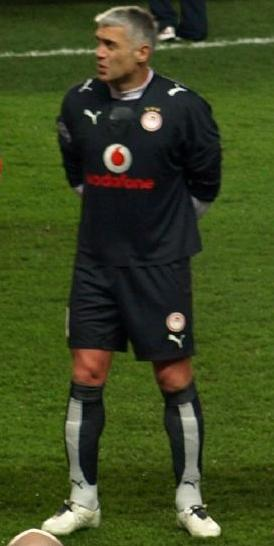
Antonis Nikopolidis

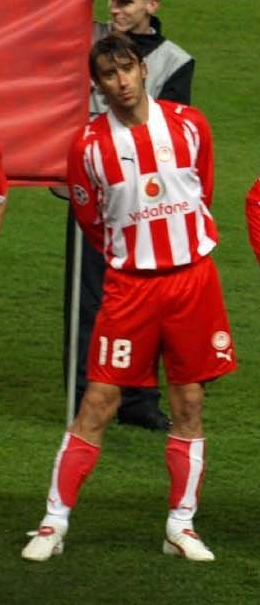
Paraskevas Antzas

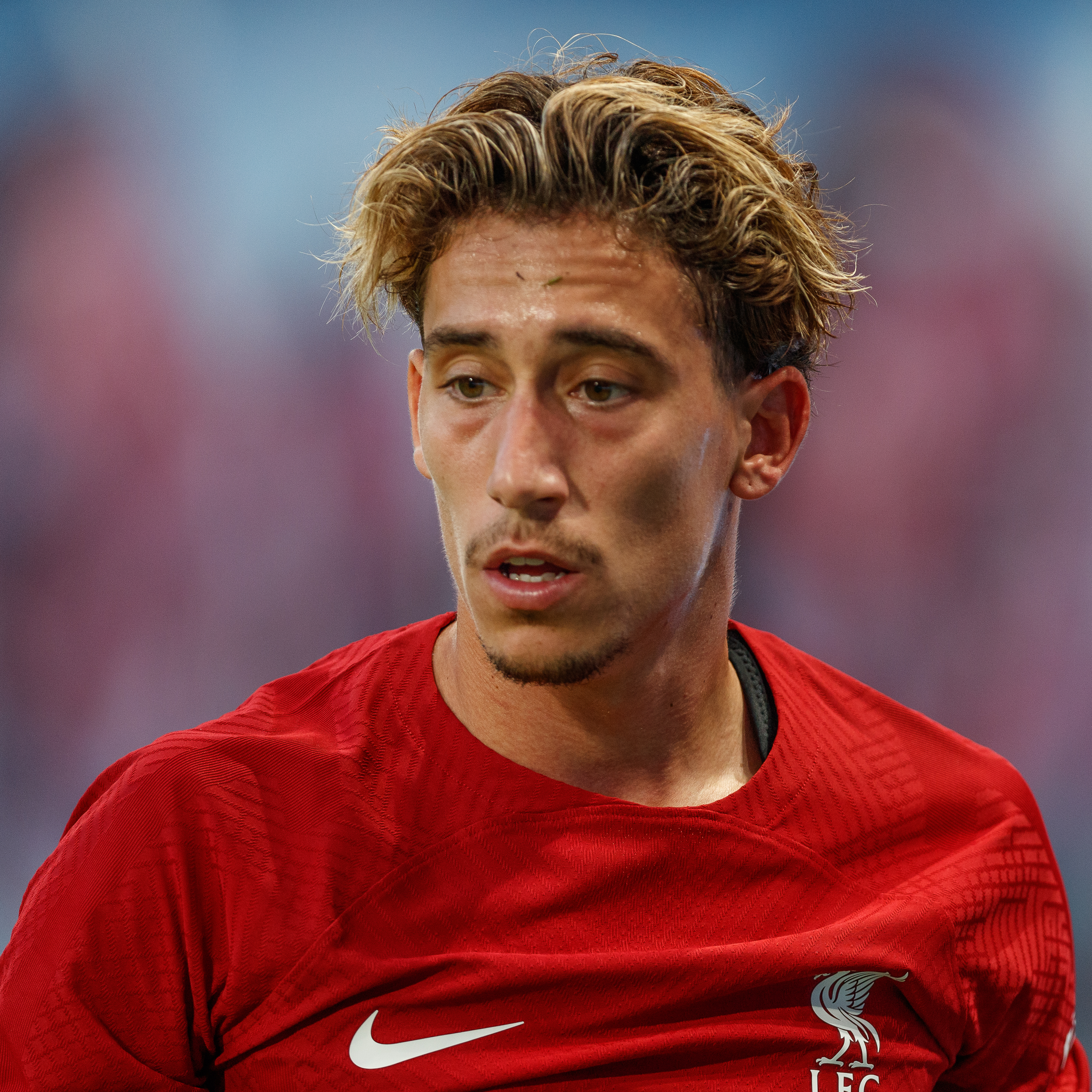
Kostas Tsimikas

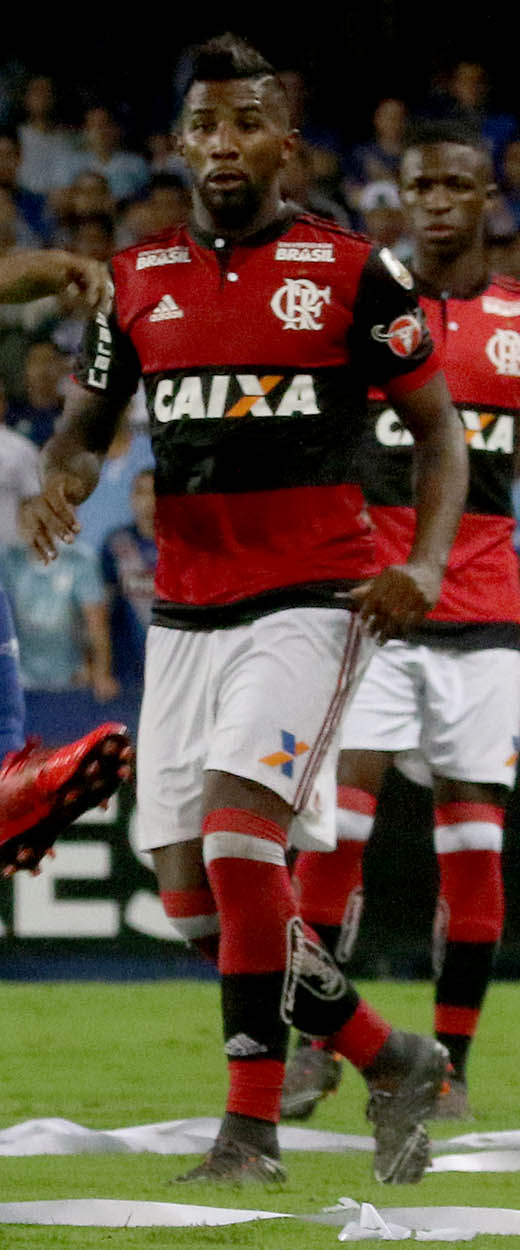
Rodinei

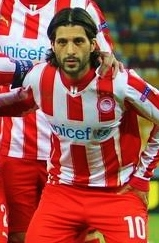
Alejandro Dominguez

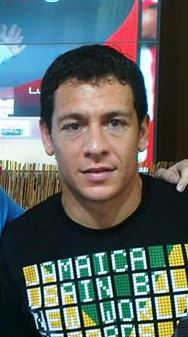
Luciano Galletti

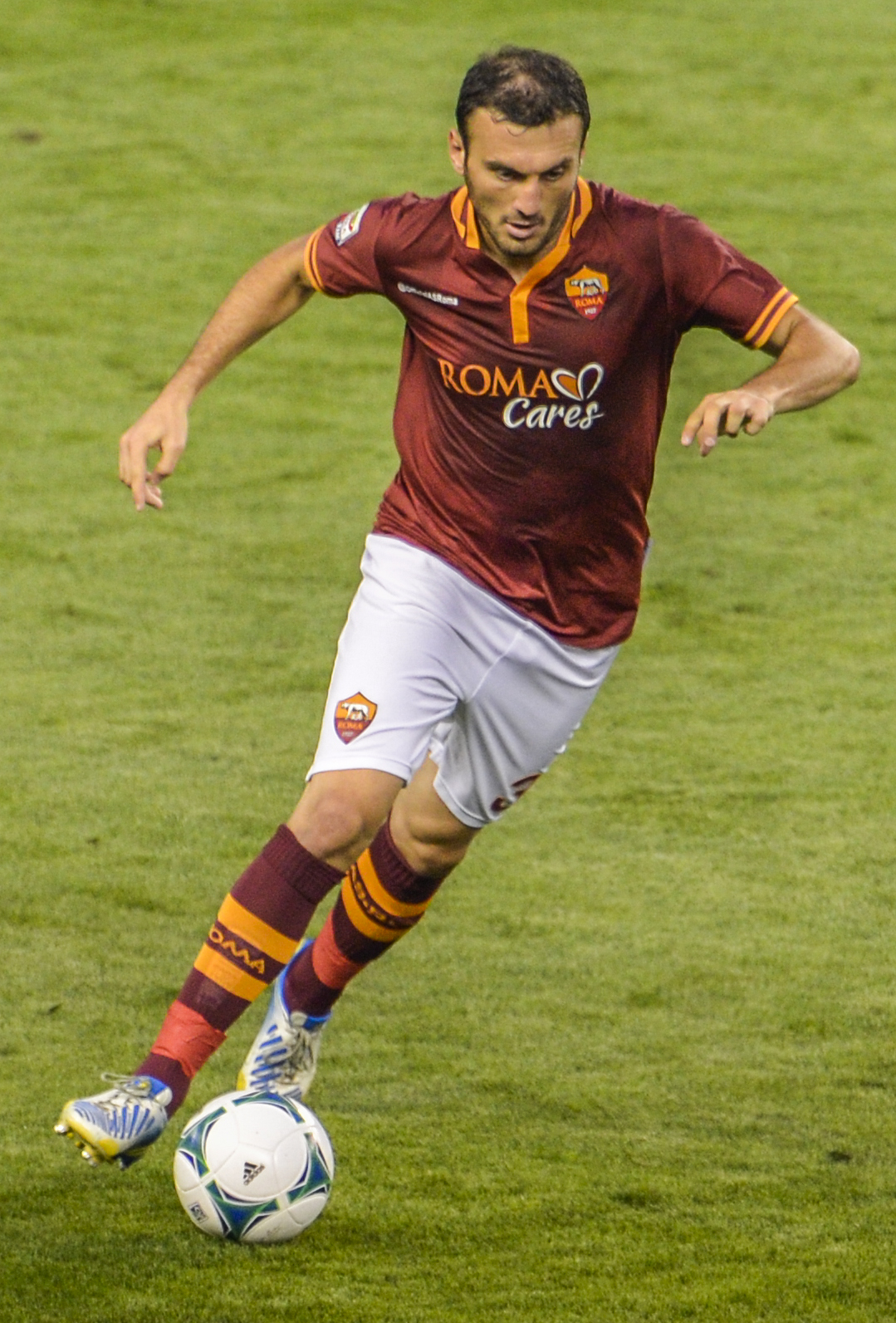
Vasilis Torosidis

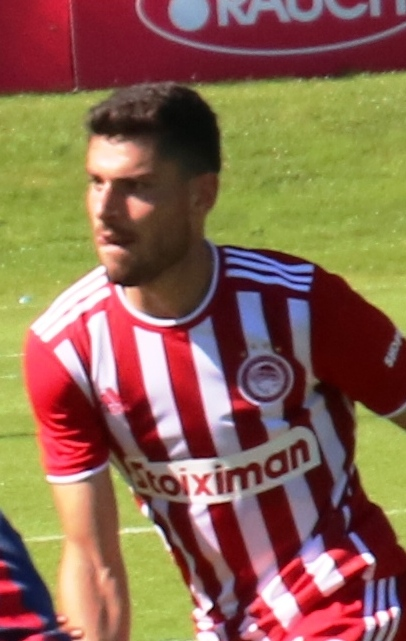
Georgios Masouras

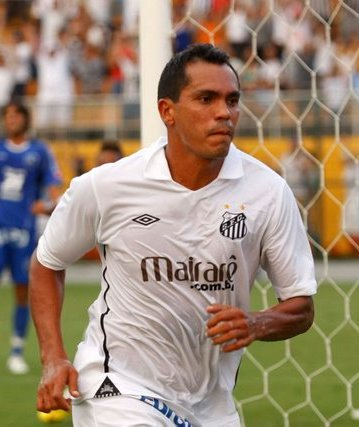
Giovanni Silva de Oliveira

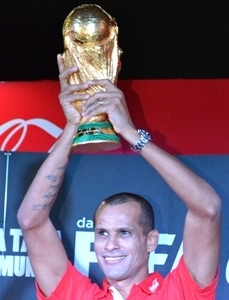
Rivaldo

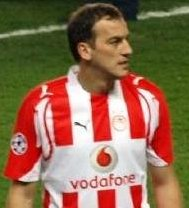
Darko Kovačević

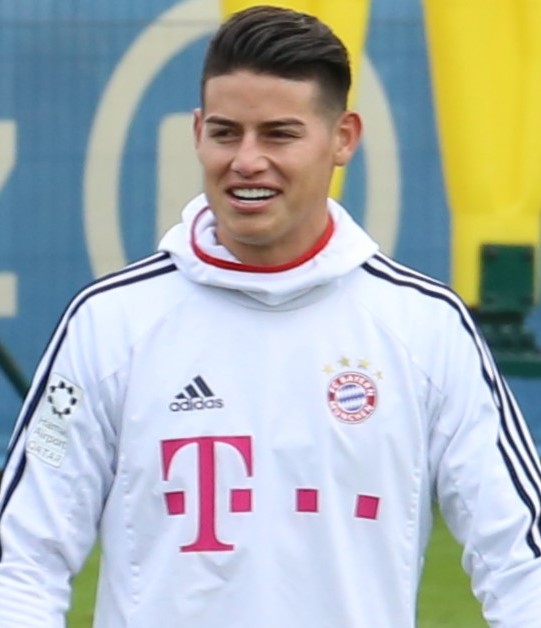
James Rodriguez

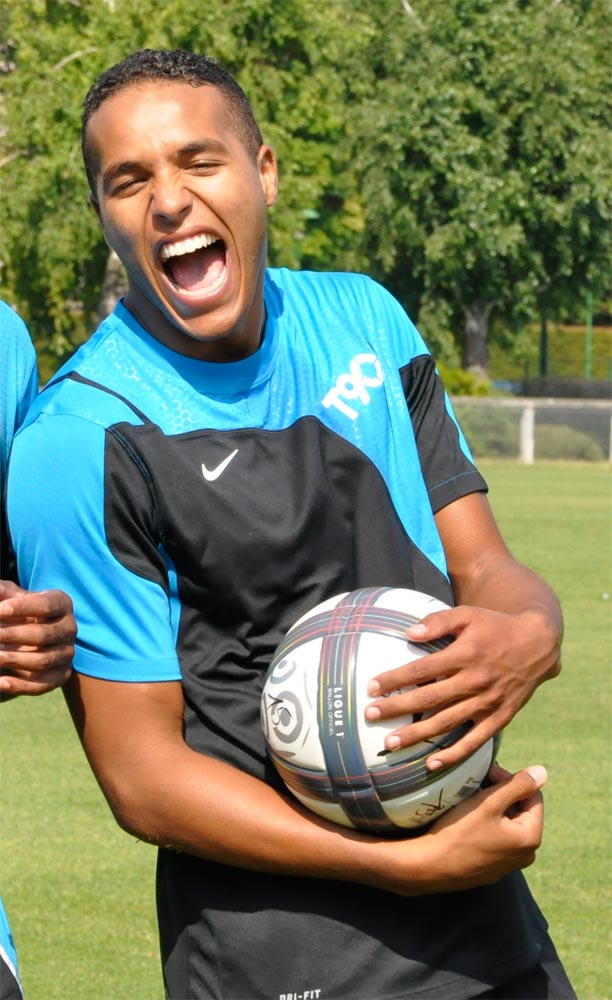
Youssef El-Arabi

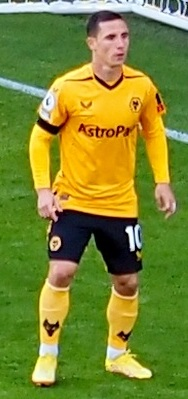
Daniel Podence

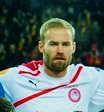
Olof Mellberg

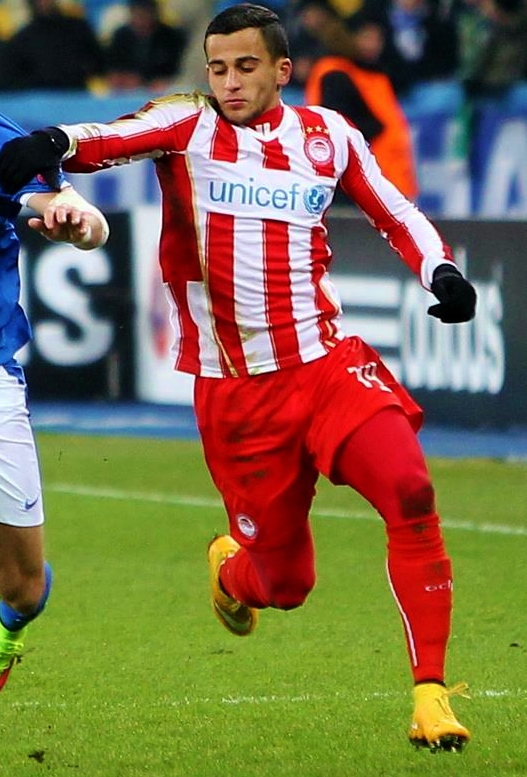
Omar Elabdellaoui

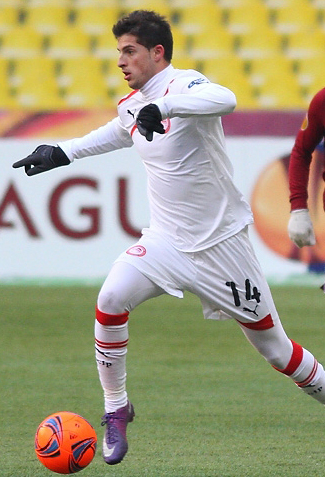
Kevin Mirallas

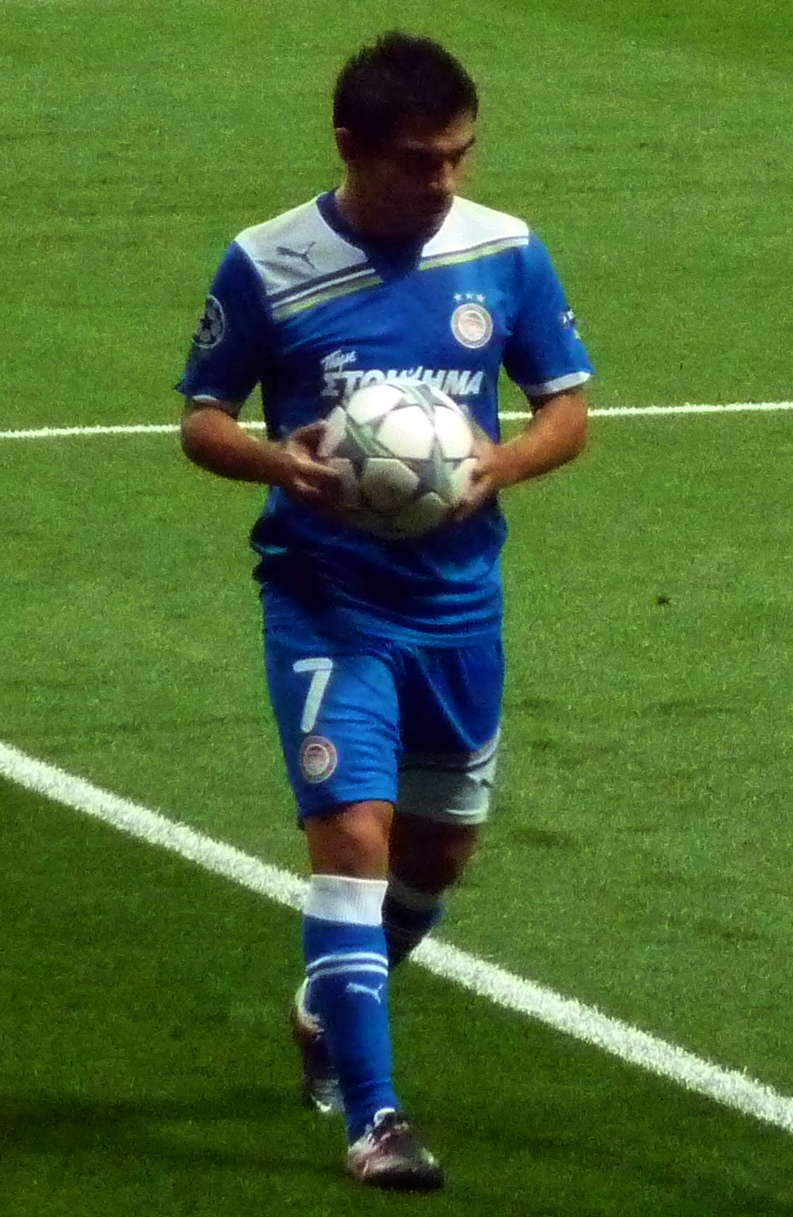
Ariel Ibagaza

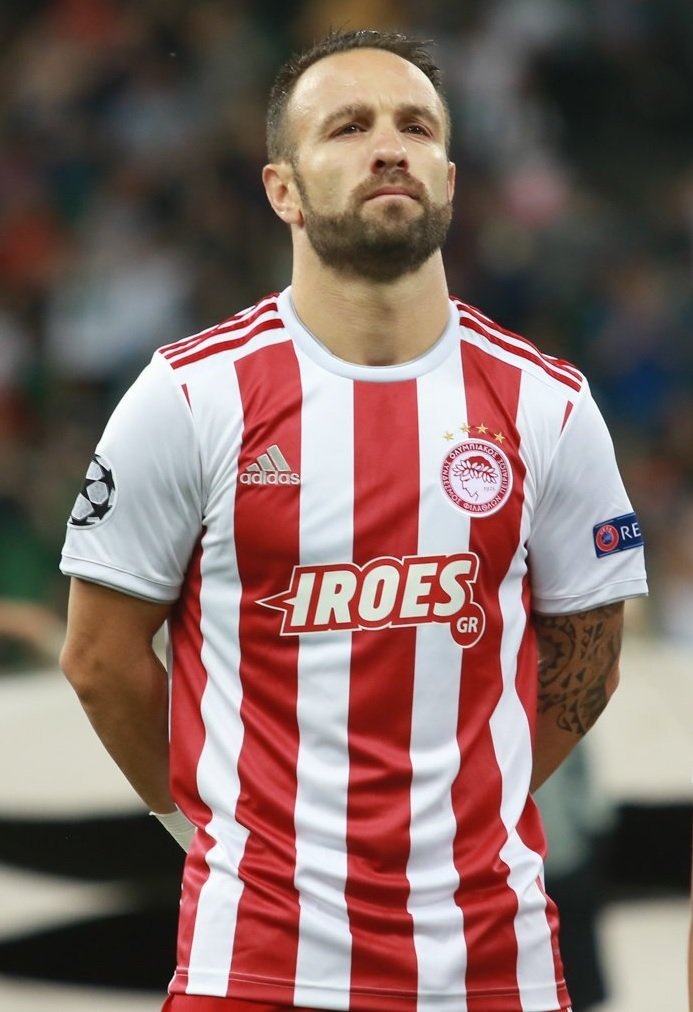
Mathieu Valbuena

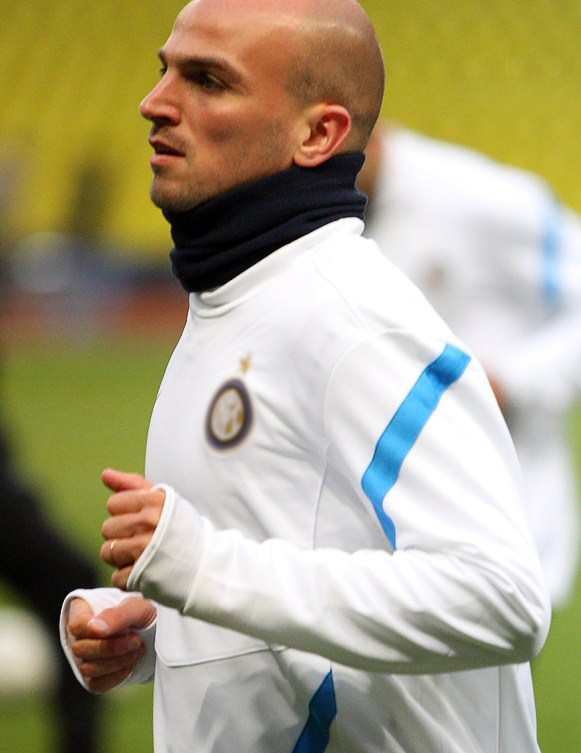
Esteban Cambiasso

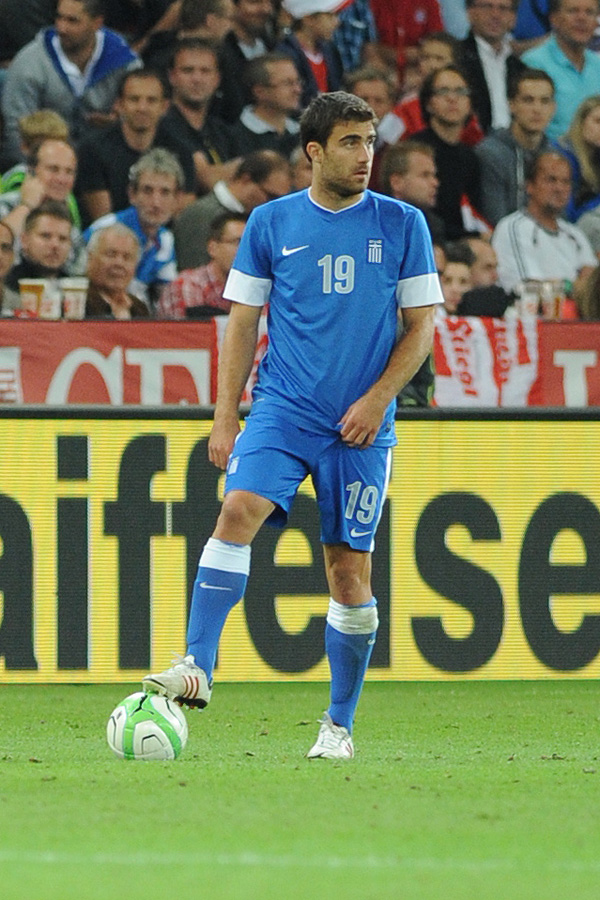
Sokratis Papastathopoulos

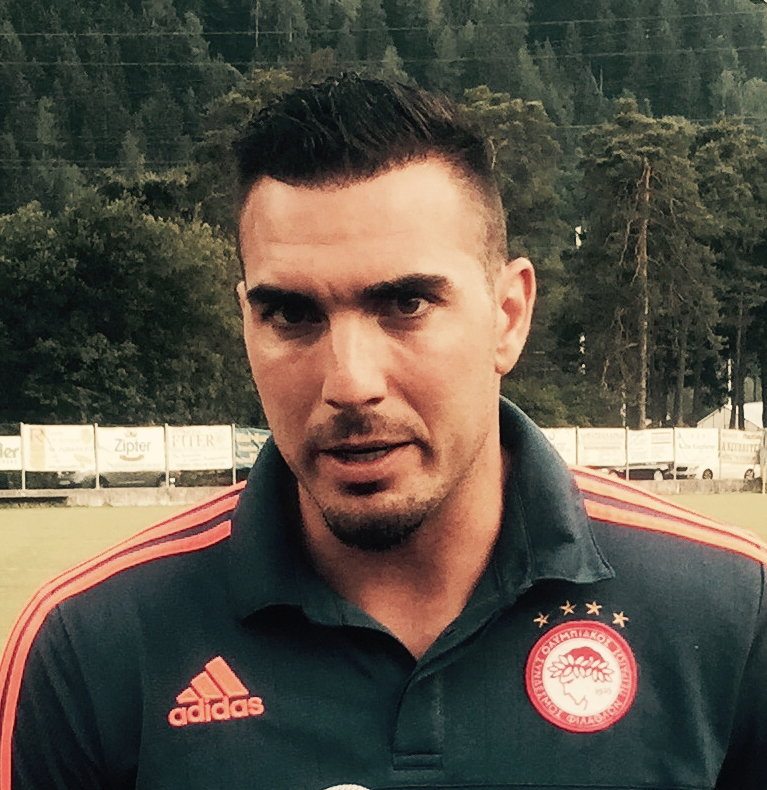
Roberto

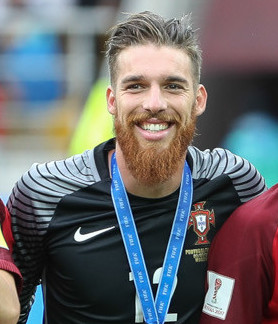
José Sá

=== Basketball (men's) ===
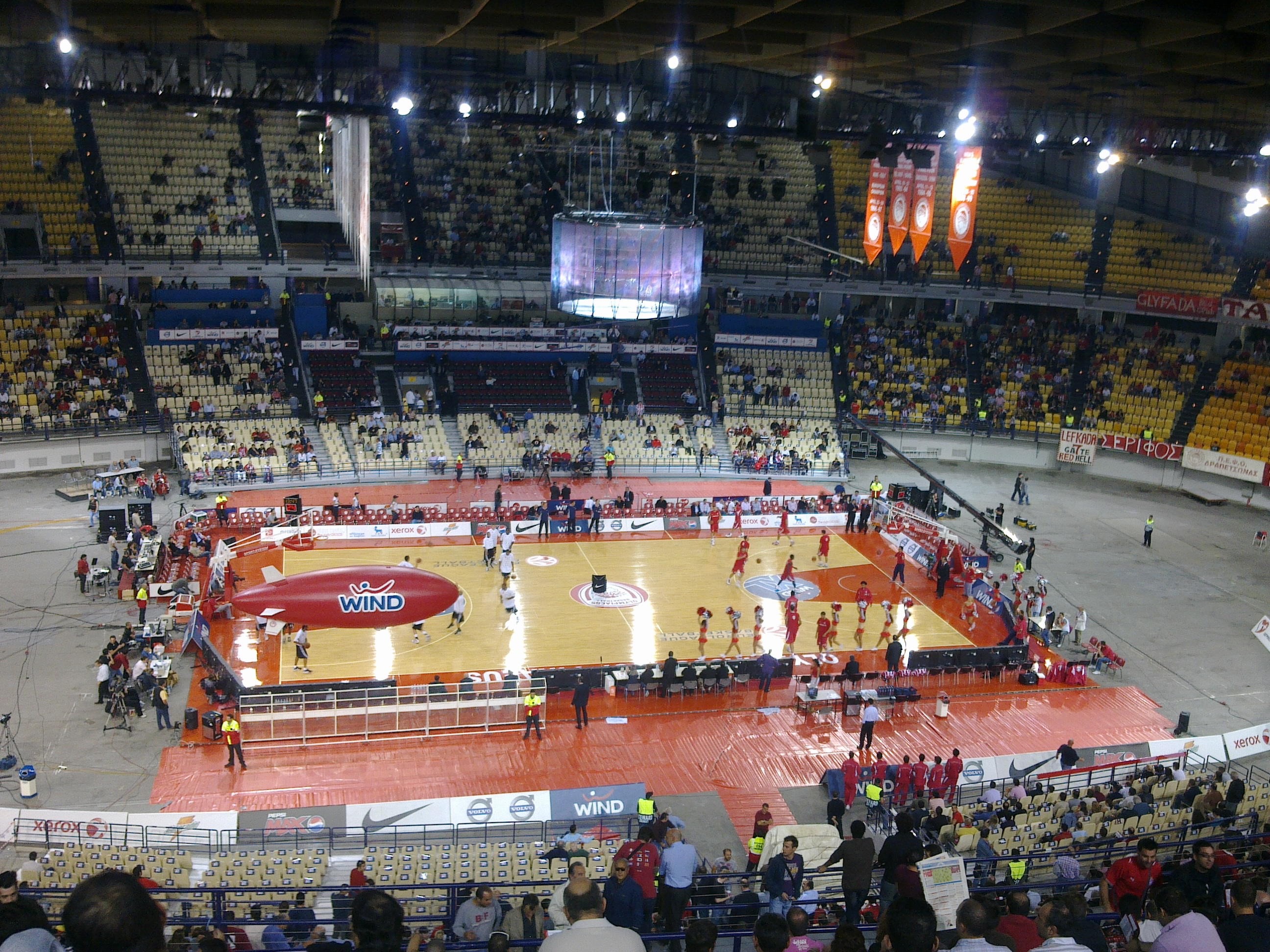
Peace and Friendship Stadium, Olympiacos home arena

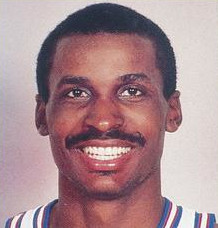
Eddie Johnson led Olympiacos to the 1995 Euroleague final and the 1995 Greek League title

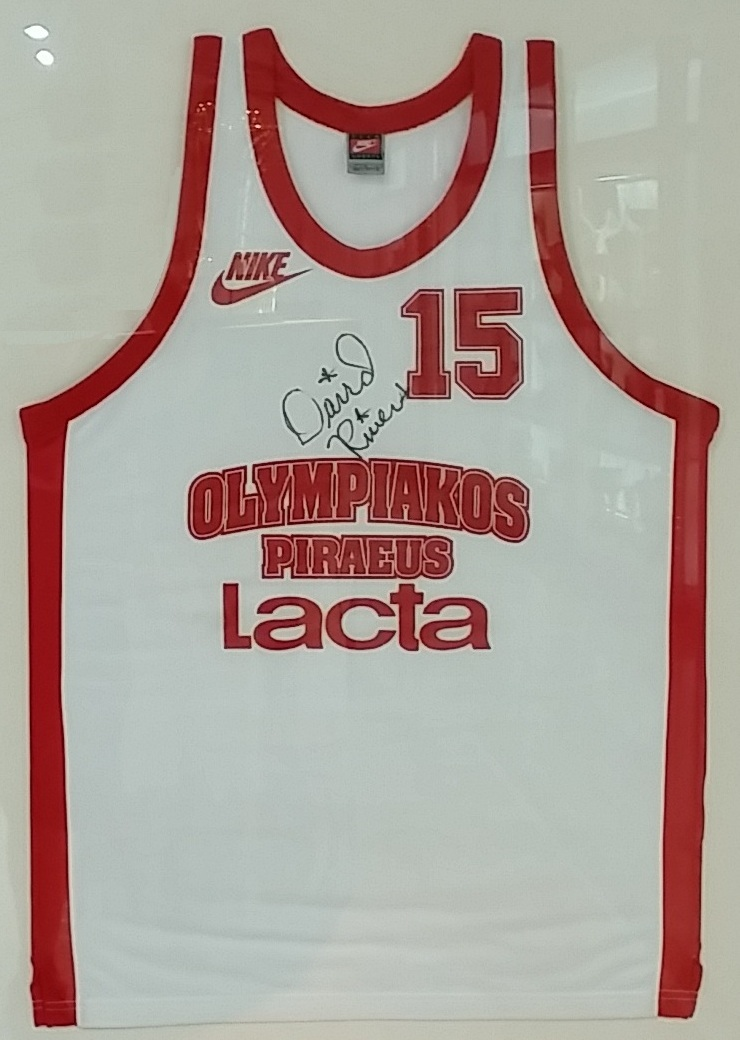
David Rivers shirt from the 1997 Euroleague Final win against FC Barcelona (73–58)

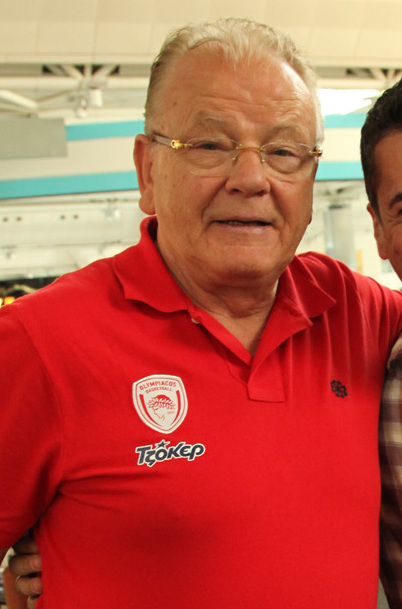
Dušan Ivković coached Olympiacos to 2 Euroleague titles and 1 Triple Crown

Sasha Vezenkov 2 times Euroleague MVP and Alphonso Ford EuroLeague Top Scorer Trophy 2023 and 2026 and EuroLeague Champion with Olympiacos in 2026

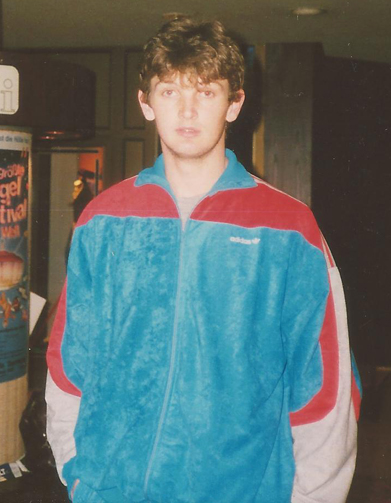
Žarko Paspalj

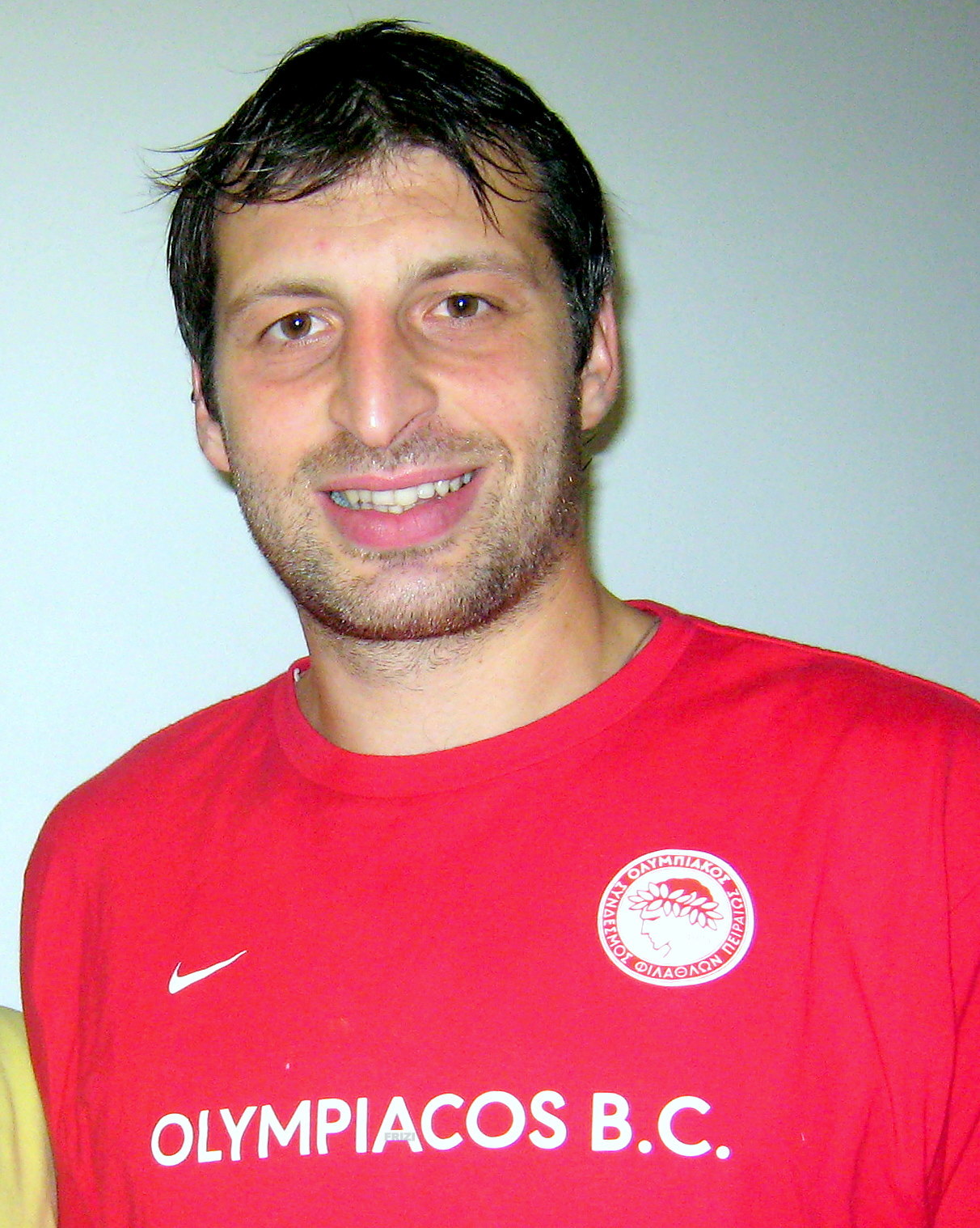
Theodoros Papaloukas, Euroleague Basketball Legend and one of the 50 Greatest Euroleague Contributors

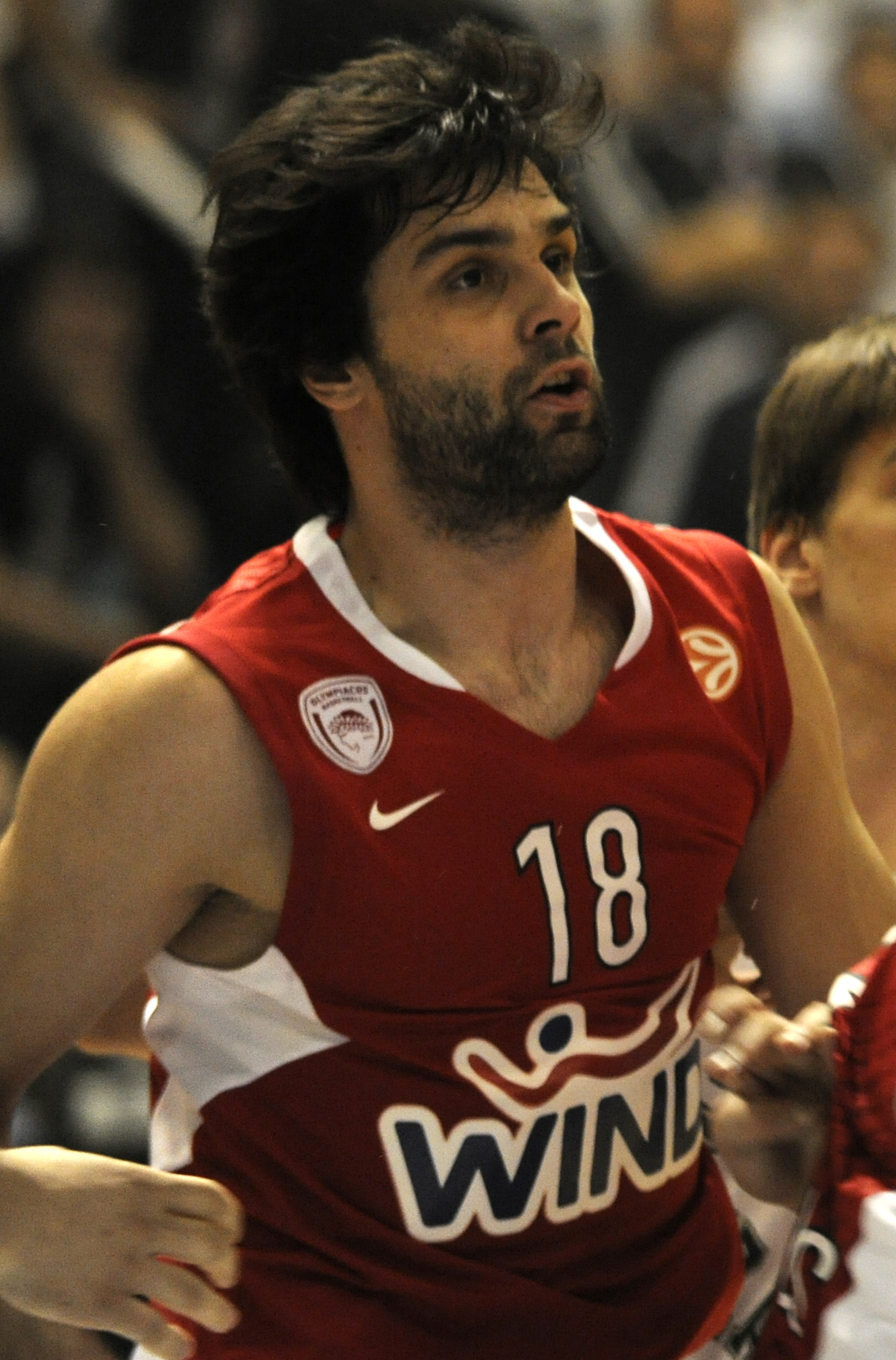
Miloš Teodosić, Euroleague MVP in 2010 with Olympiacos

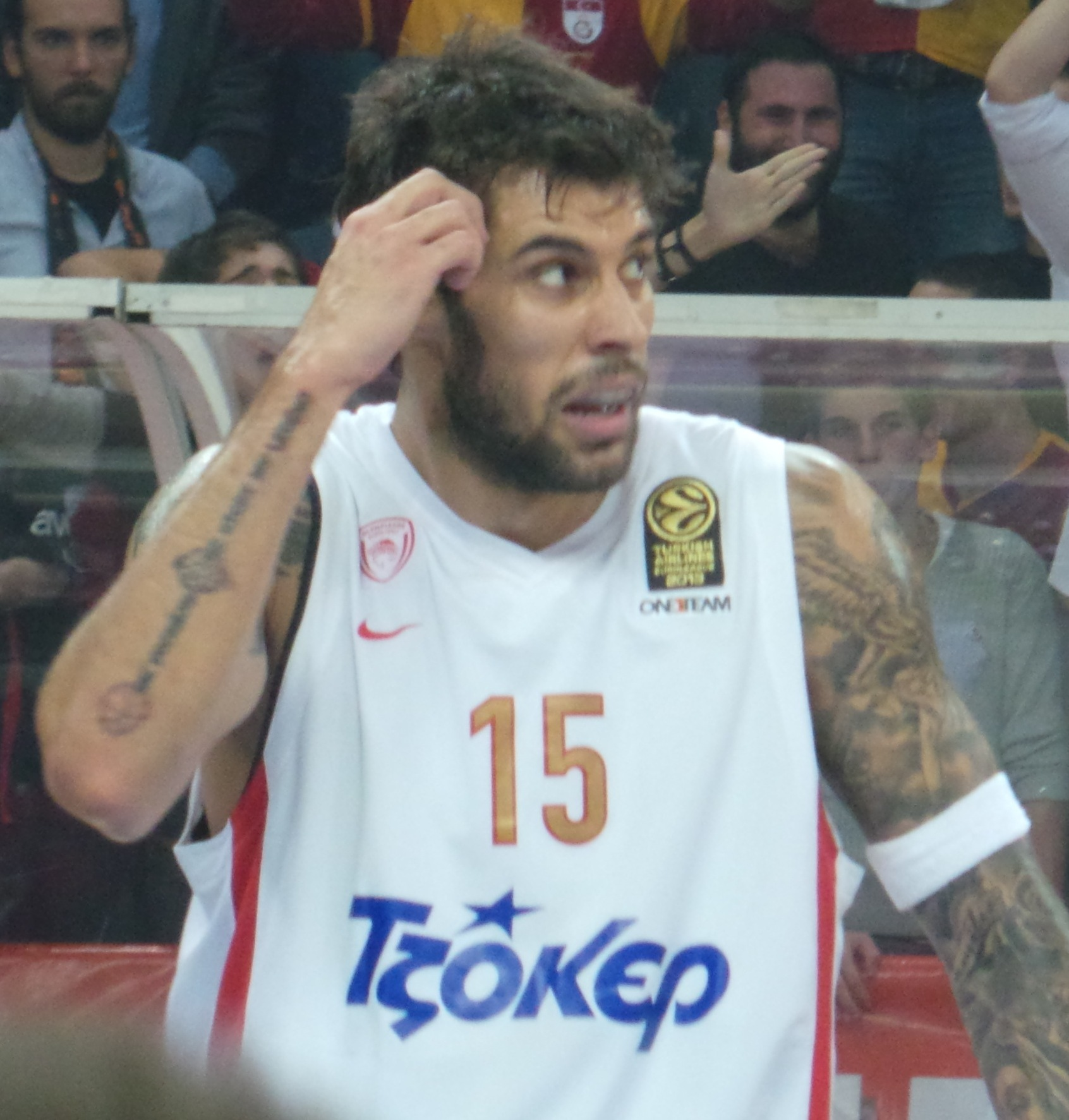
Giorgos Printezis, 2x Euroleague Champion and 1x Intercontinental Cup Champion with Olympiacos

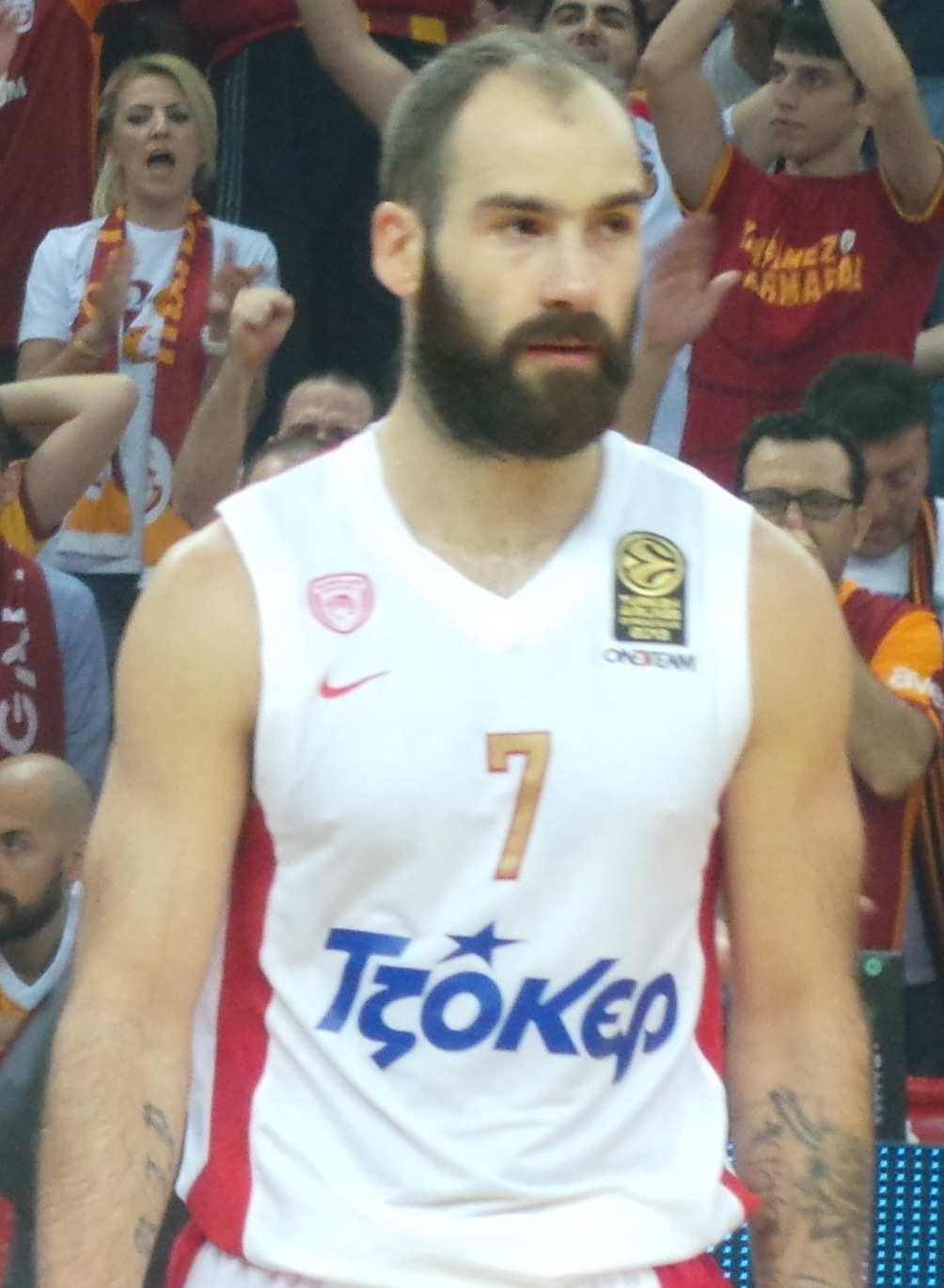
Vassilis Spanoulis led Olympiacos in 2 back-to-back Euroleague titles in 2012 and 2013, winning two Euroleague Final Four MVP awards

Kostas Papanikolaou, three Euroleague Champion and 2013 Euroleague Rising Star with Olympiacos

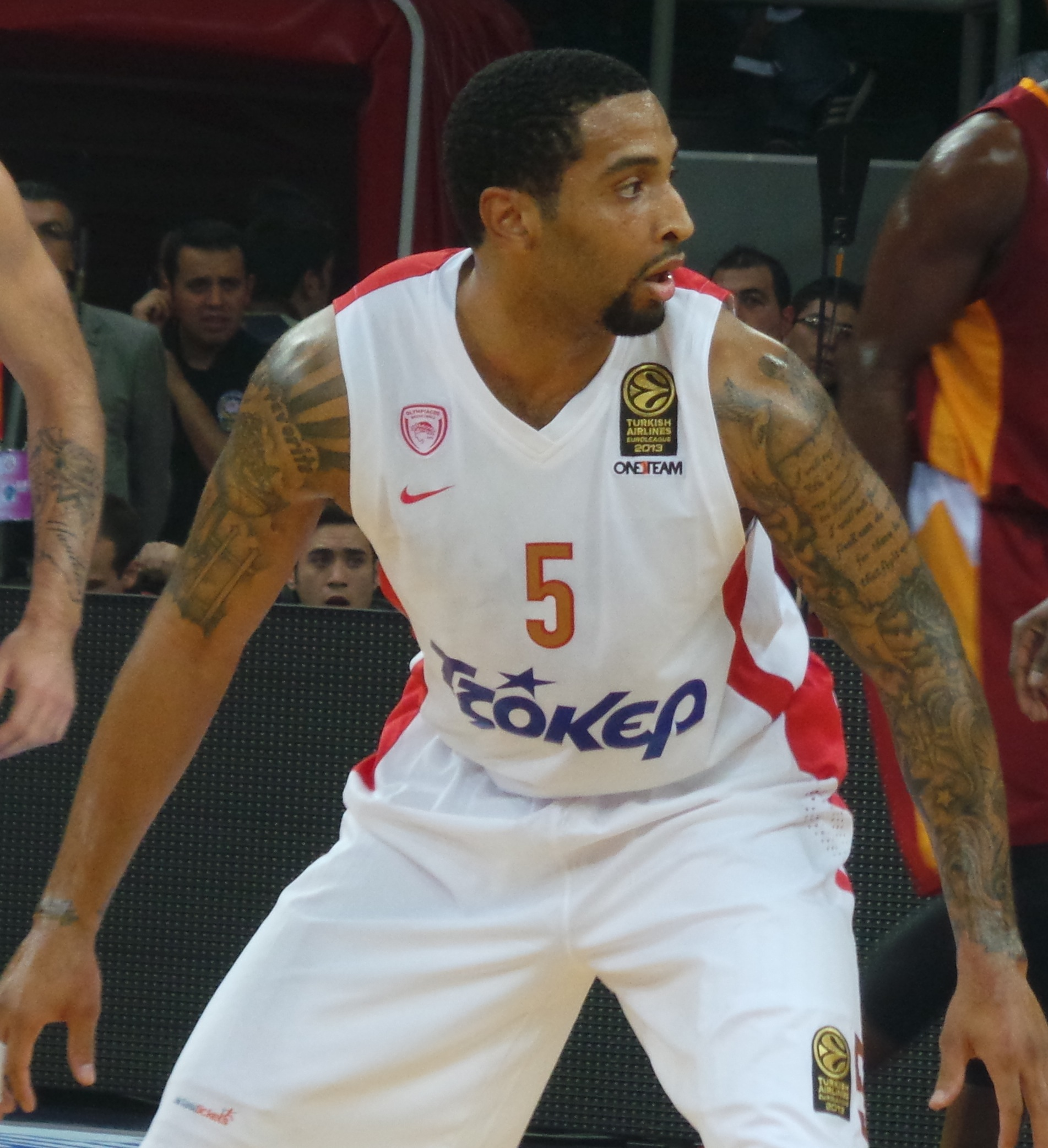
Acie Law wearing the golden-badged back-to-back European Champions 2012–2013 Olympiacos jersey

Giorgos Bartzokas coached Olympiacos to the 2013 Euroleague Championship

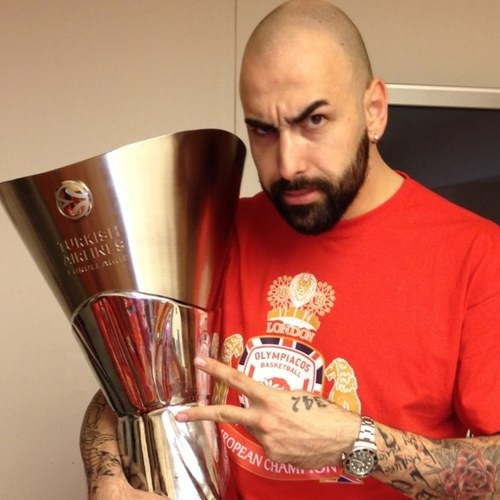
Pero Antić holding Olympiacos 2013 back-to-back Euroleague trophy

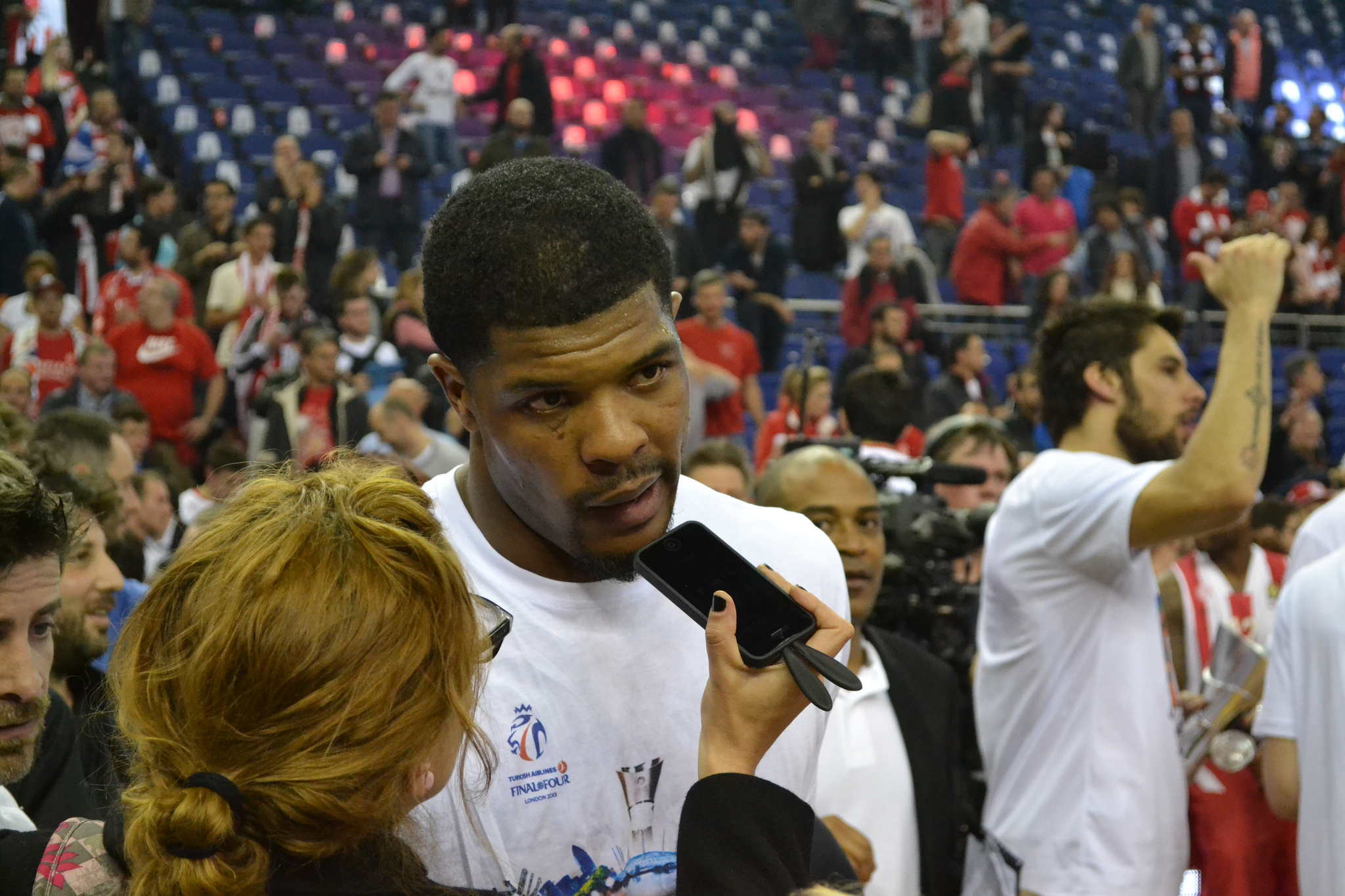
Kyle Hines shortly after Olympiacos 2013 back-to-back EuroLeague victory

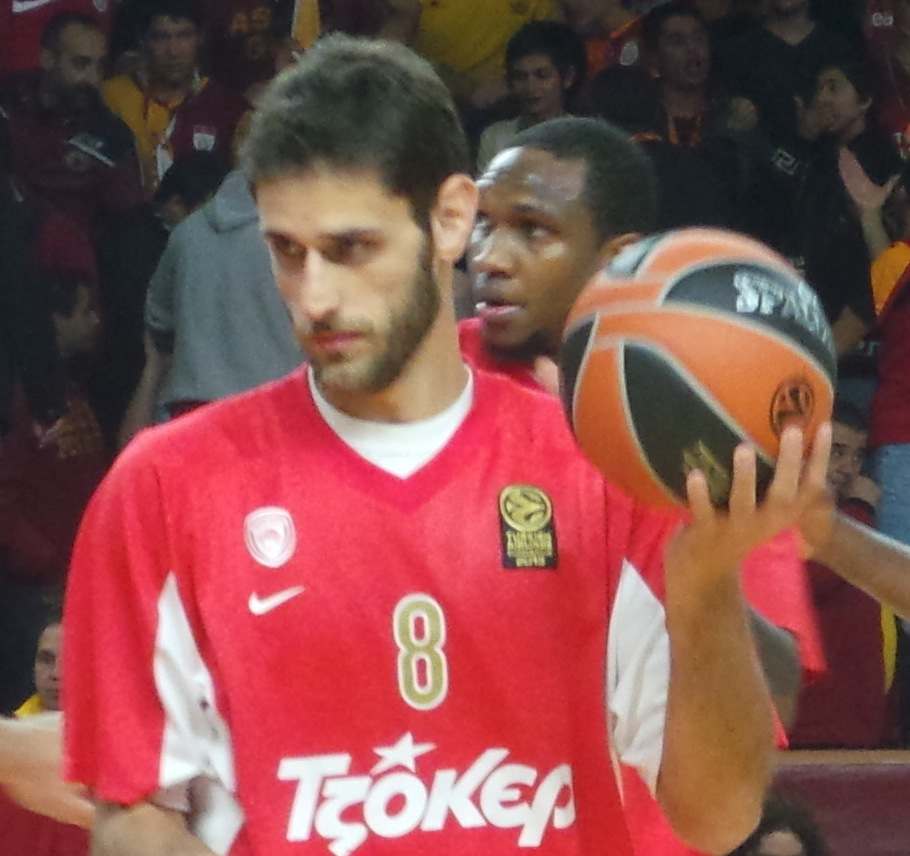
Stratos Perperoglou

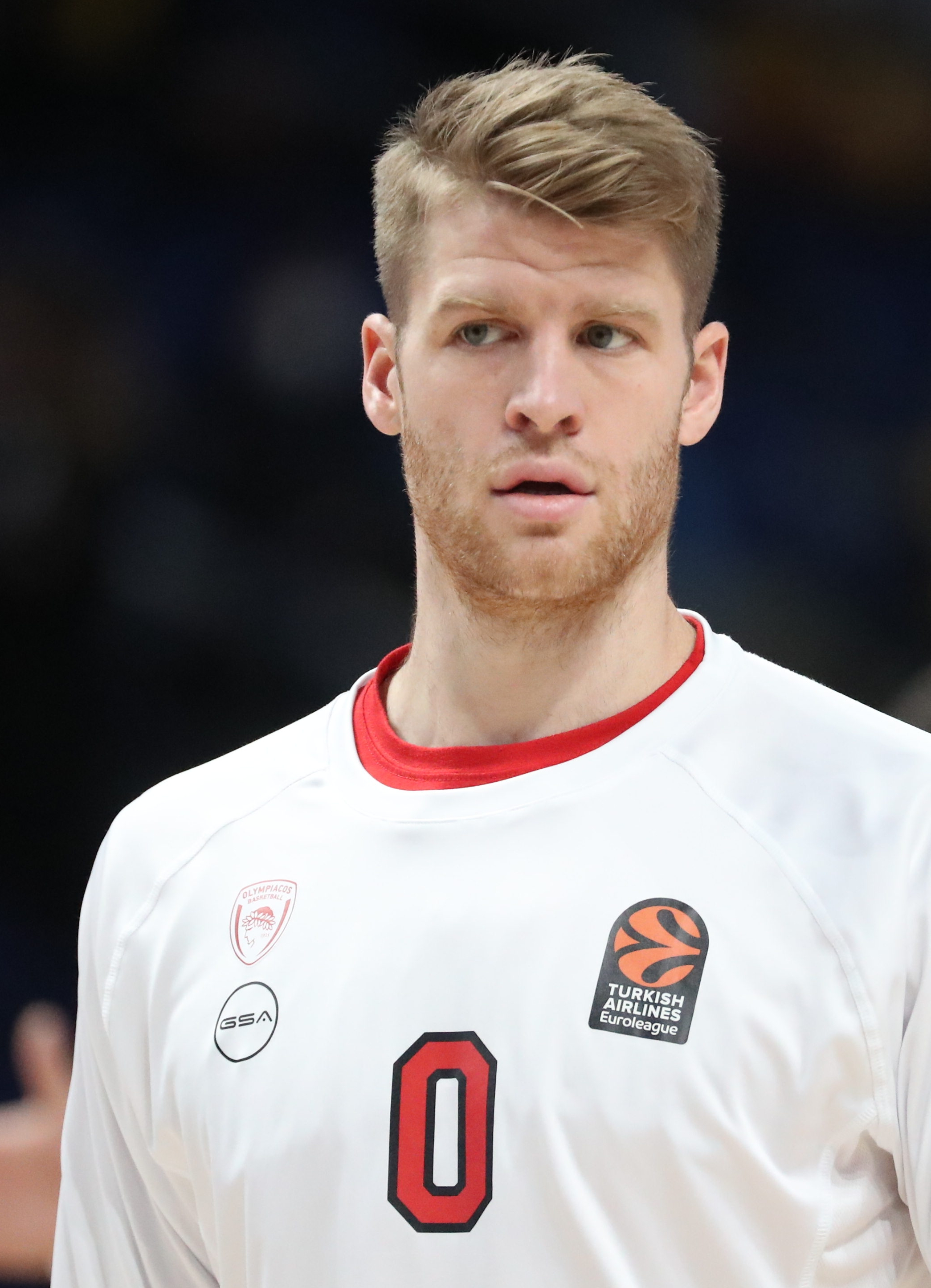
Thomas Walkup win the EuroLeague in 2026

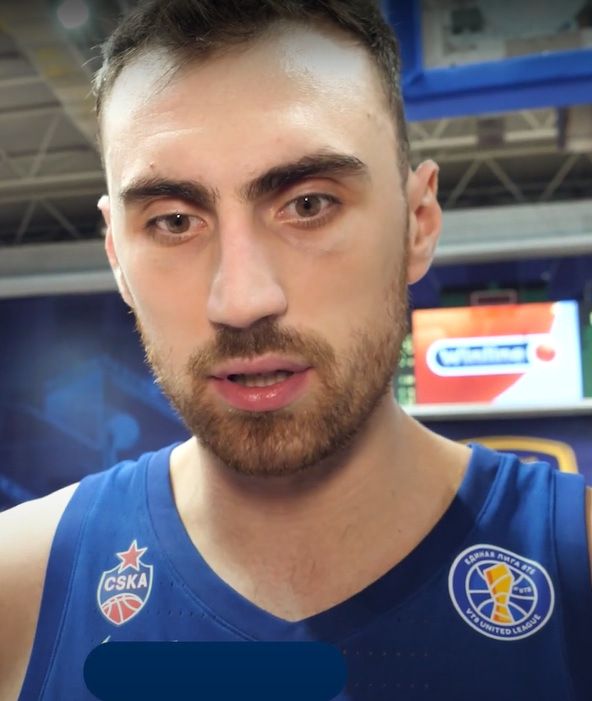
Nikola Milutinov EuroLeague champion with Olympiacos in 2025–26 season

=== Volleyball (men's) ===
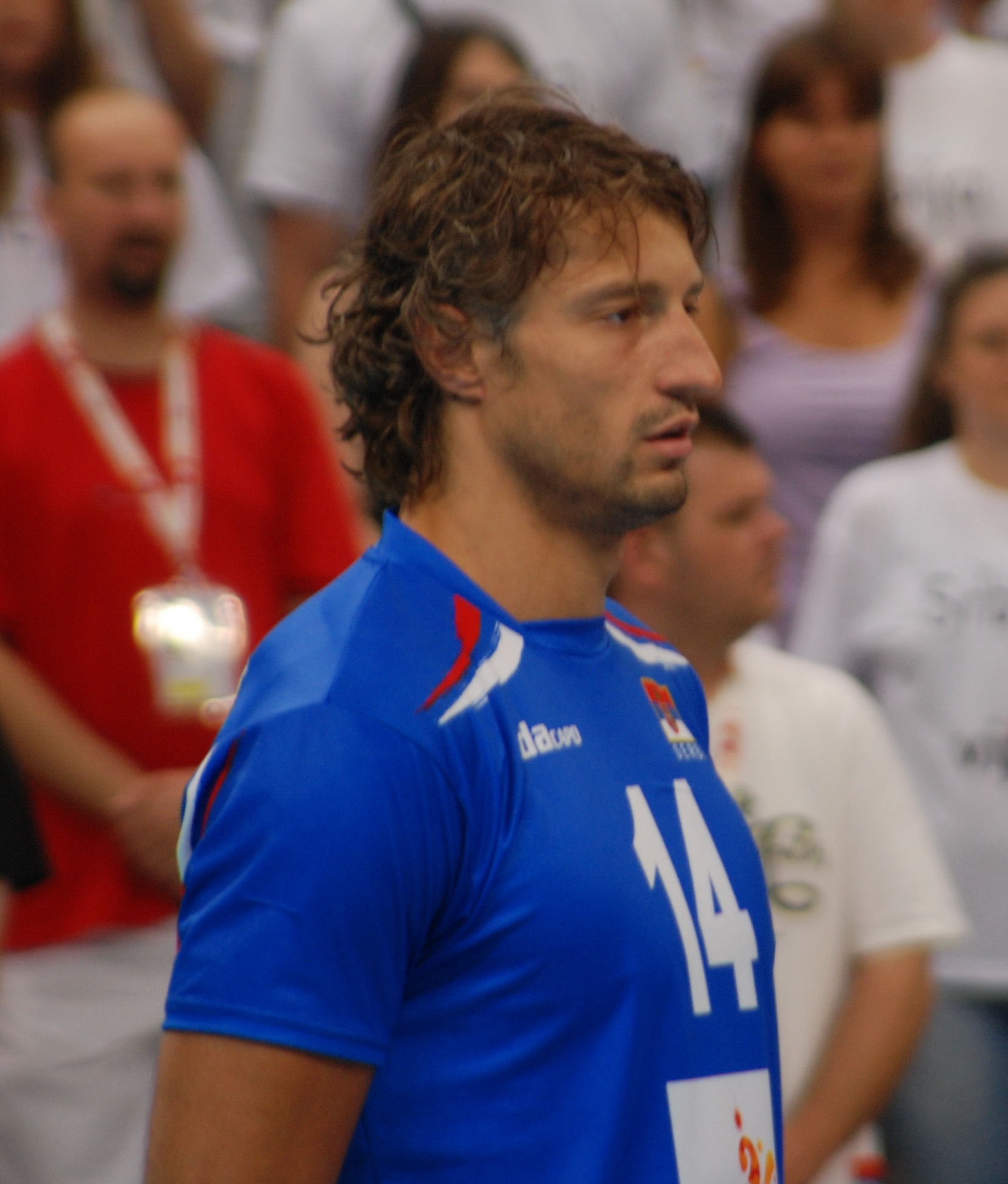
Ivan Miljković led the team to 2 Greek Championships in 2009 and 2010 and 1 Greek Cup in 2009

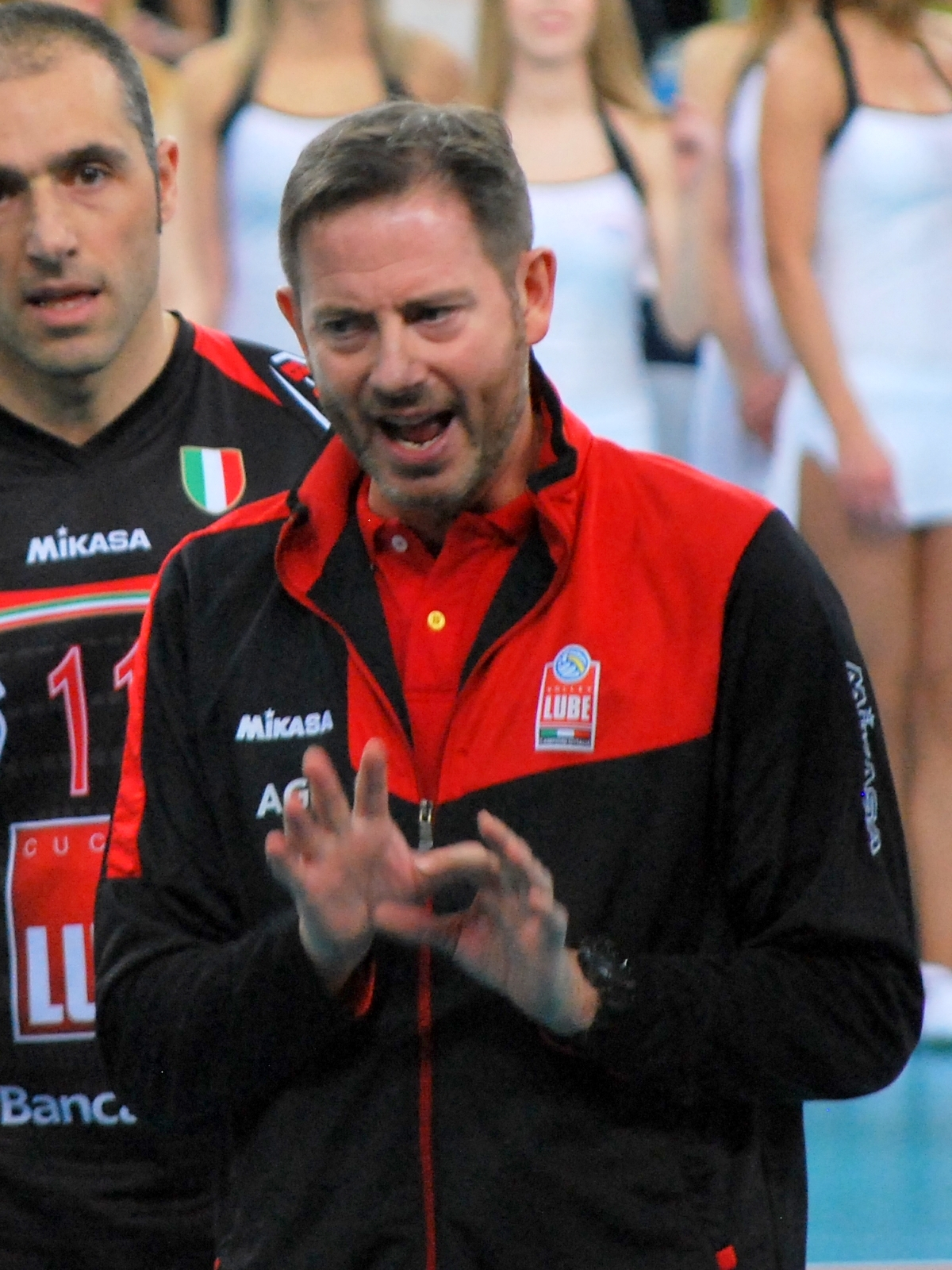
Alberto Giuliani led Olympiacos to the third European title in Olympiacos history, the 2023 CEV Challenge Cup

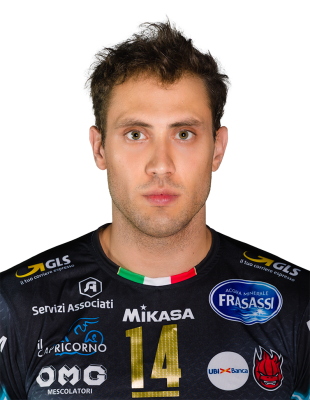
Aleksandar Atanasijević

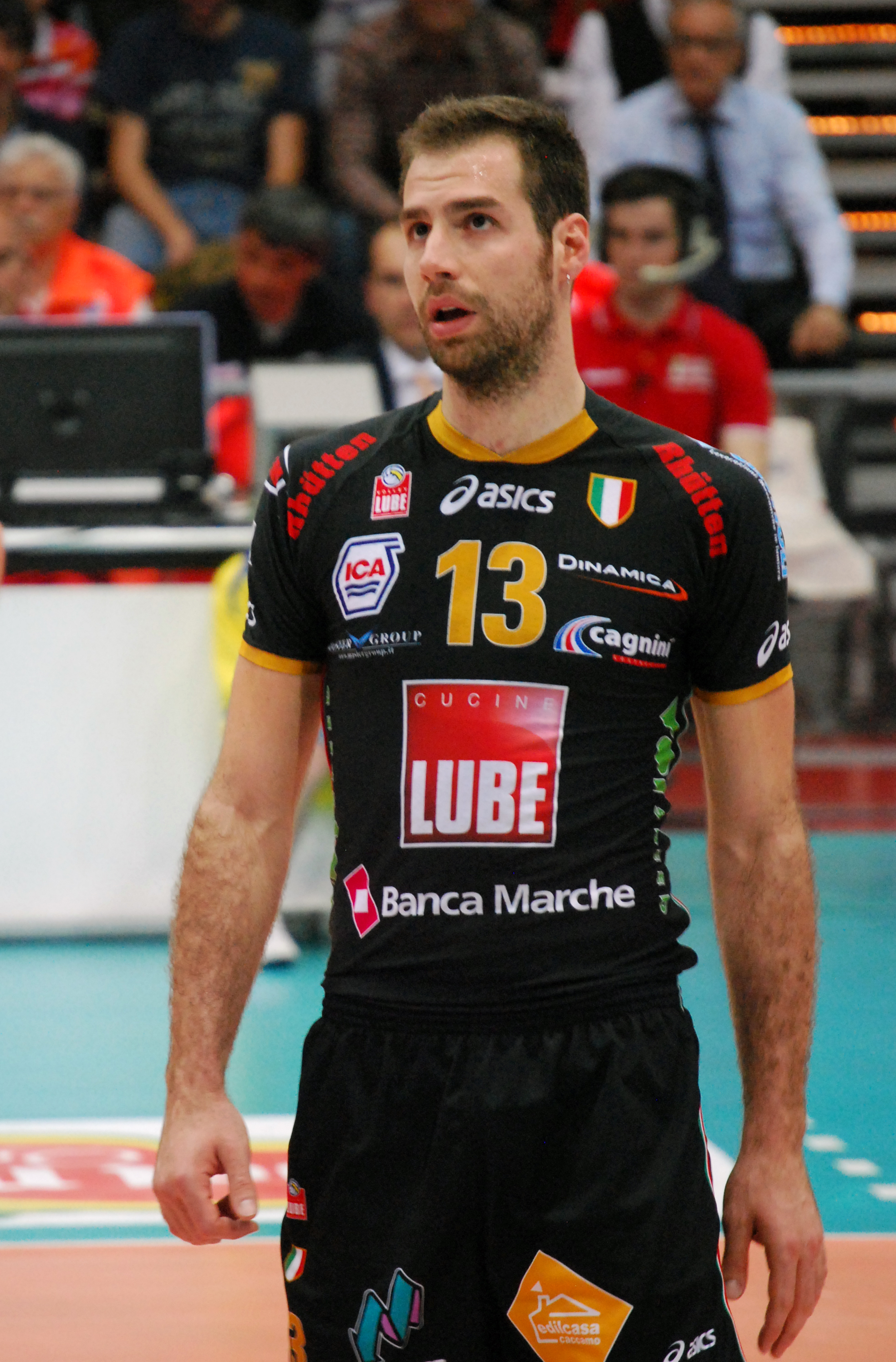
Dragan Travica captained Olympiacos to the 2023 CEV Challenge Cup, winning the Finals MVP award

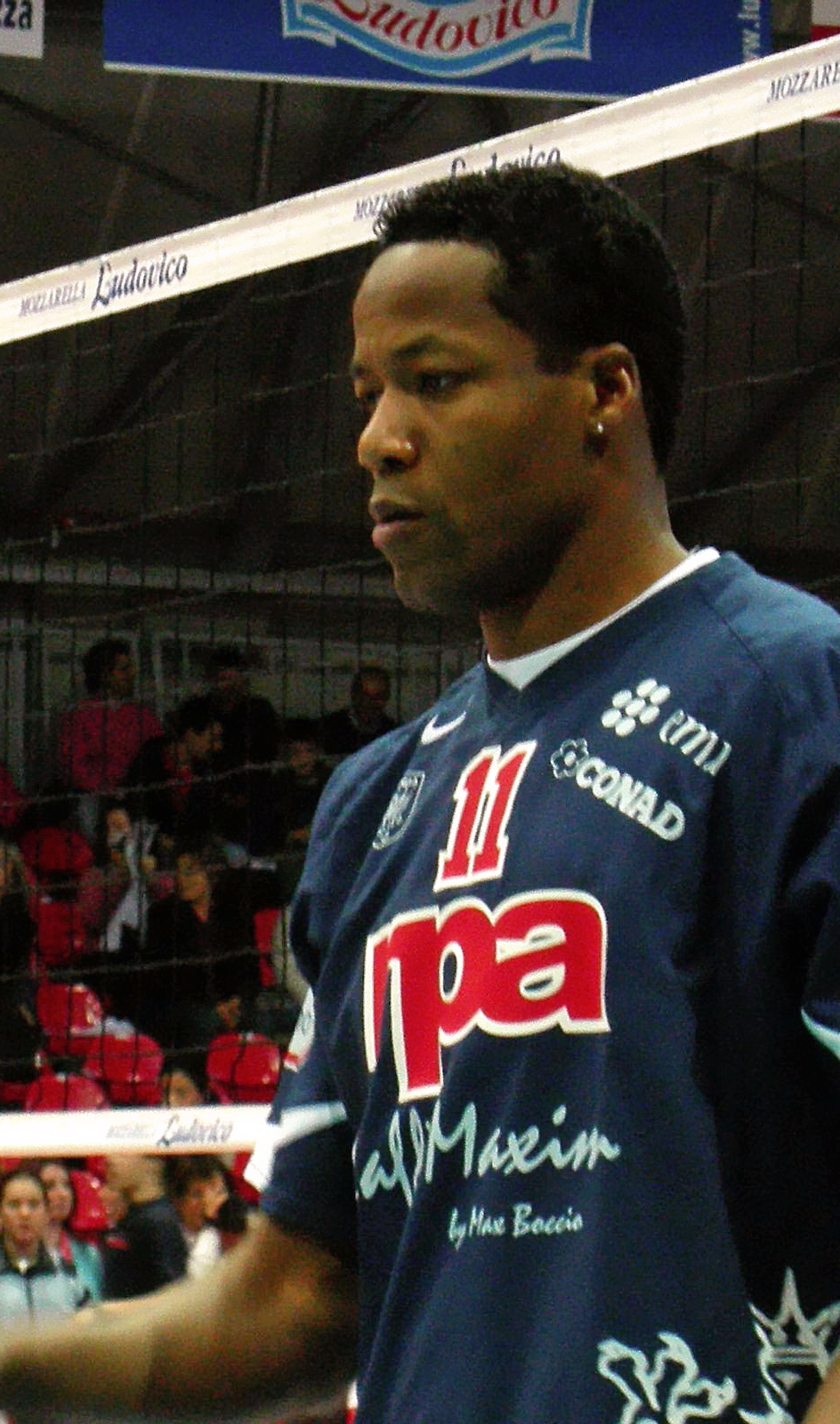
Osvaldo Hernández led Olympiacos to the 1996 CEV Cup

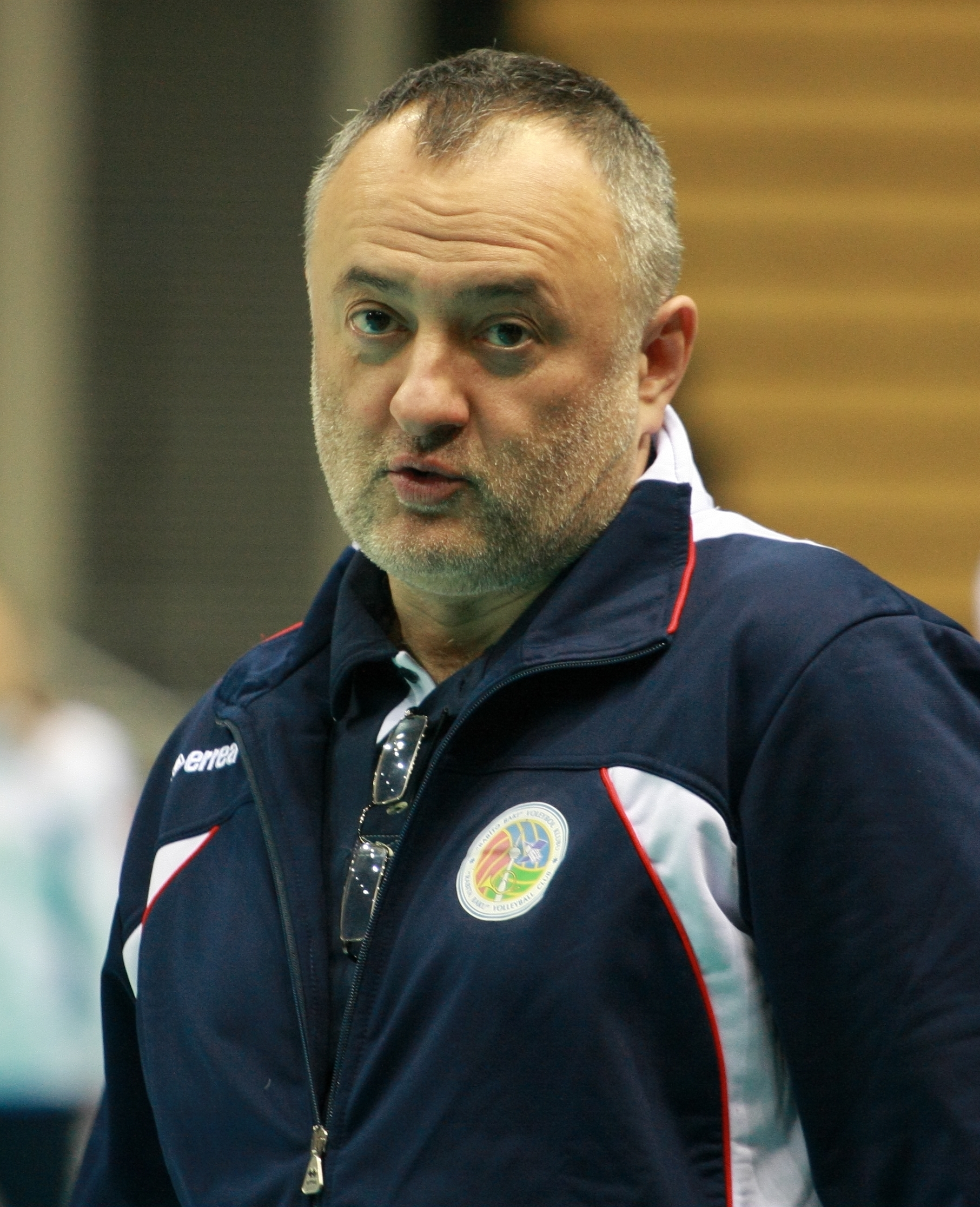
Zoran Gajić

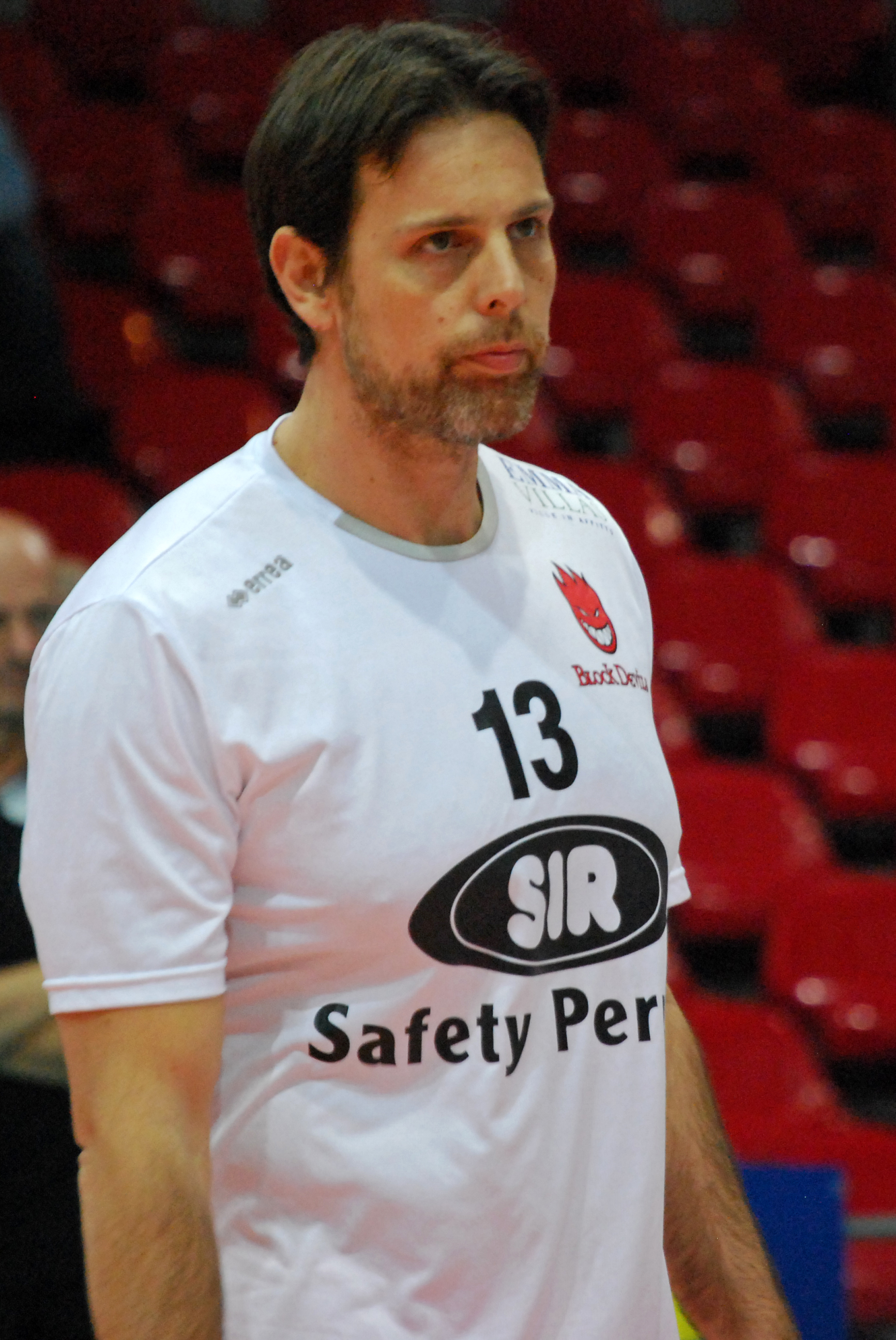
Goran Vujević

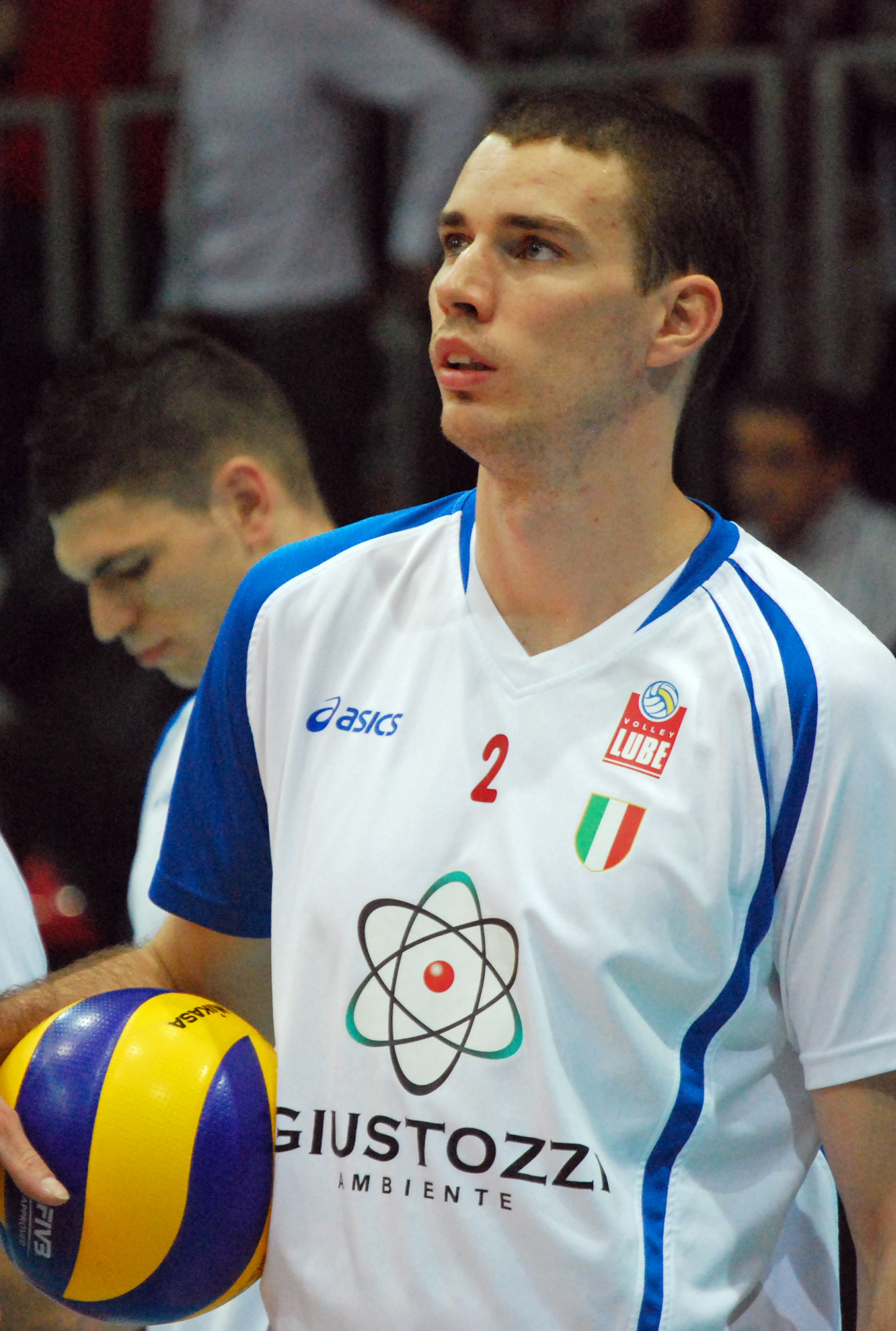
Alen Pajenk won the 2022–23 CEV Challenge Cup with Olympiacos

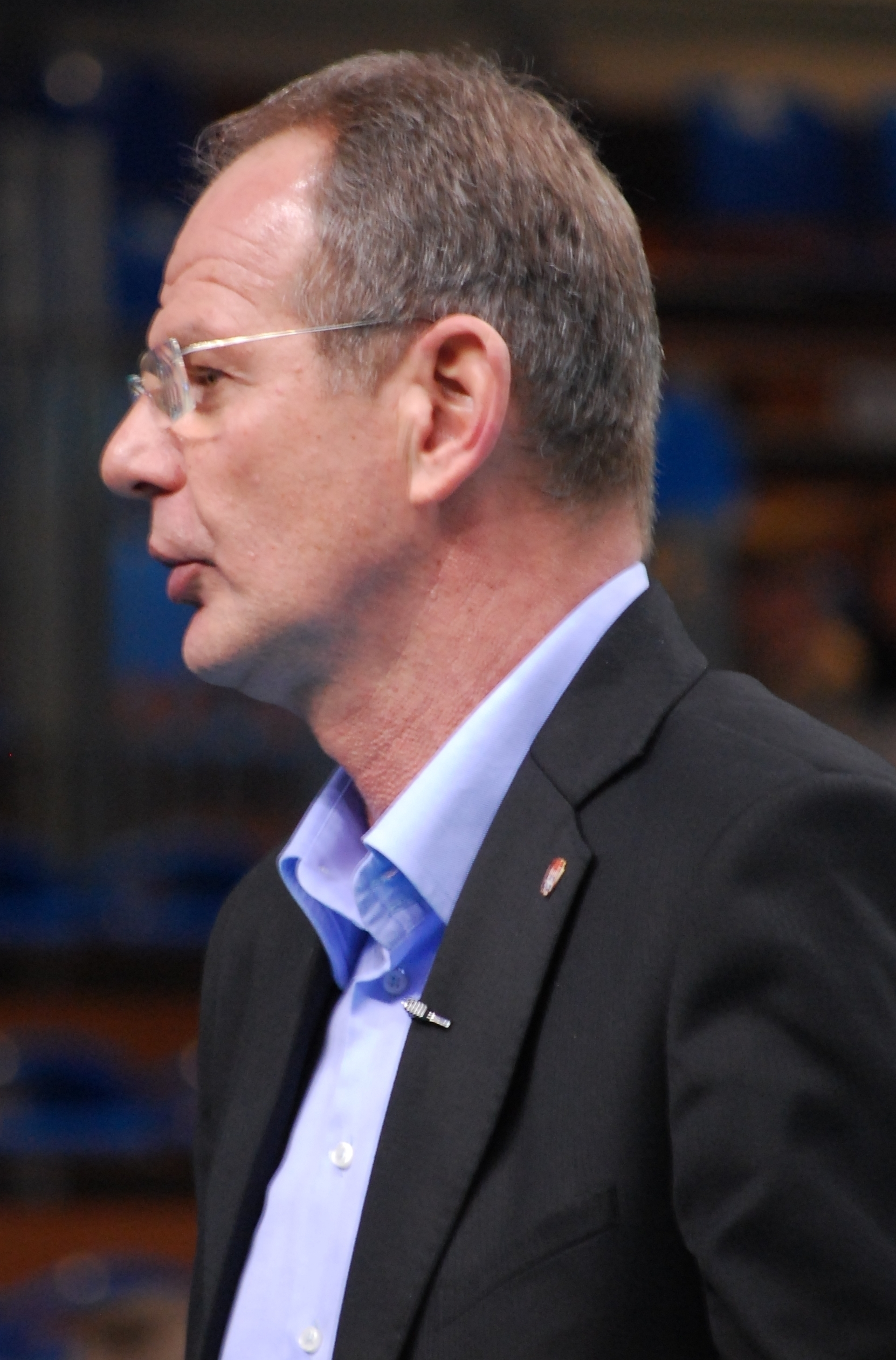
Ljubomir Travica

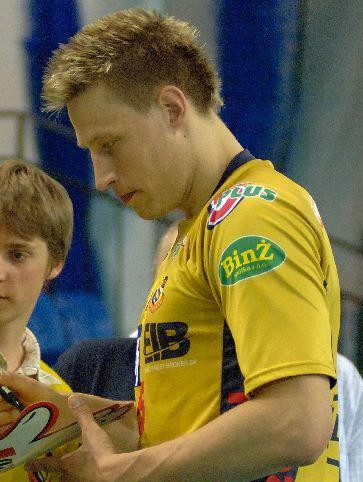
Janne Heikkinen reached the CEV Champions League final in 2002 with Olympiacos

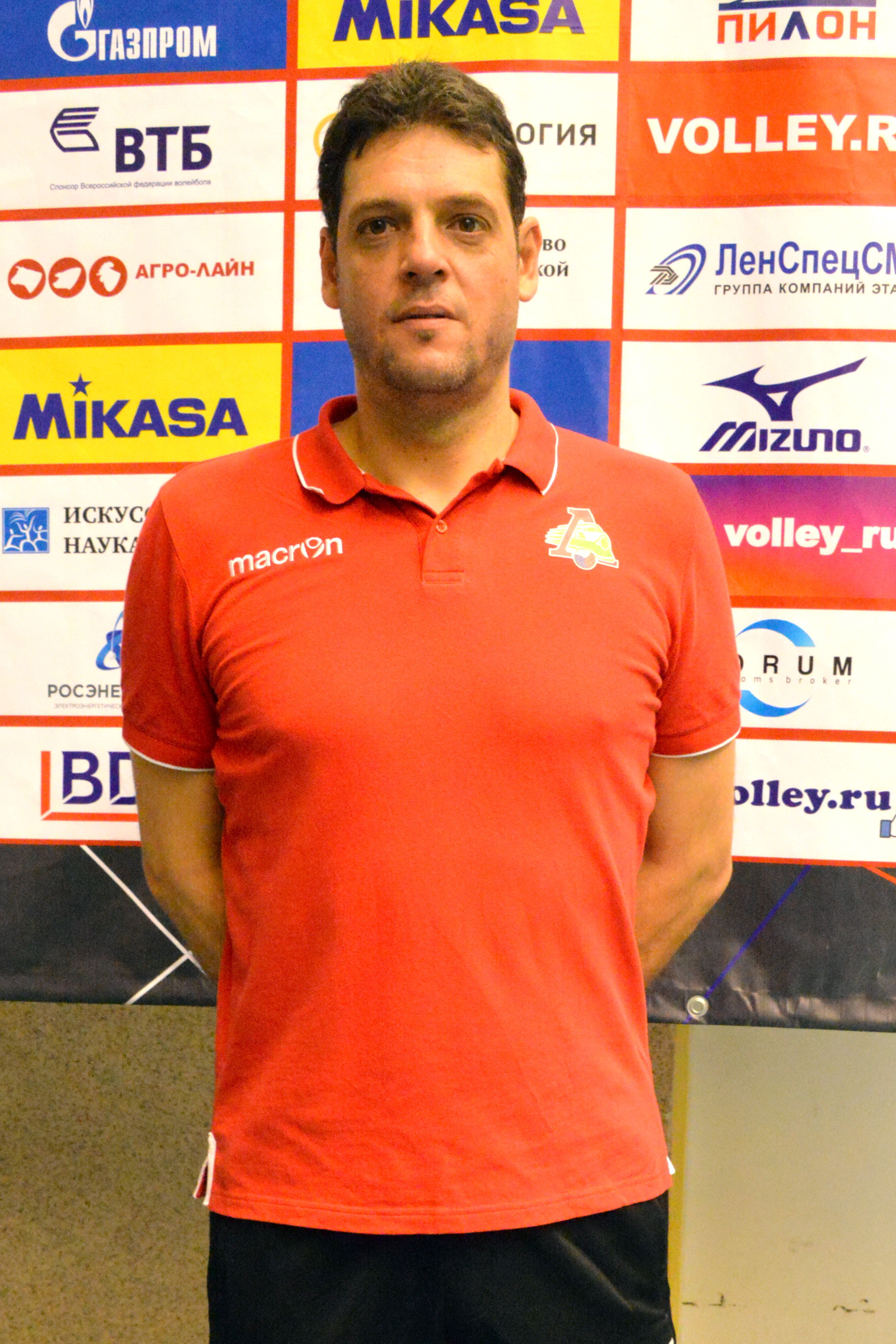
Plamen Konstantinov

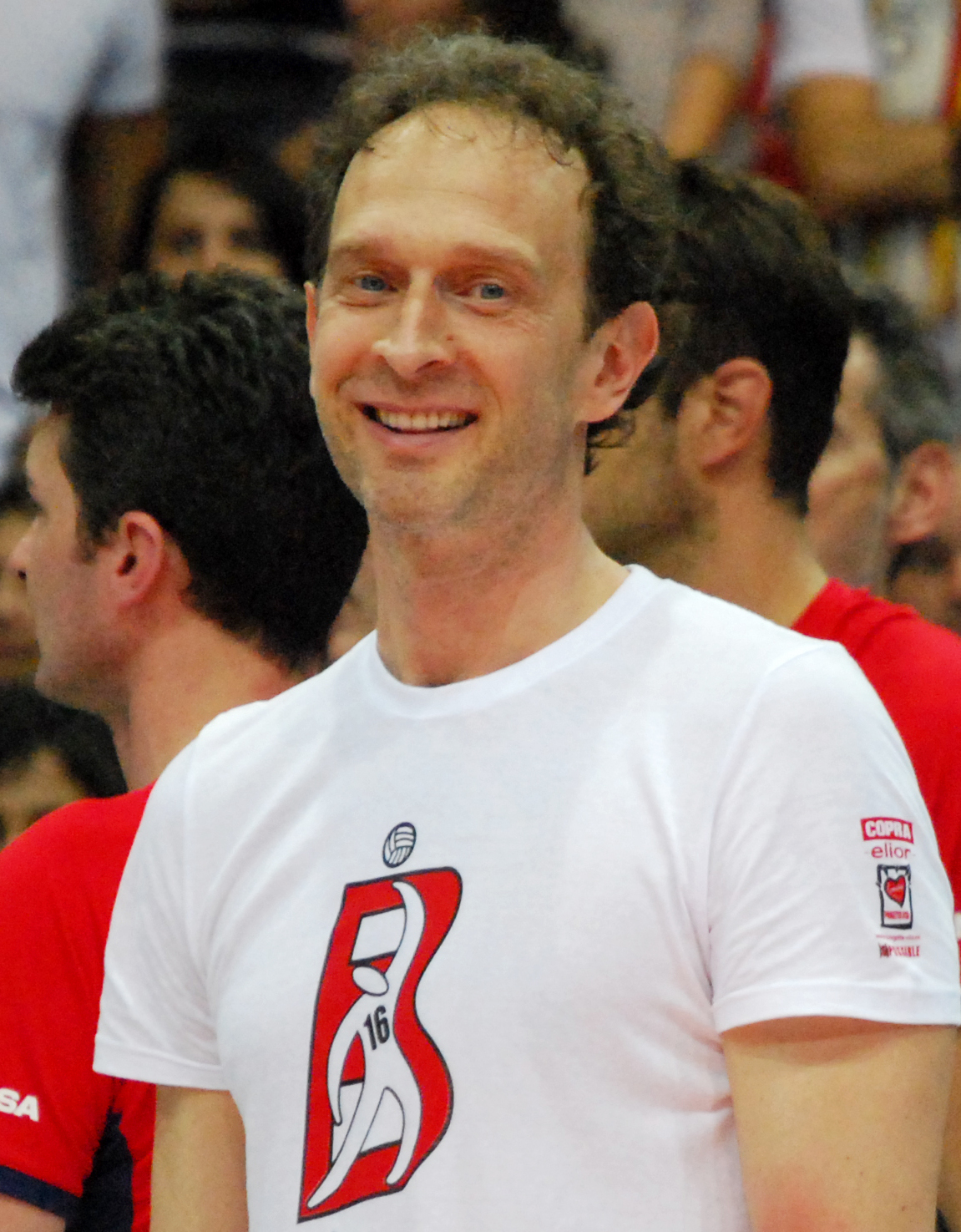
Lorenzo Bernardi

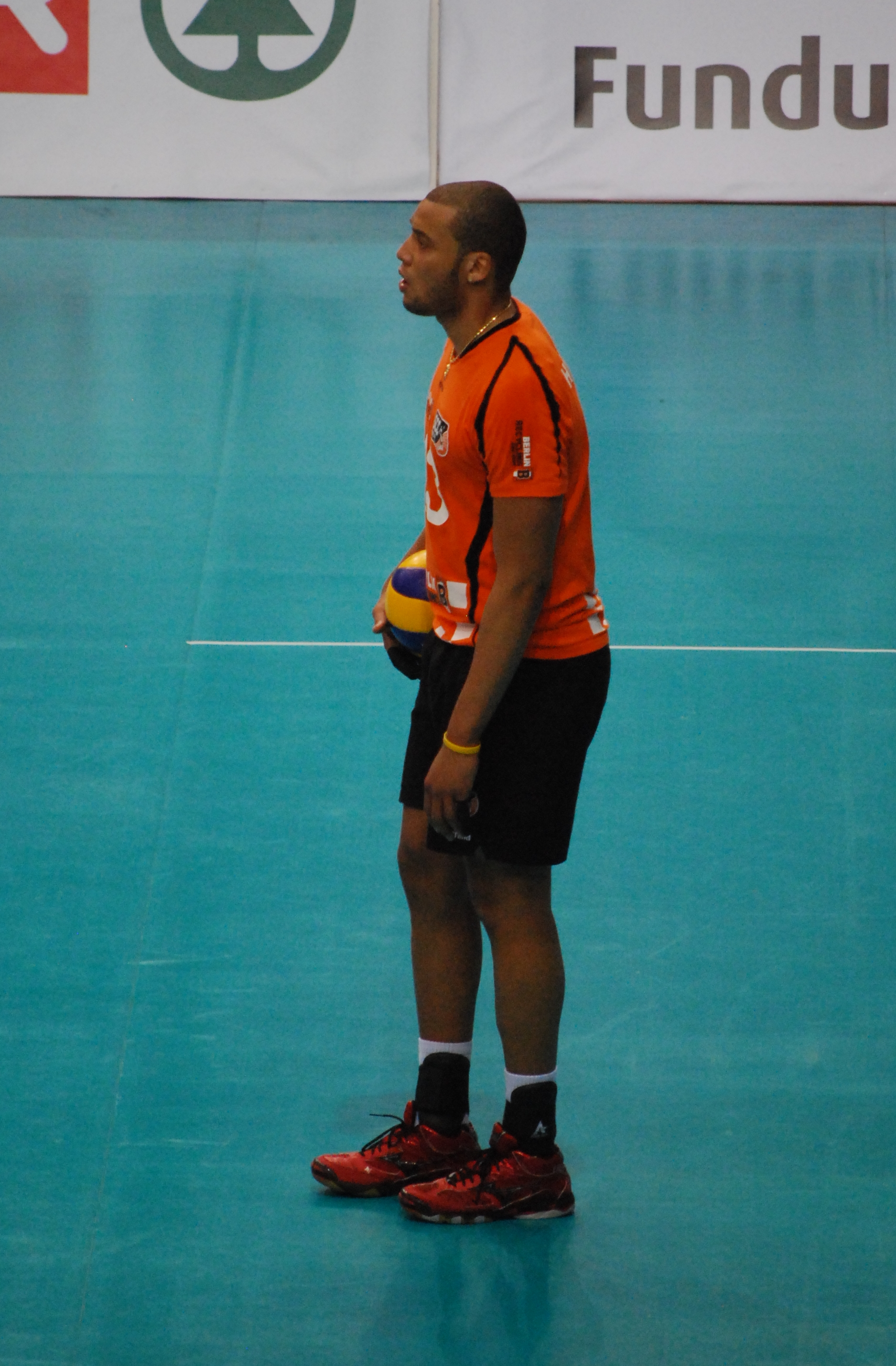
Salvador Hidalgo Oliva, key member of the Olympiacos team that won the 2022–23 CEV Challenge Cup

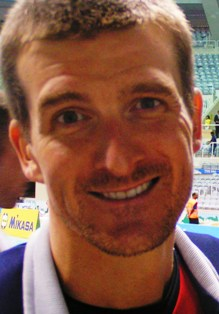
Tom Hoff won the double in 2009 with Olympiacos

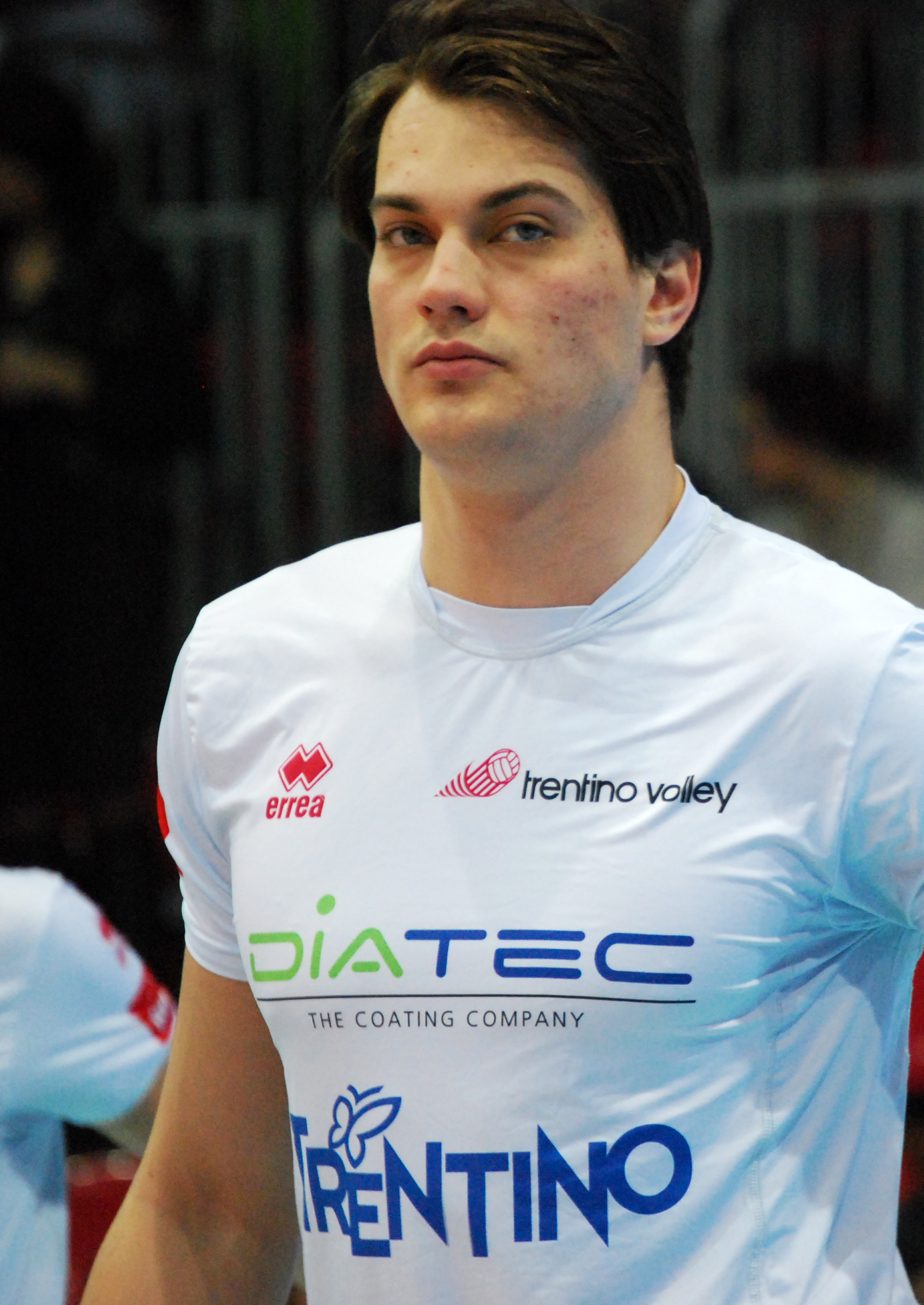
Mitar Tzourits won 4 consecutive Greek Championships, 2 Greek Cups and one Greek Super Cup with Olympiacos

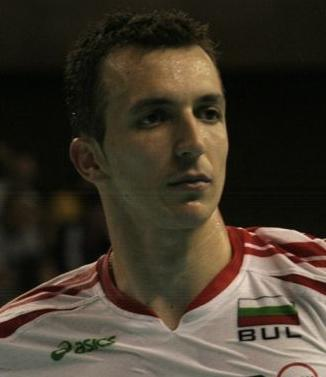
Boyan Yordanov won 6 Greek titles (2 Greek Championships, 2 Greek Cups and 2 Greek League Cups) with the club

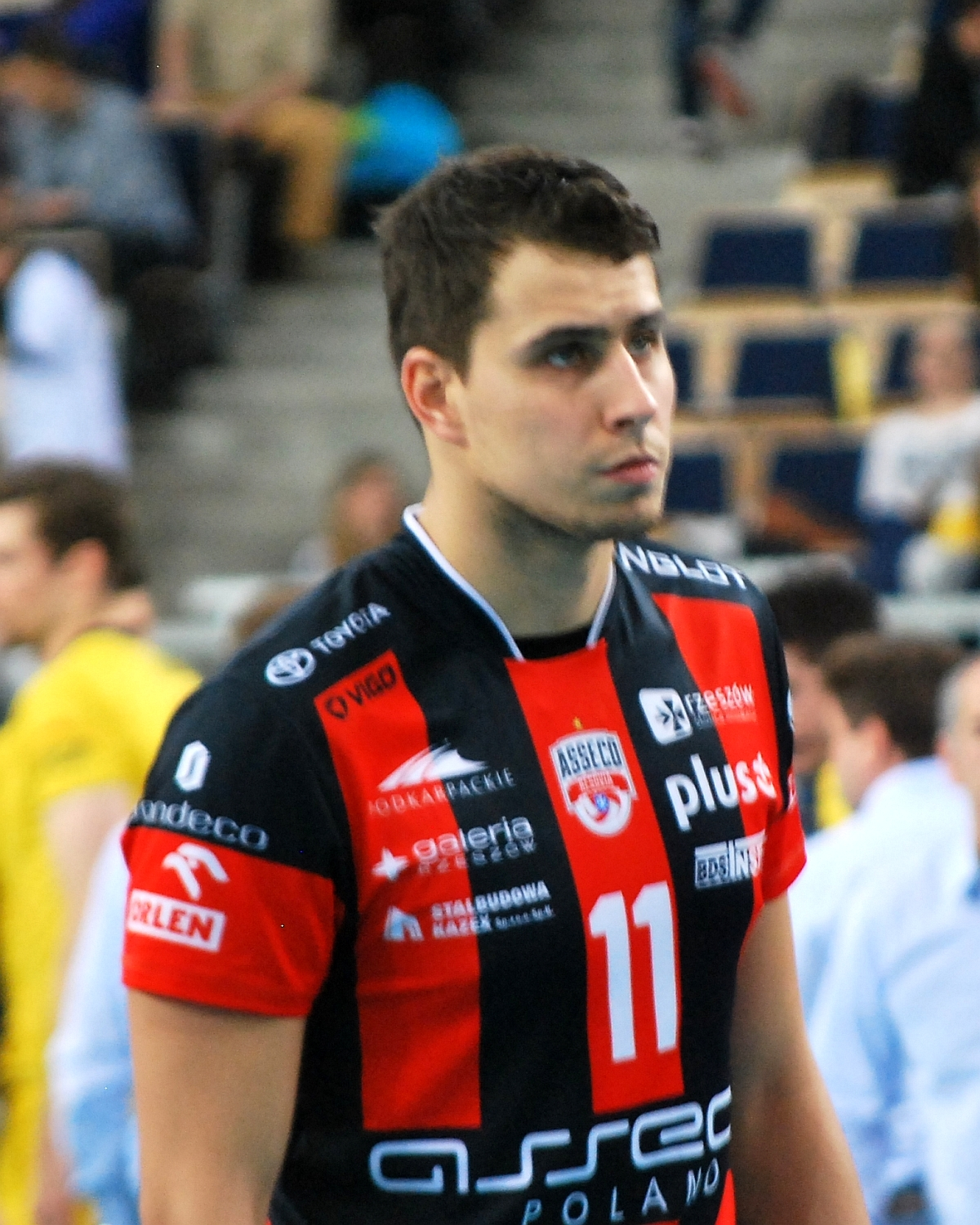
Fabian Drzyzga led the club to the final of the CEV Challenge Cup in 2018 and won the Greek Championship and the Greek League Cup with Olympiacos

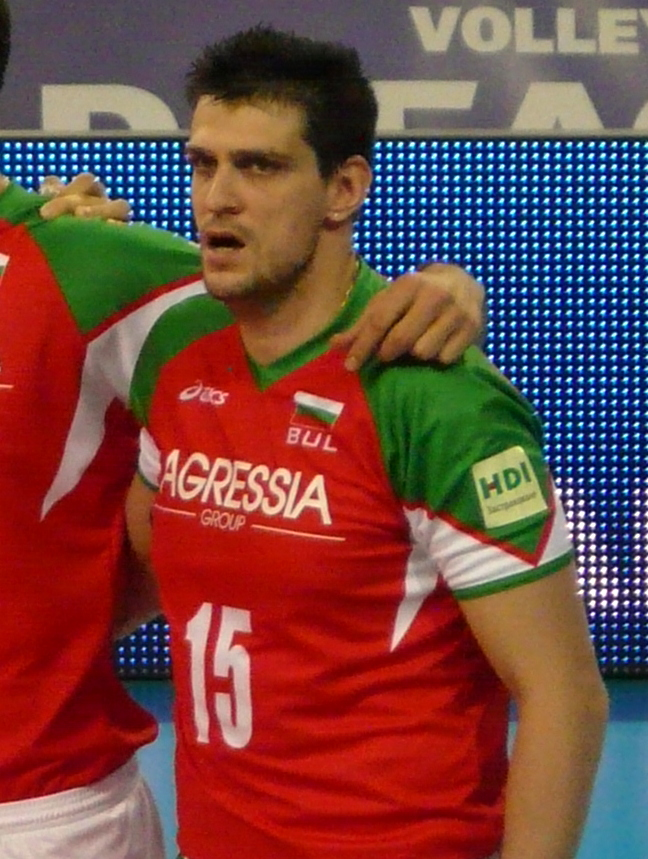
Todor Aleksiev

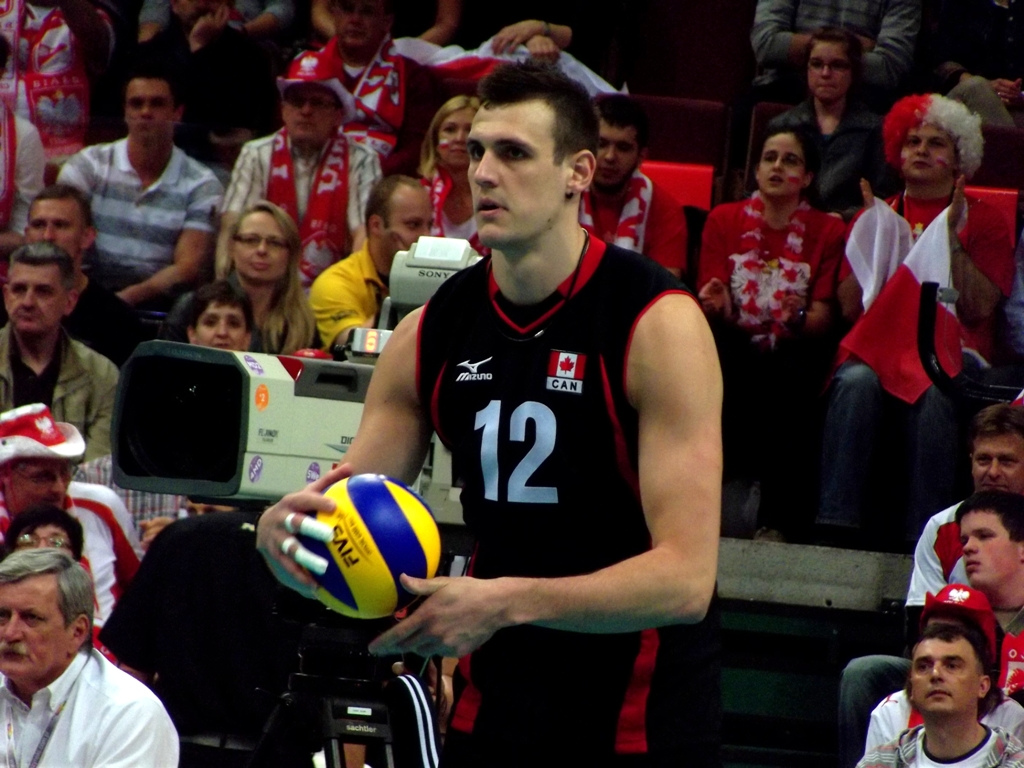
Gavin Schmitt

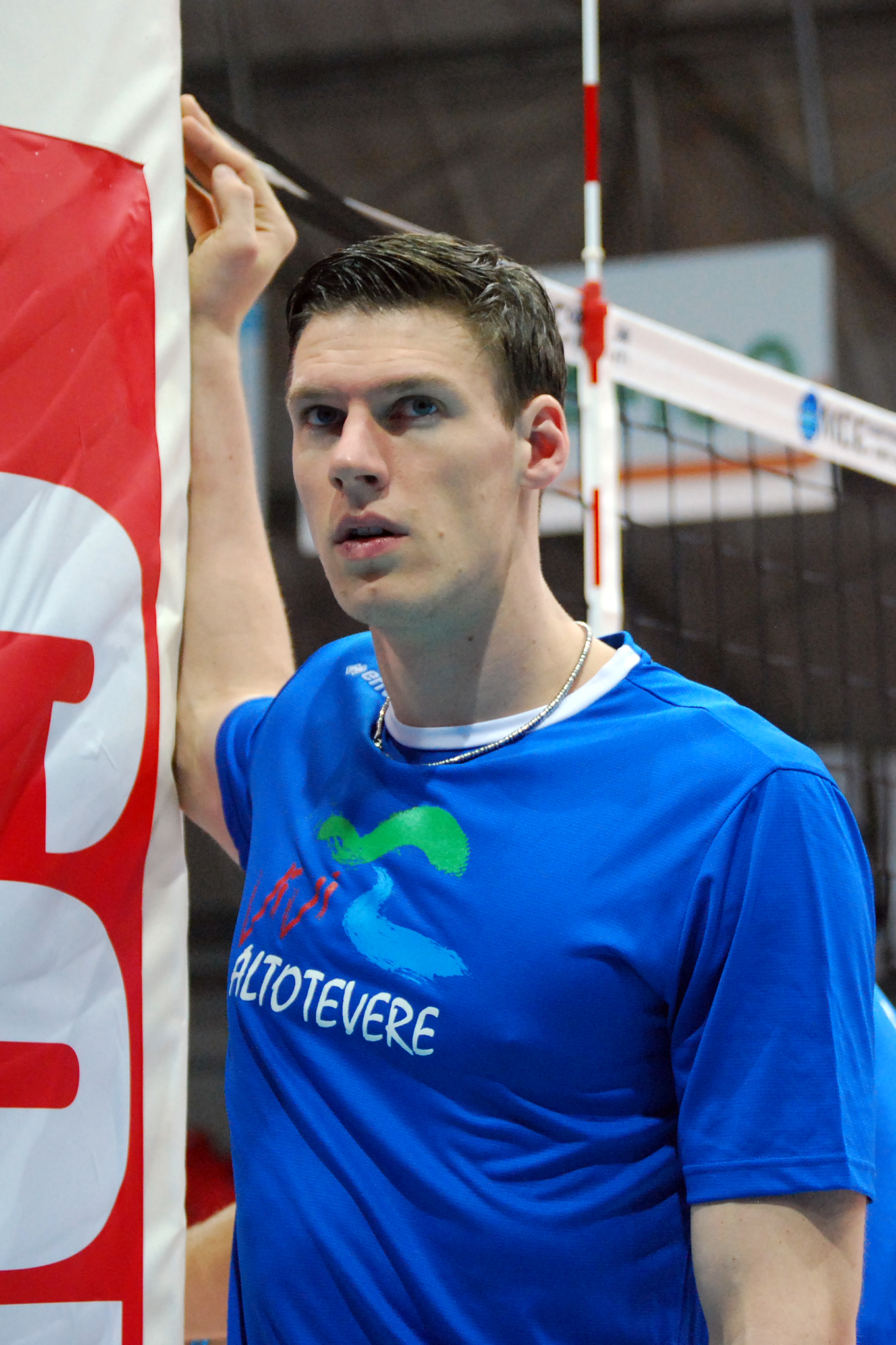
Marcus Böhme

=== Water Polo (men's) ===
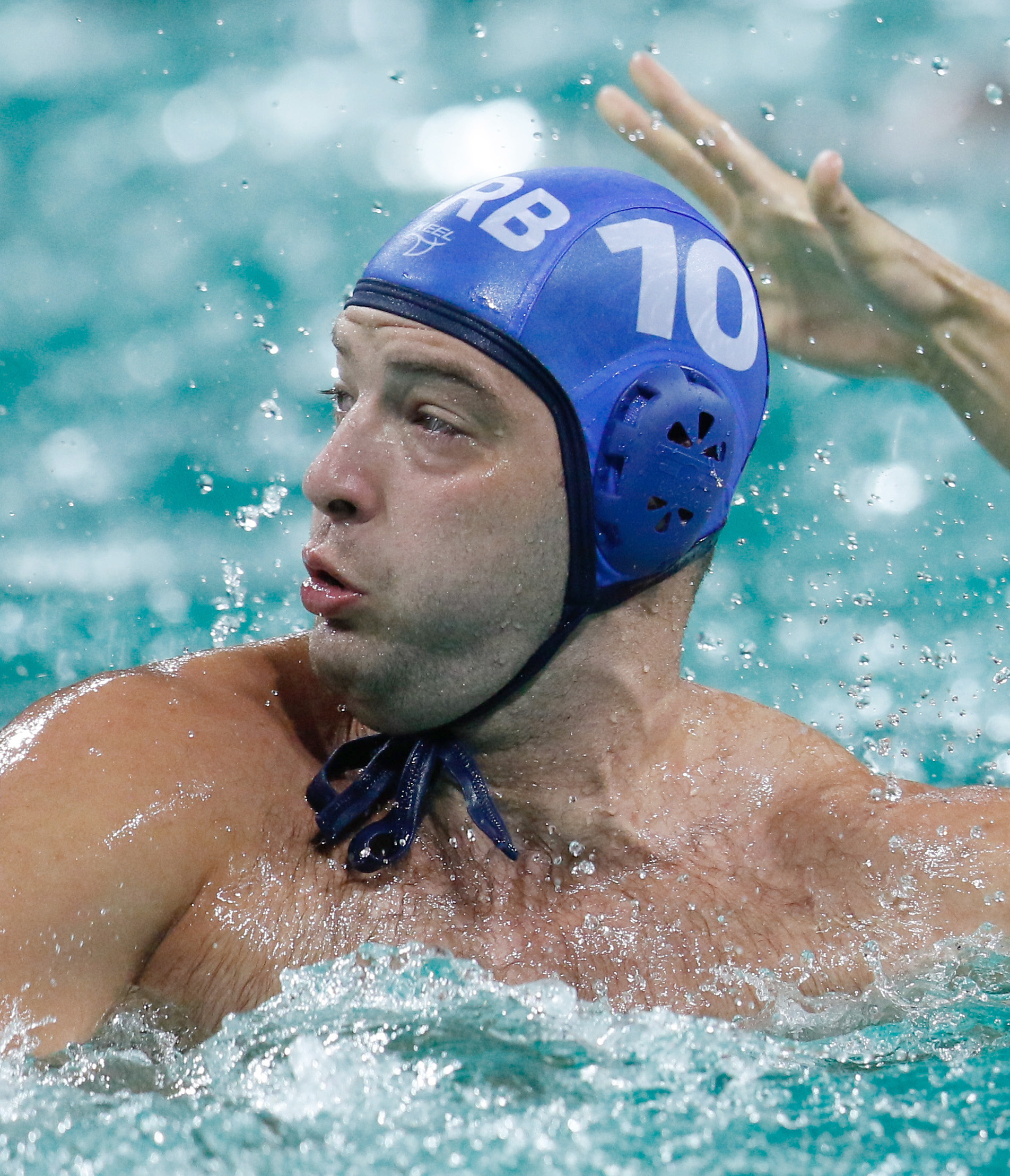
Filip Filipović, World Player of the Year in 2011, 2014 and 2021 and Best European Player of the Year in 2009, 2014, 2016, 2018 and 2021

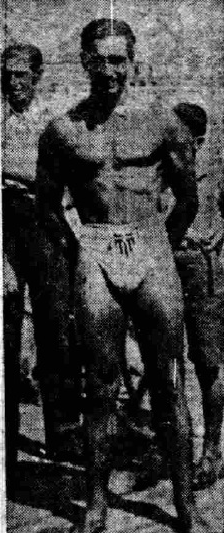
Andreas Kourachanis

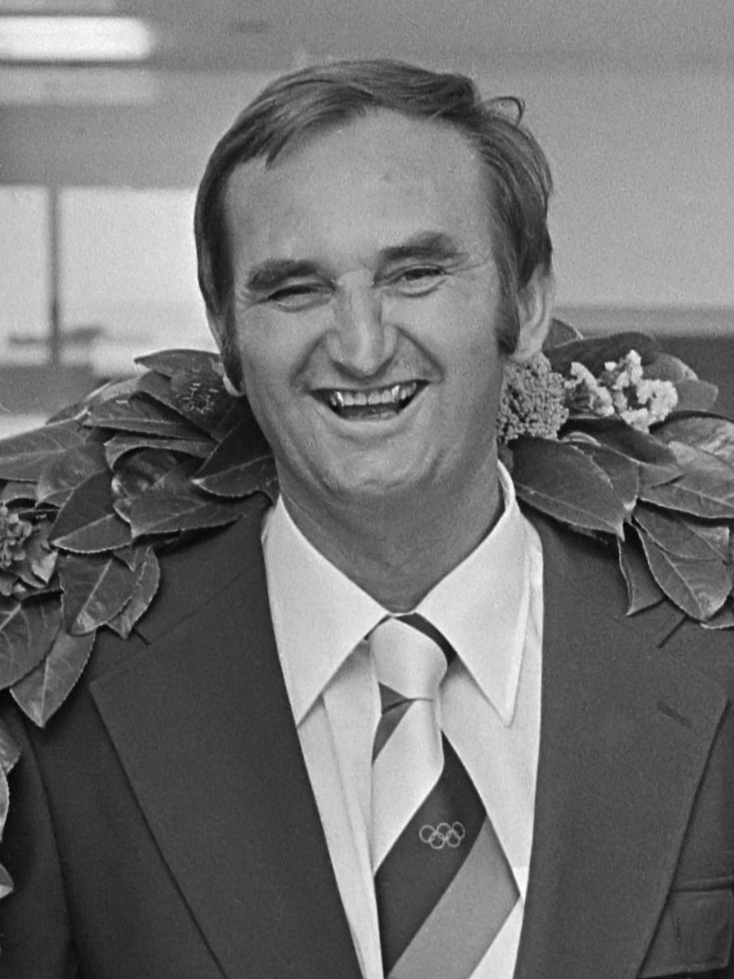
Hall of Fame coach Ivo Trumbić led Olympiacos to the 1971 title.

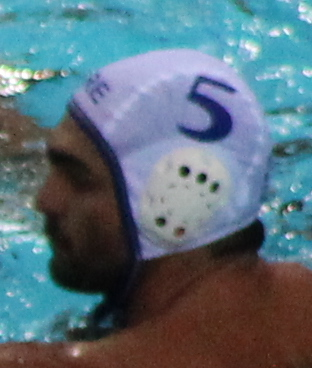
Thodoris Chatzitheodorou, European Player of the Year in 2001

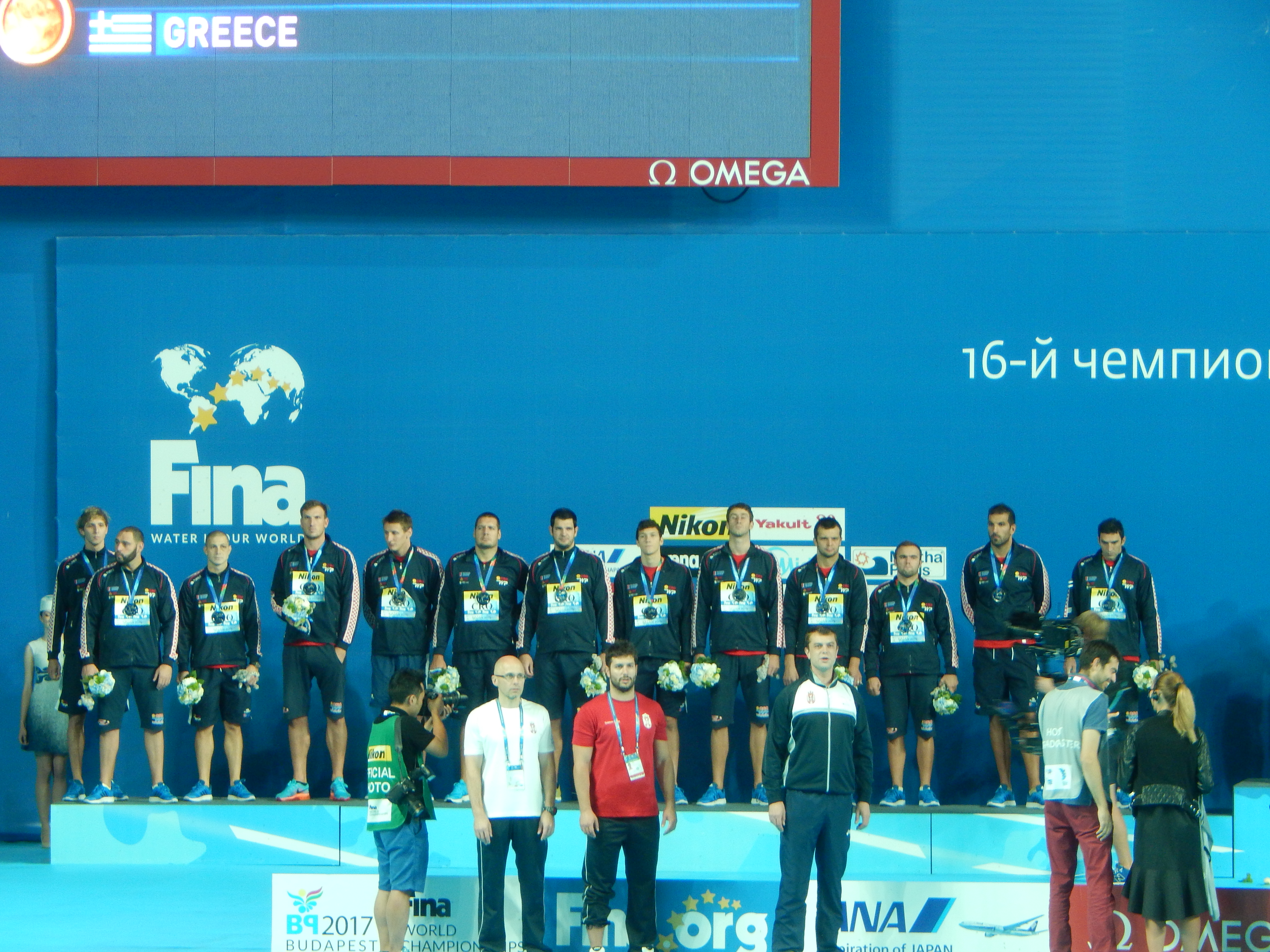
Marko Bijac European Player of the Year in 2017 and one of the Greatest Goalkeepers in the history of the sport.

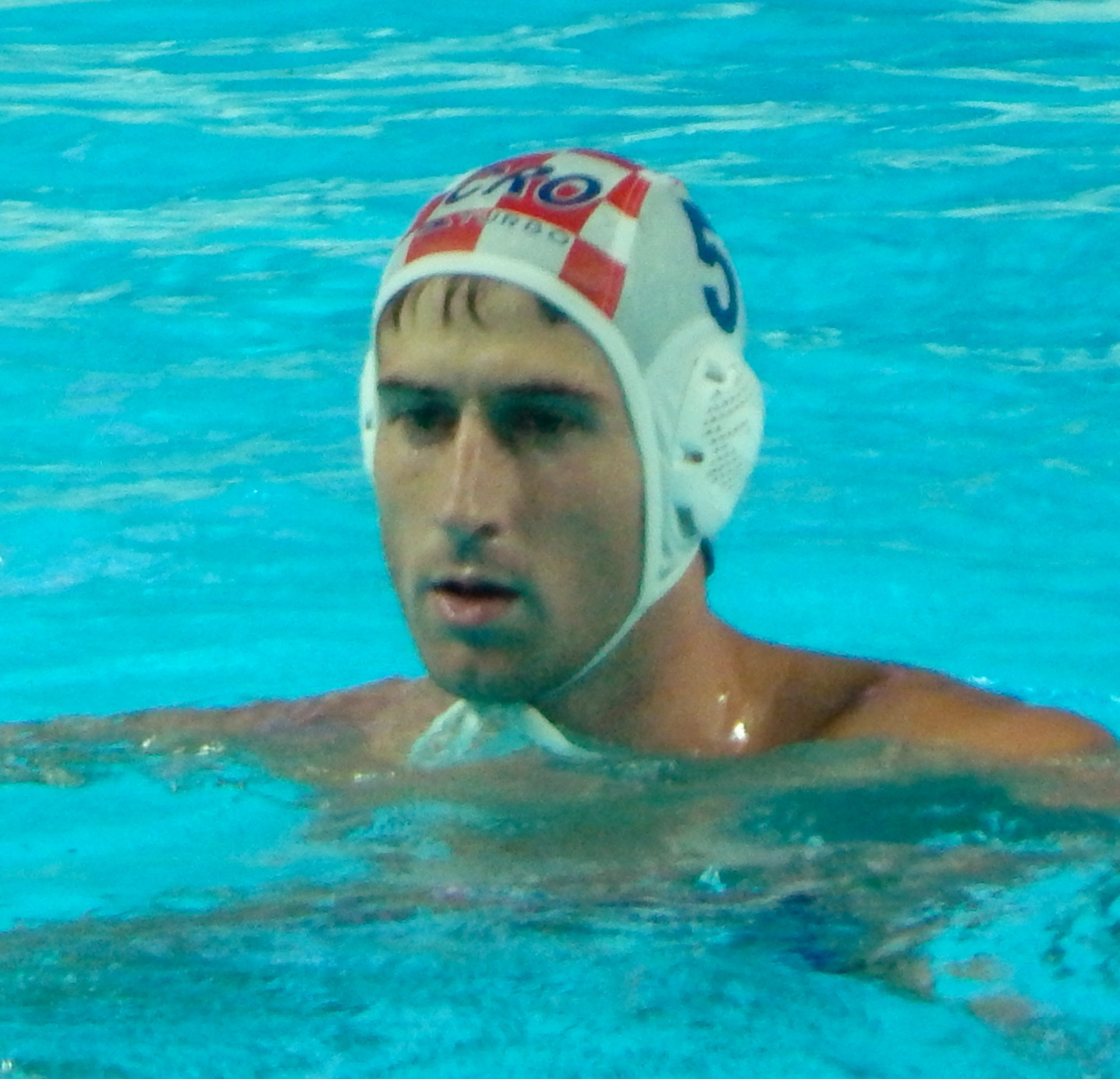
Maro Joković, World Player of the Year in 2012

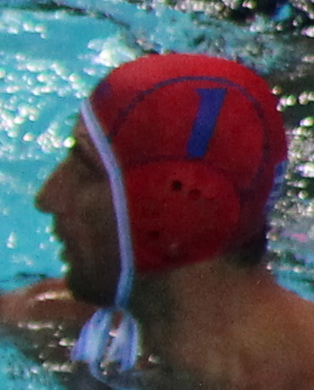
Nikos Deligiannis

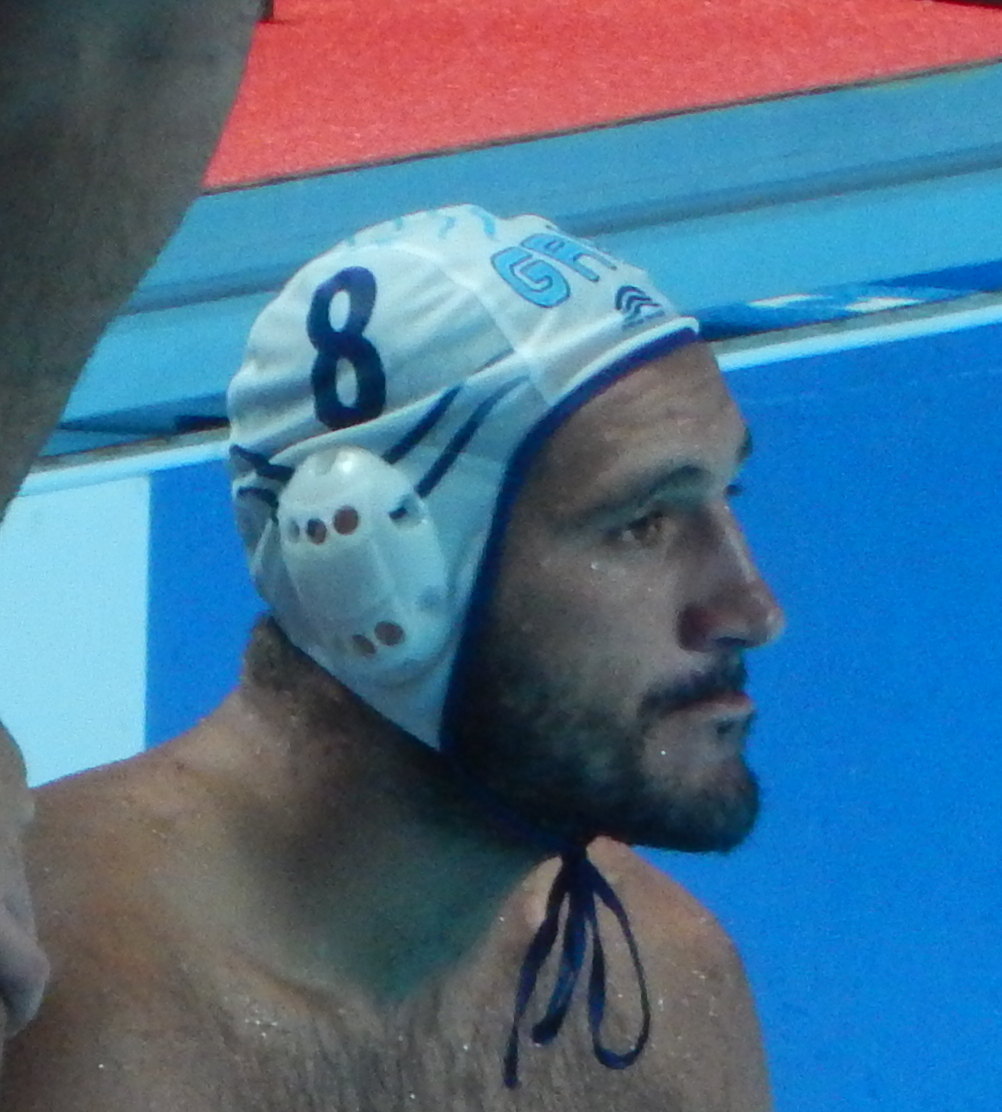
Vangelis Delakas

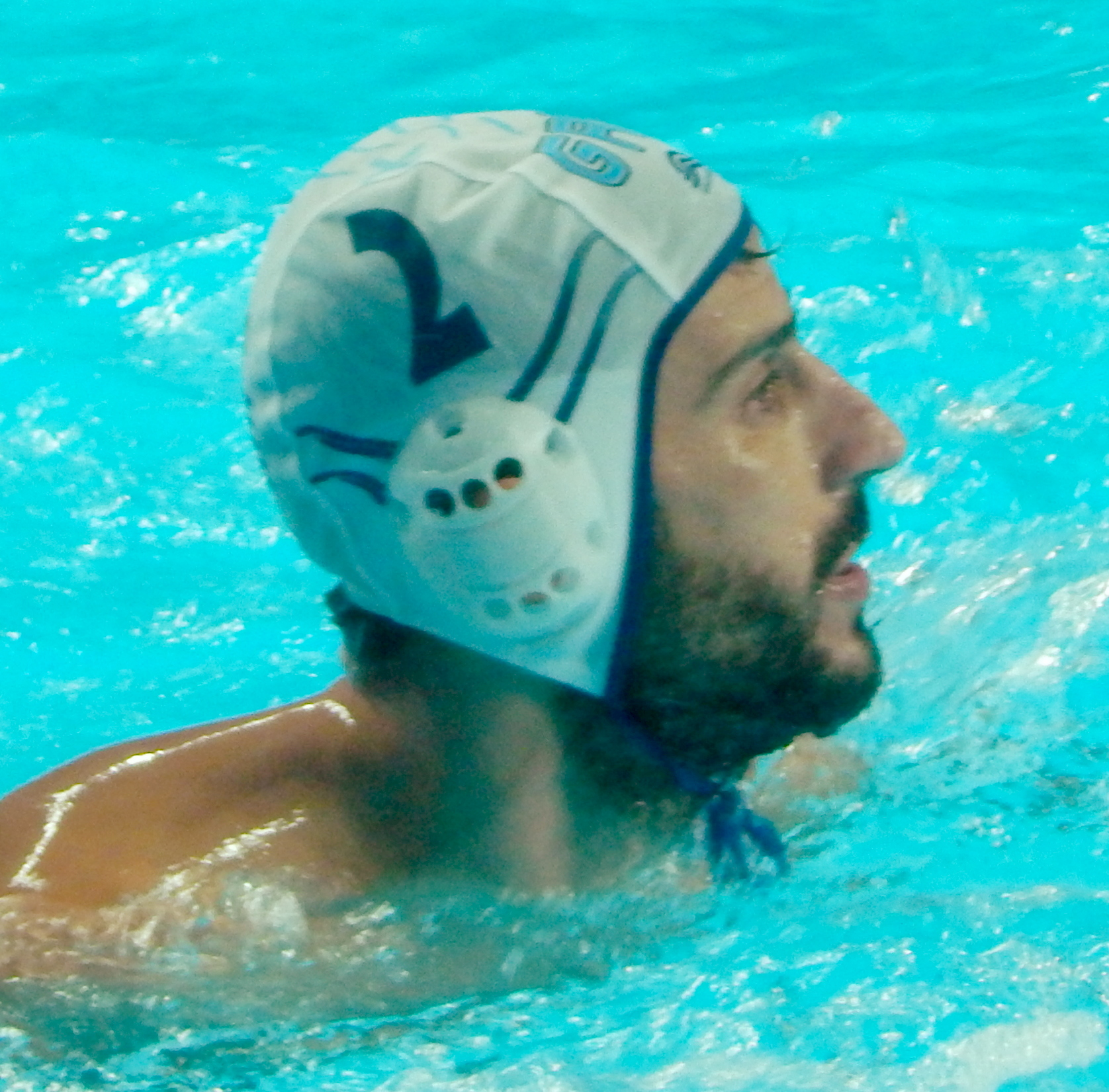
Manolis Mylonakis

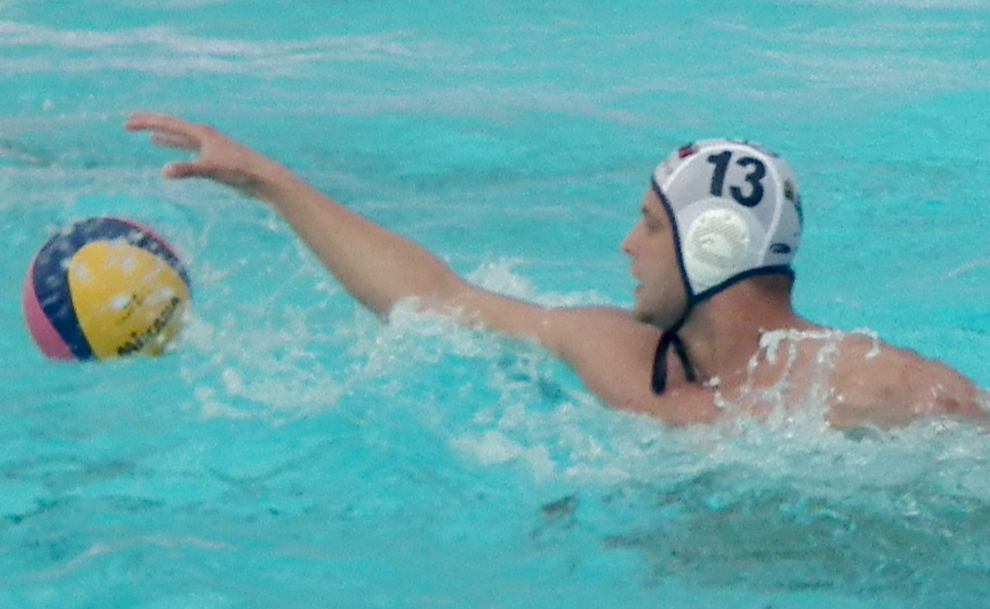
Luka Lončar voted the Best Center Forward in the World in 2017 and 2018.

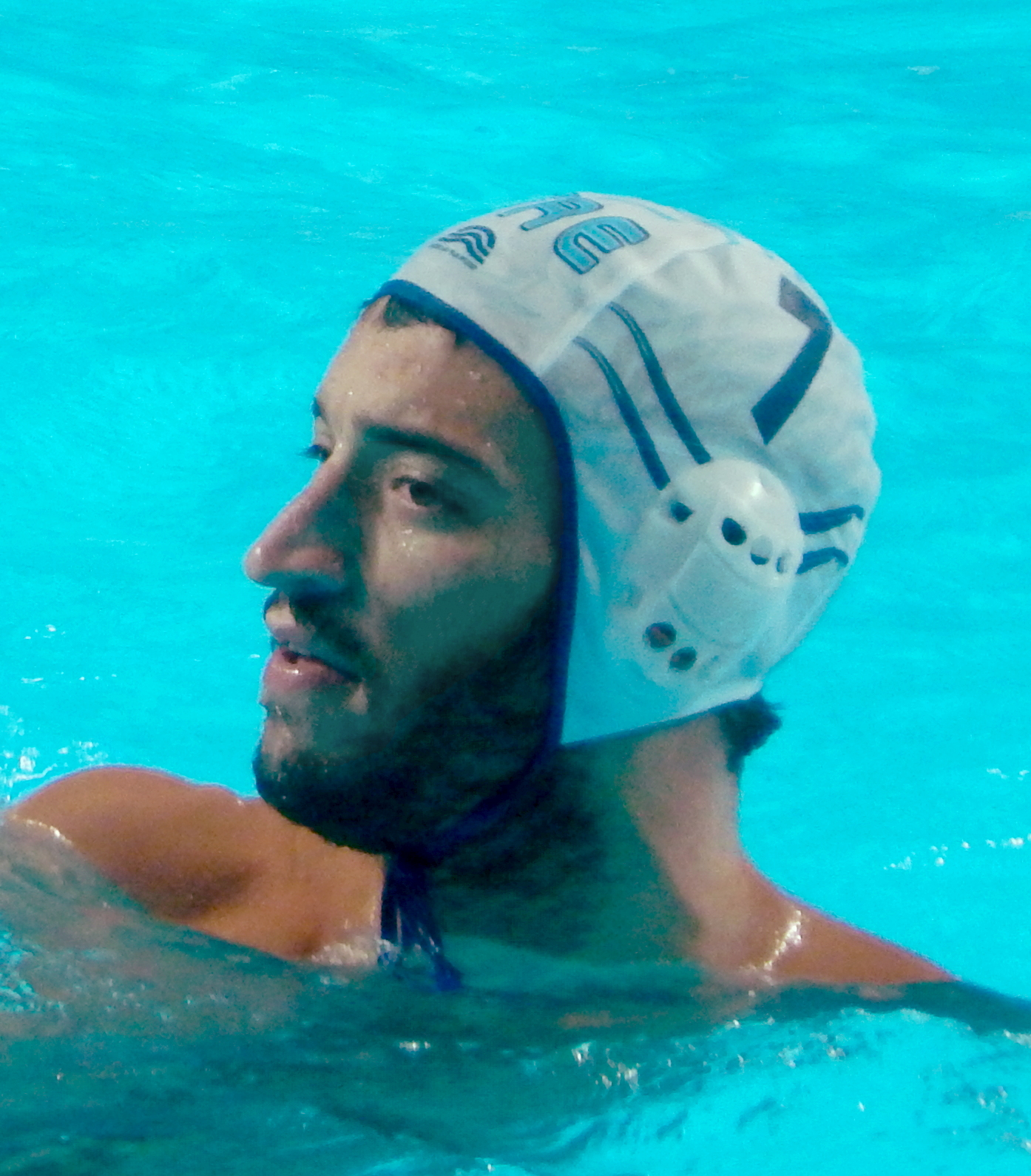
Christos Afroudakis

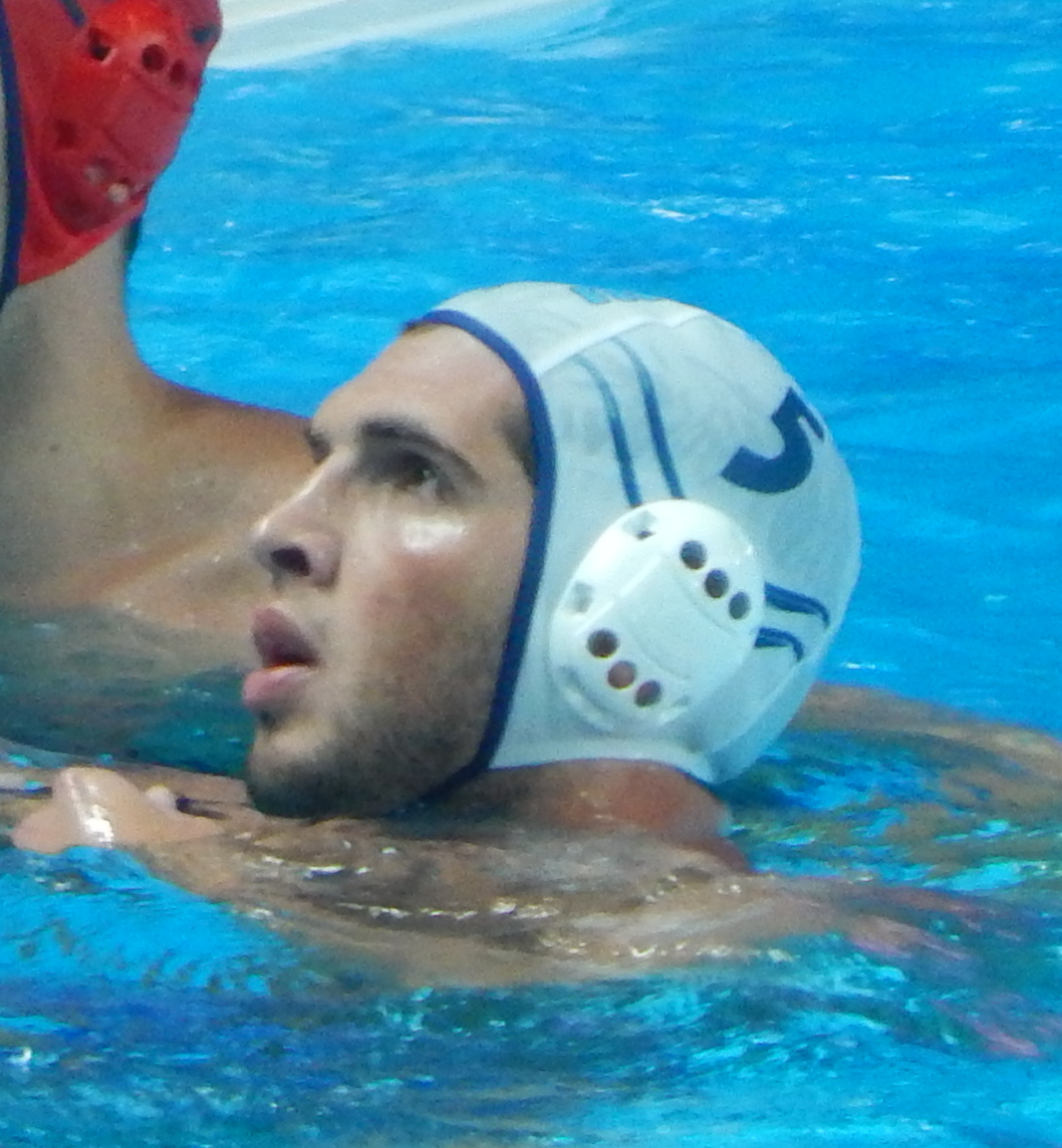
Giannis Fountoulis voted Second Best European Player in the World in 2016 and Third in 2018 and 2021

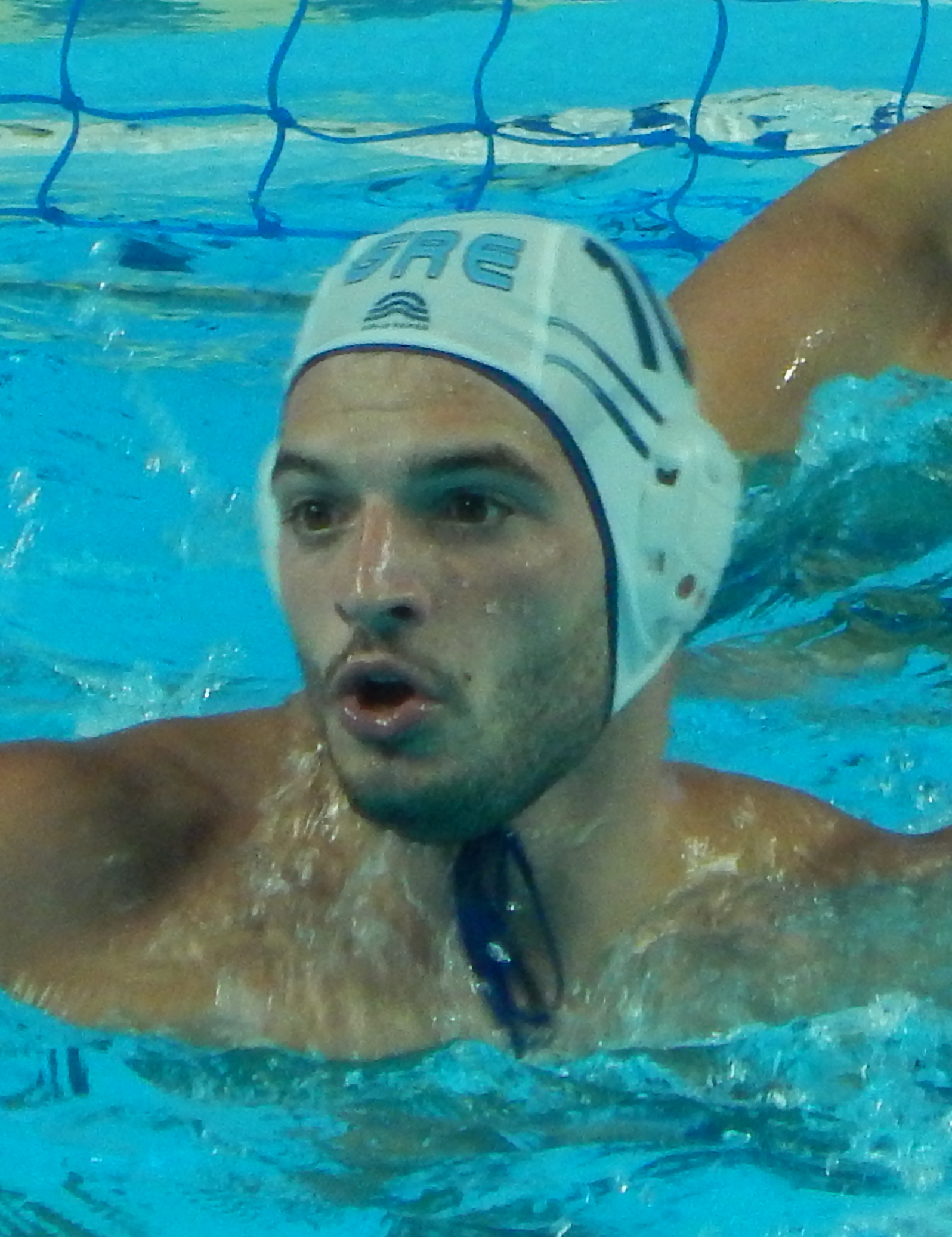
Christodoulos Kolomvos

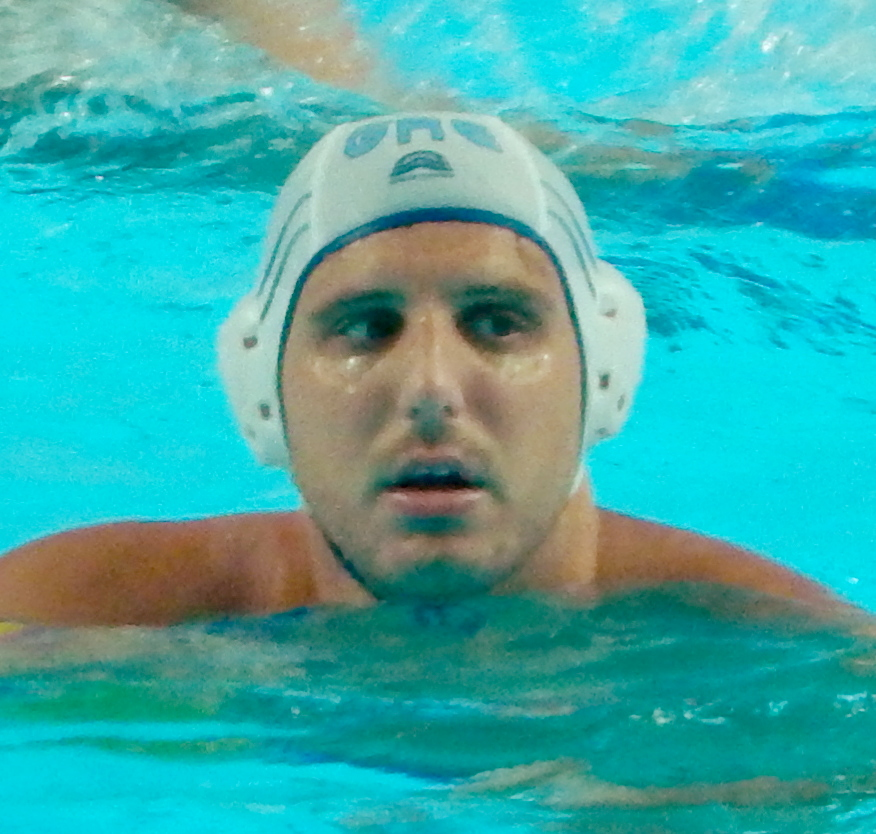
Konstantinos Mourikis

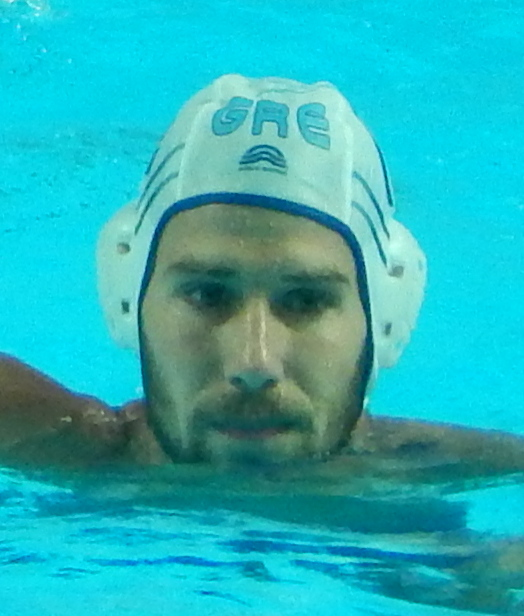
Angelos Vlachopoulos voted the Best Left Driver in the World in 2021.

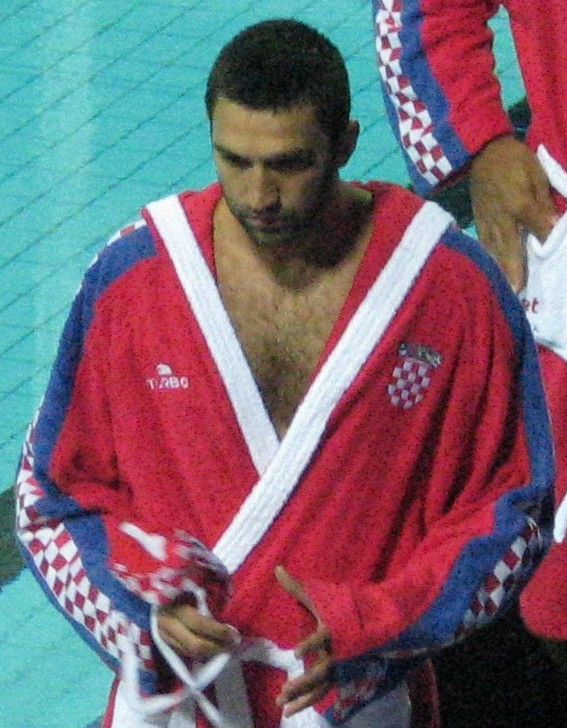
Josip Pavić, 2012 FINA World Player of the Year

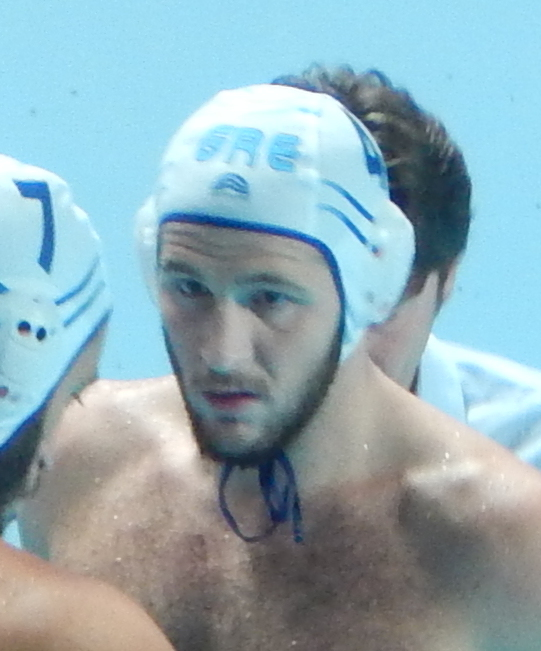
Konstantinos Genidounias

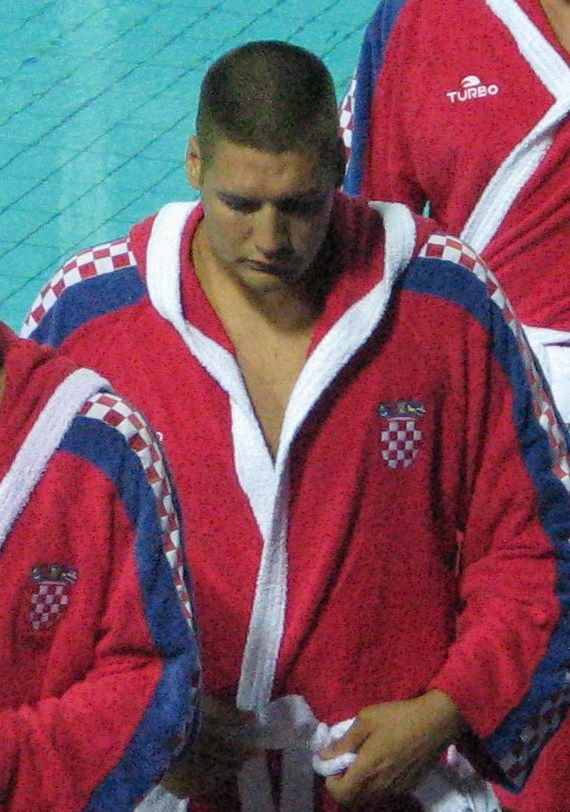
Andro Bušlje voted the Best Defender in the World in 2017.

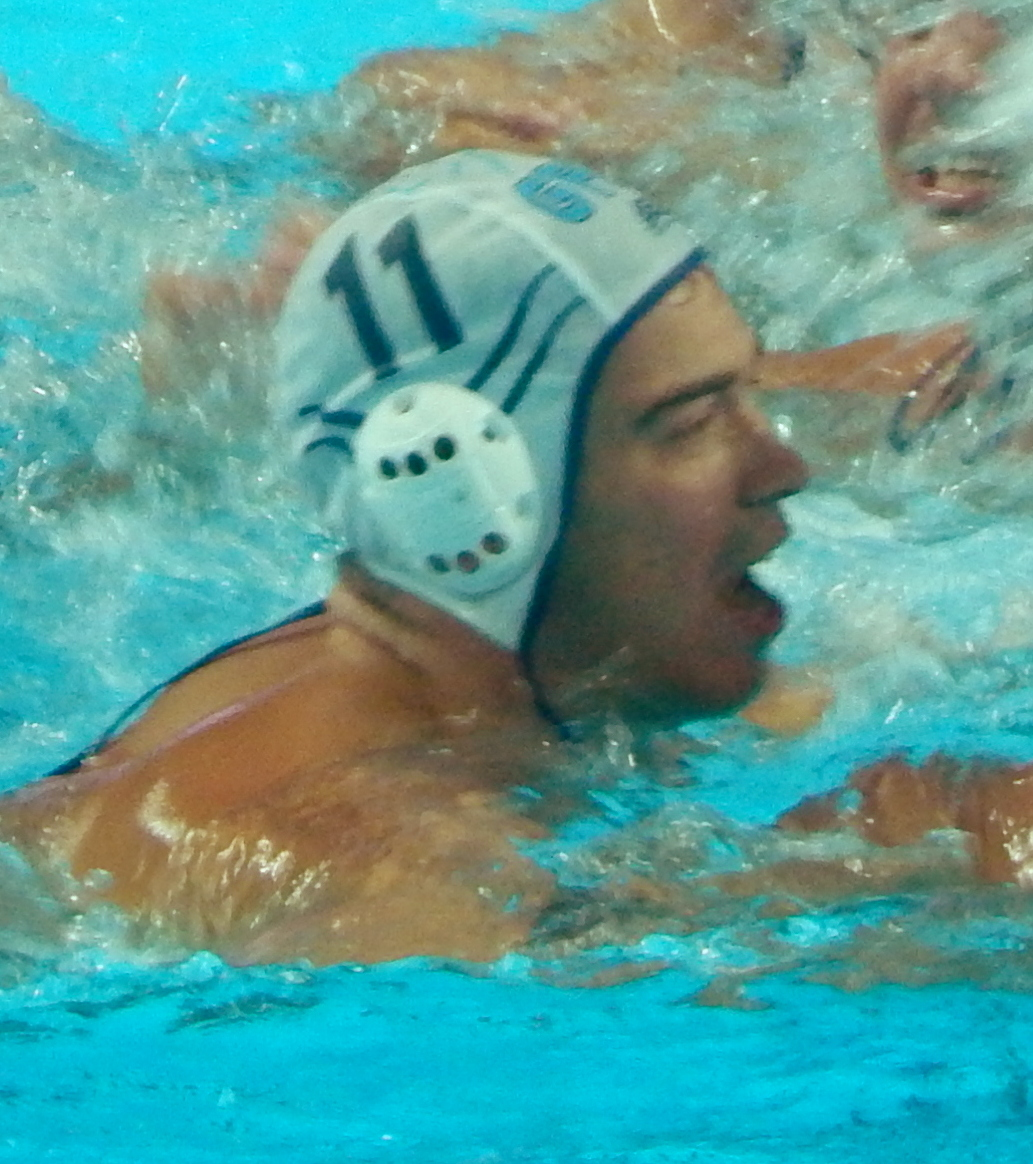
Alexandros Gounas

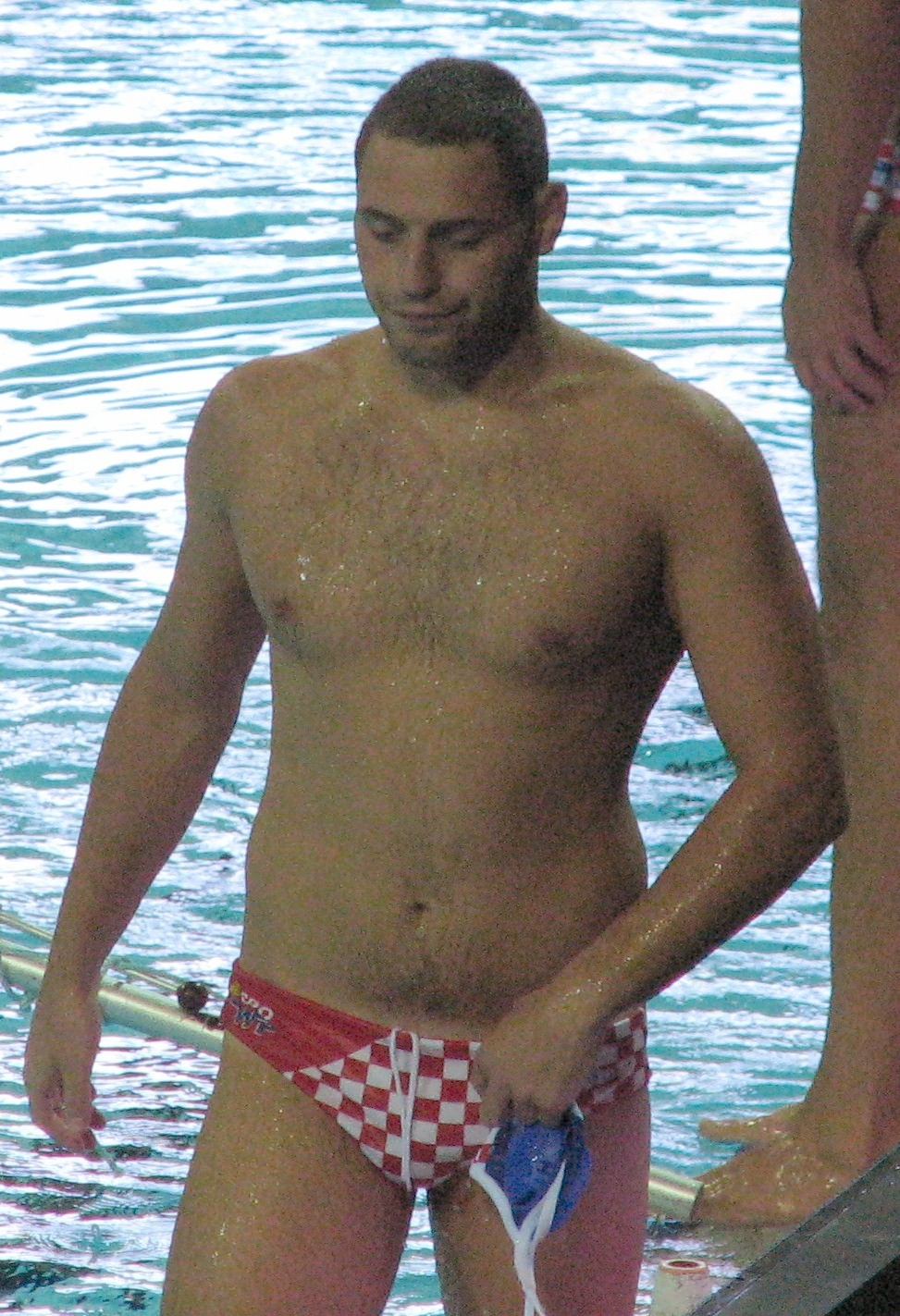
Paulo Obradović

=== Handball (men's) ===
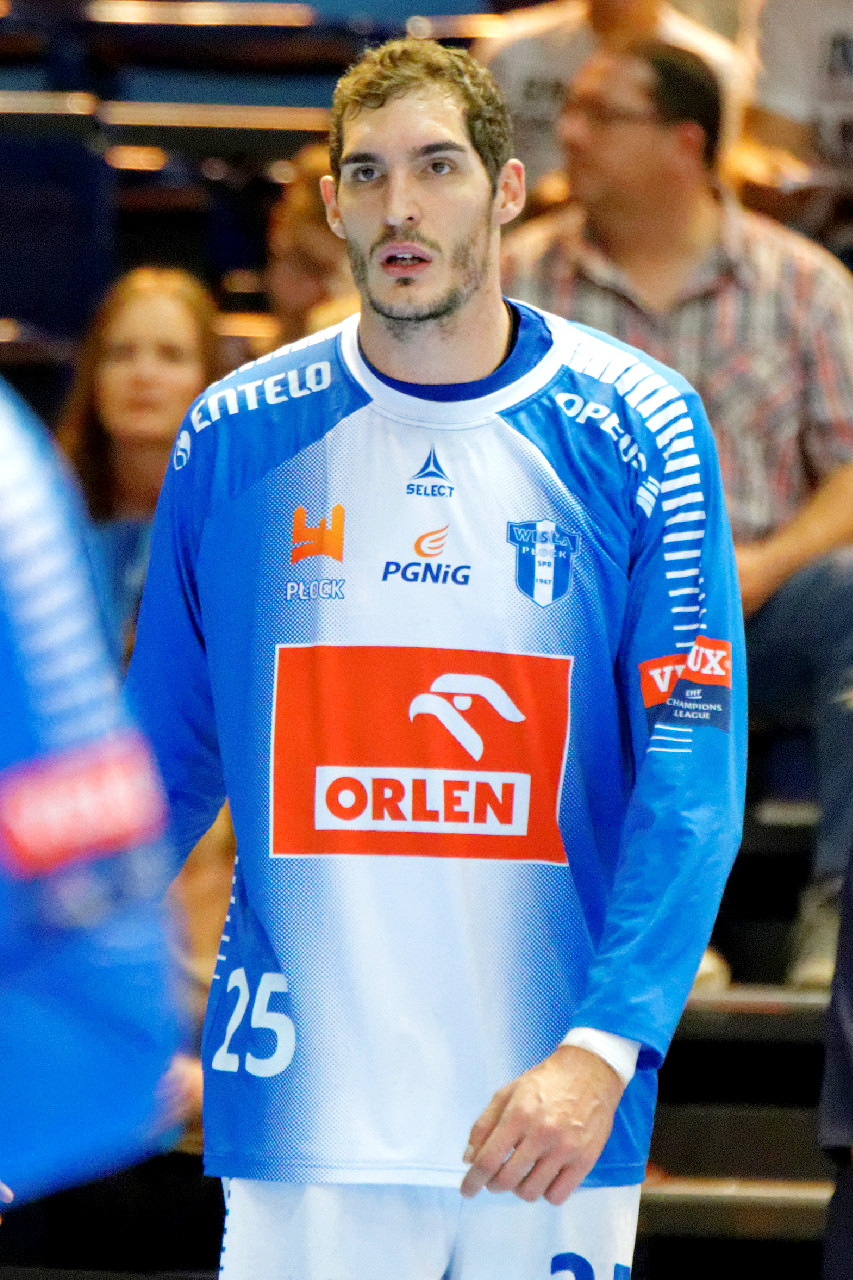
Ángel Montoro

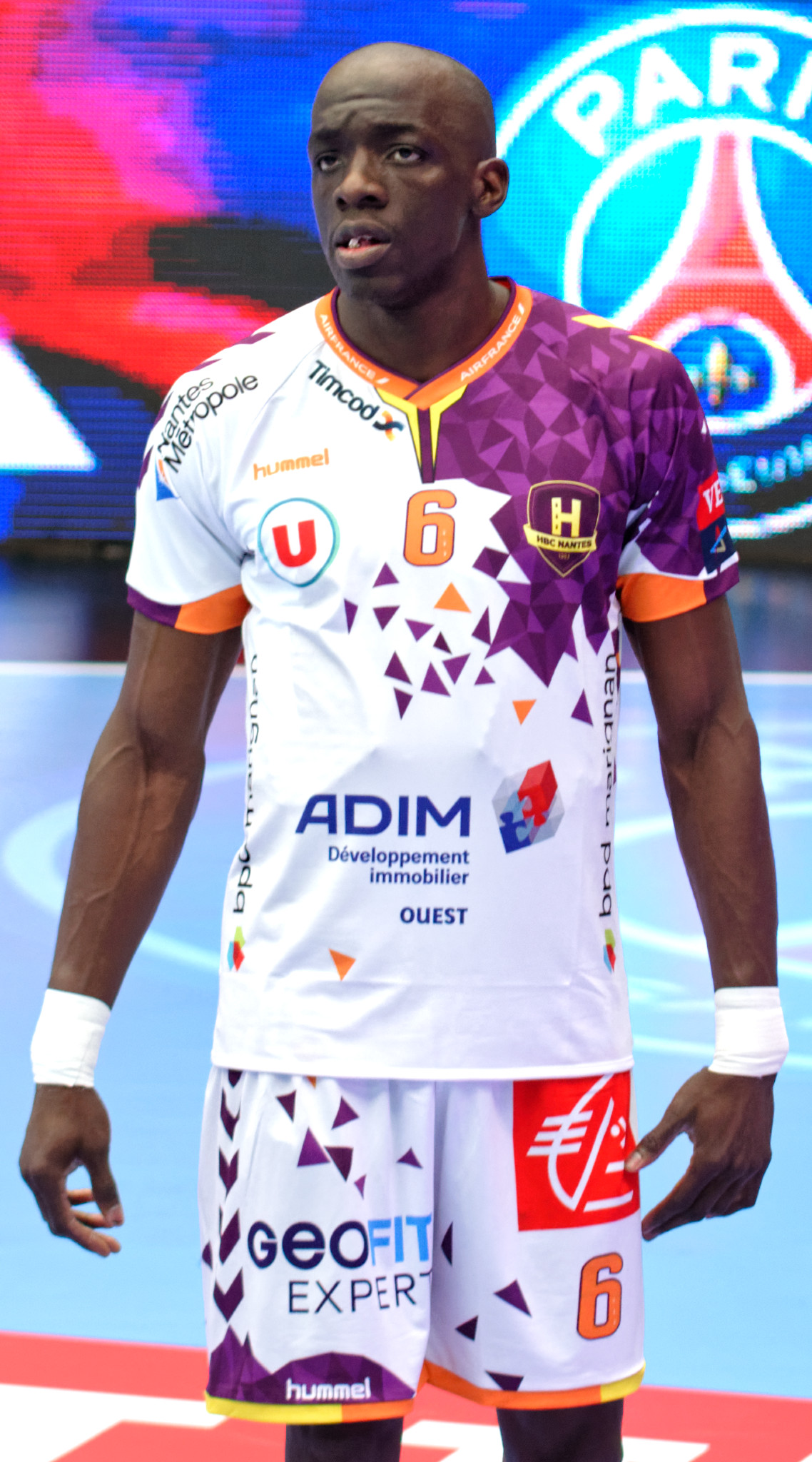
Olivier Nyokas

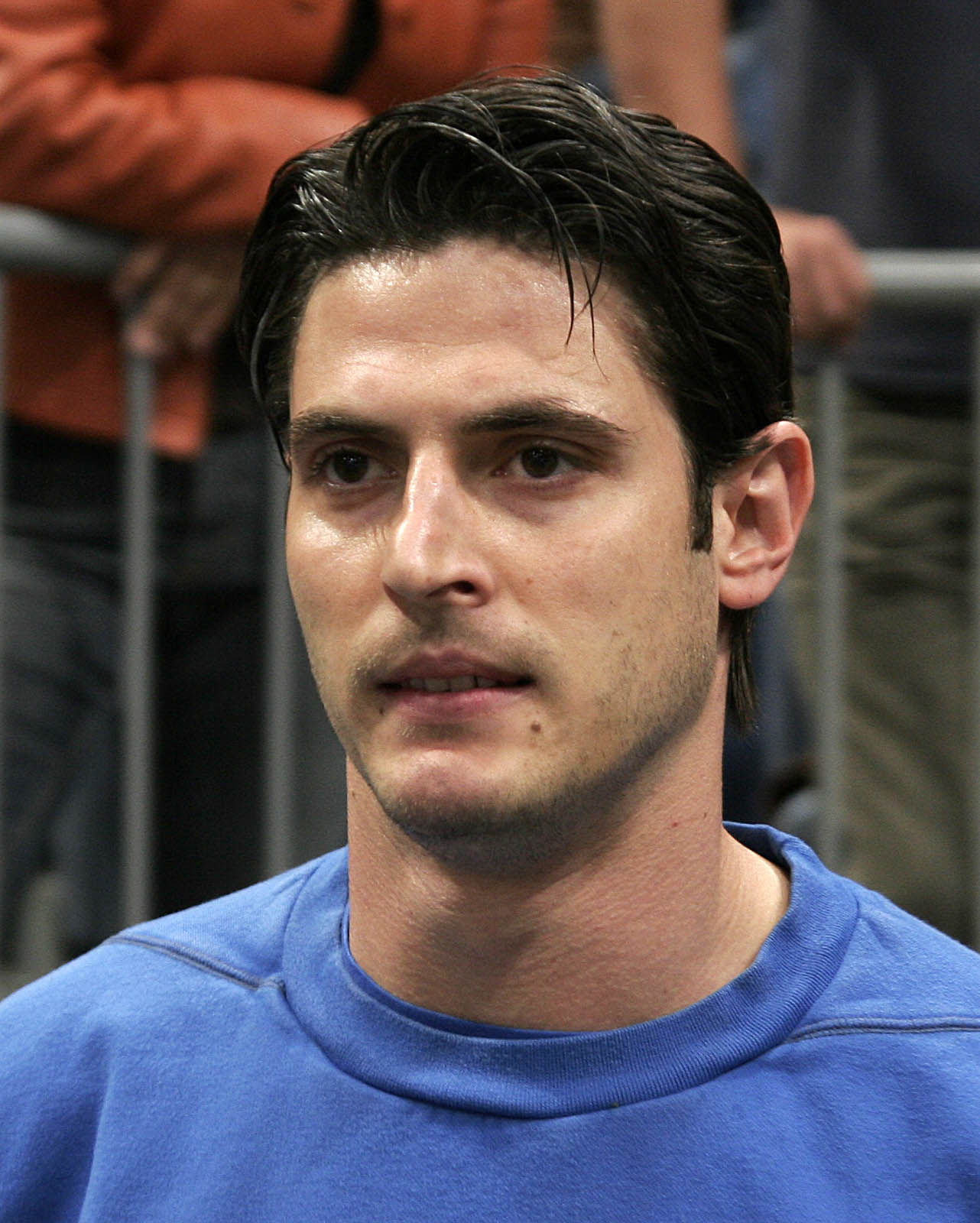
Alexandros Alvanos

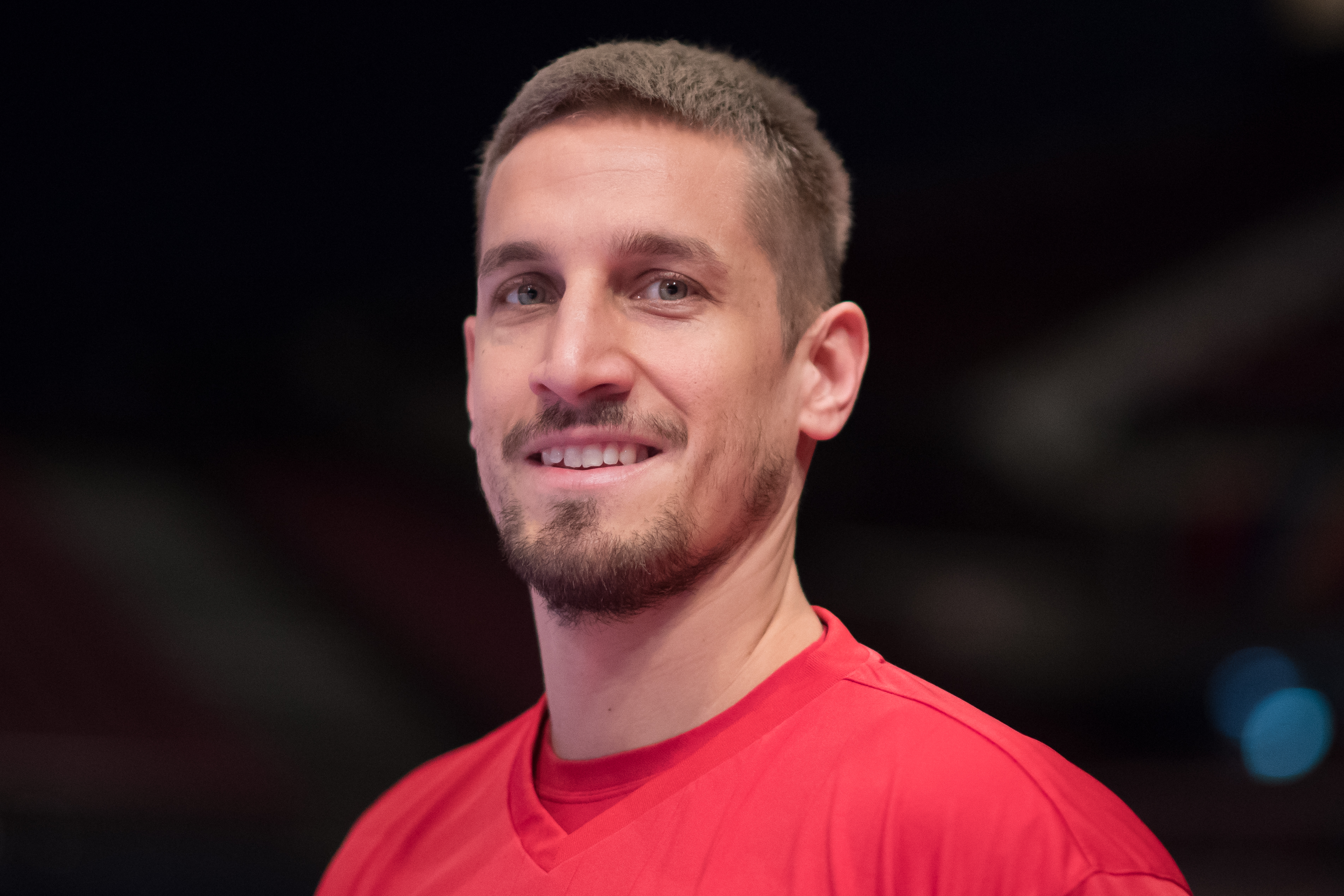
Thomas Bauer

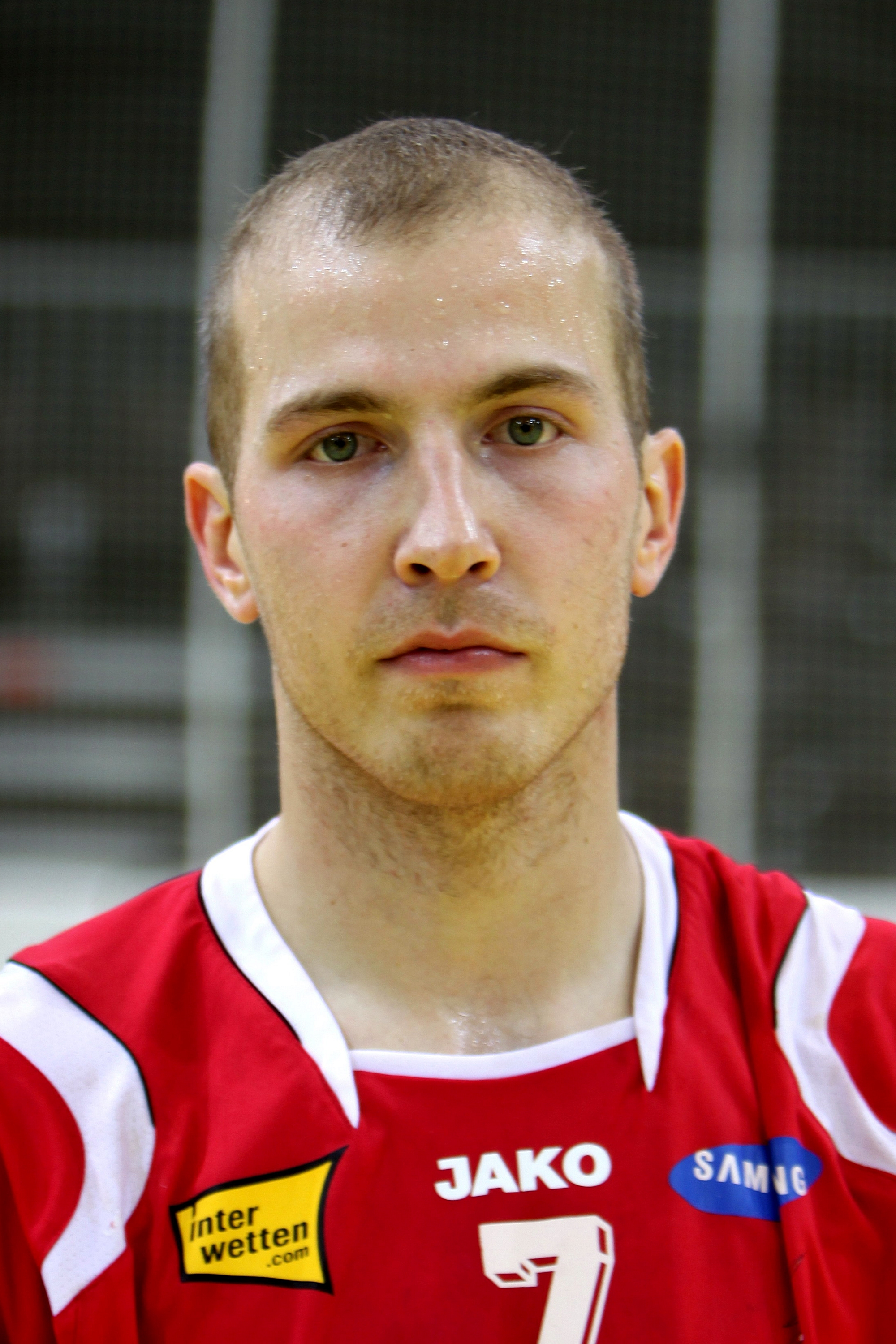
Rober Weber

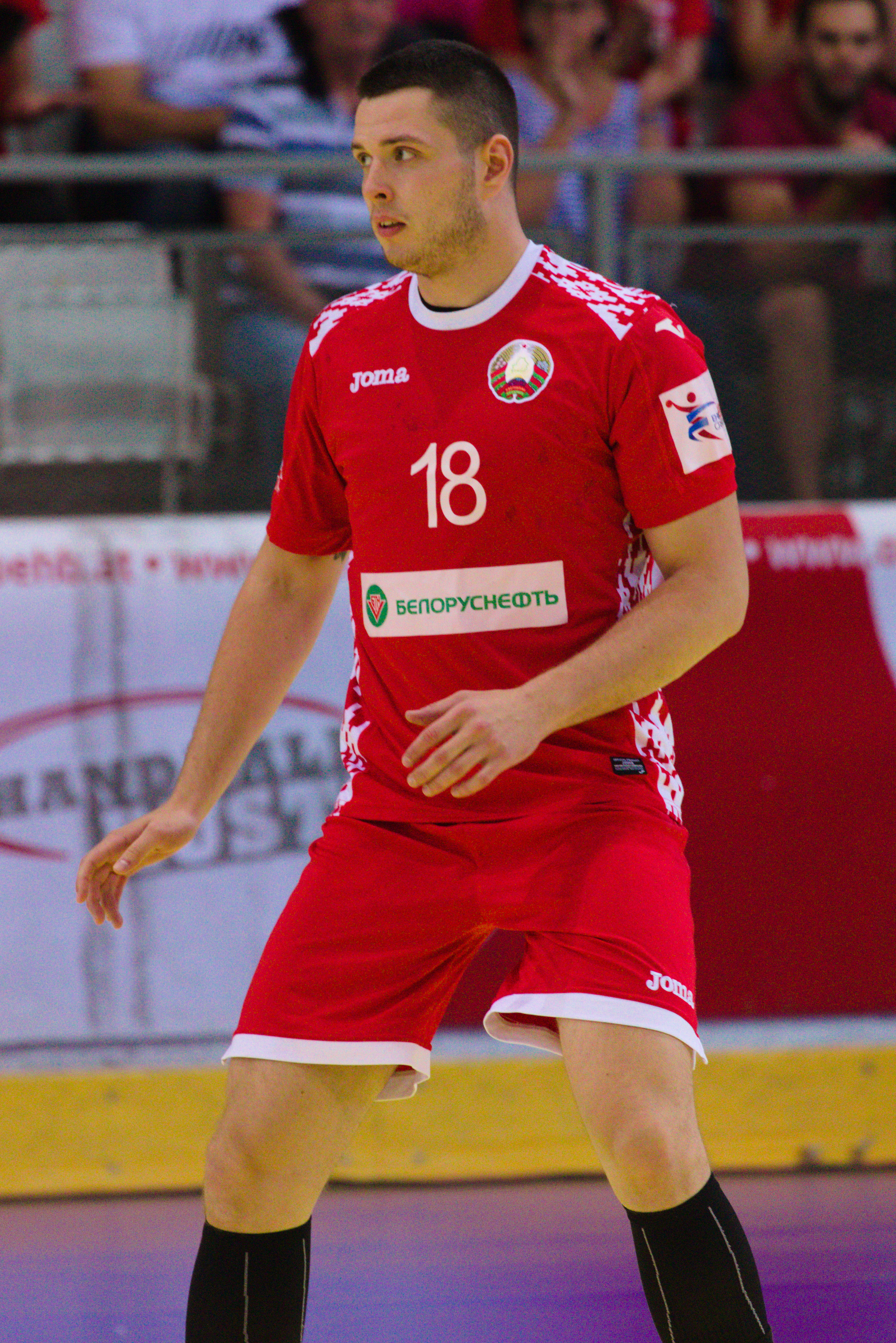
Artur Karvatski

=== Water Polo (women's) ===
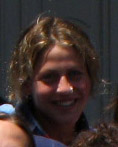
Patricia del Soto

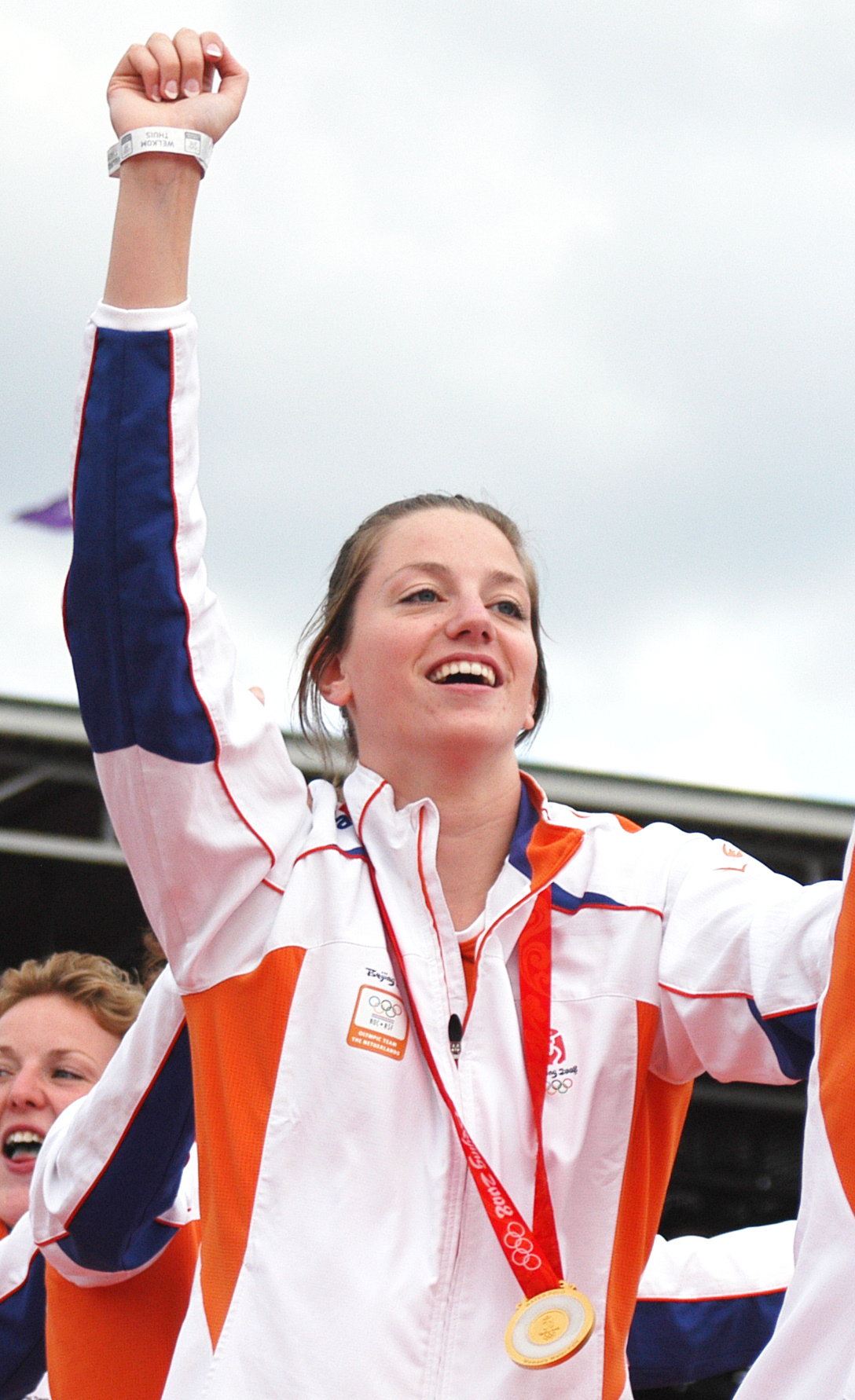
Iefke van Belkum

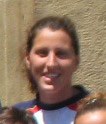
Blanca Gil

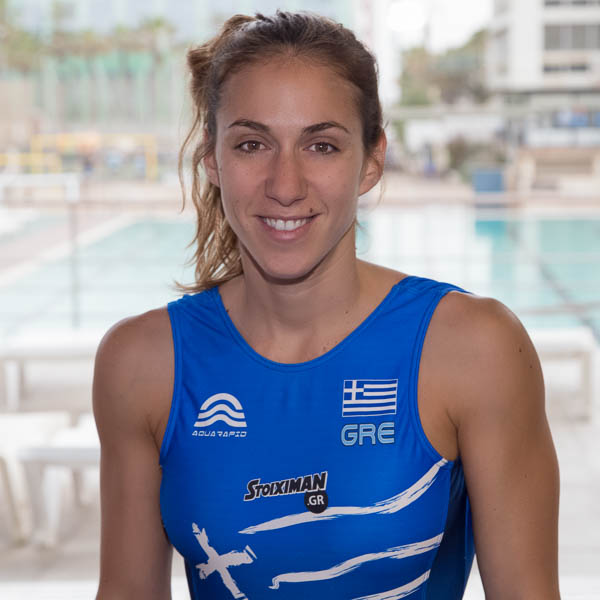
Alkisti Avramidou

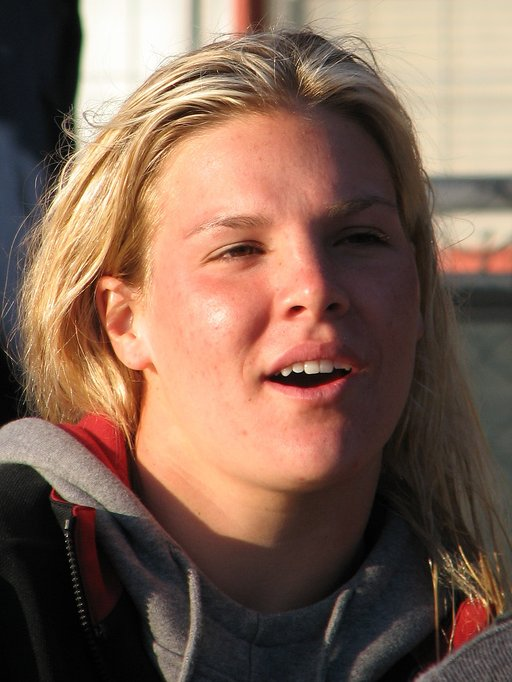
Kami Craig

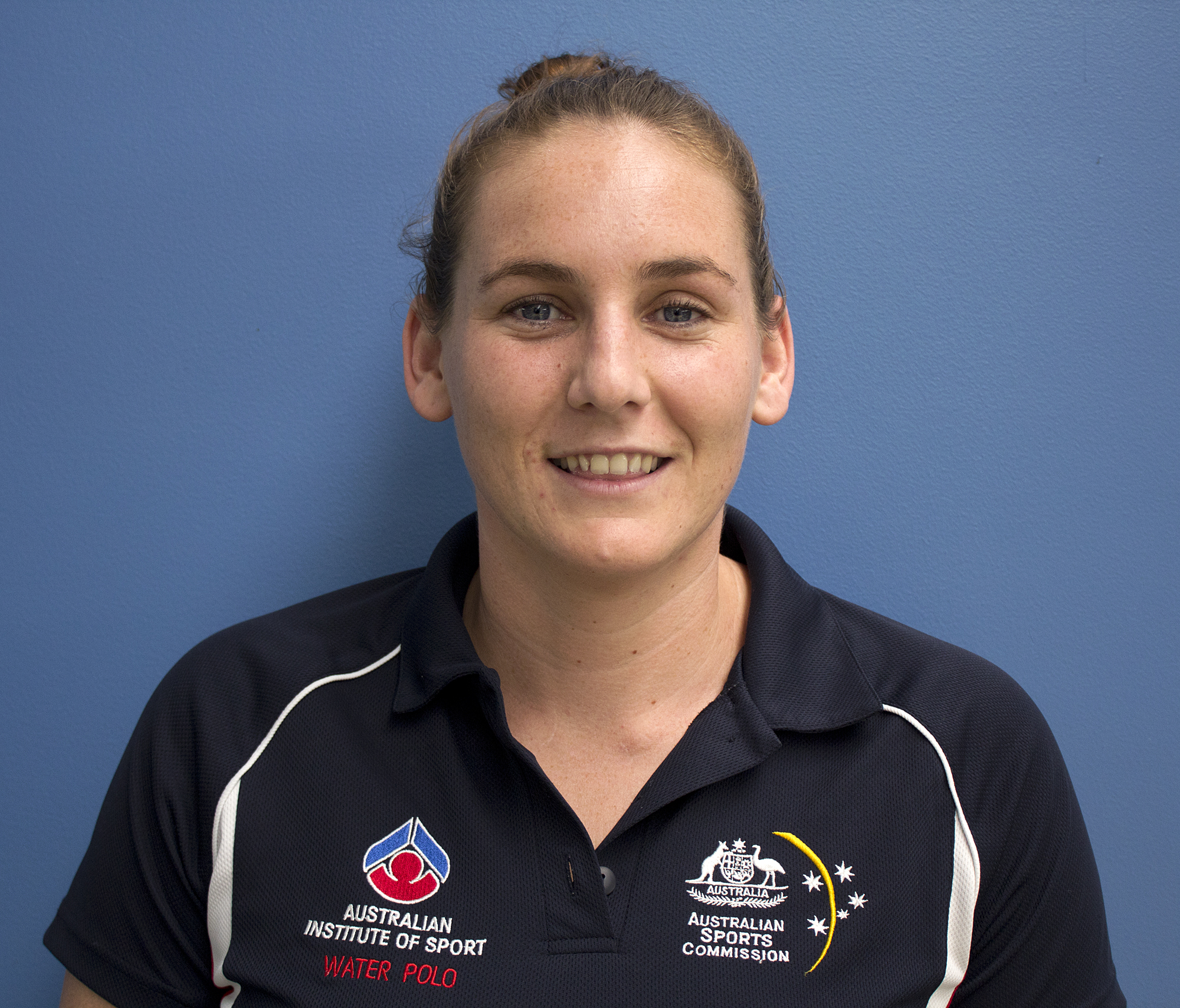
Bronwen Knox

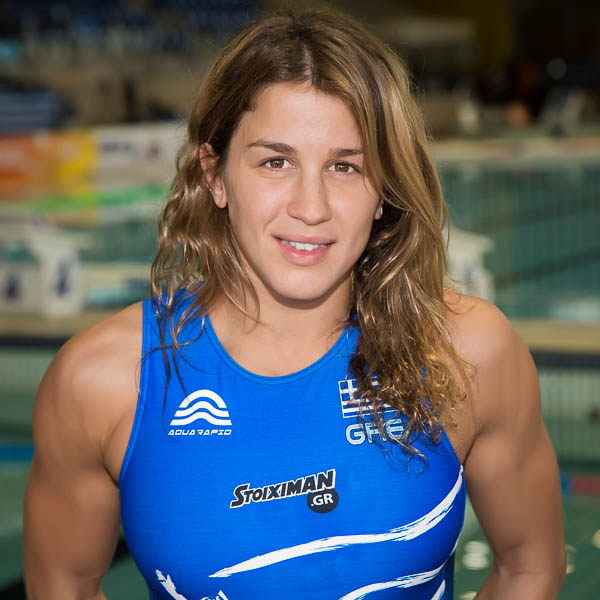
Alexandra Asimaki

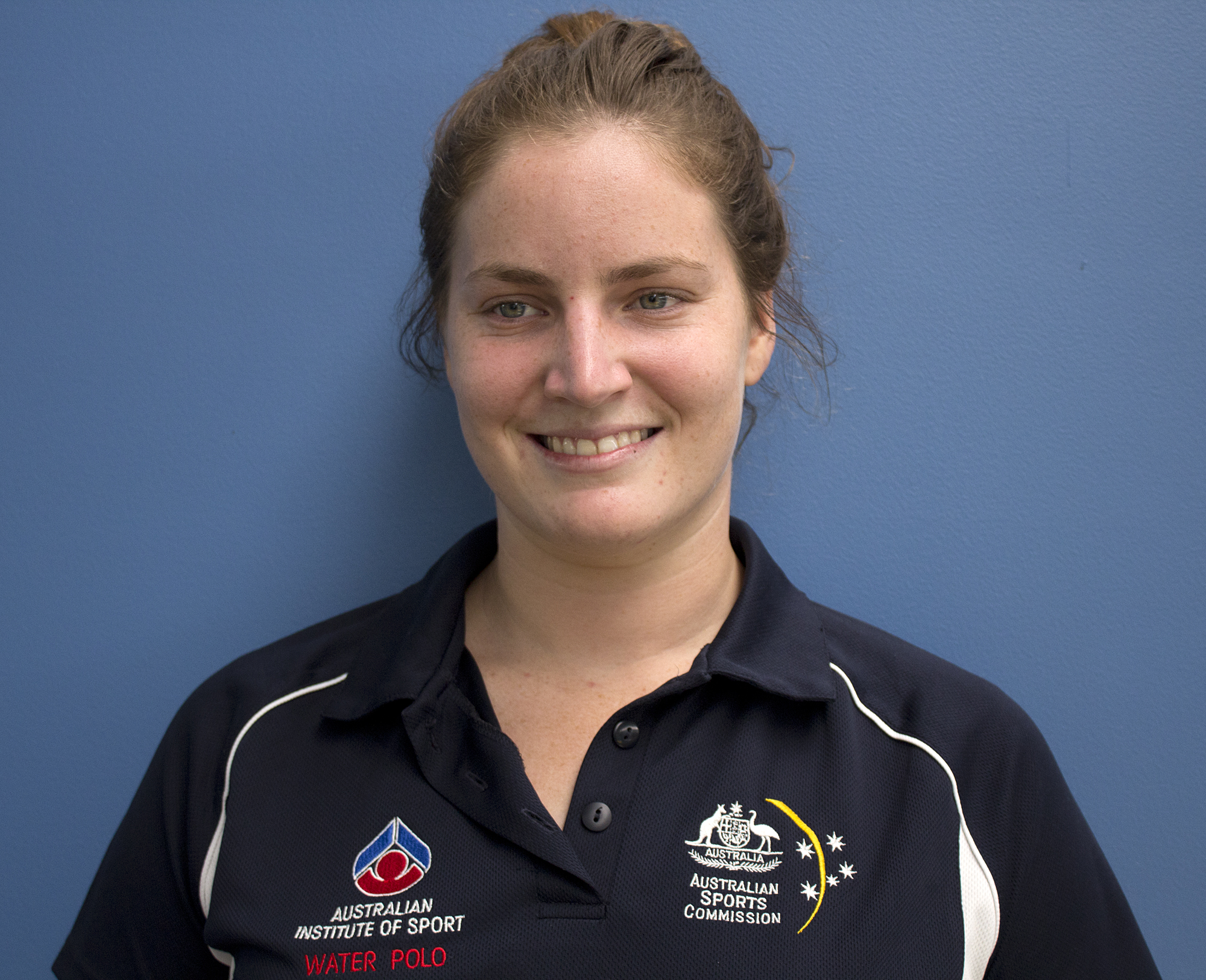
Ashleigh Southern

=== Volleyball (women's) ===
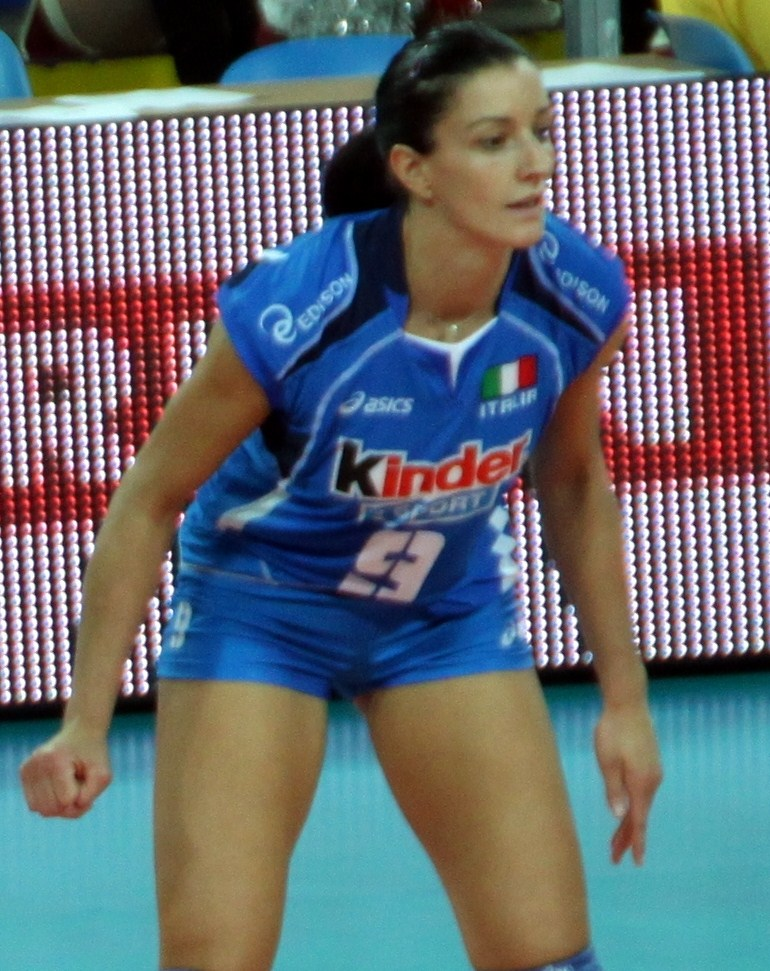
Manuela Secolo

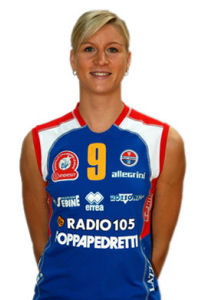
Riikka Lehtonen

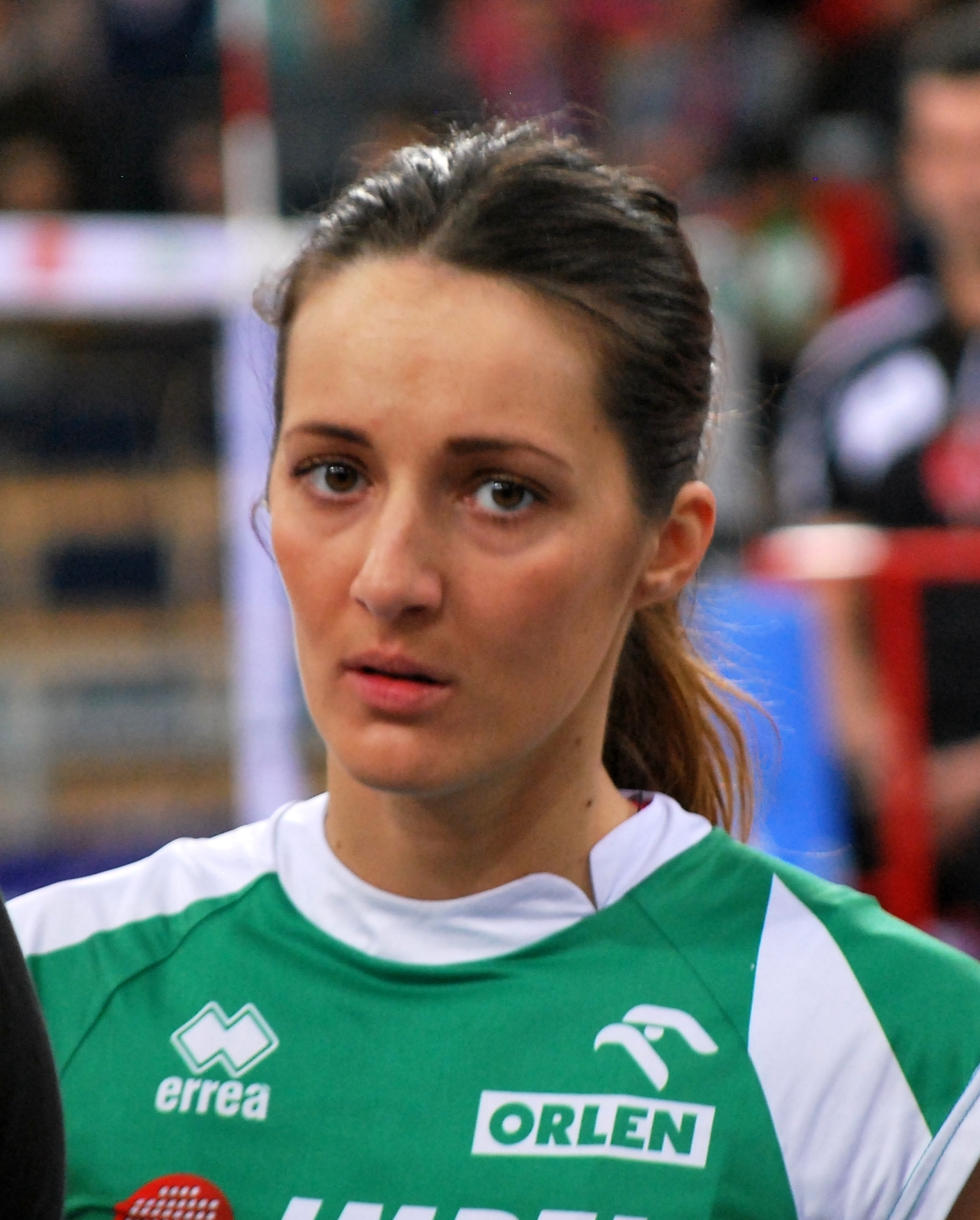
Maja Ognjenović

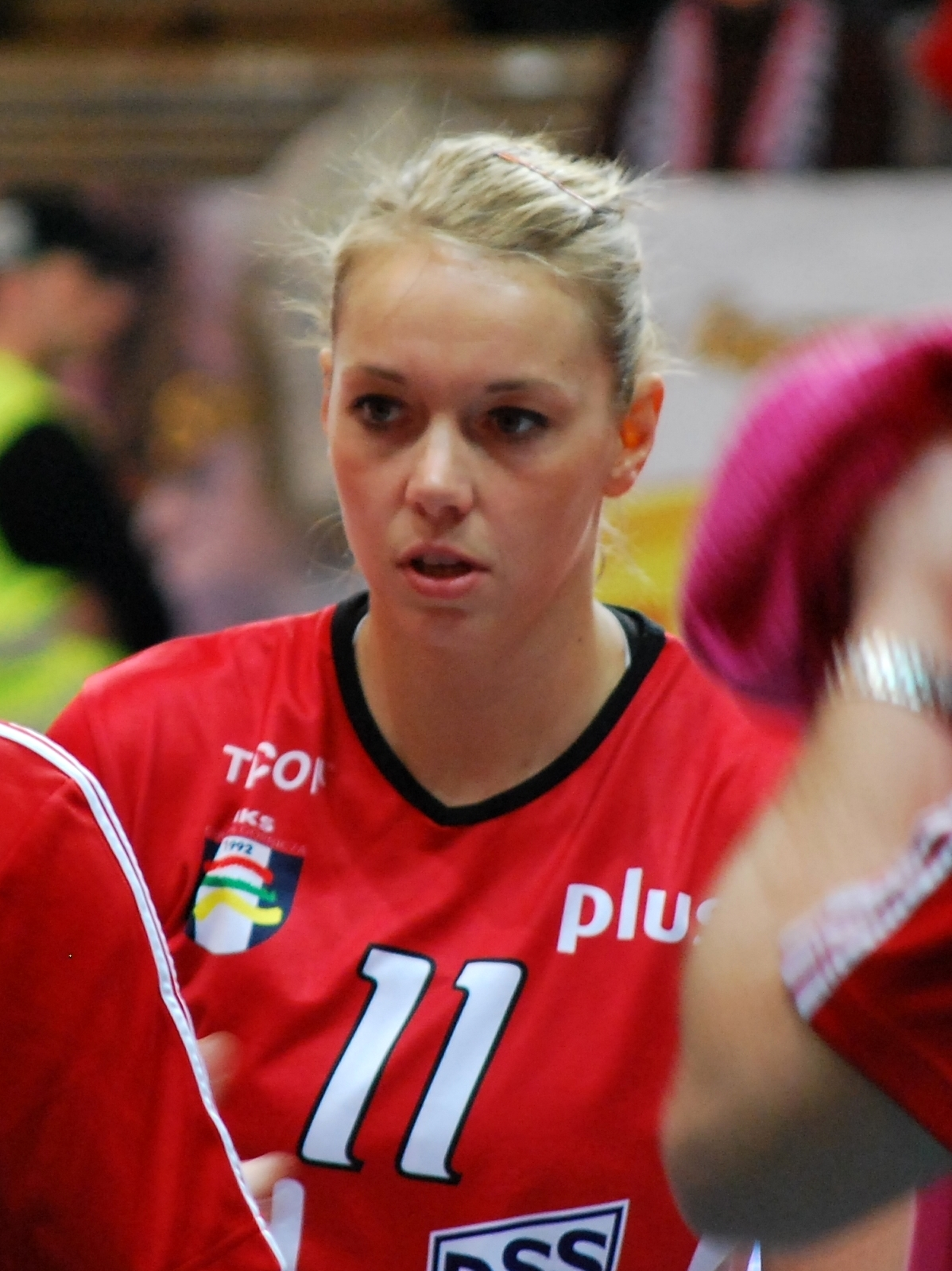
Lucie Mühlsteinová

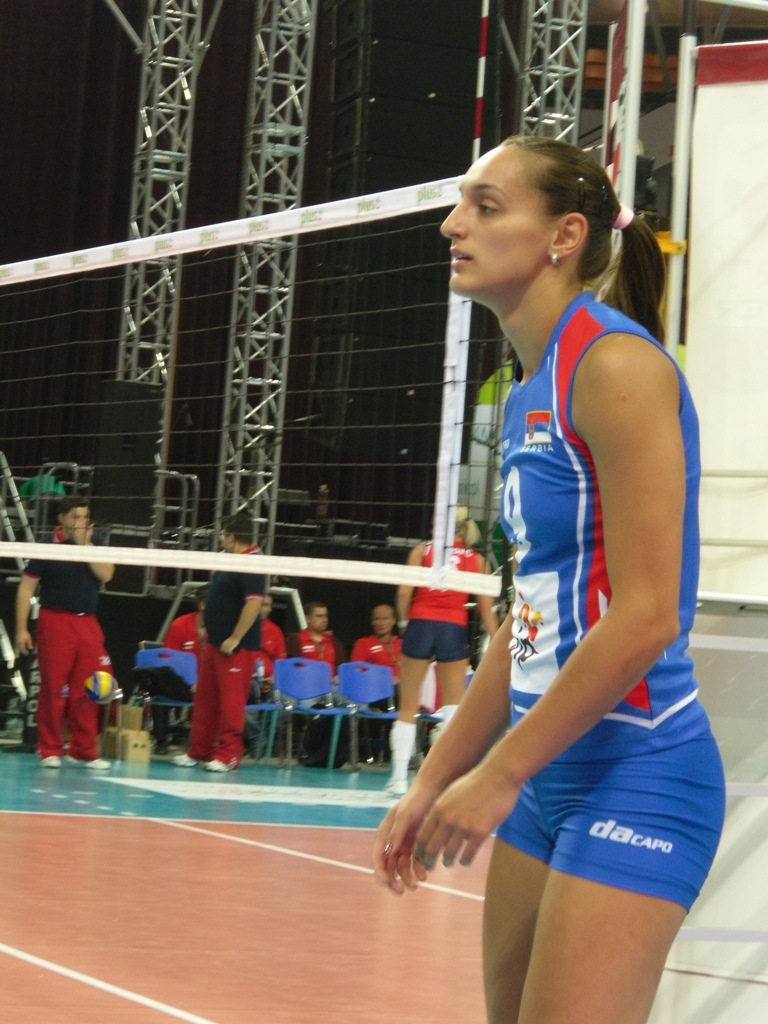
Jovana Vesović

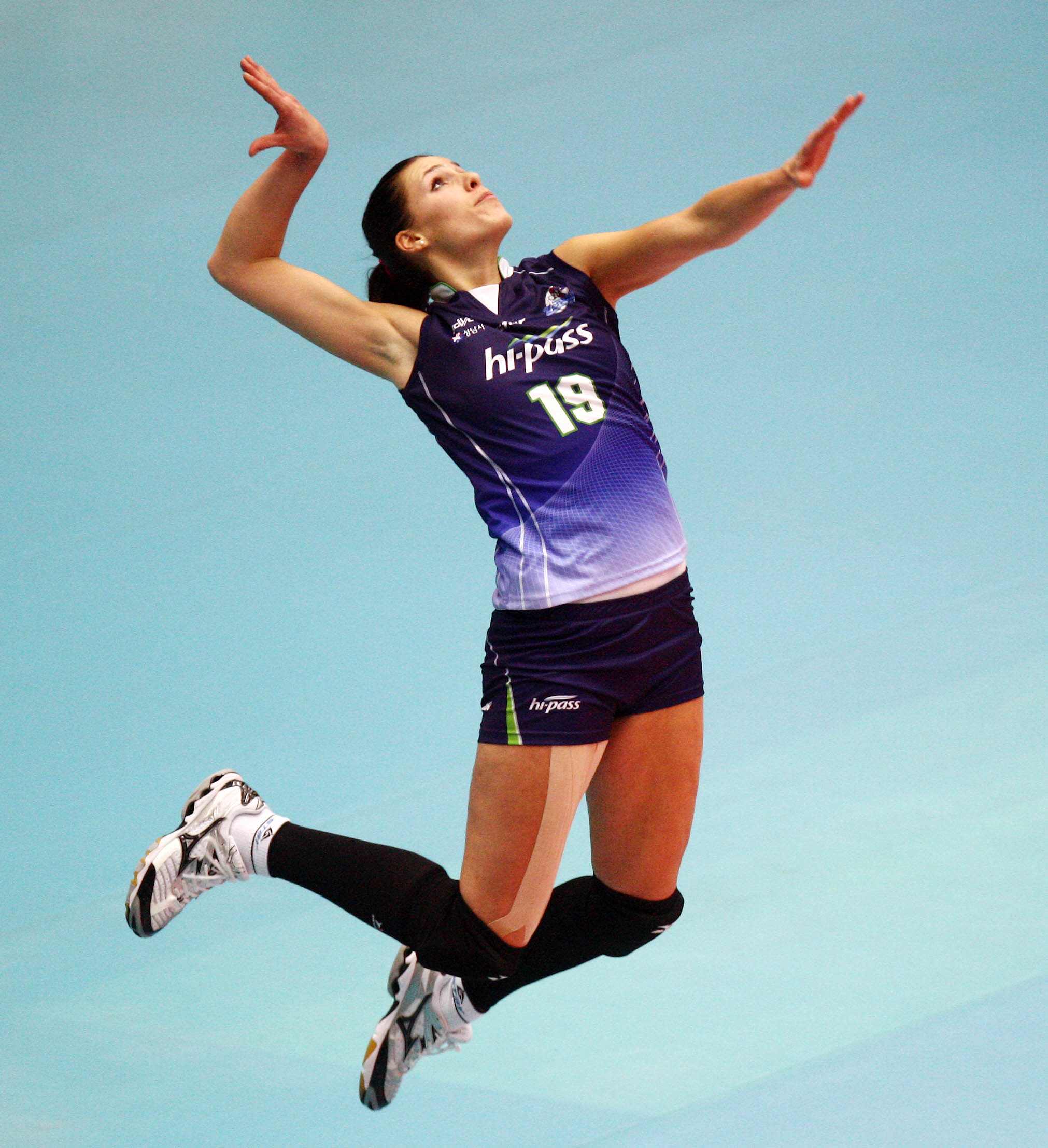
Ivana Nešović

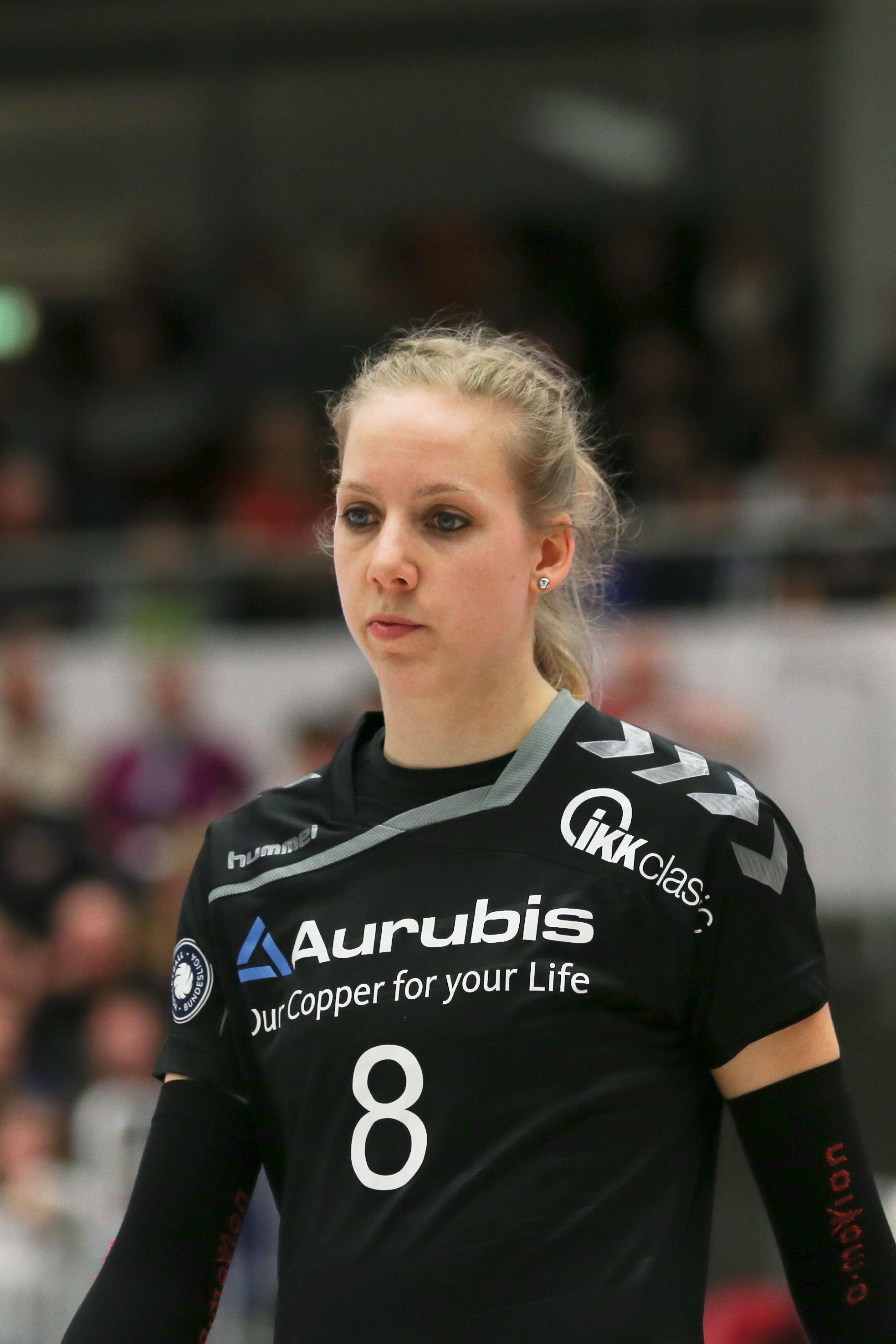
Jana Franziska Poll

=== Basketball (women's) ===
Evanthia Maltsi

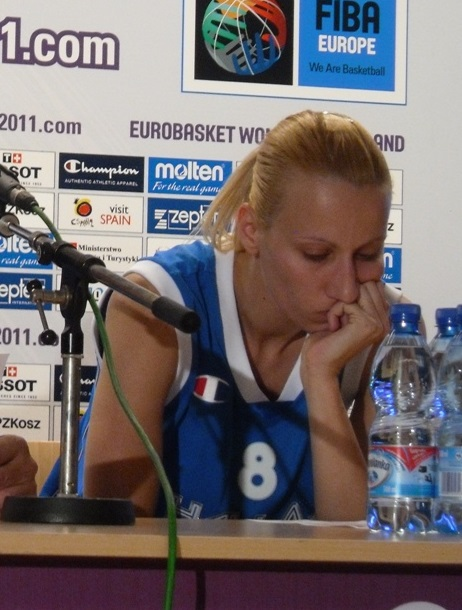
Styliani Kaltsidou

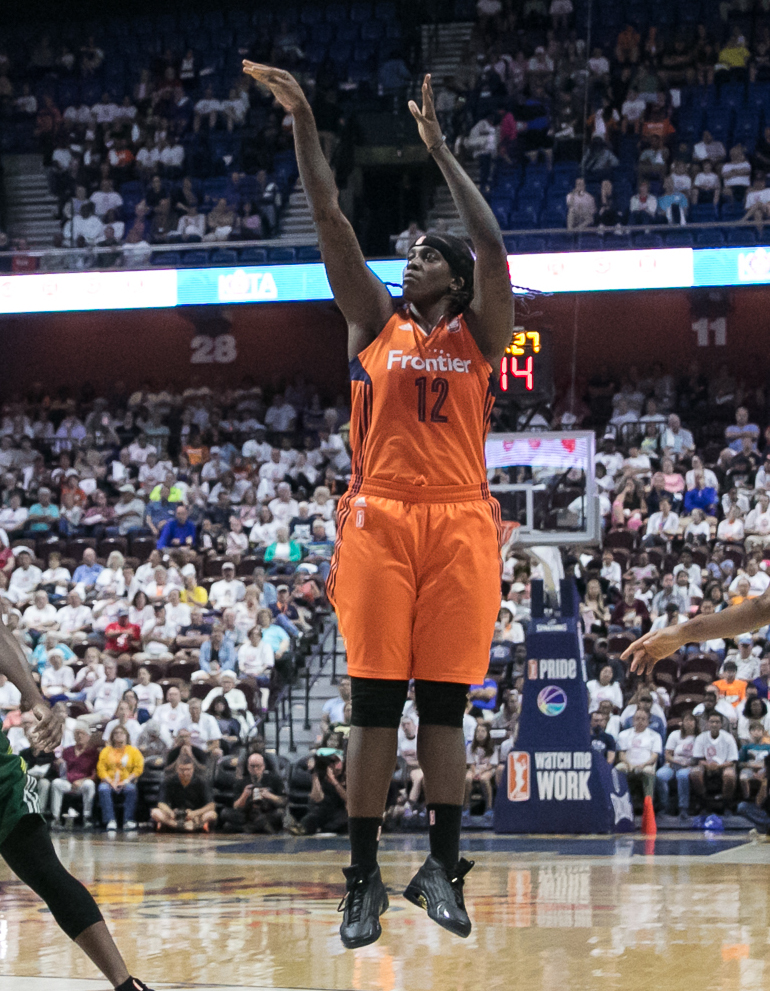
Lynetta Kizer

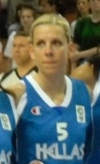
Evdokia Stamati

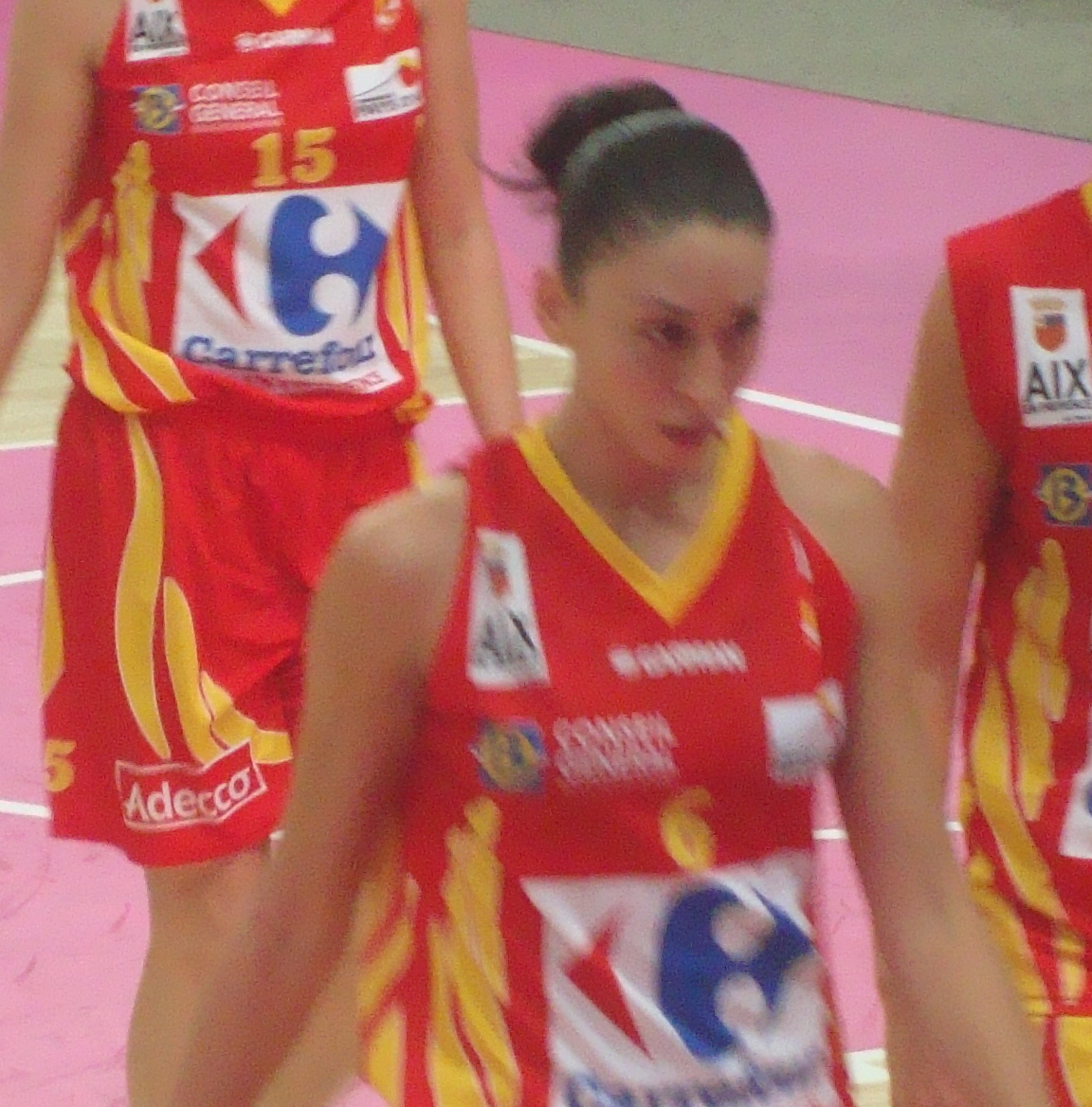
Zoi Dimitrakou

Pelagia Papamichail

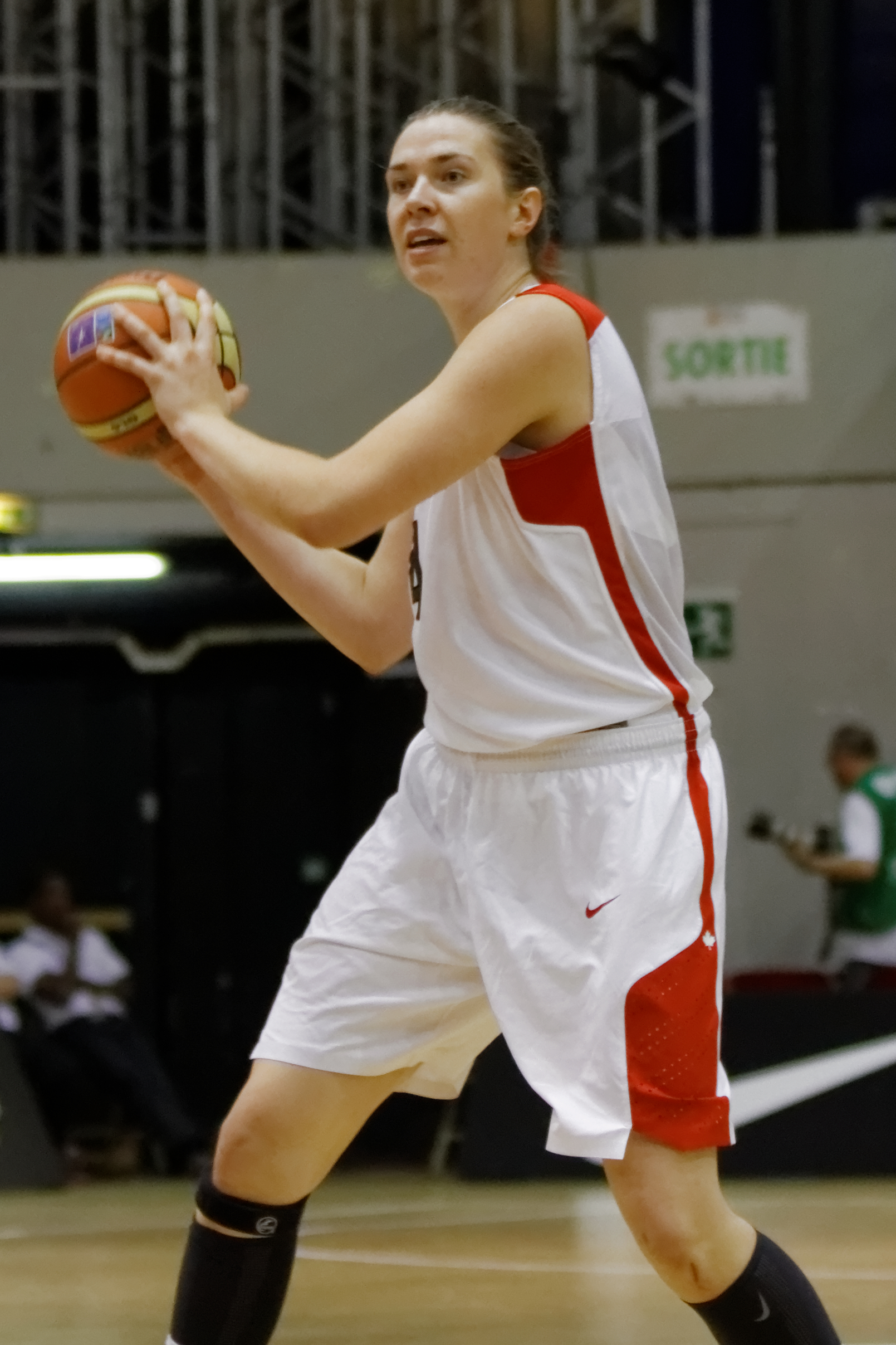
Ruth Hamblin

=== Racing (Superleague Formula) ===
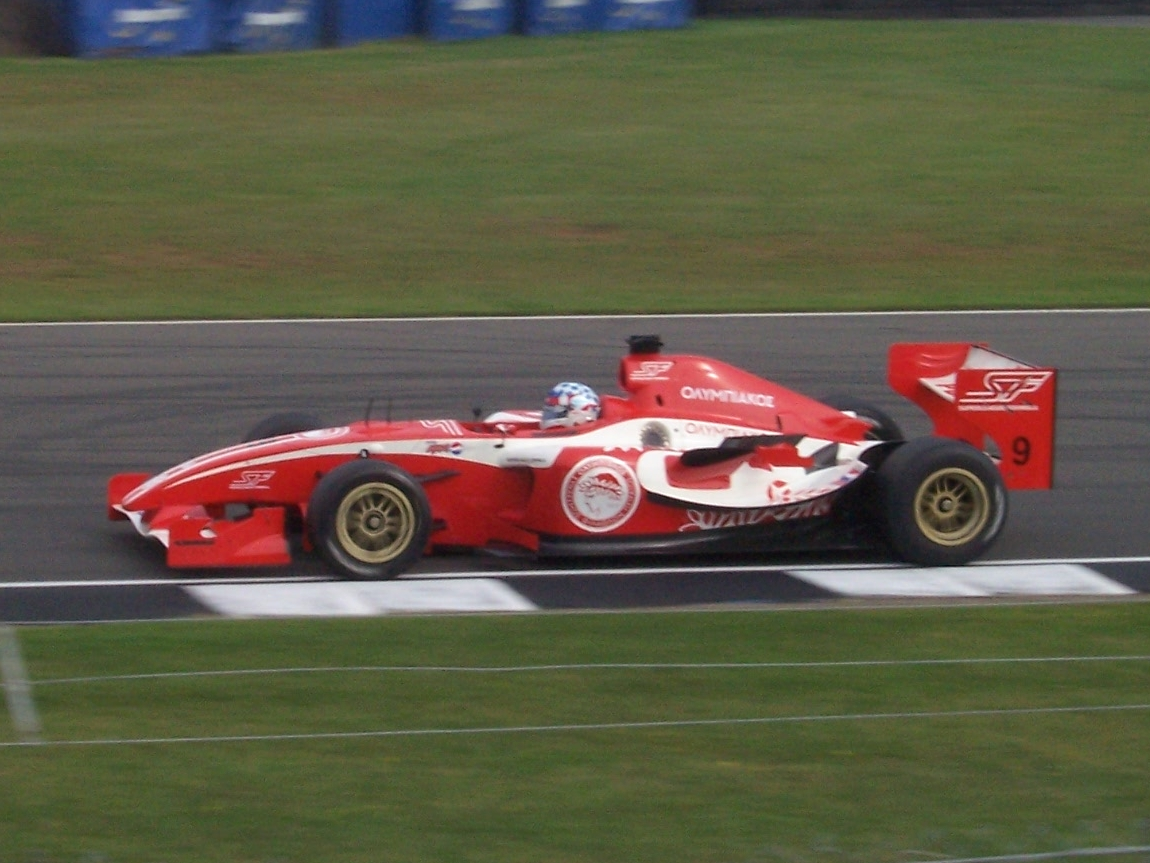
Kasper Andersen in the Olympiacos Formula car

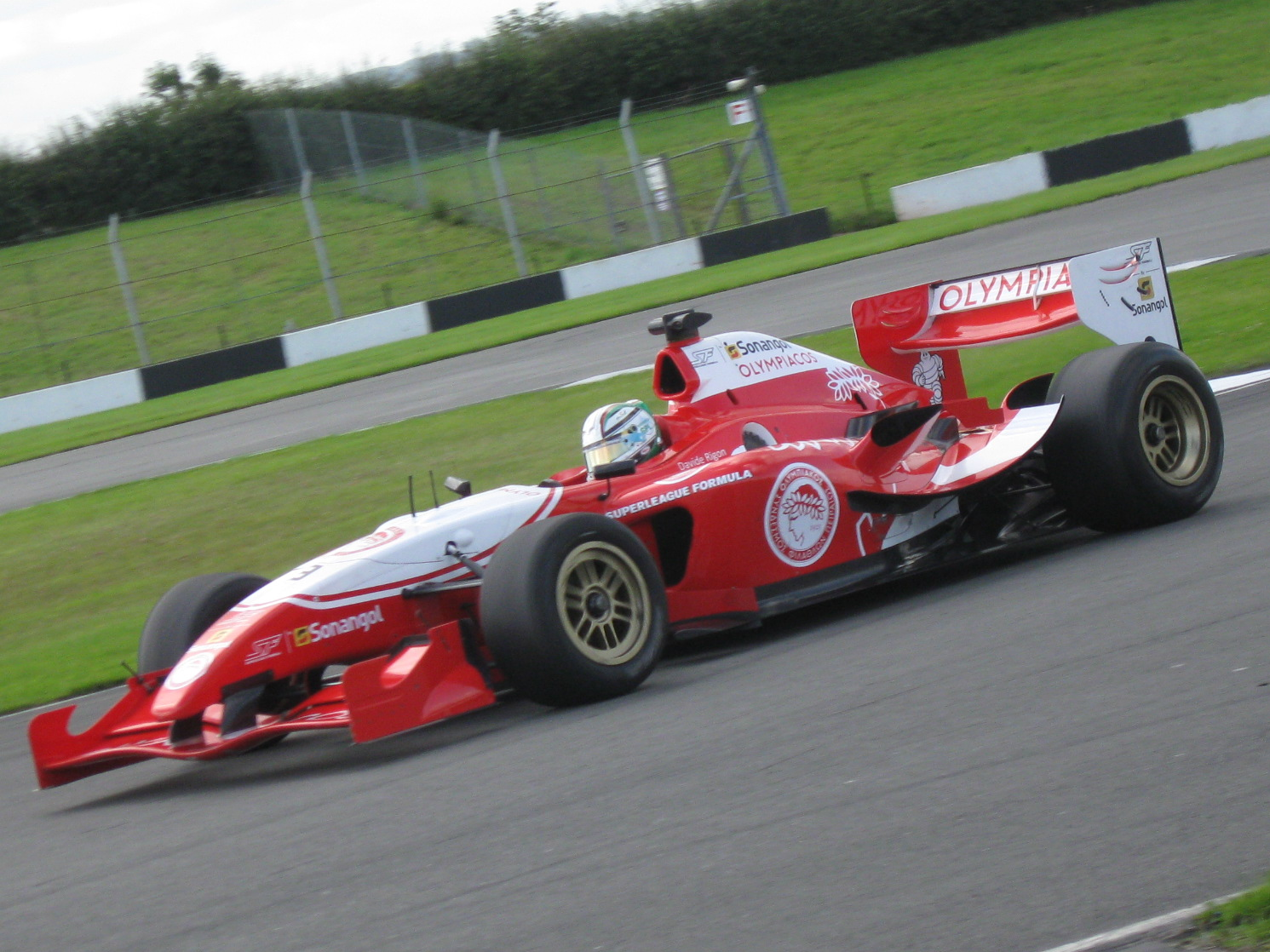
Davide Rigon in the Olympiacos car (2009)

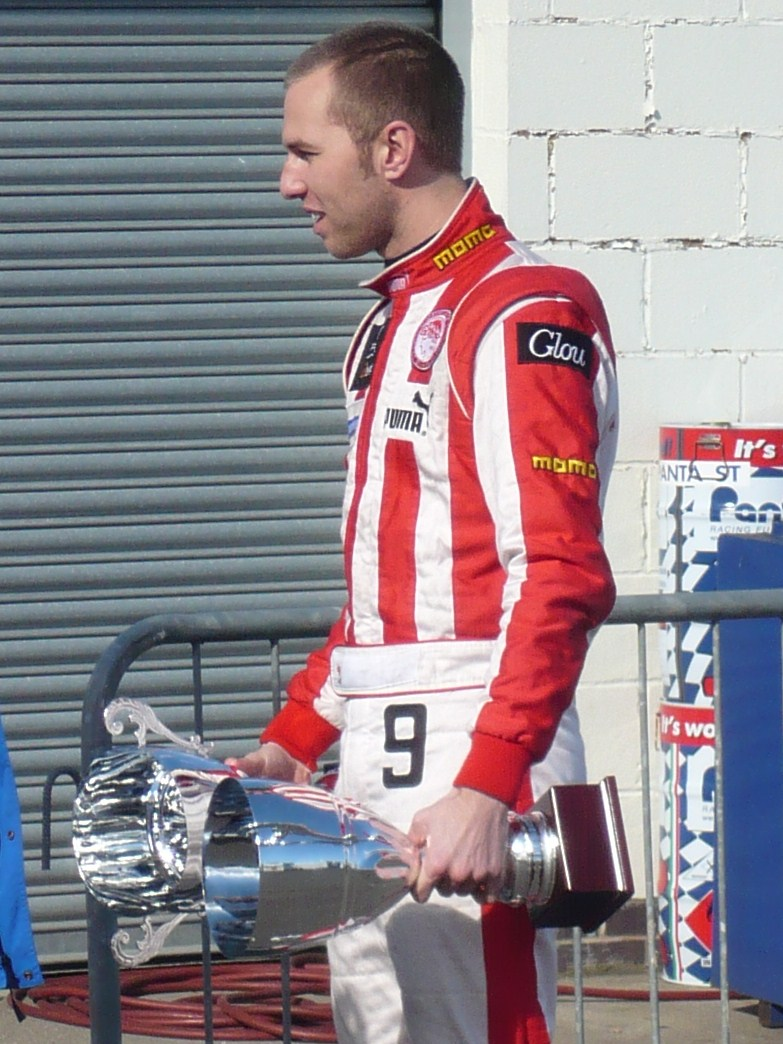
Olympiacos driver Chris van der Drift with his podium trophies at Silverstone (2010)

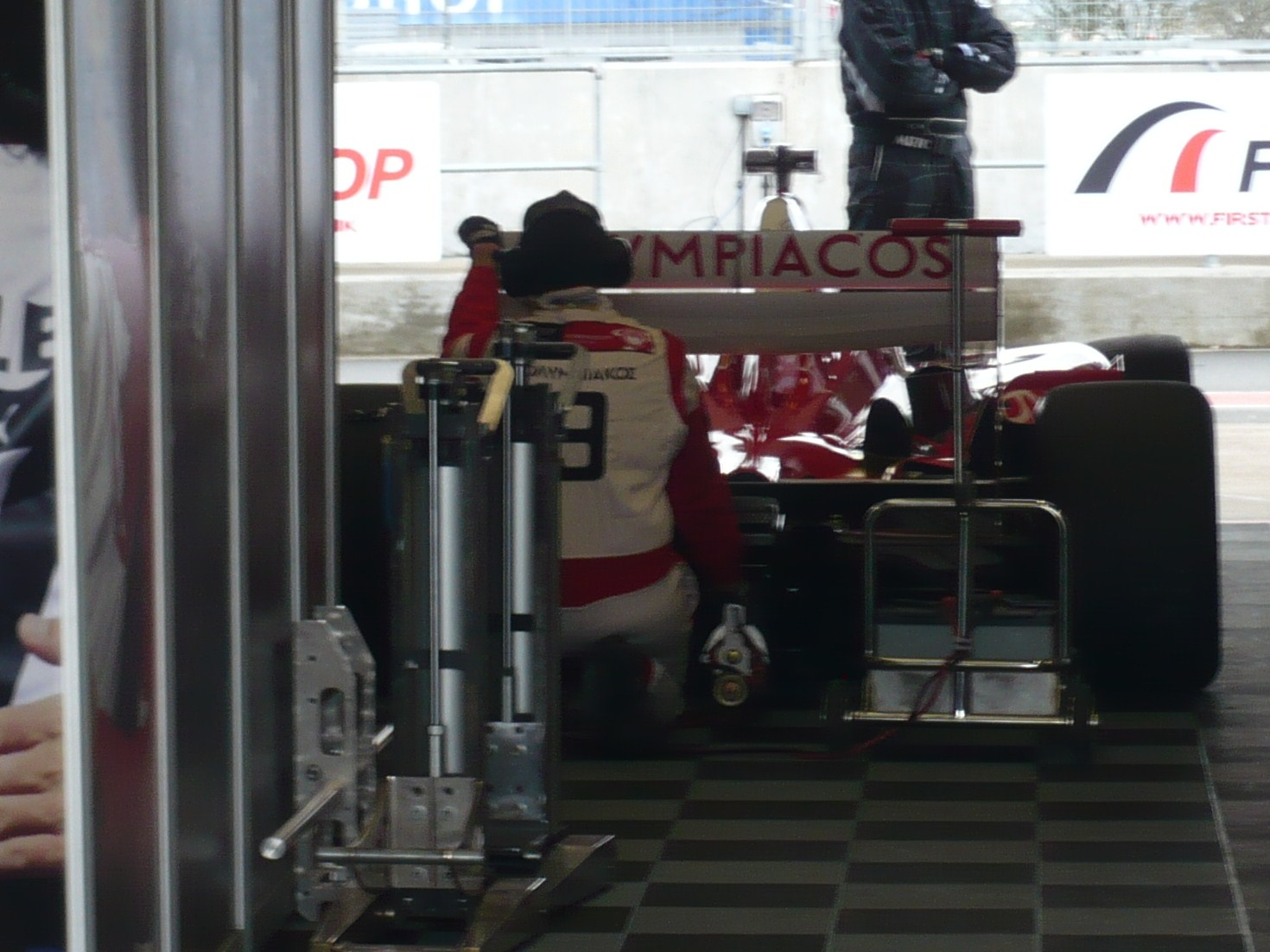
Olympiacos car in Silverstone Circuit (2010)
