= Hymn of Olympiacos =

Song
- Songwriter: Kostas Kilimantzos

The Hymn of Olympiacos or Thrile ton Gipedon (Legend of stadiums) is the anthem of the Greek multi-sport club Olympiacos CFP, based in Piraeus. The lyrics were written in 1980 by the Greek songwriter Kostas Kilimantzos, with Spiros Valsamakis being the composer. Christakis Voliotis was the first to perform the anthem.

Historically, the first hymn of Olympiacos was composed in 1931 by Mimis Vasiliadis (lyrics) and Yiangos Laoutaris (music). It was a march-style anthem and more oriented to football matches.

== Anthem ==
Greek Θρύλε των γηπέδων Ολυμπιακέ δαφνοστεφανωμένε μεγάλε και τρανέ, έχεις δύναμή σου Ολυμπιακέ τον πύρινό σου κόσμο που δε λυγά ποτέ. Ολυμπί-Ολυμπί-Ολυμπιακέ ομάδα ομαδάρα μου, μεγάλη μου αγάπη, Ολυμπιακάρα μου. Δόξα στα παιδιά σου Ολυμπιακέ χιλιοτραγουδισμένε, στον κόσμο ξακουστέ. Τρέμουν στ' άκουσμά σου Ολυμπιακέ κι ακόμα σε θυμούνται η Σάντος κι ο Πελέ. Ολυμπί-Ολυμπί-Ολυμπιακέ ομάδα ομαδάρα μου, μεγάλη μου αγάπη, Ολυμπιακάρα μου.	English Legend of stadiums, Olympiacos laurel-crowned, glorious and great, your power is your fiery fans who never yield. Olympi- Olympi- Olympiacos my best and biggest team of all, my great love, my great Olympiacos Glory to your children, Olympiacos a thousand songs have been sung for you, you're famous all over the world everyone trembles at the very sound of your name Pelé and Santos still remember your name. Olympi- Olympi- Olympiacos my best and biggest team of all, my great love, my great Olympiacos.
