= AiScout =

Football scouting app

aiScout is a football scouting app.

== History ==
aiScout was first developed by Darren Peries after his teenage son was released by the youth academy of English Premier League side Tottenham.

aiScout was put on the market after research which involved English Premier League side Chelsea. aiScout has partnered with Major League Soccer, the Sri Lanka and Wales Football Associations. In 2021, aiScout partnered with Burnley.

Besides England, aiScout has been used by clubs in Greece. The app has also been used by youth academies in India.

Used by several clubs including Chelsea, Nottingham Forest and Olympiacos will start using a mobile application called aiScout to help them search for new players. The app gives scouts data on soccer players’ athletic, cognitive and technical skills so that they can refine their searches.
