= List of Asian Games medalists in water polo =

Asian Games list

This is the complete list of Asian Games medalists in water polo from 1951 to 2022.

== Men ==
Games	Gold	Silver	Bronze
1951 New Delhi	India (IND); Jahan Ahir; Ganesh Das; D. Daver; R. Dean; Isaac Mansoor; G. Rattansey; Kanti Shah	Singapore (SIN); Lionel Chee; Ho Kian Bin; Kee Soon Bee; Barry Mitchell; Keith Mitchell; Sim Boon Hoon; Tan Hwee Hock; Tan Wee Eng; Wiebe Wolters	None awarded
1954 Manila	Singapore (SIN); Gan Eng Teck; Ho Kian Bin; Kee Soon Bee; Keith Mitchell; Oh Chwee Hock; Tan Eng Bock; Tan Hwee Hock; Wiebe Wolters	Japan (JPN); Hachiro Arakawa; Hirobumi Chige; Shunichi Hiroshiga; Teruyoshi Kanda; Shinichiro Koga; Takayoshi Matsufuji; Osamu Miyabe; Takanao Sado; Haosue Tajina; Nisei Tashiro	Indonesia (INA); Gashmir Daud; Djie Soen Kion; Djie Soen Kwah; Benjamin Idris; Liem Siong Lien; Lim Sing Lok; Margono; Oen Teng Pie; Otman Siragar; Bunasir Surachnad; Tio Tjoe Hong
1958 Tokyo	Japan (JPN); Hachiro Arakawa; Kanji Asanuma; Toshio Hashimoto; Mineo Kato; Motonobu Miyamura; Hiroshi Ono; Kensuke Sato; Takanao Sato; Masakazu Sawamura; Koki Takagi; Tsutomu Yusa	Singapore (SIN); Lionel Chee; Gan Eng Guan; Gan Eng Teck; Andrew Lim; Barry Mitchell; Derek Mitchell; Tan Eng Bock; Tan Eng Liang; Thio Gim Hock; Eric Yeo	Indonesia (INA); Benjamin Idris; Kuswara; Liem Siong Lien; Lim Sing Lok; Lim Sing Poen; Oei Teng Pie; Rudy Oen; Tio Tjoe Hong; Nicolaas Winter
1962 Jakarta	Japan (JPN); Hachiro Arakawa; Shigenobu Fujimoto; Norihide Iida; Hiroshi Inoue; Mineo Kato; Yoji Shimizu; Koki Takagi; Kazuya Takeuchi; Toru Takubo; Takashi Yokoyama	Indonesia (INA)	Singapore (SIN); Lionel Chee; Gan Eng Guan; Gan Eng Teck; Robert Khoo; Lim Teck Pan; Oei Boon Khwee; Pang Tee Ann; Quek Soo Kee; Tan Eng Bock; Thio Gim Hock; Eric Yeo
1966 Bangkok	Japan (JPN); Tadashi Fujimoto; Tetsunosuke Ishii; Hirokatsu Kuwayama; Koji Nakano; Seiya Sakamoto; Haruo Sato; Yoji Shimizu; Taira Sugawara; Einosuke Sumitani; Kazuya Takeuchi; Takashi Yokoyama	Singapore (SIN); Gan Eng Guan; Gan Eng Joo; Gan Eng Teck; Lim Ting Khiang; Pang Tee Ann; Su Hong Zee; Tan Eng Bock; Tan Eng Liang; Tan Thuan Heng; Tan Yam Cheng; Thio Gim Hock	Indonesia (INA)
1970 Bangkok	Japan (JPN); Hiroshi Hashimoto; Tatsuo Jihira; Shigeharu Kuwabara; Hirokatsu Kuwayama; Kaoru Matsunaga; Naoto Minegishi; Koji Nakano; Hideo Nishida; Yukiharu Oshita; Toshio Takahashi; Yoshihiro Yasumi	India (IND); Ashok Biswas; Tarun Goswami; Samir Kapadia; Bharat Merchant; Piyush Mitra; Abdul Mutlib; Pattabi Raman; Chandram Rana; Avinash Sarang; Deep Narayan Singh; Umad Singh	Indonesia (INA); Tengku Achmadsjah; Doddy Agussalim; Johanes Bambang Budihardja; Tengku Kamrol; Pandapotan Nasution; Zakaria Nasution; Gunawan Santoso; Rudy Sastranegara; Valentinus Sutandio; Ade Sutargi; Cebjar Hernowo Triono
1974 Tehran	Iran (IRN); Firouz Abdolmohammadian; Reza Kamrani; Abdolreza Majdpour; Dariush Movahedi; Hossein Nasim; Ahmad Peidayesh; Morteza Shariat; Heidar Shonjani; Bahram Tavakkoli; Jahangir Tavakkoli; Ahmad Yaghouti	China (CHN); Bao Xianliang; Li Derong; Li Jinkun; Lin Li; Lin Zhiquan; Peng Shaorong; Xiang Liande; Xie Runchen; Xu Lisan; Zhao Yinghua; Zhong Shenggen	Japan (JPN)
1978 Bangkok	China (CHN); Cai Shengliu; Cai Tianxiong; Li Jianming; Liao Yiping; Lu Zhouqian; Peng Bailing; Qu Baowei; Wang Jianguang; Wang Xiaotian; Xu Lisan; Zhang Huaguang	Japan (JPN); Akira Hara; Hiroshi Hasegawa; Kouji Hasegawa; Tadashi Kotani; Kunihiro Makihashi; Mamaru Matani; Masahiro Miyahara; Toshiyuki Miyahara; Masayuki Nagano; Hisao Oyamatsu; Kazuo Urushibara	Singapore (SIN); Ang Ban Gee; Ang Ban Leong; Ang Guan Hin; Stephen Chong; Gan Ai Teck; Kenneth Kee; Michael Kong; Lionel Liew; Soh Seng Thit; Teo Keng Soon; Teo Ming Chun
1982 New Delhi	China (CHN); Cai Shengliu; Cai Tianxiong; Chen Zhixiong; Deng Jun; Li Jianming; Li Jianxiong; Pan Shenghua; Qu Baowei; Song Weigang; Wang Minhui; Wang Xiaotian; Weng Tong; Zhao Bilong	Japan (JPN); Etsuji Fujita; Toshio Fukumoto; Akira Hara; Daisuke Houki; Shingo Kai; Go Kimura; Kunihiro Makihashi; Mamoru Matsui; Masahiro Miyahara; Toshiyuki Miyahara; Yoshifumi Saito; Toshinao Shimizu; Narihito Taima	India (IND); Hanumant Barge; Arul Charles; Ramen Das; Sanjay Karandikar; Sushil Kohli; Joseph Kuok; Mahesh Mangani; Rahul Mitra; Utpal Mitra; Prabhakaran Nair; Ramgopal Narayanan; Kanai Roy; Gyan Singh
1986 Seoul	China (CHN); Cai Shengliu; Cai Tianxiong; Deng Jun; Ge Jianqing; Guan Shishi; Huang Long; Li Jianxiong; Lin Jun; Tang Xiaoyu; Wang Minhui; Wang Xiaotian; Yang Yong; Zhao Bilong	South Korea (KOR); Choi Jang-jin; Choi Ki-cheol; Choi Sun-young; Kim Jae-yun; Kim Jin-tae; Kim Jung-yeol; Kim Ki-choon; Lee Jung-suk; Lee Tae-chang; Lee Taek-won; Mun Kong-yeob; Park Sang-won; Song Seung-ho	Singapore (SIN); Ang Ban Leong; Ang Kiat Wee; Choo Chin Cheng; Edison Foo; Alan Heng; Tony Koh; Leong Hoe Yin; Lim Teck Yin; Tan Hong Boon; Tay Thiam Hua; Teo Keng Soon; Teo Yong Khoon; Daniel Wee
1990 Beijing	China (CHN); Cai Shengliu; Cui Shiping; Deng Zhaorong; Ge Jianqing; Gong Dali; Huang Long; Huang Qijiang; Jiang Yihua; Lin Jun; Ni Shiwei; Wang Minhui; Xie Bin; Zheng Yong	Japan (JPN); Fumihiro Anzai; Toru Inagaki; Kuniaki Ito; Kunihiko Kobata; Kenichi Matsuo; Makihiro Motomiya; Hiroki Oka; Yoji Omoto; Kenichi Sato; Yushi Takano	South Korea (KOR); Ahn Sang-hoon; Chang Si-young; Jeong Bo-keun; Jeong Dong-seob; Jeong Yeong-sik; Kwon Oh-kil; Lee Jung-suk; Lee Sang-hyun; Lee Sang-won; Park Jong-gil; Park Moon-seon; Park Seok-beom; Yoo Seung-hoon
1994 Hiroshima	Kazakhstan (KAZ); Konstantin Chernov; Sergey Drozdov; Alexandr Elke; Igor Kharitonov; Alexandr Korotkov; Andrey Kryukov; Nurlan Mendygaliyev; Askar Orazalinov; Yevgeniy Prokhin; Thomas Schertwitis; Artemiy Sevostyanov; Igor Zagoruyko; Yevgeniy Zhilyayev	China (CHN); Deng Zhaorong; Feng Zewen; Gong Dali; Guo Peilin; Huang Long; Huang Qijiang; Jiang Yihua; Li Wenhua; Ni Shiwei; Peng Tong; Xu Dewen; Yang Yong; Zhao Bilong	Japan (JPN)
1998 Bangkok	Kazakhstan (KAZ); Konstantin Chernov; Roman Chentsov; Sergey Drozdov; Alexandr Elke; Mikhail Klochkov; Askar Orazalinov; Yevgeniy Prokhin; Artemiy Sevostyanov; Sergey Sevostyanov; Alexandr Shvedov; Igor Zagoruyko; Ivan Zaitsev; Yevgeniy Zhilyayev	Uzbekistan (UZB); Evgeniy Belov; Rinat Galeev; Denis Galkin; Evgeniy Kochergin; Aleksandr Komarov; Oleg Kornienko; Oleg Koryakov; Rais Kovyazin; Sergey Maximov; Ruslan Nasirov; Sergey Voronin; Aleksandr Yashnov; Aleksandr Yugai	China (CHN); Bai Jun; Cai Shuli; Chen Yaohua; Feng Zewen; Han Zhidong; He Qingzu; Hong Xicheng; Huang Yunquan; Li Wenhua; Shen Jie; Xu Guanghao; Yu Lijun; Zhou Hao
2002 Busan	Kazakhstan (KAZ); Alexandr Shvedov; Sergey Drozdov; Alexandr Gaidukov; Sergey Gorovoy; Askar Orazalinov; Ivan Zaitsev; Alexandr Shidlovskiy; Alexandr Kuzov; Yevgeniy Zhilyayev; Artemiy Sevostyanov; Yuriy Smoloviy; Damir Temyrkhanov; Alexandr Polukhin	Japan (JPN); Fumikazu Kubota; Daisuke Nakagawa; Satoshi Nagata; Takuya Endo; Koji Tanaka; Masakazu Yamamoto; Hiroyuki Matsubara; Atsushi Naganuma; Hiroshi Hoshiai; Taichi Sato; Yoshinori Shiota; Kan Aoyagi; Kenichi Sato	China (CHN); Ge Weiqing; Zhang Weiteng; Bai Jun; Yu Lijun; Xu Guanghao; Li Jun; Li Wenhua; Wang Yong; Zhu Junyi; Han Zhidong; Gui Jiye; Zhao Jinwen; Liao Qiuliang
2006 Doha	China (CHN); Ge Weiqing; Wu Zhiyu; Tan Feihu; Yu Lijun; Li Jun; Liang Zhongxing; Li Bin; Wang Yong; Guo Junliang; Xie Junmin; Han Zhidong; Liu Siwei	Japan (JPN); Tomonaga Eguchi; Kan Aoyagi; Yasuhiro Haraguchi; Naofumi Nishikakoi; Koji Tanaka; Shoichi Sakamoto; Koji Kobayashi; Atsushi Naganuma; Taichi Sato; Yoshinori Shiota; Hiroshi Hoshiai; Satoshi Nagata; Hitoshi Oshima	Kazakhstan (KAZ); Alexandr Shvedov; Sergey Gorovoy; Azamat Zhulumbetov; Yevgeniy Medvedev; Alan Orazalinov; Ruslan Orazalinov; Damir Temyrkhanov; Ivan Zaitsev; Rustam Ukumanov; Alexandr Gaidukov; Ravil Manafov; Adil Temyrkhanov; Dmitriy Axyonkin
2010 Guangzhou	Kazakhstan (KAZ); Alexandr Shvedov; Sergey Gubarev; Alexandr Gaidukov; Murat Shakenov; Alexey Panfili; Roman Pilipenko; Alexandr Axenov; Rustam Ukumanov; Yevgeniy Zhilyayev; Mikhail Ruday; Ravil Manafov; Azamat Zhulumbetov; Nikolay Maximov	China (CHN); Ge Weiqing; Tan Feihu; Liang Zhongxing; Yu Lijun; Guo Junliang; Pan Ning; Li Bin; Wang Yang; Xie Junmin; Wang Beiming; Han Zhidong; Jiang Bin; Huang Meicai	Japan (JPN); Katsuyuki Tanamura; Mitsuaki Shiga; Kan Irei; Koji Takei; Kan Aoyagi; Hiroki Wakamatsu; Yusuke Shimizu; Akira Yanase; Koji Kobayashi; Yoshinori Shiota; Atsushi Naganuma; Satoshi Nagata; Shota Hazui
2014 Incheon	Kazakhstan (KAZ); Madikhan Makhmetov; Sergey Gubarev; Alexandr Axenov; Roman Pilipenko; Vladimir Ushakov; Alexey Shmider; Murat Shakenov; Anton Koliadenko; Rustam Ukumanov; Andrey Rekechinskiy; Alexey Panfili; Branko Peković; Alexandr Fedorov	Japan (JPN); Katsuyuki Tanamura; Seiya Adachi; Atsushi Arai; Mitsuaki Shiga; Akira Yanase; Yuta Henmi; Yusuke Shimizu; Yuki Kadono; Koji Takei; Kenya Yasuda; Keigo Okawa; Shota Hazui; Tomoyoshi Fukushima	China (CHN); Wu Honghui; Tan Feihu; Liang Zhongxing; Yu Lijun; Guo Junliang; Pan Ning; Li Bin; Wang Yang; Dong Tao; Chen Jinghao; Zhang Chufeng; Liang Nianxiang; Liang Zhiwei
2018 Jakarta–Palembang	Kazakhstan (KAZ); Pavel Lipilin; Yevgeniy Medvedev; Ruslan Akhmetov; Roman Pilipenko; Miras Aubakirov; Alexey Shmider; Murat Shakenov; Altay Altayev; Rustam Ukumanov; Mikhail Ruday; Ravil Manafov; Yulian Verdesh; Valeriy Shlemov	Japan (JPN); Katsuyuki Tanamura; Seiya Adachi; Harukiirario Koppu; Mitsuaki Shiga; Takuma Yoshida; Atsuto Iida; Takumu Miyazawa; Mitsuru Takata; Atsushi Arai; Yusuke Inaba; Keigo Okawa; Kenta Araki; Tomoyoshi Fukushima	Iran (IRI); Omid Lotfpour; Peyman Asadi; Amir Hossein Rahbar; Hamed Malek-Khanbanan; Amir Hossein Keyhani; Ali Pirouzkhah; Amir Dehdari; Mehdi Yazdankhah; Soheil Rostamian; Mohammad Javad Abbasi; Arshia Almasi; Hossein Khaledi; Shayan Ghasemi
2022 Hangzhou	Japan (JPN); Katsuyuki Tanamura; Seiya Adachi; Taiyo Watanabe; Daichi Ogihara; Ikkei Nitta; Toi Suzuki; Kiyomu Date; Mitsuru Takata; Atsushi Arai; Yusuke Inaba; Keigo Okawa; Kenta Araki; Towa Nishimura	China (CHN); Wu Honghui; Hu Zhangxin; Chu Chenghao; Peng Jiahao; Zhang Jinpeng; Xie Zekai; Chen Zhongxian; Chen Rui; Chen Yimin; Liu Yu; Zhang Chufeng; Tan Feihu; Liang Zhiwei	Kazakhstan (KAZ); Temirlan Balfanbayev; Eduard Tsoy; Yegor Beloussov; Dušan Marković; Danil Artyukh; Alexey Shmider; Murat Shakenov; Srđan Vuksanović; Rustam Ukumanov; Mikhail Ruday; Ruslan Akhmetov; Sultan Shonzhigitov; Daniil Matolinets

== Women ==
Games	Gold	Silver	Bronze
2010 Guangzhou	China (CHN); Yang Jun; Teng Fei; Liu Ping; Sun Yujun; He Jin; Sun Yating; Song Donglun; Zhang Weiwei; Wang Yi; Ma Huanhuan; Sun Huizi; Zhang Lei; Wang Ying	Kazakhstan (KAZ); Galina Rytova; Natalya Shepelina; Kamila Zakirova; Anna Turova; Liliya Falaleyeva; Anna Zubkova; Zamira Myrzabekova; Yekaterina Gariyeva; Aizhan Akilbayeva; Marina Gritsenko; Yelena Chebotova; Assem Mussarova; Alexandra Turova	Uzbekistan (UZB); Anastasiya Skovpina; Diana Dadabaeva; Aleksandra Sarancha; Eseniya Piftor; Evgeniya Ivanova; Natalya Plyusova; Anna Shcheglova; Ramilya Khalikova; Adelina Zinurova; Olga Mayorova; Anna Plyusova; Elena Dukhanova
2014 Incheon	China (CHN); Yang Jun; Li Shujin; Liu Ping; Sun Yujun; Chen Huili; Sun Yating; Song Donglun; Zhang Cong; Zhao Zihan; Tian Jianing; Wang Xinyan; Lu Yiwen; Peng Lin	Japan (JPN); Rikako Miura; Midori Sugiyama; Saki Ogawa; Shino Magariyama; Moe Nakata; Ayaka Takahashi; Yumi Nakano; Misa Shiga; Yumi Kojo; Tsubasa Mori; Erina Kakiichi; Mitsuki Hashiguchi; Yuko Umeda	Kazakhstan (KAZ); Alexandra Zharkova; Natalya Shepelina; Aizhan Akilbayeva; Anna Turova; Kamila Zakirova; Anastassiya Mirshina; Zamira Myrzabekova; Oxana Saichuk; Assel Jakayeva; Marina Gritsenko; Natalya Alexandrova; Aruzhan Yegemberdiyeva; Kristina Krassikova
2018 Jakarta–Palembang	China (CHN); Peng Lin; Zhai Ying; Mei Xiaohan; Xiong Dunhan; Niu Guannan; Guo Ning; Nong Sanfeng; Zhang Cong; Wang Huan; Zhang Danyi; Chen Xiao; Zhang Jing; Shen Yineng	Kazakhstan (KAZ); Alexandra Zharkimbayeva; Oxana Saichuk; Aizhan Akilbayeva; Anna Turova; Anastassiya Yeremina; Darya Roga; Anna Novikova; Sivilya Raiter; Shakhzoda Mansurova; Zamira Myrzabekova; Anastassiya Mirshina; Anastassiya Murataliyeva; Azhar Alibayeva	Japan (JPN); Minami Shioya; Yumi Arima; Akari Inaba; Shino Magariyama; Chiaki Sakanoue; Minori Yamamoto; Maiko Hashida; Yuki Niizawa; Kana Hosoya; Misaki Noro; Marina Tokumoto; Kotori Suzuki; Miyuu Aoki
2022 Hangzhou	China (CHN); Zhang Jiaqi; Yan Siya; Yan Jing; Xiong Dunhan; Zhai Ying; Wang Shiyun; Lu Yiwen; Wang Huan; Deng Zewen; Nong Sanfeng; Chen Xiao; Zhang Jing; Dong Wenxin	Japan (JPN); Minami Shioya; Yumi Arima; Akari Inaba; Eruna Ura; Kako Kawaguchi; Hikaru Shitara; Ai Sunabe; Eri Kitamura; Kiyoka Goto; Fuka Nishiyama; Momo Inoue	Kazakhstan (KAZ); Alexandra Zharkimbayeva; Darya Pochinok; Anastassiya Glukhova; Viktoriya Kaplun; Valeriya Anossova; Madina Rakhmanova; Anna Novikova; Yelizaveta Rudneva; Milena Nabiyeva; Viktoriya Khritankova; Anastassiya Mirshina; Anastassiya Tsoy; Mariya Martynenko
