= Water polo at the Asian Games =

- Governing bodies: AQUA (World) / AA (Asia)
- Events: 2 (men: 1; women: 1)

Games
- 1951; 1954; 1958; 1962; 1966; 1970; 1974; 1978; 1982; 1986; 1990; 1994; 1998; 2002; 2006; 2010; 2014; 2018; 2022; 2026
- Medalists

Water polo has been contested at the Asian Games since 1951 in New Delhi, India.

== Summary ==
=== Men ===
#	Year	Host	Final			Third place match			Teams
#	Year	Host	Winner	Score	Runner-up	3rd place	Score	4th place	Teams
1	1951	(India); New Delhi	India	6–4	Singapore	None awarded			2
2	1954	(Philippines); Manila	Singapore	4–2	Japan	Indonesia	8–5	Hong Kong	6
3	1958	(Japan); Tokyo	Japan	No playoffs	Singapore	Indonesia	No playoffs	Hong Kong	5
4	1962	(Indonesia); Jakarta	Japan	No playoffs	Indonesia	Singapore	No playoffs	Hong Kong	4
5	1966	(Thailand); Bangkok	Japan	No playoffs	Singapore	Indonesia	No playoffs	Malaysia	5
6	1970	(Thailand); Bangkok	Japan	4–2	India	Indonesia	5–2	Iran	7
7	1974	(Iran); Tehran	Iran	No playoffs	China	Japan	No playoffs	North Korea	7
8	1978	(Thailand); Bangkok	China	No playoffs	Japan	Singapore	No playoffs	North Korea	7
9	1982	(India); New Delhi	China	11–10	Japan	India	8–7	Singapore	8
10	1986	(South Korea); Seoul	China	No playoffs	South Korea	Singapore	No playoffs	Iran	6
11	1990	(China); Beijing	China	10–7	Japan	South Korea	9–8	Singapore	7
12	1994	(Japan); Hiroshima	Kazakhstan	No playoffs	China	Japan	No playoffs	Iran	6
13	1998	(Thailand); Bangkok	Kazakhstan	No playoffs	Uzbekistan	China	No playoffs	Japan	9
14	2002	(South Korea); Busan	Kazakhstan	10–10 OT (5–4) pen	Japan	China	10–6	Iran	6
15	2006	(Qatar); Doha	China	9–8	Japan	Kazakhstan	12–8	Iran	10
16	2010	(China); Guangzhou	Kazakhstan	7–6	China	Japan	19–5	South Korea	9
17	2014	(South Korea); Incheon	Kazakhstan	7–6	Japan	China	14–6	South Korea	7
18	2018	(Indonesia); Jakarta–Palembang	Kazakhstan	8–7	Japan	Iran	8–8 (8–7) pen	China	9
19	2022	(China); Hangzhou	Japan	11–7	China	Kazakhstan	7–7 (3–2) pen	Iran	8
20	2026	(Japan); Nagoya	Japan	24–7	Kazakhstan	China	13–9	Iran	8

=== Women ===
#	Year	Host	Final			Third place match			Teams
#	Year	Host	Winner	Score	Runner-up	3rd place	Score	4th place	Teams
1	2010	(China); Guangzhou	China	No playoffs	Kazakhstan	Uzbekistan	No playoffs	India	4
2	2014	(South Korea); Incheon	China	No playoffs	Japan	Kazakhstan	No playoffs	Uzbekistan	6
3	2018	(Indonesia); Jakarta–Palembang	China	No playoffs	Kazakhstan	Japan	No playoffs	Thailand	6
4	2022	(China); Hangzhou	China	No playoffs	Japan	Kazakhstan	No playoffs	Singapore	7
5	2026	(Japan); Nagoya	China	No playoffs	Japan	Thailand	No playoffs	Kazakhstan	6

== Medal table ==
=== Total ===
Rank	Nation	Gold	Silver	Bronze	Total
1	China (CHN)	10	4	4	18
2	Japan (JPN)	6	11	4	21
3	Kazakhstan (KAZ)	6	3	4	13
4	Singapore (SGP)	1	3	3	7
5	India (IND)	1	1	1	3
6	Iran (IRI)	1	0	1	2
7	Indonesia (INA)	0	1	4	5
8	South Korea (KOR)	0	1	1	2
8	Uzbekistan (UZB)	0	1	1	2
10	Thailand (THA)	0	0	1	1
Totals (10 entries)		25	25	24	74

=== Men ===
Rank	Nation	Gold	Silver	Bronze	Total
1	Japan (JPN)	6	8	3	17
2	Kazakhstan (KAZ)	6	1	2	9
3	China (CHN)	5	4	4	13
4	Singapore (SGP)	1	3	3	7
5	India (IND)	1	1	1	3
6	Iran (IRI)	1	0	1	2
7	Indonesia (INA)	0	1	4	5
8	South Korea (KOR)	0	1	1	2
9	Uzbekistan (UZB)	0	1	0	1
Totals (9 entries)		20	20	19	59

=== Women ===
Rank	Nation	Gold	Silver	Bronze	Total
1	China (CHN)	5	0	0	5
2	Japan (JPN)	0	3	1	4
3	Kazakhstan (KAZ)	0	2	2	4
4	Thailand (THA)	0	0	1	1
4	Uzbekistan (UZB)	0	0	1	1
Totals (5 entries)		5	5	5	15

== Participating nations ==
=== Men ===
Team	(India) 1951	(Philippines) 1954	(Japan) 1958	(Indonesia) 1962	(Thailand) 1966	(Thailand) 1970	(Iran) 1974	(Thailand) 1978	(India) 1982	(South Korea) 1986	(China) 1990	(Japan) 1994	(Thailand) 1998	(South Korea) 2002	(Qatar) 2006	(China) 2010	(South Korea) 2014	(Indonesia) 2018	(China) 2022	(Japan) 2026	Years
Bangladesh									8th												1
China							2nd	1st	1st	1st	1st	2nd	3rd	3rd	1st	2nd	3rd	4th	2nd	3rd	14
Chinese Taipei		5th																			1
Hong Kong		4th	4th	4th				7th	7th		7th		8th		9th	8th	7th	9th	7th	6th	13
India	1st					2nd	6th		3rd	6th											5
Indonesia		3rd	3rd	2nd	3rd	3rd												8th			6
Iran						4th	1st			4th	6th	4th	5th	4th	4th			3rd	4th	4th	11
Japan		2nd	1st	1st	1st	1st	3rd	2nd	2nd		2nd	3rd	4th	2nd	2nd	3rd	2nd	2nd	1st	1st	18
Kazakhstan												1st	1st	1st	3rd	1st	1st	1st	3rd	2nd	9
Kuwait							7th	6th	5th	5th			9th			5th	6th				7
Malaysia					4th	6th															2
North Korea							4th	4th			5th										3
Philippines		6th	5th												10th						3
Qatar															8th	9th					2
Saudi Arabia									6th						6th	7th		7th			4
Singapore	2nd	1st	2nd	3rd	2nd	5th	5th	3rd	4th	3rd	4th	6th	6th	6th		6th	5th	6th	5th	7th	19
South Korea										2nd	3rd	5th		5th	7th	4th	4th	5th	6th	5th	10
Thailand					5th	7th		5th					7th						8th	8th	6
Uzbekistan													2nd		5th						2
Teams (19)	2	6	5	4	5	7	7	7	8	6	7	6	9	6	10	9	7	9	8	8	

=== Women ===
Team	(China) 2010	(South Korea) 2014	(Indonesia) 2018	(China) 2022	(Japan) 2026	Years
China	1st	1st	1st	1st	1st	5
Hong Kong		6th	6th			2
India	4th					1
Indonesia			5th			1
Japan		2nd	3rd	2nd	2nd	4
Kazakhstan	2nd	3rd	2nd	3rd	4th	5
Singapore		5th		4th	6th	3
South Korea				7th		1
Thailand			4th	5th	3rd	3
Uzbekistan	3rd	4th		6th	5th	4
Teams (10)	4	6	6	7	6	

== See also ==
- Asian Water Polo Championship
- Asian Water Polo Cup
- Asian Swimming Championships
