= Iran men's national water polo team =

Iran
- FINA code: IRI
- Nickname(s): Team Melli
- Association: IR Iran Amateur Swimming Federation
- Confederation: AASF (Asia)
- Head coach: Aleksandar Ćirić
- Asst coach: Vahid Rezaei
- Captain: Hamed Malek-Khanbanan
- Home venue: Shahid Shiroudi Stadium

Olympic Games
- Appearances: 1 (first in 1976)
- Best result: 12th place (1976)

World Championship
- Appearances: 2 (first in 1975)
- Best result: 15th place (1975, 1998)

World League
- Appearances: 4 (first in 2008)
- Best result: Preliminary round (2008, 2009, 2010)

Asian Games
- Appearances: 10 (first in 1970)
- Best result: (gold) Gold medal (1974)

Iran men's national water polo team
Medal record

Asian Games
Gold medal – first place	1974 Tehran	Team
Bronze medal – third place	2018 Jakarta	Team

The Iran men's national water polo team represents Iran in men's international water polo competitions and is controlled by the IR Iran Amateur Swimming Federation.

== Tournament records ==
=== Olympic Games ===
Year	NoT	Rank	Pld	W	D	L
1900–1936	not an IOC member					
(United Kingdom) 1948	18	did not enter				
(Finland) 1952	21	did not enter				
(Australia) 1956	10	did not enter				
(Italy) 1960	16	did not enter				
(Japan) 1964	13	did not enter				
(Mexico) 1968	15	did not enter				
(West Germany) 1972	16	did not qualify				
(Canada) 1976	12	12th place	8	0	0	8
(Soviet Union) 1980	12	did not enter				
(United States) 1984	12	did not enter				
(South Korea) 1988	12	did not enter				
(Spain) 1992	12	did not enter				
(United States) 1996	12	did not qualify				
(Australia) 2000	12	did not enter				
(Greece) 2004	12	did not enter				
(China) 2008	12	did not qualify				
(United Kingdom) 2012	12	did not enter				
(Brazil) 2016	12	did not qualify				
(Japan) 2020	12	did not qualify				
(France) 2024	12	did not qualify				

=== World Championships ===
World Championships record
Year	Round	Position	Pld	W	D	L	GF	GA	GD
(Socialist Federal Republic of Yugoslavia) 1973	did not compete								
(Colombia) 1975	Preliminary round	15th place	3	0	0	3	5	39	-34
(West Germany) 1978	did not compete								
(Ecuador) 1982	did not compete								
(Spain) 1986	did not compete								
(Australia) 1991	did not compete								
(Italy) 1994	did not compete								
(Australia) 1998	Preliminary round	15th place	3	0	0	3	7	-49	-42
(Japan) 2001	did not compete								
(Spain) 2003	did not compete								
(Canada) 2005	did not compete								
(Australia) 2007	did not compete								
(Italy) 2009	did not compete								
(China) 2011	did not compete								
(Spain) 2013	did not compete								
(Russia) 2015	did not compete								
(Hungary) 2017	did not compete								
(South Korea) 2019	did not compete								
(Hungary) 2022	did not compete								

=== World League / World Cup ===
Year	Rank	Pld	W	L
(Greece) 2002	did not enter			
(United States) 2003	did not enter			
(United States) 2004	did not enter			
(Serbia and Montenegro) 2005	did not enter			
(Greece) 2006	did not enter			
(Germany) 2007	did not enter			
(Italy) 2008	5th place in Asia/Oceania	8	0	8
(Montenegro) 2009	3rd place in Asia/Oceania	6	2	4
(Serbia) 2010	6th place in Asia/Oceania	10	0	10
(Italy) 2011	did not enter			
(Kazakhstan) 2012	did not enter			
(Russia) 2013	did not enter			
(United Arab Emirates) 2014	did not enter			
(Italy) 2015	did not enter			
(China) 2016	did not enter			
(Russia) 2017	did not enter			
(Hungary) 2018	did not enter			
(Serbia) 2019	did not enter			
(Georgia (country)) 2020	did not enter			
(France) 2022	did not enter			
(United States) 2023	5th place in Division 2	4	2	2
(Turkey) 2025	4th place in Division 2	4	3	2

=== World Cup (old format) ===
Year	NoT	Rank	Pld	W	D	L
(Socialist Federal Republic of Yugoslavia) 1979	8	did not enter				
(United States) 1981	8	did not enter				
(United States) 1983	8	did not enter				
(West Germany) 1985	8	did not enter				
(Greece) 1987	8	did not enter				
(West Germany) 1989	8	did not enter				
(Spain) 1991	8	did not enter				
(Greece) 1993	8	did not enter				
(United States) 1995	8	did not enter				
(Greece) 1997	8	did not enter				
(Australia) 1999	8	did not enter				
(West Germany) 2002	8	did not enter				
(Hungary) 2006	8	did not enter				
(Romania) 2010	8	Quarter-finals	6	0	0	6
(Kazakhstan) 2014	8	did not enter				
(Germany) 2018	8	did not enter				

=== Asian Games ===
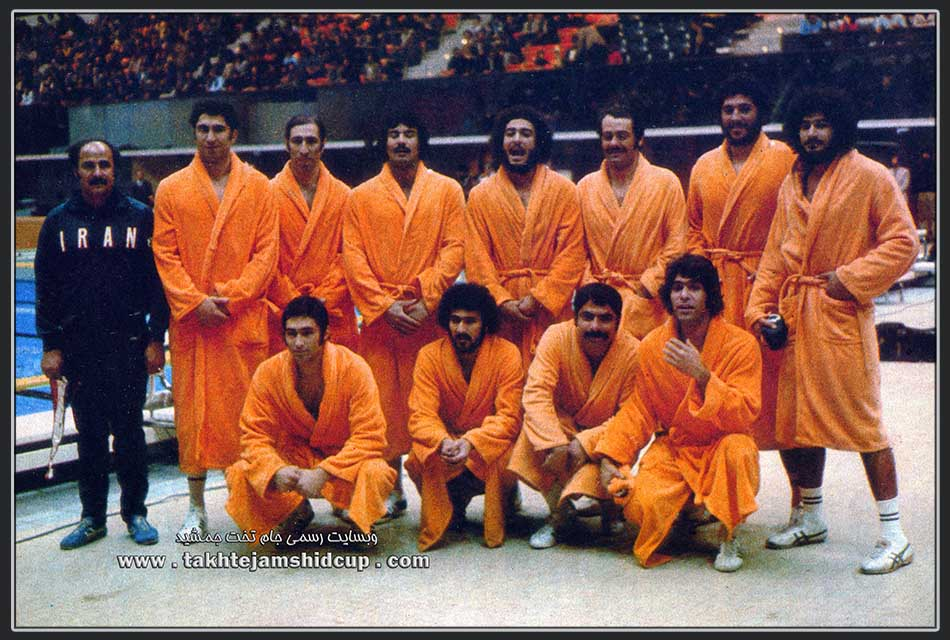
Iran water polo team in 1973 before a friendly match with Egypt. This team won the Asian Games one year later.

Year	NoT	Rank	Pld	W	D	L
(India) 1951	2	did not enter				
(Philippines) 1954	6	did not enter				
(Japan) 1958	5	did not enter				
(Indonesia) 1962	4	did not enter				
(Thailand) 1966	5	did not enter				
(Thailand) 1970	7	4th place	4	0	1	3
(Iran) 1974	7	Champions	6	4	2	0
(Thailand) 1978	7	did not enter				
(India) 1982	8	did not enter				
(South Korea) 1986	6	4th place	5	2	1	2
(China) 1990	7	6th place	4	1	1	2
(Japan) 1994	6	4th place	5	2	0	3
(Thailand) 1998	9	5th place	6	2	0	4
(South Korea) 2002	6	4th place	4	1	0	3
(Qatar) 2006	10	4th place	6	3	1	2
(China) 2010	9	did not enter				
(South Korea) 2014	7	did not enter				
(Indonesia) 2018	9	3rd place	6	4	0	2
(China) 2022	8	4th place	6	3	0	3

=== Asian Championships ===
Year	NoT	Rank	Pld	W	D	L
(South Korea) 1984	7	3rd place	5	3	1	1
(China) 1988	6	did not enter				
(Japan) 1991	10	5th place				
(Thailand) 1995	13	3rd place	4	3	0	1
(South Korea) 2000	7	did not enter				
(China) 2005	8	did not enter				
(China) 2009	6	did not enter				
(Japan) 2012	4	did not enter				
(United Arab Emirates) 2012	9	did not enter				
(China) 2015	5	4th place	4	1	0	3
(Japan) 2016	8	4th place	6	3	0	3
(Thailand) 2022	10	4th place	7	5	0	2
(Singapore) 2023	8	Runners-up	6	5	0	1
(China) 2025	9	4th place	7	4	0	3
(India) 2025	9	Runners-up	6	5	0	1

=== Asian Cup ===
Year	NoT	Rank	Pld	W	D	L
(China) 2010	4	Runners-up	3	2	0	1
(Kuwait) 2012	5	3rd place	4	2	0	2
(Singapore) 2013	6	Champions	5	5	0	0

=== FINA Development Trophy ===
Year	NoT	Rank	Pld	W	D	L
(Kuwait) 2007	12	3rd place	6	5	0	1
(Kuwait) 2009	12	did not enter				
(Saudi Arabia) 2011	11	Runners-up	6	5	0	1
(Kuwait) 2013	12	did not enter				
(Iran) 2015	10	Champions	5	5	0	0
(Malta) 2017	8	disqualified	6	5	0	1

=== Islamic Solidarity Games ===
Year	NoT	Rank	Pld	W	D	L
(Saudi Arabia) 2005	6	4th place	5	2	1	2
(Azerbaijan) 2017	5	Runners-up	4	3	1	0

== Former coaches ==
- (Romania) Nico Firoiu (1969–71, 1972–74)
- (Croatia) Ante Nakić
- (Croatia) Neven Kovačević
- (Kazakhstan) Stanislav Pivovarov (2010)
- (Italy) Paolo Malara (2011)
- (Slovakia) Roman Poláčik (2011–2012)
- (Italy) Paolo Malara (2013–2014)
- (Iran) Sirous Taherian (2014--2016)
