= Indonesia men's national water polo team =

Indonesia
- FINA code: INA
- Confederation: AASF (Asia)
- Head coach: Nikola Milosavljevic

Asian Games
- Appearances: 6 (first in 1954)
- Best result: (silver) (1962)
Medal record
Event	1st	2nd	3rd
Asian Games	0	1	4
Southeast Asian Games	1	3	1
Total	1	4	5
Asian Games
Bronze medal – third place	1954 Philippines	Team
Bronze medal – third place	1958 Japan	Team
Bronze medal – third place	1966 Thailand	Team
Bronze medal – third place	1970 Thailand	Team
Silver medal – second place	1962 Jakarta	Team
Southeast Asian Games
Bronze medal – third place	2001 Kuala Lumpur	Team
Silver medal – second place	2019 Naw Pyi Daw	Team
Silver medal – second place	2015 Singapore	Team
Silver medal – second place	2017 Malaysia	Team
Silver medal – second place	2023 Cambodia	Team
Gold medal – first place	2019 Philippines	Team

The Indonesia men's national water polo team represents Indonesia in international men's water polo. The team won the gold medal at the Southeast Asian Games in 2019. The team made their debut at the Asian Games in 1954. The team won the silver medal at the Asian Games in 1962, Jakarta, Indonesia.

== Competition history ==
A red box around the year indicates tournaments played within Indonesia and best results"

=== Asian Games ===
Asian Games record
Host / Year	Position	Pld	W	D	L
(India) 1951	Did not enter				
(Philippines) 1954	3rd place, bronze medalist(s)	3	2	0	1
(Japan) 1958	3rd place, bronze medalist(s)	4	2	0	2
(Indonesia) 1962	2nd place, silver medalist(s)	3	1	0	1
(Thailand) 1966	3rd place, bronze medalist(s)	4	2	0	2
(Thailand) 1970	3rd place, bronze medalist(s)	5	3	0	2
(Iran) 1974	Did not enter				
(Thailand) 1978	Did not enter				
(India) 1982	Did not enter				
(South Korea) 1986	Did not enter				
(China) 1990	Did not enter				
(Japan) 1994	Did not enter				
(Thailand) 1998	Did not enter				
(South Korea) 2002	Did not enter				
(Qatar) 2006	Did not enter				
(China) 2010	Did not enter				
(South Korea) 2014	Did not enter				
(Indonesia) 2018	8th place	7	1	1	5
(China) 2022	Did not enter				
Total	6/19	26	11	1	14

=== Southeast Asian Games ===
Southeast Asian Games record
Host / Year	Position	Pld	W	D	L
(Malaysia) 2001	3rd place, bronze medalist(s)	—N/a			
(Myanmar) 2013	2nd place, silver medalist(s)	4	3	1	0
(Singapore) 2015	2nd place, silver medalist(s)	4	3	0	1
(Malaysia) 2017	2nd place, silver medalist(s)	4	3	1	0
(Philippines) 2019	1st place, gold medalist(s)	4	3	1	0
(Cambodia) 2023	2nd place, silver medalist(s)	6	5	0	1
Total	6/6	22	17	3	2

== Coaches ==
Period	Coach
2022–	Serbia Nikola Milosavljević

== Squads ==
Indonesia
- Novian Dwi Putra
- Ridjkie Mulia Harahap
- Reza Aditya Putra
- Beby Willy Eka Paksi Tarigan
- Fakri Mahmud
- Zaenal Arifin
- Rian Rinaldo
- Yusuf Budiman
- Brandley Ignatius Legawa
- Revanza Rizky Rahman
- Hizkia Bimantoro
- Ahmad Fauzy Mappatabe
- Richley Gregorius Legawa
- Gilang Nabhil Saputra
- Jeremy Dillon Latuheru
- Gyasi Kahlitijani Parikesit
- Muhammad Fadil
- Sawung Chandra
