= Asian Water Polo Cup =

International water polo competition

The Asian Water Polo Cup was an international water polo competition organized by the Asia Swimming Federation (AASF) until 2013.

== Summaries ==
=== Men ===
Year	Host	Champion	Runner-up	Third place	Dates
2010	(China); Chengdu	China	Iran	South Korea	March
2012	Kuwait City	Kazakhstan	Kuwait	Iran	March
2013	Singapore	Iran	Singapore	Kuwait	Oct 5 – Sep 30

=== Women ===
Year	Host	Champion	Runner-up	Third place	Dates
2013	Singapore	China	Singapore	Thailand	Oct 5 – Sep 30

== Participating nations ==
=== Men ===
Team	(China) 2010	(Kuwait) 2012	(Singapore) 2013	Years
China	1st		4th	2
Hong Kong	4th			1
Indonesia		5th		1
Iran	2nd	3rd	1st	3
Kazakhstan		1st		1
Kuwait		2nd	3rd	2
Philippines			5th	1
Singapore			2nd	2
South Korea	3rd			1
Sri Lanka			6th	1
Uzbekistan		4th		1
Total	4	5	6	

=== Women ===
Team	(Singapore) 2013	Years
China	1st	1
Philippines	4th	1
Singapore	2nd	1
Sri Lanka	5th	1
Thailand	3rd	1
Total	5	

== See also ==
- Water polo at the Asian Games
- Asian Swimming Championships
- Asian Water Polo Championship
