= Japan men's national water polo team =

Men's national water polo team representing Japan

Japan
- FINA code: JPN
- Nickname(s): ポセイドン ジャパン(Poseidon Japan)
- Association: Japan Swimming Federation
- Confederation: AASF (Asia)
- Head coach: Yoshinori Shiota
- Asst coach: Yohsuke Murase; Mitsuaki Shiga
- Captain: Yusuke Inaba

FINA ranking (since 2008)
- Current: 9 (as of 9 August 2021)
- Highest: 8 (2016, 2017, 2018)

Olympic Games (team statistics)
- Appearances: 10 (first in 1932)
- Best result: 4th place (1932)

World Championship
- Appearances: 12 (first in 2001)
- Best result: 9th place (2022, 2025)

World Cup
- Appearances: 2 (first in 2018)
- Best result: 7th place (2018)

World League
- Appearances: 15 (first in 2006)
- Best result: 4th place (2018)

Asian Games
- Appearances: 17 (first in 1954)
- Best result: (gold) (1958, 1962, 1966, 1970, 2023)

Asian Swimming Championships
- Best result: (gold) (2016)

Asian Water Polo Championship
- Best result: (gold) (2015)

Media
- Website: swim.or.jp

The Japan men's national water polo team is the representative for Japan in international men's water polo.

== Results ==
=== Olympic Games ===
- 1932 – 4th place
- 1936 – 14th place
- 1960 – 14th place
- 1964 – 11th place
- 1968 – 12th place
- 1972 – 15th place
- 1984 – 11th place
- 2016 – 12th place
- 2020 – 10th place
- 2024 – 11th place

=== World Championship ===
- 2001 – 16th place
- 2003 – 15th place
- 2005 – 14th place
- 2007 – 16th place
- 2011 – 11th place
- 2015 – 13th place
- 2017 – 10th place
- 2019 – 11th place
- 2022 – 9th place
- 2023 – 11th place
- 2024 – 13th place
- 2025 – 9th place

=== World Cup ===
- 2018 – 7th place
- 2025 – 8th place

=== World League ===
- 2006 – 15th place
- 2007 – 16th place
- 2008 – 11th place
- 2009 – 7th place
- 2010 – 11th place
- 2011 – 10th place
- 2012 – 11th place
- 2013 – 7th place
- 2014 – Intercontinental Preliminary round
- 2015 – Intercontinental Preliminary round
- 2016 – 6th place
- 2017 – 8th place
- 2018 – 4th place
- 2019 – 6th place
- 2020 – 5th place

=== Asian Games ===
- 1954 – (silver) Silver medal
- 1958 – (gold) Gold medal
- 1962 – (gold) Gold medal
- 1966 – (gold) Gold medal
- 1970 – (gold) Gold medal
- 1974 – (bronze) Silver medal
- 1978 – (silver) Silver medal
- 1982 – (silver) Silver medal
- 1990 – (silver) Silver medal
- 1994 – (bronze) Silver medal
- 1998 – 4th
- 2002 – (silver) Silver medal
- 2006 – (silver) Silver medal
- 2010 – (bronze) Silver medal
- 2014 – (silver) Silver medal
- 2018 – (silver) Silver medal
- 2023 – (gold) Gold medal

=== Asian Swimming Championships ===
- 2012 – (bronze) Silver medal
- 2016 – (gold) Gold medal

=== Asian Water Polo Championship ===
- 2009 – (bronze) Bronze medal
- 2012 – (bronze) Bronze medal
- 2015 – (gold) Gold medal

== Current squad ==
Roster for the 2025 World Championships.

Head coach: Yoshinori Shiota

- 1 Towa Nishimura GK
- 2 Seiya Adachi FP
- 3 Taiyo Watanabe FP
- 4 Toshiyuki Maeda FP
- 5 Enishi Ura FP
- 6 Toi Suzuki FP
- 7 Kiyomu Date FP
- 8 Mitsuru Takata FP
- 9 Ikkei Nitta FP
- 10 Yusuke Inaba FP
- 11 Daichi Ogihara FP
- 12 Kenta Araki FP
- 13 Ren Sasano GK
- 14 Jun Lowrey FP
- 15 Yuki Moriya FP

== See also ==
- Japan men's Olympic water polo team records and statistics
