= Takashi Yokoyama =

Takashi Yokoyama may refer to:

- Takashi Yokoyama (swimmer) (横山 隆志, 1913–1945), Japanese swimmer
- Takashi Yokoyama (water polo) (横山 隆, born 1940), Japanese water polo player
