= China men's national water polo team =

Men's national water polo team representing China

China
- FINA code: CHN
- Confederation: AASF (Asia)
- Head coach: Ivan Asič; Chen Weihan
- Asst coach: Marin Kliškinjić; Zhu Junyi
- Captain: Chen Zhongxian

FINA ranking (since 2008)
- Highest: 7 (2010)

Olympic Games
- Appearances: 3 (first in 1984)
- Best result: 9th place (1984)

World Championship
- Appearances: 12 (first in 1982)
- Best result: 10th place (1982)

World Cup
- Appearances: 1 (first in 2010)
- Best result: 7th place (2010)

World League
- Appearances: 11 (first in 2005)
- Best result: 6th place (2012, 2013)

Asian Games
- Appearances: 12 (first in 1974)
- Best result: (gold) (1978, 1982, 1986, 1990, 2006)

Asian Swimming Championships
- Best result: (gold) (2012)

Asian Water Polo Championship
- Best result: (gold) (2009)

Asian Cup
- Appearances: 2 (first in 2010)
- Best result: (gold) (2010)

The China men's national water polo team represents China in international water polo competitions and friendly matches. It is one of the leading teams in Asia.

== Results ==
=== Olympic Games ===
- 1984 – 9th place
- 1988 – 11th place
- 2008 – 12th place

=== World Championship ===
- 1982 – 10th place
- 1991 – 14th place
- 2003 – 16th place
- 2005 – 16th place
- 2007 – 13th place
- 2009 – 12th place
- 2011 – 15th place
- 2013 – 14th place
- 2015 – 15th place
- 2023 – 15th place
- 2024 – 12th place
- 2025 – 14th place

=== World Cup ===
- 2010 – 7th place

=== World League ===
- 2005 – 13th place
- 2006 – 8th place
- 2007 – 8th place
- 2008 – 9th place
- 2010 – 7th place
- 2011 – 8th place
- 2012 – 6th place
- 2013 – 6th place
- 2014 – 8th place
- 2015 – 8th place
- 2016 – 8th place

=== Asian Games ===
- 1974 – (silver) Silver medal
- 1978 – (gold) Gold medal
- 1982 – (gold) Gold medal
- 1986 – (gold) Gold medal
- 1990 – (gold) Gold medal
- 1994 – (silver) Silver medal
- 1998 – (bronze) Bronze medal
- 2002 – (bronze) Bronze medal
- 2006 – (gold) Gold medal
- 2010 – (silver) Silver medal
- 2014 – (bronze) Bronze medal
- 2018 – 4th place
- 2022 – (silver) Silver medal

=== Asian Swimming Championships ===
- 2012 – (gold) Gold medal
- 2016 – (bronze) Bronze medal

=== Asian Water Polo Championship ===
- 2009 – (gold) Gold medal
- 2012 – (silver) Silver medal
- 2015 – (silver) Silver medal

=== Asian Cup ===
- 2010 – (gold) Gold medal
- 2013 – 4th place

== Current squad ==
Roster for the 2025 World Championships.

Head coach: Ivan Asič/Chen Weihan

- 1 Wu Honghui GK
- 2 Liu Yu FP
- 3 Li Deming FP
- 4 Peng Jiahao FP
- 5 Cai Yuhao FP
- 6 Xie Zekai FP
- 7 Chen Zhongxian FP
- 8 Chen Rui FP
- 9 Chen Yimin FP
- 10 Zhu Jiashao FP
- 11 Wen Zijun FP
- 12 Shen Dingsong FP
- 13 Wu Yongxiang GK
- 14 Wang Beiyi FP
- 15 Liu Zhilong FP

== See also ==
- China women's national water polo team
