= Yang Yong =

Yang Yong is the name of:

- Yang Yong (Sui dynasty) (died 604), Sui dynasty prince
- Yang Yong (general) (1913–1983), People's Liberation Army general and Governor of Guizhou
- Yang Yong (water polo) (born 1963), Chinese water polo player

== See also ==
- Yangyong, a town in Lintan County, Gansu, China
