= Water polo at the 2017 Islamic Solidarity Games =

- Venue: Baku Water Polo Arena
- Dates: 13–17 May 2017

Medalists
gold medal	Turkey
silver medal	Iran
bronze medal	Saudi Arabia

Water polo at the 2017 Islamic Solidarity Games was held from 13 to 17 May 2017 at the Water Polo Arena in Baku, Azerbaijan.

== Medalists ==
Event	Gold	Silver	Bronze
Men	Turkey; Berk Gezek; Berk Alkan; Oğuz Berke Senemoğlu; Atamer Albayrak; Berk Bıyık; Osman Selim Gülenç; Tugay Ergin; Eray Turan; Nadir Sönmez; Neşfet Toğkan Özbek; Ali Can Yılmaz; Sertan Geçtan; Ali Özcan Kılıç	Iran; Omid Lotfpour; Peyman Asadi; Amir Hossein Rahbar; Hamed Malek-Khanbanan; Amir Hossein Keyhani; Ali Pirouzkhah; Amir Dehdari; Hossein Khaledi; Soheil Rostamian; Amin Ghavidel; Arshia Almasi; Mohammad Javad Abbasi; Shayan Ghasemi	Saudi Arabia; Hussain Jazani; Yasser Al-Zahrani; Mohammed Gahal; Malik Mokhtar; Yunes Al-Muraihel; Naif Al-Muntashiri; Hassan Kalfoot; Khaled Al-Harbi; Hattan Al-Olayan; Bader Al-Dughather; Mohammed Al-Khawfi; Mohammed Al-Hilal; Omar Sharahili

== Results ==
Rank	Team	Pld	W	D	L	GF	GA	GD	Pts
1st place, gold medalist(s)	Turkey	4	3	1	0	64	20	+44	10
2nd place, silver medalist(s)	Iran	4	3	1	0	51	32	+19	10
3rd place, bronze medalist(s)	Saudi Arabia	4	2	0	2	34	40	−6	6
4	Azerbaijan	4	1	0	3	28	52	−24	3
5	Indonesia	4	0	0	4	24	57	−33	0

13 May; 16:30	Turkey	21–4	Indonesia	Water Polo Arena, Baku; Referees: Voevodin (RUS), Rezvani (IRI)
13 May; 16:30	Score by quarters: 5–1, 7–2, 5–0, 4–1			Water Polo Arena, Baku; Referees: Voevodin (RUS), Rezvani (IRI)
13 May; 16:30	Albayrak 4	Goals	Harahap 2	Water Polo Arena, Baku; Referees: Voevodin (RUS), Rezvani (IRI)

13 May; 18:00	Azerbaijan	10–16	Iran	Water Polo Arena, Baku; Referees: Rovida (ITA), Süngü (TUR)
13 May; 18:00	Score by quarters: 5–4, 1–3, 2–4, 2–5			Water Polo Arena, Baku; Referees: Rovida (ITA), Süngü (TUR)
13 May; 18:00	Mammadov, Kuznetsov 4	Goals	Keyhani 4	Water Polo Arena, Baku; Referees: Rovida (ITA), Süngü (TUR)

14 May; 16:30	Saudi Arabia	6–11	Iran	Water Polo Arena, Baku; Referees: Süngü (TUR), Rovida (ITA)
14 May; 16:30	Score by quarters: 1–5, 2–3, 2–3, 1–0			Water Polo Arena, Baku; Referees: Süngü (TUR), Rovida (ITA)
14 May; 16:30	Al-Hilal 2	Goals	Rostamian 3	Water Polo Arena, Baku; Referees: Süngü (TUR), Rovida (ITA)

14 May; 18:00	Indonesia	7–9	Azerbaijan	Water Polo Arena, Baku; Referees: Willis (RSA), Al-Mualem (KSA)
14 May; 18:00	Score by quarters: 1–1, 1–2, 1–4, 4–2			Water Polo Arena, Baku; Referees: Willis (RSA), Al-Mualem (KSA)
14 May; 18:00	Harahap 4	Goals	Kuznetsov 3	Water Polo Arena, Baku; Referees: Willis (RSA), Al-Mualem (KSA)

15 May; 16:30	Saudi Arabia	12–6	Indonesia	Water Polo Arena, Baku; Referees: Willis (RSA), Medjidov (AZE)
15 May; 16:30	Score by quarters: 1–2, 3–1, 5–2, 3–1			Water Polo Arena, Baku; Referees: Willis (RSA), Medjidov (AZE)
15 May; 16:30	Al-Dughather 5	Goals	Harahap 4	Water Polo Arena, Baku; Referees: Willis (RSA), Medjidov (AZE)

15 May; 18:00	Azerbaijan	2–18	Turkey	Water Polo Arena, Baku; Referees: Voevodin (RUS), Rezvani (IRI)
15 May; 18:00	Score by quarters: 0–4, 0–6, 1–7, 1–1			Water Polo Arena, Baku; Referees: Voevodin (RUS), Rezvani (IRI)
15 May; 18:00	Marković, E. Ibrahimov 1	Goals	Bıyık 4	Water Polo Arena, Baku; Referees: Voevodin (RUS), Rezvani (IRI)

16 May; 16:30	Indonesia	7–15	Iran	Water Polo Arena, Baku; Referees: Al-Mualem (KSA), Süngü (TUR)
16 May; 16:30	Score by quarters: 3–5, 1–2, 1–3, 2–5			Water Polo Arena, Baku; Referees: Al-Mualem (KSA), Süngü (TUR)
16 May; 16:30	Harahap 3	Goals	Malek-Khanbanan, Almasi, Abbasi 3	Water Polo Arena, Baku; Referees: Al-Mualem (KSA), Süngü (TUR)

16 May; 18:30	Turkey	16–5	Saudi Arabia	Water Polo Arena, Baku; Referees: Rovida (ITA), Rezvani (IRI)
16 May; 18:30	Score by quarters: 4–0, 4–2, 3–2, 5–1			Water Polo Arena, Baku; Referees: Rovida (ITA), Rezvani (IRI)
16 May; 18:30	Albayrak, Özbek 4	Goals	Al-Harbi 2	Water Polo Arena, Baku; Referees: Rovida (ITA), Rezvani (IRI)

17 May; 16:30	Iran	9–9	Turkey	Water Polo Arena, Baku; Referees: Rovida (ITA), Willis (RSA)
17 May; 16:30	Score by quarters: 2–3, 2–3, 2–1, 3–2			Water Polo Arena, Baku; Referees: Rovida (ITA), Willis (RSA)
17 May; 16:30	Malek-Khanbanan 5	Goals	Senemoğlu 3	Water Polo Arena, Baku; Referees: Rovida (ITA), Willis (RSA)

17 May; 18:00	Azerbaijan	7–11	Saudi Arabia	Water Polo Arena, Baku; Referees: Süngü (TUR), Voevodin (RUS)
17 May; 18:00	Score by quarters: 2–3, 1–1, 3–3, 1–4			Water Polo Arena, Baku; Referees: Süngü (TUR), Voevodin (RUS)
17 May; 18:00	Ismaylov, Kuznetsov 2	Goals	Al-Dughather 5	Water Polo Arena, Baku; Referees: Süngü (TUR), Voevodin (RUS)
