= Water polo at the 2013 SEA Games =

Water polo competition

Water polo at the SEA Games

Medalists
gold medal	Singapore
silver medal	Indonesia
bronze medal	Thailand

Water polo at the 2013 SEA Games took place at Zayyarthiri Sports Complex, Naypyidaw, Myanmar between December 6–10.

This competition was organized only for men's water polo teams because the attire of female water polo players was not appropriate according to Burmese female athletes' traditions.

== Medalists ==
=== Result ===
Event	Gold	Silver	Bronze
Men	Singapore (SIN); Sin Chao Nigel Tay; Diyang Lin; Zhi Zhi Loh; Zhen Wei Eugene Teo (C); Yao Xiang Lim; Jwee Ann Paul Louis Tan; Kunyang Chiam; Samuel Moses Nan Feng Yu; Zhi Hong Toh; Wei Ming Sean Ang; Yang Yip; Jian Ying Koh; Ruisheng Byron Quek	Indonesia (INA); Zuliansyah; Beby Willy Eka Paksi Tarigan; Delvin Felliciano; Sylvester Goldberg Manik; Andi Muhammad Uwayzulqarni; Benny Respati; Soederman Prayogo; Rezza Auditya Putra (C); Brandley Ignatius Legawa; Ridjkie Mulia; Zaenal Arifin; Novendra Deni; Novian Dwi Putra	Thailand (THA); Naruedon Niwasakul; Pinit Chaisombat; Pattanit Chompoosang; Methat Srisabai; Patipol Phandphoung (C); Ronnakrit Jarananon; Meathus Chetamee; Kanawat Wattanarungruang; Natthaphon Sangworatham; Sornthum Wongpairoj; Terdtong Klinubol; Thanayut Kingsakul; Wanjak Suwanchart

=== Medal table ===
Rank	Nation	Gold	Silver	Bronze	Total
1	Singapore	1	0	0	1
2	Indonesia	0	1	0	1
3	Thailand	0	0	1	1
Totals (3 entries)		1	1	1	3

== Men's tournament ==
All times are Myanmar Standard Time (UTC+06:30)

Team	GP	W	D	L	GF	GA	GD	Pts
Singapore	4	4	0	0	55	30	+25	8
Indonesia	4	3	0	1	63	18	+45	6
Thailand	4	2	0	2	43	26	17	4
Malaysia	4	1	0	3	40	54	−14	2
Myanmar	4	0	0	4	28	101	−73	0

6 December 2013; 16:00	Myanmar	3–22	Thailand	Zayar Thiri Swimming Pool, Naypyidaw; Referees: Nikolaos Stavropoulos (GRE), Chee Giap Wee (MAS)
6 December 2013; 16:00	Score by quarters: 1–4, 0–4, 0–8, 2–6			Zayar Thiri Swimming Pool, Naypyidaw; Referees: Nikolaos Stavropoulos (GRE), Chee Giap Wee (MAS)

6 December 2013; 18:00	Singapore	18–7	Malaysia	Zayar Thiri Swimming Pool, Naypyidaw; Referees: Nikolaos Stavropoulos (GRE), Gandes Pranolo (INA)
6 December 2013; 18:00	Score by quarters: 3–1, 6–2, 5–0, 4–4			Zayar Thiri Swimming Pool, Naypyidaw; Referees: Nikolaos Stavropoulos (GRE), Gandes Pranolo (INA)

7 December 2013; 10:00	Thailand	9–3	Malaysia	Zayar Thiri Swimming Pool, Naypyidaw; Referees: Nikolaos Stavropoulos (GRE), Jeremy Cheng (SIN)
7 December 2013; 10:00	Score by quarters: 2–0, 4–1, 2–2, 1–0			Zayar Thiri Swimming Pool, Naypyidaw; Referees: Nikolaos Stavropoulos (GRE), Jeremy Cheng (SIN)

7 December 2013; 12:00	Myanmar	1–30	Indonesia	Zayar Thiri Swimming Pool, Naypyidaw; Referees: Pinate Rerkasame (THA), Chee Giap Wee (MAS)
7 December 2013; 12:00	Score by quarters: 0–13, 1–8, 0–8, 0–1			Zayar Thiri Swimming Pool, Naypyidaw; Referees: Pinate Rerkasame (THA), Chee Giap Wee (MAS)

8 December 2013; 10:00	Malaysia	2–16	Indonesia	Zayar Thiri Swimming Pool, Naypyidaw; Referees: Nikolaos Stavropoulos (GRE), Jeremy Cheng (SIN)
8 December 2013; 10:00	Score by quarters: 1–3, 0–6, 0–2, 1–5			Zayar Thiri Swimming Pool, Naypyidaw; Referees: Nikolaos Stavropoulos (GRE), Jeremy Cheng (SIN)

8 December 2013; 12:00	Thailand	5–8	Singapore	Zayar Thiri Swimming Pool, Naypyidaw; Referees: Nikolaos Stavropoulos (GRE), Gandes Pranolo (INA)
8 December 2013; 12:00	Score by quarters: 1–1, 1–2, 3–3, 0–2			Zayar Thiri Swimming Pool, Naypyidaw; Referees: Nikolaos Stavropoulos (GRE), Gandes Pranolo (INA)

9 December 2013; 10:00	Indonesia	5–8	Singapore	Zayar Thiri Swimming Pool, Naypyidaw; Referees: Chee Giap Wee (MAS), Nikolaos Stavropoulos (GRE)
9 December 2013; 10:00	Score by quarters: 1–2, 2–2, 1–1, 1–3			Zayar Thiri Swimming Pool, Naypyidaw; Referees: Chee Giap Wee (MAS), Nikolaos Stavropoulos (GRE)

9 December 2013; 12:00	Malaysia	28–11	Myanmar	Zayar Thiri Swimming Pool, Naypyidaw; Referees: Pinate Rerkasame (THA), Jeremy Cheng (SIN)
9 December 2013; 12:00	Score by quarters: 10–2, 4–3, 9–2, 5–2			Zayar Thiri Swimming Pool, Naypyidaw; Referees: Pinate Rerkasame (THA), Jeremy Cheng (SIN)

10 December 2013; 10:00	Indonesia	12–7	Thailand	Zayar Thiri Swimming Pool, Naypyidaw; Referees: Nikolaos Stavropoulos (GRE), Jeremy Cheng (SIN)
10 December 2013; 10:00	Score by quarters: 1–2, 4–2, 3–1, 4–2			Zayar Thiri Swimming Pool, Naypyidaw; Referees: Nikolaos Stavropoulos (GRE), Jeremy Cheng (SIN)

10 December 2013; 12:00	Singapore	21–13	Myanmar	Zayar Thiri Swimming Pool, Naypyidaw; Referees: Chee Giap Wee (MAS), Pinate Rerkasame (THA)
10 December 2013; 12:00	Score by quarters: 2–0, 5–5, 6–3, 8–5			Zayar Thiri Swimming Pool, Naypyidaw; Referees: Chee Giap Wee (MAS), Pinate Rerkasame (THA)
