= AASF =

AASF may refer to:

- RAF Advanced Air Striking Force
- Asian Amateur Swimming Federation
- Army Aviation Support Facility
