= Sirous Taherian =

Iranian water polo player

Personal information
- Born: August 20, 1965 (age 59)

Sport
- Sport: Water polo

Sirous Taherian سیروس طاهریان (born 20 August 1965) is an Iranian player and coach of water polo. He is a goalkeeper who played in 1990, 1994, and 1998 and won at Asian Games. As a coach, he won in the 2015 FINA World Water Polo Development Trophy. He is now a technical staff director of the Iran national water polo team.
