= 2015 Asian Water Polo Championship =

International water polo competition

- Host city: Foshan, China
- Dates: 16-20 December 2015

The 2015 Asian Water Polo Championship was held from 16 to 20 December 2015 in Foshan, China. It was the Asian continental qualification for the 2016 Olympic water polo tournament.

The draw was held on 21 November 2015 at 12:00. A men's and a women's tournament was held, with the winner qualifying directly for the 2016 Summer Olympics in Rio de Janeiro, Brazil.

== Men's tournament ==
Pos	Team	Pld	W	D	L	GF	GA	GD	Pts
1	Japan	4	4	0	0	79	21	+58	8
2	China	4	3	0	1	57	31	+26	6
3	Kazakhstan	4	2	0	2	61	32	+29	4
4	Iran	4	1	0	3	36	70	−34	2
5	Saudi Arabia	4	0	0	4	14	93	−79	0

Source: JASF

16 December; 18:15	Japan	23–2	Iran	Century Lotus Stadium, Foshan
16 December; 18:15	Score by quarters: 8–0, 6–1, 4–1, 5–0			Century Lotus Stadium, Foshan

16 December; 19:35	China	18–1	Saudi Arabia	Century Lotus Stadium, Foshan

17 December; 18:15	Iran	18–9	Saudi Arabia	Century Lotus Stadium, Foshan

17 December; 19:35	Japan	9–8	Kazakhstan	Century Lotus Stadium, Foshan
17 December; 19:35	Score by quarters: 4–1, 2–3, 1–2, 2–2			Century Lotus Stadium, Foshan

18 December; 18:15	Saudi Arabia	3–26	Kazakhstan	Century Lotus Stadium, Foshan

18 December; 19:35	Iran	6–19	China	Century Lotus Stadium, Foshan

19 December; 17:30	Saudi Arabia	1–31	Japan	Century Lotus Stadium, Foshan
19 December; 17:30	Score by quarters: 0–8, 0–4, 0–9, 1–10			Century Lotus Stadium, Foshan

19 December; 18:50	Kazakhstan	8–10	China	Century Lotus Stadium, Foshan
19 December; 18:50	Score by quarters: 1–2, 2–2, 1–3, 4–3			Century Lotus Stadium, Foshan

20 December; 17:30	Kazakhstan	19–10	Iran	Century Lotus Stadium, Foshan

20 December; 18:50	China	10–16	Japan	Century Lotus Stadium, Foshan
20 December; 18:50	Score by quarters: 2–6, 4–2, 1–3, 3–5			Century Lotus Stadium, Foshan

== Women's tournament ==
Pos	Team	Pld	W	D	L	GF	GA	GD	Pts
1	China	2	2	0	0	23	14	+9	4
2	Japan	2	0	0	2	14	23	−9	0

Source: JASF

16 December; 16:30	Japan	8–14	China	Century Lotus Stadium, Foshan
16 December; 16:30	Score by quarters: 2–4, 1–3, 3–2, 2–5			Century Lotus Stadium, Foshan

17 December; 16:30	China	9–6	Japan	Century Lotus Stadium, Foshan
17 December; 16:30	Score by quarters: 4–3, 2–0, 2–2, 1–1			Century Lotus Stadium, Foshan
