= Water polo at the 1978 Asian Games =

- Venue: Kasetsart University
- Dates: 12–17 December 1978
- Nations: 7

Water polo was contested for men only at the 1978 Asian Games in Kasetsart University, Bangkok, Thailand from 12 December 1978 to 17 December 1978.

Seven countries participated in the men's competition, China won the gold medal in the round robin competition, Japan and Singapore finished second and third behind China.

== Medalists ==
Event	Gold	Silver	Bronze
Men	China; Cai Shengliu; Cai Tianxiong; Li Jianming; Liao Yiping; Lu Zhouqian; Peng Bailing; Qu Baowei; Wang Jianguang; Wang Xiaotian; Xu Lisan; Zhang Huaguang	Japan; Akira Hara; Hiroshi Hasegawa; Kouji Hasegawa; Tadashi Kotani; Kunihiro Makihashi; Mamaru Matani; Masahiro Miyahara; Toshiyuki Miyahara; Masayuki Nagano; Hisao Oyamatsu; Kazuo Urushibara	Singapore; Ang Ban Gee; Ang Ban Leong; Ang Guan Hin; Stephen Chong; Gan Ai Teck; Kenneth Kee; Michael Kong; Lionel Liew; Soh Seng Thit; Teo Keng Soon; Teo Ming Chun

== Results ==
Pos	Team	Pld	W	D	L	GF	GA	GD	Pts
1	China	6	6	0	0	107	11	+96	12
2	Japan	6	5	0	1	71	17	+54	10
3	Singapore	6	4	0	2	53	29	+24	8
4	North Korea	6	3	0	3	39	31	+8	6
5	Thailand	6	2	0	4	24	75	−51	4
6	Kuwait	6	1	0	5	20	83	−63	2
7	Hong Kong	6	0	0	6	13	81	−68	0

Source: Results

12 December	Singapore	9–4	North Korea	Kasetsart University, Bangkok

12 December	Kuwait	9–5	Hong Kong	Kasetsart University, Bangkok

13 December	Japan	17–0	Hong Kong	Kasetsart University, Bangkok

13 December	Kuwait	2–25	China	Kasetsart University, Bangkok

13 December	Thailand	2–14	North Korea	Kasetsart University, Bangkok

14 December	China	12–1	Singapore	Kasetsart University, Bangkok

14 December	Hong Kong	3–8	Thailand	Kasetsart University, Bangkok

14 December	North Korea	0–5	Japan	Kasetsart University, Bangkok

15 December	Kuwait	1–10	North Korea	Kasetsart University, Bangkok

15 December	Thailand	1–21	China	Kasetsart University, Bangkok

15 December	Singapore	13–0	Hong Kong	Kasetsart University, Bangkok

15 December	Thailand	10–6	Kuwait	Kasetsart University, Bangkok

15 December	Hong Kong	1–9	North Korea	Kasetsart University, Bangkok

15 December	Singapore	4–10	Japan	Kasetsart University, Bangkok

16 December	China	13–2	North Korea	Kasetsart University, Bangkok

16 December	Singapore	15–1	Kuwait	Kasetsart University, Bangkok

16 December	Japan	20–1	Thailand	Kasetsart University, Bangkok

17 December	Hong Kong	4–25	China	Kasetsart University, Bangkok

17 December	Japan	18–1	Kuwait	Kasetsart University, Bangkok

17 December	Thailand	2–11	Singapore	Kasetsart University, Bangkok

17 December	Japan	1–11	China	Kasetsart University, Bangkok

== Final standing ==
Rank	Team	Pld	W	D	L
1st place, gold medalist(s)	China	6	6	0	0
2nd place, silver medalist(s)	Japan	6	5	0	1
3rd place, bronze medalist(s)	Singapore	6	4	0	2
4	North Korea	6	3	0	3
5	Thailand	6	2	0	4
6	Kuwait	6	1	0	5
7	Hong Kong	6	0	0	6
