= Water polo at the 2022 Asian Games =

- Venue: Huanglong Swimming Center
- Dates: 25 September – 7 October 2023
- Competitors: 193 from 9 nations

Water polo at the 2022 Asian Games was held at the Huanglong Sports Center, Hangzhou, China from 25 September to 7 October 2023. Nine countries with eight men's teams and seven women's teams participated in the competition.

== Schedule ==
●	Round	●	Last round	P	Preliminary round	¼	Quarterfinals	½	Semifinals	F	Finals

Event↓/Date →	25th Mon	26th Tue	27th Wed	28th Thu	29th Fri	30th Sat	1st Sun	2nd Mon	3rd Tue	4th Wed	5th Thu	6th Fri	7th Sat
Men								P	P	P	¼	½	F
Women	●	●	●	●	●	●	●						

== Medalists ==
Event	Gold	Silver	Bronze
Men	Japan; Katsuyuki Tanamura; Seiya Adachi; Taiyo Watanabe; Daichi Ogihara; Ikkei Nitta; Toi Suzuki; Kiyomu Date; Mitsuru Takata; Atsushi Arai; Yusuke Inaba; Keigo Okawa; Kenta Araki; Towa Nishimura	China; Wu Honghui; Hu Zhangxin; Chu Chenghao; Peng Jiahao; Zhang Jinpeng; Xie Zekai; Chen Zhongxian; Chen Rui; Chen Yimin; Liu Yu; Zhang Chufeng; Tan Feihu; Liang Zhiwei	Kazakhstan; Temirlan Balfanbayev; Eduard Tsoy; Yegor Beloussov; Dušan Marković; Danil Artyukh; Alexey Shmider; Murat Shakenov; Srđan Vuksanović; Rustam Ukumanov; Mikhail Ruday; Ruslan Akhmetov; Sultan Shonzhigitov; Daniil Matolinets
Women	China; Zhang Jiaqi; Yan Siya; Yan Jing; Xiong Dunhan; Zhai Ying; Wang Shiyun; Lu Yiwen; Wang Huan; Deng Zewen; Nong Sanfeng; Chen Xiao; Zhang Jing; Dong Wenxin	Japan; Minami Shioya; Yumi Arima; Akari Inaba; Eruna Ura; Kako Kawaguchi; Hikaru Shitara; Ai Sunabe; Eri Kitamura; Kiyoka Goto; Fuka Nishiyama; Momo Inoue	Kazakhstan; Alexandra Zharkimbayeva; Darya Pochinok; Anastassiya Glukhova; Viktoriya Kaplun; Valeriya Anossova; Madina Rakhmanova; Anna Novikova; Yelizaveta Rudneva; Milena Nabiyeva; Viktoriya Khritankova; Anastassiya Mirshina; Anastassiya Tsoy; Mariya Martynenko

== Medal table ==
Rank	Nation	Gold	Silver	Bronze	Total
1	China (CHN)	1	1	0	2
1	Japan (JPN)	1	1	0	2
3	Kazakhstan (KAZ)	0	0	2	2
Totals (3 entries)		2	2	2	6

== Draw ==
A draw ceremony was held on 14 August 2023 in Muscat, Oman to determine the groups for the men's competition. The women were played in round robin format.

Group A

- South Korea
- Thailand
- China
- Iran

Group B

- Singapore
- Kazakhstan
- Hong Kong
- Japan

== Final standing ==
=== Men ===
Rank	Team	Pld	W	PW	PL	L
1st place, gold medalist(s)	Japan	6	6	0	0	0
2nd place, silver medalist(s)	China	6	4	1	0	1
3rd place, bronze medalist(s)	Kazakhstan	6	3	1	1	1
4	Iran	6	3	0	1	2
5	Singapore	6	3	0	0	3
6	South Korea	6	2	0	0	4
7	Hong Kong	6	0	1	0	5
8	Thailand	6	0	0	1	5

=== Women ===
Rank	Team	Pld	W	PW	PL	L
1st place, gold medalist(s)	China	6	6	0	0	0
2nd place, silver medalist(s)	Japan	6	5	0	0	1
3rd place, bronze medalist(s)	Kazakhstan	6	4	0	0	2
4	Singapore	6	3	0	0	3
5	Thailand	6	2	0	0	4
6	Uzbekistan	6	1	0	0	5
7	South Korea	6	0	0	0	6
