= South Korea men's national water polo team =

Men's national water polo team representing South Korea

South Korea
- FINA code: KOR
- Confederation: AASF (Asia)
- Head coach: Go Ki-mura
- Asst coach: Lee Seung-jae
- Captain: Lee Seon-uk

Olympic Games
- Appearances: 1 (first in 1988)
- Best result: 12th place (1988)

World Championship
- Appearances: 1 (first in 2019)
- Best result: 15th place (2019)

Asian Games
- Appearances: 8 (first in 1986)
- Best result: (1986)

The South Korea men's national water polo team represents South Korea in international men's water polo competitions.

== Results ==
=== Olympic Games ===
- 1988 — 12th place
- 1992 to 2024 - did not qualify

=== World Championships ===
- 2019 — 15th place

=== Asian Games ===
- 1986 – Silver Medal
- 1990 – Bronze Medal
- 1994 – 5th place
- 2002 – 5th place
- 2006 – 7th place
- 2010 – 4th place
- 2014 – 4th place
- 2018 – 5th place
- 2022 – 6th place

== Current roster ==
Roster for the 2019 World Championships.

Head coach: Go Ki-mura

№	Name	Pos.	Height	Weight	L/R	Date of birth	Club
1	Lee Jin-woo	GK				19 March 1997 (age 29)	
2	Kim Dong-hyeok	FP				15 January 1996 (age 30)	
3	Kim Byeong-ju	FP				23 December 1998 (age 27)	
4	Lee Seon-uk (C)	FP				23 November 1987 (age 38)	
5	Gwon Dae-yong	FP				16 December 1995 (age 30)	
6	Lee Seong-gyu	FP				23 November 1997 (age 28)	
7	Gwon Yeong-gyun	FP				19 November 1987 (age 38)	
8	Kim Moon-soo	FP				2 February 1994 (age 32)	
9	Chu Min-jong	FP				6 July 1992 (age 33)	
10	Han Hyo-min	FP				12 September 1998 (age 27)	
11	Seo Kang-won	FP				16 March 1997 (age 29)	
12	Song Jae-hoon	FP				20 January 1996 (age 30)	
13	Jung Byeong-young	GK				2 July 1997 (age 28)	
