= Yoji Omoto =

Japanese water polo coach (born 1967)

Personal information
- Born: June 26, 1967 (age 59) Chiba Prefecture, Japan

Sport
- Sport: Water polo
Medal record
Representing Japan
Asian Games
Silver medal – second place	1990 Beijing	Team competition

Yoji Omoto (大本洋嗣, Ōmoto Yōji; born 26 June 1967) is a Japanese water polo coach. He was the head coach of the Japan men's national water polo team at the 2016 and 2020 Summer Olympics. Omoto has a master's degree in physical education from the Nippon Sport Science University in Japan.
