= Water polo at the 1962 Asian Games =

- Venue: Senayan Swimming Stadium
- Dates: 28 August – 1 September 1962
- Nations: 4

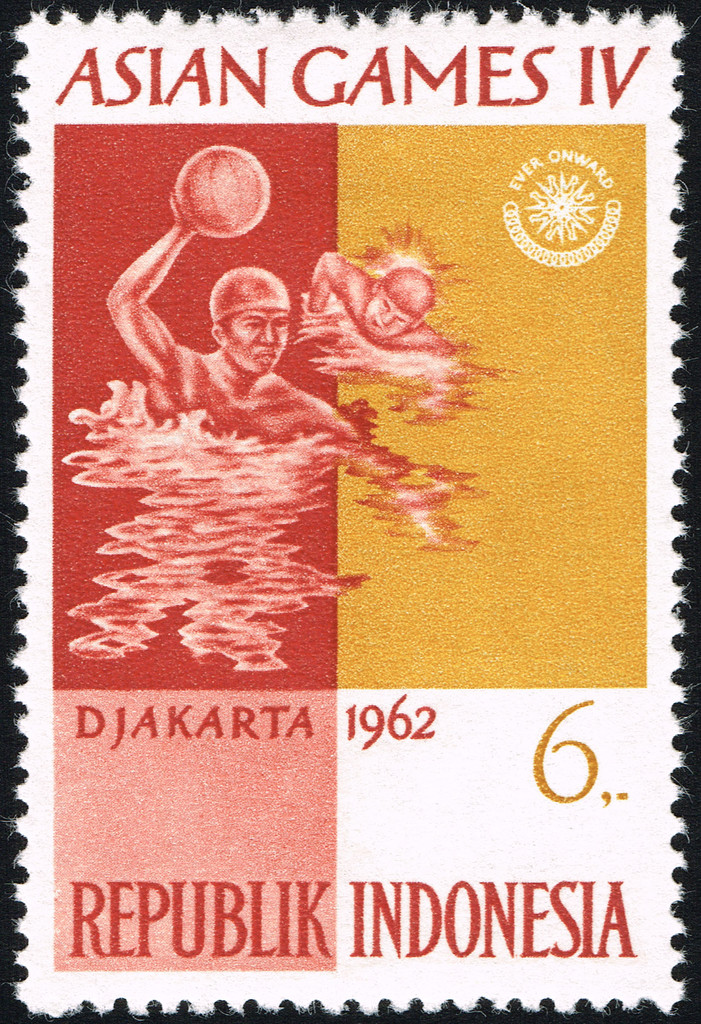
Water polo on a stamp of Indonesia

Water polo was contested only for men at the 1962 Asian Games in Jakarta, Indonesia from 28 August to 1 September 1962 at the Senayan Swimming Stadium.

Japan won the gold medal in round robin competition, Indonesia finished second and Singapore finished on the bronze medal position to complete the podium.

== Medalists ==
Event	Gold	Silver	Bronze
Men	Japan; Hachiro Arakawa; Shigenobu Fujimoto; Norihide Iida; Hiroshi Inoue; Mineo Kato; Yoji Shimizu; Koki Takagi; Kazuya Takeuchi; Toru Takubo; Takashi Yokoyama	Indonesia	Singapore; Lionel Chee; Gan Eng Guan; Gan Eng Teck; Robert Khoo; Lim Teck Pan; Oei Boon Khwee; Pang Tee Ann; Quek Soo Kee; Tan Eng Bock; Thio Gim Hock; Eric Yeo

== Results ==
Pos	Team	Pld	W	D	L	GF	GA	GD	Pts
1	Japan	3	3	0	0	30	4	+26	6
2	Indonesia	3	2	0	1	27	3	+24	4
3	Singapore	3	1	0	2	15	17	−2	2
4	Hong Kong	3	0	0	3	4	52	−48	0

Source: Results

28 August	Indonesia	0–1	Japan	Senayan Swimming Stadium, Jakarta

28 August	Singapore	11–2	Hong Kong	Senayan Swimming Stadium, Jakarta

29 August	Indonesia	6–2	Singapore	Senayan Swimming Stadium, Jakarta

30 August	Japan	9–2	Singapore	Senayan Swimming Stadium, Jakarta

31 August	Indonesia	21–0	Hong Kong	Senayan Swimming Stadium, Jakarta

1 September	Japan	20–2	Hong Kong	Senayan Swimming Stadium, Jakarta

== Final standing ==
Rank	Team	Pld	W	D	L
1st place, gold medalist(s)	Japan	3	3	0	0
2nd place, silver medalist(s)	Indonesia	3	2	0	1
3rd place, bronze medalist(s)	Singapore	3	1	0	2
4	Hong Kong	3	0	0	3
