= Water polo at the 2005 Islamic Solidarity Games =

- Venue: King Abdullah Sport City
- Dates: 14-18 April 2005

Medalists
gold medal	Egypt
silver medal	Kazakhstan
bronze medal	Saudi Arabia

Water polo at the 2005 Islamic Solidarity Games was held in Jeddah, Saudi Arabia from the 14th to 18th of April, 2005. The games were contested in the Swimming Pool of the General Presidency for Youth Welfare at King Abdullah Sports City.

== Medalists ==
Event	Gold	Silver	Bronze
Men	Egypt	Kazakhstan	Saudi Arabia

== Results ==
Rank	Team	Pld	W	D	L	GF	GA	GD	Pts
1st place, gold medalist(s)	Egypt	5	5	0	0				10
2nd place, silver medalist(s)	Kazakhstan	5	4	0	1				8
3rd place, bronze medalist(s)	Saudi Arabia	5	2	1	2	44	30	+14	5
4	Iran	5	2	1	2	35	28	+7	5
5	Kuwait	5	1	0	4				2
6	Azerbaijan	5	0	0	5				0

14 April; 17:00	Egypt	19–1	Azerbaijan	King Abdullah Sport City Swimming Pool, Jeddah

14 April; 19:15	Kazakhstan	5–3	Iran	King Abdullah Sport City Swimming Pool, Jeddah

14 April; 21:00	Kuwait	7–19	Saudi Arabia	King Abdullah Sport City Swimming Pool, Jeddah

15 April; 17:00	Kuwait	5–12	Iran	King Abdullah Sport City Swimming Pool, Jeddah

15 April; 19:15	Azerbaijan	3–10	Kazakhstan	King Abdullah Sport City Swimming Pool, Jeddah

15 April; 21:00	Saudi Arabia	6–7	Egypt	King Abdullah Sport City Swimming Pool, Jeddah

16 April; 17:00	Egypt	–	Kazakhstan	King Abdullah Sport City Swimming Pool, Jeddah

16 April; 19:15	Azerbaijan	–	Kuwait	King Abdullah Sport City Swimming Pool, Jeddah

16 April; 21:00	Saudi Arabia	4–4	Iran	King Abdullah Sport City Swimming Pool, Jeddah

17 April; 17:00	Iran	4–8	Egypt	King Abdullah Sport City Swimming Pool, Jeddah

17 April; 19:15	Kazakhstan	16–8	Kuwait	King Abdullah Sport City Swimming Pool, Jeddah

17 April; 21:00	Azerbaijan	6–10	Saudi Arabia	King Abdullah Sport City Swimming Pool, Jeddah

18 April; 17:00	Egypt	18–8	Kuwait	King Abdullah Sport City Swimming Pool, Jeddah

18 April; 19:15	Iran	12–6	Azerbaijan	King Abdullah Sport City Swimming Pool, Jeddah

18 April; 21:00	Kazakhstan	6–5	Saudi Arabia	King Abdullah Sport City Swimming Pool, Jeddah
