= Zhao Bilong =

Chinese water polo player

Personal information
- Nationality: Chinese
- Born: 1 February 1960 (age 66)

Sport
- Sport: Water polo
Medal record
Men's water polo
Representing China
Asian Games
Gold medal – first place	1982 Delhi	Team competition
Gold medal – first place	1986 Seoul	Team competition
Silver medal – second place	1994 Hiroshima	Team competition

Zhao Bilong (born 1 February 1960) is a Chinese water polo player. He competed at the 1984 Summer Olympics and the 1988 Summer Olympics.
