= Yoji Shimizu =

Japanese water polo player

Personal information
- Nationality: Japanese
- Born: 26 January 1941 (age 85) Tokyo, Japan

Sport
- Sport: Water polo
Medal record
Representing Japan
Asian Games
Gold medal – first place	1962 Jakarta	Men's tournament
Gold medal – first place	1966 Bangkok	Men's tournament

Yoji Shimizu (清水 洋二, Shimizu Yōji; born 26 January 1941) is a Japanese water polo player. He competed at the 1960 Summer Olympics and the 1964 Summer Olympics.
