= Cui Shiping =

Chinese water polo player (born 1963)

Personal information
- Nationality: Chinese
- Born: 18 June 1963 (age 63)

Sport
- Sport: Water polo
Medal record
Men's water polo
Representing China
Asian Games
Gold medal – first place	1990 Beijing	Team competition

Cui Shiping (born 18 June 1963) is a Chinese water polo player. He competed in the men's tournament at the 1988 Summer Olympics.
