= Igor Zagoruyko =

Kazakhstani water polo player

Igor Zagoruiko
Personal information
- Full name: Igor Vladimirovich Zagoruiko
- Nationality: Kazakhstan
- Born: 31 May 1971 (age 55) Kentau, Kazakh SSR, Soviet Union
- Height: 1.92 m (6 ft 4 in)
- Weight: 87 kg (192 lb)

Sport
- Sport: Water polo
- Position: driver
- College team: Kazakh Academy of Sport and Tourism

Senior clubs
- Years: Team
- –: Sintez Kazan
- –: Dinamo Alma-Ata
- –: IYIK Istanbul
- –: Penguins London
National team
- Years: Team
- ?-?: Kazakhstan
Medal record
Representing Kazakhstan
Asian Games
Gold medal – first place	1994 Hiroshima	Team competition
Gold medal – first place	1998 Bangkok	Team competition

Igor Vladimirovich Zagoruiko is a Kazakhstan water polo player. He was a member of the Kazakhstan men's national water polo team, playing as a driver. He was a part of the team at the 2000 Summer Olympics and 2004 Summer Olympics. On club level he played for Sintez Kazan in Russia.
