= Ying Tung Natatorium =

Swimming venue in Beijing, China

Coordinates: 39°59′4″N 116°23′45″E

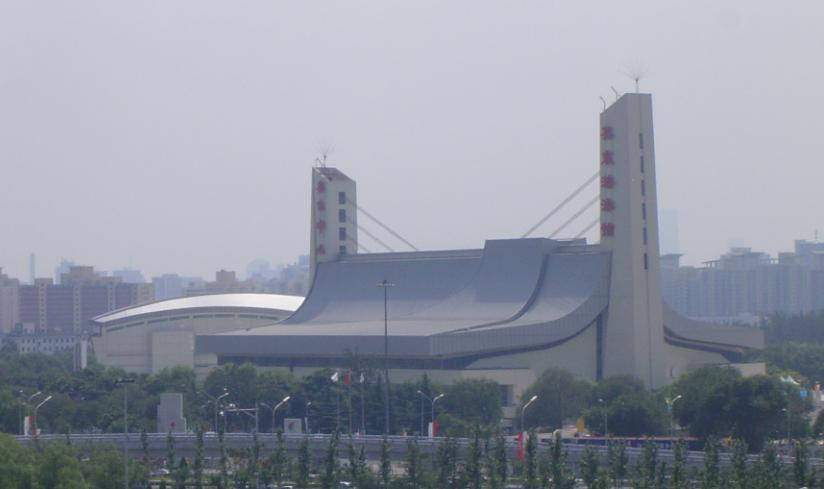
- Interactive map of Ying Tung Natatorium
- Full name: The National Olympic Sports Centre Ying Tung Natatorium
- Address: Beijing

Construction
- Opened: 1990

The Ying Tung Natatorium (simplified Chinese: 英东游泳馆; traditional Chinese: 英東游泳館; pinyin: Yīngdōng Yóuyǒngguǎn) is a swimming venue located in the Olympic Sports Centre in Beijing, China with a seating capacity of 4,852. It was upgraded for the 2008 Summer Olympics and expanded to 44,635 square metres. It hosted Olympic water polo matches and the swimming part of the modern pentathlon event. The renovations were complete by September 10, 2007.

It also served as the main swimming venue in the 1990 Asian Games and in the 2001 Summer Universiade.

It is named after Henry Fok Ying Tung, a businessman who left a large amount of money toward Olympics construction.

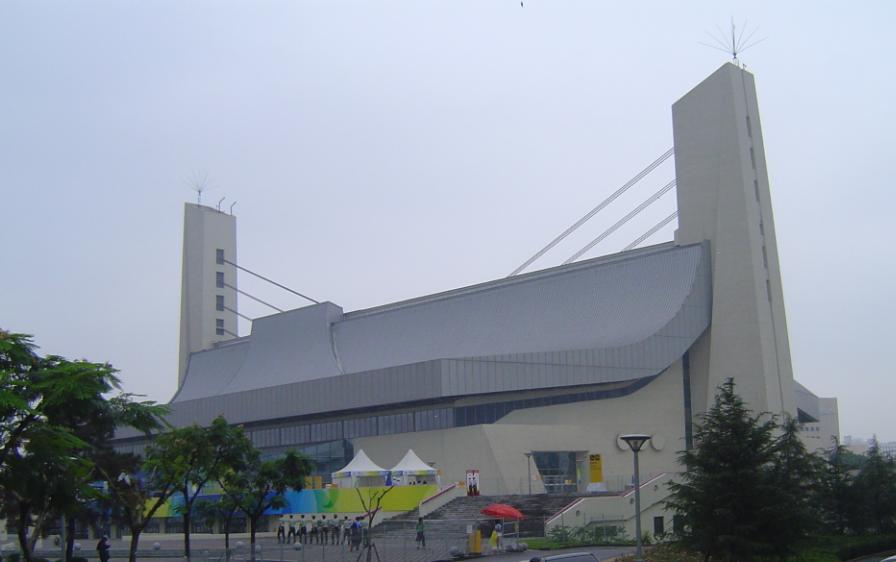
The Yingdong Natatorium

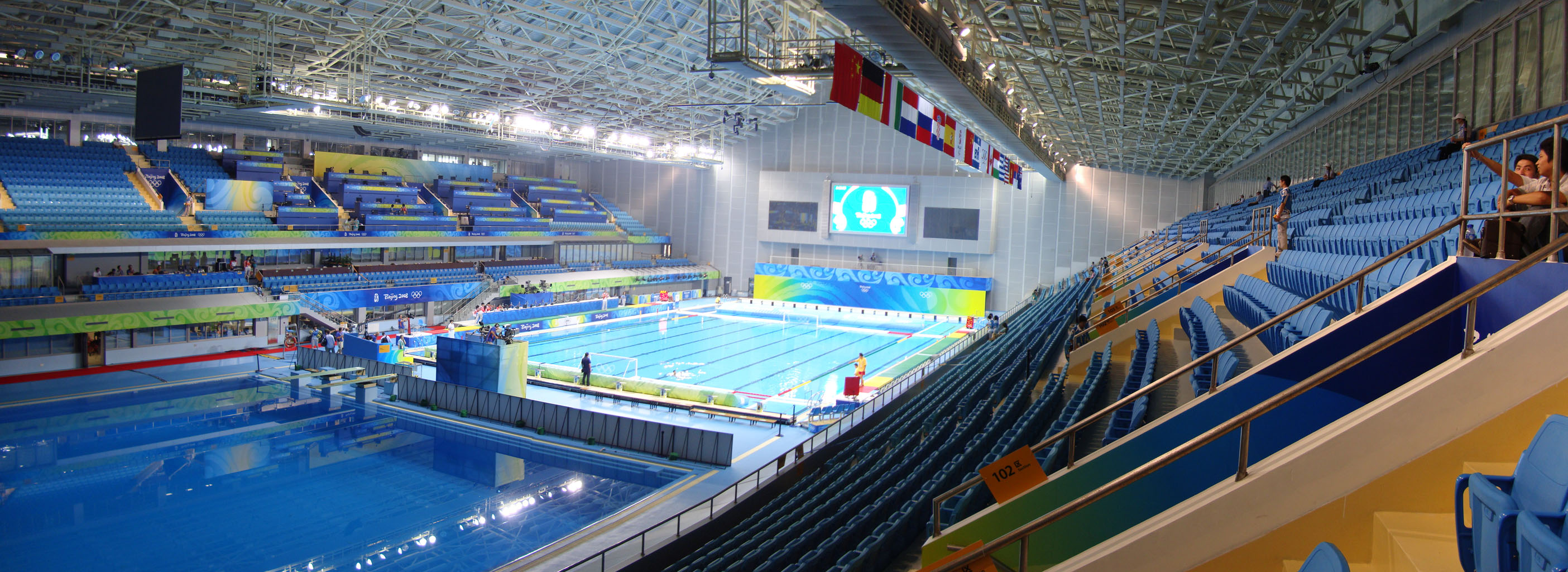
Inside the Yingdong Natatorium
