= Kazuya Takeuchi =

Japanese water polo player

Personal information
- Born: August 29, 1941 (age 84)

Sport
- Sport: Water polo
Medal record
Representing Japan
Asian Games
| Gold medal – first place | 1962 Jakarta | Men's tournament |
| Gold medal – first place | 1966 Bangkok | Men's tournament |

Kazuya Takeuchi (竹内 和也, Takeuchi Kazuya; born 29 August 1941) is a Japanese former water polo player who competed in the 1964 Summer Olympics and in the 1968 Summer Olympics.
