= Koki Takagi =

Japanese water polo player

Personal information
- Nationality: Japanese
- Born: 22 December 1936 (age 89) Kyoto, Japan

Sport
- Sport: Water polo
Medal record
Representing Japan
Asian Games
Gold medal – first place	1958 Tokyo	Men's tournament
Gold medal – first place	1962 Jakarta	Men's tournament

Koki Takagi (高木弘毅, Takagi Kōki; born 22 December 1936) is a Japanese water polo player. He competed at the 1960 Summer Olympics and the 1964 Summer Olympics.
