= Lim Teck Pan =

Singaporean water polo player

Personal information
- Nationality: Singaporean
- Born: 1938
- Died: 1970s

Sport
- Sport: Water polo
Medal record
Representing Singapore
Asian Games
Bronze medal – third place	1962 Jakarta	Men's tournament

Lim Teck Pan (1938 – 1970s) was a Singaporean water polo player. He competed in the men's tournament at the 1956 Summer Olympics.
