= Tan Eng Bock =

Singaporean water polo player (1936–2020)

Personal information
- Nationality: Singaporean
- Born: 29 April 1936
- Died: 30 November 2020 (aged 84) Singapore

Sport
- Sport: Water polo
Medal record
Representing Singapore
Asian Games
Gold medal – first place	1954 Manila	Men's tournament
Silver medal – second place	1958 Tokyo	Men's tournament
Silver medal – second place	1966 Bangkok	Men's tournament
Bronze medal – third place	1962 Jakarta	Men's tournament

Tan Eng Bock (29 April 1936 – 30 November 2020) was a Singaporean water polo player. He competed in the men's tournament at the 1956 Summer Olympics.
