= Song Seung-ho =

South Korean water polo player

Personal information
- Nationality: South Korean
- Born: 24 December 1965 (age 60)

Sport
- Sport: Water polo
Medal record
Representing South Korea
Asian Games
Silver medal – second place	1986 Seoul	Team competition

Song Seung-ho (born 24 December 1965) is a South Korean water polo player. He competed in the men's tournament at the 1988 Summer Olympics.
