= Lee Taek-won =

South Korean water polo player

Personal information
- Nationality: South Korean
- Born: 18 February 1968 (age 58)

Sport
- Sport: Water polo
Medal record
Representing South Korea
Asian Games
Silver medal – second place	1986 Seoul	Team competition

Lee Taek-won (Korean: 이 택원, born 18 February 1968) is a South Korean water polo player. He competed in the men's tournament at the 1988 Summer Olympics.
