= Ni Shiwei =

Chinese water polo player

Personal information
- Nationality: Chinese
- Born: 6 June 1963 (age 63)

Sport
- Sport: Water polo
Medal record
Men's water polo
Representing China
Asian Games
Gold medal – first place	1990 Beijing	Team competition
Silver medal – second place	1994 Hiroshima	Team competition

Ni Shiwei (born 6 June 1963) is a Chinese water polo player. He competed in the men's tournament at the 1988 Summer Olympics.
