= Oh Chwee Hock =

Singaporean water polo player

Personal information
- Nationality: Singaporean
- Born: 23 March 1931 Singapore
- Died: 1996 (aged 64–65) Australia

Sport
- Sport: Water polo
Medal record
Representing Singapore
Asian Games
Gold medal – first place	1954 Manila	Men's tournament

Oh "Christopher" Chwee Hock (1931-1996) was a Singaporean water polo player. He competed in the men's tournament at the 1956 Summer Olympics.
