= Water polo at the 1990 Asian Games =

- Venue: Ying Tung Natatorium
- Dates: 24–30 September 1990
- Nations: 7

Water polo was contested for men only at the 1990 Asian Games in Beijing, China.

== Medalists ==
Event	Gold	Silver	Bronze
Men	China; Cai Shengliu; Cui Shiping; Deng Zhaorong; Ge Jianqing; Gong Dali; Huang Long; Huang Qijiang; Jiang Yihua; Lin Jun; Ni Shiwei; Wang Minhui; Xie Bin; Zheng Yong	Japan; Fumihiro Anzai; Toru Inagaki; Kuniaki Ito; Kunihiko Kobata; Kenichi Matsuo; Makihiro Motomiya; Hiroki Oka; Yoji Omoto; Kenichi Sato; Yushi Takano	South Korea; Ahn Sang-hoon; Chang Si-young; Jeong Bo-keun; Jeong Dong-seob; Jeong Yeong-sik; Kwon Oh-kil; Lee Jung-suk; Lee Sang-hyun; Lee Sang-won; Park Jong-gil; Park Moon-seon; Park Seok-beom; Yoo Seung-hoon

== Results ==
=== Preliminary round ===
==== Group A ====
Pos	Team	Pld	W	D	L	GF	GA	GD	Pts	Qualification
1	China	3	3	0	0	45	12	+33	6	Semifinals
2	South Korea	3	2	0	1	32	23	+9	4	Semifinals
3	Iran	3	1	0	2	27	24	+3	2	Classification 5th–7th
4	Hong Kong	3	0	0	3	11	56	−45	0	Classification 5th–7th

Source: Results

24 September	China	20–5	Hong Kong	Ying Tung Natatorium, Beijing

24 September	South Korea	9–7	Iran	Ying Tung Natatorium, Beijing

26 September	China	12–1	Iran	Ying Tung Natatorium, Beijing

26 September	South Korea	17–3	Hong Kong	Ying Tung Natatorium, Beijing

27 September	China	13–6	South Korea	Ying Tung Natatorium, Beijing

27 September	Iran	19–3	Hong Kong	Ying Tung Natatorium, Beijing

==== Group B ====
Pos	Team	Pld	W	D	L	GF	GA	GD	Pts	Qualification
1	Japan	2	2	0	0	39	14	+25	4	Semifinals
2	Singapore	2	1	0	1	21	31	−10	2	Semifinals
3	North Korea	2	0	0	2	14	29	−15	0	Classification 5th–7th

Source: Results

24 September	Singapore	12–9	North Korea	Ying Tung Natatorium, Beijing

26 September	Japan	17–5	North Korea	Ying Tung Natatorium, Beijing

27 September	Japan	22–9	Singapore	Ying Tung Natatorium, Beijing

=== Classification 5th–7th ===
- The results and the points of the matches between the same teams that were already played during the preliminary round shall be taken into account for the classification round.

Pos	Team	Pld	W	D	L	GF	GA	GD	Pts
1	North Korea	2	1	1	0	33	12	+21	3 (Note: Head-to-head result: PRK 9–9 IRN. Overall goal difference was used as the tiebreaker.)
2	Iran	2	1	1	0	28	12	+16	3
3	Hong Kong	2	0	0	2	6	43	−37	0

Source: Results
Notes:

29 September	North Korea	24–3	Hong Kong	Ying Tung Natatorium, Beijing

30 September	Iran	9–9	North Korea	Ying Tung Natatorium, Beijing

=== Final round ===
Semifinals
29 September
China	17
Singapore	4
29 September
Japan	13
South Korea	7

Final
30 September
China	10
Japan	7
Bronze medal match
30 September
Singapore	8
South Korea	9

==== Semifinals ====
29 September	China	17–4	Singapore	Ying Tung Natatorium, Beijing

29 September	Japan	13–7	South Korea	Ying Tung Natatorium, Beijing

==== Bronze medal match ====
30 September	Singapore	8–9	South Korea	Ying Tung Natatorium, Beijing

==== Final ====
30 September	China	10–7	Japan	Ying Tung Natatorium, Beijing

== Final standing ==
Rank	Team	Pld	W	D	L
1st place, gold medalist(s)	China	5	5	0	0
2nd place, silver medalist(s)	Japan	4	3	0	1
3rd place, bronze medalist(s)	South Korea	5	3	0	2
4	Singapore	4	1	0	3
5	North Korea	4	1	1	2
6	Iran	4	1	1	2
7	Hong Kong	4	0	0	4
