= Wang Xiaotian =

Chinese water polo player

Personal information
- Nationality: Chinese
- Born: 9 February 1955 (age 71)

Sport
- Sport: Water polo
Medal record
Men's water polo
Representing China
Asian Games
Gold medal – first place	1978 Bangkok	Team competition
Gold medal – first place	1982 Delhi	Team competition
Gold medal – first place	1986 Seoul	Team competition

Wang Xiaotian (born 9 February 1955) is a Chinese water polo player. He competed in the men's tournament at the 1984 Summer Olympics.
