= Gan Eng Teck =

Singaporean water polo player

Personal information
- Nationality: Singaporean
- Born: 15 August 1933
- Died: 7 April 2013 (aged 79)

Sport
- Sport: Water polo
Medal record
Representing Singapore
Asian Games
Gold medal – first place	1954 Manila	Men's tournament
Silver medal – second place	1958 Tokyo	Men's tournament
Silver medal – second place	1966 Bangkok	Men's tournament
Bronze medal – third place	1962 Jakarta	Men's tournament

Gan Eng Teck (15 August 1933 – 7 April 2013) was a Singaporean water polo player. He competed in the men's tournament at the 1956 Summer Olympics.
