= Nurlan Mendygaliyev =

Kazakhstani water polo player

Personal information
- Born: 5 April 1961 (age 65) Alma-Ata, Soviet Union

Sport
- Sport: Water polo
Medal record
Representing the Soviet Union
Olympic Games
| Bronze medal – third place | 1988 Seoul | Team competition |
World Championships
| Bronze medal – third place | 1986 Madrid | Team competition |
European Championships
| Gold medal – first place | 1983 Rome | Team competition |
| Gold medal – first place | 1985 Sofia | Team competition |
| Silver medal – second place | 1981 Split | Team competition |
Representing Kazakhstan
Asian Games
| Gold medal – first place | 1994 Hiroshima | Team competition |

Nurlan Mendygaliev (born 5 April 1961) is a Kazakhstani former water polo player who competed in the 1988 Summer Olympics.

== See also ==
- List of Olympic medalists in water polo (men)
- List of world champions in men's water polo
- List of World Aquatics Championships medalists in water polo
