= Li Jianxiong =

Chinese water polo player

Personal information
- Nationality: Chinese
- Born: 10 December 1960 (age 65)

Sport
- Sport: Water polo
Medal record
Men's water polo
Representing China
Asian Games
| Gold medal – first place | 1982 Delhi | Team competition |
| Gold medal – first place | 1986 Seoul | Team competition |

Li Jianxiong (born 10 December 1960) is a Chinese water polo player. He competed in the men's tournament at the 1988 Summer Olympics.
