= Yevgeniy Prokhin =

Kazakhstani water polo player

Personal information
- Nationality: Kazakhstani
- Born: 20 January 1973 (age 53) Alma-Ata, Kazakh SSR, Soviet Union

Sport
- Sport: Water polo
Medal record
Representing Kazakhstan
Asian Games
Gold medal – first place	1994 Hiroshima	Team competition
Gold medal – first place	1998 Bangkok	Team competition

Yevgeniy Prokhin (Евгений Сергеевич Прохин, born 20 January 1973) is a Kazakhstani water polo player. He competed in the men's tournament at the 2000 Summer Olympics.
