= Wang Minhui =

Chinese water polo player

Personal information
- Nationality: Chinese
- Born: 28 October 1960 (age 66)

Sport
- Sport: Water polo
Medal record
Men's water polo
Representing China
Asian Games
Gold medal – first place	1982 Delhi	Team competition
Gold medal – first place	1986 Seoul	Team competition
Gold medal – first place	1990 Beijing	Team competition

Wang Minhui (born 28 October 1960) is a Chinese water polo player. He competed in the men's tournament at the 1988 Summer Olympics.
