= Hachiro Arakawa =

Japanese water polo player

Personal information
- Full name: 荒川 八郎
- Nationality: Japanese
- Born: 8 August 1933 (age 92)

Sport
- Sport: Water polo
Medal record
Representing Japan
Asian Games
Gold medal – first place	1958 Tokyo	Men's tournament
Gold medal – first place	1962 Jakarta	Men's tournament
Silver medal – second place	1954 Manila	Men's tournament

Hachiro Arakawa (荒川 八郎, Arakawa Hachirō; born 8 August 1933) is a Japanese water polo player. He competed in the men's tournament at the 1964 Summer Olympics.
