= Koji Nakano (water polo) =

Japanese water polo player

Personal information
- Born: January 11, 1947 (age 79)

Sport
- Sport: Water polo
Medal record
Representing Japan
Asian Games
Gold medal – first place	1966 Bangkok	Men's tournament
Gold medal – first place	1970 Bangkok	Men's tournament

Koji Nakano (中野 皓司, Nakano Kōji; born 11 January 1947) is a Japanese former water polo player who competed in the 1968 Summer Olympics and in the 1972 Summer Olympics.
