= Thio Gim Hock =

Singaporean water polo player (1938–2020)

Personal information
- Nationality: Singaporean
- Born: 11 March 1938
- Died: 3 April 2020 (aged 82)

Sport
- Sport: Water polo
Medal record
Representing Singapore
Asian Games
Silver medal – second place	1958 Tokyo	Men's tournament
Silver medal – second place	1966 Bangkok	Men's tournament
Bronze medal – third place	1962 Jakarta	Men's tournament

Thio Gim Hock (11 March 1938 – 3 April 2020) was a Singaporean water polo player and real estate tycoon. He competed in the men's tournament at the 1956 Summer Olympics.
