= Danil Artyukh =

Kazakhstani water polo player (born 2003)

Personal information
- Nationality: Kazakhstani
- Born: 2 June 2003 (age 23)

Sport
- Country: Kazakhstan
- Sport: Water polo
Medal record
Representing Kazakhstan
Asian Games
Bronze medal – third place	2022 Hangzhou	Team competition

Danil Artyukh (Данил Артюх, born 2 June 2003) is a Kazakhstani water polo player. He competed in the men's tournament at the 2020 Summer Olympics.
