= Kanji Asanuma =

Japanese water polo player

Personal information
- Nationality: Japanese
- Born: 4 October 1934 (age 91) Kyoto, Japan

Sport
- Sport: Water polo
Medal record
Representing Japan
Asian Games
| Gold medal – first place | 1958 Tokyo | Men's tournament |

Kanji Asanuma (浅沼寛治, Asanuma Kanji; born 4 October 1934) is a Japanese water polo player. He competed in the men's tournament at the 1960 Summer Olympics.
