= Deng Jun =

Chinese water polo player (born 1956)

Personal information
- Nationality: Chinese
- Born: 28 November 1956 (age 69)

Sport
- Sport: Water polo
Medal record
Men's water polo
Representing China
Asian Games
Gold medal – first place	1982 Delhi	Team competition
Gold medal – first place	1986 Seoul	Team competition

Deng Jun (born 28 November 1956) is a Chinese water polo player. He competed in the men's tournament at the 1984 Summer Olympics.
