= Haruo Sato (water polo) =

Japanese water polo player

Personal information
- Born: May 24, 1945 (age 81)

Sport
- Sport: Water polo
Medal record
Representing Japan
Asian Games
| Gold medal – first place | 1966 Bangkok | Men's tournament |

Haruo Sato (佐藤 晴雄, Satō Haruo; born 24 May 1945) is a Japanese former water polo player who competed on the Japanese men's team in the 1968 Summer Olympics. The team did not win a medal.
