= Eric Yeo =

Singaporean water polo player

Personal information
- Nationality: Singaporean
- Born: 17 July 1936
- Died: 15 March 2015 (aged 78) Singapore

Sport
- Sport: Water polo
Medal record
Representing Singapore
Water polo
Asian Games
| Silver medal – second place | 1958 Tokyo | Men's tournament |
| Bronze medal – third place | 1962 Jakarta | Men's tournament |
SEA Games
| Gold medal – first place | 1961 Rangoon | Men's tournament |
| Gold medal – first place | 1965 Kuala Lumpur | Men's tournament |
| Gold medal – first place | 1969 Rangoon | Men's tournament |
| Gold medal – first place | 1971 Kuala Lumpur | Men's tournament |
| Gold medal – first place | 1973 Singapore | Men's tournament |
Swimming
SEA Games
| Bronze medal – third place | 1961 Rangoon | 100m freestyle |

Eric Yeo Oon Tat (17 July 1936 – 15 March 2015) was a Singaporean water polo player and three-time Asian Games medallist. He also became the first Malayan swimmer since 1953 to clock under 60 seconds (58.7secs) for 100m Freestyle Men at the Chinese Swimming Club Championships.

He is most known for competing in the men's tournament at the 1956 Summer Olympics and has been recognised for his efforts to helping the national waterpolo team win a total of five gold medals in the biennial Southeast Asian Peninsular (SEAP) — now known as the Southeast Asian (SEA) Games — from 1965 to 1973.
