= Chang Si-young =

South Korean water polo player

Personal information
- Nationality: South Korean
- Born: 5 May 1968 (age 58)

Sport
- Sport: Water polo
Medal record
Representing South Korea
Asian Games
Bronze medal – third place	1990 Beijing	Men's tournament

Chang Si-young (Korean: 장 시영, born 5 May 1968) is a South Korean water polo player. He competed in the men's tournament at the 1988 Summer Olympics.
