= Lee Jung-suk (water polo) =

South Korean water polo player

Personal information
- Nationality: South Korean
- Born: 18 April 1967 (age 59)

Sport
- Sport: Water polo
Medal record
Representing South Korea
Asian Games
Silver medal – second place	1986 Seoul	Team competition
Bronze medal – third place	1990 Beijing	Team competition

Lee Jung-suk (Korean: 이 정석, born 18 April 1967) is a South Korean water polo player. He competed in the men's tournament at the 1988 Summer Olympics.
