= Makihiro Motomiya =

Japanese water polo coach

Personal information
- Born: December 31, 1968 (age 57)

Sport
- Sport: Water polo
Medal record
Representing Japan
Asian Games
Silver medal – second place	1990 Beijing	Team competition

Makihiro Motomiya (本宮万記弘, Motomiya Makihiro; born 31 December 1968) is a Japanese water polo coach. He was the head coach of the Japan women's national water polo team at the 2020 Summer Olympics.
