= Choi Sun-young =

South Korean water polo player

Personal information
- Nationality: South Korean
- Born: 17 March 1963 (age 63)

Sport
- Sport: Water polo
Medal record
Representing South Korea
Asian Games
Silver medal – second place	1986 Seoul	Men's tournament

Choi Seon-yong (Korean: 최 선용, born 17 March 1963) is a South Korean water polo player. He competed in the men's tournament at the 1988 Summer Olympics.
