= Takanao Sato =

Japanese water polo player

Personal information
- Nationality: Japanese
- Born: 19 January 1933 (age 93) Tokyo, Japan

Sport
- Sport: Water polo
Medal record
Representing Japan
Asian Games
Gold medal – first place	1958 Tokyo	Men's tournament

Takanao Sato (佐藤 孝尚, Satō Takanao; born 19 January 1933) is a Japanese water polo player. He competed in the men's tournament at the 1960 Summer Olympics.
