= Toshiyuki Miyahara =

Japanese water polo player

Personal information
- Born: April 9, 1958 (age 68)

Sport
- Sport: Water polo
Medal record
Representing Japan
Asian Games
Silver medal – second place	1978 Bangkok	Men's tournament
Silver medal – second place	1982 New Delhi	Men's tournament

Toshiyuki Miyahara (宮原 利幸, Miyahara Toshiyuki; born 9 April 1958) is a Japanese former water polo player who competed in the 1984 Summer Olympics.
