= Yoo Seung-hoon =

South Korean water polo player

Personal information
- Nationality: South Korean
- Born: 9 October 1969 (age 57)

Sport
- Sport: Water polo
Medal record
Representing South Korea
Asian Games
Bronze medal – third place	1990 Beijing	Team competition

Yoo Seung-hoon (Korean: 유 승훈, born 9 October 1969) is a South Korean water polo player. He competed in the men's tournament at the 1988 Summer Olympics.
