= Hirokatsu Kuwayama =

Japanese water polo player

Personal information
- Born: July 22, 1942 (age 83)

Sport
- Sport: Water polo
Medal record
Representing Japan
Asian Games
Gold medal – first place	1966 Bangkok	Men's tournament
Gold medal – first place	1970 Bangkok	Men's tournament

Hirokatsu Kuwayama (桑山 博克, Kuwayama Hirokatsu) (born 22 July 1942) is a Japanese former water polo player who competed in the 1968 Summer Olympics and in the 1972 Summer Olympics.
