= Water polo at the 1958 Asian Games =

- Venue: Metropolitan Indoor Swimming Pool
- Dates: 28–31 May 1958
- Nations: 5

Water polo was contested for men only at the 1958 Asian Games in Tokyo, Japan from May 28 to May 31, 1958 at the Metropolitan Indoor Swimming Pool.

The host nation Japan won the gold medal in a round robin competition, Singapore finished second and won the bronze medal while Indonesia finished on third place.

== Schedule ==
●	Round	●	Last round

Event↓/Date →	28th Wed	29th Thu	30th Fri	31st Sat
Men	●	●	●	●

== Medalists ==
Event	Gold	Silver	Bronze
Men	Japan; Hachiro Arakawa; Kanji Asanuma; Toshio Hashimoto; Mineo Kato; Motonobu Miyamura; Hiroshi Ono; Kensuke Sato; Takanao Sato; Masakazu Sawamura; Koki Takagi; Tsutomu Yusa	Singapore; Lionel Chee; Gan Eng Guan; Gan Eng Teck; Andrew Lim; Barry Mitchell; Derek Mitchell; Tan Eng Bock; Tan Eng Liang; Thio Gim Hock; Eric Yeo	Indonesia; Benjamin Idris; Kuswara; Liem Siong Lien; Lim Sing Lok; Lim Sing Poen; Oei Teng Pie; Rudy Oen; Tio Tjoe Hong; Nicolaas Winter

== Results ==
All times are Japan Standard Time (UTC+09:00)

Pos	Team	Pld	W	D	L	GF	GA	GD	Pts
1	Japan	4	4	0	0	51	4	+47	8
2	Singapore	4	3	0	1	46	6	+40	6
3	Indonesia	4	2	0	2	23	19	+4	4
4	Hong Kong	4	1	0	3	9	53	−44	2
5	Philippines	4	0	0	4	4	51	−47	0

Source: Results

28 May; 12:30	Singapore	15–0	Philippines	Metropolitan Indoor Swimming Pool, Tokyo

28 May; 13:30	Hong Kong	0–22	Japan	Metropolitan Indoor Swimming Pool, Tokyo

29 May; 12:00	Indonesia	2–10	Singapore	Metropolitan Indoor Swimming Pool, Tokyo

29 May; 13:00	Philippines	4–8	Hong Kong	Metropolitan Indoor Swimming Pool, Tokyo

29 May; 17:00	Indonesia	2–8	Japan	Metropolitan Indoor Swimming Pool, Tokyo

30 May; 12:00	Philippines	0–17	Japan	Metropolitan Indoor Swimming Pool, Tokyo

30 May; 13:00	Singapore	19–0	Hong Kong	Metropolitan Indoor Swimming Pool, Tokyo

30 May; 17:10	Philippines	0–11	Indonesia	Metropolitan Indoor Swimming Pool, Tokyo

31 May; 12:00	Hong Kong	1–8	Indonesia	Metropolitan Indoor Swimming Pool, Tokyo

31 May; 14:50	Singapore	2–4	Japan	Metropolitan Indoor Swimming Pool, Tokyo

== Final standing ==
Rank	Team	Pld	W	D	L
1st place, gold medalist(s)	Japan	4	4	0	0
2nd place, silver medalist(s)	Singapore	4	3	0	1
3rd place, bronze medalist(s)	Indonesia	4	2	0	2
4	Hong Kong	4	1	0	3
5	Philippines	4	0	0	4
