= Minami Shioya =

Japanese water polo player

Personal information
- Nationality: Japan
- Born: 27 July 1997 (age 28)

Sport
- Sport: Water polo
Medal record
Women's water polo
Representing Japan
Summer Universiade
Bronze medal – third place	2017 Taipei	Team
Asian Games
Silver medal – second place	2022 Hangzhou	Team
Bronze medal – third place	2018 Jakarta	Team

Minami Shioya (塩谷 南美, July 27, 1997) is a Japanese water polo player. She competed in the 2020 Summer Olympics.
