= Motonobu Miyamura =

Japanese water polo player

Personal information
- Nationality: Japanese
- Born: 1 December 1936 (age 89) Kumamoto, Japan

Sport
- Sport: Water polo
Medal record
Representing Japan
Asian Games
| Gold medal – first place | 1958 Tokyo | Men's tournament |

Motonobu Miyamura (宮村元信, Miyamura Motonobu; born 1 December 1936) is a Japanese water polo player. He competed in the men's tournament at the 1960 Summer Olympics.
