= Kim Ki-choon =

South Korean water polo player

Personal information
- Nationality: South Korean
- Born: 8 September 1966 (age 60)

Sport
- Sport: Water polo
Medal record
Representing South Korea
Asian Games
Silver medal – second place	1986 Seoul	Men's tournament

Kim Ki-choon (Korean: 김 기춘, born 8 September 1966) is a South Korean water polo player. He competed in the men's tournament at the 1988 Summer Olympics.
