= Seiya Sakamoto =

Japanese water polo player

Personal information
- Born: October 24, 1944 (age 81)

Sport
- Sport: Water polo
Medal record
Representing Japan
Asian Games
Gold medal – first place	1966 Bangkok	Men's tournament

Seiya Sakamoto (坂本 征也, Sakamoto Seiya; born 24 October 1944) is a Japanese former water polo player who competed in the 1968 Summer Olympics.
