= Ge Jianqing =

Chinese water polo player (born 1965)

Personal information
- Nationality: Chinese
- Born: 22 April 1965 (age 61)

Sport
- Sport: Water polo
Medal record
Men's water polo
Representing China
Asian Games
Gold medal – first place	1986 Seoul	Team competition
Gold medal – first place	1990 Beijing	Team competition

Ge Jianqing (born 22 April 1965) is a Chinese water polo player. He competed in the men's tournament at the 1988 Summer Olympics.
