= Water polo at the 1994 Asian Games =

- Venue: Big Wave Pool
- Dates: 11–15 October 1994
- Nations: 6

Water polo was contested for men only at the 1994 Asian Games at the Hiroshima Big Wave Pool, Hiroshima, Japan from 11 October to 15 October 1994.

Kazakhstan won the gold medal with a perfect record in its debut at the Asian Games, China finished second and Japan won the bronze medal in round robin competition.

== Schedule ==
●	Round	●	Last round

Event↓/Date →	11th Tue	12th Wed	13th Thu	14th Fri	15th Sat
Men	●	●	●	●	●

== Medalists ==
Event	Gold	Silver	Bronze
Men	Kazakhstan; Konstantin Chernov; Sergey Drozdov; Alexandr Elke; Igor Kharitonov; Alexandr Korotkov; Andrey Kryukov; Nurlan Mendygaliyev; Askar Orazalinov; Yevgeniy Prokhin; Thomas Schertwitis; Artemiy Sevostyanov; Igor Zagoruyko; Yevgeniy Zhilyayev	China; Deng Zhaorong; Feng Zewen; Gong Dali; Guo Peilin; Huang Long; Huang Qijiang; Jiang Yihua; Li Wenhua; Ni Shiwei; Peng Tong; Xu Dewen; Yang Yong; Zhao Bilong	Japan

== Results ==
All times are Japan Standard Time (UTC+09:00)

Pos	Team	Pld	W	D	L	GF	GA	GD	Pts
1	Kazakhstan	5	5	0	0	68	40	+28	10
2	China	5	4	0	1	58	31	+27	8
3	Japan	5	3	0	2	56	40	+16	6
4	Iran	5	2	0	3	42	49	−7	4
5	South Korea	5	1	0	4	40	53	−13	2
6	Singapore	5	0	0	5	30	81	−51	0

Source: Results

11 October; 15:00	Iran	10–6	Singapore	Big Wave Pool, Hiroshima
11 October; 15:00	Score by quarters: 2–1, 4–1, 2–3, 2–1			Big Wave Pool, Hiroshima

11 October; 16:30	South Korea	2–11	China	Big Wave Pool, Hiroshima
11 October; 16:30	Score by quarters: 1–2, 0–3, 0–4, 1–2			Big Wave Pool, Hiroshima

11 October; 18:00	Japan	8–11	Kazakhstan	Big Wave Pool, Hiroshima
11 October; 18:00	Score by quarters: 1–2, 2–5, 2–3, 3–1			Big Wave Pool, Hiroshima

12 October; 15:00	Kazakhstan	12–9	China	Big Wave Pool, Hiroshima
12 October; 15:00	Score by quarters: 2–4, 4–1, 3–1, 3–3			Big Wave Pool, Hiroshima

12 October; 16:30	South Korea	14–8	Singapore	Big Wave Pool, Hiroshima
12 October; 16:30	Score by quarters: 4–1, 1–2, 5–2, 4–3			Big Wave Pool, Hiroshima

12 October; 18:00	Japan	15–11	Iran	Big Wave Pool, Hiroshima
12 October; 18:00	Score by quarters: 3–2, 6–4, 3–1, 3–4			Big Wave Pool, Hiroshima

13 October; 15:00	South Korea	10–14	Kazakhstan	Big Wave Pool, Hiroshima

13 October; 16:30	Iran	6–10	China	Big Wave Pool, Hiroshima

13 October; 18:00	Japan	17–3	Singapore	Big Wave Pool, Hiroshima
13 October; 18:00	Score by quarters: 3–1, 6–1, 5–0, 3–1			Big Wave Pool, Hiroshima

14 October; 15:00	Kazakhstan	10–6	Iran	Big Wave Pool, Hiroshima
14 October; 15:00	Score by quarters: 5–1, 2–0, 2–2, 1–3			Big Wave Pool, Hiroshima

14 October; 16:30	Singapore	6–19	China	Big Wave Pool, Hiroshima
14 October; 16:30	Score by quarters: 0–4, 2–7, 3–3, 1–5			Big Wave Pool, Hiroshima

14 October; 18:00	South Korea	6–11	Japan	Big Wave Pool, Hiroshima
14 October; 18:00	Score by quarters: 2–3, 2–1, 1–4, 1–3			Big Wave Pool, Hiroshima

15 October; 15:00	Kazakhstan	21–7	Singapore	Big Wave Pool, Hiroshima
15 October; 15:00	Score by quarters: 5–3, 6–1, 6–1, 4–2			Big Wave Pool, Hiroshima

15 October; 16:30	South Korea	8–9	Iran	Big Wave Pool, Hiroshima
15 October; 16:30	Score by quarters: 1–2, 4–3, 2–2, 1–2			Big Wave Pool, Hiroshima

15 October; 18:00	Japan	5–9	China	Big Wave Pool, Hiroshima
15 October; 18:00	Score by quarters: 0–1, 1–2, 2–3, 2–3			Big Wave Pool, Hiroshima

== Final standing ==
Rank	Team	Pld	W	D	L
1st place, gold medalist(s)	Kazakhstan	5	5	0	0
2nd place, silver medalist(s)	China	5	4	0	1
3rd place, bronze medalist(s)	Japan	5	3	0	2
4	Iran	5	2	0	3
5	South Korea	5	1	0	4
6	Singapore	5	0	0	5
