= Water polo at the 1966 Asian Games =

- Venue: Chula Swimming Stadium
- Dates: 13–17 December 1966
- Nations: 5

Water polo was contested for men only at the 1966 Asian Games in Chula Swimming Stadium, Bangkok, Thailand from 13 to 17 December 1966.

Japan won the gold medal in round robin competition, Singapore won the silver medal and Indonesia 1962 silver medalists this time won the bronze medal.

== Medalists ==
Event	Gold	Silver	Bronze
Men	Japan; Tadashi Fujimoto; Tetsunosuke Ishii; Hirokatsu Kuwayama; Koji Nakano; Seiya Sakamoto; Haruo Sato; Yoji Shimizu; Taira Sugawara; Einosuke Sumitani; Kazuya Takeuchi; Takashi Yokoyama	Singapore; Gan Eng Guan; Gan Eng Joo; Gan Eng Teck; Lim Ting Khiang; Pang Tee Ann; Su Hong Zee; Tan Eng Bock; Tan Eng Liang; Tan Thuan Heng; Tan Yam Cheng; Thio Gim Hock	Indonesia

== Results ==
Pos	Team	Pld	W	D	L	GF	GA	GD	Pts
1	Japan	4	4	0	0	46	8	+38	8
2	Singapore	4	3	0	1	34	17	+17	6
3	Indonesia	4	2	0	2	21	21	0	4
4	Malaysia	4	1	0	3	21	36	−15	2
5	Thailand	4	0	0	4	5	45	−40	0

Source: Results

13 December	Japan	10–1	Indonesia	Chula Swimming Stadium, Bangkok

13 December	Singapore	13–5	Malaysia	Chula Swimming Stadium, Bangkok

14 December	Indonesia	7–6	Malaysia	Chula Swimming Stadium, Bangkok

14 December	Singapore	13–0	Thailand	Chula Swimming Stadium, Bangkok

15 December	Japan	15–1	Thailand	Chula Swimming Stadium, Bangkok

15 December	Indonesia	3–5	Singapore	Chula Swimming Stadium, Bangkok

16 December	Indonesia	10–0	Thailand	Chula Swimming Stadium, Bangkok

16 December	Japan	12–3	Malaysia	Chula Swimming Stadium, Bangkok

17 December	Japan	9–3	Singapore	Chula Swimming Stadium, Bangkok

17 December	Thailand	4–7	Malaysia	Chula Swimming Stadium, Bangkok

== Final standing ==
Rank	Team	Pld	W	D	L
1st place, gold medalist(s)	Japan	4	4	0	0
2nd place, silver medalist(s)	Singapore	4	3	0	1
3rd place, bronze medalist(s)	Indonesia	4	2	0	2
4	Malaysia	4	1	0	3
5	Thailand	4	0	0	4
