= Water polo at the 1986 Asian Games =

- Venue: Jamsil Indoor Swimming Pool
- Dates: 27 September – 2 October 1986
- Nations: 6

Water polo was contested for men only at the 1986 Asian Games at the Jamsil Indoor Swimming Pool, Seoul, South Korea from 27 September to 2 October 1986.

China won the gold medal in round robin competition with a perfect record, South Korea finished second with the silver medal, Singapore won the bronze by better goal difference comparing to the 4th placed team Iran.

== Medalists ==
Event	Gold	Silver	Bronze
Men	China; Cai Shengliu; Cai Tianxiong; Deng Jun; Ge Jianqing; Guan Shishi; Huang Long; Li Jianxiong; Lin Jun; Tang Xiaoyu; Wang Minhui; Wang Xiaotian; Yang Yong; Zhao Bilong	South Korea; Choi Jang-jin; Choi Ki-cheol; Choi Sun-young; Kim Jae-yun; Kim Jin-tae; Kim Jung-yeol; Kim Ki-choon; Lee Jung-suk; Lee Tae-chang; Lee Taek-won; Mun Kong-yeob; Park Sang-won; Song Seung-ho	Singapore; Ang Ban Leong; Ang Kiat Wee; Choo Chin Cheng; Edison Foo; Alan Heng; Tony Koh; Leong Hoe Yin; Lim Teck Yin; Tan Hong Boon; Tay Thiam Hua; Teo Keng Soon; Teo Yong Khoon; Daniel Wee

== Results ==
Pos	Team	Pld	W	D	L	GF	GA	GD	Pts
1	China	5	5	0	0	100	24	+76	10
2	South Korea	5	4	0	1	72	48	+24	8
3	Singapore	5	2	1	2	51	55	−4	5 (Note: Head-to-head result: SIN 8–8 IRN. Overall goal difference was used as the tiebreaker.)
4	Iran	5	2	1	2	38	47	−9	5
5	Kuwait	5	1	0	4	33	74	−41	2
6	India	5	0	0	5	33	79	−46	0

Source: Results
Notes:

27 September	South Korea	16–6	India	Jamsil Indoor Swimming Pool, Seoul

27 September	China	26–3	Kuwait	Jamsil Indoor Swimming Pool, Seoul

27 September	Iran	8–8	Singapore	Jamsil Indoor Swimming Pool, Seoul

28 September	Kuwait	12–9	India	Jamsil Indoor Swimming Pool, Seoul

28 September	South Korea	18–11	Singapore	Jamsil Indoor Swimming Pool, Seoul

28 September	China	21–3	Iran	Jamsil Indoor Swimming Pool, Seoul

29 September	Singapore	14–9	India	Jamsil Indoor Swimming Pool, Seoul

29 September	Iran	6–4	Kuwait	Jamsil Indoor Swimming Pool, Seoul

29 September	South Korea	10–18	China	Jamsil Indoor Swimming Pool, Seoul

1 October	Iran	15–4	India	Jamsil Indoor Swimming Pool, Seoul

1 October	China	13–3	Singapore	Jamsil Indoor Swimming Pool, Seoul

1 October	South Korea	18–7	Kuwait	Jamsil Indoor Swimming Pool, Seoul

2 October	China	22–5	India	Jamsil Indoor Swimming Pool, Seoul

2 October	Singapore	15–7	Kuwait	Jamsil Indoor Swimming Pool, Seoul

2 October	Iran	6–10	South Korea	Jamsil Indoor Swimming Pool, Seoul

== Final standing ==
Rank	Team	Pld	W	D	L
1st place, gold medalist(s)	China	5	5	0	0
2nd place, silver medalist(s)	South Korea	5	4	0	1
3rd place, bronze medalist(s)	Singapore	5	2	1	2
4	Iran	5	2	1	2
5	Kuwait	5	1	0	4
6	India	5	0	0	5
