= Cai Shengliu =

Chinese water polo player (born 1956)

Personal information
- Nationality: Chinese
- Born: 1 April 1956 (age 70)

Sport
- Sport: Water polo
Medal record
Men's water polo
Representing China
Asian Games
Gold medal – first place	1982 Delhi	Team competition
Gold medal – first place	1986 Seoul	Team competition
Gold medal – first place	1990 Beijing	Team competition

Cai Shengliu (born 1 April 1956) is a Chinese water polo player. He competed at the 1984 Summer Olympics and the 1988 Summer Olympics.
