= Kenta Araki =

Japanese water polo player (born 1995)

Personal information
- Born: 6 April 1995 (age 31) Fukuoka, Japan
- Height: 1.84 m (6 ft 0 in)

Sport
- Sport: Water polo
Medal record
Men's water polo
Representing Japan
Asian Games
Gold medal – first place	2022 Hangzhou	Team
Gold medal – first place	2026 Aichi–Nagoya	Team
Silver medal – second place	2018 Jakarta	Team

Kenta Araki (荒木 健太, Araki Kenta, born 6 April 1995) is a Japanese water polo player who competed in the 2020 Summer Olympics.

At the club level he played for Australian side UWA Torpedoes in 2018.

福岡工業高校出身
