= Takashi Yokoyama (water polo) =

Japanese water polo player

Personal information
- Nationality: Japanese
- Born: 30 September 1940 (age 85)

Sport
- Sport: Water polo
Medal record
Representing Japan
Asian Games
Gold medal – first place	1962 Jakarta	Men's tournament
Gold medal – first place	1966 Bangkok	Men's tournament

Takashi Yokoyama (横山 隆, Yokoyama Takashi; born 30 September 1940) is a Japanese water polo player. He competed in the men's tournament at the 1964 Summer Olympics.
