= Li Jianming =

Chinese water polo player

Personal information
- Nationality: Chinese
- Born: 5 September 1957 (age 68)

Sport
- Sport: Water polo
Medal record
Men's water polo
Representing China
Asian Games
Gold medal – first place	1982 Delhi	Team competition

Li Jianming (born 5 September 1957) is a Chinese water polo player. He competed in the men's tournament at the 1984 Summer Olympics.
