= Towa Nishimura =

Japanese water polo player

Personal information
- Nationality: Japanese
- Born: 31 March 1998 (age 28) Kyoto Prefecture, Japan
- Education: Nippon Sport Science University

Sport
- Sport: Water polo
- Position: Goalkeeper
Medal record
Men's water polo
Representing Japan
Asian Games
Gold medal – first place	2022 Hangzhou	Team
Gold medal – first place	2026 Aichi-Nagoya	Team

Towa Nishimura (Japanese: 西村永遠; born 31 March 1998) is a Japanese water polo player who plays as a goalkeeper. He represents Japan internationally and has competed at the 2024 Summer Olympics, the World Aquatics Championships, and the Asian Games. He won gold medals with Japan at the 2022 Asian Games and 2026 Asian Games.

== Career ==
Nishimura was born in Kyoto Prefecture and attended Nippon Sport Science University. He developed as a goalkeeper and became a member of the Japanese national team. He has represented IKAI・Kingfisher74 in domestic and international competition.

Nishimura represented Japan at the 2019 Summer Universiade in Naples, Italy. He was listed as one of Japan's goalkeepers in the men's water polo tournament.

In 2023, Nishimura was selected for Japan's squad at the 2022 Asian Games in Hangzhou, which were held in 2023 after being postponed. Japan won the men's water polo tournament, with Nishimura part of the gold-medal-winning team.

That year, Nishimura also represented Japan at the 2023 World Aquatics Championships in Fukuoka. He was one of the team's goalkeepers alongside Ren Sasano.

In 2024, Nishimura was selected for Japan's men's water polo team at the 2024 Summer Olympics in Paris. Japan finished 11th in the men's tournament.

In 2025, Nishimura continued as a member of the Japanese national team. He competed at the 2025 World Aquatics Championships in Singapore and was listed as Japan's first-choice goalkeeper in the tournament squad. He also represented Japan at the 2025 Asian Water Polo Championship, where he played in goal during Japan's matches, including a 29–1 victory over Chinese Taipei.

In 2026, Nishimura was selected for Japan's men's water polo team at the 2026 Asian Games in Aichi-Nagoya. He was listed as goalkeeper and represented IKAI・Kingfisher74.

At the Asian Games, Nishimura was part of Japan's team that advanced to the final. In the final against Kazakhstan on 3 October, he made several saves as Japan took an early lead and won 24–7. The victory gave Japan its second consecutive and fifth overall Asian Games men's water polo title, while Nishimura won his second Asian Games gold medal.
