= Shigenobu Fujimoto =

Japanese water polo player (born 1939)

Personal information
- Nationality: Japanese
- Born: 3 September 1939 (age 85); Tokyo, Japan

Sport
- Sport: Water polo

Shigenobu Fujimoto (藤本重信, Fujimoto SHigenobu; born 3 September 1939) is a Japanese water polo player. He competed at the 1960 Summer Olympics and the 1964 Summer Olympics.
