= Yang Yong (water polo) =

Chinese water polo player

Personal information
- Born: 19 October 1963 (age 62)
Medal record
Men's water polo
Representing China
Asian Games
Gold medal – first place	1986 Seoul	Team competition
Silver medal – second place	1994 Hiroshima	Team competition

Yang Yong (Chinese: 杨永; born 19 October 1963) is a male Chinese water polo player who was part of the gold medal winning team at the 1986 Asian Games. He also competed at the 1988 Summer Olympics, and was part of the silver medal winning team at the 1994 Asian Games.
