= Water polo at the 1954 Asian Games =

- Dates: 5–8 May 1954
- Nations: 6

Water polo was contested for men only at the 1954 Asian Games in Manila, Philippines.

== Medalists ==
Event	Gold	Silver	Bronze
Men	Singapore; Gan Eng Teck; Ho Kian Bin; Kee Soon Bee; Keith Mitchell; Oh Chwee Hock; Tan Eng Bock; Tan Hwee Hock; Wiebe Wolters	Japan; Hachiro Arakawa; Hirobumi Chige; Shunichi Hiroshiga; Teruyoshi Kanda; Shinichiro Koga; Takayoshi Matsufuji; Osamu Miyabe; Takanao Sado; Haosue Tajina; Nisei Tashiro	Indonesia; Gashmir Daud; Djie Soen Kion; Djie Soen Kwah; Benjamin Idris; Liem Siong Lien; Lim Sing Lok; Margono; Oen Teng Pie; Otman Siragar; Bunasir Surachnad; Tio Tjoe Hong

== Results ==
=== Preliminary round ===
==== Group A ====
Pos	Team	Pld	W	D	L	GF	GA	GD	Pts	Qualification
1	Singapore	2	2	0	0	29	4	+25	4	Final
2	Hong Kong	2	1	0	1	13	17	−4	2	Bronze medal match
3	Philippines	2	0	0	2	3	24	−21	0	5th medal match

Source: Results

5 May	Philippines	2–10	Hong Kong	Manila
5 May	Scoring by half: 1–5, 1–5			Manila

6 May	Singapore	14–1	Philippines	Manila
6 May	Scoring by half: 8–0, 6–1			Manila

7 May	Hong Kong	3–15	Singapore	Manila
7 May	Scoring by half: 2–5, 1–10			Manila

==== Group B ====
Pos	Team	Pld	W	D	L	GF	GA	GD	Pts	Qualification
1	Japan	2	2	0	0	20	3	+17	4	Final
2	Indonesia	2	1	0	1	11	14	−3	2	Bronze medal match
3	Republic of China	2	0	0	2	3	17	−14	0	5th medal match

Source: Results

5 May	Republic of China	0–9	Japan	Manila
5 May	Scoring by half: 0–4, 0–5			Manila

6 May	Japan	11–3	Indonesia	Manila

7 May	Indonesia	8–3	Republic of China	Manila
7 May	Scoring by half: 2–4, 1–4			Manila

=== Final round ===
==== 5th medal match ====
7 May	Philippines	0–4	Republic of China	Manila
7 May	Scoring by half: 0–2, 0–2			Manila

==== Bronze medal match ====
8 May	Hong Kong	5–8	Indonesia	Manila
8 May	Scoring by half: 3–5, 2–3			Manila

==== Final ====
8 May	Singapore	4–2	Japan	Manila
8 May	Scoring by half: 2–0, 2–2			Manila

== Final standing ==
Rank	Team	Pld	W	D	L
1st place, gold medalist(s)	Singapore	3	3	0	0
2nd place, silver medalist(s)	Japan	3	2	0	1
3rd place, bronze medalist(s)	Indonesia	3	2	0	1
4	Hong Kong	3	1	0	2
5	Republic of China	3	1	0	2
6	Philippines	3	0	0	3
