= Mitsuru Takata =

Japanese water polo player

Personal information
- Born: 8 December 1995 (age 30) Hiroshima, Japan
- Height: 182 cm (6 ft 0 in)
- Weight: 86 kg (190 lb)

Sport
- Country: Japan
- Sport: Water polo
Medal record
Men's water polo
Representing Japan
Asian Games
Gold medal – first place	2022 Hangzhou	Team
Gold medal – first place	2026 Aichi–Nagoya	Team
Silver medal – second place	2018 Jakarta	Team

Mitsuru Takata (髙田 充, born 8 December 1995) is a Japanese water polo player. He competed in the 2020 Summer Olympics.
