= Water polo at the 1982 Asian Games =

- Venue: Talkatora Swimming Pool
- Dates: 20–28 November 1982
- Nations: 8

Water polo was contested for men only at the 1982 Asian Games in Talkatora Swimming Pool, New Delhi, India.

== Medalists ==
Event	Gold	Silver	Bronze
Men	China; Cai Shengliu; Cai Tianxiong; Chen Zhixiong; Deng Jun; Li Jianming; Li Jianxiong; Pan Shenghua; Qu Baowei; Song Weigang; Wang Minhui; Wang Xiaotian; Weng Tong; Zhao Bilong	Japan; Etsuji Fujita; Toshio Fukumoto; Akira Hara; Daisuke Houki; Shingo Kai; Go Kimura; Kunihiro Makihashi; Mamoru Matsui; Masahiro Miyahara; Toshiyuki Miyahara; Yoshifumi Saito; Toshinao Shimizu; Narihito Taima	India; Hanumant Barge; Arul Charles; Ramen Das; Sanjay Karandikar; Sushil Kohli; Joseph Kuok; Mahesh Mangani; Rahul Mitra; Utpal Mitra; Prabhakaran Nair; Ramgopal Narayanan; Kanai Roy; Gyan Singh

== Results ==
=== Preliminary round ===
==== Group A ====
Pos	Team	Pld	W	D	L	GF	GA	GD	Pts	Qualification
1	China	3	3	0	0	65	8	+57	6	Semifinals
2	India	3	2	0	1	40	32	+8	4	Semifinals
3	Kuwait	3	1	0	2	23	52	−29	2	
4	Hong Kong	3	0	0	3	11	47	−36	0	

Source: Results

20 November	China	25–2	Kuwait	Talkatora Swimming Pool, New Delhi

20 November	India	14–4	Hong Kong	Talkatora Swimming Pool, New Delhi

21 November	Kuwait	13–3	Hong Kong	Talkatora Swimming Pool, New Delhi

21 November	India	2–20	China	Talkatora Swimming Pool, New Delhi

22 November	China	20–4	Hong Kong	Talkatora Swimming Pool, New Delhi

23 November	India	24–8	Kuwait	Talkatora Swimming Pool, New Delhi

==== Group B ====
Pos	Team	Pld	W	D	L	GF	GA	GD	Pts	Qualification
1	Japan	3	3	0	0	70	7	+63	6	Semifinals
2	Singapore	3	2	0	1	57	23	+34	4	Semifinals
3	Saudi Arabia	3	1	0	2	17	60	−43	2	
4	Bangladesh	3	0	0	3	15	69	−54	0	

Source: Results

20 November	Singapore	27–4	Saudi Arabia	Talkatora Swimming Pool, New Delhi

20 November	Japan	33–0	Bangladesh	Talkatora Swimming Pool, New Delhi

21 November	Japan	15–6	Singapore	Talkatora Swimming Pool, New Delhi

21 November	Saudi Arabia	12–11	Bangladesh	Talkatora Swimming Pool, New Delhi

23 November	Singapore	24–4	Bangladesh	Talkatora Swimming Pool, New Delhi

23 November	Japan	22–1	Saudi Arabia	Talkatora Swimming Pool, New Delhi

=== Classification round ===
27 November	Hong Kong	16–10	Bangladesh	Talkatora Swimming Pool, New Delhi

=== Final round ===
Semifinals
24 November
China	25
Singapore	5
25 November
Japan	22
India	11

Final
28 November
China	11
Japan	10
Bronze medal match
28 November
Singapore	7
India	8

==== Semifinals ====
24 November	China	25–5	Singapore	Talkatora Swimming Pool, New Delhi

25 November	Japan	22–11	India	Talkatora Swimming Pool, New Delhi

==== Bronze medal match ====
28 November	Singapore	7–8	India	Talkatora Swimming Pool, New Delhi

==== Final ====
28 November	China	11–10	Japan	Talkatora Swimming Pool, New Delhi
