= Mineo Kato =

Japanese water polo player (born 1934)

Personal information
- Nationality: Japanese
- Born: 27 March 1934 (age 91); Tokyo, Japan

Sport
- Sport: Water polo

Mineo Kato (加藤峰男, Katō Mineo; born 27 March 1934) is a Japanese former water polo player. He competed at the 1960 Summer Olympics and the 1964 Summer Olympics.

== See also ==
- Japan men's Olympic water polo team records and statistics
- List of men's Olympic water polo tournament goalkeepers
