= Asia Aquatics =

Governing body for aquatics competitions in Asia

- Sport: Aquatic Sports
- Affiliation: World Aquatics

Official website
- www.asiaaquatics.net

Asia Aquatics, formerly Asia Swimming Federation, oversees international aquatics competitions in Asia, and is affiliated to the Olympic Council of Asia and to World Aquatics. It was founded in 1978 in Bangkok; and currently has its administrative headquarters in Muscat, Oman.

As of August 2009, the AASF President is Sheikh Khalid Mohammed Al Badr Al Sabah of Kuwait.

== Members ==
Asian FINA Members (45)
Afghanistan	Bangladesh	Brunei	Bhutan	Cambodia	China
Hong Kong	India	Indonesia	Iran	Iraq	Japan
Jordan	Kazakhstan	Kuwait	Kyrgyzstan	Laos	Lebanon
Macau	Malaysia	Maldives	Mongolia	Myanmar	Nepal
North Korea	Oman	Pakistan	Palestine	Philippines	Qatar
Saudi Arabia	Singapore	South Korea	Sri Lanka	Syria	Chinese Taipei
Tajikistan	Thailand	Turkmenistan	United Arab Emirates	Uzbekistan	Vietnam
Yemen	Bahrain	Timor-Leste			

== Competitions ==
- Swimming: Asian Aquatics Championships
- Aquatics: Asian Age Group Championships
- Diving: Asian Diving Cup
- Water Polo: Asian Water Polo Championship, Asian Water Polo Cup, Asian Water Polo Clubs Championships, Asian Junior Water Polo Championship
- Open Water: Asian Open Water Championships
- Asian Schools Championships
