= Singapore men's national water polo team =

Singapore
- FINA code: SGP
- Association: Singapore Swimming Association / Singapore Water Polo
- Confederation: AASF (Asia)
- Head coach: Kan Aoyagi
- Asst coach: Kenta Shirahama; Rio Shirahama
- Captain: Kai Lee
- Home venue: OCBC Aquatic Centre

Olympic Games
- Appearances: 1 (first in 1956)
- Best result: 10th place (1956)

World Championship
- Appearances: 1 (first in 2025)
- Best result: 15th place (2025)

The Singapore men's national water polo team is the representative for Singapore in international men's water polo.

Singapore won the gold medal in the 1954 Asian Games, beating favourite Japan, 4–2 in the finals. In the 1986 Asian Games, Singapore won the bronze medal on better goal difference comparing to the 4th placed team Iran.

At the Southeast Asian Games, Singapore has traditionally been the dominant team as they won 27 consecutive gold medals. The streak finally ended at the 2019 Southeast Asian Games when they ceded the title to Indonesia.

2019 head coach was Dejan Milakovic whereas team captain was Koh Jian Ying. 2023, Singapore regain the top spot at the games winning the gold medal again. Head coach is Kan Aoyagi.

== Results ==
=== Olympic Games ===
- 1956 — 10th place

=== World Championships ===
- 2025 – 15th place

=== Asian Games ===
- 2022 – 5th place
- 2026 –

== Current squad ==
Roster for the 2025 World Championships.

Head coach: Kan Aoyagi

- 1 Chou Hsiang-Ken GK
- 2 Loh Zhi Zhi FP
- 3 Fong Wai Chun FP
- 4 Wen Zhe Goh FP
- 5 Cayden Loh Dejun FP
- 6 Yap Dong Xuan Ryan FP
- 7 Dominic Chan Bo Xuan FP
- 8 Shaunn Blasius Lok Jun Jie FP
- 9 Sanjiv Rajandra FP
- 10 Justin Saik Kin Yan FP
- 11 See Tien Ee Jayden FP
- 12 Koh Jian Ying FP
- 13 Lee Kai Yang GK
- 14 Matthias Goh Zoltin FP
- 15 Darren Lee Jit An GK
