= Japan at the 2025 World Aquatics Championships =

- Flag of Japan
- World Aquatics code: JPN
- National federation: Japan Swimming Federation
- Website: swim.or.jp (in Japanese)

in Singapore
- Competitors: 82 in 5 sports
- Medals Ranked 12th: Gold 1 Silver 4 Bronze 3 Total 8

World Aquatics Championships appearances
- 1973; 1975; 1978; 1982; 1986; 1991; 1994; 1998; 2001; 2003; 2005; 2007; 2009; 2011; 2013; 2015; 2017; 2019; 2022; 2023; 2024; 2025

Japan competed at the 2025 World Aquatics Championships in Singapore from July 11 to August 3, 2025.

== Medalists ==
Medal	Name	Sport	Event	Date
1st place, gold medalist(s)	Ichika Kajimoto	Open water swimming	Women's 3 km knockout sprints	July 19
2nd place, silver medalist(s)	Kaho Aitaka; Moka Fujii; Moe Higa; Yuka Kawase; Uta Kobayashi; Tomoka Sato; Nao Shirahase; Sakurako Uchida	Artistic swimming	Team free routine	July 20
2nd place, silver medalist(s)	Ippei Watanabe	Swimming	Men's 200 metre breaststroke	August 1
2nd place, silver medalist(s)	Tomoyuki Matsushita	Swimming	Men's 400 metre individual medley	August 3
2nd place, silver medalist(s)	Mio Narita	Swimming	Women's 400 metre individual medley	August 3
3rd place, bronze medalist(s)	Ichika Kajimoto	Open water swimming	Women's 5 km	July 18
3rd place, bronze medalist(s)	Reo Nishida; Sho Sakai; Rin Kaneto; Sayaka Mikami	Diving	Team event	July 26
3rd place, bronze medalist(s)	Tatsuya Murasa	Swimming	Men's 200 metre freestyle	July 29

== Competitors ==
The following is the list of competitors in the Championships.

Sport	Men	Women	Total
Artistic swimming	0	9	9
Diving	6	2	8
Open water swimming	1	2	3
Swimming	19	14	33
Water polo	15	15	30
Total	41	41	82

== Artistic swimming ==
Women

Athlete	Event	Preliminaries		Final	
Athlete	Event	Points	Rank	Points	Rank
Moe Higa	Solo technical routine	249.1833	6 Q	251.2184	6
Moe Higa; Tomoka Sato	Duet technical routine	293.4950	4 Q	295.6240	4
Uta Kobayashi; Tomoka Sato	Duet free routine	255.9020	4 Q	254.9917	7

Mixed

Athlete	Event	Preliminaries		Final	
Athlete	Event	Points	Rank	Points	Rank
Kaho Aitaka; Moka Fujii; Moe Higa; Yuka Kawase; Uta Kobayashi; Hinata Kumagai; Tomoka Sato; Nao Shirahase	Team technical routine	265.7967	6 Q	282.4134	4
Kaho Aitaka; Moka Fujii; Moe Higa; Yuka Kawase; Uta Kobayashi; Tomoka Sato; Nao Shirahase; Sakurako Uchida	Team free routine	327.9186	3 Q	334.7232	2nd place, silver medalist(s)
'Kaho Aitaka; Moka Fujii; Moe Higa; Yuka Kawase; Uta Kobayashi; Hinata Kumagai; Tomoka Sato; Sakurako Uchida	Team acrobatic routine	191.0638	9 Q	193.0367	10

== Diving ==
Men

Athlete	Event	Preliminaries		Semifinals		Final	
Athlete	Event	Points	Rank	Points	Rank	Points	Rank
Senri Ikuma	1 m springboard	Did not start		—N/a		Did not advance	
Reo Nishida	10 m platform	335.10	34	Did not advance			
Sho Sakai	3 m springboard	396.80	10 Q	395.75	12 Q	406.45	11
Haruki Suyama	3 m springboard	343.30	39	Did not advance			
Rikuto Tamai	10 m platform	466.60	3 Q	480.20	3 Q	492.55	6
Senri Ikuma; Haruki Suyama	3 m synchro springboard	362.91	11	—N/a		Did not advance	
Shu Ohkubo; Rikuto Tamai	10 m synchro platform	373.38	7 Q	—N/a		369.24	8

Women

Athlete	Event	Preliminaries		Semifinals		Final	
Athlete	Event	Points	Rank	Points	Rank	Points	Rank
Rin Kaneto	10 m platform	306.25	6 Q	305.70	9 Q	306.20	10
Sayaka Mikami	3 m springboard	283.75	12 Q	300.45	7 Q	320.15	5

Mixed

Athlete	Event	Final	
Athlete	Event	Points	Rank
Reo Nishida; Sho Sakai; Rin Kaneto; Sayaka Mikami	Team event	409.65	3rd place, bronze medalist(s)

== Open water swimming ==
Men

Athlete	Event	Heat		Semi-final		Final	
Athlete	Event	Time	Rank	Time	Rank	Time	Rank
Riku Takaki	Men's 3 km knockout sprints	18:46.6	27	Did not advance			
Riku Takaki	Men's 5 km	—N/a				1:01:26.9	39
Riku Takaki	Men's 10 km	—N/a				2:09:18.8	34
Kaito Tsujimori	Men's 3 km knockout sprints	17:16.6	13	Did not advance			
Kaito Tsujimori	Men's 5 km	—N/a				1:01:00.2	25
Kaito Tsujimori	Men's 10 km	—N/a				2:01:47.9	11

Women

Athlete	Event	Heat		Semi-final		Final	
Athlete	Event	Time	Rank	Time	Rank	Time	Rank
Ichika Kajimoto	Women's 3 km knockout sprints	18:09.9	2 Q	12:09.7	2 Q	6:19.9	1st place, gold medalist(s)
Ichika Kajimoto	Women's 5 km	—N/a				1:02:28.9	3rd place, bronze medalist(s)
Ichika Kajimoto	Women's 10 km	—N/a				2:09:27.8	8

== Swimming ==
Japan entered 32 swimmers.

Men

Athlete	Event	Heat		Semi-final		Final	
Athlete	Event	Time	Rank	Time	Rank	Time	Rank
Yamato Fukasawa	100 m breaststroke	1:00.23	18	Did not advance			
Yamato Fukasawa	200 m breaststroke	2:10.83	9 Q	2:08.45	4 Q	2:09.21	6
Kazushi Imafuku	400 m freestyle	3:48.69	19	—N/a		Did not advance	
Kazushi Imafuku	1500 m freestyle	15:24.98	15	—N/a		Did not advance	
Kosuke Makino	200 m individual medley	1:57.74	2 Q	1:57.51	9 Q	1:59.25	8
Katsuhiro Matsumoto	50 m butterfly	23.34	19	Did not advance			
Katsuhiro Matsumoto	100 m butterfly	51.30	8 Q	51.20	11	Did not advance	
Tomoyuki Matsushita	200 m individual medley	1:58.28	10 Q	1:57.11	4 Q	1:57.52	6
Tomoyuki Matsushita	400 m individual medley	4:10.39	1 Q	—N/a		4:08.32	2nd place, silver medalist(s)
Riku Matsuyama	50 m backstroke	25.11	29	Did not advance			
Riku Matsuyama	100 m backstroke	53.94	21	Did not advance			
Naoki Mizunuma	100 m butterfly	51.44	14 Q	50.96	9	Did not advance	
Tatsuya Murasa	200 m freestyle	1:45.92	5 Q	1:45.39	6 Q	1:44.54 NR	3rd place, bronze medalist(s)
Akira Namba	50 m freestyle	22.41	38	Did not advance			
Asaki Nishikawa	400 m individual medley	4:10.41	2 Q	—N/a		4:10.21	4
Kodai Nishiono	200 m backstroke	1:56.55	6 Q	1:56.04	11	Did not advance	
So Ogata	200 m butterfly	1:55.37	9 Q	1:55.42	12	Did not advance	
Hidekazu Takehara	200 m backstroke	1:57.25	19	Did not advance			
Taikan Tanaka	50 m butterfly	23.58	31	Did not advance			
Taku Taniguchi	50 m breaststroke	26.65 NR	2 Q	27.07	16	Did not advance	
Taku Taniguchi	100 m breaststroke	59.75	12 Q	59.59	14	Did not advance	
Genki Terakado	200 m butterfly	1:54.64	6 Q	1:55.30	11	Did not advance	
Ippei Watanabe	200 m breaststroke	2:08.41	2 Q	2:08.01	1 Q	2:07.70	2nd place, silver medalist(s)
Toshinari Yanagisawa	50 m breaststroke	27.23	18	Did not advance			
Masaki Yura	50 m backstroke	25.35	38	Did not advance			
Tatsuya Murasa; Tomoyuki Matsushita; So Ogata; Asaki Nishikawa	4 × 200 m freestyle relay	7:09.17	10	—N/a		Did not advance	
Riku Matsuyama; Taku Taniguchi; Naoki Mizunuma; Katsuhiro Matsumoto	4 × 100 m medley relay	3:34.36	13	—N/a		Did not advance	

Women

Athlete	Event	Heat		Semi-final		Final	
Athlete	Event	Time	Rank	Time	Rank	Time	Rank
Reona Aoki	100 m breaststroke	1:07.19	20	Did not advance			
Yasuki Fujimoto	200 m butterfly	2:09.70	12 Q	2:10.20	13	Did not advance	
Mizuki Hirai	50 m butterfly	25.64	9 Q	25.63	9	Did not advance	
Mizuki Hirai	100 m butterfly	56.81	4 Q	56.86	7 Q	56.83	7
Rikako Ikee	50 m butterfly	25.63	7 Q	25.67	11	Did not advance	
Rikako Ikee	100 m butterfly	57.75	13 Q	57.89	14	Did not advance	
Nagisa Ikemoto	100 m freestyle	54.90	25	Did not advance			
Nagisa Ikemoto	200 m freestyle	1:58.61	18	Did not advance			
Ichika Kajimoto	400 m freestyle	4:08.79	12	—N/a		Did not advance	
Ichika Kajimoto	800 m freestyle	8:27.51	8 Q	—N/a		8:26.85	8
Ichika Kajimoto	1500 m freestyle	16:09.65	10	—N/a		Did not advance	
Kotomi Kato	200 m breaststroke	2:27.91	22	Did not advance			
Waka Kobori	200 m freestyle	1:59.06	22	Did not advance			
Waka Kobori	400 m individual medley	4:36.62	4 Q	—N/a		4:38.05	7
Shiho Matsumoto	200 m individual medley	2:10.94	8 Q	2:11.69	14	Did not advance	
Miyu Namba	400 m freestyle	4:08.72	11	—N/a		Did not advance	
Mio Narita	200 m backstroke	2:11.58	20	Did not advance			
Mio Narita	200 m individual medley	2:10.87	7 Q	2:09.16	3 Q	2:09.56	5
Mio Narita	400 m individual medley	4:37.12	6 Q	—N/a		4:33.26	2nd place, silver medalist(s)
Satomi Suzuki	50 m breaststroke	30.91	21	Did not advance			
Satomi Suzuki	100 m breaststroke	1:06.13	3 Q	1:06.12	6 Q	1:05.78	4
Satomi Suzuki	200 m breaststroke	2:25.26	9 Q	2:26.44	14	Did not advance	
Miki Takahashi	50 m backstroke	28.12	20	Did not advance			
Chiaki Yamamoto	200 m backstroke	2:12.63	25	Did not advance			
Nagisa Ikemoto; Miyu Namba; Waka Kobori; Ichika Kajimoto	4 × 200 m freestyle relay	7:58.80	8 Q	—N/a		7:58.13	8
Miki Takahashi; Satomi Suzuki; Mizuki Hirai; Nagisa Ikemoto	4 × 100 m medley relay	3:56.85	5 Q	—N/a		3:57.63	7

Mixed

Athlete	Event	Heat		Final	
Athlete	Event	Time	Rank	Time	Rank
Tatsuya Murasa; Taikan Tanaka; Nagisa Ikemoto; Mizuki Hirai	4 × 100 m freestyle relay	3:26.77	14	Did not advance	
Riku Matsuyama; Taku Taniguchii; Mizuki Hirai; Nagisa Ikemoto	4 × 100 m medley relay	3:43.57	6 Q	3:44.15	7

== Water polo ==
Summary

Team	Event	Group stage				Playoff	Quarterfinal	Semi-final	Final / BM	
Team	Event	Opposition Score	Opposition Score	Opposition Score	Rank	Opposition Score	Opposition Score	Opposition Score	Opposition Score	Rank
Japan	Men's tournament	Spain; L 16–22	Hungary; L 18–23	Australia; W 12–11	3 P/Off	Serbia; L 14–21	—N/a	Brazil; W 22–11	Romania; W 20–19	9
Japan	Women's tournament	Croatia; W 25–12	Hungary; L 13–33	Greece; L 15–25	3 P/Off	Great Britain; W 23–10	United States; L 8–26	Australia; L 17–21	Italy; L 15–20	8

=== Men's tournament ===
Team roster

The following is the Japanese roster.

Head coach: Yoshinori Shiota

- 1 Towa Nishimura GK
- 2 Seiya Adachi FP
- 3 Taiyo Watanabe FP
- 4 Toshiyuki Maeda FP
- 5 Enishi Ura FP
- 6 Toi Suzuki FP
- 7 Kiyomu Date FP
- 8 Mitsuru Takata FP
- 9 Ikkei Nitta FP
- 10 Yusuke Inaba FP
- 11 Daichi Ogihara FP
- 12 Kenta Araki FP
- 13 Ren Sasano GK
- 14 Jun Lowrey FP
- 15 Yuki Moriya FP

Group play

Pos	Team	Pld	W	PSW	PSL	L	GF	GA	GD	Pts	Qualification
1	Spain	3	3	0	0	0	42	32	+10	9	Quarterfinals
2	Hungary	3	2	0	0	1	50	34	+16	6	Playoffs
3	Japan	3	1	0	0	2	46	56	−10	3	Playoffs
4	Australia	3	0	0	0	3	24	40	−16	0	13–16th place semifinals

Source: Omegatiming
Rules for classification: 1) points; 2) head-to-head points; 3) head-to-head goal difference; 4) head-to-head number of goals scored; 5) Goal difference.

12 July 2025; 16:00	Report	Spain	22–16	Japan	OCBC Aquatic Centre, Singapore; Referees: Scott Voltz (USA), Michiel Zwart (NED)
12 July 2025; 16:00	Report	Score by quarters: 5–3, 6–2, 5–4, 6–7			OCBC Aquatic Centre, Singapore; Referees: Scott Voltz (USA), Michiel Zwart (NED)
12 July 2025; 16:00	Report	Granados 5	Goals	Inaba 5	OCBC Aquatic Centre, Singapore; Referees: Scott Voltz (USA), Michiel Zwart (NED)

14 July 2025; 13:45	Report	Japan	18–23	Hungary	OCBC Aquatic Centre, Singapore; Referees: Georgios Stavridis (GRE), Germán Moller (ARG)
14 July 2025; 13:45	Report	Score by quarters: 5–5, 3–5, 3–5, 7–8			OCBC Aquatic Centre, Singapore; Referees: Georgios Stavridis (GRE), Germán Moller (ARG)
14 July 2025; 13:45	Report	Adachi, Watanabe 4	Goals	Vismeg 4	OCBC Aquatic Centre, Singapore; Referees: Georgios Stavridis (GRE), Germán Moller (ARG)

16 July 2025; 10:35	Report	Australia	11–12	Japan	OCBC Aquatic Centre, Singapore; Referees: Germán Moller (ARG), Michiel Zwart (NED)
16 July 2025; 10:35	Report	Score by quarters: 3–3, 2–3, 2–0, 4–6			OCBC Aquatic Centre, Singapore; Referees: Germán Moller (ARG), Michiel Zwart (NED)
16 July 2025; 10:35	Report	Power 5	Goals	four players 2	OCBC Aquatic Centre, Singapore; Referees: Germán Moller (ARG), Michiel Zwart (NED)

Playoffs

18 July 2025; 16:00	Report	Serbia	21–14	Japan	OCBC Aquatic Centre, Singapore; Referees: David Gómez (ESP), Frank Ohme (GER)
18 July 2025; 16:00	Report	Score by quarters: 5–2, 4–3, 9–3, 3–6			OCBC Aquatic Centre, Singapore; Referees: David Gómez (ESP), Frank Ohme (GER)
18 July 2025; 16:00	Report	Vapenski 4	Goals	three players 3	OCBC Aquatic Centre, Singapore; Referees: David Gómez (ESP), Frank Ohme (GER)

9th–12th place semifinals

20 July 2025; 12:10	Report	Japan	22–11	Brazil	OCBC Aquatic Centre, Singapore; Referees: Germán Moller (ARG), Scott Voltz (USA)
20 July 2025; 12:10	Report	Score by quarters: 7–1, 7–4, 4–3, 4–3			OCBC Aquatic Centre, Singapore; Referees: Germán Moller (ARG), Scott Voltz (USA)
20 July 2025; 12:10	Report	Inaba 5	Goals	Real 3	OCBC Aquatic Centre, Singapore; Referees: Germán Moller (ARG), Scott Voltz (USA)

Ninth place game

22 July 2025; 10:35	Report	Japan	20–19 (PSO)	Romania	OCBC Aquatic Centre, Singapore; Referees: Alessia Ferrari (ITA), Scott Voltz (USA)
22 July 2025; 10:35	Report	Score by quarters: 8–1, 4–3, 2–8, 2–4 PSO: 4–3			OCBC Aquatic Centre, Singapore; Referees: Alessia Ferrari (ITA), Scott Voltz (USA)
22 July 2025; 10:35	Report	Inaba 5	Goals	Georgescu, Neamțu 3	OCBC Aquatic Centre, Singapore; Referees: Alessia Ferrari (ITA), Scott Voltz (USA)

=== Women's tournament ===
Team roster

The following is the Japanese roster.

Head coach: Shota Hazui

- 1 Haruka Inaba GK
- 2 Yumi Arima FP
- 3 Akari Inaba FP
- 4 Eruna Ura FP
- 5 Kako Kawaguchi FP
- 6 Hikaru Shitara FP
- 7 Ai Sunabe FP
- 8 Saya Sekine FP
- 9 Riko Otsubo FP
- 10 Fuka Nishiyama FP
- 11 Momo Inoue FP
- 12 Maho Kobayashi FP
- 13 Manami Noda GK
- 14 Shoka Fukuda FP
- 15 Momone Ninagawa FP

Group play

Pos	Team	Pld	W	PSW	PSL	L	GF	GA	GD	Pts	Qualification
1	Hungary	3	3	0	0	0	65	28	+37	9	Quarterfinals
2	Greece	3	2	0	0	1	65	32	+33	6	Playoffs
3	Japan	3	1	0	0	2	53	70	−17	3	Playoffs
4	Croatia	3	0	0	0	3	25	78	−53	0	13–16th place semifinals

Source: Omegatiming
Rules for classification: 1) points; 2) head-to-head points; 3) head-to-head goal difference; 4) head-to-head number of goals scored; 5) Goal difference.

11 July 2025; 16:00	Report	Japan	25–12	Croatia	OCBC Aquatic Centre, Singapore; Referees: Fiona Haigh (AUS), Zhang Liang (CHN)
11 July 2025; 16:00	Report	Score by quarters: 7–3, 4–3, 11–5, 3–1			OCBC Aquatic Centre, Singapore; Referees: Fiona Haigh (AUS), Zhang Liang (CHN)
11 July 2025; 16:00	Report	Arima 7	Goals	Rožić 4	OCBC Aquatic Centre, Singapore; Referees: Fiona Haigh (AUS), Zhang Liang (CHN)

13 July 2025; 10:35	Report	Hungary	33–13	Japan	OCBC Aquatic Centre, Singapore; Referees: Germán Moller (ARG), Megan Perry (NZL)
13 July 2025; 10:35	Report	Score by quarters: 8–3, 8–2, 9–3, 8–5			OCBC Aquatic Centre, Singapore; Referees: Germán Moller (ARG), Megan Perry (NZL)
13 July 2025; 10:35	Report	Rybanska, Vályi 6	Goals	Arima 4	OCBC Aquatic Centre, Singapore; Referees: Germán Moller (ARG), Megan Perry (NZL)

15 July 2025; 10:35	Report	Greece	25–15	Japan	OCBC Aquatic Centre, Singapore; Referees: Wu Zhekang (SGP), Scott Voltz (USA)
15 July 2025; 10:35	Report	Score by quarters: 6–3, 6–3, 6–4, 7–5			OCBC Aquatic Centre, Singapore; Referees: Wu Zhekang (SGP), Scott Voltz (USA)
15 July 2025; 10:35	Report	Myriokefalitaki 7	Goals	Kawaguchi 5	OCBC Aquatic Centre, Singapore; Referees: Wu Zhekang (SGP), Scott Voltz (USA)

Playoffs

17 July 2025; 20:45	Report	Japan	23–10	Great Britain	OCBC Aquatic Centre, Singapore; Referees: Aurély Blanchard (FRA), Fiona Haigh (AUS)
17 July 2025; 20:45	Report	Score by quarters: 6–2, 5–2, 5–1, 7–5			OCBC Aquatic Centre, Singapore; Referees: Aurély Blanchard (FRA), Fiona Haigh (AUS)
17 July 2025; 20:45	Report	Ura 4	Goals	five players 2	OCBC Aquatic Centre, Singapore; Referees: Aurély Blanchard (FRA), Fiona Haigh (AUS)

Quarterfinals

19 July 2025; 17:35	Report	United States	26–8	Japan	OCBC Aquatic Centre, Singapore; Referees: Alessia Ferrari (ITA), Marta Cabanas (ESP)
19 July 2025; 17:35	Report	Score by quarters: 10–2, 6–1, 5–2, 5–3			OCBC Aquatic Centre, Singapore; Referees: Alessia Ferrari (ITA), Marta Cabanas (ESP)
19 July 2025; 17:35	Report	Pearson 5	Goals	Sunabe, Ura 2	OCBC Aquatic Centre, Singapore; Referees: Alessia Ferrari (ITA), Marta Cabanas (ESP)

5-8th place semifinals

21 July 2025; 16:00	Report	Australia	21–17	Japan	OCBC Aquatic Centre, Singapore; Referees: Jennifer McCall (USA), Germán Moller (ARG)
21 July 2025; 16:00	Report	Score by quarters: 7–6, 6–4, 2–3, 6–4			OCBC Aquatic Centre, Singapore; Referees: Jennifer McCall (USA), Germán Moller (ARG)
21 July 2025; 16:00	Report	Jackovich 5	Goals	Arima 5	OCBC Aquatic Centre, Singapore; Referees: Jennifer McCall (USA), Germán Moller (ARG)

Fifth place game

23 July 2025; 16:00	Report	Japan	15–20	Italy	OCBC Aquatic Centre, Singapore; Referees: Aurély Blanchard (FRA), Nicholas Hodgers (AUS)
23 July 2025; 16:00	Report	Score by quarters: 5–5, 2–5, 2–6, 6–4			OCBC Aquatic Centre, Singapore; Referees: Aurély Blanchard (FRA), Nicholas Hodgers (AUS)
23 July 2025; 16:00	Report	Fukuda 3	Goals	Cergol, Gagliardi 5	OCBC Aquatic Centre, Singapore; Referees: Aurély Blanchard (FRA), Nicholas Hodgers (AUS)
