= Water polo at the 2026 Asian Games =

- Venue: Nippon Gaishi Hall Rainbow Pool
- Date: 20 September – 3 October 2026
- Competitors: 209 from 9 nations

Water polo at the 2026 Asian Games was held at the Nippon Gaishi Hall Rainbow Pool, Nagoya, Japan from 20 September to 3 October 2026. Nine countries with eight men's teams and six women's teams participated in the competition.

== Schedule ==
●	Round	●	Last round	P	Preliminary round	C	Classification	¼	Quarterfinals	½	Semifinals	F	Finals

Event↓/Date →	20th Sun	21st Mon	22nd Tue	23rd Wed	24th Thu	25th Fri	26th Sat	27th Sun	28th Mon	29th Tue	30th Wed	1st Thu	2nd Fri		3rd Sat	
Men	—N/a						P	P	P	¼	¼	—N/a	C	½	C	F
Women	●	●	●	●	●	—N/a										

== Medal summary ==
=== Medal table ===
Rank	Nation	Gold	Silver	Bronze	Total
1	Japan*	1	1	0	2
2	China	1	0	1	2
3	Kazakhstan	0	1	0	1
4	Thailand	0	0	1	1
Totals (4 entries)		2	2	2	6

=== Medalists ===
Event	Gold	Silver	Bronze
Men	Japan; Towa Nishimura; Seiya Adachi; Taiyo Watanabe; Daichi Ogihara; Enishi Ura; Yuki Moriya; Kiyomu Date; Mitsuru Takata; Ikkei Nitta; Yusuke Inaba; Toi Suzuki; Kenta Araki; Ren Sasano; Jun Lowrey; Kai Inoue	Kazakhstan; Temirlan Balfanbayev; Eduard Tsoy; Ruslan Akhmetov; Dušan Marković; Nurassyl Satbergen; Alexey Shmider; Murat Shakenov; Srdjan Vuksanovich; Rustam Ukumanov; Mikhail Ruday; Yulian Verdesh; Sultan Shonzhigitov; Akzhan Aday; Adil Baltabekuly; Yegor Beloussov	China; Wu Honghui; Liu Yu; Zhao Yuehao; Yang Yiheng; He Xingmeng; Lyu Zikang; Chen Zhongxian; Ouyang Haiyuan; Zhu Beile; Yang Shanglin; Cai Yuhao; Shen Dingsong; Liang Zhiwei; Li Wanxiang; Li Diheng
Women	China; Du Xinyue; Zhang Yumian; Yan Jing; Zhou Shang; Xie Liyi; Wang Shiyun; Shao Yixin; Chen Jiaqing; Yan Siya; Nong Sanfeng; Zhang Qishuo; Wang Xuan; Shen Yineng; Zhang Jingwen; Zou Yuhe	Japan; Haruka Inaba; Yumi Arima; Akari Inaba; Eruna Ura; Kako Kawaguchi; Hikaru Shitara; Ai Sunabe; Saya Sekine; Riko Otsubo; Fuka Nishiyama; Momo Inoue; Maho Kobayashi; Manami Noda; Nina Lowrey; Shoka Fukuda	Thailand; Phantila Arsayuth; Thanidakam Kwantongtanaree; Panita Pukkaman; Janista Thinwilai; Paranee Chotrotchanaanan; Thanita Kongchouy; Kritsana Puangtong; Nattaman Khamma; Raksina Rueangsappaisan; Sarocha Rueangsappaisan; Pittayaporn Kwantongtanaree; Pimpin Ngamcharoensuktaworn; Nareenun Kittipolpuwarag; Kanruetai Riangsuntea; Panchita Rodwattanadisakul

== Draw ==
A draw ceremony was held on 23 July 2026 to determine the groups for the men's competition. The women were played in round robin format.

=== Men ===
Group A

- Thailand
- Kazakhstan
- Japan (hosts)
- Hong Kong

Group B

- South Korea
- Iran
- Singapore
- China

=== Women ===
- China
- Japan (hosts)
- Kazakhstan
- Singapore
- Thailand
- Uzbekistan

== Final standing ==
=== Men ===
Rank	Team	Pld	W	PW	PL	L
1st place, gold medalist(s)	Japan	6	6	0	0	0
2nd place, silver medalist(s)	Kazakhstan	6	4	0	0	2
3rd place, bronze medalist(s)	China	6	4	0	0	2
4	Iran	6	3	0	0	3
5	South Korea	6	3	0	1	2
6	Hong Kong	6	2	0	0	4
7	Singapore	6	1	1	0	4
8	Thailand	6	0	0	0	6

=== Women ===
Rank	Team	Pld	W	PW	PL	L
1st place, gold medalist(s)	China	5	4	1	0	0
2nd place, silver medalist(s)	Japan	5	4	0	1	0
3rd place, bronze medalist(s)	Thailand	5	2	0	1	2
4	Kazakhstan	5	1	1	1	2
5	Uzbekistan	5	1	1	0	3
6	Singapore	5	0	0	0	5
