= Water polo at the 2025 World Aquatics Championships – Women's team rosters =

This article shows the roster of all participating teams at the women's water polo tournament at the 2025 World Aquatics Championships.

== Group A ==
=== Australia ===
The following is the Australian roster.

Head coach: Rebecca Rippon

- 1 Gabriella Palm GK
- 2 Hayley Ballesty FP
- 3 Tenealle Fasala FP
- 4 Bronte Halligan FP
- 5 Sienna Green FP
- 6 Abby Andrews FP
- 7 Charlize Andrews FP
- 8 Sienna Hearn FP
- 9 Pippa Pedley FP
- 10 Alice Williams FP
- 11 Matilda Kearns FP
- 12 Danijela Jackvoch FP
- 13 Genevieve Longman GK
- 14 Alexie Lambert FP
- 15 Olivia Mitchell FP

=== Italy ===
The following is the Italian roster.

Head coach: Carlo Silipo

- 1 Aurora Condorelli GK
- 2 Morena Leone FP
- 3 Paola di Maria FP
- 4 Sara Cordovani FP
- 5 Veronica Gant FP
- 6 Lucrezia Cergol FP
- 7 Sofia Giustini FP
- 8 Roberta Bianconi FP
- 9 Dafne Bettini FP
- 10 Chiara Ranalli FP
- 11 Agnese Cocchiere FP
- 12 Gaia Gagliardi FP
- 13 Helga Maria Santapaola GK
- 14 Alessia Millo FP
- 15 Carlotta Meggiato FP

=== New Zealand ===
The following is the New Zealander roster.

Head coach: Angela Winstanley-Smith

- 1 Jessica Milicich GK
- 2 Emily Nicholson FP
- 3 Gabrielle Doyle FP
- 4 Libby Gault FP
- 5 Gabrielle Milicich FP
- 6 Darcy Spark FP
- 7 Emmerson Houghton FP
- 8 Millie Quin FP
- 9 Sophie Shorter-Robinson FP
- 10 Morgan McDowall FP
- 11 Kaitlin Howarth FP
- 12 Agatha Weston FP
- 13 Bridget Layburn GK
- 14 Holly Dunn FP

=== Singapore ===
The following is the Singaporean roster.

Head coach: Yu Lei

- 1 Rochelle Ong GK
- 2 Charlene Tio FP
- 3 Loh Yu Xuan FP
- 4 Yap Jingxuan FP
- 5 Koh Ting Ting FP
- 6 Nicole Lim FP
- 7 Abielle Yeo FP
- 8 Heather Lee FP
- 9 Kayla Yeo FP
- 10 Ong Cheng Jing FP
- 11 Wan Celeste FP
- 12 Ariel Charis Lim FP
- 13 Mounisha Devi GK
- 14 Koh Xiao Li FP

== Group B ==
=== Argentina ===
The following is Argentinian roster.

Head coach: Guillermo Setti / Fabio Lombardo

- 1 Nahir Stegmayer GK
- 2 Maitena Romano FP
- 3 Bianca Perasso FP
- 4 Isabella Mastronardi FP
- 5 Manuela Tamagnone Werbach FP
- 6 Maylen Sampedro FP
- 7 Julieta Auliel FP
- 8 Carla Comba FP
- 9 María Canda FP
- 10 Ana Agnesina FP
- 11 Anahi Bacigalupo FP
- 12 Isabel Riley FP
- 13 Lola Canales GK
- 14 Agustina Todoroff FP

=== China ===
The following is the Chinese roster.

Head coach: Miki Oca

- 1 Du Xinyue GK
- 2 Zhang Yumian FP
- 3 Yan Jing FP
- 4 Zhou Shang FP
- 5 Zou Yuhe FP
- 6 Wang Shiyun FP
- 7 Shao Yixin FP
- 8 Wang Huan FP
- 9 Yan Siya FP
- 10 Nong Sanfeng FP
- 11 Zhang Qishuo FP
- 12 Wang Xuan FP
- 13 Shen Yineng GK
- 14 Ma Li FP
- 15 Zhang Jingwen FP

=== Netherlands ===
The following is the Dutch roster.

Head coach: Evangelos Doudesis

- 1 Sarah Buis GK
- 2 Marit van der Weijden FP
- 3 Simone van de Kraats FP
- 4 Sabrina van der Sloot FP
- 5 Maartje Keuning FP
- 6 Fleurien Bosveld FP
- 7 Bente Rogge FP
- 8 Vivian Sevenich FP
- 9 Kitty-Lynn Joustra FP
- 10 Lieke Rogge FP
- 11 Maxine Schaap FP
- 12 Nina ten Broek FP
- 13 Britt van den Dobbelsteen GK
- 14 Noa de Vries FP
- 15 Pien Gorter FP

=== United States ===
The following is the American roster.

Head coach: Adam Krikorian

- 1 Amanda Longan GK
- 2 Ava Stryker FP
- 3 Tara Prentice FF
- 4 Anna Pearson FP
- 5 Jenna Flynn FP
- 6 Julia Bonaguidi FP
- 7 Jovana Sekulic FP
- 8 Ryann Neushul FP
- 9 Jewel Roemer FP
- 10 Emma Lineback FP
- 11 Emily Ausmus FP
- 12 Ella Woodhead FP
- 13 Isabel Williams GK
- 14 Rachel Gazzaniga FP
- 15 Malia Allen FP

== Group C ==
=== Croatia ===
The following is the Croatian roster.

Head coach: Mia Simunić

- 1 Latica Medvešek GK
- 2 Aurora Stipanov FP
- 3 Ana Desnica FP
- 4 Jelena Butić FP
- 5 Magdalena Butić FP
- 6 Matea Skelin FP
- 7 Nina Maria Medić FP
- 8 Ria Glas FP
- 9 Lara Srhoj FP
- 10 Iva Rožić FP
- 11 Neli Janković FP
- 12 Nina Jazvin FP
- 13 Natasha Trojan-Jimenez GK
- 14 Roza Pešić FP
- 15 Nina Eterović FP

=== Greece ===
The following is the Greek roster. Head coach: Charis Pavlidis

- 1 Ioanna Stamatopoulou GK
- 2 Eleftheria Plevritou FP
- 3 Foteini Tricha FP
- 4 Stefania Santa FP
- 5 Athina Giannopoulou FP
- 6 Eleni Xenaki FP
- 7 Eirini Ninou FP
- 8 Maria Patra FP
- 9 Christina Siouti FP
- 10 Vasiliki Plevritou FP
- 11 Sofia Tornarou FP
- 12 Maria Myriokefalitaki FP
- 13 Alexia Evgenia Tzourka GK
- 14 Dionysia Koureta FP
- 15 Nefeli Anna Krassa FP

=== Hungary ===
The following is the Hungarian roster.

Head coach: Sándor Cseh / Zoltan David

- 1 Boglárka Neszmély GK
- 2 Dorottya Szilágyi FP
- 3 Vanda Vályi FP
- 4 Eszter Varró FP
- 5 Kinga Peresztegi-Nagy FP
- 6 Nóra Sümegi FP
- 7 Dalma Dömsödi FP
- 8 Rita Keszthelyi FP
- 9 Dóra Leimeter FP
- 10 Natasa Rybanska FP
- 11 Kamilla Faragó FP
- 12 Krisztina Garda FP
- 13 Luca Torma GK
- 14 Panna Tiba FP
- 15 Kata Hajdú FP

=== Japan ===
The following is the Japanese roster.

Head coach: Shota Hazui

- 1 Haruka Inaba GK
- 2 Yumi Arima FP
- 3 Akari Inaba FP
- 4 Eruna Ura FP
- 5 Kako Kawaguchi FP
- 6 Hikaru Shitara FP
- 7 Ai Sunabe FP
- 8 Saya Sekine FP
- 9 Riko Otsubo FP
- 10 Fuka Nishiyama FP
- 11 Momo Inoue FP
- 12 Maho Kobayashi FP
- 13 Manami Noda GK
- 14 Shoka Fukuda FP
- 15 Momone Ninagawa FP

== Group D ==
=== France ===
The following is French roster.

Head coach: Lucas Heurtier

- 1 Pasiphaé Martineaud Peret GK
- 2 Lara Andres FP
- 3 Jade Boughrara FP
- 4 Elhyne Kilic-Pegourie FP
- 5 Erica Hardy FP
- 6 Lily Vernoux FP
- 7 Emma Duflos FP
- 8 Valentine Heurtaux FP
- 9 Ema Vernoux FP
- 10 Lou Jean-Michel FP
- 11 Tiziana Raspo FP
- 12 Camille Radosavljevic FP
- 13 Eszter Lefebvre GK
- 14 Arianna Banchi FP
- 15 Myriam Ouchache FP

=== Great Britain ===
The following is the Britain roster.

Head coach: Jo Mountfield / Theo Nousios

- 1 Sophie Jackson GK
- 2 Anya Clapperton FP
- 3 Amélie Perkins FP
- 4 Cecily Turner FP
- 5 Toula Falvey FP
- 6 Katie Brown FP
- 7 Katy Cutler FP
- 8 Brooke Tafazolli FP
- 9 Katherine Rogers FP
- 10 Amelia Peters FP
- 11 Lucy Blenkinship FP
- 12 Izzy Howe FP
- 13 Cassidy Ball GK
- 14 Harriet Dickens FP

=== South Africa ===
The following is the South African roster.

Head coach: Dean Whyte

- 1 Lucy Davis GK
- 2 Tumi Macdonell FP
- 3 Tia Caswell FP
- 4 Boati Motau FP
- 5 Skye Murray FP
- 6 Mia Loizides FP
- 7 Shakira January FP
- 8 Esihle Zondo FP
- 9 Hannah Weppelman FP
- 10 Jo Williams FP
- 11 Chloe Meecham FP
- 12 Hannah Banks FP
- 13 Kyla Moolman GK
- 14 Georgia Eccles FP

=== Spain ===
The following is the Spanish roster.

Head coach: Jordi Valls

- 1 Mariona Terre Marti GK
- 2 Ariadna Ruiz FP
- 3 Anni Espar FP
- 4 Beatriz Ortiz FP
- 5 Nona Pérez FP
- 6 Paula Crespí FP
- 7 Elena Ruiz FP
- 8 Paula Prats Rodriguez FP
- 9 Daniela Moreno Perez FP
- 10 Paula Camus FP
- 11 Irene González FP
- 12 Paula Leitón FP
- 13 Martina Terré GK
- 14 Carlota Peñalver Granero FP
