= South Korea women's national water polo team =

South Korea
- FINA code: KOR
- Confederation: AASF (Asia)

First international
- Hungary 64–0 South Korea (14 July 2019; Gwangju, South Korea)

Biggest defeat
- Hungary 64–0 South Korea (14 July 2019; Gwangju, South Korea)

World Championship
- Appearances: 1 (first in 2019)
- Best result: 16th (2019)

The South Korea women's national water polo team is the representative for South Korea in international women's water polo. The team has competed in their first World Championship in 2019 as the host nation, where they finished bottom of their group.

== History ==
After qualifying as the host nation for the 2019 World Aquatics Championships, the national team was formed hastily with the national team only being formed in May 2019 as they were drawn to meet Hungary, Canada and Russia. In their opening match, they recorded the biggest defeat in the World Championship history with a 64–0 loss to Hungary as it defeated the Netherlands and South Africa match only hours earlier. After scoring their first goal in a 30–1 defeat to Russia, they finished bottom of the group as they lost to Canada by 20 goals. In the classification stage, they finished in 16th place with a 30 goal loss to Cuba in the fifteenth place playoff sealing their fate.

== Tournaments ==
=== World Championship ===
- 2019 — 16th

=== Asian Games ===
- 2022 – 7th place
- 2026 – Did not participate

=== Asian Championship ===
- 2022 — 6th

== Results ==
#	Opponent	Result
2019 World Water Polo Championships
1	Hungary	0-64 L
2	Russia	1-30 L
3	Canada	2-22 L
4	South Africa	3-26 L
5	Cuba	0-30 L
2022 Asian Water Polo Championship
6	Kazakhstan	5-25 L
7	Japan	3-40 L
8	Thailand	4-32 L
9	Singapore	6-27 L
10	China	1-40 L
11	Singapore	4-18 L
Water polo at the 2022 Asian Games – Women
12	Japan	5-33 L
13	Uzbekistan	8-18 L
14	Singapore	1-24 L
15	Kazakhstan	4-24 L
16	China	3-29 L
17	Thailand	7-20 L

== Summary ==
#	Games	M	W	D	L	GF	GA	GD
1	2019 World Water Polo Championships	5	0	0	5	6	172	-166
2	2022 Asian Water Polo Championship	6	0	0	6	23	182	-159
3	Water polo at the 2022 Asian Games – Women	6	0	0	6	25	148	-123
Total	-	17	0	0	17	54	512	-458
