= Water polo at the 2019 Summer Universiade – Women's tournament =

Women's water polo at the XXX Summer Universiade
- Venue: Piscina Alba Oriens, Casoria; Piscina Felice Scandone, Naples
- Dates: 2–13 July 2019
- Teams: 10

Medalists
1st place, gold medalist(s)		Hungary
2nd place, silver medalist(s)		Italy
3rd place, bronze medalist(s)		Russia

Women's water polo at the 2019 Summer Universiade was held in Casoria and Naples (Italy) from 2 to 13 July 2019. Hungary defeated Italy in the gold-medal final and won the title for the first time.

== Results ==
All times are local (UTC+01:00)

=== Preliminary round ===
==== Group A ====
Team	Pts	Pld	W	D	L	GF	GA	GD
Hungary	12	4	4	0	0	73	22	51
Canada	9	4	3	0	1	50	35	15
Japan	6	4	2	0	2	49	49	=
France	3	4	1	0	2	30	49	–19
Czech Republic	0	4	0	0	4	29	76	–47

2 July 2019; 13:30	Match 1	Hungary	17–3	France	Piscina Alba Oriens (Casoria); Referees: Castrilli (SUI); Radović (SRB)
2 July 2019; 13:30	Match 1	Score by quarters: 5–1, 5–1, 3–1, 4–0			Piscina Alba Oriens (Casoria); Referees: Castrilli (SUI); Radović (SRB)
2 July 2019; 13:30	Match 1	Kövesdi: 4 Tamara Farkas: 3	Goals	Sabouriaut, Bacquet, Deschampt: 1	Piscina Alba Oriens (Casoria); Referees: Castrilli (SUI); Radović (SRB)

2 July 2019; 15:30	Match 2	Canada	12–10	Japan	Piscina Alba Oriens (Casoria); Referees: Bianco (ITA); Dalli (MLT)
2 July 2019; 15:30	Match 2	Score by quarters: 3–3, 3–2, 3–5, 3–0			Piscina Alba Oriens (Casoria); Referees: Bianco (ITA); Dalli (MLT)
2 July 2019; 15:30	Match 2	Guèvremont: 3 Rojas, Massier: 2	Goals	Kazama: 3 Nishiyama: 2	Piscina Alba Oriens (Casoria); Referees: Bianco (ITA); Dalli (MLT)

3 July 2019; 09:30	Match 5	France	10–17	Japan	Piscina Alba Oriens (Casoria); Referees: Castrilli (SUI); Stankevitch (USA)
3 July 2019; 09:30	Match 5	Score by quarters: 1–3, 5–5, 1–4, 3–5			Piscina Alba Oriens (Casoria); Referees: Castrilli (SUI); Stankevitch (USA)
3 July 2019; 09:30	Match 5	Le Roux: 5 Deschampt: 2	Goals	Kazama: 4 Tsunoda: 3	Piscina Alba Oriens (Casoria); Referees: Castrilli (SUI); Stankevitch (USA)

3 July 2019; 11:30	Match 6	Hungary	22–5	Czech Republic	Piscina Alba Oriens (Casoria); Referees: Pang (CHN); Golikin (RUS)
3 July 2019; 11:30	Match 6	Score by quarters: 4–2, 7–2, 4–1, 7–0			Piscina Alba Oriens (Casoria); Referees: Pang (CHN); Golikin (RUS)
3 July 2019; 11:30	Match 6	Máté: 4 Gémes, Huszti, Mucsy: 2	Goals	Šornová, Javůrková: 2 Bušauerová: 1	Piscina Alba Oriens (Casoria); Referees: Pang (CHN); Golikin (RUS)

5 July 2019; 13:30	Match 9	Japan	15–9	Czech Republic	Piscina Alba Oriens (Casoria); Referees: Krizhanovskiy (RUS); Jukes (GBR)
5 July 2019; 13:30	Match 9	Score by quarters: 5–3, 4–1, 2–2, 4–3			Piscina Alba Oriens (Casoria); Referees: Krizhanovskiy (RUS); Jukes (GBR)
5 July 2019; 13:30	Match 9	Nishiyama: 3; 4 players: 2	Goals	K. Hlavatá: 4 Bušauerová: 3	Piscina Alba Oriens (Casoria); Referees: Krizhanovskiy (RUS); Jukes (GBR)

5 July 2019; 15:30	Match 10	France	1–8	Canada	Piscina Alba Oriens (Casoria); Referees: Raković (SRB); Stankevitch (USA)
5 July 2019; 15:30	Match 10	Score by quarters: 0–3, 1–2, 0–1, 0–2			Piscina Alba Oriens (Casoria); Referees: Raković (SRB); Stankevitch (USA)
5 July 2019; 15:30	Match 10	Deschampt: 1	Goals	Lizotte: 2; 6 players: 1	Piscina Alba Oriens (Casoria); Referees: Raković (SRB); Stankevitch (USA)

7 July 2019; 13:30	Match 13	Czech Republic	8–23	Canada	Piscina Alba Oriens (Casoria); Referees: Pang (CHN); Jukes (GBR)
7 July 2019; 13:30	Match 13	Score by quarters: 2–6, 3–5, 1–6, 2–6			Piscina Alba Oriens (Casoria); Referees: Pang (CHN); Jukes (GBR)
7 July 2019; 13:30	Match 13	K. Hlavatá: 4 B. Hlavatá: 2	Goals	Rojas: 5 Allin, Utas: 3	Piscina Alba Oriens (Casoria); Referees: Pang (CHN); Jukes (GBR)

7 July 2019; 15:30	Match 14	Japan	7–18	Hungary	Piscina Alba Oriens (Casoria); Referees: Bianco (ITA); Golikov (RUS)
7 July 2019; 15:30	Match 14	Score by quarters: 2–3, 2–3, 1–5, 2–7			Piscina Alba Oriens (Casoria); Referees: Bianco (ITA); Golikov (RUS)
7 July 2019; 15:30	Match 14	Kazama: 2; 4 players: 1	Goals	Kövesdi, Máté: 3; 4 players: 2	Piscina Alba Oriens (Casoria); Referees: Bianco (ITA); Golikov (RUS)

8 July 2019; 13:30	Match 17	Canada	7–16	Hungary	Piscina Alba Oriens (Casoria); Referees: Krizhanovskiy (RUS); Stankevitch (USA)
8 July 2019; 13:30	Match 17	Score by quarters: 1–4, 1–2, 3–5, 2–5			Piscina Alba Oriens (Casoria); Referees: Krizhanovskiy (RUS); Stankevitch (USA)
8 July 2019; 13:30	Match 17	Allin, Bakoc: 3 Lizotte: 1	Goals	7 players: 2	Piscina Alba Oriens (Casoria); Referees: Krizhanovskiy (RUS); Stankevitch (USA)

8 July 2019; 15:30	Match 18	Czech Republic	7–16	France	Piscina Alba Oriens (Casoria); Referees: Jukes (GBR); Calabro (ITA)
8 July 2019; 15:30	Match 18	Score by quarters: 4–3, 1–5, 1–3, 1–5			Piscina Alba Oriens (Casoria); Referees: Jukes (GBR); Calabro (ITA)
8 July 2019; 15:30	Match 18	K. Hlavatá: 3; 4 players: 1	Goals	Le Roux: 5 Fitaire: 3	Piscina Alba Oriens (Casoria); Referees: Jukes (GBR); Calabro (ITA)

==== Group B ====
Team	Pts	Pld	W	D	L	GF	GA	GD
Italy	12	4	4	0	0	37	31	6
Russia	9	4	3	0	1	52	37	15
Australia	6	4	2	0	2	40	39	1
United States	3	4	1	0	3	38	40	–2
China	0	4	0	0	4	37	57	–20

2 July 2019; 17:30	Match 3	United States	9–10	Russia	Piscina Alba Oriens (Casoria); Referees: Buch (ESP); Matache (ROU)
2 July 2019; 17:30	Match 3	Score by quarters: 1–0, 1–4, 1–3, 6–3			Piscina Alba Oriens (Casoria); Referees: Buch (ESP); Matache (ROU)
2 July 2019; 17:30	Match 3	Hill: 4 Mammolito: 2	Goals	Kempf, Pystina, Inogamova: 2	Piscina Alba Oriens (Casoria); Referees: Buch (ESP); Matache (ROU)

2 July 2019; 19:30	Match 4	Australia	15–4	China	Piscina Alba Oriens (Casoria); Referees: Daskalopoulou (GRE); Fodor (HUN)
2 July 2019; 19:30	Match 4	Score by quarters: 3–4, 4–3, 4–0, 4–1			Piscina Alba Oriens (Casoria); Referees: Daskalopoulou (GRE); Fodor (HUN)
2 July 2019; 19:30	Match 4	Zimmerman, Williams: 3 McClean, Andrews: 2	Goals	4 players: 1	Piscina Alba Oriens (Casoria); Referees: Daskalopoulou (GRE); Fodor (HUN)

4 July 2019; 17:30	Match 7	Russia	17–12	China	Piscina Alba Oriens (Casoria); Referees: Marjay (HUN); Jukes (GBR)
4 July 2019; 17:30	Match 7	Score by quarters: 4–1, 4–4, 5–4, 4–3			Piscina Alba Oriens (Casoria); Referees: Marjay (HUN); Jukes (GBR)
4 July 2019; 17:30	Match 7	Popova, Galimzianova, Mekhteleva: 3 Zaplatina, Chagochkina, Inogamova: 2	Goals	Bi, Li J.: 3 Huang: 2	Piscina Alba Oriens (Casoria); Referees: Marjay (HUN); Jukes (GBR)

4 July 2019; 19:30	Match 8	United States	6–8	Italy	Piscina Alba Oriens (Casoria); Referees: Dalli (MLT); Matache (ROU)
4 July 2019; 19:30	Match 8	Score by quarters: 1–2, 3–3, 1–1, 1–2			Piscina Alba Oriens (Casoria); Referees: Dalli (MLT); Matache (ROU)
4 July 2019; 19:30	Match 8	Mammolito, Tehaney: 2 Weber, Ayala: 1	Goals	Cocchiere: 3 Ranalli, Centanni: 2	Piscina Alba Oriens (Casoria); Referees: Dalli (MLT); Matache (ROU)

5 July 2019; 17:30	Match 11	Russia	17–7	Australia	Piscina Alba Oriens (Casoria); Referees: Daskalopoulou (GRE); Marjay (HUN)
5 July 2019; 17:30	Match 11	Score by quarters: 6–3, 3–0, 5–3, 3–1			Piscina Alba Oriens (Casoria); Referees: Daskalopoulou (GRE); Marjay (HUN)
5 July 2019; 17:30	Match 11	Zaplatina: 5 Inogamova: 4	Goals	Williams: 3	Piscina Alba Oriens (Casoria); Referees: Daskalopoulou (GRE); Marjay (HUN)

5 July 2019; 19:30	Match 12	China	10–11	Italy	Piscina Alba Oriens (Casoria); Referees: Bouchez (FRA); Saito (JPN)
5 July 2019; 19:30	Match 12	Score by quarters: 5–2, 2–3, 1–4, 2–2			Piscina Alba Oriens (Casoria); Referees: Bouchez (FRA); Saito (JPN)
5 July 2019; 19:30	Match 12	Li J., Huang: 4 Yan, Zhai: 1	Goals	Ranalli, Centanni: 4 Cocchiere: 2	Piscina Alba Oriens (Casoria); Referees: Bouchez (FRA); Saito (JPN)

7 July 2019; 17:30	Match 15	China	11–14	United States	Piscina Alba Oriens (Casoria); Referees: Raković (SRB); Bouchez (FRA)
7 July 2019; 17:30	Match 15	Score by quarters: 0–5, 5–3, 4–4, 2–2			Piscina Alba Oriens (Casoria); Referees: Raković (SRB); Bouchez (FRA)
7 July 2019; 17:30	Match 15	Yan: 4 Bi, Meng: 2	Goals	Mammolito, Weber, Ayala: 4	Piscina Alba Oriens (Casoria); Referees: Raković (SRB); Bouchez (FRA)

7 July 2019; 19:30	Match 16	Italy	9–7	Australia	Piscina Alba Oriens (Casoria); Referees: Daskalopoulou (GRE); MacKay (CAN)
7 July 2019; 19:30	Match 16	Score by quarters: 2–1, 2–2, 3–0, 2–4			Piscina Alba Oriens (Casoria); Referees: Daskalopoulou (GRE); MacKay (CAN)
7 July 2019; 19:30	Match 16	Ranalli: 4 Ioannou, Cocchiere: 2	Goals	Williams, Kearns: 2 Morrissey, Milliken, Pontre: 1	Piscina Alba Oriens (Casoria); Referees: Daskalopoulou (GRE); MacKay (CAN)

8 July 2019; 17:30	Match 19	Australia	11–9	United States	Piscina Alba Oriens (Casoria); Referees: Daskalopoulou (GRE); Marjay (HUN)
8 July 2019; 17:30	Match 19	Score by quarters: 3–0, 2–3, 3–3, 3–3			Piscina Alba Oriens (Casoria); Referees: Daskalopoulou (GRE); Marjay (HUN)
8 July 2019; 17:30	Match 19	Kearns: 3 Zimmerman, Pontre: 2	Goals	Prentice, Weber: 2	Piscina Alba Oriens (Casoria); Referees: Daskalopoulou (GRE); Marjay (HUN)

8 July 2019; 19:30	Match 20	Italy	9–8	Russia	Piscina Alba Oriens (Casoria); Referees: Dalli (MLT); Matache (ROU)
8 July 2019; 19:30	Match 20	Score by quarters: 4–2, 3–1, 1–3, 1–2			Piscina Alba Oriens (Casoria); Referees: Dalli (MLT); Matache (ROU)
8 July 2019; 19:30	Match 20	Centanni: 3	Goals	Kempf, Pystina, Chagochkina: 2	Piscina Alba Oriens (Casoria); Referees: Dalli (MLT); Matache (ROU)

=== Knock-out stage ===
==== Brackets ====
- Main bracket

Round of 16
B4	United States	25
A5	Czech Republic	5
A4	France	1
B5	China	12

Quarter-finals
B1	Italy	12
A3	Japan	8
A2	Canada (p)	10
B4	United States	9
A1	Hungary	7
B3	Australia	4
B2	Russia	12
B5	China	8

Semifinals
B1	Italy	15
A2	Canada	7
A1	Hungary (p)	16
B2	Russia	14

Gold Medal final
B1	Italy	7
A1	Hungary	8
Bronze Medal final
A2	Canada	7
B2	Russia	22

- 5th to 8th place bracket

Semifinals
Japan	10
United States	9
Australia	12
China	7

5th place Final
Japan	10
Australia	11
7th place Final
United States	9
China	10

==== Round of 16 ====
9 July 2019; 17:30	Match 21	France	1–12	China	Piscina Alba Oriens (Casoria); Referees: Kohout (CZE); Peila (USA)
9 July 2019; 17:30	Match 21	Score by quarters: 1–1, 0–4, 0–2, 0–5			Piscina Alba Oriens (Casoria); Referees: Kohout (CZE); Peila (USA)
9 July 2019; 17:30	Match 21	Deschampt: 1	Goals	Bi, Huang: 3 Li Z.: 2	Piscina Alba Oriens (Casoria); Referees: Kohout (CZE); Peila (USA)

9 July 2019; 19:30	Match 22	United States	25–5	Czech Republic	Piscina Alba Oriens (Casoria); Referees: Raković (SRB); Saito (JPN)
9 July 2019; 19:30	Match 22	Score by quarters: 5–0, 10–0, 5–1, 5–3			Piscina Alba Oriens (Casoria); Referees: Raković (SRB); Saito (JPN)
9 July 2019; 19:30	Match 22	Weber: 8 Smith, Johnson: 3	Goals	K. Hlavatá: 4 B. Hlavatá: 1	Piscina Alba Oriens (Casoria); Referees: Raković (SRB); Saito (JPN)

==== Quarter-finals ====
10 July 2019; 13:30	Match 24	Canada	10–9 (p)	United States	Piscina Alba Oriens (Casoria); Referees: Dalli (MLT); Matache (ROU)
10 July 2019; 13:30	Match 24	Score by quarters: 1–2, 2–2, 1–1, 1–0			Piscina Alba Oriens (Casoria); Referees: Dalli (MLT); Matache (ROU)
10 July 2019; 13:30	Match 24	5 players: 1: x	Goals	Hill: 2 Johnson, Mammolito, Ayala: 1	Piscina Alba Oriens (Casoria); Referees: Dalli (MLT); Matache (ROU)

10 July 2019; 15:30	Match 25	Hungary	7–4	Australia	Piscina Alba Oriens (Casoria); Referees: Colikov (RUS); Stankevitch (USA)
10 July 2019; 15:30	Match 25	Score by quarters: 0–2, 1–1, 3–1, 3–0			Piscina Alba Oriens (Casoria); Referees: Colikov (RUS); Stankevitch (USA)
10 July 2019; 15:30	Match 25	Garda: 4 Farkas, Kövesdi, Gémes: 1	Goals	Kearns: 2 McClean, Milliken: 1	Piscina Alba Oriens (Casoria); Referees: Colikov (RUS); Stankevitch (USA)

10 July 2019; 17:30	Match 26	Russia	12–8	China	Piscina Alba Oriens (Casoria); Referees: Bouchez (FRA); Bianco (ITA)
10 July 2019; 17:30	Match 26	Score by quarters: 4–2, 4–1, 3–3, 1–2			Piscina Alba Oriens (Casoria); Referees: Bouchez (FRA); Bianco (ITA)
10 July 2019; 17:30	Match 26	Pystina: 5 Kempf: 3	Goals	Bi: 3 Nong: 2	Piscina Alba Oriens (Casoria); Referees: Bouchez (FRA); Bianco (ITA)

10 July 2019; 19:30	Match 23	Italy	12–8	Japan	Piscina Alba Oriens (Casoria); Referees: Daskalopoulou (GRE); Fodor (HUN)
10 July 2019; 19:30	Match 23	Score by quarters: 2–2, 5–1, 3–2, 2–3			Piscina Alba Oriens (Casoria); Referees: Daskalopoulou (GRE); Fodor (HUN)
10 July 2019; 19:30	Match 23	Gottardo, Cocchiere: 3 Ranalli: 2	Goals	Hasumi: 3 Kazama: 2	Piscina Alba Oriens (Casoria); Referees: Daskalopoulou (GRE); Fodor (HUN)

==== Semifinals ====
12 July 2019; 18:00	Match 32	Italy	15–7	Canada	Piscina Felice Scandone (Naples); Referees: Daskalopoulou (GRE); Matache (ROU)
12 July 2019; 18:00	Match 32	Score by quarters: 4–2, 7–1, 2–2, 2–2			Piscina Felice Scandone (Naples); Referees: Daskalopoulou (GRE); Matache (ROU)
12 July 2019; 18:00	Match 32	Gottardo, Ranalli, Cocchiere: 3 Repetto, Centanni: 2	Goals	Guèvremont: 3 Utas: 2	Piscina Felice Scandone (Naples); Referees: Daskalopoulou (GRE); Matache (ROU)

12 July 2019; 20:00	Match 33	Hungary	16–14 (p) (PSO)	Russia	Piscina Felice Scandone (Naples); Referees: Dalli (MLT); Buch (ESP)
12 July 2019; 20:00	Match 33	Score by quarters: 4–5, 4–3, 1–0, 3–4 PSO: 4–2			Piscina Felice Scandone (Naples); Referees: Dalli (MLT); Buch (ESP)
12 July 2019; 20:00	Match 33	Garda, Máthé: 3 Kövesdi: 2	Goals	Chagochkina: 4 Zaplatina, Pystina: 3	Piscina Felice Scandone (Naples); Referees: Dalli (MLT); Buch (ESP)

- 5th to 8th place

11 July 2019; 17:30	Match 27	Japan	10–9	United States	Piscina Alba Oriens (Casoria); Referees: Pang (CHN); Jukes (GBR)
11 July 2019; 17:30	Match 27	Score by quarters: 6–4, 2–1, 0–1, 2–3			Piscina Alba Oriens (Casoria); Referees: Pang (CHN); Jukes (GBR)
11 July 2019; 17:30	Match 27	Nishiyama: 4 Kazama, Tsunoda: 2	Goals	Hill: 5 Ava Johnson: 2	Piscina Alba Oriens (Casoria); Referees: Pang (CHN); Jukes (GBR)

11 July 2019; 19:30	Match 28	Australia	12–7	China	Piscina Alba Oriens (Casoria); Referees: Bouchez (FRA); Raković (SRB)
11 July 2019; 19:30	Match 28	Score by quarters: 3–1, 2–2, 4–0, 3–4			Piscina Alba Oriens (Casoria); Referees: Bouchez (FRA); Raković (SRB)
11 July 2019; 19:30	Match 28	McClean, Williams: 3 Andrews, Kearns: 2	Goals	Nong, Zhai: 2	Piscina Alba Oriens (Casoria); Referees: Bouchez (FRA); Raković (SRB)

==== Finals ====
- 9th/10th place match

11 July 2019; 15:30	Match 29	Czech Republic	10–22	France	Piscina Alba Oriens (Casoria); Referees: Calabro (ITA); Saito (JPN)
11 July 2019; 15:30	Match 29	Score by quarters: 2–7, 1–3, 3–6, 4–6			Piscina Alba Oriens (Casoria); Referees: Calabro (ITA); Saito (JPN)
11 July 2019; 15:30	Match 29	Bušauerová: 4 B. Hlavatá: 2	Goals	Le Roux, Deschampt: 7 Bacquet: 4	Piscina Alba Oriens (Casoria); Referees: Calabro (ITA); Saito (JPN)

- 7th/8th place match

12 July 2019; 09:30	Match 30	United States	9–10	China	Piscina Felice Scandone (Naples); Referees: Ogino (JPN); Raković (SRB)
12 July 2019; 09:30	Match 30	Score by quarters: 0–5, 3–4, 3–1, 3–0			Piscina Felice Scandone (Naples); Referees: Ogino (JPN); Raković (SRB)
12 July 2019; 09:30	Match 30	Fitzgerald, Weber: 2	Goals	Huang: 5 Yan: 3	Piscina Felice Scandone (Naples); Referees: Ogino (JPN); Raković (SRB)

- 5th/6th place match

12 July 2019; 11:30	Match 31	Japan	10–11	Australia	Piscina Felice Scandone (Naples); Referees: Corbin (FRA); Kohout (CZE)
12 July 2019; 11:30	Match 31	Score by quarters: 2–2, 4–1, 1–4, 3–4			Piscina Felice Scandone (Naples); Referees: Corbin (FRA); Kohout (CZE)
12 July 2019; 11:30	Match 31	Nishiyama: 4 Kazama: 3	Goals	Zimmerman, Kearns: 3 McClean, Williams: 2	Piscina Felice Scandone (Naples); Referees: Corbin (FRA); Kohout (CZE)

- Bronze medal match

13 July 2019; 18:00	Match 34	Canada	7–22	Russia	Piscina Felice Scandone (Naples); Referees: Bianco (ITA); Marjay (HUN)
13 July 2019; 18:00	Match 34	Score by quarters: 1–7, 1–3, 4–7, 1–5			Piscina Felice Scandone (Naples); Referees: Bianco (ITA); Marjay (HUN)
13 July 2019; 18:00	Match 34	Rojas: 3; 4 players: 1	Goals	Kempf: 8 Imoganova: 4 Galimzianova: 3	Piscina Felice Scandone (Naples); Referees: Bianco (ITA); Marjay (HUN)

- Gold medal match

13 July 2019; 20:00	Match 35	Italy	7–8	Hungary	Piscina Felice Scandone (Naples); Referees: Daskalopoulou (GRE); Raković (SRB)
13 July 2019; 20:00	Match 35	Score by quarters: 3–3, 1–2, 1–2, 2–1			Piscina Felice Scandone (Naples); Referees: Daskalopoulou (GRE); Raković (SRB)
13 July 2019; 20:00	Match 35	Millo, Centanni, Cocchiere: 2 Storai: 1	Goals	Garda: 3 Hertzka, Gémes: 2	Piscina Felice Scandone (Naples); Referees: Daskalopoulou (GRE); Raković (SRB)

== Final standing ==
Rank	Team
1st place, gold medalist(s)	Hungary
2nd place, silver medalist(s)	Italy
3rd place, bronze medalist(s)	Russia
4	Canada
5	Australia
6	Japan
7	China
8	United States
9	France
10	Czech Republic

== Top scorers ==
Overall standing

Rank	Player	Goals
1	(United States) Bayley Weber	19
2	(China) Huang Jiayu	17
2	(Japan) Yuri Kazama	17
2	(Russia) Polina Kempf	17
2	(France) Morgane Le Roux	17
2	(Japan) Fuka Nishiyama	17
7	(Italy) Agnese Cocchiere	16
7	(Hungary) Krisztina Garda	16
7	(Czech Republic) Karolína Hlavatá	16
7	(Russia) Margarita Pystina	16
7	(Italy) Chiara Ranalli	16
