= Water polo at the 2026 Asian Games – Women's tournament =

Water polo tournament

Women's water polo at the 2026 Asian Games
- Venues: Nippon Gaishi Hall Rainbow Pool
- Dates: 20–24 September 2026
- Competitors: 90 from 6 nations

Medalists
gold medal	China
silver medal	Japan
bronze medal	Thailand

The women's tournament of water polo at the 2026 Asian Games in Nagoya, Japan was held from 20 to 24 September 2026.

== Squads ==
China	Japan	Kazakhstan	Singapore
Du Xinyue; Zhang Yumian; Yan Jing; Zhou Shang; Xie Liyi; Wang Shiyun; Shao Yixin; Chen Jiaqing; Yan Siya; Nong Sanfeng; Zhang Qishuo; Wang Xuan; Shen Yineng; Zhang Jingwen; Zou Yuhe	Haruka Inaba; Yumi Arima; Akari Inaba; Eruna Ura; Kako Kawaguchi; Hikaru Shitara; Ai Sunabe; Saya Sekine; Riko Otsubo; Fuka Nishiyama; Momo Inoue; Maho Kobayashi; Manami Noda; Nina Lowrey; Shoka Fukuda	Alexandra Zharkimbayeva; Darya Pochinok; Yuliya Druzhinina; Viktoriya Kaplun; Valeriya Anossova; Madina Rakhmanova; Anna Novikova; Olga Vorontsova; Milena Nabiyeva; Yelizaveta Rudneva; Anastassiya Mirshina; Anastassiya Tsoy; Mariya Martynenko; Alina Ozkaya; Kamila Nauryzbayeva	Mounisha Devi Manivannan; Tio Ji Suan Charlene; Zhu Zhiyun; Kayla Yeo Ying Xuan; Ong Jia Hui Juni; Lim Wan Jun Nicole Kristen; Abielle Yeo Zhi Min; Heather Lee Xuan Hui; Gan Huimin; Ong Xuan Rong Rochelle; Loh Yu Xuan; Lim Li Jun Ariel Charis; Megan Cho Jit; Sophie Ong Shu En; Ong Zi Rui Ricci
Thailand	Uzbekistan		
Phanthila Arsayuth; Thanidakarn Kwantongtanaree; Panita Pukkamman; Janista Thinwilai; Paranee Chotrotchanaan; Thanita Kongchouy; Kritsana Puangtong; Nattamon Khamma; Raksina Rueangsappaisan; Sarocha Rueangsappaisan; Pittayaporn Kwantongtanaree; Pimpin Ngamcharoensuktaworn; Nareenun Kittipolpuwarag; Kanruetai Riangsuntea; Panchita Rodwattanadisakul	Veronika Gergel; Elena Gavashelashvili; Khilola Yusupova; Polina Fomicheva; Aziza Salamatova; Aleksa Verklova; Makhpal Asilbekova; Sofiya Andriyakhina; Amilya Gabzalilova; Komila Murtazaeva; Alisa Markova; Sofiya Talina; Aziza Azizova; Khusniyabonu Abdullaeva; Evgeniya Kiseleva		

== Results ==
All times are local, Japan Standard Time (UTC+9).

Pos	Team	Pld	W	PSW	PSL	L	GF	GA	GD	Pts
1st place, gold medalist(s)	China	5	4	1	0	0	113	35	+78	14
2nd place, silver medalist(s)	Japan (H)	5	4	0	1	0	119	48	+71	13
3rd place, bronze medalist(s)	Thailand	5	2	0	1	2	51	78	−27	7
4	Kazakhstan	5	1	1	1	2	43	69	−26	6
5	Uzbekistan	5	1	1	0	3	47	93	−46	5
6	Singapore	5	0	0	0	5	39	89	−50	0

Source: Aichi–Nagoya 2026
(H) Host

20 September 2026; 14:30	Report	Japan	28–7	Thailand	Nippon Gaishi Hall Rainbow Pool, Nagoya; Referees: Alessia Ferrari (ITA), David Gómez (ESP)
20 September 2026; 14:30	Report	Score by quarters: 7–2, 7–2, 8–1, 6–2			Nippon Gaishi Hall Rainbow Pool, Nagoya; Referees: Alessia Ferrari (ITA), David Gómez (ESP)
20 September 2026; 14:30	Report	Lowrey, Ura 4	Goals	Puangtong, R. Rueangsappaisan 2	Nippon Gaishi Hall Rainbow Pool, Nagoya; Referees: Alessia Ferrari (ITA), David Gómez (ESP)

20 September 2026; 16:05	Report	Singapore	7–12	Kazakhstan	Nippon Gaishi Hall Rainbow Pool, Nagoya; Referees: Li Meichunzi (CHN), Aussawin Wajangam (THA)
20 September 2026; 16:05	Report	Score by quarters: 2–2, 1–3, 3–4, 1–3			Nippon Gaishi Hall Rainbow Pool, Nagoya; Referees: Li Meichunzi (CHN), Aussawin Wajangam (THA)
20 September 2026; 16:05	Report	Lee, K. Yeo 2	Goals	Mirshina, Vorontsova 4	Nippon Gaishi Hall Rainbow Pool, Nagoya; Referees: Li Meichunzi (CHN), Aussawin Wajangam (THA)

20 September 2026; 17:40	Report	China	32–6	Uzbekistan	Nippon Gaishi Hall Rainbow Pool, Nagoya; Referees: Viktor Salnichenko (KAZ), Jeremy Cheng (SGP)
20 September 2026; 17:40	Report	Score by quarters: 8–1, 9–2, 8–3, 7–0			Nippon Gaishi Hall Rainbow Pool, Nagoya; Referees: Viktor Salnichenko (KAZ), Jeremy Cheng (SGP)
20 September 2026; 17:40	Report	Zhang Y. 6	Goals	six players 1	Nippon Gaishi Hall Rainbow Pool, Nagoya; Referees: Viktor Salnichenko (KAZ), Jeremy Cheng (SGP)

21 September 2026; 14:30	Report	Singapore	10–13	Uzbekistan	Nippon Gaishi Hall Rainbow Pool, Nagoya; Referees: Alessia Ferrari (ITA), Chisato Kurosaki (JPN)
21 September 2026; 14:30	Report	Score by quarters: 2–5, 3–2, 3–2, 2–4			Nippon Gaishi Hall Rainbow Pool, Nagoya; Referees: Alessia Ferrari (ITA), Chisato Kurosaki (JPN)
21 September 2026; 14:30	Report	A. Yeo, Zhu 3	Goals	three players 3	Nippon Gaishi Hall Rainbow Pool, Nagoya; Referees: Alessia Ferrari (ITA), Chisato Kurosaki (JPN)

21 September 2026; 16:05	Report	Thailand	6–21	China	Nippon Gaishi Hall Rainbow Pool, Nagoya; Referees: Andrej Franulović (CRO), Viktoriya Markova (UZB)
21 September 2026; 16:05	Report	Score by quarters: 1–7, 1–3, 2–6, 2–5			Nippon Gaishi Hall Rainbow Pool, Nagoya; Referees: Andrej Franulović (CRO), Viktoriya Markova (UZB)
21 September 2026; 16:05	Report	six players 1	Goals	Zhang Y. 5	Nippon Gaishi Hall Rainbow Pool, Nagoya; Referees: Andrej Franulović (CRO), Viktoriya Markova (UZB)

21 September 2026; 17:40	Report	Kazakhstan	10–25	Japan	Nippon Gaishi Hall Rainbow Pool, Nagoya; Referees: Georgios Stavridis (GRE), Jeremy Cheng (SGP)
21 September 2026; 17:40	Report	Score by quarters: 2–4, 2–9, 2–4, 4–8			Nippon Gaishi Hall Rainbow Pool, Nagoya; Referees: Georgios Stavridis (GRE), Jeremy Cheng (SGP)
21 September 2026; 17:40	Report	Mirshina 5	Goals	Arima, Kobayashi 4	Nippon Gaishi Hall Rainbow Pool, Nagoya; Referees: Georgios Stavridis (GRE), Jeremy Cheng (SGP)

22 September 2026; 14:30	Report	Kazakhstan	10–10; PSO: 4–3	Thailand	Nippon Gaishi Hall Rainbow Pool, Nagoya; Referees: Andrej Franulović (CRO), David Gómez (ESP)
22 September 2026; 14:30	Report	Score by quarters: 2–3, 1–4, 5–2, 2–1			Nippon Gaishi Hall Rainbow Pool, Nagoya; Referees: Andrej Franulović (CRO), David Gómez (ESP)
22 September 2026; 14:30	Report	Druzhinina, Mirshina 3	Goals	R. Rueangsappaisan 3	Nippon Gaishi Hall Rainbow Pool, Nagoya; Referees: Andrej Franulović (CRO), David Gómez (ESP)

22 September 2026; 16:05	Report	Singapore	6–27	China	Nippon Gaishi Hall Rainbow Pool, Nagoya; Referees: Georgios Stavridis (GRE), Viktoriya Markova (UZB)
22 September 2026; 16:05	Report	Score by quarters: 1–8, 2–6, 2–5, 1–8			Nippon Gaishi Hall Rainbow Pool, Nagoya; Referees: Georgios Stavridis (GRE), Viktoriya Markova (UZB)
22 September 2026; 16:05	Report	Lee 3	Goals	Zhang Q. 5	Nippon Gaishi Hall Rainbow Pool, Nagoya; Referees: Georgios Stavridis (GRE), Viktoriya Markova (UZB)

22 September 2026; 17:40	Report	Japan	27–10	Uzbekistan	Nippon Gaishi Hall Rainbow Pool, Nagoya; Referees: Viktor Salnichenko (KAZ), Li Meichunzi (CHN)
22 September 2026; 17:40	Report	Score by quarters: 8–1, 7–4, 7–2, 5–3			Nippon Gaishi Hall Rainbow Pool, Nagoya; Referees: Viktor Salnichenko (KAZ), Li Meichunzi (CHN)
22 September 2026; 17:40	Report	Ura 5	Goals	Gavashelashvili 3	Nippon Gaishi Hall Rainbow Pool, Nagoya; Referees: Viktor Salnichenko (KAZ), Li Meichunzi (CHN)

23 September 2026; 14:30	Report	Uzbekistan	10–16	Thailand	Nippon Gaishi Hall Rainbow Pool, Nagoya; Referees: Alessia Ferrari (ITA), Jeremy Cheng (SGP)
23 September 2026; 14:30	Report	Score by quarters: 2–1, 3–5, 3–5, 2–5			Nippon Gaishi Hall Rainbow Pool, Nagoya; Referees: Alessia Ferrari (ITA), Jeremy Cheng (SGP)
23 September 2026; 14:30	Report	Gavashelashvili 4	Goals	R. Rueangsappaisan 5	Nippon Gaishi Hall Rainbow Pool, Nagoya; Referees: Alessia Ferrari (ITA), Jeremy Cheng (SGP)

23 September 2026; 16:05	Report	China	19–3	Kazakhstan	Nippon Gaishi Hall Rainbow Pool, Nagoya; Referees: Andrej Franulović (CRO), Chisato Kurosaki (JPN)
23 September 2026; 16:05	Report	Score by quarters: 6–2, 3–0, 3–0, 7–1			Nippon Gaishi Hall Rainbow Pool, Nagoya; Referees: Andrej Franulović (CRO), Chisato Kurosaki (JPN)
23 September 2026; 16:05	Report	Shao 4	Goals	Mirshina 2	Nippon Gaishi Hall Rainbow Pool, Nagoya; Referees: Andrej Franulović (CRO), Chisato Kurosaki (JPN)

23 September 2026; 17:40	Report	Japan	25–7	Singapore	Nippon Gaishi Hall Rainbow Pool, Nagoya; Referees: Viktoriya Markova (UZB), Aussawin Wajangam (THA)
23 September 2026; 17:40	Report	Score by quarters: 9–2, 6–3, 5–1, 5–1			Nippon Gaishi Hall Rainbow Pool, Nagoya; Referees: Viktoriya Markova (UZB), Aussawin Wajangam (THA)
23 September 2026; 17:40	Report	Fukuda 4	Goals	Lee 3	Nippon Gaishi Hall Rainbow Pool, Nagoya; Referees: Viktoriya Markova (UZB), Aussawin Wajangam (THA)

24 September 2026; 15:45	Report	Uzbekistan	8–8; PSO: 6–5	Kazakhstan	Nippon Gaishi Hall Rainbow Pool, Nagoya; Referees: David Gómez (ESP), Li Meichunzi (CHN)
24 September 2026; 15:45	Report	Score by quarters: 1–2, 0–1, 3–2, 4–3			Nippon Gaishi Hall Rainbow Pool, Nagoya; Referees: David Gómez (ESP), Li Meichunzi (CHN)
24 September 2026; 15:45	Report	Murtazaeva 3	Goals	three players 2	Nippon Gaishi Hall Rainbow Pool, Nagoya; Referees: David Gómez (ESP), Li Meichunzi (CHN)

24 September 2026; 17:20	Report	Thailand	12–9	Singapore	Nippon Gaishi Hall Rainbow Pool, Nagoya; Referees: Viktor Salnichenko (KAZ), Chisato Kurosaki (JPN)
24 September 2026; 17:20	Report	Score by quarters: 2–1, 4–2, 4–4, 2–2			Nippon Gaishi Hall Rainbow Pool, Nagoya; Referees: Viktor Salnichenko (KAZ), Chisato Kurosaki (JPN)
24 September 2026; 17:20	Report	R. Rueangsappaisan 3	Goals	Lee 6	Nippon Gaishi Hall Rainbow Pool, Nagoya; Referees: Viktor Salnichenko (KAZ), Chisato Kurosaki (JPN)

24 September 2026; 18:55	Report	China	14–14; PSO: 5–4	Japan	Nippon Gaishi Hall Rainbow Pool, Nagoya; Referees: Georgios Stavridis (GRE), Alessia Ferrari (ITA)
24 September 2026; 18:55	Report	Score by quarters: 6–2, 4–5, 3–5, 1–2			Nippon Gaishi Hall Rainbow Pool, Nagoya; Referees: Georgios Stavridis (GRE), Alessia Ferrari (ITA)
24 September 2026; 18:55	Report	Zhang Q. 4	Goals	Inaba 4	Nippon Gaishi Hall Rainbow Pool, Nagoya; Referees: Georgios Stavridis (GRE), Alessia Ferrari (ITA)

== Final standing ==
Rank	Team	Pld	W	PW	PL	L
1st place, gold medalist(s)	China	5	4	1	0	0
2nd place, silver medalist(s)	Japan	5	4	0	1	0
3rd place, bronze medalist(s)	Thailand	5	2	0	1	2
4	Kazakhstan	5	1	1	1	2
5	Uzbekistan	5	1	1	0	3
6	Singapore	5	0	0	0	5
