= Water polo at the 2018 Asian Games – Women's tournament =

Women at the 2018 Asian Games
- Venue: Gelora Bung Karno Aquatic Stadium
- Date: 16–21 August 2018
- Competitors: 78 from 6 nations

Medalists
gold medal	China
silver medal	Kazakhstan
bronze medal	Japan

The women's tournament of Water polo at the 2018 Asian Games in Jakarta, Indonesia, began on 16 August and ended on 21 August 2018. All games were held at the Gelora Bung Karno Aquatic Stadium.

After the cancelation of the 2020 Asian Water Polo Championships, the Asian Games acted as the Asian qualifying tournament for the 2020 Olympic Games in Tokyo.

== Squads ==
China	Hong Kong	Indonesia	Japan
Peng Lin; Zhai Ying; Mei Xiaohan; Xiong Dunhan; Niu Guannan; Guo Ning; Nong Sanfeng; Zhang Cong; Wang Huan; Zhang Danyi; Chen Xiao; Zhang Jing; Shen Yineng	Li Ho In; Chan Sze Ting; So Ting Yuet; Cheng Ka Yan; Ng Wai Yiu; Lau Kwan Ling; Lau Tsz Ching; Yeung Sze Wai; Mak Lee Sze; Lo Ka Man; Zada Yeung; Leung Nga Gwen; Cindy Ho	Ayudya Suidarwanty Pratiwi; Sarah Manzilina; Alya Nadira Trifiansyah; Hanna Firdaus; Ivy Nernie Priscilla; Nyoman Ayu Savitri; Upiet Sarimanah; Ariel Dyah Cininta Siwabessy; Glindra Patricia Legawa; Febrika Indirawati; Rani Raida; Siti Balkis; Dinda Nur Asmarandana	Minami Shioya; Yumi Arima; Akari Inaba; Shino Magariyama; Chiaki Sakanoue; Minori Yamamoto; Maiko Hashida; Yuki Niizawa; Kana Hosoya; Misaki Noro; Marina Tokumoto; Kotori Suzuki; Miyuu Aoki
Kazakhstan	Thailand		
Alexandra Zharkimbayeva; Oxana Saichuk; Aizhan Akilbayeva; Anna Turova; Anastassiya Yeremina; Darya Roga; Anna Novikova; Sivilya Raiter; Shakhzoda Mansurova; Zamira Myrzabekova; Anastassiya Mirshina; Anastassiya Murataliyeva; Azhar Alibayeva	Rungravee Jangjai; Kaithip Saeteaw; Issaree Turon; Janista Thinwilai; Thitirat Somyos; Poonnada Rotchanarut; Nirawan Chompoopuen; Varistha Saraikarn; Rojnaree Taweechai; Sarocha Rewrujirek; Arisara Minsri; Alwani Sathitanon; Khemasiri Sirivejjabandh		

== Results ==
All times are Western Indonesia Time (UTC+07:00)

Pos	Team	Pld	W	D	L	GF	GA	GD	Pts
1	China	5	5	0	0	76	24	+52	10
2	Kazakhstan	5	4	0	1	70	34	+36	8
3	Japan	5	3	0	2	84	36	+48	6
4	Thailand	5	2	0	3	53	62	−9	4
5	Indonesia	5	1	0	4	30	82	−52	2
6	Hong Kong	5	0	0	5	22	97	−75	0

Source: OCA

16 August; 14:30	Japan	15–4	Indonesia	Gelora Bung Karno Aquatic Stadium, Jakarta; Referees: Štampalija (CRO), Tan (SGP)
16 August; 14:30	Score by quarters: 5–2, 2–1, 3–0, 5–1			Gelora Bung Karno Aquatic Stadium, Jakarta; Referees: Štampalija (CRO), Tan (SGP)
16 August; 14:30	Sakanoue 4	Goals	four players 1	Gelora Bung Karno Aquatic Stadium, Jakarta; Referees: Štampalija (CRO), Tan (SGP)

16 August; 15:50	Thailand	19–6	Hong Kong	Gelora Bung Karno Aquatic Stadium, Jakarta; Referees: Flahive (AUS), Ni (CHN)
16 August; 15:50	Score by quarters: 5–1, 3–3, 8–0, 3–2			Gelora Bung Karno Aquatic Stadium, Jakarta; Referees: Flahive (AUS), Ni (CHN)
16 August; 15:50	Saraikarn 5	Goals	Mak 3	Gelora Bung Karno Aquatic Stadium, Jakarta; Referees: Flahive (AUS), Ni (CHN)

16 August; 17:10	China	11–4	Kazakhstan	Gelora Bung Karno Aquatic Stadium, Jakarta; Referees: Stavridis (GRE), Štampalija (CRO)
16 August; 17:10	Score by quarters: 3–1, 4–1, 2–1, 2–1			Gelora Bung Karno Aquatic Stadium, Jakarta; Referees: Stavridis (GRE), Štampalija (CRO)
16 August; 17:10	Xiong, Zhang J. 2	Goals	Roga 2	Gelora Bung Karno Aquatic Stadium, Jakarta; Referees: Stavridis (GRE), Štampalija (CRO)

17 August; 14:30	Indonesia	9–8	Hong Kong	Gelora Bung Karno Aquatic Stadium, Jakarta; Referees: Tahara (JPN), Salnichenko (KAZ)
17 August; 14:30	Score by quarters: 1–3, 1–2, 1–1, 6–2			Gelora Bung Karno Aquatic Stadium, Jakarta; Referees: Tahara (JPN), Salnichenko (KAZ)
17 August; 14:30	Savitri, Siwabessy, Legawa 2	Goals	Chan, Mak 4	Gelora Bung Karno Aquatic Stadium, Jakarta; Referees: Tahara (JPN), Salnichenko (KAZ)

17 August; 15:50	Kazakhstan	13–4	Thailand	Gelora Bung Karno Aquatic Stadium, Jakarta; Referees: Tan (SGP), Štampalija (CRO)
17 August; 15:50	Score by quarters: 3–3, 2–1, 6–0, 2–0			Gelora Bung Karno Aquatic Stadium, Jakarta; Referees: Tan (SGP), Štampalija (CRO)
17 August; 15:50	Mirshina 5	Goals	four players 1	Gelora Bung Karno Aquatic Stadium, Jakarta; Referees: Tan (SGP), Štampalija (CRO)

17 August; 17:10	Japan	8–12	China	Gelora Bung Karno Aquatic Stadium, Jakarta; Referees: Flahive (AUS), Stavridis (GRE)
17 August; 17:10	Score by quarters: 0–3, 1–3, 3–2, 4–4			Gelora Bung Karno Aquatic Stadium, Jakarta; Referees: Flahive (AUS), Stavridis (GRE)
17 August; 17:10	four players 2	Goals	Xiong, Zhang J. 3	Gelora Bung Karno Aquatic Stadium, Jakarta; Referees: Flahive (AUS), Stavridis (GRE)

19 August; 14:30	Hong Kong	2–22	Kazakhstan	Gelora Bung Karno Aquatic Stadium, Jakarta; Referees: Pranolo (INA), Tan (SGP)
19 August; 14:30	Score by quarters: 0–7, 1–3, 1–7, 0–5			Gelora Bung Karno Aquatic Stadium, Jakarta; Referees: Pranolo (INA), Tan (SGP)
19 August; 14:30	Chan, Leung 1	Goals	Novikova, Myrzabekova 4	Gelora Bung Karno Aquatic Stadium, Jakarta; Referees: Pranolo (INA), Tan (SGP)

19 August; 15:50	China	20–4	Indonesia	Gelora Bung Karno Aquatic Stadium, Jakarta; Referees: Jiathornwattana (THA), Salnichenko (KAZ)
19 August; 15:50	Score by quarters: 7–0, 7–3, 3–1, 3–0			Gelora Bung Karno Aquatic Stadium, Jakarta; Referees: Jiathornwattana (THA), Salnichenko (KAZ)
19 August; 15:50	Xiong, Zhang D., Chen 3	Goals	Siwabessy 2	Gelora Bung Karno Aquatic Stadium, Jakarta; Referees: Jiathornwattana (THA), Salnichenko (KAZ)

19 August; 17:10	Thailand	5–19	Japan	Gelora Bung Karno Aquatic Stadium, Jakarta; Referees: Han (KOR), Ni (CHN)
19 August; 17:10	Score by quarters: 2–7, 0–2, 0–6, 3–4			Gelora Bung Karno Aquatic Stadium, Jakarta; Referees: Han (KOR), Ni (CHN)
19 August; 17:10	Sathitanon 2	Goals	Arima, Inaba 5	Gelora Bung Karno Aquatic Stadium, Jakarta; Referees: Han (KOR), Ni (CHN)

20 August; 14:30	Indonesia	6–19	Kazakhstan	Gelora Bung Karno Aquatic Stadium, Jakarta; Referees: Tahara (JPN), Ni (CHN)
20 August; 14:30	Score by quarters: 0–5, 0–2, 2–7, 4–5			Gelora Bung Karno Aquatic Stadium, Jakarta; Referees: Tahara (JPN), Ni (CHN)
20 August; 14:30	Manzilina 2	Goals	Mirshina 5	Gelora Bung Karno Aquatic Stadium, Jakarta; Referees: Tahara (JPN), Ni (CHN)

20 August; 15:50	Japan	31–3	Hong Kong	Gelora Bung Karno Aquatic Stadium, Jakarta; Referees: Jiathornwattana (THA), Salnichenko (KAZ)
20 August; 15:50	Score by quarters: 8–2, 5–0, 12–0, 6–1			Gelora Bung Karno Aquatic Stadium, Jakarta; Referees: Jiathornwattana (THA), Salnichenko (KAZ)
20 August; 15:50	Arima 7	Goals	Chan, Ng, Yeung S. 1	Gelora Bung Karno Aquatic Stadium, Jakarta; Referees: Jiathornwattana (THA), Salnichenko (KAZ)

20 August; 17:10	China	17–5	Thailand	Gelora Bung Karno Aquatic Stadium, Jakarta; Referees: Tan (SGP), Pranolo (INA)
20 August; 17:10	Score by quarters: 3–0, 5–2, 6–1, 3–2			Gelora Bung Karno Aquatic Stadium, Jakarta; Referees: Tan (SGP), Pranolo (INA)
20 August; 17:10	Chen X. 5	Goals	Rewrujirek 2	Gelora Bung Karno Aquatic Stadium, Jakarta; Referees: Tan (SGP), Pranolo (INA)

21 August; 14:30	Thailand	20–7	Indonesia	Gelora Bung Karno Aquatic Stadium, Jakarta; Referees: Ni (CHN), Flahive (AUS)
21 August; 14:30	Score by quarters: 5–1, 3–1, 8–2, 4–3			Gelora Bung Karno Aquatic Stadium, Jakarta; Referees: Ni (CHN), Flahive (AUS)
21 August; 14:30	Thinwilai 7	Goals	Balkis 2	Gelora Bung Karno Aquatic Stadium, Jakarta; Referees: Ni (CHN), Flahive (AUS)

21 August; 15:50	Hong Kong	3–16	China	Gelora Bung Karno Aquatic Stadium, Jakarta; Referees: Tahara (JPN), Han (KOR)
21 August; 15:50	Score by quarters: 1–4, 0–4, 0–4, 2–4			Gelora Bung Karno Aquatic Stadium, Jakarta; Referees: Tahara (JPN), Han (KOR)
21 August; 15:50	Chan, Ng, Lau K. 1	Goals	Xiong 4	Gelora Bung Karno Aquatic Stadium, Jakarta; Referees: Tahara (JPN), Han (KOR)

21 August; 17:10	Kazakhstan	12–11	Japan	Gelora Bung Karno Aquatic Stadium, Jakarta; Referees: Stavridis (GRE), Štampalija (CRO)
21 August; 17:10	Score by quarters: 1–0, 3–3, 4–5, 4–3			Gelora Bung Karno Aquatic Stadium, Jakarta; Referees: Stavridis (GRE), Štampalija (CRO)
21 August; 17:10	Myrzabekova 6	Goals	Magariyama, Hashida 3	Gelora Bung Karno Aquatic Stadium, Jakarta; Referees: Stavridis (GRE), Štampalija (CRO)

== Final standing ==
Rank	Team	Pld	W	D	L
1st place, gold medalist(s)	China	5	5	0	0
2nd place, silver medalist(s)	Kazakhstan	5	4	0	1
3rd place, bronze medalist(s)	Japan	5	3	0	2
4	Thailand	5	2	0	3
5	Indonesia	5	1	0	4
6	Hong Kong	5	0	0	5
