= Yuki Moriya =

Japanese water polo player

Personal information
- Nationality: Japanese
- Born: 12 April 2005 (age 21) Kanagawa Prefecture, Japan
- Education: Nippon Sport Science University

Sport
- Sport: Water polo
- Position: Field player
Medal record
Men's water polo
Representing Japan
Asian Games
Gold medal – first place	2026 Aichi-Nagoya	Team

Yuki Moriya (Japanese: 森谷雄輝; born 12 April 2005) is a Japanese water polo player who plays as a field player. He represents Japan internationally and won a gold medal as a member of the Japanese team at the 2026 Asian Games.

== Career ==
Moriya was born in Kanagawa Prefecture and attended Kanagawa Technical High School before entering Nippon Sport Science University. He developed as a water polo player and represented Japan in junior and senior international competitions. He plays as a field player and has represented Nippon Sport Science University.

In 2023, Moriya was selected for Japan's men's team at the 2023 Men's U20 Water Polo World Championship. He was listed as a field player for Kanagawa Technical High School and was one of the younger members of the Japanese squad.

Moriya continued his development at Nippon Sport Science University and was selected for Japan's senior national team. In 2025, he represented Japan at the 2025 Asian Water Polo Championship in Ahmedabad, India. He was listed as a field player for Nippon Sport Science University.

Later in 2025, Moriya competed at the 2025 World Aquatics Championships in Singapore as part of Japan's men's water polo team. He was listed as a field player and wore number 15.

In 2026, Moriya was selected for Japan's squad at the 2026 Men's Water Polo World Cup Division 2. He remained a field player for Nippon Sport Science University and continued to be selected for the senior national team.

Later in 2026, Moriya represented Japan at the 2026 Asian Games in Aichi-Nagoya. He was selected as a field player wearing number 6 and was listed as a third-year student at Nippon Sport Science University.

Japan won the men's water polo tournament, defeating Kazakhstan 24–7 in the final on 3 October 2026. The victory gave Japan its second consecutive and fifth overall Asian Games men's water polo title, with Moriya part of the gold-medal-winning squad.
