= Momo Inoue =

Japanese water polo player

Personal information
- Nationality: Japanese
- Born: 2 February 2003 (age 23) Yamagata Prefecture, Japan
- Height: 167 cm (66 in)

Sport
- Sport: Water polo
- Position: Field player
Medal record
Women's water polo
Representing Japan
Asian Games
Silver medal – second place	2022 Hangzhou	Team
Silver medal – second place	2026 Aichi–Nagoya	Team
Asian Championships
Silver medal – second place	2025 Zhaoqing	Team

Momo Inoue (井上 萌々, Inoue Momo; born 2 February 2003) is a Japanese water polo player. She plays as a field player and has represented the Japan women's national water polo team in international competition.

== Career ==
Inoue represented Japan in the women's water polo tournament at the 2022 Asian Games in Hangzhou, China. Japan reached the final against China on 1 October 2023 and won the silver medal. Inoue scored during the tournament, including in Japan's group-stage victory over Thailand and its win over Uzbekistan.

In February 2025, Inoue was part of Japan's women's squad at the Asian Water Polo Championships in Zhaoqing, China. Japan finished second behind China, earning the silver medal.

In 2026, Inoue competed for Japan at the 2026 Asian Games in Aichi and Nagoya. Japan won the silver medal after losing to China in the final in a penalty shootout. During the tournament, Inoue scored in Japan's matches against Uzbekistan and Singapore. A report by the Japanese Olympic Committee also highlighted her scoring in Japan's 27–10 victory over Uzbekistan.
