= Nina Lowrey =

Japanese water polo player

Personal information
- Nationality: Japanese
- Born: Nina Lowrey; May 23, 2009 (age 17) Japan
- Height: 167 cm (66 in)
- Weight: 56 kg (123 lb)

Sport
- Sport: Water polo
- Position: Field player
Medal record
Women's water polo
Representing Japan
Asian Games
Silver medal – second place	2026 Aichi–Nagoya	Team
Asian Aquatics Championships
Silver medal – second place	2025 Ahmedabad	Team

Nina Lowrey (Japanese: ローリー 仁愛; born 23 May 2009) is a Japanese water polo player who competes as a field player. She represents the Japan women's national water polo team and is affiliated with Violet Stars and Haruno High School in Kochi Prefecture.

== Career ==
Lowrey made her international debut at the 2026 Women's Water Polo World Cup Division I tournament. She scored three goals in Japan's match against Spain, although Japan lost 26–10. She also scored for Japan in its match against Greece during the tournament's placement round.

In July 2026, Lowrey represented Japan at the Asian Age Group Championships in Bangkok, Thailand, competing in the under-19 women's tournament. She scored three goals in Japan's 19–8 win over Kazakhstan and six goals in a match against China.

In September 2026, Lowrey competed at the 2026 Asian Games in Aichi and Nagoya, Japan. She was the youngest member of Japan's women's water polo squad at the Games, representing the national team in its campaign for the medal. Japan defeated Thailand 27–7 in its opening match, with every Japanese player scoring at least once. Lowrey scored in Japan's subsequent victories over Singapore and Hong Kong. Japan finished the tournament with the silver medal after losing to China in a penalty shootout in the final. Lowrey was part of the silver-medal-winning Japanese team, earning her first Asian Games medal.
