= Ai Sunabe =

Japanese water polo player (born 2002)

Personal information
- Nationality: Japanese
- Born: 14 September 2002 (age 24) Okinawa, Japan
- Height: 161 cm (63 in)

Sport
- Sport: Water polo
- Position: Field player
Medal record
Women's water polo
Representing Japan
Asian Games
Silver medal – second place	2022 Hangzhou	Team
Silver medal – second place	2026 Aichi–Nagoya	Team
Asian Championships
Silver medal – second place	2025 Zhaoqing	Team

Ai Sunabe (Japanese: 砂邊亜衣; born 14 September 2002) is a Japanese water polo player who plays as a field player. She has represented Japan in international competitions, including the Asian Games and the Asian Aquatics Championships. She won silver medals in the women's water polo tournament at the 2022 and 2026 Asian Games and the 2025 Asian Water Polo Championships.

== Career ==
Sunabe studied at Shumei University and competed for its water polo club. She developed as a field player and became a member of Japan's women's national team. Her club and employment affiliations have included Shumei University Water Polo Club and Inaho Sports.

=== International career ===
Sunabe represented Japan at the 2022 Asian Games in Hangzhou, China. Japan won the silver medal in the women's water polo tournament, finishing behind China. Sunabe was included in Japan's squad for the competition.

In February and March 2025, Sunabe competed at the Asian Water Polo Championships in Zhaoqing, China, as part of Japan's women's national team. Japan finished second after a closely contested match against China that was decided by a penalty shootout, losing 17–18. Sunabe scored twice in the match and helped Japan secure qualification for the 2025 World Aquatics Championships in Singapore.

Sunabe was also selected for Japan's women's team at the 2025 World Aquatics Championships in Singapore. She was listed among the Japanese players in the official national-team roster for the tournament.

Sunabe represented Japan at the 2026 Asian Games in Aichi and Nagoya. Japan advanced to the women's water polo final and won the silver medal after finishing second in the tournament. The result gave Sunabe her second Asian Games silver medal, following Japan's runner-up finish in Hangzhou in 2022.
