= Fuka Nishiyama =

Japanese water polo player

Personal information
- Nationality: Japanese
- Born: 19 April 2000 (age 26) Japan
- Height: 155 cm (61 in)

Sport
- Sport: Water polo
- Position: Field player
Medal record
Women's water polo
Representing Japan
Asian Games
Silver medal – second place	2022 Hangzhou	Team
Silver medal – second place	2026 Aichi–Nagoya	Team
Asian Championships
Silver medal – second place	2025 Zhaoqing	Team

Fuka Nishiyama (西山 風花, Nishiyama Fuka; born 19 April 2000) is a Japanese water polo player. She plays as a field player and represents the Japan women's national water polo team.

Nishiyama represented Japan at the 2022 Asian Games in Hangzhou, China, where the Japanese women's team won the silver medal. She was also selected for Japan's squad at the 2025 Asian Water Polo Championship in Zhaoqing, China.

In 2026, Nishiyama represented Japan at the 2026 Asian Games in Aichi–Nagoya, where the women's team won the silver medal.
