= Enishi Ura =

Japanese water polo player (born 2005)

Personal information
- Nationality: Japanese
- Born: 20 January 2005 (age 21) Ishikawa Prefecture, Japan
- Education: Nippon Sport Science University

Sport
- Sport: Water polo
- Position: Driver
Medal record
Men's water polo
Representing Japan
Asian Games
Gold medal – first place	2026 Aichi-Nagoya	Team

Enishi Ura (Japanese: 浦縁至; born 20 January 2005) is a Japanese water polo player who plays as a driver. He is a member of the Japanese national team and won a gold medal at the 2026 Asian Games.

== Career ==
Ura was born in Ishikawa Prefecture and attended Kanazawa Municipal Technical High School before entering Nippon Sport Science University. In 2023, Ura was selected for Japan's men's team at the 2023 Men's U20 Water Polo World Championship. At the time, he was a first-year student at Nippon Sport Science University and was listed as a field player in the Japanese squad. During the 2025 Japan Intercollegiate Swimming Championships, he was included in the university's squad that reached the men's semi-finals.

In 2025, he was selected for Japan's squad at the 2025 Asian Aquatics Championships in Ahmedabad, India, where he was listed as team captain. In July 2025, Ura was added to Japan's men's squad for the 2025 World Aquatics Championships in Singapore as a replacement player. He subsequently competed in the tournament as a field player. At the World Championships, Ura scored three goals in Japan's 22–11 victory over Brazil in the classification round for ninth to twelfth place. He scored twice in the match, including a goal on a counterattack in the first period and another late in the fourth period.

In 2026, Ura was selected for Japan's squad at the 2026 Men's Water Polo World Cup Division 2. He remained a field player for Nippon Sport Science University and wore number 5 for Japan. Later in 2026, Ura was selected for Japan's men's water polo team at the 2026 Asian Games in Aichi-Nagoya. Before the tournament, Ura said that he wanted to contribute to Japan's pursuit of the Asian title and inspire young athletes through his performances.

Japan won all six of its matches in the men's water polo tournament. In the final on 3 October, Japan defeated Kazakhstan 24–7 to win the gold medal and retain the Asian Games title. Ura was part of the Japanese squad that won the gold medal.
