= Hikaru Shitara =

Japanese water polo player (born 1999)

Personal information
- Nationality: Japanese
- Born: 23 June 1999 (age 27)
- Height: 162 cm (64 in)

Sport
- Sport: Water polo
- Position: Field player
Medal record
Women's water polo
Representing Japan
Asian Games
Silver medal – second place	2022 Hangzhou	Team
Silver medal – second place	2026 Aichi–Nagoya	Team
Asian Championships
Silver medal – second place	2025 Zhaoqing	Team

Hikaru Shitara (Japanese: 設樂ひかる; born 23 June 1999) is a Japanese water polo player who plays as a field player. She represents NSSU Water Polo Club and is affiliated with IKAI. She has won three silver medals with Japan's women's national team at the 2022 and 2026 Asian Games and the 2025 Asian Water Polo Championships.

== Career ==
Shitara attended Yamagata Prefectural Yamagata Technical High School before enrolling at Nippon Sport Science University. She competed for the university's water polo programme and subsequently represented NSSU Water Polo Club. She plays as a field player and has represented Japan at major international competitions.

=== International career ===
Shitara was a member of Japan's women's water polo team at the 2022 Asian Games in Hangzhou, China. Japan won the silver medal in the women's tournament, finishing behind China. Shitara was listed among the Japanese players in the official team roster.

In 2025, Shitara represented Japan at the Asian Water Polo Championships in Zhaoqing, China. Japan reached the women's final against China and finished second after the match was decided by a penalty shootout. The result earned Japan the silver medal.

Later that year, Shitara competed for Japan at the 2025 World Aquatics Championships in Singapore. Japan finished eighth in the women's water polo tournament. Shitara scored during Japan's match against Italy in the placement round.

Shitara was also named to Japan's squad for the 2025 Women's Water Polo World Cup. She competed in the Division 2 and final-stage competitions as part of Japan's national team programme.

Shitara represented Japan at the 2026 Asian Games in Aichi and Nagoya. Japan advanced to the women's final, where it faced China on 24 September. Japan finished second after the match was decided by a penalty shootout, earning the silver medal. The result gave Shitara her second Asian Games silver medal, following Japan's runner-up finish in 2022.
