= Ren Sasano =

Japanese water polo player

Personal information
- Nationality: Japanese
- Born: 13 June 2001 (age 25) Nagasaki Prefecture, Japan
- Education: Nippon Sport Science University
- Height: 185 cm (6 ft 1 in)

Sport
- Sport: Water polo
- Position: Goalkeeper
Medal record
Men's water polo
Representing Japan
Asian Games
Gold medal – first place	2026 Aichi–Nagoya	Team

Ren Sasano (Japanese: 佐々野 廉; born 13 June 2001) is a Japanese water polo player who plays as a goalkeeper. He represents Japan internationally and has competed at the World Aquatics Championships and Asian Games.

== Career ==
Sasano attended Nagasaki Technical High School before studying at Nippon Sport Science University. He competed for Nippon Sport Science University in Japanese domestic competitions, iincluding the All Japan Swimming Championships water polo tournament.

In 2023, Sasano was selected for the Japan men's team at the 2023 World Aquatics Championships in Fukuoka. He was subsequently selected for Japan's teams at the 2024 World Aquatics Championships in Doha and the 2025 World Aquatics Championships in Singapore.

Sasano was also selected for Japan at the 2025 World Aquatics Water Polo World Cup and continued to compete internationally as a goalkeeper.

At the 2026 Asian Games in Aichi-Nagoya, Sasano was selected as one of Japan's two goalkeepers. Japan defeated Kazakhstan in the final to win the men's tournament, giving Sasano his first Asian Games gold medal.
