= Haruka Inaba =

Japanese water polo player (born 2002)

Shoka Fukuda
Personal information
- Nationality: Japanese
- Born: 2 February 2006 (age 20) Yamaguchi Prefecture, Japan
- Height: 160 cm (5 ft 3 in)

Sport
- Sport: Water polo
- Position: Field player
Medal record
Women's water polo
Representing Japan
Asian Games
Silver medal – second place	2026 Aichi–Nagoya	Team
Asian Championships
Silver medal – second place	2025 Zhaoqing	Team

Haruka Inaba (Japanese: 稲場晴香; born 2 February 2002) is a Japanese water polo player who plays as a goalkeeper. She represents Shumei University Water Polo Club and is affiliated with Shiotani Construction. Inaba has won silver medals with Japan's women's national team at the 2025 Asian Championships and the 2026 Asian Games.

== Career ==
Inaba attended Toyama Hokubu High School before enrolling at Shumei University, where she competed for the university's water polo club. She represented the university in student competitions and was selected for Japan's national team. She plays as a goalkeeper.

=== International career ===
Inaba represented Japan at the 2025 Asian Championships in Zhaoqing, China. Japan reached the women's water polo final against China. The match ended in a tie in regulation time and was decided by a penalty shootout, which China won 18–17. Inaba contributed to Japan's defensive performance as the team finished second and earned the silver medal.

In 2025, she was also part of Japan's women's team at the 2025 World Aquatics Championships in Singapore. Japan finished eighth in the tournament. During the same year, Inaba competed in the Women's Water Polo World Cup, helping Japan win the Division 2 competition before finishing seventh in the final tournament.

Inaba was selected for Japan's women's water polo team at the 2026 Asian Games in Aichi and Nagoya. Japan advanced through the preliminary rounds and reached the final against China on 24 September 2026. Inaba played as the team's goalkeeper during the competition. The final against China was decided by a penalty shootout after the teams finished level in regulation time. Japan lost 17–18 and received the silver medal, its second consecutive runner-up finish at the Asian Water Polo Championships and Asian Games level.
