= Taiyo Watanabe =

Japanese water polo player

Personal information
- Nationality: Japanese
- Born: 4 October 2001 (age 25) Kyoto Prefecture, Japan
- Education: Nippon Sport Science University

Sport
- Sport: Water polo
- Position: Driver
Medal record
Men's water polo
Representing Japan
Asian Games
| Gold medal – first place | 2022 Hangzhou | Team |
| Gold medal – first place | 2026 Aichi-Nagoya | Team |

Taiyo Watanabe (Japanese: 渡邉太陽; born 4 October 2001) is a Japanese water polo player who plays as a driver. He represents Japan internationally and competed at the 2024 Summer Olympics. He won gold medals with Japan at the 2022 Asian Games and the 2026 Asian Games.

== Career ==
Watanabe was born in Kyoto Prefecture and attended Nippon Sport Science University. He developed as a water polo player and became a member of the Japanese senior national team. He has represented IKAI・Kingfisher74 in domestic and international competition.

Watanabe represented Japan at the 2022 Asian Games, which were held in Hangzhou in 2023 after being postponed. Japan won the men's water polo tournament, earning the gold medal.

In 2023, Watanabe also represented Japan at the 2023 World Aquatics Championships in Fukuoka. He was listed as a field player for the Japanese team.

In 2024, Watanabe was selected for Japan's men's water polo team at the 2024 Summer Olympics in Paris. Japan finished 11th in the men's tournament.

In 2025, Watanabe represented Japan at the 2025 World Aquatics Championships in Singapore. He scored in several matches during the tournament, including four goals in Japan's 22–11 victory over Brazil in the classification round. He was named player of the match in Japan's 20–19 victory over Romania in the ninth-place match.

Watanabe was selected for Japan's men's team at the 2026 Asian Games in Aichi-Nagoya. He was listed as a field player and represented CNC Group Cosmonet and IKAI・Kingfisher74. Watanabe was part of the Japanese team that won the men's water polo tournament. Japan defeated Kazakhstan 24–7 in the final on 3 October 2026 to retain the Asian Games title. Watanabe therefore won his second Asian Games gold medal.
