= Jun Lowrey =

Japanese water polo player

Personal information
- Nationality: Japanese
- Born: 5 June 2005 (age 21) Kōchi Prefecture, Japan
- Education: Nippon Sport Science University
- Height: 182 cm (6 ft 0 in)

Sport
- Sport: Water polo
- Position: Driver
Medal record
Men's water polo
Representing Japan
Asian Games
Gold medal – first place	2026 Aichi–Nagoya	Team

Jun Lowrey (Japanese: ローリー 隼; born 5 June 2005) is a Japanese water polo player who plays as a driver. He represents Japan internationally and competes for Nippon Sport Science University.

== Career ==
Lowrey was born in Kōchi Prefecture and attended Kōchi Higashi High School. He played for the school's water polo team and served as its captain. In 2022, Kōchi Higashi High School reached the third-place match at the Inter High School Championships, with Lowrey among the team's leading players.

In 2023, Lowrey was featured as the captain of Kōchi Higashi High School's water polo team in an NHK documentary following the team during its campaign to compete at the national level. The programme focused on the team's preparations and Lowrey's role in leading the side.

Lowrey subsequently entered Nippon Sport Science University. He was selected for Japan's men's national team and competed at the 2025 World Aquatics Championships in Singapore. In the tournament, Japan finished ninth after defeating Romania in a penalty shootout in the ninth-place match; Lowrey was included in Japan's squad as a driver.

At the 2025 Asian Aquatics Championships in Ahmedabad, Lowrey scored six goals in Japan's 35–11 victory over India in the men's preliminary round. Japan eventually finished fourth after losing the bronze-medal match to Kazakhstan, with Lowrey scoring three goals in the match.

At the 2026 Asian Games in Aichi-Nagoya, Lowrey made his Asian Games debut as part of the Japanese men's team. Japan advanced through the group stage undefeated and defeated Singapore 32–8 in the quarter-final and Iran 26–12 in the semi-final. Lowrey scored two goals against Thailand, three against Hong Kong, three against Singapore and two against Kazakhstan in the final.

In the gold-medal match on 3 October 2026, Japan defeated Kazakhstan 24–7 to win the men's water polo tournament. Lowrey scored two goals in the final, as Japan successfully defended its Asian Games title.
