= Saya Sekine =

Japanese water polo player (born 2003)

Personal information
- Nationality: Japanese
- Born: 23 March 2003 (age 23)
- Height: 162 cm (64 in)

Sport
- Sport: Water polo
- Position: Field player
Medal record
Women's water polo
Representing Japan
Asian Games
Silver medal – second place	2026 Aichi–Nagoya	Team
Asian Championships
Silver medal – second place	2025 Zhaoqing	Team

Saya Sekine (Japanese: 関根桜彩; born 23 March 2003) is a Japanese water polo player who plays as a field player. She represents Shumei University Water Polo Club and is affiliated with Koshin Dairy. Sekine has won silver medals with Japan's women's national team at the 2025 Asian Water Polo Championships and the 2026 Asian Games, and was part of the team that won the Division 2 title at the 2025 Women's Water Polo World Cup.

== Career ==
Sekine competed for Shumei University and its water polo club. She plays as a field player and has represented Japan in international women's water polo competitions. She was selected for the Japanese national team for the 2025 Asian Water Polo Championships and the 2025 World Aquatics Championships.

Sekine represented Japan at the 2025 Asian Water Polo Championships in Zhaoqing, China. Japan advanced to the women's final against China on 2 March. The match was decided by a penalty shootout after the teams were level at the end of regulation time. Japan lost 17–18 and finished second, earning the silver medal. Sekine scored during the tournament, including in Japan's preliminary-round victories over Singapore and Kazakhstan.

Sekine was part of Japan's women's national team at the Division 2 tournament of the 2025 Women's Water Polo World Cup in Istanbul, Turkey. Japan defeated China in the final to win the Division 2 title. The result also secured promotion for Japan and China to Division 1 for the following season.

Sekine was selected for Japan's women's water polo team at the 2026 Asian Games in Aichi and Nagoya. Japan won its preliminary-round matches against Thailand, Kazakhstan, Uzbekistan and Singapore before facing China in the final. Sekine scored in several of Japan's preliminary matches. The final against China was played on 24 September 2026. Japan and China were tied 14–14 at the end of regulation time, before China won the penalty shootout 5–4. Japan finished second and received the silver medal, giving Sekine another major international team medal.
