= Japan women's national water polo team =

Japan
- FINA code: JPN
- Association: Japan Swimming Federation
- Confederation: AASF (Asia)
- Head coach: Shota Hazui
- Asst coach: Makiko Izuo; Tsubasa Mori
- Captain: Akari Inaba

FINA ranking (since 2008)
- Current: 8 (as of 9 August 2021)
- Highest: 8 (2021)

Olympic Games
- Appearances: 1 (first in 2020)
- Best result: 9th place (2020)

World Championship
- Appearances: 7 (first in 2001)
- Best result: 8th place (2025)

World Cup
- Appearances: 3 (first in 1991)
- Best result: 6th place (1991)

Media
- Website: swim.or.jp

The Japan women's national water polo team is the representative for Japan in international women's water polo.

== Results ==
=== Olympic Games ===
- 2020 – 9th place

=== World Championship ===
- 2001 – 11th place
- 2003 – 11th place
- 2015 – 15th place
- 2017 – 13th place
- 2019 – 13th place
- 2022 – Withdrawn
- 2023 – 14th place
- 2024 – Withdrew
- 2025 – 8th place

=== World Cup ===
- 1991 – 6th place
- 1993 – 7th place
- 2025 – 7th place

== Current squad ==
Roster for the 2025 World Championships.

Head coach: Shota Hazui

- 1 Haruka Inaba GK
- 2 Yumi Arima FP
- 3 Akari Inaba FP
- 4 Eruna Ura FP
- 5 Kako Kawaguchi FP
- 6 Hikaru Shitara FP
- 7 Ai Sunabe FP
- 8 Saya Sekine FP
- 9 Riko Otsubo FP
- 10 Fuka Nishiyama FP
- 11 Momo Inoue FP
- 12 Maho Kobayashi FP
- 13 Manami Noda GK
- 14 Shoka Fukuda FP
- 15 Momone Ninagawa FP
