= Riko Otsubo =

Japanese water polo player

Personal information
- Nationality: Japanese
- Born: 17 November 2004 (age 22) Chiba Prefecture, Japan
- Height: 167 cm (5 ft 6 in)

Sport
- Sport: Water polo
- Position: Field player
Medal record
Women's water polo
Representing Japan
Asian Games
Silver medal – second place	2026 Aichi–Nagoya	Team
Asian Championships
Silver medal – second place	2025 Zhaoqing	Team

Riko Otsubo (Japanese: 大坪莉子; born 17 November 2004) is a Japanese water polo player who plays as a field player. She represents Shumei University and Shumei Yachiyo Water Polo Club. She is a member of Japan's women's national team and won silver medals at the 2025 Asian Aquatics Championships and the 2026 Asian Games.

== Career ==
Otsubo attended Makuhari Sogo High School before continuing her education at Shumei University in Chiba Prefecture. She competed for Shumei University Water Polo Club and developed as a field player. Her performances at university level led to selection for Japan's women's national team.

=== International career ===
Otsubo represented Japan at the 2025 Asian Aquatics Championships in Zhaoqing, China. She competed in the women's water polo tournament, scoring two goals in Japan's opening match against Uzbekistan and one goal against Hong Kong. Japan advanced to the final against China on 2 March 2025 and finished second after losing 17–18 in a penalty shootout, earning the silver medal.

Otsubo was also selected for Japan's women's team at the 2025 World Aquatics Championships in Singapore. The selection formed part of her continued participation in senior international competition.

In 2025, Otsubo was recognised by Shumei University for her achievements in international water polo. The university named her among its athletes honoured at the Chiba Prefecture sports awards ceremony, recognising her participation in international competitions including the World Aquatics Championships and the Women's Water Polo World Cup.

Otsubo was selected for Japan's women's water polo team at the 2026 Asian Games in Aichi and Nagoya. She competed as a field player as Japan progressed through the tournament to the final against China. Japan finished second in the women's tournament, earning the silver medal. This result gave Otsubo her second major international team silver medal, following Japan's runner-up finish at the 2025 Asian Aquatics Championships.
