= Ikkei Nitta =

Japanese water polo player

Personal information
- Nationality: Japanese
- Born: 23 April 1998 (age 28) Ishikawa Prefecture, Japan
- Education: Niigata Sangyo University

Sport
- Sport: Water polo
- Position: Centre back
Medal record
Men's water polo
Representing Japan
Asian Games
Gold medal – first place	2022 Hangzhou	Team
Gold medal – first place	2026 Aichi-Nagoya	Team

Ikkei Nitta (Japanese: 新田一景; born 23 April 1998) is a Japanese water polo player who plays as a centre back. He represents Japan internationally and competed at the 2024 Summer Olympics. He won gold medals with Japan at the 2022 Asian Games and 2026 Asian Games.

== Career ==
Nitta was born in Ishikawa Prefecture and attended Kanazawa Municipal Technical High School, where he served as captain of the men's water polo team. He led the school to victory at the national high school championships and subsequently attended Niigata Sangyo University.

After graduating from university, Nitta joined Bourbon Water Polo Club Kashiwazaki and became a member of the Japanese national team. He developed into a regular centre-back for Japan and competed in major international tournaments.

Nitta represented Japan at the 2022 Asian Games, which were held in Hangzhou in 2023 after being postponed. Japan won the men's water polo tournament, defeating China in the final to claim the gold medal. Nitta was part of the Japanese squad that won the country's first Asian Games men's water polo title in 53 years.

In 2024, Nitta was selected for Japan's men's water polo team at the 2024 Summer Olympics in Paris. Japan finished 11th in the men's tournament after being eliminated in the preliminary round.

In January 2025, Nitta represented Japan at the World Aquatics Men's Water Polo World Cup Division 1 in Romania. Japan finished sixth in the tournament and qualified for the World Cup final tournament. Nitta competed as a member of Bourbon Water Polo Club Kashiwazaki.

Later in 2025, Nitta was selected for Japan's squad at the 2025 World Aquatics Championships in Singapore. He was listed as a field player and represented Bourbon Water Polo Club Kashiwazaki.

In 2026, Nitta was selected for Japan's men's water polo team at the 2026 Asian Games in Aichi-Nagoya. He was listed as a centre-back and represented Bourbon Water Polo Club Kashiwazaki.

Nitta scored twice in Japan's opening match of the Asian Games, a 19–11 victory over Kazakhstan on 26 September. He also scored in Japan's 30–6 win over Hong Kong in the group stage and contributed to the team's progression to the knockout rounds.

Japan defeated Singapore 32–8 in the quarter-final and Iran 26–12 in the semi-final before facing Kazakhstan in the final. On 3 October 2026, Japan defeated Kazakhstan 24–7 to win the gold medal and successfully defend its Asian Games title. Nitta scored twice in the final and finished the tournament as one of Japan's contributors in attack. The victory gave Nitta his second Asian Games gold medal and helped Japan win its fifth men's water polo title at the Asian Games.
