= Shen Yineng =

Chinese water polo player (born 1995)

Personal information
- Nationality: China
- Born: 18 January 1995 (age 31)
- Height: 1.88 m (6 ft 2 in)

Sport
- Sport: Water polo
Medal record
Representing China
Asian Games
Gold medal – first place	2018 Jakarta	Team
Gold medal – first place	2026 Aichi–Nagoya	Team

Shen Yineng traditional Chinese 沉以能 Simplified Chinese 沉以能(born 18 January 1995) is a Chinese water polo player. She competed in the 2020 Summer Olympics.
