= Eruna Ura =

Japanese water polo player

Personal information
- Nationality: Japanese
- Born: 14 October 2002 (age 24) Hakusan, Ishikawa, Japan
- Height: 169 cm (67 in)
- Weight: 61 kg (134 lb)

Sport
- Sport: Water polo
Medal record
Representing Japan
Asian Games
Silver medal – second place	2022 Hangzhou	Team
Silver medal – second place	2026 Aichi–Nagoya	Team

Eruna Ura (浦 映月; born 14 October 2002) is a Japanese water polo player. She was selected to the Japan women's national water polo team, for the 2020 Summer Olympics.

She participated in the 2019 FINA Women's Junior Water Polo World League, and 2021 FINA Women's Water Polo World League.
