= Manami Noda =

Japanese water polo player

Personal information
- Nationality: Japanese
- Born: 2 February 2000 (age 26) Miyazaki Prefecture, Japan
- Height: 166 cm (65 in)

Sport
- Sport: Water polo
- Position: Goalkeeper
Medal record
Women's water polo
Representing Japan
Asian Games
Silver medal – second place	2026 Aichi–Nagoya	Team

Manami Noda (Japanese: 野田 茉波; born 2 February 2000) is a Japanese water polo player who plays as a goalkeeper. She represents the Japan women's national water polo team and is affiliated with Violet Stars and the Miyazaki Prefectural Sports Association.

== Career ==
Noda represented Japan at the 2025 World Aquatics Championships in Singapore as a member of the women's water polo squad.

In September 2026, Noda competed for Japan at the 2026 Asian Games in Aichi and Nagoya. Japan won the silver medal in the women's water polo tournament after reaching the final against China. During Japan's 27–10 victory over Uzbekistan in the group stage, Noda came on as a substitute goalkeeper and made several saves as Japan maintained its lead.
