= Shoka Fukuda =

Japanese water polo player (born 2006)

Personal information
- Nationality: Japanese
- Born: 2 February 2006 (age 20) Yamaguchi Prefecture, Japan
- Height: 160 cm (63 in)

Sport
- Sport: Water polo
- Position: Field player
Medal record
Women's water polo
Representing Japan
Asian Games
| Silver medal – second place | 2026 Aichi-Nagoya | Team |
Asian Aquatics Championships
| Silver medal – second place | 2025 Ahmedabad | Team |

Shoka Fukuda (Japanese: 福田星香; born 2 February 2006) is a Japanese water polo player who plays as a field player. She represents Nippon Sport Science University and NSSU Water Polo Club. She has won silver medals with Japan's women's national team at the 2025 Asian Aquatics Championships and the 2026 Asian Games.

== Career ==
Fukuda was born on 2 February 2006 and attended school in Yamaguchi Prefecture before pursuing university studies at Nippon Sport Science University in Tokyo. She competes for the university's water polo programme and NSSU Water Polo Club. She plays as a field player for Japan's women's national team.

Fukuda represented Japan at the 2025 Asian Aquatics Championships in Ahmedabad, India. Japan advanced to the women's final against China on 11 October. Fukuda scored four goals in the match, which ended in a 17–18 defeat for Japan following a penalty shootout. Japan finished second and won the silver medal.

Japan's second-place finish also secured qualification for the women's water polo tournament at the 2025 World Aquatics Championships in Singapore.

Fukuda was selected for Japan's women's water polo team at the 2026 Asian Games in Aichi and Nagoya. During the preliminary stage, she scored four goals in Japan's 25–7 victory over Singapore. Japan advanced to the medal rounds after a series of wins. Japan faced China in the final on 24 September 2026. The match was decided by a penalty shootout, with Japan losing 17–18 and earning the silver medal. Fukuda was part of the Japanese squad that finished runner-up at the Games.
