= Maho Kobayashi =

Japanese water polo player

Personal information
- Nationality: Japanese
- Born: 18 November 2005 (age 20)
- Height: 162 cm (64 in)

Sport
- Sport: Water polo
- Position: Field player
Medal record
Women's water polo
Representing Japan
Asian Games
Silver medal – second place	2026 Aichi–Nagoya	Team
Asian Aquatics Championships
Silver medal – second place	2025 Ahmedabad	Team

Maho Kobayashi (Japanese: 小林 真穂; born 18 November 2005) is a Japanese water polo player. She plays as a field player and represents the Japan women's national water polo team. She is affiliated with Shumei University and its water polo club.

== Career ==
Kobayashi represented Japan at the 2025 World Aquatics Championships in Singapore and competed for the national team at the 2025 Asian Aquatics Championships in Ahmedabad, India. In the women's final of the Asian Aquatics Championships, Japan lost 22–17 to China and finished with the silver medal. Kobayashi scored six goals in the final, making her Japan's leading scorer in the match.

In September 2026, Kobayashi represented Japan in the women's water polo tournament at the 2026 Asian Games in Aichi and Nagoya, Japan. Japan reached the final against China and won the silver medal after the match was decided by a penalty shootout.
