= Water polo at the 2022 Asian Games – Women's tournament =

Women at the 2022 Asian Games
- Venue: Huanglong Swimming Center
- Date: 25 September – 1 October 2023
- Competitors: 89 from 7 nations

Medalists
gold medal	China
silver medal	Japan
bronze medal	Kazakhstan

The women's tournament of Water polo at the 2022 Asian Games at Hangzhou, China was held from 25 September to 1 October 2023 at the Huanglong Swimming Center.
The Asian Games acted as the Asian qualifying tournament for the 2024 Summer Olympics in Paris.

== Squads ==
China	Japan	Kazakhstan	Singapore
Zhang Jiaqi; Yan Siya; Yan Jing; Xiong Dunhan; Zhai Ying; Wang Shiyun; Lu Yiwen; Wang Huan; Deng Zewen; Nong Sanfeng; Chen Xiao; Zhang Jing; Dong Wenxin	Minami Shioya; Yumi Arima; Akari Inaba; Eruna Ura; Kako Kawaguchi; Hikaru Shitara; Ai Sunabe; Eri Kitamura; Kiyoka Goto; Fuka Nishiyama; Momo Inoue	Alexandra Zharkimbayeva; Darya Pochinok; Anastassiya Glukhova; Viktoriya Kaplun; Valeriya Anossova; Madina Rakhmanova; Anna Novikova; Yelizaveta Rudneva; Milena Nabiyeva; Viktoriya Khritankova; Anastassiya Mirshina; Anastassiya Tsoy; Mariya Martynenko	Rochelle Ong; Gina Koh; Michelle Tan; Ranice Yap; Koh Ting Ting; Nicole Lim; Abielle Yeo; Melissa Chan; Heather Lee; Ong Cheng Jing; Celeste Wan; Chow Yan Teng; Mounisha Devi Manivannan
South Korea	Thailand	Uzbekistan	
Oh Hee-ji; Hong Seo-yeon; Han Ye-vin; Choi Ju-hee; Claudia Lee; Kang Jominji; Bae A-rin; Kim Seo-won; Seol Ji-seon; Kim Ye-jin; Park Ye-eun; Moon Da-yoon; Jang Hwan-hee	Satakamol Wongpairoj; Thanidakarn Kwantongtanaree; Pranisa Nilklad; Wataniya Nilklad; Panita Pukkaman; Kornkarn Puengpongsakul; Thanita Kongchouy; Benyakorn Khunprathum; Raksina Rueangsappaisan; Kanruetai Riangsuntea; Yanisa Turon; Panchita Rodwattanadisakul; Phanthila Arsayuth	Madinabonu Khafizova; Elena Gavashelashvili; Khilola Yusupova; Sofiya Andryakhina; Aziza Salamatova; Aleksa Verklova; Makhpal Asilbekova; Valeriya Muratova; Amilya Gabzalilova; Komila Murtazaeva; Nikhola Akhmadkhanova; Kristina Logutova; Aziza Azizova	

== Results ==
All times are China Standard Time (UTC+08:00)

Pos	Team	Pld	W	PW	PL	L	GF	GA	GD	Pts
1	China	6	6	0	0	0	155	38	+117	18
2	Japan	6	5	0	0	1	170	63	+107	15
3	Kazakhstan	6	4	0	0	2	87	66	+21	12
4	Singapore	6	3	0	0	3	59	90	−31	9
5	Thailand	6	2	0	0	4	70	96	−26	6
6	Uzbekistan	6	1	0	0	5	60	125	−65	3
7	South Korea	6	0	0	0	6	25	148	−123	0

Source: OCA

25 September; 15:00	Kazakhstan	12–6	Singapore	Huanglong Swimming Center, Hangzhou; Referees: Moller (ARG), Chen (CHN)
25 September; 15:00	Score by quarters: 3–1, 2–3, 3–2, 4–0			Huanglong Swimming Center, Hangzhou; Referees: Moller (ARG), Chen (CHN)
25 September; 15:00	Mirshina 4	Goals	Yap, Wan 3	Huanglong Swimming Center, Hangzhou; Referees: Moller (ARG), Chen (CHN)

25 September; 16:30	Japan	33–2	South Korea	Huanglong Swimming Center, Hangzhou; Referees: Tan (SGP), Markova (UZB)
25 September; 16:30	Score by quarters: 14–0, 6–1, 5–1, 8–0			Huanglong Swimming Center, Hangzhou; Referees: Tan (SGP), Markova (UZB)
25 September; 16:30	Shitara 6	Goals	Lee, Moon 1	Huanglong Swimming Center, Hangzhou; Referees: Tan (SGP), Markova (UZB)

25 September; 19:00	China	33–5	Uzbekistan	Huanglong Swimming Center, Hangzhou; Referees: Gómez (ESP), Moribayashi (JPN)
25 September; 19:00	Score by quarters: 8–1, 9–1, 8–1, 8–2			Huanglong Swimming Center, Hangzhou; Referees: Gómez (ESP), Moribayashi (JPN)
25 September; 19:00	Lu, Zhang Jin. 6	Goals	Akhmadkhanova 3	Huanglong Swimming Center, Hangzhou; Referees: Gómez (ESP), Moribayashi (JPN)

26 September; 15:00	Uzbekistan	18–8	South Korea	Huanglong Swimming Center, Hangzhou; Referees: Tan (SGP), Puengpongsakul (THA)
26 September; 15:00	Score by quarters: 4–3, 3–2, 6–2, 5–1			Huanglong Swimming Center, Hangzhou; Referees: Tan (SGP), Puengpongsakul (THA)
26 September; 15:00	Muratova 4	Goals	Lee 5	Huanglong Swimming Center, Hangzhou; Referees: Tan (SGP), Puengpongsakul (THA)

26 September; 16:30	Japan	32–10	Thailand	Huanglong Swimming Center, Hangzhou; Referees: Moller (ARG), Aimbetov (KAZ)
26 September; 16:30	Score by quarters: 6–2, 7–2, 11–3, 8–3			Huanglong Swimming Center, Hangzhou; Referees: Moller (ARG), Aimbetov (KAZ)
26 September; 16:30	Ura 8	Goals	Rueangsappaisan 3	Huanglong Swimming Center, Hangzhou; Referees: Moller (ARG), Aimbetov (KAZ)

26 September; 19:00	China	26–2	Singapore	Huanglong Swimming Center, Hangzhou; Referees: Raković (SRB), An (KOR)
26 September; 19:00	Score by quarters: 6–0, 7–0, 6–1, 7–1			Huanglong Swimming Center, Hangzhou; Referees: Raković (SRB), An (KOR)
26 September; 19:00	Zhang Jin. 6	Goals	G. Koh, Yap 1	Huanglong Swimming Center, Hangzhou; Referees: Raković (SRB), An (KOR)

27 September; 15:00	South Korea	1–24	Singapore	Huanglong Swimming Center, Hangzhou; Referees: Chen (CHN), Puengpongsakul (THA)
27 September; 15:00	Score by quarters: 0–5, 0–6, 0–5, 1–8			Huanglong Swimming Center, Hangzhou; Referees: Chen (CHN), Puengpongsakul (THA)
27 September; 15:00	Han 1	Goals	Yap, Ong C. 4	Huanglong Swimming Center, Hangzhou; Referees: Chen (CHN), Puengpongsakul (THA)

27 September; 16:30	Uzbekistan	11–17	Thailand	Huanglong Swimming Center, Hangzhou; Referees: Aimbetov (KAZ), Moribayashi (JPN)
27 September; 16:30	Score by quarters: 3–2, 4–6, 1–5, 3–4			Huanglong Swimming Center, Hangzhou; Referees: Aimbetov (KAZ), Moribayashi (JPN)
27 September; 16:30	Salamatova 4	Goals	Rueangsappaisan 7	Huanglong Swimming Center, Hangzhou; Referees: Aimbetov (KAZ), Moribayashi (JPN)

27 September; 19:00	China	17–8	Kazakhstan	Huanglong Swimming Center, Hangzhou; Referees: Stavridis (GRE), Gómez (ESP)
27 September; 19:00	Score by quarters: 6–3, 3–3, 4–1, 4–1			Huanglong Swimming Center, Hangzhou; Referees: Stavridis (GRE), Gómez (ESP)
27 September; 19:00	Lu, Zhang Jin. 4	Goals	Khritankova 3	Huanglong Swimming Center, Hangzhou; Referees: Stavridis (GRE), Gómez (ESP)

28 September; 15:00	Singapore	7–6	Thailand	Huanglong Swimming Center, Hangzhou; Referees: Stavridis (GRE), Aimbetov (KAZ)
28 September; 15:00	Score by quarters: 1–2, 3–0, 2–3, 1–1			Huanglong Swimming Center, Hangzhou; Referees: Stavridis (GRE), Aimbetov (KAZ)
28 September; 15:00	Yap 3	Goals	Kwantongtanaree, Puengpongsakul, Rueangsappaisan 2	Huanglong Swimming Center, Hangzhou; Referees: Stavridis (GRE), Aimbetov (KAZ)

28 September; 16:30	South Korea	4–24	Kazakhstan	Huanglong Swimming Center, Hangzhou; Referees: Markova (UZB), Tan (SGP)
28 September; 16:30	Score by quarters: 1–3, 1–5, 1–6, 1–10			Huanglong Swimming Center, Hangzhou; Referees: Markova (UZB), Tan (SGP)
28 September; 16:30	Lee 2	Goals	Kaplun 6	Huanglong Swimming Center, Hangzhou; Referees: Markova (UZB), Tan (SGP)

28 September; 19:00	Uzbekistan	7–37	Japan	Huanglong Swimming Center, Hangzhou; Referees: Raković (SRB), An (KOR)
28 September; 19:00	Score by quarters: 3–8, 0–7, 1–10, 3–12			Huanglong Swimming Center, Hangzhou; Referees: Raković (SRB), An (KOR)
28 September; 19:00	Yusupova, Muratova 2	Goals	Arima 6	Huanglong Swimming Center, Hangzhou; Referees: Raković (SRB), An (KOR)

29 September; 15:00	Thailand	8–13	Kazakhstan	Huanglong Swimming Center, Hangzhou; Referees: Raković (SRB), Gómez (ESP)
29 September; 15:00	Score by quarters: 2–4, 2–3, 3–5, 1–1			Huanglong Swimming Center, Hangzhou; Referees: Raković (SRB), Gómez (ESP)
29 September; 15:00	Rueangsappaisan 4	Goals	Mirshina 4	Huanglong Swimming Center, Hangzhou; Referees: Raković (SRB), Gómez (ESP)

29 September; 16:30	Singapore	6–34	Japan	Huanglong Swimming Center, Hangzhou; Referees: Moller (ARG), An (KOR)
29 September; 16:30	Score by quarters: 2–9, 1–8, 2–10, 1–7			Huanglong Swimming Center, Hangzhou; Referees: Moller (ARG), An (KOR)
29 September; 16:30	Lee, Wan 2	Goals	Ura 7	Huanglong Swimming Center, Hangzhou; Referees: Moller (ARG), An (KOR)

29 September; 19:00	South Korea	3–29	China	Huanglong Swimming Center, Hangzhou; Referees: Puengpongsakul (THA), Moribayashi (JPN)
29 September; 19:00	Score by quarters: 0–7, 2–8, 0–8, 1–6			Huanglong Swimming Center, Hangzhou; Referees: Puengpongsakul (THA), Moribayashi (JPN)
29 September; 19:00	Lee 2	Goals	Xiong 8	Huanglong Swimming Center, Hangzhou; Referees: Puengpongsakul (THA), Moribayashi (JPN)

30 September; 15:00	Kazakhstan	14–23	Japan	Huanglong Swimming Center, Hangzhou; Referees: Raković (SRB), Moller (ARG)
30 September; 15:00	Score by quarters: 4–7, 1–2, 6–7, 3–7			Huanglong Swimming Center, Hangzhou; Referees: Raković (SRB), Moller (ARG)
30 September; 15:00	Mirshina 5	Goals	Arima 7	Huanglong Swimming Center, Hangzhou; Referees: Raković (SRB), Moller (ARG)

30 September; 16:30	Singapore	14–11	Uzbekistan	Huanglong Swimming Center, Hangzhou; Referees: Stavridis (GRE), Aimbetov (KAZ)
30 September; 16:30	Score by quarters: 4–2, 2–3, 5–3, 3–3			Huanglong Swimming Center, Hangzhou; Referees: Stavridis (GRE), Aimbetov (KAZ)
30 September; 16:30	Yap 6	Goals	Muratova 3	Huanglong Swimming Center, Hangzhou; Referees: Stavridis (GRE), Aimbetov (KAZ)

30 September; 19:00	Thailand	9–26	China	Huanglong Swimming Center, Hangzhou; Referees: Gómez (ESP), Markova (UZB)
30 September; 19:00	Score by quarters: 2–7, 3–5, 1–8, 3–6			Huanglong Swimming Center, Hangzhou; Referees: Gómez (ESP), Markova (UZB)
30 September; 19:00	Puengpongsakul 3	Goals	Lu 7	Huanglong Swimming Center, Hangzhou; Referees: Gómez (ESP), Markova (UZB)

1 October; 15:00	Thailand	20–7	South Korea	Huanglong Swimming Center, Hangzhou; Referees: Tan (SGP), Chen (CHN)
1 October; 15:00	Score by quarters: 5–2, 5–4, 6–1, 4–0			Huanglong Swimming Center, Hangzhou; Referees: Tan (SGP), Chen (CHN)
1 October; 15:00	P. Nilklad 4	Goals	Lee 3	Huanglong Swimming Center, Hangzhou; Referees: Tan (SGP), Chen (CHN)

1 October; 16:30	Kazakhstan	16–8	Uzbekistan	Huanglong Swimming Center, Hangzhou; Referees: Moller (ARG), Moribayashi (JPN)
1 October; 16:30	Score by quarters: 3–0, 3–4, 6–1, 4–3			Huanglong Swimming Center, Hangzhou; Referees: Moller (ARG), Moribayashi (JPN)
1 October; 16:30	Mirshina 5	Goals	Andryakhina, Muratova 2	Huanglong Swimming Center, Hangzhou; Referees: Moller (ARG), Moribayashi (JPN)

1 October; 19:00	Japan	11–24	China	Huanglong Swimming Center, Hangzhou; Referees: Stavridis (GRE), Gómez (ESP)
1 October; 19:00	Score by quarters: 1–6, 6–7, 2–6, 2–5			Huanglong Swimming Center, Hangzhou; Referees: Stavridis (GRE), Gómez (ESP)
1 October; 19:00	Kawaguchi 4	Goals	Yan J. 6	Huanglong Swimming Center, Hangzhou; Referees: Stavridis (GRE), Gómez (ESP)

== Final standing ==
Rank	Team	Pld	W	PW	PL	L
1st place, gold medalist(s)	China	6	6	0	0	0
2nd place, silver medalist(s)	Japan	6	5	0	0	1
3rd place, bronze medalist(s)	Kazakhstan	6	4	0	0	2
4	Singapore	6	3	0	0	3
5	Thailand	6	2	0	0	4
6	Uzbekistan	6	1	0	0	5
7	South Korea	6	0	0	0	6
