= Kako Kawaguchi =

Japanese water polo player (born 1999)

Personal information
- Full name: Hanako Kawaguchi
- Nationality: Japanese
- Born: 14 July 1999 (age 27)
- Height: 159 cm (63 in)
- Weight: 56 kg (123 lb)

Sport
- Sport: Water polo
Medal record
Representing Japan
Asian Games
Silver medal – second place	2022 Hangzhou	Team
Silver medal – second place	2026 Aichi–Nagoya	Team

Kako Kawaguchi (河口 華子; born 14 July 1999) is a Japanese water polo player. She was selected to the Japan women's national water polo team, for the 2020 Summer Olympics.

She participated at the 2015 All Japan Water Polo Championship, 2019 FINA Junior Water Polo World Championships, and 2019 FINA Women's Water Polo World League.
