= Akari Inaba =

Japanese water polo player (born 1998)

Personal information
- Nationality: Japan
- Born: February 2, 1998 (age 28)

Sport
- Sport: Water polo
Medal record
Women's water polo
Representing Japan
Asian Games
Silver medal – second place	2022 Hangzhou	Team
Silver medal – second place	2026 Aichi–Nagoya	Team
Bronze medal – third place	2018 Jakarta	Team
Summer Universiade
Bronze medal – third place	2017 Taipei	Team

Akari Inaba (稲場朱里, Inaba Akari; born 2 February 1998) is a Japanese water polo player. She competed in the 2020 Summer Olympics.
