= Yumi Arima =

Japanese water polo player (born 1997)

Personal information
- Full name: Yumi Arima
- Nationality: Japanese
- Born: 9 September 1997 (age 29)
- Height: 1.75 m (5 ft 9 in)

Sport
- Sport: Water polo
Medal record
Women's water polo
Representing Japan
Asian Games
| Silver medal – second place | 2022 Hangzhou | Team |
| Silver medal – second place | 2026 Aichi–Nagoya | Team |
| Bronze medal – third place | 2018 Jakarta | Team |
Summer Universiade
| Bronze medal – third place | 2017 Taipei | Team |

Yumi Arima (有馬 優美, Arima Yūmi; born 9 September 1997) is a Japanese water polo player who was ranked 7th in the overall Top Scorers at the 2017 World Championships and 3rd at the 2019 World Championships. She was part of the team in the women's water polo tournament at the 2020 Summer Olympics.
