= 2025 Asian Water Polo Championship =

Water polo competition in Zhaoqing, China

- Host city: Zhaoqing, China
- Dates: 25 February – 2 March

The 2025 Asian Water Polo Championship were held from 25 February to 2 March 2025 in Zhaoqing, China. It was the Asian continental qualification for the 2025 World Aquatics Championships.

== Men's tournament ==
=== Preliminary round ===
==== Group A ====
Pos	Team	Pld	W	PW	PL	L	GF	GA	GD	Pts	Qualification
1	China	3	3	0	0	0	65	22	+43	9	Quarterfinals
2	Kazakhstan	3	2	0	0	1	52	24	+28	6	Quarterfinals
3	Singapore	3	1	0	0	2	38	52	−14	3	Quarterfinals
4	Hong Kong	3	0	0	0	3	19	76	−57	0	Quarterfinals

Rules for classification: 1) Points; 2) Head-to-head points; 3) Head-to-head goal difference; 4) Head-to-head goals scored; 5) Goal difference.

25 February 2025; 15:00	Singapore	21–10	Hong Kong

25 February 2025; 17:00	Kazakhstan	8–12	China

26 February 2025; 17:00	Singapore	8–24	China

26 February 2025; 18:30	Hong Kong	3–26	Kazakhstan

27 February 2025; 17:00	China	29–6	Hong Kong

27 February 2025; 18:30	Kazakhstan	18–9	Singapore

==== Group B ====
Pos	Team	Pld	W	PW	PL	L	GF	GA	GD	Pts	Qualification
1	Japan	4	4	0	0	0	115	33	+82	12	Quarterfinals
2	Iran	4	3	0	0	1	101	36	+65	9	Quarterfinals
3	South Korea	4	2	0	0	2	68	68	0	6	Quarterfinals
4	Uzbekistan	4	1	0	0	3	59	100	−41	3	Quarterfinals
5	Chinese Taipei	4	0	0	0	4	17	123	−106	0	

Rules for classification: 1) Points; 2) Head-to-head points; 3) Head-to-head goal difference; 4) Head-to-head goals scored; 5) Goal difference.

25 February 2025; 09:00	South Korea	6–19	Iran

25 February 2025; 10:30	Chinese Taipei	8–30	Uzbekistan

25 February 2025; 18:30	South Korea	12–34	Japan

25 February 2025; 20:00	Iran	37–5	Chinese Taipei

26 February 2025; 11:00	Uzbekistan	9–33	Iran

26 February 2025; 12:30	Chinese Taipei	1–29	Japan

26 February 2025; 20:00	South Korea	23–12	Uzbekistan

27 February 2025; 11:00	Japan	16–12	Iran

27 February 2025; 12:30	South Korea	27–3	Chinese Taipei

27 February 2025; 20:00	Uzbekistan	8–36	Japan

=== Final round ===
Quarterfinals
28 February
China	37
Uzbekistan	5
28 February
Singapore	7
Iran	14
28 February
Kazakhstan	22
South Korea	9
28 February
Hong Kong	7
Japan	27

Semifinals
1 March
China (PSO)	9 (4)
Iran	9 (1)
1 March
Kazakhstan	10
Japan	18

Final
2 March
China	11
Japan	14
Bronze medal match
2 March
Iran	12 (2)
Kazakhstan (PSO)	12 (4)

Classification 5th–8th
1 March
Uzbekistan	13
Singapore	22
1 March
South Korea	19
Hong Kong	9

5th place match
2 March
Singapore	11
South Korea	19
7th place match
2 March
Uzbekistan	13 (7)
Hong Kong (PSO)	13 (8)

==== Quarterfinals ====
28 February 2025; 15:30	Kazakhstan	22–9	South Korea

28 February 2025; 17:00	Singapore	7–14	Iran

28 February 2025; 18:30	China	37–5	Uzbekistan

28 February 2025; 20:00	Hong Kong	7–27	Japan

==== Classification 5th–8th ====
1 March 2025; 17:00	South Korea	19–9	Hong Kong

1 March 2025; 20:00	Uzbekistan	13–22	Singapore

==== Semifinals ====
1 March 2025; 15:30	Kazakhstan	10–18	Japan

1 March 2025; 18:30	China	13–10 (PSO)	Iran

==== 7th place match ====
2 March 2025; 15:30	Uzbekistan	20–21 (PSO)	Hong Kong

==== 5th place match ====
2 March 2025; 17:00	Singapore	11–19	South Korea

==== Bronze medal match ====
2 March 2025; 18:30	Iran	14–16 (PSO)	Kazakhstan

==== Final ====
2 March 2025; 20:00	China	11–14	Japan

=== Final ranking ===
Rank	Team
1st place, gold medalist(s)	Japan
2nd place, silver medalist(s)	China
3rd place, bronze medalist(s)	Kazakhstan
4	Iran
5	South Korea
6	Singapore
7	Hong Kong
8	Uzbekistan
9	Chinese Taipei

Qualified for the 2025 World Championships

== Women's tournament ==
=== Standings ===
Pos	Team	Pld	W	PW	PL	L	GF	GA	GD	Pts
1	China	5	4	1	0	0	124	36	+88	14
2	Japan	5	4	0	1	0	124	44	+80	13
3	Kazakhstan	5	3	0	0	2	63	65	−2	9
4	Singapore	5	2	0	0	3	47	71	−24	6
5	Uzbekistan	5	1	0	0	4	49	106	−57	3
6	Hong Kong	5	0	0	0	5	28	113	−85	0

Rules for classification: 1) Points; 2) Head-to-head points; 3) Head-to-head goal difference; 4) Head-to-head goals scored; 5) Goal difference.

=== Results ===
All times are local (UTC+8).

25 February 2025; 12:00	China	33–3	Hong Kong

25 February 2025; 13:30	Kazakhstan	12–6	Singapore

26 February 2025; 14:00	Japan	34–7	Uzbekistan

26 February 2025; 15:30	Kazakhstan	25–6	Hong Kong

27 February 2025; 14:00	Singapore	11–24	Japan

27 February 2025; 15:30	China	29–7	Uzbekistan

28 February 2025; 11:00	Singapore	16–8	Uzbekistan

28 February 2025; 12:30	Japan	23–1	Hong Kong

28 February 2025; 14:00	Kazakhstan	6–21	China

1 March 2025; 11:00	Hong Kong	14–21	Uzbekistan

1 March 2025; 12:30	China	23–3	Singapore

1 March 2025; 14:00	Japan	26–7	Kazakhstan

2 March 2025; 10:30	Hong Kong	4–11	Singapore

2 March 2025; 12:00	Uzbekistan	6–13	Kazakhstan

2 March 2025; 13:30	China	18–17 (PSO)	Japan
