= Asian Water Polo Championship =

Water polo tournament

The Asian Water Polo Championship is an international water polo tournament, organized by Asia Swimming Federation (AASF). It has been the Asian continental qualification for the Olympic water polo tournament since 2012.

== Results ==
Part of the Asian Aquatics Championships

=== Men ===
Year	Host	Final			Third place match			Teams
Year	Host	Winner	Score	Runner-up	3rd place	Score	4th place	Teams
1984	(South Korea); Seoul	South Korea	10–8	Japan	Iran	24–1	Thailand	7
1988	(China); Guangzhou	China	No playoffs	Japan	South Korea	No playoffs	Singapore	6
1991	(Japan); Fukuoka	China	14–10	Japan	South Korea	12–11	Singapore	10
1995	(Thailand); Bangkok	Kazakhstan		China	Iran	9–5	South Korea	13
2000	(South Korea); Busan	Kazakhstan	12–4	China	Uzbekistan	11–4	South Korea	7
2005	(China); Shunde	China	6–5	Japan	Kazakhstan	9–3	Uzbekistan	8
2009	(China); Changshu	China	No playoffs	Kazakhstan	Japan	No playoffs	Kuwait	6
2012	(Japan); Tokyo	Kazakhstan	No playoffs	China	Japan	No playoffs	Kuwait	4
2012	(United Arab Emirates); Dubai	China	9–9 OT (4–2) pen	Kazakhstan	Japan	18–5	Singapore	9
2015	(China); Foshan	Japan	No playoffs	China	Kazakhstan	No playoffs	Iran	5
2016	(Japan); Tokyo	Japan	7–6	Kazakhstan	China	7–7 (4–1) pen	Iran	8
2022	(Thailand); Samut Prakan	Japan	10–7	China	Kazakhstan	8–5	Iran	10
2023	Singapore	China	11–8	Iran	Kazakhstan	18–7	Thailand	8
2025	(China); Zhaoqing	Japan	14–11	China	Kazakhstan	12–12 (4–2) pen	Iran	9
2025	(India); Ahmedabad	China	11–11 (5–4) pen	Iran	Kazakhstan	16–14	Japan	9

=== Women ===
Year	Host	Final			Third place match			Teams
Year	Host	Winner	Score	Runner-up	3rd place	Score	4th place	Teams
2009	(China); Changshu	China	No playoffs	Kazakhstan	Uzbekistan	No playoffs	Singapore	4
2012	(Japan); Tokyo	China	No playoffs	Kazakhstan	Japan	Only three teams participated		3
2012	(United Arab Emirates); Dubai	China	No playoffs	Kazakhstan	Uzbekistan	No playoffs	Singapore	7
2015	(China); Foshan	China	14–8; 9–6	Japan	Only two teams participated			2
2016	(Japan); Tokyo	China	No playoffs	Japan	Kazakhstan	No playoffs	Uzbekistan	7
2022	(Thailand); Samut Prakan	China	17–5	Japan	Kazakhstan	14–5	Thailand	6
2023	Singapore	Kazakhstan	No playoffs	Thailand	Uzbekistan	No playoffs	Singapore	4
2025	(China); Zhaoqing	China	No playoffs	Japan	Kazakhstan	No playoffs	Singapore	6
2025	(India); Ahmedabad	China	22–17	Japan	Kazakhstan	6–6 (3–2) pen	Thailand	8

== See also ==
- Water polo at the Asian Games
- Asian Aquatics Championships
- Asian Water Polo Cup
