= Water polo at the 2026 Asian Games – Men's tournament =

Men's water polo at the 2026 Asian Games
- Venues: Nippon Gaishi Hall Rainbow Pool
- Dates: 26 September–3 October 2026
- Competitors: 119 from 8 nations

Medalists
gold medal	Japan
silver medal	Kazakhstan
bronze medal	China

The men's tournament of water polo at the 2026 Asian Games in Nagoya, Japan was held from 26 September to 3 October 2026.

== Schedule ==
The schedule of the tournament is as follows.

G	Group phase	¼	Quarterfinals	½	Semifinals	B	Bronze medal match	F	Gold medal match

26th Sat	27th Sun	28th Mon	29th Tue	30th Wed	1st Thu	2nd Fri	3rd Sat	
G	G	G	¼	¼		½	B	F

== Squads ==
Eight competing national delegations finalized their roster profiles for the team competition program.

China	Hong Kong	Iran	Japan
Wu Honghui; Liu Yu; Zhao Yuehao; Yang Yiheng; He Xingmeng; Lyu Zikang; Chen Zhongxian; Ouyang Haiyuan; Zhu Beile; Yang Shanglin; Cai Yuhao; Shen Dingsong; Liang Zhiwei; Li Wanxiang; Li Diheng	Liu Yeu Yen Ians; Ching Tsz Shun; Fung Kong Chun; Fung Kong Ching; Yuen Shing Yau; Cheung Cheuk Hei; Tsang Ho Lam; Cheng Hei Man; Ho Jason; Choi Hin Kit Gilman; Zhang Tsz Hin; Cheng Hei Chun; Chan Lut Yin; Lee Tsz Wun Matthew; Chan Leong Medwin	Hamed Karimi; Omid Aghaei Karim; Alireza Mehrikohneshahri; Farbod Behzadsabouri; Mersad Adham; Ashkan Iranpouritari; Peyman Asadi Aghajari; Mehdi Yazdankhah; Amirreza Jalilpour; Amin Ghavidelhajiagha; Arman Shams; Seyederfan Sadrnia; Amirata Khazaei; Mahdi Barzegarisharifabad; Ali Abolghasemi	Towa Nishimura; Seiya Adachi; Taiyo Watanabe; Daichi Ogihara; Enishi Ura; Yuki Moriya; Kiyomu Date; Mitsuru Takata; Ikkei Nitta; Yusuke Inaba; Toi Suzuki; Kenta Araki; Ren Sasano; Jun Lowrey; Kai Inoue
Kazakhstan	South Korea	Singapore	Thailand
Temirlan Balfanbayev; Eduard Tsoy; Ruslan Akhmetov; Dushan Markovich; Nurassyl Satbergen; Alexey Shmider; Murat Shakenov; Srdjan Vuksanovich; Rustam Ukumanov; Mikhail Ruday; Yulian Verdesh; Sultan Shonzhigitov; Akzhan Aday; Adil Baltabekuly; Yegor Beloussov	Lee Jin-woo; Son Jung-wook; Yun Si-woo; Hwang Jeong-yun; Gwon Dae-yong; Jeon Gi-jae; Kwon Tae-woo; Park Seong-hun; Han Hyo-min; Yong Woo-seok; Kim Chan-su; Kang Min-su; Lee Si-deok; Kim Sung-hoon	Lee Darren Jit An; Loh Zhi Zhi; Goh Matthias Zoltin; Goh Wen Zhe; Chow Yong Jun; Chan Derek Wen Kai; Chan Dominic Bo Xun; Saik Justin Kin Yan; Sanjiv Rajandra; Lee Jia Jun Isaac; Lee Cheng Kang; Koh Jian Ying; Chou Hsiang Ken; Lok Shaunn Blasius Jun Jie; Zahar Shmelev	Sutthiyarn Pongprayoon; Suteenan Kaewmanee; Jiramate Paedpeenong; Pokpong Chansuwan; Jeerapat Chokratrapha; Pannatorn Khaekram; Kittikorn Kongboonkerd; Sorawit Borisut; Watcharawarong Ekchaona; Pattanit Chompoosang; Phongsathon Chainiyom; Chanon Khramyoo; Chanoknan Kaewmanee; Manaphat Thanasiriporn; Krittin Lekhakula

== Draw ==
The draw for the men's tournament was held on 23 July 2026.

Group A
Pos	Team
A1	Thailand
A2	Kazakhstan
A3	Japan
A4	Hong Kong

Group B
Pos	Team
B1	South Korea
B2	Iran
B3	Singapore
B4	China

== Group stage ==
All times are local, Japan Standard Time (UTC+9).

=== Group A ===
Pos	Team	Pld	W	PSW	PSL	L	GF	GA	GD	Pts	Qualification
1	Japan (H)	3	3	0	0	0	79	21	+58	9	Quarterfinals
2	Kazakhstan	3	2	0	0	1	61	40	+21	6	Quarterfinals
3	Hong Kong	3	1	0	0	2	45	74	−29	3	Quarterfinals
4	Thailand	3	0	0	0	3	25	75	−50	0	Quarterfinals

Source: Groups
(H) Host

26 September 2026; 15:50	Report	Thailand	15–24	Hong Kong	Nippon Gaishi Hall Rainbow Pool, Nagoya; Referees: Ruben Sap (NED), Zhang Liang (CHN)
26 September 2026; 15:50	Report	Score by quarters: 3–7, 5–4, 4–6, 3–7			Nippon Gaishi Hall Rainbow Pool, Nagoya; Referees: Ruben Sap (NED), Zhang Liang (CHN)
26 September 2026; 15:50	Report	Chainiyom 5	Goals	Cheng H.M. 6	Nippon Gaishi Hall Rainbow Pool, Nagoya; Referees: Ruben Sap (NED), Zhang Liang (CHN)

26 September 2026; 19:00	Report	Kazakhstan	11–19	Japan	Nippon Gaishi Hall Rainbow Pool, Nagoya; Referees: David Gómez (ESP), Alessia Ferrari (ITA)
26 September 2026; 19:00	Report	Score by quarters: 2–4, 1–5, 1–4, 7–6			Nippon Gaishi Hall Rainbow Pool, Nagoya; Referees: David Gómez (ESP), Alessia Ferrari (ITA)
26 September 2026; 19:00	Report	Vuksanović 4	Goals	Watanabe 6	Nippon Gaishi Hall Rainbow Pool, Nagoya; Referees: David Gómez (ESP), Alessia Ferrari (ITA)

27 September 2026; 17:25	Report	Kazakhstan	29–15	Hong Kong	Nippon Gaishi Hall Rainbow Pool, Nagoya; Referees: Alessia Ferrari (ITA), Jeremy Cheng (SGP)
27 September 2026; 17:25	Report	Score by quarters: 8–3, 9–4, 6–1, 6–7			Nippon Gaishi Hall Rainbow Pool, Nagoya; Referees: Alessia Ferrari (ITA), Jeremy Cheng (SGP)
27 September 2026; 17:25	Report	Shonzhigitov 6	Goals	Cheng H.M., Zhang 3	Nippon Gaishi Hall Rainbow Pool, Nagoya; Referees: Alessia Ferrari (ITA), Jeremy Cheng (SGP)

27 September 2026; 19:00	Report	Thailand	4–30	Japan	Nippon Gaishi Hall Rainbow Pool, Nagoya; Referees: Shahriar Assar (IRI), An Jin-yong (KOR)
27 September 2026; 19:00	Report	Score by quarters: 0–9, 2–3, 0–8, 2–10			Nippon Gaishi Hall Rainbow Pool, Nagoya; Referees: Shahriar Assar (IRI), An Jin-yong (KOR)
27 September 2026; 19:00	Report	four players 1	Goals	Watanabe 7	Nippon Gaishi Hall Rainbow Pool, Nagoya; Referees: Shahriar Assar (IRI), An Jin-yong (KOR)

28 September 2026; 15:50	Report	Kazakhstan	21–6	Thailand	Nippon Gaishi Hall Rainbow Pool, Nagoya; Referees: Shuhei Fukaya (JPN), Tigran Simonyan (HKG)
28 September 2026; 15:50	Report	Score by quarters: 5–0, 5–0, 6–1, 6–5			Nippon Gaishi Hall Rainbow Pool, Nagoya; Referees: Shuhei Fukaya (JPN), Tigran Simonyan (HKG)
28 September 2026; 15:50	Report	Akhmetov, Baltabekuly 4	Goals	Chompoosang, Lekhakula 2	Nippon Gaishi Hall Rainbow Pool, Nagoya; Referees: Shuhei Fukaya (JPN), Tigran Simonyan (HKG)

28 September 2026; 19:00	Report	Japan	30–6	Hong Kong	Nippon Gaishi Hall Rainbow Pool, Nagoya; Referees: Zhang Liang (CHN), Aussawin Wajangam (THA)
28 September 2026; 19:00	Report	Score by quarters: 6–0, 9–2, 6–2, 9–2			Nippon Gaishi Hall Rainbow Pool, Nagoya; Referees: Zhang Liang (CHN), Aussawin Wajangam (THA)
28 September 2026; 19:00	Report	Inaba 5	Goals	six players 1	Nippon Gaishi Hall Rainbow Pool, Nagoya; Referees: Zhang Liang (CHN), Aussawin Wajangam (THA)

=== Group B ===
Pos	Team	Pld	W	PSW	PSL	L	GF	GA	GD	Pts	Qualification
1	China	3	2	0	0	1	42	31	+11	6 (Note: Iran 8–12 China)	Quarterfinals
2	Iran	3	2	0	0	1	42	31	+11	6	Quarterfinals
3	South Korea	3	1	0	1	1	40	43	−3	4	Quarterfinals
4	Singapore	3	0	1	0	2	30	49	−19	2	Quarterfinals

Source: Groups
Notes:

26 September 2026; 14:15	Report	South Korea	15–14	China	Nippon Gaishi Hall Rainbow Pool, Nagoya; Referees: Georgios Stavridis (GRE), Shuhei Fukaya (JPN)
26 September 2026; 14:15	Report	Score by quarters: 3–1, 3–4, 4–5, 5–4			Nippon Gaishi Hall Rainbow Pool, Nagoya; Referees: Georgios Stavridis (GRE), Shuhei Fukaya (JPN)
26 September 2026; 14:15	Report	Han 4	Goals	Cai 4	Nippon Gaishi Hall Rainbow Pool, Nagoya; Referees: Georgios Stavridis (GRE), Shuhei Fukaya (JPN)

26 September 2026; 17:25	Report	Iran	19–8	Singapore	Nippon Gaishi Hall Rainbow Pool, Nagoya; Referees: Andrej Franulović (CRO), Adil Aimbetov (KAZ)
26 September 2026; 17:25	Report	Score by quarters: 5–2, 5–1, 4–3, 5–2			Nippon Gaishi Hall Rainbow Pool, Nagoya; Referees: Andrej Franulović (CRO), Adil Aimbetov (KAZ)
26 September 2026; 17:25	Report	three players 3	Goals	De. Chan, Saik 2	Nippon Gaishi Hall Rainbow Pool, Nagoya; Referees: Andrej Franulović (CRO), Adil Aimbetov (KAZ)

27 September 2026; 14:15	Report	South Korea	14–14; PSO: 2–4	Singapore	Nippon Gaishi Hall Rainbow Pool, Nagoya; Referees: Georgios Stavridis (GRE), Ruben Sap (NED)
27 September 2026; 14:15	Report	Score by quarters: 3–3, 1–5, 4–1, 6–5			Nippon Gaishi Hall Rainbow Pool, Nagoya; Referees: Georgios Stavridis (GRE), Ruben Sap (NED)
27 September 2026; 14:15	Report	Kwon 4	Goals	De. Chan 4	Nippon Gaishi Hall Rainbow Pool, Nagoya; Referees: Georgios Stavridis (GRE), Ruben Sap (NED)

27 September 2026; 15:50	Report	Iran	8–12	China	Nippon Gaishi Hall Rainbow Pool, Nagoya; Referees: Andrej Franulović (CRO), David Gómez (ESP)
27 September 2026; 15:50	Report	Score by quarters: 2–4, 4–3, 2–3, 0–2			Nippon Gaishi Hall Rainbow Pool, Nagoya; Referees: Andrej Franulović (CRO), David Gómez (ESP)
27 September 2026; 15:50	Report	Iranpour 3	Goals	Cai 5	Nippon Gaishi Hall Rainbow Pool, Nagoya; Referees: Andrej Franulović (CRO), David Gómez (ESP)

28 September 2026; 14:15	Report	Iran	15–11	South Korea	Nippon Gaishi Hall Rainbow Pool, Nagoya; Referees: David Gómez (ESP), Alessia Ferrari (ITA)
28 September 2026; 14:15	Report	Score by quarters: 4–4, 2–2, 6–2, 3–3			Nippon Gaishi Hall Rainbow Pool, Nagoya; Referees: David Gómez (ESP), Alessia Ferrari (ITA)
28 September 2026; 14:15	Report	Shams 4	Goals	Kim S., Yong 3	Nippon Gaishi Hall Rainbow Pool, Nagoya; Referees: David Gómez (ESP), Alessia Ferrari (ITA)

28 September 2026; 17:25	Report	Singapore	8–16	China	Nippon Gaishi Hall Rainbow Pool, Nagoya; Referees: Ruben Sap (NED), Andrej Franulović (CRO)
28 September 2026; 17:25	Report	Score by quarters: 2–2, 2–6, 1–3, 3–5			Nippon Gaishi Hall Rainbow Pool, Nagoya; Referees: Ruben Sap (NED), Andrej Franulović (CRO)
28 September 2026; 17:25	Report	three players 2	Goals	Chen 6	Nippon Gaishi Hall Rainbow Pool, Nagoya; Referees: Ruben Sap (NED), Andrej Franulović (CRO)

== Knockout stage ==
=== Bracket ===
Quarterfinals
29 September
Kazakhstan	18
South Korea	14
30 September
China	26
Thailand	4
29 September
Iran	21
Hong Kong	12
30 September
Japan	32
Singapore	8

Semifinals
2 October
Kazakhstan	11
China	10
2 October
Iran	12
Japan	26

Gold medal
3 October
Kazakhstan	7
Japan	24
Bronze medal
3 October
China	13
Iran	9

5–8th place semifinals
2 October
South Korea	22
Thailand	11
2 October
Hong Kong	15
Singapore	11

Fifth place
3 October
South Korea	16
Hong Kong	15
Seventh place
3 October
Thailand	14
Singapore	24

=== Quarterfinals ===
29 September 2026; 15:50	Report	Iran	21–12	Hong Kong	Nippon Gaishi Hall Rainbow Pool, Nagoya; Referees: Adil Aimbetov (KAZ), Jeremy Cheng (SGP)
29 September 2026; 15:50	Report	Score by quarters: 4–1, 6–3, 5–5, 6–3			Nippon Gaishi Hall Rainbow Pool, Nagoya; Referees: Adil Aimbetov (KAZ), Jeremy Cheng (SGP)
29 September 2026; 15:50	Report	Abolghasemi 5	Goals	Cheung 3	Nippon Gaishi Hall Rainbow Pool, Nagoya; Referees: Adil Aimbetov (KAZ), Jeremy Cheng (SGP)

29 September 2026; 17:25	Report	Kazakhstan	18–14	South Korea	Nippon Gaishi Hall Rainbow Pool, Nagoya; Referees: Georgios Stavridis (GRE), Ruben Sap (NED)
29 September 2026; 17:25	Report	Score by quarters: 4–3, 5–3, 7–4, 2–4			Nippon Gaishi Hall Rainbow Pool, Nagoya; Referees: Georgios Stavridis (GRE), Ruben Sap (NED)
29 September 2026; 17:25	Report	Ruday, Vuksanović 4	Goals	Yong 4	Nippon Gaishi Hall Rainbow Pool, Nagoya; Referees: Georgios Stavridis (GRE), Ruben Sap (NED)

30 September 2026; 15:50	Report	China	26–4	Thailand	Nippon Gaishi Hall Rainbow Pool, Nagoya; Referees: Shahriar Assar (IRI), Tigran Simonyan (HKG)
30 September 2026; 15:50	Report	Score by quarters: 7–1, 5–1, 8–0, 6–2			Nippon Gaishi Hall Rainbow Pool, Nagoya; Referees: Shahriar Assar (IRI), Tigran Simonyan (HKG)
30 September 2026; 15:50	Report	five players 3	Goals	Khaekram 2	Nippon Gaishi Hall Rainbow Pool, Nagoya; Referees: Shahriar Assar (IRI), Tigran Simonyan (HKG)

30 September 2026; 17:25	Report	Japan	32–8	Singapore	Nippon Gaishi Hall Rainbow Pool, Nagoya; Referees: Zhang Liang (CHN), Ruben Sap (NED)
30 September 2026; 17:25	Report	Score by quarters: 9–1, 8–3, 7–1, 8–3			Nippon Gaishi Hall Rainbow Pool, Nagoya; Referees: Zhang Liang (CHN), Ruben Sap (NED)
30 September 2026; 17:25	Report	three players 5	Goals	M. Goh 3	Nippon Gaishi Hall Rainbow Pool, Nagoya; Referees: Zhang Liang (CHN), Ruben Sap (NED)

=== 5–8th place semifinals ===
2 October 2026; 14:15	Report	South Korea	22–11	Thailand	Nippon Gaishi Hall Rainbow Pool, Nagoya; Referees: Adil Aimbetov (KAZ), Shahriar Assar (IRI)
2 October 2026; 14:15	Report	Score by quarters: 5–4, 7–3, 5–1, 5–3			Nippon Gaishi Hall Rainbow Pool, Nagoya; Referees: Adil Aimbetov (KAZ), Shahriar Assar (IRI)
2 October 2026; 14:15	Report	Kwon 7	Goals	S. Kaewmanee 4	Nippon Gaishi Hall Rainbow Pool, Nagoya; Referees: Adil Aimbetov (KAZ), Shahriar Assar (IRI)

2 October 2026; 15:50	Report	Hong Kong	15–11	Singapore	Nippon Gaishi Hall Rainbow Pool, Nagoya; Referees: Zhang Liang (CHN), Shuhei Fukaya (JPN)
2 October 2026; 15:50	Report	Score by quarters: 4–2, 4–3, 5–3, 2–3			Nippon Gaishi Hall Rainbow Pool, Nagoya; Referees: Zhang Liang (CHN), Shuhei Fukaya (JPN)
2 October 2026; 15:50	Report	Cheng H.M., Tsang 3	Goals	three players 2	Nippon Gaishi Hall Rainbow Pool, Nagoya; Referees: Zhang Liang (CHN), Shuhei Fukaya (JPN)

=== Semifinals ===
2 October 2026; 17:25	Report	Kazakhstan	11–10	China	Nippon Gaishi Hall Rainbow Pool, Nagoya; Referees: Andrej Franulović (CRO), David Gómez (ESP)
2 October 2026; 17:25	Report	Score by quarters: 1–2, 3–2, 5–4, 2–2			Nippon Gaishi Hall Rainbow Pool, Nagoya; Referees: Andrej Franulović (CRO), David Gómez (ESP)
2 October 2026; 17:25	Report	Shakenov 3	Goals	Chen 5	Nippon Gaishi Hall Rainbow Pool, Nagoya; Referees: Andrej Franulović (CRO), David Gómez (ESP)

2 October 2026; 19:00	Report	Iran	12–26	Japan	Nippon Gaishi Hall Rainbow Pool, Nagoya; Referees: Georgios Stavridis (GRE), Alessia Ferrari (ITA)
2 October 2026; 19:00	Report	Score by quarters: 1–7, 3–6, 4–8, 4–5			Nippon Gaishi Hall Rainbow Pool, Nagoya; Referees: Georgios Stavridis (GRE), Alessia Ferrari (ITA)
2 October 2026; 19:00	Report	Yazdankhah 4	Goals	Ogihara 7	Nippon Gaishi Hall Rainbow Pool, Nagoya; Referees: Georgios Stavridis (GRE), Alessia Ferrari (ITA)

=== Seventh place game ===
3 October 2026; 14:15	Report	Thailand	14–24	Singapore	Nippon Gaishi Hall Rainbow Pool, Nagoya; Referees: Ruben Sap (NED), An Jin-yong (KOR)
3 October 2026; 14:15	Report	Score by quarters: 3–7, 5–6, 2–7, 4–4			Nippon Gaishi Hall Rainbow Pool, Nagoya; Referees: Ruben Sap (NED), An Jin-yong (KOR)
3 October 2026; 14:15	Report	S. Kaewmanee 5	Goals	Rajandra 6	Nippon Gaishi Hall Rainbow Pool, Nagoya; Referees: Ruben Sap (NED), An Jin-yong (KOR)

=== Fifth place game ===
3 October 2026; 15:50	Report	South Korea	16–15	Hong Kong	Nippon Gaishi Hall Rainbow Pool, Nagoya; Referees: Zhang Liang (CHN), Shuhei Fukaya (JPN)
3 October 2026; 15:50	Report	Score by quarters: 3–1, 6–5, 4–5, 3–4			Nippon Gaishi Hall Rainbow Pool, Nagoya; Referees: Zhang Liang (CHN), Shuhei Fukaya (JPN)
3 October 2026; 15:50	Report	Gwon 5	Goals	Cheung, Choi 4	Nippon Gaishi Hall Rainbow Pool, Nagoya; Referees: Zhang Liang (CHN), Shuhei Fukaya (JPN)

=== Bronze medal game ===
3 October 2026; 17:25	Report	China	13–9	Iran	Nippon Gaishi Hall Rainbow Pool, Nagoya; Referees: Alessia Ferrari (ITA), David Gómez (ESP)
3 October 2026; 17:25	Report	Score by quarters: 4–2, 3–2, 4–2, 2–3			Nippon Gaishi Hall Rainbow Pool, Nagoya; Referees: Alessia Ferrari (ITA), David Gómez (ESP)
3 October 2026; 17:25	Report	Zhu 3	Goals	Abolghasemi, Yazdankhah 2	Nippon Gaishi Hall Rainbow Pool, Nagoya; Referees: Alessia Ferrari (ITA), David Gómez (ESP)

=== Gold medal game ===
3 October 2026; 19:00	Report	Kazakhstan	7–24	Japan	Nippon Gaishi Hall Rainbow Pool, Nagoya; Referees: Georgios Stavridis (GRE), Andrej Franulović (CRO)
3 October 2026; 19:00	Report	Score by quarters: 0–5, 2–8, 2–5, 3–6			Nippon Gaishi Hall Rainbow Pool, Nagoya; Referees: Georgios Stavridis (GRE), Andrej Franulović (CRO)
3 October 2026; 19:00	Report	Ruday 4	Goals	Moriya 5	Nippon Gaishi Hall Rainbow Pool, Nagoya; Referees: Georgios Stavridis (GRE), Andrej Franulović (CRO)

== Final standing ==
Rank	Team	Pld	W	PW	PL	L
1st place, gold medalist(s)	Japan	6	6	0	0	0
2nd place, silver medalist(s)	Kazakhstan	6	4	0	0	2
3rd place, bronze medalist(s)	China	6	4	0	0	2
4	Iran	6	3	0	0	3
5	South Korea	6	3	0	1	2
6	Hong Kong	6	2	0	0	4
7	Singapore	6	1	1	0	4
8	Thailand	6	0	0	0	6
