= Beach water polo at the 2014 Asian Beach Games =

- Venue: Karon Beach
- Dates: 18–22 November 2014

Beach water polo competition at the 2014 Asian Beach Games was held in Phuket, Thailand from 18 to 22 November 2014 at Karon Beach, Phuket.

Kazakhstan won the gold medal in a round robin competition, Iran won the silver medal and Kuwait finished third.

== Medalists ==
| Event | Gold | Silver | Bronze |
|---|---|---|---|
| Men | Kazakhstan; Alexandr Shvedov; Maxim Zhardan; Ravil Manafov; Miras Aubakirov; Viktor Salnichenko; Yevgeniy Medvedev | Iran; Sajjad Abdi; Hamed Malek-Khanbanan; Mohsen Jalili; Ataollah Barkhordi; Nima Khoshbakht; Ali Pirouzkhah; Amir Hossein Khani | Kuwait; Mohammad Al-Mulla; Ali Al-Mujadi; Marzouq Al-Ajmi; Ahmad Mandani; Mohammad Ashour; Jasem Al-Safran; Abdulaziz Saudoun |

== Results ==
| Pos | Team | Pld | W | D | L | GF | GA | GD | Pts |
|---|---|---|---|---|---|---|---|---|---|
| 1 | Kazakhstan | 5 | 4 | 0 | 1 | 67 | 23 | +44 | 8 |
| 2 | Iran | 5 | 4 | 0 | 1 | 79 | 48 | +31 | 8 |
| 3 | Kuwait | 5 | 4 | 0 | 1 | 54 | 44 | +10 | 8 |
| 4 | Indonesia | 5 | 2 | 0 | 3 | 41 | 59 | −18 | 4 |
| 5 | Thailand | 5 | 0 | 1 | 4 | 32 | 61 | −29 | 1 |
| 6 | Hong Kong | 5 | 0 | 1 | 4 | 27 | 65 | −38 | 1 |

Source: OCA

| 18 November; 15:00 | Thailand | 1–10 | Kazakhstan | Karon Beach, Phuket; Referees: Nader Ghafouri (IRI) |
| 18 November; 15:00 | Scoring by half: 0–2, 1–8 | | | Karon Beach, Phuket; Referees: Nader Ghafouri (IRI) |
| 18 November; 15:00 | Jarananon 1 | Goals | Zhardan 5 | Karon Beach, Phuket; Referees: Nader Ghafouri (IRI) |

| 18 November; 16:00 | Indonesia | 5–10 | Kuwait | Karon Beach, Phuket; Referees: Kazuhiko Makita (JPN) |
| 18 November; 16:00 | Scoring by half: 4–6, 1–4 | | | Karon Beach, Phuket; Referees: Kazuhiko Makita (JPN) |
| 18 November; 16:00 | Harahap 3 | Goals | Mandani, Ashour 4 | Karon Beach, Phuket; Referees: Kazuhiko Makita (JPN) |

| 18 November; 17:00 | Hong Kong | 6–19 | Iran | Karon Beach, Phuket; Referees: Meng Anlong (CHN) |
| 18 November; 17:00 | Scoring by half: 2–7, 4–12 | | | Karon Beach, Phuket; Referees: Meng Anlong (CHN) |
| 18 November; 17:00 | Po 2 | Goals | Malek-Khanbanan 5 | Karon Beach, Phuket; Referees: Meng Anlong (CHN) |

| 19 November; 10:00 | Kazakhstan | 13–5 | Kuwait | Karon Beach, Phuket; Referees: Kazuhiko Makita (JPN) |
| 19 November; 10:00 | Scoring by half: 7–3, 6–2 | | | Karon Beach, Phuket; Referees: Kazuhiko Makita (JPN) |
| 19 November; 10:00 | Medvedev 7 | Goals | Al-Mujadi 2 | Karon Beach, Phuket; Referees: Kazuhiko Makita (JPN) |

| 19 November; 10:45 | Iran | 16–10 | Indonesia | Karon Beach, Phuket; Referees: Tan Hong Boon (SIN) |
| 19 November; 10:45 | Scoring by half: 7–3, 9–7 | | | Karon Beach, Phuket; Referees: Tan Hong Boon (SIN) |
| 19 November; 10:45 | Barkhordi 4 | Goals | R. Putra 4 | Karon Beach, Phuket; Referees: Tan Hong Boon (SIN) |

| 19 November; 11:30 | Thailand | 9–9 | Hong Kong | Karon Beach, Phuket; Referees: Jovinus Carolus Legawa (INA) |
| 19 November; 11:30 | Scoring by half: 6–3, 3–6 | | | Karon Beach, Phuket; Referees: Jovinus Carolus Legawa (INA) |
| 19 November; 11:30 | Chaisombat 6 | Goals | Cheung 5 | Karon Beach, Phuket; Referees: Jovinus Carolus Legawa (INA) |

| 20 November; 10:00 | Kuwait | 16–15 | Iran | Karon Beach, Phuket; Referees: Meng Anlong (CHN) |
| 20 November; 10:00 | Scoring by half: 5–8, 11–7 | | | Karon Beach, Phuket; Referees: Meng Anlong (CHN) |
| 20 November; 10:00 | Saudoun 6 | Goals | Malek-Khanbanan, Barkhordi, Khani 4 | Karon Beach, Phuket; Referees: Meng Anlong (CHN) |

| 20 November; 10:45 | Hong Kong | 3–15 | Kazakhstan | Karon Beach, Phuket; Referees: Pinate Rerkasame (THA) |
| 20 November; 10:45 | Scoring by half: 3–9, 0–6 | | | Karon Beach, Phuket; Referees: Pinate Rerkasame (THA) |
| 20 November; 10:45 | To 3 | Goals | Manafov, Aubakirov, Medvedev 4 | Karon Beach, Phuket; Referees: Pinate Rerkasame (THA) |

| 20 November; 11:30 | Indonesia | 13–9 | Thailand | Karon Beach, Phuket; Referees: Nader Ghafouri (IRI) |
| 20 November; 11:30 | Scoring by half: 6–5, 7–4 | | | Karon Beach, Phuket; Referees: Nader Ghafouri (IRI) |
| 20 November; 11:30 | Legawa 7 | Goals | Chaisombat 4 | Karon Beach, Phuket; Referees: Nader Ghafouri (IRI) |

| 21 November; 10:00 | Kazakhstan | 9–11 | Iran | Karon Beach, Phuket; Referees: Tan Hong Boon (SIN) |
| 21 November; 10:00 | Scoring by half: 5–4, 4–7 | | | Karon Beach, Phuket; Referees: Tan Hong Boon (SIN) |
| 21 November; 10:00 | Zhardan 4 | Goals | Malek-Khanbanan 4 | Karon Beach, Phuket; Referees: Tan Hong Boon (SIN) |

| 21 November; 10:45 | Thailand | 6–11 | Kuwait | Karon Beach, Phuket; Referees: Kazuhiko Makita (JPN) |
| 21 November; 10:45 | Scoring by half: 3–3, 3–8 | | | Karon Beach, Phuket; Referees: Kazuhiko Makita (JPN) |
| 21 November; 10:45 | Jarananon 2 | Goals | Ashour 4 | Karon Beach, Phuket; Referees: Kazuhiko Makita (JPN) |

| 21 November; 11:30 | Hong Kong | 4–10 | Indonesia | Karon Beach, Phuket; Referees: Pinate Rerkasame (THA) |
| 21 November; 11:30 | Scoring by half: 1–4, 3–6 | | | Karon Beach, Phuket; Referees: Pinate Rerkasame (THA) |
| 21 November; 11:30 | Po 2 | Goals | Harahap, Respati 3 | Karon Beach, Phuket; Referees: Pinate Rerkasame (THA) |

| 22 November; 10:00 | Indonesia | 3–20 | Kazakhstan | Karon Beach, Phuket; Referees: Nader Ghafouri (IRI) |
| 22 November; 10:00 | Scoring by half: 0–10, 3–10 | | | Karon Beach, Phuket; Referees: Nader Ghafouri (IRI) |
| 22 November; 10:00 | Harahap 2 | Goals | Aubakirov, Medvedev 7 | Karon Beach, Phuket; Referees: Nader Ghafouri (IRI) |

| 22 November; 11:00 | Kuwait | 12–5 | Hong Kong | Karon Beach, Phuket; Referees: Pinate Rerkasame (THA) |
| 22 November; 11:00 | Scoring by half: 4–2, 8–3 | | | Karon Beach, Phuket; Referees: Pinate Rerkasame (THA) |
| 22 November; 11:00 | Al-Ajmi 3 | Goals | Cheng 3 | Karon Beach, Phuket; Referees: Pinate Rerkasame (THA) |

| 22 November; 11:30 | Thailand | 7–18 | Iran | Karon Beach, Phuket; Referees: Jovinus Carolus Legawa (INA) |
| 22 November; 11:30 | Scoring by half: 4–12, 3–6 | | | Karon Beach, Phuket; Referees: Jovinus Carolus Legawa (INA) |
| 22 November; 11:30 | Chaisombat 3 | Goals | Barkhordi 12 | Karon Beach, Phuket; Referees: Jovinus Carolus Legawa (INA) |
