= Bhutan at the 2014 Asian Beach Games =

- IOC code: BHU
- NOC: Bhutan Olympic Committee
- Website: bhutanolympiccommittee.org// (in English)

in Phuket
- Medals Ranked -th: Gold 0 Silver 0 Bronze 0 Total 0

Asian Beach Games appearances
- 2010; 2012; 2014; 2016

Bhutan participated in the 2014 Asian Beach Games held in Phuket, Thailand, from 14 to 23 November 2014. Bhutan competed in 3x3 Beach Basketball and sent 4 athletes but failed to win any medals.

== Medal summary ==
=== Medal by Sport ===
Medals by sport
Sport	1st place, gold medalist(s)	2nd place, silver medalist(s)	3rd place, bronze medalist(s)	Total
3x3 Beach Basketball	0	0	0	0
Total	0	0	0	0

=== Medal by Date ===
Medals by date
Day	Date	1st place, gold medalist(s)	2nd place, silver medalist(s)	3rd place, bronze medalist(s)	Total
–1	12 Nov	0	0	0	0
0	13 Nov	0	0	0	0
1	14 Nov	0	0	0	0
2	15 Nov	0	0	0	0
3	16 Nov	0	0	0	0
4	17 Nov	0	0	0	0
5	18 Nov	0	0	0	0
6	19 Nov	0	0	0	0
7	20 Nov	0	0	0	0
8	21 Nov	0	0	0	0
9	22 Nov	0	0	0	0
10	23 Nov	0	0	0	0
Total		0	0	0	0
