= Water polo at the 2018 Asian Games – Men's tournament =

Asian Games competition

Men at the 2018 Asian Games
- Venue: Gelora Bung Karno Aquatic Stadium
- Date: 25 August – 1 September 2018
- Competitors: 117 from 9 nations

Medalists
gold medal	Kazakhstan
silver medal	Japan
bronze medal	Iran

The men's tournament of Water polo at the 2018 Asian Games at Jakarta, Indonesia, was held from 25 August to 1 September at the Gelora Bung Karno Aquatic Stadium.

== Squads ==
China	Hong Kong	Indonesia	Iran
Wu Honghui; Liu Xiao; Peng Jiahao; Chu Chenghao; Sha Shi; Xie Zekai; Chen Zhongxian; Chen Rui; Chen Yimin; Chen Jinghao; Zhang Chufeng; Zhu Gelin; Liang Zhiwei	Yim Wai Ho; Wong Siu Hei; Fung Kong Chun; Fung Kong Ching; Kelvin Lo; Ip Chun Hong; Gilman Choi; Cheng Hei Man; Pin Tak Hei; Cheung Tsun Yu; Chan Chun Leung; Cheng Hei Chun; Kong Cheuk Kiu	Mochammad Rafi Alfariz; Beby Willy Eka Paksi Tarigan; Muhammad Hamid Firdaus; Silvester Goldberg Manik; Erlangga Andaru Rinaldi; Andi Muhammad Uwayzulqarni; Yusuf Budiman; Reza Aditya Putra; Delvin Felliciano; Ridjkie Mulia Harahap; Rian Rinaldo; Zaenal Arifin; Novian Dwi Putra	Omid Lotfpour; Peyman Asadi; Amir Hossein Rahbar; Hamed Malek-Khanbanan; Amir Hossein Keyhani; Ali Pirouzkhah; Amir Dehdari; Mehdi Yazdankhah; Soheil Rostamian; Mohammad Javad Abbasi; Arshia Almasi; Hossein Khaledi; Shayan Ghasemi
Japan	Kazakhstan	Saudi Arabia	Singapore
Katsuyuki Tanamura; Seiya Adachi; Harukiirario Koppu; Mitsuaki Shiga; Takuma Yoshida; Atsuto Iida; Takumu Miyazawa; Mitsuru Takata; Atsushi Arai; Yusuke Inaba; Keigo Okawa; Kenta Araki; Tomoyoshi Fukushima	Pavel Lipilin; Yevgeniy Medvedev; Ruslan Akhmetov; Roman Pilipenko; Miras Aubakirov; Alexey Shmider; Murat Shakenov; Altay Altayev; Rustam Ukumanov; Mikhail Ruday; Ravil Manafov; Yulian Verdesh; Valeriy Shlemov	Hussain Jazani; Mohammed Al-Hilal; Mohammed Gahal; Saeed Taleb; Naif Al-Muntashiri; Ayman Al-Aryani; Ahmed Al-Shammari; Khaled Al-Harbi; Hamed Al-Nefaiei; Bader Al-Dughather; Adel Al-Malki; Mohammed Al-Khawfi; Omar Sharahili	Darren Lee; Loh Zhi Zhi; Ooi Yee Jia; Chow Jing Lun; Glen Lim; Samuel Yu; Chiam Kun Yang; Ang An Jun; Yu Junjie; Sean Ang; Lee Cheng Kang; Koh Jian Ying; Lee Kai Yang
South Korea			
Lee Seung-hun; Park Jeong-min; Yoo Byeong-jin; Lee Seon-uk; Youn Young-gwan; Choi Jin-jae; Kim Dong-hyeok; Kim Moon-soo; Chu Min-jong; Han Hyo-min; Gwon Dae-yong; Lee Seong-gyu; Jung Byeong-young			

== Results ==
All times are Western Indonesia Time (UTC+07:00)

=== Preliminary round ===
==== Group A ====
Pos	Team	Pld	W	D	L	GF	GA	GD	Pts	Qualification
1	Kazakhstan	3	3	0	0	40	18	+22	6	Quarterfinals
2	Iran	3	2	0	1	32	25	+7	4	Quarterfinals
3	South Korea	3	1	0	2	30	39	−9	2	Quarterfinals
4	Singapore	3	0	0	3	16	36	−20	0	Quarterfinals

Source: OCA

25 August; 9:00	South Korea	9–16	Kazakhstan	Gelora Bung Karno Aquatic Stadium, Jakarta; Referees: Ni (CHN), Tahara (JPN)
25 August; 9:00	Score by quarters: 1–5, 1–5, 3–3, 4–3			Gelora Bung Karno Aquatic Stadium, Jakarta; Referees: Ni (CHN), Tahara (JPN)
25 August; 9:00	Kim D. 3	Goals	Ruday 3	Gelora Bung Karno Aquatic Stadium, Jakarta; Referees: Ni (CHN), Tahara (JPN)

25 August; 10:20	Singapore	5–11	Iran	Gelora Bung Karno Aquatic Stadium, Jakarta; Referees: Stavridis (GRE), Štampalija (CRO)
25 August; 10:20	Score by quarters: 3–4, 0–3, 2–3, 0–1			Gelora Bung Karno Aquatic Stadium, Jakarta; Referees: Stavridis (GRE), Štampalija (CRO)
25 August; 10:20	Koh 3	Goals	Yazdankhah, Abbasi 3	Gelora Bung Karno Aquatic Stadium, Jakarta; Referees: Stavridis (GRE), Štampalija (CRO)

26 August; 17:10	Iran	16–11	South Korea	Gelora Bung Karno Aquatic Stadium, Jakarta; Referees: Alexandrescu (ROU), Stavridis (GRE)
26 August; 17:10	Score by quarters: 5–3, 7–4, 1–2, 3–2			Gelora Bung Karno Aquatic Stadium, Jakarta; Referees: Alexandrescu (ROU), Stavridis (GRE)
26 August; 17:10	Malek-Khanbanan, Almasi 3	Goals	Youn, Lee S.G. 3	Gelora Bung Karno Aquatic Stadium, Jakarta; Referees: Alexandrescu (ROU), Stavridis (GRE)

27 August; 14:30	Kazakhstan	15–4	Singapore	Gelora Bung Karno Aquatic Stadium, Jakarta; Referees: Ni (CHN), Safabakhsh (IRI)
27 August; 14:30	Score by quarters: 4–0, 5–1, 4–2, 2–1			Gelora Bung Karno Aquatic Stadium, Jakarta; Referees: Ni (CHN), Safabakhsh (IRI)
27 August; 14:30	Ukumanov 5	Goals	four players 1	Gelora Bung Karno Aquatic Stadium, Jakarta; Referees: Ni (CHN), Safabakhsh (IRI)

28 August; 17:10	Kazakhstan	9–5	Iran	Gelora Bung Karno Aquatic Stadium, Jakarta; Referees: Štampalija (CRO), Stavridis (GRE)
28 August; 17:10	Score by quarters: 2–1, 2–1, 3–2, 2–1			Gelora Bung Karno Aquatic Stadium, Jakarta; Referees: Štampalija (CRO), Stavridis (GRE)
28 August; 17:10	Ukumanov 3	Goals	Pirouzkhah 2	Gelora Bung Karno Aquatic Stadium, Jakarta; Referees: Štampalija (CRO), Stavridis (GRE)

29 August; 14:30	Singapore	7–10	South Korea	Gelora Bung Karno Aquatic Stadium, Jakarta; Referees: Štampalija (CRO), Tahara (JPN)
29 August; 14:30	Score by quarters: 1–2, 1–4, 2–2, 3–2			Gelora Bung Karno Aquatic Stadium, Jakarta; Referees: Štampalija (CRO), Tahara (JPN)
29 August; 14:30	Koh 2	Goals	Chu 3	Gelora Bung Karno Aquatic Stadium, Jakarta; Referees: Štampalija (CRO), Tahara (JPN)

==== Group B ====
Pos	Team	Pld	W	D	L	GF	GA	GD	Pts	Qualification
1	Japan	4	4	0	0	79	15	+64	8	Quarterfinals
2	China	4	3	0	1	63	22	+41	6	Quarterfinals
3	Saudi Arabia	4	1	1	2	33	55	−22	3 (Note: Head-to-head result: KSA 12–12 INA. Goal difference against the highest placed team (JPN): KSA −16, INA −17.)	Quarterfinals
4	Indonesia	4	1	1	2	32	63	−31	3	Quarterfinals
5	Hong Kong	4	0	0	4	17	69	−52	0	

Source: OCA
Notes:

25 August; 15:00	Saudi Arabia	12–12	Indonesia	Gelora Bung Karno Aquatic Stadium, Jakarta; Referees: Safabakhsh (IRI), Flahive (AUS)
25 August; 15:00	Score by quarters: 1–3, 4–4, 3–4, 4–1			Gelora Bung Karno Aquatic Stadium, Jakarta; Referees: Safabakhsh (IRI), Flahive (AUS)
25 August; 15:00	Al-Dughather 6	Goals	Harahap 4	Gelora Bung Karno Aquatic Stadium, Jakarta; Referees: Safabakhsh (IRI), Flahive (AUS)

25 August; 16:20	Japan	12–4	China	Gelora Bung Karno Aquatic Stadium, Jakarta; Referees: Stavridis (GRE), Alexandrescu (ROU)
25 August; 16:20	Score by quarters: 2–1, 4–0, 3–1, 3–2			Gelora Bung Karno Aquatic Stadium, Jakarta; Referees: Stavridis (GRE), Alexandrescu (ROU)
25 August; 16:20	Adachi 3	Goals	four players 1	Gelora Bung Karno Aquatic Stadium, Jakarta; Referees: Stavridis (GRE), Alexandrescu (ROU)

26 August; 14:30	Indonesia	2–19	China	Gelora Bung Karno Aquatic Stadium, Jakarta; Referees: Tan (SGP), Flahive (AUS)
26 August; 14:30	Score by quarters: 0–4, 0–6, 0–4, 2–5			Gelora Bung Karno Aquatic Stadium, Jakarta; Referees: Tan (SGP), Flahive (AUS)
26 August; 14:30	Firdaus, Manik 1	Goals	Chen Z. 5	Gelora Bung Karno Aquatic Stadium, Jakarta; Referees: Tan (SGP), Flahive (AUS)

26 August; 15:50	Saudi Arabia	12–6	Hong Kong	Gelora Bung Karno Aquatic Stadium, Jakarta; Referees: Han (KOR), Salnichenko (KAZ)
26 August; 15:50	Score by quarters: 2–1, 4–1, 4–2, 2–2			Gelora Bung Karno Aquatic Stadium, Jakarta; Referees: Han (KOR), Salnichenko (KAZ)
26 August; 15:50	Al-Nefaiei 3	Goals	Cheng H.M. 3	Gelora Bung Karno Aquatic Stadium, Jakarta; Referees: Han (KOR), Salnichenko (KAZ)

27 August; 15:50	China	23–3	Hong Kong	Gelora Bung Karno Aquatic Stadium, Jakarta; Referees: Flahive (AUS), Pranolo (INA)
27 August; 15:50	Score by quarters: 7–0, 6–2, 5–0, 5–1			Gelora Bung Karno Aquatic Stadium, Jakarta; Referees: Flahive (AUS), Pranolo (INA)
27 August; 15:50	four players 3	Goals	Cheng H.M. 3	Gelora Bung Karno Aquatic Stadium, Jakarta; Referees: Flahive (AUS), Pranolo (INA)

27 August; 17:10	Indonesia	7–24	Japan	Gelora Bung Karno Aquatic Stadium, Jakarta; Referees: Jiathornwattana (THA), Štampalija (CRO)
27 August; 17:10	Score by quarters: 3–9, 1–8, 2–4, 1–3			Gelora Bung Karno Aquatic Stadium, Jakarta; Referees: Jiathornwattana (THA), Štampalija (CRO)
27 August; 17:10	Harahap 4	Goals	Inaba 7	Gelora Bung Karno Aquatic Stadium, Jakarta; Referees: Jiathornwattana (THA), Štampalija (CRO)

28 August; 14:30	Hong Kong	0–23	Japan	Gelora Bung Karno Aquatic Stadium, Jakarta; Referees: Tan (SGP), Han (KOR)
28 August; 14:30	Score by quarters: 0–7, 0–6, 0–5, 0–5			Gelora Bung Karno Aquatic Stadium, Jakarta; Referees: Tan (SGP), Han (KOR)
28 August; 14:30	0	Goals	Adachi 5	Gelora Bung Karno Aquatic Stadium, Jakarta; Referees: Tan (SGP), Han (KOR)

28 August; 15:50	China	17–5	Saudi Arabia	Gelora Bung Karno Aquatic Stadium, Jakarta; Referees: Safabakhsh (IRI), Salnichenko (KAZ)
28 August; 15:50	Score by quarters: 4–0, 2–1, 6–1, 5–3			Gelora Bung Karno Aquatic Stadium, Jakarta; Referees: Safabakhsh (IRI), Salnichenko (KAZ)
28 August; 15:50	Liu, Sha, Zhang 3	Goals	Al-Dughather, Al-Malki 2	Gelora Bung Karno Aquatic Stadium, Jakarta; Referees: Safabakhsh (IRI), Salnichenko (KAZ)

29 August; 15:50	Japan	20–4	Saudi Arabia	Gelora Bung Karno Aquatic Stadium, Jakarta; Referees: Ni (CHN), Jiathornwattana (THA)
29 August; 15:50	Score by quarters: 4–1, 5–1, 6–0, 5–2			Gelora Bung Karno Aquatic Stadium, Jakarta; Referees: Ni (CHN), Jiathornwattana (THA)
29 August; 15:50	Adachi 5	Goals	Al-Dughather 2	Gelora Bung Karno Aquatic Stadium, Jakarta; Referees: Ni (CHN), Jiathornwattana (THA)

29 August; 17:10	Hong Kong	8–11	Indonesia	Gelora Bung Karno Aquatic Stadium, Jakarta; Referees: Stavridis (GRE), Alexandrescu (ROU)
29 August; 17:10	Score by quarters: 0–3, 3–3, 2–3, 3–2			Gelora Bung Karno Aquatic Stadium, Jakarta; Referees: Stavridis (GRE), Alexandrescu (ROU)
29 August; 17:10	Fung K.Chu., Chan 3	Goals	Harahap 5	Gelora Bung Karno Aquatic Stadium, Jakarta; Referees: Stavridis (GRE), Alexandrescu (ROU)

=== Final round ===
Quarterfinals
30 August
Iran	15
Saudi Arabia	7
30 August
Singapore	6
Japan	28
30 August
South Korea	4
China	12
30 August
Kazakhstan	20
Indonesia	4

Semifinals
31 August
Iran	7
Japan	18
31 August
China	8
Kazakhstan	9

Gold medal match
1 September
Japan	7
Kazakhstan	8
Bronze medal match
1 September
Iran (p)	8 (8)
China	8 (7)

Classification 5–8
31 August
Saudi Arabia	5
Singapore	6
31 August
South Korea	15
Indonesia	7

Classification 5–6
1 September
Singapore	8 (2)
South Korea (p)	8 (4)
Classification 7–8
1 September
Saudi Arabia	12
Indonesia	8

==== Quarterfinals ====
30 August; 9:00	Iran	15–7	Saudi Arabia	Gelora Bung Karno Aquatic Stadium, Jakarta; Referees: Alexandrescu (ROU), Štampalija (CRO)
30 August; 9:00	Score by quarters: 2–1, 4–1, 5–3, 4–2			Gelora Bung Karno Aquatic Stadium, Jakarta; Referees: Alexandrescu (ROU), Štampalija (CRO)
30 August; 9:00	Malek-Khanbanan 4	Goals	Al-Dughather 3	Gelora Bung Karno Aquatic Stadium, Jakarta; Referees: Alexandrescu (ROU), Štampalija (CRO)

30 August; 10:20	South Korea	4–12	China	Gelora Bung Karno Aquatic Stadium, Jakarta; Referees: Flahive (AUS), Safabakhsh (IRI)
30 August; 10:20	Score by quarters: 1–3, 1–2, 1–5, 1–2			Gelora Bung Karno Aquatic Stadium, Jakarta; Referees: Flahive (AUS), Safabakhsh (IRI)
30 August; 10:20	Chu 2	Goals	Chen Z. 4	Gelora Bung Karno Aquatic Stadium, Jakarta; Referees: Flahive (AUS), Safabakhsh (IRI)

30 August; 16:30	Kazakhstan	20–4	Indonesia	Gelora Bung Karno Aquatic Stadium, Jakarta; Referees: Tan (SGP), Tahara (JPN)
30 August; 16:30	Score by quarters: 4–3, 5–0, 6–1, 5–0			Gelora Bung Karno Aquatic Stadium, Jakarta; Referees: Tan (SGP), Tahara (JPN)
30 August; 16:30	Altayev 5	Goals	four players 1	Gelora Bung Karno Aquatic Stadium, Jakarta; Referees: Tan (SGP), Tahara (JPN)

30 August; 17:50	Singapore	6–28	Japan	Gelora Bung Karno Aquatic Stadium, Jakarta; Referees: Stavridis (GRE), Salnichenko (KAZ)
30 August; 17:50	Score by quarters: 2–5, 1–8, 2–10, 1–5			Gelora Bung Karno Aquatic Stadium, Jakarta; Referees: Stavridis (GRE), Salnichenko (KAZ)
30 August; 17:50	Loh, S. Yu 2	Goals	Inaba 5	Gelora Bung Karno Aquatic Stadium, Jakarta; Referees: Stavridis (GRE), Salnichenko (KAZ)

==== Classification 5–8 ====
31 August; 9:00	Saudi Arabia	5–6	Singapore	Gelora Bung Karno Aquatic Stadium, Jakarta; Referees: Ni (CHN), Safabakhsh (IRI)
31 August; 9:00	Score by quarters: 3–1, 0–1, 2–0, 0–4			Gelora Bung Karno Aquatic Stadium, Jakarta; Referees: Ni (CHN), Safabakhsh (IRI)
31 August; 9:00	Taleb, Al-Dughather 2	Goals	Koh 2	Gelora Bung Karno Aquatic Stadium, Jakarta; Referees: Ni (CHN), Safabakhsh (IRI)

31 August; 10:20	South Korea	15–7	Indonesia	Gelora Bung Karno Aquatic Stadium, Jakarta; Referees: Tahara (JPN), Salnichenko (KAZ)
31 August; 10:20	Score by quarters: 4–2, 3–3, 5–1, 3–1			Gelora Bung Karno Aquatic Stadium, Jakarta; Referees: Tahara (JPN), Salnichenko (KAZ)
31 August; 10:20	Park 6	Goals	Firdaus, Harahap 2	Gelora Bung Karno Aquatic Stadium, Jakarta; Referees: Tahara (JPN), Salnichenko (KAZ)

==== Semifinals ====
31 August; 16:00	Iran	7–18	Japan	Gelora Bung Karno Aquatic Stadium, Jakarta; Referees: Tan (SGP), Flahive (AUS)
31 August; 16:00	Score by quarters: 0–5, 1–1, 4–6, 2–6			Gelora Bung Karno Aquatic Stadium, Jakarta; Referees: Tan (SGP), Flahive (AUS)
31 August; 16:00	Malek-Khanbanan, Yazdankhah 2	Goals	Inaba 6	Gelora Bung Karno Aquatic Stadium, Jakarta; Referees: Tan (SGP), Flahive (AUS)

31 August; 17:20	China	8–9	Kazakhstan	Gelora Bung Karno Aquatic Stadium, Jakarta; Referees: Štampalija (CRO), Alexandrescu (ROU)
31 August; 17:20	Score by quarters: 1–3, 3–1, 2–4, 2–1			Gelora Bung Karno Aquatic Stadium, Jakarta; Referees: Štampalija (CRO), Alexandrescu (ROU)
31 August; 17:20	Chen Z. 3	Goals	Shmider 3	Gelora Bung Karno Aquatic Stadium, Jakarta; Referees: Štampalija (CRO), Alexandrescu (ROU)

==== Classification 7–8 ====
1 September; 9:00	Saudi Arabia	12–8	Indonesia	Gelora Bung Karno Aquatic Stadium, Jakarta; Referees: Han (KOR), Tahara (JPN)
1 September; 9:00	Score by quarters: 3–0, 2–3, 0–2, 7–3			Gelora Bung Karno Aquatic Stadium, Jakarta; Referees: Han (KOR), Tahara (JPN)
1 September; 9:00	Al-Malki 4	Goals	Budiman, Arifin 2	Gelora Bung Karno Aquatic Stadium, Jakarta; Referees: Han (KOR), Tahara (JPN)

==== Classification 5–6 ====
1 September; 10:20	Singapore	10–12 (PSO)	South Korea	Gelora Bung Karno Aquatic Stadium, Jakarta; Referees: Safabakhsh (IRI), Ni (CHN)
1 September; 10:20	Score by quarters: 4–3, 1–3, 1–1, 2–1 PSO: 2–4			Gelora Bung Karno Aquatic Stadium, Jakarta; Referees: Safabakhsh (IRI), Ni (CHN)
1 September; 10:20	Koh 4	Goals	Park 5	Gelora Bung Karno Aquatic Stadium, Jakarta; Referees: Safabakhsh (IRI), Ni (CHN)

==== Bronze medal match ====
1 September; 16:00	Iran	16–15 (PSO)	China	Gelora Bung Karno Aquatic Stadium, Jakarta; Referees: Stavridis (GRE), Alexandrescu (ROU)
1 September; 16:00	Score by quarters: 1–3, 4–2, 2–1, 1–2 PSO: 8–7			Gelora Bung Karno Aquatic Stadium, Jakarta; Referees: Stavridis (GRE), Alexandrescu (ROU)
1 September; 16:00	Malek-Khanbanan 4	Goals	Chen Z. 6	Gelora Bung Karno Aquatic Stadium, Jakarta; Referees: Stavridis (GRE), Alexandrescu (ROU)

==== Gold medal match ====
1 September; 17:20	Japan	7–8	Kazakhstan	Gelora Bung Karno Aquatic Stadium, Jakarta; Referees: Štampalija (CRO), Flahive (AUS)
1 September; 17:20	Score by quarters: 3–2, 2–0, 2–3, 0–3			Gelora Bung Karno Aquatic Stadium, Jakarta; Referees: Štampalija (CRO), Flahive (AUS)
1 September; 17:20	Adachi 3	Goals	Ruday 3	Gelora Bung Karno Aquatic Stadium, Jakarta; Referees: Štampalija (CRO), Flahive (AUS)

== Final standing ==
Rank	Team	Pld	W	D	L
1st place, gold medalist(s)	Kazakhstan	6	6	0	0
2nd place, silver medalist(s)	Japan	7	6	0	1
3rd place, bronze medalist(s)	Iran	6	4	0	2
4	China	7	4	0	3
5	South Korea	6	3	0	3
6	Singapore	6	1	0	5
7	Saudi Arabia	7	2	1	4
8	Indonesia	7	1	1	5
9	Hong Kong	4	0	0	4
