= Water polo at the 2022 Asian Games – Men's tournament =

Men at the 2022 Asian Games
- Venue: Huanglong Swimming Center
- Date: 2–7 October 2023
- Competitors: 104 from 8 nations

Medalists
gold medal	Japan
silver medal	China
bronze medal	Kazakhstan

The men's tournament of Water polo at the 2022 Asian Games at Hangzhou, China, was held from 2–7 October 2023 at the Huanglong Swimming Center. The Asian Games acted as the Asian qualifying tournament for the 2024 Summer Olympics in Paris.

== Squads ==
China	Hong Kong	Iran	Japan
Wu Honghui; Hu Zhangxin; Chu Chenghao; Peng Jiahao; Zhang Jinpeng; Xie Zekai; Chen Zhongxian; Chen Rui; Chen Yimin; Liu Yu; Zhang Chufeng; Tan Feihu; Liang Zhiwei	Yim Wai Ho; Wong Ting Hang; Fung Kong Chun; Fung Kong Ching; Ip Chun Hong; Lau Hok Yue; Ko Ho Wai; Cheng Hei Man; Ku Yat Wa; Gilman Choi; Cheng Siu Yuen; Cheng Hei Chun; Kong Cheuk Kiu	Hamed Karimi; Mehdi Daeitaghi; Amir Hossein Rahbar; Mehdi Barzegari; Amir Reza Jalilpour; Khashayar Ziaeddini; Peyman Asadi; Mehdi Yazdankhah; Soheil Rostamian; Amin Ghavidel; Arshia Almasi; Alireza Mehri; Amir Ata Khazaei	Katsuyuki Tanamura; Seiya Adachi; Taiyo Watanabe; Daichi Ogihara; Ikkei Nitta; Toi Suzuki; Kiyomu Date; Mitsuru Takata; Atsushi Arai; Yusuke Inaba; Keigo Okawa; Kenta Araki; Towa Nishimura
Kazakhstan	Singapore	South Korea	Thailand
Temirlan Balfanbayev; Eduard Tsoy; Yegor Beloussov; Dušan Marković; Danil Artyukh; Alexey Shmider; Murat Shakenov; Srđan Vuksanović; Rustam Ukumanov; Mikhail Ruday; Ruslan Akhmetov; Sultan Shonzhigitov; Daniil Matolinets	Darren Lee; Loh Zhi Zhi; Chow Jing Lun; Derek Chan; Cayden Loh; Paul Louis Tan; Dominic Chan; Ang An Jun; Yu Junjie; Lee Cheng Kang; Yip Yang; Koh Jian Ying; Lee Kai Yang	Jung Byeong-young; Kim Ho-jun; Lee Chang-hun; Kwon Tae-woo; Gwon Dae-yong; Jeon Gi-jae; Kim Sung-hoon; Lee Yong-seok; Han Hyo-min; Yong Woo-seok; Kim Chan-soo; Kang Min-soo; Lee Si-deok	Chanoknan Kaewmanee; Suteenan Kaewmanee; Kananon Kuntawong; Phatsakorn Maneejohn; Kittikorn Kongboonkerd; Kreerati Pimpapak; Pokpong Morksang; Pannatorn Khaekram; Apiruk Chaimongkol; Pattanit Chompoosang; Peerawat Chairit; Chanon Khramyoo; Sutthiyarn Pongprayoon

== Results ==
All times are China Standard Time (UTC+08:00)

=== Preliminary round ===
==== Group A ====
Pos	Team	Pld	W	PW	PL	L	GF	GA	GD	Pts	Qualification
1	China	3	3	0	0	0	57	23	+34	9	Quarterfinals
2	Iran	3	2	0	0	1	48	26	+22	6	Quarterfinals
3	South Korea	3	1	0	0	2	35	37	−2	3	Quarterfinals
4	Thailand	3	0	0	0	3	22	76	−54	0	Quarterfinals

Source: OCA

2 October; 19:00	Thailand	8–27	China	Huanglong Swimming Center, Hangzhou; Referees: Raković (SRB), Simonyan (HKG)
2 October; 19:00	Score by quarters: 1–6, 4–9, 1–7, 2–5			Huanglong Swimming Center, Hangzhou; Referees: Raković (SRB), Simonyan (HKG)
2 October; 19:00	S. Kaewmanee, Pimpapak, Chompoosang 2	Goals	Hu, Zhang C. 5	Huanglong Swimming Center, Hangzhou; Referees: Raković (SRB), Simonyan (HKG)

2 October; 20:30	South Korea	4–15	Iran	Huanglong Swimming Center, Hangzhou; Referees: Moribayashi (JPN), Cheng (SGP)
2 October; 20:30	Score by quarters: 2–4, 1–4, 1–4, 0–3			Huanglong Swimming Center, Hangzhou; Referees: Moribayashi (JPN), Cheng (SGP)
2 October; 20:30	Lee C. 2	Goals	Yazdankhah 6	Huanglong Swimming Center, Hangzhou; Referees: Moribayashi (JPN), Cheng (SGP)

3 October; 15:00	Thailand	7–26	Iran	Huanglong Swimming Center, Hangzhou; Referees: Gómez (ESP), Salnichenko (KAZ)
3 October; 15:00	Score by quarters: 2–8, 1–5, 1–6, 3–7			Huanglong Swimming Center, Hangzhou; Referees: Gómez (ESP), Salnichenko (KAZ)
3 October; 15:00	Pimpapak 3	Goals	six players 3	Huanglong Swimming Center, Hangzhou; Referees: Gómez (ESP), Salnichenko (KAZ)

3 October; 19:00	South Korea	8–15	China	Huanglong Swimming Center, Hangzhou; Referees: Moribayashi (JPN), Simonyan (HKG)
3 October; 19:00	Score by quarters: 0–2, 1–4, 3–4, 4–5			Huanglong Swimming Center, Hangzhou; Referees: Moribayashi (JPN), Simonyan (HKG)
3 October; 19:00	Kwon, Jeon 2	Goals	Zhang C. 5	Huanglong Swimming Center, Hangzhou; Referees: Moribayashi (JPN), Simonyan (HKG)

4 October; 16:30	Thailand	7–23	South Korea	Huanglong Swimming Center, Hangzhou; Referees: Moller (ARG), Cheng (SGP)
4 October; 16:30	Score by quarters: 2–5, 1–7, 3–3, 1–8			Huanglong Swimming Center, Hangzhou; Referees: Moller (ARG), Cheng (SGP)
4 October; 16:30	S. Kaewmanee, Pimpapak 2	Goals	Gwon, Kang 4	Huanglong Swimming Center, Hangzhou; Referees: Moller (ARG), Cheng (SGP)

4 October; 19:00	China	15–7	Iran	Huanglong Swimming Center, Hangzhou; Referees: Stavridis (GRE), Raković (SRB)
4 October; 19:00	Score by quarters: 3–4, 6–2, 2–1, 4–0			Huanglong Swimming Center, Hangzhou; Referees: Stavridis (GRE), Raković (SRB)
4 October; 19:00	Chen Z. 6	Goals	Almasi 3	Huanglong Swimming Center, Hangzhou; Referees: Stavridis (GRE), Raković (SRB)

==== Group B ====
Pos	Team	Pld	W	PW	PL	L	GF	GA	GD	Pts	Qualification
1	Japan	3	3	0	0	0	70	24	+46	9	Quarterfinals
2	Kazakhstan	3	2	0	0	1	60	23	+37	6	Quarterfinals
3	Singapore	3	1	0	0	2	20	58	−38	3	Quarterfinals
4	Hong Kong	3	0	0	0	3	18	63	−45	0	Quarterfinals

Source: OCA

2 October; 15:00	Kazakhstan	25–4	Hong Kong	Huanglong Swimming Center, Hangzhou; Referees: Assarzadegan (IRI), Sonthipakdee (THA)
2 October; 15:00	Score by quarters: 6–2, 7–0, 9–1, 3–1			Huanglong Swimming Center, Hangzhou; Referees: Assarzadegan (IRI), Sonthipakdee (THA)
2 October; 15:00	Ruday 6	Goals	four players 1	Huanglong Swimming Center, Hangzhou; Referees: Assarzadegan (IRI), Sonthipakdee (THA)

2 October; 16:30	Singapore	5–28	Japan	Huanglong Swimming Center, Hangzhou; Referees: Zhang (CHN), Han (KOR)
2 October; 16:30	Score by quarters: 1–6, 0–7, 3–8, 1–7			Huanglong Swimming Center, Hangzhou; Referees: Zhang (CHN), Han (KOR)
2 October; 16:30	Do. Chan 2	Goals	Adachi, Suzuki, Inaba 4	Huanglong Swimming Center, Hangzhou; Referees: Zhang (CHN), Han (KOR)

3 October; 16:30	Kazakhstan	13–15	Japan	Huanglong Swimming Center, Hangzhou; Referees: Stavridis (GRE), Moller (ARG)
3 October; 16:30	Score by quarters: 3–4, 2–4, 4–4, 4–3			Huanglong Swimming Center, Hangzhou; Referees: Stavridis (GRE), Moller (ARG)
3 October; 16:30	Ruday 4	Goals	Inaba 6	Huanglong Swimming Center, Hangzhou; Referees: Stavridis (GRE), Moller (ARG)

3 October; 20:30	Singapore	11–8	Hong Kong	Huanglong Swimming Center, Hangzhou; Referees: Raković (SRB), Assarzadegan (IRI)
3 October; 20:30	Score by quarters: 1–4, 3–2, 5–2, 2–0			Huanglong Swimming Center, Hangzhou; Referees: Raković (SRB), Assarzadegan (IRI)
3 October; 20:30	Koh 3	Goals	Cheng H.M. 3	Huanglong Swimming Center, Hangzhou; Referees: Raković (SRB), Assarzadegan (IRI)

4 October; 15:00	Kazakhstan	22–4	Singapore	Huanglong Swimming Center, Hangzhou; Referees: Gómez (ESP), Zhang (CHN)
4 October; 15:00	Score by quarters: 5–1, 6–1, 6–0, 5–2			Huanglong Swimming Center, Hangzhou; Referees: Gómez (ESP), Zhang (CHN)
4 October; 15:00	Artyukh, Vuksanović, Ruday 4	Goals	four players 1	Huanglong Swimming Center, Hangzhou; Referees: Gómez (ESP), Zhang (CHN)

4 October; 20:30	Hong Kong	6–27	Japan	Huanglong Swimming Center, Hangzhou; Referees: Han (KOR), Sonthipakdee (THA)
4 October; 20:30	Score by quarters: 2–6, 1–8, 2–7, 1–6			Huanglong Swimming Center, Hangzhou; Referees: Han (KOR), Sonthipakdee (THA)
4 October; 20:30	Fung K.Chi., Cheng H.M. 2	Goals	Watanabe 7	Huanglong Swimming Center, Hangzhou; Referees: Han (KOR), Sonthipakdee (THA)

=== Final round ===
Quarterfinals
5 October
Iran	13
Singapore	6
5 October
Thailand	2
Japan	23
5 October
South Korea	8
Kazakhstan	15
5 October
China	23
Hong Kong	3

Semifinals
6 October
Iran	11
Japan	18
6 October
Kazakhstan	10 (3)
China (p)	10 (4)

Gold medal match
7 October
Japan	11
China	7
Bronze medal match
7 October
Iran	7 (2)
Kazakhstan (p)	7 (3)

Classification 5th–8th
6 October
Singapore	9
Thailand	6
6 October
South Korea	15
Hong Kong	11

Classification 5th–6th
7 October
Singapore	10
South Korea	8
Classification 7th–8th
7 October
Thailand	11 (8)
Hong Kong (p)	11 (9)

==== Quarterfinals ====
5 October; 15:00	Iran	13–6	Singapore	Huanglong Swimming Center, Hangzhou; Referees: Raković (SRB), Moribayashi (JPN)
5 October; 15:00	Score by quarters: 2–2, 4–1, 2–2, 5–1			Huanglong Swimming Center, Hangzhou; Referees: Raković (SRB), Moribayashi (JPN)
5 October; 15:00	Yazdankhah 5	Goals	Koh 2	Huanglong Swimming Center, Hangzhou; Referees: Raković (SRB), Moribayashi (JPN)

5 October; 16:30	South Korea	8–15	Kazakhstan	Huanglong Swimming Center, Hangzhou; Referees: Gómez (ESP), Zhang (CHN)
5 October; 16:30	Score by quarters: 1–3, 2–2, 3–4, 2–6			Huanglong Swimming Center, Hangzhou; Referees: Gómez (ESP), Zhang (CHN)
5 October; 16:30	Han 3	Goals	Ruday 4	Huanglong Swimming Center, Hangzhou; Referees: Gómez (ESP), Zhang (CHN)

5 October; 19:00	China	23–3	Hong Kong	Huanglong Swimming Center, Hangzhou; Referees: Moller (ARG), Salnichenko (KAZ)
5 October; 19:00	Score by quarters: 6–0, 5–1, 5–2, 7–0			Huanglong Swimming Center, Hangzhou; Referees: Moller (ARG), Salnichenko (KAZ)
5 October; 19:00	Peng, Chen R. 4	Goals	Lau, Cheng H.M., Choi 1	Huanglong Swimming Center, Hangzhou; Referees: Moller (ARG), Salnichenko (KAZ)

5 October; 20:30	Thailand	2–23	Japan	Huanglong Swimming Center, Hangzhou; Referees: Cheng (SGP), Simonyan (HKG)
5 October; 20:30	Score by quarters: 0–6, 1–7, 1–6, 0–4			Huanglong Swimming Center, Hangzhou; Referees: Cheng (SGP), Simonyan (HKG)
5 October; 20:30	Pimpapak, Chompoosang 1	Goals	Takata 5	Huanglong Swimming Center, Hangzhou; Referees: Cheng (SGP), Simonyan (HKG)

==== Classification 5th–8th ====
6 October; 15:00	Singapore	9–6	Thailand	Huanglong Swimming Center, Hangzhou; Referees: Salnichenko (KAZ), Moribayashi (JPN)
6 October; 15:00	Score by quarters: 3–1, 3–1, 2–3, 1–1			Huanglong Swimming Center, Hangzhou; Referees: Salnichenko (KAZ), Moribayashi (JPN)
6 October; 15:00	Loh Z., C. Loh, Do. Chan 2	Goals	Pimpapak 2	Huanglong Swimming Center, Hangzhou; Referees: Salnichenko (KAZ), Moribayashi (JPN)

6 October; 16:30	South Korea	15–11	Hong Kong	Huanglong Swimming Center, Hangzhou; Referees: Zhang (CHN), Assarzadegan (IRI)
6 October; 16:30	Score by quarters: 4–3, 3–4, 6–0, 2–4			Huanglong Swimming Center, Hangzhou; Referees: Zhang (CHN), Assarzadegan (IRI)
6 October; 16:30	Gwon, Han, Kang 3	Goals	four players 2	Huanglong Swimming Center, Hangzhou; Referees: Zhang (CHN), Assarzadegan (IRI)

==== Semifinals ====
6 October; 19:00	Iran	11–18	Japan	Huanglong Swimming Center, Hangzhou; Referees: Raković (SRB), Gómez (ESP)
6 October; 19:00	Score by quarters: 2–4, 2–5, 4–5, 3–4			Huanglong Swimming Center, Hangzhou; Referees: Raković (SRB), Gómez (ESP)
6 October; 19:00	Rostamian 4	Goals	Adachi, Inaba 3	Huanglong Swimming Center, Hangzhou; Referees: Raković (SRB), Gómez (ESP)

6 October; 20:30	Kazakhstan	13–14 (PSO)	China	Huanglong Swimming Center, Hangzhou; Referees: Stavridis (GRE), Moller (ARG)
6 October; 20:30	Score by quarters: 3–2, 1–4, 3–2, 3–2 PSO: 3–4			Huanglong Swimming Center, Hangzhou; Referees: Stavridis (GRE), Moller (ARG)
6 October; 20:30	Tsoy, Akhmetov 3	Goals	Zhang C. 6	Huanglong Swimming Center, Hangzhou; Referees: Stavridis (GRE), Moller (ARG)

==== Classification 7th–8th ====
7 October; 15:00	Thailand	19–20 (PSO)	Hong Kong	Huanglong Swimming Center, Hangzhou; Referees: Moribayashi (JPN), Cheng (SGP)
7 October; 15:00	Score by quarters: 1–3, 4–3, 3–1, 3–4 PSO: 8–9			Huanglong Swimming Center, Hangzhou; Referees: Moribayashi (JPN), Cheng (SGP)
7 October; 15:00	Maneejohn, Pimpapak 5	Goals	Cheng H.M., Choi 6	Huanglong Swimming Center, Hangzhou; Referees: Moribayashi (JPN), Cheng (SGP)

==== Classification 5th–6th ====
7 October; 16:30	Singapore	10–8	South Korea	Huanglong Swimming Center, Hangzhou; Referees: Salnichenko (KAZ), Zhang (CHN)
7 October; 16:30	Score by quarters: 3–3, 3–3, 1–1, 3–1			Huanglong Swimming Center, Hangzhou; Referees: Salnichenko (KAZ), Zhang (CHN)
7 October; 16:30	Yu, Koh 2	Goals	Gwon 3	Huanglong Swimming Center, Hangzhou; Referees: Salnichenko (KAZ), Zhang (CHN)

==== Bronze medal match ====
7 October; 19:00	Iran	9–10 (PSO)	Kazakhstan	Huanglong Swimming Center, Hangzhou; Referees: Raković (SRB), Moller (ARG)
7 October; 19:00	Score by quarters: 3–2, 1–2, 2–0, 1–3 PSO: 2–3			Huanglong Swimming Center, Hangzhou; Referees: Raković (SRB), Moller (ARG)
7 October; 19:00	Yazdankhah 3	Goals	Marković, Ruday 3	Huanglong Swimming Center, Hangzhou; Referees: Raković (SRB), Moller (ARG)

==== Gold medal match ====
7 October; 20:30	Japan	11–7	China	Huanglong Swimming Center, Hangzhou; Referees: Stavridis (GRE), Gómez (ESP)
7 October; 20:30	Score by quarters: 1–0, 4–1, 4–4, 2–2			Huanglong Swimming Center, Hangzhou; Referees: Stavridis (GRE), Gómez (ESP)
7 October; 20:30	Inaba 3	Goals	Chen Z. 3	Huanglong Swimming Center, Hangzhou; Referees: Stavridis (GRE), Gómez (ESP)

== Final standing ==
Rank	Team	Pld	W	PW	PL	L
1st place, gold medalist(s)	Japan	6	6	0	0	0
2nd place, silver medalist(s)	China	6	4	1	0	1
3rd place, bronze medalist(s)	Kazakhstan	6	3	1	1	1
4	Iran	6	3	0	1	2
5	Singapore	6	3	0	0	3
6	South Korea	6	2	0	0	4
7	Hong Kong	6	0	1	0	5
8	Thailand	6	0	0	1	5
