= Dušan Marković (water polo) =

Kazakhstani water polo player

Personal information
- Other names: Dushan Markovich
- Nationality: Serbian, Kazakhstani
- Born: 3 May 1990 (age 36) Belgrade, Serbia
Medal record
Men's water polo
Representing Serbia
Universiade
Bronze medal – third place	2013 Kazan	Team
Representing Kazakhstan
Asian Games
Silver medal – second place	2026 Aichi–Nagoya	Team
Bronze medal – third place	2022 Hangzhou	Team

Dušan Marković (Душан Марковић, Dushan Markovich, born 3 May 1990) is a Serbian-Kazakhstani water polo player. He competed in the men's tournament at the 2020 Summer Olympics.
