= Syria men's national water polo team =

Syria
- FINA code: SYR
- Nickname(s): Nosour Qasioun (Arabic: نسور قاسيون, lit. 'Qasioun Eagles')
- Association: Syrian Arab Swimming and Aquatic Sports Federation
- Confederation: AASF (Asia)

FINA ranking (since 2008)
- Current: Unknown (as of 9 August 2021)

Asian Water Polo Championship
- Appearances: none

Asian Cup
- Appearances: none

Mediterranean Games
- Appearances: 1 (first in 1987)
- Best result: 5th place (1987)

Asian Beach Games
- Appearances: 1 (first in 2010)
- Best result: 4th place (2010)

The Syria men's national water polo team represents Syria in international water polo competitions and friendly matches.

== Honours ==
=== Asian Beach Games ===
- 2010: 4th

=== Mediterranean Games ===
- 1987: 5th
