= Miras Aubakirov =

Kazakhstani water polo player

Personal information
- Native name: Мирас Еркенович Аубакиров
- Full name: Miras Yerkenovich Aubakirov
- Born: 20 October 1996 (age 29) Zaysan, Kazakhstan

Sport
- Country: Kazakhstan
- Sport: Water polo
Medal record
Representing Kazakhstan
Asian Games
Gold medal – first place	2018 Jakarta	Team competition
Asian Beach Games
Gold medal – first place	2014 Phuket	Team competition
Gold medal – first place	2016 Da Nang	Team competition

Miras Aubakirov (Мирас Ермекұлы Әубәкіров, born 20 October 1996) is a Kazakhstani water polo player. He competed in the men's tournament at the 2020 Summer Olympics.
