= Beach water polo at the 2016 Asian Beach Games =

- Venue: Biển Đông Park
- Dates: 27 September – 1 October 2016

Beach water polo competition at the 2016 Asian Beach Games was held in Da Nang, Vietnam from 27 September to 1 October 2016 at the Bien Dong Park, Danang, Vietnam. Kazakhstan won the tournament in a round robin competition, Indonesia, which tied with China in both competition points and their head-to-head match, was awarded the silver medal based on having better head-to-head result against the highest ranked team Kazakhstan.

== Medalists ==
Event	Gold	Silver	Bronze
Men	Kazakhstan; Valeriy Shlemov; Yevgeniy Medvedev; Maxim Zhardan; Roman Pilipenko; Miras Aubakirov; Altay Altayev; Rustam Ukumanov	Indonesia; Novian Dwi Putra; Bradley Ignatius Legawa; Muhammad Rizki; Delvin Felliciano; Maulana Bayu Herfianto; Ridjkie Mulia Harahap; Reza Aditya Putra	China; Li Songyu; Mo Mingdong; Lei Zhenrui; Wang Yunji; Yao Tongqiang; Zhang Juxuan; Ni Dong

== Results ==
Pos	Team	Pld	W	D	L	GF	GA	GD	Pts
1	Kazakhstan	5	5	0	0	77	14	+63	10
2	Indonesia	5	3	1	1	53	37	+16	7
3	China	5	3	1	1	60	38	+22	7
4	Hong Kong	5	2	0	3	44	62	−18	4
5	Thailand	5	1	0	4	28	41	−13	2
6	Afghanistan	5	0	0	5	20	90	−70	0

Source: OCA

27 September; 9:00	Hong Kong	6–15	Indonesia	Biển Đông Park, Da Nang; Referees: Damir Temyrkhanov (KAZ)
27 September; 9:00	Scoring by half: 1–4, 5–11			Biển Đông Park, Da Nang; Referees: Damir Temyrkhanov (KAZ)
27 September; 9:00	Cheung H., Fung 2	Goals	Harahap 6	Biển Đông Park, Da Nang; Referees: Damir Temyrkhanov (KAZ)

27 September; 10:00	China	19–7	Afghanistan	Biển Đông Park, Da Nang; Referees: Nicholas Tan (SGP)
27 September; 10:00	Scoring by half: 12–5, 7–2			Biển Đông Park, Da Nang; Referees: Nicholas Tan (SGP)
27 September; 10:00	Yao 5	Goals	Rezaie 3	Biển Đông Park, Da Nang; Referees: Nicholas Tan (SGP)

27 September; 11:00	Thailand	2–16	Kazakhstan	Biển Đông Park, Da Nang; Referees: Yang Pang (CHN)
27 September; 11:00	Scoring by half: 1–8, 1–8			Biển Đông Park, Da Nang; Referees: Yang Pang (CHN)
27 September; 11:00	Suwanchart, Chaisombat 1	Goals	Zhardan, Pilipenko, Ukumanov 4	Biển Đông Park, Da Nang; Referees: Yang Pang (CHN)

28 September; 9:00	Indonesia	18–3	Afghanistan	Biển Đông Park, Da Nang; Referees: Wallop Jirathornwattana (THA)
28 September; 9:00	Scoring by half: 12–1, 6–2			Biển Đông Park, Da Nang; Referees: Wallop Jirathornwattana (THA)
28 September; 9:00	Herfianto 6	Goals	Rezaie 2	Biển Đông Park, Da Nang; Referees: Wallop Jirathornwattana (THA)

28 September; 10:00	China	2–13	Kazakhstan	Biển Đông Park, Da Nang; Referees: Nicholas Tan (SGP)
28 September; 10:00	Scoring by half: 1–6, 1–7			Biển Đông Park, Da Nang; Referees: Nicholas Tan (SGP)
28 September; 10:00	Lei, Yao 1	Goals	Ukumanov 5	Biển Đông Park, Da Nang; Referees: Nicholas Tan (SGP)

28 September; 11:00	Hong Kong	6–5	Thailand	Biển Đông Park, Da Nang; Referees: Yang Pang (CHN)
28 September; 11:00	Scoring by half: 4–3, 2–2			Biển Đông Park, Da Nang; Referees: Yang Pang (CHN)
28 September; 11:00	Po 2	Goals	Chaisombat, Wongpairoj 2	Biển Đông Park, Da Nang; Referees: Yang Pang (CHN)

29 September; 9:00	Kazakhstan	14–2	Afghanistan	Biển Đông Park, Da Nang; Referees: Jovinus Carolus Legawa (INA)
29 September; 9:00	Scoring by half: 7–1, 7–1			Biển Đông Park, Da Nang; Referees: Jovinus Carolus Legawa (INA)
29 September; 9:00	Altayev 6	Goals	Rezaie, Rajabi 1	Biển Đông Park, Da Nang; Referees: Jovinus Carolus Legawa (INA)

29 September; 10:00	Thailand	3–5	Indonesia	Biển Đông Park, Da Nang; Referees: Yang Pang (CHN)
29 September; 10:00	Scoring by half: 3–3, 0–2			Biển Đông Park, Da Nang; Referees: Yang Pang (CHN)
29 September; 10:00	Chaisombat 2	Goals	Legawa, Harahap 2	Biển Đông Park, Da Nang; Referees: Yang Pang (CHN)

29 September; 11:00	Hong Kong	3–18	China	Biển Đông Park, Da Nang; Referees: Damir Temyrkhanov (KAZ)
29 September; 11:00	Scoring by half: 1–9, 2–9			Biển Đông Park, Da Nang; Referees: Damir Temyrkhanov (KAZ)
29 September; 11:00	Po 2	Goals	Zhang, Ni 4	Biển Đông Park, Da Nang; Referees: Damir Temyrkhanov (KAZ)

30 September; 9:00	Kazakhstan	15–5	Indonesia	Biển Đông Park, Da Nang; Referees: Nicholas Tan (SGP)
30 September; 9:00	Scoring by half: 10–1, 5–4			Biển Đông Park, Da Nang; Referees: Nicholas Tan (SGP)
30 September; 9:00	Medvedev, Altayev 4	Goals	Legawa, Rizki 2	Biển Đông Park, Da Nang; Referees: Nicholas Tan (SGP)

30 September; 10:00	Hong Kong	26–5	Afghanistan	Biển Đông Park, Da Nang; Referees: Damir Temyrkhanov (KAZ)
30 September; 10:00	Scoring by half: 15–1, 11–4			Biển Đông Park, Da Nang; Referees: Damir Temyrkhanov (KAZ)
30 September; 10:00	Fung 6	Goals	Rajabi 3	Biển Đông Park, Da Nang; Referees: Damir Temyrkhanov (KAZ)

30 September; 11:00	Thailand	5–11	China	Biển Đông Park, Da Nang; Referees: Jovinus Carolus Legawa (INA)
30 September; 11:00	Scoring by half: 3–5, 2–6			Biển Đông Park, Da Nang; Referees: Jovinus Carolus Legawa (INA)
30 September; 11:00	Wongpairoj 2	Goals	Lei 5	Biển Đông Park, Da Nang; Referees: Jovinus Carolus Legawa (INA)

1 October; 9:00	China	10–10	Indonesia	Biển Đông Park, Da Nang; Referees: Damir Temyrkhanov (KAZ)
1 October; 9:00	Scoring by half: 6–7, 4–3			Biển Đông Park, Da Nang; Referees: Damir Temyrkhanov (KAZ)
1 October; 9:00	four players 2	Goals	Legawa, Harahap 3	Biển Đông Park, Da Nang; Referees: Damir Temyrkhanov (KAZ)

1 October; 10:00	Thailand	13–3	Afghanistan	Biển Đông Park, Da Nang; Referees: Jovinus Carolus Legawa (INA)
1 October; 10:00	Scoring by half: 9–1, 4–2			Biển Đông Park, Da Nang; Referees: Jovinus Carolus Legawa (INA)
1 October; 10:00	Siwalai 4	Goals	Rezaie 2	Biển Đông Park, Da Nang; Referees: Jovinus Carolus Legawa (INA)

1 October; 11:00	Hong Kong	3–19	Kazakhstan	Biển Đông Park, Da Nang; Referees: Wallop Jirathornwattana (THA)
1 October; 11:00	Scoring by half: 3–10, 0–9			Biển Đông Park, Da Nang; Referees: Wallop Jirathornwattana (THA)
1 October; 11:00	Cheng, Fung, Cheung T. 1	Goals	Ukumanov 8	Biển Đông Park, Da Nang; Referees: Wallop Jirathornwattana (THA)
