= Yevgeniy Medvedev =

Kazakhstani water polo player

Personal information
- Native name: Евгений Алексеевич Медведев
- Full name: Yevgeny Alekseyevich Medvedev
- Born: 9 August 1985 (age 40) Kazakh SSR, Soviet Union
- Height: 186 cm (6 ft 1 in)
- Weight: 85 kg (187 lb)

Sport
- Country: Kazakhstan
- Sport: Water polo
Medal record
Representing Kazakhstan
Asian Games
| Gold medal – first place | 2018 Jakarta | Team competition |
| Bronze medal – third place | 2006 Doha | Team competition |
Asian Beach Games
| Gold medal – first place | 2008 Bali | Team competition |
| Gold medal – first place | 2014 Phuket | Team competition |
| Gold medal – first place | 2016 Da Nang | Team competition |
Asian Aquatics Championships
| Silver medal – second place | 2012 Dubai | Team competition |
| Silver medal – second place | 2016 Tokyo | Team competition |
Islamic Solidarity Games
| Silver medal – second place | 2005 Mecca | Team competition |

Yevgeniy Medvedev (Russian: Евгений Алексеевич Медведев; born 9 August 1985) is a water polo player of Kazakhstan. He was part of the Kazakhstani team at the 2015 World Aquatics Championships.

Medvedev represented Kazakhstan at the 2020 Summer Olympics.

== See also ==
- Kazakhstan at the 2015 World Aquatics Championships
