= 3x3 basketball at the 2014 Asian Beach Games =

- Venue: Karon Beach
- Dates: 15–18 November 2014

3x3 basketball competition (as Beach basketball) at the 2014 Asian Beach Games was held in Phuket, Thailand from 15 to 18 November 2014 at Karon Beach, Phuket Island, Thailand.

== Medalists ==
Event	Gold	Silver	Bronze
Men	Qatar; Boney Watson; Baker Ahmad; Yasseen Ismail; Mohammed Saleem	India; Pratham Singh; Vishesh Bhriguvanshi; Amritpal Singh; Yadwinder Singh	Thailand; Wutipong Dasom; Bandit Lakhan; Sukhdave Ghogar; Attaporn Lertmalaiporn
Women	Chinese Taipei; Huang Jou-chen; Lo Pin; Su Yi-ching; Chen Ting-an	China; Fang Lingling; Huang Yinting; Wu Xiaoyan; An Jing	Thailand; Juthamas Jantakan; Supranee Rudrodkij; Juthathip Mathuros; Chalisa Chamnarnwaree

== Medal table ==
Rank	Nation	Gold	Silver	Bronze	Total
1	Chinese Taipei (TPE)	1	0	0	1
1	Qatar (QAT)	1	0	0	1
3	China (CHN)	0	1	0	1
3	India (IND)	0	1	0	1
5	Thailand (THA)	0	0	2	2
Totals (5 entries)		2	2	2	6

== Results ==
=== Men ===
==== Preliminary ====
===== Group A =====
Pos	Team	Pld	W	L	PF	PA	PD	Pts
1	Qatar	5	5	0	101	49	+52	10
2	Bangladesh	5	4	1	69	62	+7	9
3	Oman	5	3	2	75	71	+4	8
4	Turkmenistan	5	2	3	61	61	0	7
5	Afghanistan	5	1	4	44	64	−20	6
6	Maldives	5	0	5	45	88	−43	5

Source: FIBA

15 November
10:00

Bangladesh	9–21	Qatar
Pts: Biswas 6		Pts: Ismail 10

Karon Beach, Phuket
Referees: Leong (SIN), Wichaiphin (THA)

15 November
10:00

Afghanistan	6–5	Maldives
Pts: Soratgar 3		Pts: Zilaal 4

Karon Beach, Phuket
Referees: Yuen (HKG), Al-Zaabi (UAE)

15 November
10:20

Oman	14–13 (OT)	Turkmenistan
Pts: Al-Souli 10		Pts: Baýryýew 10

Karon Beach, Phuket
Referees: Jontapa (THA), Hashim (IND)

15 November
11:00

Maldives	10–20	Bangladesh
Pts: Firash 6		Pts: Biswas 16

Karon Beach, Phuket
Referees: Yang (CHN), Al-Yousef (JOR)

15 November
11:40

Turkmenistan	10–7	Afghanistan
Pts: Baýryýew 6		Pts: Amiri, Soratgar 3

Karon Beach, Phuket
Referees: Mapa (SRI), Yang (CHN)

16 November
10:20

Qatar	20–11	Oman
Pts: Ismail 10		Pts: Al-Haloali 5

Karon Beach, Phuket
Referees: Jontapa (THA), Yang (CHN)

16 November
11:00

Afghanistan	8–15	Oman
Pts: Abdulazim, Soratgar 3		Pts: Al-Hadidi 5

Karon Beach, Phuket
Referees: Yang (CHN), Muongmee (THA)

16 November
11:20

Bangladesh	10–7	Turkmenistan
Pts: Shoaib 5		Pts: Mazurow 3

Karon Beach, Phuket
Referees: Hashim (IND), Ng (MAS)

16 November
11:40

Qatar	21–5	Maldives
Pts: Watson 10		Pts: Ifsah 3

Karon Beach, Phuket
Referees: Leong (SIN), Chubuk (KGZ)

16 November
12:00

Bangladesh	13–10	Afghanistan
Pts: Aziz 6		Pts: Soratgar 8

Karon Beach, Phuket
Referees: Wichaiphin (THA), Mapa (SRI)

17 November
10:00

Turkmenistan	20–12	Maldives
Pts: Paşkow, Mazurow 8		Pts: Zilaal 5

Karon Beach, Phuket
Referees: Yang (CHN), Chubuk (KGZ)

17 November
10:00

Afghanistan	13–21	Qatar
Pts: Soratgar 10		Pts: Watson, Ismail, Saleem 6

Karon Beach, Phuket
Referees: Yuen (HKG), Wichaiphin (THA)

17 November
10:20

Oman	14–17	Bangladesh
Pts: Al-Hadidi, Al-Sabahi, Al-Souli 4		Pts: Biswas 11

Karon Beach, Phuket
Referees: Jontapa (THA), Mapa (SRI)

17 November
11:20

Maldives	13–21	Oman
Pts: Ifsah, Firash 4		Pts: Al-Hadidi 6

Karon Beach, Phuket
Referees: Mapa (SRI), Jontapa (THA)

17 November
11:40

Qatar	18–11	Turkmenistan
Pts: Ismail 8		Pts: Allanurow 6

Karon Beach, Phuket
Referees: Hashim (IND), Padungratchadakit (THA)

===== Group B =====
Pos	Team	Pld	W	L	PF	PA	PD	Pts
1	India	5	5	0	103	47	+56	10
2	Thailand	5	4	1	64	55	+9	9
3	China	5	3	2	76	70	+6	8
4	Mongolia	5	2	3	83	66	+17	7
5	Bhutan	5	1	4	57	74	−17	6
6	Laos	5	0	5	25	96	−71	5

Source: FIBA

15 November
11:00

India	21–9	Bhutan
Pts: A. Singh 8		Pts: Wangchuk 4

Karon Beach, Phuket
Referees: Yuen (HKG), Padungratchadakit (THA)

15 November
11:20

China	19–6	Laos
Pts: Liu M. 10		Pts: Phonsavanh 4

Karon Beach, Phuket
Referees: Al-Zaabi (UAE), Jontapa (THA)

15 November
11:20

Mongolia	12–14	Thailand
Pts: Batbyamba 5		Pts: Lakhan 6

Karon Beach, Phuket
Referees: Al-Yousef (JOR), Wullandari (INA)

15 November
12:00

Thailand	21–15	China
Pts: Dasom 10		Pts: Liu M. 8

Karon Beach, Phuket
Referees: Leong (SIN), Chubuk (KGZ)

15 November
12:00

Laos	4–21	India
Pts: Phanthady 3		Pts: Bhriguvanshi 8

Karon Beach, Phuket
Referees: Ng (MAS), Hashim (IND)

16 November
10:00

Bhutan	11–17	Mongolia
Pts: Chophel 4		Pts: Sergelen, Sedbazar 5

Karon Beach, Phuket
Referees: Al-Zaabi (UAE), Muongmee (THA)

16 November
10:20

Laos	1–13	Thailand
Pts: Phanthady 1		Pts: Dasom 5

Karon Beach, Phuket
Referees: Leong (SIN), Chubuk (KGZ)

16 November
11:00

Thailand	4–22	India
Pts: Lertmalaiporn 2		Pts: A. Singh 11

Karon Beach, Phuket
Referees: Mapa (SRI), Wullandari (INA)

16 November
11:20

China	15–11	Bhutan
Pts: Liu M. 8		Pts: Dorji 6

Karon Beach, Phuket
Referees: Al-Zaabi (UAE), Jontapa (THA)

16 November
12:00

Mongolia	18–21	India
Pts: Sedbazar 7		Pts: A. Singh 9

Karon Beach, Phuket
Referees: Yuen (HKG), Al-Yousef (JOR)

17 November
10:20

China	15–14	Mongolia
Pts: Liu M. 10		Pts: Batbyamba, Delgernyam 6

Karon Beach, Phuket
Referees: Leong (SIN), Al-Zaabi (UAE)

17 November
10:40

Laos	9–21	Bhutan
Pts: Phanthady 4		Pts: Chophel 7

Karon Beach, Phuket
Referees: Al-Yousef (JOR), Muongmee (THA)

17 November
11:40

Bhutan	5–12	Thailand
Pts: Dorji 3		Pts: Ghogar 7

Karon Beach, Phuket
Referees: Al-Zaabi (UAE), Al-Yousef (JOR)

17 November
12:00

Mongolia	22–5	Laos
Pts: Delgernyam 12		Pts: Phonsavanh 3

Karon Beach, Phuket
Referees: Wullandari (INA), Ng (MAS)

17 November
12:00

India	18–12	China
Pts: P. Singh, A. Singh 6		Pts: Si 6

Karon Beach, Phuket
Referees: Muongmee (THA), Leong (SIN)

==== Knockout round ====
Quarterfinals
18 November
India	21
Turkmenistan	11
18 November
Bangladesh	20
China	19
18 November
Qatar	22
Mongolia	16
18 November
Thailand	16
Oman	9

Semifinals
18 November
India	21
Bangladesh	6
18 November
Qatar	21
Thailand	16

Gold medal game
18 November
India	20
Qatar	21
Bronze medal game
18 November
Bangladesh	15
Thailand	17

===== Quarterfinals =====
18 November
10:00

Bangladesh	20–19	China
Pts: Biswas 10		Pts: Liu M. 12

Karon Beach, Phuket
Referees: Al-Zaabi (UAE), Jontapa (THA)

18 November
10:00

Thailand	16–9	Oman
Pts: Ghogar 7		Pts: Al-Souli 5

Karon Beach, Phuket
Referees: Leong (SIN), Yang (CHN)

18 November
10:20

India	21–11	Turkmenistan
Pts: A. Singh 12		Pts: Paşkow 7

Karon Beach, Phuket
Referees: Mapa (SRI), Al-Yousef (JOR)

18 November
10:20

Qatar	22–16	Mongolia
Pts: Ismail 10		Pts: Batbyamba, Sedbazar 7

Karon Beach, Phuket
Referees: Hashim (IND), Ng (MAS)

===== Semifinals =====
18 November
11:00

India	21–6	Bangladesh
Pts: A. Singh 12		Pts: Biswas 4

Karon Beach, Phuket
Referees: Leong (SIN), Al-Zaabi (UAE)

18 November
11:00

Qatar	21–16	Thailand
Pts: Ismail 8		Pts: Lakhan 6

Karon Beach, Phuket
Referees: Yang (CHN), Yuen (HKG)

===== Bronze medal match =====
18 November
12:00

Bangladesh	15–17	Thailand
Pts: Biswas 9		Pts: Lertmalaiporn 9

Karon Beach, Phuket
Referees: Hashim (IND), Al-Yousef (JOR)

===== Gold medal game =====
18 November
13:00

India	20–21	Qatar
Pts: Bhriguvanshi 8		Pts: Watson 9

Karon Beach, Phuket
Referees: Yuen (HKG), Yang (CHN)

=== Women ===
==== Preliminary ====
===== Group A =====
Pos	Team	Pld	W	L	PF	PA	PD	Pts
1	China	3	3	0	55	38	+17	6
2	Mongolia	3	2	1	46	41	+5	5
3	Philippines	3	1	2	37	42	−5	4
4	India	3	0	3	35	52	−17	3

Source: FIBA

15 November
10:40

Philippines	13–11	India
Pts: Galicia 7		Pts: Priyadharshini 4

Karon Beach, Phuket
Referees: Padungratchadakit (THA), Wullandari (INA)

15 November
10:40

Mongolia	13–18	China
Pts: Bayartsetseg 7		Pts: Huang, An 7

Karon Beach, Phuket
Referees: Muongmee (THA), Chubuk (KGZ)

16 November
10:40

India	12–18	China
Pts: Priyadharshini, Jeena, Poojamol 4		Pts: An 13

Karon Beach, Phuket
Referees: Al-Yousef (JOR), Wichaiphin (THA)

16 November
10:40

Mongolia	12–11	Philippines
Pts: Ganzul, Solongo 5		Pts: Galicia, Tiu, Jacob 3

Karon Beach, Phuket
Referees: Padungratchadakit (THA), Yuen (HKG)

17 November
10:40

China	19–13	Philippines
Pts: Huang 10		Pts: Galicia 5

Karon Beach, Phuket
Referees: Padungratchadakit (THA), Hashim (IND)

17 November
11:20

India	12–21	Mongolia
Pts: Jeena 6		Pts: Ganzul 12

Karon Beach, Phuket
Referees: Wichaiphin (THA), Yuen (HKG)

===== Group B =====
Pos	Team	Pld	W	L	PF	PA	PD	Pts
1	Chinese Taipei	3	3	0	51	23	+28	6
2	Thailand	3	2	1	44	31	+13	5
3	Turkmenistan	3	1	2	32	41	−9	4
4	Nepal	3	0	3	16	48	−32	3

Source: FIBA

15 November
10:20

Chinese Taipei	16–14	Thailand
Pts: Lo 8		Pts: Jantakan 6

Karon Beach, Phuket
Referees: Mapa (SRI), Ng (MAS)

15 November
11:40

Nepal	6–18	Turkmenistan
Pts: Malla 4		Pts: Gokowa, Nagiýewa 7

Karon Beach, Phuket
Referees: Wichaiphin (THA), Hashim (IND)

16 November
10:00

Thailand	15–5	Nepal
Pts: Jantakan 8		Pts: Malla 3

Karon Beach, Phuket
Referees: Ng (MAS), Hashim (IND)

16 November
11:40

Turkmenistan	4–20	Chinese Taipei
Pts: Gokowa 3		Pts: Lo 10

Karon Beach, Phuket
Referees: Wullandari (INA), Padungratchadakit (THA)

17 November
11:00

Chinese Taipei	15–5	Nepal
Pts: Lo 9		Pts: Singh 3

Karon Beach, Phuket
Referees: Ng (MAS), Wullandari (INA)

17 November
11:00

Turkmenistan	10–15	Thailand
Pts: Gokowa 6		Pts: Jantakan 10

Karon Beach, Phuket
Referees: Chubuk (KGZ), Yang (CHN)

==== Knockout round ====
Semifinals
18 November
China	17
Thailand	13
18 November
Chinese Taipei	17
Mongolia	10

Gold medal game
18 November
China	13
Chinese Taipei	15
Bronze medal game
18 November
Thailand	13
Mongolia	7

===== Semifinals =====
18 November
10:40

China	17–13	Thailand
Pts: Huang 11		Pts: Rudrodkij 6

Karon Beach, Phuket
Referees: Yuen (HKG), Chubuk (KGZ)

18 November
10:40

Chinese Taipei	17–10	Mongolia
Pts: Lo 8		Pts: Ganzul 5

Karon Beach, Phuket
Referees: Padungratchadakit (THA), Wullandari (INA)

===== Bronze medal game =====
18 November
11:30

Thailand	13–7	Mongolia
Pts: Jantakan 7		Pts: Ganzul 5

Karon Beach, Phuket
Referees: Mapa (SRI), Wullandari (INA)

===== Gold medal game =====
18 November
12:30

China	13–15	Chinese Taipei
Pts: An 6		Pts: Lo 8

Karon Beach, Phuket
Referees: Leong (SIN), Muongmee (THA)
