= Beach water polo at the 2010 Asian Beach Games =

- Venue: Al-Musannah Sports City
- Dates: 8–12 December 2010

Beach water polo at the 2010 Asian Beach Games was held from 8 December to 12 December 2010 in Muscat, Oman.

Kazakhstan won the gold medal in a round robin competition, Kuwait finished 2nd and Saudi Arabia finished 3rd and won the bronze medal over Syria and Indonesia.

== Medalists ==
Event	Gold	Silver	Bronze
Men	Kazakhstan; Alexey Demchenko; Alexey Shmider; Viktor Salnichenko; Rustam Ukumanov; Murat Shakenov; Alexandr Fenochko; Mikhail Ruday	Athletes from Kuwait; Mohammad Al-Mulla; Mohammad Al-Otaibi; Rashid Al-Shatti; Yousef Bosakhar; Ahmad Mandani; Adnan Khan; Mohammad Ashour	Saudi Arabia; Abdullah Al-Zahrani; Mohammed Al-Harbi; Adel Al-Najjar; Khaled Al-Harbi; Saleh Al-Zahrani; Nasser Al-Dughather; Yousri Al-Laili

== Results ==
Pos	Team	Pld	W	D	L	GF	GA	GD	Pts
1	Kazakhstan	4	4	0	0	62	22	+40	8
2	Athletes from Kuwait	4	3	0	1	44	38	+6	6
3	Saudi Arabia	4	2	0	2	39	43	−4	4
4	Syria	4	1	0	3	32	49	−17	2
5	Indonesia	4	0	0	4	28	53	−25	0

Source: Official website

8 December; 10:00	Athletes from Kuwait	13–10	Syria	Al-Musannah Sports City, Muscat; Referees: Tan Hong Boon (SIN)
8 December; 10:00	Scoring by half: 7–3, 6–7			Al-Musannah Sports City, Muscat; Referees: Tan Hong Boon (SIN)
8 December; 10:00	Bosakhar 4	Goals	four players 2	Al-Musannah Sports City, Muscat; Referees: Tan Hong Boon (SIN)

8 December; 11:00	Indonesia	5–17	Kazakhstan	Al-Musannah Sports City, Muscat; Referees: Abdulaziz Al-Rashedi (KSA)
8 December; 11:00	Scoring by half: 4–10, 1–7			Al-Musannah Sports City, Muscat; Referees: Abdulaziz Al-Rashedi (KSA)
8 December; 11:00	Harahap 3	Goals	Ruday 8	Al-Musannah Sports City, Muscat; Referees: Abdulaziz Al-Rashedi (KSA)

9 December; 14:00	Syria	5–14	Kazakhstan	Al-Musannah Sports City, Muscat; Referees: Anbar Anbar (KUW)
9 December; 14:00	Scoring by half: 3–6, 2–8			Al-Musannah Sports City, Muscat; Referees: Anbar Anbar (KUW)
9 December; 14:00	Ay. Al-Masri 3	Goals	Ukumanov 4	Al-Musannah Sports City, Muscat; Referees: Anbar Anbar (KUW)

9 December; 15:00	Athletes from Kuwait	11–10	Saudi Arabia	Al-Musannah Sports City, Muscat; Referees: Tan Hong Boon (SIN)
9 December; 15:00	Scoring by half: 7–7, 4–3			Al-Musannah Sports City, Muscat; Referees: Tan Hong Boon (SIN)
9 December; 15:00	Mandani 6	Goals	S. Al-Zahrani 4	Al-Musannah Sports City, Muscat; Referees: Tan Hong Boon (SIN)

10 December; 14:00	Kazakhstan	18–3	Saudi Arabia	Al-Musannah Sports City, Muscat; Referees: Tan Hong Boon (SIN)
10 December; 14:00	Scoring by half: 9–2, 9–1			Al-Musannah Sports City, Muscat; Referees: Tan Hong Boon (SIN)
10 December; 14:00	Ukumanov 8	Goals	S. Al-Zahrani 2	Al-Musannah Sports City, Muscat; Referees: Tan Hong Boon (SIN)

10 December; 15:00	Syria	11–10	Indonesia	Al-Musannah Sports City, Muscat; Referees: Anbar Anbar (KUW)
10 December; 15:00	Scoring by half: 4–6, 7–4			Al-Musannah Sports City, Muscat; Referees: Anbar Anbar (KUW)
10 December; 15:00	Ay. Al-Masri 4	Goals	Harahap 4	Al-Musannah Sports City, Muscat; Referees: Anbar Anbar (KUW)

11 December; 14:00	Saudi Arabia	14–8	Indonesia	Al-Musannah Sports City, Muscat; Referees: Tan Hong Boon (SIN)
11 December; 14:00	Scoring by half: 6–5, 8–3			Al-Musannah Sports City, Muscat; Referees: Tan Hong Boon (SIN)
11 December; 14:00	S. Al-Zahrani, Al-Laili 5	Goals	Riandy 4	Al-Musannah Sports City, Muscat; Referees: Tan Hong Boon (SIN)

11 December; 15:00	Kazakhstan	13–9	Athletes from Kuwait	Al-Musannah Sports City, Muscat; Referees: Abdulaziz Al-Rashedi (KSA)
11 December; 15:00	Scoring by half: 10–3, 3–6			Al-Musannah Sports City, Muscat; Referees: Abdulaziz Al-Rashedi (KSA)
11 December; 15:00	Ruday 7	Goals	Bosakhar, Khan 3	Al-Musannah Sports City, Muscat; Referees: Abdulaziz Al-Rashedi (KSA)

12 December; 14:00	Indonesia	5–11	Athletes from Kuwait	Al-Musannah Sports City, Muscat; Referees: Abdulaziz Al-Rashedi (KSA)
12 December; 14:00	Scoring by half: 2–4, 3–7			Al-Musannah Sports City, Muscat; Referees: Abdulaziz Al-Rashedi (KSA)
12 December; 14:00	Harahap 2	Goals	Mandani 4	Al-Musannah Sports City, Muscat; Referees: Abdulaziz Al-Rashedi (KSA)

12 December; 15:00	Saudi Arabia	12–6	Syria	Al-Musannah Sports City, Muscat; Referees: Anbar Anbar (KUW)
12 December; 15:00	Scoring by half: 4–2, 8–4			Al-Musannah Sports City, Muscat; Referees: Anbar Anbar (KUW)
12 December; 15:00	S. Al-Zahrani 4	Goals	Ay. Al-Masri 3	Al-Musannah Sports City, Muscat; Referees: Anbar Anbar (KUW)
