= Mohammad Bagheri Taj Amir =

Iranian athlete

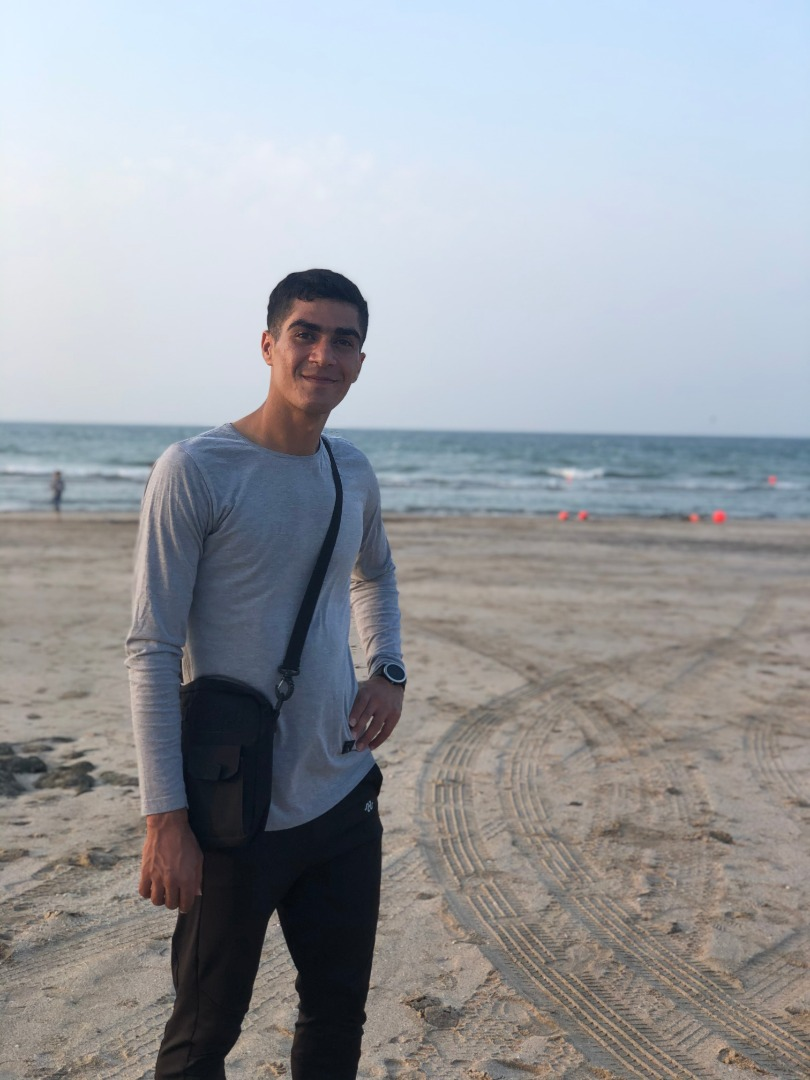

Personal information
- Full name: Mohammad Bagheri Taj Amir
- Nationality: Iranian
- Born: 24 September 1998 (age 27) Nurabad
- Home town: Tehran, Iran
- Height: 182 cm (6 ft 0 in)
- Weight: 70 kg (154 lb)

Sport
- Country: Iran
- Sport: Track and field
- Event(s): 1500 metres, 10K run
- Team: Teammelli
- Coached by: Mehdi Zamani

Achievements and titles
- Personal best(s): 1500m: 4:01 (Iran U20 Champs); 10K: 32:56 (2020 Muscat Marathon)
Medal record
Event	1st	2nd	3rd
Muscat Marathon 10K run	1	1	–
Armenian International Competition 5000 m	–	1	–
Dubai International Running Contest 4K	1	–	–
Baku Marathon Event 1.5K	1	–	–
Asia Championship 1.5K	–	–	1

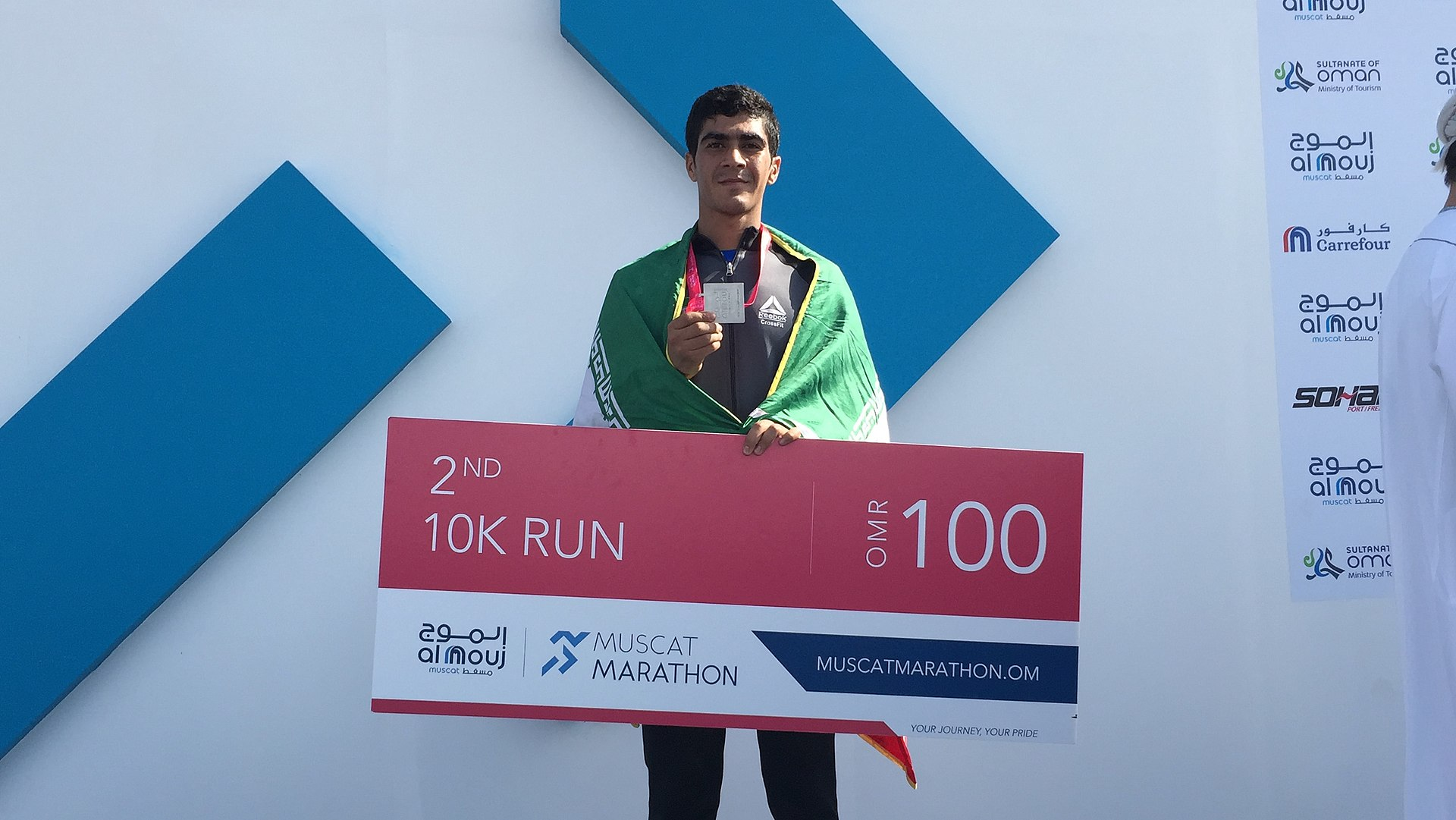
Mohammad Bagheri Taj Amir being the runner-up in Muscat marathon 2019

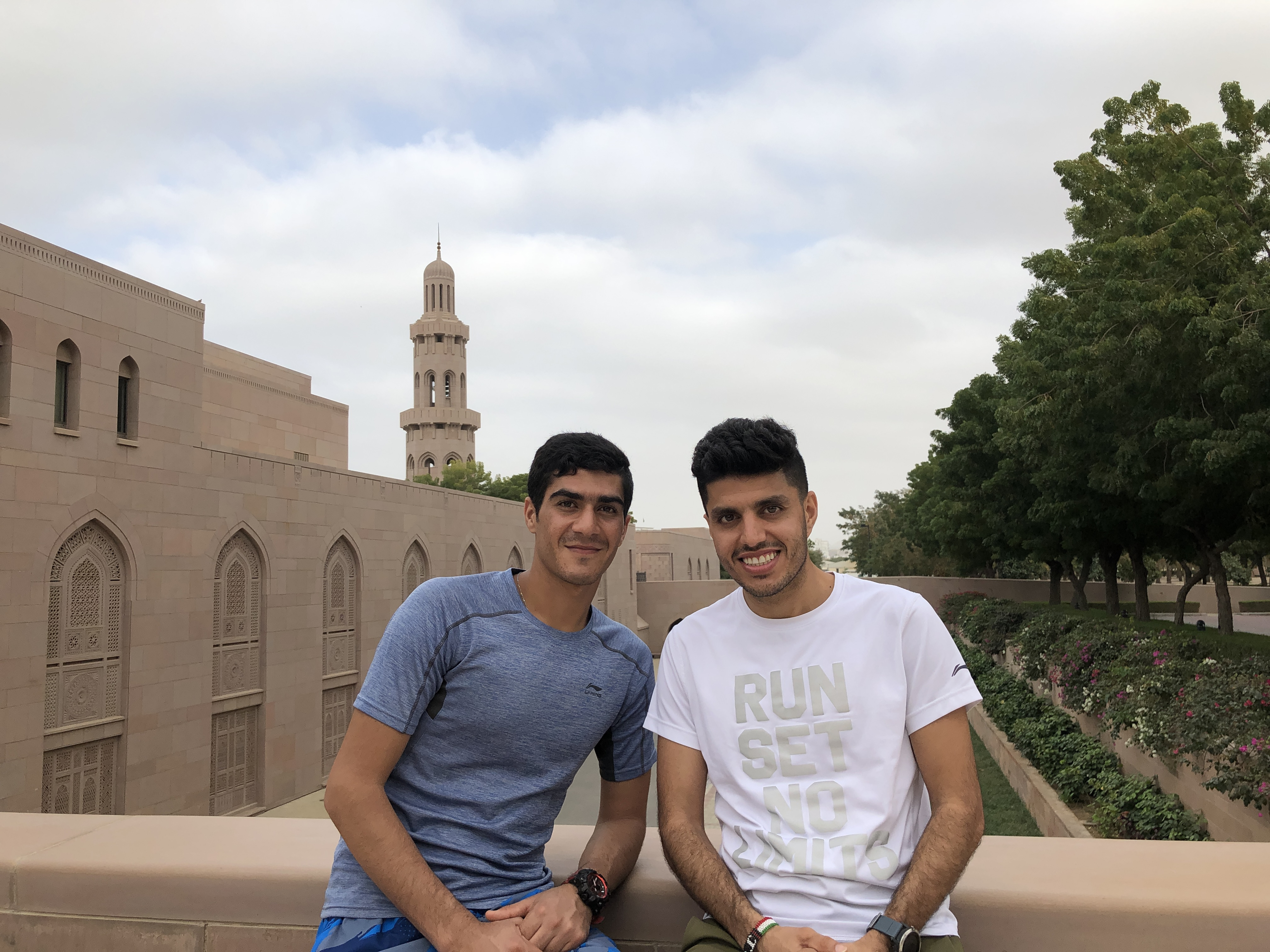
Mohammad Bagheri Taj Amir and Jafar Moradi next to Sultan Qaboos mosque shortly after Muscat marathon 2019 where Bagheri had become the runner-up and Moradi got the 6th place.

Mohammad Bagheri Taj Amir is an Iranian professional runner. He was born in 1998 in Nurabad village of Lorestan province in Iran. He began his athletic career in his early years, winning several inter-school competitions. Later on, he entered the provincial competitions. In 2014, he won the championship of the Iranian junior competitions in the 1500 and 800 meters categories.

== Competitions ==
He won first place in the Western states competitions of Iran and thus became a member of Team Melli, the national team of Iran. He broke a 15-year-old record in the 1500 metres by clocking 4:01. In 2018, Taj Amir won the first place in four kilometer Desert Trail Championship in the Asian Games in Dubai. In the same year, he participated in the five-kilometer adult category at the Armenian International Competition in Yerevan, and won the runner-up title.

In the winter of 2018 and 2019, Taj Amir was the runner-up and winner in the 10K run event at the Muscat Marathon in Muscat, Oman, respectively.
