= Kai Inoue =

Japanese water polo player

Personal information
- Native name: 井上 皆
- Full name: Kai Takeshi Inoue
- Nationality: Japanese
- Born: 21 December 2006 (age 19) Huntington Beach, California, U.S>
- Education: University of California, Berkeley

Sport
- Sport: Water polo
- Position: Attacker
Medal record
Men's water polo
Representing Japan
Asian Games
Gold medal – first place	2026 Aichi–Nagoya	Team

Kai Takeshi Inoue (Japanese: 井上 皆; born 21 December 2006) is a Japanese water polo player who plays as an attacker. He represents Japan internationally and competed at the 2024 Summer Olympics in Paris. He won a gold medal as a member of the Japanese team at the 2026 Asian Games.

== Career ==
Inoue was born in Huntington Beach, California, and grew up in a family with a strong water polo background. His grandfather, Hiroshi Inoue, won a gold medal at the 1962 Asian Games, while his father, Takeshi Inoue, was a member of the Japanese national team and later served on international water polo technical committees. Inoue began playing water polo at his father's United Water Polo Club and also gained international experience through youth competition in Europe and the United States.

After returning to Japan, Inoue played for Kyoto Tousuikai and attended Kyoto Toba High School. He represented the school in national competitions and was selected for the Japanese senior national team while still a high school student.

In 2024, Inoue was selected for Japan's squad at the 2024 Summer Olympics. At 17, he was one of the youngest members of the Japanese men's water polo team. Japan finished 11th after being eliminated in the preliminary round.

In the same year, Inoue received the men's youth water polo MVP award at the SAGA2024 national sports festival while representing Kyoto and Kyoto Toba High School.

In 2025, Inoue was selected for Japan's squad at the Asian Water Polo Championships. He was listed as a field player for Kyoto Toba High School.

In 2025, Inoue began playing for the California Golden Bears at the University of California, Berkeley. In his freshman season, he scored 23 goals in 23 games, with 17 assists and 40 total points. He scored a career-high five goals against UC Santa Barbara and recorded seven points against Air Force.

In 2026, Inoue continued playing for California as a sophomore while also representing Japan internationally. He was selected for Japan's men's water polo team at the 2026 Asian Games in Aichi-Nagoya, where he was listed as a field player for Bourbon Water Polo Club Kashiwazaki. At the Asian Games, Inoue scored five goals in Japan's 30–4 victory over Thailand in the group stage, ranking second on the Japanese team in scoring in the match. Japan defeated Singapore 32–8 in the quarter-finals and Iran 26–12 in the semi-finals before meeting Kazakhstan in the final. Japan defeated Kazakhstan 24–7 on 3 October 2026 to win the gold medal and successfully defend its Asian Games title.
