= Altay Altayev =

Kazakhstani water polo player

Personal information
- Native name: Алтай Тургумбекович Альтаев
- Full name: Altay Turgumbekovich Altayev
- Born: 14 February 1996 (age 30) Taraz, Kazakhstan

Sport
- Country: Kazakhstan
- Sport: Water polo
Medal record
Representing Kazakhstan
Asian Games
Gold medal – first place	2018 Jakarta	Team competition
Asian Beach Games
Gold medal – first place	2016 Da Nang	Team competition
Asian Aquatics Championships
Silver medal – second place	2016 Tokyo	Team competition

Altay Altayev (Алтай Альтаев, born 14 February 1996) is a Kazakhstani water polo player. He competed in the men's tournament at the 2020 Summer Olympics.
