= Daichi Ogihara =

Japanese water polo player

Personal information
- Nationality: Japanese
- Born: 17 March 2003 (age 23) Kagoshima Prefecture, Japan
- Education: Nippon Sport Science University

Sport
- Sport: Water polo
- Position: Field player
Medal record
Men's water polo
Representing Japan
Asian Games
Gold medal – first place	2022 Hangzhou	Team
Gold medal – first place	2026 Aichi-Nagoya	Team

Daichi Ogihara (Japanese: 荻原大地; born 17 March 2003) is a Japanese water polo player who plays as a field player. He represents Japan internationally and competed at the 2024 Summer Olympics. He won gold medals with Japan at the 2022 Asian Games and the 2026 Asian Games.

== Career ==
Ogihara was born in Kagoshima Prefecture and attended Kagoshima Minami High School before studying at Nippon Sport Science University. He competed for the university's water polo team and developed into a member of the Japanese senior national team.

In 2023, Ogihara represented Japan at the 2022 Asian Games, which were held in Hangzhou after being postponed from 2022. Japan won the men's water polo tournament, defeating China in the final to claim the gold medal. Ogihara was part of the Japanese squad that went undefeated throughout the competition.

The same year, Ogihara was selected for Japan's team at the 2023 Men's U20 Water Polo World Championship. He was listed as a field player in the Japanese squad.

In 2024, Ogihara was selected for Japan's men's water polo team at the 2024 Summer Olympics in Paris. Japan finished 11th in the tournament. He was one of the field players on the Olympic roster.

In 2025, Ogihara continued as a member of the Japanese national team and represented Japan at the 2025 World Aquatics Championships in Singapore. He was listed as a field player for Japan alongside other members of the Paris Olympic team.

In 2026, Ogihara continued to represent Japan internationally and was selected for the men's water polo team at the 2026 Asian Games in Aichi-Nagoya. He was listed as a field player and represented Kankyō Kiki Co., Ltd. and IKAI・Kingfisher74.

At the Asian Games, Japan advanced to the men's water polo final against Kazakhstan. On 3 October 2026, Japan defeated Kazakhstan 24–7 to win the gold medal and successfully defend its Asian Games title. Ogihara scored one goal in the final and contributed to Japan's second consecutive men's water polo gold medal.
