= Bhutan at the 2016 Asian Beach Games =

- IOC code: BHU
- NOC: Bhutan Olympic Committee

in Đà Nẵng
- Competitors: 8 in 1 sport
- Medals Ranked 35th: Gold 0 Silver 0 Bronze 0 Total 0

Asian Beach Games appearances
- 2010; 2012; 2014; 2016

Bhutan competed at the 2016 Asian Beach Games held in Danang, Vietnam from 24 September to 3 October 2016. It did not win any medals.

== Competitors ==
Sport	Men	Women	Total
3x3 Basketball	4	4	8
Total	4	4	8
