= Mikhail Ruday =

Kazakhstani water polo player

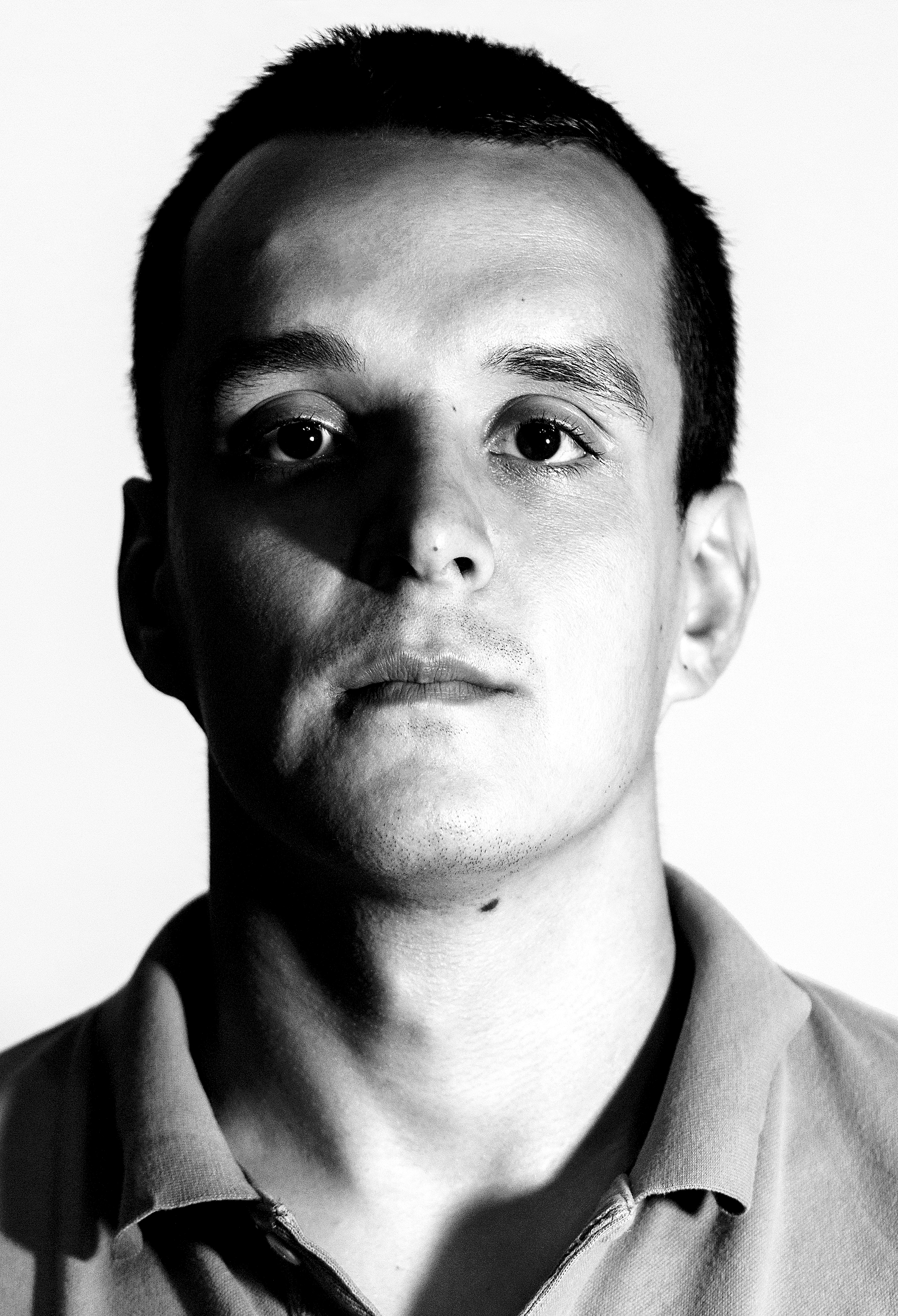
- Ruday in 2014

Personal information
- Native name: Михаил Андреевич Рудай
- Full name: Mikhail Andreyevich Ruday
- Born: 14 May 1988 (age 38) Alma-Ata, Kazakh SSR, Soviet Union
- Height: 193 cm (6 ft 4 in)
- Weight: 95 kg (209 lb)

Sport
- Country: Kazakhstan
- Sport: Water polo
Medal record
Men's water polo
Representing Kazakhstan
Asian Games
Gold medal – first place	2010 Guangzhou	Team
Gold medal – first place	2018 Jakarta	Team
Silver medal – second place	2026 Aichi–Nagoya	Team
Bronze medal – third place	2022 Hangzhou	Team
Asian Beach Games
Gold medal – first place	2010 Muscat	Team
Asian Aquatics Championships
Silver medal – second place	2012 Dubai	Team
Silver medal – second place	2016 Tokyo	Team
Bronze medal – third place	2025 Ahmedabad	Team

Mikhail Ruday (Михаил Рудай, born 4 May 1988) is a Kazakhstani water polo player. At the 2012 Summer Olympics, he competed for the Kazakhstan men's national water polo team in the men's event. He is 6 ft 4 inches tall.

Ruday also represented Kazakhstan at the 2020 Summer Olympics.
