= Alessia Ferrari =

Italian water polo referee

- Born: 1989 (age 36–37); Genoa
- Occupation: Water polo referee

Alessia Ferrari (born 1989) is an Italian water polo referee, who has officiated in major international competitions, including the 2022 European Championships, 2023 World Championships, and the 2024 Olympic Games in Paris.

Presently she holds a Women’s A+ category ranking among European water polo referees, and she is considered as one of the most experienced water polo referees.

== Early life ==
Ferrari grew up in Genoa and began playing water polo with the local club in Bogliasco, later also engaging in synchronized swimming. She graduated in naval engineering and is affectionately nicknamed "micro" for her petite stature.

== Refereeing career ==
Ferrari made her Serie A1 debut as a referee in November 2017. She advanced through the ranks to become Italy’s top-tier woman official.

In the 2022 European Women’s Championships in Split, she was assigned to referee the gold-medal final between Spain and Greece, alongside Croatian Nenad Peris.

In 2023, she officiated at the World Championships in Fukuoka and was one of eight women appointed to referee both women’s and men’s matches at the senior level, contributing to increased gender equity in elite officiating.

A 2024 European Aquatics grading placed Ferrari at the very top of the Women’s A+ category, above all other female referees.

She regularly officiates in club competitions, including the LEN Champions League Women.

In March 2024, Ferrari was selected by World Aquatics as one of two Italian referees, alongside Raffaele Colombo, for the Paris 2024 Olympic Games, marking her Olympic debut. She officiated five women’s tournament matches in Paris.

Ferrari is a member of the Women’s Committee of the World Waterpolo Referee Association, representing Italy among other international officials.

== Personal life ==
Ferrari enjoys photography, traveling (especially to Andalusia), and trofie al pesto. Ferrari has served as ambassador and testimonial for Genova European Capital of Sport since 2019.
