= Ali Pirouzkhah =

Iranian water polo player

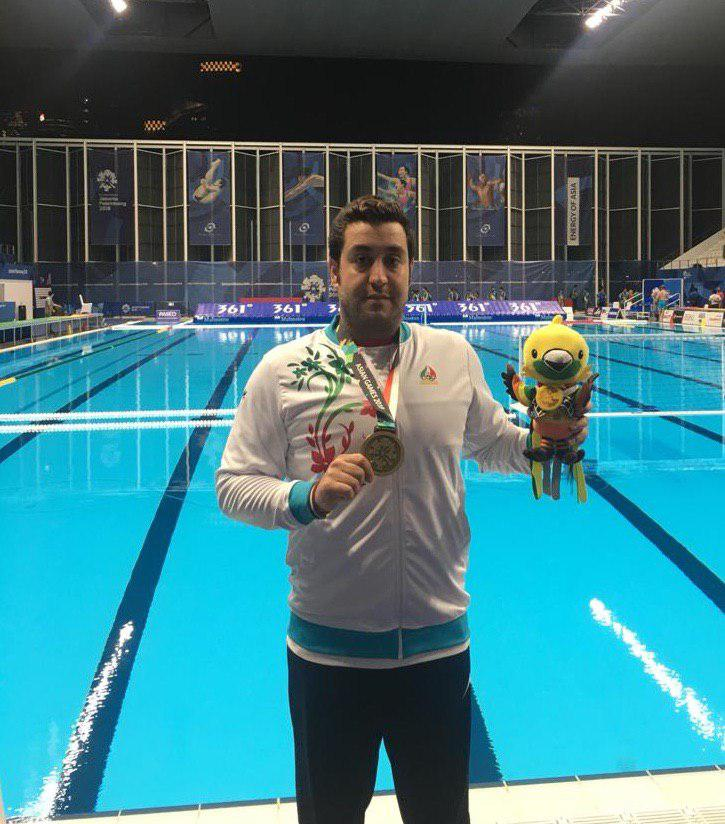
- Pirouzkhah, 2019

Personal information
- Nationality: Iran
- Born: 6 May 1988 (age 38) Tehran, Iran
- Education: Physical education
- Height: 187 cm (6 ft 2 in)
- Weight: 105 kg (231 lb)

Sport
- Country: Iran
- Sport: Water polo
Medal record
Representing Iran
Asian Games
Bronze medal – third place	2018 Jakarta	Team
Islamic Solidarity Games
Silver medal – second place	2017 Baku	Team
Asian Beach Games
Silver medal – second place	2014 Phuket	Team

Ali Pirouzkhah (Persian: علی پیروزخواه, born 6 May 1988) is a retired Iranian water polo player. He is the former captain of the Iran Water polo national team he retired from the international water polo after winning the bronze medal at the 2018 Asian Games in Jakarta. Currently he is the head coach of the national youth team and is responsible for the talent of the Iranian Water Polo Federation.

== Education ==
1. Master of Sport Management, Islamic Azad University, Tehran Branch, Tehran, Iran
2. Bachelor of Physical Education, University of Tehran, Year

== Refereeing and coaching ==
1. Holder of Second and Third degree Water Polo Certificate
2. Holder of Waterloo Arbitration Certificate 2nd degree
3. Holder of 2nd and 3rd degree Coaching Certificate
4. Deep Rescue Certificate Holder
