= Karon Beach =

Beach in Phuket, Thailand

Coordinates: 7°51′40″N 98°17′30″E

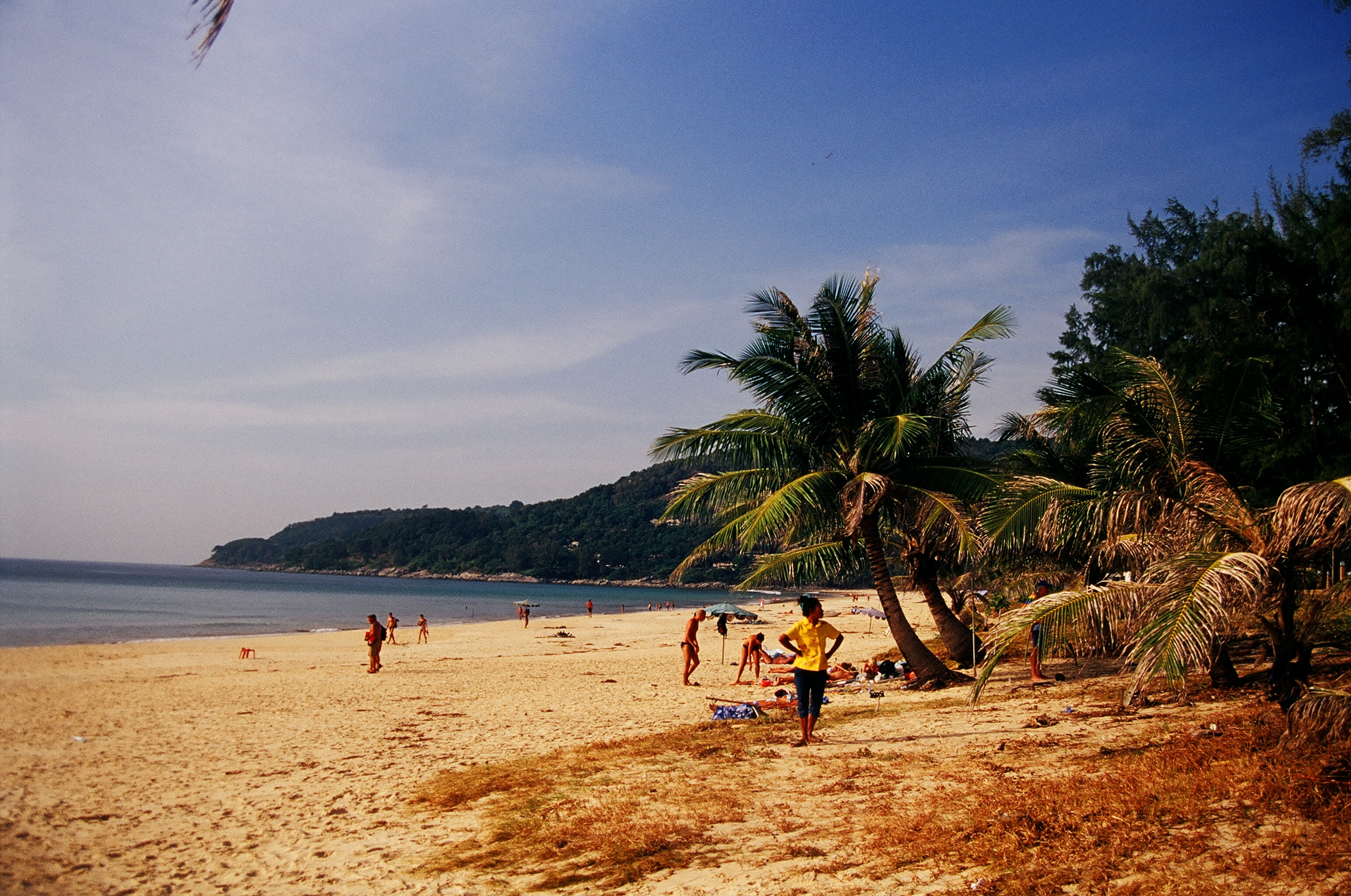
Karon Beach, December 2004.

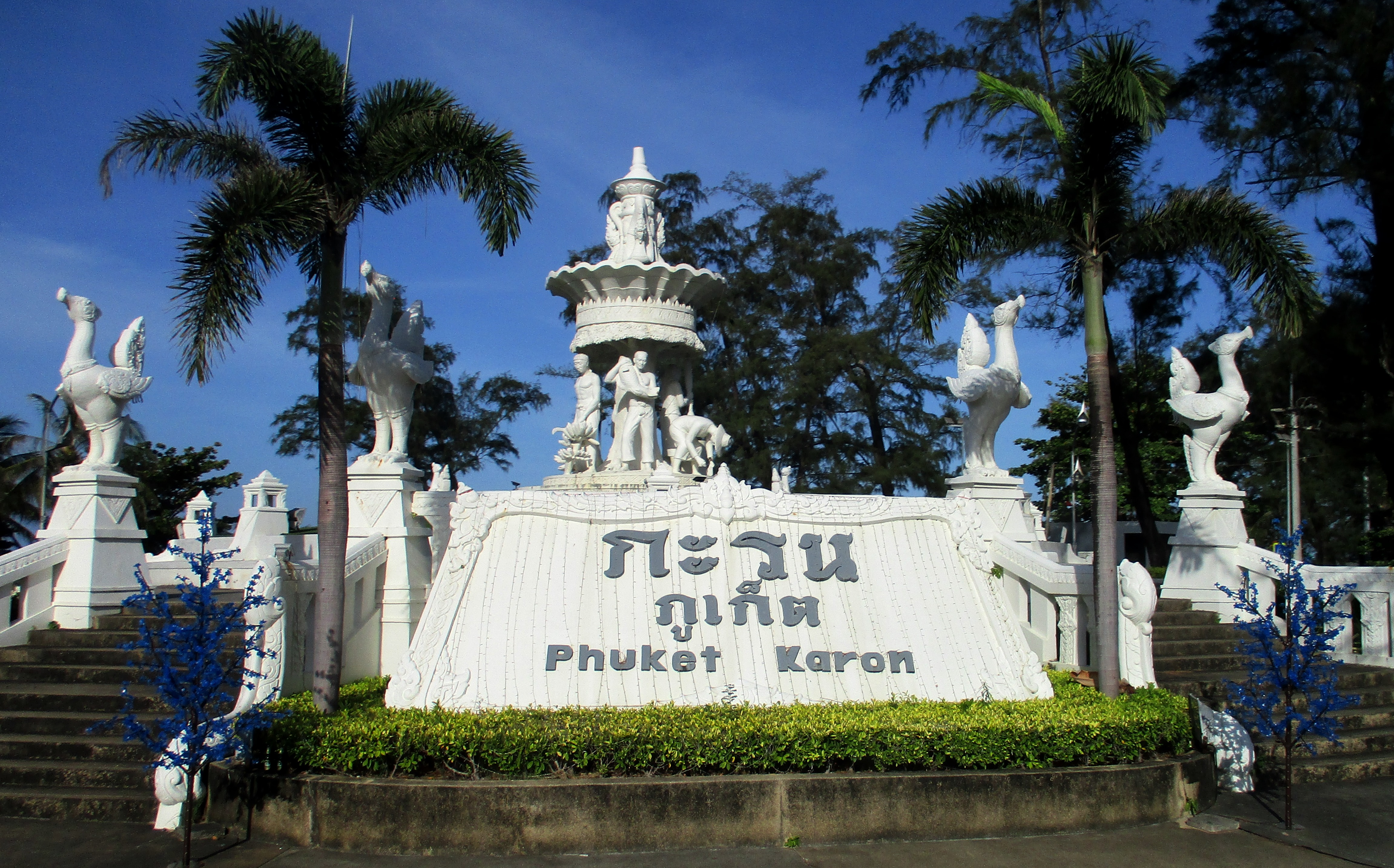
Karon sign

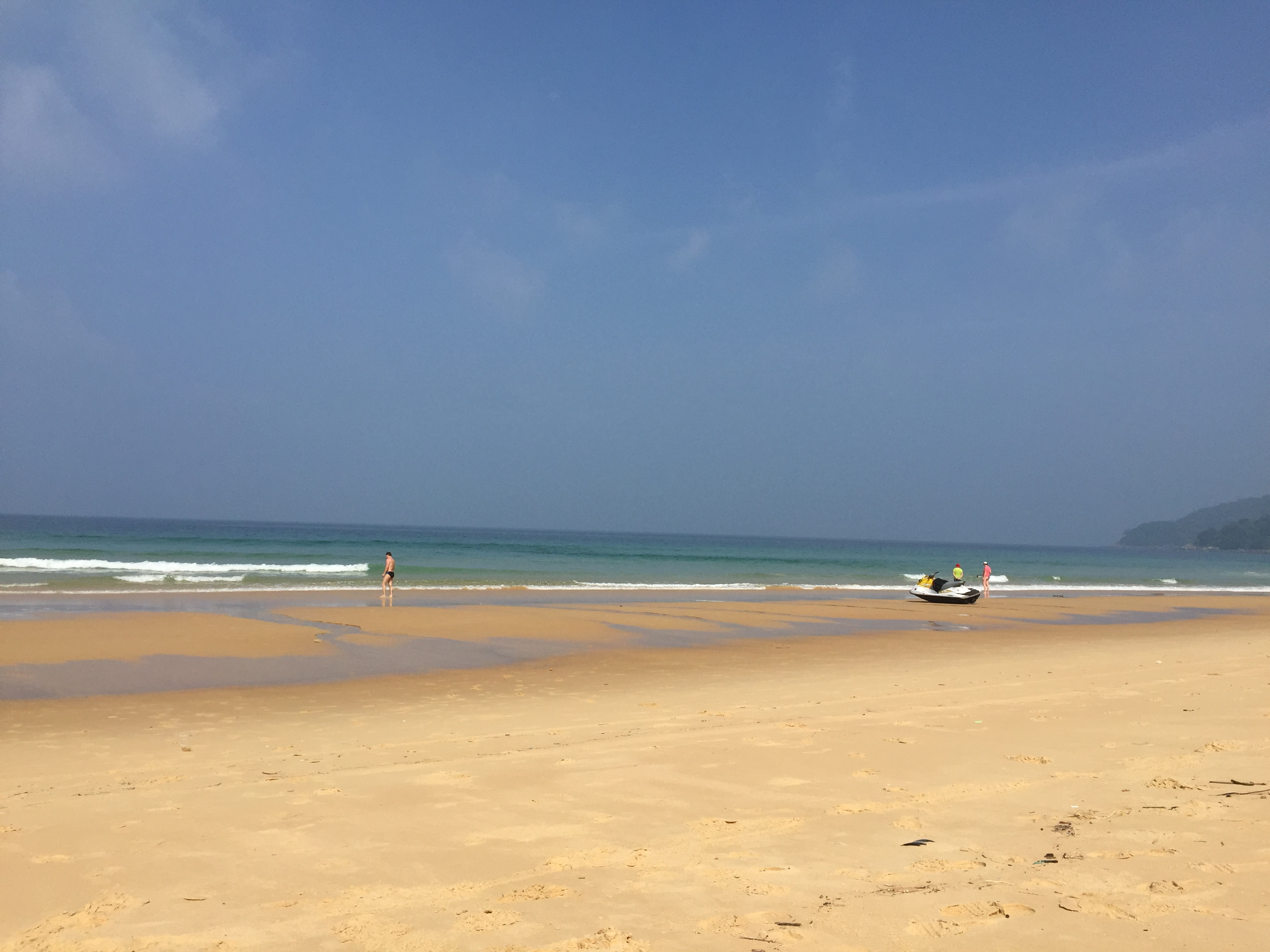
Karon beach

Karon Beach (Thai: หาดกะรน, RTGS: Hat Karon, pronounced [hàːt kā.rōn]) refers to a beach, and the town adjoining it, on the west coast of Phuket, Thailand. It is considered as the second longest beach in the province.

The beach is a popular destination for tourists. Generally quieter than neighbouring Patong, it is popular with families and couples. It is also especially popular with Scandinavian tourists, with many businesses catering especially to them.

== History ==
Karon Beach was heavily damaged by the tsunamis following the 2004 Indian Ocean earthquake, especially in its southern regions, but has since largely recovered and by 2008 showed little evidence of tsunami damage.
