= David Gómez (water polo referee) =

Spanish water polo referee

David Gómez (born 18 February 1985) is a Spanish water polo referee known for officiating at top-level international tournaments, including the Olympic Games and World Aquatics Championships.

== Career ==
Gómez began his refereeing career in national leagues under the supervision of the Real Federación Española de Natación (RFEN). He quickly gained recognition within Spain’s water polo community for his understanding of the game and was soon promoted to international events.

He became an accredited international referee with FINA and LEN in the 2010s. Since then, he has officiated matches in major competitions including the LEN Champions League, the European Water Polo Championship, and multiple FINA World Aquatics Championships.

In 2021, Gómez was selected to referee at the 2020 Summer Olympics in Tokyo, which were delayed due to the COVID-19 pandemic.

== Recognition ==
Gómez has contributed to training workshops and referee development programs organized by RFEN and LEN, mentoring new officials entering the sport. He has been recognized within the Spanish officiating community with multiple commendations and continues to play a key role in improving officiating standards.

In 2024, Gómez was one of the lead officials in the men's final at the European Championships in Dubrovnik, a high-profile match between Hungary and Croatia, and in July 2025 he officiated critical matches, including the men bronze-medal final game (Greece vs. Serbia) in the 2025 World Water Polo Championships held in Singapore.
