= Geography of water polo =

Water polo around the world

Water polo is a full-contact sport played in many countries around the world. The sport's international governing body is FINA.

Some countries have two principal competitions: a more prestigious league which is typically a double round-robin tournament restricted to the elite clubs, and a cup which is a single-elimination tournament open to both the elite and lesser clubs.

== World ==
Governing body	Number of members associations	Main men's competition(s)		Main women's competition(s)	
Governing body	Number of members associations	National	Club	National	Club
International Swimming Federation (FINA)	209	Summer Olympics	—N/a	Summer Olympics	—N/a
International Swimming Federation (FINA)	209	World Aquatics Championships	—N/a	World Aquatics Championships	—N/a
International Swimming Federation (FINA)	209	Men's World Cup	—N/a	Women's World Cup	—N/a
International Swimming Federation (FINA)	209	Men's World League	—N/a	Women's World League	—N/a

== Continental governing bodies ==
World map of FINA's five continental governing bodies.

Continent	Governing body	Number of FINA member associations
Africa	African Swimming Confederation (CANA)	52
Americas	Swimming Union of the Americas (ASUA or UANA)	45
Asia	Asia Swimming Federation (AASF)	45
Europe	European Swimming League (LEN)	52
Oceania	Oceania Swimming Association (OSA)	15

== Africa ==
Continent	Governing body	FINA members	Main men's competition(s)		Main women's competition(s)	
Continent	Governing body	FINA members	National	Club	National	Club
Africa	African Swimming Confederation (CANA)	52	African Championship	—N/a	African Championship	—N/a

=== By country ===
==== National associations ====
Country	FINA code	Overview	National association
Algeria	ALG		Algerian Swimming Federation
Angola	ANG		Angolan Swimming Federation
Benin	BEN		Benin Swimming Federation
Botswana	BOT		Botswana Swimming Sport Association
Burkina Faso	BUR		Burkinabé Swimming and Life Saving Federation
Burundi	BDI		Burundi Swimming Federation
Cameroon	CMR		Cameroon Swimming and Life Saving Federation
Cape Verde	CPV		Cape Verde Swimming Federation
Central African Republic	CAF		Central African Republic Swimming Federation
Chad	CHA		Chadian Amateur Swimming Federation
Comoros	COM		Comoros Swimming Federation
Congo	CGO		Congolese Amateur Swimming Federation
DR Congo	COD		Swimming Federation of the Democratic Republic of Congo
Country	FINA code	Overview	National association
Djibouti	DJI		Djibouti Swimming Federation
Egypt	EGY		Egyptian Swimming Federation
Equatorial Guinea	GEQ		Equatorial Guinean Swimming Federation
Eritrea	ERI		Eritrean Swimming Federation
Ethiopia	ETH		Ethiopian Swimming Federation
Gabon	GAB		Gabonese Swimming Federation
Gambia	GAM		Gambia Swimming and Aquatics Sports Association
Ghana	GHA		Ghana Swimming Association
Guinea	GUI		Guineenne Federation of Swimming and Rescue
Guinea-Bissau	GBS		Swimming Federation of Guinea-Bissau
Ivory Coast	CIV		Ivorian Federation of Swimming and Rescue
Kenya	KEN		Kenya Swimming Federation
Lesotho	LES		Lesotho Swimmers Association
Country	FINA code	Overview	National association
Liberia	LBR		Liberia National Swimming Federation
Libya	LBA		Libyan Swimming Federation
Madagascar	MAD		Malagasy Swimming Federation
Malawi	MAW		Malawi Aquatic Union
Mali	MLI		Malian Swimming Federation
Mauritania	MTN		Mauritanian Swimming Federation
Mauritius	MRI		Mauritius Swimming Federation
Morocco	MAR		Royal Moroccan Swimming Federation
Mozambique	MOZ		Mozambican Swimming Federation
Namibia	NAM		Namibia Swimming Union
Niger	NIG		Nigerian Water Sports Federation
Nigeria	NGR		Nigeria Swimming Federation
Rwanda	RWA		Rwandan Amateur Swimming Federation
Country	FINA code	Overview	National association
Senegal	SEN		Senegalese Swimming and Rescue Federation
Seychelles	SEY		Seychelles Swimming Association
Sierra Leone	SLE		Sierra Leone Amateur Swimming, Diving and Water Polo Association
Somalia	SOM		Somali Swimming Federation
South Africa	RSA		Swimming South Africa
Sudan	SUD		Sudan Amateur Swimming Association
Swaziland	SWZ		Swaziland National Swimming Association
Tanzania	TAN		Tanzania Swimming Federation
Togo	TOG		Togolese Swimming Federation
Tunisia	TUN		Tunisian Swimming Federation
Uganda	UGA		Uganda Swimming Federation
Zambia	ZAM		Zambia Amateur Swimming Union
Zimbabwe	ZIM		Zimbabwe Aquatic Union
Country	FINA code	Overview	National association

==== Competitions and teams ====
Legend

- NT – National water polo teams that competed at the Summer Olympics
- NT – National water polo teams that were Olympic champions
- NT – National water polo teams that finished in their best ever position of second at the Summer Olympics
- NT – National water polo teams that finished in their best ever position of third at the Summer Olympics
- NT – National water polo teams that finished in their best ever position of fourth at the Summer Olympics
- Host – Hosts of the Summer Olympics

Country	National teams		List of Clubs	Men's competitions		Women's competitions		International competitions hosted
Country	Men's	Women's	List of Clubs	Top division	Domestic cup	Top division	Domestic cup	International competitions hosted
Algeria	Men's NT							Host
Angola								
Benin								
Botswana								
Burkina Faso								
Burundi								
Cameroon								
Cape Verde								
Central African Republic								
Chad								
Comoros								
Congo								
DR Congo								
Country	National teams		List of Clubs	Men's competitions		Women's competitions		International competitions hosted
Country	Men's	Women's	List of Clubs	Top division	Domestic cup	Top division	Domestic cup	International competitions hosted
Djibouti								
Egypt	Men's NT		Clubs					
Equatorial Guinea								
Eritrea								
Ethiopia								
Gabon								
Gambia								
Ghana								
Guinea								
Guinea-Bissau								
Ivory Coast								
Kenya								
Lesotho								
Country	National teams		List of Clubs	Men's competitions		Women's competitions		International competitions hosted
Country	Men's	Women's	List of Clubs	Top division	Domestic cup	Top division	Domestic cup	International competitions hosted
Liberia								
Libya								
Madagascar								
Malawi								
Mali								
Mauritania								
Mauritius								
Morocco	Men's NT							Host
Mozambique								
Namibia								
Niger								
Nigeria								
Rwanda								
Country	National teams		List of Clubs	Men's competitions		Women's competitions		International competitions hosted
Country	Men's	Women's	List of Clubs	Top division	Domestic cup	Top division	Domestic cup	International competitions hosted
Senegal								
Seychelles								
Sierra Leone								
Somalia								
South Africa	Men's NT	Women's NT						
Sudan								
Swaziland								
Tanzania								
Togo								
Tunisia	Men's NT							Host
Uganda								
Zambia								
Zimbabwe								
Country	Men's	Women's	List of Clubs	Top division	Domestic cup	Top division	Domestic cup	International competitions hosted
Country	National teams		List of Clubs	Men's competitions		Women's competitions		International competitions hosted

== Americas ==
Continent	Governing body	FINA members	Main men's competition(s)		Main women's competition(s)	
Continent	Governing body	FINA members	National	Club	National	Club
Americas	Swimming Union of the Americas (ASUA or UANA)	45	Pan American Games	—N/a	Pan American Games	—N/a
Americas	Swimming Union of the Americas (ASUA or UANA)	45	ASUA Cup (UANA Cup)	—N/a	ASUA Cup (UANA Cup)	—N/a

=== By country ===
==== National associations ====
Country	FINA code	Overview	National association
Anguilla	AGU		Anguilla Amateur Swimming Association
Antigua and Barbuda	ANT		Antigua and Barbuda Amateur Swimming Association
Argentina	ARG		Argentinian Confederation of Water Sports
Aruba	ARU		Aruba Swimming Federation
Bahamas	BAH		Bahamas Swimming Federation
Barbados	BAR		Barbados Amateur Swimming Association
Belize	BIZ		Belize Swimming Federation
Bermuda	BER		Bermuda Amateur Swimming Association
Bolivia	BOL		Swimming Federation of Bolivia
Brazil	BRA		Brazilian Confederation of Aquatic Sports
British Virgin Islands	IVB		British Virgin Islands Swimming Association
Canada	CAN		Water Polo Canada
Cayman Islands	CAY		Cayman Islands Amateur Swimming Association
Chile	CHI		Chilean Federation of Aquatics Sport
Colombia	COL		Colombian Swimming Federation
Country	FINA code	Overview	National association
Costa Rica	CRC		Costa Rican Swimming Federation
Cuba	CUB		Cuban Swimming Federation
Curaçao	CUR		Curaçao Aquatics Federation
Dominica	DMA		Dominica Amateur Swimming Association
Dominican Republic	DOM		Dominican Swimming Federation
Ecuador	ECU		Ecuadorian Swimming Federation
El Salvador	ESA		Salvadoran Swimming Federation
Grenada	GRN		Grenada Amateur Swimming Association
Guatemala	GUA		National Federation of Swimming, Diving, Water Polo and Synchronised Swimming
Guyana	GUY		Guyana Amateur Swimming Association
Haiti	HAI		Haitian Federation of Aquatic Sports
Honduras	HON		Honduran Swimming Federation
Jamaica	JAM		Amateur Swimming Association of Jamaica
Mexico	MEX		Mexican Swimming Federation
Nicaragua	NCA		Nicaragua Swimming Federation
Country	FINA code	Overview	National association
Panama	PAN		Panama Swimming Federation
Paraguay	PAR		Paraguayan Swimming Federation
Peru	PER		Peruvian Swimming Federation
Puerto Rico	PUR		Puerto Rican Swimming Federation
Saint Kitts and Nevis	SKN		Saint Kitts and Nevis Swimming Federation
Saint Lucia	LCA		Saint Lucia Amateur Swimming Association
Saint Vincent and the Grenadines	VIN		Saint Vincent and the Grenadines Swimming Federation
Sint Maarten	MAA		Sint Maarten Swimming Association
Suriname	SUR		Suriname Swimming Federation
Trinidad and Tobago	TTO		Amateur Swimming Association of Trinidad and Tobago
Turks and Caicos Islands	TCN		Turks and Caicos Islands National Swimming Association
United States	USA	Water polo in the United States	USA Water Polo
U.S. Virgin Islands	ISV		Virgin Islands Swimming Federation
Uruguay	URU		Uruguayan Swimming Federation
Venezuela	VEN		Venezuelan Aquatics Federation
Country	FINA code	Overview	National association

==== Competitions and teams ====
Legend

- NT – National water polo teams that competed at the Summer Olympics
- NT – National water polo teams that were Olympic champions
- NT – National water polo teams that finished in their best ever position of second at the Summer Olympics
- NT – National water polo teams that finished in their best ever position of third at the Summer Olympics
- NT – National water polo teams that finished in their best ever position of fourth at the Summer Olympics
- Host – Hosts of the Summer Olympics

Country	National teams		List of Clubs	Men's competitions		Women's competitions		International competitions hosted
Country	Men's	Women's	List of Clubs	Top division	Domestic cup	Top division	Domestic cup	International competitions hosted
Anguilla								
Antigua and Barbuda								
Argentina	Men's NT							Host
Aruba								
Bahamas								
Barbados								
Belize								
Bermuda								
Bolivia								
Brazil	Men's NT	Women's NT	Clubs	Brazilian League		Brazilian League		Host
British Virgin Islands								
Canada	Men's NT	Women's NT	Clubs	National Championship League	Goulden Cup	National Championship League (women's)		Host
Cayman Islands								
Chile	Men's NT							
Colombia	Men's NT							Host
Country	National teams		List of Clubs	Men's competitions		Women's competitions		International competitions hosted
Country	Men's	Women's	List of Clubs	Top division	Domestic cup	Top division	Domestic cup	International competitions hosted
Costa Rica								
Cuba	Men's NT	Women's NT						Host
Curaçao								
Dominica								
Dominican Republic								Host
Ecuador								Host
El Salvador								
Grenada								
Guatemala								
Guyana								
Haiti								
Honduras								
Jamaica								
Mexico	Men's NT	Women's NT						Host
Nicaragua								
Country	National teams		List of Clubs	Men's competitions		Women's competitions		International competitions hosted
Country	Men's	Women's	List of Clubs	Top division	Domestic cup	Top division	Domestic cup	International competitions hosted
Panama								
Paraguay								
Peru								Host
Puerto Rico	Men's NT	Women's NT						Host
Saint Kitts and Nevis								
Saint Lucia								
Saint Vincent and the Grenadines								
Sint Maarten								
Suriname								
Trinidad and Tobago	Men's NT							
Turks and Caicos Islands								
United States	Men's NT	Women's NT	Clubs	National League				Host
U.S. Virgin Islands								
Uruguay	Men's NT							
Venezuela	Men's NT	Women's NT						Host
Country	Men's	Women's	List of Clubs	Top division	Domestic cup	Top division	Domestic cup	International competitions hosted
Country	National teams		List of Clubs	Men's competitions		Women's competitions		International competitions hosted

== Asia ==
Continent	Governing body	FINA members	Main men's competition(s)		Main women's competition(s)	
Continent	Governing body	FINA members	National	Club	National	Club
Asia	Asia Swimming Federation (AASF)	45	Asian Games	Asian Clubs Championships	Asian Games	—N/a
Asia	Asia Swimming Federation (AASF)	45	Asian Water Polo Championship	—N/a	Asian Water Polo Championship	—N/a
Asia	Asia Swimming Federation (AASF)	45	Asian Swimming Championships	—N/a	Asian Swimming Championships	—N/a

=== By country ===
==== National associations ====
Notes:

- The national associations below are members of the European Swimming League (LEN):
  - (Armenia) Armenian Swimming Federation
  - Swimming Federation of Azerbaijan
  - Cyprus Swimming Federation
  - (Georgia (country)) Georgian Aquatic Sports Federation
  - Israel Swimming Association
  - (Russia) Russian Water Polo Federation
  - (Turkey) Turkish Swimming Federation
- The national association below is a member of the African Swimming Confederation (CANA):
  - (Egypt) Egyptian Swimming Federation

Country	FINA code	Overview	National association
Afghanistan	AFG		Afghanistan National Swimming Federation
Bahrain	BRN		Bahrain Swimming Association
Bangladesh	BAN		Bangladesh Swimming Federation
Bhutan	BHU		Bhutan Aquatics Federation
Brunei	BRU		Brunei Amateur Swimming Association
Cambodia	CAM		Khmer Amateur Swimming Federation
China	CHN		Chinese Swimming Association
Hong Kong	HKG		Hong Kong Amateur Swimming Association
India	IND	Water polo in India	Swimming Federation of India
Indonesia	INA		Indonesian Swimming Federation
Iran	IRI		Iran Amateur Swimming Federation
Iraq	IRQ		Iraqi Swimming Federation
Japan	JPN		Japan Swimming Federation
Jordan	JOR		Jordan Swimming Federation
Kazakhstan	KAZ		Swimming Federation of the Republic of Kazakhstan
Country	FINA code	Overview	National association
North Korea	PRK		Amateur Swimming Association of the Democratic People's Republic of Korea
South Korea	KOR		Korea Swimming Federation
Kuwait	KUW		Kuwait Swimming Association
Kyrgyzstan	KGZ		Kyrgyz Republic Swimming Federation
Laos	LAO		Lao Swimming Federation
Lebanon	LBN		Lebanese Swimming Federation
Macau	MAC		Macao General Swimming Association
Malaysia	MAS		Amateur Swimming Union of Malaysia
Maldives	MDV		Swimming Association of Maldives
Mongolia	MGL		Mongolian Amateur Swimming Federation
Myanmar	MYA		Myanmar Swimming Federation
Nepal	NEP		Nepal Swimming Association
Oman	OMA		Oman Swimming Association
Pakistan	PAK		Pakistan Swimming Federation
Palestine	PLE		Palestinian Swimming Federation and Aquatic Sports
Country	FINA code	Overview	National association
Philippines	PHI		Philippine Swimming
Qatar	QAT		Qatar Swimming Association
Saudi Arabia	KSA		Saudi Arabian Swimming Federation
Singapore	SGP		Singapore Swimming Association
Sri Lanka	SRI		Sri Lanka Aquatic Sports Union
Syria	SYR		Syrian Arab Swimming and Aquatic Sports Federation
Chinese Taipei	TPE		Chinese Taipei Swimming Association
Tajikistan	TJK		Swimming Federation of Tajikistan
Thailand	THA		Thailand Swimming Association
Timor-Leste	TLS		National Swimming Federation of Timor Leste
Turkmenistan	TKM		Water Sports Federation of Turkmenistan
United Arab Emirates	UAE		UAE Swimming Association
Uzbekistan	UZB		Uzbekistan Swimming Federation
Vietnam	VIE		Vietnam Aquatic Sports Association
Yemen	YEM		Yemen Swimming and Aquatics Federation
Country	FINA code	Overview	National association

==== Competitions and teams ====
Legend

- NT – National water polo teams that competed at the Summer Olympics
- NT – National water polo teams that were Olympic champions
- NT – National water polo teams that finished in their best ever position of second at the Summer Olympics
- NT – National water polo teams that finished in their best ever position of third at the Summer Olympics
- NT – National water polo teams that finished in their best ever position of fourth at the Summer Olympics
- Host – Hosts of the Summer Olympics

Country	National teams		List of Clubs	Men's competitions		Women's competitions		International competitions hosted
Country	Men's	Women's	List of Clubs	Top division	Domestic cup	Top division	Domestic cup	International competitions hosted
Afghanistan								
Bahrain								
Bangladesh								
Bhutan								
Brunei								
Cambodia								
China	Men's NT	Women's NT						Host
Hong Kong								
India	Men's NT							Host
Indonesia								Host
Iran	Men's NT							Host
Iraq								
Japan	Men's NT	Women's NT						Host
Jordan								
Kazakhstan	Men's NT	Women's NT	Clubs					Host
Country	National teams		List of Clubs	Men's competitions		Women's competitions		International competitions hosted
Country	Men's	Women's	List of Clubs	Top division	Domestic cup	Top division	Domestic cup	International competitions hosted
North Korea								
South Korea	Men's NT	Women's NT						Host
Kuwait								
Kyrgyzstan								
Laos								
Lebanon								
Macau								
Malaysia								
Maldives								
Mongolia								
Myanmar								
Nepal								
Oman								
Pakistan								
Palestine								
Country	National teams		List of Clubs	Men's competitions		Women's competitions		International competitions hosted
Country	Men's	Women's	List of Clubs	Top division	Domestic cup	Top division	Domestic cup	International competitions hosted
Philippines	Men's NT	Women's NT						Host
Qatar								Host
Saudi Arabia								
Singapore	Men's NT							
Sri Lanka								
Syria								Host
Chinese Taipei								
Tajikistan								
Thailand								Host
Timor-Leste								
Turkmenistan								
United Arab Emirates								Host
Uzbekistan								
Vietnam								
Yemen								
Country	Men's	Women's	List of Clubs	Top division	Domestic cup	Top division	Domestic cup	International competitions hosted
Country	National teams		List of Clubs	Men's competitions		Women's competitions		International competitions hosted

== Europe ==
Continent	Governing body	FINA members	Main men's competition(s)		Main women's competition(s)	
Continent	Governing body	FINA members	National	Club	National	Club
Europe	European Swimming League (LEN)	52	European Championship	Champions League	European Championship	Euro League Women
Europe	European Swimming League (LEN)	52	Europa Cup	Euro Cup	Europa Cup	LEN Trophy
Europe	European Swimming League (LEN)	52	—N/a	Super Cup	—N/a	Women's Super Cup

=== By sub-region ===
Sub-region	Main men's competition(s)		Main women's competition(s)	
Sub-region	National	Club	National	Club
Adriatic	—N/a	Adriatic League (teams from Croatia, Montenegro, and Slovenia)	—N/a	—N/a
Nordics	—N/a	Nordic League (teams from Finland, Lithuania, Poland, Sweden, Denmark, Slovakia and Czech Republic)	—N/a	—N/a

=== By country ===
==== National associations ====
Notes:

- The national association below is a member of the Asia Swimming Federation (AASF):
  - Swimming Federation of the Republic of Kazakhstan

Country	FINA code	Overview	National association
Albania	ALB		Albanian Swimming Federation
Andorra	AND		Andorran Swimming Federation
Armenia	ARM		Armenian Swimming Federation
Austria	AUT		Austrian Swimming Federation
Azerbaijan	AZE		Swimming Federation of Azerbaijan
Belarus	BLR		Swimming Federation of Belarus
Belgium	BEL		Royal Belgian Swimming Federation
Bosnia and Herzegovina	BIH		Swimming Association of Bosnia and Herzegovina
Bulgaria	BUL		Bulgarian Water Polo Federation
Croatia	CRO		Croatian Water Polo Federation
Cyprus	CYP		Cyprus Swimming Federation
Czech Republic	CZE		Czech Swimming Federation
Denmark	DEN		Danish Swimming Union
Country	FINA code	Overview	National association
Estonia	EST		Estonian Swimming Federation
Faroe Islands	FAR		Swimming Federation of the Faroe Islands
Finland	FIN		Finnish Swimming Federation
France	FRA		French Swimming Federation
Georgia	GEO		Georgian Aquatic Sports Federation
Germany	GER		German Swimming Federation
Gibraltar	GIB		Gibraltar Amateur Swimming Association
Greece	GRE		Hellenic Swimming Federation
Hungary	HUN		Hungarian Water Polo Federation
Iceland	ISL		Icelandic Swimming Association
Ireland	IRL		Swim Ireland
Israel	ISR		Israel Swimming Association
Italy	ITA		Italian Swimming Federation
Country	FINA code	Overview	National association
Kosovo	KOS		Kosovo Swimming Federation
Latvia	LAT		Latvian Swimming Federation
Liechtenstein	LIE		Swimming Association of Liechtenstein
Lithuania	LTU		Lithuanian Swimming Federation
Luxembourg	LUX		Luxembourg Swimming and Life-saving Federation
North Macedonia	MKD		Swimming Federation of North Macedonia
Malta	MLT	Water polo in Malta	Aquatic Sports Association of Malta
Moldova	MDA		Moldovan Swimming Federation
Monaco	MON		Swimming Federation of Monaco
Montenegro	MNE		Water Polo and Swimming Federation of Montenegro
Netherlands	NED		Royal Dutch Swimming Federation
Norway	NOR		Norwegian Swimming Federation
Poland	POL		Polish Swimming Federation
Country	FINA code	Overview	National association
Portugal	POR		Portuguese Swimming Federation
Romania	ROU		Romanian Water Polo Federation
Russia	RUS		Russian Water Polo Federation
San Marino	SMR		Swimming Federation of San Marino
Serbia	SRB		Water Polo Association of Serbia
Slovakia	SVK		Slovak Water Polo Union
Slovenia	SLO		Zveza vaterpolskih društev Slovenije
Spain	ESP	Water polo in Spain	Royal Spanish Swimming Federation
Sweden	SWE		Swedish Swimming Federation
Switzerland	SUI		Swiss Swimming Federation
Turkey	TUR		Türkiye Sutopu Federasyonu
Ukraine	UKR		Ukrainian Swimming Federa
United Kingdom	GBR		British Swimming
Country	FINA code	Overview	National association

Former country	FINA code	Overview	National association
Czechoslovakia	TCH		
East Germany	GDR		Fédération Royale Belge de Natation
West Germany	FRG		
Serbia and Montenegro	SCG		Water Polo Association of Serbia and Montenegro
Soviet Union	URS		Федерация водного поло СССР
Yugoslavia	YUG		Vaterpolo savez Jugoslavije

==== Competitions and teams ====
Legend

- NT – National water polo teams that competed at the Summer Olympics
- NT – National water polo teams that were Olympic champions
- NT – National water polo teams that finished in their best ever position of second at the Summer Olympics
- NT – National water polo teams that finished in their best ever position of third at the Summer Olympics
- NT – National water polo teams that finished in their best ever position of fourth at the Summer Olympics
- Host – Hosts of the Summer Olympics

Country	National teams		List of Clubs	Men's competitions		Women's competitions		International competitions hosted
Country	Men's	Women's	List of Clubs	Top division	Domestic cup	Top division	Domestic cup	International competitions hosted
Albania								
Andorra								
Armenia								
Austria	Men's NT			Österreichische Wasserball Liga				Host
Azerbaijan								Host
Belarus								
Belgium	Men's NT	Women's NT						Host
Bosnia and Herzegovina	Men's NT		Clubs	Bosnia and Herzegovina League				
Bulgaria	Men's NT							Host
Croatia	Men's NT	Women's NT	Clubs	Croatian First League	Croatian Cup			Host
Cyprus								
Czech Republic				Czech First League				
Denmark								
Country	National teams		List of Clubs	Men's competitions		Women's competitions		International competitions hosted
Country	Men's	Women's	List of Clubs	Top division	Domestic cup	Top division	Domestic cup	International competitions hosted
Estonia								
Faroe Islands								
Finland				Finnish League				Host
France	Men's NT	Women's NT	Clubs	Championnat de France		Championnat de France (women's)		Host
Georgia	Men's NT							
Germany	Men's NT	Women's NT	Clubs	Deutsche Wasserball-Liga		Deutsche Wasserball-Liga		Host
Gibraltar								
Greece	Men's NT	Women's NT	Clubs	A1 Ethniki	Greek Cup	A1 Ethniki Women	Greek Women's Cup	Host
Hungary	Men's NT	Women's NT	Clubs	Országos Bajnokság I	Magyar Kupa	Országos Bajnokság I (women's)	Magyar Kupa (women's)	Host
Iceland	Men's NT							
Ireland	Men's NT			National Division 1				
Israel	Men's NT	Women's NT						
Italy	Men's NT	Women's NT	Clubs	Serie A1	Coppa Italia	Serie A1 (women's)		Host
Country	National teams		List of Clubs	Men's competitions		Women's competitions		International competitions hosted
Country	Men's	Women's	List of Clubs	Top division	Domestic cup	Top division	Domestic cup	International competitions hosted
Kosovo								
Latvia	Men's NT							
Liechtenstein								
Lithuania	Men's NT							
Luxembourg	Men's NT							
North Macedonia	Men's NT							
Malta	Men's NT		Clubs	Maltese Premier League				
Moldova								
Monaco								
Montenegro	Men's NT		Clubs	Montenegrin First League	Montenegrin Cup			Host
Netherlands	Men's NT	Women's NT	Clubs	Dutch Championship		Dutch Women's Championship		Host
Norway			Clubs					
Poland				Polish Championship				
Country	National teams		List of Clubs	Men's competitions		Women's competitions		International competitions hosted
Country	Men's	Women's	List of Clubs	Top division	Domestic cup	Top division	Domestic cup	International competitions hosted
Portugal	Men's NT			Portuguese League				
Romania	Men's NT		Clubs	Romanian Superliga				Host
Russia	Men's NT	Women's NT	Clubs	Russian Championship		Russian Women's Championship		Host
San Marino								
Serbia	Men's NT	Women's NT	Clubs	Serbian League A	Serbian Cup			Host
Slovakia	Men's NT	Women's NT		Extraliga				
Slovenia	Men's NT		Clubs	Slovenian First League				Host
Spain	Men's NT	Women's NT	Clubs	División de Honor	Copa del Rey	División de Honor Femenina	Copa de la Reina	Host
Sweden	Men's NT		Clubs	Elitserien				Host
Switzerland	Men's NT							
Turkey	Men's NT	Women's NT	Clubs	Turkish League				Host
Ukraine	Men's NT							
United Kingdom	Men's NT	Women's NT	Clubs	British League				Host
Country	Men's	Women's	List of Clubs	Top division	Domestic cup	Top division	Domestic cup	International competitions hosted
Country	National teams		List of Clubs	Men's competitions		Women's competitions		International competitions hosted

Former country	National teams		List of Clubs	Men's competitions		Women's competitions		International competitions hosted
Former country	Men's	Women's	List of Clubs	Top division	Domestic cup	Top division	Domestic cup	International competitions hosted
Czechoslovakia	Men's NT							
East Germany	Men's NT							
West Germany	Men's NT							Host
Serbia and Montenegro	Men's NT		Clubs	Serbia and Montenegro Championship				Host
Soviet Union	Men's NT		Clubs	Soviet Championship				Host
Yugoslavia	Men's NT		Clubs	Yugoslav Championship				Host

== Oceania ==
Continent	Governing body	FINA members	Main men's competition(s)		Main women's competition(s)	
Continent	Governing body	FINA members	National	Club	National	Club
Oceania	Oceania Swimming Association (OSA)	15	—N/a	—N/a	—N/a	—N/a

=== By country ===
==== National associations ====
Country	FINA code	Overview	National association
American Samoa	ASA		American Samoa Swimming Association
Australia	AUS	Water polo in Australia	Water Polo Australia
Cook Islands	COK		Cook Islands Aquatics Federation
Fiji	FIJ		Fiji Swimming
Guam	GUM		Guam Swimming Federation
Marshall Islands	MHL		Marshall Islands Swimming Federation
Federated States of Micronesia	FSM		Federated States of Micronesia Swimming Association
New Zealand	NZL		New Zealand Water Polo
Northern Mariana Islands	NMA		Northern Mariana Islands Swimming Federation
Palau	PLW		Palau Swimming Association
Papua New Guinea	PNG		Papua New Guinea Swimming
Samoa	SAM		Samoa Swimming Federation
Solomon Islands	SOL		Solomon Islands Swimming Federation
Tonga	TGA		Tonga Swimming Association
Vanuatu	VAN		Vanuatu Aquatics Federation
Country	FINA code	Overview	National association

==== Competitions and teams ====
Legend

- NT – National water polo teams that competed at the Summer Olympics
- NT – National water polo teams that were Olympic champions
- NT – National water polo teams that finished in their best ever position of second at the Summer Olympics
- NT – National water polo teams that finished in their best ever position of third at the Summer Olympics
- NT – National water polo teams that finished in their best ever position of fourth at the Summer Olympics
- Host – Hosts of the Summer Olympics

Country	National teams		List of Clubs	Men's competitions		Women's competitions		International competitions hosted
Country	Men's	Women's	List of Clubs	Top division	Domestic cup	Top division	Domestic cup	International competitions hosted
American Samoa								
Australia	Men's NT	Women's NT	Clubs	Australian League		Australian League (women's)		Host
Cook Islands								
Fiji								
Guam								
Marshall Islands								
Federated States of Micronesia								
New Zealand	Men's NT	Women's NT		New Zealand League		New Zealand League (women's)		Host
Northern Mariana Islands								
Palau								
Papua New Guinea								
Samoa								
Solomon Islands								
Tonga								
Vanuatu								
Country	Men's	Women's	List of Clubs	Top division	Domestic cup	Top division	Domestic cup	International competitions hosted
Country	National teams		List of Clubs	Men's competitions		Women's competitions		International competitions hosted

== See also ==
- List of FINA member federations
