= FINA Water Polo Challengers' Cup =

International water polo tournament

- Most recent season or competition: 2021 FINA Water Polo Challengers' Cup
- Formerly: FINA World Water Polo Development Trophy
- Sport: Water polo
- Founded: 2007
- No. of teams: 4 (2021)
- Confederation: FINA (Worldwide)
- Most recent champion: Colombia (2nd title)
- Website: fina.org

The FINA Water Polo Challengers' Cup is an international water polo tournament, organized by FINA. Intended for developing national water polo teams, the biennial tournament was first organized as the FINA World Water Polo Development Trophy in 2007. The tournament is known as the FINA Water Polo Challengers' Cup since the 2019 edition.

== Summary ==
Year	Host	Final			Third-place game		
Year	Host	Champion	Score	Second Place	Third Place	Score	Fourth Place
2007	Kuwait City	Colombia	16–4	Puerto Rico	Iran	9–5	Kuwait
2009	Kuwait City	Kuwait	13–6	Singapore	Trinidad and Tobago	8–7	Philippines
2011	(Saudi Arabia); Dammam	Saudi Arabia	7–6	Iran	Kuwait	13–5	Chile
2013	Kuwait City	Uzbekistan	8–5	Egypt	Saudi Arabia	10–8	Puerto Rico
2015	(Iran); Tehran	Iran	13–5	Uruguay	Austria	9–7	Malta
2017	(Malta); Gżira	Uruguay	awd	Saudi Arabia	Austria	awd	Tunisia
2019	Singapore	Singapore	8–5	Austria	Indonesia	14–9	Ireland
2021	(Colombia); Barranquilla	Colombia	13–4	Puerto Rico	Kuwait	11–7	Venezuela

== Medal table ==
Rank	Nation	Gold	Silver	Bronze	Total
1	Colombia	2	0	0	2
2	Iran	1	1	1	3
2	Saudi Arabia	1	1	1	3
4	Singapore	1	1	0	2
4	Uruguay	1	1	0	2
6	Kuwait	1	0	2	3
7	Uzbekistan	1	0	0	1
8	Puerto Rico	0	2	0	2
9	Austria	0	1	2	3
10	Egypt	0	1	0	1
11	Indonesia	0	0	1	1
11	Trinidad and Tobago	0	0	1	1
Totals (12 entries)		8	8	8	24

== Participating nations ==
Team	(Kuwait) 2007	(Kuwait) 2009	(Saudi Arabia) 2011	(Kuwait) 2013	(Iran) 2015	(Malta) 2017	(Singapore) 2019	(Colombia) 2021	Years
Algeria	9th	6th	11th						3
Austria					3rd	3rd	2nd		3
Azerbaijan					5th				1
Chile	8th		4th						2
Chinese Taipei							10th		1
Colombia	1st							1st	2
Egypt				2nd					1
Guatemala		10th		10th	9th				3
Hong Kong							6th		1
Indonesia		8th			6th		3rd		3
India							7th		1
Iran	3rd		2nd		1st	DQ			4
Ireland							4th		1
Jamaica		9th							1
Kenya	12th	12th							2
Kuwait	4th	1st	3rd	5th	7th			3rd	5
Malta					4th	DQ			2
Malaysia							8th		1
Morocco	11th	5th	10th		10th				4
Netherlands Antilles			9th						1
Peru			8th	11th		5th			3
Philippines		4th					5th		2
Puerto Rico	2nd			4th				2nd	2
Saudi Arabia	5th		1st	3rd		2nd			4
Singapore		2nd	6th	9th		6th	1st		5
South Africa				7th					1
South Korea	7th								1
Trinidad and Tobago		3rd	5th						2
Tunisia	10th	11th	7th	8th	8th	4th			6
Uruguay	6th	7th		6th	2nd	1st			5
Uzbekistan				1st					1
Venezuela								4th	1
Zimbabwe							9th		1
Total	12	12	11	11	10	8	10	4	
