= 2015 FINA World Water Polo Development Trophy =

The 5th edition of the Men's FINA World Water Polo Development Trophy was held in Tehran, Iran from May 24 to May 29, 2015.

== Format ==
10 teams qualified for the 2015 FINA World Water Polo Development Trophy. They were split into two groups of 4 teams. After playing a Round-robin, the best ranked team of Group A plays against the best ranked team of Group B for the title, the second ranked team of Group A against the second ranked team of Group B for the 3rd place. The third ranked team of Group A against the third ranked team of Group B for the 5th place, the fourth ranked team of Group A against the fourth ranked team of Group B for the 7th place, and finally, the fifth ranked team of Group A against the fifth ranked team of Group B for the 9th and 10th place respectively.

== Groups ==
Group A	Group B
Azerbaijan; Kuwait; Morocco; Malta; Uruguay	Iran; Austria; Guatemala; Indonesia; Tunisia

== Preliminary round ==
=== Group A ===
	Team	G	W	D	L	GF	GA	Diff	Points
1.	Uruguay	4	4	0	0	48	30	+18	8
2.	Malta	4	3	0	1	49	28	+21	6
3.	Azerbaijan	4	2	0	2	43	38	+5	4
4.	Kuwait	4	1	0	3	40	33	+7	2
5.	Morocco	4	0	0	4	19	70	-51	0

=== Group B ===
	Team	G	W	D	L	GF	GA	Diff	Points
1.	Iran	4	4	0	0	69	21	+48	8
2.	Austria	4	3	0	1	56	30	+26	6
3.	Indonesia	4	2	0	2	46	41	+5	4
4.	Tunisia	4	1	0	3	36	51	-15	2
5.	Guatemala	4	0	0	4	11	75	-64	0

== Knockout stage ==
=== 9th place game ===
29 May 2015	Guatemala	8–7	Morocco	Tehran’s Shiroudi Stadium, Tehran

=== 7th place game ===
29 May 2015	Kuwait	10–7	Tunisia	Tehran’s Shiroudi Stadium, Tehran

=== 5th place game ===
29 May 2015	Azerbaijan	10–8	Indonesia	Tehran’s Shiroudi Stadium, Tehran

=== 3rd place game ===
29 May 2015	Malta	7–9	Austria	Tehran’s Shiroudi Stadium, Tehran

=== Final ===
29 May 2015	Iran	13–5	Uruguay	Tehran’s Shiroudi Stadium, Tehran

== Final standings ==
Rank	Team
	Iran
	Uruguay
	Austria
4.	Malta
5.	Azerbaijan
6.	Indonesia
7.	Kuwait
8.	Tunisia
9.	Guatemala
10.	Morocco
