= 2017 FINA World Water Polo Development Trophy =

2017 FINA Water Polo Development Trophy
Tournament information
- Sport: Water polo
- Location: Tal-Qroqq Sports Complex, Gżira
- Dates: 17 October 2017–22 October 2017
- Host(s): Malta
- Venue(s): 1
- Teams: 8

Final positions
- Champions: Uruguay (1st title)
- 1st runners-up: Saudi Arabia
- 2nd runners-up: Austria

Tournament statistics
- Top scorer(s): (Peru) Diego Villar (19 goals)

The 2017 FINA World Water Polo Development Trophy was the 6th edition of the tournament organized by FINA and reserved for national teams from emerging countries in the world of water polo. It ran from 17 to 22 October 2017 at the Tal-Qroqq Sports Complex in Gżira, Malta; eight teams from four continental confederations participated at the competition.

Uruguay won the 3rd place match, but was later awarded the Trophy due to the disqualification of both Malta and Iran during the gold-medal final.

== Teams ==
CANA Africa	UANA Americas	AASF Asia	LEN Europe
Tunisia	Peru; Uruguay	Iran; Saudi Arabia; Singapore	Austria; Malta

=== Groups ===
Group A	Group B
Iran; Malta; Tunisia; Uruguay	Austria; Peru; Singapore; Saudi Arabia

== Preliminary round ==
=== Group A ===
Pos	Team	Pld	W	D	L	GF	GA	GD	Pts	Qualification	(Iran)	(Malta)	(Uruguay)	(Tunisia)
1	Iran	3	3	0	0	37	24	+13	6	Quarterfinals	—			10–8
2	Malta	3	2	0	1	41	30	+11	4	Quarterfinals	8–12	—		19–9
3	Uruguay	3	1	0	2	31	31	0	2	Quarterfinals	8–15	9–14	—	
4	Tunisia	3	0	0	3	26	36	−10	0	Quarterfinals			7–9	—

Source: FINA

=== Group B ===
Pos	Team	Pld	W	D	L	GF	GA	GD	Pts	Qualification	(Saudi Arabia)	(Austria)	(Peru)	(Singapore)
1	Saudi Arabia	3	3	0	0	31	17	+14	6	Quarterfinals	—	12–4		
2	Austria	3	1	0	2	19	26	−7	2	Quarterfinals		—	7–5	
3	Peru	3	1	0	2	28	28	0	2	Quarterfinals	8–9		—	15–12
4	Singapore	3	1	0	2	29	30	−1	2	Quarterfinals	5–10	9–8		—

Source: FINA

== Knockout stage ==
All times are local (UTC+2; CEST)

=== Bracket ===
Quarterfinals
Iran	10
Singapore	4
Austria	3
Uruguay	9
Saudi Arabia	10
Tunisia	9
Malta	21
Peru	6

Semifinals
Iran	15
Uruguay	7
Saudi Arabia	7
Malta	18

Final
Iran	DQ
Malta	DQ
3rd place match
Uruguay	11
Saudi Arabia	5

5th place bracket

5–8th place classification
Singapore	8
Austria	9
Tunisia	8
Peru	6

5th place match
Austria (pso)	13 (10)
Tunisia	12 (10)
7th place match
Singapore	11 (8)
Peru (pso)	13 (8)

=== Quarterfinals ===
20 October 2017; 15:30	Report	Austria	3–9	Uruguay	Tal-Qroqq Sports Complex (Gżira); Referees: Zwart (NED), Balzan (MLT)
20 October 2017; 15:30	Report	Score by quarters: 1—2, 0—3, 0—1, 1—3			Tal-Qroqq Sports Complex (Gżira); Referees: Zwart (NED), Balzan (MLT)
20 October 2017; 15:30	Report	1: Celebic, Lang, Gratzl	Goals	3: García, Brugnini; 2: San Martín	Tal-Qroqq Sports Complex (Gżira); Referees: Zwart (NED), Balzan (MLT)

20 October 2017; 16:50	Report	Iran	10–4	Singapore	Tal-Qroqq Sports Complex (Gżira); Referees: Montagne (URU), Al-Jabri (KSA)
20 October 2017; 16:50	Report	Score by quarters: 2—1, 2—0, 4—1, 2—2			Tal-Qroqq Sports Complex (Gżira); Referees: Montagne (URU), Al-Jabri (KSA)
20 October 2017; 16:50	Report	4: Almasi; 2: Yazdankhah	Goals	2: Chiam, Zhen Wei	Tal-Qroqq Sports Complex (Gżira); Referees: Montagne (URU), Al-Jabri (KSA)

20 October 2017; 18:10	Report	Saudi Arabia	10–9	Tunisia	Tal-Qroqq Sports Complex (Gżira); Referees: Korolev (AUT), Guerra (PER)
20 October 2017; 18:10	Report	Score by quarters: 4—3, 3—1, 2—2, 1—3			Tal-Qroqq Sports Complex (Gżira); Referees: Korolev (AUT), Guerra (PER)
20 October 2017; 18:10	Report	2: Al-Aryani, Al-Daughter	Goals	4: Chouikha; 2: Ghomrasni, Ben Hajkhlifa	Tal-Qroqq Sports Complex (Gżira); Referees: Korolev (AUT), Guerra (PER)

20 October 2017; 19:30	Report	Malta	21–6	Peru	Tal-Qroqq Sports Complex (Gżira); Referees: Spiegel (GER), Cheng (SGP)
20 October 2017; 19:30	Report	Score by quarters: 5—1, 5—2, 5—1, 6—2			Tal-Qroqq Sports Complex (Gżira); Referees: Spiegel (GER), Cheng (SGP)
20 October 2017; 19:30	Report	10: S. Camilleri; 3: D. Zammit	Goals	2: Pastor, N. Villar, D. Villar	Tal-Qroqq Sports Complex (Gżira); Referees: Spiegel (GER), Cheng (SGP)

=== Semifinals ===
21 October 2017; 18:10	Report	Iran	15–7	Uruguay	Tal-Qroqq Sports Complex (Gżira); Referees: Spiegel (GER), Korolev (AUT)
21 October 2017; 18:10	Report	Score by quarters: 2—3, 4—0, 5—3, 4—1			Tal-Qroqq Sports Complex (Gżira); Referees: Spiegel (GER), Korolev (AUT)
21 October 2017; 18:10	Report	3: Keyhani, Almasi; 2:Khanbanan, Yazdankhah	Goals	4: San Martín; 2: García	Tal-Qroqq Sports Complex (Gżira); Referees: Spiegel (GER), Korolev (AUT)

21 October 2017; 19:30	Report	Saudi Arabia	7–18	Malta	Tal-Qroqq Sports Complex (Gżira); Referees: Zwart (NED), Cheng (SGP)
21 October 2017; 19:30	Report	Score by quarters: 2—4, 1—4, 2—4, 2—6			Tal-Qroqq Sports Complex (Gżira); Referees: Zwart (NED), Cheng (SGP)
21 October 2017; 19:30	Report	3: Gamal; 2: Al-Aryani	Goals	4: J.Camilleri, D. Zammit; 3: Cousin	Tal-Qroqq Sports Complex (Gżira); Referees: Zwart (NED), Cheng (SGP)

==== 5th to 8th place ====
21 October 2017; 15:30	Report	Tunisia	8–6	Peru	Tal-Qroqq Sports Complex (Gżira); Referees: Balzan (MLT), Montagne (URU)
21 October 2017; 15:30	Report	Score by quarters: 2—1, 3—3, 2—1, 1—1			Tal-Qroqq Sports Complex (Gżira); Referees: Balzan (MLT), Montagne (URU)
21 October 2017; 15:30	Report	3: Ghomrasni, Ben Hajkhlifa	Goals	2: Grandez, Morales	Tal-Qroqq Sports Complex (Gżira); Referees: Balzan (MLT), Montagne (URU)

21 October 2017; 16:50	Report	Singapore	8–9	Austria	Tal-Qroqq Sports Complex (Gżira); Referees: Al-Jabry (KSA), Jenhani (TUN)
21 October 2017; 16:50	Report	Score by quarters: 1—1, 2—3, 3—2, 2—3			Tal-Qroqq Sports Complex (Gżira); Referees: Al-Jabry (KSA), Jenhani (TUN)
21 October 2017; 16:50	Report	3:Wei Loong; 2: Chiam	Goals	Vidović, Ribić, Gratzl	Tal-Qroqq Sports Complex (Gżira); Referees: Al-Jabry (KSA), Jenhani (TUN)

=== Finals ===
==== 7th place ====
22 October 2017; 09:30	Report	Singapore	11–13 (PSO) (PSO)	Peru	Tal-Qroqq Sports Complex (Gżira); Referees: Jenhani (TUN), Al-Jabry (KSA)
22 October 2017; 09:30	Report	Score by quarters: 3—2, 3—3, 2—1, 0—2 PSO: 3—5			Tal-Qroqq Sports Complex (Gżira); Referees: Jenhani (TUN), Al-Jabry (KSA)
22 October 2017; 09:30	Report	2: Chow, Wei Loong, Zhen Wei	Goals	3: D. Villar	Tal-Qroqq Sports Complex (Gżira); Referees: Jenhani (TUN), Al-Jabry (KSA)

==== 5th place ====
22 October 2017; 10:50	Report	Austria	13–12 (PSO) (PSO)	Tunisia	Tal-Qroqq Sports Complex (Gżira); Referees: Cheng (SGP), Guerra (PER)
22 October 2017; 10:50	Report	Score by quarters: 2—3, 1—1, 3—2, 4—4 PSO: 3—2			Tal-Qroqq Sports Complex (Gżira); Referees: Cheng (SGP), Guerra (PER)
22 October 2017; 10:50	Report	3: Gratzl; 2: Celebic, Todorović	Goals	4: Ghomrasni, Chouikha	Tal-Qroqq Sports Complex (Gżira); Referees: Cheng (SGP), Guerra (PER)

==== 3rd place ====
22 October 2017; 12:10	Report	Uruguay	11–5	Saudi Arabia	Tal-Qroqq Sports Complex (Gżira); Referees: Balzan (MLT), Korolev (AUT)
22 October 2017; 12:10	Report	Score by quarters: 4—1, 1—1, 2—2, 4—1			Tal-Qroqq Sports Complex (Gżira); Referees: Balzan (MLT), Korolev (AUT)
22 October 2017; 12:10	Report	4: Brugnini; 2: García, San Martín	Goals	2: Olayan	Tal-Qroqq Sports Complex (Gżira); Referees: Balzan (MLT), Korolev (AUT)

==== Gold-medal match ====
The final match of the competition between Malta and Iran was abandoned with 33 seconds in the match, with the host team leading 8–6.

The referees had excluded two Maltese and five Iranian players because of a series of altercations erupted after Malta scored the last goal, but the verbal fights increased between the players who were already outside the pool. Although there was no physical violence involved, all of the remaining players in the game rushed out of the water to support their teammates.

The referees decided to cancel the game and refer the incidents to the FINA technical committee under the relevant disciplinary rules. Both finalists were disqualified, thus awarding the Trophy to Uruguay, winner of the 3rd place final.

== Awards ==
2017 FINA World Water Polo Development Trophy

Uruguay
1st title

- Top Scorer: (Peru) Diego Villar (19 goals)
- Most Valuable Player: (Uruguay) Santiago San Martín
- Best Goalkeeper: (Uruguay) Alfonso Rodríguez

== Final standings ==
Rank	Team
1st place, gold medalist(s)	Uruguay
2nd place, silver medalist(s)	Saudi Arabia
3rd place, bronze medalist(s)	Austria
4	Tunisia
5	Peru
6	Singapore
DQ	Iran
DQ	Malta
