= 2019 FINA Water Polo Challengers' Cup =

Tournament information
- Sport: Water polo
- Location: OCBC Aquatic Centre
- Dates: 8–13 October
- Host: Singapore
- Venue: 1
- Teams: 10

Final positions
- Champions: Singapore
- 1st runners-up: Austria
- 2nd runners-up: Indonesia

Tournament statistics
- Matches played: 15
- Goals scored: 667 (44.47 per match)
- MVP: An Jun Ang
- Top scorer: Ridjkie Mulia (37 goals)

The 2019 FINA Water Polo Challengers' Cup is an international water polo tournament held at the OCBC Aquatic Centre in Singapore from 8 to 13 October 2019. It is the seventh edition of the tournament which was known as the FINA World Water Polo Development Trophy until the 2017 edition. The tournament was hosted by the Singapore Swimming Association. Ten nations participated in the Challengers' Cup.

Singapore won over Austria in the final, with the host surpassing their second-place finish in 2009.

== Groups ==
Group A	Group B
Ireland; Malaysia; Philippines; Singapore; Zimbabwe	Austria; India; Chinese Taipei; Hong Kong; Indonesia

== Preliminary round ==
=== Group A ===
Pos	Team	Pld	W	D	L	GF	GA	GD	Pts	Qualification	Singapore	Ireland	Philippines	Malaysia	Zimbabwe
1	Singapore (H)	4	4	0	0	68	25	+43	8	Gold medal match	—			20–5	26–5
2	Ireland	4	3	0	1	52	32	+20	6	Bronze medal match	8–11	—	12–8		
3	Philippines	4	2	0	2	44	33	+11	4	5th−6th place	7–11		—	11–8	
4	Malaysia	4	1	0	3	41	54	−13	2	7th−8th place		7–15		—	21–8
5	Zimbabwe	4	0	0	4	21	82	−61	0	9th−10th place		6–17	2–18		—

Source: FINA
(H) Hosts

=== Group B ===
Pos	Team	Pld	W	D	L	GF	GA	GD	Pts	Qualification	Austria	Indonesia	Hong Kong	India	Chinese Taipei for Olympic games
1	Austria	4	4	0	0	79	27	+52	8	Gold medal match	—		19–6		32–5
2	Indonesia	4	3	0	1	78	43	+35	6	Bronze medal match	9–11	—	15–7		
3	Hong Kong	4	2	0	2	70	61	+9	4	5th−6th place			—	17–13	30–14
4	India	4	1	0	3	63	63	0	2	7th−8th place	7–17	10–23		—	
5	Chinese Taipei	4	0	0	4	40	126	−86	0	9th−10th place		15–31		6–33	—

Source: FINA

== Finals ==
=== 9th place game ===
13 October 2019; 10:00	Report	Zimbabwe	30–3	Chinese Taipei	OCBC Aquatic Centre, Singapore; Referees: Naumov (RUS), Wee (MAS)
13 October 2019; 10:00	Report	Score by quarters: 6–0, 7–1, 8–1, 9–1			OCBC Aquatic Centre, Singapore; Referees: Naumov (RUS), Wee (MAS)
13 October 2019; 10:00	Report	5: Kloppers, Buchanan; 4: Fargnoli, Bradwell	Goals	3: Yu	OCBC Aquatic Centre, Singapore; Referees: Naumov (RUS), Wee (MAS)

=== 7th place game ===
13 October 2019; 11:30	Report	Malaysia	8–13	India	OCBC Aquatic Centre, Singapore; Referees: Dilapdilap (PHI), Davison (ZIM)
13 October 2019; 11:30	Report	Score by quarters: 4–5, 0–2, 3–2, 1–4			OCBC Aquatic Centre, Singapore; Referees: Dilapdilap (PHI), Davison (ZIM)
13 October 2019; 11:30	Report	4: Yi X. 2: Yi T.	Goals	3: Ashwinikumar; 2: Sibin, Anathu, Uday, Praveen	OCBC Aquatic Centre, Singapore; Referees: Dilapdilap (PHI), Davison (ZIM)

=== 5th place game ===
13 October 2019; 15:00	Report	Philippines	13–8	Hong Kong	OCBC Aquatic Centre, Singapore; Referees: Kum (SGP), O'Brien (IRL)
13 October 2019; 15:00	Report	Score by quarters: 4–2, 3–1, 5–4, 1–1			OCBC Aquatic Centre, Singapore; Referees: Kum (SGP), O'Brien (IRL)
13 October 2019; 15:00	Report	5: Valdez; 4: Serrano	Goals	4: Choi; 2: Kong	OCBC Aquatic Centre, Singapore; Referees: Kum (SGP), O'Brien (IRL)

=== 3rd place game ===
13 October 2019; 16:30	Report	Ireland	9–14	Indonesia	OCBC Aquatic Centre, Singapore; Referees: Peila (USA), Kovac (AUT)
13 October 2019; 16:30	Report	Score by quarters: 3–4, 1–4, 3–4, 2–2			OCBC Aquatic Centre, Singapore; Referees: Peila (USA), Kovac (AUT)
13 October 2019; 16:30	Report	3: Nolan; 2: McMahon, Bridgmont	Goals	6: Mulia; 3: Budiman	OCBC Aquatic Centre, Singapore; Referees: Peila (USA), Kovac (AUT)

=== Gold medal match ===
13 October 2019; 18:00	Report	Singapore	8–5	Austria	OCBC Aquatic Centre, Singapore; Referees: Naumov (RUS), Shinde (IND)
13 October 2019; 18:00	Report	Score by quarters: 3–0, 3–2, 1–1, 1–2			OCBC Aquatic Centre, Singapore; Referees: Naumov (RUS), Shinde (IND)
13 October 2019; 18:00	Report	3: Cheng-Kang Lee	Goals	2: Vondrak	OCBC Aquatic Centre, Singapore; Referees: Naumov (RUS), Shinde (IND)

== Awards ==
2019 FINA Water Polo Challengers' Cup

Singapore
1st title

- Most Valuable Player: (Singapore) An Jun Ang
- Most Valuable Goalkeeper: (Austria) Salkan Samardzic
- Highest Goal-Scorer: (Indonesia) Ridjkie Mulia (37 goals)

== Final standings ==
Rank	Team
1st place, gold medalist(s)	Singapore
2nd place, silver medalist(s)	Austria
3rd place, bronze medalist(s)	Indonesia
4.	Ireland
5.	Philippines
6.	Hong Kong
7.	India
8.	Malaysia
9.	Zimbabwe
10.	Chinese Taipei
Source: FINA
