= National team appearances in the men's Olympic water polo tournament =

National team of men's Olympic

This article presents the national team appearances in the men's Olympic water polo tournament since the inaugural official edition in 1900.

As of the 2020 Summer Olympics, 52 men's national water polo teams from six continents have competed at the Olympic Games. European teams have won all 27 official tournaments. The inaugural winners in 1900 were Great Britain; the current champions are Serbia. The most successful team is currently Hungary men's team, who has won the Olympic title on nine occasions.

== Abbreviations ==
Apps	Appearances	Rk	Rank	Ref	Reference
p.	page	pp.	pages		

== Team statistics ==
=== Comprehensive team results by tournament ===
Note: Results of Olympic qualification tournaments are not included. Numbers refer to the final placing of each team at the respective Games; italic number in header means unofficial tournament was held. Last updated: 11 February 2024.

Legend

- 1 – Champions
- 2 – Runners-up
- 3 – Third place
- 4 – Fourth place
- – Qualified but were not allowed to compete
- – Disqualified
- — – The nation did not participate in the Games
- Q – Qualified for forthcoming tournament
- – Hosts
- = – More than one team tied for that rank
- Team^{†} – Defunct team

Abbreviation

- stats – Olympic water polo team statistics
- EUA – United Team of Germany
- FRG – West Germany
- FRY – FR Yugoslavia
- GDR – East Germany
- SCG – Serbia and Montenegro

Africa – CANA (2 teams)
Men's team	00	04	08	12	20	24	28	32	36	48	52	56	60	64	68	72	76	80	84	88	92	96	00	04	08	12	16	20	24	Years
Egypt (stats)	—	—	—					—		7	10	—	13	12	15			—						12						6
South Africa	—										14		9	—	—	—	—	—	—	—								12	WD	3

Americas – UANA (8 teams)
Men's team	00	04	08	12	20	24	28	32	36	48	52	56	60	64	68	72	76	80	84	88	92	96	00	04	08	12	16	20	24	Years
Argentina		—		—			13			10	16		11					—												4
Brazil (stats)	—	—	—	—	6		—	(Note: At the 1932 Olympics, Brazil was disqualified after their players attacked the Hungarian referee at the end of their match against Germany. Their two matches were annulled. Therefore, Hungary and Japan won their games scheduled with Brazil, by forfeit. For more details, please see the Official Report of the 1932 Olympic Games (pp. 650–651), and here.)			9		12	13	13				12								8			8
Canada (stats)																16	9	—	10						11					4
Chile	—	—	—					—		17								—												1
Cuba			—	—	—										8	9	7	5	—	—	8									5
Mexico		—	—	—	—						18				11	13	10													4
United States (stats)					4	3	7	3	9	11	4	5	7	9	5	3		—	2	2	4	7	6	7	2	8	10	6	3	23
Uruguay	—	—	—	—	—				13	16								—												2

Asia – AASF (7 teams)
Men's team	00	04	08	12	20	24	28	32	36	48	52	56	60	64	68	72	76	80	84	88	92	96	00	04	08	12	16	20	24	Years
China	—	—	—	—	—	—	—	—	—	—		—	—	—	—	—	—	—	9	11					12					3
India		—	—	—						12	21																			2
Iran		—	—	—	—	—	—	—	—								12	—	—											1
Japan (stats)	—	—	—					4	14	—			14	11	12	15		—	11								12	10	11	10
Kazakhstan (stats)	—	—	—	—	—	Part of Soviet Union															(Note: In 1992, 12 of the 15 former Soviet Republics competed together as the Unified Team and marched under the Olympic Flag in the Barcelona Games.)		9	11		11		11		4
Singapore	—	—	—	—	—	—	—	—	—			10		—				—												1
South Korea	—	—	—	—	—	—	—	—	—									—		12										1

Europe – LEN (34 teams)
Men's team	00	04	08	12	20	24	28	32	36	48	52	56	60	64	68	72	76	80	84	88	92	96	00	04	08	12	16	20	24	Years
Austria				4	—				7		13																			3
Belgium (stats)	2	—	2	3	2	2	6		3	4	6		16	7																11
Bulgaria	—	—	—	—	—			—		—						11		12	—											2
Croatia (stats)	—	—	—	—	Part of Yugoslavia																	2	7	10	6	1	2	5	2	8
Czechoslovakia^{†}	—	—	—	—	12	6	10		11										—		12	Defunct								5
East Germany^{†}	Part of Germany											P. of EUA			6				—		Part of Germany									1
France (stats)	3 (Note: France had four teams compete in 1900. Bronze medals were given to the losers of both semifinals; France took both bronze. Bill Burgess, a member of one of the French bronze team was a British nationality, so later IOC attributed one bronze medal to Mixed team.)	—		6	9	1	3		4	6			10							10	11						11		10	12
Germany (stats)	=5				—	—	1	2	2	—	15	See EUA			See FRG and GDR						7	9		5	10					9
Great Britain (stats)	1		1	1	1	8	4		8	13	12	7														12				11
Greece (stats)					8	13				15					14	14		10	8	9	10	6	10	4	7	9	6	2	5	17
Hungary (stats)				5	—	5	2	1	1	2	1	1	3	1	3	2	1	3	—	5	6	4	1	1	1	5	5	3	4	24
Iceland	—	—	—		—	—	—	—	15																					1
Ireland	—	—	—	—	—	9	14		—																					2
Italy (stats)		—			10	11				1	3	4	1	4	4	6	2	8	7	7	1	3	5	8	9	2	3	7	7	22
Luxembourg	—	—	—				11	—																						1
Malta	—	—	—	—	—	—	8	—	16		—	—		—			—													2
Montenegro (stats)	—	—	—	—	Part of Yugoslavia																P. of FRY / SCG				4	4	4	8	9	5
Netherlands (stats)		—	4		5	7	5		5	3	5		8	8	7	7	3	6	6		9	10	11							17
Portugal	—	—	—								20																			1
Romania (stats)		—	—	—	—			—		—	17	8	5	5		8	4	9				11				10			12	10
Russia (stats)	—	—	—	—	—	Part of Soviet Union																5	2	3						3
Serbia (stats)	—	—	—		Part of Yugoslavia																P. of FRY / SCG				3	3	1	1	1	5
Serbia and Montenegro^{†} (stats)	—	—	—	—	Part of Yugoslavia																See FRY			2	Defunct					1
Slovakia	—	—	—	—	Part of Czechoslovakia																		12							1
Soviet Union^{†} (Note: The Olympic Committee of the Soviet Union was formed on 21 April 1951, and was recognised by the International Olympic Committee on 7 May 1951.) (stats)	—	—	—	—	—	—	—	—	—	—	7	3	2	3	2	1	8	1	—	3	Defunct									9
Spain (stats)		—	—	—	7	10	9		—	8	8	—			9	10		4	4	6	2	1	4	6	5	6	7	4	6	19
Sweden (stats)		—	3	2	3	4			6	5	11							11												8
Switzerland					11	12	12		12	14		—																		5
Ukraine	—	—	—	—	—	—	—	—	—	—	Part of Soviet Union											12								1
(International Olympic Committee) Unified Team^{†} (stats)	—	—	—	—	—	Part of Soviet Union															3	Defunct								1
United Team of Germany^{†} (stats)	See Germany											6	6	6	See FRG and GDR						See Germany									3
West Germany^{†} (stats)	Part of Germany											P. of EUA			10	4	6	—	3	4	Part of Germany									5
Yugoslavia^{†} (stats)	—	—	—	—					10	9	2	2	4	2	1	5	5	2	1	1	Defunct									12
Yugoslavia^{†} (Note: After the breakup of Yugoslavia, FR Yugoslavia men's national water polo team participated at the 1996 and 2000 Olympics, and won a bronze medal in 2000. In 2003, after the country was renamed from FR Yugoslavia to Serbia and Montenegro, the team was also renamed to "Serbia and Montenegro men's national water polo team". Despite the renaming of the country name, both team of FR Yugoslavia and team of Serbia and Montenegro represented the same national entity: a joint state of Montenegro and Serbia.) (stats)	—	—	—	—	Part of Yugoslavia																—	8	3	Defunct						2

Oceania – OSA (1 team)
Men's team	00	04	08	12	20	24	28	32	36	48	52	56	60	64	68	72	76	80	84	88	92	96	00	04	08	12	16	20	24	Years
Australia (stats)			—	—						18	19	9	15	10	(Note: While Australia had qualified to compete as one of sixteen water polo teams, the Australian Olympic Committee (AOC) did not endorse them. The Australian players responded by paying their own way to travel to Mexico City, but the team were not allowed to compete. For more details, please see here (1, 2).)	12	11	7	5	8	5		8	9	8	7	9	9	8	18

Men's team	00	04	08	12	20	24	28	32	36	48	52	56	60	64	68	72	76	80	84	88	92	96	00	04	08	12	16	20	24	Years
Total teams	7		4	6	12	13	14	5	16	18	21	10	16	13	15	16	12	12	12	12	12	12	12	12	12	12	12	12	12	

=== Debut of teams ===
Last updated: 12 February 2024.

Legend

- Team^{*} – Host team
- Team^{†} – Defunct team

#	Year	Debuting teams					Number	Cumulative total
#	Year	Africa	Americas	Asia	Europe	Oceania	Number	Cumulative total
1	1900	–	–	–	Belgium, France^{*}, Germany, Great Britain	–	4	4
2	1904	Water polo was an unofficial sport						
3	1908	–	–	–	Netherlands, Sweden	–	2	6
4	1912	–	–	–	Austria, Hungary	–	2	8
5	1920	–	Brazil, United States	–	Czechoslovakia^{†}, Greece, Italy, Spain, Switzerland	–	7	15
6	1924	–	–	–	Ireland	–	1	16
7	1928	–	Argentina	–	Luxembourg, Malta	–	3	19
8	1932	–	–	Japan	–	–	1	20
9	1936	–	Uruguay	–	Iceland, Yugoslavia^{†}	–	3	23
10	1948	Egypt	Chile	India	–	Australia	4	27
11	1952	South Africa	Mexico	–	Portugal, Romania, Soviet Union^{†}	–	5	32
12	1956	–	–	Singapore	United Team of Germany^{†}	–	2	34
13	1960	–	–	–	–	–	0	34
14	1964	–	–	–	–	–	0	34
#	Year	Africa	Americas	Asia	Europe	Oceania	Number	Cumulative total
15	1968	–	Cuba	–	East Germany^{†}, West Germany^{†}	–	3	37
16	1972	–	Canada	–	Bulgaria	–	2	39
17	1976	–	–	Iran	–	–	1	40
18	1980	–	–	–	–	–	0	40
19	1984	–	–	China	–	–	1	41
20	1988	–	–	South Korea^{*}	–	–	1	42
21	1992	–	–	–	(International Olympic Committee) Unified Team^{†}	–	1	43
22	1996	–	–	–	Croatia, Russia, Ukraine, Yugoslavia^{†}	–	4	47
23	2000	–	–	Kazakhstan	Slovakia	–	2	49
24	2004	–	–	–	Serbia and Montenegro^{†}	–	1	50
25	2008	–	–	–	Montenegro, Serbia	–	2	52
26	2012	–	–	–	–	–	0	52
27	2016	–	–	–	–	–	0	52
28	2020	–	–	–	–	–	0	52
29	2024	–	–	–	–	–	0	52
Total		2	8	7	34	1	52	52

=== Number of appearances by team ===
The following table is pre-sorted by number of appearances (in descending order), year of the last appearance (in ascending order), year of the first appearance (in ascending order), name of the team (in ascending order), respectively. Last updated: 8 August 2021.

Legend and abbreviation

- Year^{*} – As host team
- Team^{†} – Defunct team
- Apps – Appearances
- stats – Olympic water polo team statistics

Number of appearances by team
Rk	Men's team	Apps	Record streak	Active streak	Debut	Most recent	Best finish	Confederation
1	Hungary (stats)	23	13	9	1912	2020	Champions	Europe – LEN
2	United States (stats)	22	12	10	1920	2020	Runners-up	Americas – UANA
3	Italy (stats)	21	19	19	1920	2020	Champions	Europe – LEN
4	Spain (stats)	18	11	11	1920	2020	Champions	Europe – LEN
5	Netherlands (stats)	17	7	0	1908	2000	Third place	Europe – LEN
5	Australia (stats)	17	6	6	1948	2020	Fifth place	Oceania – OSA
7	Greece (stats)	16	11	11	1920	2020	Runners-up	Europe – LEN
8	Yugoslavia^{†} (stats)	12	12	0	1936	1988	Champions	Europe – LEN
9	Belgium (stats)	11	5	0	1900	1964	Runners-up	Europe – LEN
9	Great Britain (stats)	11	5	0	1900	2012^{*}	Champions	Europe – LEN
9	France (stats)	11	4	0	1900^{*}	2016	Champions	Europe – LEN
12	Soviet Union^{†} (stats)	9	8	0	1952	1988	Champions	Europe – LEN
12	Germany (stats)	9	3	0	1900	2008	Champions	Europe – LEN
12	Romania (stats)	9	4	0	1952	2012	Fourth place	Europe – LEN
12	Japan (stats)	9	4	2	1932	2020^{*}	Fourth place	Asia – AASF
16	Sweden (stats)	8	4	0	1908	1980	Runners-up	Europe – LEN
16	Brazil (stats)	8	3	0	1920	2016^{*}	Sixth place	Americas – UANA
18	Croatia (stats)	7	7	7	1996	2020	Champions	Europe – LEN
19	Egypt (stats)	6	3	0	1948	2004	Seventh place	Africa – CANA
20	Switzerland	5	3	0	1920	1948	Eleventh place	Europe – LEN
20	West Germany^{†} (stats)	5	3	0	1968	1988	Third place	Europe – LEN
20	Czechoslovakia^{†}	5	3	0	1920	1992	Sixth place	Europe – LEN
20	Cuba	5	4	0	1968	1992	Fifth place	Americas – UANA
24	Argentina	4	2	0	1928	1960	Tenth place	Americas – UANA
24	Mexico	4	3	0	1952	1976	Tenth place	Americas – UANA
24	Canada (stats)	4	2	0	1972	2008	Ninth place	Americas – UANA
24	Kazakhstan (stats)	4	2	1	2000	2020	Ninth place	Asia – AASF
24	Montenegro (stats)	4	4	4	2008	2020	Fourth place	Europe – LEN
24	Serbia (stats)	4	4	4	2008	2020	Champions	Europe – LEN
30	Austria	3	1	0	1912	1952	Fourth place	Europe – LEN
30	United Team of Germany^{†} (stats)	3	3	0	1956	1964	Sixth place	Europe – LEN
30	Russia (stats)	3	3	0	1996	2004	Runners-up	Europe – LEN
30	China	3	2	0	1984	2008^{*}	Ninth place	Asia – AASF
30	South Africa	3	1	1	1952	2020	Ninth place	Africa – CANA
35	Ireland	2	2	0	1924	1928	Ninth place	Europe – LEN
35	Malta	2	1	0	1928	1936	Eighth place	Europe – LEN
35	Uruguay	2	2	0	1936	1948	Thirteenth place	Americas – UANA
35	India	2	2	0	1948	1952	Twelfth place	Asia – AASF
35	Bulgaria	2	1	0	1972	1980	Eleventh place	Europe – LEN
35	Yugoslavia^{†} (stats)	2	2	0	1996	2000	Third place	Europe – LEN
41	Luxembourg	1	1	0	1928	1928	Eleventh place	Europe – LEN
41	Iceland	1	1	0	1936	1936	Fifteenth place	Europe – LEN
41	Chile	1	1	0	1948	1948	Seventeenth place	Americas – UANA
41	Portugal	1	1	0	1952	1952	Twentieth place	Europe – LEN
41	Singapore	1	1	0	1956	1956	Tenth place	Asia – AASF
41	East Germany^{†}	1	1	0	1968	1968	Sixth place	Europe – LEN
41	Iran	1	1	0	1976	1976	Twelfth place	Asia – AASF
41	South Korea	1	1	0	1988^{*}	1988^{*}	Twelfth place	Asia – AASF
41	(International Olympic Committee) Unified Team^{†} (stats)	1	1	0	1992	1992	Third place	Europe – LEN
41	Ukraine	1	1	0	1996	1996	Twelfth place	Europe – LEN
41	Slovakia	1	1	0	2000	2000	Twelfth place	Europe – LEN
41	Serbia and Montenegro^{†} (stats)	1	1	0	2004	2004	Runners-up	Europe – LEN
Rk	Men's team	Apps	Record streak	Active streak	Debut	Most recent	Best finish	Confederation

=== Results of host teams ===
Last updated: 11 August 2024.

Legend and abbreviation

- Year^{*} – As host team
- Team^{†} – Defunct team
- Finish^{‡} – It is the best performance of the team
- Apps – Appearances

#	Year	Host team	Finish	Best finish	Apps	Confederation
1	1900	France	3rd of 7 teams	Champions (1924^{*})	11	Europe – LEN
2	1904	Water polo was an unofficial sport				
3	1908	Great Britain	1st^{‡} of 4 teams	Champions (1900, 1908^{*}, 1912, 1920)	11	Europe – LEN
4	1912	Sweden	2nd^{‡} of 6 teams	Runners-up (1912^{*})	8	Europe – LEN
5	1920	Belgium	2nd^{‡} of 12 teams	Runners-up (1900, 1908, 1920^{*}, 1924)	11	Europe – LEN
6	1924	France	1st^{‡} of 13 teams	Champions (1924^{*})	11	Europe – LEN
7	1928	Netherlands	5th of 14 teams	Third place (1948, 1976)	17	Europe – LEN
8	1932	United States	3rd of 5 teams	Runners-up (1984^{*}, 1988, 2008)	22	Americas – UANA
9	1936	Germany	2nd of 16 teams	Champions (1928)	9	Europe – LEN
10	1948	Great Britain	13th of 18 teams	Champions (1900, 1908^{*}, 1912, 1920)	11	Europe – LEN
11	1952	Finland	did not participate	—	0	Europe – LEN
12	1956	Australia	9th of 10 teams	Fifth place (1984, 1992)	17	Oceania – OSA
13	1960	Italy	1st^{‡} of 16 teams	Champions (1948, 1960^{*}, 1992)	21	Europe – LEN
14	1964	Japan	11th of 13 teams	Fourth place (1932)	9	Asia – AASF
#	Year	Host team	Finish	Best finish	Apps	Confederation
15	1968	Mexico	11th of 15 teams	Tenth place (1976)	4	Americas – UANA
16	1972	West Germany^{†}	4th of 16 teams	Third place (1984)	5	Europe – LEN
17	1976	Canada	9th^{‡} of 12 teams	Ninth place (1976^{*})	4	Americas – UANA
18	1980	Soviet Union^{†}	1st^{‡} of 12 teams	Champions (1972, 1980^{*})	9	Europe – LEN
19	1984	United States	2nd^{‡} of 12 teams	Runners-up (1984^{*}, 1988, 2008)	22	Americas – UANA
20	1988	South Korea	12th^{‡} of 12 teams	Twelfth place (1988^{*})	1	Asia – AASF
21	1992	Spain	2nd of 12 teams	Champions (1996)	18	Europe – LEN
22	1996	United States	7th of 12 teams	Runners-up (1984^{*}, 1988, 2008)	22	Americas – UANA
23	2000	Australia	8th of 12 teams	Fifth place (1984, 1992)	17	Oceania – OSA
24	2004	Greece	4th of 12 teams	Runners-up (2020)	16	Europe – LEN
25	2008	China	12th of 12 teams	Ninth place (1984)	3	Asia – AASF
26	2012	Great Britain	12th of 12 teams	Champions (1900, 1908^{*}, 1912, 1920)	11	Europe – LEN
27	2016	Brazil	8th of 12 teams	Sixth place (1920)	8	Americas – UANA
28	2020	Japan	10th of 12 teams	Fourth place (1932)	9	Asia – AASF
29	2024	France	10th of 12 teams	Champions (1924^{*})	12	Europe – LEN
#	Year	Host team	Finish	Best finish	Apps	Confederation

=== Results of defending champions and runners-up ===
Last updated: 11 August 2024.

Legend

- Team^{*} – Host team
- Team^{†} – Defunct team

#	Year	Defending champions	Finish	Defending runners-up	Finish
1	1900				
2	1904	Water polo was an unofficial sport			
3	1908				
4	1912	Great Britain	1st of 6 teams	Belgium	3rd of 6 teams
5	1920	Great Britain	1st of 12 teams	Sweden	3rd of 12 teams
6	1924	Great Britain	8th of 13 teams	Belgium	2nd of 13 teams
7	1928	France	3rd of 14 teams	Belgium	6th of 14 teams
8	1932	Germany	2nd of 5 teams	Hungary	1st of 5 teams
9	1936	Hungary	1st of 16 teams	Germany^{*}	2nd of 16 teams
10	1948	Hungary	2nd of 18 teams	Germany	did not participate
11	1952	Italy	3rd of 21 teams	Hungary	1st of 21 teams
12	1956	Hungary	1st of 10 teams	Yugoslavia^{†}	2nd of 10 teams
13	1960	Hungary	3rd of 16 teams	Yugoslavia^{†}	4th of 16 teams
14	1964	Italy	4th of 13 teams	Soviet Union^{†}	3rd of 13 teams
#	Year	Defending champions	Finish	Defending runners-up	Finish
15	1968	Hungary	3rd of 15 teams	Yugoslavia^{†}	1st of 15 teams
16	1972	Yugoslavia^{†}	5th of 16 teams	Soviet Union^{†}	1st of 16 teams
17	1976	Soviet Union^{†}	8th of 12 teams	Hungary	1st of 12 teams
18	1980	Hungary	3rd of 12 teams	Italy	8th of 12 teams
19	1984	Soviet Union^{†}	Qualified but withdrew	Yugoslavia^{†}	1st of 12 teams
20	1988	Yugoslavia^{†}	1st of 12 teams	United States	2nd of 12 teams
21	1992	Yugoslavia^{†}	Defunct	United States	4th of 12 teams
22	1996	Italy	3rd of 12 teams	Spain	1st of 12 teams
23	2000	Spain	4th of 12 teams	Croatia	7th of 12 teams
24	2004	Hungary	1st of 12 teams	Russia	3rd of 12 teams
25	2008	Hungary	1st of 12 teams	Serbia and Montenegro^{†}	Defunct
26	2012	Hungary	5th of 12 teams	United States	8th of 12 teams
27	2016	Croatia	2nd of 12 teams	Italy	3rd of 12 teams
28	2020	Serbia	1st of 12 teams	Croatia	5th of 12 teams
29	2024	Serbia	1st of 12 teams	Greece	5th of 12 teams
30	2028	Serbia	TBD of 12 teams	Croatia	TBD
#	Year	Defending champions	Finish	Defending runners-up	Finish

=== Best finishes by team ===
The following table is pre-sorted by best finish (in descending order), name of the team (in ascending order), respectively. Last updated: 8 August 2021.

Legend and abbreviation

- Year^{*} – As host team
- Team^{†} – Defunct team
- Apps – Appearances
- stats – Olympic water polo team statistics

Best finishes by team
Rk	Men's team	Best finish	Apps	Confederation
1	Hungary (stats)	Champions (1932, 1936, 1952, 1956, 1964, 1976, 2000, 2004, 2008)	23	Europe – LEN
2	Great Britain (stats)	Champions (1900, 1908^{*}, 1912, 1920)	11	Europe – LEN
3	Italy (stats)	Champions (1948, 1960^{*}, 1992)	21	Europe – LEN
3	Yugoslavia^{†} (stats)	Champions (1968, 1984, 1988)	12	Europe – LEN
5	Serbia (stats)	Champions (2016, 2020)	4	Europe – LEN
5	Soviet Union^{†} (stats)	Champions (1972, 1980^{*})	9	Europe – LEN
7	Croatia (stats)	Champions (2012)	7	Europe – LEN
7	France (stats)	Champions (1924^{*})	11	Europe – LEN
7	Germany (stats)	Champions (1928)	9	Europe – LEN
7	Spain (stats)	Champions (1996)	18	Europe – LEN
11	Belgium (stats)	Runners-up (1900, 1908, 1920^{*}, 1924)	11	Europe – LEN
12	United States (stats)	Runners-up (1984^{*}, 1988, 2008)	22	Americas – UANA
13	Greece (stats)	Runners-up (2020)	16	Europe – LEN
13	Russia (stats)	Runners-up (2000)	3	Europe – LEN
13	Serbia and Montenegro^{†} (stats)	Runners-up (2004)	1	Europe – LEN
13	Sweden (stats)	Runners-up (1912^{*})	8	Europe – LEN
17	Netherlands (stats)	Third place (1948, 1976)	17	Europe – LEN
18	(International Olympic Committee) Unified Team^{†} (stats)	Third place (1992)	1	Europe – LEN
18	West Germany^{†} (stats)	Third place (1984)	5	Europe – LEN
18	Yugoslavia^{†} (stats)	Third place (2000)	2	Europe – LEN
21	Montenegro (stats)	Fourth place (2008, 2012, 2016)	4	Europe – LEN
22	Austria	Fourth place (1912)	3	Europe – LEN
22	Japan (stats)	Fourth place (1932)	9	Asia – AASF
22	Romania (stats)	Fourth place (1976)	9	Europe – LEN
25	Australia (stats)	Fifth place (1984, 1992)	17	Oceania – OSA
26	Cuba	Fifth place (1980)	5	Americas – UANA
27	United Team of Germany^{†} (stats)	Sixth place (1956, 1960, 1964)	3	Europe – LEN
28	Brazil (stats)	Sixth place (1920)	8	Americas – UANA
28	Czechoslovakia^{†}	Sixth place (1924)	5	Europe – LEN
28	East Germany^{†}	Sixth place (1968)	1	Europe – LEN
31	Egypt (stats)	Seventh place (1948)	6	Africa – CANA
32	Malta	Eighth place (1928)	2	Europe – LEN
33	Canada (stats)	Ninth place (1976^{*})	4	Americas – UANA
33	China	Ninth place (1984)	3	Asia – AASF
33	Ireland	Ninth place (1924)	2	Europe – LEN
33	Kazakhstan (stats)	Ninth place (2000)	4	Asia – AASF
33	South Africa	Ninth place (1960)	3	Africa – CANA
38	Argentina	Tenth place (1948)	4	Americas – UANA
38	Mexico	Tenth place (1976)	4	Americas – UANA
38	Singapore	Tenth place (1956)	1	Asia – AASF
41	Bulgaria	Eleventh place (1972)	2	Europe – LEN
41	Luxembourg	Eleventh place (1928)	1	Europe – LEN
41	Switzerland	Eleventh place (1920)	5	Europe – LEN
44	India	Twelfth place (1948)	2	Asia – AASF
44	Iran	Twelfth place (1976)	1	Asia – AASF
44	Slovakia	Twelfth place (2000)	1	Europe – LEN
44	South Korea	Twelfth place (1988^{*})	1	Asia – AASF
44	Ukraine	Twelfth place (1996)	1	Europe – LEN
49	Uruguay	Thirteenth place (1936)	2	Americas – UANA
50	Iceland	Fifteenth place (1936)	1	Europe – LEN
51	Chile	Seventeenth place (1948)	1	Americas – UANA
52	Portugal	Twentieth place (1952)	1	Europe – LEN
Rk	Men's team	Best finish	Apps	Confederation

=== Finishes in the top four ===
The following table is pre-sorted by total finishes in the top four (in descending order), number of Olympic gold medals (in descending order), number of Olympic silver medals (in descending order), number of Olympic bronze medals (in descending order), name of the team (in ascending order), respectively. Last updated: 8 August 2021.

Legend

- Year^{*} – As host team
- Team^{†} – Defunct team

Rk	Men's team	Total	Champions	Runners-up	Third place	Fourth place	First	Last
1	Hungary	18	9 (1932, 1936, 1952, 1956, 1964, 1976, 2000, 2004, 2008)	3 (1928, 1948, 1972)	4 (1960, 1968, 1980, 2020)	2 (1996, 2024)	1928	2024
2	Italy	11	3 (1948, 1960^{*}, 1992)	2 (1976, 2012)	3 (1952, 1996, 2016)	3 (1956, 1964, 1968)	1948	2016
3	United States	10		3 (1984^{*}, 1988, 2008)	4 (1924, 1932^{*}, 1972, 2024)	3 (1920, 1952, 1992)	1920	2024
4	Yugoslavia^{†}	8	3 (1968, 1984, 1988)	4 (1952, 1956, 1964, 1980)		1 (1960)	1952	1988
5	Soviet Union^{†}	7	2 (1972, 1980^{*})	2 (1960, 1968)	3 (1956, 1964, 1988)		1956	1988
6	Belgium	7		4 (1900, 1908, 1920^{*}, 1924)	2 (1912, 1936)	1 (1948)	1900	1948
7	Spain	6	1 (1996)	1 (1992^{*})		4 (1980, 1984, 2000, 2020)	1980	2020
8	Great Britain	5	4 (1900, 1908^{*}, 1912, 1920)			1 (1928)	1900	1928
9	Serbia	5	3 (2016, 2020, 2024)		2 (2008, 2012)		2008	2024
10	France	5	1 (1924^{*})		3 (1900^{*}×2, 1928)	1 (1936)	1900	1936
11	Croatia	4	1 (2012)	3 (1996, 2016, 2024)			1996	2024
12	Sweden	4		1 (1912^{*})	2 (1908, 1920)	1 (1924)	1908	1924
13	Germany	3	1 (1928)	2 (1932, 1936^{*})			1928	1936
14	Netherlands	3			2 (1948, 1976)	1 (1908)	1908	1976
15	West Germany^{†}	3			1 (1984)	2 (1972^{*}, 1988)	1972	1988
16	Montenegro	3				3 (2008, 2012, 2016)	2008	2016
17	Russia	2		1 (2000)	1 (2004)		2000	2004
18	Greece	2		1 (2020)		1 (2004^{*})	2004	2020
19	Serbia and Montenegro^{†}	1		1 (2004)			2004	2004
20	Yugoslavia^{†}	1			1 (2000)		2000	2000
20	(International Olympic Committee) Unified Team^{†}	1			1 (1992)		1992	1992
22	Austria	1				1 (1912)	1912	1912
22	Japan	1				1 (1932)	1932	1932
22	Romania	1				1 (1976)	1976	1976
Rk	Men's team	Total	Champions	Runners-up	Third place	Fourth place	First	Last

=== Medal table ===
The following table is pre-sorted by number of Olympic gold medals (in descending order), number of Olympic silver medals (in descending order), number of Olympic bronze medals (in descending order), name of the team (in ascending order), respectively. Last updated: 11 August 2024.

Hungary is the most successful country in the men's Olympic water polo tournament, with nine gold, three silver and four bronze.

Legend

- Team^{†} – Defunct team

Rank	Men's team	Gold	Silver	Bronze	Total
1	Hungary (HUN)	9	3	4	16
2	Yugoslavia (YUG)^{†}	3	4	0	7
3	Italy (ITA)	3	2	3	8
4	Serbia (SRB)	3	0	2	5
5	Great Britain (GBR) (Note: British team won gold medal in 1900. Victor Lindberg, a member of British team was a New Zealander, so later IOC attributed gold medal to Mixed team.)	3	0	0	3
6	Soviet Union (URS)^{†}	2	2	3	7
7	United States (USA) (Note: Previously, the International Olympic Committee and International Swimming Federation (FINA) considered the water polo event at the 1904 Olympics as a demonstration sport. However, in July 2021, after accepting the recommendation of Olympic historian Bill Mallon, the IOC recognized water polo along with several others as an official sport of the 1904 Olympic program.)	1	4	5	10
8	Croatia (CRO)	1	3	0	4
9	Germany (GER)	1	2	0	3
10	Spain (ESP)	1	1	0	2
11	France (FRA)	1	0	2	3
12	Mixed team^{†}	1	0	1	2
13	Belgium (BEL)	0	4	2	6
14	Sweden (SWE)	0	1	2	3
15	Russia (RUS)	0	1	1	2
15	Serbia and Montenegro (SCG)^{†}	0	1	1	2
17	Greece (GRE)	0	1	0	1
18	Netherlands (NED)	0	0	2	2
19	Unified Team^{†}	0	0	1	1
19	West Germany (FRG)^{†}	0	0	1	1
Totals (20 entries)		29	29	30	88

=== Longest active appearance droughts ===
The following table is pre-sorted by number of Olympic tournaments missed (in descending order), year of the last appearance (in ascending order), name of the team (in ascending order), respectively. Last updated: 8 August 2021.

Notes:

- Does not include teams that have not yet made their first appearance at the Olympics or teams that no longer exist.
- With the exception of 1916, 1940 and 1944, does not include droughts when the Olympic tournament was not held due to World War I and II.

Legend

- Year^{*} – As host team

Longest active appearance droughts
Rk	Men's team	Last appearance	Olympics missed	Best finish	Confederation
1	Ireland	1928	21	Ninth place	Europe – LEN
1	Luxembourg	1928	21	Eleventh place	Europe – LEN
3	Iceland	1936	19	Fifteenth place	Europe – LEN
3	Malta	1936	19	Eighth place	Europe – LEN
5	Chile	1948	18	Seventeenth place	Americas – UANA
5	Switzerland	1948	18	Eleventh place	Europe – LEN
5	Uruguay	1948	18	Thirteenth place	Americas – UANA
8	Austria	1952	17	Fourth place	Europe – LEN
8	India	1952	17	Twelfth place	Asia – AASF
8	Portugal	1952	17	Twentieth place	Europe – LEN
11	Singapore	1956	16	Tenth place	Asia – AASF
12	Argentina	1960	15	Tenth place	Americas – UANA
13	Belgium	1964	14	Runners-up	Europe – LEN
14	Iran	1976	11	Twelfth place	Asia – AASF
14	Mexico	1976	11	Tenth place	Americas – UANA
16	Bulgaria	1980	10	Eleventh place	Europe – LEN
16	Sweden	1980	10	Runners-up	Europe – LEN
18	South Korea	1988^{*}	8	Twelfth place	Asia – AASF
19	Cuba	1992	7	Fifth place	Americas – UANA
20	Ukraine	1996	6	Twelfth place	Europe – LEN
21	Netherlands	2000	5	Third place	Europe – LEN
21	Slovakia	2000	5	Twelfth place	Europe – LEN
23	Egypt	2004	4	Seventh place	Africa – CANA
23	Russia	2004	4	Runners-up	Europe – LEN
25	Canada	2008	3	Ninth place	Americas – UANA
25	China	2008^{*}	3	Ninth place	Asia – AASF
25	Germany	2008	3	Champions	Europe – LEN
28	Great Britain	2012^{*}	2	Champions	Europe – LEN
28	Romania	2012	2	Fourth place	Europe – LEN
30	Brazil	2016^{*}	1	Sixth place	Americas – UANA
30	France	2016	1	Champions	Europe – LEN
32	Australia	2020	0	Fifth place	Oceania – OSA
32	Croatia	2020	0	Champions	Europe – LEN
32	Greece	2020	0	Runners-up	Europe – LEN
32	Hungary	2020	0	Champions	Europe – LEN
32	Italy	2020	0	Champions	Europe – LEN
32	Japan	2020^{*}	0	Fourth place	Asia – AASF
32	Kazakhstan	2020	0	Ninth place	Asia – AASF
32	Montenegro	2020	0	Fourth place	Europe – LEN
32	Serbia	2020	0	Champions	Europe – LEN
32	South Africa	2020	0	Ninth place	Africa – CANA
32	Spain	2020	0	Champions	Europe – LEN
32	United States	2020	0	Runners-up	Americas – UANA
Rk	Men's team	Last appearance	Olympics missed	Best finish	Confederation

=== Longest appearance droughts overall ===
The following table is pre-sorted by number of Olympic tournaments missed (in descending order), year of the previous appearance (in ascending order), name of the team (in ascending order), respectively. Last updated: 8 August 2021.

Notes:

- Only includes droughts begun after a team's first appearance and until the team ceased to exist.
- With the exception of 1916, 1940 and 1944, does not include droughts when the Olympic tournament was not held due to World War I and II.

Legend

- Year^{*} – As host team
- Team^{†} – Defunct team

Longest appearance droughts overall
Rk	Men's team	Prev. appearance	Next appearance	Olympics missed	Best finish	Confederation
1	Ireland	1928	active	21	Ninth place	Europe – LEN
1	Luxembourg	1928	active	21	Eleventh place	Europe – LEN
3	Iceland	1936	active	19	Fifteenth place	Europe – LEN
3	Malta	1936	active	19	Eighth place	Europe – LEN
5	Chile	1948	active	18	Seventeenth place	Americas – UANA
5	Switzerland	1948	active	18	Eleventh place	Europe – LEN
5	Uruguay	1948	active	18	Thirteenth place	Americas – UANA
8	Austria	1952	active	17	Fourth place	Europe – LEN
8	India	1952	active	17	Twelfth place	Asia – AASF
8	Portugal	1952	active	17	Twentieth place	Europe – LEN
11	Singapore	1956	active	16	Tenth place	Asia – AASF
12	Argentina	1960	active	15	Tenth place	Americas – UANA
13	South Africa	1960	2020	14	Ninth place	Africa – CANA
13	Belgium	1964	active	14	Runners-up	Europe – LEN
15	Great Britain	1956	2012^{*}	13	Champions	Europe – LEN
16	Czechoslovakia^{†}	1936	1992	11	Sixth place	Europe – LEN
16	Iran	1976	active	11	Twelfth place	Asia – AASF
16	Mexico	1976	active	11	Tenth place	Americas – UANA
19	Bulgaria	1980	active	10	Eleventh place	Europe – LEN
19	Sweden	1980	active	10	Runners-up	Europe – LEN
21	Germany	1952	1992	9	Champions	Europe – LEN
22	Egypt	1968	2004	8	Seventh place	Africa – CANA
22	South Korea	1988^{*}	active	8	Twelfth place	Asia – AASF
24	Brazil	1984	2016^{*}	7	Sixth place	Americas – UANA
24	Japan	1984	2016	7	Fourth place	Asia – AASF
24	Cuba	1992	active	7	Fifth place	Americas – UANA
27	France	1960	1988	6	Champions	Europe – LEN
27	Ukraine	1996	active	6	Twelfth place	Europe – LEN
29	Canada	1984	2008	5	Ninth place	Americas – UANA
29	Netherlands	2000	active	5	Third place	Europe – LEN
29	Slovakia	2000	active	5	Twelfth place	Europe – LEN
32	Greece	1948	1968	4	Runners-up	Europe – LEN
32	China	1988	2008^{*}	4	Ninth place	Asia – AASF
32	Russia	2004	active	4	Runners-up	Europe – LEN
35	Italy	1924	1948	3	Champions	Europe – LEN
35	Spain	1952	1968	3	Champions	Europe – LEN
35	Romania	1980	1996	3	Fourth place	Europe – LEN
35	Romania	1996	2012	3	Fourth place	Europe – LEN
38	United States	1972	1984^{*}	2	Runners-up	Americas – UANA
39	Hungary	1912	1924	1	Champions	Europe – LEN
39	Hungary	1980	1988	1	Champions	Europe – LEN
39	Australia	1964	1972	1	Fifth place	Oceania – OSA
39	Australia	1992	2000^{*}	1	Fifth place	Oceania – OSA
39	West Germany^{†}	1976	1984	1	Third place	Europe – LEN
39	Soviet Union^{†}	1980^{*}	1988	1	Champions	Europe – LEN
39	Kazakhstan	2004	2012	1	Ninth place	Asia – AASF
39	Kazakhstan	2012	2020	1	Ninth place	Asia – AASF
44	United Team of Germany^{†}	1964	defunct	0	Sixth place	Europe – LEN
44	East Germany^{†}	1968	defunct	0	Sixth place	Europe – LEN
44	Yugoslavia^{†}	1988	defunct	0	Champions	Europe – LEN
44	(International Olympic Committee) Unified Team^{†}	1992	defunct	0	Third place	Europe – LEN
44	Yugoslavia^{†}	2000	defunct	0	Third place	Europe – LEN
44	Serbia and Montenegro^{†}	2004	defunct	0	Runners-up	Europe – LEN
44	Croatia	2020	active	0	Champions	Europe – LEN
44	Montenegro	2020	active	0	Fourth place	Europe – LEN
44	Serbia	2020	active	0	Champions	Europe – LEN
Rk	Men's team	Prev. appearance	Next appearance	Olympics missed	Best finish	Confederation

=== Team records ===
Teams having equal quantities in the tables below are ordered by the tournament the quantity was attained in (the teams that attained the quantity first are listed first). If the quantity was attained by more than one team in the same tournament, these teams are ordered alphabetically. Last updated: 8 August 2021.

Legend

- Year^{*} – As host team
- Team^{†} – Defunct team

==== Appearances ====
Most appearances
23, Hungary (1912, 1924, 1928, 1932, 1936, 1948, 1952, 1956, 1960, 1964, 1968, 1972, 1976, 1980, 1988, 1992, 1996, 2000, 2004, 2008, 2012, 2016, 2020).
Most appearances, never winning a title
21, United States (1920, 1924, 1928, 1932^{*}, 1936, 1948, 1952, 1956, 1960, 1964, 1968, 1972, 1984^{*}, 1988, 1992, 1996^{*}, 2000, 2004, 2008, 2012, 2016).
Most appearances, never finishing in the top two
17, Netherlands (1908, 1920, 1924, 1928^{*}, 1936, 1948, 1952, 1960, 1964, 1968, 1972, 1976, 1980, 1984, 1992, 1996, 2000).
Most appearances, never winning a medal
16, Australia (1948, 1952, 1956^{*}, 1960, 1964, 1972, 1976, 1980, 1984, 1988, 1992, 2000^{*}, 2004, 2008, 2012, 2016).
Most appearances, never finishing in the top four
16, Australia (1948, 1952, 1956^{*}, 1960, 1964, 1972, 1976, 1980, 1984, 1988, 1992, 2000^{*}, 2004, 2008, 2012, 2016).
Fewest appearances
1, Luxembourg (1928), Iceland (1936), Chile (1948), Portugal (1952), Singapore (1956), East Germany^{†} (1968), Iran (1976), South Korea (1988^{*}), Unified Team^{†} (1992), Ukraine (1996), Slovakia (2000), Serbia and Montenegro^{†} (2004).
Fewest appearances, winning a title
4, Serbia (2008, 2012, 2016, 2020).
Fewest appearances, finishing in the top two
1, Serbia and Montenegro^{†} (2004).
Fewest appearances, finishing in the top two, active team
3, Russia (1996, 2000, 2004).
Fewest appearances, winning a medal
1, Unified Team^{†} (1992), Serbia and Montenegro^{†} (2004).
Fewest appearances, winning a medal, active team
3, Russia (1996, 2000, 2004).
Fewest appearances, finishing in the top four
1, Unified Team^{†} (1992), Serbia and Montenegro^{†} (2004).
Fewest appearances, finishing in the top four, active team
3, Austria (1912, 1936, 1952), Russia (1996, 2000, 2004).

==== Top four ====
Most titles won
9, Hungary (1932, 1936, 1952, 1956, 1964, 1976, 2000, 2004, 2008).
Most second-place finishes
4, Belgium (1900, 1908, 1920^{*}, 1924), Yugoslavia^{†} (1952, 1956, 1964, 1980).
Most third-place finishes
4, Hungary (1960, 1968, 1980, 2020).
Most fourth-place finishes
4, Spain (1980, 1984, 2000, 2020).
Most finishes in the top two
12, Hungary (1928, 1932, 1936, 1948, 1952, 1956, 1964, 1972, 1976, 2000, 2004, 2008).
Most finishes in the top two, never winning a title
4, Belgium (1900, 1908, 1920^{*}, 1924).
Most finishes in the top three
16, Hungary (1928, 1932, 1936, 1948, 1952, 1956, 1960, 1964, 1968, 1972, 1976, 1980, 2000, 2004, 2008, 2020).
Most finishes in the top three, never winning a title
6, Belgium (1900, 1908, 1912, 1920^{*}, 1924, 1936), United States (1924, 1932, 1972, 1984, 1988, 2008).
Most finishes in the top three, never finishing in the top two
2, Netherlands (1948, 1976).
Most finishes in the top four
17, Hungary (1928, 1932, 1936, 1948, 1952, 1956, 1960, 1964, 1968, 1972, 1976, 1980, 1996, 2000, 2004, 2008, 2020).
Most finishes in the top four, never winning a title
9, United States (1920, 1924, 1932^{*}, 1952, 1972, 1984^{*}, 1988, 1992, 2008).
Most finishes in the top four, never finishing in the top two
3, Netherlands (1908, 1948, 1976), West Germany^{†} (1972^{*}, 1984, 1988), Montenegro (2008, 2012, 2016).
Most finishes in the top four, never winning a medal
3, Montenegro (2008, 2012, 2016).
Fewest finishes in the top two, winning a title
1, France (1924^{*}).
Fewest finishes in the top three, winning a title
2, Spain (1992^{*}, 1996).
Fewest finishes in the top three, finishing in the top two
1, Serbia and Montenegro^{†} (2004), Greece (2020).
Fewest finishes in the top four, winning a title
3, Germany (1928, 1932, 1936^{*}), Croatia (1996, 2012, 2016).
Fewest finishes in the top four, finishing in the top two
1, Serbia and Montenegro^{†} (2004).
Fewest finishes in the top four, finishing in the top two, active team
2, Russia (2000, 2004), Greece (2004, 2020).
Fewest finishes in the top four, winning a medal
1, Unified Team^{†} (1992), FR Yugoslavia^{†} (2000), Serbia and Montenegro^{†} (2004).
Fewest finishes in the top four, winning a medal, active team
2, Russia (2000, 2004), Greece (2004, 2020).

==== Consecutive ====
Most consecutive titles won
3, Great Britain (1908^{*}–1912–1920), Hungary (2000–2004–2008), Serbia (2016-2020-2024).
Most consecutive second-place finishes
2, Belgium (1920^{*}–1924), Germany (1932–1936^{*}), Yugoslavia^{†} (1952–1956), United States (1984^{*}–1988).
Most consecutive third-place finishes
2, Serbia (2008–2012).
Most consecutive fourth-place finishes
3, Montenegro (2008–2012–2016).
Most consecutive finishes in the top two
6, Hungary (1928–1932–1936–1948–1952–1956).
Most consecutive finishes in the top three
12, Hungary (1928–1932–1936–1948–1952–1956–1960–1964–1968–1972–1976–1980).
Most consecutive finishes in the top four
12, Hungary (1928–1932–1936–1948–1952–1956–1960–1964–1968–1972–1976–1980).
Most consecutive appearances
19, Italy (1948–1952–1956–1960^{*}–1964–1968–1972–1976–1980–1984–1988–1992–1996–2000–2004–2008–2012–2016–2020).
Biggest improvement in position in consecutive tournaments
Did not participate/qualify, then won the title, Germany (1924–1928), Italy (1936–1948).

==== Gaps ====
Longest gap between successive titles
24 years, Hungary (1976–2000).
Longest gap between successive second-place finishes
36 years, Italy (1976–2012).
Longest gap between successive third-place finishes
44 years, Italy (1952–1996).
Longest gap between successive fourth-place finishes
40 years, United States (1952–1992).
Longest gap between successive appearances in the top two
24 years, Hungary (1976–2000).
Longest gap between successive appearances in the top three
40 years, United States (1932^{*}–1972).
Longest gap between successive appearances in the top four
40 years, Netherlands (1908–1948).
Longest gap between successive appearances
61 years, South Africa (1960–2020).

==== Debuting teams ====
Best finish by a debuting team
Champions, Great Britain (1900).
Best finish by a debuting team after 1900
Runners-up, Croatia (1996), Serbia and Montenegro^{†} (2004).
Worst finish by a debuting team
20th position, Portugal (1952).
Worst finish by a debuting team after 1972
12th position (last position), Iran (1976), South Korea (1988^{*}), Ukraine (1996), Slovakia (2000).

==== Host teams ====
Best finish by host team
Champions, Great Britain (1908^{*}), France (1924^{*}), Italy (1960^{*}), Soviet Union^{†} (1980^{*}).
Worst finish by host team
Did not participate/qualify, Finland (1952^{*}).
Worst finish by host team that participates in the tournament
13th position, Great Britain (1948^{*}).
Worst finish by host team that participates in the tournament after 1972
12th position (last position), South Korea (1988^{*}), China (2008^{*}), Great Britain (2012^{*}).
Best finish by last host team
Champions, Great Britain (1912), Spain (1996).
Worst finish by last host team
Did not participate/qualify, Netherlands (1932), Germany (1948), Canada (1980), Soviet Union^{†} (1984, withdrew), South Korea (1992), China (2012), Great Britain (2016), Brazil (2020).
Worst finish by last host team that participates in the tournament
15th position, Australia (1960).
Worst finish by last host team that participates in the tournament after 1972
9th position, Australia (2004).
Had its best performance as hosts
Champions, Great Britain (1908^{*}), France (1924^{*}), Italy (1960^{*}), Soviet Union^{†} (1980^{*}).
Runners-up, Sweden (1912^{*}), Belgium (1920^{*}), United States (1984^{*}).
9th position, Canada (1976^{*}).
12th position, South Korea (1988^{*}).
Had its worst performance as hosts
12th position, South Korea (1988^{*}), China (2008^{*}).
13th position, Great Britain (1948^{*}).
Had its worst performance as hosts after 1972
12th position (last position), South Korea (1988^{*}), China (2008^{*}), Great Britain (2012^{*}).

==== Defending champions ====
Best finish by defending champions
Champions, Great Britain (1912, 1920), Hungary (1936, 1956, 2004, 2008), Yugoslavia^{†} (1988), Serbia (2020).
Worst finish by defending champions
Did not participate/qualify, Soviet Union^{†} (1984, withdrew), Yugoslavia^{†} (1992, defunct).
Worst finish by defending champions that participates in the next tournament
8th position, Great Britain (1924), Soviet Union^{†} (1976).

==== Defending runners-up ====
Best finish by defending runners-up
Champions, Hungary (1932, 1952, 1976), Soviet Union^{†} (1972), Spain (1996), Yugoslavia^{†} (1968, 1984).
Worst finish by defending runners-up
Did not participate/qualify, Germany (1948), Serbia and Montenegro^{†} (2008, defunct).
Worst finish by defending runners-up that participates in the next tournament
8th position, Italy (1980), United States (2012).

==== Population ====
Most populated country, participant
China (2008^{*}), 1,324,655,000 (source)
Least populated country, participant
Iceland (1928), 104,000 (source)
Least populated country, participant, after 1972
Montenegro (2008), 616,000 (source)
Most populated country, hosts
China (2008^{*}), 1,324,655,000 (source)
Least populated country, hosts
Finland (1952^{*}), 4,090,000 (source)
Most populated country, champions
Soviet Union^{†} (1980^{*}), more than 260,000,000 (source)
Least populated country, champions
Croatia (2012), 4,267,000 (source)
Most populated country, runners-up
United States (2008), 304,375,000 (source)
Least populated country, runners-up
Croatia (1996), 4,516,000 (source)
Most populated country, third place
Unified Team^{†} (1992), more than 280,000,000 (source)
Least populated country, third place
Sweden (1908), 5,404,000 (source)
Most populated country, fourth place
United States (1992), 256,514,000 (source)
Least populated country, fourth place
Montenegro (2008), 616,000 (source)

== Confederation statistics ==
=== Number of teams by confederation ===
This is a summary of the total number of participating teams by confederation in each tournament. Last updated: 7 August 2021.

Legend

- – Forthcoming tournament

Confederation	00	04	08	12	20	24	28	32	36	48	52	56	60	64	68	72	76	80	84	88	92	96	00	04	08	12	16	20
Africa – CANA	—		—	—	—	—	—	—	—	1	2	—	2	1	1	—	—	—	—	—	—	—	—	1	—	—	—	1
Americas – UANA	—		—	—	2	1	2	2	2	4	4	1	3	2	4	4	3	1	3	1	2	1	1	1	2	1	2	1
Asia – AASF	—		—	—	—	—	—	1	1	1	1	1	1	1	1	1	1	—	2	2	—	—	1	1	1	1	1	2
Europe – LEN	7		4	6	10	12	12	2	13	11	13	7	9	8	9	10	7	10	6	8	9	11	9	8	8	9	8	7
Oceania – OSA	—		—	—	—	—	—	—	—	1	1	1	1	1	—	1	1	1	1	1	1	—	1	1	1	1	1	1
Total teams	7		4	6	12	13	14	5	16	18	21	10	16	13	15	16	12	12	12	12	12	12	12	12	12	12	12	12

=== Best performances by tournament ===
This is a summary of the best performances of each confederation in each tournament. Last updated: 8 August 2021.

Note: italic number in header means unofficial tournament was held.

Legend

- 1st – Champions
- 2nd – Runners-up
- 3rd – Third place
- 4th – Fourth place
- Q – Qualified for forthcoming tournament

Confederation	00	04	08	12	20	24	28	32	36	48	52	56	60	64	68	72	76	80	84	88	92	96	00	04	08	12	16	20	24
Africa – CANA	—		—	—	—	—	—	—	—	7th	10th	—	9th	12th	15th	—	—	—	—	—	—	—	—	12th	—	—	—	12th	—
Americas – UANA	—		—	—	4th	3rd	7th	3rd	9th	10th	4th	5th	7th	9th	5th	3rd	7th	5th	2nd	2nd	4th	7th	6th	7th	2nd	8th	10th	6th	3rd
Asia – AASF	—		—	—	—	—	—	4th	14th	12th	21st	10th	14th	11th	12th	15th	12th	—	9th	11th	—	—	9th	11th	12th	11th	12th	10th	11th
Europe – LEN	1st		1st	1st	1st	1st	1st	1st	1st	1st	1st	1st	1st	1st	1st	1st	1st	1st	1st	1st	1st	1st	1st	1st	1st	1st	1st	1st	1st
Oceania – OSA	—		—	—	—	—	—	—	—	18th	19th	9th	15th	10th	—	12th	11th	7th	5th	8th	5th	—	8th	9th	8th	7th	9th	9th	8th
Total teams	7		4	6	12	13	14	5	16	18	21	10	16	13	15	16	12	12	12	12	12	12	12	12	12	12	12	12	12

=== All-time best performances ===
This is a summary of the best performances of each confederation at the Olympics. Last updated: 8 August 2021.

Legend

- Year^{*} – As host team
- Team^{†} – Defunct team

Confederation	Best performance	Men's team
Africa – CANA	7th	Egypt (1948)
Americas – UANA	2nd	United States (1984^{*}, 1988, 2008)
Asia – AASF	4th	Japan (1932)
Europe – LEN	1st	Croatia (2012), France (1924^{*}), Germany (1928), Great Britain (1900, 1908^{*}, 1912, 1920), Hungary (1932, 1936, 1952, 1956, 1964, 1976, 2000, 2004, 2008), Italy (1948, 1960^{*}, 1992), Serbia (2016, 2020), Soviet Union^{†} (1972, 1980^{*}), Spain (1996), Yugoslavia^{†} (1968, 1984, 1988)
Oceania – OSA	5th	Australia (1984, 1992)

== See also ==
- Water polo at the Summer Olympics
- Lists of Olympic water polo records and statistics
  - List of men's Olympic water polo tournament records and statistics
  - List of women's Olympic water polo tournament records and statistics
  - List of Olympic champions in men's water polo
  - List of Olympic champions in women's water polo
  - National team appearances in the women's Olympic water polo tournament
  - List of players who have appeared in multiple men's Olympic water polo tournaments
  - List of players who have appeared in multiple women's Olympic water polo tournaments
  - List of Olympic medalists in water polo (men)
  - List of Olympic medalists in water polo (women)
  - List of men's Olympic water polo tournament top goalscorers
  - List of women's Olympic water polo tournament top goalscorers
  - List of men's Olympic water polo tournament goalkeepers
  - List of women's Olympic water polo tournament goalkeepers
  - List of Olympic venues in water polo
- FINA Water Polo World Rankings
- List of water polo world medalists
- Major achievements in water polo by nation

== Sources ==
=== Official Reports (IOC) ===
PDF documents in the LA84 Foundation Digital Library:

- Official Report of the 1896 Olympic Games (download, archive)
- Official Report of the 1900 Olympic Games (download, archive)
- Official Report of the 1904 Olympic Games (download, archive)
- Official Report of the 1908 Olympic Games (download, archive) (pp. 359–361)
- Official Report of the 1912 Olympic Games (download, archive) (pp. 1021–1024, 1031–1037)
- Official Report of the 1920 Olympic Games (download, archive) (p. 130)
- Official Report of the 1924 Olympic Games (download, archive) (pp. 439–440, 486–494)
- Official Report of the 1928 Olympic Games (download, archive) (pp. 746–757, 797–807)
- Official Report of the 1932 Olympic Games (download, archive) (pp. 619–623, 646–652)
- Official Report of the 1936 Olympic Games, v.2 (download, archive) (pp. 345–356)
- Official Report of the 1948 Olympic Games (download, archive) (pp. 537–540, 640–647)
- Official Report of the 1952 Olympic Games (download, archive) (pp. 600–608)
- Official Report of the 1956 Olympic Games (download, archive) (pp. 592–594, 624–627)
- Official Report of the 1960 Olympic Games (download, archive) (pp. 552–555, 617–634)
- Official Report of the 1964 Olympic Games, v.2 (download, archive) (pp. 682–698)
- Official Report of the 1968 Olympic Games, v.3 (download, archive) (pp. 449–466, 811–826)
- Official Report of the 1972 Olympic Games, v.3 (download, archive) (pp. 331, 353–365)
- Official Report of the 1976 Olympic Games, v.3 (download, archive) (pp. 446–447, 484–497)
- Official Report of the 1980 Olympic Games, v.3 (download, archive) (pp. 458, 495–510)
- Official Report of the 1984 Olympic Games, v.2 (download, archive) (pp. 528–534)
- Official Report of the 1988 Olympic Games, v.2 (download, archive) (pp. 590–598)
- Official Report of the 1992 Olympic Games, v.5 (download, archive) (pp. 354, 386–400)
- Official Report of the 1996 Olympic Games, v.3 (download, archive) (pp. 56–73)

=== Official Results Books (IOC) ===
PDF documents in the LA84 Foundation Digital Library:

- Official Results Book – 2000 Olympic Games – Water Polo (download, archive)
- Official Results Book – 2004 Olympic Games – Water Polo (download, archive)
- Official Results Book – 2008 Olympic Games – Water Polo (download, archive)

PDF documents on the FINA website:

- Official Results Book – 2012 Olympic Games – Diving, Swimming, Synchronised Swimming, Water Polo (archive) (pp. 284–507)

PDF documents in the Olympic World Library:

- Official Results Book – 2016 Olympic Games – Water Polo (archive)

PDF documents on the International Olympic Committee website:

- Official Results Book – 2020 Olympic Games – Water Polo (archive)
- Official Results Book – 2024 Olympic Games – Water Polo

=== Official Reports (FINA) ===
PDF documents on the FINA website:

- HistoFINA – Water polo medalists and statistics (as of September 2019) (archive) (pp. 4–13)
- 1870–2020 | 150 years of Water Polo – Evolution of its rules (archive)

=== Official website (IOC) ===
Water polo on the International Olympic Committee website:

- Water polo
- Men's water polo

=== Olympedia ===
Water polo on the Olympedia website:

- Water polo Archived 2021-12-28 at the Wayback Machine
- Men's water polo
- Athlete count for water polo
- Water polo venues
- Water polo at the 1900 Summer Olympics (men's tournament)
- Water polo at the 1904 Summer Olympics (men's tournament)
- Water polo at the 1908 Summer Olympics (men's tournament)
- Water polo at the 1912 Summer Olympics (men's tournament)
- Water polo at the 1920 Summer Olympics (men's tournament)
- Water polo at the 1924 Summer Olympics (men's tournament)
- Water polo at the 1928 Summer Olympics (men's tournament)
- Water polo at the 1932 Summer Olympics (men's tournament)
- Water polo at the 1936 Summer Olympics (men's tournament)
- Water polo at the 1948 Summer Olympics (men's tournament)
- Water polo at the 1952 Summer Olympics (men's tournament)
- Water polo at the 1956 Summer Olympics (men's tournament)
- Water polo at the 1960 Summer Olympics (men's tournament)
- Water polo at the 1964 Summer Olympics (men's tournament)
- Water polo at the 1968 Summer Olympics (men's tournament)
- Water polo at the 1972 Summer Olympics (men's tournament)
- Water polo at the 1976 Summer Olympics (men's tournament)
- Water polo at the 1980 Summer Olympics (men's tournament)
- Water polo at the 1984 Summer Olympics (men's tournament)
- Water polo at the 1988 Summer Olympics (men's tournament)
- Water polo at the 1992 Summer Olympics (men's tournament)
- Water polo at the 1996 Summer Olympics (men's tournament)
- Water polo at the 2000 Summer Olympics (men's tournament)
- Water polo at the 2004 Summer Olympics (men's tournament)
- Water polo at the 2008 Summer Olympics (men's tournament)
- Water polo at the 2012 Summer Olympics (men's tournament)
- Water polo at the 2016 Summer Olympics (men's tournament)
- Water polo at the 2020 Summer Olympics (men's tournament)

=== Sports Reference ===
Water polo on the Sports Reference website:

- Country Medal Leaders & Athlete Medal Leaders (1900–2016) (archived)
- Men's water polo (1900–2016) (archived)
- Water polo at the 1900 Summer Games (men's tournament) (archived)
- Water polo at the 1904 Summer Games (men's tournament) (archived)
- Water polo at the 1908 Summer Games (men's tournament) (archived)
- Water polo at the 1912 Summer Games (men's tournament) (archived)
- Water polo at the 1920 Summer Games (men's tournament) (archived)
- Water polo at the 1924 Summer Games (men's tournament) (archived)
- Water polo at the 1928 Summer Games (men's tournament) (archived)
- Water polo at the 1932 Summer Games (men's tournament) (archived)
- Water polo at the 1936 Summer Games (men's tournament) (archived)
- Water polo at the 1948 Summer Games (men's tournament) (archived)
- Water polo at the 1952 Summer Games (men's tournament) (archived)
- Water polo at the 1956 Summer Games (men's tournament) (archived)
- Water polo at the 1960 Summer Games (men's tournament) (archived)
- Water polo at the 1964 Summer Games (men's tournament) (archived)
- Water polo at the 1968 Summer Games (men's tournament) (archived)
- Water polo at the 1972 Summer Games (men's tournament) (archived)
- Water polo at the 1976 Summer Games (men's tournament) (archived)
- Water polo at the 1980 Summer Games (men's tournament) (archived)
- Water polo at the 1984 Summer Games (men's tournament) (archived)
- Water polo at the 1988 Summer Games (men's tournament) (archived)
- Water polo at the 1992 Summer Games (men's tournament) (archived)
- Water polo at the 1996 Summer Games (men's tournament) (archived)
- Water polo at the 2000 Summer Games (men's tournament) (archived)
- Water polo at the 2004 Summer Games (men's tournament) (archived)
- Water polo at the 2008 Summer Games (men's tournament) (archived)
- Water polo at the 2012 Summer Games (men's tournament) (archived)
- Water polo at the 2016 Summer Games (men's tournament) (archived)
- Water polo at the 2020 Summer Games (men's tournament) (archived)

=== Todor66 ===
Water polo on the Todor66 website:

- Water polo at the Summer Games
- Water polo at the 1900 Summer Olympics (men's tournament)
- Water polo at the 1904 Summer Olympics (men's tournament)
- Water polo at the 1908 Summer Olympics (men's tournament)
- Water polo at the 1912 Summer Olympics (men's tournament)
- Water polo at the 1920 Summer Olympics (men's tournament)
- Water polo at the 1924 Summer Olympics (men's tournament)
- Water polo at the 1928 Summer Olympics (men's tournament)
- Water polo at the 1932 Summer Olympics (men's tournament)
- Water polo at the 1936 Summer Olympics (men's tournament)
- Water polo at the 1948 Summer Olympics (men's tournament)
- Water polo at the 1952 Summer Olympics (men's tournament)
- Water polo at the 1956 Summer Olympics (men's tournament)
- Water polo at the 1960 Summer Olympics (men's tournament)
- Water polo at the 1964 Summer Olympics (men's tournament)
- Water polo at the 1968 Summer Olympics (men's tournament, men's qualification)
- Water polo at the 1972 Summer Olympics (men's tournament, men's qualification)
- Water polo at the 1976 Summer Olympics (men's tournament, men's European qualification)
- Water polo at the 1980 Summer Olympics (men's tournament, men's European qualification, men's world qualification)
- Water polo at the 1984 Summer Olympics (men's tournament, men's qualification)
- Water polo at the 1988 Summer Olympics (men's tournament, men's qualification)
- Water polo at the 1992 Summer Olympics (men's tournament, men's qualification)
- Water polo at the 1996 Summer Olympics (men's tournament, men's qualification)
- Water polo at the 2000 Summer Olympics (men's tournament, men's qualification)
- Water polo at the 2004 Summer Olympics (men's tournament, men's qualification)
- Water polo at the 2008 Summer Olympics (men's tournament, men's qualification)
- Water polo at the 2012 Summer Olympics (men's tournament, men's qualification)
- Water polo at the 2016 Summer Olympics (men's tournament, men's qualification)
- Water polo at the 2020 Summer Olympics (men's tournament, men's qualification)
- Water polo at the 2024 Summer Olympics (men's tournament, men's qualification)
