= Tunisia men's national water polo team =

Tunisia
- FINA code: TUN
- Nickname(s): نسور قرطاج (Eagles of Carthage)
- Association: Tunisian Swimming Federation
- Confederation: CANA (Africa)
- Head coach: Moez Yangui

First international
- Tunisia ?–? ? (Tunis, Tunisia; - - 2001)

Biggest win
- Tunisia 34–3 Kenya (Kuwait, Kuwait; 4 April 2009)

Biggest defeat
- Tunisia 6–29 Colombia (Kuwait, Kuwait; 2 May 2007)

World League
- Appearances: 2 (first in 2008)
- Best result: Preliminary round (2008, 2010)

FINA Development Trophy
- Appearances: 6 (first in 2007)
- Best result: 4th place (2017)

Media
- Website: ftnatation.tn

The Tunisia men's national water polo team is the representative for Tunisia in international men's water polo.

== Results ==
=== Olympic Games ===
Year	Position
1936 to 2020 Tokyo	Did not compete
(France) 2024 Paris	Future event
(United States) 2028 Los Angeles	Future event

=== World Championship ===
Year	Position
1973 to 2019 Gwangju	Did not compete
(Japan) 2021 Fukuoka	Future event
(Qatar) 2023 Doha	Future event

=== World Cup ===
Year	Position
1979 to 2018 Berlin	Did not compete

=== FINA World League ===
Year	Round	Position
Patras, 2002 to Berlin, 2007	Did not compete	
(Italy) Genoa, 2008	Preliminary round	
(Montenegro) Podgorica, 2009	Did not compete	
(Serbia) Niš, 2010	Preliminary round	
Florence, 2011 to Tbilisi, 2021	Did not compete	
Total	YQ / YP: 0/2	

=== Mediterranean Games ===
Year	Position
1959 to 1997 Bari	Did not compete
(Tunisia) 2001 Tunis	8th
2005 Almeria to 2018 Tarragona	Did not compete
(Algeria) 2021 Oran	Future event

=== FINA Development Trophy ===
Year	Round	Position
Kuwait City, 2007		10th
Kuwait City, 2009		11th
(Saudi Arabia) Dammam, 2011		7th
Kuwait City, 2013		8th
(Iran) Tehran, 2015		8th
(Malta) Gżira, 2017		4th
Singapore, 2019	Did not compete	
Total	YQ / YP: 6/7	

== Team ==
=== Current squad ===
Roster for the Gżira, 2017 .

Head coach:

No	Name	Pos.	L/R	Date of birth	Height	Weight	Caps	Club
	Aimen KEDIDI							
	Salim BOUALLEGUE							
	Bechir CHOUIKWA							
	Adem FELLAH							
	Nabil BEN HAJKHALIFA							
	Mohamed KHALFET							
	Nadim FEKIH							
	Nadhem ESSAIED							
	Karin GHOMRASNI							
	Taha BEN SLIMAN							
	Mehdi FERGANT							
	Amanallah SGHAIER							
