= Ireland men's national water polo team =

Men's national water polo team representing Ireland

Ireland
- FINA code: IRL
- Association: Swim Ireland
- Confederation: LEN (Europe)
- Head coach: Goran Sablic
- Team manager: Eamon Caulfield
- Captain: Aden Conlan
- Most caps: Patrick Brown
- Home venue: National Aquatic Centre

Olympic Games
- Appearances: 2 (first in 1924)
- Best result: 9th place (1924)

Media
- Website: https://www.irelandwaterpolo.ie

The Ireland men's national water polo team represents the island of Ireland in water polo. The Irish Water Polo Association (IWPA) was founded in 1964 and is affiliated to Swim Ireland.

== History ==
The rules of water polo were originally developed by William Wilson in the mid-nineteenth century. The game was originally played in rivers and lakes in England and Scotland. Between 1890 and 1900, the game developed in Europe using British rules, but a different game was being played in the United States.

During the nineteenth and twentieth centuries, the four Home Nations — England, Ireland, Scotland, and Wales — contested regular internationals against each other. Ireland were often outclassed, losing every match against England from 1895 to 1910. However, Noel Purcell won a gold medal on the Great Britain team at the 1920 Olympic water polo tournament.

In 1922, the Irish Free State seceded from the United Kingdom and the Olympic Council of Ireland joined the International Olympic Committee. Purcell captained Ireland at the 1924 Olympics. Ireland had a bye in the first round when Austria pulled out. In the second round, they lost 4–2 against Czechoslovakia. At the 1924 Tailteann Games, Ireland beat a team representing England. In the 1928 Olympic tournament, Ireland lost its only match 11–1 to Belgium. The expense of travel to Los Angeles ruled out participating in the 1932 tournament, and Ireland boycotted the 1936 Games in a dispute over Northern Ireland.

Ireland has not competed in the Olympics since 1928, and has never qualified for the World Championships. Although Home International matches continued into the 1960s, the transition to higher-specification indoor swimming pools was long delayed in Ireland. The outdoor sea baths at Clontarf and Blackrock fell into disuse. The IWPA was established in 1964 and the first pool to meet FINA regulations for length, breadth, and depth opened in 2002.

== Results ==
=== 2007 European 'B' Championships ===
Qualifying Group 'C', in Kotor, Montenegro:

- 16 March: lost 2–25 v. Montenegro (Note: Montenegro, having secured independence from Serbia, had only just joined LEN and so started at the bottom of the rankings. Having won the 2007 B final, they beat Serbia in the final of the 2008 A Championship.)
- 17 March: won 10–9 v. Switzerland
- 18 March: won 10–8 v. Austria

Finals, in Manchester:

- Group B:
  - 8 July : lost 5–33 v. France
  - 9 July : lost 3–19 v. Ukraine
  - 10 July : lost 5–20 v. Great Britain
  - 11 July : lost 9–15 v. Israel
  - 12 July : lost 5–16 v. Poland
- Classification playoff:
  - 13 July : lost 6–13 v. Malta

=== Since 2008 ===
In February 2009, Ireland played a five-nation tournament in Denmark, losing all four matches.

In October 2019, Ireland competed in the 2019 FINA Water Polo Challengers' Cup, finishing 2nd in their group winning three out of the four games. Ireland lost the bronze-medal match to Indonesia 14-9 and therefore finishing fourth.

== Results summary ==
Olympic Games:

- 1924 — 9th
- 1928 — 14th
- 1932–2016 — Did not enter.

Tailteann Games

- 1924 — 1st

European Championship:

- 2007: 12th ('B' Championships)

FINA Challengers’ Cup:

- 2019 — 4th
