= Luxembourg men's national water polo team =

Men's national water polo team representing Luxembourg

Luxembourg
- FINA code: LUX
- Association: Fédération Luxembourgeoise de Natation et de Sauvetage
- Confederation: LEN (Europe)

Olympic Games
- Appearances: 1 (first in 1928)
- Best result: 11th place (1928)

The Luxembourg men's national water polo team is the representative for Luxembourg in international men's water polo.

== Results ==
=== Olympic Games ===
- 1928 — 11th place

=== 2019 EU Nations Water Polo Cup – Men Tournament (Brno) (Czech Republic) ===
- Luxembourg – Switzerland – 1:20 (0:8 / 0:4 / 0:3 / 1:5) – LUX Goals: Rondeau J. (1)
- Luxembourg – USA – 2:28 (1:9 / 0:6 / 0:8 / 1:8) – LUX Goals: Soriot N. (1), Jacquet E. (1)
- Lithuania – Luxembourg – 22:6 (2:1 / 6:3 / 4:2 / 10:0) – LUX Goals: Clemencin S. (2), Rondeau J. (2), Ricci P. (1), Jacquet E. (1)
- Austria – Luxembourg – 25:4 (12:3 / 6:0 / 3:0 / 4:1) – LUX Goals: Clemencin S (2), Rondeau J. (1), Jacquet E. (1)
- England – Luxembourg – 23:5 (9:1 / 4:1 / 6:1 / 4:2) – LUX Goals: Kalan G. (3), Charlé E. (1), Rondeau J. (1)
- Singapore – Luxembourg – 24:4 (5:1 / 4:1 / 9:2 / 6:0) – LUX Goals: Clemencin S. (2), Kalan G. (2)
- Wales – Luxembourg – 19:9 (3:4 / 2:1 / 7:4 / 7:0) – LUX Goals: Kalan G. (6), Charlé E. (2), Rondeau J. (1)

== Team ==
=== Current squad ===
Roster for the 2019 EU Nations Water Polo Cup – Men Tournament (Brno).

Head coach: Bernard Pollak Luxembourg men's national water polo team

No	Name	Date of birth	Position	L/R	Club
1	Pascal Goujon	7 January 1975 (age 51)	Goalkeeper	L	(Luxembourg) CN Diekirch
2	Sidney Clémencin	24 March 1989 (age 37)	All-round	R	(Luxembourg) CN Diekirch
3	Jérémy Rondeau	24 March 1984 (age 42)	All-round	R	(Luxembourg) CN Diekirch
4	José Nunez	8 September 1984 (age 41)	Centre forward	R	Swimming Luxembourg
5	Eric Charlé	30 May 1995 (age 30)	Centre forward	R	(France) Grand Longwy Water Polo
6	Nicolas Soriot	2 November 1979 (age 46)	Field player	R	(Luxembourg) CN Diekirch
7	Luca Raponi	18 March 1979 (age 47)	All-round	R	(Luxembourg) CN Diekirch
8	Pierre-Louis Ricci	11 July 1991 (age 34)	All-round	R	(Luxembourg) CN Diekirch
9	Gasper Kalan	4 November 1989 (age 36)	All-round	R	(Luxembourg) CN Diekirch
10	Steven Spielmann	22 May 1987 (age 38)	All-round	R	(Luxembourg) CN Diekirch
11	Pir Castiglia (C)	5 August 1985 (age 40)	Wing	R	(Luxembourg) CN Diekirch
12	Samuel Baumislovski	9 May 1994 (age 31)	All-round	R	Swimming Luxembourg
13	Guy Lambert	27 December 1967 (age 58)	Goalkeeper	R	(Luxembourg) CN Diekirch
14	Enzo Jacquet	15 June 2003 (age 22)	Wing	R	(Luxembourg) CN Diekirch
15	Arnaud Constant	29 June 1977 (age 48)	Centre	R	(Luxembourg) CN Diekirch
16	Nicolas Ehrismann	20 January 2003 (age 23)	Centre forward	R	(France) SC Thionville
