= Uruguay men's national water polo team =

Men's national water polo team representing Uruguay

Uruguay
- FINA code: URU
- Association: Uruguay Swimming Federation
- Confederation: UANA (Americas)
- Head coach: Jorge Remersaro

Olympic Games
- Appearances: 2 (first in 1936)
- Best result: 13th place (1936)

The Uruguay men's national water polo team is the representative for Uruguay in international men's water polo.

== Results ==
=== Olympic Games ===
- 1936 — 13th place
- 1948 — 16th place

=== FINA Development Trophy ===
- 2007 — 6th place
- 2009 — 7th place
- 2013 — 6th place
- 2015 — (silver) Silver Medal
- 2017 - (gold) Gold Medal
