= Water polo in Spain =

The Spanish water polo league is divided into divisions. The top teams play in the División de Honor. In each division, a team plays all other teams twice, once at home and once away.

The Spanish league teams compete in Europe under the Ligue Européenne de Natation, most notably in the LEN Euroleague and LEN Cup, and previously in the LEN Cup Winners' Cup. The teams also compete in a domestic cup competition each year, called the Copa del Rey. The winners of the División de Honor play against the winners of the Copa del Rey in the Supercopa de España de Waterpolo (Super Cup).

== Current hierarchical divisional breakdowns ==
- División de Honor (12 teams)
- Primera División (12 teams)
- Segunda División (12 teams)

== Current female hierarchical divisional breakdowns ==
- División de Honor Femenina (12 teams)
- Primera División Femenina (6 teams)

For a list of teams, see List of waterpolo clubs in Spain

The Spain women's national water polo team represents the whole country.

== Others Competitions ==
- Copa del Rey de Waterpolo
- Supercopa de España de Waterpolo
- Copa de la Reina de Waterpolo
