= Asian Water Polo Clubs Championships =

The Asian Water Polo Clubs Championships are the premier Asian water polo club competitions run by the Asia Swimming Federation.

== Summary ==
Year	Host	Champion	Runner-up	Third place
1999	(Iran); Tehran	(Kazakhstan); Dynamo Almaty	(Iran); Sorb & Rouy Zanjan	(Saudi Arabia); Al-Ittihad
2000	(Malaysia); Kuala Lumpur	(Kazakhstan); Rahat Almaty	(Iran); Niroo Ahvaz	(Uzbekistan); MHSK Tashkent
2002	(Thailand); Chiang Mai	(Kazakhstan); Almaty	(Iran); Bargh Mantaghe'ei Gilan	(Kuwait); Al-Qadsia
2003	(Iran); Tehran	(Iran); Zob Ahan Isfahan	(Kuwait); Al-Arabi	(Saudi Arabia); Al-Ahli
2007	Kuwait City	(Saudi Arabia); Al-Ittihad	(Iran); Naft & Gaz Gachsaran	(Saudi Arabia); Al-Ahli
2008	Kuwait City	Iran Tose'eh Karaj	(China); Guangdong	Al-Kuwait
2009	(Saudi Arabia); Dammam	(Saudi Arabia); Al-Ittihad	(Saudi Arabia); Al-Qadisiyah	(Iran); Naft Omidiyeh
2010	(Iran); Tehran	(Iran); Azad University Tehran	(Iran); Naft & Gaz Omidiyeh	(Kuwait); Al-Arabi
2013	Kuwait City	(Kazakhstan); Astana	(Saudi Arabia); Al-Ittihad	(Kuwait); Al-Qadsia
2014	(Iran); Tehran	(Kazakhstan); Astana	(Iran); Zarin-Maadan Zanjan	(Saudi Arabia); Al-Qadisiyah
2017	(Thailand); Bangkok	(Kazakhstan); Astana	(Iran); Saipa Tehran	(Iran); Azad University Tehran
2025	(Iran); Tehran			

== Titles by country ==
Rank	Nation	Gold	Silver	Bronze	Total
1	Kazakhstan	6	0	0	6
2	Iran	3	7	2	12
3	Saudi Arabia	2	2	4	8
4	Kuwait	0	1	4	5
5	China	0	1	0	1
6	Uzbekistan	0	0	1	1
Totals (6 entries)		11	11	11	33
