= Iceland men's national water polo team =

Men's national water polo team representing Iceland

Iceland
- FINA code: ISL
- Association: Icelandic Swimming Association
- Confederation: LEN (Europe)

Olympic Games
- Appearances: 1 (first in 1936)
- Best result: 15th place (1936)

The Iceland men's national water polo team (Icelandic: Islenska karlalandsliðað í vatnsleikjum) is the representative for Iceland in international men's water polo.

== Results ==
=== Olympic Games ===
- 1936 — 15th place
