= Goulden Cup =

Men's water polo championship in Canada

The Goulden Cup is the trophy awarded annually to the men's national water polo club champions in Canada. The trophy has been competed for since 1907, making it one of the oldest national championship trophies in Canada, being two years older than the Allan Cup (1909) and three years older than the Mann Cup (1910). The current champions are the Toronto Golden Jets.

== Champions ==
Year	Location	Date	Winner	Score		Runner up
1907			Montreal Swimming Club			
1908			Montreal Swimming Club			
1909			Montreal Swimming Club			
1910			Montreal Swimming Club			
1911			Montreal Swimming Club			
1912			Montreal Swimming Club			
1913			Montreal Swimming Club			
1914			Montreal Amateur Athletic Association			
1915			Montreal Amateur Athletic Association			
1916			Montreal Swimming Club			
1917			Montreal Amateur Athletic Association			
1918			Montreal Swimming Club			
1919			Montreal Swimming Club			
1920			McGill University Swimming Club			
1921			Montreal Amateur Athletic Association			
1922			Montreal Swimming Club			
1923			McGill University Swimming Club			
1924			Montreal Swimming Club			
1925			Montreal Amateur Athletic Association			
1926			Montreal Amateur Athletic Association			
1927			Montreal Amateur Athletic Association			
1928			Montreal Amateur Athletic Association			
1929			Montreal Amateur Athletic Association			
1930			Montreal Amateur Athletic Association			
1931			Columbus Swimming Club			
1932			Montreal Y.M.H.A			
1933			Montreal Y.M.H.A			
1934			Montreal Y.M.H.A			
1935			Montreal Y.M.H.A			
1936			Montreal Y.M.H.A			
1937			Montreal Y.M.H.A			
1938			Montreal Y.M.H.A			
1939			Montreal Y.M.H.A			
1940	Not contested due to World War II					
1941	Not contested due to World War II					
1942	Not contested due to World War II					
1943	Not contested due to World War II					
1944	Not contested due to World War II					
1945	Not contested due to World War II					
1946	Not contested due to World War II					
1947			Hamilton Aquatic Club			
1948			Hamilton Aquatic Club			
1949			Hamilton Aquatic Club			
1950			Hamilton Aquatic Club			
1951			Hamilton Aquatic Club			
1952			Hamilton Aquatic Club			
1953			Hamilton Aquatic Club			
1954			Hamilton Aquatic Club			
1955			Hamilton Aquatic Club			
1956			Hamilton Aquatic Club			
1957			Hamilton Aquatic Club			
1958			Hungaria Sport Club (Toronto)			
1959			Toronto Water Polo Club			
1960			Toronto Water Polo Club			
1961			Toronto Water Polo Club			
1962			Toronto Water Polo Club			
1963			Toronto Water Polo Club			
1964	Gravenhurst, Ontario		Toronto Water Polo Club			
1965	Edmonton, Alberta		Montreal Concordia E.E.B.C.			
1966			Montreal Concordia E.E.B.C.			
1967			Montreal E.E.B.C			
1968			Montreal Y.M.H.A. Snowdon Blues			
1969			Quebec All-Stars			
1970			Quebec All-Stars			
1971			Hamilton Aquatic Club			
1972			Hamilton Aquatic Club			
1973			Montreal			
1974			Hamilton Aquatic Club			
1975			Montreal			
1976			Hamilton Aquatic Club			
1977			Hamilton Aquatic Club			
1978			Hamilton Aquatic Club			
1979			Hamilton Aquatic Club			
1980			Hamilton Aquatic Club			
1981			Hamilton Aquatic Club			
1982			Vancouver			
1983			No Winner declared			
1984			Sainte-Foy Hydres			
1985			Sainte-Foy Hydres			
1986			Toronto Golden Jets			
1987			Sainte-Foy Hydres			
1988			Vancouver Reign			
1989			Vancouver Reign			
1990			Vancouver Reign			
1991			Club Aquatique de Montréal			
1992			Vancouver Reign			
1993			Vancouver Reign			
1994			Toronto Phantoms			
1995			Calgary Renegades			
1996			Club Aquatique de Montréal			
1997			Club Aquatique de Montréal			
1998			Calgary Renegades			
1999			Vancouver Pacific Storm			
2000	(Quebec) Montréal, Québec		Vancouver Pacific Storm	9	5	Club Aquatique de Montréal
2001	Calgary, Alberta	June 10	Vancouver Pacific Storm	9	7	Calgary Renegades
2002	(Quebec) Montréal, Québec	May 26	Vancouver Pacific Storm			Dollard-des-Ormeaux
2003	Calgary, Alberta	June 1	Vancouver Pacific Storm			Calgary Torpedoes
2004	(Quebec) Montréal, Québec	June 6	Vancouver Pacific Storm			Club Aquatique de Montréal
2005	(Quebec) Montréal, Québec	June 5	Calgary Torpedoes			Club Aquatique de Montréal
2006	(Quebec) Montréal, Québec	May 21	Regina Squids	15	8	Hamilton Aquatic Club
2007	Calgary, Alberta	June 3	Hamilton Aquatic Club			Dollard-des-Ormeaux
2008	(Quebec) Sainte-Foy, Québec	June 15	Club Aquatique de Montréal			Dollard-des-Ormeaux
2009	Surrey, British Columbia	May 10	Dollard-des-Ormeaux	7	4	Calgary Torpedoes
2010	(Quebec) Montréal, Québec	May 30	Dollard-des-Ormeaux	11	7	Club Aquatique de Montréal
2011	Langley, British Columbia	May 1	Calgary Bowness Monster	8	7	Club Aquatique de Montréal
2012	(Quebec) Montréal, Québec	March 25	Calgary Bowness Monster	12	6	Dollard-des-Ormeaux
2013	Saskatoon, Saskatchewan	April 7	Club Aquatique de Montréal	7	6	Calgary Torpedoes
2014	Calgary, Alberta		Toronto Golden Jets			
2015	(Quebec) Montréal, Québec	March 29	Toronto Golden Jets	14	4	York Mavericks
2016	(Quebec) Montréal, Québec	April 3	Club Aquatique de Montréal	15	12	Toronto Golden Jets
2017	Markham, Ontario	April 2	Toronto Golden Jets	4	3	York Mavericks
2018	(Quebec) Montréal, Québec	March 25	Dollard-des-Ormeaux	14	13	Ottawa Titans
2019	Markham, Ontario	March 31	Dollard-des-Ormeaux	6	5	Toronto Golden Jets
2020	(Quebec) Montréal, Québec					
