= Austria men's national water polo team =

Men's national water polo team representing Austria

Austria
- FINA code: AUT
- Association: Österreichischer Schwimmverband
- Confederation: LEN (Europe)

Olympic Games
- Appearances: 3 (first in 1912)
- Best result: 4th place (1912)

The Austria men's national water polo team is the representative for Austria in international men's water polo.

== Results ==
=== Olympic Games ===
- 1912 — 4th place
- 1936 — 6th place
- 1952 — 13th place
