= Water polo at the Summer Olympics =

- IOC Code: WPO
- Governing body: World Aquatics
- Events: 2 (men: 1; women: 1)

Summer Olympics
- 1896; 1900; 1904; 1908; 1912; 1920; 1924; 1928; 1932; 1936; 1948; 1952; 1956; 1960; 1964; 1968; 1972; 1976; 1980; 1984; 1988; 1992; 1996; 2000; 2004; 2008; 2012; 2016; 2020; 2024; 2028; 2032
- Medalists; men; women
- Overall statistics (men • women); Champions (men • women); Team appearances (men • women); Player appearances (men • women); Top goalscorers (men • women); Goalkeepers (men • women); Flag bearers and oath takers Venues

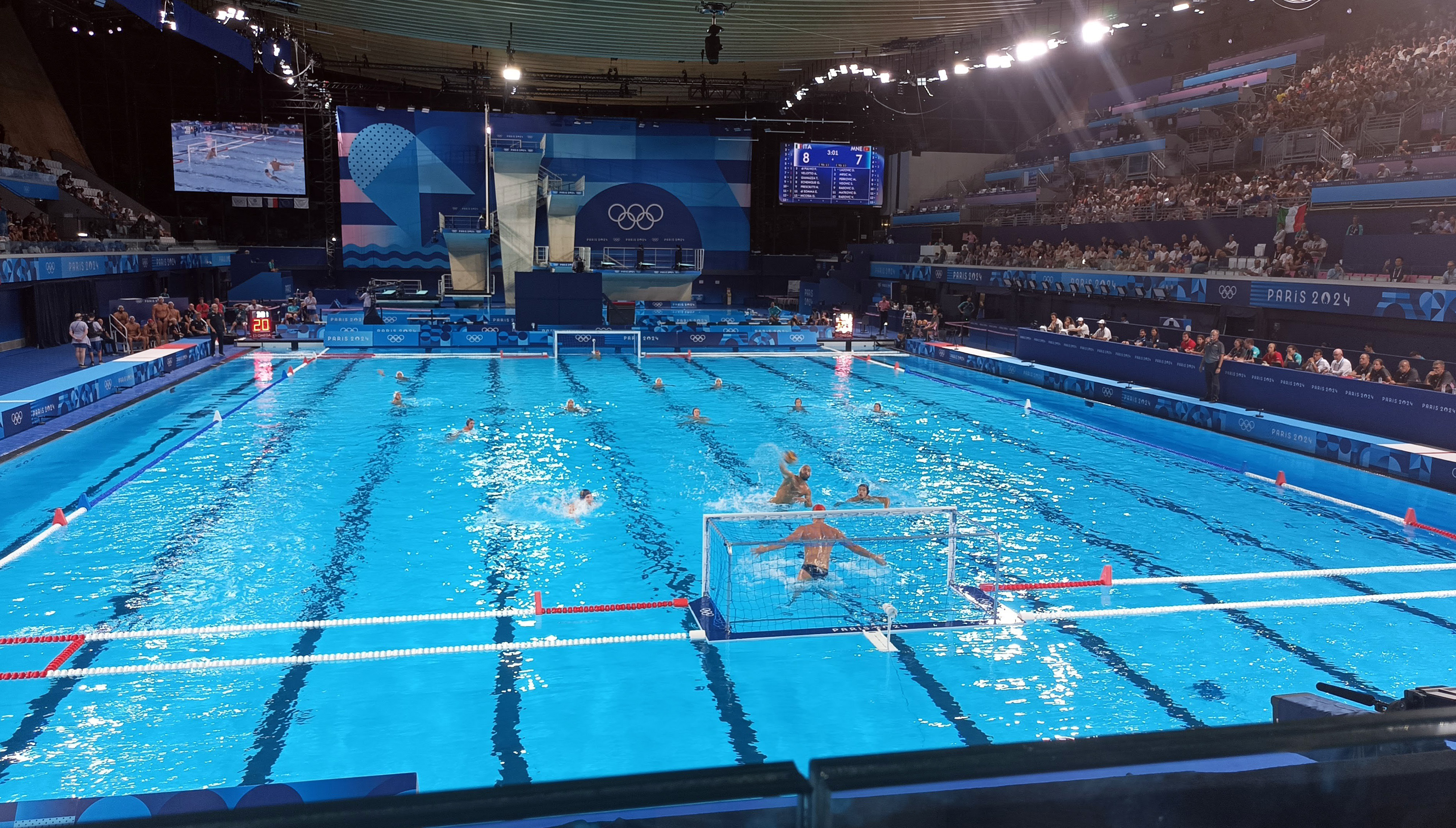
Water Polo at the 2024 Olympics (Italy v. Montenegro)

Water polo at the 2004 Summer Olympics

Water polo has been part of the Summer Olympics program since the second games, in 1900. A women's water polo tournament was introduced for the 2000 Summer Olympics. Hungary has been the most successful country in men's tournament, while the United States is the only team to win multiple times at the women's tournament since its introduction. Italy was the first to win both the men's and women's water polo tournaments. Water polo is considered a disciplne of the Olympic sport of aquatics alongside artistic swimming, diving, marathon swimming and swimming.

== History ==
The history of water polo as a team sport began in mid-19th century England and Scotland, where water sports were a feature of county fairs and festivals. Water polo has been included in every Summer Olympic Games as a men's competition sport, except 1896. Women's water polo made its debut in the Summer Olympics in 2000.

=== Beginnings ===
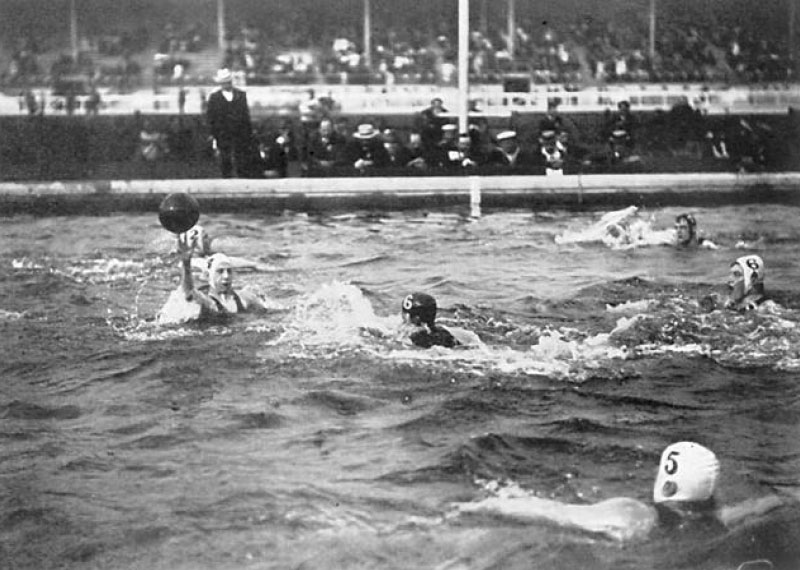
Water polo final at the 1908 London Olympics

Men's water polo was among the first team sports introduced at the modern Olympic Games in 1900. Seven European teams from four countries, including four from the host nation France, took part in the competition. The British team was the inaugural champion.

At the 1904 Summer Olympics, a water polo tournament was contested, three club teams of seven players each entered. A German team tried to enter, but its entry was refused because the players did not play for the same club. The event took place in a pond in Forest Park, the location of both the Olympics and the World's Fair. Previously, the International Olympic Committee and International Swimming Federation (FINA) considered the water polo event at the 1904 Olympics as a demonstration sport. However, in July 2021, after accepting the recommendation of Olympic historian Bill Mallon, the IOC recognized water polo along with several others as an official sport of the 1904 Olympic program. Water polo was not played at the 1906 Olympics.

From 1908 to 1920, the Great Britain men's national water polo team won three consecutive gold medals at the Olympics, becoming the first water polo team to have an Olympic winning streak (winning three or more Olympic titles in a row).

=== Hungarian dominance ===
Hungary men's national water polo team has participated in 22 of 27 Olympic tournaments, with fifteen Olympic medals (nine gold, three silver and three bronze). From 1928 to 1980, the Hungarians won twelve consecutive medals in water polo. Twenty years later, the team won three golds in a row between 2000 and 2008, becoming the second team to have an Olympic winning streak in water polo.

==== Blood in the Water match ====
The most famous water polo match in Olympic history often referred to as the Blood in the Water match, was a 1956 Summer Olympics semi-final match between Hungary and the Soviet Union, played in Melbourne on 6 December 1956. As the athletes left for the games, the Hungarian revolution began, and the Soviet army crushed the uprising. The match was bloody and violent. The Hungarians defeated the Soviets 4–0 before the game was called off in the final minute to prevent angry Hungarians in the crowd reacting to Soviet player Valentin Prokopov punching Hungarian player Ervin Zádor. Pictures of Zádor's injuries were published around the world, leading to the "Blood in the Water" moniker.

The Hungarians went on to win the Olympic gold medal by defeating Yugoslavia 2–1 in the final.

=== Addition of women's program ===
Women's water polo became an Olympic sport at the 2000 Sydney Olympics. Six nations competed in the women's tournament with home team Australia winning the gold medal over the United States.

From 2012 to 2020, the United States women's team won three consecutive gold medals at the Summer Olympics, becoming the first women's water polo team to have an Olympic winning streak.

== Geography ==
Water polo is now popular in many countries around the world, notably in Europe (particularly in Croatia, France, Germany, Greece, Hungary, Italy, Malta, Montenegro, the Netherlands, Romania, Russia, Serbia and Spain), Australia, Brazil, Canada and the United States.

As of the 2020 Summer Olympics, 51 National Olympic Committees (NOCs) from six continents have sent their water polo teams to the Olympic Games. Men's water polo teams of European NOCs won all 27 official tournaments, while women's teams from Europe, North America and Oceania won all six gold medals. Water polo teams from Africa, Asia and South America have not won an Olympic medal yet.

== Venues ==
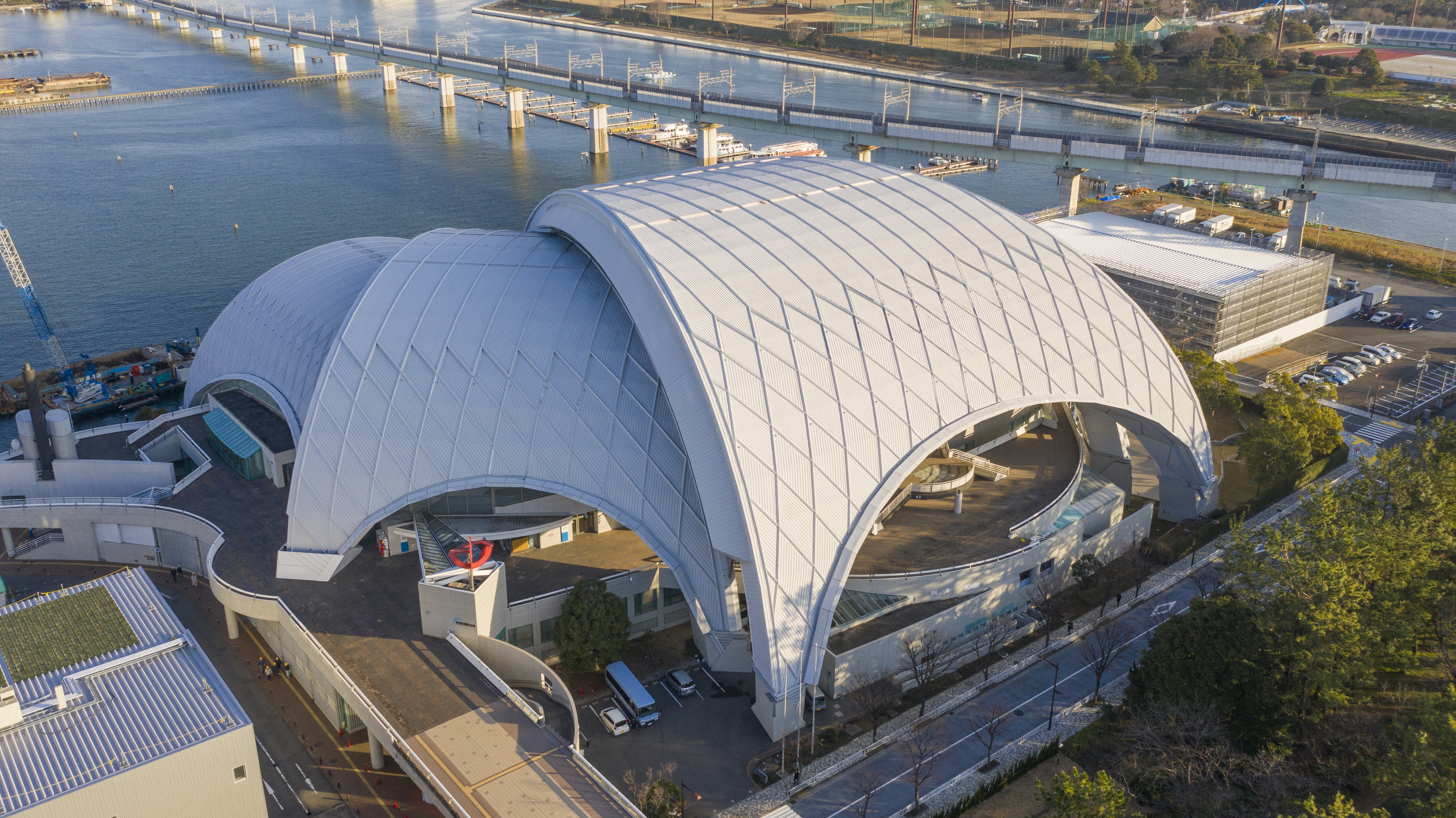
Tokyo Tatsumi International Swimming Center was used at the 2020 Olympics in water polo.

For the Summer Olympics, there are 34 venues that have been or will be used for water polo.

The Seine in Paris hosted the first water polo competitions at the 1900 Olympics. The Forest Park in St. Louis hosted the water polo events for the 1904 Summer Olympics.

The first water polo venue not located on a river or a lake took place at the 1908 London Olympics. It was not until the 1920 Olympics that a separate venue was created for the aquatic venues. The 1948 Games were the first Olympics in which water polo took place both indoors and in more than one venue. The first separate water polo venue that was not connected to other aquatic venues was at the 1964 Tokyo Olympics.

The Water Polo Arena of the 2012 London Olympics was the first dedicated water polo venue to be built for an Olympics; the structure was taken down after the games.

1. (France) Paris 1900: Seine, Paris
2. (United States) St. Louis 1904: Forest Park, St. Louis
3. (United Kingdom) London 1908: White City Stadium, White City
4. (Sweden) Stockholm 1912: Djurgårdsbrunnsviken, Stockholm
5. (Belgium) Antwerp 1920: Stade Nautique d'Antwerp, Antwerp
6. (France) Paris 1924: Piscine des Tourelles, Paris
7. (Netherlands) Amsterdam 1928: Olympic Sports Park Swim Stadium, Amsterdam
8. (United States) Los Angeles 1932: Swimming Stadium, Los Angeles
9. (Germany) Berlin 1936: Olympic Swimming Stadium, Berlin
10. (United Kingdom) London 1948: Empire Pool (final), Wembley; and Finchley Lido, North Finchley
11. (Finland) Helsinki 1952: Swimming Stadium, Helsinki
12. (Australia) Melbourne 1956: Swimming/Diving Stadium, Melbourne
13. (Italy) Rome 1960: Piscina delle Rose and Stadio Olimpico del Nuoto (final), both in Rome
14. (Japan) Tokyo 1964: Tokyo Metropolitan Indoor Swimming Pool, Tokyo
15. Mexico City 1968: Francisco Márquez Olympic Pool (final) and University City Swimming Pool, both in Mexico City
16. (West Germany) Munich 1972: Dantebad and Schwimmhalle (final), both in Munich
17. (Canada) Montreal 1976: Complexe sportif Claude-Robillard and Olympic Pool (final), both in Montreal
18. (Soviet Union) Moscow 1980: Swimming Pool - Moscow and Swimming Pool - Olimpiysky (final), both in Moscow
19. (United States) Los Angeles 1984: Raleigh Runnels Memorial Pool, Malibu, California
20. (South Korea) Seoul 1988: Jamsil Indoor Swimming Pool, Seoul
21. (Spain) Barcelona 1992: Piscina Municipal de Montjuïc and Piscines Bernat Picornell (finals), both in Barcelona
22. (United States) Atlanta 1996: Georgia Tech Aquatic Center, Atlanta
23. (Australia) Sydney 2000: Ryde Aquatic Leisure Centre, Ryde; and Sydney International Aquatic Centre, Sydney
24. (Greece) Athens 2004: Athens Olympic Aquatic Centre, Athens
25. (China) Beijing 2008: Ying Tung Natatorium, Beijing
26. (United Kingdom) London 2012: Water Polo Arena, London
27. (Brazil) Rio de Janeiro 2016: Maria Lenk Aquatics Centre and Olympic Aquatics Stadium (finals), Rio de Janeiro
28. (Japan) Tokyo 2020: Tokyo Tatsumi International Swimming Center, Tokyo
29. (France) Paris 2024: Paris Aquatic Centre and Paris La Défense Arena (finals)
30. (United States) Los Angeles 2028: Long Beach Waterfront
31. (Australia) Brisbane 2032: Sleeman Centre

Sources:

- Official Reports (PDF): 1900–1996;
- Official Results Books (PDF): 2000–2016;
- Olympedia: Water polo venues.

== Events ==
Notes
X indicates that the tournament was held as a full Olympic medal sport.

Event	96	00	04	08	12	20	24	28	32	36	48	52	56	60	64	68	72	76	80	84	88	92	96	00	04	08	12	16	20	24	28	Games
Men's tournament		X	X	X	X	X	X	X	X	X	X	X	X	X	X	X	X	X	X	X	X	X	X	X	X	X	X	X	X	X	X	30
Women's tournament																								X	X	X	X	X	X	X	X	8
Total	0	1	1	1	1	1	1	1	1	1	1	1	1	1	1	1	1	1	1	1	1	1	1	2	2	2	2	2	2	2	2	

== Rules ==
=== Qualification summary ===
Year	M	W
1900-1956	No Qualification	No Tournament
1960	1960 Men's Qualification	No Tournament
1964	1964 Men's Qualification	No Tournament
1968	1968 Men's Qualification	No Tournament
1972	1972 Men's Qualification	No Tournament
1976	1976 Men's Qualification	No Tournament
1980	1980 Men's Qualification	No Tournament
1984	1984 Men's Qualification	No Tournament
1988	1988 Men's Qualification	No Tournament
1992	1992 Men's Qualification	No Tournament
1996	1996 Men's Qualification	No Tournament
2000	2000 Men's Qualification	2000 Women's Qualification
2004	2004 Men's Qualification	2004 Women's Qualification
2008	2008 Men's Qualification	2008 Women's Qualification
2012	2012 Men's Qualification	2012 Women's Qualification
2016	2016 Men's Qualification	2016 Women's Qualification
2020	2020 Men's Qualification	2020 Women's Qualification
2024	2024 Men's Qualification	2024 Women's Qualification
2028	2028 Men's Qualification	2028 Women's Qualification
Total	17	7

=== Qualification ===
Since 2012, the qualifying process consists of five stages:

1. The team of the host nation qualifies automatically.
2. No more than one team qualifies as the top team in the FINA World League.
3. No more than three teams qualify as the top teams in the World Aquatics Championships.
4. No more than five teams qualify as the continental Olympic qualification tournament champions.
5. No more than four teams qualify through a world qualifying tournament, in which the best teams which did not qualify directly from each continent compete for the remaining berths.

Men's qualification
Stage	Zone	Tournament	Berths		
Stage	Zone	Tournament	2012	2016	2020
1	—	Host nation	1 (from Europe)	1 (from Americas)	1 (from Asia)
2	World – FINA	FINA Water Polo World League	1	1	1
3	World – FINA	World Aquatics Championships	3	2 ▼	2
4	Africa – CANA	African Continental Selection	0	0	1 ▲
4	Americas – UANA	Pan American Games	1	1	1
4	Asia – AASF	Asian Water Polo Championship	1	1	1
4	Europe – LEN	European Water Polo Championship	0	1 ▲	1
4	Oceania – OSA	Oceanian Continental Selection	1	1	1
5	World – FINA	World Qualification Tournament	4	4	3 ▼
Total			12	12	12

Women's qualification
Stage	Zone	Tournament	Berths		
Stage	Zone	Tournament	2012	2016	2020
1	—	Host nation	1 (from Europe)	1 (from Americas)	1 (from Asia)
2	World – FINA	FINA Water Polo World League	0	0	1 ▲
3	World – FINA	World Aquatics Championships	0	0	1 ▲
4	Africa – CANA	African Continental Selection	0	0	1 ▲
4	Americas – UANA	Pan American Games	1	0 ▼	1 ▲
4	Asia – AASF	Asian Water Polo Championship	1	1	1
4	Europe – LEN	European Water Polo Championship	0	1 ▲	1
4	Oceania – OSA	Oceanian Continental Selection	1	1	1
5	World – FINA	World Qualification Tournament	4	4	2 ▼
Total			8	8	10 ▲

=== Players ===
==== Eligibility ====
According to the FINA General Rules, the list below shows the requirements for a player to be eligible to play in international tournaments:

- "GR 1.1: All competitors shall be registered with their National Federation to be eligible to compete."
- "GR 2.5: When a competitor or competition official represents his/her country in a competition, he/she shall be a citizen, whether by birth or naturalisation, of the nation he/she represents, provided that a naturalised citizen shall have lived in that country for at least one year prior to that competition. Competitors, who have more than one nationality according to the laws of the respective nations must choose one 'Sport Nationality'. This choice shall be exercised by the first representation of the competitor for one of the countries."
- "GR 2.6: Any competitor or competition official changing his sport nationality from one national governing body to another must have resided in the territory of and been under the jurisdiction of the latter for at least twelve months prior to his first representation for the country."

=== Competition format ===
For both the men's and women's tournaments at the 2020 Olympics (which was postponed to 2021 due to the COVID-19 pandemic), the competition consists of a round-robin group stage followed by a knockout stage. Teams are placed into two groups, with each team playing each other team in its group once. Teams earn 2 points for a win, 1 point for a draw, and 0 points for a loss. The top four teams in each group advance to the knockout rounds. The knockout rounds are a single-elimination tournament consisting of quarterfinals, semifinals, and the gold and bronze medal matches.

Matches consist of four quarters of eight minutes each. During the knockout rounds, if the score is tied after four quarters (32 minutes), penalty shootouts, which is 5 rounds, plus extra rounds if tied, are used to determine the winner.

Men's tournament
#	Year	Dates	Number of		Competition format
#	Year	Dates	Teams	Matches	Competition format
1	1900	11–12 August	7 teams	6 matches	Single-elimination tournament
2	1904	5–6 September	3 teams ▼	2 matches ▼	Single-elimination tournament
3	1908	15–22 July	4 teams ▲	4 matches ▲	Single-elimination tournament
4	1912	7–16 July	6 teams ▲	10 matches ▲	Single-elimination tournament
5	1920	22–29 August	12 teams ▲	19 matches ▲	Single-elimination tournament with Bergvall system for second- and third-place
6	1924	13–20 July	13 teams ▲	19 matches	Single-elimination tournament with Bergvall system for second- and third-place
7	1928	4–11 August	14 teams ▲	18 matches ▼	Single-elimination tournament with Bergvall system for third place
8	1932	4–13 August	5 teams ▼	6 matches (Note: At the 1932 Olympics, Brazil was ejected from the competition after their players assaulted the Hungarian referee, Bela Komjadi, and other officials at the end of their match against Germany, leading to the entire team being arrested. Their two matches were annulled. For more details, please see the Official Report of the 1932 Olympic Games (pp. 650–651), and here.) ▼	Round-robin tournament
9	1936	8–15 August	16 teams ▲	40 matches ▲	Round-robin pools advanced teams to the round-robin semi-final pool; round-robin semi-final pools advanced teams to the round-robin final pool
10	1948	28 July – 7 August	18 teams ▲	40 matches (Note: At the 1948 Olympics, the water polo matches between Italy and Yugoslavia in Group D and between Egypt and Hungary in Group E were both replayed. For more details, please see here.)	Series of round-robin elimination pools, followed by round-robin semi-final pools, and then round-robin final pools
11	1952	25 July – 2 August	21 teams ▲	56 matches (Note: At the 1952 Olympics, the water polo match between the Netherlands and Yugoslavia in Group C was replayed. For more details, please see here.) ▲	Single-elimination tournament qualifying; round-robin pools advanced teams to the round-robin semi-final pool; round-robin semi-final pools advanced teams to the round-robin final pool
12	1956	28 November – 7 December	10 teams ▼	29 matches ▼	Round-robin pools advanced teams to the round-robin final pool
13	1960	25 August – 3 September	16 teams ▲	40 matches ▲	Round-robin pools advanced teams to the round-robin semi-final pool; round-robin semi-final pools advanced teams to the round-robin final pool
14	1964	11–18 October	13 teams ▼	31 matches ▼	Round-robin pools advanced teams to the round-robin semi-final pool; round-robin semi-final pools advanced teams to the round-robin final pool
15	1968	14–26 October	15 teams ▲	63 matches ▲	Round-robin pools advanced teams to classification matches
16	1972	27 August – 4 September	16 teams ▲	59 matches ▼	Round-robin pools advanced teams to the round-robin final pool
17	1976	18–27 July	12 teams ▼	48 matches ▼	Round-robin pools advanced teams to the round-robin final pool
18	1980	20–29 July	12 teams	48 matches	Round-robin pools advanced teams to the round-robin final pool
19	1984	1–10 August	12 teams	42 matches ▼	Round-robin pools advanced teams to the round-robin final pool
20	1988	21 September – 1 October	12 teams	42 matches	Round-robin pools advanced teams to classification matches
21	1992	1–9 August	12 teams	42 matches	Round-robin pools advanced teams to classification matches
22	1996	20–28 July	12 teams	48 matches ▲	Round-robin pools advanced teams to classification matches
23	2000	23 September – 1 October	12 teams	48 matches	Round-robin pools advanced teams to classification matches
24	2004	15–29 August	12 teams	44 matches ▼	Round-robin pools advanced teams to classification matches
25	2008	10–24 August	12 teams	44 matches	Round-robin pools advanced teams to classification matches
26	2012	29 July – 12 August	12 teams	42 matches ▼	Round-robin pools advanced teams to classification matches
27	2016	6–20 August	12 teams	42 matches	Round-robin pools advanced teams to classification matches
28	2020	25 July – 8 August 2021	12 teams	42 matches	Round-robin pools advanced teams to classification matches
29	2024	28 July – 11 August	12 teams	42 matches	Round-robin pools advanced teams to classification matches
30	2028		12 teams	42 matches	Round-robin pools advanced teams to classification matches
#	Year	Dates	Teams	Matches	Competition format
#	Year	Dates	Number of		Competition format

Women's tournament
#	Year	Dates	Number of		Competition format
#	Year	Dates	Teams	Matches	Competition format
1	2000	16–23 September	6 teams	20 matches	Round-robin pools advanced teams to classification matches
2	2004	16–26 August	8 teams ▲	20 matches	Round-robin pools advanced teams to classification matches
3	2008	11–21 August	8 teams	20 matches	Round-robin pools advanced teams to classification matches
4	2012	30 July – 9 August	8 teams	24 matches ▲	Round-robin pools advanced teams to classification matches
5	2016	9–19 August	8 teams	24 matches	Round-robin pools advanced teams to classification matches
6	2020	24 July – 7 August 2021	10 teams ▲	32 matches ▲	Round-robin pools advanced teams to classification matches
7	2024	27 July – 10 August	10 teams	32 matches	Round-robin pools advanced teams to classification matches
8	2028		12 teams ▲	42 matches ▲	Round-robin pools advanced teams to classification matches

Sources:

- Official Reports (PDF): 1900–1996;
- Official Results Books (PDF): 2000–2016;
- Olympedia: 1900–2016;
- Sports Reference: 1900–2016.

=== Game rules ===
==== Maximum number of players per team ====
Men's tournament
	Maximum number of players			
	1900–1904	1908–1980	1984–2016	2020–
In the playing area of the pool during an Olympic match	7	7	7	7
During an Olympic match	11	11	13 ▲	12 ▼
During an Olympic tournament	11	11	13 ▲	13
	per club	per nation	per nation	per nation

Women's tournament
	Maximum number of players	
	2000–2016	2020–
In the playing area of the pool during an Olympic match	7	7
During an Olympic match	13	12 ▼
During an Olympic tournament	13	13
	per nation	per nation

Sources:

- Official Reports (PDF): 1900–1996;
- Official Results Books (PDF): 2000–2016.

=== Anti-doping ===
The FINA follows the World Anti-Doping Agency's (WADA) regulations on performance-enhancing drugs. According to the WADA, a positive in-competition test results in disqualification of the player and a suspension that varies based on the number of offences. When a player tests positive, the rest of their team is subjected to testing; another positive test can result in a disqualification of the entire team.

== Men's tournament ==
=== Results summary ===
Year	Hosts	Gold medal game			Bronze medal game			Number of teams
Year	Hosts	Gold	Score	Silver	Bronze	Score	4th place	Number of teams
1900	(France); Paris	Great Britain	7–2	Belgium	France	(Note: France had four teams compete in 1900. Bronze medals were given to the losers of both semifinals; France took both bronze medals. Although Bill Burgess, a member of one of the French bronze medalist teams, was a British national, the IOC attributed the bronze medal to France based on the team's club affiliation.)		3
1904	(United States); St. Louis	Water polo was a demonstration sport			Water polo was a demonstration sport			
1908	(United Kingdom); London	Great Britain	9–2 (Note: As Great Britain had a bye in the first round, and then received a walkover in the semi-finals after Austria withdrew, the final was the only match that they played during the tournament.)	Belgium	Sweden	(Note: There was no bronze medal match at the 1908 Games in London. Belgium beat the Netherlands in the only first round match, and then beat Sweden in the only semi-final.)	Netherlands	4
1912	(Sweden); Stockholm	Great Britain	8–0	Sweden	Belgium	5–4	Austria	6
1920	(Belgium); Antwerp	Great Britain	3–2	Belgium	Sweden	5–0	United States	12
1924	(France); Paris	France	3–0	Belgium	United States	3–2	Sweden	13
1928	(Netherlands); Amsterdam	Germany	5–2	Hungary	France	8–1	Great Britain	14
1932	(United States); Los Angeles	Hungary	Round-robin	Germany	United States	Round-robin	Japan	5
1936	(Germany); Berlin	Hungary	Round-robin	Germany	Belgium	Round-robin	France	16
1948	(United Kingdom); London	Italy	Round-robin	Hungary	Netherlands	Round-robin	Belgium	18
1952	(Finland); Helsinki	Hungary	Round-robin	Yugoslavia	Italy	Round-robin	United States	21
1956	(Australia); Melbourne	Hungary	Round-robin	Yugoslavia	Soviet Union	Round-robin	Italy	10
1960	(Italy); Rome	Italy	Round-robin	Soviet Union	Hungary	Round-robin	Yugoslavia	16
1964	(Japan); Tokyo	Hungary	Round-robin	Yugoslavia	Soviet Union	Round-robin	Italy	13
1968	Mexico City	Yugoslavia	13–11 (aet)	Soviet Union	Hungary	9–4	Italy	15
1972	(West Germany); Munich	Soviet Union	Round-robin	Hungary	United States	Round-robin	West Germany	16
1976	(Canada); Montreal	Hungary	Round-robin	Italy	Netherlands	Round-robin	Romania	12
1980	(Soviet Union); Moscow	Soviet Union	Round-robin	Yugoslavia	Hungary	Round-robin	Spain	12
1984	(United States); Los Angeles	Yugoslavia	Round-robin	United States	West Germany	Round-robin	Spain	12
1988	(South Korea); Seoul	Yugoslavia	9–7 (aet)	United States	Soviet Union	14–13	West Germany	12
1992	(Spain); Barcelona	Italy	9–8 (aet)	Spain	Unified Team (Note: In 1992, 12 of the 15 former Soviet Republics competed together as the Unified Team and marched under the Olympic Flag in the Barcelona Games.)	8–4	United States	12
1996	(United States); Atlanta	Spain	7–5	Croatia	Italy	20–18 (aet)	Hungary	12
2000	(Australia); Sydney	Hungary	13–6	Russia	FR Yugoslavia (Note: After the breakup of Yugoslavia, FR Yugoslavia men's national water polo team participated at the 1996 and 2000 Olympics, and won a bronze medal in 2000. In 2003, after the country was renamed from FR Yugoslavia to Serbia and Montenegro, the team was also renamed to Serbia and Montenegro. Despite the renaming of the country name, both the team of FR Yugoslavia and the team of Serbia and Montenegro represented the same national entity: a joint state of Montenegro and Serbia.)	8–3	Spain	12
2004	(Greece); Athens	Hungary	8–7	Serbia and Montenegro	Russia	6–5	Greece	12
2008	(China); Beijing	Hungary	14–10	United States	Serbia	6–4	Montenegro	12
2012	(United Kingdom); London	Croatia	8–6	Italy	Serbia	12–11	Montenegro	12
2016	(Brazil); Rio	Serbia	11–7	Croatia	Italy	12–10	Montenegro	12
2020	(Japan); Tokyo	Serbia	13–10	Greece	Hungary	9–5	Spain	12
2024	(France); Paris	Serbia	13–11	Croatia	United States	8–8 (3–0) (ps)	Hungary	12
2028	(United States); Los Angeles							12

Sources:

- Official Reports (PDF): 1900–1996 (men's tournaments);
- Official Results Books (PDF): 2000–2020 (men's tournaments);
- Olympedia: 1900–2020 (men's tournaments);
- Sports Reference: 1900–2016 (men's tournaments).

=== Confederation statistics ===
==== Best performances by tournament ====
This is a summary of the best performances of each confederation in each tournament. Last updated: 8 August 2021.

Note: italic number in header means unofficial tournament was held.

Legend

- 1st – Champions
- 2nd – Runners-up
- 3rd – Third place
- 4th – Fourth place
- Q – Qualified for forthcoming tournament

Confederation	00	04	08	12	20	24	28	32	36	48	52	56	60	64	68	72	76	80	84	88	92	96	00	04	08	12	16	20	24
Africa – CANA	—		—	—	—	—	—	—	—	7th	10th	—	9th	12th	15th	—	—	—	—	—	—	—	—	12th	—	—	—	12th	—
Americas – UANA	—		—	—	4th	3rd	7th	3rd	9th	10th	4th	5th	7th	9th	5th	3rd	7th	5th	2nd	2nd	4th	7th	6th	7th	2nd	8th	10th	6th	3rd
Asia – AASF	—		—	—	—	—	—	4th	14th	12th	21st	10th	14th	11th	12th	15th	12th	—	9th	11th	—	—	9th	11th	12th	11th	12th	10th	11th
Europe – LEN	1st		1st	1st	1st	1st	1st	1st	1st	1st	1st	1st	1st	1st	1st	1st	1st	1st	1st	1st	1st	1st	1st	1st	1st	1st	1st	1st	1st
Oceania – OSA	—		—	—	—	—	—	—	—	18th	19th	9th	15th	10th	—	12th	11th	7th	5th	8th	5th	—	8th	9th	8th	7th	9th	9th	8th
Total teams	7		4	6	12	13	14	5	16	18	21	10	16	13	15	16	12	12	12	12	12	12	12	12	12	12	12	12	12

=== Team statistics ===
Rk	Rank	Ref	Reference	p.	page	pp.	pages

==== Comprehensive team results by tournament ====
Note: Results of Olympic qualification tournaments are not included. Numbers refer to the final placing of each team at the respective Games; italic number in header means unofficial tournament was held. Last updated: 11 February 2024.

Legend

- 1 – Champions
- 2 – Runners-up
- 3 – Third place
- 4 – Fourth place
- – Qualified but were not allowed to compete
- – Disqualified
- — – The nation did not participate in the Games
- Q – Qualified for forthcoming tournament
- – Hosts
- = – More than one team tied for that rank
- Team^{†} – Defunct team

Abbreviation

- stats – Olympic water polo team statistics
- EUA – United Team of Germany
- FRG – West Germany
- FRY – FR Yugoslavia
- GDR – East Germany
- SCG – Serbia and Montenegro

Africa – CANA (2 teams)
Men's team	00	04	08	12	20	24	28	32	36	48	52	56	60	64	68	72	76	80	84	88	92	96	00	04	08	12	16	20	24	Years
Egypt (stats)	—	—	—					—		7	10	—	13	12	15			—						12						6
South Africa	—										14		9	—	—	—	—	—	—	—								12	WD	3

Americas – UANA (8 teams)
Men's team	00	04	08	12	20	24	28	32	36	48	52	56	60	64	68	72	76	80	84	88	92	96	00	04	08	12	16	20	24	Years
Argentina		—		—			13			10	16		11					—												4
Brazil (stats)	—	—	—	—	6		—				9		12	13	13				12								8			8
Canada (stats)																16	9	—	10						11					4
Chile	—	—	—					—		17								—												1
Cuba			—	—	—										8	9	7	5	—	—	8									5
Mexico		—	—	—	—						18				11	13	10													4
United States (stats)					4	3	7	3	9	11	4	5	7	9	5	3		—	2	2	4	7	6	7	2	8	10	6	3	23
Uruguay	—	—	—	—	—				13	16								—												2

Asia – AASF (7 teams)
Men's team	00	04	08	12	20	24	28	32	36	48	52	56	60	64	68	72	76	80	84	88	92	96	00	04	08	12	16	20	24	Years
China	—	—	—	—	—	—	—	—	—	—		—	—	—	—	—	—	—	9	11					12					3
India		—	—	—						12	21																			2
Iran		—	—	—	—	—	—	—	—								12	—	—											1
Japan (stats)	—	—	—					4	14	—			14	11	12	15		—	11								12	10	11	10
Kazakhstan (stats)	—	—	—	—	—	Part of Soviet Union																	9	11		11		11		4
Singapore	—	—	—	—	—	—	—	—	—			10		—				—												1
South Korea	—	—	—	—	—	—	—	—	—									—		12										1

Europe – LEN (34 teams)
Men's team	00	04	08	12	20	24	28	32	36	48	52	56	60	64	68	72	76	80	84	88	92	96	00	04	08	12	16	20	24	Years
Austria				4	—				7		13																			3
Belgium (stats)	2	—	2	3	2	2	6		3	4	6		16	7																11
Bulgaria	—	—	—	—	—			—		—						11		12	—											2
Croatia (stats)	—	—	—	—	Part of Yugoslavia																	2	7	10	6	1	2	5	2	8
Czechoslovakia^{†}	—	—	—	—	12	6	10		11										—		12	Defunct								5
East Germany^{†}	Part of Germany											P. of EUA			6				—		Part of Germany									1
France (stats)	3	—		6	9	1	3		4	6			10							10	11						11		10	12
Germany (stats)	=5				—	—	1	2	2	—	15	See EUA			See FRG and GDR						7	9		5	10					9
Great Britain (stats)	1		1	1	1	8	4		8	13	12	7														12				11
Greece (stats)					8	13				15					14	14		10	8	9	10	6	10	4	7	9	6	2	5	17
Hungary (stats)				5	—	5	2	1	1	2	1	1	3	1	3	2	1	3	—	5	6	4	1	1	1	5	5	3	4	24
Iceland	—	—	—		—	—	—	—	15																					1
Ireland	—	—	—	—	—	9	14		—																					2
Italy (stats)		—			10	11				1	3	4	1	4	4	6	2	8	7	7	1	3	5	8	9	2	3	7	7	22
Luxembourg	—	—	—				11	—																						1
Malta	—	—	—	—	—	—	8	—	16		—	—		—			—													2
Montenegro (stats)	—	—	—	—	Part of Yugoslavia																P. of FRY / SCG				4	4	4	8	9	5
Netherlands (stats)		—	4		5	7	5		5	3	5		8	8	7	7	3	6	6		9	10	11							17
Portugal	—	—	—								20																			1
Romania (stats)		—	—	—	—			—		—	17	8	5	5		8	4	9				11				10			12	10
Russia (stats)	—	—	—	—	—	Part of Soviet Union																5	2	3						3
Serbia (stats)	—	—	—		Part of Yugoslavia																P. of FRY / SCG				3	3	1	1	1	5
Serbia and Montenegro^{†} (stats)	—	—	—	—	Part of Yugoslavia																See FRY			2	Defunct					1
Slovakia	—	—	—	—	Part of Czechoslovakia																		12							1
Soviet Union^{†} (Note: The Olympic Committee of the Soviet Union was formed on 21 April 1951, and was recognised by the International Olympic Committee on 7 May 1951.) (stats)	—	—	—	—	—	—	—	—	—	—	7	3	2	3	2	1	8	1	—	3	Defunct									9
Spain (stats)		—	—	—	7	10	9		—	8	8	—			9	10		4	4	6	2	1	4	6	5	6	7	4	6	19
Sweden (stats)		—	3	2	3	4			6	5	11							11												8
Switzerland					11	12	12		12	14		—																		5
Ukraine	—	—	—	—	—	—	—	—	—	—	Part of Soviet Union											12								1
(International Olympic Committee) Unified Team^{†} (stats)	—	—	—	—	—	Part of Soviet Union															3	Defunct								1
United Team of Germany^{†} (stats)	See Germany											6	6	6	See FRG and GDR						See Germany									3
West Germany^{†} (stats)	Part of Germany											P. of EUA			10	4	6	—	3	4	Part of Germany									5
Yugoslavia^{†} (stats)	—	—	—	—					10	9	2	2	4	2	1	5	5	2	1	1	Defunct									12
FR Yugoslavia^{†} (stats)	—	—	—	—	Part of Yugoslavia																—	8	3	Defunct						2

Oceania – OSA (1 team)
Men's team	00	04	08	12	20	24	28	32	36	48	52	56	60	64	68	72	76	80	84	88	92	96	00	04	08	12	16	20	24	Years
Australia (stats)			—	—						18	19	9	15	10	(Note: While Australia had qualified to compete as one of the sixteen teams, the Australian Olympic Committee (AOC) did not endorse them. The Australian players responded by paying their own way to travel to Mexico City, but the lack of endorsement meant the team were ineligible to compete. For more details, please see here (1, 2).)	12	11	7	5	8	5		8	9	8	7	9	9	8	18

Men's team	00	04	08	12	20	24	28	32	36	48	52	56	60	64	68	72	76	80	84	88	92	96	00	04	08	12	16	20	24	Years
Total teams	7		4	6	12	13	14	5	16	18	21	10	16	13	15	16	12	12	12	12	12	12	12	12	12	12	12	12	12	

==== Finishes in the top four ====
The following table is pre-sorted by total finishes in the top four (in descending order), number of Olympic gold medals (in descending order), number of Olympic silver medals (in descending order), number of Olympic bronze medals (in descending order), name of the team (in ascending order), respectively. Last updated: 8 August 2021.

Legend

- Year^{*} – As host team
- Team^{†} – Defunct team

Rk	Men's team	Total	Champions	Runners-up	Third place	Fourth place	First	Last
1	Hungary	18	9 (1932, 1936, 1952, 1956, 1964, 1976, 2000, 2004, 2008)	3 (1928, 1948, 1972)	4 (1960, 1968, 1980, 2020)	2 (1996, 2024)	1928	2024
2	Italy	11	3 (1948, 1960^{*}, 1992)	2 (1976, 2012)	3 (1952, 1996, 2016)	3 (1956, 1964, 1968)	1948	2016
3	United States	10		3 (1984^{*}, 1988, 2008)	4 (1924, 1932^{*}, 1972, 2024)	3 (1920, 1952, 1992)	1920	2024
4	Yugoslavia^{†}	8	3 (1968, 1984, 1988)	4 (1952, 1956, 1964, 1980)		1 (1960)	1952	1988
5	Soviet Union^{†}	7	2 (1972, 1980^{*})	2 (1960, 1968)	3 (1956, 1964, 1988)		1956	1988
6	Belgium	7		4 (1900, 1908, 1920^{*}, 1924)	2 (1912, 1936)	1 (1948)	1900	1948
7	Spain	6	1 (1996)	1 (1992^{*})		4 (1980, 1984, 2000, 2020)	1980	2020
8	Great Britain	5	4 (1900, 1908^{*}, 1912, 1920)			1 (1928)	1900	1928
9	Serbia	5	3 (2016, 2020, 2024)		2 (2008, 2012)		2008	2024
10	France	5	1 (1924^{*})		3 (1900^{*}×2, 1928)	1 (1936)	1900	1936
11	Croatia	4	1 (2012)	3 (1996, 2016, 2024)			1996	2024
12	Sweden	4		1 (1912^{*})	2 (1908, 1920)	1 (1924)	1908	1924
13	Germany	3	1 (1928)	2 (1932, 1936^{*})			1928	1936
14	Netherlands	3			2 (1948, 1976)	1 (1908)	1908	1976
15	West Germany^{†}	3			1 (1984)	2 (1972^{*}, 1988)	1972	1988
16	Montenegro	3				3 (2008, 2012, 2016)	2008	2016
17	Russia	2		1 (2000)	1 (2004)		2000	2004
18	Greece	2		1 (2020)		1 (2004^{*})	2004	2020
19	Serbia and Montenegro^{†}	1		1 (2004)			2004	2004
20	FR Yugoslavia^{†}	1			1 (2000)		2000	2000
20	(International Olympic Committee) Unified Team^{†}	1			1 (1992)		1992	1992
22	Austria	1				1 (1912)	1912	1912
22	Japan	1				1 (1932)	1932	1932
22	Romania	1				1 (1976)	1976	1976
Rk	Men's team	Total	Champions	Runners-up	Third place	Fourth place	First	Last

==== Medal table ====
The following table is pre-sorted by number of Olympic gold medals (in descending order), number of Olympic silver medals (in descending order), number of Olympic bronze medals (in descending order), name of the team (in ascending order), respectively. Last updated: 11 August 2024.

Hungary is the most successful country in the men's Olympic water polo tournament, with nine gold, three silver and four bronze.

Legend

- Team^{†} – Defunct team

Rank	Men's team	Gold	Silver	Bronze	Total
1	Hungary (HUN)	9	3	4	16
2	Great Britain (GBR) (Note: A British team won the gold medal in 1900. Although Victor Lindberg, a member of the team, was a New Zealander, the IOC attributed the gold medal to Great Britain based on the team's club affiliation.)	4	0	0	4
3	Yugoslavia (YUG)^{†}	3	4	0	7
4	Italy (ITA)	3	2	3	8
5	Serbia (SRB)	3	0	2	5
6	Soviet Union (URS)^{†}	2	2	3	7
7	United States (USA) (Note: Previously, the International Olympic Committee and International Swimming Federation (FINA) considered the water polo event at the 1904 Olympics as a demonstration sport. However, in July 2021, after accepting the recommendation of Olympic historian Bill Mallon, the IOC recognized water polo along with several others as an official sport of the 1904 Olympic program.)	1	4	5	10
8	Croatia (CRO)	1	3	0	4
9	Germany (GER)	1	2	0	3
10	Spain (ESP)	1	1	0	2
11	France (FRA)	1	0	3	4
12	Belgium (BEL)	0	4	2	6
13	Sweden (SWE)	0	1	2	3
14	Russia (RUS)	0	1	1	2
14	Serbia and Montenegro (SCG)^{†}	0	1	1	2
16	Greece (GRE)	0	1	0	1
17	Netherlands (NED)	0	0	2	2
18	Unified Team^{†}	0	0	1	1
18	West Germany (FRG)^{†}	0	0	1	1
Totals (19 entries)		29	29	30	88

==== Champions (results, squads) ====
Champions (results)

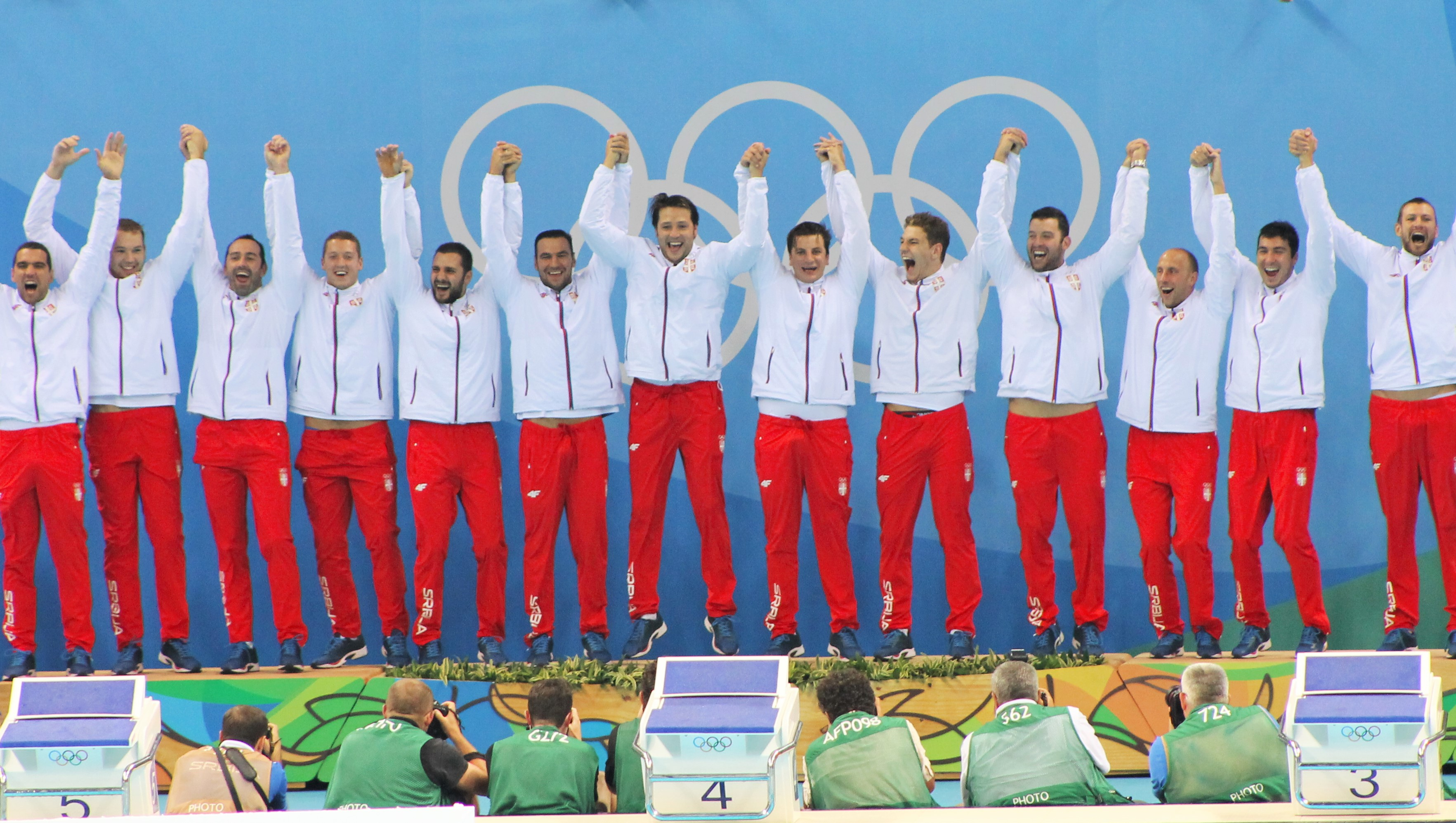
Serbia men's national water polo team celebrated after the gold medal match of the 2016 Summer Olympics.

The following table shows results of Olympic champions in men's water polo by tournament. Last updated: 8 August 2021.

Legend

- 6 – Winning 6 matches during the tournament
- 4 – Drawing 4 matches during the tournament
- 2 – Losing 2 matches during the tournament
- 100.0% – Winning all matches during the tournament
- Team – Olympic winning streak (winning three or more Olympic titles in a row)
- Team – Host team
- Team^{†} – Defunct team

Abbreviation

- MP – Matches played
- W – Won
- D – Drawn
- L – Lost
- GF – Goals for
- GA – Goals against
- GD – Goal difference
- GF/MP – Goals for per match
- GA/MP – Goals against per match
- GD/MP – Goal difference per match

Results of champions by tournament
#	Men's tournament	Champions	MP	W	D	L	Win %	GF	GA	GD	GF/MP	GA/MP	GD/MP
1	Paris 1900	Great Britain (1st title)	3	3	0	0	100.0%	29	3	26	9.667	1.000	8.667
2	St. Louis 1904	Water polo was a demonstration sport											
3	London 1908	Great Britain (2nd title)	1	1	0	0	100.0%	9	2	7	9.000	2.000	7.000
4	Stockholm 1912	Great Britain (3rd title)	3	3	0	0	100.0%	21	8	13	7.000	2.667	4.333
5	Antwerp 1920	Great Britain (4th title)	3	3	0	0	100.0%	19	4	15	6.333	1.333	5.000
6	Paris 1924	France (1st title)	4	4	0	0	100.0%	16	6	10	4.000	1.500	2.500
7	Amsterdam 1928	Germany (1st title)	3	3	0	0	100.0%	18	10	8	6.000	3.333	2.667
8	Los Angeles 1932	Hungary (1st title)	3	3	0	0	100.0%	30	2	28	10.000	0.667	9.333
9	Berlin 1936	Hungary (2nd title)	7	6	1	0	85.7%	44	4	40	6.286	0.571	5.714
10	London 1948	Italy (1st title)	7	6	1	0	85.7%	35	14	21	5.000	2.000	3.000
11	Helsinki 1952	Hungary (3rd title)	8	6	2	0	75.0%	53	16	37	6.625	2.000	4.625
12	Melbourne 1956	Hungary (4th title)	6	6	0	0	100.0%	26	4	22	4.333	0.667	3.667
13	Rome 1960	Italy (2nd title)	7	6	1	0	85.7%	31	12	19	4.429	1.714	2.714
14	Tokyo 1964	Hungary (5th title)	6	5	1	0	83.3%	34	13	21	5.667	2.167	3.500
15	Mexico City 1968	Yugoslavia^{†} (1st title)	9	7	1	1	77.8%	86	35	51	9.556	3.889	5.667
16	Munich 1972	Soviet Union^{†} (1st title)	8	6	2	0	75.0%	48	24	24	6.000	3.000	3.000
17	Montreal 1976	Hungary (6th title)	8	7	1	0	87.5%	45	32	13	5.625	4.000	1.625
18	Moscow 1980	Soviet Union^{†} (2nd title)	8	8	0	0	100.0%	58	31	27	7.250	3.875	3.375
19	Los Angeles 1984	Yugoslavia^{†} (2nd title)	7	6	1	0	85.7%	72	44	28	10.286	6.286	4.000
20	Seoul 1988	Yugoslavia^{†} (3rd title)	7	6	0	1	85.7%	83	55	28	11.857	7.857	4.000
21	Barcelona 1992	Italy (3rd title)	7	5	2	0	71.4%	59	50	9	8.429	7.143	1.286
22	Atlanta 1996	Spain (1st title)	8	6	0	2	75.0%	58	48	10	7.250	6.000	1.250
23	Sydney 2000	Hungary (7th title)	8	6	0	2	75.0%	78	57	21	9.750	7.125	2.625
24	Athens 2004	Hungary (8th title)	7	7	0	0	100.0%	59	39	20	8.429	5.571	2.857
25	Beijing 2008	Hungary (9th title)	7	6	1	0	85.7%	85	55	30	12.143	7.857	4.286
26	London 2012	Croatia (1st title)	8	8	0	0	100.0%	73	42	31	9.125	5.250	3.875
27	Rio 2016	Serbia (1st title)	8	5	2	1	62.5%	80	66	14	10.000	8.250	1.750
28	Tokyo 2020	Serbia (2nd title)	8	6	0	2	75.0%	103	71	32	12.875	8.875	4.000
29	Paris 2024	Serbia (3rd title)	8	5	0	3	62.5%	93	91	2	11.625	11.375	0.250
#	Men's tournament	Total	177	148	16	12	84.2%	1445	838	607	7.638	4.734	3.429
#	Men's tournament	Champions	MP	W	D	L	Win %	GF	GA	GD	GF/MP	GA/MP	GD/MP

Sources:

- Official Reports (PDF): 1900–1996 (men's tournaments);
- Official Results Books (PDF): 2000 (pp. 45–92), 2004 (p. 207), 2008 (p. 202), 2012 (p. 471), 2016 (p. 131), 2020 (p. 150);
- Olympedia: 1900–2020 (men's tournaments);
- Sports Reference: 1900–2016 (men's tournaments).

Champions (squads)
The following table shows number of players and average age, height and weight of Olympic champions in men's water polo by tournament. Last updated: 30 August 2021.

Legend

- Team – Olympic winning streak
- Team – Winning all matches during the tournament
- Team – Host team
- Team^{†} – Defunct team

Winning squads by tournament
#	Men's tournament	Champions	Players	Returning Olympians		Average		
#	Men's tournament	Champions	Number	Number	%	Age	Height	Weight
1	Paris 1900	Great Britain (1st title)	7	0	0.0%			
2	St. Louis 1904	Water polo was a demonstration sport						
3	London 1908	Great Britain (2nd title)	7	0	0.0%	26 years, 111 days		
4	Stockholm 1912	Great Britain (3rd title)	7	4	57.1%	29 years, 16 days		
5	Antwerp 1920	Great Britain (4th title)	7	3	42.9%	33 years, 279 days		
6	Paris 1924	France (1st title)	7	3	42.9%	26 years, 303 days		
7	Amsterdam 1928	Germany (1st title)	8	0	0.0%	24 years, 329 days		
8	Los Angeles 1932	Hungary (1st title)	10	7	70.0%	27 years, 291 days		
9	Berlin 1936	Hungary (2nd title)	11	5	45.5%	26 years, 66 days		
10	London 1948	Italy (1st title)	9	0	0.0%	30 years, 203 days		
11	Helsinki 1952	Hungary (3rd title)	13	6	46.2%	26 years, 337 days		
12	Melbourne 1956	Hungary (4th title)	12	7	58.3%	26 years, 148 days	1.81 m (5 ft 11 in) (Note: Average height of 9 players.)	80 kg (176 lb) (Note: Average weight of 8 players.)
13	Rome 1960	Italy (2nd title)	12	3	25.0%	22 years, 363 days	1.82 m (6 ft 0 in)	81 kg (179 lb)
14	Tokyo 1964	Hungary (5th title)	12	10	83.3%	28 years, 208 days	1.82 m (6 ft 0 in)	82 kg (181 lb)
15	Mexico City 1968	Yugoslavia^{†} (1st title)	11	5	45.5%	26 years, 151 days	1.90 m (6 ft 3 in)	94 kg (207 lb)
16	Munich 1972	Soviet Union^{†} (1st title)	11	5	45.5%	26 years, 351 days	1.84 m (6 ft 0 in)	87 kg (192 lb)
17	Montreal 1976	Hungary (6th title)	11	6	54.5%	25 years, 333 days	1.87 m (6 ft 2 in)	88 kg (194 lb)
18	Moscow 1980	Soviet Union^{†} (2nd title)	11	4	36.4%	25 years, 117 days	1.84 m (6 ft 0 in)	87 kg (192 lb)
19	Los Angeles 1984	Yugoslavia^{†} (2nd title)	13	3	23.1%	23 years, 362 days	1.93 m (6 ft 4 in)	92 kg (203 lb)
20	Seoul 1988	Yugoslavia^{†} (3rd title)	13	6	46.2%	23 years, 341 days	1.95 m (6 ft 5 in)	94 kg (207 lb)
21	Barcelona 1992	Italy (3rd title)	13	7	53.8%	26 years, 224 days	1.86 m (6 ft 1 in) (Note: Average height of 11 players.)	81 kg (179 lb) (Note: Average weight of 11 players.)
22	Atlanta 1996	Spain (1st title)	13	9	69.2%	26 years, 279 days	1.86 m (6 ft 1 in)	81 kg (179 lb)
23	Sydney 2000	Hungary (7th title)	13	5	38.5%	25 years, 254 days	1.93 m (6 ft 4 in)	93 kg (205 lb)
24	Athens 2004	Hungary (8th title)	13	10	76.9%	27 years, 344 days	1.96 m (6 ft 5 in)	96 kg (212 lb)
25	Beijing 2008	Hungary (9th title)	13	9	69.2%	29 years, 248 days	1.96 m (6 ft 5 in)	100 kg (220 lb)
26	London 2012	Croatia (1st title)	13	8	61.5%	29 years, 85 days	1.97 m (6 ft 6 in)	102 kg (225 lb)
27	Rio 2016	Serbia (1st title)	13	9	69.2%	28 years, 205 days	1.95 m (6 ft 5 in)	96 kg (212 lb)
28	Tokyo 2020	Serbia (2nd title)	13	10	76.9%	31 years, 250 days	1.94 m (6 ft 4 in)	95 kg (209 lb)
#	Men's tournament	Champions	Number	Number	%	Age	Height	Weight
#	Men's tournament	Champions	Players	Returning Olympians		Average		

Sources:

- Official Reports (PDF): 1900–1996 (men's tournaments);
- Official Results Books (PDF): 2000 (pp. 45–92), 2004 (p. 208), 2008 (p. 203), 2012 (p. 472), 2016 (p. 132), 2020 (p. 151);
- Olympedia: 1900–2020 (men's tournaments);
- Sports Reference: 1900–2016 (men's tournaments).

=== Player statistics ===
Rk	Rank	Ref	Reference	(C)	Captain
Pos	Playing position	FP	Field player	GK	Goalkeeper
L/R	Handedness	L	Left-handed	R	Right-handed
p.	page	pp.	pages		

==== Multiple appearances (five-time Olympians) ====
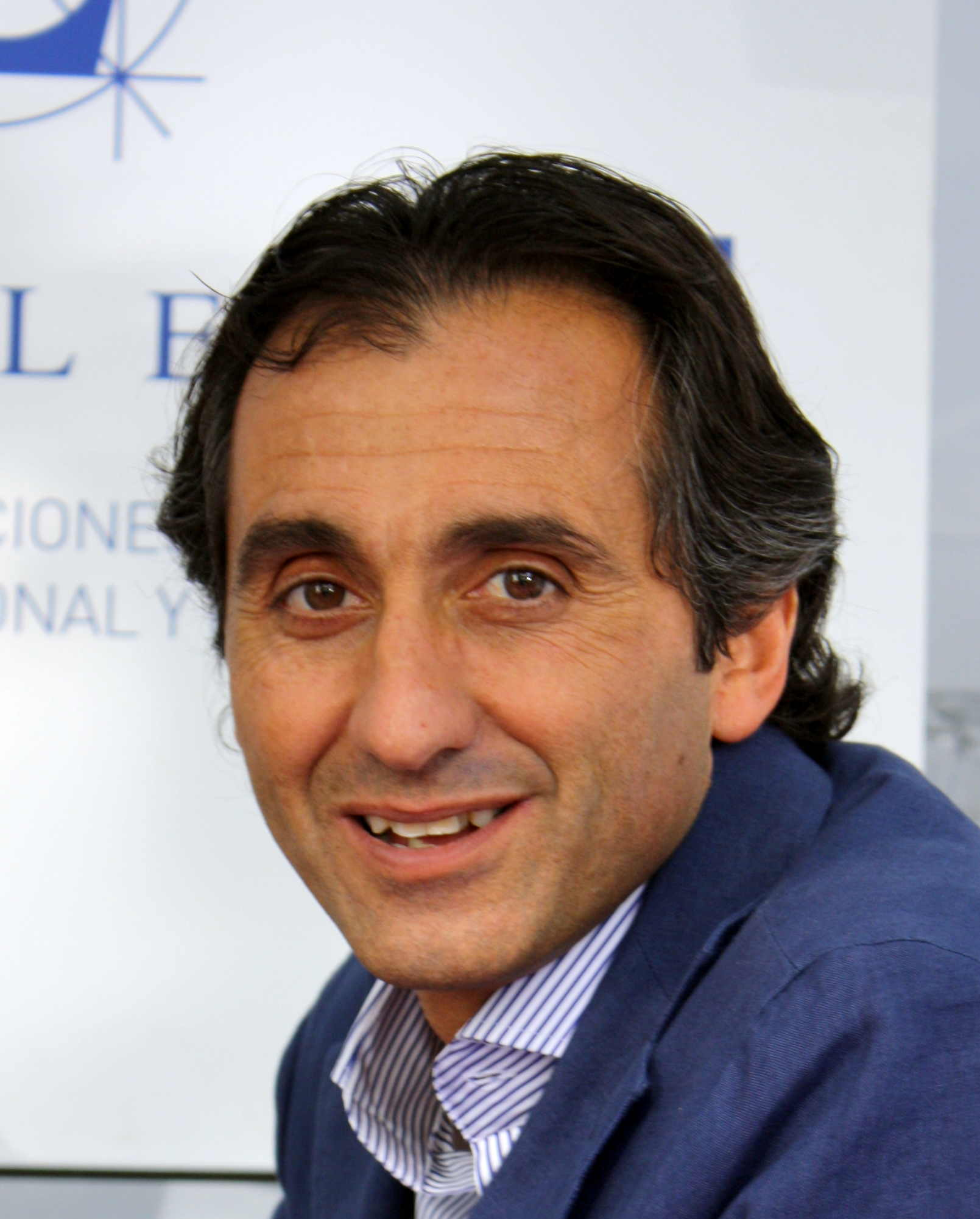
Manuel Estiarte of Spain is the only water polo player to compete at six Olympic Games (1980–2000).

The following table is pre-sorted by number of Olympic appearances (in descending order), year of the last Olympic appearance (in ascending order), year of the first Olympic appearance (in ascending order), date of birth (in ascending order), name of the player (in ascending order), respectively. Last updated: 26 July 2021.

Seventeen athletes competed in water polo at five or more Olympic Games between 1900 and 2020 inclusive. Paul Radmilovic, representing Great Britain, is the first water polo player to compete at five Olympics (1908–1928).

Four players (Manuel Estiarte, Salvador Gómez, Jesús Rollán and Jordi Sans) were all members of the Spain men's national water polo team (1988–2000). Manuel Estiarte is the first and only water polo player (man or woman) to compete at six Olympics (1980–2000). Jesús Rollán is the first water polo goalkeeper of either gender to compete at five Olympics (1984–2004).

Tony Azevedo of the United States is the first non-European water polo player to compete at five Olympic Games (2000–2016).

Italian goalkeeper Stefano Tempesti competed at five Olympics between 2000 and 2016.

Legend and abbreviation

- – Hosts
- Apps – Appearances

Male athletes who competed in water polo at five or more Olympics
Apps	Player	Birth	Height	Men's team	Pos	Water polo tournaments						Period (age of first/last)	Medals				Ref
Apps	Player	Birth	Height	Men's team	Pos	1	2	3	4	5	6	Period (age of first/last)	G	S	B	T	Ref
6	Manuel Estiarte	1961	1.78 m (5 ft 10 in)	Spain	FP	1980	1984	1988	1992	1996	2000	20 years (18/38)	1	1	0	2	
5	Paul Radmilovic	1886	1.80 m (5 ft 11 in)	Great Britain	FP	1908	1912	1920	1924	1928		20 years (22/42)	3	0	0	3	
5	Dezső Gyarmati	1927	1.86 m (6 ft 1 in)	Hungary	FP	1948	1952	1956	1960	1964		16 years (20/36)	3	1	1	5	
5	Gianni De Magistris	1950	1.85 m (6 ft 1 in)	Italy	FP	1968	1972	1976	1980	1984		16 years (17/33)	0	1	0	1	
5	Jordi Sans	1965	1.80 m (5 ft 11 in)	Spain	FP	1984	1988	1992	1996	2000		16 years (18/35)	1	1	0	2	
5	George Mavrotas	1967	1.75 m (5 ft 9 in)	Greece	FP	1984	1988	1992	1996	2000		16 years (17/33)	0	0	0	0	
5	Salvador Gómez	1968	1.94 m (6 ft 4 in)	Spain	FP	1988	1992	1996	2000	2004		16 years (20/36)	1	1	0	2	
5	Jesús Rollán	1968	1.87 m (6 ft 2 in)	Spain	GK	1988	1992	1996	2000	2004		16 years (20/36)	1	1	0	2	
5	Tibor Benedek	1972	1.90 m (6 ft 3 in)	Hungary	FP	1992	1996	2000	2004	2008		16 years (20/36)	3	0	0	3	
5	Igor Hinić	1975	2.02 m (6 ft 8 in)	Croatia	FP	1996	2000	2004	2008	2012		16 years (20/36)	1	1	0	2	
5	Tamás Kásás	1976	2.00 m (6 ft 7 in)	Hungary	FP	1996	2000	2004	2008	2012		16 years (20/36)	3	0	0	3	
5	Georgios Afroudakis	1976	1.94 m (6 ft 4 in)	Greece	FP	1996	2000	2004	2008	2012		16 years (19/35)	0	0	0	0	
5	Stefano Tempesti	1979	2.05 m (6 ft 9 in)	Italy	GK	2000	2004	2008	2012	2016		16 years (21/37)	0	1	1	2	
5	Tony Azevedo	1981	1.85 m (6 ft 1 in)	United States	FP	2000	2004	2008	2012	2016		16 years (18/34)	0	1	0	1	
5	Jesse Smith	1983	1.93 m (6 ft 4 in)	United States	FP	2004	2008	2012	2016	2020		17 years (21/38)	0	1	0	1	
5	Xavier García	1984	1.98 m (6 ft 6 in)	Spain	FP	2004	2008	2012				17 years (20/37)	0	1	0	1	
5	Xavier García	1984	1.98 m (6 ft 6 in)	Croatia	FP				2016	2020		17 years (20/37)	0	1	0	1	
5	Pietro Figlioli	1984	1.91 m (6 ft 3 in)	Australia	FP	2004	2008					17 years (20/37)	0	1	1	2	
5	Pietro Figlioli	1984	1.91 m (6 ft 3 in)	Italy	FP			2012	2016	2020		17 years (20/37)	0	1	1	2	
Apps	Player	Birth	Height	Men's team	Pos	1	2	3	4	5	6	Period (age of first/last)	G	S	B	T	Ref
Apps	Player	Birth	Height	Men's team	Pos	Water polo tournaments						Period (age of first/last)	Medals				Ref

==== Multiple medalists ====
The following table is pre-sorted by total number of Olympic medals (in descending order), number of Olympic gold medals (in descending order), number of Olympic silver medals (in descending order), year of receiving the last Olympic medal (in ascending order), year of receiving the first Olympic medal (in ascending order), name of the player (in ascending order), respectively. Last updated: 11 August 2024.

Eleven male athletes won four or more Olympic medals in water polo. Among them, seven were members of the Hungary men's national water polo team. Dezső Gyarmati is the first and only athlete (man or woman) to win five Olympic medals in water polo (three gold, one silver and one bronze).

Filip Filipović, Duško Pijetlović and Andrija Prlainović, all representing Serbia, won four consecutive Olympic medals between 2008 and 2021.

Legend

- – Hosts

Male athletes who won four or more Olympic medals in water polo
Rk	Player	Birth	Height	Men's team	Pos	Water polo tournaments					Period (age of first/last)	Medals				Ref
Rk	Player	Birth	Height	Men's team	Pos	1	2	3	4	5	Period (age of first/last)	G	S	B	T	Ref
1	Dezső Gyarmati	1927	1.86 m (6 ft 1 in)	Hungary	FP	1948	1952	1956	1960	1964	16 years (20/36)	3	1	1	5	
2	György Kárpáti	1935	1.67 m (5 ft 6 in)	Hungary	FP	1952	1956	1960	1964		12 years (17/29)	3	0	1	4	
2	Dušan Mandić	1994	2.02 m (6 ft 8 in)	Serbia	FP	2012	2016	2020	2024		12 years (18/30)	3	0	1	4	
4	László Jeney	1923	1.81 m (5 ft 11 in)	Hungary	GK	1948	1952	1956	1960		12 years (25/37)	2	1	1	4	
5	Mihály Mayer	1933	1.85 m (6 ft 1 in)	Hungary	FP	1956	1960	1964	1968		12 years (22/34)	2	0	2	4	
5	Filip Filipović	1987	1.96 m (6 ft 5 in)	Serbia	FP	2008	2012	2016	2020		13 years (21/34)	2	0	2	4	
5	Duško Pijetlović	1985	1.97 m (6 ft 6 in)	Serbia	FP	2008	2012	2016	2020		13 years (23/36)	2	0	2	4	
5	Andrija Prlainović	1987	1.87 m (6 ft 2 in)	Serbia	FP	2008	2012	2016	2020		13 years (21/34)	2	0	2	4	
9	András Bodnár	1942	1.80 m (5 ft 11 in)	Hungary	FP	1960	1964	1968	1972		12 years (18/30)	1	1	2	4	
9	Endre Molnár	1945	1.85 m (6 ft 1 in)	Hungary	GK	1968	1972	1976	1980		12 years (23/35)	1	1	2	4	
9	István Szívós Jr.	1948	2.02 m (6 ft 8 in)	Hungary	FP	1968	1972	1976	1980		12 years (20/32)	1	1	2	4	
12	Joseph Pletincx	1888		Belgium	FP	1908	1912	1920	1924		16 years (20/36)	0	3	1	4	
Rk	Player	Birth	Height	Men's team	Pos	1	2	3	4	5	Period (age of first/last)	G	S	B	T	Ref
Rk	Player	Birth	Height	Men's team	Pos	Water polo tournaments					Period (age of first/last)	Medals				Ref

Sources:

- Sports Reference: Athlete Medal Leaders (1900–2016);
- Official Results Books (PDF): 2000 (p. 27), 2004 (p. 89), 2008 (p. 79), 2012 (p. 370), 2016 (p. 6), 2020 (p. 11).

==== Multiple gold medalists ====
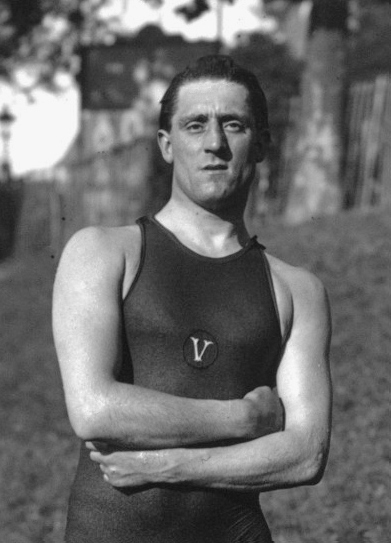
Paul Radmilovic, representing Great Britain, won three gold medals in water polo at the 1908, 1912 and 1920 Olympics.

The following table is pre-sorted by number of Olympic gold medals (in descending order), number of Olympic silver medals (in descending order), number of Olympic bronze medals (in descending order), year of receiving the last Olympic gold medal (in ascending order), year of receiving the first Olympic gold medal (in ascending order), name of the player (in ascending order), respectively. Last updated: 31 March 2021.

Ten athletes won three or more Olympic gold medals in water polo. Six players (Tibor Benedek, Péter Biros, Tamás Kásás, Gergely Kiss, Tamás Molnár and Zoltán Szécsi) were all members of the Hungary men's national water polo team that won three consecutive Olympic gold medals in 2000, 2004 and 2008.

There are thirty-one male athletes who won two Olympic gold medals in water polo.

Legend

- – Hosts

Male athletes who won three or more Olympic gold medals in water polo
Rk	Player	Birth	Height	Men's team	Pos	Water polo tournaments					Period (age of first/last)	Medals				Ref
Rk	Player	Birth	Height	Men's team	Pos	1	2	3	4	5	Period (age of first/last)	G	S	B	T	Ref
1	Dezső Gyarmati	1927	1.86 m (6 ft 1 in)	Hungary	FP	1948	1952	1956	1960	1964	16 years (20/36)	3	1	1	5	
2	György Kárpáti	1935	1.67 m (5 ft 6 in)	Hungary	FP	1952	1956	1960	1964		12 years (17/29)	3	0	1	4	
2	Dušan Mandić	1994	2.02 m (6 ft 8 in)	Serbia	FP	2012	2016	2020	2024		12 years (18/30)	3	0	1	4	
4	Paul Radmilovic	1886	1.80 m (5 ft 11 in)	Great Britain	FP	1908	1912	1920	1924	1928	20 years (22/42)	3	0	0	3	
4	Charles Smith	1879	1.86 m (6 ft 1 in)	Great Britain	GK	1908	1912	1920	1924		16 years (29/45)	3	0	0	3	
4	Tibor Benedek	1972	1.90 m (6 ft 3 in)	Hungary	FP	1992	1996	2000	2004	2008	16 years (20/36)	3	0	0	3	
4	Péter Biros	1976	1.96 m (6 ft 5 in)	Hungary	FP	2000	2004	2008	2012		12 years (24/36)	3	0	0	3	
4	Tamás Kásás	1976	2.00 m (6 ft 7 in)	Hungary	FP	1996	2000	2004	2008	2012	16 years (20/36)	3	0	0	3	
4	Gergely Kiss	1977	1.98 m (6 ft 6 in)	Hungary	FP	2000	2004	2008	2012		12 years (22/34)	3	0	0	3	
4	Tamás Molnár	1975	1.93 m (6 ft 4 in)	Hungary	FP	2000	2004	2008			8 years (25/33)	3	0	0	3	
4	Zoltán Szécsi	1977	1.98 m (6 ft 6 in)	Hungary	GK	2000	2004	2008	2012		12 years (22/34)	3	0	0	3	
4	Nikola Jakšić	1997	1.96 m (6 ft 5 in)	Serbia	FP	2016	2020	2024			8 years (19/27)	3	0	0	3	
4	Sava Ranđelović	1993	1.93 m (6 ft 4 in)	Serbia	FP	2016	2020	2024			8 years (23/31)	3	0	0	3	
Rk	Player	Birth	Height	Men's team	Pos	1	2	3	4	5	Period (age of first/last)	G	S	B	T	Ref
Rk	Player	Birth	Height	Men's team	Pos	Water polo tournaments					Period (age of first/last)	Medals				Ref

==== Top goalscorers (one match, one tournament, all-time) ====
Top goalscorers (one match)

Top goalscorers (one tournament)

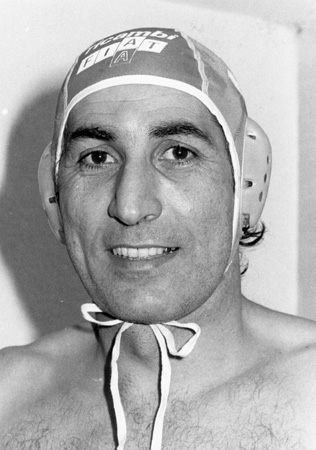
Eraldo Pizzo of Italy scored 29 goals at the 1968 Olympics.

The following table is pre-sorted by number of goals (in descending order), edition of the Olympics (in ascending order), number of matches played (in ascending order), name of the player (in ascending order), respectively. Last updated: 1 April 2021.

Five male players have scored 25 or more goals in an Olympic water polo tournament.

Spaniard Manuel Estiarte is the first and only water polo player to achieve this feat twice. At the 1984 Summer Olympics, Estiarte netted 34 goals, setting the record for the most goals scored by a water polo player in a single Olympic tournament. Four years later, he scored 27 goals in Seoul.

The most recent player to scoring 25 or more goals in a tournament was Alessandro Calcaterra, with Italy men's national team at the 2008 Beijing Olympics.

Legend

- Team – Host team
- Player^{‡} – Player who won the tournament with his team

Male players with 25 or more goals in an Olympic tournament
Rk	Year	Player	Birth	Age	Height	L/R	Goals	Matches played	Goals per match	Men's team	Finish	Ref
1	1984	Manuel Estiarte	1961	22	1.78 m (5 ft 10 in)	Right	34	7	4.857	Spain	4th of 12 teams	
2	1968	Nico van der Voet	1944	24	1.86 m (6 ft 1 in)		33	9	3.667	Netherlands	7th of 15 teams	
3	1968	Eraldo Pizzo	1938	30	1.87 m (6 ft 2 in)	Right	29	9	3.222	Italy	4th of 15 teams	
4	1988	Manuel Estiarte (2)	1961	26	1.78 m (5 ft 10 in)	Right	27	7	3.857	Spain	6th of 12 teams	
4	2008	Alessandro Calcaterra	1975	33	1.87 m (6 ft 2 in)	Right	27	8	3.375	Italy	9th of 12 teams	
6	1968	Rubén Junco	1950	18	1.54 m (5 ft 1 in)		26	8	3.250	Cuba	8th of 15 teams	
Rk	Year	Player	Birth	Age	Height	L/R	Goals	Matches played	Goals per match	Men's team	Finish	Ref

Sources:

- Official Reports (PDF): 1900–1972, 1976 (p. 497), 1980 (p. 510), 1984 (p. 534), 1988–1996;
- Official Results Books (PDF): 2000 (pp. 45–92), 2004 (p. 184), 2008 (p. 179), 2012 (p. 466), 2016 (p. 100);
- Olympedia: 1900–2016 (men's tournaments);
- Sports Reference: 1900–2016 (men's tournaments).

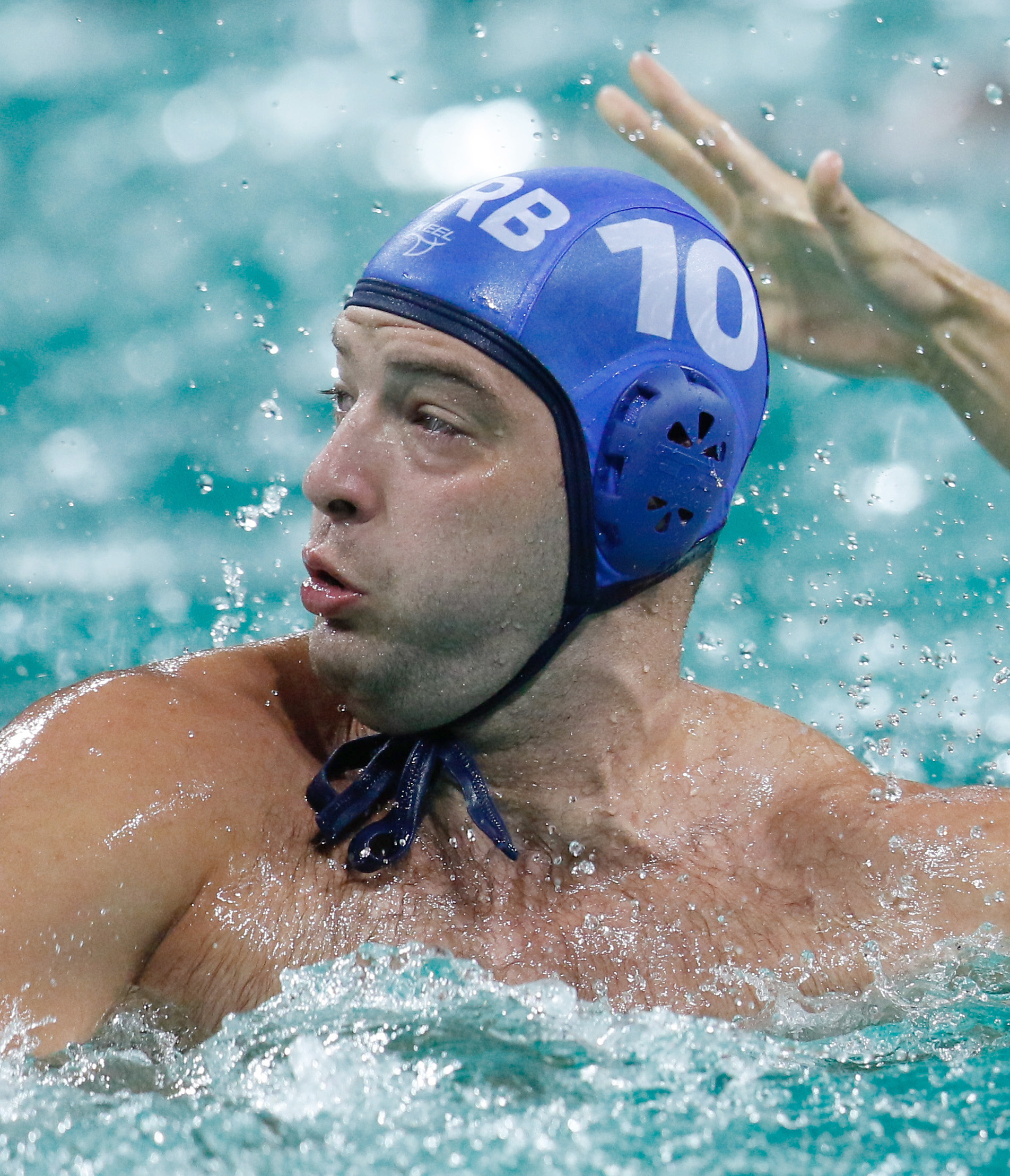
Filip Filipović scored 19 goals at the 2016 Olympics, helping Serbia win gold. He was named the Most Valuable Player of the men's water polo tournament.

The following table is pre-sorted by edition of the Olympics (in ascending order), number of matches played (in ascending order), name of the player (in ascending order), respectively. Last updated: 1 April 2021.

Hans Schneider of Germany scored 22 goals at the 1936 Berlin Olympics, which stood as an Olympic water polo record for one Games until 1968, when the Dutch player Nico van der Voet netted 33 goals in Mexico City.

At 18 years old, Manuel Estiarte of Spain made his Olympic debut at the 1980 Moscow Olympics, where he was the youngest-ever male top goalscorer with 21 goals. He was also the top goalscorer at the 1984 Los Angeles Olympics and the 1988 Seoul Olympics, with 34 and 27 goals, respectively. He was the joint top goalscorer at the 1992 Barcelona Olympics with 22 goals.

Hungarian left-handed player Tibor Benedek was the joint top goalscorer at the 1992 Games with 22 goals, and the top goalscorer at the 1996 Atlanta Olympics with 19 goals.

Aleksandar Šapić, representing FR Yugoslavia, was the top goalscorer at the 2000 Sydney Olympics with 18 goals. Four years later, he netted 18 goals for Serbia and Montenegro, becoming the top goalscorer at the 2004 Athens Olympics.

31-year-old István Szívós Sr. scored 16 goals for Hungary at the 1952 Helsinki Olympics, which stood as an age record for the oldest top goalscorer in a single Olympic water polo tournament until 2008, when 33-year-old Alessandro Calcaterra of Italy netted 27 goals in Beijing.

Left-hander Filip Filipović of Serbia was the joint top goalscorer at the 2016 Olympics, with 19 goals. He netted two goals in the gold medal match, helping the Serbian team win the Olympics.

Legend

- Team – Host team
- Player^{‡} – Player who won the tournament with his team

Male players with the most goals in each Olympic tournament
Year	Player	Birth	Age	Height	L/R	Goals	Matches played	Goals per match	Men's team	Finish	Ref
1900	John Jarvis^{‡}	1872	28			6	1	6.000	Great Britain	1st of 7 teams	
1908	Fernand Feyaerts	1880	27–28			8	3	2.667	Belgium	2nd of 4 teams	
1912	Robert Andersson	1886	25			9	4	2.250	Sweden	2nd of 6 teams	
1920	Erik Andersson	1896	24			10	4	2.500	Sweden	3rd of 12 teams	
1924	Pierre Dewin	1894	29–30			14	5	2.800	Belgium	2nd of 13 teams	
1928	Ferenc Keserű	1903	24	1.55 m (5 ft 1 in)		10	4	2.500	Hungary	2nd of 14 teams	
1932	Philip Daubenspeck	1905	26			14	4	3.500	United States	3rd of 5 teams	
1936	Hans Schneider	1909	26			22	7	3.143	Germany	2nd of 16 teams	
1948	Aldo Ghira^{‡}	1920	28			18	7	2.571	Italy	1st of 18 teams	
1952	Ruud van Feggelen	1924	28			16	8	2.000	Netherlands	5th of 21 teams	
1952	István Szívós Sr.^{‡}	1920	31	1.85 m (6 ft 1 in)	Right	16	8	2.000	Hungary	1st of 21 teams	
1956	Petre Mshvenieradze	1929	27	1.86 m (6 ft 1 in)		11	7	1.571	Soviet Union	3rd of 10 teams	
1960	Fred Tisue	1938	21	1.75 m (5 ft 9 in)		12	7	1.714	United States	7th of 16 teams	
1960	Aurel Zahan	1938	22	1.83 m (6 ft 0 in)		12	7	1.714	Romania	5th of 16 teams	
1964	Nico van der Voet	1944	20	1.86 m (6 ft 1 in)		10	7	1.429	Netherlands	8ht of 13 teams	
1968	Nico van der Voet (2)	1944	24	1.86 m (6 ft 1 in)		33	9	3.667	Netherlands	7th of 15 teams	
1972	Carlos Sánchez	1952	20	1.71 m (5 ft 7 in)		18	9	2.000	Cuba	9th of 16 teams	
1976	Tamás Faragó^{‡}	1952	23	1.94 m (6 ft 4 in)	Right	22	8	2.750	Hungary	1st of 12 teams	
1980	Manuel Estiarte	1961	18	1.78 m (5 ft 10 in)	Right	21	8	2.625	Spain	4th of 12 teams	
1984	Manuel Estiarte (2)	1961	22	1.78 m (5 ft 10 in)	Right	34	7	4.857	Spain	4th of 12 teams	
1988	Manuel Estiarte (3)	1961	26	1.78 m (5 ft 10 in)	Right	27	7	3.857	Spain	6th of 12 teams	
1992	Tibor Benedek	1972	20	1.90 m (6 ft 3 in)	Left	22	7	3.143	Hungary	6th of 12 teams	
1992	Manuel Estiarte (4)	1961	30	1.78 m (5 ft 10 in)	Right	22	7	3.143	Spain	2nd of 12 teams	
1996	Tibor Benedek (2)	1972	24	1.90 m (6 ft 3 in)	Left	19	8	2.375	Hungary	4th of 12 teams	
2000	Aleksandar Šapić	1978	22	1.88 m (6 ft 2 in)	Right	18	8	2.250	FR Yugoslavia	3rd of 12 teams	
2004	Aleksandar Šapić (2)	1978	26	1.88 m (6 ft 2 in)	Right	18	8	2.250	Serbia and Montenegro	2nd of 12 teams	
2008	Alessandro Calcaterra	1975	33	1.87 m (6 ft 2 in)	Right	27	8	3.375	Italy	9th of 12 teams	
2012	Andrija Prlainović	1987	25	1.87 m (6 ft 2 in)	Right	22	8	2.750	Serbia	3rd of 12 teams	
2016	Filip Filipović^{‡}	1987	29	1.96 m (6 ft 5 in)	Left	19	8	2.375	Serbia	1st of 12 teams	
2016	Guillermo Molina	1984	32	1.95 m (6 ft 5 in)	Right	19	8	2.375	Spain	7th of 12 teams	
Year	Player	Birth	Age	Height	L/R	Goals	Matches played	Goals per match	Men's team	Finish	Ref

Sources:

- Official Reports (PDF): 1900–1972, 1976 (p. 497), 1980 (p. 510), 1984 (p. 534), 1988–1996;
- Official Results Books (PDF): 2000 (pp. 45–92), 2004 (p. 184), 2008 (p. 179), 2012 (p. 466), 2016 (p. 100);
- Olympedia: 1900–2016 (men's tournaments);
- Sports Reference: 1900–2016 (men's tournaments).

Top goalscorers (all-time)

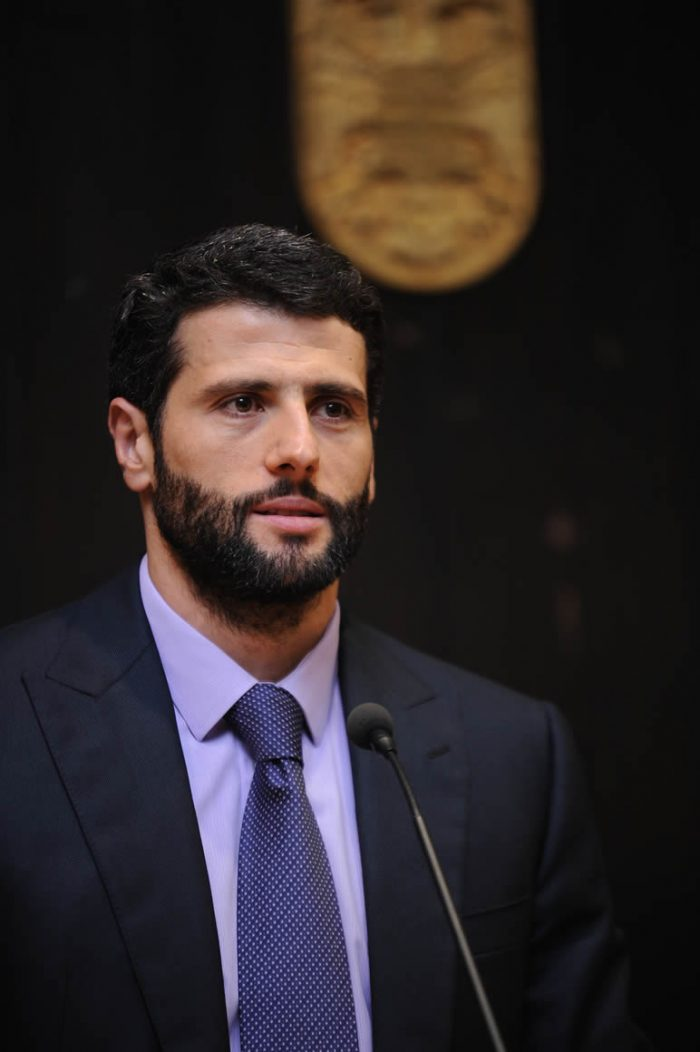
Aleksandar Šapić scored 64 goals at four Olympics (1996–2008).

The following table is pre-sorted by number of total goals (in descending order), number of total Olympic matches played (in ascending order), date of the last Olympic match played (in ascending order), date of the first Olympic match played (in ascending order), name of the player (in ascending order), respectively. Last updated: 1 April 2021.

Six-time Olympian Manuel Estiarte holds the record for the most goals scored by a water polo player in Olympic history, with 127 goals, far more than any other player. At his first three Olympics (1980–1988), Estiarte netted 82 goals.

Hungarian left-hander Tibor Benedek scored 65 goals at five Olympics (1992–2008), and his teammate Tamás Kásás netted 56 goals between 1996 and 2012.

Aleksandar Šapić, representing FR Yugoslavia in 1996 and 2000, Serbia and Montenegro in 2004, and Serbia in 2008, scored 64 goals in 32 matches.

Tony Azevedo of the United States holds the record for the most goals scored by a non-European water polo player in Olympic history, with 61 goals at five Olympics (2000–2016).

Gianni De Magistris is the top scorer for the Italy men's Olympic water polo team, with 59 goals (1968–1984). His compatriot Eraldo Pizzo netted 53 goals at four Olympics between 1960 and 1972.

Charles Turner, representing Australia between 1976 and 1984, scored 50 goals in 23 matches.

Legend

- – Hosts

All-time male players with 50 or more goals at the Olympics
Rk	Player	Birth	Height	L/R	Men's team	Total goals	Total matches played	Goals per match	Tournaments (goals)						Period (age of first/last)	Medals				Ref
Rk	Player	Birth	Height	L/R	Men's team	Total goals	Total matches played	Goals per match	1	2	3	4	5	6	Period (age of first/last)	G	S	B	T	Ref
1	Manuel Estiarte	1961	1.78 m (5 ft 10 in)	Right	Spain	127	45	2.822	1980 (21)	1984 (34)	1988 (27)	1992 (22)	1996 (13)	2000 (10)	20 years (18/38)	1	1	0	2	
2	Tibor Benedek	1972	1.90 m (6 ft 3 in)	Left	Hungary	65	37	1.757	1992 (22)	1996 (19)	2000 (9)	2004 (5)	2008 (10)		16 years (20/36)	3	0	0	3	
3	Aleksandar Šapić	1978	1.88 m (6 ft 2 in)	Right	FR Yugoslavia	64	32	2.000	1996 (8)	2000 (18)					12 years (18/30)	0	1	2	3	
3	Aleksandar Šapić	1978	1.88 m (6 ft 2 in)	Right	Serbia and Montenegro	64	32	2.000			2004 (18)				12 years (18/30)	0	1	2	3	
3	Aleksandar Šapić	1978	1.88 m (6 ft 2 in)	Right	Serbia	64	32	2.000				2008 (20)			12 years (18/30)	0	1	2	3	
4	Tony Azevedo	1981	1.85 m (6 ft 1 in)	Right	United States	61	35	1.743	2000 (13)	2004 (15)	2008 (17)	2012 (11)	2016 (5)		16 years (18/34)	0	1	0	1	
5	Gianni De Magistris	1950	1.85 m (6 ft 1 in)	Right	Italy	59	40	1.475	1968 (6)	1972 (11)	1976 (11)	1980 (20)	1984 (11)		16 years (17/33)	0	1	0	1	
6	Tamás Kásás	1976	2.00 m (6 ft 7 in)	Right	Hungary	56	38	1.474	1996 (13)	2000 (12)	2004 (14)	2008 (8)	2012 (9)		16 years (20/36)	3	0	0	3	
7	Eraldo Pizzo	1938	1.87 m (6 ft 2 in)	Right	Italy	53	29	1.828	1960 (7)	1964 (5)	1968 (29)	1972 (12)			12 years (22/34)	1	0	0	1	
8	Charles Turner	1952	1.86 m (6 ft 1 in)	Right	Australia	50	23	2.174	1976 (15)	1980 (17)	1984 (18)				8 years (23/31)	0	0	0	0	

Sources:

- Official Reports (PDF): 1900–1972, 1976 (p. 497), 1980 (p. 510), 1984 (p. 534), 1988–1996;
- Official Results Books (PDF): 2000 (pp. 45–92), 2004 (p. 184), 2008 (p. 179), 2012 (p. 466), 2016 (p. 100);
- Olympedia: 1900–2016 (men's tournaments);
- Sports Reference: 1900–2016 (men's tournaments).

==== Top goalkeepers (one match, one tournament, all-time) ====
Top goalkeepers (one match)

Top goalkeepers (one tournament)

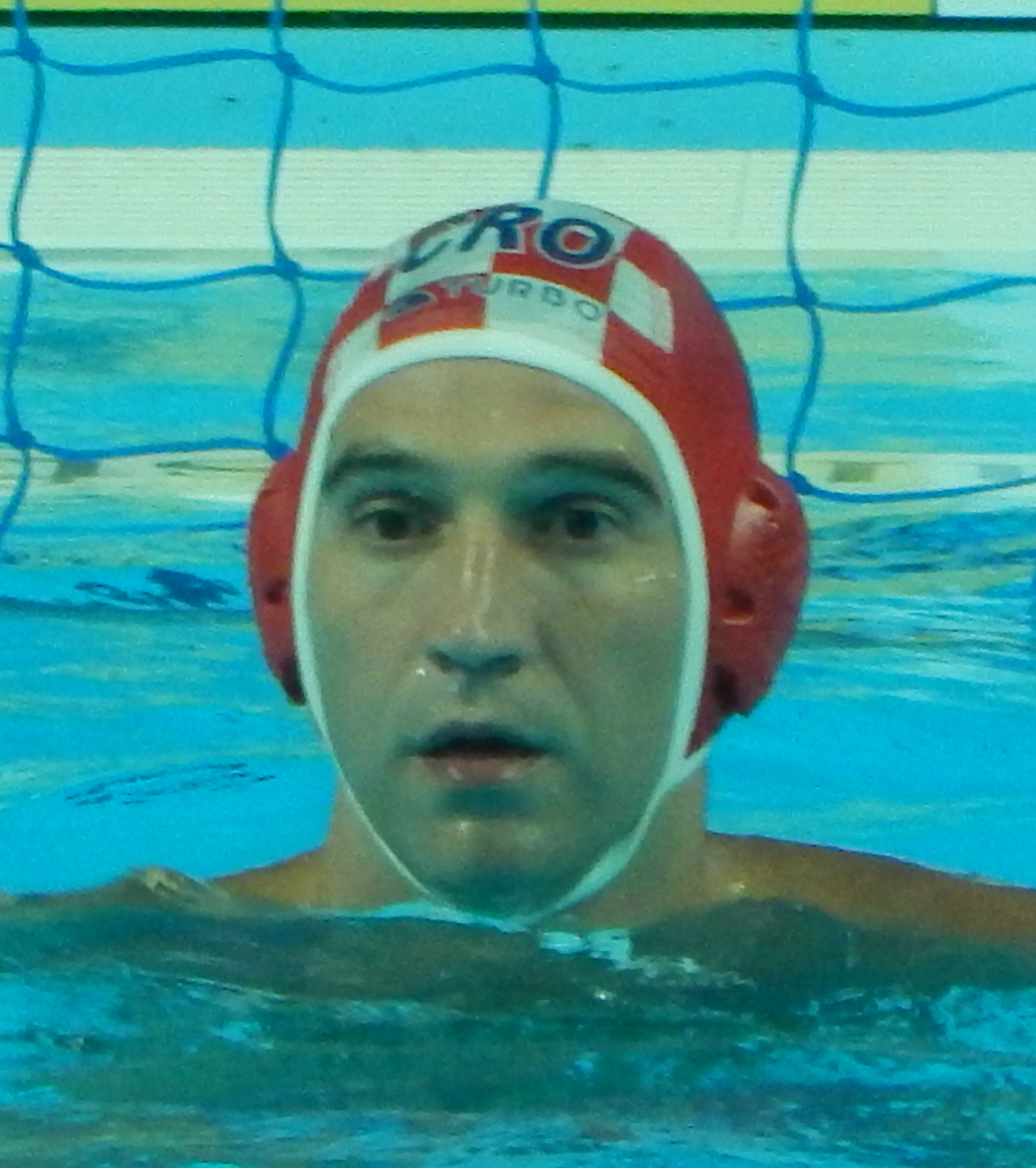
Josip Pavić saved 85 shots at the 2012 Games, helping Croatia win the Olympic title. He was named the Most Valuable Player of the men's water polo tournament.

The following table is pre-sorted by number of saves (in descending order), edition of the Olympics (in ascending order), number of matches played (in ascending order), name of the goalkeeper (in ascending order), respectively. Last updated: 1 April 2021.

Since 1996, six male goalkeepers have saved 75 or more shots in an Olympic water polo tournament.

Stefano Tempesti of Italy is the first water polo goalkeeper to achieve this feat twice. At the 2008 Olympics, Tempesti saved 83 shots. Four years later in London, he blocked 87 shots, setting the record for the most saves by a water polo goalkeeper in a single Olympic tournament.

Slobodan Soro is the second goalkeeper to achieve this feat twice. At the 2012 London Olympics, Soro saved 75 shots for Serbia. In Rio de Janeiro, he saved 81 shots for Brazil.

At the 2012 Summer Games, Josip Pavić saved 85 shots, including nine in the gold medal match, helping the Croatia team win the Olympics. He is the most efficient one among these six goalkeepers.

Legend and abbreviation

- Team – Host team
- Player^{‡} – Player who won the tournament with his team
- MP – Matches played
- Eff % – Save efficiency (Saves / Shots)
- 70.2% – Highest save efficiency

Male goalkeepers with 75 or more saves in an Olympic tournament (statistics since 1996)
Rk	Year	Goalkeeper	Birth	Age	Height	Saves	Shots	Eff %	MP	Saves per match	Men's team	Finish	Ref
1	2012	Stefano Tempesti	1979	33	2.05 m (6 ft 9 in)	87	147	59.2%	8	10.875	Italy	2nd of 12 teams	
2	2012	Josip Pavić^{‡}	1982	30	1.95 m (6 ft 5 in)	85	121	70.2%	8	10.625	Croatia	1st of 12 teams	
3	2008	Stefano Tempesti (2)	1979	29	2.05 m (6 ft 9 in)	83	169	49.1%	8	10.375	Italy	9th of 12 teams	
4	1996	Arie van de Bunt	1969	27	1.85 m (6 ft 1 in)	81	154	52.6%	8	10.125	Netherlands	10th of 12 teams	
4	2016	Slobodan Soro	1978	37	1.96 m (6 ft 5 in)	81	152	53.3%	8	10.125	Brazil	8th of 12 teams	
6	1996	Christopher Duplanty	1965	30	1.90 m (6 ft 3 in)	77	132	58.3%	8	9.625	United States	7th of 12 teams	
6	1996	Siniša Školneković	1968	28	1.94 m (6 ft 4 in)	77	135	57.0%	8	9.625	Croatia	2nd of 12 teams	
8	2012	Slobodan Soro (2)	1978	33	1.96 m (6 ft 5 in)	75	135	55.6%	8	9.375	Serbia	3rd of 12 teams	
Rk	Year	Goalkeeper	Birth	Age	Height	Saves	Shots	Eff %	MP	Saves per match	Men's team	Finish	Ref

Sources:

- Official Reports (PDF): 1996 (pp. 56–73);
- Official Results Books (PDF): 2000 (pp. 45–92), 2004 (p. 180), 2008 (p. 175), 2012 (p. 462), 2016 (p. 102).

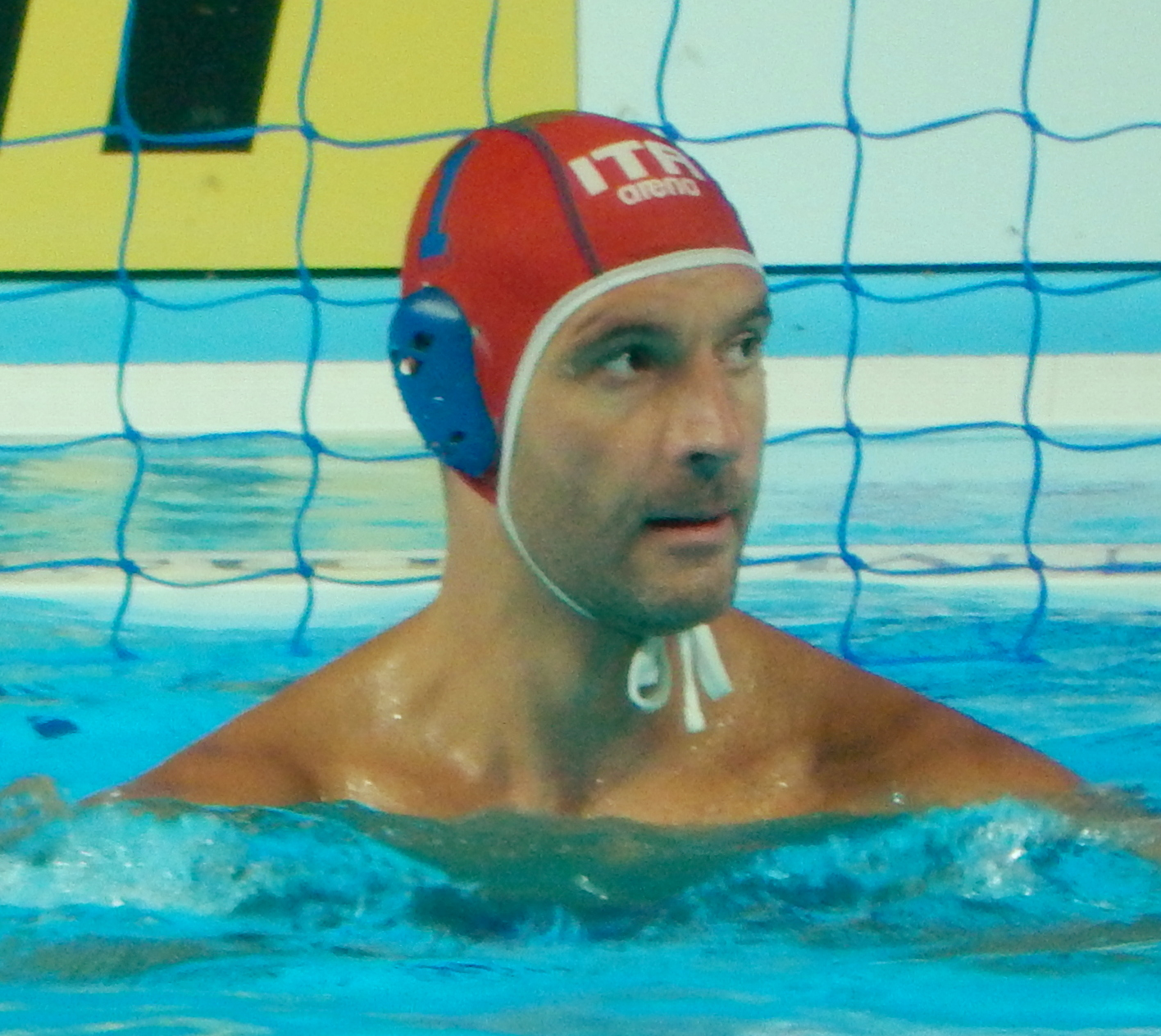
Stefano Tempesti of Italy saved 83 and 87 shots at the 2008 and 2012 Olympics, respectively.

The following table is pre-sorted by edition of the Olympics (in ascending order), number of matches played (in ascending order), name of the goalkeeper (in ascending order), respectively. Last updated: 1 April 2021.

At the 2004 Summer Games, Nikolay Maksimov saved 62 shots, including seven in the bronze medal match, helping Russia win the match.

Stefano Tempesti of Italy blocked 83 shots at the 2008 Olympics. In the 2012 edition, he saved 87 shots, helping the Italian team win the Olympic silver medal.

Slobodan Soro, representing Brazil, saved 81 shots at the 2016 Rio Olympics.

Legend and abbreviation

- Team – Host team
- Player^{‡} – Player who won the tournament with his team
- MP – Matches played
- Eff % – Save efficiency (Saves / Shots)

Male goalkeepers with the most saves in each Olympic tournament (statistics since 1996)
Year	Goalkeeper	Birth	Age	Height	Saves	Shots	Eff %	MP	Saves per match	Men's team	Finish	Ref
1996	Arie van de Bunt	1969	27	1.85 m (6 ft 1 in)	81	154	52.6%	8	10.125	Netherlands	10th of 12 teams	
2000	Dan Hackett	1970	30	1.98 m (6 ft 6 in)	70	135	51.9%	8	8.750	United States	6th of 12 teams	
2004	Nikolay Maksimov	1972	31	1.90 m (6 ft 3 in)	62	104	59.6%	8	7.750	Russia	3rd of 12 teams	
2008	Stefano Tempesti	1979	29	2.05 m (6 ft 9 in)	83	169	49.1%	8	10.375	Italy	9th of 12 teams	
2012	Stefano Tempesti (2)	1979	33	2.05 m (6 ft 9 in)	87	147	59.2%	8	10.875	Italy	2nd of 12 teams	
2016	Slobodan Soro	1978	37	1.96 m (6 ft 5 in)	81	152	53.3%	8	10.125	Brazil	8th of 12 teams	

Sources:

- Official Reports (PDF): 1996 (pp. 56–73);
- Official Results Books (PDF): 2000 (pp. 45–92), 2004 (p. 180), 2008 (p. 175), 2012 (p. 462), 2016 (p. 102).

Top goalkeepers (all-time)

=== Coach statistics ===
Rk	Rank	Ref	Reference	p.	page	pp.	pages

==== Most successful coaches ====
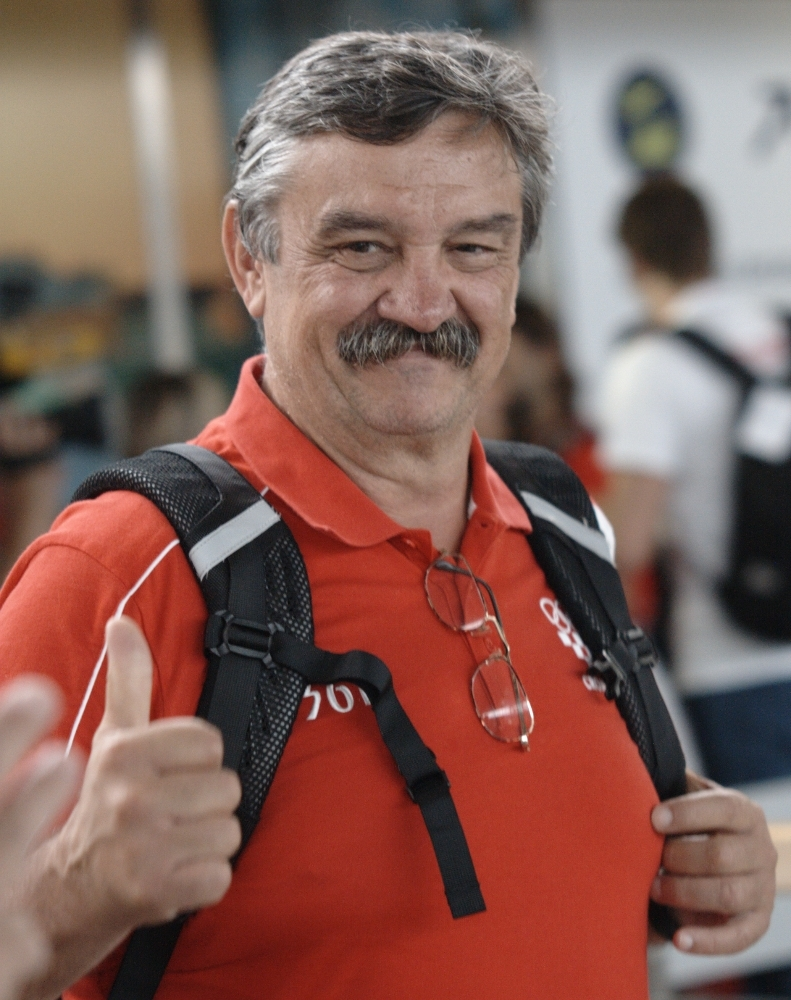
Ratko Rudić coached three men's national teams to four Olympic gold medals (Yugoslavia in 1984 and 1988, Italy in 1992 and Croatia in 2012).

The following table is pre-sorted by total number of Olympic medals (in descending order), number of Olympic gold medals (in descending order), number of Olympic silver medals (in descending order), year of winning the last Olympic medal (in ascending order), year of winning the first Olympic medal (in ascending order), name of the coach (in ascending order), respectively. Last updated: 31 March 2021.

There are four coaches who led men's national water polo teams to win three or more Olympic medals.

Ratko Rudić is the most successful water polo coach in Olympic history. As a head coach, he led three men's national water polo teams to win four Olympic gold medals and one Olympic bronze medal. He guided Yugoslavia men's national team to two consecutive gold medals in 1984 and 1988, Italy men's national team to a gold medal in 1992 and a bronze medal in 1996, and Croatia men's national team to a gold medal in 2012, making him the first and only coach to lead three different men's national water polo teams to the Olympic titles.

Dénes Kemény of Hungary is another coach who led men's national water polo team(s) to win three Olympic gold medals. Under his leadership, the Hungary men's national team won three gold in a row between 2000 and 2008, becoming the second water polo team to have an Olympic winning streak.

Dezső Gyarmati coached the Hungary men's national team to three consecutive Olympic medals, a silver in 1972, a gold in 1976, and a bronze in 1980.

Boris Popov led the Soviet Union men's national team to win an Olympic gold medal in 1980 and a bronze medal in 1988. Four years later, he coached the Unified Team to another bronze medal.

Legend

- – Hosts

Head coaches who led men's national teams to win three or more Olympic medals
Rk	Head coach	Nationality	Birth	Age	Men's team	Tournaments (finish)									Period	Medals				Ref
Rk	Head coach	Nationality	Birth	Age	Men's team	1	2	3	4	5	6	7	8	9	Period	G	S	B	T	Ref
1	Ratko Rudić	Yugoslavia	1948	36–40	Yugoslavia	1984 (1st)	1988 (1st)								32 years	4	0	1	5	
1	Ratko Rudić	Croatia	1948	44–52	Italy			1992 (1st)	1996 (3rd)	2000 (5th)					32 years	4	0	1	5	
1	Ratko Rudić	Croatia	1948	56	United States						2004 (7th)				32 years	4	0	1	5	
1	Ratko Rudić	Croatia	1948	60–64	Croatia							2008 (6th)	2012 (1st)		32 years	4	0	1	5	
1	Ratko Rudić	Croatia	1948	68	Brazil									2016 (8th)	32 years	4	0	1	5	
2	Dénes Kemény	Hungary	1954	46–58	Hungary	2000 (1st)	2004 (1st)	2008 (1st)	2012 (5th)						12 years	3	0	0	3	
3	Dezső Gyarmati	Hungary	1927	44–52	Hungary	1972 (2nd)	1976 (1st)	1980 (3rd)							8 years	1	1	1	3	
4	Boris Popov	Soviet Union	1941	39, 47	Soviet Union	1980 (1st)		1988 (3rd)							12 years	1	0	2	3	
4	Boris Popov	Russia	1941	51	(International Olympic Committee) Unified Team				1992 (3rd)						12 years	1	0	2	3	

==== Medals as coach and player ====
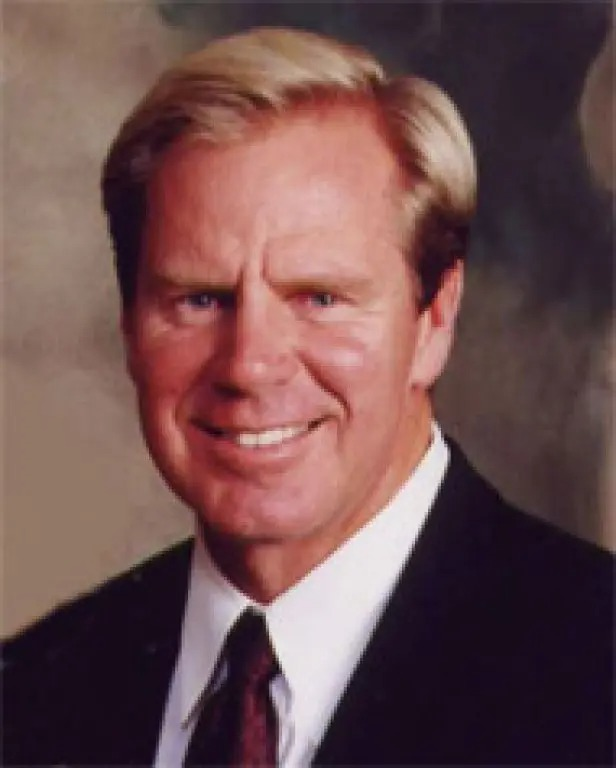
Terry Schroeder of the United States won two Olympic medals in 1984 and 1988, and then coached the United States men's national team to the podium in 2008.

The following table is pre-sorted by total number of Olympic medals (in descending order), number of Olympic gold medals (in descending order), number of Olympic silver medals (in descending order), year of winning the last Olympic medal (in ascending order), year of winning the first Olympic medal (in ascending order), name of the person (in ascending order), respectively. Last updated: 7 May 2021.

Twelve water polo players won Olympic medals and then guided men's national water polo teams to the Olympic podium as head coaches.

Dezső Gyarmati of Hungary won five Olympic medals in a row between 1948 and 1964. He coached the Hungary men's national team to three consecutive Olympic medals, including a gold in 1976, making him the only man to win Olympic gold in water polo as player and head coach in the last 100 years.

Ivo Trumbić won the silver medal in 1964 and Yugoslavia's first Olympic gold medal in water polo in 1968. He moved to the Netherlands in 1973, hired as the head coach of the Netherlands men's national team. At the 1976 Olympics in Montreal, he led the Dutch team to win a bronze medal.

Vladimir Semyonov, representing the Soviet Union, won three Olympic medals in a row between 1960 and 1968. As a head coach, he led the Soviet Union men's national water polo team to win an Olympic gold medal in 1972.

Soviet Boris Popov won a bronze medal at the Tokyo Olympics in 1964. He guided the Soviet Union men's national team to two Olympic medals in 1980 and 1988, and the Unified Team to a bronze medal in 1992.

Aleksandr Kabanov of the Soviet Union won a gold at the Munich Olympics in 1972, coached by Vladimir Semyonov. Eight years later, he won the second gold medal at the Moscow Olympics in 1980, coached by Boris Popov. As a head coach, he led Russia men's national team to win two consecutive medals in 2000 and 2004.

Ratko Rudić won a silver medal for Yugoslavia at the Moscow Olympics in 1980. Upon retirement as an athlete, he immediately entered the coaching ranks. During his career, Rudić guided three different men's national teams to five Olympic medals, more than any other coaches.

Terry Schroeder of the United States won two consecutive silver medals at the 1984 and 1988 Olympics. Twenty years later, he coached the United States men's national team to a silver in 2008, becoming the first and only non-European to achieve this feat.

Italian Alessandro Campagna won a gold medal at the Barcelona Olympics in 1992, coached by Ratko Rudić. As a head coach, he led Italy men's national team to win two medals in 2012 and 2016.

Dejan Savić won three consecutive Olympic medals between 2000 and 2008. At the 2016 Summer Games in Rio de Janeiro, he coached Serbia men's national team to the Olympic title.

Legend

- Year^{*} – As host team

Rk	Person	Birth	Height	Player				Head coach			Total medals				Ref
Rk	Person	Birth	Height	Age	Men's team	Pos	Medal	Age	Men's team	Medal	G	S	B	T	Ref
1	Dezső Gyarmati	1927	1.86 m (6 ft 1 in)	20–36	Hungary	FP	1948 (silver) , 1952 (gold) , 1956 (gold) , 1960 (bronze) , 1964 (gold)	44–52	Hungary	1972 (silver) , 1976 (gold) , 1980 (bronze)	4	2	2	8	
2	Ratko Rudić	1948	1.88 m (6 ft 2 in)	32	Yugoslavia	FP	1980 (silver)	36–40	Yugoslavia	1984 (gold) , 1988 (gold)	4	1	1	6	
2	Ratko Rudić	1948	1.88 m (6 ft 2 in)	32	Yugoslavia	FP	1980 (silver)	44–48	Italy	1992 (gold) , 1996 (bronze)	4	1	1	6	
2	Ratko Rudić	1948	1.88 m (6 ft 2 in)	32	Yugoslavia	FP	1980 (silver)	64	Croatia	2012 (gold)	4	1	1	6	
3	Dejan Savić	1975	1.90 m (6 ft 3 in)	25	FR Yugoslavia	FP	2000 (bronze)	41–46	Serbia	2016 (gold) , 2020 (gold)	2	1	2	5	
3	Dejan Savić	1975	1.90 m (6 ft 3 in)	29	Serbia and Montenegro	FP	2004 (silver)	41–46	Serbia	2016 (gold) , 2020 (gold)	2	1	2	5	
3	Dejan Savić	1975	1.90 m (6 ft 3 in)	33	Serbia	FP	2008 (bronze)	41–46	Serbia	2016 (gold) , 2020 (gold)	2	1	2	5	
4	Aleksandr Kabanov	1948	1.81 m (5 ft 11 in)	24, 32	Soviet Union	FP	1972 (gold) , 1980^{*} (gold)	52–56	Russia	2000 (silver) , 2004 (bronze)	2	1	1	4	
5	Vladimir Semyonov	1938	1.84 m (6 ft 0 in)	22–30	Soviet Union	FP	1960 (silver) , 1964 (bronze) , 1968 (silver)	34	Soviet Union	1972 (gold)	1	2	1	4	
6	Boris Popov	1941	1.81 m (5 ft 11 in)	23	Soviet Union	FP	1964 (bronze)	39, 47	Soviet Union	1980^{*} (gold) , 1988 (bronze)	1	0	3	4	
6	Boris Popov	1941	1.81 m (5 ft 11 in)	23	Soviet Union	FP	1964 (bronze)	51	(International Olympic Committee) Unified Team	1992 (bronze)	1	0	3	4	
7	Dezső Lemhényi	1917		30–34	Hungary	FP	1948 (silver) , 1952 (gold)	42	Hungary	1960 (bronze)	1	1	1	3	
7	Ivo Trumbić	1935	1.97 m (6 ft 6 in)	29–33	Yugoslavia	FP	1964 (silver) , 1968 (gold)	41	Netherlands	1976 (bronze)	1	1	1	3	
7	Alessandro Campagna	1963	1.82 m (6 ft 0 in)	29	Italy	FP	1992 (gold)	49–53	Italy	2012 (silver) , 2016 (bronze)	1	1	1	3	
10	Terry Schroeder	1958	1.90 m (6 ft 3 in)	25–29	United States	FP	1984^{*} (silver) , 1988 (silver)	49	United States	2008 (silver)	0	3	0	3	
11	Gianni Lonzi	1938	1.82 m (6 ft 0 in)	22	Italy	FP	1960^{*} (gold)	37	Italy	1976 (silver)	1	1	0	2	
12	Mario Majoni	1910		38	Italy	FP	1948^{*} (gold)	42	Italy	1952 (bronze)	1	0	1	2	
Rk	Person	Birth	Height	Age	Men's team	Pos	Medal	Age	Men's team	Medal	G	S	B	T	Ref
Rk	Person	Birth	Height	Player				Head coach			Total medals				Ref

== Women's tournament ==
=== Results summary ===
Year	Hosts	Gold medal game			Bronze medal game			Number of teams
Year	Hosts	Gold	Score	Silver	Bronze	Score	4th place	Number of teams
2000	(Australia); Sydney	Australia	4–3	United States	Russia	4–3	Netherlands	6
2004	(Greece); Athens	Italy	10–9 (aet)	Greece	United States	6–5	Australia	8
2008	(China); Beijing	Netherlands	9–8	United States	Australia	9–9 (aet) (3–2) (ps)	Hungary	8
2012	(United Kingdom); London	United States	8–5	Spain	Australia	13–11 (aet)	Hungary	8
2016	(Brazil); Rio	United States	12–5	Italy	Russia	12–12 (7–6) (ps)	Hungary	8
2020	(Japan); Tokyo	United States	14–5	Spain	Hungary	11–9	ROC	10
2024	(France); Paris	Spain	11–9	Australia	Netherlands	11–10	United States	10
2028	(United States); Los Angeles							12

|} Sources:

- Official Results Books (PDF): 2000–2016 (women's tournaments);
- Olympedia: 2000–2016 (women's tournaments);
- Sports Reference: 2000–2016 (women's tournaments).

=== Confederation statistics ===
==== Best performances by tournament ====
This is a summary of the best performances of each confederation in each tournament. Last updated: 7 August 2021.

Legend

- 1st – Champions
- 2nd – Runners-up
- 3rd – Third place
- 4th – Fourth place
- Q – Qualified for forthcoming tournament

Confederation	2000	2004	2008	2012	2016	2020	2024
Africa – CANA	—	—	—	—	—	10th	—
Americas – UANA	2nd	3rd	2nd	1st	1st	1st	4th
Asia – AASF	6th	8th	5th	5th	7th	8th	10th
Europe – LEN	3rd	1st	1st	2nd	2nd	2nd	1st
Oceania – OSA	1st	4th	3rd	3rd	6th	5th	2nd
Total teams	6	8	8	8	8	10	10

=== Team statistics ===
Rk	Rank	Ref	Reference	p.	page	pp.	pages

==== Comprehensive team results by tournament ====
Note: Results of Olympic qualification tournaments are not included.

Legend

- 1st – Champions
- 2nd – Runners-up
- 3rd – Third place
- 4th – Fourth place
- Q – Qualified for forthcoming tournament
- – Hosts

Abbreviation

- stats – Olympic water polo team statistics

Africa – CANA (1 team)
Women's team	2000	2004	2008	2012	2016	2020	2024	Years
South Africa						10th	WD	1
Americas – UANA (3 teams)
Women's team	2000	2004	2008	2012	2016	2020	2024	Years
Brazil					8th			1
Canada (stats)	5th	7th				7th	8th	4
United States (stats)	2nd	3rd	2nd	1st	1st	1st	4th	7
Asia – AASF (3 teams)
Women's team	2000	2004	2008	2012	2016	2020	2024	Years
China (stats)			5th	5th	7th	8th	10th	5
Japan						9th		1
Kazakhstan	6th	8th						2
Europe – LEN (9 teams)
Women's team	2000	2004	2008	2012	2016	2020	2024	Years
France							9th	1
Great Britain				8th				1
Greece (stats)		2nd	8th				7th	3
Hungary (stats)		6th	4th	4th	4th	3rd	5th	6
Italy (stats)		1st	6th	7th	2nd		6th	5
Netherlands (stats)	4th		1st			6th	3rd	4
ROC (stats)						4th		1
Russia (stats)	3rd	5th	7th	6th	3rd			5
Spain (stats)				2nd	5th	2nd	1st	4
Oceania – OSA (1 team)
Women's team	2000	2004	2008	2012	2016	2020	2024	Years
Australia (stats)	1st	4th	3rd	3rd	6th	5th	2nd	7
Total teams	6	8	8	8	8	10	10	

==== Finishes in the top four ====
The following table is pre-sorted by total finishes in the top four (in descending order), number of Olympic gold medals (in descending order), number of Olympic silver medals (in descending order), number of Olympic bronze medals (in descending order), name of the team (in ascending order), respectively. Last updated: 7 August 2021.

Legend

- Year^{*} – As host team

Rk	Women's team	Total	Champions	Runners-up	Third place	Fourth place	First	Last
1	United States	6	3 (2012, 2016, 2020)	2 (2000, 2008)	1 (2004)	1 (2024)	2000	2024
2	Australia	5	1 (2000^{*})	1 (2024)	3 (2008, 2012)	1 (2004)	2000	2024
3	Hungary	4			1 (2020)	3 (2008, 2012, 2016)	2008	2020
4	Spain	3	1 (2024)	2 (2012, 2020)			2012	2024
5	Netherlands	3	1 (2008)		1 (2024)	1 (2000)	2000	2024
6	Italy	2	1 (2004)	1 (2016)			2004	2016
7	Russia	2			2 (2000, 2016)		2000	2016
8	Greece	1		1 (2004^{*})			2004	2004
9	ROC	1				1 (2020)	2020	2020
Rk	Women's team	Total	Champions	Runners-up	Third place	Fourth place	First	Last

==== Medal table ====
The following table is pre-sorted by number of Olympic gold medals (in descending order), number of Olympic silver medals (in descending order), number of Olympic bronze medals (in descending order), name of the team (in ascending order), respectively. Last updated: 7 August 2021.

The United States is the most successful country in the women's Olympic water polo tournament, with three gold, two silver and one bronze.

Rank	Women's team	Gold	Silver	Bronze	Total
1	United States (USA)	3	2	1	6
2	Spain (ESP)	1	2	0	3
3	Australia (AUS)	1	1	2	4
4	Italy (ITA)	1	1	0	2
5	Netherlands (NED)	1	0	1	2
6	Greece (GRE)	0	1	0	1
7	Russia (RUS)	0	0	2	2
8	Hungary (HUN)	0	0	1	1
Totals (8 entries)		7	7	7	21

==== Champions (results, squads) ====
Champions (results) The following table shows results of Olympic champions in women's water polo by tournament. Last updated: 7 August 2021.

Legend

- 6 – Winning 6 matches during the tournament
- 4 – Drawing 4 matches during the tournament
- 2 – Losing 2 matches during the tournament
- 100.0% – Winning all matches during the tournament
- Team – Olympic winning streak (winning three or more Olympic titles in a row)
- Team – Host team

Abbreviation

- MP – Matches played
- W – Won
- D – Drawn
- L – Lost
- GF – Goals for
- GA – Goals against
- GD – Goals difference
- GF/MP – Goals for per match
- GA/MP – Goals against per match
- GD/MP – Goals difference per match

Results of champions by tournament
#	Women's tournament	Champions	MP	W	D	L	Win %	GF	GA	GD	GF/MP	GA/MP	GD/MP
1	Sydney 2000	Australia (1st title)	7	6	0	1	85.7%	46	29	17	6.571	4.143	2.429
2	Athens 2004	Italy (1st title)	6	5	0	1	83.3%	44	33	11	7.333	5.500	1.833
3	Beijing 2008	Netherlands (1st title)	6	4	0	2	66.7%	57	53	4	9.500	8.833	0.667
4	London 2012	United States (1st title)	6	5	1	0	83.3%	58	48	10	9.667	8.000	1.667
5	Rio 2016	United States (2nd title)	6	6	0	0	100.0%	73	32	41	12.167	5.333	6.833
6	Tokyo 2020	United States (3rd title)	7	6	0	1	85.7%	109	47	62	15.571	6.714	8.857
7	Paris 2024	Spain (1st title)	7	7	0	0	100.0%	94	67	27	13.428	9.571	3.857
#	Women's tournament	Total	45	39	1	5	86.6%	481	309	172	10.688	6.866	3.822
#	Women's tournament	Champions	MP	W	D	L	Win %	GF	GA	GD	GF/MP	GA/MP	GD/MP

Sources:

- Official Results Books (PDF): 2000 (p. 96), 2004 (p. 72), 2008 (p. 71), 2012 (p. 368), 2016 (p. 218), 2020 (p. 273);
- Olympedia: 2000–2020 (women's tournaments).

Champions (squads) The following table shows number of players and average age, height and weight of Olympic champions in women's water polo by tournament. Last updated: 7 August 2021.

Legend

- Team – Olympic winning streak
- Team – Winning all matches during the tournament
- Team – Host team

Winning squads by tournament
#	Women's tournament	Champions	Players	Returning Olympians		Average		
#	Women's tournament	Champions	Number	Number	%	Age	Height	Weight
1	Sydney 2000	Australia (1st title)	13	0	0.0%	26 years, 215 days	1.78 m (5 ft 10 in)	71 kg (157 lb)
2	Athens 2004	Italy (1st title)	13	0	0.0%	28 years, 301 days	1.73 m (5 ft 8 in)	67 kg (148 lb)
3	Beijing 2008	Netherlands (1st title)	13	2	15.4%	25 years, 248 days	1.77 m (5 ft 10 in)	70 kg (154 lb)
4	London 2012	United States (1st title)	13	8	61.5%	26 years, 96 days	1.80 m (5 ft 11 in)	77 kg (170 lb)
5	Rio 2016	United States (2nd title)	13	4	30.8%	23 years, 200 days	1.80 m (5 ft 11 in)	77 kg (170 lb)
6	Tokyo 2020	United States (3rd title)	13	8	61.5%	26 years, 33 days	1.79 m (5 ft 10 in)	
6	Paris 2024	Spain (1st title)	13	8	61.5%			
#	Women's tournament	Champions	Number	Number	%	Age	Height	Weight
#	Women's tournament	Champions	Players	Returning Olympians		Average		

Sources:

- Official Results Books (PDF): 2000 (p. 96), 2004 (p. 73), 2008 (p. 72), 2012 (p. 369), 2016 (p. 219), 2020 (p. 274);
- Olympedia: 2000–2020 (women's tournaments).

=== Player statistics ===
Rk	Rank	Ref	Reference	(C)	Captain
Pos	Playing position	FP	Field player	GK	Goalkeeper
L/R	Handedness	L	Left-handed	R	Right-handed
p.	page	pp.	pages		

==== Multiple appearances (four-time Olympians) ====
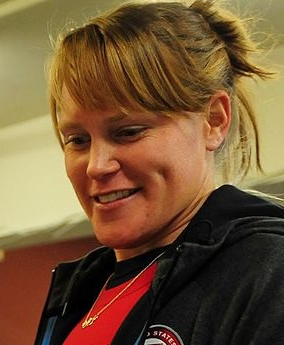
American water polo player Heather Petri competed at four Olympics (2000–2012).

The following table is pre-sorted by number of Olympic appearances (in descending order), year of the last Olympic appearance (in ascending order), year of the first Olympic appearance (in ascending order), date of birth (in ascending order), name of the player (in ascending order), respectively. Last updated: 7 August 2021.

Eight female athletes competed in water polo at four or more Olympic Games between 2000 and 2020 inclusive.

Legend

- – Hosts
- Apps – Appearances

Female athletes who competed in water polo at four or more Olympics
Apps	Player	Birth	Height	Women's team	Pos	Water polo tournaments					Period (age of first/last)	Medals				Ref
Apps	Player	Birth	Height	Women's team	Pos	1	2	3	4	5	Period (age of first/last)	G	S	B	T	Ref
4	Heather Petri	1978	1.80 m (5 ft 11 in)	United States	FP	2000	2004	2008	2012		12 years (22/34)	1	2	1	4	
4	Sofia Konukh	1980	1.73 m (5 ft 8 in)	Russia	FP	2000	2004	2008	2012		12 years (20/32)	0	0	1	1	
4	Brenda Villa	1980	1.63 m (5 ft 4 in)	United States	FP	2000	2004	2008	2012		12 years (20/32)	1	2	1	4	
4	Tania Di Mario	1979	1.68 m (5 ft 6 in)	Italy	FP	2004	2008	2012	2016		12 years (25/37)	1	1	0	2	
4	Bronwen Knox	1986	1.82 m (6 ft 0 in)	Australia	FP	2008	2012	2016	2020		13 years (22/35)	0	0	2	2	
4	Nadezhda Glyzina	1988	1.75 m (5 ft 9 in)	Russia	FP	2008	2012	2016			13 years (20/33)	0	0	1	1	
4	Nadezhda Glyzina	1988	1.75 m (5 ft 9 in)	ROC	FP				2020		13 years (20/33)	0	0	1	1	
4	Evgenia Soboleva	1988	1.80 m (5 ft 11 in)	Russia	FP	2008	2012	2016			13 years (19/32)	0	0	1	1	
4	Evgenia Soboleva	1988	1.80 m (5 ft 11 in)	ROC	FP				2020		13 years (19/32)	0	0	1	1	
4	Ekaterina Prokofyeva	1991	1.76 m (5 ft 9 in)	Russia	FP	2008	2012	2016			13 years (17/30)	0	0	1	1	
4	Ekaterina Prokofyeva	1991	1.76 m (5 ft 9 in)	ROC	FP				2020		13 years (17/30)	0	0	1	1	
Apps	Player	Birth	Height	Women's team	Pos	1	2	3	4	5	Period (age of first/last)	G	S	B	T	Ref
Apps	Player	Birth	Height	Women's team	Pos	Water polo tournaments					Period (age of first/last)	Medals				Ref

==== Multiple medalists ====
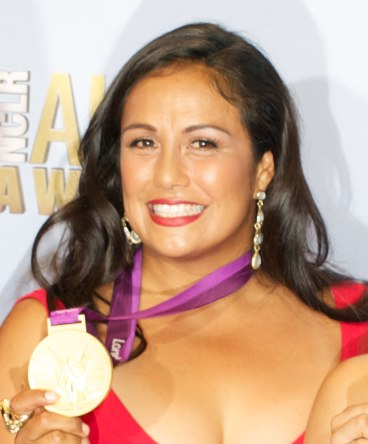
Brenda Villa of the United States won four Olympic medals in water polo between 2000 and 2012.

The following table is pre-sorted by total number of Olympic medals (in descending order), number of Olympic gold medals (in descending order), number of Olympic silver medals (in descending order), year of receiving the last Olympic medal (in ascending order), year of receiving the first Olympic medal (in ascending order), name of the player (in ascending order), respectively. Last updated: 7 August 2021.

Heather Petri and Brenda Villa, both representing the United States, are the only two female athletes to win four Olympic medals in water polo.

Legend

- – Hosts

Female athletes who won four or more Olympic medals in water polo
Rk	Player	Birth	Height	Women's team	Pos	Water polo tournaments					Period (age of first/last)	Medals				Ref
Rk	Player	Birth	Height	Women's team	Pos	1	2	3	4	5	Period (age of first/last)	G	S	B	T	Ref
1	Heather Petri	1978	1.80 m (5 ft 11 in)	United States	FP	2000	2004	2008	2012		12 years (22/34)	1	2	1	4	
1	Brenda Villa	1980	1.63 m (5 ft 4 in)	United States	FP	2000	2004	2008	2012		12 years (20/32)	1	2	1	4	

Sources:

- Sports Reference: Athlete Medal Leaders (1900–2016);
- Official Results Books (PDF): 2000 (p. 28), 2004 (p. 2), 2008 (p. 2), 2012 (p. 285), 2016 (p. 135), 2020 (p. 156).

==== Multiple gold medalists ====
The following table is pre-sorted by number of Olympic gold medals (in descending order), number of Olympic silver medals (in descending order), number of Olympic bronze medals (in descending order), year of receiving the last Olympic gold medal (in ascending order), year of receiving the first Olympic gold medal (in ascending order), name of the player (in ascending order), respectively. Last updated: 7 August 2021.

Two female athletes won three or more Olympic gold medals in water polo. They were both members of the United States women's national water polo team that won three consecutive Olympic gold medals in 2012, 2016 and 2021.

Legend

- – Hosts

Female athletes who won three or more Olympic gold medals in water polo
Rk	Player	Birth	Height	Women's team	Pos	Water polo tournaments					Period (age of first/last)	Medals				Ref
Rk	Player	Birth	Height	Women's team	Pos	1	2	3	4	5	Period (age of first/last)	G	S	B	T	Ref
1	Melissa Seidemann	1990	1.83 m (6 ft 0 in)	United States	FP	2012	2016	2020			9 years (22/31)	3	0	0	3	
1	Maggie Steffens	1993	1.73 m (5 ft 8 in)	United States	FP	2012	2016	2020			9 years (19/28)	3	0	0	3	

==== Top goalscorers (one match, one tournament, all-time) ====
Top goalscorers (one match)

Top goalscorers (one tournament)

The following table is pre-sorted by number of goals (in descending order), edition of the Olympics (in ascending order), number of matches played (in ascending order), name of the player (in ascending order), respectively. Last updated: 12 August 2021.

Seven female players have scored 18 or more goals in an Olympic water polo tournament.

At the 2020 Summer Olympics, Dutch left-hander Simone van de Kraats scored 28 goals, setting the record for the most goals scored by a female water polo player in a single Olympic tournament.

Maggie Steffens of the United States is the first and only female water polo player to achieve this feat twice. At the 2012 Summer Olympics, Steffens netted 21 goals. Nine years later, she scored 18 goals in Tokyo.

Legend

- Team – Host team
- Player^{‡} – Player who won the tournament with her team

Female players with 18 or more goals in an Olympic tournament
Rk	Year	Player	Birth	Age	Height	L/R	Goals	Matches played	Goals per match	Women's team	Finish	Ref
1	2020	Simone van de Kraats	2000	20	1.80 m (5 ft 11 in)	Left	28	7	4.000	Netherlands	6th of 10 teams	
2	2012	Maggie Steffens^{‡}	1993	19	1.73 m (5 ft 8 in)	Right	21	6	3.500	United States	1st of 8 teams	
3	2012	Ma Huanhuan	1990	22	1.78 m (5 ft 10 in)	Right	19	6	3.167	China	5th of 8 teams	
4	2012	Tania Di Mario	1979	33	1.68 m (5 ft 6 in)	Right	18	6	3.000	Italy	7th of 8 teams	
4	2020	Maddie Musselman^{‡}	1998	23	1.80 m (5 ft 11 in)	Right	18	7	2.571	United States	1st of 10 teams	
4	2020	Beatriz Ortiz	1995	26	1.76 m (5 ft 9 in)	Right	18	7	2.571	Spain	2nd of 10 teams	
4	2020	Maggie Steffens^{‡} (2)	1993	28	1.73 m (5 ft 8 in)	Right	18	7	2.571	United States	1st of 10 teams	
Rk	Year	Player	Birth	Age	Height	L/R	Goals	Matches played	Goals per match	Women's team	Finish	Ref

- Official Results Books (PDF): 2000 (pp. 96–101), 2004 (p. 53), 2008 (p. 54), 2012 (p. 345), 2016 (p. 193), 2020 (p. 234).

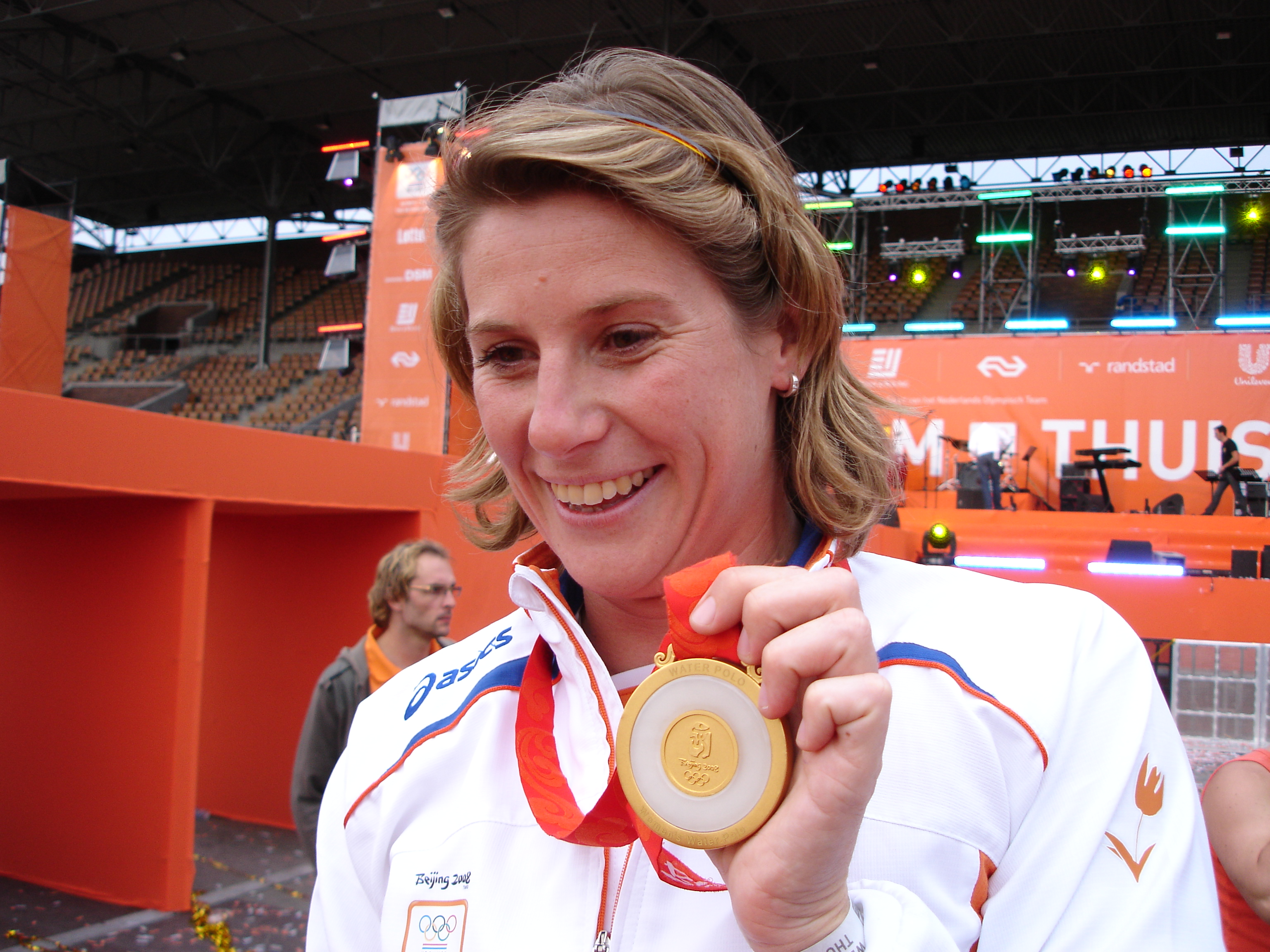
Daniëlle de Bruijn of the Netherlands scored 11 and 17 goals at the 2000 and 2008 Olympics, respectively.

The following table is pre-sorted by edition of the Olympics (in ascending order), number of matches played (in ascending order), name of the player (in ascending order), respectively. Last updated: 12 August 2021.

At 19 years old, Maggie Steffens of the United States made her Olympic debut at the 2012 London Olympics, where she was the youngest-ever female top goalscorer with 21 goals. She was also the top goalscorer at the 2016 Rio Olympics, with 17 goals.

Dutch left-handed player Daniëlle de Bruijn was the joint top goalscorer at the 2000 Olympics, with 11 goals. Eight years later she netted 17 goals, including seven goals in the gold medal match, becoming the top goalscorer at the 2008 Olympics.

Legend

- Team – Host team
- Player^{‡} – Player who won the tournament with her team

Female players with the most goals in each Olympic tournament
Year	Player	Birth	Age	Height	L/R	Goals	Matches played	Goals per match	Women's team	Finish	Ref
2000	Daniëlle de Bruijn	1978	22	1.72 m (5 ft 8 in)	Left	11	7	1.571	Netherlands	4th of 6 teams	
2000	Bridgette Gusterson^{‡}	1973	27	1.80 m (5 ft 11 in)	Right	11	7	1.571	Australia	1st of 6 teams	
2000	Sofia Konukh	1980	20	1.73 m (5 ft 8 in)	Right	11	7	1.571	Russia	3rd of 6 teams	
2004	Tania Di Mario^{‡}	1979	25	1.68 m (5 ft 6 in)	Right	14	6	2.333	Italy	1st of 8 teams	
2008	Daniëlle de Bruijn^{‡} (2)	1978	30	1.72 m (5 ft 8 in)	Left	17	6	2.833	Netherlands	1st of 8 teams	
2012	Maggie Steffens^{‡}	1993	19	1.73 m (5 ft 8 in)	Right	21	6	3.500	United States	1st of 8 teams	
2016	Maggie Steffens^{‡} (2)	1993	23	1.73 m (5 ft 8 in)	Right	17	6	2.833	United States	1st of 8 teams	
2020	Simone van de Kraats	2000	20	1.80 m (5 ft 11 in)	Left	28	7	4.000	Netherlands	6th of 10 teams	

- Official Results Books (PDF): 2000 (pp. 96–101), 2004 (p. 53), 2008 (p. 54), 2012 (p. 345), 2016 (p. 193), 2020 (p. 234).

Top goalscorers (all-time)

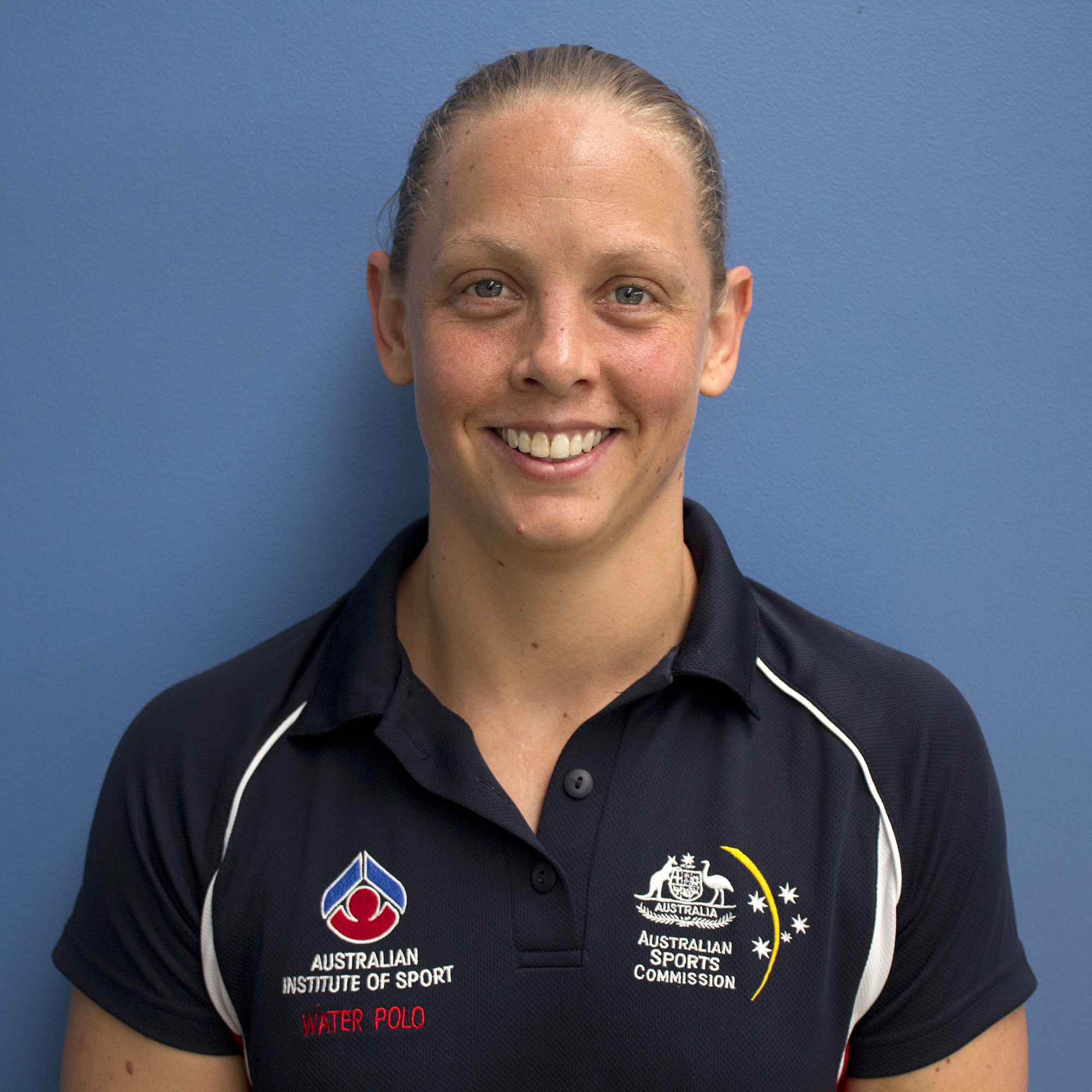
Kate Gynther of Australia scored 30 goals at three Olympics (2004–2012).

The following table is pre-sorted by number of total goals (in descending order), number of total Olympic matches played (in ascending order), date of the last Olympic match played (in ascending order), date of the first Olympic match played (in ascending order), name of the player (in ascending order), respectively. Last updated: 7 August 2021.

Three-time Olympian Maggie Steffens of the United States holds the record for the most goals scored by a female water polo player in Olympic history, with 56 goals.

Italian Tania Di Mario netted 47 goals at four Olympics (2004–2016).

Ma Huanhuan, representing China, holds the record for the most goals scored by an Asian female water polo player in Olympic history, with 37 goals at three Olympics (2008–2016).

Kate Gynther of Australia netted 30 goals in 32 matches between 2004 and 2012.

Legend

- – Hosts

All-time female players with 30 or more goals at the Olympics
Rk	Player	Birth	Height	L/R	Women's team	Total goals	Total matches played	Goals per match	Tournaments (goals)				Period (age of first/last)	Medals				Ref
Rk	Player	Birth	Height	L/R	Women's team	Total goals	Total matches played	Goals per match	1	2	3	4	Period (age of first/last)	G	S	B	T	Ref
1	Maggie Steffens	1993	1.73 m (5 ft 8 in)	Right	United States	56	19	2.947	2012 (21)	2016 (17)	2020 (18)		9 years (19/28)	3	0	0	3	
2	Tania Di Mario	1979	1.68 m (5 ft 6 in)	Right	Italy	47	23	2.043	2004 (14)	2008 (10)	2012 (18)	2016 (5)	12 years (25/37)	1	1	0	2	
3	Ma Huanhuan	1990	1.78 m (5 ft 10 in)	Right	China	37	17	2.176	2008 (7)	2012 (19)	2016 (11)		8 years (18/26)	0	0	0	0	
4	Sofia Konukh	1980	1.73 m (5 ft 8 in)	Right	Russia	31	22	1.409	2000 (11)	2004 (9)	2008 (7)	2012 (4)	12 years (20/32)	0	0	1	1	
5	Brenda Villa	1980	1.63 m (5 ft 4 in)	Right	United States	31	23	1.348	2000 (9)	2004 (7)	2008 (9)	2012 (6)	12 years (20/32)	1	2	1	4	
6	Kate Gynther	1982	1.75 m (5 ft 9 in)	Right	Australia	30	17	1.765	2004 (7)	2008 (13)	2012 (10)		8 years (22/30)	0	0	2	2	

- Official Results Books (PDF): 2000 (pp. 96–101), 2004 (p. 53), 2008 (p. 54), 2012 (p. 345), 2016 (p. 193).

==== Top goalkeepers (one match, one tournament, all-time) ====
Top goalkeepers (one match)

Top goalkeepers (one tournament)

The following table is pre-sorted by number of saves (in descending order), edition of the Olympics (in ascending order), number of matches played (in ascending order), name of the goalkeeper (in ascending order), respectively. Last updated: 1 April 2021.

Six female goalkeepers have saved 50 or more shots in an Olympic water polo tournament.

Giulia Gorlero of Italy holds the record for the most saves by a female water polo goalkeeper in a single Olympic tournament, blocking 65 shots in the 2016 edition.

At the 2016 Summer Games, Ashleigh Johnson saved 51 shots, including nine in the gold medal match, helping the American team win the Olympics. She is the most efficient one among these six goalkeepers.

Legend and abbreviation

- Team – Host team
- Player^{‡} – Player who won the tournament with her team
- MP – Matches played
- Eff % – Save efficiency (Saves / Shots)
- 64.6% – Highest save efficiency

Female goalkeepers with 50 or more saves in an Olympic tournament
Rk	Year	Goalkeeper	Birth	Age	Height	Saves	Shots	Eff %	MP	Saves per match	Women's team	Finish	Ref
1	2016	Giulia Gorlero	1990	25	1.80 m (5 ft 11 in)	65	106	61.3%	6	10.833	Italy	2nd of 8 teams	
2	2012	Elena Gigli	1985	27	1.92 m (6 ft 4 in)	56	105	53.3%	6	9.333	Italy	7th of 8 teams	
3	2016	Yang Jun	1988	28	1.80 m (5 ft 11 in)	55	118	46.6%	6	9.167	China	7th of 8 teams	
4	2012	Rosemary Morris	1986	26	1.80 m (5 ft 11 in)	54	113	47.8%	6	9.000	Great Britain	8th of 8 teams	
5	2012	Elizabeth Armstrong^{‡}	1983	29	1.92 m (6 ft 4 in)	53	101	52.5%	6	8.833	United States	1st of 8 teams	
6	2016	Ashleigh Johnson^{‡}	1994	21	1.86 m (6 ft 1 in)	51	79	64.6%	6	8.500	United States	1st of 8 teams	

- Official Results Books (PDF): 2000 (pp. 96–101), 2004 (p. 49), 2008 (p. 50), 2012 (p. 341), 2016 (p. 195).

The following table is pre-sorted by edition of the Olympics (in ascending order), number of matches played (in ascending order), name of the goalkeeper (in ascending order), respectively. Last updated: 1 April 2021.

At the 2004 Summer Games, Jacqueline Frank saved 41 shots, including seven in the bronze medal match, helping the United States win the match.

Giulia Gorlero of Italy blocked 65 shots at the 2016 Olympics, helping the Italian team win the Olympic silver medal.

Legend and abbreviation

- Team – Host team
- Player^{‡} – Player who won the tournament with her team
- MP – Matches played
- Eff % – Save efficiency (Saves / Shots)

Female goalkeepers with the most saves in each Olympic tournament
Year	Goalkeeper	Birth	Age	Height	Saves	Shots	Eff %	MP	Saves per match	Women's team	Finish	Ref
2000	Karla Plugge	1968	31	1.81 m (5 ft 11 in)	45	81	55.6%	7	6.429	Netherlands	4th of 6 teams	
2004	Jacqueline Frank	1980	24	1.80 m (5 ft 11 in)	41	68	60.3%	5	8.200	United States	3rd of 8 teams	
2008	Elizabeth Armstrong	1983	25	1.88 m (6 ft 2 in)	49	92	53.3%	5	9.800	United States	2nd of 8 teams	
2012	Elena Gigli	1985	27	1.92 m (6 ft 4 in)	56	105	53.3%	6	9.333	Italy	7th of 8 teams	
2016	Giulia Gorlero	1990	25	1.80 m (5 ft 11 in)	65	106	61.3%	6	10.833	Italy	2nd of 8 teams	

- Official Results Books (PDF): 2000 (pp. 96–101), 2004 (p. 49), 2008 (p. 50), 2012 (p. 341), 2016 (p. 195).

Top goalkeepers (all-time)

=== Coach statistics ===
Rk	Rank	Ref	Reference	p.	page	pp.	pages

==== Most successful coaches ====
The following table is pre-sorted by total number of Olympic medals (in descending order), number of Olympic gold medals (in descending order), number of Olympic silver medals (in descending order), year of winning the last Olympic medal (in ascending order), year of winning the first Olympic medal (in ascending order), name of the coach (in ascending order), respectively. Last updated: 31 March 2021.

There are three coaches who led women's national water polo teams to win two or more Olympic medals.

Guy Baker guided the United States women's national team to three Olympic medals in a row between 2000 and 2008.

Adam Krikorian coached the United States women's national team to three consecutive Olympic gold medals in 2012, 2016 and 2024.

Miki Oca guided Spain women's national team to three Olympic medals between 2012 and 2024, including one gold.

Greg McFadden led Australia women's national team to win two consecutive Olympic bronze medals in 2008 and 2012.

Legend

- – Hosts

Head coaches who led women's national teams to win two or more Olympic medals
Rk	Head coach	Nationality	Birth	Age	Women's team	Tournaments (finish)				Period	Medals				Ref
Rk	Head coach	Nationality	Birth	Age	Women's team	1	2	3	4	Period	G	S	B	T	Ref
1	Adam Krikorian	United States	1974	38–42	United States	2012 (1st)	2016 (1st)	2020 (1st) |	12 years	3	0	0	3		
2	Miki Oca	Spain	1970	42–54	Spain	2012 (2nd)		2020 (2nd)	2024 (1st)		12 years	1	2	0	3
3	Guy Baker	United States	1961	65	United States	2000 (2nd)	2004 (3rd)	2008 (2nd)		8 years	0	2	1	3	
4	Greg McFadden	Australia	1964	43–51	Australia	2008 (3rd)	2012 (3rd)	2016 (6th)		8 years		0	0	2	2

==== Medals as coach and player ====
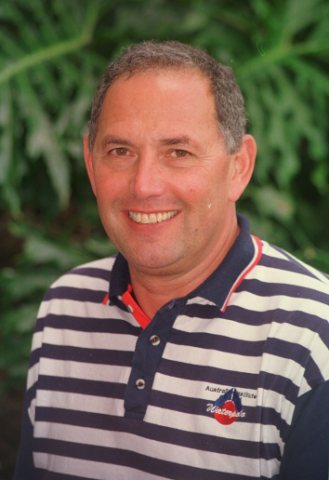
István Görgényi of Hungary won an Olympic medal in 1972, and then coached the Australia women's team to gold in 2000.

The following table is pre-sorted by total number of Olympic medals (in descending order), number of Olympic gold medals (in descending order), number of Olympic silver medals (in descending order), year of winning the last Olympic medal (in ascending order), year of winning the first Olympic medal (in ascending order), name of the person (in ascending order), respectively. Last updated: 31 March 2021.

As of 2016, two water polo players won Olympic medals and then guided women's national water polo teams to the Olympic podium as head coaches.

With the Hungary men's national water polo team, István Görgényi won a silver medal at the 1972 Summer Olympics in Munich. He was appointed head coach of the Australia women's national team in 1998. At the 2000 Sydney Olympics, he led the team to win the inaugural women's water polo gold medal.

Spanish water polo player Miki Oca won a silver medal at the 1992 Summer Olympics in Barcelona. Four years later, he won a gold medal at the 1996 Olympics in Atlanta. As a head coach, he guided Spain women's national water polo team to a gold medal at the 2024 Paris Olympics, and silver medals at London 2012 and Tokyo 2020.

Legend

- Year^{*} – As host team

Rk	Person	Birth	Height	Player				Head coach			Total medals				Ref
Rk	Person	Birth	Height	Age	Men's team	Pos	Medal	Age	Women's team	Medal	G	S	B	T	Ref
1	Miki Oca	1970	1.87 m (6 ft 2 in)	22–26	Spain	FP	1992^{*} (silver) , 1996 (gold)	42	Spain	2024 (gold); 2012, 2020 (silver)	2	3	0	5	
2	István Görgényi	1946	1.87 m (6 ft 2 in)	25	Hungary	FP	1972 (silver)	53	Australia	2000^{*} (gold)	1	1	0	2	

== Overall medal table ==
The following table is pre-sorted by number of Olympic gold medals (in descending order), number of Olympic silver medals (in descending order), number of Olympic bronze medals (in descending order), name of the NOC (in ascending order), respectively. Last updated: 31 December 2021.

Italy is the only country to win both the men's and women's water polo tournaments at the Summer Olympics. Italy men's national team won gold medals at the 1948, 1960 and 1992 Olympics, while the women's team was Olympic champions in 2004.

Legend

- NOC^{◊} – NOC that won medals in both the men's and women's tournaments
- NOC^{†} – Defunct NOC

Rank	NOC	Gold	Silver	Bronze	Total
1	Hungary^{◊}	9	3	5	17
2	United States^{◊}	4	6	5	15
3	Italy^{◊}	4	3	3	10
4	Great Britain	4	0	0	4
5	Yugoslavia^{†}	3	4	0	7
6	Serbia	3	0	2	5
7	Spain^{◊}	2	3	0	5
8	Soviet Union^{†}	2	2	3	7
9	Croatia	1	3	0	4
10	Germany	1	2	0	3
11	France	1	0	3	4
11	Netherlands^{◊}	1	0	3	4
13	Australia	1	0	2	3
14	Belgium	0	4	2	6
15	Greece^{◊}	0	2	0	2
16	Russia^{◊}	0	1	3	4
17	Sweden	0	1	2	3
18	Serbia and Montenegro^{†}	0	1	1	2
19	Unified Team^{†}	0	0	1	1
19	West Germany^{†}	0	0	1	1
Totals (20 entries)		36	35	36	107

=== Winning two medals in one edition of the Games ===
As of the 2024 Summer Olympics, four NOCs won two medals in one edition of the Games.

Legend

- – Hosts

Year	Nation	Men's tournament	Women's tournament
2000	Russia	silver	bronze
2004	No NOC won both editions of the Year.		
2008	United States	silver	silver
2012	No NOC won both editions of the Year.		
2016	Italy	bronze	silver
2020	Hungary	bronze	bronze
2024	No NOC won both editions of the Year.		

== Water polo people at the opening and closing ceremonies ==
=== Flag bearers ===
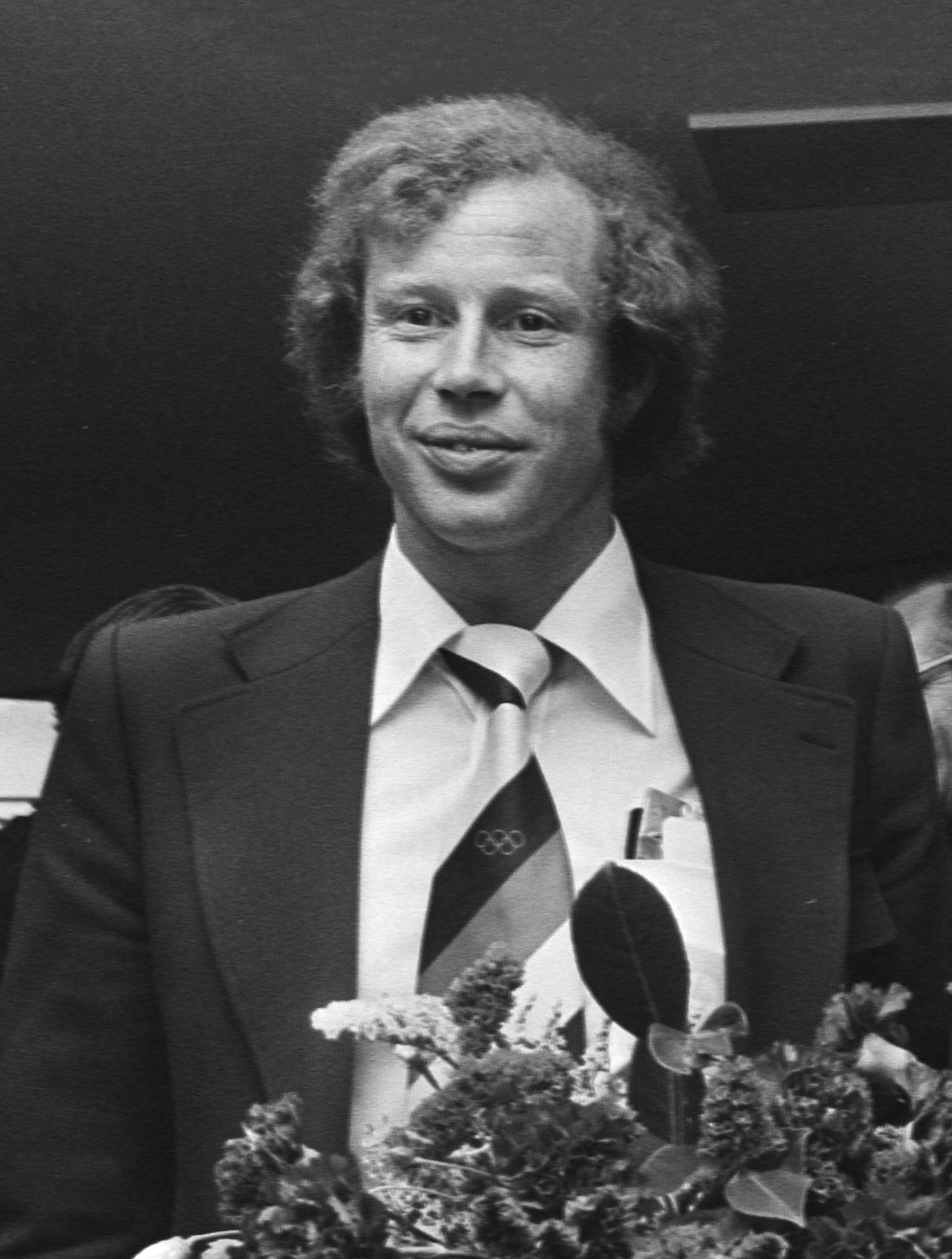
Evert Kroon was the flag bearer for the Netherlands at the closing ceremony of the 1976 Olympics.

Some sportspeople were chosen to carry the national flag of their country at the opening and closing ceremonies of the Olympic Games. As of the 2020 Summer Olympics, thirty water polo people from six continents were given the honour. Among them, three flag bearers won the tournament with his/her team.

Charles Smith, representing Great Britain, was the first water polo player to be a flag bearer at the opening and closing ceremonies of the Olympics.

Six-time Olympian Manuel Estiarte of Spain was the flag bearer during the opening ceremony at the 2000 Summer Olympics in Sydney.

After winning gold in the women's tournament, Carmela Allucci, the captain of the Italian women's water polo team, carried the national flag of Italy at the closing ceremony of the 2004 Summer Olympics, becoming the first female water polo player to be given the honour.

Legend

- 2008 O – Opening ceremony of the 2008 Summer Olympics
- 2012 C – Closing ceremony of the 2012 Summer Olympics
- – Hosts
- Flag bearer – Female flag bearer
- Flag bearer^{‡} – Flag bearer who won the tournament with his/her team

Water polo people who were flag bearers at the opening and closing ceremonies of the Olympic Games
#	Year	Country	Flag bearer	Birth	Age	Height	Team	Pos	Water polo tournaments						Period (age of first/last)	Medals				Ref
#	Year	Country	Flag bearer	Birth	Age	Height	Team	Pos	1	2	3	4	5	6	Period (age of first/last)	G	S	B	T	Ref
1	1912 O	Great Britain	Charles Smith^{‡}	1879	33	1.86 m (6 ft 1 in)	Great Britain	GK	1908	1912	1920	1924			16 years (29/45)	3	0	0	3	
2	1920 O	Belgium	Victor Boin	1886	34		Belgium	FP	1908	1912					4 years (22/26)	0	1	1	2	
3	1924 O	Great Britain	Arthur Hunt	1886	37		Great Britain	FP	1924						0 years (37/37)	0	0	0	0	
4	1928 O	France	Jean Thorailler	1888	40		France	GK	1912	1920					8 years (24/32)	0	0	0	0	
5	1948 O	Australia	Les McKay	1917	31		Australia	FP	1948						0 years (31/31)	0	0	0	0	
6	1948 O	Yugoslavia	Božo Grkinić	1913	34		Yugoslavia	FP	1948						0 years (34/34)	0	0	0	0	
7	1952 O	Egypt	Ahmed Fouad Nessim	1924	27		Egypt	GK	1948	1952					4 years (23/27)	0	0	0	0	
8	1956 O	Singapore	Lionel Chee	1931	25		Singapore	FP	1956						0 years (25/25)	0	0	0	0	
9	1956 O	Yugoslavia	Zdravko-Ćiro Kovačić	1925	31		Yugoslavia	GK	1948	1952	1956				8 years (23/31)	0	2	0	2	
10	1968 O	Brazil	João Gonçalves	1934	33	1.75 m (5 ft 9 in)	Brazil	FP	1960	1964	1968				8 years (25/33)	0	0	0	0	
11	1968 O	Netherlands	Fred van Dorp	1938	30	1.90 m (6 ft 3 in)	Netherlands	FP	1960	1964	1968				8 years (21/30)	0	0	0	0	
11	1968 C	Netherlands	Fred van Dorp	1938	30	1.90 m (6 ft 3 in)	Netherlands	FP	1960	1964	1968				8 years (21/30)	0	0	0	0	
12	1972 O	Yugoslavia	Mirko Sandić	1942	30	1.98 m (6 ft 6 in)	Yugoslavia	FP	1960	1964	1968	1972			12 years (18/30)	1	1	0	2	
13	1976 C	Netherlands	Evert Kroon	1946	29	1.92 m (6 ft 4 in)	Netherlands	GK	1968	1972	1976				8 years (22/29)	0	0	1	1	
14	1980 O	Hungary	István Szívós Sr.	1920	59	1.85 m (6 ft 1 in)	Hungary	FP	1948	1952	1956				8 years (27/36)	2	1	0	3	
15	1984 O	Netherlands	Ton Buunk	1952	31	1.96 m (6 ft 5 in)	Netherlands	FP	1972	1976	1980	1984			12 years (19/31)	0	0	1	1	
16	1988 C	United States	Terry Schroeder	1958	29	1.90 m (6 ft 3 in)	United States	FP	1984	1988	1992				8 years (25/33)	0	2	0	2	
17	1996 O	Croatia	Perica Bukić	1966	30	1.98 m (6 ft 6 in)	Yugoslavia	FP	1984	1988					12 years (18/30)	2	1	0	3	
17	1996 O	Croatia	Perica Bukić	1966	30	1.98 m (6 ft 6 in)	Croatia	FP				1996			12 years (18/30)	2	1	0	3	
18	1996 O	FR Yugoslavia	Igor Milanović	1965	30	1.95 m (6 ft 5 in)	Yugoslavia	FP	1984	1988					12 years (18/30)	2	0	0	2	
18	1996 O	FR Yugoslavia	Igor Milanović	1965	30	1.95 m (6 ft 5 in)	FR Yugoslavia	FP				1996			12 years (18/30)	2	0	0	2	
19	2000 O	Spain	Manuel Estiarte	1961	38	1.78 m (5 ft 10 in)	Spain	FP	1980	1984	1988	1992	1996	2000	20 years (18/38)	1	1	0	2	
20	2004 O	Croatia	Dubravko Šimenc	1966	37	2.01 m (6 ft 7 in)	Yugoslavia	FP	1988						16 years (21/37)	1	1	0	2	
20	2004 O	Croatia	Dubravko Šimenc	1966	37	2.01 m (6 ft 7 in)	Croatia	FP			1996	2000	2004		16 years (21/37)	1	1	0	2	
21	2004 C	Italy	Carmela Allucci^{‡}	1970	34	1.67 m (5 ft 6 in)	Italy	FP	2004						0 years (34/34)	1	0	0	1	
22	2008 O	Montenegro	Veljko Uskoković	1971	37	1.85 m (6 ft 1 in)	FR Yugoslavia	FP	1996	2000					12 years (25/37)	0	0	1	1	
22	2008 O	Montenegro	Veljko Uskoković	1971	37	1.85 m (6 ft 1 in)	Montenegro	FP				2008			12 years (25/37)	0	0	1	1	
22	2008 C	Montenegro	Veljko Uskoković	1971	37	1.85 m (6 ft 1 in)	FR Yugoslavia	FP	1996	2000					12 years (25/37)	0	0	1	1	
22	2008 C	Montenegro	Veljko Uskoković	1971	37	1.85 m (6 ft 1 in)	Montenegro	FP				2008			12 years (25/37)	0	0	1	1	
23	2012 O	Hungary	Péter Biros	1976	36	1.96 m (6 ft 5 in)	Hungary	FP	2000	2004	2008	2012			12 years (24/36)	3	0	0	3	
24	2016 O	Croatia	Josip Pavić	1982	34	1.95 m (6 ft 5 in)	Croatia	GK	2008	2012	2016				8 years (26/34)	1	1	0	2	
25	2016 C	Montenegro	Predrag Jokić	1983	33	1.88 m (6 ft 2 in)	Serbia and Montenegro	FP	2004						12 years (21/33)	0	1	0	1	
25	2016 C	Montenegro	Predrag Jokić	1983	33	1.88 m (6 ft 2 in)	Montenegro	FP		2008	2012	2016			12 years (21/33)	0	1	0	1	
26	2020 O	Serbia	Filip Filipović^{‡}	1987	34	1.96 m (6 ft 5 in)	Serbia	FP	2008	2012	2016	2020			13 years (21/34)	2	0	2	4	
27	2020 O	Montenegro	Draško Brguljan	1984	36	1.94 m (6 ft 4 in)	Montenegro	FP	2008	2012	2016	2020			13 years (23/36)	0	0	0	0	
28	2020 C	Greece	Ioannis Fountoulis	1988	33	1.85 m (6 ft 1 in)	Greece	FP	2012	2016	2020				9 years (24/33)	0	1	0	1	
29	2020 C	Croatia	Andro Bušlje	1986	35	1.99 m (6 ft 6 in)	Croatia	FP	2008	2012	2016	2020			13 years (22/35)	1	1	0	2	
30	2020 C	Montenegro	Dušan Matković	1999	22	1.90 m (6 ft 3 in)	Montenegro	FP	2020						0 years (22/22)	0	0	0	0	

=== Oath takers ===
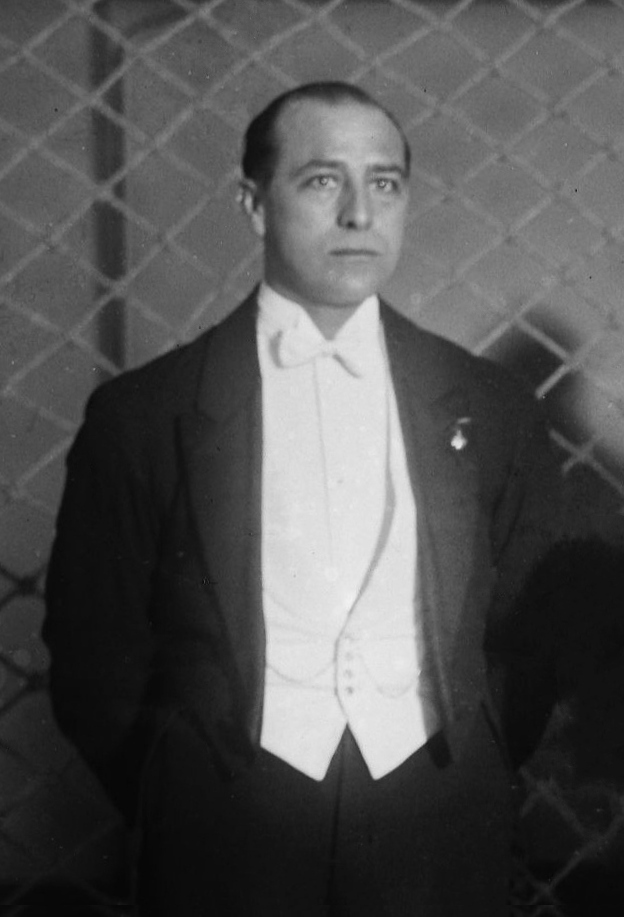
Victor Boin was the Oath taker at the opening ceremony of the 1920 Olympics.

Some sportspeople from the host nations were chosen to take the Olympic Oath at the opening ceremonies of the Olympic Games. As of the 2020 Summer Olympics, four water polo people were given the honour.

As an athlete, Victor Boin of Belgium took the first ever Olympic Oath at the 1920 Games in Antwerp.

Eugeni Asensio, a Spanish water polo referee, took the Officials' Oath at the 1992 Summer Olympics in Barcelona.

As a water polo referee, Australian Peter Kerr took the Officials' Oath at the 2000 Sydney Olympics.

Asumi Tsuzaki of Japan took the Officials' Oath at the 2020 Summer Olympics in Tokyo, becoming the first female water polo referee to be given the honour.

Legend

- – Hosts
- Oath taker – Female oath taker
- Oath taker^{‡} – Oath taker who won the tournament with his/her team

Water polo people who were oath takers at the opening ceremonies of the Olympic Games
#	Year	Oath	Country	Oath taker	Birth	Age	Water polo tournament			Ref
1	1920	Athletes' Oath	Belgium	Victor Boin	1886	34	1908	1912	As player	
2	1992	Officials' Oath	Spain	Eugeni Asensio			1992		As referee (official)	
3	2000	Officials' Oath	Australia	Peter Kerr			1996	2000	As referee (official)	
4	2020	Officials' Oath	Japan	Asumi Tsuzaki	1989	32	2020		As referee (official)	

== See also ==
- Lists of Olympic water polo records and statistics
  - List of men's Olympic water polo tournament records and statistics
  - List of women's Olympic water polo tournament records and statistics
  - List of Olympic champions in men's water polo
  - List of Olympic champions in women's water polo
  - National team appearances in the men's Olympic water polo tournament
  - National team appearances in the women's Olympic water polo tournament
  - List of players who have appeared in multiple men's Olympic water polo tournaments
  - List of players who have appeared in multiple women's Olympic water polo tournaments
  - List of Olympic medalists in water polo (men)
  - List of Olympic medalists in water polo (women)
  - List of men's Olympic water polo tournament top goalscorers
  - List of women's Olympic water polo tournament top goalscorers
  - List of men's Olympic water polo tournament goalkeepers
  - List of women's Olympic water polo tournament goalkeepers
  - List of Olympic venues in water polo
- Water polo at the World Aquatics Championships
- FINA Water Polo World Rankings
- List of water polo world medalists
- Major achievements in water polo by nation

== Sources ==
=== Official Reports (IOC) ===
PDF documents in the LA84 Foundation Digital Library:

- Official Report of the 1896 Olympic Games (download, archive)
- Official Report of the 1900 Olympic Games (download, archive)
- Official Report of the 1904 Olympic Games (download, archive)
- Official Report of the 1908 Olympic Games (download, archive) (pp. 359–361)
- Official Report of the 1912 Olympic Games (download, archive) (pp. 1021–1024, 1031–1037)
- Official Report of the 1920 Olympic Games (download, archive) (p. 130)
- Official Report of the 1924 Olympic Games (download, archive) (pp. 439–440, 486–494)
- Official Report of the 1928 Olympic Games (download, archive) (pp. 746–757, 797–807)
- Official Report of the 1932 Olympic Games (download, archive) (pp. 619–623, 646–652)
- Official Report of the 1936 Olympic Games, v.2 (download, archive) (pp. 345–356)
- Official Report of the 1948 Olympic Games (download, archive) (pp. 537–540, 640–647)
- Official Report of the 1952 Olympic Games (download, archive) (pp. 600–608)
- Official Report of the 1956 Olympic Games (download, archive) (pp. 592–594, 624–627)
- Official Report of the 1960 Olympic Games (download, archive) (pp. 552–555, 617–634)
- Official Report of the 1964 Olympic Games, v.2 (download, archive) (pp. 682–698)
- Official Report of the 1968 Olympic Games, v.3 (download, archive) (pp. 449–466, 811–826)
- Official Report of the 1972 Olympic Games, v.3 (download, archive) (pp. 331, 353–365)
- Official Report of the 1976 Olympic Games, v.3 (download, archive) (pp. 446–447, 484–497)
- Official Report of the 1980 Olympic Games, v.3 (download, archive) (pp. 458, 495–510)
- Official Report of the 1984 Olympic Games, v.2 (download, archive) (pp. 528–534)
- Official Report of the 1988 Olympic Games, v.2 (download, archive) (pp. 590–598)
- Official Report of the 1992 Olympic Games, v.5 (download, archive) (pp. 354, 386–400)
- Official Report of the 1996 Olympic Games, v.3 (download, archive) (pp. 56–73)

=== Official Results Books (IOC) ===
PDF documents in the LA84 Foundation Digital Library:

- Official Results Book – 2000 Olympic Games – Water Polo (download, archive)
- Official Results Book – 2004 Olympic Games – Water Polo (download, archive)
- Official Results Book – 2008 Olympic Games – Water Polo (download, archive)

PDF documents on the FINA website:

- Official Results Book – 2012 Olympic Games – Diving, Swimming, Synchronised Swimming, Water Polo (archive) (pp. 284–507)

PDF documents in the Olympic World Library:

- Official Results Book – 2016 Olympic Games – Water Polo (archive)

PDF documents on the International Olympic Committee website:

- Official Results Book – 2020 Olympic Games – Water Polo (archive)

=== Official Reports (FINA) ===
PDF documents on the FINA website:

- HistoFINA – Water polo medalists and statistics (as of September 2019) (archive) (pp. 4–13, 56)
- 1870–2020 | 150 years of Water Polo – Evolution of its rules (archive)

=== Official website (IOC) ===
Water polo on the International Olympic Committee website:

- Water polo
- Men's water polo
- Women's water polo

=== Sports Reference ===
Water polo on the Sports Reference website:

- Country Medal Leaders & Athlete Medal Leaders (1900–2016) (archived)
- Men's water polo (1900–2016) (archived)
- Women's water polo (2000–2016) (archived)
- Water polo at the 1900 Summer Games (men's tournament) (archived)
- Water polo at the 1904 Summer Games (men's tournament) (archived)
- Water polo at the 1908 Summer Games (men's tournament) (archived)
- Water polo at the 1912 Summer Games (men's tournament) (archived)
- Water polo at the 1920 Summer Games (men's tournament) (archived)
- Water polo at the 1924 Summer Games (men's tournament) (archived)
- Water polo at the 1928 Summer Games (men's tournament) (archived)
- Water polo at the 1932 Summer Games (men's tournament) (archived)
- Water polo at the 1936 Summer Games (men's tournament) (archived)
- Water polo at the 1948 Summer Games (men's tournament) (archived)
- Water polo at the 1952 Summer Games (men's tournament) (archived)
- Water polo at the 1956 Summer Games (men's tournament) (archived)
- Water polo at the 1960 Summer Games (men's tournament) (archived)
- Water polo at the 1964 Summer Games (men's tournament) (archived)
- Water polo at the 1968 Summer Games (men's tournament) (archived)
- Water polo at the 1972 Summer Games (men's tournament) (archived)
- Water polo at the 1976 Summer Games (men's tournament) (archived)
- Water polo at the 1980 Summer Games (men's tournament) (archived)
- Water polo at the 1984 Summer Games (men's tournament) (archived)
- Water polo at the 1988 Summer Games (men's tournament) (archived)
- Water polo at the 1992 Summer Games (men's tournament) (archived)
- Water polo at the 1996 Summer Games (men's tournament) (archived)
- Water polo at the 2000 Summer Games (men's tournament, women's tournament) (archived)
- Water polo at the 2004 Summer Games (men's tournament, women's tournament) (archived)
- Water polo at the 2008 Summer Games (men's tournament, women's tournament) (archived)
- Water polo at the 2012 Summer Games (men's tournament, women's tournament) (archived)
- Water polo at the 2016 Summer Games (men's tournament, women's tournament) (archived)

=== Todor66 ===
Water polo on the Todor66 website:

- Water polo at the Summer Games
- Water polo at the 1900 Summer Olympics (men's tournament)
- Water polo at the 1904 Summer Olympics (men's tournament)
- Water polo at the 1908 Summer Olympics (men's tournament)
- Water polo at the 1912 Summer Olympics (men's tournament)
- Water polo at the 1920 Summer Olympics (men's tournament)
- Water polo at the 1924 Summer Olympics (men's tournament)
- Water polo at the 1928 Summer Olympics (men's tournament)
- Water polo at the 1932 Summer Olympics (men's tournament)
- Water polo at the 1936 Summer Olympics (men's tournament)
- Water polo at the 1948 Summer Olympics (men's tournament)
- Water polo at the 1952 Summer Olympics (men's tournament)
- Water polo at the 1956 Summer Olympics (men's tournament)
- Water polo at the 1960 Summer Olympics (men's tournament)
- Water polo at the 1964 Summer Olympics (men's tournament)
- Water polo at the 1968 Summer Olympics (men's tournament, men's qualification)
- Water polo at the 1972 Summer Olympics (men's tournament, men's qualification)
- Water polo at the 1976 Summer Olympics (men's tournament, men's European qualification)
- Water polo at the 1980 Summer Olympics (men's tournament, men's European qualification, men's world qualification)
- Water polo at the 1984 Summer Olympics (men's tournament, men's qualification)
- Water polo at the 1988 Summer Olympics (men's tournament, men's qualification)
- Water polo at the 1992 Summer Olympics (men's tournament, men's qualification)
- Water polo at the 1996 Summer Olympics (men's tournament, men's qualification)
- Water polo at the 2000 Summer Olympics (men's tournament, men's qualification, women's tournament, women's qualification)
- Water polo at the 2004 Summer Olympics (men's tournament, men's qualification, women's tournament, women's qualification)
- Water polo at the 2008 Summer Olympics (men's tournament, men's qualification, women's tournament, women's qualification)
- Water polo at the 2012 Summer Olympics (men's tournament, men's qualification, women's tournament, women's qualification)
- Water polo at the 2016 Summer Olympics (men's tournament, men's qualification, women's tournament, women's qualification)
- Water polo at the 2020 Summer Olympics (men's tournament, men's qualification, women's tournament, women's qualification)
