= Aucamp =

Aucamp is a surname. Notable people with the surname include:

- Carol Hanks Aucamp (born 1943), American tennis player
- Hennie Aucamp (1934–2014), South African poet, writer and academic
- William Aucamp (1932–1992), South African water polo player

== See also ==
- Aucamp v Morton, a South African contract law case
