= Killian =

- Language: Irish

Origin
- Meaning: Possibly 'Little Church'; alternatively a dinimutive form of a name meaning 'Strife', 'War', or 'Bright-headed'
- Region of origin: Ireland

Other names
- Variant forms: Ó Cillín, Cillian, Kilian, Kiliaen, Kilian, Killion, Kileen, Kylian, Cilléne, Cillín; possibly Ceallach

Killian or Kilian, as a given name, is an Anglicized version of the Irish name Cillian. The name Cillian was borne by several early Irish saints including missionaries to Artois (France) and Franconia (Germany) and the author of the life of St Brigid.

The name is said to derive from Saint Kilian, an Irish missionary to Germany in the 7th century, who, according to the Acta Sanctorum, was born in Mullagh, County Cavan, Ireland c. 640. He departed for his mission to the continent with 12 apostles from Kilmacologue in the parish of Tuosist, County Kerry, Ireland. In 689, he was martyred in Würzburg, now in Bavaria, and subsequently became the city's patron saint.

The most likely meaning of the name is 'little church', a reference to someone prayerful or spiritual, cill meaning 'church' in the Irish language, while the suffix -ín is used affectionately to indicate a "pet" or diminutive status. Patrick Woulfe wrote that Cillian is a diminutive of Ceallach which means 'war', 'strife', or 'bright-headed'.

== Notable people named Cillian ==
- Cillian Buckley (born 1992), an Irish hurler
- Cillian Farrell (born 1977), an Irish hurling manager
- Cillian McDaid (born 1997), an Irish Gaelic and Australian rules footballer
- Cillian Morrison (born 1991), an Irish Gaelic footballer
- Cillian Murphy (born 1976), an Irish actor
- Cillian O'Connor (born 1992), a Gaelic footballer for Mayo
- Cillian Ryan, an economist and Pro Vice-Chancellor International, Nottingham Trent University
- Cillian Sheridan (born 1987), an Irish professional footballer who plays for Kilmarnock
- Cillian Twomey, a retired consultant physician in geriatric medicine at Cork University and St. Finbarr’s Hospital, Cork, Ireland
- Cillian Vallely, an Irish musician
- Cillian Willis (born 1985), a professional rugby union footballer employed by Leinster Rugby

== Notable people named Killian ==
- Killian Brady (born 1990), an Irish Gaelic footballer
- Killian Brennan, an Irish footballer with the League of Ireland club St Patrick's Athletic
- Killian Clarke (born 1993), an Irish Gaelic footballer
- Killian Dain, ring name of Northern Irish professional wrestler Damian Mackle
- Killian Donnelly, an Irish-born musical theatre performer
- Aldrich Killian, supervillain and main antagonist of Iron Man 3
- Dan A. Killian, American college sports coach
- Edwin Henry Killian (1876–1928), a Major League Baseball pitcher primarily of the Detroit Tigers
- Eugene H. Killian (1873–1943), an American politician
- George E. Killian, a sports administrator and the president of the International University Sports Federation
- Gustav Killian (1860–1921), a German laryngologist for whom Killian's dehiscence is named
- James Rhyne Killian (1904–1988), the 10th president of the Massachusetts Institute of Technology
- Jerry B. Killian, an officer in the Texas Air National Guard in the early 1970s, to whom Lieutenant George W. Bush was a subordinate
- Richard Killian, an American businessman and politician
- Robert K. Killian (1919–2005), an American politician from the state of Connecticut
- Killian Scott, an Irish actor
- Killian K. Van Rensselaer (1763–1845), member of the United States House of Representatives from New York
- Killian Peier, Swiss ski jumper, 2019 World Championships medalist
- Killian Tillie (born 1998), French basketball player
- Killian Hayes (born 2001), American–French basketball player
- Killian Jones, a character from the show Once Upon a Time, also known as Captain Hook

== Notable people named Kilian ==
- Saint Kilian (640–689), Irish missionary bishop and the apostle of Franconia
- Kilian Albrecht (born 1973), Austrian-Bulgarian alpine skier
- Kilian Elkinson (born 1990), Bermudian footballer
- Kílian Jornet (born 1987), a Spanish ski mountaineer, long-distance runner, mountain biker and duathlete
- Kilian Zierer (born 2000), German-born American football player
- André Kilian (born 1987), German-born footballer playing for North Queensland Fury
- Caleb Kilian (born 1997), American baseball player
- Crawford Kilian (born 1941), Canadian novelist and a college professor
- Günter Kilian (1950–2026), German water polo player
- Hanns Kilian (1905–1981), German bobsledder who competed from the late 1920s to the late 1930
- Horst Kilian (born 1950), German water polo player, twin brother of Günter
- Inge Kilian (born 1935), German high jumper
- John Kilian (1811–1884), Lutheran pastor and leader of the colony known as the Wends of Texas
- Michael Kilian (1939–2005), author and journalist primarily for the Chicago Tribune in Washington, D.C
- Victor Kilian (1891–1979), American actor blacklisted by the Hollywood movie studio in the 1950s
- Wiesław Kilian (1952–2019), Polish politician

== Notable people named Kylian ==
- Kylian Hazard (born 1995), Belgian footballer
- Kylian Mash (born 1983), French DJ and record producer
- Kylian Mbappé (born 1998), French footballer

== Notable people named Killion ==
- John Joseph Killion (1859–1937), known as Jake Kilrain, famous bare knuckle fighter and glove boxer of the 1880s
- Kyle Killion (born 1984), American football linebacker
- Redley A. Killion (born 1951), Micronesian politician
- Sean Killion (born 1967), American swimmer
- Tom Killion (born 1957), American politician from Pennsylvania
