= Lissavruggy =

Townland in County Galway, Ireland

Lissavruggy (Irish form of a name: Lios a Bhrugaidh) is a townland in the parish of Killian and Killeroan. It is located in northeastern Galway, in the west of Ireland. There is some dispute over the origin of its name. According to O'Donovan's Field Name Books, Lisavruggy gets its name from the Ringfort, a bhrogaidh, meaning that it is the fort of the brooee, or farmer. Older generations pronounce it Liosaruaig. This has been anglicized to Lissavruggy meaning "the routed fort", which leads historian Larry Kilcommins to believe that the ruggy part comes from the Irish word ruaig, which means frightened or routed (after a battle).

Two lios (ringforts) are located in the eastern part of the village, the largest being 330 links in diameter. According to the OSI maps, a number of forts are arranged in a straight line from eastern Lissavruggy to Blainaloosh. These forts are bounded by the townlands of Cappough, Buggauns, Saint Brandans, Blainaloosh, Ballynacor French, and Cloonkeen Davies.

The village is unique, being the first property in Ireland to be purchased under the Purchase of Land (Ireland) Act 1885, generally known as the Ashbourne Act. Reading about the act in a local newspaper in 1885, Thomas Lohan thought it may be relevant to the case of Lissavrugy. French, the current owner of the land, was selling part of his property, so Thomas and Marcus Lohan purchased the land of Lissavruggy at auction for the tenants. This was the first time that such an event had happened in Ireland.

== Census ==
- According to the 1749 Elphin Census, there were 22 houses and a total population of 94 residents.
- According to Griffiths Valuation of 1855, there were 48 houses.
- According to 1901 National Census there were 37 houses and a total population of 196 residents.
- According to 1911 National Census there were 34 houses and a total population of 194 residents.

The Elphin Census was a sectarian headcount carried out by the Anglican Bishop of Elphin, a diocese that covers most of Roscommon and parts of Galway and Sligo. It includes Killian parish, which in turn includes Lissavruggy. The census records the name of the homeowner, his occupation, number of Protestants, Papist children (under 14) and adults, and the number of Protestant and Papist male and female servants.

== Griffiths Valuation ==
Griffiths Valuation was a survey of Ireland which was completed in 1855. According to Griffiths Valuation, Lissavruggy had three Rundale villages entitled Lissavruggy Village, Moneen Village, and Garravisker Village. Lissavruggy is the village itself, while Moneen (Móinín which means "a small bog") was located to the west, and Garravisker (Gairbh eiscir which means a "rough ridge or long chain of sand hills") was to the east.

This division of the land in Rundale was similar to medieval European practices that lasted in [Ireland] until the 19th century. Small strips of land were cooperatively managed by extended groups of about 20 households, and were periodically re-distributed. As a result, a community-orientated society was created.

== St. Brendan's Well ==
In the nearby townland of St. Brendan’s (otherwise known as Cregganagrogy or Doranstown) sits a holy well dedicated to St. Brendan. It is the centre for large pilgrimages that take place annually on 16 May. Local tradition says that one day St. Brendan, who was blind, was walking his dog and the dog ran away. St. Brendan reached into a bush while searching for the dog. As he straightened up, he pulled something out of the ground, causing water to burst up and struck him in the face, restoring his sight. The spring has since been declared a holy well.

Pattern Day - Tradition has these patterns being encouraged by the clergy of the penal days, with festivities beginning with a religious event (usually Mass) near the well. In the 1650s, Catholic Churches were destroyed and almost completely wiped out by Oliver Cromwell. This period, which lasted until the late 1700s, was known as the Penal Period, a time of priest hunters, mass rocks, and latter day stations. There were no regular Catholic Churches in the parish during this period; masses were conducted in hollows, sandpits, and bogs.

== Reproductive Loan Fund ==
A new innovation called the Reproductive Loan Fund was introduced to Ballygar in 1835. Similar to the Credit Union, this was a non-profit organization that gave tenants access to funds when they were struggling. The loan office was located in the center of the town on Main Street. In 1844, £1,000 punt of the loan fund was circulated in the area, which attracted people from villages like Garravisker and Moneen.
