= List of men's Olympic water polo tournament goalkeepers =

This is a list of male goalkeepers who have been named in the national water polo team at the Summer Olympics.

== Abbreviations ==
GK	Goalkeeper	Rk	Rank	Ref	Reference	ISHOF	International Swimming Hall of Fame
(C)	Captain	p.	page	pp.	pages		

== Winning goalkeepers ==
The following table is pre-sorted by edition of the Olympics (in ascending order), cap number or name of the goalkeeper (in ascending order), respectively. Last updated: 1 April 2021.

Legend and abbreviation

- Team – Olympic winning streak (winning three or more Olympic titles in a row)
- Team – Winning all matches during the tournament
- Team – Host team
- Team^{†} – Defunct team
- Eff % – Save efficiency (Saves / Shots)

Winning goalkeepers by tournament
Year	Winning team	Cap	Goalkeeper	Birth	Age	Height	Saves	Shots	Eff %	Note	Ref
1900	Great Britain (1st title)		William Henry	1859	41		—N/a	—N/a	—N/a	The only GK	
1904	Water polo was an unofficial sport										
1908	Great Britain (2nd title)		Charles Smith	1879	29	1.86 m (6 ft 1 in)	—N/a	—N/a	—N/a	The only GK	
1912	Great Britain (3rd title)		Charles Smith (2)	1879	33	1.86 m (6 ft 1 in)	—N/a	—N/a	—N/a	The only GK	
1920	Great Britain (4th title)		Charles Smith (3)	1879	41	1.86 m (6 ft 1 in)	—N/a	—N/a	—N/a	The only GK	
1924	France (1st title)		Paul Dujardin	1894	30		—N/a	—N/a	—N/a	The only GK	
1928	Germany (1st title)		Johann Blank	1904	24		—N/a	—N/a	—N/a		
1928	Germany (1st title)		Erich Rademacher	1901	27		—N/a	—N/a	—N/a		
1932	Hungary (1st title)		István Barta	1895	37		—N/a	—N/a	—N/a		
1932	Hungary (1st title)		György Bródy	1908	24	1.85 m (6 ft 1 in)	—N/a	—N/a	—N/a		
1936	Hungary (2nd title)		György Bródy (2)	1908	28	1.85 m (6 ft 1 in)	—N/a	—N/a	—N/a	Starting GK	
1936	Hungary (2nd title)		György Kutasi	1910	25		—N/a	—N/a	—N/a		
1948	Italy (1st title)		Pasquale Buonocore	1916	32		—N/a	—N/a	—N/a	Starting GK	
1948	Italy (1st title)		(Unknown)				—N/a	—N/a	—N/a		
1952	Hungary (3rd title)		Róbert Antal	1921	31		—N/a	—N/a	—N/a		
1952	Hungary (3rd title)		László Jeney	1923	29	1.81 m (5 ft 11 in)	—N/a	—N/a	—N/a	Starting GK	
1956	Hungary (4th title)		Ottó Boros	1929	27	1.86 m (6 ft 1 in)	—N/a	—N/a	—N/a	Starting GK	
1956	Hungary (4th title)		László Jeney (2)	1923	33	1.81 m (5 ft 11 in)	—N/a	—N/a	—N/a		
1960	Italy (2nd title)		Dante Rossi	1936	24	1.91 m (6 ft 3 in)	—N/a	—N/a	—N/a	Starting GK	
1960	Italy (2nd title)		Brunello Spinelli	1939	21	1.82 m (6 ft 0 in)	—N/a	—N/a	—N/a		
1964	Hungary (5th title)		Miklós Ambrus	1933	31	1.85 m (6 ft 1 in)	—N/a	—N/a	—N/a		
1964	Hungary (5th title)		Ottó Boros (2)	1929	35	1.86 m (6 ft 1 in)	—N/a	—N/a	—N/a	Starting GK	
1968	Yugoslavia^{†} (1st title)	1	Karlo Stipanić	1941	26	1.83 m (6 ft 0 in)	—N/a	—N/a	—N/a		
1968	Yugoslavia^{†} (1st title)	11	Zdravko Hebel	1943	25	1.87 m (6 ft 2 in)	—N/a	—N/a	—N/a		
1972	Soviet Union^{†} (1st title)	1	Vadim Gulyayev	1941	31	1.83 m (6 ft 0 in)	—N/a	—N/a	—N/a		
1972	Soviet Union^{†} (1st title)	11	Viacheslav Sobchenko	1949	23	1.87 m (6 ft 2 in)	—N/a	—N/a	—N/a		
1976	Hungary (6th title)	1	Endre Molnár	1945	31	1.85 m (6 ft 1 in)	—N/a	—N/a	—N/a		
1976	Hungary (6th title)	11	Tibor Cservenyák	1948	27	1.85 m (6 ft 1 in)	—N/a	—N/a	—N/a		
1980	Soviet Union^{†} (2nd title)	1	Yevgeny Sharonov	1958	21	1.89 m (6 ft 2 in)	—N/a	—N/a	—N/a		
1980	Soviet Union^{†} (2nd title)	11	Viacheslav Sobchenko (2)	1949	31	1.87 m (6 ft 2 in)	—N/a	—N/a	—N/a		
1984	Yugoslavia^{†} (2nd title)	1	Milorad Krivokapić	1956	28	1.87 m (6 ft 2 in)	—N/a	—N/a	—N/a	Starting GK	
1984	Yugoslavia^{†} (2nd title)	13	Andrija Popović	1959	24	1.93 m (6 ft 4 in)	—N/a	—N/a	—N/a		
1988	Yugoslavia^{†} (3rd title)	1	Aleksandar Šoštar	1964	24	1.96 m (6 ft 5 in)	—N/a	—N/a	—N/a	Starting GK	
1988	Yugoslavia^{†} (3rd title)	13	Renco Posinković	1964	24	1.97 m (6 ft 6 in)	—N/a	—N/a	—N/a		
1992	Italy (3rd title)	1	Francesco Attolico	1963	29	1.93 m (6 ft 4 in)	—N/a	—N/a	—N/a	Starting GK	
1992	Italy (3rd title)	13	Gianni Averaimo	1964	27	1.83 m (6 ft 0 in)	—N/a	—N/a	—N/a		
1996	Spain (1st title)	1	Jesús Rollán	1968	28	1.87 m (6 ft 2 in)	62	110	56.4%	Starting GK	
1996	Spain (1st title)	4	Ángel Andreo	1972	23	1.91 m (6 ft 3 in)	0	0	—		
2000	Hungary (7th title)	1	Zoltán Kósz	1967	32	1.92 m (6 ft 4 in)	58	112	51.8%	Starting GK	
2000	Hungary (7th title)	10	Zoltán Szécsi	1977	22	1.98 m (6 ft 6 in)	6	9	66.7%		
2004	Hungary (8th title)	1	Zoltán Szécsi (2)	1977	26	1.98 m (6 ft 6 in)	40	75	53.3%	Starting GK	
2004	Hungary (8th title)	10	István Gergely	1976	28	2.01 m (6 ft 7 in)	8	12	66.7%		
2008	Hungary (9th title)	1	Zoltán Szécsi (3)	1977	30	1.98 m (6 ft 6 in)	42	83	50.6%	Starting GK	
2008	Hungary (9th title)	13	István Gergely (2)	1976	32	2.01 m (6 ft 7 in)	24	38	63.2%		
2012	Croatia (1st title)	1	Josip Pavić	1982	30	1.95 m (6 ft 5 in)	85	121	70.2%	Starting GK	
2012	Croatia (1st title)	13	Frano Vićan	1976	36	1.92 m (6 ft 4 in)	10	16	62.5%		
2016	Serbia (1st title)	1	Gojko Pijetlović	1983	33	1.94 m (6 ft 4 in)	14	21	66.7%		
2016	Serbia (1st title)	13	Branislav Mitrović	1985	31	2.01 m (6 ft 7 in)	60	119	50.4%	Starting GK	
Year	Winning team	Cap	Goalkeeper	Birth	Age	Height	Saves	Shots	Eff %	Note	Ref

Sources:

- Official Reports (PDF): 1908 (pp. 360–361), 1912 (pp. 1022, 1024, 1033), 1920 (p. 130), 1924 (pp. 488, 490, 492), 1928 (pp. 803–804, 806), 1932 (pp. 646, 649–650), 1936 (pp. 347, 349, 355), 1948 (pp. 643, 645–646), 1952 (pp. 602–603, 606–608), 1956 (pp. 625–626), 1960 (pp. 618–619, 627–628, 631), 1964 (pp. 685, 687, 691, 694–695, 698), 1968 (pp. 812, 814, 816–817, 819, 822, 824, 826), 1972 (pp. 358–359, 363–365), 1976 (pp. 487, 489, 491–492), 1980 (pp. 497, 500–502), 1984 (pp. 528–533), 1988 (pp. 593–595, 597), 1992 (pp. 391–395, 399–400), 1996 (pp. 57–61, 70–71, 73);
- Official Results Books (PDF): 2000 (pp. 45, 50, 55, 78, 81, 84, 87, 90), 2004 (pp. 207–208), 2008 (pp. 202–203), 2012 (pp. 471–472), 2016 (pp. 131–132).

== Records and statistics ==
=== Multiple appearances ===
==== By tournament ====
The following table is pre-sorted by edition of the Olympics (in ascending order), name of the team (in ascending order), name of the goalkeeper (in ascending order), respectively. Last updated: 1 April 2021.

As of the 2020 Summer Olympics, 52 male goalkeepers have been named in the national water polo team in three or more Olympic tournaments.

Legend

- Team^{*} – Host team

Year	Total	Five-time Olympian (GK)		Four-time Olympian (GK)		Three-time Olympian (GK)	
1900	0	—	0	—	0	—	0
1908	0	—	0	—	0	—	0
1912	0	—	0	—	0	—	0
1920	2	—	0	—	0	Great Britain: Charles Smith; Sweden: Torsten Kumfeldt	2
1924	2	—	0	Great Britain: Charles Smith	1	Belgium: Albert Durant	1
1928	0	—	0	—	0	—	0
1932	1	—	0	—	0	Hungary: István Barta	1
1936	0	—	0	—	0	—	0
1948	0	—	0	—	0	—	0
1952	0	—	0	—	0	—	0
1956	3	—	0	—	0	Hungary: László Jeney; Yugoslavia: Juraj Amšel, Zdravko-Ćiro Kovačić	3
1960	3	—	0	Hungary: László Jeney	1	United Team of Germany: Emil Bildstein; Soviet Union: Boris Goykhman	2
1964	1	—	0	—	0	Hungary: Ottó Boros	1
1968	0	—	0	—	0	—	0
1972	3	—	0	—	0	Australia: Michael Withers; West Germany^{*}: Hans Hoffmeister; Yugoslavia: Karlo Stipanić	3
Year	Total	Five-time Olympian (GK)		Four-time Olympian (GK)		Three-time Olympian (GK)	
1976	4	—	0	—	0	Cuba: Oscar Periche; Hungary: Endre Molnár; Italy: Alberto Alberani; Netherlands: Evert Kroon	4
1980	3	—	0	Cuba: Oscar Periche; Hungary: Endre Molnár (International Olympic Committee) Italy: Alberto Alberani	3	—	0
1984	1	—	0	—	0	Italy: Umberto Panerai	1
1988	1	—	0	—	0	West Germany: Peter Röhle	1
1992	4	—	0	Germany: Peter Röhle	1	Australia: Glenn Townsend (International Olympic Committee) Unified Team: (Note: In 1992, 12 of the 15 former Soviet Republics competed together as the Unified Team and marched under the Olympic Flag in the Barcelona Games.) Yevgeny Sharonov; United States: Craig Wilson	3
1996	5	—	0	—	0	Germany: Ingo Borgmann; Greece: Evangelos Patras; Hungary: Péter Kuna; Spain: Jesús Rollán; United States^{*}: Christopher Duplanty	5
2000	5	—	0	Spain: Jesús Rollán	1	Hungary: Zoltán Kósz; Italy: Francesco Attolico; Netherlands: Arie van de Bunt; Yugoslavia: (Note: After the breakup of Yugoslavia, FR Yugoslavia men's national water polo team participated at the 1996 and 2000 Olympics, and won a bronze medal in 2000. In 2003, after the country was renamed from FR Yugoslavia to Serbia and Montenegro, the team was also renamed to "Serbia and Montenegro men's national water polo team".) Aleksandar Šoštar	4
2004	3	Spain: Jesús Rollán	1	—	0	Russia: Nikolay Maksimov; Spain: Ángel Andreo	2
Year	Total	Five-time Olympian (GK)		Four-time Olympian (GK)		Three-time Olympian (GK)	
2008	9	—	0	Spain: Ángel Andreo	1	Australia: Rafael Sterk; Croatia: Frano Vićan; Germany: Alexander Tchigir; Greece: Nikolaos Deligiannis, Georgios Reppas; Hungary: István Gergely, Zoltán Szécsi; Italy: Stefano Tempesti	8
2012	7	—	0	Croatia: Frano Vićan; Greece: Nikolaos Deligiannis; Hungary: Zoltán Szécsi; Italy: Stefano Tempesti; Kazakhstan: Nikolay Maksimov	5	Kazakhstan: Alexandr Shvedov; Montenegro: Denis Šefik	2
2016	7	Italy: Stefano Tempesti	1	—	0	Australia: James Stanton; Brazil^{*}: Slobodan Soro; Croatia: Josip Pavić; Montenegro: Miloš Šćepanović; Spain: Iñaki Aguilar; United States: Merrill Moses	6
2020	4	—	0	—	0	Australia: Joel Dennerley; Hungary: Viktor Nagy; Serbia: Gojko Pijetlović; Spain: Daniel López	4
Year	Total	Five-time Olympian (GK)		Four-time Olympian (GK)		Three-time Olympian (GK)	

==== Four-time Olympians ====
The following table is pre-sorted by number of Olympic appearances (in descending order), year of the last Olympic appearance (in ascending order), year of the first Olympic appearance (in ascending order), date of birth (in ascending order), name of the goalkeeper (in ascending order), respectively. Last updated: 1 April 2021.

Thirteen male goalkeepers have been named in the national water polo tea in four or more Olympic tournaments between 1900 and 2016 inclusive.

Legend and abbreviation

- – Hosts
- Apps – Appearances

Male goalkeepers who have been named in the national team in four or more Olympic tournaments
Apps	Goalkeeper	Birth	Height	Men's team	Water polo tournaments					Period (age of first/last)	Medals				Ref
Apps	Goalkeeper	Birth	Height	Men's team	1	2	3	4	5	Period (age of first/last)	G	S	B	T	Ref
5	Jesús Rollán	1968	1.87 m (6 ft 2 in)	Spain	1988	1992	1996	2000	2004	16 years (20/36)	1	1	0	2	
5	Stefano Tempesti	1979	2.05 m (6 ft 9 in)	Italy	2000	2004	2008	2012	2016	16 years (21/37)	0	1	1	2	
4	Charles Smith	1879	1.86 m (6 ft 1 in)	Great Britain	1908	1912	1920	1924		16 years (29/45)	3	0	0	3	
4	László Jeney	1923	1.81 m (5 ft 11 in)	Hungary	1948	1952	1956	1960		12 years (25/37)	2	1	1	4	
4	Endre Molnár	1945	1.85 m (6 ft 1 in)	Hungary	1968	1972	1976	1980		12 years (23/35)	1	1	2	4	
4	Alberto Alberani	1947	1.92 m (6 ft 4 in)	Italy	1968	1972	1976	1980		12 years (21/33)	0	1	0	1	
4	Oscar Periche	1949	1.86 m (6 ft 1 in)	Cuba	1968	1972	1976	1980		12 years (18/30)	0	0	0	0	
4	Peter Röhle	1957	1.93 m (6 ft 4 in)	West Germany	1976		1984	1988		16 years (19/35)	0	0	1	1	
4	Peter Röhle	1957	1.93 m (6 ft 4 in)	Germany					1992	16 years (19/35)	0	0	1	1	
4	Ángel Andreo	1972	1.91 m (6 ft 3 in)	Spain	1996	2000	2004	2008		12 years (23/35)	1	0	0	1	
4	Nikolay Maksimov	1972	1.90 m (6 ft 3 in)	Russia	1996	2000	2004			16 years (23/39)	0	1	1	2	
4	Nikolay Maksimov	1972	1.90 m (6 ft 3 in)	Kazakhstan					2012	16 years (23/39)	0	1	1	2	
4	Frano Vićan	1976	1.92 m (6 ft 4 in)	Croatia	2000	2004	2008	2012		12 years (24/36)	1	0	0	1	
4	Nikolaos Deligiannis	1976	1.90 m (6 ft 3 in)	Greece	2000	2004	2008	2012		12 years (24/35)	0	0	0	0	
4	Zoltán Szécsi	1977	1.98 m (6 ft 6 in)	Hungary	2000	2004	2008	2012		12 years (22/34)	3	0	0	3	
Apps	Goalkeeper	Birth	Height	Men's team	1	2	3	4	5	Period (age of first/last)	G	S	B	T	Ref
Apps	Goalkeeper	Birth	Height	Men's team	Water polo tournaments					Period (age of first/last)	Medals				Ref

=== Multiple medalists ===
The following table is pre-sorted by total number of Olympic medals (in descending order), number of Olympic gold medals (in descending order), number of Olympic silver medals (in descending order), year of receiving the last Olympic medal (in ascending order), year of receiving the first Olympic medal (in ascending order), name of the goalkeeper (in ascending order), respectively. Last updated: 1 April 2021.

As of 2016, eight male goalkeepers have won three or more Olympic medals in water polo.

Legend

- – Hosts

Male goalkeepers who have won three or more Olympic medals in water polo
Rk	Goalkeeper	Birth	Height	Men's team	Water polo tournaments					Period (age of first/last)	Medals				Ref
Rk	Goalkeeper	Birth	Height	Men's team	1	2	3	4	5	Period (age of first/last)	G	S	B	T	Ref
1	László Jeney	1923	1.81 m (5 ft 11 in)	Hungary	1948	1952	1956	1960		12 years (25/37)	2	1	1	4	
2	Endre Molnár	1945	1.85 m (6 ft 1 in)	Hungary	1968	1972	1976	1980		12 years (23/35)	1	1	2	4	
3	Charles Smith	1879	1.86 m (6 ft 1 in)	Great Britain	1908	1912	1920	1924		16 years (29/45)	3	0	0	3	
3	Zoltán Szécsi	1977	1.98 m (6 ft 6 in)	Hungary	2000	2004	2008	2012		12 years (22/34)	3	0	0	3	
5	Ottó Boros	1929	1.86 m (6 ft 1 in)	Hungary	1956	1960	1964			8 years (27/35)	2	0	1	3	
6	Yevgeny Sharonov	1958	1.89 m (6 ft 2 in)	Soviet Union	1980		1988			12 years (21/33)	1	0	2	3	
6	Yevgeny Sharonov	1958	1.89 m (6 ft 2 in)	(International Olympic Committee) Unified Team				1992		12 years (21/33)	1	0	2	3	
7	Albert Durant	1892		Belgium	1912	1920	1924			12 years (20/32)	0	2	1	3	
8	Torsten Kumfeldt	1886		Sweden	1908	1912	1920			12 years (22/34)	0	1	2	3	
Rk	Goalkeeper	Birth	Height	Men's team	1	2	3	4	5	Period (age of first/last)	G	S	B	T	Ref
Rk	Goalkeeper	Birth	Height	Men's team	Water polo tournaments					Period (age of first/last)	Medals				Ref

=== Multiple gold medalists ===
The following table is pre-sorted by number of Olympic gold medals (in descending order), number of Olympic silver medals (in descending order), number of Olympic bronze medals (in descending order), year of receiving the last Olympic gold medal (in ascending order), year of receiving the first Olympic gold medal (in ascending order), name of the player (in ascending order), respectively. Last updated: 1 April 2021.

As of 2016, seven male goalkeepers have won two or more Olympic gold medals in water polo.

Legend

- – Hosts

Male goalkeepers who won two or more Olympic gold medals in water polo
Rk	Goalkeeper	Birth	Height	Men's team	Water polo tournaments					Period (age of first/last)	Medals				Ref
Rk	Goalkeeper	Birth	Height	Men's team	1	2	3	4	5	Period (age of first/last)	G	S	B	T	Ref
1	Charles Smith	1879	1.86 m (6 ft 1 in)	Great Britain	1908	1912	1920	1924		16 years (29/45)	3	0	0	3	
1	Zoltán Szécsi	1977	1.98 m (6 ft 6 in)	Hungary	2000	2004	2008	2012		12 years (22/34)	3	0	0	3	
3	László Jeney	1923	1.81 m (5 ft 11 in)	Hungary	1948	1952	1956	1960		12 years (25/37)	2	1	1	4	
4	Ottó Boros	1929	1.86 m (6 ft 1 in)	Hungary	1956	1960	1964			8 years (27/35)	2	0	1	3	
5	György Bródy	1908	1.85 m (6 ft 1 in)	Hungary	1932	1936				4 years (24/28)	2	0	0	2	
5	Viacheslav Sobchenko	1949	1.87 m (6 ft 2 in)	Soviet Union	1972		1980			8 years (23/31)	2	0	0	2	
5	István Gergely	1976	2.01 m (6 ft 7 in)	Slovakia	2000					8 years (24/32)	2	0	0	2	
5	István Gergely	1976	2.01 m (6 ft 7 in)	Hungary		2004	2008			8 years (24/32)	2	0	0	2	
Rk	Goalkeeper	Birth	Height	Men's team	1	2	3	4	5	Period (age of first/last)	G	S	B	T	Ref
Rk	Goalkeeper	Birth	Height	Men's team	Water polo tournaments					Period (age of first/last)	Medals				Ref

=== Most saves ===
==== One match ====
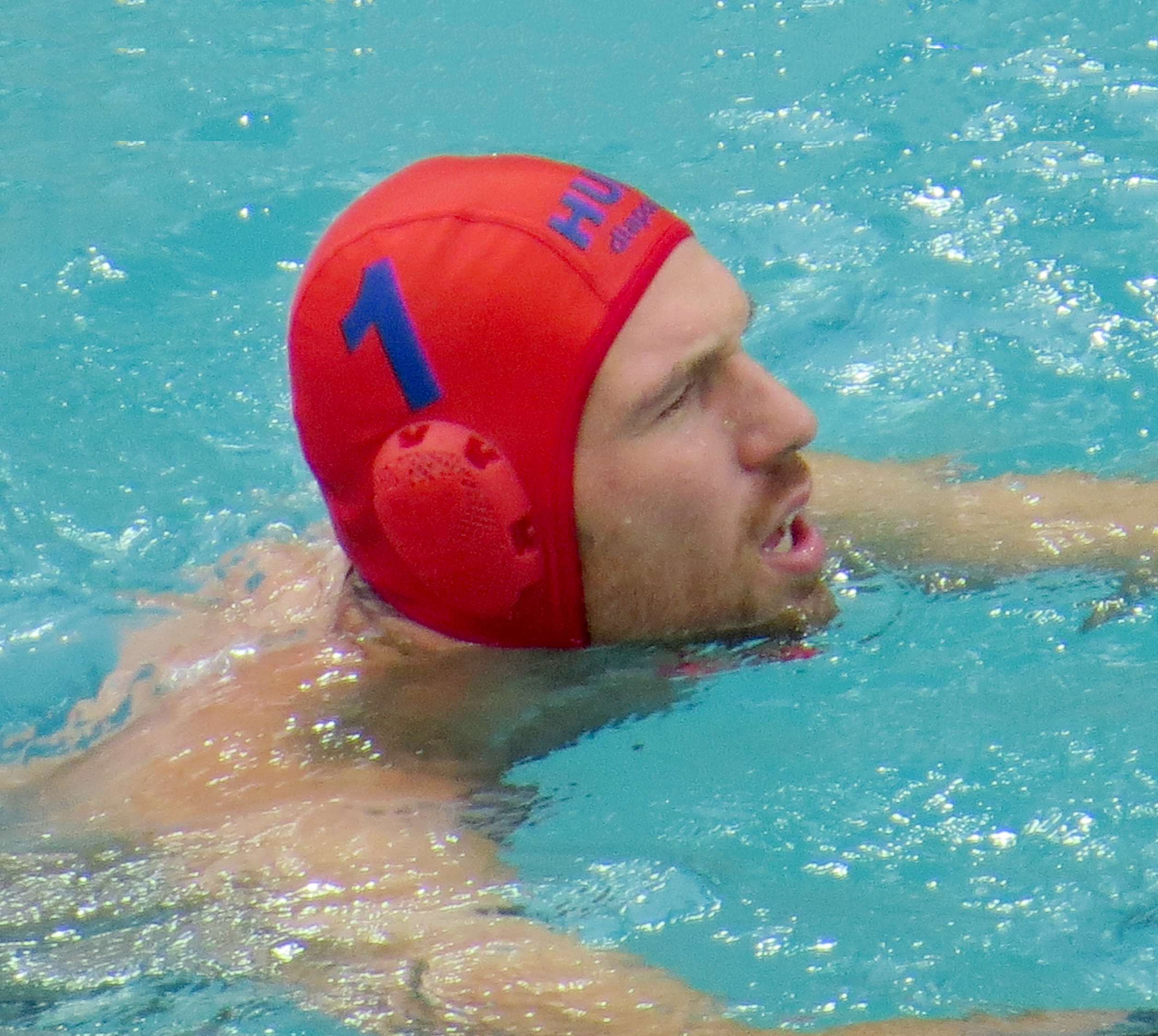
Hungarian Viktor Nagy saved 16 shots in a match in 2016.

The following table is pre-sorted by date of the match (in ascending order), name of the goalkeeper (in ascending order), respectively. Last updated: 1 April 2021.

Since 1996, nine male water polo goalkeepers have each saved sixteen or more shots in an Olympic match.

The first man to do so was Christopher Duplanty, with the United States men's national team in Atlanta. He blocked 20 shots on 24 July 1996, setting the record for the most shots saved by a water polo goalkeeper in a single Olympic match.

The most recent goalkeeper to do so was Viktor Nagy, with Hungary men's national team in Rio de Janeiro on 18 August 2016.

Italian Stefano Tempesti is the only water polo goalkeeper to achieve this feat twice.

Legend and abbreviation

- – Player's team drew the match
- – Player's team lost the match
- Team – Host team
- Player^{‡} – Player who won the tournament with his team
- aet – After extra time
- pso – Penalty shootout
- OR – Official Reports
- ORB – Official Results Books

Male goalkeepers with sixteen or more saves in an Olympic match (statistics since 1996)
#	Saves	Goalkeeper	Birth	Age	Height	For	Result	Against	Tournament	Round	Date	Ref
1	20	Christopher Duplanty	1965	30	1.90 m (6 ft 3 in)	United States	10–8	Croatia	Atlanta 1996	Preliminary round Group B	24 Jul 1996	OR 1996 (p. 66)
2	16	Siniša Školneković	1968	28	1.94 m (6 ft 4 in)	Croatia	4–4; 7–6 (aet)	Italy	Atlanta 1996	Semi-finals	27 Jul 1996	OR 1996 (p. 72)
3	17	Nikolay Maksimov	1972	27	1.90 m (6 ft 3 in)	Russia	6–4	Australia	Sydney 2000	Preliminary round Group A	23 Sep 2000	ORB 2000 (p. 66)
4	19	Stefano Tempesti	1979	29	2.05 m (6 ft 9 in)	Italy	10–10; 13–13 (aet); 3–4 (pso)	Australia	Beijing 2008	Classification round 7th–10th place	22 Aug 2008	ORB 2008 (p. 152)
5	16	Merrill Moses	1977	31	1.91 m (6 ft 3 in)	United States	10–5	Serbia	Beijing 2008	Semi-finals	22 Aug 2008	ORB 2008 (p. 158)
6	17	Stefano Tempesti (2)	1979	33	2.05 m (6 ft 9 in)	Italy	8–5	Australia	London 2012	Preliminary round Group A	29 Jul 2012	ORB 2012 (p. 377)
7	17	Dragoș Stoenescu	1979	33	1.96 m (6 ft 5 in)	Romania	13–4	Great Britain	London 2012	Preliminary round Group B	29 Jul 2012	ORB 2012 (p. 381)
8	16	Iñaki Aguilar	1983	28	1.89 m (6 ft 2 in)	Spain	11–9	Greece	London 2012	Preliminary round Group A	4 Aug 2012	ORB 2012 (p. 417)
9	16	Viktor Nagy	1984	32	1.98 m (6 ft 6 in)	Hungary	13–4	Brazil	Rio 2016	Classification round 5th–8th place	18 Aug 2016	ORB 2016 (p. 77)
#	Saves	Goalkeeper	Birth	Age	Height	For	Result	Against	Tournament	Round	Date	Ref

The following table shows the historical progression of the record of shots saved by a male water polo goalkeeper in a single Olympic match since 1996. Last updated: 1 April 2021.

Legend

- Team – Host team
- Player^{‡} – Player who won the tournament with his team
- OR – Official Reports
- ORB – Official Results Books

Historical progression of records: Most shots saved by a male goalkeeper, one match (statistics since 1996)
Saves	Achievement	Year	Goalkeeper	Age	Height	Men's team	Date	Duration of record	Ref
20	Set record	1996	Christopher Duplanty	30	1.90 m (6 ft 3 in)	United States	24 July 1996	30 years, 9 days	OR 1996 (p. 66)

==== One tournament ====
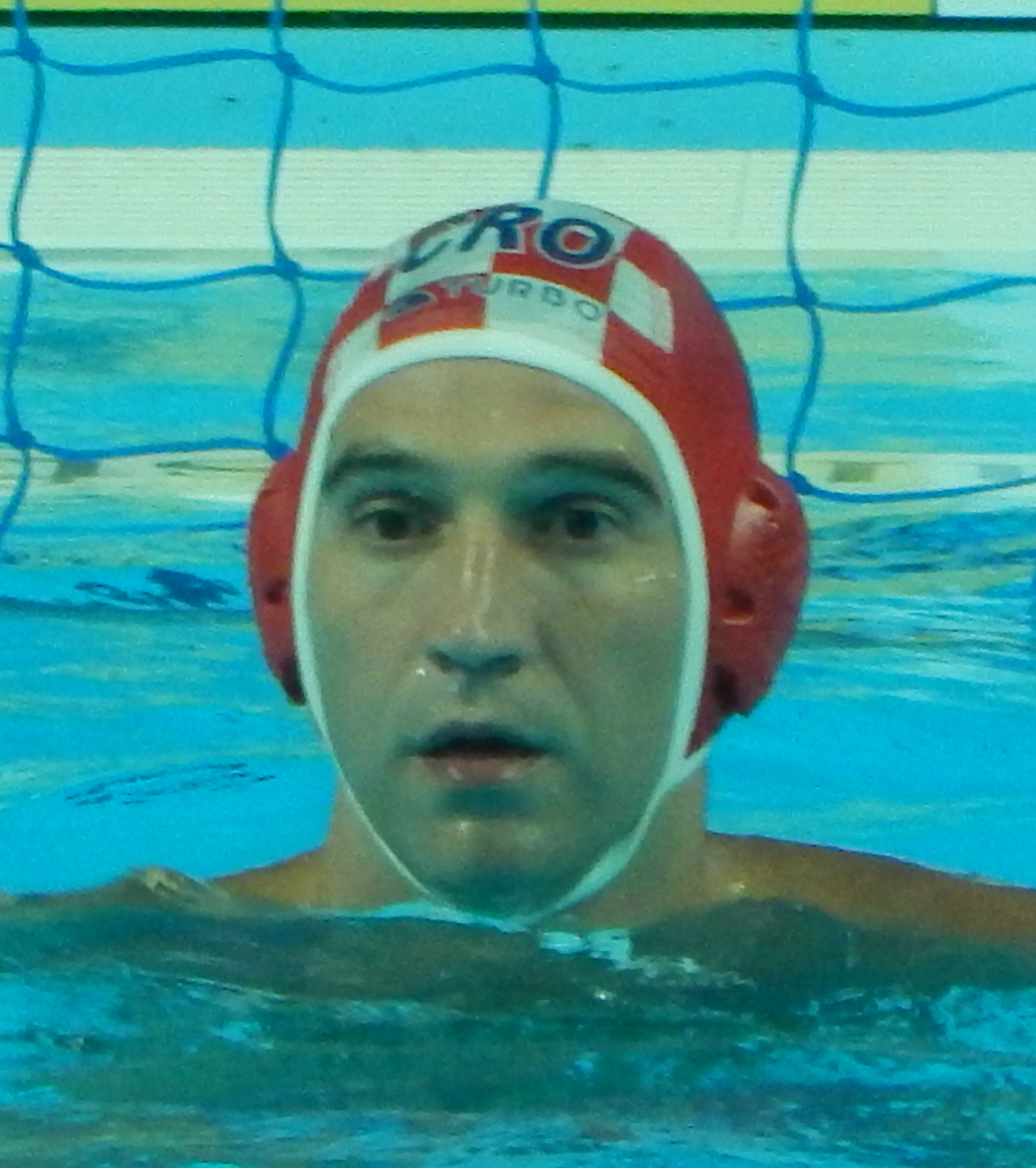
Josip Pavić saved 85 shots at the 2012 Games, helping Croatia win the Olympic title. He was named the Most Valuable Player of the men's water polo tournament.

The following table is pre-sorted by number of saves (in descending order), edition of the Olympics (in ascending order), number of matches played (in ascending order), name of the goalkeeper (in ascending order), respectively. Last updated: 1 April 2021.

Since 1996, six male goalkeepers have saved 75 or more shots in an Olympic water polo tournament.

Stefano Tempesti of Italy is the first water polo goalkeeper to achieve this feat twice. At the 2008 Olympics, Tempesti saved 83 shots. Four years later in London, he blocked 87 shots, setting the record for the most saves by a water polo goalkeeper in a single Olympic tournament.

Slobodan Soro is the second goalkeeper to achieve this feat twice. At the 2012 London Olympics, Soro saved 75 shots for Serbia. In Rio de Janeiro, he saved 81 shots for Brazil.

At the 2012 Summer Games, Josip Pavić saved 85 shots, including nine in the gold medal match, helping the Croatia team win the Olympics. He is the most efficient one among these six goalkeepers.

Legend and abbreviation

- Team – Host team
- Player^{‡} – Player who won the tournament with his team
- MP – Matches played
- Eff % – Save efficiency (Saves / Shots)
- 70.2% – Highest save efficiency

Male goalkeepers with 75 or more saves in an Olympic tournament (statistics since 1996)
Rk	Year	Goalkeeper	Birth	Age	Height	Saves	Shots	Eff %	MP	Saves per match	Men's team	Finish	Ref
1	2012	Stefano Tempesti	1979	33	2.05 m (6 ft 9 in)	87	147	59.2%	8	10.875	Italy	2nd of 12 teams	
2	2012	Josip Pavić^{‡}	1982	30	1.95 m (6 ft 5 in)	85	121	70.2%	8	10.625	Croatia	1st of 12 teams	
3	2008	Stefano Tempesti (2)	1979	29	2.05 m (6 ft 9 in)	83	169	49.1%	8	10.375	Italy	9th of 12 teams	
4	1996	Arie van de Bunt	1969	27	1.85 m (6 ft 1 in)	81	154	52.6%	8	10.125	Netherlands	10th of 12 teams	
4	2016	Slobodan Soro	1978	37	1.96 m (6 ft 5 in)	81	152	53.3%	8	10.125	Brazil	8th of 12 teams	
6	1996	Christopher Duplanty	1965	30	1.90 m (6 ft 3 in)	77	132	58.3%	8	9.625	United States	7th of 12 teams	
6	1996	Siniša Školneković	1968	28	1.94 m (6 ft 4 in)	77	135	57.0%	8	9.625	Croatia	2nd of 12 teams	
8	2012	Slobodan Soro (2)	1978	33	1.96 m (6 ft 5 in)	75	135	55.6%	8	9.375	Serbia	3rd of 12 teams	
Rk	Year	Goalkeeper	Birth	Age	Height	Saves	Shots	Eff %	MP	Saves per match	Men's team	Finish	Ref

Sources:

- Official Reports (PDF): 1996 (pp. 56–73);
- Official Results Books (PDF): 2000 (pp. 45–92), 2004 (p. 180), 2008 (p. 175), 2012 (p. 462), 2016 (p. 102).

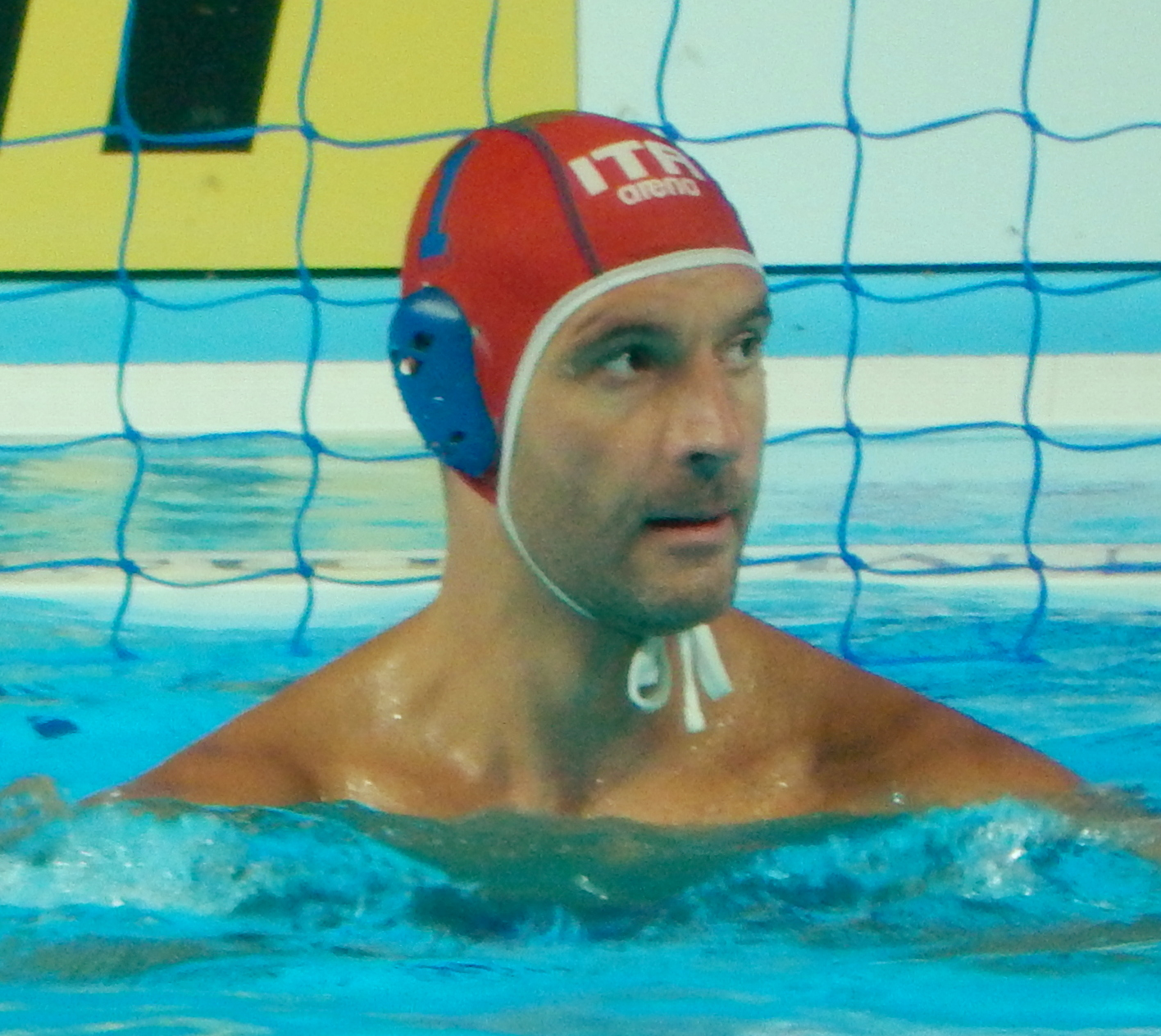
Stefano Tempesti of Italy saved 83 and 87 shots at the 2008 and 2012 Olympics, respectively.

The following table is pre-sorted by edition of the Olympics (in ascending order), number of matches played (in ascending order), name of the goalkeeper (in ascending order), respectively. Last updated: 1 April 2021.

At the 2004 Summer Games, Nikolay Maksimov saved 62 shots, including seven in the bronze medal match, helping Russia win the match.

Stefano Tempesti of Italy blocked 83 shots at the 2008 Olympics. In the 2012 edition, he saved 87 shots, helping the Italian team win the Olympic silver medal.

Slobodan Soro, representing Brazil, saved 81 shots at the 2016 Rio Olympics.

Legend and abbreviation

- Team – Host team
- Player^{‡} – Player who won the tournament with his team
- MP – Matches played
- Eff % – Save efficiency (Saves / Shots)

Male goalkeepers with the most saves in each Olympic tournament (statistics since 1996)
Year	Goalkeeper	Birth	Age	Height	Saves	Shots	Eff %	MP	Saves per match	Men's team	Finish	Ref
1996	Arie van de Bunt	1969	27	1.85 m (6 ft 1 in)	81	154	52.6%	8	10.125	Netherlands	10th of 12 teams	
2000	Dan Hackett	1970	30	1.98 m (6 ft 6 in)	70	135	51.9%	8	8.750	United States	6th of 12 teams	
2004	Nikolay Maksimov	1972	31	1.90 m (6 ft 3 in)	62	104	59.6%	8	7.750	Russia	3rd of 12 teams	
2008	Stefano Tempesti	1979	29	2.05 m (6 ft 9 in)	83	169	49.1%	8	10.375	Italy	9th of 12 teams	
2012	Stefano Tempesti (2)	1979	33	2.05 m (6 ft 9 in)	87	147	59.2%	8	10.875	Italy	2nd of 12 teams	
2016	Slobodan Soro	1978	37	1.96 m (6 ft 5 in)	81	152	53.3%	8	10.125	Brazil	8th of 12 teams	

Sources:

- Official Reports (PDF): 1996 (pp. 56–73);
- Official Results Books (PDF): 2000 (pp. 45–92), 2004 (p. 180), 2008 (p. 175), 2012 (p. 462), 2016 (p. 102).

The following table shows the historical progression of the record of shots saved by a male water polo goalkeeper in a single Olympic tournament since 1996. Last updated: 1 April 2021.

Legend

- Team – Host team
- Player^{‡} – Player who won the tournament with his team

Historical progression of records: Most shots saved by a male goalkeeper, one tournament (statistics since 1996)
Saves	Achievement	Year	Goalkeeper	Age	Height	Men's team	Date	Duration of record	Ref
81	Set record	1996	Arie van de Bunt	27	1.85 m (6 ft 1 in)	Netherlands	28 July 1996	12 years, 27 days	
83	Broke record	2008	Stefano Tempesti	29	2.05 m (6 ft 9 in)	Italy	24 August 2008	3 years, 354 days	
87	Broke record	2012	Stefano Tempesti (2)	33	2.05 m (6 ft 9 in)	Italy	12 August 2012	13 years, 355 days	

==== All-time ====
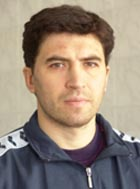
Russian-Kazakhstani goalkeeper Nikolay Maksimov saved 228 shots at four Olympics (1996–2004, 2012).

The following table is pre-sorted by number of total saves (in descending order), number of total Olympic matches played (in ascending order), date of the last Olympic match played (in ascending order), date of the first Olympic match played (in ascending order), name of the goalkeeper (in ascending order), respectively. Last updated: 1 April 2021.

Five-time Olympian Stefano Tempesti holds the record for the most shots saved by a water polo goalkeeper at the Olympics since 1996, with 295 saves.

Nikolay Maksimov, representing Russia, saved 178 shots at three Olympics (1996–2004). Eight years later, he represented Kazakhstan at the 2012 London Olympics, blocking 50 shots.

Slobodan Soro saved 132 shots in 2008 and 2012, representing Serbia. He was a member of the Brazil men's national team that competed at the 2016 Rio Olympics, blocking 81 shots.

Legend

- – Hosts

All-time male goalkeepers with 200 or more saves at the Olympics (statistics since 1996)
Rk	Goalkeeper	Birth	Height	Men's team	Total saves	Total matches played	Saves per match	Tournaments (saves)					Period (age of first/last)	Medals				Ref
Rk	Goalkeeper	Birth	Height	Men's team	Total saves	Total matches played	Saves per match	1	2	3	4	5	Period (age of first/last)	G	S	B	T	Ref
1	Stefano Tempesti	1979	2.05 m (6 ft 9 in)	Italy	295	39	7.564	2000 (24)	2004 (50)	2008 (83)	2012 (87)	2016 (51)	16 years (21/37)	0	1	1	2	
2	Nikolay Maksimov	1972	1.90 m (6 ft 3 in)	Russia	228	29	7.862	1996 (58)	2000 (58)	2004 (62)			16 years (23/39)	0	1	1	2	
2	Nikolay Maksimov	1972	1.90 m (6 ft 3 in)	Kazakhstan	228	29	7.862					2012 (50)	16 years (23/39)	0	1	1	2	
3	Slobodan Soro	1978	1.96 m (6 ft 5 in)	Serbia	213	24	8.875	2008 (57)	2012 (75)				8 years (29/37)	0	0	2	2	
3	Slobodan Soro	1978	1.96 m (6 ft 5 in)	Brazil	213	24	8.875			2016 (81)			8 years (29/37)	0	0	2	2	

Sources:

- Official Reports (PDF): 1996 (pp. 56–73);
- Official Results Books (PDF): 2000 (pp. 45–92), 2004 (p. 180), 2008 (p. 175), 2012 (p. 462), 2016 (p. 102).

The following table shows the historical progression of the record of total shots saved by a male water polo goalkeeper at the Summer Olympics since 1996. Last updated: 1 April 2021.

Legend

- Team – Host team
- Player^{‡} – Player who won the tournament with his team

Historical progression of records: Most shots saved by a male goalkeeper, all-time (statistics since 1996)
Total saves	Achievement	Year	Goalkeeper	Age	Height	Men's team	Date	Duration of record	Ref
146	Set record	2000	Arie van de Bunt	31	1.85 m (6 ft 1 in)	Netherlands	1 October 2000	3 years, 333 days	
178	Broke record	2004	Nikolay Maksimov	31	1.90 m (6 ft 3 in)	Russia	29 August 2004	7 years, 349 days	
244	Broke record	2012	Stefano Tempesti	33	2.05 m (6 ft 9 in)	Italy	12 August 2012	4 years, 8 days	
295	Broke record	2016	Stefano Tempesti (2)	37	2.05 m (6 ft 9 in)	Italy	20 August 2016	9 years, 347 days	

== Flag bearers ==
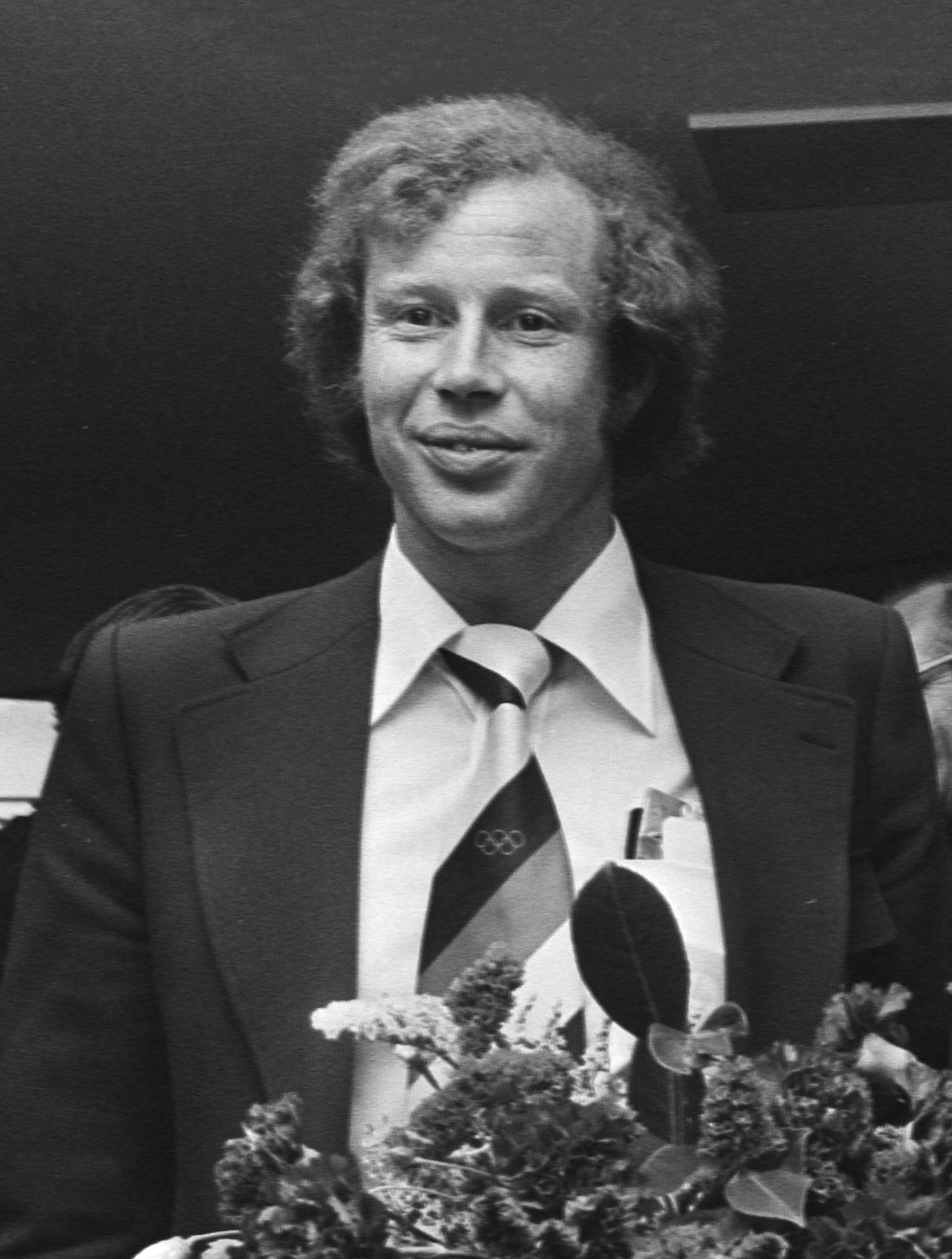
Evert Kroon was the flag bearer for the Netherlands at the closing ceremony of the 1976 Olympics.

Some sportspeople were chosen to carry the national flag of their country at the opening and closing ceremonies of the Olympic Games. As of the 2020 Summer Olympics, six male water polo goalkeepers were given the honour.

On 6 July 1912, Charles Smith of Great Britain carried the national flag at the opening ceremony of the 1912 Games in Stockholm, becoming the first water polo player to be a flag bearer at the opening and closing ceremonies of the Olympics. Seven days later, He won his second Olympic gold medal with his teammates.

Zdravko-Ćiro Kovačić, representing Yugoslavia, was the flag bearer during the opening ceremony at the 1956 Summer Olympics in Melbourne.

After winning bronze in the men's tournament, Evert Kroon, the starting goalkeeper of the Dutch water polo team, carried the national flag of the Netherlands at the closing ceremony of the 1976 Montreal Olympics.

Forty years later, Josip Pavić of Croatia was the flag bearer during the opening ceremony at the 2016 Summer Olympics in Rio de Janeiro, becoming the first water polo goalkeeper to be given the honour in the 21st century.

Legend

- 1912 O – Opening ceremony of the 1912 Summer Olympics
- 1976 C – Closing ceremony of the 1976 Summer Olympics
- – Hosts
- Flag bearer^{‡} – Flag bearer who won the tournament with his team

Male water polo goalkeepers who were flag bearers at the opening and closing ceremonies of the Olympic Games
#	Year	Country	Flag bearer (goalkeeper)	Birth	Age	Height	Team	Water polo tournaments					Period (age of first/last)	Medals				Ref
#	Year	Country	Flag bearer (goalkeeper)	Birth	Age	Height	Team	1	2	3	4	5	Period (age of first/last)	G	S	B	T	Ref
1	1912 O	Great Britain	Charles Smith^{‡}	1879	33	1.86 m (6 ft 1 in)	Great Britain	1908	1912	1920	1924		16 years (29/45)	3	0	0	3	
2	1928 O	France	Jean Thorailler	1888	40		France	1912	1920				8 years (24/32)	0	0	0	0	
3	1952 O	Egypt	Ahmed Fouad Nessim	1924	27		Egypt	1948	1952				4 years (23/27)	0	0	0	0	
4	1956 O	Yugoslavia	Zdravko-Ćiro Kovačić	1925	31		Yugoslavia	1948	1952	1956			8 years (23/31)	0	2	0	2	
5	1976 C	Netherlands	Evert Kroon	1946	29	1.92 m (6 ft 4 in)	Netherlands	1968	1972	1976			8 years (22/29)	0	0	1	1	
6	2016 O	Croatia	Josip Pavić	1982	34	1.95 m (6 ft 5 in)	Croatia	2008	2012	2016			8 years (26/34)	1	1	0	2	
#	Year	Country	Flag bearer (goalkeeper)	Birth	Age	Height	Team	1	2	3	4	5	Period (age of first/last)	G	S	B	T	Ref
#	Year	Country	Flag bearer (goalkeeper)	Birth	Age	Height	Team	Water polo tournaments					Period (age of first/last)	Medals				Ref

== Goalkeepers by team ==
The following tables are pre-sorted by edition of the Olympics (in ascending order), cap number or name of the goalkeeper (in ascending order), respectively.

Legend

- Year^{*} – As host team
- Team^{†} – Defunct team

=== Argentina ===
- Men's national team: Argentina
- Team appearances: 4 (1928, 1948–1952, 1960)
- As host team: —

=== Australia ===
- Men's national team: Australia
- Team appearances: 17 (1948–1964, 1972–1992, 2000^{*}–2020)
- As host team: 1956^{*}, 2000^{*}
- Last updated: 27 July 2021.

Legend and abbreviation

- – Hosts
- Eff % – Save efficiency (Saves / Shots)

Year	Cap No.	Goalkeeper	Birth	Age	ISHOF member	Note	Ref
1948		Ben Dalley	1916	32		Starting goalkeeper	
1948		(Unknown)					
1952		Doug Laing	1931	21		Starting goalkeeper	
1952		(Unknown)					
1956		Doug Laing (2)	1931	25			
1956		Bill McCabe	1935	21			
1960		Michael Withers	1938	22		Starting goalkeeper	
1960		(Unknown)					
1964	1	Michael Withers (2)	1938	26		Starting goalkeeper	
1964		(Unknown)					
1972	1	Michael Withers (3)	1938	34			
1972	13	Bill Tilley	1938	33			
1976	1	Paul Williams	1955	21			
1976	11	Rodney Woods	1954	21			
1980	1	Michael Turner	1951	29			
1980	11	Andrew Steward	1954	25			
1984	1	Michael Turner (2)	1951	33			
1984	13	Glenn Townsend	1962	22			
1988	1	Glenn Townsend (2)	1962	26			
1988	13	Donald Cameron	1954	34			
1992	1	Glenn Townsend (3)	1962	30			
1992	9	Guy Newman	1969	23			
Year	Cap No.	Goalkeeper	Birth	Age	ISHOF member	Note	Ref

Year	Cap No.	Goalkeeper	Birth	Age	Saves	Shots	Eff %	ISHOF member	Note	Ref
2000	1	Eddie Denis	1970	29	56	107	52.3%		Starting goalkeeper	
2000	13	Rafael Sterk	1978	22	8	18	44.4%			
2004	1	James Stanton	1983	21	57	108	52.8%		Starting goalkeeper	
2004	13	Rafael Sterk (2)	1978	26	1	3	33.3%			
2008	1	James Stanton (2)	1983	25	48	109	44.0%		Starting goalkeeper	
2008	13	Rafael Sterk (3)	1978	30	5	9	55.6%			
2012	1	Joel Dennerley	1987	25	51	104	49.0%		Starting goalkeeper	
2012	13	James Clark	1991	21	15	36	41.7%			
2016	1	Joel Dennerley (2)	1987	29	29	51	56.9%			
2016	13	James Stanton (3)	1983	33	22	40	55.0%			
2020	1	Anthony Hrysanthos	1995	25						
2020	13	Joel Dennerley (3)	1987	34						
Year	Cap No.	Goalkeeper	Birth	Age	Saves	Shots	Eff %	ISHOF member	Note	Ref

- Official Results Books (PDF): 2000 (pp. 48, 52, 56, 65–66, 71, 73, 76), 2004 (pp. 187–188), 2008 (pp. 181–182), 2012 (pp. 468–469), 2016 (pp. 103–104).

=== Austria ===
- Men's national team: Austria
- Team appearances: 3 (1912, 1936, 1952)
- As host team: —

=== Belgium ===
- Men's national team: Belgium
- Team appearances: 11 (1900, 1908–1928, 1936–1952, 1960–1964)
- As host team: 1920^{*}
- Last updated: 1 April 2021.

Legend

- – Hosts

Year	Cap No.	Goalkeeper	Birth	Age	ISHOF member	Note	Ref
1900 }} (silver)		Albert Michant				Starting goalkeeper	
1900 }} (silver)		(Unknown)					
1908 }} (silver)		Albert Michant (2)				Starting goalkeeper	
1908 }} (silver)		(Unknown)					
1912 }} (bronze)		Albert Durant	1892	20		Starting goalkeeper	
1912 }} (bronze)		(Unknown)					
1920 }} (silver)		Albert Durant (2)	1892	28		Starting goalkeeper	
1920 }} (silver)		(Unknown)					
1924 }} (silver)		Albert Durant (3)	1892	32		Starting goalkeeper	
1924 }} (silver)		(Unknown)					
1928		Jules Brandeleer				Starting goalkeeper	
1928		(Unknown)					
1936 }} (bronze)		Henri Disy	1913	22		Starting goalkeeper	
1936 }} (bronze)		(Unknown)					
1948		Théo-Léo De Smet	1917	30		Starting goalkeeper	
1948		(Unknown)					
1952		Théo-Léo De Smet (2)	1917	34			
1952		François Maesschalck	1921	30			
1960		Bruno De Hesselle	1941	18		Starting goalkeeper	
1960		(Unknown)					
1964	1	Bruno De Hesselle (2)	1941	23		Starting goalkeeper	
1964		(Unknown)					
Year	Cap No.	Goalkeeper	Birth	Age	ISHOF member	Note	Ref

=== Brazil ===
- Men's national team: Brazil
- Team appearances: 8 (1920, 1932, 1952, 1960–1968, 1984, 2016^{*})
- As host team: 2016^{*}
- Last updated: 1 April 2021.

Legend and abbreviation

- – Hosts
- Eff % – Save efficiency (Saves / Shots)

Year	Cap No.	Goalkeeper	Birth	Age	ISHOF member	Note	Ref
1920		Agostinho Sampaio de Sá	1897	23		Starting goalkeeper	
1920		(Unknown)					
1932		Luiz da Silva	1903	28–29		Starting goalkeeper	
1932		(Unknown)					
1952		Lucio Figueirêdo	1927	24			
1952		Henrique Melmann	1931	21			
1960		Luiz Daniel	1936	23		Starting goalkeeper	
1960		(Unknown)					
1964		Luiz Daniel (2)	1936	28		Starting goalkeeper	
1964		(Unknown)					
1968	1	Arnaldo Marsili	1947	21		Starting goalkeeper	
1968		(Unknown)					
1984	1	Roberto Borelli	1963	20		Starting goalkeeper	
1984		(Unknown)					
Year	Cap No.	Goalkeeper	Birth	Age	ISHOF member	Note	Ref

Year	Cap No.	Goalkeeper	Birth	Age	Saves	Shots	Eff %	ISHOF member	Note	Ref
2016	1	Slobodan Soro (3)	1978	37	81	152	53.3%		Starting goalkeeper	
2016	13	Vinicius Antonelli	1990	26	0	0	—			

- Official Results Books (PDF): 2016 (pp. 106–107).

Note:

- Slobodan Soro is also listed in section Serbia.

=== Bulgaria ===
- Men's national team: Bulgaria
- Team appearances: 2 (1972, 1980)
- As host team: —

=== Canada ===
- Men's national team: Canada
- Team appearances: 4 (1972–1976^{*}, 1984, 2008)
- As host team: 1976^{*}
- Last updated: 1 April 2021.

Legend and abbreviation

- – Hosts
- Eff % – Save efficiency (Saves / Shots)

Year	Cap No.	Goalkeeper	Birth	Age	ISHOF member	Note	Ref
1972	1	William Van der Pol	1938	34			
1972	11	Guy Leclerc	1955	16			
1976	1	Guy Leclerc (2)	1955	20		Starting goalkeeper	
1976		(Unknown)					
1984	1	Rick Zayonc	1959	24		Starting goalkeeper	
1984		(Unknown)					

Year	Cap No.	Goalkeeper	Birth	Age	Saves	Shots	Eff %	ISHOF member	Note	Ref
2008	1	Robin Randall	1980	28	55	129	42.6%		Starting goalkeeper	
2008	13	Nic Youngblud	1981	27	13	20	65.0%			

- Official Results Books (PDF): 2008 (pp. 184–185).

=== Chile ===
- Men's national team: Chile
- Team appearances: 1 (1948)
- As host team: —

=== China ===
- Men's national team: China
- Team appearances: 3 (1984–1988, 2008^{*})
- As host team: 2008^{*}
- Last updated: 1 April 2021.

Legend and abbreviation

- – Hosts
- Eff % – Save efficiency (Saves / Shots)

Year	Cap No.	Goalkeeper	Birth	Age	Saves	Shots	Eff %	ISHOF member	Note	Ref
2008	1	Ge Weiqing	1977	31	58	143	40.6%		Starting goalkeeper	
2008	13	Ma Jianjun	1984	23	0	0	—			

- Official Results Books (PDF): 2008 (pp. 187–188).

=== Croatia ===
- Men's national team: Croatia
- Team appearances: 7 (1996–2020)
- As host team: —
- Related team: Yugoslavia^{†}
- Last updated: 27 July 2021.

Abbreviation

- Eff % – Save efficiency (Saves / Shots)

Year	Cap No.	Goalkeeper	Birth	Age	Saves	Shots	Eff %	ISHOF member	Note	Ref
1996 (silver)	1	Siniša Školneković	1968	28	77	135	57.0%		Starting goalkeeper	
1996 (silver)	12	Maro Balić	1971	25	0	0	—			
2000	1	Siniša Školneković (2)	1968	32	33	70	47.1%			
2000	12	Frano Vićan	1976	24	23	42	54.8%			
2004	1	Frano Vićan (2)	1976	28	41	81	50.6%		Starting goalkeeper	
2004	5	Goran Volarević	1977	27	11	32	34.4%			
2008	1	Frano Vićan (3)	1976	32	49	94	52.1%		Starting goalkeeper	
2008	13	Josip Pavić	1982	26	5	9	55.6%			
2012 (gold)	1	Josip Pavić (2)	1982	30	85	121	70.2%		Starting goalkeeper	
2012 (gold)	13	Frano Vićan (4)	1976	36	10	16	62.5%			
2016 (silver)	1	Josip Pavić (3)	1982	34	24	45	53.3%		Flag bearer for Croatia	
2016 (silver)	13	Marko Bijač	1991	25	57	98	58.2%			
2020	1	Marko Bijač (2)	1991	30						
2020	13	Ivan Marcelić	1994	27						
Year	Cap No.	Goalkeeper	Birth	Age	Saves	Shots	Eff %	ISHOF member	Note	Ref

Sources:

- Official Reports (PDF): 1996 (pp. 62–66, 70, 72–73);
- Official Results Books (PDF): 2000 (pp. 48, 51, 54, 79, 82, 86–87, 92), 2004 (pp. 191–192), 2008 (pp. 190–191), 2012 (pp. 471–472), 2016 (pp. 109–110).

=== Cuba ===
- Men's national team: Cuba
- Team appearances: 5 (1968–1980, 1992)
- As host team: —

=== Czechoslovakia ===
- Men's national team: Czechoslovakia^{†}
- Team appearances: 5 (1920–1928, 1936, 1992)
- As host team: —
- Related team: Slovakia

=== East Germany ===
- Men's national team: East Germany^{†}
- Team appearances: 1 (1968)
- As host team: —
- Related teams: Germany, United Team of Germany^{†}
- Last updated: 1 April 2021.

Year	Cap No.	Goalkeeper	Birth	Age	ISHOF member	Note	Ref
1968	1	Hans-Georg Fehn	1943	25			
1968	13	Peter Schmidt (2)	1937	30			

Note:

- Peter Schmidt is also listed in section United Team of Germany.

=== Egypt ===
- Men's national team: Egypt
- Team appearances: 6 (1948–1952, 1960–1968, 2004)
- As host team: —
- Last updated: 1 April 2021.

Abbreviation

- Eff % – Save efficiency (Saves / Shots)

Year	Cap No.	Goalkeeper	Birth	Age	ISHOF member	Note	Ref
1948		Ahmed Fouad Nessim	1924	23		Starting goalkeeper	
1948		(Unknown)					
1952		Ahmed Fouad Nessim (2)	1924	27		Flag bearer for Egypt; Starting goalkeeper	
1952		(Unknown)					
1960		Mohamed Azmi	1921	38–39			
1960		Gamal El-Nazer	1930	30			
1964		Mohamed Khalil	1939	25			
1964		(Unknown)					
1968	1	Mohamed Abid Soliman	1945	23			
1968	13	(Unknown)					

Year	Cap No.	Goalkeeper	Birth	Age	Saves	Shots	Eff %	ISHOF member	Note	Ref
2004	1	Amr Mohamed	1974	30	41	135	30.4%		The only goalkeeper in the squad	

- Official Results Books (PDF): 2004 (pp. 195–196).

=== France ===
- Men's national team: France
- Team appearances: 11 (1900^{*}, 1912–1928, 1936–1948, 1960, 1988–1992, 2016)
- As host team: 1900^{*}, 1924^{*}
- Last updated: 1 April 2021.

Legend and abbreviation

- – Hosts
- Eff % – Save efficiency (Saves / Shots)

Year	Cap No.	Goalkeeper	Birth	Age	ISHOF member	Note	Ref
1900 }} (bronze)		(Unknown)					
1912		Jean Thorailler	1888	24		The only goalkeeper in the squad	
1920		Jean Thorailler (2)	1888	32		The only goalkeeper in the squad	
1924 (gold)		Paul Dujardin	1894	30		The only goalkeeper in the squad	
1928 }} (bronze)		Paul Dujardin (2)	1894	34		Starting goalkeeper	
1928 }} (bronze)		(Unknown)					
1936		Georges Delporte	1912	24		Starting goalkeeper	
1936		(Unknown)					
1948		François Débonnet	1931	16–17			
1948		René Massol	1927	21			
1960		Gérard Faetibolt	1932	28			
1960		Roland Moellé	1940	20			
1988	1	Arnaud Bouet	1960	28			
1988	13	Christian Volpi	1965	23			
1992	1	Jean-Marie Olivon	1967	25			
1992	12	Christophe Gautier	1966	26			
Year	Cap No.	Goalkeeper	Birth	Age	ISHOF member	Note	Ref

Year	Cap No.	Goalkeeper	Birth	Age	Saves	Shots	Eff %	ISHOF member	Note	Ref
2016	1	Rémi Garsau	1984	32	46	88	52.3%		Starting goalkeeper	
2016	13	Jonathan Moriamé	1984	32	0	0	—			

- Official Results Books (PDF): 2016 (pp. 114–115).

=== Germany ===
- Men's national team: Germany
- Team appearances: 9 (1900, 1928–1936^{*}, 1952, 1992–1996, 2004–2008)
- As host team: 1936^{*}
- Related teams: United Team of Germany^{†}, East Germany^{†}, West Germany^{†}
- Last updated: 1 April 2021.

Legend and abbreviation

- – Hosts
- Eff % – Save efficiency (Saves / Shots)

Year	Cap No.	Goalkeeper	Birth	Age	ISHOF member	Note	Ref
1900		Georg Hax	1870	29		The only goalkeeper in the squad	
1928 (gold)		Johann Blank	1904	24			
1928 (gold)		Erich Rademacher	1901	27	1972		
1932 (silver)		Hans Eckstein	1908	23			
1932 (silver)		Erich Rademacher (2)	1901	31	1972		
1936 (silver)		Paul Klingenburg	1907	28			
1936 (silver)		Fritz Stolze	1910	25			
1952		Emil Bildstein	1931	21			
1952		Günter Heine	1919	32			
1992	1	Ingo Borgmann (2)	1965	27			
1992	5	Peter Röhle (4)	1957	35			

Year	Cap No.	Goalkeeper	Birth	Age	Saves	Shots	Eff %	ISHOF member	Note	Ref
1996	1	Ingo Borgmann (3)	1965	31	51	111	45.9%		Starting goalkeeper	
1996	9	Daniel Voß	1971	25	2	3	66.7%			
2004	1	Alexander Tchigir (2)	1968	35	39	80	48.8%		Starting goalkeeper	
2004	2	Michael Zellmer	1977	27	3	6	50.0%			
2008	1	Alexander Tchigir (3)	1968	39	63	130	48.5%		Starting goalkeeper	
2008	13	Michael Zellmer (2)	1977	31	0	0	—			

Sources:

- Official Reports (PDF): 1996 (pp. 57–61, 67–69);
- Official Results Books (PDF): 2004 (pp. 199–200), 2008 (pp. 196–197).

Notes:

- Emil Bildstein is also listed in section United Team of Germany.
- Ingo Borgmann is also listed in section West Germany.
- Peter Röhle is also listed in section West Germany.
- Alexander Tchigir is also listed in section Unified Team.

=== Great Britain ===
- Men's national team: Great Britain
- Team appearances: 11 (1900, 1908^{*}–1928, 1936–1956, 2012^{*})
- As host team: 1908^{*}, 1948^{*}, 2012^{*}
- Last updated: 1 April 2021.

Legend and abbreviation

- – Hosts
- Eff % – Save efficiency (Saves / Shots)

Year	Cap No.	Goalkeeper	Birth	Age	ISHOF member	Note	Ref
1900 (gold)		William Henry	1859	41	1974	The only goalkeeper in the squad	
1908 (gold)		Charles Smith	1879	29	1981	The only goalkeeper in the squad	
1912 (gold)		Charles Smith (2)	1879	33	1981	Flag bearer for Great Britain; The only goalkeeper in the squad	
1920 (gold)		Charles Smith (3)	1879	41	1981	The only goalkeeper in the squad	
1924		Charles Smith (4)	1879	45	1981	Starting goalkeeper	
1924		(Unknown)					
1928		Leslie Ablett	1904	24			
1928		William Quick	1902	26			
1936		Leslie Ablett (2)	1904	32			
1936		Alfred North	1908	20			
1948		Ian Johnson	1930	17–18		Starting goalkeeper	
1948		(Unknown)					
1952		Ian Johnson (2)	1930	21–22		Starting goalkeeper	
1952		(Unknown)					
1956		Arthur Grady	1922	34		Starting goalkeeper	
1956		(Unknown)					
Year	Cap No.	Goalkeeper	Birth	Age	ISHOF member	Note	Ref

Year	Cap No.	Goalkeeper	Birth	Age	Saves	Shots	Eff %	ISHOF member	Note	Ref
2012	1	Edward Scott	1988	24	18	52	34.6%			
2012	13	Matthew Holland	1989	23	29	72	40.3%			

- Official Results Books (PDF): 2012 (pp. 476–477).

=== Greece ===
- Men's national team: Greece
- Team appearances: 16 (1920–1924, 1948, 1968–1972, 1980–2020)
- As host team: 2004^{*}
- Last updated: 27 July 2021.

Legend and abbreviation

- – Hosts
- Eff % – Save efficiency (Saves / Shots)

Year	Cap No.	Goalkeeper	Birth	Age	ISHOF member	Note	Ref
1920		Nikolaos Baltatzis-Mavrokordatos	1897	22–23			
1920		Konstantinos Nikolopoulos					
1924		Nikolaos Baltatzis-Mavrokordatos (2)	1897	26–27		Starting goalkeeper	
1924		(Unknown)					
1948		Alexandros Monastiriotis				Starting goalkeeper	
1948		(Unknown)					
1968	1	Ioannis Thymaras	1934	33–34			
1968	11	Takis Michalos	1947	20			
1972	1	Dimitrios Konstas					
1972	11	Takis Michalos (2)	1947	24			
1980	1	Ioannis Vossos	1960	19			
1980	11	Ioannis Giannouris	1958	22			
1984	1	Ioannis Vossos (2)	1960	23			
1984	13	Stavros Giannopoulos	1961	23			
1988	1	Nikolaos Christoforidis	1965	23			
1988	12	Evangelos Patras	1968	19			
1992	1	Evangelos Patras (2)	1968	23			
1992	13	Gerasimos Voltirakis	1968	24			
Year	Cap No.	Goalkeeper	Birth	Age	ISHOF member	Note	Ref

Year	Cap No.	Goalkeeper	Birth	Age	Saves	Shots	Eff %	ISHOF member	Note	Ref
1996	1	Gerasimos Voltirakis (2)	1968	28	64	124	51.6%		Starting goalkeeper	
1996	13	Evangelos Patras (3)	1968	27	1	7	14.3%			
2000	1	Georgios Reppas	1974	25	7	23	30.4%			
2000	6	Nikolaos Deligiannis	1976	24	48	97	49.5%		Starting goalkeeper	
2004	1	Georgios Reppas (2)	1974	29	18	37	48.6%			
2004	12	Nikolaos Deligiannis (2)	1976	27	31	52	59.6%			
2008	1	Nikolaos Deligiannis (3)	1976	31	38	82	46.3%			
2008	13	Georgios Reppas (3)	1974	33	28	65	43.1%			
2012	1	Nikolaos Deligiannis (4)	1976	35	45	83	54.2%		Starting goalkeeper	
2012	13	Filippos Karampetsos	1977	34	6	11	54.5%			
2016	1	Konstantinos Flegkas	1988	28	56	120	46.7%		Starting goalkeeper	
2016	13	Stefanos Galanopoulos	1993	23	1	5	20.0%			
2020	1	Emmanouil Zerdevas	1997	23						
2020	13	Konstantinos Galanidis	1990	30						
Year	Cap No.	Goalkeeper	Birth	Age	Saves	Shots	Eff %	ISHOF member	Note	Ref

Sources:

- Official Reports (PDF): 1996 (pp. 62–66, 69, 71–72);
- Official Results Books (PDF): 2000 (pp. 57, 59, 61, 80–81, 86, 88, 91), 2004 (pp. 203–204), 2008 (pp. 199–200), 2012 (pp. 478–479), 2016 (pp. 117–118).

=== Hungary ===
- Men's national team: Hungary
- Team appearances: 23 (1912, 1924–1980, 1988–2020)
- As host team: —
- Last updated: 27 July 2021.

Abbreviation

- Eff % – Save efficiency (Saves / Shots)

Year	Cap No.	Goalkeeper	Birth	Age	ISHOF member	Note	Ref
1912		János Wenk	1894	18		The only goalkeeper in the squad	
1924		István Barta	1895	28		Starting goalkeeper	
1924		(Unknown)					
1928 }} (silver)		István Barta (2)	1895	32		Starting goalkeeper	
1928 }} (silver)		(Unknown)					
1932 (gold)		István Barta (3)	1895	37			
1932 (gold)		György Bródy	1908	24			
1936 (gold)		György Bródy (2)	1908	28			
1936 (gold)		György Kutasi	1910	25			
1948 }} (silver)		Endre Győrfi	1920	28			
1948 }} (silver)		László Jeney	1923	25			
1952 (gold)		Róbert Antal	1921	31			
1952 (gold)		László Jeney (2)	1923	29			
1956 (gold)		Ottó Boros	1929	27			
1956 (gold)		László Jeney (3)	1923	33			
1960 }} (bronze)		Ottó Boros (2)	1929	31			
1960 }} (bronze)		László Jeney (4)	1923	37			
1964 (gold)		Miklós Ambrus	1933	31			
1964 (gold)		Ottó Boros (3)	1929	35			
1968 }} (bronze)	1	Endre Molnár	1945	23			
1968 }} (bronze)	11	János Steinmetz	1947	21			
1972 }} (silver)	1	Endre Molnár (2)	1945	27			
1972 }} (silver)	11	Tibor Cservenyák	1948	24			
1976 (gold)	1	Endre Molnár (3)	1945	31			
1976 (gold)	11	Tibor Cservenyák (2)	1948	27			
1980 }} (bronze)	1	Endre Molnár (4)	1945	35			
1980 }} (bronze)	11	Károly Hauszler	1952	28			
1988	1	Péter Kuna	1965	23			
1988	12	Zoltán Kósz	1967	20			
1992	1	Gábor Nemes	1964	27			
1992	7	Péter Kuna (2)	1965	27			
Year	Cap No.	Goalkeeper	Birth	Age	ISHOF member	Note	Ref

Year	Cap No.	Goalkeeper	Birth	Age	Saves	Shots	Eff %	ISHOF member	Note	Ref
1996	1	Zoltán Kósz (2)	1967	28	57	121	47.1%		Starting goalkeeper	
1996	12	Péter Kuna (3)	1965	31	8	14	57.1%			
2000 (gold)	1	Zoltán Kósz (3)	1967	32	58	112	51.8%		Starting goalkeeper	
2000 (gold)	10	Zoltán Szécsi	1977	22	6	9	66.7%	2016		
2004 (gold)	1	Zoltán Szécsi (2)	1977	26	40	75	53.3%	2016	Starting goalkeeper	
2004 (gold)	10	István Gergely (2)	1976	28	8	12	66.7%			
2008 (gold)	1	Zoltán Szécsi (3)	1977	30	42	83	50.6%	2016	Starting goalkeeper	
2008 (gold)	13	István Gergely (3)	1976	32	24	38	63.2%			
2012	1	Zoltán Szécsi (4)	1977	34	44	94	46.8%	2016		
2012	13	Viktor Nagy	1984	28	38	68	55.9%			
2016	1	Viktor Nagy (2)	1984	32	67	118	56.8%		Starting goalkeeper	
2016	13	Attila Decker	1987	29	14	29	48.3%			
2020	1	Viktor Nagy (3)	1984	37						
2020	13	Soma Vogel	1997	24						
Year	Cap No.	Goalkeeper	Birth	Age	Saves	Shots	Eff %	ISHOF member	Note	Ref

Sources:

- Official Reports (PDF): 1996 (pp. 57–61, 69, 71, 73);
- Official Results Books (PDF): 2000 (pp. 45, 50, 55, 78, 81, 84, 87, 90), 2004 (pp. 207–208), 2008 (pp. 202–203), 2012 (pp. 481–482), 2016 (pp. 120–121).

Note:

- István Gergely is also listed in section Slovakia.

=== Iceland ===
- Men's national team: Iceland
- Team appearances: 1 (1936)
- As host team: —

=== India ===
- Men's national team: India
- Team appearances: 2 (1948–1952)
- As host team: —

=== Iran ===
- Men's national team: Iran
- Team appearances: 1 (1976)
- As host team: —

=== Republic of Ireland ===
- Men's national team: Ireland
- Team appearances: 2 (1924–1928)
- As host team: —

=== Italy ===
- Men's national team: Italy
- Team appearances: 21 (1920–1924, 1948–2020)
- As host team: 1960^{*}
- Last updated: 27 July 2021.

Legend and abbreviation

- – Hosts
- Eff % – Save efficiency (Saves / Shots)

Year	Cap No.	Goalkeeper	Birth	Age	ISHOF member	Note	Ref
1920		Salvatore Cabella	1896	23–24		Starting goalkeeper	
1920		(Unknown)					
1924		Mario Balla	1903	20–21		Starting goalkeeper	
1924		(Unknown)					
1948 (gold)		Pasquale Buonocore	1916	32		Starting goalkeeper	
1948 (gold)		(Unknown)					
1952 }} (bronze)		Raffaello Gambino	1928	24			
1952 }} (bronze)		Renato Traiola	1924	27			
1956		Cosimo Antonelli	1925	31			
1956		Enzo Cavazzoni	1932	24			
1960 (gold)		Dante Rossi	1936	24			
1960 (gold)		Brunello Spinelli	1939	21			
1964		Eugenio Merello	1940	24			
1964		Dante Rossi (2)	1936	28			
1968	1	Alberto Alberani	1947	21			
1968	11	Eugenio Merello (2)	1940	28			
1972	1	Alberto Alberani (2)	1947	25			
1972	11	Ferdinando Lignano	1948	28			
1976 }} (silver)	1	Alberto Alberani (3)	1947	29			
1976 }} (silver)	11	Umberto Panerai	1953	23			
1980	1	Alberto Alberani (4)	1947	33			
1980	11	Umberto Panerai (2)	1953	27			
1984	1	Roberto Gandolfi	1956	28			
1984	13	Umberto Panerai (3)	1953	31			
1988	1	Paolo Trapanese	1962	26			
1988	13	Gianni Averaimo	1964	24			
1992 (gold)	1	Francesco Attolico	1963	29			
1992 (gold)	13	Gianni Averaimo (2)	1964	27			
Year	Cap No.	Goalkeeper	Birth	Age	ISHOF member	Note	Ref

Year	Cap No.	Goalkeeper	Birth	Age	Saves	Shots	Eff %	ISHOF member	Note	Ref
1996 }} (bronze)	1	Francesco Attolico (2)	1963	33	44	110	40.0%		Starting goalkeeper	
1996 }} (bronze)	10	Marco Gerini	1971	24	6	15	40.0%			
2000	1	Francesco Attolico (3)	1963	37	28	61	45.9%			
2000	5	Stefano Tempesti	1979	21	24	43	55.8%			
2004	1	Stefano Tempesti (2)	1979	25	50	86	58.1%		Starting goalkeeper	
2004	5	Marco Gerini (2)	1971	33	0	4	0.0%			
2008	1	Stefano Tempesti (3)	1979	29	83	169	49.1%		Starting goalkeeper	
2008	13	Fabio Violetti	1974	34	0	0	—			
2012 }} (silver)	1	Stefano Tempesti (4)	1979	33	87	147	59.2%		Starting goalkeeper	
2012 }} (silver)	13	Giacomo Pastorino	1980	32	0	0	—			
2016 }} (bronze)	1	Stefano Tempesti (5)	1979	37	51	101	50.5%		Starting goalkeeper	
2016 }} (bronze)	13	Marco Del Lungo	1990	26	21	37	56.8%			
2020	1	Marco Del Lungo (2)	1990	31						
2020	13	Gianmarco Nicosia	1998	23						
Year	Cap No.	Goalkeeper	Birth	Age	Saves	Shots	Eff %	ISHOF member	Note	Ref

Sources:

- Official Reports (PDF): 1996 (pp. 62–66, 70, 72–73);
- Official Results Books (PDF): 2000 (pp. 47, 52, 55, 64, 68–69, 74, 76), 2004 (pp. 211–212), 2008 (pp. 205–206), 2012 (pp. 484–485), 2016 (pp. 123–124).

=== Japan ===
- Men's national team: Japan
- Team appearances: 9 (1932–1936, 1960–1972, 1984, 2016–2020)
- As host team: 1964, 2020^{*}
- Last updated: 27 July 2021.

Legend and abbreviation

- – Hosts
- Eff % – Save efficiency (Saves / Shots)

Year	Cap No.	Goalkeeper	Birth	Age	ISHOF member	Note	Ref
1932		Takashige Matsumoto	1908	23		Starting goalkeeper	
1932		(Unknown)					
1936		Jihei Furusho	1914	21		Starting goalkeeper	
1936		(Unknown)					
1960		Mineo Kato	1934	26		Starting goalkeeper	
1960		(Unknown)					
1964		Mineo Kato (2)	1934	30		Starting goalkeeper	
1964		(Unknown)					
1968	1	Tetsunosuke Ishii	1944	24		Starting goalkeeper	
1968		(Unknown)					
1972	1	Yukiharu Oshita	1949	23		Starting goalkeeper	
1972		(Unknown)					
1984	1	Etsuji Fujita	1961	23		Starting goalkeeper	
1984		(Unknown)					
Year	Cap No.	Goalkeeper	Birth	Age	ISHOF member	Note	Ref

Year	Cap No.	Goalkeeper	Birth	Age	Saves	Shots	Eff %	ISHOF member	Note	Ref
2016	1	Katsuyuki Tanamura	1989	27	52	113	46.0%		Starting goalkeeper	
2016	13	Tomoyoshi Fukushima	1993	23	0	0	—			
2020	1	Katsuyuki Tanamura (2)	1989	31						
2020	13	Tomoyoshi Fukushima (2)	1993	28						

- Official Results Books (PDF): 2016 (pp. 125–126).

=== Kazakhstan ===
- Men's national team: Kazakhstan
- Team appearances: 4 (2000–2004, 2012, 2020)
- As host team: —
- Related teams: Soviet Union^{†}, Unified Team^{†}
- Last updated: 27 July 2021.

Abbreviation

- Eff % – Save efficiency (Saves / Shots)

Year	Cap No.	Goalkeeper	Birth	Age	Saves	Shots	Eff %	ISHOF member	Note	Ref
2000	1	Konstantin Chernov	1967	32	52	96	54.2%		Starting goalkeeper	
2000	3	Alexandr Shvedov	1973	27	13	33	39.4%			
2004	1	Alexandr Shvedov (2)	1973	31	54	111	48.6%		Starting goalkeeper	
2004	13	Alexandr Polukhin	1961	42	2	4	50.0%			
2012	1	Nikolay Maksimov (4)	1972	39	50	103	48.5%		Starting goalkeeper	
2012	13	Alexandr Shvedov (3)	1973	39	0	0	—			
2020	1	Madikhan Makhmetov	1993	28						
2020	13	Pavel Lipilin	1999	22						
Year	Cap No.	Goalkeeper	Birth	Age	Saves	Shots	Eff %	ISHOF member	Note	Ref

- Official Results Books (PDF): 2000 (pp. 58–59, 62, 64, 67, 71–72, 77), 2004 (pp. 215–216), 2012 (pp. 486–487).

Note:

- Nikolay Maksimov is also listed in section Russia.

=== Luxembourg ===
- Men's national team: Luxembourg
- Team appearances: 1 (1928)
- As host team: —

=== Malta ===
- Men's national team: Malta
- Team appearances: 2 (1928, 1936)
- As host team: —

=== Mexico ===
- Men's national team: Mexico
- Team appearances: 4 (1952, 1968^{*}–1976)
- As host team: 1968^{*}

=== Montenegro ===
- Men's national team: Montenegro
- Team appearances: 4 (2008–2020)
- As host team: —
- Related teams: Yugoslavia^{†}, FR Yugoslavia^{†}, Serbia and Montenegro^{†}
- Last updated: 27 July 2021.

Abbreviation

- Eff % – Save efficiency (Saves / Shots)

Year	Cap No.	Goalkeeper	Birth	Age	Saves	Shots	Eff %	ISHOF member	Note	Ref
2008	1	Zdravko Radić	1979	29	12	18	66.7%			
2008	13	Miloš Šćepanović	1982	25	49	99	49.5%		Starting goalkeeper	
2012	1	Denis Šefik (3)	1976	35	10	16	62.5%			
2012	13	Miloš Šćepanović (2)	1982	29	59	122	48.4%		Starting goalkeeper	
2016	1	Zdravko Radić (2)	1979	37	5	20	25.0%			
2016	13	Miloš Šćepanović (3)	1982	33	52	102	51.0%		Starting goalkeeper	
2020	1	Slaven Kandić	1991	30						
2020	13	Petar Tešanović	1998	22						
Year	Cap No.	Goalkeeper	Birth	Age	Saves	Shots	Eff %	ISHOF member	Note	Ref

- Official Results Books (PDF): 2008 (pp. 208–209), 2012 (pp. 489–490), 2016 (pp. 128–129).

Note:

- Denis Šefik is also listed in section Serbia and Montenegro, and section Serbia.

=== Netherlands ===
- Men's national team: Netherlands
- Team appearances: 17 (1908, 1920–1928^{*}, 1936–1952, 1960–1984, 1992–2000)
- As host team: 1928^{*}
- Last updated: 1 April 2021.

Legend and abbreviation

- – Hosts
- Eff % – Save efficiency (Saves / Shots)

Year	Cap No.	Goalkeeper	Birth	Age	ISHOF member	Note	Ref
1908		Johan Rühl	1885	23		The only goalkeeper in the squad	
1920		Leen Hoogendijk	1890	30			
1920		Karel Struijs	1892	27			
1924		Karel Struijs (2)	1892	31		Starting goalkeeper	
1924		(Unknown)					
1928		Abraham van Olst	1897	30		Starting goalkeeper	
1928		(Unknown)					
1936		Herman Veenstra	1911	24			
1936		Joop van Woerkom	1912	24			
1948 }} (bronze)		Joop Rohner	1927	21			
1948 }} (bronze)		Piet Salomons	1924	24			
1952		Max van Gelder	1924	27		Starting goalkeeper	
1952		(Unknown)					
1960		Henk Hermsen	1937	23			
1960		Ben Kniest	1927	33			
1964	1	Henk Hermsen (2)	1937	27			
1964	11	Ben Kniest (2)	1927	37			
1968	1	Feike de Vries	1943	25			
1968	11	Evert Kroon	1946	22			
1972	1	Evert Kroon (2)	1946	25		Starting goalkeeper	
1972	11	Wim van de Schilde	1948	23			
1976 }} (bronze)	1	Evert Kroon (3)	1946	29		Starting goalkeeper Flag bearer for the Netherlands	
1976 }} (bronze)	11	Alex Boegschoten	1956	20			
1980	1	Wouly de Bie	1958	22			
1980	11	Ruud Misdorp	1952	28			
1984	1	Wouly de Bie (2)	1958	26			
1984	13	Ruud Misdorp (2)	1952	32			
1992	1	Arie van de Bunt	1969	23			
1992	13	Bert Brinkman	1968	24			
Year	Cap No.	Goalkeeper	Birth	Age	ISHOF member	Note	Ref

Year	Cap No.	Goalkeeper	Birth	Age	Saves	Shots	Eff %	ISHOF member	Note	Ref
1996	1	Arie van de Bunt (2)	1969	27	81	154	52.6%		Starting goalkeeper	
1996	11	Wim Vermeulen			0	0	—			
2000	1	Arie van de Bunt (3)	1969	31	65	140	46.4%		Starting goalkeeper	
2000	3	Wim Vermeulen (2)			0	0	—			

Sources:

- Official Reports (PDF): 1996 (pp. 57–61, 67–68);
- Official Results Books (PDF): 2000 (pp. 58, 60–61, 79, 83–84, 89, 91).

=== Portugal ===
- Men's national team: Portugal
- Team appearances: 1 (1952)
- As host team: —

=== Romania ===
- Men's national team: Romania
- Team appearances: 9 (1952–1964, 1972–1980, 1996, 2012)
- As host team: —
- Last updated: 1 April 2021.

Abbreviation

- Eff % – Save efficiency (Saves / Shots)

Year	Cap No.	Goalkeeper	Birth	Age	ISHOF member	Note	Ref
1952		Zoltan Norman	1919	32		Starting goalkeeper	
1952		(Unknown)					
1956		Iosif Deutsch	1932	23–24			
1956		Alexandru Marinescu	1932	24			
1960		Mircea Ştefănescu	1936	23		Starting goalkeeper	
1960		(Unknown)					
1964	1	Mircea Ştefănescu (2)	1936	27			
1964	11	Emil Mureşan	1939	25			
1972	1	Șerban Huber	1951	21			
1972	11	Cornel Frăţilă	1941	31			
1976	1	Florin Slăvei	1951	25			
1976	11	Doru Spînu	1955	20			
1980	1	Doru Spînu (2)	1955	24			
1980	11	Florin Slăvei (2)	1951	29			
Year	Cap No.	Goalkeeper	Birth	Age	ISHOF member	Note	Ref

Year	Cap No.	Goalkeeper	Birth	Age	Saves	Shots	Eff %	ISHOF member	Note	Ref
1996	1	Gelu Lisac	1967	28	41	100	41.0%		Starting goalkeeper	
1996	2	Robert Dinu	1974	22	10	24	41.7%			
2012	1	Dragoș Stoenescu	1979	33	48	97	49.5%		Starting goalkeeper	
2012	13	Mihai Drăgușin	1984	28	7	13	53.8%			

Sources:

- Official Reports (PDF): 1996 (pp. 62–69);
- Official Results Books (PDF): 2012 (pp. 491–492).

=== Russia ===
- Men's national team: Russia
- Team appearances: 3 (1996–2004)
- As host team: —
- Related teams: Soviet Union^{†}, Unified Team^{†}
- Last updated: 1 April 2021.

Abbreviation

- Eff % – Save efficiency (Saves / Shots)

Year	Cap No.	Goalkeeper	Birth	Age	Saves	Shots	Eff %	ISHOF member	Note	Ref
1996	1	Nikolay Maksimov	1972	23	58	115	50.4%		Starting goalkeeper	
1996	13	Dmitri Dugin	1968	27	6	21	28.6%			
2000 }} (silver)	1	Nikolay Maksimov (2)	1972	27	58	99	58.6%		Starting goalkeeper	
2000 }} (silver)	3	Dmitri Dugin (2)	1968	32	18	35	51.4%			
2004 }} (bronze)	1	Nikolay Maksimov (3)	1972	31	62	104	59.6%		Starting goalkeeper	
2004 }} (bronze)	2	Aleksandr Fyodorov	1981	23	2	5	40.0%			

Sources:

- Official Reports (PDF): 1996 (pp. 57–61, 70–72);
- Official Results Books (PDF): 2000 (pp. 45, 49, 53, 63, 66, 69, 72, 75), 2004 (pp. 219–220).

Note:

- Nikolay Maksimov is also listed in section Kazakhstan.

=== Serbia ===
- Men's national team: Serbia
- Team appearances: 4 (2008–2020)
- As host team: —
- Related teams: Yugoslavia^{†}, FR Yugoslavia^{†}, Serbia and Montenegro^{†}
- Last updated: 11 August 2024.

Abbreviation

- Eff % – Save efficiency (Saves / Shots)

Year	Cap No.	Goalkeeper	Birth	Age	Saves	Shots	Eff %	ISHOF member	Note	Ref
2008 }} (bronze)	1	Denis Šefik (2)	1976	31	22	43	51.2%			
2008 }} (bronze)	13	Slobodan Soro	1978	29	57	93	61.3%		Starting goalkeeper	
2012 }} (bronze)	1	Slobodan Soro (2)	1978	33	75	135	55.6%		Starting goalkeeper	
2012 }} (bronze)	13	Gojko Pijetlović	1983	29	11	17	64.7%			
2016 (gold)	1	Gojko Pijetlović (2)	1983	33	14	21	66.7%			
2016 (gold)	13	Branislav Mitrović	1985	31	60	119	50.4%		Starting goalkeeper	
2020 (gold)	1	Gojko Pijetlović (3)	1983	38	19	38	50.0%			
2020 (gold)	13	Branislav Mitrović (2)	1985	36	70	122	57.4%		Starting goalkeeper	
2024 (gold)	1	Radoslav Filipović	1997	27	59	143	41.3%		Starting goalkeeper	
2024 (gold)	13	Vladimir Mišović	2001	23	6	13	46.2%			
Year	Cap No.	Goalkeeper	Birth	Age	Saves	Shots	Eff %	ISHOF member	Note	Ref

- Official Results Books (PDF): 2008 (pp. 211–212), 2012 (pp. 494–495), 2016 (pp. 131–132).

Notes:

- Denis Šefik is also listed in section Serbia and Montenegro, and section Montenegro.
- Slobodan Soro is also listed in section Brazil.

=== Serbia and Montenegro ===
- Men's national team: Serbia and Montenegro^{†}
- Team appearances: 1 (2004)
- As host team: —
- Related teams: Yugoslavia^{†}, FR Yugoslavia^{†}, Montenegro, Serbia
- Last updated: 1 April 2021.

Abbreviation

- Eff % – Save efficiency (Saves / Shots)

Year	Cap No.	Goalkeeper	Birth	Age	Saves	Shots	Eff %	ISHOF member	Note	Ref
2004 (silver)	1	Denis Šefik	1976	27	60	102	58.8%		Starting goalkeeper	
2004 (silver)	13	Nikola Kuljača (2)	1974	30	0	0	—			

- Official Results Books (PDF): 2004 (pp. 223–224).

Notes:

- Nikola Kuljača is also listed in section FR Yugoslavia.
- Denis Šefik is also listed in section Serbia, and section Montenegro.

=== Singapore ===
- Men's national team: Singapore
- Team appearances: 1 (1956)
- As host team: —

=== Slovakia ===
- Men's national team: Slovakia
- Team appearances: 1 (2000)
- As host team: —
- Related team: Czechoslovakia^{†}
- Last updated: 1 April 2021.

Abbreviation

- Eff % – Save efficiency (Saves / Shots)

Year	Cap No.	Goalkeeper	Birth	Age	Saves	Shots	Eff %	ISHOF member	Note	Ref
2000	1	István Gergely	1976	24	44	110	40.0%		Starting goalkeeper	
2000	13	Michal Gogola	1980	20	11	36	30.6%			

- Official Results Books (PDF): 2000 (pp. 57, 60, 62–63, 68, 70, 73, 77).

Note:

- István Gergely is also listed in section Hungary.

=== South Africa ===
- Men's national team: South Africa
- Team appearances: 3 (1952, 1960, 2020)
- As host team: —
- Last updated: 27 July 2021.

Abbreviation

- Eff % – Save efficiency (Saves / Shots)

Year	Cap No.	Goalkeeper	Birth	Age	ISHOF member	Note	Ref
1952		William Aucamp	1932	20		Starting goalkeeper	
1952		(Unknown)					
1960		William Aucamp (2)	1932	28		Starting goalkeeper	
1960		(Unknown)					

Year	Cap No.	Goalkeeper	Birth	Age	Saves	Shots	Eff %	ISHOF member	Note	Ref
2020	1	Lwazi Madi	1994	26						
2020	13	Gareth May	1996	24						

=== South Korea ===
- Men's national team: South Korea
- Team appearances: 1 (1988^{*})
- As host team: 1988^{*}

=== Soviet Union ===
- Men's national team: Soviet Union^{†}
- Team appearances: 9 (1952–1980^{*}, 1988)
- As host team: 1980^{*}
- Related teams: Unified Team^{†}, Kazakhstan, Russia, Ukraine
- Last updated: 1 April 2021.

Legend

- – Hosts

Year	Cap No.	Goalkeeper	Birth	Age	ISHOF member	Note	Ref
1952		Boris Goykhman	1919	33		Starting goalkeeper	
1952		(Unknown)					
1956 (bronze)		Boris Goykhman (2)	1919	37			
1956 (bronze)		Mikhail Ryzhak	1927	29			
1960 (silver)		Leri Gogoladze	1938	22			
1960 (silver)		Boris Goykhman (3)	1919	41			
1964 (bronze)	1	Igor Grabovsky	1941	23			
1964 (bronze)	11	Eduard Egorov	1940	24			
1968 (silver)	1	Vadim Gulyayev	1941	27			
1968 (silver)	11	Oleg Bovin	1946	22			
1972 (gold)	1	Vadim Gulyayev (2)	1941	31			
1972 (gold)	11	Viacheslav Sobchenko	1949	23			
1976	1	Anatoly Klebanov	1952	23			
1976	11	Aleksandr Zakharov	1954	22			
1980 (gold)	1	Yevgeny Sharonov	1958	21	2003		
1980 (gold)	11	Viacheslav Sobchenko (2)	1949	31			
1988 (bronze)	1	Yevgeny Sharonov (2)	1958	29	2003		
1988 (bronze)	13	Mikheil Giorgadze	1961	27			
Year	Cap No.	Goalkeeper	Birth	Age	ISHOF member	Note	Ref

Note:

- Yevgeny Sharonov is also listed in section Unified Team.

=== Spain ===
- Men's national team: Spain
- Team appearances: 18 (1920–1928, 1948–1952, 1968–1972, 1980–2020)
- As host team: 1992^{*}
- Last updated: 27 July 2021.

Legend and abbreviation

- – Hosts
- Eff % – Save efficiency (Saves / Shots)

Year	Cap No.	Goalkeeper	Birth	Age	ISHOF member	Note	Ref
1920		Luis Gibert	1903	17		Starting goalkeeper	
1920		(Unknown)					
1924		Jaime Cruells	1906	18		Starting goalkeeper	
1924		(Unknown)					
1928		Gonzalo Jiménez	1902	26		Starting goalkeeper	
1928		(Unknown)					
1948		Joan Serra	1927	20		Starting goalkeeper	
1948		(Unknown)					
1952		Leandro Ribera Abad	1934	17		Starting goalkeeper	
1952		(Unknown)					
1968	1	Luis Bestit	1945	23			
1968	11	Vicente Brugat	1947	20			
1972	1	Salvador Franch	1949	23			
1972	11	Luis Bestit (2)	1945	27			
1980	1	Manuel Delgado	1955	25			
1980	11	Salvador Franch (2)	1949	31			
1984	1	Leandro Ribera Perpiñá	1962	22			
1984	13	Mariano Moya	1963	20			
1988	1	Jesús Rollán	1968	20	2012		
1988	11	Mariano Moya (2)	1963	24			
1992 }} (silver)	1	Jesús Rollán (2)	1968	24	2012	Starting goalkeeper	
1992 }} (silver)	12	Manuel Silvestre	1965	27			
Year	Cap No.	Goalkeeper	Birth	Age	ISHOF member	Note	Ref

Year	Cap No.	Goalkeeper	Birth	Age	Saves	Shots	Eff %	ISHOF member	Note	Ref
1996 (gold)	1	Jesús Rollán (3)	1968	28	62	110	56.4%	2012	Starting goalkeeper	
1996 (gold)	4	Ángel Andreo	1972	23	0	0	—			
2000	1	Jesús Rollán (4)	1968	32	58	116	50.0%	2012	Starting goalkeeper	
2000	2	Ángel Andreo (2)	1972	27	0	0	—			
2004	1	Jesús Rollán (5)	1968	36	5	7	71.4%	2012		
2004	2	Ángel Andreo (3)	1972	31	50	92	54.3%		Starting goalkeeper	
2008	1	Iñaki Aguilar	1983	24	58	107	54.2%		Starting goalkeeper	
2008	13	Ángel Andreo (4)	1972	35	1	4	25.0%			
2012	1	Iñaki Aguilar (2)	1983	28	52	98	53.1%			
2012	13	Daniel López	1980	32	26	54	48.1%			
2016	1	Iñaki Aguilar (3)	1983	32	16	26	61.5%			
2016	13	Daniel López (2)	1980	36	63	115	54.8%		Starting goalkeeper	
2020	1	Daniel López (3)	1980	41						
2020	13	Unai Aguirre	2002	19						
Year	Cap No.	Goalkeeper	Birth	Age	Saves	Shots	Eff %	ISHOF member	Note	Ref

Sources:

- Official Reports (PDF): 1996 (pp. 57–61, 70–71, 73);
- Official Results Books (PDF): 2000 (pp. 46, 49, 54, 65, 67, 70, 74–75), 2004 (pp. 227–228), 2008 (pp. 193–194), 2012 (pp. 474–475), 2016 (pp. 112–113).

=== Sweden ===
- Men's national team: Sweden
- Team appearances: 8 (1908–1924, 1936–1952, 1980)
- As host team: 1912^{*}
- Last updated: 1 April 2021.

Legend

- – Hosts

Year	Cap No.	Goalkeeper	Birth	Age	ISHOF member	Note	Ref
1908 }} (bronze)		Torsten Kumfeldt	1886	22		The only goalkeeper in the squad	
1912 }} (silver)		Torsten Kumfeldt (2)	1886	26		The only goalkeeper in the squad	
1920 }} (bronze)		Torsten Kumfeldt (3)	1886	34			
1920 }} (bronze)		Theodor Nauman	1885	34			
1924		Theodor Nauman (2)	1885	38		Starting goalkeeper	
1924		(Unknown)					
1936		Åke Nauman	1908	28		Starting goalkeeper	
1936		(Unknown)					
1948		Folke Eriksson	1925	23			
1948		Rune Öberg	1922	25			
1952		Rune Källqvist	1929	22		Starting goalkeeper	
1952		(Unknown)					
1980	1	Anders Flodqvist	1959	20		Starting goalkeeper	
1980		(Unknown)					
Year	Cap No.	Goalkeeper	Birth	Age	ISHOF member	Note	Ref

=== Switzerland ===
- Men's national team: Switzerland
- Team appearances: 5 (1920–1928, 1936–1948)
- As host team: —

=== Ukraine ===
- Men's national team: Ukraine
- Team appearances: 1 (1996)
- As host team: —
- Related teams: Soviet Union^{†}, Unified Team^{†}
- Last updated: 1 April 2021.

Abbreviation

- Eff % – Save efficiency (Saves / Shots)

Year	Cap No.	Goalkeeper	Birth	Age	Saves	Shots	Eff %	ISHOF member	Note	Ref
1996	1	Oleksiy Yehorov	1964	31	52	119	43.7%		Starting goalkeeper	
1996	4	Oleh Volodymyrov	1967	28	6	15	40.0%			

- Official Reports (PDF): 1996 (pp. 62–66, 70–72).

=== Unified Team ===
- Men's national team: (International Olympic Committee) Unified Team^{†}
- Team appearances: 1 (1992)
- As host team: —
- Related teams: Soviet Union^{†}, Kazakhstan, Russia, Ukraine
- Last updated: 1 April 2021.

Year	Cap No.	Goalkeeper	Birth	Age	ISHOF member	Note	Ref
1992 (bronze)	1	Yevgeny Sharonov (3)	1958	33	2003		
1992 (bronze)	13	Alexander Tchigir	1968	23			

Notes:

- Yevgeny Sharonov is also listed in section Soviet Union.
- Alexander Tchigir is also listed in section Germany.

=== United States ===
- Men's national team: United States
- Team appearances: 22 (1920–1972, 1984^{*}–2020)
- As host team: 1932^{*}, 1984^{*}, 1996^{*}
- Last updated: 27 July 2021.

Legend and abbreviation

- – Hosts
- Eff % – Save efficiency (Saves / Shots)

Year	Cap No.	Goalkeeper	Birth	Age	ISHOF member	Note	Ref
1920		Sophus Jensen	1889	31			
1920		Preston Steiger	1898	21			
1924 (bronze)		Fred Lauer	1898	25		Starting goalkeeper	
1924 (bronze)		(Unknown)					
1928		Harry Daniels	1900	28		Starting goalkeeper	
1928		(Unknown)					
1932 (bronze)		Herbert Wildman	1912	19		Starting goalkeeper	
1932 (bronze)		(Unknown)					
1936		Fred Lauer (2)	1898	37			
1936		Herbert Wildman (2)	1912	23			
1948		Ralph Budelman	1918	30		Starting goalkeeper	
1948		(Unknown)					
1952		Harry Bisbey	1931	21		Starting goalkeeper	
1952		(Unknown)					
1956		Kenneth Hahn	1928	28			
1956		Robert Horn	1931	25			
1960		Gordie Hall	1935	24			
1960		Robert Horn (2)	1931	28			
1964	1	Tony van Dorp	1936	28			
1964	11	George Stransky	1944	20			
1968	1	Tony van Dorp (2)	1936	32			
1968	11	Steven Barnett	1943	25			
1972 (bronze)	1	James Slatton	1947	25			
1972 (bronze)	9	Steven Barnett (2)	1943	29			
1984 (silver)	1	Craig Wilson	1957	27	2005	Starting goalkeeper	
1984 (silver)	13	Christopher Dorst	1956	28			
1988 (silver)	1	Craig Wilson (2)	1957	31	2005	Starting goalkeeper	
1988 (silver)	12	Christopher Duplanty	1965	22			
1992	1	Craig Wilson (3)	1957	35	2005	Starting goalkeeper	
1992	3	Christopher Duplanty (2)	1965	26			
Year	Cap No.	Goalkeeper	Birth	Age	ISHOF member	Note	Ref

Year	Cap No.	Goalkeeper	Birth	Age	Saves	Shots	Eff %	ISHOF member	Note	Ref
1996	1	Christopher Duplanty (3)	1965	30	77	132	58.3%		Starting goalkeeper	
1996	2	Dan Hackett	1970	25	1	3	33.3%			
2000	1	Dan Hackett (2)	1970	30	70	135	51.9%		Starting goalkeeper	
2000	12	Sean Nolan	1972	28	2	5	40.0%			
2004	1	Brandon Brooks	1981	23	58	108	53.7%		Starting goalkeeper	
2004	12	Genai Kerr	1976	27	0	0	—			
2008 (silver)	1	Merrill Moses	1977	31	70	117	59.8%		Starting goalkeeper	
2008 (silver)	13	Brandon Brooks (2)	1981	27	4	7	57.1%			
2012	1	Merrill Moses (2)	1977	34	72	135	53.3%		Starting goalkeeper	
2012	13	Chay Lapin	1987	25	8	15	53.3%			
2016	1	Merrill Moses (3)	1977	39	30	52	57.7%			
2016	13	McQuin Baron	1995	20	19	32	59.4%			
2020	1	Alex Wolf	1997	24						
2020	13	Drew Holland	1995	26						
Year	Cap No.	Goalkeeper	Birth	Age	Saves	Shots	Eff %	ISHOF member	Note	Ref

Sources:

- Official Reports (PDF): 1996 (pp. 62–66, 70–72);
- Official Results Books (PDF): 2000 (pp. 47, 51, 53, 80, 82, 85, 89–90), 2004 (pp. 231–232), 2008 (pp. 214–215), 2012 (pp. 497–498), 2016 (pp. 133–134).

=== United Team of Germany ===
- Men's national team: United Team of Germany^{†}
- Team appearances: 3 (1956–1964)
- As host team: —
- Related teams: Germany, East Germany^{†}, West Germany^{†}
- Last updated: 1 April 2021.

Year	Cap No.	Goalkeeper	Birth	Age	ISHOF member	Note	Ref
1956		Emil Bildstein (2)	1931	25			
1956		Karl Neuse	1930	25			
1960		Emil Bildstein (3)	1931	29			
1960		Hans Hoffmeister	1936	24			
1964		Heinz Mäder	1937	27			
1964		Peter Schmidt	1937	26			

Notes:

- Emil Bildstein is also listed in section Germany.
- Hans Hoffmeister is also listed in section West Germany.
- Peter Schmidt is also listed in section East Germany.

=== Uruguay ===
- Men's national team: Uruguay
- Team appearances: 2 (1936–1948)
- As host team: —

=== West Germany ===
- Men's national team: West Germany^{†}
- Team appearances: 5 (1968–1976, 1984–1988)
- As host team: 1972^{*}
- Related teams: Germany, United Team of Germany^{†}
- Last updated: 1 April 2021.

Legend

- – Hosts

Year	Cap No.	Goalkeeper	Birth	Age	ISHOF member	Note	Ref
1968	1	Hans Hoffmeister (2)	1936	32			
1968	11	Günter Kilian	1950	18			
1972	1	Gerd Olbert	1948	24			
1972	11	Hans Hoffmeister (3)	1936	36			
1976	1	Günter Kilian (2)	1950	26			
1976	11	Peter Röhle	1957	19			
1984 (bronze)	1	Peter Röhle (2)	1957	27			
1984 (bronze)	12	Santiago Chalmovsky	1959	25			
1988	1	Peter Röhle (3)	1957	31			
1988	7	Ingo Borgmann	1965	23			

Notes:

- Ingo Borgmann is also listed in section Germany.
- Hans Hoffmeister is also listed in section United Team of Germany.
- Peter Röhle is also listed in section Germany.

=== Yugoslavia ===
- Men's national team: Yugoslavia^{†}
- Team appearances: 12 (1936–1988)
- As host team: —
- Related teams: Croatia, FR Yugoslavia^{†}, Serbia and Montenegro^{†}, Montenegro, Serbia
- Last updated: 23 May 2021.

Year	Cap No.	Goalkeeper	Birth	Age	ISHOF member	Note	Ref
1936		Miro Mihovilović	1915	21		Starting goalkeeper	
1936		(Unknown)					
1948		Zdravko-Ćiro Kovačić	1925	23	1984		
1948		Juraj Amšel	1924	23			
1952 }} (silver)		Zdravko-Ćiro Kovačić (2)	1925	27	1984	Starting goalkeeper	
1952 }} (silver)		Juraj Amšel (2)	1924	27			
1956 }} (silver)		Zdravko-Ćiro Kovačić (3)	1925	31	1984	Flag bearer for Yugoslavia; Starting goalkeeper	
1956 }} (silver)		Juraj Amšel (3)	1924	31			
1960		Milan Muškatirović	1934	26		Starting goalkeeper	
1960		(Unknown)					
1964 }} (silver)	1	Milan Muškatirović (2)	1934	30			
1964 }} (silver)	11	Karlo Stipanić	1941	22			
1968 (gold)	1	Karlo Stipanić (2)	1941	26			
1968 (gold)	11	Zdravko Hebel	1943	25			
1972	1	Karlo Stipanić (3)	1941	30			
1972	11	Miloš Marković	1947	25			
1976	1	Miloš Marković (2)	1947	29			
1976	11	Zoran Kačić	1953	22			
1980 }} (silver)	1	Luka Vezilić	1948	32			
1980 }} (silver)	11	Milorad Krivokapić	1956	24			
1984 (gold)	1	Milorad Krivokapić (2)	1956	28			
1984 (gold)	13	Andrija Popović	1959	24			
1988 (gold)	1	Aleksandar Šoštar	1964	24	2011		
1988 (gold)	13	Renco Posinković	1964	24			
Year	Cap No.	Goalkeeper	Birth	Age	ISHOF member	Note	Ref

Note:

- Aleksandar Šoštar is also listed in section FR Yugoslavia.

=== FR Yugoslavia ===
- Men's national team: Yugoslavia^{†}
- Team appearances: 2 (1996–2000)
- As host team: —
- Related teams: Yugoslavia^{†}, Serbia and Montenegro^{†}, Montenegro, Serbia
- Last updated: 1 April 2021.

Abbreviation

- Eff % – Save efficiency (Saves / Shots)

Year	Cap No.	Goalkeeper	Birth	Age	Saves	Shots	Eff %	ISHOF member	Note	Ref
1996	1	Aleksandar Šoštar (2)	1964	32	59	128	46.1%	2011	Starting goalkeeper	
1996	13	Milan Tadić	1970	26	2	11	18.2%			
2000 (bronze)	1	Aleksandar Šoštar (3)	1964	36	49	85	57.6%	2011	Starting goalkeeper	
2000 (bronze)	12	Nikola Kuljača	1974	26	6	6	100.0%			

Sources:

- Official Reports (PDF): 1996 (pp. 57–61, 70–72);
- Official Results Books (PDF): 2000 (pp. 46, 50, 56, 78, 83, 85, 88, 92).

Notes:

- Nikola Kuljača is also listed in section Serbia and Montenegro.
- Aleksandar Šoštar is also listed in section Yugoslavia.

== See also ==
- Water polo at the Summer Olympics
- Lists of Olympic water polo records and statistics
  - List of men's Olympic water polo tournament records and statistics
  - List of women's Olympic water polo tournament records and statistics
  - List of Olympic champions in men's water polo
  - List of Olympic champions in women's water polo
  - National team appearances in the men's Olympic water polo tournament
  - National team appearances in the women's Olympic water polo tournament
  - List of players who have appeared in multiple men's Olympic water polo tournaments
  - List of players who have appeared in multiple women's Olympic water polo tournaments
  - List of Olympic medalists in water polo (men)
  - List of Olympic medalists in water polo (women)
  - List of men's Olympic water polo tournament top goalscorers
  - List of women's Olympic water polo tournament top goalscorers
  - List of women's Olympic water polo tournament goalkeepers
  - List of Olympic venues in water polo

== Sources ==
=== Official Reports (IOC) ===
PDF documents in the LA84 Foundation Digital Library:

- Official Report of the 1896 Olympic Games (download, archive)
- Official Report of the 1900 Olympic Games (download, archive)
- Official Report of the 1904 Olympic Games (download, archive)
- Official Report of the 1908 Olympic Games (download, archive) (pp. 359–361)
- Official Report of the 1912 Olympic Games (download, archive) (pp. 1021–1024, 1031–1037)
- Official Report of the 1920 Olympic Games (download, archive) (p. 130)
- Official Report of the 1924 Olympic Games (download, archive) (pp. 439–440, 486–494)
- Official Report of the 1928 Olympic Games (download, archive) (pp. 746–757, 797–807)
- Official Report of the 1932 Olympic Games (download, archive) (pp. 619–623, 646–652)
- Official Report of the 1936 Olympic Games, v.2 (download, archive) (pp. 345–356)
- Official Report of the 1948 Olympic Games (download, archive) (pp. 537–540, 640–647)
- Official Report of the 1952 Olympic Games (download, archive) (pp. 600–608)
- Official Report of the 1956 Olympic Games (download, archive) (pp. 592–594, 624–627)
- Official Report of the 1960 Olympic Games (download, archive) (pp. 552–555, 617–634)
- Official Report of the 1964 Olympic Games, v.2 (download, archive) (pp. 682–698)
- Official Report of the 1968 Olympic Games, v.3 (download, archive) (pp. 449–466, 811–826)
- Official Report of the 1972 Olympic Games, v.3 (download, archive) (pp. 331, 353–365)
- Official Report of the 1976 Olympic Games, v.3 (download, archive) (pp. 446–447, 484–497)
- Official Report of the 1980 Olympic Games, v.3 (download, archive) (pp. 458, 495–510)
- Official Report of the 1984 Olympic Games, v.2 (download, archive) (pp. 528–534)
- Official Report of the 1988 Olympic Games, v.2 (download, archive) (pp. 590–598)
- Official Report of the 1992 Olympic Games, v.5 (download, archive) (pp. 354, 386–400)
- Official Report of the 1996 Olympic Games, v.3 (download, archive) (pp. 56–73)

=== Official Results Books (IOC) ===
PDF documents in the LA84 Foundation Digital Library:

- Official Results Book – 2000 Olympic Games – Water Polo (download, archive)
- Official Results Book – 2004 Olympic Games – Water Polo (download, archive)
- Official Results Book – 2008 Olympic Games – Water Polo (download, archive)

PDF documents on the FINA website:

- Official Results Book – 2012 Olympic Games – Diving, Swimming, Synchronised Swimming, Water Polo (archive) (pp. 284–507)

PDF documents in the Olympic World Library:

- Official Results Book – 2016 Olympic Games – Water Polo (archive)

PDF documents on the International Olympic Committee website:

- Official Results Book – 2020 Olympic Games – Water Polo (archive)
- Official Results Book – 2024 Olympic Games – Water Polo

=== Official Reports (FINA) ===
PDF documents on the FINA website:

- HistoFINA – Water polo medalists and statistics (as of September 2019) (archive) (pp. 4–13)
- 1870–2020 | 150 years of Water Polo – Evolution of its rules (archive)

=== Official website (IOC) ===
Water polo on the International Olympic Committee website:

- Water polo
- Men's water polo

=== Olympedia ===
Water polo on the Olympedia website:

- Water polo Archived 2021-12-28 at the Wayback Machine
- Men's water polo
- Athlete count for water polo
- Water polo venues
- Water polo at the 1900 Summer Olympics (men's tournament)
- Water polo at the 1904 Summer Olympics (men's tournament)
- Water polo at the 1908 Summer Olympics (men's tournament)
- Water polo at the 1912 Summer Olympics (men's tournament)
- Water polo at the 1920 Summer Olympics (men's tournament)
- Water polo at the 1924 Summer Olympics (men's tournament)
- Water polo at the 1928 Summer Olympics (men's tournament)
- Water polo at the 1932 Summer Olympics (men's tournament)
- Water polo at the 1936 Summer Olympics (men's tournament)
- Water polo at the 1948 Summer Olympics (men's tournament)
- Water polo at the 1952 Summer Olympics (men's tournament)
- Water polo at the 1956 Summer Olympics (men's tournament)
- Water polo at the 1960 Summer Olympics (men's tournament)
- Water polo at the 1964 Summer Olympics (men's tournament)
- Water polo at the 1968 Summer Olympics (men's tournament)
- Water polo at the 1972 Summer Olympics (men's tournament)
- Water polo at the 1976 Summer Olympics (men's tournament)
- Water polo at the 1980 Summer Olympics (men's tournament)
- Water polo at the 1984 Summer Olympics (men's tournament)
- Water polo at the 1988 Summer Olympics (men's tournament)
- Water polo at the 1992 Summer Olympics (men's tournament)
- Water polo at the 1996 Summer Olympics (men's tournament)
- Water polo at the 2000 Summer Olympics (men's tournament)
- Water polo at the 2004 Summer Olympics (men's tournament)
- Water polo at the 2008 Summer Olympics (men's tournament)
- Water polo at the 2012 Summer Olympics (men's tournament)
- Water polo at the 2016 Summer Olympics (men's tournament)
- Water polo at the 2020 Summer Olympics (men's tournament)

=== Sports Reference ===
Water polo on the Sports Reference website:

- Country Medal Leaders & Athlete Medal Leaders (1900–2016) (archived)
- Men's water polo (1900–2016) (archived)
- Water polo at the 1900 Summer Games (men's tournament) (archived)
- Water polo at the 1904 Summer Games (men's tournament) (archived)
- Water polo at the 1908 Summer Games (men's tournament) (archived)
- Water polo at the 1912 Summer Games (men's tournament) (archived)
- Water polo at the 1920 Summer Games (men's tournament) (archived)
- Water polo at the 1924 Summer Games (men's tournament) (archived)
- Water polo at the 1928 Summer Games (men's tournament) (archived)
- Water polo at the 1932 Summer Games (men's tournament) (archived)
- Water polo at the 1936 Summer Games (men's tournament) (archived)
- Water polo at the 1948 Summer Games (men's tournament) (archived)
- Water polo at the 1952 Summer Games (men's tournament) (archived)
- Water polo at the 1956 Summer Games (men's tournament) (archived)
- Water polo at the 1960 Summer Games (men's tournament) (archived)
- Water polo at the 1964 Summer Games (men's tournament) (archived)
- Water polo at the 1968 Summer Games (men's tournament) (archived)
- Water polo at the 1972 Summer Games (men's tournament) (archived)
- Water polo at the 1976 Summer Games (men's tournament) (archived)
- Water polo at the 1980 Summer Games (men's tournament) (archived)
- Water polo at the 1984 Summer Games (men's tournament) (archived)
- Water polo at the 1988 Summer Games (men's tournament) (archived)
- Water polo at the 1992 Summer Games (men's tournament) (archived)
- Water polo at the 1996 Summer Games (men's tournament) (archived)
- Water polo at the 2000 Summer Games (men's tournament) (archived)
- Water polo at the 2004 Summer Games (men's tournament) (archived)
- Water polo at the 2008 Summer Games (men's tournament) (archived)
- Water polo at the 2012 Summer Games (men's tournament) (archived)
- Water polo at the 2016 Summer Games (men's tournament) (archived)
- Water polo at the 2020 Summer Games (men's tournament) (archived)

=== Todor66 ===
Water polo on the Todor66 website:

- Water polo at the Summer Games
- Water polo at the 1900 Summer Olympics (men's tournament)
- Water polo at the 1904 Summer Olympics (men's tournament)
- Water polo at the 1908 Summer Olympics (men's tournament)
- Water polo at the 1912 Summer Olympics (men's tournament)
- Water polo at the 1920 Summer Olympics (men's tournament)
- Water polo at the 1924 Summer Olympics (men's tournament)
- Water polo at the 1928 Summer Olympics (men's tournament)
- Water polo at the 1932 Summer Olympics (men's tournament)
- Water polo at the 1936 Summer Olympics (men's tournament)
- Water polo at the 1948 Summer Olympics (men's tournament)
- Water polo at the 1952 Summer Olympics (men's tournament)
- Water polo at the 1956 Summer Olympics (men's tournament)
- Water polo at the 1960 Summer Olympics (men's tournament)
- Water polo at the 1964 Summer Olympics (men's tournament)
- Water polo at the 1968 Summer Olympics (men's tournament, men's qualification)
- Water polo at the 1972 Summer Olympics (men's tournament, men's qualification)
- Water polo at the 1976 Summer Olympics (men's tournament, men's European qualification)
- Water polo at the 1980 Summer Olympics (men's tournament, men's European qualification, men's world qualification)
- Water polo at the 1984 Summer Olympics (men's tournament, men's qualification)
- Water polo at the 1988 Summer Olympics (men's tournament, men's qualification)
- Water polo at the 1992 Summer Olympics (men's tournament, men's qualification)
- Water polo at the 1996 Summer Olympics (men's tournament, men's qualification)
- Water polo at the 2000 Summer Olympics (men's tournament, men's qualification)
- Water polo at the 2004 Summer Olympics (men's tournament, men's qualification)
- Water polo at the 2008 Summer Olympics (men's tournament, men's qualification)
- Water polo at the 2012 Summer Olympics (men's tournament, men's qualification)
- Water polo at the 2016 Summer Olympics (men's tournament, men's qualification)
- Water polo at the 2020 Summer Olympics (men's tournament, men's qualification)
- Water polo at the 2024 Summer Olympics (men's tournament, men's qualification)

=== ISHOF ===
International Swimming Hall of Fame (ISHOF) website:

- Honorees Listed by Category – Water Polo
- Honorees Listed by Category – Coaches
- Honorees Listed by Category – Contributors
- Honorees by Country
- Honorees By Last Name
