= Alexander Tchigir =

Water polo player

Personal information
- Born: 6 November 1968 (age 58) Moscow, Russian SFSR, Soviet Union
Medal record
Men's Water polo
Representing the Unified Team
Olympic Games
Bronze medal – third place	1992 Barcelona	Team competition

Alexander Tchigir (Aleksandr Chigir; born 6 November 1968 in Moscow) is a Russian and later German water polo player who competed in the 1992 Summer Olympics, in the 2004 Summer Olympics, and in the 2008 Summer Olympics.

== See also ==
- Soviet Union men's Olympic water polo team records and statistics
- Germany men's Olympic water polo team records and statistics
- List of Olympic medalists in water polo (men)
- List of men's Olympic water polo tournament goalkeepers
