= Oleh Volodymyrov =

Ukrainian water polo player

Personal information
- Nationality: Ukrainian
- Born: 8 December 1967 (age 57)

Sport
- Sport: Water polo

Oleh Volodymyrov (born 8 December 1967) is a Ukrainian water polo player. He competed in the men's tournament at the 1996 Summer Olympics.

== See also ==
- List of men's Olympic water polo tournament goalkeepers
