= Ottó Boros =

Hungarian water polo player

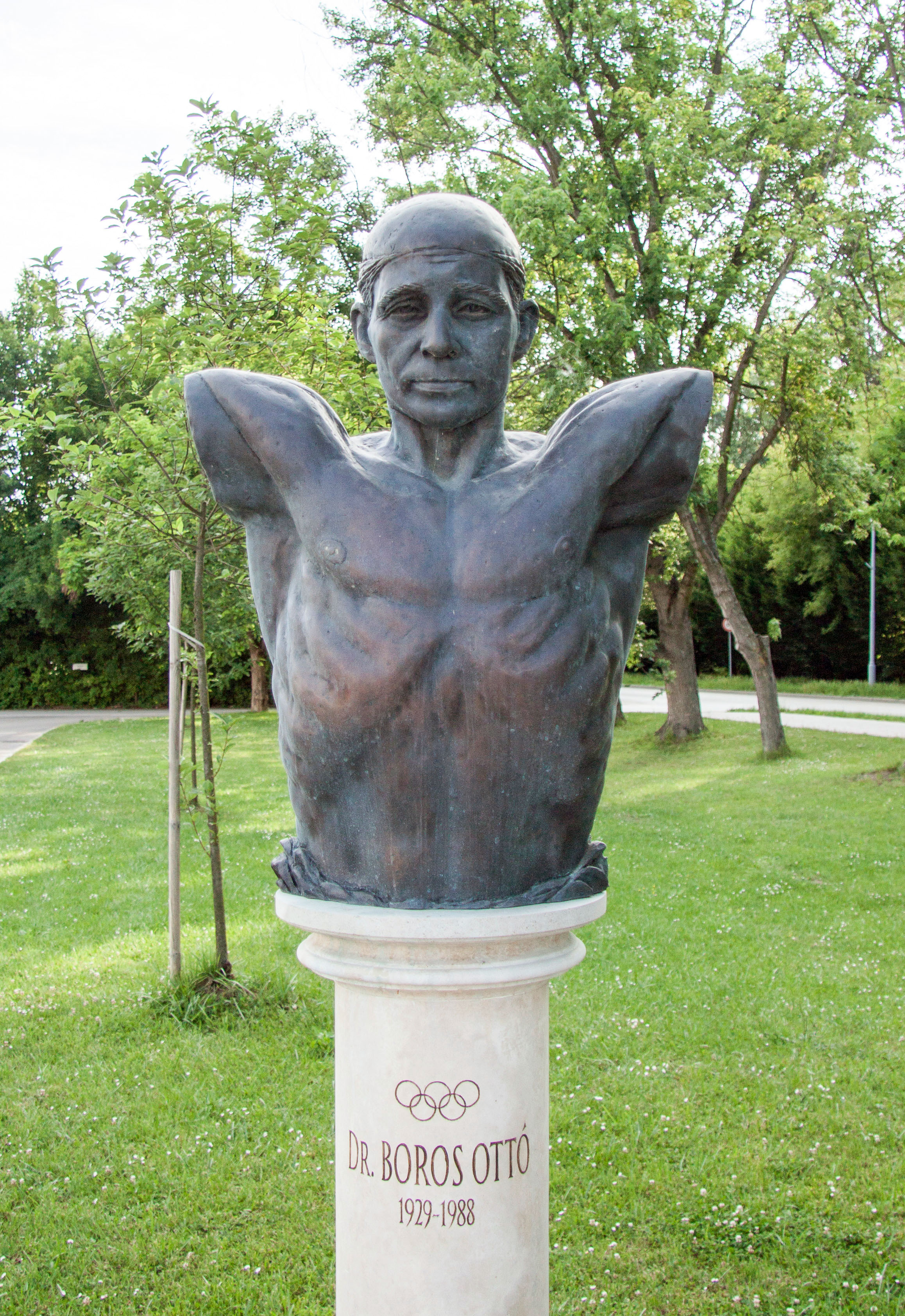

Personal information
- Born: 5 August 1929 Békéscsaba, Hungary
- Died: 18 December 1988 (aged 59) Szolnok, Hungary

Sport
- Sport: Water polo
Medal record
Representing Hungary
Olympic Games
Gold medal – first place	1956 Melbourne	Team competition
Gold medal – first place	1964 Tokyo	Team competition
Bronze medal – third place	1960 Rome	Team competition

Ottó Boros (5 August 1929 – 18 December 1988) was a Hungarian water polo player who competed in the 1956, 1960, and 1964 Summer Olympics.

Boros was part of the Hungarian team which won the gold medal in the 1956 tournament. He played four matches as goalkeeper.

Four years later he was a member of the Hungarian team which won the bronze medal in the 1960 Olympic tournament. He played five matches as goalkeeper.

At the 1964 Games he won his second gold medal with the Hungarian team. He played three matches as goalkeeper.

== See also ==
- Hungary men's Olympic water polo team records and statistics
- List of Olympic champions in men's water polo
- List of Olympic medalists in water polo (men)
- List of men's Olympic water polo tournament goalkeepers
- Blood in the Water match
