= Oleksiy Yehorov =

Ukrainian water polo player

Personal information
- Nationality: Ukrainian
- Born: 5 August 1964 (age 60)

Sport
- Sport: Water polo

Oleksiy Yehorov (born 5 August 1964) is a Ukrainian water polo player. He competed in the men's tournament at the 1996 Summer Olympics.

== See also ==
- List of men's Olympic water polo tournament goalkeepers
