= Michael Withers (water polo) =

Australian water polo player

Personal information
- Born: 1 February 1938 (age 87)

Michael Withers (born 1 February 1938) is an Australian water polo player who competed at three Olympic Games.

He competed at the 1960 Rome, 1964 Tokyo and 1972 Munich Olympics as a goalkeeper. In 2011, he was inducted into the Water Polo Australia Hall of Fame.

In 1962 he won the 110 yard breaststroke event at the Victorian state swimming championships.

== See also ==
- Australia men's Olympic water polo team records and statistics
- List of men's Olympic water polo tournament goalkeepers
