= Ma Jianjun =

Chinese water polo player

Personal information
- Nationality: China
- Born: October 8, 1984 (age 42) Baise, Guangxi
- Height: 195 cm (6.40 ft)
- Weight: 185 kg (408 lb)

Sport
- Sport: Water polo

Ma Jianjun (born 8 October 1984 in Baise, Guangxi) is a male Chinese water polo player who was part of the gold medal winning team at the 2007 National Championships. He competed at the 2008 Summer Olympics.

== See also ==
- List of men's Olympic water polo tournament goalkeepers
