= Siniša Školneković =

Croatian water polo player

Personal information
- Born: 18 January 1968 (age 58) Varaždin, Yugoslavia
- Height: 194 cm (6 ft 4 in)
- Weight: 89 kg (196 lb)

Sport
- Sport: Water polo
Medal record
Representing Croatia
Olympic Games
| Silver medal – second place | 1996 Atlanta | Team competition |
European Championships
| Silver medal – second place | 1999 Florence | Team competition |

Siniša Školneković (born 18 January 1968) is a former Croatian water polo player and coach. He represented Croatia at the 1996 Summer Olympics in Atlanta and the 2000 Summer Olympics in Sydney.

== See also ==
- Croatia men's Olympic water polo team records and statistics
- List of Olympic medalists in water polo (men)
- List of men's Olympic water polo tournament goalkeepers
