= Emil Bildstein =

German water polo player (1931–2021)

Personal information
- Nationality: German
- Born: 17 May 1931; Munich, Germany
- Died: 23 January 2021 (aged 89)

Sport
- Sport: Water polo

Emil Bildstein (17 May 1931 – 23 January 2021) was a German water polo player. He competed at the 1952 Summer Olympics, the 1956 Summer Olympics and the 1960 Summer Olympics.

== See also ==
- Germany men's Olympic water polo team records and statistics
- List of men's Olympic water polo tournament goalkeepers
