= Oscar Periche =

Cuban water polo player (born 1949)

Personal information
- Born: 31 October 1949 (age 75); Oriente, Cuba

Sport
- Sport: Water polo

Oscar Periche (born 31 October 1949) is a Cuban water polo player. He competed at the 1968, 1972, 1976 and the 1980 Summer Olympics.

== See also ==
- List of players who have appeared in multiple men's Olympic water polo tournaments
- List of men's Olympic water polo tournament goalkeepers
