= Peter Schmidt (water polo) =

German water polo player

Personal information
- Nationality: German
- Born: 1 December 1937 (age 87); Eisenberg, Germany

Sport
- Sport: Water polo

Peter Schmidt (born 1 December 1937) is a German former water polo player. He competed at the 1964 Summer Olympics and the 1968 Summer Olympics.

== See also ==
- Germany men's Olympic water polo team records and statistics
- List of men's Olympic water polo tournament goalkeepers
