= István Barta =

Hungarian water polo player

Personal information
- Born: August 13, 1895 Almosd, Austria-Hungary
- Died: February 16, 1948 (aged 52) Budapest, Hungary

Sport
- Sport: Water polo
Medal record
Representing Hungary
Olympic Games
Gold medal – first place	1932 Los Angeles	Team competition
Silver medal – second place	1928 Amsterdam	Team competition

István Barta (13 August 1895 – 16 February 1948) was a Hungarian water polo player who competed in the 1924 Summer Olympics, in the 1928 Summer Olympics, and in the 1932 Summer Olympics.

Barta, who was Jewish, was born in Álmosd. He first competed at the Olympics in 1924. As a member of the Hungarian water polo team he finished fifth. He played all four matches as goalkeeper. On club level he played for Újpesti TE

He was part of the Hungarian water polo team which won the silver medal in 1928 and the gold medal in 1932. In Amsterdam at the 1928 Summer Olympics he played all four matches as goalkeeper. Four years later in Los Angeles he played one match as goalkeeper. He died in Budapest.

== Personal life ==
Istvan had a daughter Julia who emigrated to Canada and became a pediatrician in Montreal. Istvan had a brother, Miklos Barta, who was murdered by the Nazis, Istvan had 2 nephews and a niece through his brother Miklos. The Oldest Giz Folden née Barta born in Budapest in 1926 lives in Australia. Giz was married to Imre Folden who died in 1984, together they had 2 sons, Tom and Peter Folden, Both played water polo in Australia at a very competitive level. Tom Folden has 2 sons Shanon and Gavin, intern Shanon Folden has 3 sons and Gavin a son and daughter.

Miklos had a son, Robert Barta who was married to Marta Pinter (a representative of the Hungarian National Swimming Team) had 4 children. The two eldest, Rayner and Yvette both played water polo in Australia. Rayner, like his great uncle was also a goalkeeper and represented Australia at the 11th Maccabiah Games in Israel. Miklos also had another son Osi who died in Vienna in 1967 he had 2 children.

== See also ==
- Hungary men's Olympic water polo team records and statistics
- List of Olympic champions in men's water polo
- List of Olympic medalists in water polo (men)
- List of men's Olympic water polo tournament goalkeepers
- List of select Jewish water polo players
