= Hans Hoffmeister (water polo) =

German water polo player

Personal information
- Nationality: German
- Born: 3 February 1936; Chemnitz, Germany
- Died: 26 September 2016 (aged 80)

Sport
- Sport: Water polo

Hans Hoffmeister (3 February 1936 – 26 September 2016) was a German water polo player. He competed at the 1960 Summer Olympics, the 1968 Summer Olympics and the 1972 Summer Olympics.

== See also ==
- Germany men's Olympic water polo team records and statistics
- List of men's Olympic water polo tournament goalkeepers
