= Ingo Borgmann =

German water polo player

Personal information
- Nationality: German
- Born: 17 June 1965 (age 61) Hamm, West Germany

Sport
- Sport: Water polo

Ingo Borgmann (born 17 June 1965) is a German former water polo player. He competed at the 1988 Summer Olympics, the 1992 Summer Olympics and the 1996 Summer Olympics.

== See also ==
- Germany men's Olympic water polo team records and statistics
- List of men's Olympic water polo tournament goalkeepers
