= Günter Kilian =

German water polo player (1950–2026)

Personal information
- Nationality: German
- Born: 29 January 1950 Würzburg, Bavaria, West Germany
- Died: 27 January 2026 (aged 75)

Sport
- Sport: Water polo
Medal record
Representing West Germany
World Championships
Bronze medal – third place	1982 Guayaquil	Team competition
European Championships
Gold medal – first place	1981 Split	Team competition

Günter Kilian (29 January 1950 – 27 January 2026) was a German water polo player. He competed at the 1968 Summer Olympics and the 1976 Summer Olympics. His twin brother Horst was also a water polo player.

Kilian died on 27 January 2026, aged 75.

== See also ==
- Germany men's Olympic water polo team records and statistics
- List of men's Olympic water polo tournament goalkeepers
- List of World Aquatics Championships medalists in water polo
