= Aucamp v Morton =

South African legal case

Aucamp v Morton is an important case in South African contract law. It was heard in the Appellate Division by Watermeyer CJ, Centlivres JA, Schreiner JA, Van den Heever JA and Fagan AJA on 7 and 8 June 1949, with judgment on 21 June.

== Facts ==
In the case of a contract involving reciprocal obligations, a breach by one party of one of his obligations will usually only give the other a right to treat the contract as discharged if the breach is one which evinces an intention on the part of the defaulter no longer to be bound by the terms of the contract for the future, or if the defaulter has broken a promise, the fulfilment of which is essential to the continuation of the contractual tie.

In May 1947, Morton purchased a forest and agreed to be bound by a contract between the then-owner Aucamp, whereby the latter had acquired the right, on certain conditions, to fell and remove timber from the forest. In July, Morton directed his agent "G," in charge of felling operations, to discontinue them. After a discussion of the terms of the contract with Aucamp, Morton then cancelled the contract and refused to allow Aucamp access to the forest. Aucamp thereupon instituted an action claiming an order restraining Morton from interfering with his rights under the contract and for damages.

In his plea, Morton set up the defence

- that Aucamp had broken the contract; and
- that he, Morton, had therefore been justified in denying him access to the forest.

In his claim in reconvention, Morton asked

- for an order cancelling the contract; and
- for damages.

A Local Division found in favour of Morton and granted an order cancelling the contract, relying on a breach by Aucamp in that he had failed to remove all sound and merchantable timber, of that felled by him, complying with the measurements mentioned in a clause of the contract.

== Judgment ==
In Aucamp's appeal, the Appellate Division held, on the facts, inter alia,

- that the amount of timber which had been left to rot did not amount to a large quantity;
- that it did no harm to the forest;
- that the contract specified no time limit within which felled timber had to be removed;
- that Morton himself had attached little importance to this breach;
- that it was not due to any deliberate act on the part of the appellant but to neglect on the part of one of his servants; and
- that it was very easily remediable.

Neither this breach, accordingly, nor another relating to payment which the trial court had found proved, were sufficient to justify the respondent in regarding the contractual relationship between himself and the appellant as thereby terminated. An order was therefore granted restraining the respondent from preventing Aucamp from lawfully exercising his rights under the agreement.

As to Aucamp's claim for damages, the court held that the correct basis for calculation of them would not be the hypothesis that he had entirely lost the profit which he would have made out of particular contracts which he had lost; it was that his making of profits from cutting and selling timber had been deferred for about 22 months owing to his operations in the forest having been stopped. As Aucap had failed to prove the facts necessary for the court to make a calculation of damages on this basis, it was ruled that there should be judgment of absolution from the instance on this prayer.

The decision of the Eastern District Local Division, in Morton v Aucamp, was thereby reversed.
