= William Aucamp =

South African water polo player

Personal information
- Nationality: South African
- Born: 16 February 1932; Johannesburg, South Africa
- Died: 22 March 1992 (aged 60); Johannesburg, South Africa

Sport
- Sport: Water polo

William Andrew John Aucamp (16 February 1932 – 22 March 1992) was a South African water polo player. He competed at the 1952 Summer Olympics and the 1960 Summer Olympics.

== See also ==
- List of men's Olympic water polo tournament goalkeepers
