= Horst Kilian =

German water polo player

Personal information
- Nationality: German
- Born: 29 January 1950 (age 76) Würzburg, West Germany

Sport
- Sport: Water polo

Horst Kilian (born 29 January 1950) is a German water polo player. He competed in the men's tournament at the 1976 Summer Olympics.

His twin brother Günter (died 2026) was also a water polo player.
