= Cillian Twomey =

Retired geriatric medical consultant

- Education: University College Cork

Cillian Twomey is a retired Irish geriatric medical consultant.

Twomey was president of the Irish Medical Organisation for 1989–1990, and former chairman of its Consultant Committee. He was president of the European Union of Medical Specialists (UEMS) from 1999 to 2002, the first Irish person to hold this position. He was a member of the steering group of the 2003 National Task Force on Medical Staffing (Hanly) that reviewed the organisation and staffing of Ireland's acute hospital sector.

Served as president of the Irish Gerontology Society from 2003 to 2007. In October 2006, he was invited to deliver the Annual Trevor Howell Guest Lecture at the autumn scientific meeting of the British Geriatrics Society in Harrogate.
