= Noel Purcell (sportsman) =

Water polo player (1891–1962)

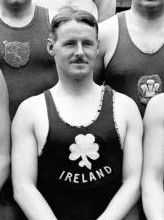
- Born: Noel Mary Joseph Purcell; 15 November 1891 Dublin, Ireland
- Died: 31 January 1962 (aged 70) Dún Laoghaire, Ireland
- School: Belvedere College; Clongowes Wood College
- University: Trinity College, Dublin
- Occupation: Solicitor

Rugby union career
- Position: No. 8/No. 9
Senior career
Years	Team	Apps	(Points)
1912–1914	Dublin University		
- Lansdowne
- Barbarians
Provincial / State sides
Years	Team	Apps	(Points)
	Leinster	8	
International career
Years	Team	Apps	(Points)
1921	Ireland	4	
Refereeing career
Years	Competition		Apps
1927	Five Nations		

Noel Mary Joseph Purcell (15 November 1891 – 31 January 1962) was an Irish water polo player who represented both Great Britain and Ireland at the 1920 and 1924 Summer Olympics respectively. He was also an Ireland rugby union international and rugby union referee. He was the first Olympic athlete to represent two different nations. He is also the only Ireland rugby union international to ever win an Olympic Gold medal. In 2012 his collection of medals and international caps were donated to Belvedere College by his daughter Rosemary and son Noel.

== Early life ==
Purcell was born in Dublin. He was the son of Daniel Purcell, a solicitor who was originally from Limerick, and Mary Clara Hoey who was from Dublin. He had two older siblings, a brother and a sister. In 1911 the Purcell family were living in Leeson Street. Purcell was educated at Belvedere College, Clongowes Wood College and Trinity College, Dublin. During the First World War, he served as a second lieutenant and then as a captain with the Leinster Regiment. He was injured while serving on the Western Front.

== Water polo player ==
Noel Purcell
Playing information
Club
Years	Team	Pld	T	G	FG	P
191x–192x	Dublin University S.C.
192x–192x	Dublin S.C.
	Total	0	0	0	0	0
Representative
Years	Team	Pld	T	G	FG	P
191x–192x	Leinster
1910–1932	Ireland
1920	Great Britain

=== Clubs and province ===
Purcell was a member of both Dublin University Swimming Club and the Dublin Swimming Club. As a swimmer he won four Irish Amateur Swimming Association championship titles between 1911 and 1920. In 1911 and 1912, he won the titles over 880 yards, in 1919 he won the 220 yards gold medal and in 1920 he was champion over 440 yards. In 1913 and 1921, as a water polo player, he won two Leinster Senior Cups with Dublin University. He also helped Dublin University win an All Ireland title in 1920. In a 1921 Leinster Senior League game against Pembroke, Purcell scored all four goals for Dublin University in a 4–2 win. Purcell also represented Leinster at provincial level.

=== Great Britain ===
Olympic medal record

Men's Water Polo
Gold medal – first place	1920 Antwerp	Team competition

At the 1920 Summer Olympics, Purcell was a member of the Great Britain team that won the gold medal. It was originally intended that Great Britain would be represented by the England national team. However, in a final trial game, England were beaten 6–0 by a Rest of Great Britain team featuring Purcell. This subsequently saw Purcell included in the Olympic squad. Although representing Great Britain, pictures from the Olympics, show Purcell wearing a swimming costume with a shamrock and the word "Ireland" on it. In the Olympic final, Great Britain beat Belgium 3–2 to win the gold medal. Other members of the team included Charles Sydney Smith, Paul Radmilovic, Charles Bugbee, Christopher Jones, William Peacock and William Henry Dean.

=== Ireland ===
Purcell played for Ireland from 1910 to 1932. At the 1924 Summer Olympics he captained the Ireland team. Having previously represented Great Britain in 1920, Purcell now became the first Olympic athlete to represent two different nations. In the quarter-final against Czechoslovakia, Purcell scored twice as Ireland lost 4–2. Purcell was also selected to represent Ireland at the 1928 Summer Olympics. However, he declined because of his business commitments as a solicitor. He also wanted to give younger players the opportunity to play at an Olympics. Purcell also represented Ireland at the Tailteann Games.

== Rugby union career ==
=== Clubs and province ===
Purcell played club rugby union for both Dublin University and Lansdowne. He was club captain at Lansdowne for the 1919–20 and 1920–21 seasons. He also represented Leinster at provincial level and toured with the Barbarians.

=== Ireland ===
In the 1921 Five Nations Championship, Purcell played in all four games for Ireland. He made his debut against England on 12 February at Twickenham. He then played against Scotland on 26 February and Wales on 12 March. He made his final appearance for Ireland against France on 9 April at the Stade Colombes.

=== Referee and Selector ===
Purcell refereed the 1927 Five Nations Championship match between England and Scotland. As a referee, he was not as fast around the field as he had been as a player. A match report in The Times noted "NM Purcell from Ireland refereed casually and from a great distance." Between 1939 and 1941, Purcell also served as selector for Ireland.

== See also ==
- Great Britain men's Olympic water polo team records and statistics
- List of Olympic champions in men's water polo
- List of Olympic medalists in water polo (men)
