= Great Britain men's Olympic water polo team records and statistics =

This article lists various water polo records and statistics in relation to the Great Britain men's national water polo team at the Summer Olympics.

The Great Britain men's national water polo team has participated in 11 of 27 official men's water polo tournaments.

== Abbreviations ==
Apps	Appearances	Rk	Rank	Ref	Reference	Cap No.	Water polo cap number
Pos	Playing position	FP	Field player	GK	Goalkeeper	ISHOF	International Swimming Hall of Fame
L/R	Handedness	L	Left-handed	R	Right-handed	Oly debut	Olympic debut in water polo
(C)	Captain	p.	page	pp.	pages		

== Team statistics ==
=== Comprehensive results by tournament ===
Notes:

- Results of Olympic qualification tournaments are not included. Numbers refer to the final placing of each team at the respective Games.
- At the 1904 Summer Olympics, a water polo tournament was contested, but only American contestants participated. Currently the International Olympic Committee (IOC) and the International Swimming Federation (FINA) consider water polo event as part of unofficial program in 1904.
- Last updated: 5 May 2021.

Legend

- 1 – Champions
- 2 – Runners-up
- 3 – Third place
- 4 – Fourth place
- — – The nation did not participate in the Games
- Q – Qualified for forthcoming tournament
- – Hosts

Men's team	00	04	08	12	20	24	28	32	36	48	52	56	60	64	68	72	76	80	84	88	92	96	00	04	08	12	16	20	Years
Great Britain	1		1	1	1	8	4		8	13	12	7														12			11
Total teams	7		4	6	12	13	14	5	16	18	21	10	16	13	15	16	12	12	12	12	12	12	12	12	12	12	12	12	

=== Number of appearances ===
Last updated: 5 May 2021.

Legend

- Year^{*} – As host team

Men's team	Apps	Record streak	Active streak	Debut	Most recent	Best finish	Confederation
Great Britain	11	5	0	1900	2012^{*}	Champions	Europe – LEN

=== Best finishes ===
Last updated: 5 May 2021.

Legend

- Year^{*} – As host team

Men's team	Best finish	Apps	Confederation
Great Britain	Champions (1900, 1908^{*}, 1912, 1920)	11	Europe – LEN

=== Finishes in the top four ===
Last updated: 5 May 2021.

Legend

- Year^{*} – As host team

Men's team	Total	Champions	Runners-up	Third place	Fourth place	First	Last
Great Britain	5	4 (1900, 1908^{*}, 1912, 1920)			1 (1928)	1900	1928

=== Medal table ===
Last updated: 5 May 2021.

Men's team	Gold	Silver	Bronze	Total
Great Britain (GBR)	4	0	0	4

== Player statistics ==
=== Multiple appearances ===
The following table is pre-sorted by number of Olympic appearances (in descending order), year of the last Olympic appearance (in ascending order), year of the first Olympic appearance (in ascending order), date of birth (in ascending order), name of the player (in ascending order), respectively.

- Number of six-time Olympians: 0
- Number of five-time Olympians: 1
- Number of four-time Olympians: 1
- Last updated: 27 July 2021.

Legend

- – Hosts

Male athletes who competed in water polo at four or more Olympics
Apps	Player	Birth	Pos	Water polo tournaments					Age of first/last	ISHOF member	Note	Ref
Apps	Player	Birth	Pos	1	2	3	4	5	Age of first/last	ISHOF member	Note	Ref
5	Paul Radmilovic	1886	FP	1908	1912	1920	1924	1928	22/42	1967		
4	Charles Smith	1879	GK	1908	1912	1920	1924		29/45	1981	Flag bearer for Great Britain (1912)	

=== Multiple medalists ===
The following table is pre-sorted by total number of Olympic medals (in descending order), number of Olympic gold medals (in descending order), number of Olympic silver medals (in descending order), year of receiving the last Olympic medal (in ascending order), year of receiving the first Olympic medal (in ascending order), name of the player (in ascending order), respectively.

- Number of four-time Olympic medalists: 0
- Number of three-time Olympic medalists: 2
- Last updated: 1 May 2021.

Legend

- – Hosts

Male athletes who won three or more Olympic medals in water polo
Rk	Player	Birth	Height	Pos	Water polo tournaments					Period (age of first/last)	Medals				Ref
Rk	Player	Birth	Height	Pos	1	2	3	4	5	Period (age of first/last)	G	S	B	T	Ref
1	Paul Radmilovic	1886	1.80 m (5 ft 11 in)	FP	1908	1912	1920	1924	1928	20 years (22/42)	3	0	0	3	
1	Charles Smith	1879	1.86 m (6 ft 1 in)	GK	1908	1912	1920	1924		16 years (29/45)	3	0	0	3	

=== Top goalscorers ===
The following table is pre-sorted by number of total goals (in descending order), year of the last Olympic appearance (in ascending order), year of the first Olympic appearance (in ascending order), name of the player (in ascending order), respectively.

- Number of goalscorers (50+ goals): 0
- Number of goalscorers (40–49 goals): 0
- Number of goalscorers (30–39 goals): 0
- Last updated: 1 April 2021.

=== Goalkeepers ===
The following table is pre-sorted by edition of the Olympics (in ascending order), cap number or name of the goalkeeper (in ascending order), respectively.

Last updated: 1 April 2021.

Legend and abbreviation

- – Hosts
- Eff % – Save efficiency (Saves / Shots)

Year	Cap No.	Goalkeeper	Birth	Age	ISHOF member	Note	Ref
1900 (gold)		William Henry	1859	41	1974	The only goalkeeper in the squad	
1908 (gold)		Charles Smith	1879	29	1981	The only goalkeeper in the squad	
1912 (gold)		Charles Smith (2)	1879	33	1981	Flag bearer for Great Britain; The only goalkeeper in the squad	
1920 (gold)		Charles Smith (3)	1879	41	1981	The only goalkeeper in the squad	
1924		Charles Smith (4)	1879	45	1981	Starting goalkeeper	
1924		(Unknown)					
1928		Leslie Ablett	1904	24			
1928		William Quick	1902	26			
1936		Leslie Ablett (2)	1904	32			
1936		Alfred North	1908	20			
1948		Ian Johnson	1930	17–18		Starting goalkeeper	
1948		(Unknown)					
1952		Ian Johnson (2)	1930	21–22		Starting goalkeeper	
1952		(Unknown)					
1956		Arthur Grady	1922	34		Starting goalkeeper	
1956		(Unknown)					
Year	Cap No.	Goalkeeper	Birth	Age	ISHOF member	Note	Ref

Year	Cap No.	Goalkeeper	Birth	Age	Saves	Shots	Eff %	ISHOF member	Note	Ref
2012	1	Edward Scott	1988	24	18	52	34.6%			
2012	13	Matthew Holland	1989	23	29	72	40.3%			

- Official Results Books (PDF): 2012 (pp. 476–477).

=== Top sprinters ===
The following table is pre-sorted by number of total sprints won (in descending order), year of the last Olympic appearance (in ascending order), year of the first Olympic appearance (in ascending order), name of the sprinter (in ascending order), respectively.

* Number of sprinters (30+ sprints won, since 2000): 0

- Number of sprinters (20–29 sprints won, since 2000): 0
- Number of sprinters (10–19 sprints won, since 2000): 0
- Number of sprinters (5–9 sprints won, since 2000): 1
- Last updated: 15 May 2021.

Legend and abbreviation

- – Hosts
- Eff % – Efficiency (Sprints won / Sprints contested)

Male players with 5 or more sprints won at the Olympics (statistics since 2000)
Rk	Sprinter	Birth	Total sprints won	Total sprints contested	Eff %	Water polo tournaments (sprints won / contested)					Age of first/last	ISHOF member	Note	Ref
Rk	Sprinter	Birth	Total sprints won	Total sprints contested	Eff %	1	2	3	4	5	Age of first/last	ISHOF member	Note	Ref
1	Sean King	1989	5	9	55.6%	2012 (5/9)					23/23			

- Official Results Books (PDF): 2012 (pp. 476–477).

== Olympic champions ==
=== 1900 Summer Olympics ===
- Edition of men's tournament: 1st
- Host city: Paris, France
- Number of participating teams: 7 teams from 4 countries, including 4 from France (Note: France had four teams compete in 1900. Bronze medals were given to the losers of both semifinals; France took both bronze.)
- Competition format: Single-elimination tournament
- Champion: Osborne Swimming Club (Great Britain, 1st title)

Match	Round	Date	Opponent	Result	Goals for	Goals against	Goal diff.
Match 1/3	Round one	11 August 1900	Tritons Lillois (France)	Won	12	0	12
Match 2/3	Semi-finals	12 August 1900	Pupilles de Neptune de Lille #2 (France)	Won	10	1	9
Match 3/3	Gold medal match	12 August 1900	Brussels Swimming and Water Polo Club (Belgium)	Won	7	2	5
Total	Matches played: 3 • Wins: 3 • Ties: 0 • Defeats: 0 • Win %: 100%				29	3	26

Sources:

- Olympedia: 1900 (men's tournament);
- Sports Reference: 1900 (men's tournament).
- Head coach: (United Kingdom)

Roster
#	Player	Pos	Height	Weight	Date of birth	Age of winning gold	Oly debut	ISHOF member
P1	Thomas Coe (C)	FP			3 November 1873	26 years, 282 days	Yes	
P2	Robert Crawshaw	FP			6 March 1869	31 years, 159 days	Yes	
P3	William Henry	GK			28 June 1859	41 years, 45 days	Yes	1974
P4	John Jarvis	FP			24 February 1872	28 years, 169 days	Yes	1968
P5	Peter Kemp	FP			1878	21 years, 224 days – 22 years, 223 days	Yes	
P6	Victor Lindberg	FP			26 July 1875	25 years, 17 days	Yes	
P7	Frederick Stapleton	FP			11 March 1877	23 years, 154 days	Yes	
Average					15 March 1872 – 6 May 1872	28 years, 98 days – 28 years, 150 days		

Sources:

- Olympedia: 1900 (men's tournament);
- Sports Reference: 1900 (men's tournament);
- ISHOF.

=== 1908 Summer Olympics ===
- Edition of men's tournament: 3rd
- Host city: London, United Kingdom
- Number of participating teams: 4
- Competition format: Single-elimination tournament
- Champion: Great Britain (2nd title)

Match	Round	Date	Opponent	Result	Goals for	Goals against	Goal diff.
Match 1/3	Round one	15 July 1908	Bye (Note: Having drawn a bye in the first round and having received a walkover against Austria in the semi-final, the final was the only match that Great Britain played during the tournament.)				
Match 2/3	Semi-finals	20 July 1908	Austria	Austria withdrew before the tournament started.			
Match 3/3	Gold medal match	22 July 1908	Belgium	Won	9	2	7
Total	Matches played: 1 • Wins: 1 • Ties: 0 • Defeats: 0 • Win %: 100%				9	2	7

Source: Official Reports (PDF): 1908 (pp. 360, 361).

- Head coach: (United Kingdom)

Roster
#	Player	Pos	Height	Weight	Date of birth	Age of winning gold	Oly debut	ISHOF member
P1	George Cornet	FP	1.91 m (6 ft 3 in)	98 kg (216 lb)	15 July 1877	31 years, 7 days	Yes	
P2	Charles Forsyth	FP	1.79 m (5 ft 10 in)	76 kg (168 lb)	10 January 1885	23 years, 194 days	Yes	
P3	George Nevinson	FP	1.74 m (5 ft 9 in)		3 October 1882	25 years, 293 days	Yes	
P4	Paul Radmilovic	FP	1.80 m (5 ft 11 in)	76 kg (168 lb)	5 March 1886	22 years, 139 days	Yes	1967
P5	Charles Smith (C)	GK	1.86 m (6 ft 1 in)	105 kg (231 lb)	26 January 1879	29 years, 178 days	Yes	1981
P6	Thomas Thould	FP	1.78 m (5 ft 10 in)	73 kg (161 lb)	11 January 1886	22 years, 193 days	Yes	
P7	George Wilkinson	FP	1.73 m (5 ft 8 in)	80 kg (176 lb)	3 March 1879	29 years, 141 days	Yes	1980
Average			1.80 m (5 ft 11 in)		2 April 1882	26 years, 111 days		

Sources:

- Official Reports (PDF): 1908 (pp. 360, 361);
- Olympedia: 1908 (men's tournament);
- Sports Reference: 1908 (men's tournament);
- ISHOF.

=== 1912 Summer Olympics ===
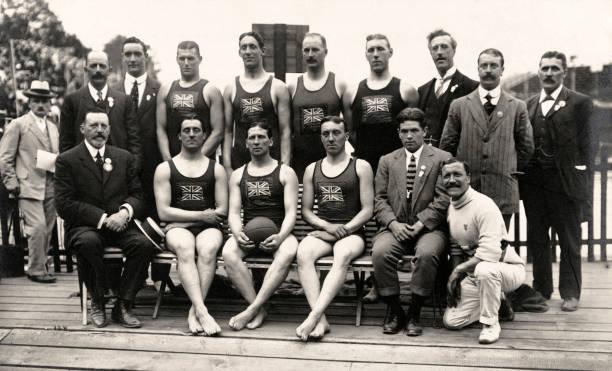
The 1912 Great Britain men's Olympic water polo team.

- Edition of men's tournament: 4th
- Host city: Stockholm, Sweden
- Number of participating teams: 6
- Competition format: Single-elimination tournament
- Champion: Great Britain (3rd title)

Match	Round	Date	Opponent	Result	Goals for	Goals against	Goal diff.
Match 1/3	Round one	7 July 1912	Belgium	Won	7	5	2
Match 2/3	Semi-finals	11 July 1912	Sweden	Won	6	3	3
Match 3/3	Gold medal match	13 July 1912	Austria	Won	8	0	8
Total	Matches played: 3 • Wins: 3 • Ties: 0 • Defeats: 0 • Win %: 100%				21	8	13

Source: Official Reports (PDF): 1912 (pp. 1022, 1024, 1033).

- Head coach: (United Kingdom)

Roster
#	Player	Pos	Height	Weight	Date of birth	Age of winning gold	Oly debut	ISHOF member
P1	Isaac Bentham	FP			27 October 1886	25 years, 263 days	Yes	
P2	Charles Bugbee	FP	1.91 m (6 ft 3 in)		29 August 1887	24 years, 322 days	Yes	
P3	George Cornet	FP	1.91 m (6 ft 3 in)	98 kg (216 lb)	15 July 1877	35 years, 1 day	No	
P4	Arthur Hill	FP			9 January 1888	24 years, 189 days	Yes	
P5	Paul Radmilovic	FP	1.80 m (5 ft 11 in)	76 kg (168 lb)	5 March 1886	26 years, 133 days	No	1967
P6	Charles Smith	GK	1.86 m (6 ft 1 in)	105 kg (231 lb)	26 January 1879	33 years, 172 days	No	1981
P7	George Wilkinson (C)	FP	1.73 m (5 ft 8 in)	80 kg (176 lb)	3 March 1879	33 years, 135 days	No	1980
Average					30 June 1883	29 years, 16 days		

Sources:

- Official Reports (PDF): 1912 (pp. 1022, 1024, 1033);
- Olympedia: 1912 (men's tournament);
- Sports Reference: 1912 (men's tournament);
- ISHOF.

=== 1920 Summer Olympics ===
- Edition of men's tournament: 5th
- Host city: Antwerp, Belgium
- Number of participating teams: 12
- Competition format: Single-elimination tournament; Bergvall system for second- and third-place
- Champion: Great Britain (4th title)

Match	Round	Date	Opponent	Result	Goals for	Goals against	Goal diff.
Match 1/3	Round one	24 August 1920	Spain	Won	9	0	9
Match 2/3	Semi-finals	26 August 1920	United States	Won	7	2	5
Match 3/3	Gold medal match	27 August 1920	Belgium	Won	3	2	1
Total	Matches played: 3 • Wins: 3 • Ties: 0 • Defeats: 0 • Win %: 100%				19	4	15

Source: Official Reports (PDF): 1920 (p. 130).

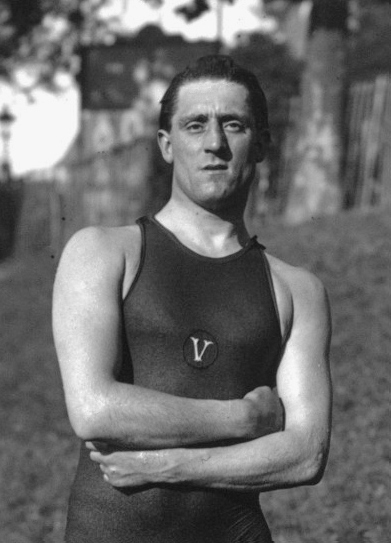
Paul Radmilovic won three gold medals in water polo at the 1908, 1912 and 1920 Olympics.

- Head coach: (United Kingdom)

Roster
#	Player	Pos	Height	Weight	Date of birth	Age of winning gold	Oly debut	ISHOF member
P1	Charles Bugbee	FP	1.91 m (6 ft 3 in)		29 August 1887	33 years, 0 days	No	
P2	William Dean	FP			6 February 1887	33 years, 205 days	Yes	
P3	Christopher Jones	FP			23 June 1884	36 years, 67 days	Yes	
P4	William Peacock	FP			6 December 1891	28 years, 267 days	Yes	
P5	Noel Purcell	FP			15 November 1891	28 years, 288 days	Yes	
P6	Paul Radmilovic (C)	FP	1.80 m (5 ft 11 in)	76 kg (168 lb)	5 March 1886	34 years, 177 days	No	1967
P7	Charles Smith	GK	1.86 m (6 ft 1 in)	105 kg (231 lb)	26 January 1879	41 years, 216 days	No	1981
Average					24 November 1886	33 years, 279 days		

Sources:

- Official Reports (PDF): 1920 (p. 130);
- Olympedia: 1920 (men's tournament);
- Sports Reference: 1920 (men's tournament);
- ISHOF.

== Water polo people at the opening and closing ceremonies ==
=== Flag bearers ===
Some sportspeople were chosen to carry the national flag of their country at the opening and closing ceremonies of the Olympic Games. As of the 2020 Summer Olympics, two male water polo players were given the honour to carry the flag for Great Britain.

Charles Smith, representing Great Britain, was the first water polo player to be a flag bearer at the opening and closing ceremonies of the Olympics.

Legend

- 2008 O – Opening ceremony of the 2008 Summer Olympics
- 2012 C – Closing ceremony of the 2012 Summer Olympics
- – Hosts
- Flag bearer^{‡} – Flag bearer who won the tournament with his team

Water polo people who were flag bearers at the opening and closing ceremonies of the Olympic Games
#	Year	Country	Flag bearer	Birth	Age	Height	Team	Pos	Water polo tournaments					Period (age of first/last)	Medals				Ref
#	Year	Country	Flag bearer	Birth	Age	Height	Team	Pos	1	2	3	4	5	Period (age of first/last)	G	S	B	T	Ref
1	1912 O	Great Britain	Charles Smith^{‡}	1879	33	1.86 m (6 ft 1 in)	Great Britain	GK	1908	1912	1920	1924		16 years (29/45)	3	0	0	3	
2	1924 O	Great Britain	Arthur Hunt	1886	37		Great Britain	FP	1924					0 years (37/37)	0	0	0	0	

== See also ==
- List of men's Olympic water polo tournament records and statistics
- Lists of Olympic water polo records and statistics
- Great Britain at the Olympics

== Sources ==
=== Official Reports (IOC) ===
PDF documents in the LA84 Foundation Digital Library:

- Official Report of the 1896 Olympic Games (download, archive)
- Official Report of the 1900 Olympic Games (download, archive)
- Official Report of the 1904 Olympic Games (download, archive)
- Official Report of the 1908 Olympic Games (download, archive) (pp. 359–361)
- Official Report of the 1912 Olympic Games (download, archive) (pp. 1021–1024, 1031–1037)
- Official Report of the 1920 Olympic Games (download, archive) (p. 130)
- Official Report of the 1924 Olympic Games (download, archive) (pp. 439–440, 486–494)
- Official Report of the 1928 Olympic Games (download, archive) (pp. 746–757, 797–807)
- Official Report of the 1932 Olympic Games (download, archive) (pp. 619–623, 646–652)
- Official Report of the 1936 Olympic Games, v.2 (download, archive) (pp. 345–356)
- Official Report of the 1948 Olympic Games (download, archive) (pp. 537–540, 640–647)
- Official Report of the 1952 Olympic Games (download, archive) (pp. 600–608)
- Official Report of the 1956 Olympic Games (download, archive) (pp. 592–594, 624–627)
- Official Report of the 1960 Olympic Games (download, archive) (pp. 552–555, 617–634)
- Official Report of the 1964 Olympic Games, v.2 (download, archive) (pp. 682–698)
- Official Report of the 1968 Olympic Games, v.3 (download, archive) (pp. 449–466, 811–826)
- Official Report of the 1972 Olympic Games, v.3 (download, archive) (pp. 331, 353–365)
- Official Report of the 1976 Olympic Games, v.3 (download, archive) (pp. 446–447, 484–497)
- Official Report of the 1980 Olympic Games, v.3 (download, archive) (pp. 458, 495–510)
- Official Report of the 1984 Olympic Games, v.2 (download, archive) (pp. 528–534)
- Official Report of the 1988 Olympic Games, v.2 (download, archive) (pp. 590–598)
- Official Report of the 1992 Olympic Games, v.5 (download, archive) (pp. 354, 386–400)
- Official Report of the 1996 Olympic Games, v.3 (download, archive) (pp. 56–73)

=== Official Results Books (IOC) ===
PDF documents in the LA84 Foundation Digital Library:

- Official Results Book – 2000 Olympic Games – Water Polo (download, archive)
- Official Results Book – 2004 Olympic Games – Water Polo (download, archive)
- Official Results Book – 2008 Olympic Games – Water Polo (download, archive)

PDF documents on the FINA website:

- Official Results Book – 2012 Olympic Games – Diving, Swimming, Synchronised Swimming, Water Polo (archive) (pp. 284–507)

PDF documents in the Olympic World Library:

- Official Results Book – 2016 Olympic Games – Water Polo (archive)

PDF documents on the International Olympic Committee website:

- Official Results Book – 2020 Olympic Games – Water Polo (archive)
- Official Results Book – 2024 Olympic Games – Water Polo

=== Official Reports (FINA) ===
PDF documents on the FINA website:

- HistoFINA – Water polo medalists and statistics (as of September 2019) (archive) (pp. 4–13)
- 1870–2020 | 150 years of Water Polo – Evolution of its rules (archive)

=== Official website (IOC) ===
Water polo on the International Olympic Committee website:

- Water polo
- Men's water polo

=== Olympedia ===
Water polo on the Olympedia website:

- Water polo Archived 2021-12-28 at the Wayback Machine
- Men's water polo
- Athlete count for water polo
- Water polo venues
- Water polo at the 1900 Summer Olympics (men's tournament)
- Water polo at the 1904 Summer Olympics (men's tournament)
- Water polo at the 1908 Summer Olympics (men's tournament)
- Water polo at the 1912 Summer Olympics (men's tournament)
- Water polo at the 1920 Summer Olympics (men's tournament)
- Water polo at the 1924 Summer Olympics (men's tournament)
- Water polo at the 1928 Summer Olympics (men's tournament)
- Water polo at the 1932 Summer Olympics (men's tournament)
- Water polo at the 1936 Summer Olympics (men's tournament)
- Water polo at the 1948 Summer Olympics (men's tournament)
- Water polo at the 1952 Summer Olympics (men's tournament)
- Water polo at the 1956 Summer Olympics (men's tournament)
- Water polo at the 1960 Summer Olympics (men's tournament)
- Water polo at the 1964 Summer Olympics (men's tournament)
- Water polo at the 1968 Summer Olympics (men's tournament)
- Water polo at the 1972 Summer Olympics (men's tournament)
- Water polo at the 1976 Summer Olympics (men's tournament)
- Water polo at the 1980 Summer Olympics (men's tournament)
- Water polo at the 1984 Summer Olympics (men's tournament)
- Water polo at the 1988 Summer Olympics (men's tournament)
- Water polo at the 1992 Summer Olympics (men's tournament)
- Water polo at the 1996 Summer Olympics (men's tournament)
- Water polo at the 2000 Summer Olympics (men's tournament)
- Water polo at the 2004 Summer Olympics (men's tournament)
- Water polo at the 2008 Summer Olympics (men's tournament)
- Water polo at the 2012 Summer Olympics (men's tournament)
- Water polo at the 2016 Summer Olympics (men's tournament)
- Water polo at the 2020 Summer Olympics (men's tournament)

=== Sports Reference ===
Water polo on the Sports Reference website:

- Country Medal Leaders & Athlete Medal Leaders (1900–2016) (archived)
- Men's water polo (1900–2016) (archived)
- Water polo at the 1900 Summer Games (men's tournament) (archived)
- Water polo at the 1904 Summer Games (men's tournament) (archived)
- Water polo at the 1908 Summer Games (men's tournament) (archived)
- Water polo at the 1912 Summer Games (men's tournament) (archived)
- Water polo at the 1920 Summer Games (men's tournament) (archived)
- Water polo at the 1924 Summer Games (men's tournament) (archived)
- Water polo at the 1928 Summer Games (men's tournament) (archived)
- Water polo at the 1932 Summer Games (men's tournament) (archived)
- Water polo at the 1936 Summer Games (men's tournament) (archived)
- Water polo at the 1948 Summer Games (men's tournament) (archived)
- Water polo at the 1952 Summer Games (men's tournament) (archived)
- Water polo at the 1956 Summer Games (men's tournament) (archived)
- Water polo at the 1960 Summer Games (men's tournament) (archived)
- Water polo at the 1964 Summer Games (men's tournament) (archived)
- Water polo at the 1968 Summer Games (men's tournament) (archived)
- Water polo at the 1972 Summer Games (men's tournament) (archived)
- Water polo at the 1976 Summer Games (men's tournament) (archived)
- Water polo at the 1980 Summer Games (men's tournament) (archived)
- Water polo at the 1984 Summer Games (men's tournament) (archived)
- Water polo at the 1988 Summer Games (men's tournament) (archived)
- Water polo at the 1992 Summer Games (men's tournament) (archived)
- Water polo at the 1996 Summer Games (men's tournament) (archived)
- Water polo at the 2000 Summer Games (men's tournament) (archived)
- Water polo at the 2004 Summer Games (men's tournament) (archived)
- Water polo at the 2008 Summer Games (men's tournament) (archived)
- Water polo at the 2012 Summer Games (men's tournament) (archived)
- Water polo at the 2016 Summer Games (men's tournament) (archived)
- Water polo at the 2020 Summer Games (men's tournament) (archived)

=== Todor66 ===
Water polo on the Todor66 website:

- Water polo at the Summer Games
- Water polo at the 1900 Summer Olympics (men's tournament)
- Water polo at the 1904 Summer Olympics (men's tournament)
- Water polo at the 1908 Summer Olympics (men's tournament)
- Water polo at the 1912 Summer Olympics (men's tournament)
- Water polo at the 1920 Summer Olympics (men's tournament)
- Water polo at the 1924 Summer Olympics (men's tournament)
- Water polo at the 1928 Summer Olympics (men's tournament)
- Water polo at the 1932 Summer Olympics (men's tournament)
- Water polo at the 1936 Summer Olympics (men's tournament)
- Water polo at the 1948 Summer Olympics (men's tournament)
- Water polo at the 1952 Summer Olympics (men's tournament)
- Water polo at the 1956 Summer Olympics (men's tournament)
- Water polo at the 1960 Summer Olympics (men's tournament)
- Water polo at the 1964 Summer Olympics (men's tournament)
- Water polo at the 1968 Summer Olympics (men's tournament, men's qualification)
- Water polo at the 1972 Summer Olympics (men's tournament, men's qualification)
- Water polo at the 1976 Summer Olympics (men's tournament, men's European qualification)
- Water polo at the 1980 Summer Olympics (men's tournament, men's European qualification, men's world qualification)
- Water polo at the 1984 Summer Olympics (men's tournament, men's qualification)
- Water polo at the 1988 Summer Olympics (men's tournament, men's qualification)
- Water polo at the 1992 Summer Olympics (men's tournament, men's qualification)
- Water polo at the 1996 Summer Olympics (men's tournament, men's qualification)
- Water polo at the 2000 Summer Olympics (men's tournament, men's qualification)
- Water polo at the 2004 Summer Olympics (men's tournament, men's qualification)
- Water polo at the 2008 Summer Olympics (men's tournament, men's qualification)
- Water polo at the 2012 Summer Olympics (men's tournament, men's qualification)
- Water polo at the 2016 Summer Olympics (men's tournament, men's qualification)
- Water polo at the 2020 Summer Olympics (men's tournament, men's qualification)
- Water polo at the 2024 Summer Olympics (men's tournament, men's qualification)

=== ISHOF ===
International Swimming Hall of Fame (ISHOF) website:

- Honorees Listed by Category – Water Polo
- Honorees Listed by Category – Coaches
- Honorees Listed by Category – Contributors
- Honorees by Country
- Honorees By Last Name
