= List of flag bearers for Great Britain at the Olympics =

Great Britain at the Olympics
- Flag of the United Kingdom
- IOC code: GBR
- NOC: British Olympic Association
- Medals: Gold 310 Silver 345 Bronze 360 Total 1,015

Summer appearances
- 1896; 1900; 1904; 1908; 1912; 1920; 1924; 1928; 1932; 1936; 1948; 1952; 1956; 1960; 1964; 1968; 1972; 1976; 1980; 1984; 1988; 1992; 1996; 2000; 2004; 2008; 2012; 2016; 2020; 2024

Winter appearances
- 1924; 1928; 1932; 1936; 1948; 1952; 1956; 1960; 1964; 1968; 1972; 1976; 1980; 1984; 1988; 1992; 1994; 1998; 2002; 2006; 2010; 2014; 2018; 2022; 2026

Other related appearances
- 1906 Intercalated Games

This is a list of flag bearers who have represented Great Britain at the Olympics. Flag bearers carried the national flag of their country at the Parade of Nations of the Summer and Winter Olympic Games. Men and women from across the country and from a variety of sports have been chosen to bear their national flag at the opening ceremony. Two people have been given the honour on more than one occasion.

== Firsts ==
=== First flag bearer ===
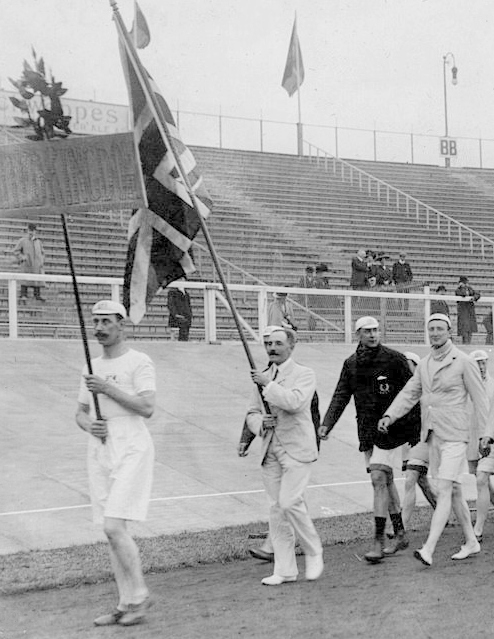
Kynaston Studd carrying the flag at the 1908 Summer Olympics in London.

The 1906 Intercalated Games is no longer considered by the International Olympic Committee (IOC) to be part of the Summer Olympic Games but it was the first such event to feature an opening ceremony with a parade of nations. William Grenfell, 1st Baron Desborough, a member of the British fencing team who went on to be president of the British Olympic Council in time for the 1908 Games in London, was the first person to carry the flag for Great Britain.

With the 1908 London Games being the first true Summer Olympics to feature a parade of nations, cricketer Kynaston Studd can be said to be the first person to carry the flag for Britain at an Olympic event. However, cricket was only played at the 1900 Olympic Games (see: Cricket at the 1900 Summer Olympics) and Studd was therefore not a competitor. Charles Sydney Smith won a 1908 gold medal in water polo and was chosen to represent the country as the flag bearer at the 1912 Summer Olympics in Stockholm, Sweden. This made him the first competing athlete to carry the flag for Great Britain.

=== First female flag bearer ===
The first woman to carry the flag was Mollie Phillips, a figure skater, who led the ceremony at the 1932 Winter Olympics in Lake Placid, New York. This made her the first woman to lead out her national team at any Olympic Games. The 1932 British Winter Olympic team comprised only four athletes, all in figure skating and all female. Phillips was by far the senior member of the team at the age of 24 compared to Joan Dix, the second oldest, at just 13 years of age.

The first female flag bearer at a Summer Olympic event was Anita Lonsbrough at the 1960 Games in Rome. Her gold medals at the 1958 British Empire and Commonwealth Games and successes in the LEN European Aquatics Championships no doubt aided her selection.

=== Nations ===
The Great British team includes athletes from England, Wales, Scotland, and Northern Ireland. Frederick McEvoy was the first person born outside England to bear the British flag. Furthermore, as he was born in Australia, he was the first person born outside of the United Kingdom to represent the country. The first person born in Scotland to lead the team out in the ceremony was gold medal-winning boxer Richard McTaggart in 1960. Lynn Davies became the first person from Wales to carry the British flag in 1968. To date nobody from Northern Ireland has been given the honour.

=== Repeated flag bearing ===
While most flag bearers have only represented Great Britain once, rowing gold-medallist Steve Redgrave was chosen for the honour in two consecutive Summer Olympic Games (1992 and 1996) and biathlete Mike Dixon carried the flag in three consecutive Winter Olympic Games (1994, 1998, and 2002). Redgrave decided not to stand for candidature during the selection process of the 2000 Summer Games.

== Selection and reactions ==
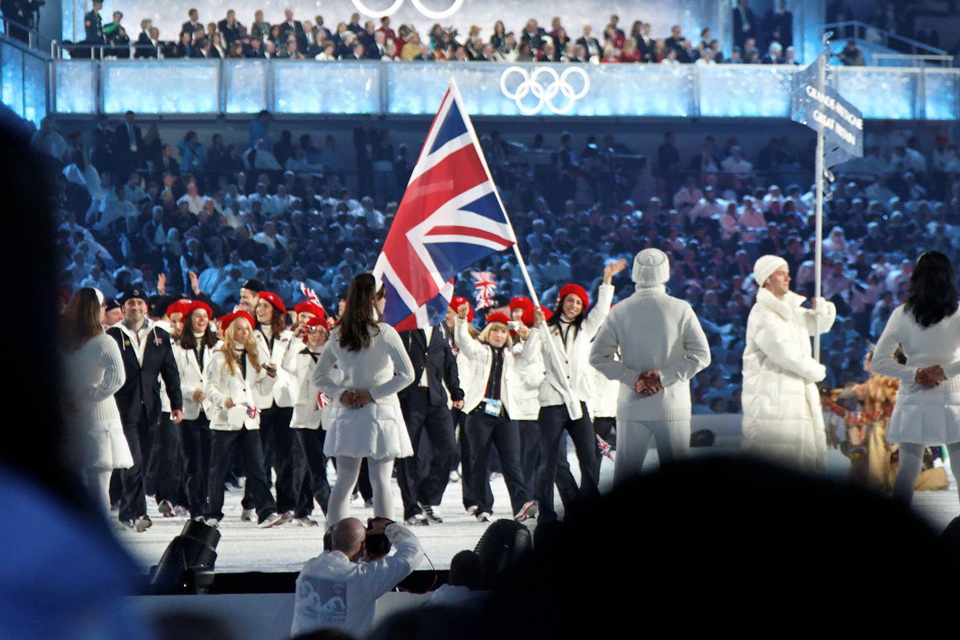
Shelley Rudman, carrying the flag at the 2010 Winter Olympics, said that her selection was a "huge honour".

The flag bearers are chosen by the British Olympic Association who sometimes open up the process to other British sporting agencies. The current process involves asking each sport involved in Team GB to nominate one of their own competitors, then to vote on the shortlist. This means that the process is open to a wider group of people and can involve the competitors themselves. The chosen flag bearer receives a certificate to commemorate their selection.

The athletes see their selection as an honour to lead the other British competitors out at the ceremony:

"I am so excited to be selected to carry the flag for Team GB. It's a huge honour for me to have been chosen to represent our team, and ultimately our country, in this way. There are some wonderful athletes here, and I will be so proud to be the person who leads them into the stadium."

— Shelley Rudman

As the parade became more firmly entrenched in tradition the pride in the role has grown. Flag bearers look back at those who previously filled the role and feel honoured to be chosen amongst them:

"It means the world, it's a real privilege, it's a real honour... It is a fantastic honour when people in the past like Matthew Pinsent, Steven Redgrave, Kate Howey, a lot of wonderful people have carried it before. I'm really, really chuffed.

— Mark Foster

The selection of a competitor can be seen as a positive reflection on the sport that they represent. When Kate Howey was chosen to bear the flag the British Judo Association noted that they were "thrilled that Kate and Judo have been given this tremendous honour".

== Boycotts ==
The 1980 Summer Olympics boycott, initiated by the United States to protest against the Soviet–Afghan War, saw many countries pull out of the Games and only 16 nations appeared at the opening ceremony. Dick Palmer, secretary to the British Olympic Association, carried the Olympic flag and marched by himself. The Soviet cameramen avoided the protesting marchers and few Soviet commentators mentioned it. Only one comment was recorded: "There is the clumsy plot that you all can see, against the traditions of the Olympic movement."

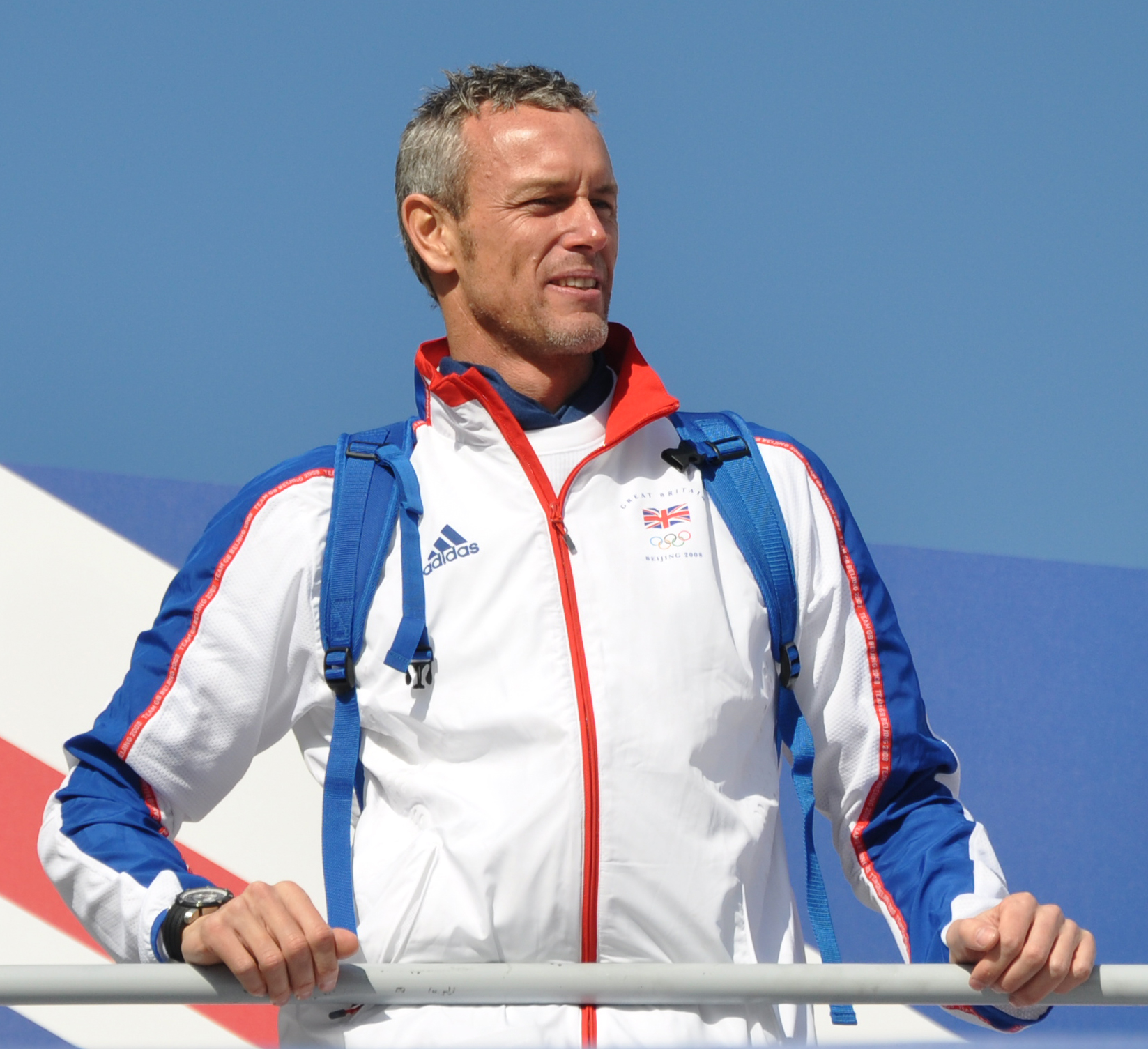
Flag bearer Mark Foster (pictured here in the celebratory parade after the Games finished) was the only swimmer allowed to take part in the 2008 opening ceremony.

While the flag bearer usually leads a large number of competitors from their country it is becoming increasingly common for athletes to stay away from the opening ceremony. The lengthy procession is said to be tiring and a distraction from important preparations. This is particularly relevant to those competing in the days immediately after the ceremony. UK Athletics, presided by 1968 flag bearer Lynn Davies, announced that none of its competitors will take part in the 2012 Summer Olympics opening ceremony in London. Head coach Charles van Commenee explained "They would not go shopping for eight hours before their biggest event so why would you be on your feet for that long?"

Other sports leaders have done the same. 2008 flag bearer Mark Foster was the only swimmer to take part in the parade while none of his colleagues were permitted to join in the celebration. They also avoided the 2012 event, preceded the year before by a statement setting the expectation:

"History shows that swimmers do not march in the opening ceremony... Our process will be to talk to our swimmer leadership group about all the pluses and minuses. Most of the leading swimming nations do not march. The decision has got to be based on performance and that's got to be the focus."

— Michael Scott, performance director of British Swimming

If competitors from the other early sports (rowing, cycling, basketball, volleyball, handball, badminton, and gymnastics) also shun the parade the British representation may look very small at their own Olympics. Paul Deighton, chief executive of the London 2012 Organising Committee, moved to reassure athletes and coaches, explaining that all competitors will have completed their duties before midnight and will have sufficient time to rest. The final decision will lie with the individuals and their coaching team.

== Other notes ==
- Skeleton athlete Shelley Rudman represented Great Britain at the 2010 Winter Olympics as the only medal winner from the previous Winter Olympics.
- Seven flag bearers were competitors in the Bobsleigh, the most from any individual sport.
- In the Summer Games, competitors from athletic events have led their country out to parade more than any sportspeople.

== List of flag bearers ==
List of flag bearers:

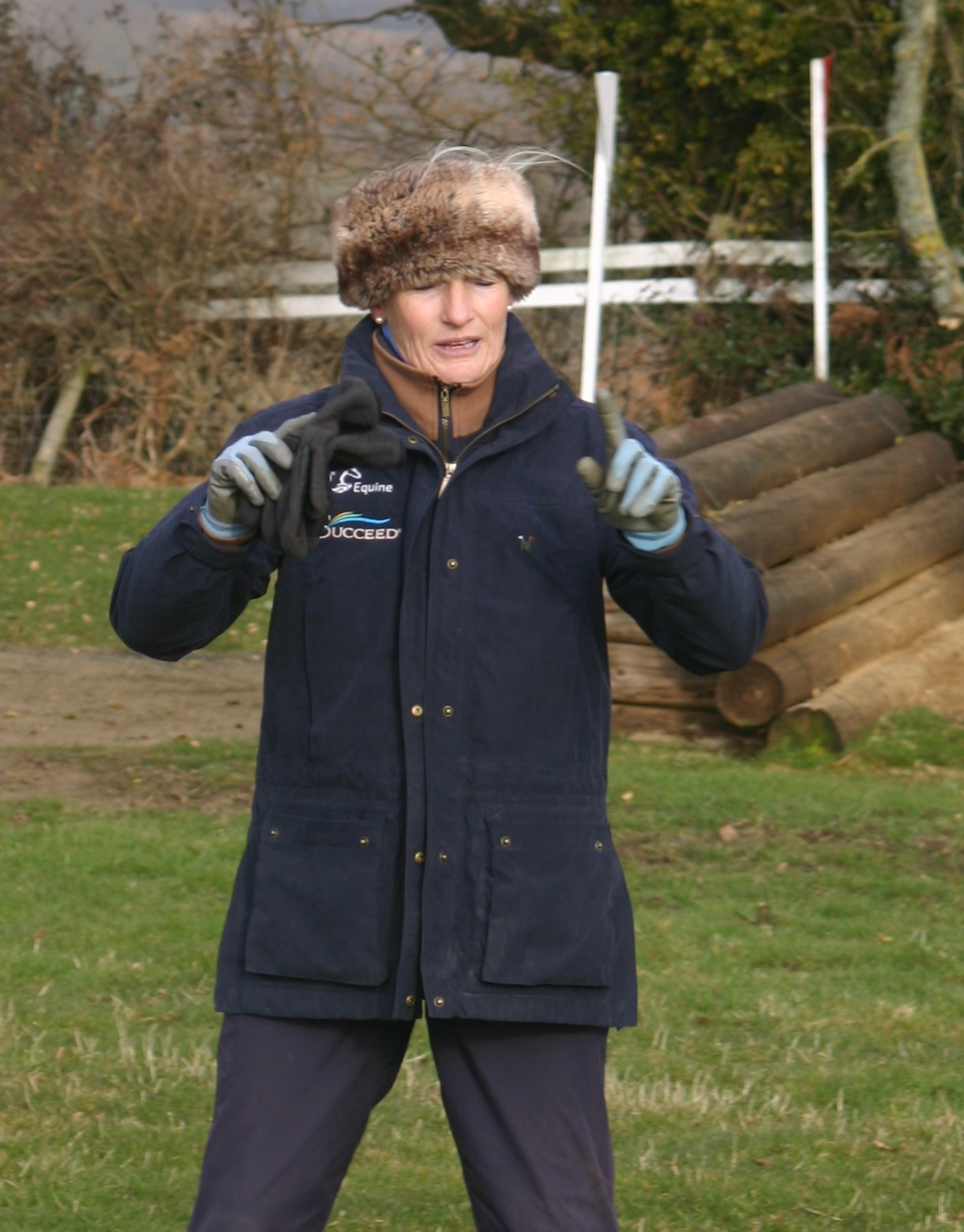
Lucinda Green, one of only three women to have carried the British flag at the Summer Olympic opening ceremony.

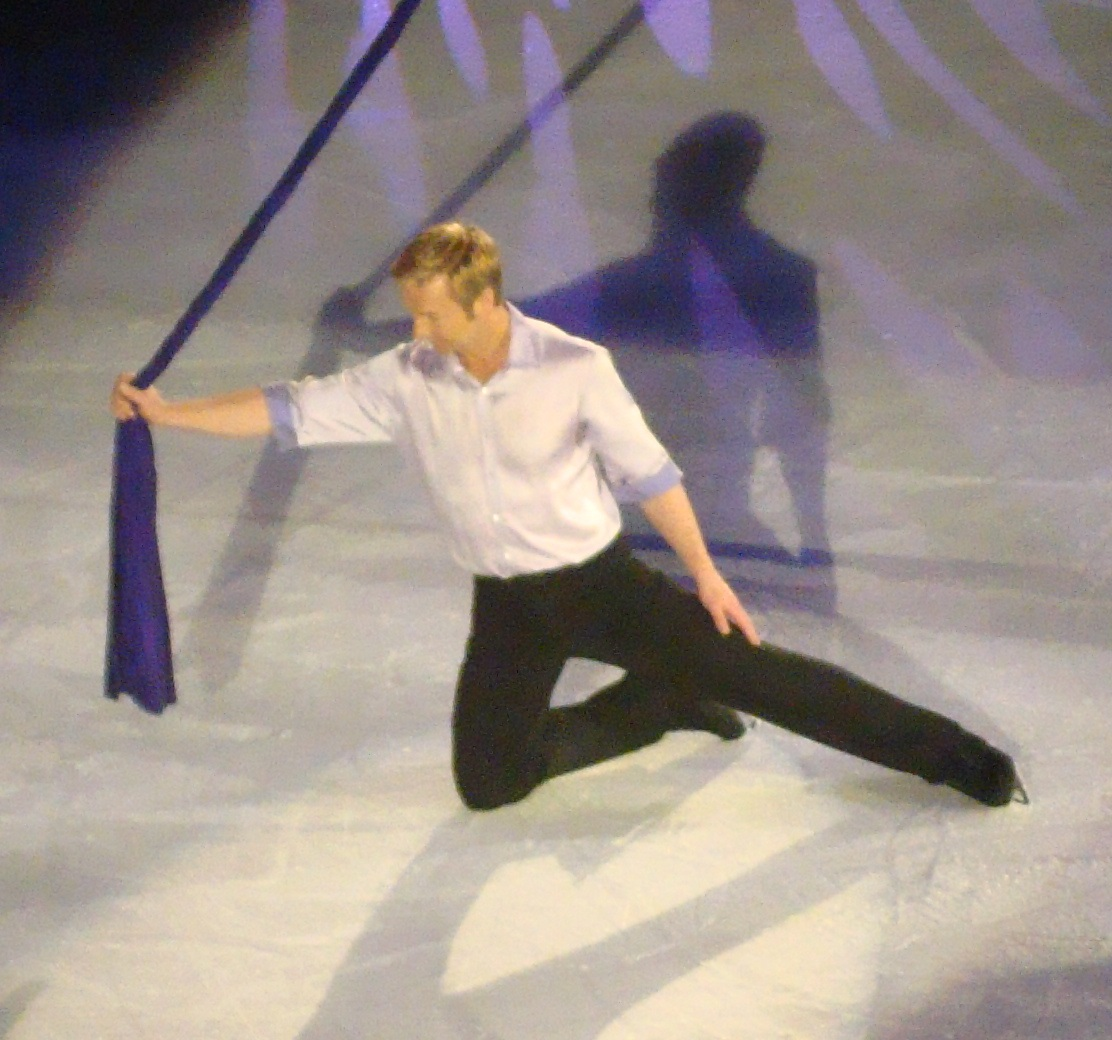
Christopher Dean, the only ice dancer to have carried the flag.

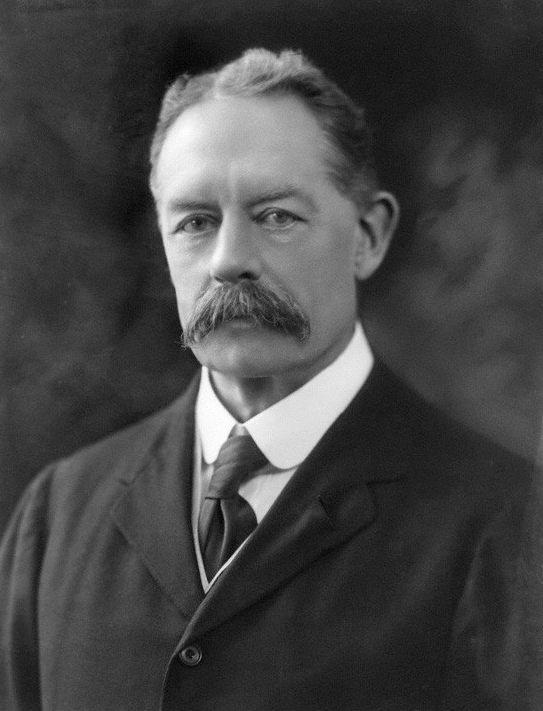
William Grenfell, 1st Baron Desborough, flag bearer at the 1906 Intercalated Games where the first parade of nations was held.

No.	Event year	Season	Ceremony	Flag bearer	Sport	Ref
1	1906	Summer	Opening	William Grenfell	Fencing	
2	1908	Summer	Opening	Kynaston Studd	Cricket	
3	1912	Summer	Opening	Charles Smith	Water polo	
4	1920	Summer	Opening	Philip Noel-Baker	Athletics	
5	1924	Summer	Opening	Arthur Hunt	Water polo	
6	1928	Summer	Opening	Malcolm Nokes	Athletics	
7	1932	Winter	Opening	Mollie Phillips	Figure skating	
8	1932	Summer	Opening	David Cecil	Athletics	
9	1936	Winter	Opening	Frederick McEvoy	Bobsleigh	
10	1936	Summer	Opening	Jack Beresford	Rowing	
11	1948	Winter	Opening	Henry Graham Sharp	Figure skating	
12	1948	Summer	Opening	John Emrys Lloyd	Fencing	
13	1952	Winter	Opening	John Nicks	Figure skating	
14	1952	Summer	Opening	Harold Whitlock	Athletics	
15	1956	Winter	Opening	Stuart Parkinson	Bobsleigh	
16	1956	Summer	Opening	George MacKenzie	Wrestling	
17	1960	Winter	Opening	John Moore	Biathlon	
18	1960	Summer	Opening	Richard McTaggart	Boxing	
19	1964	Winter	Opening	Keith Schellenberg	Bobsleigh & Luge	
20	1964	Summer	Opening	Anita Lonsbrough	Swimming	
21	1968	Winter	Opening	Robin Dixon	Bobsleigh	
22	1968	Summer	Opening	Lynn Davies	Athletics	
23	1972	Winter	Opening	Mike Freeman	Bobsleigh	
24	1972	Summer	Opening	David Broome	Equestrianism	
25	1976	Winter	Opening	John Curry	Figure skating	
26	1976	Summer	Opening	Rodney Pattisson	Sailing	
27	1980	Winter	Opening	Jeremy Palmer-Tomkinson	Alpine skiing & Luge	
28	1980	Summer	Opening	Dick Palmer	Official (See: #Boycotts)	
	1984	Winter	Opening	Christopher Dean	Ice dancing	
	1984	Winter	Closing	Gomer Lloyd	Bobsleigh	
	1984	Summer	Opening	Lucinda Green	Equestrianism	
	1984	Summer	Closing	Sebastian Coe	Athletics	
	1988	Winter	Opening	Nick Phipps	Bobsleigh	
	1988	Winter	Closing	Wilf O'Reilly	Short track speed skating	
	1988	Summer	Opening	Ian Taylor	Field hockey	
	1988	Summer	Closing	Malcolm Cooper	Shooting	
	1992	Winter	Opening	Wilf O'Reilly	Short track speed skating	
	1992	Winter	Closing	Mark Tout	Bobsleigh	
	1992	Summer	Opening	Steve Redgrave	Rowing	
	1992	Summer	Closing	Linford Christie	Athletics	
	1994	Winter	Opening	Mike Dixon	Biathlon	
	1994	Winter	Closing	Nicky Gooch	Short track speed skating	
	1996	Summer	Opening	Steve Redgrave	Rowing	
	1996	Summer	Closing	Roger Black	Athletics	
	1998	Winter	Opening	Mike Dixon	Biathlon	
	1998	Winter	Closing	Sean Olsson	Bobsleigh	
	2000	Summer	Opening	Matthew Pinsent	Rowing	
	2000	Summer	Closing	Steve Redgrave	Rowing	
	2002	Winter	Opening	Mike Dixon	Biathlon	
	2002	Winter	Closing	Rhona Martin	Curling	
	2004	Summer	Opening	Kate Howey	Judo	
	2004	Summer	Closing	Kelly Holmes	Athletics	
	2006	Winter	Opening	Rhona Martin	Curling	
	2006	Winter	Closing	Shelley Rudman	Skeleton	
	2008	Summer	Opening	Mark Foster	Swimming	
	2008	Summer	Closing	Chris Hoy	Cycling	
	2010	Winter	Opening	Shelley Rudman	Skeleton	
	2010	Winter	Closing	Amy Williams	Skeleton	
	2012	Summer	Opening	Chris Hoy	Cycling	
	2012	Summer	Closing	Ben Ainslie	Sailing	
	2014	Winter	Opening	Jon Eley	Short track speed skating	
	2014	Winter	Closing	Lizzy Yarnold	Skeleton	
	2016	Summer	Opening	Andy Murray	Tennis	
	2016	Summer	Closing	Kate Richardson-Walsh	Field Hockey	
	2018	Winter	Opening	Lizzy Yarnold	Skeleton	
	2018	Winter	Closing	Billy Morgan	Snowboarder	
	2020	Summer	Opening	Hannah Mills	Sailing	
	2020	Summer	Opening	Moe Sbihi	Rowing	
	2020	Summer	Closing	Laura Kenny	Cycling	
	2022	Winter	Opening	Eve Muirhead	Curling	
	2022	Winter	Opening	Dave Ryding	Alpine skiing	
	2022	Winter	Closing	Bruce Mouat	Curling	
	2024	Summer	Opening	Tom Daley	Diving	
	2024	Summer	Opening	Helen Glover	Rowing	
	2024	Summer	Closing	Bryony Page	Trampoline	
	2024	Summer	Closing	Alex Yee	Triathlon	
	2026	Winter	Opening	Lilah Fear	Ice dancing	
	2026	Winter	Opening	Brad Hall	Bobsleigh	
	2026	Winter	Closing	Matt Weston	Skeleton	
	2026	Winter	Closing	Charlotte Banks	Snowboard Cross	

== See also ==
- Great Britain at the Olympics
