= Mollie Phillips =

British figure skater (1907–1994)

Mollie Phillips OBE
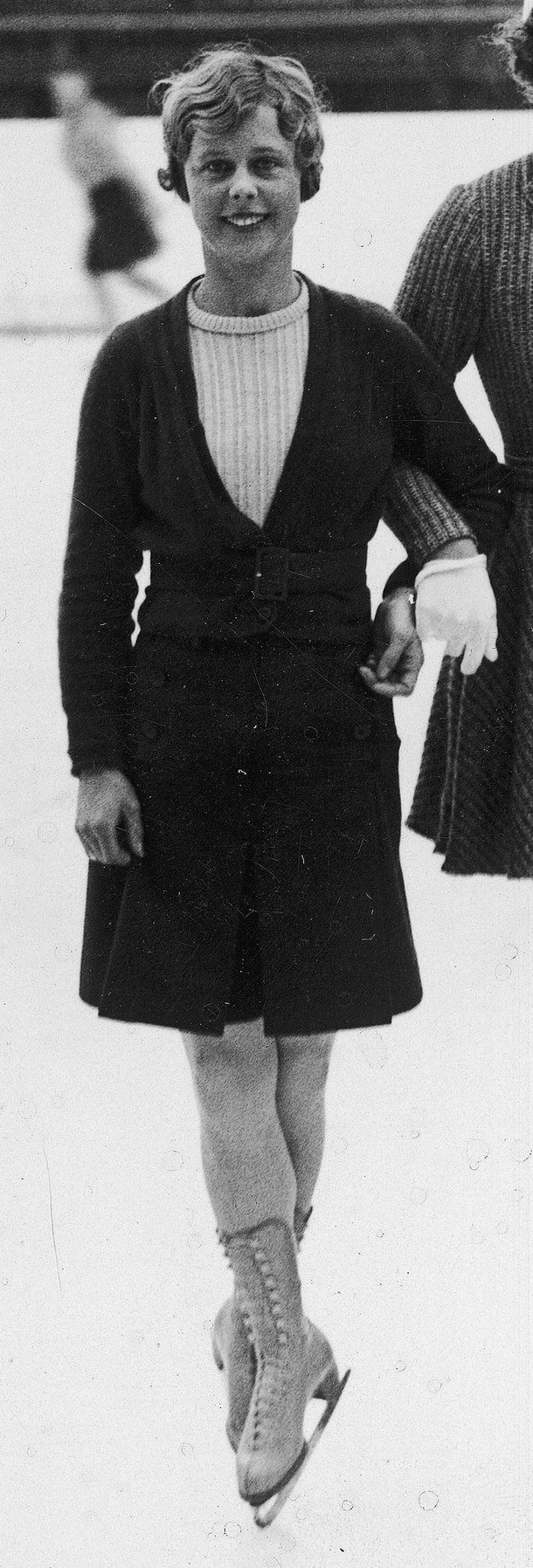
- Phillips at the 1936 Winter Olympics

Personal information
- Full name: Mollie Doreen Phillips
- Born: 27 July 1907 London, England
- Died: 15 December 1994 (aged 87) Lambeth, Greater London
- Height: 1.6 m (5 ft 3 in)

Figure skating career
- Country: Great Britain
Medal record
Representing United Kingdom
Pairs Figure skating
European Championships
Bronze medal – third place	1933 London	Pairs

Mollie Doreen Phillips OBE (27 July 1907 – 15 December 1994) was a British figure skater and Olympic judge. She is regarded as a pioneer in the sport. Phillips was the first woman to carry a national flag at the opening ceremony of an Olympic Games when she led out Great Britain at the 1932 Winter Olympics. In 1961 she became High Sheriff of Carmarthenshire, the first woman to hold the title.

== Biography ==
Mollie Doreen Phillips was born in London on 27 July 1907. Her father was George Phillips.

She studied law at Lincoln's Inn but focussed much of her time on figure skating. In 1949 she became the Cardiganshire County Commissioner for the Girl Guides Association. She held a variety of other public appointments, including Justice of the Peace, a member of the local police authority, and a General Commissioner of Income Tax. In 1949 Phillips became the manager of a dairy farm and found a new career as a breeder of dairy cattle.

Phillips died in Lambeth, Greater London on 15 December 1994 at the age of 87.

=== Skating career ===
Phillips was trained by Howard Nicholson and paired up with Rodney Murdoch to compete. In 1933 they skated as a partnership, winning the British championship and then bronze at the European Figure Skating Championships. After Murdoch retired she focussed on the singles events, achieving some success in British and European competitions.

Phillips competed at the 1932 Winter Olympics in Lake Placid, New York, and the 1936 Games at Garmisch-Partenkirchen, Germany. She competed in the women's singles event of the figure skating, finishing 9th and 11th respectively.

Phillips was the first woman to carry the flag and lead out her national team at any Olympic Games. The 1932 British Winter Olympic team comprised only four athletes, all in figure skating and all female. Phillips was by far the senior member of the team at the age of 24 compared to Joan Dix, the second oldest, at just 13 years of age. The other two competitors, Cecilia Colledge and Megan Taylor, were both 11.

In 1939 her election to the Council of the National Ice Skating Association, becoming the first woman to have such a role, caused some controversy amongst some of the men in charge of the sport. She went on to become a high-profile figure skating judge and, at the 1948 World Figure Skating Championships, the first woman to referee a world championship.

== Recognition ==
A Purple Plaque was installed in her honour in Carmarthen on 17 April 2026.

== Results ==
with Rodney Murdoch

Event	1933
European Championships	3rd
