= Folke Eriksson =

Swedish water polo player (1925–2008)

Personal information
- Born: April 27, 1925 Västerås, Sweden
- Died: March 12, 2008 (aged 82) Advance, North Carolina, U.S.

Sport
- Sport: Water polo

Anders Folke Eriksson (27 April 1925 – 12 March 2008) was a Swedish water polo player who competed in the 1948 Summer Olympics.

In 1948 he was a member of the Swedish team which finished fifth in the water polo tournament. He played four matches.

At club level, Eriksson represented Västerås SS.

== See also ==
- Sweden men's Olympic water polo team records and statistics
- List of men's Olympic water polo tournament goalkeepers
