= Rune Källqvist =

Swedish water polo player

Personal information
- Nationality: Swedish
- Born: 4 November 1929; Kinnarumma, Sweden
- Died: 3 March 1994 (aged 64); Gothenburg, Sweden

Sport
- Sport: Water polo

Rune Källqvist (4 November 1929 – 3 March 1994) was a Swedish water polo player. He competed in the men's tournament at the 1952 Summer Olympics.

== See also ==
- Sweden men's Olympic water polo team records and statistics
- List of men's Olympic water polo tournament goalkeepers
