= Rodney Murdoch =

Figure skating career
- Country: Great Britain
Medal record
Representing Great Britain
Figure skating: Pairs
European Championships
Bronze medal – third place	1933 London	Pairs

Rodney Murdoch was a British figure skater who competed in pair skating.

With partner Mollie Phillips, he won bronze at the 1933 European Figure Skating Championships in London.

== Competitive highlights ==
With Mollie Phillips

Event	1933
European Championships	3rd
