= Arthur Edwin Hill =

British water polo player

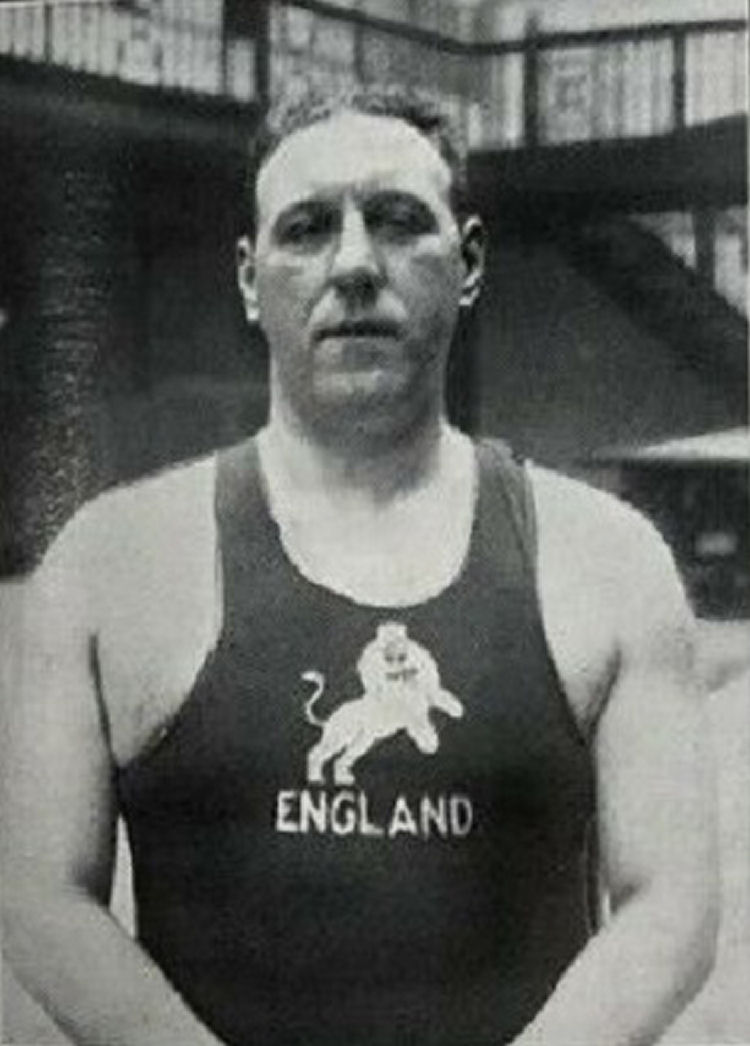

Personal information
- Born: January 9, 1888 Birmingham, Great Britain
- Died: June 5, 1966 (aged 78) Horsham, Great Britain

Sport
- Sport: Water polo
Medal record
Representing Great Britain
Olympic Games
Gold medal – first place	1912 Stockholm	Team competition

Arthur Edwin Hill (9 January 1888 – 5 June 1966) was a British water polo player who competed in the 1912 Summer Olympics. He was part of the British team, which was successful in winning a gold medal at the Stockholm Olympiad. Arthur Hill served in World War 1 and was a swimming champion in the Canadian Expeditionary Forces. He went on to represent New York Athletics Club in 1922 and several English counties: Staffordshire, 1908 to 1913, Sussex, 1923 to 1927 and Kent, 1928. Arthur Hill was Vice-President of Plaistow United Swimming Club, which won the English Water Polo Championship in the 1928/29 season.

On 13 June 1908 Arthur Hill married Mabel Jessie Evelyn Taylor living at their home in Birmingham. They had a son, Cedric Hill born on 31 July 1916.

In the 1930s, Arthur Hill and his wife, Marjorie, ran a pub called the Woodman, Plumstead Common, London SE16.

== See also ==
- Great Britain men's Olympic water polo team records and statistics
- List of Olympic champions in men's water polo
- List of Olympic medalists in water polo (men)
