= Arthur Grady =

British water polo player

Arthur Robert Grady
Personal information
- Nationality: British
- Born: 5 August 1922 Croydon, England
- Died: June 1995 (aged 72)

Sport
- Sport: Water polo

Arthur Robert Grady (5 August 1922 – June 1995) was a British water polo player. He competed in the men's tournament at the 1956 Summer Olympics.

== See also ==
- Great Britain men's Olympic water polo team records and statistics
- List of men's Olympic water polo tournament goalkeepers
