= Anders Flodqvist =

Swedish water polo player

Personal information
- Full name: Sten Anders Flodqvist
- Nationality: Swedish
- Born: 24 November 1959 (age 65); Stockholm, Sweden

Sport
- Sport: Water polo

Sten Anders Flodqvist (born 24 November 1959) is a Swedish water polo player. He competed in the men's tournament at the 1980 Summer Olympics.

Flodqvist represented Stockholmspolisens IF.

== See also ==
- Sweden men's Olympic water polo team records and statistics
- List of men's Olympic water polo tournament goalkeepers
