= Josef Wagner (water polo) =

Austrian water polo player

Personal information
- Nationality: Austrian
- Born: 17 March 1886; Vienna, Austria-Hungary

Sport
- Sport: Water polo

Josef Wagner (born 17 March 1886, date of death unknown) was an Austrian water polo player. He competed in the men's tournament at the 1912 Summer Olympics.
