= Paul Beulque =

French water polo player (1877–1943)

Personal information
- Nationality: French
- Born: 29 April 1877; Tourcoing, France
- Died: 1 November 1943 (aged 66); Tourcoing, France

Sport
- Sport: Water polo

Paul Beulque (29 April 1877 – 1 November 1943) was a French water polo player. He competed in the men's tournament at the 1912 Summer Olympics.
