= Ian Johnson (water polo) =

British water polo player

Personal information
- Nationality: British
- Born: 1930; Motherwell, Scotland
- Died: 2001 (aged 70–71); Motherwell, Scotland

Sport
- Sport: Water polo

John Thomson "Ian" Johnson (1930–2001) was a British water polo player. He competed at the 1948 Summer Olympics and the 1952 Summer Olympics.

== See also ==
- Great Britain men's Olympic water polo team records and statistics
- List of men's Olympic water polo tournament goalkeepers
