= Vilhelm Andersson =

Swedish water polo player (1891–1933)

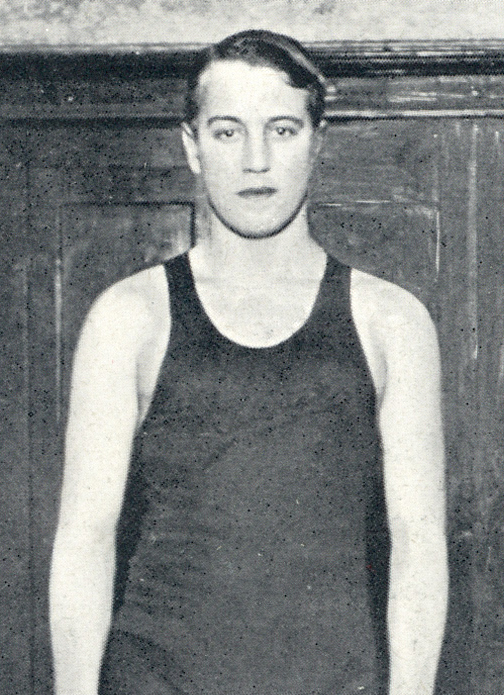

Personal information
- Born: 11 March 1891 Stockholm, Sweden
- Died: 21 September 1933 (aged 42) Stockholm, Sweden

Sport
- Sport: Water polo
- Club: SK Neptun
Medal record
Representing Sweden
Olympic Games
Silver medal – second place	1912 Stockholm	Team competition
Bronze medal – third place	1920 Antwerp	Team competition

Kletus Vilhelm "Wille" Andersson (11 March 1891 – 21 September 1933) was a Swedish water polo player and freestyle swimmer. He competed in water polo at the 1908, 1912, 1920 and 1924 Summer Olympics and won a silver medal in 1912 and a bronze in 1920, finishing fourth in 1924. In swimming he competed at the 1908 and 1912 Olympics and won 18 national titles between 1909 and 1920.

He was the son of Cletus William Andersson, a dentist. His younger brother Erik Cletus Thule Andersson also competed in water polo at the 1924 Olympics.

== See also ==
- List of Olympic medalists in water polo (men)
