= Pierre Nijs =

Belgian water polo player

Personal information
- Born: 4 January 1890 Antwerp, Belgium
- Died: 12 June 1939 (aged 49) Antwerp, Belgium

Sport
- Sport: Water polo
Medal record
Representing Belgium
Olympic Games
Silver medal – second place	1920 Antwerp	Team competition
Bronze medal – third place	1912 Stockholm	Team competition

Léon Pierre Nijs (4 January 1890 – 12 June 1939) was a Belgian water polo player who competed in the 1912 Summer Olympics and in the 1920 Summer Olympics. He was part of the Belgian team and was able to win a silver and a bronze medal. He was born, and died, in Antwerp.

== See also ==
- List of Olympic medalists in water polo (men)
