= Great Britain at the 1932 Winter Olympics =

- Flag of the United Kingdom
- IOC code: GBR
- NOC: British Olympic Association

in Lake Placid
- Competitors: 4 (women) in 1 sport
- Flag bearer: Mollie Phillips
- Medals: Gold 0 Silver 0 Bronze 0 Total 0

Winter Olympics appearances (overview)
- 1924; 1928; 1932; 1936; 1948; 1952; 1956; 1960; 1964; 1968; 1972; 1976; 1980; 1984; 1988; 1992; 1994; 1998; 2002; 2006; 2010; 2014; 2018; 2022; 2026

The United Kingdom of Great Britain and Northern Ireland competed as Great Britain at the 1932 Winter Olympics in Lake Placid, United States. This was the first time in Olympic history that Great Britain had not won a medal of any colour.

The Great Britain team included 11-year-old figure skater Cecilia Colledge - the youngest ever British athlete to appear in the Olympic Games (Winter or Summer).

== Figure skating ==
Women

Athlete	Event	CF	FS	Places	Points	Final rank
Joan Dix	Women's singles	11	11	75	1833.6	10
Mollie Phillips	Women's singles	9	9	63	1864.7	9
Cecilia Colledge	Women's singles	8	10	64	1851.6	8
Megan Taylor	Women's singles	7	7	55	1911.8	7
