= William Quick (water polo) =

British water polo player

Personal information
- Nationality: British
- Born: 19 April 1902; Cardiff, Wales
- Died: July 1994; Swansea, Wales

Sport
- Sport: Water polo

William Quick (19 April 1902 – July 1994) was a British water polo player. He competed in the men's tournament at the 1928 Summer Olympics.

== See also ==
- Great Britain men's Olympic water polo team records and statistics
- List of men's Olympic water polo tournament goalkeepers
