= Gustave Prouvost =

French water polo player

Personal information
- Nationality: France
- Born: 25 March 1887 Tourcoing, France

Sport
- Sport: Water polo

Senior clubs
- Years: Team
- –: EN Tourcoing,
- –: Tourcoing
National team
- Years: Team
- ?-?: France

Gustave Prouvost (born 25 March 1887, date of death unknown) was a French water polo player. He was a member of the France men's national water polo team. He competed with the team at the 1912 Summer Olympics.
