= Jean Hoffman (water polo) =

Belgian water polo player (1893–c.1932)

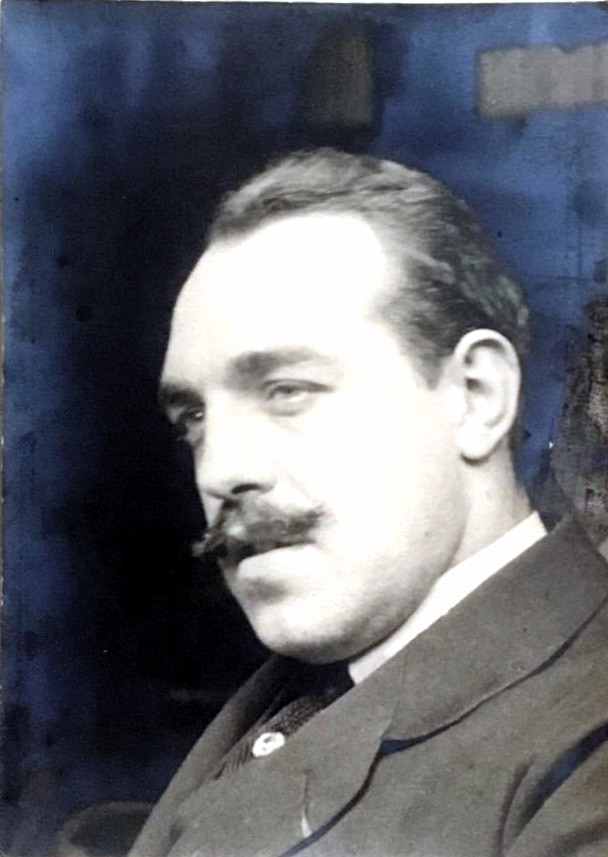

Personal information
- Born: September 29, 1893 Brussels, Belgium
- Died: December 1, 1932 (to be checked) Brussels, Belgium

Sport
- Sport: Water polo
Medal record
Representing Belgium
Olympic Games
Bronze medal – third place	1912 Stockholm	Team competition

Jean Hoffman (born 29 September 1893, date of death 1932) was a Belgian water polo player who competed in the 1912 Summer Olympics. He was part of the Belgian water polo team, which won a bronze medal.

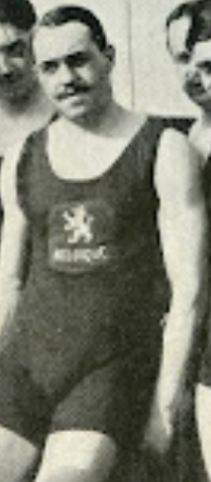

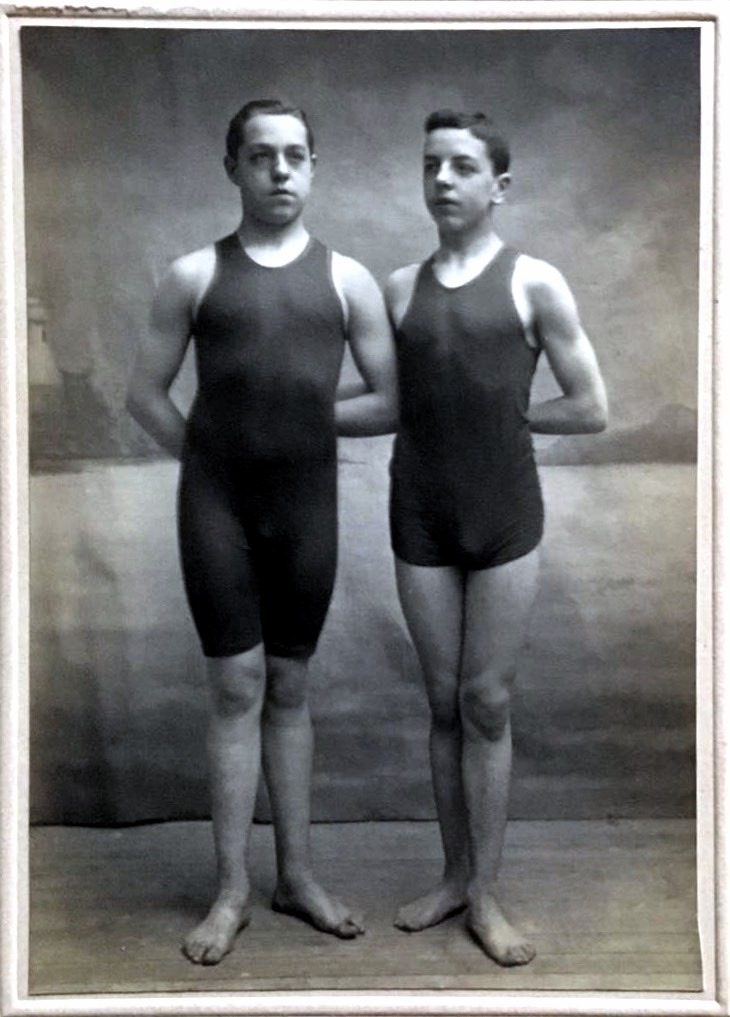
Jean and Ernest Hoffman swimmers of the Royal Brussels swimming and water polo club

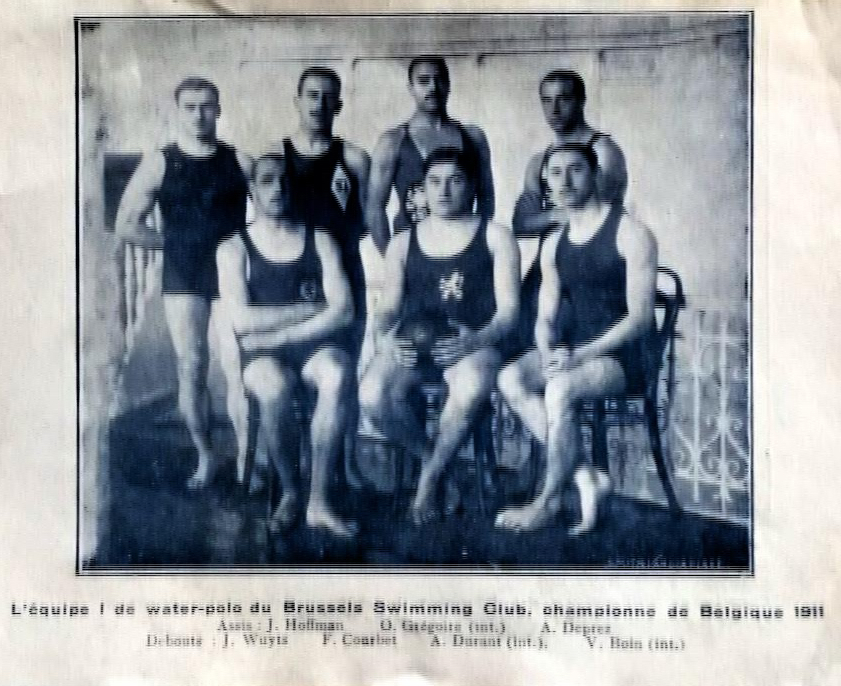
Royal Brussels Swimming and water polo team, belgium champion in 1911.

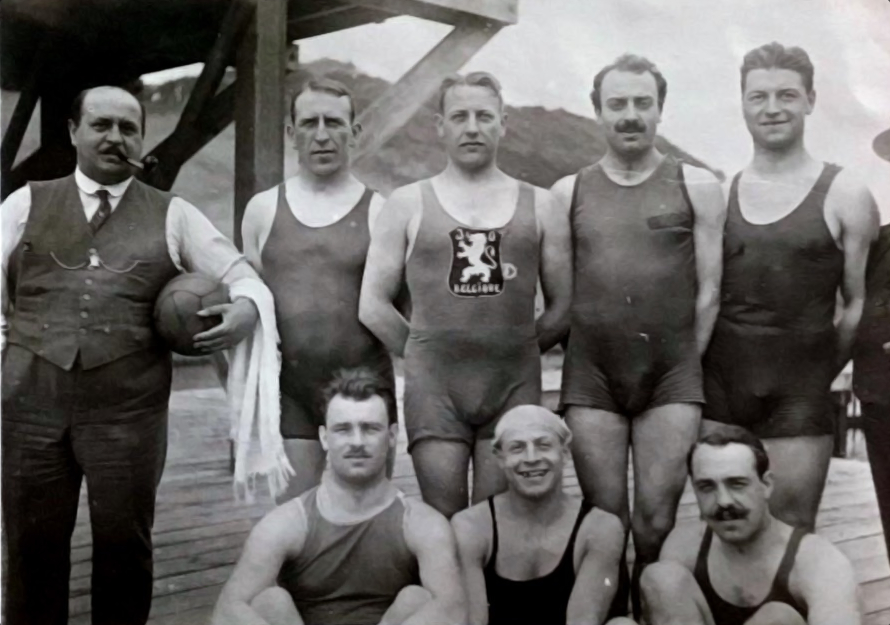
Water polo belgium team

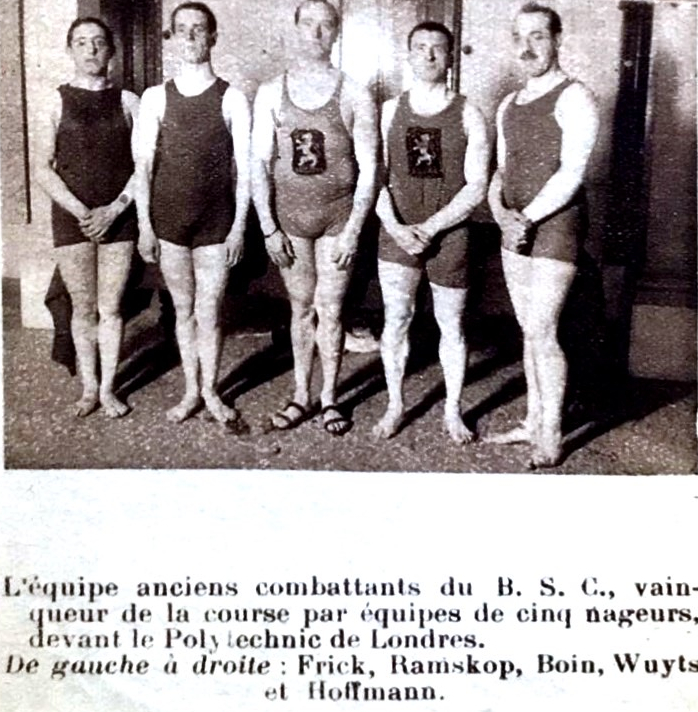
Veterans team of the Royal Brussels Swimming Club. Inter army race winner.

All Pictures are from Philippe Hofmann - Jean Hoffman's granson - family archives
