= Theodor Nauman =

Swedish water polo player

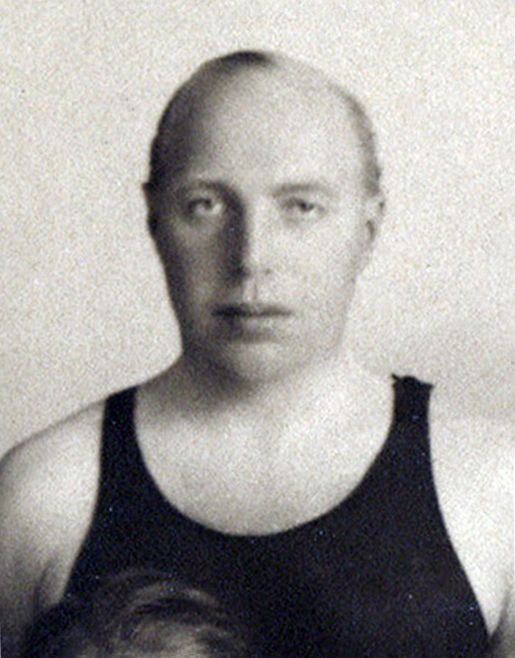

Personal information
- Born: 7 December 1885 Stockholm, Sweden
- Died: 6 February 1947 (aged 61) Stockholm, Sweden

Sport
- Sport: Water polo
- Club: Stockholms KK
Medal record
Representing Sweden
Olympic Games
Bronze medal – third place	1920 Antwerp	Team competition

Frans Johan Theodor Nauman (7 December 1885 – 6 February 1947) was a Swedish water polo goalkeeper. He competed at the 1920 and 1924 Summer Olympics and finished in third and fourth place, respectively. His son Åke also became an Olympic water polo goalkeeper.

== See also ==
- Sweden men's Olympic water polo team records and statistics
- List of Olympic medalists in water polo (men)
- List of men's Olympic water polo tournament goalkeepers
