= Åke Nauman =

Swedish water polo player

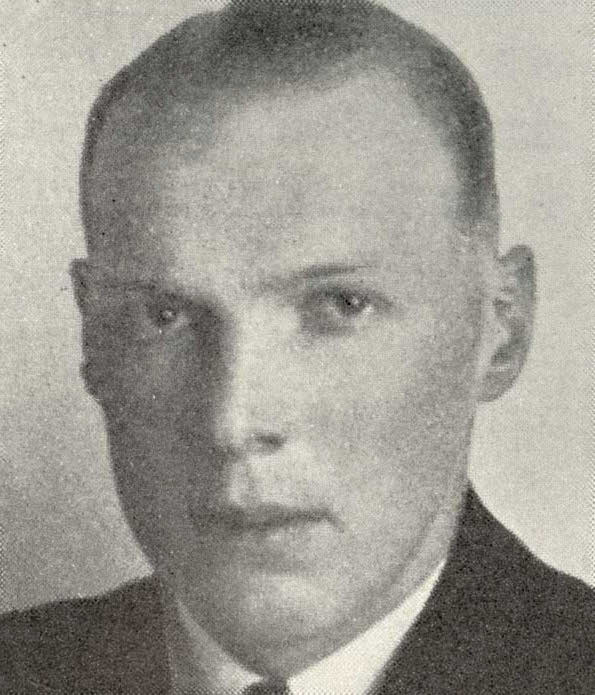

Personal information
- Born: 28 March 1908 Stockholm, Sweden
- Died: 18 May 1995 (aged 87) Stockholm, Sweden

Sport
- Sport: Water polo
- Club: Stockholms KK

Frans Åke Theodor Nauman (28 March 1908 – 18 May 1995) was a Swedish water polo goalkeeper. He competed at the 1936 Summer Olympics and finished in seventh place. His father Theodor was also a water polo goalkeeper.

== See also ==
- Sweden men's Olympic water polo team records and statistics
- List of men's Olympic water polo tournament goalkeepers
