= Leslie Ablett =

British water polo player

Personal information
- Born: 6 March 1904; Birkenhead, Great Britain
- Died: 22 April 1952 (aged 48); Liverpool, Great Britain

Sport
- Sport: Water polo

Leslie Ablett (6 March 1904 – 22 April 1952) was a British water polo player who competed in the 1928 Summer Olympics and in the 1936 Summer Olympics.

In the 1928 tournament he played three matches as goalkeeper for the British team.

Eight years later he was part of the British team which finished eighth in the 1936 tournament. He played three matches as goalkeeper.

== See also ==
- Great Britain men's Olympic water polo team records and statistics
- List of men's Olympic water polo tournament goalkeepers
