= Alfred North (water polo) =

British water polo player

Personal information
- Born: 7 February 1906; West Ham, Great Britain
- Died: 1 September 1988 (aged 82)

Sport
- Sport: Water polo

Alfred Sydney North (7 February 1906 – 1 September 1988) was a British water polo player who competed in the 1936 Summer Olympics.

He was part of the British team which finished eighth in the 1936 tournament. He played four matches as goalkeeper.

== See also ==
- Great Britain men's Olympic water polo team records and statistics
- List of men's Olympic water polo tournament goalkeepers
