= Torsten Kumfeldt =

Swedish water polo player (1886–1966)

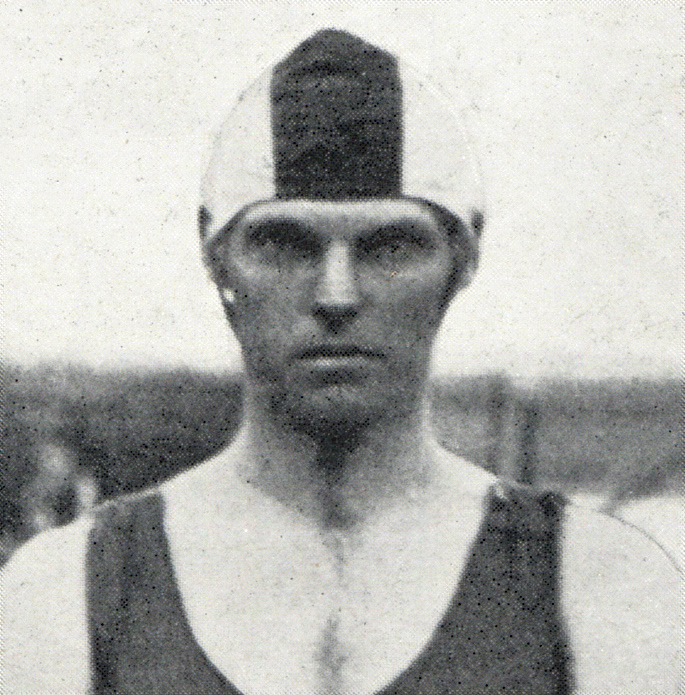

Personal information
- Born: 4 January 1886 Örebro, Sweden
- Died: 2 May 1966 (aged 80) Stockholm, Sweden

Sport
- Sport: Water polo
- Club: Stockholms KK
Medal record
Representing Sweden
Olympic Games
| Bronze medal – third place | 1908 London | Team competition |
| Silver medal – second place | 1912 Stockholm | Team competition |
| Bronze medal – third place | 1920 Antwerp | Team competition |

Karl Torsten Kumfeldt (4 January 1886 – 2 May 1966) was a Swedish water polo goalkeeper and breaststroke swimmer. He competed in water polo at the 1908, 1912 and 1920 Summer Olympics and won one silver and two bronze medals. In 1908, he also took part in the 200 m breaststroke event.

== Biography ==
Kumfeldt won seven national water polo titles with his club Stockholm KK. Between 1910 and 1912, he was secretary of the Swedish Swimming Federation and spent much effort on preparing swimming venues for the 1912 Summer Olympics in Stockholm.

== See also ==
- Sweden men's Olympic water polo team records and statistics
- Dual sport and multi-sport Olympians
- List of Olympic medalists in water polo (men)
- List of men's Olympic water polo tournament goalkeepers
