= Rune Öberg =

Swedish water polo player

Personal information
- Born: 26 December 1922 Stockholm, Sweden
- Died: 17 April 2002 (aged 79) Stockholm, Sweden

Sport
- Sport: Water polo

Rune Ewert Öberg (26 December 1922 – 17 April 2002) was a Swedish water polo player who competed in the 1948 Summer Olympics. In 1948 he was part of the Swedish team which finished fifth in the water polo tournament. He played six matches.

== See also ==
- Sweden men's Olympic water polo team records and statistics
- List of men's Olympic water polo tournament goalkeepers
