= Arthur Hunt (water polo) =

British water polo player

Personal information
- Full name: Arthur William James Hunt
- Born: 27 August 1886 Lambeth, Greater London, Great Britain
- Died: 29 September 1949 (aged 63) Bridgwater, Somerset, Great Britain
- Occupation: Inspector - City of London Police

Arthur William James Hunt (27 August 1886 – 29 September 1949) was a water polo player from Lambeth, United Kingdom. He was a competitor at the 1924 Summer Olympics who competed at the Men's Water Polo event representing Great Britain. His team lost to Hungary in round one at 6-7 and did not advance any further.

Arthur was given the honour to carry the national flag of Great Britain at the opening ceremony of the 1924 Summer Olympics, becoming the third water polo player to be a flag bearer at the opening and closing ceremonies of the Olympics.

1905 - Played capped for Guernsey at football. 1909 - Held all the Kent County Swimming Championships up to and including 440 yards. Represented Kent at Water Polo. 1909 - Won 220 & 440 yards at Southern Counties Championships, together with various London Championships. 1912 - Olympic trials he was described as "the fastest over-arm sprinter ever seen in England". 1914-18 - Served in the Royal Garrison Artillery(Siege Battery). Also Gunnery Instructor. 1919-1935 - Hon Secretary of City of London Police Swimming Club. Played Water Polo for the Police. 1921 - Led Surrey Water Polo team to first ever County Championship. 1921-24 - Capped when playing for the England Water Polo team. 1924 - Flag bearer for the Great Britain team during the 1924 Summer Olympics opening ceremony. Later became Vice President of the Amateur Swimming Club.

== See also ==
- Great Britain men's Olympic water polo team records and statistics
