= Isaac Bentham =

British water polo player

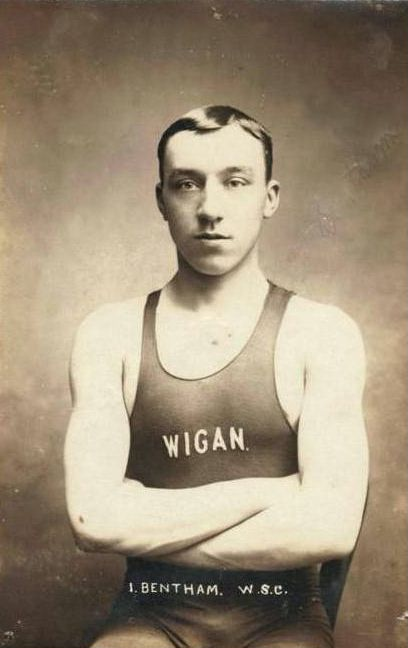
- Benthan in 1912

Personal information
- Born: October 27, 1886 Wigan, England
- Died: May 15, 1917 (aged 30) Arras, France

Sport
- Sport: Water polo
Medal record
Representing Great Britain
Olympic Games
Gold medal – first place	1912 Stockholm	Team competition

Isaac Bentham (27 October 1886 – 15 May 1917) was a British water polo player who competed in the 1912 Summer Olympics. He was part of the British team, which was able to win the gold medal.

He was killed in action, aged 30, in the Battle of Arras during World War I. He died on 15 May 1917, whilst serving as a sergeant in the Royal Field Artillery on the Western Front in France. He has no known grave. He is commemorated on the Arras War Memorial.

== See also ==
- Great Britain men's Olympic water polo team records and statistics
- List of Olympic champions in men's water polo
- List of Olympic medalists in water polo (men)
- List of Olympians killed in World War I
