= Christopher Jones (water polo) =

British water polo player (1884–1937)

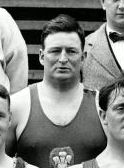
- Christopher Jones in 1920

Personal information
- Born: 23 June 1884 Penarth, Great Britain
- Died: 18 December 1937 (aged 53)

Sport
- Sport: Water polo
Medal record
Representing Great Britain
Olympic Games
Gold medal – first place	1920 Antwerp	Team competition

Christopher Jones (23 June 1884 in Penarth – 18 December 1937) was a British water polo player who competed in the 1920 Summer Olympics. He was part of the British team which won the gold medal.

== See also ==
- Great Britain men's Olympic water polo team records and statistics
- List of Olympic champions in men's water polo
- List of Olympic medalists in water polo (men)
