= William Peacock (water polo) =

Scottish water polo player

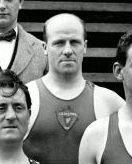
- William Peacock in 1920

Personal information
- Born: 6 December 1891 Poplar, London, England
- Died: 14 December 1948 (aged 57) Sawtry, England

Sport
- Sport: Water polo
- Club: Paisley Swimming Club
Medal record
Representing Great Britain
Olympic Games
| Gold medal – first place | 1920 Antwerp | Team competition |

William Peacock (6 December 1891 – 14 December 1948) was a Scottish water polo player who competed in the 1920 Summer Olympics for Great Britain. He was part of the British team, which was able to win the gold medal.

== See also ==
- Great Britain men's Olympic water polo team records and statistics
- List of Olympic champions in men's water polo
- List of Olympic medalists in water polo (men)
