= Charles Sydney Smith =

British water polo player

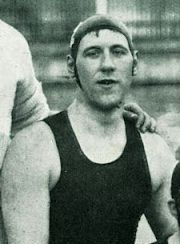
- Charles Sydney Smith at the 1912 Summer Olympic Games, Stockholm

Personal information
- National team: England
- Born: 26 January 1876 Wigan, England
- Died: 6 April 1951 (aged 75) Southport, England

Sport
- Country: England
- Sport: Water polo
- Position: goal
Medal record
Representing Great Britain
Olympic Games
Men's Water Polo
Gold medal – first place	1908 London	Team competition
Gold medal – first place	1912 Stockholm	Team competition
Gold medal – first place	1920 Antwerp	Team competition

Charles Sydney Smith (26 January 1876 – 6 April 1951) was a British water polo player who competed as goalkeeper for the England Water Polo team which won gold medals in the London games of 1908, and the Stockholm games of 1912. After the Great War he returned, at the age of 44, as part of the Great Britain team to win a third gold medal at the Antwerp games in 1920. He was still in the team four years later competing in the Paris games of 1924 where the team was knocked out in the first round by the Hungarian team after extra time.

Smith is the oldest water polo player to compete at the Olympics. On 13 July 1924, he played his last match at the age of 45 years and 169 days in the Paris Olympics. Smith is also the oldest Olympic gold medalist in water polo. At the age of 41 years and 216 days, he won the third Olympic gold medal on 29 August 1920. Smith is one of ten male athletes who won three Olympic gold medals in water polo.

Smith was chosen to represent the country as the flag bearer at the 1912 Summer Olympics in Stockholm, Sweden. This made him the first competing athlete to carry the flag for Great Britain, and the first water polo player to be a flag bearer at the opening and closing ceremonies of the Olympics.

== See also ==
- Great Britain men's Olympic water polo team records and statistics
- List of multiple Olympic gold medalists in one event
- List of Olympic champions in men's water polo
- List of Olympic medalists in water polo (men)
- List of players who have appeared in multiple men's Olympic water polo tournaments
- List of men's Olympic water polo tournament goalkeepers
- List of flag bearers for Great Britain at the Olympics
- List of members of the International Swimming Hall of Fame
