= Paul Radmilovic =

British swimmer and water polo player

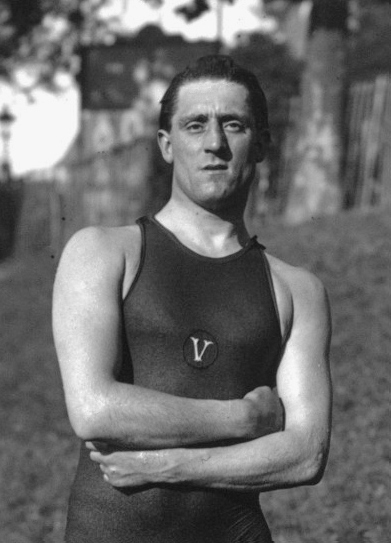
- Radmilovic in 1909

Personal information
- Full name: Paolo Francesco Radmilovic
- Nickname: "Raddy"
- National team: Great Britain
- Born: 5 March 1886 Cardiff, Wales
- Died: 29 September 1968 (aged 82) Weston-super-Mare, England
- Height: 1.80 m (5 ft 11 in)
- Weight: 76 kg (168 lb; 12.0 st)

Sport
- Sport: Swimming
- Strokes: Freestyle, water polo
- Club: Welsh Amateur Swimming Association; Weston-super-Mare Water Polo Club
Medal record
Representing Great Britain
Olympic Games
Men's water polo
Gold medal – first place	1908 London	Water polo team
Gold medal – first place	1912 Stockholm	Water polo team
Gold medal – first place	1920 Antwerp	Water polo team
Men's swimming
Gold medal – first place	1908 London	4×200 m freestyle

Paolo Francesco Radmilovic (5 March 1886 – 29 September 1968) was a Welsh water polo player and competitive swimmer. Radmilovic had Croatian and Irish origins. He represented Great Britain at four Summer Olympics. He won four Olympic titles in a 22-year Olympic career. He won four gold medals across three successive Olympic Games, a record which stood for a Great Britain Olympic athlete until broken by Sir Steve Redgrave when he won his fifth gold medal at Sydney in 2000. In 1928, he became the first person to compete for Britain at five Olympic Games, a record that would remain until surpassed by fencer Bill Hoskyns in 1976.

== Early life and family ==
Radmilovic was born in the Tiger Bay area of Cardiff, Wales, the third son of Antun Radmilović, a native of Dubrovnik who relocated to Cardiff in 1860s and became the landlord of the Glastonbury Arms pub in Bute Street. His mother was born in Cardiff, the daughter of Irish immigrants. Radmilovics were also the landlords of the Bute Dock Tavern in Bute Street.

His paternal ancestors were from Makarska; grandfather from Makarska and grandmother from Dubrovnik were married and living in Dubrovnik.

== Swimming career ==
Radmilovic made his debut for the Wales national water polo team at the age of 15 in 1901 and at the time was the youngest international player in the history of the sport. He competed in international swimming and water polo for nearly 30 years and was still an active swimmer well into his seventies. He was also a competent golfer and footballer.

He won his first Amateur Swimming Association title in 1907 when victorious in the open water 5 mile race in the River Thames. His noted versatility came to the fore two years later when he won the 100 yards freestyle. He won the English Long Distance Championships in 1907 and 1925, the latter at age 39. A year later, he won the English One Mile Championship at age 40. A reporter for the 'Swimming Times' wrote of his 1925 victory:

Until last year he had never held the 1 mile championship of England, but at the East India docks he had quite a comfortable win. "Raddy" believes in careful and systematic training so that before the race, he has some idea as to what the final result would be. Before the mile championship, he is credited with saying: "I shall beat 24 minutes, 30 seconds." He won easily in 24.22. How many of the younger generation could demonstrate such judgment of pace over a distance?

In all he won nine titles over a 19-year span at a variety of distances. His victories at the Welsh national championship took place over an ever-greater timespan. A 100 yards title at the age of 15 in 1901 and a 440 yards victory at the age of 43 in 1929 book-ending his career.

== Olympic career ==
His Olympic career began as a swimmer at the 1906 Intercalated Games where he finished 4th in 100 metres freestyle and 5th in the 400 metres event. In the 1 mile event he did not finish.

In 1908 he won a gold medal as part of the British water polo team that defeated Belgium 9–2 in the final. Radmilovic scored twice in the final. Two days later he was drafted into the 4×200 metre relay squad when another swimmer withdrew due to illness and swam the second leg of a dramatic race. Hungary appeared to be cruising to victory when anchor leg swimmer Zoltán Halmay began to lose consciousness in the water. Halmay struggled to the finish but Henry Taylor had touched four seconds earlier to give the British victory. Radmilovic also competed in three individual freestyle events but failed to make a final.

Radmilovic moved to Weston-super-Mare in 1904 and all Olympic successes were gained whilst a resident of this Somerset resort and where he was a member of the local swimming and water polo clubs.

He won his third career gold as part of the British water polo team at the 1912 Summer Olympics in Stockholm. The Austrians were defeated 8–0 in the final.

Radmilovic's fourth and final gold came at the 1920 Summer Olympics in Antwerp albeit in eventful circumstances. Great Britain and Belgium had impressed in reaching the final and the game itself was a tight one decided when Radmilovic scored to put the British 3–2 ahead. On the final whistle incensed Belgian spectators attempted to attack the British players. Armed police guarded the team as they left the pool.

He competed as a member of the British team in both the 1924 and 1928 Olympic water polo tournaments without medal success. He was 42 years old when his Olympic career ended.

His record of four gold medals by a British Olympian stood until Sir Steve Redgrave equalled and eventually broke it by winning his fifth title in the 2000 Summer Olympics in Sydney

Including the 1906 Intercalated Games, he competed at six Olympic Games. It would only be in 1976 when another athlete, fencer Bill Hoskyns, would compete at six Games for Great Britain.

Radmilovic was the first athlete to compete in water polo at five Olympics, and one of ten male players who won three Olympic gold medals in water polo.

== Post-Olympics ==
Radmilovic was one of only two Welsh athletes to represent Wales at the 1930 British Empire Games. Aged 44 at the time, he was sent by the Welsh Amateur Swimming Association, along with female swimmer Valerie Davies.

He ran the Imperial Hotel in Weston-super-Mare, England for many years, and was still swimming 400 m a day at age seventy-eight.

In 1967, he was inducted in the International Swimming Hall of Fame. He was the second water polo player (after American Wallace O'Connor) and the third Briton (after coach Matthew Mann and English Channel swimmer Captain Matthew Webb) to be inducted.

Radmilovic died in Weston-super-Mare, England, in 1968 and is buried in Weston Cemetery on Milton Road. His son took over the running of the hotel and continued to display his father's vast trophy collection.

== Legacy ==
He was inducted into the Welsh Sports Hall of Fame in 1993.

To celebrate the one hundredth anniversary of his 1908 double-gold Olympic performance, a plaque was placed on the Cardiff International Pool to honour him, paid for by the 2012 London Olympics Committee and the Welsh Assembly.

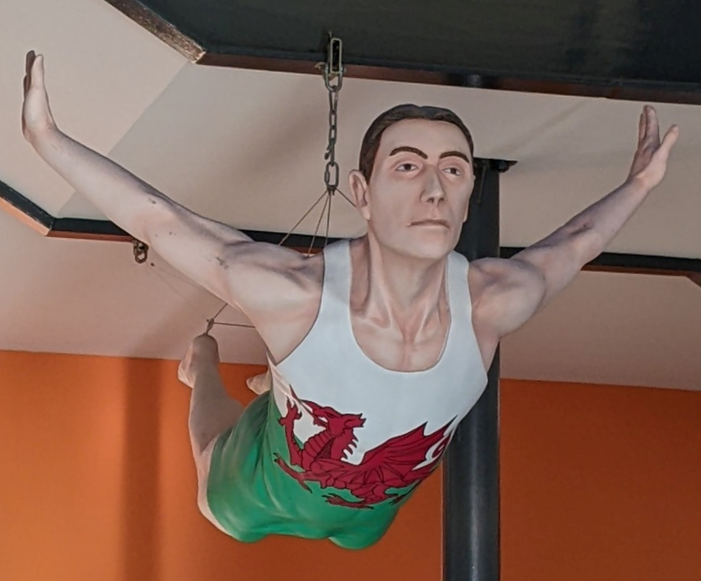
Statue of Paulo Radmilovic at Swansea's LC Leisure Centre

A blue plaque was unveiled by the Mayor of Weston-super-Mare, Cllr Alan Peak, and Paulo Radmilovic's grandson, Simon Siddall on the wall of The Imperial, South Parade, Weston-super-Mare on 30 March 2017.

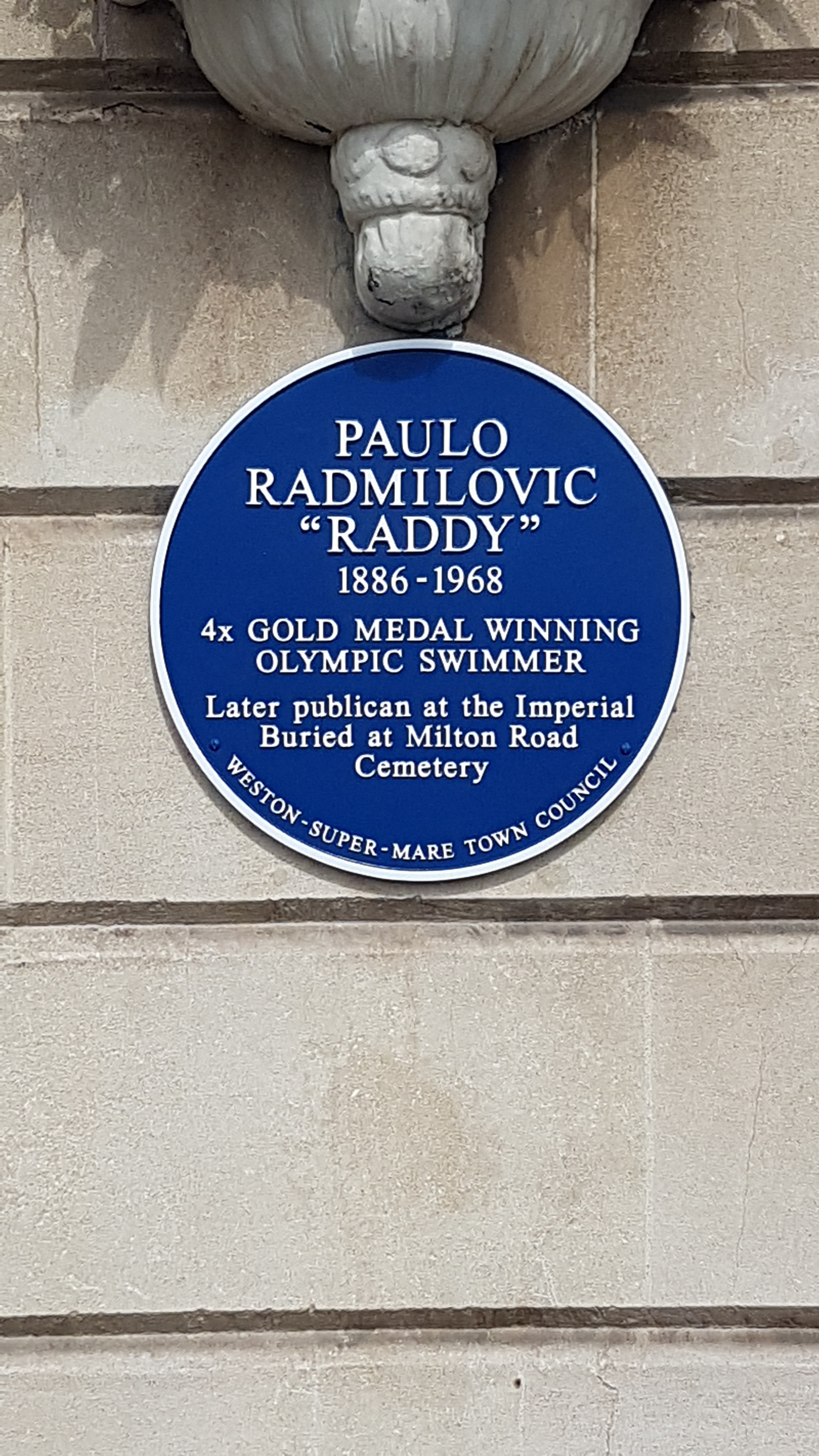
The blue plaque unveiled by his grandson, Simon Siddall on the wall of The Imperial, South Parade, Weston-super-Mare

== See also ==
- Great Britain men's Olympic water polo team records and statistics
- List of athletes with the most appearances at Olympic Games
- List of members of the International Swimming Hall of Fame
- List of multi-sport athletes
- List of multi-sport champions
- List of multiple Olympic gold medalists
- List of multiple Olympic gold medalists in one event
- List of Olympic champions in men's water polo
- List of Olympic medalists in swimming (men)
- List of Olympic medalists in water polo (men)
- List of players who have appeared in multiple men's Olympic water polo tournaments
- World record progression 4 × 200 metres freestyle relay
