= Charles Bugbee =

British water polo player

Personal information
- Born: 29 August 1887 Stratford, London, England
- Died: 18 October 1959 (aged 72) Edgware, London, England

Sport
- Sport: Water polo
Medal record
Representing Great Britain
Men's Water Polo
Gold medal – first place	1912 Stockholm	Team competition
Gold medal – first place	1920 Antwerp	Team competition

Charles Bugbee (29 August 1887 – 18 October 1959) was a British water polo player who competed in the 1912 Summer Olympics, the 1920 Summer Olympics, and the 1924 Summer Olympics.

He was part of the British water polo team, which won gold medals in 1912 and 1920. He also participated in the 1924 Olympic water polo tournament, but the British team lost their first-round game. A City of London policeman, he served in the Great War as a leading mechanic in the Royal Naval Air Service, from May 1915 until April 1918 and then in the R.A.F. until 1919. In addition to his Olympic medals, he was awarded the 1914/15 Star, British War and Victory Medals, and the 1911 City of London Police Coronation Medal.

== See also ==
- Great Britain men's Olympic water polo team records and statistics
- List of Olympic champions in men's water polo
- List of Olympic medalists in water polo (men)
