= William Henry Dean =

British water polo player

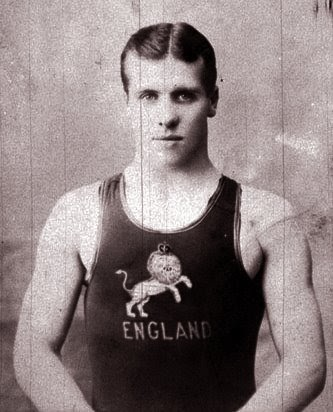
- William Henry Dean, 1920

Personal information
- Nationality: British
- Born: 6 February 1887
- Died: 2 May 1949 (aged 62)

Sport
- Country: (United Kingdom) Great Britain
- Sport: Water Polo
Medal record
Men's water polo
Gold medal – first place	1920 Antwerp	Team competition

William Henry Dean (6 February 1887 – 2 May 1949) was a British water polo player who competed in the 1920 Summer Olympics. He was a member of the British team, which won the gold medal.

== See also ==
- Great Britain men's Olympic water polo team records and statistics
- List of Olympic champions in men's water polo
- List of Olympic medalists in water polo (men)
