= Sweden men's national water polo team =

Sweden
- FINA code: SWE
- Association: Swedish Swimming Federation
- Confederation: LEN (Europe)

Olympic Games (team statistics)
- Appearances: 8 (first in 1908)
- Best result: (silver) (1912)

Media
- Website: svensksimidrott.se

The Sweden men's national water polo team represents Sweden in international men's water polo. The team has participated in eight tournaments at the Summer Olympics, and won bronze in 1908 and 1920, and silver in 1912.

== Results ==
=== Olympic Games ===
- 1908 — (bronze) Bronze medal
- 1912 — (silver) Silver medal
- 1920 — (bronze) Bronze medal
- 1924 — 4th place
- 1936 — 7th place
- 1948 — 5th place
- 1952 — 11th place
- 1980 — 11th place

== See also ==
- Sweden men's Olympic water polo team records and statistics
