= Water polo at the 1912 Summer Olympics =

Men's water polo at the Games of the V Olympiad
- Venue: Djurgårdsbrunnsviken
- Dates: 7–16 July
- Competitors: 46 from 6 nations

Medalists
1st place, gold medalist(s)		Great Britain men's national water polo team Great Britain
2nd place, silver medalist(s)		Sweden men's national water polo team Sweden
3rd place, bronze medalist(s)		Belgium men's national water polo team Belgium

The 1912 Summer Olympics in Stockholm saw the fourth water polo tournament at the Olympics. All games took place in the newly built swimming stadium in Djurgårdsbrunnsviken from 7 to 16 July 1912. All medals were decided by the Bergvall system.

== Medal summary ==
Gold	Silver	Bronze
Great Britain; Charles Sydney Smith; George Cornet; George Wilkinson; Charles Bugbee; Arthur Edwin Hill; Paul Radmilovic; Isaac Bentham	Sweden; Torsten Kumfeldt; Harald Julin; Max Gumpel; Robert Andersson; Pontus Hanson; Vilhelm Andersson; Erik Bergqvist	Belgium; Albert Durant; Herman Donners; Victor Boin; Herman Meyboom; Joseph Pletinckx; Oscar Grégoire; Félicien Courbet; Jean Hoffman; Pierre Nijs

The competitions in water polo were arranged on the Cup Tie (elimination) system, but in such a way that the necessary number of matches had to be played for the second and third prizes between the teams qualified to take part in these rounds. The principle was adopted that a team which had not been beaten, direct or indirect, by a team that was qualified to fight for the second or third prize, should have the right to play against the team last-mentioned, even if it (the first-named) had already been beaten by some other team. The teams entered were drawn in pairs for the first round, after which the order in which they were to meet in the second round was determined by drawing lots, so that the order in which the games were to be played, right up to the final, was fixed before the games began.

== Participating nations ==
A total of 45 water polo players from 6 nations competed at the Stockholm Games:

- Austria (7)
- Belgium (9)
- France (8)
- Great Britain (7)
- Hungary (7)
- Sweden (7)

== Bracket ==
First round
7 July - Djurgårdsbrunnsviken
Great Britain (a.e.t.)	7
Belgium	5
8 July - Djurgårdsbrunnsviken
Sweden	7
France	2
9 July - Djurgårdsbrunnsviken
Austria	5
Hungary	4

Second round
11 July - Djurgårdsbrunnsviken
Great Britain	6
Sweden	3
No Opponent
Austria	w/o

Gold medal match
13 July - Djurgårdsbrunnsviken
Great Britain	8
Austria	0

=== Results ===
==== Main Tournament to Gold ====
First Round
7 July	Great Britain	7	–	5	Belgium	after extra time
	Hill (2), Wilkinson (2), Radmilovic (2), Bentham	(2	–	3)	Grégoire (2), Meyboom (2), Nijs
8 July	Sweden	7	–	2	France
	R. Andersson (3), Bergqvist (3), ?	(4	–	0)	Decoin, Provost
9 July	Austria	5	–	4	Hungary
	Scheff, ?	(1	–	2)	Fazekas, Hégner, Rémi, ?
Second Round
11 July	Great Britain	6	–	3	Sweden
	Wilkinson (3), Hill, Radmilovic, Bentham	(3	–	0)	R. Andersson (2), V. Andersson
Gold medal match
13 July	Great Britain	8	–	0	Austria
	?	(4	–	0)
==== Tournament to Silver ====
First Round
10 July	Belgium	6	–	5	Hungary
	?	(2	–	3)	Fazekas (3), Rémi, ?
11 July	Belgium	4	–	1	France
	?	(2	–	1)	?
Second Round
14 July	Sweden	8	–	1	Austria
	R. Andersson (3), Bergqvist (3), V. Andersson (2)	(5	–	1)	Scheff
15 July	Belgium	5	–	4	Austria
	?	(2	–	1)	Scheff, ?
Silver and Bronze medal match
16 July	Sweden	4	–	2	Belgium
	Bergqvist (2), V. Andersson, R. Andersson	(4	–	0)	?

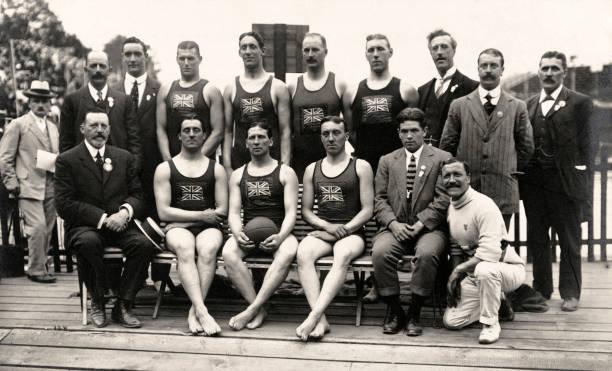
The winning British water polo team.

=== Final standings ===
Place	Nation
1	Great Britain
2	Sweden
3	Belgium
4	Austria Rudolf Buchfelder; Richard Manuel; Walter Schachlitz; Otto Scheff; Josef Wagner; Ernst Kovács; Hermann Buchfelder
5	Hungary Sándor Ádám; László Beleznai; Tibor Fazekas; Jenő Hégner; Károly Rémi; János Wenk; Imre Zachár
6	France Gustave Prouvost; Gaston Van Laere; Georges Rigal; Paul Beulque; Jean Thorailler; Henri Decoin; Paul Vasseur; Jean Rodier

== Sources ==
- PDF documents in the LA84 Foundation Digital Library:
  - Official Report of the 1912 Olympic Games (download, archive) (pp. 1021–1024, 1031–1037)
- Water polo on the Olympedia website
  - Water polo at the 1912 Summer Olympics (men's tournament)
- Water polo on the Sports Reference website
  - Water polo at the 1912 Summer Games (men's tournament) (archived)
