= Water polo at the 1920 Summer Olympics =

Men's water polo at the Games of the VII Olympiad
- Venue: Stade Nautique d'Antwerp
- Dates: 22–29 August
- Competitors: 101 from 12 nations

Medalists
1st place, gold medalist(s)		Great Britain; Great Britain
2nd place, silver medalist(s)		Belgium; Belgium
3rd place, bronze medalist(s)		Sweden; Sweden

Final results for the water polo tournament at the 1920 Summer Olympics. All medals were decided by using the Bergvall system.

== Medal summary ==
Gold	Silver	Bronze
Great Britain; Charles Sydney Smith; Paul Radmilovic; Charles Bugbee; Noel Purcell; Christopher Jones; William Peacock; William Henry Dean	Belgium; Albert Durant; Gérard Blitz; Maurice Blitz; Joseph Pletinckx; Paul Gailly; Pierre Nijs; René Bauwens; Pierre Dewin	Sweden; Harald Julin; Robert Andersson; Vilhelm Andersson; Erik Bergqvist; Max Gumpel; Pontus Hanson; Erik Andersson; Nils Backlund; Theodor Nauman; Torsten Kumfeldt (Note: This competitor is missing from the IOC medal database but is shown by Wudarski/de Wael/Mallon/Kamper. He probably played two matches.)

== Results ==
=== Gold medal round ===
Round of 12
Spain	1
Italy	1 (Note: Italy forfeited the match in extra time.)
Belgium	11
Switzerland	0
Sweden	11
Czechoslovakia	0
Brazil	5
France	1

Quarterfinals
Great Britain	9
Spain	0
United States	7
Greece	0
Belgium	2
Netherlands	1
Sweden	7
Brazil	3

Semifinals
Great Britain	7
United States	2
Belgium	5
Sweden	3

Final
Great Britain (gold)	3
Belgium	2

=== Silver medal round ===
Semifinals		Final
United States	5
Spain	0	United States	2
		Belgium (silver)	7

=== Bronze medal round ===
Quarterfinals
Netherlands	7
Czechoslovakia	0
Greece	5
Italy	1

Semifinals
Sweden	9
Netherlands	1
United States	7
Greece	0

Final
Sweden (bronze)	5
United States	0

== Sources ==
- PDF documents in the LA84 Foundation Digital Library:
  - Official Report of the 1920 Olympic Games (download, archive) (p. 130)
- Water polo on the Olympedia website
  - Water polo at the 1920 Summer Olympics (men's tournament)
- Water polo on the Sports Reference website
  - Water polo at the 1920 Summer Games (men's tournament) (archived)
