= Joan Dix =

English figure skater

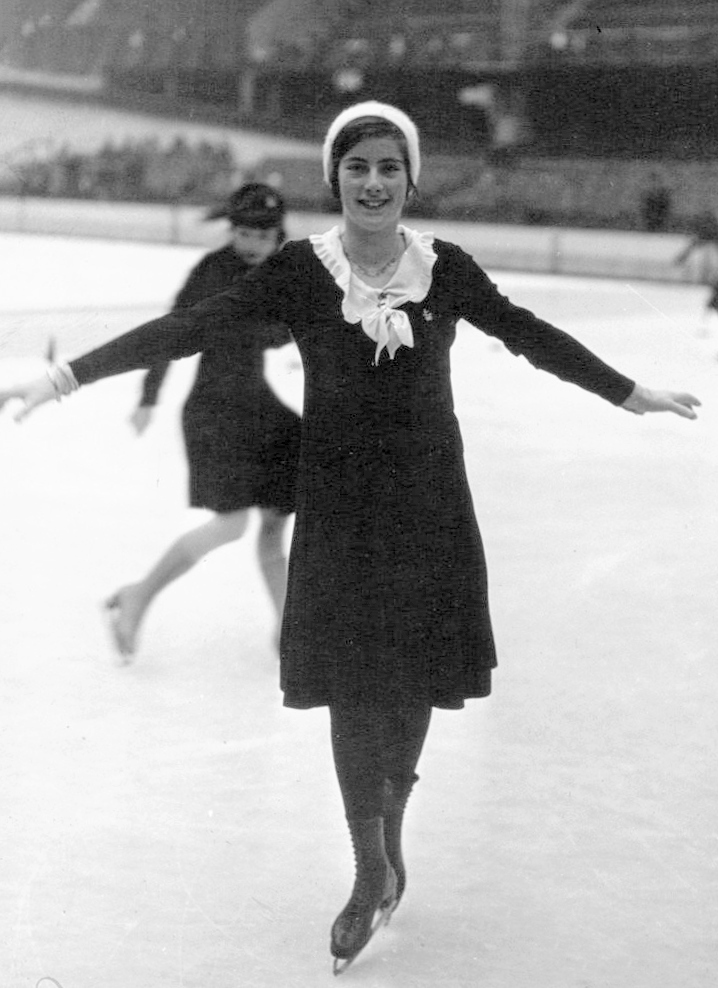
- Joan Dix at the 1932 European Championships

Personal information
- Born: 3 August 1918 Raunds, Northamptonshire, England
- Died: 1991 (aged c. 73) Brisbane, Queensland, Australia

Sport
- Sport: Figure skating

Joan Dix (later Jones, 3 August 1918 – 1991) was an English figure skater who competed in ladies singles. In 1932 she finished tenth at the Winter Olympics and world championships, and seventh at the European championships. Her father Fred Dix was an Olympic speed skater.
