= Belgium men's national water polo team =

Men's national water polo team representing Belgium

Belgium
- FINA code: BEL
- Association: Royal Belgian Swimming Federation
- Confederation: LEN (Europe)

Olympic Games (team statistics)
- Appearances: 11 (first in 1900)
- Best result: (silver) (1900, 1908, 1920, 1924)

The Belgium men's national water polo team is the representative for Belgium in international men's water polo. The team has participated in eleven tournaments at the Summer Olympics.

== Results ==
=== Olympic Games ===
- 1900 — (silver) Silver medal
- 1908 — (silver) Silver medal
- 1912 — (bronze) Bronze medal
- 1920 — (silver) Silver medal
- 1924 — (silver) Silver medal
- 1928 — 6th place
- 1936 — (bronze) Bronze medal
- 1948 — 4th place
- 1952 — 6th place
- 1960 — 16th place
- 1964 — 7th place

== See also ==
- Belgium men's Olympic water polo team records and statistics
