= Swimming at the 1900 Summer Olympics – Men's 4000 metre freestyle =

Men's 4000 metre freestyle at the Games of the II Olympiad
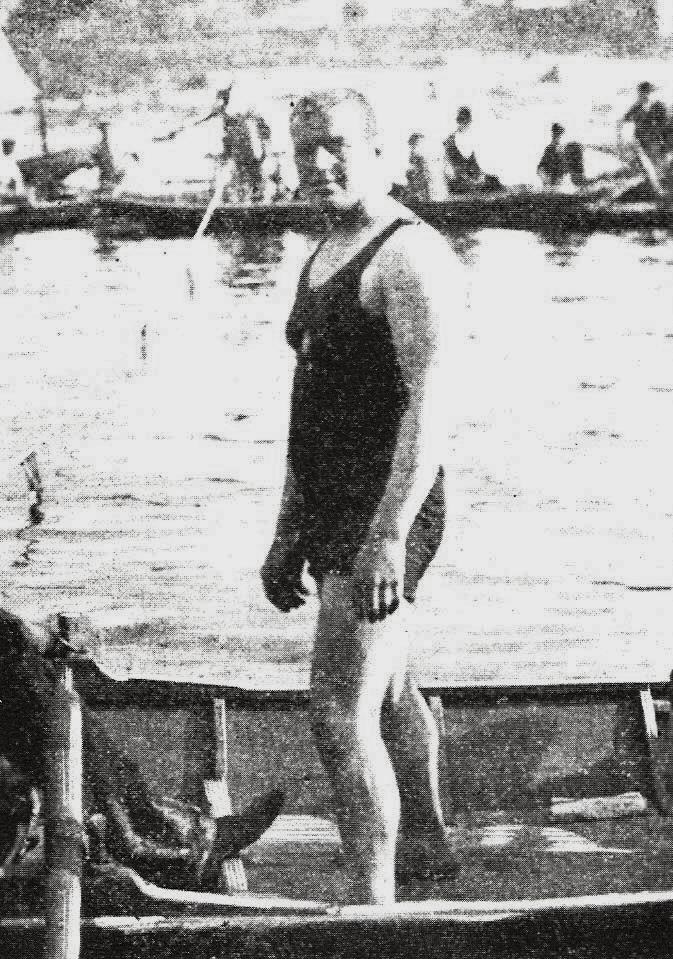
- Gold medalist John Arthur Jarvis
- Venue: River Seine
- Dates: August 15 (semifinals); August 19 (final)
- Competitors: 29 from 7 nations
- Winning time: 58:24.0 OR

Medalists
1st place, gold medalist(s)		John Arthur Jarvis; Great Britain
2nd place, silver medalist(s)		Zoltán Halmay; Hungary
3rd place, bronze medalist(s)		Louis Martin; France

The men's 4000 metre freestyle was an event on the Swimming at the 1900 Summer Olympics schedule in Paris. It was the longest of the three freestyle events. It was held on 15 August and 19 August 1900. 29 swimmers from 7 nations competed. The event was won by John Arthur Jarvis of Great Britain, completing a double with the 1000 metre freestyle. Zoltán Halmay of Hungary took silver, with Louis Martin of France earning bronze.

Jarvis swam using the front crawl; Halmay used the Trudgen stroke.

== Background ==
The 4000 metre freestyle event was held only once, and was the longest Olympic swimming event until the 10 kilometre open water event was introduced in 2008.

John Arthur Jarvis was the dominant long distance swimmer of the time and a heavy favourite in this event. He was in the midst of a run of British titles in the 880 yard (1898–1901), mile (1897–1902) and long-distance (1898–1904).

== Competition format ==
The competition used a two-round format, with semifinals and a final. The entrants were divided into three semifinals; each semifinal had between 9 and 11 swimmers. The fastest swimmer in each semifinal advanced to the final along with the next six fastest times overall. This resulted in a 9-swimmer final.

The races were swum downstream in the Seine.

== Schedule ==
Date	Time	Round
Thursday, 15 August 1900	7:30	Semifinals
Monday, 19 August 1900	15:30	Final

== Results ==
=== Semifinals ===
In the first round, there were three semifinals. The winner of each semifinal advanced to the final, as did the six fastest losers from across all the semifinals. The semifinals were held on 15 August.

==== Semifinal 1 ====
Rank	Swimmer	Nation	Time	Notes
1	John Arthur Jarvis	Great Britain	1:01:48.4	Q, OR
2	Bill Burgess	Great Britain	1:15:04.8	q
3	Louis Martin	France	1:22:29.6	q
4	Alois Anderlé	Austria	1:26:25.6	q
5	Lagarde	France	1:38:31.8	
6	de Romand	France	1:50:36.4	
7	Fumouze	France	2:02:27.0	
—	Hermand	Belgium	DNF	
—	Georges Leuillieux	France	DNF	

==== Semifinal 2 ====
Rank	Swimmer	Nation	Time	Notes
1	Zoltán Halmay	Hungary	1:11:33.4	Q
2	Eduard Meijer	Netherlands	1:17:55.4	q
3	William Henry	Great Britain	1:22:58.4	q
4	Texier	France	1:31:02.8	
5	Kobierski	France	1:37:10.4	
6	Lué	France	1:46:40.4	
—	L. Baudoin	France	DNF	
—	Gallais	France	DNF	
—	Landrich	France	DNF	

==== Semifinal 3 ====
Rank	Swimmer	Nation	Time	Notes
1	Fabio Maioni	Italy	1:25:16.6	Q
2	Ernest Martin	France	1:28:32.6	q
3	Louis Laufray	France	1:35:03.2	
4	Mortier	France	1:40:16.8	
—	Jules Clévenot	France	DNF	
—	Pierre Gellé	France	DNF	
—	Heyberger	France	DNF	
—	E. T. Jones	Great Britain	DNF	
—	Loppé	France	DNF	
—	Regnault	France	DNF	
—	Vallée	France	DNF	

=== Final ===
The final was held on 19 August. Jarvis won easily, more than ten minutes ahead of Halmay.

Rank	Swimmer	Nation	Time	Notes
1st place, gold medalist(s)	John Arthur Jarvis	Great Britain	58:24.0	OR
2nd place, silver medalist(s)	Zoltán Halmay	Hungary	1:08:55.4	
3rd place, bronze medalist(s)	Louis Martin	France	1:13:08.4	
4	Bill Burgess	Great Britain	1:15:07.6	
5	Eduard Meijer	Netherlands	1:16:37.2	
6	Fabio Maioni	Italy	1:18:25.4	
7	Ernest Martin	France	1:26:32.2	
—	Alois Anderlé	Austria	DNF	
—	William Henry	Great Britain	DNF	

== Results summary ==
Rank	Swimmer	Nation	Semifinals	Final	Notes
1st place, gold medalist(s)	John Arthur Jarvis	Great Britain	1:01:48.4	58:24.0	OR
2nd place, silver medalist(s)	Zoltán Halmay	Hungary	1:11:33.4	1:08:55.4	
3rd place, bronze medalist(s)	Louis Martin	France	1:22:29.6	1:13:08.4	
4	Bill Burgess	Great Britain	1:15:04.8	1:15:07.6	
5	Eduard Meijer	Netherlands	1:17:55.4	1:16:37.2	
6	Fabio Maioni	Italy	1:25:16.6	1:18:25.4	
7	Ernest Martin	France	1:28:32.6	1:26:32.2	
8	Alois Anderlé	Austria	1:26:25.6	DNF	
8	William Henry	Great Britain	1:22:58.4	DNF	
10	Texier	France	1:31:02.8	Did not advance	
11	Louis Laufray	France	1:35:03.2	Did not advance	
12	Kobierski	France	1:37:10.4	Did not advance	
13	Lagarde	France	1:38:31.8	Did not advance	
14	Mortier	France	1:40:16.8	Did not advance	
15	Lué	France	1:46:40.4	Did not advance	
16	de Romand	France	1:50:36.4	Did not advance	
17	Fumouze	France	2:02:27.0	Did not advance	
—	L. Baudoin	France	DNF	Did not advance	
—	Jules Clévenot	France	DNF	Did not advance	
—	Gallais	France	DNF	Did not advance	
—	Pierre Gellé	France	DNF	Did not advance	
—	Heyberger	France	DNF	Did not advance	
—	Hermand	Belgium	DNF	Did not advance	
—	E. T. Jones	Great Britain	DNF	Did not advance	
—	Landrich	France	DNF	Did not advance	
—	Georges Leuillieux	France	DNF	Did not advance	
—	Loppé	France	DNF	Did not advance	
—	Regnault	France	DNF	Did not advance	
—	Vallée	France	DNF	Did not advance	
