= Louis Laufray =

French water polo player (1881–1970)

Personal information
- Full name: Louis Alexandre Laufray
- Born: 1 October 1881 Charenton, France
- Died: 4 February 1970 (aged 88) Champcueil, France

Sport
- Sport: Swimming
- Strokes: Freestyle
- Club: Libellule de Paris

Louis Alexandre Laufray (1 October 1881 – 4 February 1970) was a French freestyle swimmer. He competed in the men's 4000 metre freestyle event and the water polo at the 1900 Summer Olympics, winning a bronze medal in the latter.

== See also ==
- List of Olympic medalists in water polo (men)
