= Herman Donners =

Belgian water polo player

Personal information
- Born: 5 August 1888 Antwerp, Belgium
- Died: 14 May 1915 (aged 26) Calais, France

Sport
- Sport: Water polo
Medal record
Representing Belgium
Olympic Games
Silver medal – second place	1908 London	Team competition
Bronze medal – third place	1912 Stockholm	Team competition

Herman Louis Clement Donners (5 August 1888 – 14 May 1915) was a Belgian water polo player who competed in the 1908 Summer Olympics and in the 1912 Summer Olympics. He was part of the Belgian water polo team and won a silver and a bronze medal.

== Personal life and death ==
Donners was born in Antwerp, Belgium, son of Jean Henri Edmond Donners and his wife Celene Helene Joseph (nee Verspreuwen). He enlisted in the Belgian Army in 1914 and died in Calais, France, of wounds received in action during World War I in May 1915. He is buried in Antwerp.

== See also ==
- List of Olympic medalists in water polo (men)
- List of Olympians killed in World War I
