= Badminton Library =

Series of non-fiction books

Tennis, Lawn Tennis, Rackets, Fives (1890), standard trade edition, decorated brown cloth cover

The Badminton Library, called in full The Badminton Library of Sports and Pastimes, was a sporting and publishing project conceived by Longmans Green & Co. and edited by Henry Somerset, 8th Duke of Beaufort (1824–1899). Between 1885 and 1902 it developed into a series of sporting books which aimed to cover comprehensively all major sports and pastimes. The books were published in London by Longmans, Green & Co. and in Boston by Little, Brown & Co.

The series was dedicated to His Royal Highness the Prince of Wales, "one of the best and keenest sportsmen of our time".

== Editor ==
The founder of the Library, the Duke of Beaufort, acted as its overseeing editor, assisted by Alfred E. T. Watson, and chose authors who were authorities in their fields. Explaining his purpose, the Duke said:

...there is no modern encyclopaedia to which the inexperienced man, who seeks guidance in the practice of various British sports and pastimes, can turn for information".

== Description ==
The Badminton Library was originally published in twenty-eight volumes between 1885 and 1896. To these was later added Rowing & Punting (1898), superseding Boating (1888). New volumes for Athletics (1898) and Football (1899) supplemented the original Athletics and Football (1887). In 1902, the final entirely new volume, Motors and Motor-Driving, covered a new sport, and lastly there was a new edition of Cricket in 1920.

On the combining of athletics and football in a single volume, Mike Huggins says in The Victorians and Sport (2004) that it suggests "...that football's leading place was not yet assured amongst the more literate reading public."

The original volume on Cricket (1888) has sixteen chapters on topics such as 'Batting', 'Bowling', 'Fielding', and 'Umpires'. It defines the Marylebone Cricket Club as "The Parliament of Cricket" and describes the sport as "Our National Game". Allan Gibson Steel wrote the chapter on bowling.

Cycling (1887), by Viscount Bury, notes that riding the tricycle and bicycle, whether by women or by men, "is by far the most recent of all sports in the Badminton Library of Sports and Pastimes. There is none which has developed more rapidly in the last few years." It considers that "England may be looked upon as the Home of Cycling" and quotes Thomas Huxley's words to the Royal Society: "Since the time of Achilles, no improvement had added anything to the speed or strength attainable by the unassisted powers of man", commenting that a bicyclist had recently raced 146 miles in only ten hours.

Skating (1892) deals first with 'Origins and Development', 'Figure skating', and 'Recreation and Racing', noting that Holland was "the Skater's Paradise" and giving a list of racing records since the 1820s, then continues with chapters on Curling, Tobogganing, Ice-Sailing and Bandy.

Laura and Guy Waterman's Yankee Rock & Ice (2002) calls the Badminton Library "a quaint turn-of-the-century British series", while a review of the publication Collectors Guide to the Badminton Library of Sports and Pastimes says of the books:

If the series were to be issued today it might more appropriately be called Sports and Pastimes for the British Aristocrat to more accurately reflect its content.

Two useful series for purposes of comparison are the slightly later American Sportsman's Library and the Lonsdale Library of Sports, Games and Pastimes (Seeley, Service & Co.).

== Editions ==
The Badminton Library was published in three different formats:

1. The standard trade edition: octavo, bound in brown illustrated cloth.
2. The deluxe edition: octavo, bound in half blue Morocco, gilt titles to the spines and bright orange boards with a gilt coat of arms to the upper board, top page edges gilt.
3. The large paper deluxe edition: large octavo or quarto, a limited edition of only two hundred and fifty copies, also bound in half blue Morocco and much the same in appearance as the deluxe edition.

== Name ==
The name 'Badminton Library' was derived from that of Duke of Beaufort's principal country house, Badminton in Gloucestershire. There is no volume in the series on the sport of Badminton, named after the same house.

== Bibliography ==
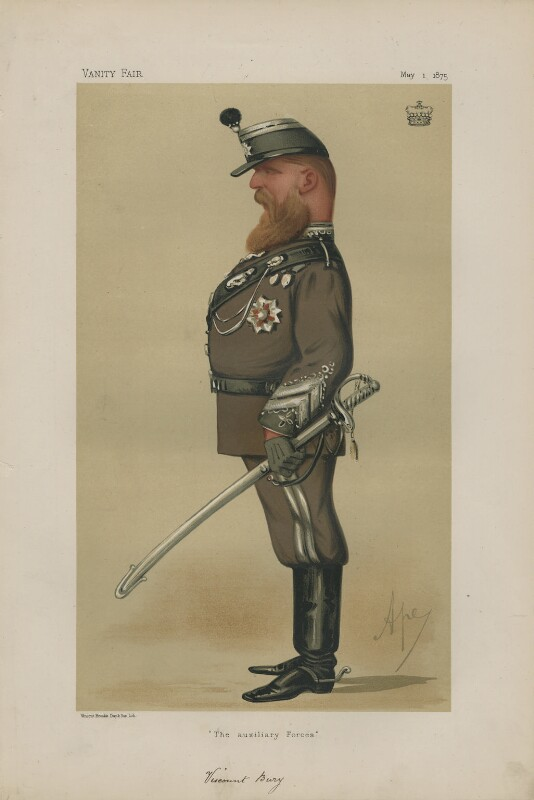
Viscount Bury, author of Cycling (1887), caricatured in 1875 by Carlo Pellegrini

- Volume 1: Hunting (1885, by the Duke of Beaufort & Mowbray Morris, with contributions by the 18th Earl of Suffolk, 11th of Berkshire, the Rev. E. W. L. Davies, Digby Collins, Alfred Watson, Sir Marteine Lloyd, George Longman and J.T. Gibbons)
- Volume 2: Fishing: Salmon & Trout (1885, 1st of 2 volumes)
- Volume 3: Fishing: Pike & Coarse Fish (1885, by H. Cholmondeley-Pennel, with contributions from other authors)
- Volume 4: Racing & Steeple-Chasing (1886, Racing by the 18th Earl of Suffolk & W. G. Craven, with a contribution by F. Lawley, Steeple-Chasing by Arthur Coventry & Alfred E. T. Watson)
- Volume 5: Shooting: Field & Covert (1886, 1st of 2 volumes)
- Volume 6: Shooting: Moor & Marsh (1886, by Thomas de Grey, 6th Baron Walsingham and Sir Ralph Payne-Gallwey)
- Volume 7: Cycling (1887, by William Coutts Keppel, Viscount Bury, later Earl of Albemarle) and George Lacy Hillier
- Volume 8: Athletics & Football (1887, by Montague Shearman)
- Volume 9: Boating (1888, by Walter Bradford Woodgate)
- Volume 10: Cricket (1888, by Allan Gibson Steel)
- Volume 11: Driving (1889, by the Duke of Beaufort)
- Volume 12: Fencing, Boxing & Wrestling (1889, Fencing by Walter H. Pollock, F. C. Grove & Camille Prevost, with a complete bibliography of the art by Egerton Castle, Boxing by E. B. Michell, Wrestling by Walter Armstrong)
- Volume 13: Golf (1890, by Horace G. Hutchinson, with a chapter on 'The Humours of Golf' by the future prime minister Arthur James Balfour and with contributions by Lord Wellwood, Andrew Lang, Sir Walter Simpson, H. S. C. Everard and others, illustrated by Harry Furniss and Thomas Hodge)
- Volume 14: Tennis, Lawn Tennis, Rackets & Fives (1890, by John Moyer Heathcote, with contributions by A. Lyttelton, W. C. Marshall, and others)
- Volume 15: Riding & Polo (1891, Riding edited by Captain Robert Weir, Polo by J. Moray Brown)
- Volume 16: Mountaineering (1892, edited by Clinton Thomas Dent)
- Volume 17: Coursing & Falconry (1892)
- Volume 18: Skating & Figure Skating (1892, by John Moyer Heathcote and Charles Goodman Tebbutt, illustrated with photographs and with wood-engravings by Charles Whymper (1853–1941) )
- Volume 19: Swimming (1893, by Archibald Sinclair and William Henry)
- Volume 20: Big Game Shooting I (1894, 1st of 2 volumes)
- Volume 21: Big Game Shooting II (1894, edited by Clive Phillipps-Wolley)
- Volume 22: Yachting I (1894, by Sir Edward Sullivan)
- Volume 23: Yachting II (1894)
- Volume 24: Archery (1894)
- Volume 25: Sea Fishing (1895)
- Volume 26: Dancing (1895, by Mrs Lilly Grove FRGS and others)
- Volume 27: Billiards (1896, edited by Major William Broadfoot)
- Volume 28: The Poetry of Sport (1896, ed. Hedley Peek)
- Volume 29: Motors & Motor-Driving (1902)
- Volume 30: Rowing & Punting (1898, Rowing by Reginald Percy Pfeiffer Rowe and Charles Murray Pitman with contributions by C. P. Serocold, F. C. Begg & S. Le B. Smith, Punting by Peter Wyatt Squire)
- Volume 31: Athletics (1898)
- Volume 32: Football (1899)
- Volume 33: Cricket (1920)

== In fiction ==
J. K. Stanford's fictional game shot George Hysteron-Proteron was said to have been educated at Eton, the Royal Military College, Sandhurst, and the Badminton Library.

== See also ==
- The Badminton Magazine of Sports and Pastimes
