= Fernand Feyaerts =

Belgian swimmer and water polo player

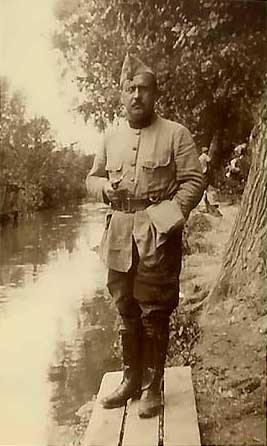

Personal information
- Born: January 25, 1882 Saint-Josse-ten-Noode, Belgium
- Died: July 11, 1927 (aged 45) Brussels, Belgium

Sport
- Sport: Swimming
Medal record
Representing Belgium
Olympic Games
Water polo
Silver medal – second place	1900 Paris	Team competition
Silver medal – second place	1908 London	Team competition

Fernand Feyearts (25 January 1882 – 11 July 1927) was a Belgian swimmer and water polo player who competed for Belgium at the 1900 Summer Olympics and the 1908 Summer Olympics, winning a silver medal in each.

Between 1898 and 1900, Feyearts was one of the main people responsible for the development of water polo in Belgium, and in 1900, his club the Brussels Swimming and Water Polo Club, traveled to Paris, France, to compete in the 1900 Summer Olympics, after beating French clubs in the first two rounds, his team met the Osbourne Swimming Club who were representing Great Britain in the final, but in front of 5000 spectators they lost 2–7, so he won a silver medal.

Feyearts was back at the Olympics eight years later competing for Belgium, at the 1908 Summer Olympics being held in London, in the first round Belgium beat the Netherlands 8–1, with Feyearts scoring six of those goals, in the next round they beat Sweden 8–4, with Feyearts scoring another point, so again they had reached the final and again they were against Great Britain, but again he had to settle for silver medal as they were beaten 2–9, Feyearts scored again and was the tournaments top scorer.

Feyearts also competed in the 100 metre freestyle at the 1908 Summer Olympics, but failed to finish in the top two, so didn't qualify for the next round.

Feyearts became a volunteer during World War I, but in 1917 he was severely wounded and ten years later died of those injuries in 1927.

== See also ==
- List of Olympic medalists in water polo (men)
