= Théo-Léo De Smet =

Belgian water polo player (1917–2000)

Personal information
- Nationality: Belgian
- Born: 9 November 1917 Antwerp, Belgium
- Died: 15 May 2000 (aged 82)

Sport
- Sport: Water polo

Théo-Léo De Smet (9 November 1917 – 15 May 2000) was a Belgian water polo player. He competed at the 1948 Summer Olympics and the 1952 Summer Olympics. Smet died on 15 May 2000, at the age of 82.

== See also ==
- Belgium men's Olympic water polo team records and statistics
- List of men's Olympic water polo tournament goalkeepers
