= Bruno De Hesselle =

Belgian water polo player

Personal information
- Nationality: Belgian
- Born: 9 September 1941 (age 83); Antwerp, Belgium

Sport
- Sport: Water polo

Bruno De Hesselle (born 9 September 1941) is a Belgian water polo player. He competed at the 1960 Summer Olympics and the 1964 Summer Olympics.

== See also ==
- Belgium men's Olympic water polo team records and statistics
- List of men's Olympic water polo tournament goalkeepers
