= Hans Aniol =

German swimmer (1878–1945)

Personal information
- Full name: Josef Karl Hans Aniol
- Born: 12 June 1878 Berlin, German Empire
- Died: 12 November 1945 (aged 67) Berlin, Allied-occupied Germany

Sport
- Sport: Swimming
- Club: Berliner Amateur Schwimm-Club

Josef Karl Hans Aniol (12 June 1878 – 12 November 1945) was a German swimmer. A member of the Berliner Swimming Club Otter (SC Otter), he competed in the men's underwater swimming event and the water polo at the 1900 Summer Olympics.

In the swimming competition, Aniol finished sixth; it was the only time the event was ever held. The water polo team that lost 2–3 to France had been put together at short notice by Georg Hax, their captain, and the team entered for the Olympics would form the basis of the future German national team.
