= Eduard Meijer =

Dutch swimmer (1878–1929)

- Meijer in 1906

Personal information
- Born: 25 February 1878 Amsterdam, Netherlands
- Died: 20 March 1929 (aged 51) Amsterdam, Netherlands

Sport
- Sport: Swimming

Eduard Meijer (25 February 1878 – 20 March 1929) was a Dutch freestyle swimmer and water polo player who competed in the 1900 Summer Olympics and 1908 Summer Olympics.

In 1900 he competed in the 4000 metre freestyle competition and finished fifth. Eight years later he participated in the 1500 metre freestyle competition, but he was eliminated in the first round. He was also part of the Dutch water polo team, which finished fourth in the 1908 tournament.

He is the older brother of Karel Meijer.
