= Thomas Thould =

British water polo player

Personal information
- Born: 11 January 1886 Weston-super-Mare, England
- Died: 15 June 1971 (aged 85) Weston-super-Mare, England

Sport
- Sport: Water polo
Medal record
Representing Great Britain
Olympic Games
Gold medal – first place	1908 London	Team competition

Thomas Henry Thould (11 January 1886 – 15 June 1971) was an English water polo player who competed in the 1908 Summer Olympics representing Great Britain. Thomas played a paramount role in the 1908 final. He was part of the British team, which won the gold medal.

== See also ==
- Great Britain men's Olympic water polo team records and statistics
- List of Olympic champions in men's water polo
- List of Olympic medalists in water polo (men)
