= Charles Treffel =

French water polo player (1875–1947)

Personal information
- Full name: Charles Lucien Treffel
- Born: 23 June 1875 Lille, France
- Died: 18 October 1947 (aged 72) Lille, France

Sport
- Sport: Water polo
Medal record
Representing France
Olympic Games
Bronze medal – third place	1900 Paris	Team competition

Charles Lucien Treffel (23 June 1875 – 18 October 1947) was a French water polo player. He competed in the men's tournament at the 1900 Summer Olympics.

== See also ==
- List of Olympic medalists in water polo (men)
