= George Wilkinson (water polo) =

British water polo player

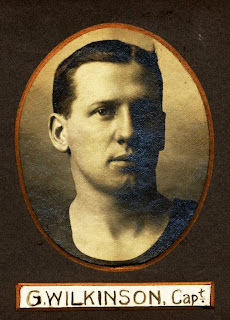
- George Wilkinson, 1904

Personal information
- National team: Great Britain
- Born: 3 March 1879 Manchester
- Died: 7 August 1946 (aged 67) Hyde, Greater Manchester

Sport
- Country: Great Britain
- Sport: Water polo
- Position: Captain (1904)
- Team: Hyde Seal team, Manchester
Medal record
Representing Great Britain
Olympic Games
Gold medal – first place	1908 London	Team competition
Gold medal – first place	1912 Stockholm	Team competition

George Wilkinson (3 March 1879 – 7 August 1946) was an English water polo player who competed at the 1908 and 1912 Summer Olympics representing Great Britain. He was in the Hyde Seal team when he won the Olympics. Hyde Seal are a Manchester team. He was part of the British water polo team and won two gold medals. The International Olympic Committee credits him with a third gold medal from the 1900 Games, but this is incorrect as he was in England during the tournament.

== See also ==
- Great Britain men's Olympic water polo team records and statistics
- List of Olympic champions in men's water polo
- List of Olympic medalists in water polo (men)
- List of members of the International Swimming Hall of Fame
