= Albert Michant =

Belgian water polo player

Personal information
- Born: February 11, 1876 Etterbeek, Belgium

Sport
- Sport: Water polo
Medal record
Representing Belgium
Olympic Games
Silver medal – second place	1900 Paris	Team competition
Silver medal – second place	1908 London	Team competition

Albert Michant was a Belgian water polo player and won silver medals at the 1900 Summer Olympics and the 1908 Summer Olympics.

== See also ==
- Belgium men's Olympic water polo team records and statistics
- List of Olympic medalists in water polo (men)
- List of men's Olympic water polo tournament goalkeepers
