= François Maesschalck =

Belgian water polo player

Personal information
- Nationality: Belgian
- Born: 19 October 1921; Brussels, Belgium

Sport
- Sport: Water polo

François Maesschalck (born 19 October 1921) was a Belgian water polo player. He competed in the men's tournament at the 1952 Summer Olympics.

== See also ==
- Belgium men's Olympic water polo team records and statistics
- List of men's Olympic water polo tournament goalkeepers
