= Victor Lindberg =

Water polo player

Personal information
- Born: July 26, 1875 Varoka, Colony of Fiji
- Died: April 28, 1951 (aged 75) Auckland, New Zealand

Sport
- Sport: Water polo
Medal record
Representing Great Britain
Olympic Games
Gold medal – first place	1900 Paris	Team competition

Michael Victor Alexander Lindberg (26 July 1875 – 28 April 1951) was a Fiji-born New Zealand swimmer and water polo player. He was part of the Great Britain team that won the water polo event at the 1900 Summer Olympics in Paris. He had hoped to compete in swimming at Paris, but his entry arrived too late.

Lindberg was born in Fiji to Swedish and Irish parents, who moved to New Zealand when he was young. Arriving in London shortly before the 1900 Olympic Games, he was selected by the Royal Life Saving Society to compete, and was given temporary membership of the Osborne Swimming Club of Manchester, which was representing Great Britain in the water polo event. He played in all three of the team's matches, in which they were undefeated and won the gold medal. His participation was not always well known, due to poor record keeping, and because records had his name misspelled. He is not included in the official list of the team (which includes a member who died during the Second Boer War before the Games) but subsequent research concludes that he did compete and that he should be considered a New Zealander. On this basis he is the first New Zealander to have competed at the Olympic Games and the first New Zealand Olympic champion.

Lindberg returned to New Zealand and was a farmer in South Auckland. He played rugby for Onewhero and Tuakau, and was a life member of the Pukekawa tennis club. His descendants were presented with a medal by the president of the New Zealand Olympic Committee Mike Stanley in 2014.

== See also ==
- Great Britain men's Olympic water polo team records and statistics
- List of Olympic champions in men's water polo
- List of Olympic medalists in water polo (men)
