= Oscar Grégoire =

Belgian water polo player (1877–1947)

Personal information
- Born: 26 March 1877 Ivanteyevka, Moscow Oblast, Russian Empire
- Died: 28 September 1947 (aged 70) Brussels, Belgium

Sport
- Sport: Swimming
Medal record
Representing Belgium
Olympic Games
Men's water polo
Silver medal – second place	1900 Paris	Team competition
Silver medal – second place	1908 London	Team competition
Bronze medal – third place	1912 Stockholm	Team competition

Oscar Grégoire Jr. (26 March 1877 – 28 September 1947) was a Belgian water polo player and backstroke swimmer who competed in the 1900 Summer Olympics, in the 1908 Summer Olympics, and in the 1912 Summer Olympics. He was part of the Belgian water polo team and was able to win two silver and one bronze medal. In 1908 and 1912 he also participated in the 100-metre backstroke events, but was eliminated in the first round in both.

== See also ==
- Belgium men's Olympic water polo team records and statistics
- List of Olympic medalists in water polo (men)
