= Guillaume Séron =

Belgian water polo player (1877–??)

Personal information
- Full name: Guillaume Elie Désiré Fidèle Séron
- Nationality: Belgian
- Born: 19 April 1877 Ixelles, Belgium
- Died: Unknown

Sport
- Sport: Water polo
Medal record
Representing Belgium
Men's water polo
Silver medal – second place	1900 Paris	Team competition

Guillaume Séron (born 19 April 1877) was a Belgian athlete who competed in water polo.

== Biography ==
Séron competed for the Brussels Swimming and Water Polo Club, and the team was selected to represent Belgium at the 1900 Summer Olympics in Paris, France. The team won a silver medal after losing in the final against the Osborne Swimming club, which represented Great Britain, but this came after the Belgium team had beaten two French sides in the previous rounds. The club finished second behind Great Britain (Osborne Swimming Club Manchester) and ahead of the two French teams (Libellule de Paris and the Pupilles de Neptune de Lille #2).

== See also ==
- List of Olympic medalists in water polo (men)
