= Archibald Sinclair (journalist) =

British journalist

Archibald Sinclair (11 January 1866–1922) was a British journalist who wrote primarily on sports, particularly swimming. With William Henry, he administered the Swimmer's Life Saving Society, founded in London in 1893.

Sinclair was educated at St Mark's College, Chelsea, London. He was the vice-president of the Royal Life-Saving Society and its joint Honorary-Secretary from 1891 to 1899. He was the sports editor for The Morning (a London newspaper published from 1892 to 1898) and was on the staff of The Sportsman for several years. Sinclair became sub-editor for the Referee in 1897. For many years he was an official for the Amateur Athletic Association and the Amateur Swimming Association. With William Henry, he wrote a book on swimming for the Badminton Library.

He married in 1888.
