= Georges Romer =

Belgian water polo player (1878–??)

Personal information
- Nationality: Belgian
- Born: 17 December 1878
- Died: Unknown

Sport
- Sport: Water polo

Senior clubs
- Years: Team
- –: Brussels Swimming Club
Medal record
Representing Belgium
Men's water polo
Silver medal – second place	1900 Paris	Team competition

Georges Romer (born 17 December 1878, date of death unknown) was a Belgian athlete whose main event was water polo.

Romas competed for the Brussels Swimming and Water Polo Club, and the team was selected to represent Belgium at the 1900 Summer Olympics in Paris, France, the team won a silver medal after losing in the final against the Osborne Swimming club which represented the Great Britain, but this came after the Belgium team had beaten two French sides in the previous rounds.

== See also ==
- List of Olympic medalists in water polo (men)
