= Eugène Coulon (water polo) =

French water polo player

Personal information
- Nationality: French
- Born: 1878
- Died: Unknown

Sport
- Sport: Water polo

Senior clubs
- Years: Team
- –: Pupilles de Neptune de Lille
Medal record
Representing France
Olympic Games
Bronze medal – third place	1900 Paris	Team competition

Eugène Coulon (born 1878, date of death unknown) was a French male water polo player. He was a member of the Pupilles de Neptune de Lille water polo team. He won with the team the bronze medal at the 1900 Summer Olympics.

== See also ==
- List of Olympic medalists in water polo (men)
