= George Nevinson =

British water polo player

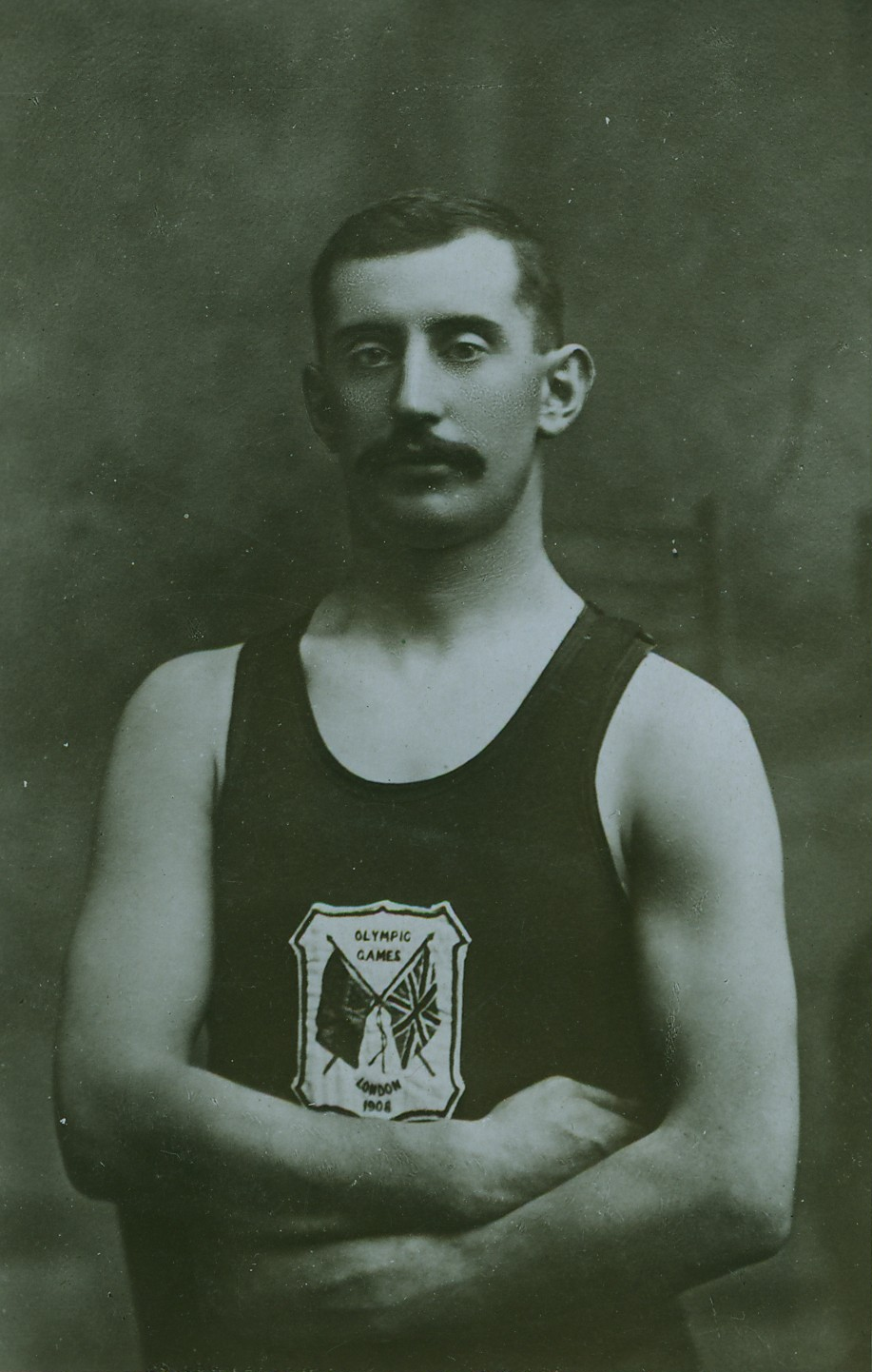

Personal information
- Born: October 3, 1882 Wigan, England
- Died: March 13, 1963 (aged 80) Lancaster, England
Medal record
Representing Great Britain
Olympic Games
Gold medal – first place	1908 London	Team competition

George Wilfred Nevinson (3 October 1882 – 13 March 1963) was a British water polo player who competed in the 1908 Summer Olympics. He was part of the British team, which was able to win the gold medal.

== See also ==
- Great Britain men's Olympic water polo team records and statistics
- List of Olympic champions in men's water polo
- List of Olympic medalists in water polo (men)
