= Herman Meyboom =

Belgian water polo player

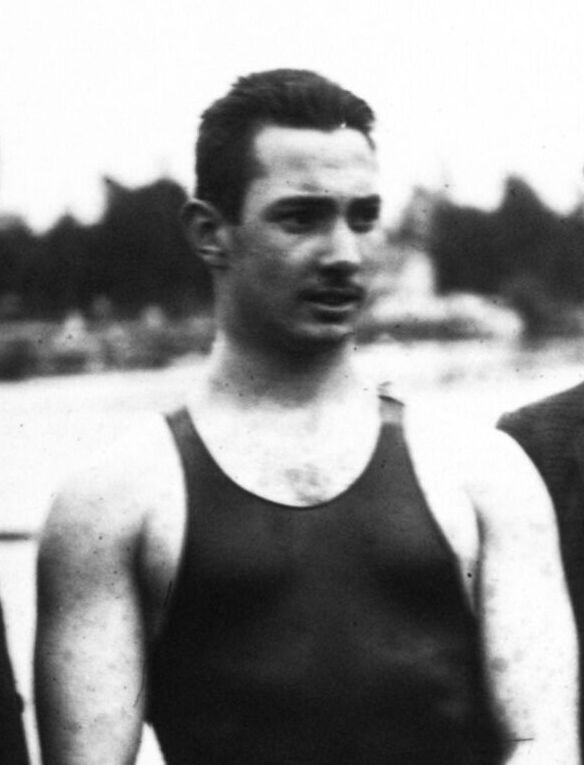
- Herman Meyboom in 1908

Personal information
- Born: August 23, 1889 Surabaya, Dutch East Indies
- Died: 1912 (aged 22–23)

Sport
- Sport: Swimming
Medal record
Representing Belgium
Olympic Games
Men's water polo
Silver medal – second place	1908 London	Team competition
Bronze medal – third place	1912 Stockholm	Team competition

Herman Meyboom (23 August 1889, in Surabaya – after 1912) was a Belgian water polo player and freestyle swimmer who competed in the 1908 and 1912 Summer Olympics.

Meyboom is the youngest male Olympic silver medalist in water polo. On 22 July 1908, he won an Olympic silver medal at the age of 18 years and 334 days.

In 1908 and 1912 he also participated in the 100-metre freestyle events, but was eliminated in the first round in each.

== See also ==
- List of Olympic medalists in water polo (men)
