= Jules Brandeleer =

Belgian water polo player

Jean Brandeleer
Personal information
- Full name: Jean Emile François Brandeleer
- Nationality: Belgian
- Born: 21 February 1905 Saint-Gilles, Belgium

Sport
- Sport: Water polo

Jean Brandeleer (21 February 1905–unknown) was a Belgian water polo player who competed in the men's tournament at the 1928 Summer Olympics.

== See also ==
- Belgium men's Olympic water polo team records and statistics
- List of men's Olympic water polo tournament goalkeepers
