= Paul Vasseur =

French water polo player (1884–1971)

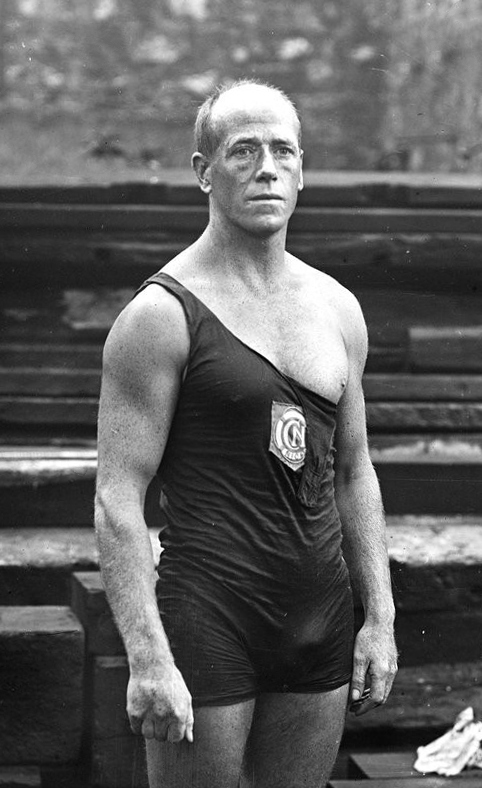
- Paul Vasseur in 1920

Personal information
- Full name: Paul Henri Vasseur
- Born: 10 October 1884 Lille, France
- Died: 12 October 1971 (aged 87) Saint-Didier, Vaucluse, France

Sport
- Sport: Water polo
- Club: Libellule de Paris; Club Nautique de Nice
Medal record
Representing France
Olympic Games
Bronze medal – third place	1900 Paris	Team

Paul Henri Vasseur (10 October 1884 – 12 October 1971) was a French freestyle swimmer and water polo player. He competed in water polo at the 1900, 1912 and 1920 Summer Olympics and finished in third, fifth and ninth place, respectively. At the 1906 and 1920 Games he took part in the 4 × 200 m, 400 m and one mile swimming events, but failed to reach the finals.

Vasseur is the youngest Olympic bronze medalist in water polo. On 12 August 1900, he won an Olympic bronze medal at the age of 15 years and 306 days.

== See also ==
- List of Olympic medalists in water polo (men)
