= George Lacy Hillier =

English racing cyclist

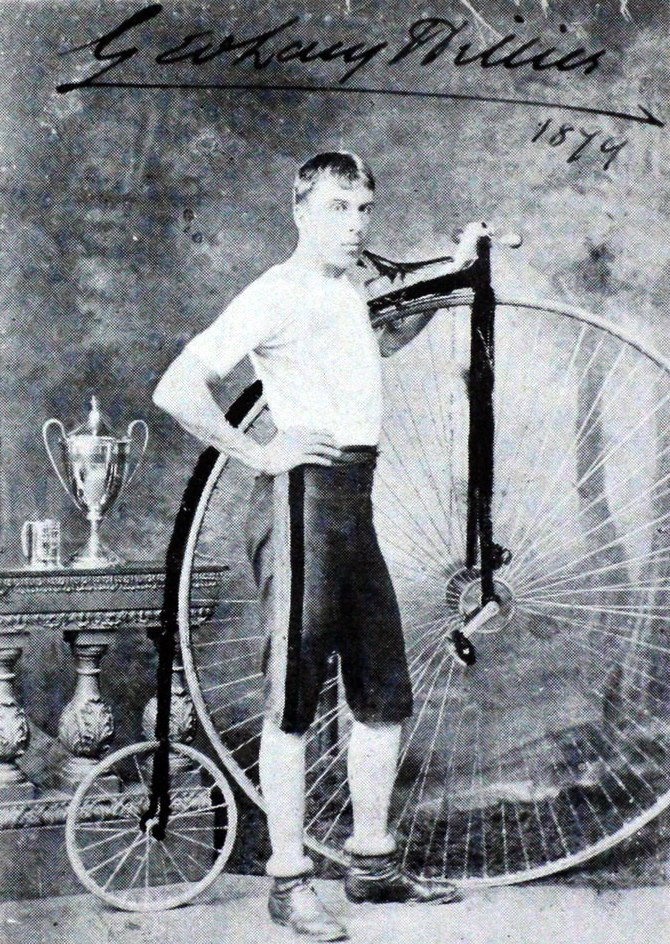
George Lacy Hillier (1879)

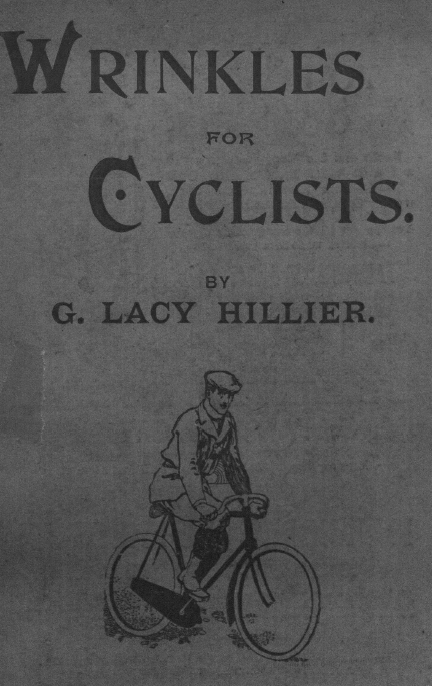
Cover of Wrinkles for Cyclists

George Lacy Hillier (6 June 1856 in Sydenham- 11 February 1941 in London) was an English racing cyclist, a pioneer of British cycling, and an excellent all-around athlete. He was one of the founders of the Chichester and District Motorcycle Club, and served as its president. He was a member of other sports clubs and was racing secretary of the London County Cycling and Athletic Club. As such, in 1891, he initiated the construction of the Herne Hill Velodrome in the south of London.

In 1881 Hillier was a national cycling champion over various distances. In 1885 he traveled to Leipzig, won a ten kilometre race against the German champion John Pundt, and set a new record on the track. For a prize, Hillier received a tape with a silver-plated cutlery and a medal.

Hillier wrote several books including the 500 page Cycling for the Badminton Library with Viscount Bury (William Keppel, later 7th Earl of Albemarle), in 1887.

In the 1892 Cyclist annual and yearbook Hillier set out a history of the cycling Hour record in which he identified Frederick Lindley Dodds of Stockton-on-Tees, who was then a student at Trinity College, Cambridge, as having set the first Hour record, on 25 March 1876, stating that "Dodds probably covered 15 miles and about 1,480 yards in the hour."

Later Hillier continued to work as a writer and journalist, as well as on the London Stock Exchange, like his father before him. His grave is located in London at the Brockley and Ladywell Cemetery.

== Writings ==
- Ease in The Art of Cycling – The Art of Train Irens for Radwettfahren with THS Walker, Berlin 1888
- Cycling, The Badminton Library, London, 1887, with Viscount Bury (William Keppel, later 7th Earl of Albemarle)
- Cycles – Past and Present, Edinburgh 1892
- All about cycling, London 1896
- Wrinkles for Cyclists, London 1898
- The Potterers Club, a cycling novel Gale and Polden Ltd. circa 1895
