= Louis Marc =

French swimmer and water polo player

Personal information
- Full name: Auguste Jean Baptiste Louis Joseph Marc
- Born: 27 July 1880 Aubers, France

Sport
- Sport: Swimming
Medal record
Representing France
Olympic Games
Bronze medal – third place	1900 Paris	Team competition

Auguste Jean Baptiste Louis Joseph Marc (27 July 1880 – 26 May 1946) was a French swimmer. He competed in two swimming events and the water polo at the 1900 Summer Olympics, winning a bronze medal in the latter.

== See also ==
- List of Olympic medalists in water polo (men)
