= Charles Forsyth =

British water polo player

Personal information
- Born: 10 January 1885 Chatham, Kent, England
- Died: 24 February 1951 (aged 66) Manchester, England

Sport
- Sport: Water polo
Medal record
Representing Great Britain
Olympic Games
Gold medal – first place	1908 London	Team competition

Charles Eric Forsyth (10 January 1885 – 24 February 1951) was a British water polo player who competed in the 1908 Summer Olympics. He was part of the British team, which was able to win the gold medal.

== See also ==
- Great Britain men's Olympic water polo team records and statistics
- List of Olympic champions in men's water polo
- List of Olympic medalists in water polo (men)
