= Karel Meijer =

Dutch water polo player (1884–1967)

Personal information
- Born: 26 June 1884; Amsterdam, Netherlands
- Died: 29 December 1967 (aged 83); Amstelveen, Netherlands

Sport
- Sport: Water polo

Karel Meijer (26 June 1884 in Amsterdam – 29 December 1967 in Amstelveen) was a Dutch water polo player who competed in the 1908 Summer Olympics and in the 1920 Summer Olympics.

He was part of the Dutch water polo team, which finished fourth in the 1908 tournament. Twelve years later, he was a member of the Dutch water polo team, which finished sixth in the 1920 tournament.

He is the younger brother of Eduard Meijer.
