= Ernest Martin (swimmer) =

French swimmer and water polo player

Personal information
- Full name: Ernest Martin
- Born: 1878

Sport
- Sport: Swimming, water polo
- Club: Pupilles de Neptune de Lille

Ernest Martin (born 1878, date of death unknown) was a French freestyle swimmer and water polo player. He competed in the men's 4000 metre freestyle event and the water polo at the 1900 Summer Olympics.
