= William Henry (swimmer) =

British swimmer

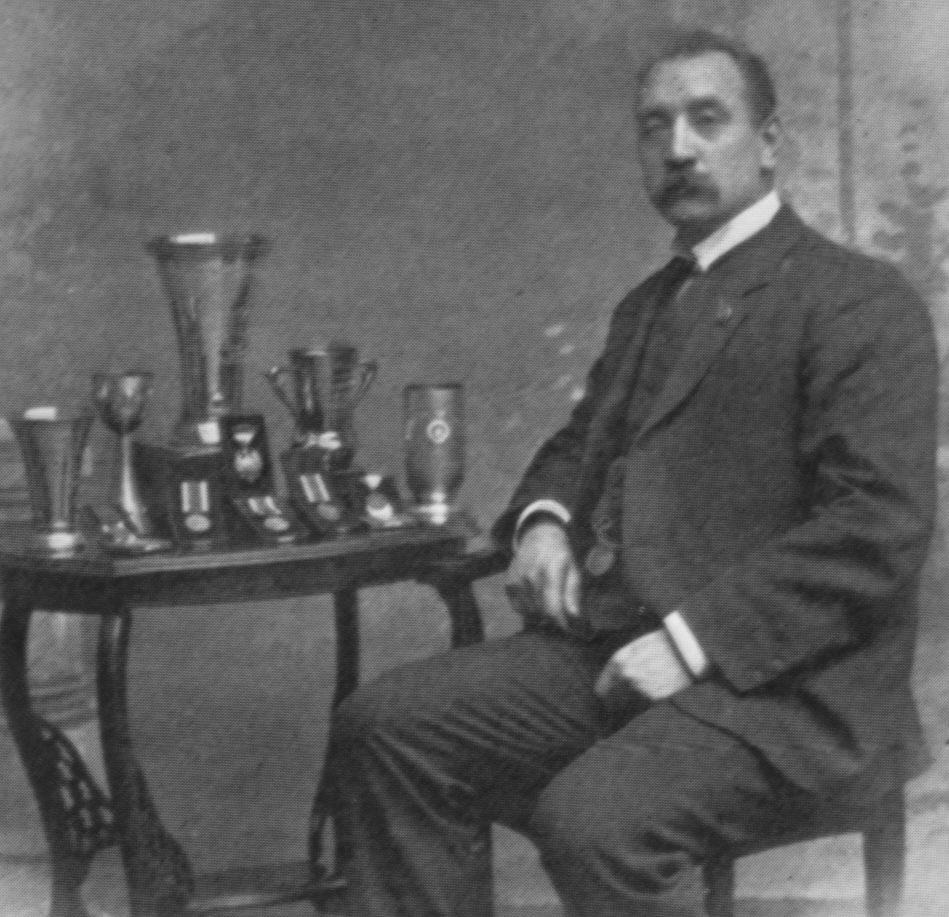

Personal information
- Full name: William Henry
- National team: Great Britain
- Born: 28 June 1859 St Pancras, London, England
- Died: 20 March 1928 (aged 68) St Pancras, London, England

Sport
- Sport: Swimming
- Strokes: Freestyle, water polo
- Club: London Leander SC
Medal record
Representing Great Britain
Men's swimming
Intercalated Games
Bronze medal – third place	1906 Athens	4×250 m freestyle
Men's water polo
Olympic Games
Gold medal – first place	1900 Paris	Team competition

William Henry (28 June 1859 – 20 March 1928), born Joseph Nawrocki, was an English competitive swimmer and lifesaver who represented Great Britain in international competition.

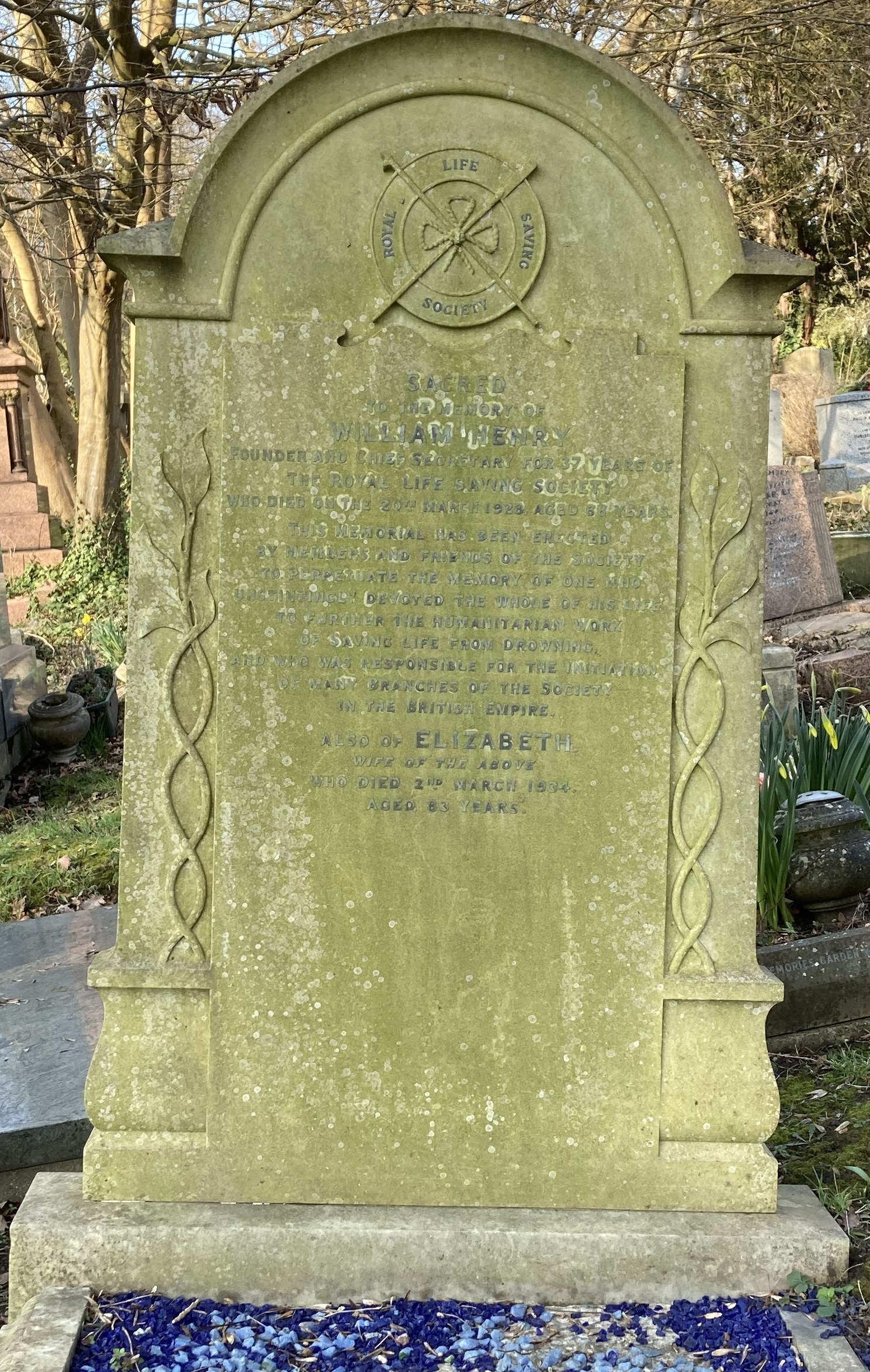
Grave of William Henry in Highgate Cemetery (east side)

== Biography ==
He was of Polish ancestry, and changed his original Polish surname Nawrocki to the English "Henry". He was a co-founder of the Royal Life Saving Society. As a swimmer he won a number of national and European championships. In 1906, at 46, he became the oldest ever Olympic medal winner in swimming as a member of the British men's 4×250-metre relay team which won the bronze medal. He won a gold medal in the 1900 Summer Olympics for Water Polo.

Henry is an International Swimming Hall of Fame inductee. He was the swimming instructor for the British royal family, using the swimming pool at the Bath Club, Dover Street. He helped to formalise the rules of water polo. With Archibald Sinclair (1866–1922), he wrote a book on swimming for the Badminton Library.

== Death ==
He died in the St Pancras district of London, aged 68. He was buried with his wife Elizabeth at Highgate Cemetery, with a memorial above the grave paid for by members and friends of the Royal Life Saving Society.

== See also ==
- Great Britain men's Olympic water polo team records and statistics
- List of Olympic medalists in swimming (men)
- List of Olympic medalists in water polo (men)
- List of Olympic champions in men's water polo
- List of men's Olympic water polo tournament goalkeepers
- List of members of the International Swimming Hall of Fame
