= Water polo at the 1900 Summer Olympics =

Men's water polo at the Games of the II Olympiad
- Venue: River Seine (near Asnières)
- Dates: August 11 (quarterfinals); August 12 (semifinals and final)
- Competitors: 58 from 5 nations

Medalists
1st place, gold medalist(s)		Osborne Swimming Club of Manchester; Great Britain
2nd place, silver medalist(s)		Brussels Swimming and Water Polo Club; Belgium
3rd place, bronze medalist(s)		Libellule de Paris; France
3rd place, bronze medalist(s)		Pupilles de Neptune de Lille; France

A water polo tournament was held on the Seine (near Asnières) on 11 and 12 August 1900 as part of the 1900 Summer Olympics. Eight teams from four countries, all European, entered the event, although only seven ended up playing. The Osborne Swimming Club of Manchester, England, which has been listed with two rosters that are nearly entirely different, became the first Olympic water polo champions by defeating the Brussels Swimming and Water Polo Club of Belgium. Third place went to the two French-based semi-finalists, Libellule de Paris and Pupilles de Neptune de Lille, the latter of whom entered two teams, but merged them together after the first round.

== Background ==
Water polo, and team sport in general, made its Olympic debut at the 1900 Summer Games held in Paris, France. The tournament was to be played by the less violent and more restrictive "English rules", which, along with the cost of traveling to Paris, deterred any American teams from participating. Seven teams, representing at least four countries, took part in the competition. Four squads were based in the host nation: two from Pupilles de Neptune de Lille and one each from Libellule de Paris and Tritons Lillois. The Brussels Swimming and Water Polo Club, Berliner Swimming Club, and Osborne Swimming Club of Manchester were based in Belgium, Germany, and Manchester, Great Britain respectively. A second squad from the Osborne Swimming Club of Manchester was entered, but did not participate.

== Team composition ==
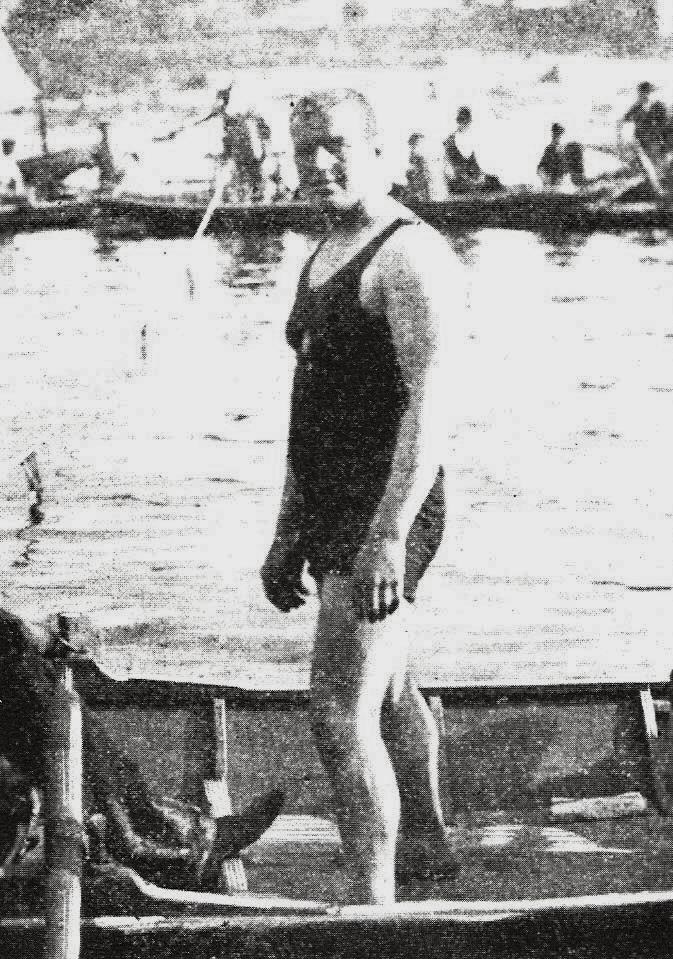
John Arthur Jarvis is listed on a roster contemporary to the Games as having competed for the Osborne Swimming Club of Manchester.

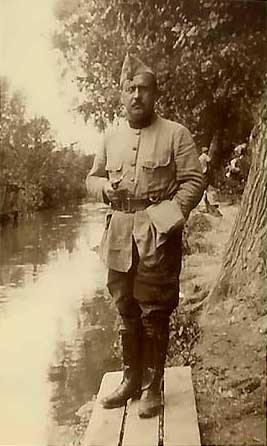
Fernand Feyaerts, pictured in 1916, was a member of the Brussels Swimming and Water Polo Club.

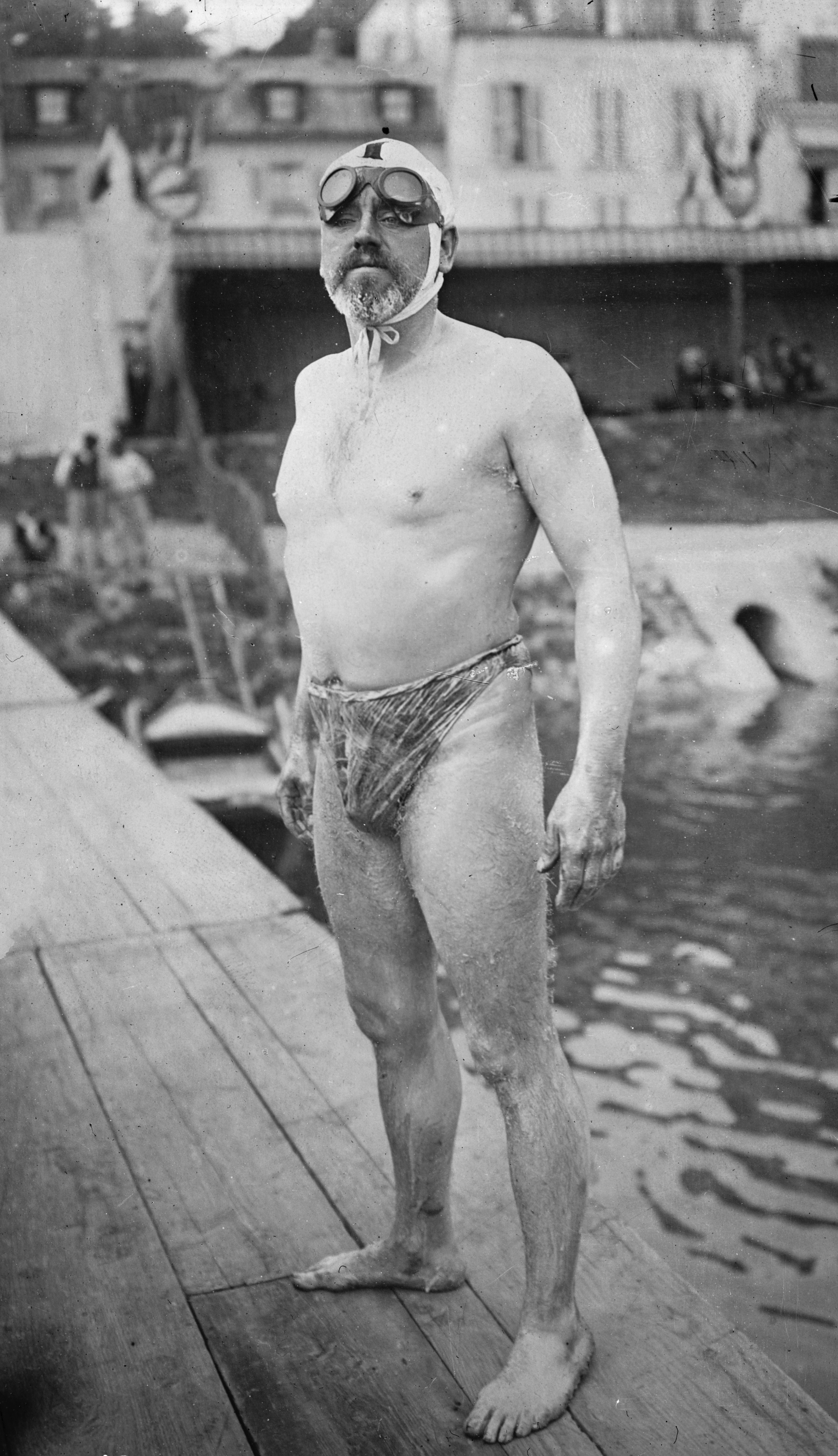
Bill Burgess, pictured in 1911, was British, but competed for the French club Libellule de Paris.

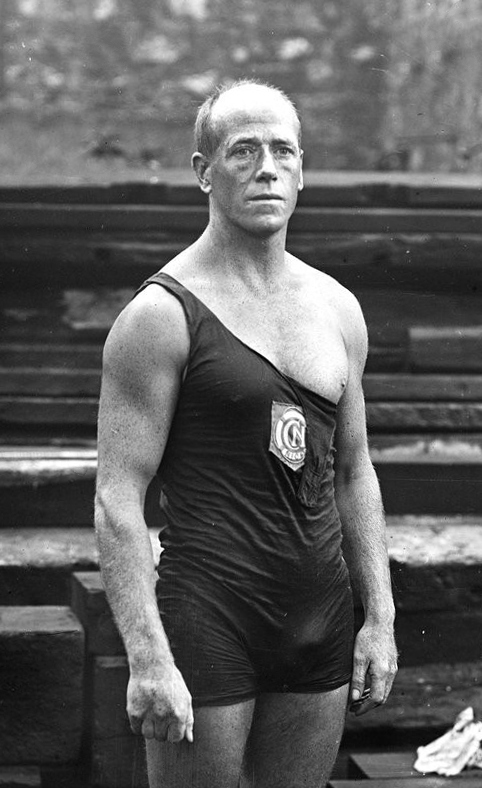
Paul Vasseur, pictured in 1920, was also on the Libellule de Paris squad.

The composition of several of the teams in Paris differs across sources and not all teams were composed solely of members who were nationals of the countries in which their clubs were based. Libellule de Paris has been listed as having a player by the name of "Devenot", but Olympic historian Bill Mallon identifies this player as Jules Clévenot, who also competed in swimming events at the Games. Their squad also included Bill Burgess, a Briton who would later become the second man to swim across the English Channel. The first Pupilles de Neptune de Lille team contained a Belgian national, Philippe Houben. Three members of this squad, Eugène Favier, René Lériche, and Charles Treffel, joined the second Pupilles de Neptune de Lille team after the first was eliminated from the tournament. They seem to have replaced four players, Auguste Camelin, Antoine Fiolet, Pierre Gellé, and Louis Marc, who competed for the second Pupilles de Neptune de Lille lineup only in the first round.

German sources do not list Hans Aniol, Max Hainle, or Herbert von Petersdorff as members of the Berliner Swimming Club, mentioning Gustav Erpf, Asmus Simonsen, and Max Schöne instead, but Mallon notes that there is proof contemporary to the tournament for the participation of only the former trio. Three members of the Brussels Swimming and Water Polo Club, Georges Romer, Guillaume Séron, and A. R. Upton, are also left off of some lists despite evidence that they participated in the first round. The roster for the Osborne Swimming Club of Manchester as listed by the International Olympic Committee is Thomas Coe, John Henry Derbyshire, Peter Kemp, William Lister, Arthur G. Robertson, Eric Robinson, and George Wilkinson. Lister, however, had died two weeks prior to the Games, while Derbyshire, Robinson, and Wilkinson all played water polo matches in England either during the tournament or too soon after it to have traveled back from Paris in time. A list of players contemporary to the match does not include Robertson, but does list Coe and Kemp in addition to Robert Crawshaw, William Henry, John Arthur Jarvis, Victor Lindberg, and Frederick Stapleton. Lindberg has been considered the first New Zealand Olympian, although he "was born in Fiji to Swedish and Irish parents, lived in New Zealand from a young age and, in Paris, represented a British club."

=== Full rosters ===
All entries are listed as per Mallon's "The 1900 Olympic Games" unless otherwise noted:

Rank	Team	Nation	Players
1st place, gold medalist(s)	Osborne Swimming Club of Manchester	Great Britain	Great Britain: Thomas Coe; Robert Crawshaw; William Henry; John Arthur Jarvis; Peter Kemp; Frederick Stapleton; New Zealand: Victor Lindberg
2nd place, silver medalist(s)	Brussels Swimming and Water Polo Club	Belgium	Jean de Backer; Victor de Behr; Henri Cohen; Fernand Feyaerts; Oscar Grégoire; Albert Michant; Georges Romer; Guillaume Séron; Victor Sonnemans; A. R. Upton
3rd place, bronze medalist(s)	Libellule de Paris	France	France: Jules Clévenot; Alphonse Decuyper; Louis Laufray; Henri Peslier; Auguste Pesloy; Paul Vasseur; Great Britain: Bill Burgess
3rd place, bronze medalist(s)	Pupilles de Neptune de Lille #2	France	Auguste Camelin; Eugène Coulon; Jean Fardelle; Antoine Fiolet; Pierre Gellé; Louis Marc; Louis Martin; Désiré Mérchez; (Eugène Favier; René Lériche; Charles Treffel)
5	Berliner Swimming Club	Germany	Hans Aniol; Paul Gebauer; Max Hainle; Georg Hax; Gustav Lexau; Herbert von Petersdorff; Fritz Scheider
5	Pupilles de Neptune de Lille #1	France	Belgium: Philippe Houben; France: Eugène Favier; René Lériche; Georges Leuillieux; Ernest Martin; René Tartara; Charles Treffel
5	Tritons Lillois	France	Joseph Bertrand; Victor Cadet; Maurice Hochepied; Jean Leclerq; Léon Tisserand; Charles Devendeville; Jules Verbecke

== Tournament results ==
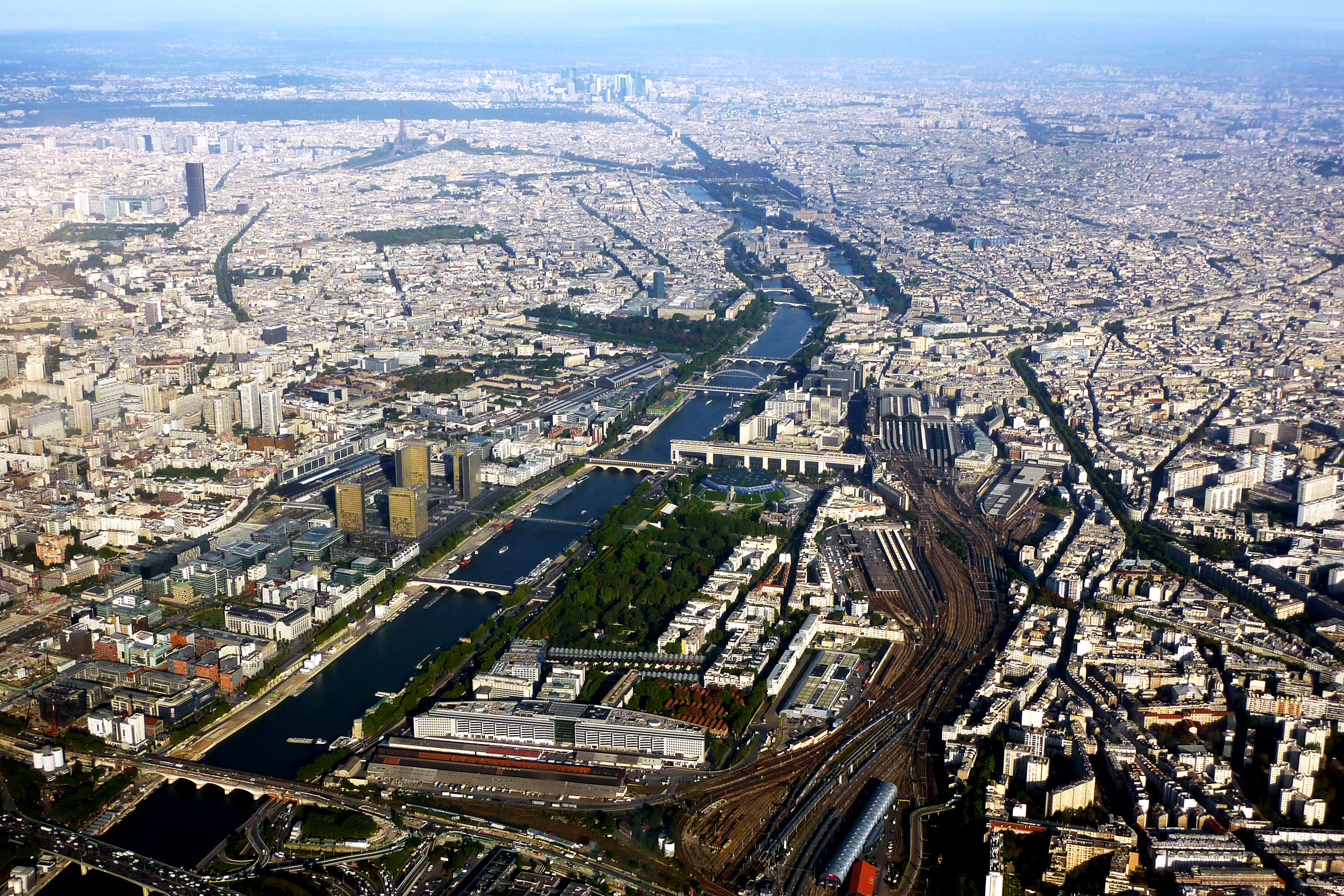
The Seine, pictured in 2010, was the venue for the water polo tournament at the 1900 Summer Olympics.

The water polo tournament was held at the river Seine, with the first round taking place on 11 August. Osborne defeated Tritons Lillois in a 12–0 shutout, with Jarvis scoring at least six of the goals. Brussels also shutout the first Pupilles de Neptune de Lille squad 2–0, while the latter's second team defeated Berliner 3–2. Libellule de Paris received a bye and the losing teams were eliminated from the tournament. The semi-finals took place on 12 August, with Osborne defeating the remaining Pupilles de Neptune de Lille squad 10–1 (with Martin scoring the lone goal for the French team) and Brussels winning against Libellule de Paris 5–1. The final was held on the same day, with Osborne overcoming Brussels 7–2. Osborne, with the medal later credited to Great Britain, became the first Olympic water polo champions and "descriptions of the matches make it appear that they won as they wished, and the margins could have been larger, had they pressed the matter". Belgium has been retroactively credited with silver (medals were not handed out for many events at the 1900 Summer Olympics), while the two French semi-finalists have been seen as the bronze medalists.

=== Summary ===
First round 11 August
Osborne Swimming Club of Manchester (GBR)	12
Tritons Lillois (FRA)	0
Pupilles de Neptune de Lille #2 (FRA)	3
Berliner Swimming Club (GER)	2
Brussels Swimming and Water Polo Club (BEL)	2
Pupilles de Neptune de Lille #1 (FRA)	0
Libellule de Paris (FRA)
Bye

Semi-finals; 12 August
Osborne Swimming Club of Manchester	10
Pupilles de Neptune de Lille #2	1
Brussels Swimming and Water Polo Club	5
Libellule de Paris	1

Finals; 12 August
Osborne Swimming Club of Manchester	7
Brussels Swimming and Water Polo Club	2

== Sources ==
- PDF documents in the LA84 Foundation Digital Library:
  - Official Report of the 1900 Olympic Games (download, archive)
- Water polo on the Olympedia website
  - Water polo at the 1900 Summer Olympics (men's tournament)
- Water polo on the Sports Reference website
  - Water polo at the 1900 Summer Games (men's tournament) (archived)
