= Water polo at the 1908 Summer Olympics =

Men's water polo at the Games of the IV Olympiad
- Dates: July 15 (quarterfinal); July 20 (semifinal); July 22 (final)
- Competitors: 28 from 4 nations

Medalists
1st place, gold medalist(s)		Great Britain
2nd place, silver medalist(s)		Belgium
3rd place, bronze medalist(s)		Sweden

At the 1908 Summer Olympics, a water polo tournament was contested.

== Medal table ==
Position	Country	Gold	Silver	Bronze	Total
1	Great Britain	1	0	0	1
2	Belgium	0	1	0	1
3	Sweden	0	0	1	1

== Medal summary ==
Gold	Silver	Bronze
Great Britain; George Cornet; Charles Forsyth; George Nevinson; Paul Radmilovic; Charles Smith; Thomas Thould; George Wilkinson	Belgium; Victor Boin; Herman Donners; Fernand Feyaerts; Oscar Grégoire; Herman Meyboom; Albert Michant; Joseph Pletinckx	Sweden; Robert Andersson; Erik Bergvall; Pontus Hanson; Harald Julin; Torsten Kumfeldt; Axel Runström; Gunnar Wennerström

== Team rosters ==
=== Belgium ===
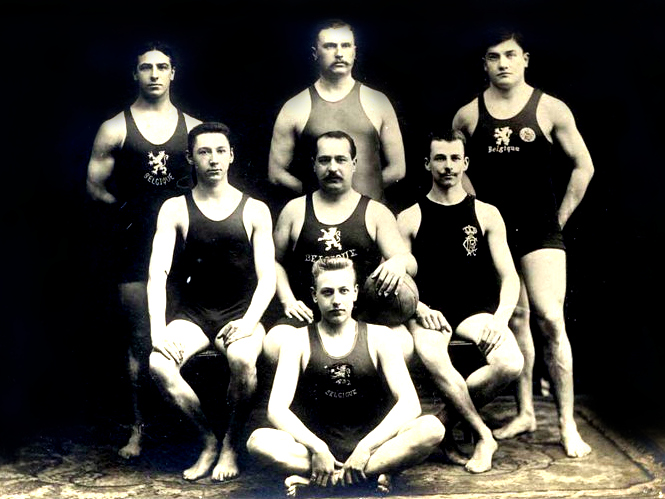
Team Belgium

- Victor Boin
- Herman Donners
- Fernand Feyaerts (captain)
- Oscar Grégoire
- Herman Meyboom
- Albert Michant (goalkeeper)
- Joseph Pletinckx

=== Great Britain ===
- George Cornet
- Charles Forsyth
- George Nevinson
- Paul Radmilovic
- Charles Sydney Smith (goalkeeper, captain)
- Thomas Thould
- George Wilkinson

=== Netherlands ===
- Bouke Benenga
- Johan Cortlever
- Jan Hulswit
- Eduard Meijer
- Karel Meijer
- Piet Ooms
- Johan Rühl (goalkeeper)

=== Sweden ===
- Robert Andersson
- Erik Bergvall
- Pontus Hanson (captain)
- Harald Julin
- Torsten Kumfeldt
- Axel Runström
- Gunnar Wennerström

== Results ==
=== Matches ===
==== First round ====
There was only one first round match, between Belgium and the Netherlands.

Great Britain, Sweden, and Austria had byes, but Austria withdrew after the draw.

Belgium	8	-	1	Netherlands
Feyaerts 6, Donners, Pletinckx	(3	-	1)	K. Meijer

==== Semi-finals ====
As Austria had withdrawn, Great Britain had a walkover to the final, with Belgium playing Sweden to determine their opponent.

Belgium	8	-	4	Sweden
Grégoire 3, Meyboom 2, Pletinckx 2, Feyaerts	(4	-	2)	Hanson 3, Andersson

==== Final ====
Great Britain's first and only match was against Belgium, who had already won two games in the tournament.

Belgium	2	-	9	Great Britain
Feyaerts, Grégoire	(2	-	5)	Wilkinson 4, Forsyth 3, Radmilovic 2

== Ranking and statistics ==
Place	Team	Played	Wins	Losses	Draws	Goals	Against	Diff.	Points
1	Great Britain	1	1	0	0	9	2	+ 7	2
2	Belgium	3	2	0	1	18	14	+ 4	4
3	Sweden	1	0	0	1	4	8	4	0
4	Netherlands	1	0	0	1	1	8	7	0

=== Scoring ===
11 players scored during the three games of the tournament, including 5 of Belgium's poloists. The Belgian captain's 8 goals led the field, and he also gained the distinctions of having scored in each of the three games as well as setting the single-game tournament high with 6 goals.

Place	Name	Nation	Goals
1	Fernand Feyaerts	Belgium	8
2	Oscar Grégoire	Belgium	4
2	George Wilkinson	Great Britain	4
4	Charles Forsyth	Great Britain	3
4	Pontus Hanson	Sweden	3
4	Joseph Pletinckx	Belgium	3
7	Herman Meyboom	Belgium	2
7	Paul Radmilovic	Great Britain	2
9	Robert Andersson	Sweden	1
9	Herman Donners	Belgium	1
9	Karel Meijer	Netherlands	1

== Sources ==
- PDF documents in the LA84 Foundation Digital Library:
  - Official Report of the 1908 Olympic Games (download, archive) (pp. 359–361)
- Water polo on the Olympedia website
  - Water polo at the 1908 Summer Olympics (men's tournament)
- Water polo on the Sports Reference website
  - Water polo at the 1908 Summer Games (men's tournament) (archived)
