= List of flag bearers for Malta at the Olympics =

Malta at the Olympics
- IOC code: MLT
- NOC: Malta Olympic Committee
- Website: www.nocmalta.org
- Medals: Gold 0 Silver 0 Bronze 0 Total 0

Summer appearances
- 1928; 1932; 1936; 1948; 1952–1956; 1960; 1964; 1968; 1972; 1976; 1980; 1984; 1988; 1992; 1996; 2000; 2004; 2008; 2012; 2016; 2020; 2024

Winter appearances
- 2014; 2018; 2022; 2026

This is a list of flag bearers who have represented Malta at the Olympics.

Flag bearers carry the national flag of their country at the opening ceremony of the Olympic Games.

== List of flag bearers ==
#	Event year	Season	Flag bearer	Sport
–	1928	Summer	Did not participate in the opening ceremony	
1	1936	Summer	Godfrey Craig	Official
2	1948	Summer	Francis X. Zammit Cutajar	Official
3	1960	Summer	Christopher Dowling	Swimming
4	1968	Summer	Louis Grasso	Official
5	1972	Summer	Joseph Grech	Shooting
6	1980	Summer	Frans Chetcuti	Shooting
7	1984	Summer	Peter Bonello	Sailing
8	1988	Summer	Joanna Agius	Archery
9	1992	Summer	Laurie Pace	Judo
10	1996	Summer	Angela Galea	Swimming
11	2000	Summer	Laurie Pace	Judo
12	2004	Summer	William Chetcuti	Shooting
13	2008	Summer	Marcon Bezzina	Judo
14	2012	Summer	William Chetcuti	Shooting
15	2014	Winter	Élise Pellegrin	Alpine skiing
16	2016	Summer	Andrew Chetcuti	Swimming
17	2018	Winter	Élise Pellegrin	Alpine skiing
18	2020	Summer	Eleanor Bezzina	Shooting
18	2020	Summer	Andrew Chetcuti	Swimming
19	2022	Winter	Jenise Spiteri	Snowboarding
20	2024	Summer	Gianluca Chetcuti	Shooting
20	2024	Summer	Sasha Gatt	Swimming

== See also ==
- Malta at the Olympics
