= Malta at the 2026 European Athletics Championships =

- WA code: MLT
- National federation: Malta Amateur Athletic Association
- Website: athleticsmalta.com

in Birmingham, United Kingdom
- Competitors: 2 (1 man and 1 woman)
- Medals: Gold 0 Silver 0 Bronze 0 Total 0

European Athletics Championships appearances
- 1958; 1962; 1966; 1969; 1971–1978; 1982; 1986; 1990; 1994; 1998; 2002; 2006; 2010; 2012; 2014; 2016; 2018; 2022; 2024; 2026

Malta competed at the 2026 European Athletics Championships in Birmingham, United Kingdom, between 10 and 16 August 2026. Two athletes (one female and one male) are sent to represent the country.

== Medals ==
Medal	Name	Event	Date

== Results ==
The following athletes are selected to compete by the Malta Amateur Athletic Association.

- including alternates

Key

- Note–Ranks given for track events are within the athlete's heat only
- Q = Qualified by place in Track Events or by standard in Field Events
- q = Qualified by time in Track Events or without standard in Field Events
- qR= Advanced to the next round by referee.
- NR = National record
- CHB = Championship best
- WL = World Leading
- PB = Personal best
- SB = Season's best
- — = Round not applicable for the event
- Bye = Athlete not required to compete in round
- DNF = Did Not Finish (Running or Race Walking Events)
- DNS = Did not start
- DQ = Disqualified
- NM = No Mark (No valid trial recorded in Field Events

Track and road events

Athlete	Event	Heat		Semifinal		Final	
Athlete	Event	Result	Rank	Result	Rank	Result	Rank
Jared Micallef	Men's 800 m	1:46.89 SB	7	Did not advance			
Claire Azzopardi	Women's 100 m	11.88	22	Did not advance			

== See also ==
- Malta at the 2026 Commonwealth Games
