= Judo at the 1988 Summer Olympics – Men's 71 kg =

Judo at the Olympics

Men's 71 kg at the Games of the XXIV Olympiad
- Venue: Jangchung Gymnasium
- Date: 27 September 1988
- Competitors: 42 from 42 nations

Medalists
1st place, gold medalist(s)		Marc Alexandre	France
2nd place, silver medalist(s)		Sven Loll	East Germany
3rd place, bronze medalist(s)		Mike Swain	United States
3rd place, bronze medalist(s)		Georgy Tenadze	Soviet Union

The men's 71 kg competition in judo at the 1988 Summer Olympics in Seoul was held on 27 September at the Jangchung Gymnasium. The gold medal was won by Marc Alexandre of France.

== Results ==
=== Pool A ===
Round of 64
Wiesław Błach (POL)	IPO
Chong Siao Chin (HKG)	E
Rony Khawam (LIB)	E
Kerrith Brown (GBR)	IPO
James Sibenge (ZIM)	E
Hugo d'Assunção (POR)	IPO
Lotuala N'Dombassy (ANG)	R
Sven Loll (GDR)	IPO
Adel Al-Najadah (KUW)	E
Glenn Beauchamp (CAN)	IPO

Round of 32
Wiesław Błach (POL)	E
Luiz Onmura (BRA)	YUK
Kerrith Brown (GBR)	KOK
Abdelhak Maach (MAR)	E
Hugo d'Assunção (POR)	YUS
Eugene McManus (IRL)	E
Henry Núñez (CRC)	E
Anders Dahlin (SWE)	KOK
Sven Loll (GDR)	IPO
Johannes Wohlwend (LIE)	R
Steffen Stranz (FRG)	IPO
Daniel Dohou Dossou (BEN)	E
Glenn Beauchamp (CAN)	IPO
Mohamed Moslih (YAR)	E
Mike Swain (USA)	WIP
Nelson Ombito (KEN)	E

Round of 16
Luiz Onmura (BRA)	E
Kerrith Brown (GBR)	SHI
Hugo d'Assunção (POR)	E
Anders Dahlin (SWE)	KOK
Sven Loll (GDR)	KOK
Steffen Stranz (FRG)	R
Glenn Beauchamp (CAN)	E
Mike Swain (USA)	YUS

Quarterfinal
Kerrith Brown (GBR)	YUS
Anders Dahlin (SWE)	E
Sven Loll (GDR)	YUK
Mike Swain (USA)	R

Semifinal
Kerrith Brown (GBR)	R
Sven Loll (GDR)	IPO

=== Pool B ===
Round of 64
Babacar Dione (SEN)	E
Bertalan Hajtós (HUN)	IPO
Jambalyn Ganbold (MGL)	E
Alpaslan Ayan (TUR)	IPO
Fredy Torres (ESA)	E
Georgy Tenadze (URS)	IPO
Xiong Fengshan (CHN)	IPO
Jason Trevisan (MLT)	E

Round of 32
Bertalan Hajtós (HUN)	IPO
Ju Hsiang-hung (TPE)	E
Marc Alexandre (FRA)	IPO
Ousmane Camara (MLI)	R
Alpaslan Ayan (TUR)	E
Ezio Gamba (ITA)	YUS
Joaquín Ruiz (ESP)	YUK
Mohamed Meridja (ALG)	E
Georgy Tenadze (URS)	SOG
Ganga Bahadur Dangol (NEP)	E
Toshihiko Koga (JPN)	KOK
Park Jeong-hui (KOR)	E
Xiong Fengshan (CHN)	E
Stewart Brain (AUS)	WAZ
Federico Vizcarra (MEX)	SHI
Angelo Ruiz (PUR)	E

Round of 16
Bertalan Hajtós (HUN)	R
Marc Alexandre (FRA)	YUS
Ezio Gamba (ITA)	E
Joaquín Ruiz (ESP)	SHI
Georgy Tenadze (URS)	YUK
Toshihiko Koga (JPN)	E
Stewart Brain (AUS)	YUK
Federico Vizcarra (MEX)	E

Quarterfinal
Marc Alexandre (FRA)	YUK
Joaquín Ruiz (ESP)	R
Georgy Tenadze (URS)	IPO
Stewart Brain (AUS)	E

Semifinal
Marc Alexandre (FRA)	KOK
Georgy Tenadze (URS)	R

=== Repechages ===
Brown won the Pool A repechage, but was later stripped of his medal after testing positive for furosemide.

Repechage
Lotuala N'Dombassy (ANG)	E
Johannes Wohlwend (LIE)	YUK

Repechage quarterfinal
Johannes Wohlwend (LIE)	E
Steffen Stranz (FRG)	IPO

Repechage semifinal
Steffen Stranz (FRG)	E
Mike Swain (USA)	YUS (bronze)

Repechage final
Mike Swain (USA)	E
Kerrith Brown (GBR)	KOK DSQ

Repechage

Repechage quarterfinal
Ousmane Camara (MLI)	E
Bertalan Hajtós (HUN)	IPO

Repechage semifinal
Bertalan Hajtós (HUN)	YUS
Joaquín Ruiz (ESP)	E

Repechage final
Bertalan Hajtós (HUN)	E
Georgy Tenadze (URS)	IPO (bronze)

=== Final ===
Final
Sven Loll (GDR)	2nd place, silver medalist(s)
Marc Alexandre (FRA)	KOK (gold)

== Final classification ==
Rank	Name	Country
1	Marc Alexandre	France
2	Sven Loll	East Germany
3T	Mike Swain	United States
3T	Georgy Tenadze	Soviet Union
5T	Bertalan Hajtós	Hungary
5T	Steffen Stranz	West Germany
7T	Joaquín Ruiz	Spain
7T	Johannes Wohlwend	Liechtenstein
9T	Lotuala N'Dombassy	Angola
9T	Ousmane Camara	Mali
11T	Anders Dahlin	Sweden
11T	Stewart Brain	Australia
13T	Luiz Onmura	Brazil
13T	Hugo d'Assunção	Portugal
13T	Federico Vizcarra	Mexico
13T	Glenn Beauchamp	Canada
13T	Toshihiko Koga	Japan
13T	Ezio Gamba	Italy
19T	Wiesław Błach	Poland
19T	Abdelhak Maach	Morocco
19T	Eugene McManus	Ireland
19T	Henry Núñez	Costa Rica
19T	Angelo Ruiz	Puerto Rico
19T	Daniel Dohou Dossou	Benin
19T	Mohamed Moslih	North Yemen
19T	Nelson Ombito	Kenya
19T	Ju Hsiang-hung	Chinese Taipei
19T	Xiong Fengshan	China
19T	Alpaslan Ayan	Turkey
19T	Mohamed Meridja	Algeria
19T	Ganga Bahadur Dangol	Nepal
19T	Park Jeong-hui	South Korea
33T	Chong Siao Chin	Hong Kong
33T	Babacar Dione	Senegal
33T	James Sibenge	Zimbabwe
33T	Jambalyn Ganbold	Mongolia
33T	Rony Khawam	Lebanon
33T	Adel Al-Najadah	Kuwait
33T	Fredy Torres	El Salvador
33T	Jason Trevisan	Malta
DQ	Kerrith Brown	Great Britain
