= Malta at the 1960 Summer Olympics =

- IOC code: MLT (MAT used at these Games)
- NOC: Malta Olympic Committee
- Website: www.nocmalta.org

in Rome
- Competitors: 10 in 4 sports
- Flag bearer: Christopher Dowling
- Medals: Gold 0 Silver 0 Bronze 0 Total 0

Summer Olympics appearances (overview)
- 1928; 1932; 1936; 1948; 1952–1956; 1960; 1964; 1968; 1972; 1976; 1980; 1984; 1988; 1992; 1996; 2000; 2004; 2008; 2012; 2016; 2020; 2024

Malta competed at the 1960 Summer Olympics in Rome, Italy. Ten competitors, all men, took part in six events in four sports. The nation returned to the Olympic Games after a 12-year absence, since 1948.

== Cycling ==
Three cyclists represented Malta in 1960.

Individual road race

- Paul Camilleri
- John Bugeja
- Joseph Polidano

Team time trial

- John Bugeja
- Paul Camilleri
- Joseph Polidano

== Shooting ==
Two shooters represented Malta in 1960.

Trap

- Wenzu Vella
- Joseph Grech

== Swimming ==
Athlete	Event	Heat		Semifinal		Final	
Athlete	Event	Result	Rank	Result	Rank	Result	Rank
Alfred Grixti	Men's 100 metre freestyle	1:07.8	50	did not advance			
Christopher Dowling	Men's 100 metre freestyle	1:08.9	51	did not advance			

== See also ==
- Malta at the 1960 Summer Paralympics
