= Malta at the 1980 Summer Olympics =

- IOC code: MLT
- NOC: Malta Olympic Committee
- Website: www.nocmalta.org

in Moscow
- Competitors: 8 (7 men, 1 woman) in 3 sports
- Flag bearer: Frans Chetcuti
- Medals: Gold 0 Silver 0 Bronze 0 Total 0

Summer Olympics appearances (overview)
- 1928; 1932; 1936; 1948; 1952–1956; 1960; 1964; 1968; 1972; 1976; 1980; 1984; 1988; 1992; 1996; 2000; 2004; 2008; 2012; 2016; 2020; 2024

Malta competed at the 1980 Summer Olympics in Moscow, USSR. Eight competitors, seven men and one woman, took part in five events in three sports.

== Archery ==
In its first archery competition at the Olympics, Malta entered one man and one woman. They finished last and second-to-last in their divisions, respectively.

Women's:

- Joanna Agius – 2119 points (28th place)

Men's:

== Cycling ==
Four cyclists represented Malta in 1980.

Individual road race

- Joseph Farrugia
- Carmel Muscat
- Alfred Tonna
- Albert Micallef

Team time trial

- Joseph Farrugia
- Albert Micallef
- Carmel Muscat
- Alfred Tonna

== See also ==
- Malta at the 1980 Summer Paralympics
