= Malta at the 2012 Summer Olympics =

- IOC code: MLT
- NOC: Malta Olympic Committee
- Website: www.nocmalta.org

in London
- Competitors: 5 in 3 sports
- Flag bearers: William Chetcuti (opening); Diane Borg (closing)
- Medals: Gold 0 Silver 0 Bronze 0 Total 0

Summer Olympics appearances (overview)
- 1928; 1932; 1936; 1948; 1952–1956; 1960; 1964; 1968; 1972; 1976; 1980; 1984; 1988; 1992; 1996; 2000; 2004; 2008; 2012; 2016; 2020; 2024; 2028

Malta competed at the 2012 Summer Olympics in London, which was held from 27 July to 12 August 2012. The country's participation at London marked its fifteenth appearance in the Summer Olympics since its début at the 1928 Summer Olympics. The delegation included two track and field athletes, Rachid Chouhal and Diane Borg, one double trap shooter William Chetcuti and two swimmers Andrew Chetcuti and Nicola Muscat. All five competitors qualified for the Games through wildcard places. William Chetcuti was selected as the flag bearer for the opening ceremony while Borg held it at the closing ceremony. Choudai did not progress beyond the preliminary stages of the men's 100 metres, while Borg advanced to the first round of the women's 100 metres before being eliminated. William Chetcuti finished ninth in the double trap shooting event, while Andrew Chetcuti and Muscat were unable to progress to the first rounds of their respective swimming disciplines.

== Background ==
Malta participated in fifteen Olympic Games between its début at the 1928 Summer Olympics in Amsterdam, Netherlands and the 2012 Summer Olympics in London, England, with the exception of 1932, 1952, 1956, 1964 and 1976. No Maltese athlete has ever won a medal at the Olympic Games. Malta participated in the Summer Olympics from 27 July to 12 August 2012. Malta sent sprinters Rachid Chouhal and Diane Borg, shooter William Chetcuti and swimmers Andrew Chetcuti and Nicola Muscat to London. As in the 2004 Summer Olympics, Chetcuti was the flag bearer for the opening ceremony while Borg held it for the closing ceremony. Along with the five athletes, the Malta Olympic team consisted of chef de mission and the country's NOC vice-president Julian Pace Bonello, director of sport and assistant Mark Cutajar, secretary general Joe Cassar and director of finance David Azzopardi. The athletes were coached by Jimmy Bugeja, Andy Colbourn and Mario Bonello, with Lucienne Attard, Adele Muscat and Milos Stanisavljevic from the Maltese NOC's medical commission attending the Games.

== Athletics ==
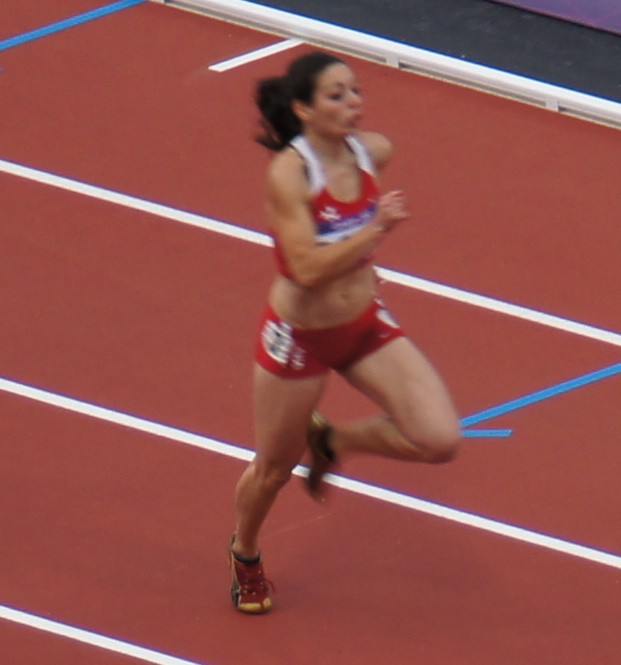
Diane Borg competing in the women's 100 metres where she was eliminated from the event's first round.

Rachid Chouhal was the oldest athlete to represent Malta at the London Games at the age of 37. He had not participated in any previous Olympic Games. Chouhal qualified for the Games via a wildcard because his fastest time of 10.83 seconds, set at the Marsa Sports Complex on 2 June 2012, was 0.59 seconds slower than the "B" qualifying standard for his event, the men's 100 metres. Before the Games Choudal said "When I want something, I go for it. I am not afraid. I am confident in my training and am careful not to get hurt. I know that the level of the athletes competing in the 100 metre sprint is very high. My aim is to do a personal best or season's best." He was drawn in the fourth heat of the preliminary round on 4 August, finishing fourth out of eight runners, with a time of 10.83 seconds. Overall Chouhal finished 58th out of 75 athletes, but did not progress to the first round because he was 0.21 seconds slower than the slowest competitor in his heat who went through to the later stages.

Competing at her first Olympic Games at the age of 21, Diane Borg carried the flag of Malta at the closing ceremony. She qualified for the London Games as a wildcard entrant, because her fastest time of 11.89 seconds, set at the 2011 Games of the Small States of Europe, was 0.51 seconds slower than the "B" qualifying standard for the women's 100 metres. She stated that it was "a great feeling" that she would be representing Malta and every person hoping that she would perform well. Borg took part in the event's second heat on 3 August, finishing third out of eight entrants, with a time of 12 seconds. Her finishing position allowed her to advance to the first round as the slowest qualifier. Borg was drawn in the second heat of the first round, held on the same day, placing eighth (and last) of all competitors, with a time of 11.92 seconds. She finished 53rd out of 78 runners overall, (Note: One athlete, Noor Hussain Al-Malki, did not finish.) and was unable to advance to the semi-finals because her time was 0.57 seconds slower than the slowest athlete who progressed to the next stage.

Key

- Note–Ranks given for track events are within the athlete's heat only
- q = Qualified for the next round as a fastest loser or, in field events, by position without achieving the qualifying target

Men

Athlete	Event	Heat		Quarterfinal		Semifinal		Final	
Athlete	Event	Result	Rank	Result	Rank	Result	Rank	Result	Rank
Rachid Chouhal	100 m	10.83	4	Did not advance					

Women

Athlete	Event	Heat		Quarterfinal		Semifinal		Final	
Athlete	Event	Result	Rank	Result	Rank	Result	Rank	Result	Rank
Diane Borg	100 m	12.00	3 q	11.92	8	Did not advance			

== Shooting ==
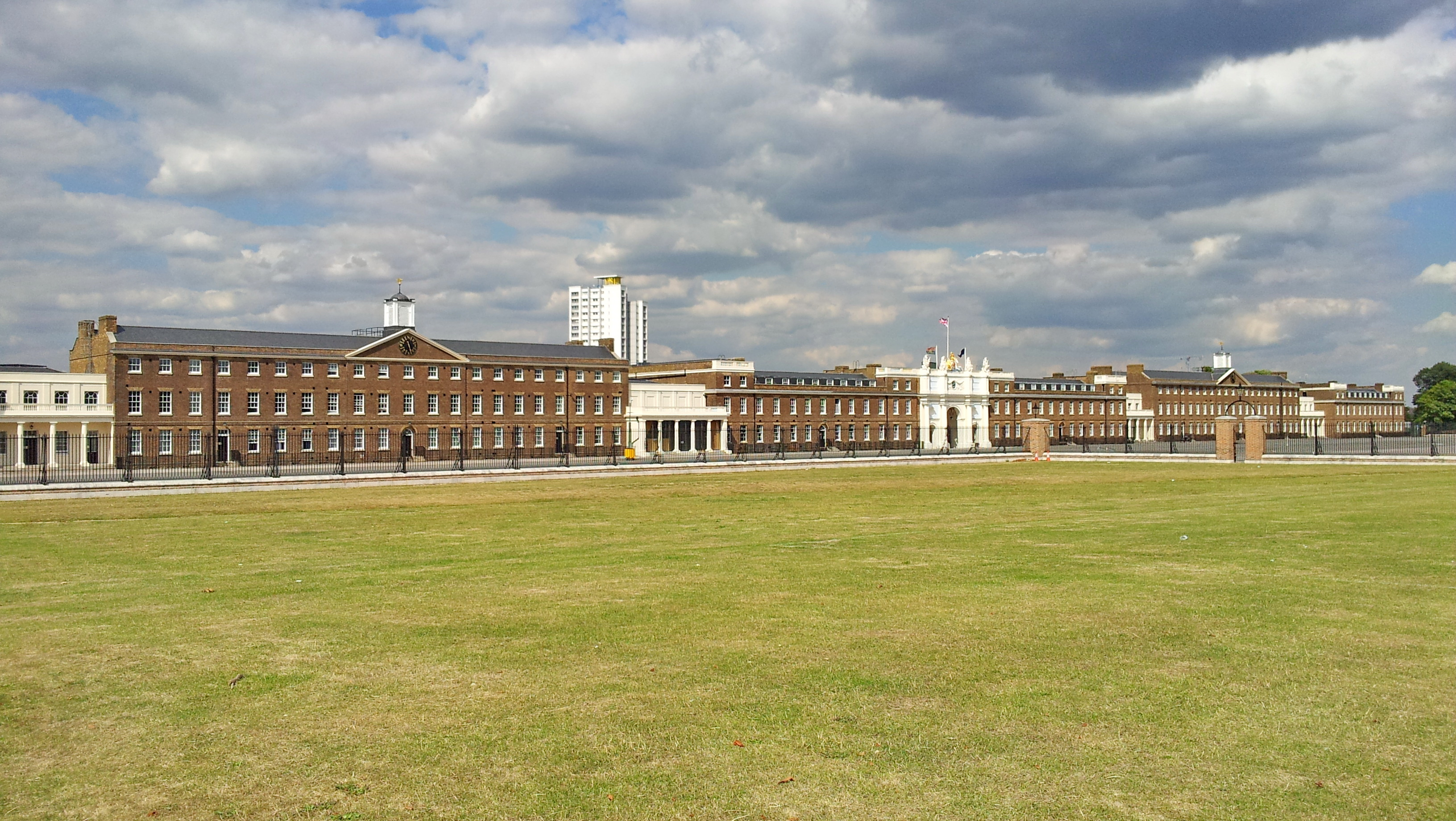
The Royal Artillery Barracks, where William Chetcuti competed in the men's double trap shooting competition.

William Checuti was the only member of the Maltese team at the London Olympics to have participated in three previous Olympic Games and was his country's sole representative in the men's double trap shooting competition. He qualified for the event by receiving a wildcard from the Tripartite Commission because of his performance at the 2011 ISSF Shotgun World Cup where he achieved a gold medal. William Chetcuti said that his objective was "to do his best" and in the event he performed well, he felt that he would be at an equivalent level to his rival competitors. On 2 August he competed in the qualification round of the men's double trap. He finished ninth out of 23 athletes, (Note: One shooter, Sergio Piñero, was unable to finish.) with a score of 135 points. William Chetcuti scored eight points less than the highest scoring competitor Peter Wilson of Great Britain. He scored two points less than Sweden's Håkan Dahlby and Richárd Bognár from Hungary who were the lowest scoring qualifiers for the final and therefore his competition ended at the qualifying round. After the Games William Chetcuti said he gave it his best but on the day he did not perform to the best of his ability. He stated that his result was influenced by missing his targets in the first and third rounds.

Men

Athlete	Event	Qualification		Final	
Athlete	Event	Score	Rank	Score	Rank
William Chetcuti	Double trap	135	9	Did not advance	

== Swimming ==
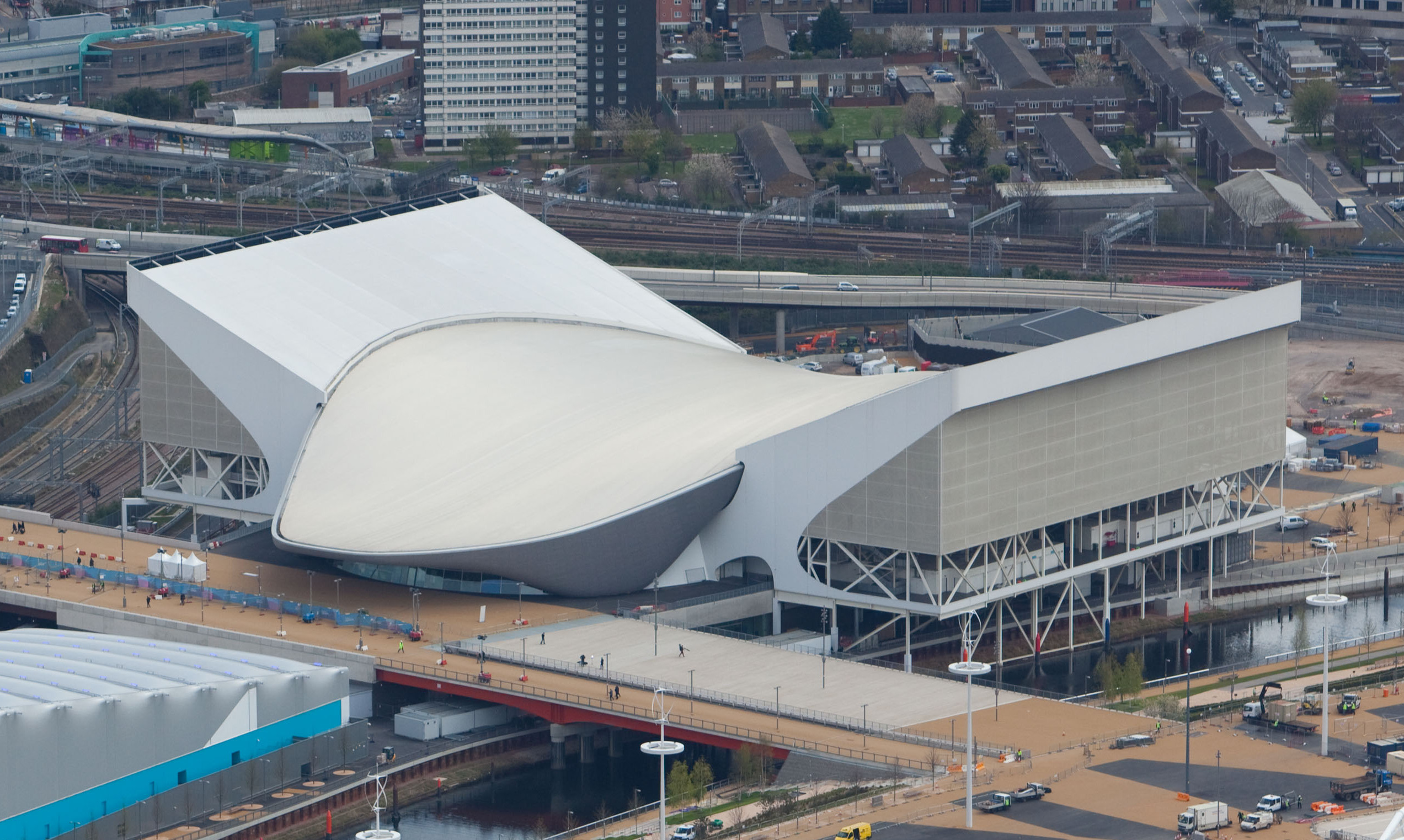
The London Aquatics Centre, where Andrew Checuti and Muscat competed in swimming events.

The 2012 London Summer Games marked Andrew Checuti's début in the quadrennial competition. He was the youngest male athlete on the national team, at age 19. Andrew Chetcuti qualified for the Games after being issued with a universality place from swimming's world governing body FINA after his fastest time of 51.98 seconds, set at the 2011 Games of the Small States of Europe, was 0.95 seconds slower "B" qualifying standard for his event, the men's 100 metre freestyle. He spent time in Dubai and South Africa preparing for the Games. Andrew Chetcuti said it would be "the best experience of my life so far" and that he would attempt to enjoy competing in the Games. The swimmer revealed that he would attempt to record a new personal best time. He participated in the third heat on 31 July, finishing third out of eight swimmers, with a time of 51.67 seconds. Andrew Chetcuti's time was a new Maltese national record. He finished 39th out of 56 competitors overall, (Note: Four swimmers did not start.) and was unable to advance beyond the first round because he was 2.68 seconds slower than the slowest athlete who progressed to the later stages. After the event Andrew Chetcuti said he was happy with the achievement but hoped to go faster.

Nicola Muscat was the youngest person to compete for Malta at the London Games at the age of 18. She had not taken part in any previous Olympic Games. Muscat qualified for the Games after receiving a wildcard from FINA because her fastest time of 26.87 seconds was 1.11 second slower than the "B" qualifying standard for her event, the women's 50 metre freestyle. Before the Games she said, "Competing at international competitions makes you learn to be realistic about winning and making achievable aims. For example, my main aim at the Olympics is to break my own national record." Muscat was drawn in the event's fifth heat on 3 August, finishing fourth out of eight athletes, with a time of 27.22 seconds. Overall she ranked 43rd out of 73 swimmers, (Note: One competitor, Eszter Dara, did not start.) and was unable to advance to the semi-finals after finishing 1.94 seconds slower than the slowest competitor who made the later stages.

Men

Athlete	Event	Heat		Semifinal		Final	
Athlete	Event	Time	Rank	Time	Rank	Time	Rank
Andrew Chetcuti	100 m freestyle	51.67	39	Did not advance			

Women

Athlete	Event	Heat		Semifinal		Final	
Athlete	Event	Time	Rank	Time	Rank	Time	Rank
Nicola Muscat	50 m freestyle	27.22	43	Did not advance			

== See also ==
- Malta at the 2012 Summer Paralympics
