= Malta at the 2018 European Athletics Championships =

- WA code: MLT
- National federation: MAAA
- Website: www.athleticsmalta.com

in Berlin
- Competitors: 2

European Athletics Championships appearances
- 1958; 1962; 1966; 1969; 1971–1978; 1982; 1986; 1990; 1994; 1998; 2002; 2006; 2010; 2012; 2014; 2016; 2018; 2022; 2024

Malta competed at the 2018 European Athletics Championships in Berlin, Germany, from 6–12 August 2018. A delegation of 2 athletes were sent to represent the country.

The following athletes were selected to compete by the Malta Amateur Athletic Association.

Men
Field events

Athletes	Event	Qualification		Final	
Athletes	Event	Distance	Position	Distance	Position
Ian Paul Grech	Long jump	7.04 m	29	did not advance	

Women
Track and road

Athletes	Event	Heats		Semifinal		Final	
Athletes	Event	Result	Rank	Result	Rank	Result	Rank
Charlotte Wingfield	200 metres	24.40	24	did not advance			
