= Malta at the 2008 Summer Olympics =

- IOC code: MLT
- NOC: Malta Olympic Committee
- Website: www.nocmalta.org

in Beijing
- Competitors: 6 in 4 sports
- Flag bearers: Marcon Bezzina (opening); Ryan Gambin (closing)
- Medals: Gold 0 Silver 0 Bronze 0 Total 0

Summer Olympics appearances (overview)
- 1928; 1932; 1936; 1948; 1952–1956; 1960; 1964; 1968; 1972; 1976; 1980; 1984; 1988; 1992; 1996; 2000; 2004; 2008; 2012; 2016; 2020; 2024; 2028

Malta competed at the 2008 Summer Olympics in Beijing, China from 8 to 24 August 2008. The country's participation at Beijing marked its fourteenth appearance at a Summer Olympics since its début at the 1928 Summer Olympics. The delegation sent by the Malta Olympic Committee consisted of six athletes: sprinters Nikolai Portelli and Charlene Attard, light-middleweight judoka Marcon Bezzina, double trap shooter William Chetcuti and short-distance swimmers Ryan Gambin and Madeleine Scerri.

Five of the six athletes qualified for the Games by using wildcards while Gambin was the only person to attain qualification for his sport by setting a time that met the necessary requirements at the 2008 European Aquatics Championships. All six competitors failed to progress any farther than the first round of their respective events though Chetcuti pushed his qualification stage into a four-man shoot-out which he lost.

== Background ==
Malta participated in fourteen Olympic Games between its début at the 1928 Summer Olympics in Amsterdam, Netherlands and the 2008 Beijing Olympics, with the exception of the 1932, 1952, 1956, 1964 and 1976 Games. The highest number of athletes sent by Malta to a summer games is eleven to the 1936 Olympics in Berlin, Germany. No Maltese athlete has ever medalled at the Olympic Games. Malta took part in the Beijing Summer Olympics from 8 to 24 August 2008. The six athletes selected to represent Malta in Beijing were sprinters Nikolai Portelli and Charlene Attard, light-middleweight judoka Marcon Bezzina, double trap shooter William Chetcuti and short-distance swimmers Ryan Gambin and Madeleine Scerri. Bezzina was chosen as the flag bearer for the opening ceremony, while Gambin carried the flag of Malta at the closing ceremony.

The team was publicly revealed by The Malta Independent on 6 July, and later confirmed by the Malta Olympic Committee two days later. The Malta Olympic Committee factored in preparation and their rivals' competitiveness during the selection process. Along with the six athletes, the nation's Olympic team was led by Lino Farrugia Sacco, the committee's president, and secretary general Joe Cassar. It also consisted of chef de mission and vice-president of the committee Julian Pace Bonello. He was assisted by Marie Therese Zammit. They were accompanied by the committee's director of finance David Azzopardi. The athletes were coached by Leandros Calleja, Gail Rizzo, Jurgen Klinger and Jimmy Bugeja with Lucianne Attard from the committee's medical commission appointed as the team's doctor.

== Athletics ==
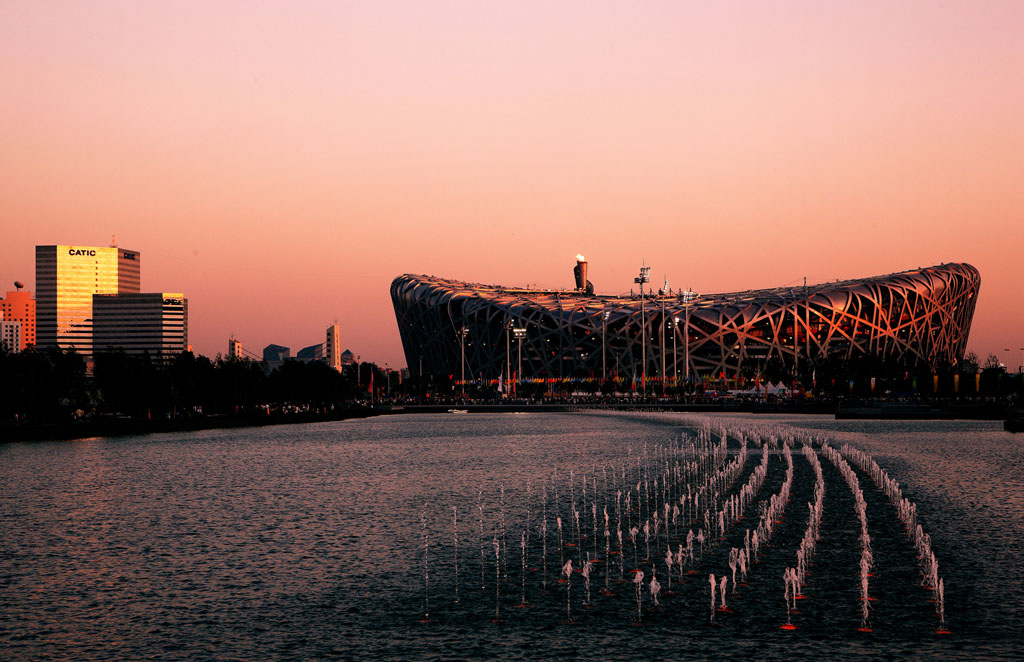
The Beijing National Stadium, where Portelli and Attard competed in athletics events.

Nikolai Portelli was the oldest athlete to represent Malta at the Beijing Olympics at the age of 26. He had not participated in any previous Olympic Games. He qualified for the Olympics by using a wildcard because his personal best time of 22.11 seconds was 1.36 seconds slower than the "B" qualifying standard for the men's 200 metres. Before the games Portelli said that attending the Olympic Games was a personal dream for himself and revealed that he would make the most from the opportunity and aimed to perform to the best of his ability. He was drawn in the fourth heat on 17 August, finishing eighth (and last) out of all athletes, with a time of 22.31 seconds. Portelli finished 60th (equal with Oleg Juravlyov from Uzbekistan) out of 62 runners overall. (Note: Three athletes did not finish and one failed to start.) He did not progress to the second round because his time was 1.44 seconds slower than the slowest athlete who made the later stages.

Competing in her first Summer Olympics at the age of 21, Charlene Attard was Malta's sole female representative in athletics. She qualified for the Games via a wildcard because her quickest time of 11.93 seconds was 0.51 seconds slower than the "B" qualifying standard for the women's 100 metres. In an interview with the Times of Malta before the Olympics, Attard said she was looking forward to débuting at the Games. She revealed her preparations went untroubled and set herself the target of improving the national 100 metres record time. Attard participated in the tenth heat on 16 August, finishing sixth out of nine competitors, with a time of 12.20 seconds. Overall she placed 57th out of 85 participants and failed to advance beyond the first round after being 0.79 seconds behind the slowest runner in her heat who made the next stage.

Key

- Note–Ranks given for track events are within the athlete's heat only
- NR = National record

Men

Athlete	Event	Heat		Quarterfinal		Semifinal		Final	
Athlete	Event	Result	Rank	Result	Rank	Result	Rank	Result	Rank
Nicolai Portelli	200 m	22.31	8	Did not advance					

Women

Athlete	Event	Heat		Quarterfinal		Semifinal		Final	
Athlete	Event	Result	Rank	Result	Rank	Result	Rank	Result	Rank
Charlene Attard	100 m	12.20	9	Did not advance					

== Judo ==
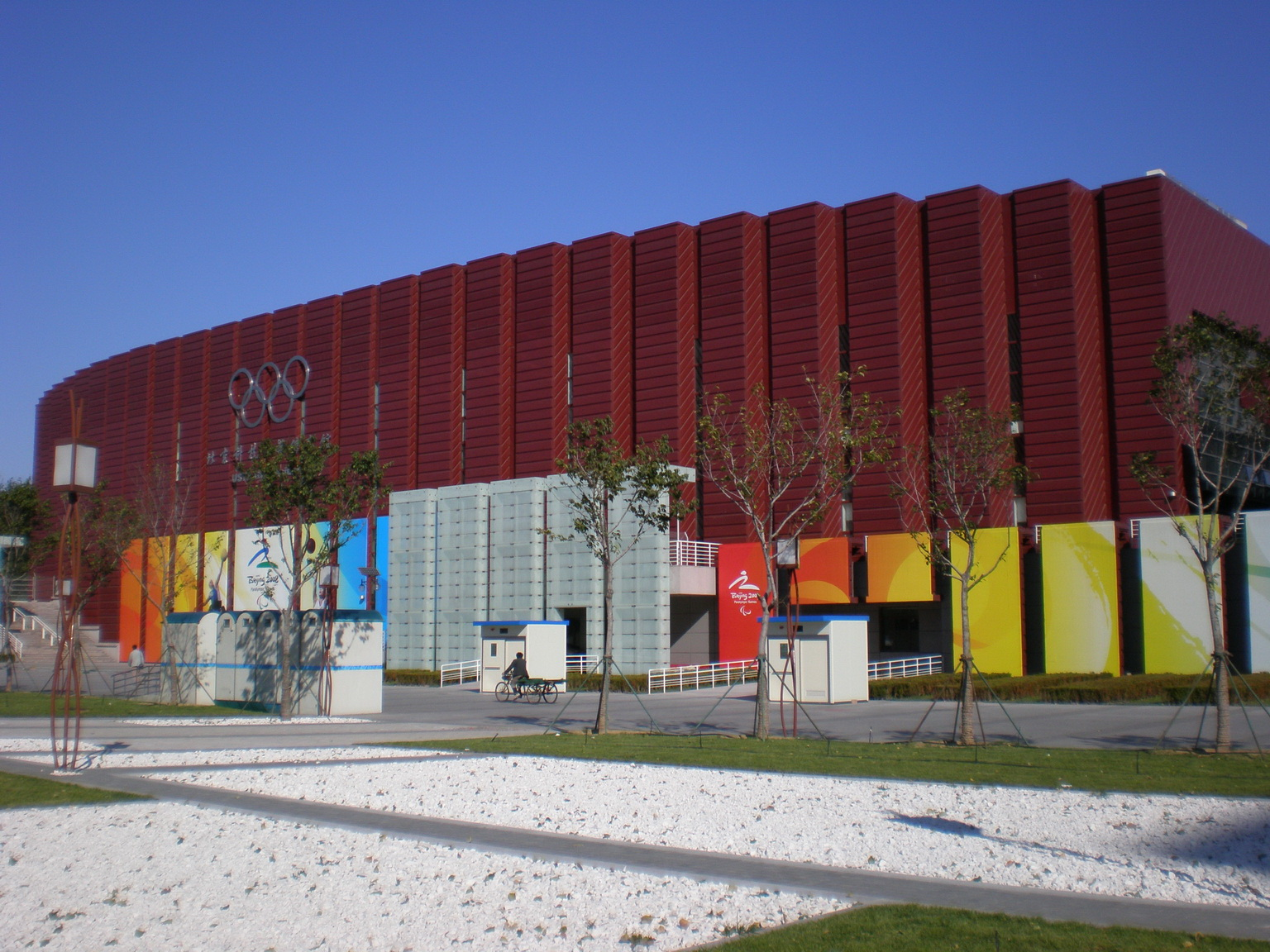
Bezzina competed as a judoka at the Beijing Science and Technology University Gymnasium.

The 2008 Summer Olympics marked 22 year old Marcon Bezzina's second appearance at the Olympic Games after she previously represented Malta at the 2004 Summer Olympics. She received an invitation from the International Judo Federation to compete in the women's light middleweight (−63 kg) tournament. Bezzina prepared for the Beijing Games by competing in multiple international tournaments and attending several training camps. She was drawn to compete against Algeria's Kahina Saidi at the Beijing Science and Technology University Gymnasium on 12 August. Bezzina lost her match when Saidi performed a Waza-ari throw on her. She was not permitted to enter the repechage bracket because Saidi lost her next two bouts and this rendered these additional matches unnecessary to stage.

Women

Athlete	Event	Round of 32	Round of 16	Quarterfinals	Semifinals	Repechage 1	Repechage 2	Repechage 3	Final / BM	
Athlete	Event	Opposition Result	Opposition Result	Opposition Result	Opposition Result	Opposition Result	Opposition Result	Opposition Result	Opposition Result	Rank
Marcon Bezzina	Women's −63 kg	Saidi (ALG); L 0000–0200	Did not advance							

== Shooting ==
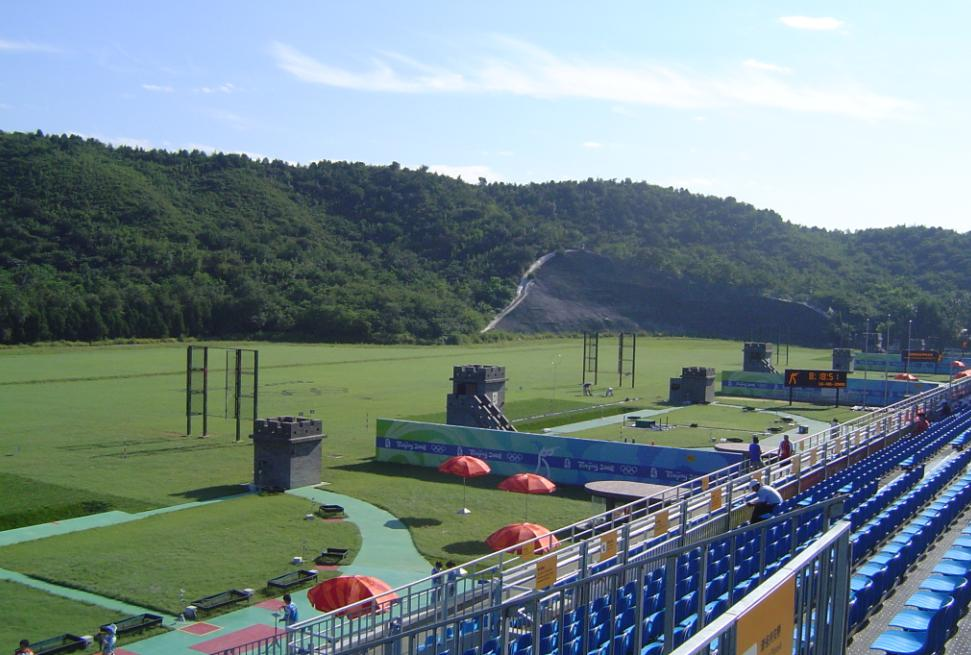
Chetcuti took part in the men's double trap shooting contest at the Beijing Shooting Range Clay Target Field.

23 year old William Chetcuti made his second appearance at a Summer Olympics having previously competed for Malta at the 2004 Athens Games. He qualified for the men's double trap shooting contest after receiving a wild card from the Tripartite Commission. Entering the Olympics Chetcuti spoke of his dream of winning a gold medal and noted the strong competition he would face, "I have competed with these guys many times at similar high-level competitions, so I know I stand a good chance. The key ingredients to success are a lot of practice, a natural ability and good hand-eye coordination. Shooting is all about being quick and alert." On 12 August he competed in the qualification round of his event. Chetcuti finished eighth out of nineteen shooters with a score of 136 points. He subsequently entered into a four-way shoot-out between Australia's Russell Mark, the United Arab Emirates' Ahmed Al-Maktoum and Hungary's Roland Gerebics for a place in the final because all four competitors were tied on 136 points. Chetcuti lost the shoot-out and therefore his competition ended at the qualification round.

Men

Athlete	Event	Qualification		Final	
Athlete	Event	Points	Rank	Points	Rank
William Chetcuti	Double trap	136	8	Did not advance	

== Swimming ==
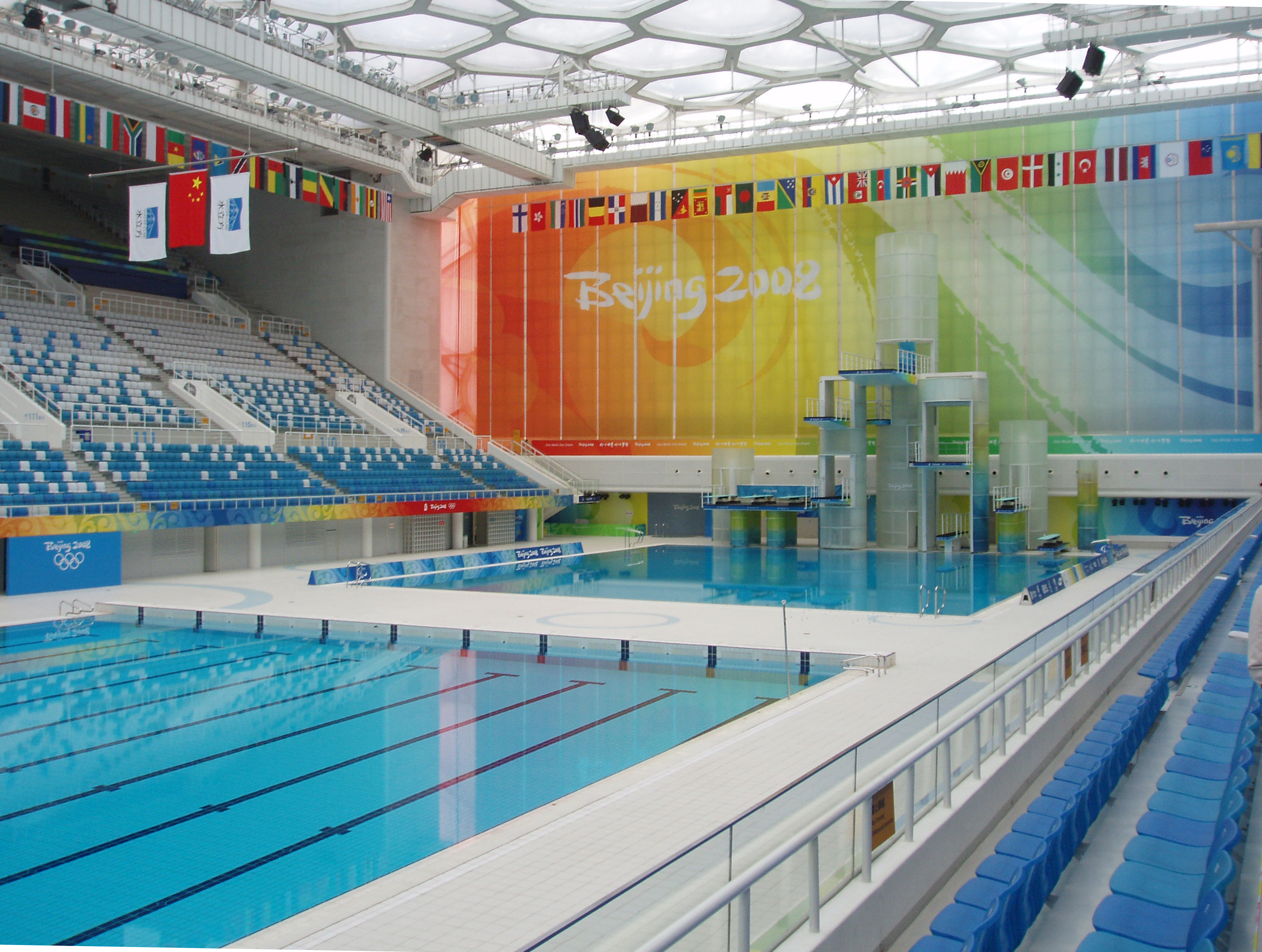
The Beijing National Aquatics Centre, where Gambin and Scerri took part in swimming contests.

The 2008 Summer Olympics marked Australian-born Ryan Gambin's Olympic debut. He qualified for the Beijing Olympics by going 0.38 seconds faster than the "B" (FINA/Invitation) qualifying standard for the men's 100 metres butterfly competition with a time of 54.33 seconds at the 2008 European Aquatics Championships in Eindhoven. Gambin said that competing in Swimming competition at the Olympics was the fulfilment of his childhood ambitions and he aimed to reach the semi-finals of his event, "Whenever the going gets difficult, I remind myself of why I'm doing it. I think of my goals and I relate it back to how it is going to feel in a race. That usually pulls me through the tough sets." He was drawn in the fourth heat on 14 August, finishing sixth out of eighth athletes, with a time of 53.70 seconds. Gambin's time established a new Maltese national record and a new personal best. Overall he came 48th out of 66 swimmers, (Note: One swimmer, Mattia Nalesso, failed to start.) and did not progress into the semi-finals because he was 1.65 seconds slower than the slowest competitor who advanced to the next stage.

Australian-born Madeleine Scerri also made her Olympic debut at the 2008 Games. She qualified for the Games by using a wildcard to enter the women's 100 metre freestyle event after her personal best time of 58.11 seconds set at a contest in Australia did not meet the "B" (FINA/Invitation) qualifying standard for the event. Scerri spoke of her excitement over competing in the Olympics and on behalf of Malta, "It will be amazing to watch a lot of my idols compete and to see first-hand the highest quality of sport that is on offer. There is so much to learn about competing at the highest level. There are going to be some amazing competitions and races, and just being there will be so fantastic." She was drawn to swim in the first heat which she won over Elena Popovska of Macedonia and Olga Hachatryan of Turkmenistan with a new national and personal best time of 57.97 seconds. However she did not advance into the semi-finals because her effort put her 45th overall and she was 3.27 seconds slower than the slowest athlete who progressed to the later stages of the competition. (Note: One swimmer, Caitlin McClatchey, did not start.)

Men

Athlete	Event	Heat		Semifinal		Final	
Athlete	Event	Time	Rank	Time	Rank	Time	Rank
Ryan Gambin	100 m butterfly	53.70 NR	48	Did not advance			

Women

Athlete	Event	Heat		Semifinal		Final	
Athlete	Event	Time	Rank	Time	Rank	Time	Rank
Madeleine Scerri	100 m freestyle	57.97 NR	45	Did not advance			

== See also ==
- Malta at the 2008 Summer Paralympics
