= Malta at the 2000 Summer Olympics =

- IOC code: MLT
- NOC: Malta Olympic Committee
- Website: www.nocmalta.org

in Sydney
- Competitors: 7 in 5 sports
- Flag bearer: Laurie Pace
- Medals: Gold 0 Silver 0 Bronze 0 Total 0

Summer Olympics appearances (overview)
- 1928; 1932; 1936; 1948; 1952–1956; 1960; 1964; 1968; 1972; 1976; 1980; 1984; 1988; 1992; 1996; 2000; 2004; 2008; 2012; 2016; 2020; 2024

Malta was represented at the 2000 Summer Olympics in Sydney, Australia by the Malta Olympic Committee.

In total, seven athletes represented Malta in five different sports including athletics, judo, sailing, shooting and swimming.

== Athletics ==
Two Maltese athletes participated in the athletic events – Mario Bonello in the men's 100 m and Suzanne Spiteri in the women's 100 m.

The heats for the men's 100m took place on 22 September 2000. Bonello contested heat one which took place at 11:35 am. He finished ninth in a time of 11.06 seconds and failed to advance to the semi-finals.

The heats for the women's 100m took place on 22 September 2000. Spiteri contested heat six which took place at 1:35 pm. She finished seventh in a time of 12.57 seconds and failed to advance to the semi-finals.

== Judo ==
One Maltese athlete participated in the judo events – Laurie Pace in the women's –57 kg.

The women's –57 kg took place on 18 September 2000. Pace lost by ippon to Barbara Harel of France in the round of 32.

== Sailing ==
One Maltese athlete participated in the sailing events – Mario Aquilina in the open single-person laser.

The open single-person laser took place from 20–29 September 2000. Aquilina contested all 11 races but only managed one top 10 finish. He amassed a total of 272 points and finished the competition in 37th overall.

== Shooting ==
One Maltese athlete participated in the shooting events – Frans Pace in the men's trap.

The preliminary round for the men's trap took place on 16–17 September 2000. Pace scored 106 points across the five rounds to finish tied for 32nd overall.

== Swimming ==
Two Maltese athletes participated in the swimming events – John Tabone in the men's 400 metre individual medley and Angela Galea in the women's 100 metre butterfly.

The heats for the women's 100 m butterfly took place on 16 September 2000 at 4:18 pm. Galea contested heat one and started in lane three. She finished first in her heat in a time of 1 minute 7.08 seconds which was ultimately not fast enough to qualify for the semi-finals.

The heats for the men's 400 m individual medley took place a day later on 17 September 2000 at 5:32 pm. Tabone contested heat one and started in lane two. He finished fifth in his heat in a time of 4 minutes and 53.12 seconds which was ultimately not fast enough to qualify for the final.
