= Malta at the 2016 European Athletics Championships =

- WA code: MLT
- National federation: MAAA
- Website: athleticsmalta.com

in Amsterdam
- Competitors: 2 (1 man and 1 woman) in 2 events
- Medals: Gold 0 Silver 0 Bronze 0 Total 0

European Athletics Championships appearances
- 1958; 1962; 1966; 1969; 1971–1978; 1982; 1986; 1990; 1994; 1998; 2002; 2006; 2010; 2012; 2014; 2016; 2018; 2022; 2024

Malta competed at the 2016 European Athletics Championships in Amsterdam, Netherlands, between 6 and 10 July 2016.

== Results ==
Men

Track & road events

Athlete	Event	Heat		Semifinal		Final	
Athlete	Event	Result	Rank	Result	Rank	Result	Rank
Kevin Moore	100 m	DQ		did not advance			

Women

Track & road events

Athlete	Event	Heat		Semifinal		Final	
Athlete	Event	Result	Rank	Result	Rank	Result	Rank
Charlotte Wingfield	100 m	11.90	22	did not advance			
Charlotte Wingfield	200 m	24.46	26	did not advance			
