= Malta at the 1984 Summer Olympics =

- IOC code: MLT
- NOC: Malta Olympic Committee
- Website: www.nocmalta.org

in Los Angeles
- Competitors: 7
- Flag bearer: Peter Bonello
- Medals: Gold 0 Silver 0 Bronze 0 Total 0

Summer Olympics appearances (overview)
- 1928; 1932; 1936; 1948; 1952–1956; 1960; 1964; 1968; 1972; 1976; 1980; 1984; 1988; 1992; 1996; 2000; 2004; 2008; 2012; 2016; 2020; 2024

Malta was represented at the 1984 Summer Olympics in Los Angeles, California, United States by the Malta Olympic Committee.

In total, seven athletes including five men and two women represented Malta in five different sports including archery, athletics, sailing, shooting and wrestling.

== Background ==
The Malta Olympic Committee was founded in 1928 and Malta made their Olympic debut at the 1928 Summer Olympics in Amsterdam, Netherlands. They participated sporadically over the next 56 years. The 1984 Summer Olympics in Los Angeles, California, United States marked their second consecutive appearance – the country's joint-longest streak of consecutive Olympic appearances – and their eighth appearance overall at the Olympics. Prior to 1984, Malta had not won an Olympic medal.

== Competitors ==
In total, seven athletes represented Malta at the 1984 Summer Olympics in Los Angeles, California, United States across five different sports.

Sport	Men	Women	Total
Archery	0	1	1
Athletics	0	1	1
Sailing	1	0	1
Shooting	2	0	2
Wrestling	2	—	2
Total	5	2	7

== Archery ==
In total, one Maltese athlete participated in the archery events – Joanna Agius in the women's individual.

== Athletics ==
In total, one Maltese athlete participated in the athletics events – Jennifer Pace in the women's javelin throw.

== Sailing ==
In total, one Maltese athlete participated in the sailing events – Peter Bonello in the windglider.

== Shooting ==
In total, two Maltese athletes participated in the shooting events – Michael Gauci and Frans Chetcuti in the trap.

== Wrestling ==
In total, two Maltese athletes participated in the wrestling events – Jesmond Giordemaina in the freestyle –52 kg category and Alexander Zammit in the freestyle –68 kg category.
