= Nestor Jacono =

Maltese sprinter

Personal information
- Nationality: Maltese
- Born: Nestor Jacono; 15 February 1925
- Died: 4 May 2014 (aged 89)

Sport
- Sport: Sprinting
- Event: 100 metres

Nestor Jacono (15 February 1925 – 4 May 2014) was a Maltese sprinter. While Jacono was in college for his studies, he practiced sprinting and would be unbeaten in the collegiate and national level. He won multiple national championships. After his studies, he was ranked first in the nation for his event.

He set a national record and was eventually selected by the Malta Amateur Athletic Association to compete at the 1948 Summer Olympics. There, he competed in the heats of the men's 100 metres sprint and placed last in his heat, not advancing further. Upon returning to Malta, he won more national championships titles.

After his retirement he started a sports club for school children and was a member of multiple sports organizations within the nation such as the Maltese Olympic Committee. Later on in 2005. he was included in the Hall of Fame of the Maltese Olympic Committee. Before his death, he was the oldest living Olympian from Malta.

== Biography ==
Nestor Jacono was born on 15 February 1925. He studied at St Edward's College during the mid-1930s and competed in sprinting. There, he was unbeaten in the 100 yards at the collegiate level and the national level, winning multiple national championships. After his studies, he continued the sport and was eventually ranked first within the nation for his the event.

At the time, Jacono set a national record but World War II paused sporting activities, though he continued training for the sport. He was eventually selected by the Malta Amateur Athletic Association to be the sole representative for Malta at the 1948 Summer Olympics in London, Great Britain. There, he competed in the heats of the men's 100 metres sprint on 30 July against four other athletes. He placed last with a time of 11.54 seconds and did not advance to the quarterfinals of the event.

After the Summer Games, he returned to Malta and continued to win multiple national titles in the 100 yards. He then retired and set up a sports club named the Pegasus Club for training and encouraging school children to practice sport. Later on, he became a member of multiple sports organizations within the nation, such as becoming a member of the Maltese Olympic Committee.

In 2005, he was inducted to the Hall of Fame of the Maltese Olympic Committee due to his services in sport. Jacono later died on 4 May 2014, where he was recognized as the then-oldest Maltese Olympian. His funeral was held in Sliema.
