= Malta at the 1996 Summer Olympics =

- IOC code: MLT
- NOC: Malta Olympic Committee
- Website: www.nocmalta.org

in Atlanta
- Competitors: 7 in 5 sports
- Flag bearer: Angela Galea (opening)
- Officials: 7
- Medals: Gold 0 Silver 0 Bronze 0 Total 0

Summer Olympics appearances (overview)
- 1928; 1932; 1936; 1948; 1952–1956; 1960; 1964; 1968; 1972; 1976; 1980; 1984; 1988; 1992; 1996; 2000; 2004; 2008; 2012; 2016; 2020; 2024

Malta competed at the 1996 Summer Olympics in Atlanta, United States. Malta took part in athletics, judo, sailing, shooting and swimming.

== Results by event ==
=== Athletics ===
Men's 100 metres

- Mario Bonello — 88th place

Women's Marathon

- Carol Galea — did not finish (→ no ranking)

=== Judo ===
Women's Competition

- Laurie Pace — lost her two fights

=== Sailing ===
Men's Board Sailing

- Andrew Wilson — best placing was 27th and finished 38th out of 46

Men's Laser

- John Tabone — at one time 24th place, but finished 41st out of 56 competitors

=== Shooting ===
Men's Competition

- Frans Pace — 20th out of 52

=== Swimming ===
Women's 50m Freestyle

- Gail Rizzo — 4th in heat, 50th out of 55

Women's 100m Freestyle

- Gail Rizzo — last place

Women's 100m Backstroke

- Gail Rizzo — 2nd in her heat and 33rd out of 36
