= Malta at the 1992 Summer Olympics =

- IOC code: MLT
- NOC: Malta Olympic Committee
- Website: www.nocmalta.org

in Barcelona
- Competitors: 6 in 4 sports
- Flag bearer: Laurie Pace
- Medals: Gold 0 Silver 0 Bronze 0 Total 0

Summer Olympics appearances (overview)
- 1928; 1932; 1936; 1948; 1952–1956; 1960; 1964; 1968; 1972; 1976; 1980; 1984; 1988; 1992; 1996; 2000; 2004; 2008; 2012; 2016; 2020; 2024

Malta competed at the 1992 Summer Olympics in Barcelona, Spain. Malta took part in athletics, shooting, judo and sailing.

== Competitors ==
The following is the list of number of competitors in the Games.

Sport	Men	Women	Total
Athletics	0	2	2
Judo	1	1	2
Sailing	1	0	1
Shooting	1	0	1
Total	3	3	6

== Results by event ==
=== Athletics ===
Women's 100 metres

- Deirdre Caruana

- Heat — 12.59 (→ did not advance, 82nd place)

Women's 200 metres

- Deirdre Caruana

- Heat — 25.28 (→ did not advance, 79th place)

Women's 800 metres

- Carol Galea

- Heat — DSQ (→ did not advance, 36th place)

Women's 1.500 metres

- Carol Galea

- Heat — 4:33.41 (→ did not advance, 34th place)

=== Shooting ===
- Horace Micallef → 30th place

=== Judo ===
Men's Competition

- Jason Trevisan → eliminated in first round

Women's Competition

- Laurie Pace → eliminated in first round

=== Sailing ===
Men's Sailboard (Lechner A-390)

- Jean-Paul Soler

- Final Ranking — 331.0 points (→ 33rd place)
