= Malta at the Olympics =

- IOC code: MLT
- NOC: Malta Olympic Committee
- Website: www.nocmalta.org
- Medals: Gold 0 Silver 0 Bronze 0 Total 0

Summer appearances
- 1928; 1932; 1936; 1948; 1952–1956; 1960; 1964; 1968; 1972; 1976; 1980; 1984; 1988; 1992; 1996; 2000; 2004; 2008; 2012; 2016; 2020; 2024

Winter appearances
- 2014; 2018; 2022; 2026

Malta has competed in 18 Summer Olympic Games and 4 Winter Olympic Games, but hasn’t won a medal yet.

As of the Paris 2024 Olympic Games no Maltese competitor has won an Olympic medal, but shooter William Chetcuti (who has won World Championship events) missed the Double Trap Shooting final in 2004, 2008 and 2012 by a relatively slim margin. In 2004 and 2008 Chetcuti was tied for 6th (the required placing to enter the final), but lost at a tie breaker. Elise Pellegrin is the first Winter Olympian to represent the country, in 2014 Winter Olympics in Sochi. Prior to that, Malta was the only member of the European Olympic Committees that hadn't participated at the Winter Olympics.

The Maltese Olympic Committee was formed in 1928 and recognized by the IOC in 1936.

== Medal tables ==
=== Medals by Summer Games ===
Games	Athletes	Gold	Silver	Bronze	Total	Rank
1928 Amsterdam	9	0	0	0	0	–
1932 Los Angeles	did not participate					
1936 Berlin	11	0	0	0	0	–
1948 London	1	0	0	0	0	–
1952 Helsinki	did not participate					
1956 Melbourne	did not participate					
1960 Rome	10	0	0	0	0	–
1964 Tokyo	did not participate					
1968 Mexico City	1	0	0	0	0	–
1972 Munich	5	0	0	0	0	–
1976 Montreal	did not participate					
1980 Moscow	8	0	0	0	0	–
1984 Los Angeles	7	0	0	0	0	–
1988 Seoul	6	0	0	0	0	–
1992 Barcelona	6	0	0	0	0	–
1996 Atlanta	7	0	0	0	0	–
2000 Sydney	7	0	0	0	0	–
2004 Athens	7	0	0	0	0	–
2008 Beijing	6	0	0	0	0	–
2012 London	5	0	0	0	0	–
2016 Rio de Janeiro	7	0	0	0	0	–
2020 Tokyo	6	0	0	0	0	–
2024 Paris	5	0	0	0	0	–
2028 Los Angeles	future event					
2032 Brisbane	future event					
Total		0	0	0	0	–

=== Medals by Winter Games ===
Games	Athletes	Gold	Silver	Bronze	Total	Rank
2014 Sochi	1	0	0	0	0	–
2018 Pyeongchang	1	0	0	0	0	–
2022 Beijing	1	0	0	0	0	–
2026 Milano Cortina	1	0	0	0	0	–
2030 French Alps	future event					
2034 Utah	future event					
Total		0	0	0	0	–

== See also ==
- List of flag bearers for Malta at the Olympics
- Category:Olympic competitors for Malta
- Malta at the Paralympics
