= Malta at the 2016 Summer Olympics =

- IOC code: MLT
- NOC: Malta Olympic Committee
- Website: www.nocmalta.org

in Rio de Janeiro
- Competitors: 7 in 4 sports
- Flag bearer: Andrew Chetcuti
- Medals: Gold 0 Silver 0 Bronze 0 Total 0

Summer Olympics appearances (overview)
- 1928; 1932; 1936; 1948; 1952–1956; 1960; 1964; 1968; 1972; 1976; 1980; 1984; 1988; 1992; 1996; 2000; 2004; 2008; 2012; 2016; 2020; 2024

Malta competed at the 2016 Summer Olympics in Rio de Janeiro, Brazil, from 5 to 21 August 2016. This was the nation's sixteenth appearance at the Summer Olympics, since its debut in 1928, although it failed to register any athletes in five other editions (1932, 1952, 1956, 1964, and 1976).

Malta Olympic Committee selected a team of seven athletes, four men and three women, to compete in four different sports at the Games; all of them granted wild card entries without having qualified. The nation's roster in Rio de Janeiro was also a replication to those sent to Barcelona (1992), Atlanta (1996), and Sydney (2000), with an equal share of men and women. Among the sports represented by the athletes, Malta marked its Olympic debut in weightlifting.

The Maltese delegation featured three returning Olympians, including double trap shooter and medal prospect William Chetcuti, who set a record as the first Maltese to participate in four straight Games. Joining him were freestyle swimming sprinters Nicola Muscat and Andrew Chetcuti, who became the nation's flag bearer in the opening ceremony. Malta, however, has yet to win its first ever Olympic medal.

== Athletics ==
Malta has received universality slots from IAAF to send two athletes (one male and one female) to the Olympics.

Key

- Note–Ranks given for track events are within the athlete's heat only
- Q = Qualified for the next round
- q = Qualified for the next round as a fastest loser or, in field events, by position without achieving the qualifying target
- NR = National record
- N/A = Round not applicable for the event
- Bye = Athlete not required to compete in round

Track & road events

Athlete	Event	Heat		Quarterfinal		Semifinal		Final	
Athlete	Event	Time	Rank	Time	Rank	Time	Rank	Time	Rank
Luke Bezzina	Men's 100 m	11.04	3	Did not advance					
Charlotte Wingfield	Women's 100 m	11.86	1 Q	11.90	8	Did not advance			

== Shooting ==
Malta has received two invitations from the Tripartite Commission to send shooters competing in the men's double trap and women's pistol events, respectively, to the Olympics.

Athlete	Event	Qualification		Semifinal		Final	
Athlete	Event	Points	Rank	Points	Rank	Points	Rank
William Chetcuti	Men's double trap	125	17	Did not advance			
Eleanor Bezzina	Women's 10 m air pistol	379	22	—		Did not advance	
Eleanor Bezzina	Women's 25 m pistol	562	36	Did not advance			

== Swimming ==
Malta has received a Universality invitation from FINA to send two swimmers (one male and one female) to the Olympics.

Athlete	Event	Heat		Semifinal		Final	
Athlete	Event	Time	Rank	Time	Rank	Time	Rank
Andrew Chetcuti	Men's 100 m freestyle	51.37	51	Did not advance			
Nicola Muscat	Women's 50 m freestyle	26.60	53	Did not advance			

== Weightlifting ==
Malta has received an invitation from the Tripartite Commission to send Kyle Micallef in the men's light heavyweight category (85 kg) to the Olympics, signifying the nation's Olympic debut in the sport.

Athlete	Event	Snatch		Clean & Jerk		Total	Rank
Athlete	Event	Result	Rank	Result	Rank	Total	Rank
Kyle Micallef	Men's −85 kg	~~118~~	DNF	—	—	—	DNF
