= Dohou =

Dohou is a name. Notable people with the name include:

- Frédéric Dohou (born 1961), Beninese politician
- Daniel Dohou Dossou (born 1959), Beninese judoka
