= Steffen Stranz =

German judoka (born 1960)

Personal information
- Born: 16 May 1960 (age 66)
- Occupation: Judoka

Sport
- Country: West Germany
- Sport: Judo
- Weight class: ‍–‍71 kg
- Rank: 6th dan black belt

Achievements and titles
- Olympic Games: 5th (1988)
- World Champ.: (bronze) (1983, 1985)
- European Champ.: (bronze) (1983, 1987)
Medal record
Men's judo
Representing West Germany
World Championships
Bronze medal – third place	1983 Moscow	‍–‍71 kg
Bronze medal – third place	1985 Seoul	‍–‍71 kg
European Championships
Bronze medal – third place	1983 Paris	‍–‍71 kg
Bronze medal – third place	1987 Paris	‍–‍71 kg

Profile at external databases
- IJF: 53693
- JudoInside.com: 4874
- Updated on 9 July 2024

Steffen Stranz (born 16 May 1960 in Kassel, Hessen) is a retired male judoka from Germany, who twice competed for West Germany at the Summer Olympics: 1984 and 1988.

At the 1988 Olympic Games, Stranz was eliminated in the quarterfinals of the Men's Lightweight (–71 kg) division by East Germany's eventual silver medalist Sven Loll. Stranz twice won a bronze medal at the World Championships during his career.
