= Malta at the 1968 Summer Olympics =

- IOC code: MLT
- NOC: Malta Olympic Committee
- Website: www.nocmalta.org

in Mexico City
- Competitors: 1 in 1 sport
- Flag bearer: Louis Grasso
- Medals: Gold 0 Silver 0 Bronze 0 Total 0

Summer Olympics appearances (overview)
- 1928; 1932; 1936; 1948; 1952–1956; 1960; 1964; 1968; 1972; 1976; 1980; 1984; 1988; 1992; 1996; 2000; 2004; 2008; 2012; 2016; 2020; 2024

Malta sent a delegation to compete at the 1968 Summer Olympics in Mexico City, Mexico from 12 to 27 October 1968. It was the country's fifth Olympic appearance, but the first time as an independent country, after gaining independence from Great Britain in 1964. The nation returned to the Olympic Games after missing the 1964 Summer Olympics. The delegation consisted of one male shooter, Joseph Grech, who participated the mixed skeet and ranked 46. An official, Louis Grasso, carried the flag in the opening ceremony.

== Background ==
Malta achieved independence from Great Britain on 21 September 1964. The Malta Olympic Committee, established in 1928 and recognized by the International Olympic Committee (IOC) in 1936. Before the 1968 Mexico City Olympics, Malta had participated in the Olympics four times, when Malta was still a British Crown colony. These were in 1928, 1936, 1948 and 1960.

In this 1968 Olympics, skeet shooter Joseph Grech was the only athlete sent to the Mexico City. The chefs-de-mission Louis Grasso was chosen as the flagbearer during the opening ceremony on 12 October 1968.

== Competitors ==
The following is the list of number of competitors participating at the Games per sport/discipline.

| Sport | Men | Women | Total |
|---|---|---|---|
| Shooting | 1 | 0 | 1 |
| Total | 1 | 0 | 1 |

== Shooting ==
Joseph Grech, Malta’s sole representative, competed in the skeet shooting event on 21–22 October 1968 at the Vicente Suárez Shooting Range in Mexico City. Grech had represented Malta in the 1960 Rome Olympics, taking part in men's trap, and would represent Malta again in the 1972 Munich Olympics, taking part in mixed skeet. Scoring 173 points, Grech finished 46th out of 52 competitors. In the event, the gold medal was won by Yevgeny Petrov from Soviet Union, silver by Romano Garagnani from Italy and bronze by Konrad Wirnhier from West Germany.

| Athlete | Event | Final | | Ref. |
| Athlete | Event | Score | Rank | Ref. |
|---|---|---|---|---|
| Joseph Grech | Skeet | 173 | 46 | |

== See also ==
- Malta at the 1968 Summer Paralympics
