= Malta at the 2004 Summer Olympics =

- IOC code: MLT
- NOC: Malta Olympic Committee
- Website: www.nocmalta.org

in Athens
- Competitors: 7 in 5 sports
- Flag bearer: William Chetcuti
- Medals: Gold 0 Silver 0 Bronze 0 Total 0

Summer Olympics appearances (overview)
- 1928; 1932; 1936; 1948; 1952–1956; 1960; 1964; 1968; 1972; 1976; 1980; 1984; 1988; 1992; 1996; 2000; 2004; 2008; 2012; 2016; 2020; 2024

Malta competed at the 2004 Summer Olympics in Athens, Greece, from 13 to 29 August 2004. This was the nation's thirteenth appearance at the Olympics since its debut in 1928.

Malta Olympic Committee sent a total of seven athletes, four men and three women, to compete only in athletics, judo, sailing, shooting, and swimming at these Games, matching its delegation count with Atlanta and Sydney. Double trap shooter William Chetcuti became the nation's flag bearer in the opening ceremony. Malta, however, has yet to win its first Olympic medal.

== Athletics ==
Maltese athletes have so far achieved qualifying standards in the following athletics events (up to a maximum of 3 athletes in each event at the 'A' Standard, and 1 at the 'B' Standard).

Men

Athlete	Event	Heat		Quarterfinal		Semifinal		Final	
Athlete	Event	Result	Rank	Result	Rank	Result	Rank	Result	Rank
Darren Gilford	100 m	10.67	5	did not advance					

Women

Athlete	Event	Heat		Semifinal		Final	
Athlete	Event	Result	Rank	Result	Rank	Result	Rank
Tanya Blake	800 m	2:19.34	7	did not advance			

Key

- Note–Ranks given for track events are within the athlete's heat only
- Q = Qualified for the next round
- q = Qualified for the next round as a fastest loser or, in field events, by position without achieving the qualifying target
- NR = National record
- N/A = Round not applicable for the event
- Bye = Athlete not required to compete in round

== Judo ==
One Maltese judoka qualified for the 2004 Summer Olympics.

Athlete	Event	Round of 32	Round of 16	Quarterfinals	Semifinals	Repechage 1	Repechage 2	Repechage 3	Final / BM	
Athlete	Event	Opposition Result	Opposition Result	Opposition Result	Opposition Result	Opposition Result	Opposition Result	Opposition Result	Opposition Result	Rank
Marcon Bezzina	Women's −57 kg	Kye S-H (PRK); L 0000–1010	did not advance			Yukhareva (RUS); L 0000–1100	did not advance			

== Sailing ==
Maltese sailors have qualified one boat for each of the following events.

Open

Athlete	Event	Race											Net points	Final rank
Athlete	Event	1	2	3	4	5	6	7	8	9	10	M*	Net points	Final rank
Mario Aquilina	Laser	27	37	40	26	~~OCS~~	37	21	40	38	39	34	339	39

M = Medal race; OCS = On course side of the starting line; DSQ = Disqualified; DNF = Did not finish; DNS= Did not start; RDG = Redress given

== Shooting ==
One Maltese shooter qualified to compete in the following events:

Men

Athlete	Event	Qualification		Final	
Athlete	Event	Points	Rank	Points	Rank
William Chetcuti	Double trap	134 (1)	=9	did not advance	

== Swimming ==
Men

Athlete	Event	Heat		Final	
Athlete	Event	Time	Rank	Time	Rank
Neil Agius	400 m freestyle	4:22.14	46	did not advance	

Women

Athlete	Event	Heat		Semifinal		Final	
Athlete	Event	Time	Rank	Time	Rank	Time	Rank
Angela Galea	100 m butterfly	1:05.47	36	did not advance			

== See also ==
- Malta at the 2005 Mediterranean Games
