= Malta at the 2020 Summer Olympics =

- IOC code: MLT
- NOC: Malta Olympic Committee
- Website: www.nocmalta.org

in Tokyo, Japan 23 July 2021 – 8 August 2021
- Competitors: 6 in 5 sports
- Flag bearers (opening): Eleanor Bezzina; Andrew Chetcuti
- Flag bearer (closing): N/A
- Medals: Gold 0 Silver 0 Bronze 0 Total 0

Summer Olympics appearances (overview)
- 1928; 1932; 1936; 1948; 1952–1956; 1960; 1964; 1968; 1972; 1976; 1980; 1984; 1988; 1992; 1996; 2000; 2004; 2008; 2012; 2016; 2020; 2024

Malta competed at the 2020 Summer Olympics in Tokyo. Originally scheduled to take place from 24 July to 9 August 2020, the Games were postponed to 23 July to 8 August 2021, because of the COVID-19 pandemic.

== Competitors ==
The following is the list of number of competitors in the Games.

Sport	Men	Women	Total
Athletics	0	1	1
Badminton	1	0	1
Shooting	0	1	1
Swimming	1	1	2
Weightlifting	0	1	1
Total	2	4	6

== Athletics ==
Malta received a universality slot from the World Athletics to send a female track and field athlete to the Olympics.

Key

- Note–Ranks given for track events are within the athlete's heat only
- Q = Qualified for the next round
- q = Qualified for the next round as a fastest loser or, in field events, by position without achieving the qualifying target
- NR = National record
- N/A = Round not applicable for the event
- Bye = Athlete not required to compete in round

Track & road events

Athlete	Event	Heat		Quarterfinal		Semifinal		Final	
Athlete	Event	Result	Rank	Result	Rank	Result	Rank	Result	Rank
Carla Scicluna	Women's 100 m	12.11	4 q	12.16	8	Did not advance			

== Badminton ==
For the first time in history, Malta entered one badminton player into the Olympic tournament. Matthew Abela accepted the invitation from the Tripartite Commission and the Badminton World Federation to compete in the men's singles.

Athlete	Event	Group stage			Elimination	Quarterfinal	Semifinal	Final / BM	
Athlete	Event	Opposition Score	Opposition Score	Rank	Opposition Score	Opposition Score	Opposition Score	Opposition Score	Rank
Matthew Abela	Men's singles	Shi Yq (CHN); L (9–21, 8–21)	Opti (SUR); W (WO)	2	Did not advance				

== Shooting ==
Malta received an invitation from the Tripartite Commission to send a women's pistol shooter to the Olympics, based on her minimum qualifying score (MQS) attained on or before June 6, 2021.

Athlete	Event	Qualification		Final	
Athlete	Event	Points	Rank	Points	Rank
Eleanor Bezzina	Women's 10 m air pistol	570	26	Did not advance	
Eleanor Bezzina	Women's 25 m pistol	565	41	Did not advance	

== Swimming ==
Malta received a universality invitation from FINA to send two top-ranked swimmers (one per gender) in their respective individual events to the Olympics, based on the FINA Points System of June 28, 2021.

Athlete	Event	Heat		Semifinal		Final	
Athlete	Event	Time	Rank	Time	Rank	Time	Rank
Andrew Chetcuti	Men's 100 m freestyle	51.47	49	Did not advance			
Sasha Gatt	Women's 400 m freestyle	4:19.75	22	—		Did not advance	
Sasha Gatt	Women's 1500 m freestyle	16:57.47	33	—		Did not advance	

== Weightlifting ==
Malta receiving one tripartite invitation quotas from International Weightlifting Federation.

Athlete	Event	Snatch		Clean & Jerk		Total	Rank
Athlete	Event	Result	Rank	Result	Rank	Total	Rank
Yasmin Zammit Stevens	Women's –64 kg	84	14	105	13	189	13
