= Malta at the 1988 Summer Olympics =

- IOC code: MLT
- NOC: Malta Olympic Committee
- Website: www.nocmalta.org

in Seoul
- Competitors: 6 in 4 sports
- Flag bearer: Joanna Agius
- Medals: Gold 0 Silver 0 Bronze 0 Total 0

Summer Olympics appearances (overview)
- 1928; 1932; 1936; 1948; 1952–1956; 1960; 1964; 1968; 1972; 1976; 1980; 1984; 1988; 1992; 1996; 2000; 2004; 2008; 2012; 2016; 2020; 2024

Malta competed at the 1988 Summer Olympics in Seoul, South Korea.

== Competitors ==
The following is the list of number of competitors in the Games.

Sport	Men	Women	Total
Archery	0	1	1
Judo	2	–	2
Sailing	1	0	1
Wrestling	2	–	2
Total	5	1	6

== Results by event ==
=== Archery ===
Women's Individual Competition

- Joanna Agius

- Preliminary Round — did not advance (→ 58th place)

=== Judo ===
Men's Competition

- Jason Trevisan

=== Sailing ===
Men's Board Sailing

- Jean Paul Fleri Soler

=== Wrestling ===
Men's Competition

- Paul Farrugia
- Jesmond Giordemaina
