= Malta at the 2024 Summer Olympics =

- IOC code: MLT
- NOC: Malta Olympic Committee
- Website: www.nocmalta.org

in Paris, France 26 July 2024 – 11 August 2024
- Competitors: 5 (3 men and 2 women) in 4 sports
- Flag bearer: Gianluca Chetcuti & Sasha Gatt
- Medals: Gold 0 Silver 0 Bronze 0 Total 0

Summer Olympics appearances (overview)
- 1928; 1932; 1936; 1948; 1952–1956; 1960; 1964; 1968; 1972; 1976; 1980; 1984; 1988; 1992; 1996; 2000; 2004; 2008; 2012; 2016; 2020; 2024

Malta competed at the 2024 Summer Olympics in Paris, France, from 26 July to 11 August 2024.

== Competitors ==
The following is the list of number of competitors in the Games.

| Sport | Men | Women | Total |
|---|---|---|---|
| Athletics | 1 | 0 | 1 |
| Judo | 0 | 1 | 1 |
| Shooting | 1 | 0 | 1 |
| Swimming | 1 | 1 | 2 |
| Total | 3 | 2 | 5 |

== Athletics ==
Malta sent one sprinter to compete at the 2024 Summer Olympics.

Key

- Note–Ranks given for track events are within the athlete's heat only
- Q = Qualified for the next round
- q = Qualified for the next round as a fastest loser or, in field events, by position without achieving the qualifying target
- NR = National record
- N/A = Round not applicable for the event
- Bye = Athlete not required to compete in round

Track events

| Athlete | Event | Preliminaries | | Heat | | Repechage | | Semifinal | | Final | |
| Athlete | Event | Result | Rank | Result | Rank | Result | Rank | Result | Rank | Result | Rank |
|---|---|---|---|---|---|---|---|---|---|---|---|
| Beppe Grillo | Men's 100 m | 10.69 | 5 | Did not advance | | — | | Did not advance | | | |

== Judo ==
For the first time since 2008, Malta qualified one judoka for the following weight class at the Games. Katryna Esposito qualified for the games through the allocations of universality places.

| Athlete | Event | Round of 32 | Round of 16 | Quarterfinals | Semifinals | Repechage | Final / BM | |
| Athlete | Event | Opposition Result | Opposition Result | Opposition Result | Opposition Result | Opposition Result | Opposition Result | Rank |
|---|---|---|---|---|---|---|---|---|
| Katryna Esposito | Women's –48 kg | Bavuudorjiin (MGL); L 00–10 | Did not advance | | | | | |

== Shooting ==
Maltese shooters achieved one quota places for Paris 2024 based on the allocations of universality spots.

| Athlete | Event | Qualification | | Final | |
| Athlete | Event | Points | Rank | Points | Rank |
|---|---|---|---|---|---|
| Gianluca Chetcuti | Men's trap | 116 | 29 | Did not advance | |

== Swimming ==
Malta sent two swimmers to compete at the 2024 Paris Olympics.

| Athlete | Event | Heat | | Semifinal | | Final | |
| Athlete | Event | Time | Rank | Time | Rank | Time | Rank |
|---|---|---|---|---|---|---|---|
| Kyle Micallef | Men's 50 m freestyle | 22.89 | 41 | Did not advance | | | |
| Sasha Gatt | Women's 1500 m freestyle | 17:00.54 | 16 | — | | Did not advance | |
