= Malta at the 1972 Summer Olympics =

- IOC code: MLT
- NOC: Malta Olympic Committee
- Website: www.nocmalta.org

in Munich
- Competitors: 5 in 2 sports
- Flag bearer: Peppi Grech
- Medals: Gold 0 Silver 0 Bronze 0 Total 0

Summer Olympics appearances (overview)
- 1928; 1932; 1936; 1948; 1952–1956; 1960; 1964; 1968; 1972; 1976; 1980; 1984; 1988; 1992; 1996; 2000; 2004; 2008; 2012; 2016; 2020; 2024

Malta competed at the 1972 Summer Olympics in Munich, West Germany. Five competitors, all men, took part in two events in two sports.

== Cycling ==
Four cyclists represented Malta in 1972.

Team time trial

- Louis Bezzina, John Magri, Joseph Said, and Alfred Tonna – 2:31:40.1 (31st place)

== Shooting ==
Skeet

- Joseph Grech – 170 pts (55th place)
