= Malta at the 2024 European Athletics Championships =

- Flag of Malta
- WA code: MLT

in Rome, Italy 7 June 2024 – 12 June 2022
- Competitors: 2 (1 man and 1 woman)
- Medals: Gold 0 Silver 0 Bronze 0 Total 0

European Athletics Championships appearances
- 1958; 1962; 1966; 1969; 1971–1978; 1982; 1986; 1990; 1994; 1998; 2002; 2006; 2010; 2012; 2014; 2016; 2018; 2022; 2024

Malta competed at the 2024 European Athletics Championships in Rome, Italy from 7–12 June 2024.

== Results ==
Malta entered the following athletes.

Key

- Q = Qualified for the next round
- q = Qualified for the next round as a fastest loser or, in field events, by position without achieving the qualifying target
- NR = National record
- PB = Personal best
- SB = Season best
- N/A = Round not applicable for the event

=== Men ===
Track and road events

Athlete	Event	Heat		Semifinal		Final	
Athlete	Event	Result	Rank	Result	Rank	Result	Rank
Jared Micallef	800 metres	1:47.91	30	Did not advance			

=== Women ===
Track and road events

Athlete	Event	Heat		Semifinal		Final	
Athlete	Event	Result	Rank	Result	Rank	Result	Rank
Janet Richard	800 metres	2:04.34	27	Did not advance			
