= Park Chung Hee (disambiguation) =

Park Chung Hee (1917–1979) was the 3rd President of South Korea from 1963 to 1979.

Park Chung Hee may also refer to:

- Park Chung-hee (handballer) (born 1975), a South Korean handball player
- Park Jung-hee (sport shooter) (born 1967), a South Korean sport shooter
- Park Jeong-hui (born 1966), a South Korean judoka
