= Eugene McManus =

Irish judoka

Personal information
- Nationality: Irish
- Born: 20 July 1962 (age 62)

Sport
- Sport: Judo

Eugene McManus (born 20 July 1962) is an Irish judoka. He competed in the men's lightweight event at the 1988 Summer Olympics.
