= Grigoriy Matuzkov =

Kazakhstani swimmer

Personal information
- Full name: Grigoriy Matuzkov
- National team: Kazakhstan
- Born: 2 May 1971 (age 55) Pavlodar, Kazakh SSR, Soviet Union
- Height: 1.88 m (6 ft 2 in)
- Weight: 74 kg (163 lb)

Sport
- Sport: Swimming
- Strokes: Individual medley
- Club: Clube de Regatas do Flamengo (BRA)

Grigoriy Matuzkov (Kazakh: Григорий Юрьевич Матузков; born May 2, 1971) is a Kazakh former swimmer, who specialized in individual medley events. At only 29 years of age, Matuzkov represented Kazakhstan in his official debut at the 2000 Summer Olympics, and spent four years in Rio de Janeiro, Brazil (1997–2001) training for the Flamengo Swim Club (Portuguese: Clube de Regatas do Flamengo).

Matuzkov competed in a medley double at the 2000 Summer Olympics in Sydney. He achieved FINA B-standards of 2:07.62 (200 m individual medley) and 4:34.69 (400 m individual medley) from the Kazakhstan Open Championships in Almaty. On the second day of the Games, Matuzkov placed thirty-ninth in the 400 m individual medley. Swimming in heat two, he picked up a sixth seed by 0.16 of a second behind Mexico's Juan Veloz in 4:31.89. Three days later, in the 200 m individual medley, Matuzkov held off a challenge from Bahamas' Jeremy Knowles to lead the second heat in a Kazakh record of 2:05.45. Matuzkov's best time was not enough to put him through to the semifinals, as he placed twenty-ninth overall in the prelims.
