= Cezar Bădiță =

Romanian swimmer

Cezar Bădiţă
Personal information
- Full name: Cezar Alexandru Bădiţă
- Nationality: Romanian
- Born: 12 April 1979 (age 47) București
- Height: 1.93 m (6 ft 4 in)
- Weight: 93 kg (205 lb)

Sport
- Sport: Swimming
- Strokes: Medley
Medal record
European LC Championships
Silver medal – second place	2000 Helsinki	400 m individual medley

Cezar Bădiţă (born 12 April 1979 in Bucharest) is an international medley swimmer from Romania, who represented his native country at the 2000 Summer Olympics in Sydney, Australia. Prior to that tournament, at the 2000 European Aquatics Championships in Helsinki, Finland, he won the silver medal at the 400 m individual medley.

At the 2003 World Championships, he swam to Romanian Records in the 200 and 400 IMs (2:01.58 and 4:19.72).

== See also ==
- List of doping cases in sport
