= Malta at the 2011 World Championships in Athletics =

- WA code: MLT
- National federation: Malta Amateur Athletic Association
- Website: www.athleticsmalta.org

in Daegu
- Competitors: 2
- Medals: Gold 0 Silver 0 Bronze 0 Total 0

World Championships in Athletics appearances
- 1983; 1987; 1991; 1993; 1995; 1997; 1999; 2001; 2003; 2005; 2007; 2009; 2011; 2013; 2015; 2017; 2019; 2022; 2023

Malta competed at the 2011 World Championships in Athletics from August 27 to September 4 in Daegu, South Korea. A team of 2 athletes was announced to represent the country in the event.

== Results ==
=== Men ===
| Athlete | Event | Preliminaries | | Heats | | Semifinals | | Final | |
| Athlete | Event | Time Width Height | Rank | Time Width Height | Rank | Time Width Height | Rank | Time Width Height | Rank |
|---|---|---|---|---|---|---|---|---|---|
| Karl Farrugia | 100 metres | 11.21 | 14 | Did not advance | | | | | |

=== Women ===
| Athlete | Event | Preliminaries | | Heats | | Semifinals | | Final | |
| Athlete | Event | Time Width Height | Rank | Time Width Height | Rank | Time Width Height | Rank | Time Width Height | Rank |
|---|---|---|---|---|---|---|---|---|---|
| Diane Borg | 100 metres | 12.29 Q | 9 | 12.21 | 43 | Did not advance | | | |
