= Malta at the 1948 Summer Olympics =

- Flag of Malta
- IOC code: MLT
- NOC: Malta Olympic Committee
- Website: www.nocmalta.org

in London
- Competitors: 1 in 1 sport
- Flag bearer: Francis Zammit Cutajar
- Medals: Gold 0 Silver 0 Bronze 0 Total 0

Summer Olympics appearances (overview)
- 1928; 1932; 1936; 1948; 1952–1956; 1960; 1964; 1968; 1972; 1976; 1980; 1984; 1988; 1992; 1996; 2000; 2004; 2008; 2012; 2016; 2020; 2024

Malta competed at the 1948 Summer Olympics in London, England, from 29 July to 14 August 1948. This marked the country's third appearance at the Summer Olympics, having previously participated in 1928 and 1936 as the Crown Colony of Malta, a British crown colony. Malta sent a single competitor, sprinter Nestor Jacono, to the athletics events. An official, Francis Zammit Cutajar, served as the flagbearer during the opening ceremony at Wembley Stadium.

== Background ==
The Maltese Olympic Committee was established in 1928 and recognized by the International Olympic Committee (IOC) in 1936. In 1948, Malta was still a British Crown colony and this was their third time participating in Olympic Games, since their debut in 1928.

In this 1948 Olympics, sprinter Nestor Jacono was the only athlete sent to London. An official, Francis Zammit Cutajar, was chosen as the flagbearer during the opening ceremony on 29 July.

== Competitors ==
The following is the list of number of competitors participating at the Games per sport/discipline.

| Sport | Men | Women | Total |
|---|---|---|---|
| Athletics | 1 | 0 | 1 |
| Total | 1 | 0 | 1 |

== Athletics ==
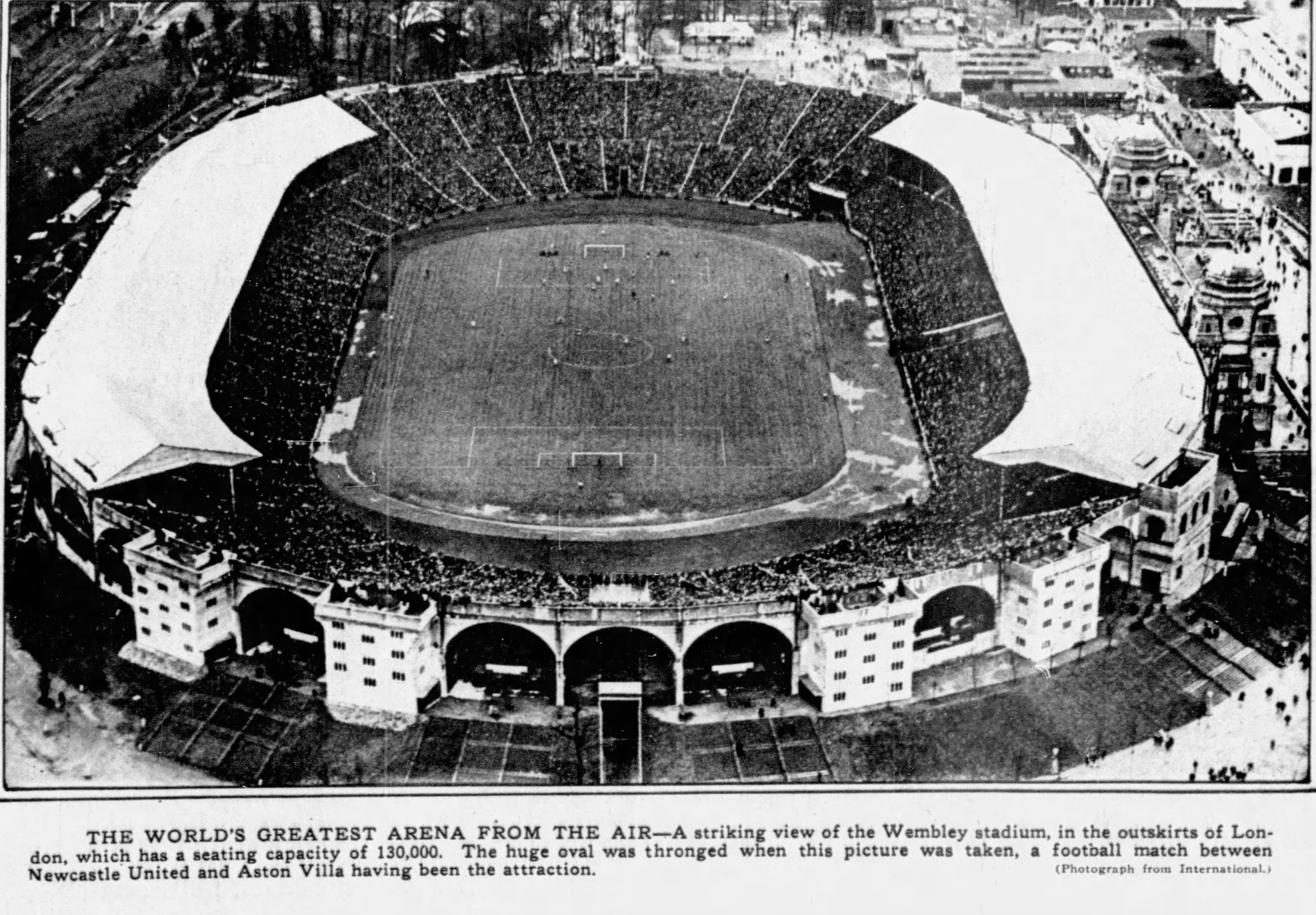
Empire Stadium, where the athletics events were held.

Nestor Jacono competed in the men's 100 metres sprint on 30 July 1948 at Empire Stadium. Jacono was 23 years old at the time of London Games. 63 athletes from 33 countries competed in the event. They were assigned into 12 heat groups. Top two in each heat advanced to the quarter-finals. Jacono was assigned in heat 1, finished fifth out of six in his heat with a time of 11.3 seconds, failing to advance. The gold medal was won by Harrison Dillard from the United States with a time of 10.3 seconds, equaling the Olympic record at the time, silver by Barney Ewell from the United States and bronze by Lloyd LaBeach from Panama.

Key

- Note–Ranks given for track events are within the athlete's heat only

Men
Track & road events

| Athlete | Event | Heat | | Quarterfinal | | Semifinal | | Final | | Ref. |
| Athlete | Event | Result | Rank | Result | Rank | Result | Rank | Result | Rank | Ref. |
|---|---|---|---|---|---|---|---|---|---|---|
| Nestor Jacono | 100 m | 11.3 | 5 | did not advance | | | | | | |
