= Stewart Brain =

Australian judoka

Personal information
- Nationality: Australian
- Born: 4 January 1962 (age 64)
- Height: 170 cm (5 ft 7 in)
- Weight: 71 kg (157 lb)

Sport
- Sport: Judo

Stewart Brain (born 4 January 1962) is an Australian judoka. He competed in the men's lightweight event at the 1988 Summer Olympics. In 1986, he won the bronze medal in the 71 kg weight category at the judo demonstration sport event as part of the 1986 Commonwealth Games.
