= Jenny Axisa Eriksen =

Norwegian-Maltese cross-country skier (born 2005)

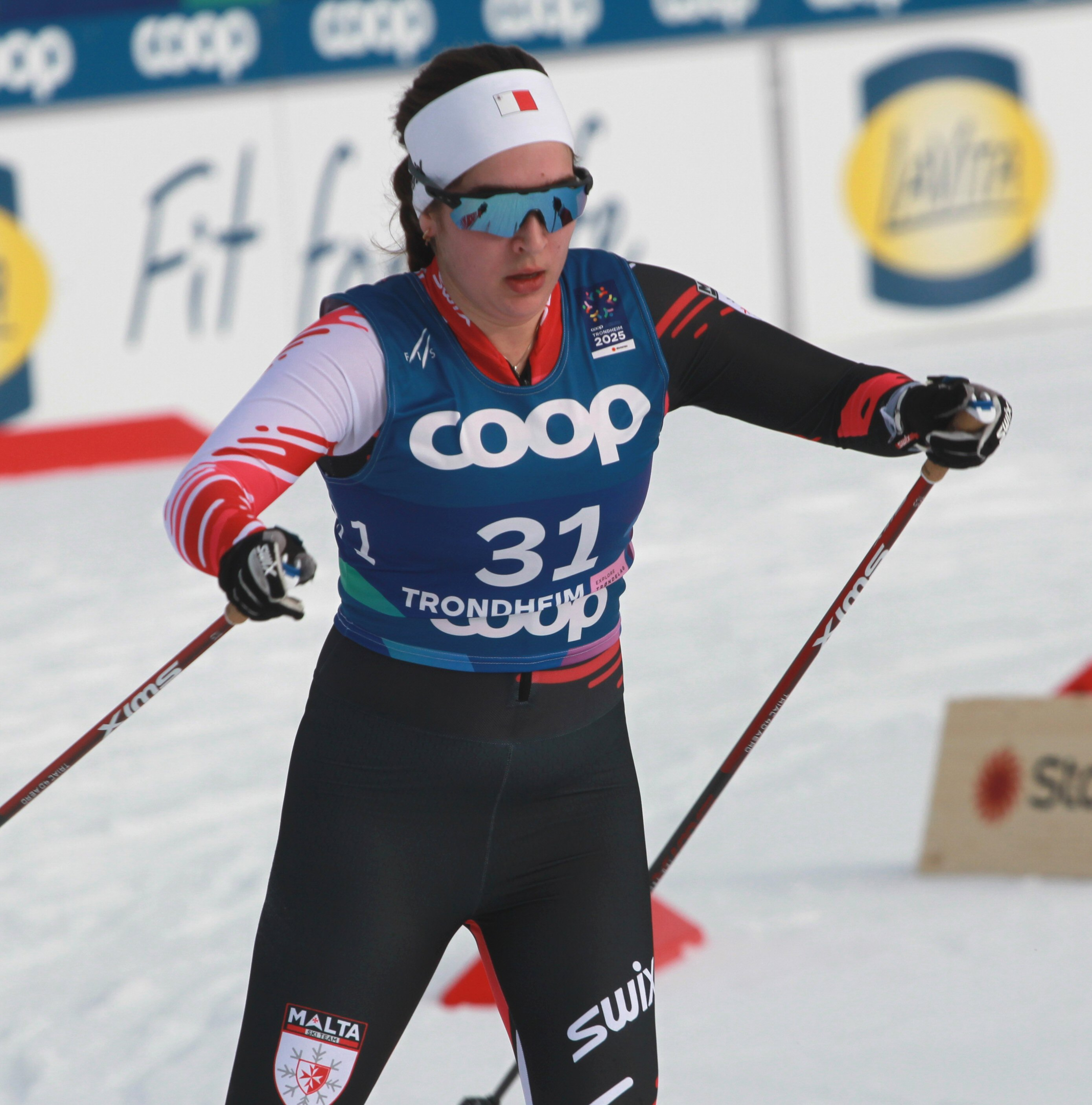

Personal information
- Citizenship: Norway; Malta
- Born: April 4, 2005 (age 21) Sandefjord Municipality, Norway

Sport
- Sport: Cross-country skiing

Jenny Axisa Eriksen is a Norwegian-Maltese cross-country skier. She represented Malta at the 2026 Winter Olympics.

== Biography ==
Born and raised in Norway by a Maltese mother and a Norwegian father, she began skiing at the age of 2.

She qualified to represent Malta in the 10km freestyle cross-country skiing event at the 2026 Winter Olympics, and was the country's flag bearer. This marked the country's debut in the sport at the Winter Olympics.
