= Malta at the 2026 Winter Olympics =

- Flag of Malta
- IOC code: MLT
- NOC: Malta Olympic Committee
- Website: www.nocmalta.org

in Milan and Cortina d'Ampezzo, Italy 6 February 2026 – 22 February 2026
- Competitors: 1 (1 woman) in 1 sport
- Flag bearer (opening): Jenny Axisa Eriksen
- Flag bearer (closing): Volunteer
- Medals: Gold 0 Silver 0 Bronze 0 Total 0

Winter Olympics appearances (overview)
- 2014; 2018; 2022; 2026

Malta competed at the 2026 Winter Olympics in Milan and Cortina d'Ampezzo, Italy, from 6 to 22 February 2026.

As Malta's only athlete, cross-country skier Jenny Axisa Eriksen was the country's flagbearer during the opening ceremony. Meanwhile, a volunteer was the country's flagbearer during the closing ceremony.

== Background ==
Malta first sent a delegation to compete in the Summer Olympics in the 1928 Amsterdam Games. They have competed in most Summer Olympics since, missing the Olympics only in five occasions between 1928 and 2016. These were in 1932, 1952, 1956, 1964, and 1976. In spite of this, they did not send a delegation to the Winter Olympics until the 2014 Winter Olympics in Sochi, Russia. This 2026 Winter Olympics, held from 6 to 22 February, was the country's fourth Winter Olympic appearance, after the 2022 Winter Olympics. Cross-country skier Jenny Axisa Eriksen was the only competitor sent to the Milano Cortina games. She was chosen as the country's flagbearer during the opening ceremony, while a volunteer bore the flag in the closing ceremony.

== Competitors ==
The following is the list of number of competitors participating at the Games per sport/discipline.

Sport	Men	Women	Total
Cross-country skiing	0	1	1
Total	0	1	1

== Cross-country skiing ==
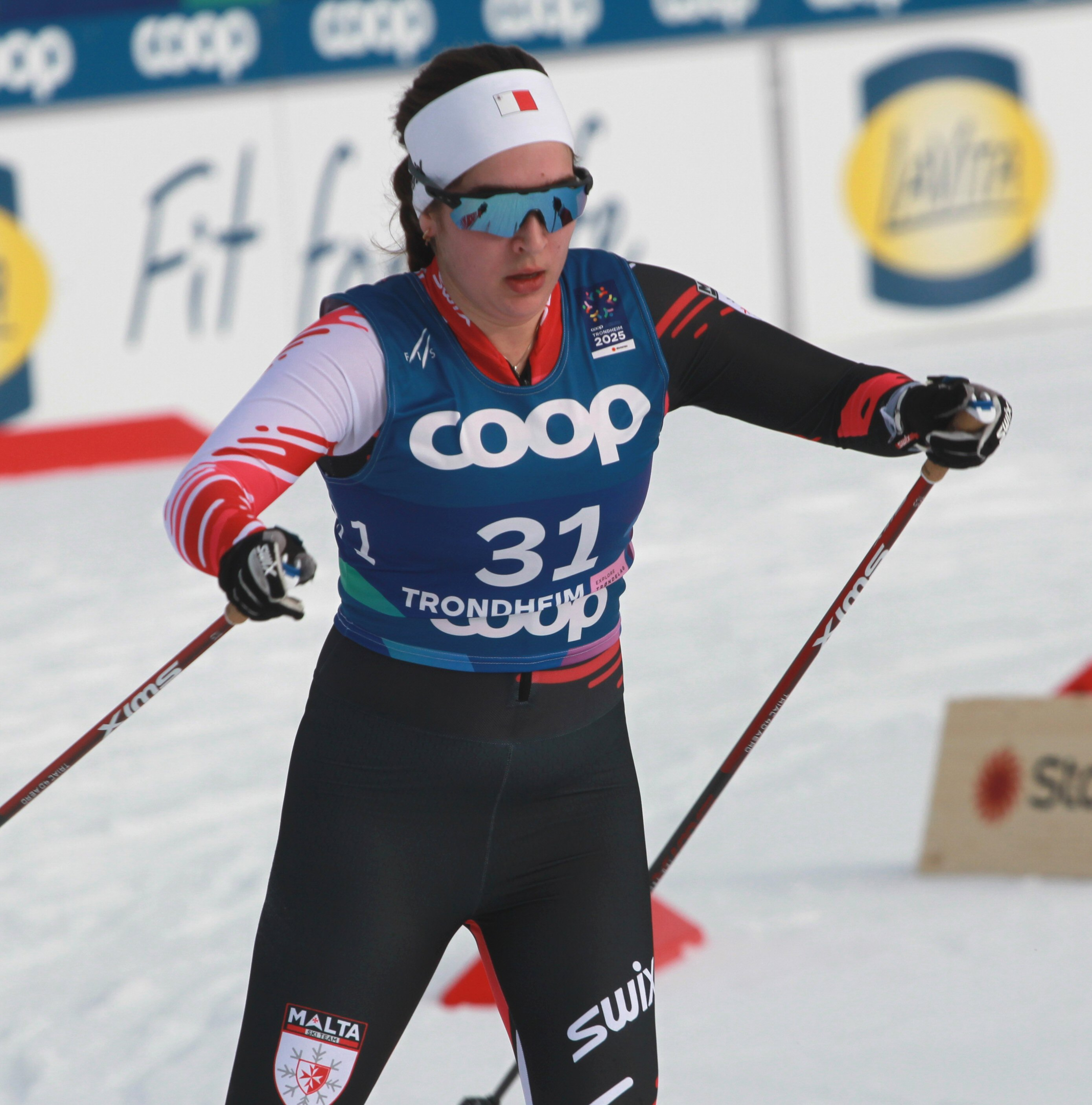
Jenny Axisa Eriksen in 2025

Malta qualified one female cross-country skier through the basic quota. This marked the country's debut in the sport at the Winter Olympics. The country was represented by Jenny Axisa Eriksen, a skier who was born and raised in Norway by her Maltese mother and Norwegian father.

Athlete	Event	Final		
Athlete	Event	Time	Deficit	Rank
Jenny Axisa Eriksen	Women's 10 km freestyle	32:51.4	+10:02.2	107
