= Xiong Fengshan =

Chinese judoka

Personal information
- Full name: 熊 鳳山, Pinyin: Xióng Fèng-shān
- Nationality: Chinese
- Born: 15 October 1963 (age 61); Beijing, China

Sport
- Sport: Judo

Xiong Fengshan (born 15 October 1963) is a Chinese judoka. He competed in the men's lightweight event at the 1988 Summer Olympics.
