= Keisung High School =

High school in Daegu, South Korea

Keisung Academy

Location
- Jung-gu, Daegu; South Korea
- Coordinates: 35.8711°N 128.5287°E

Information
- Type: Independent school, boarding
- Motto: Initium Sapientiae Timor Domini 여호와를 경외하는 것이 지식의 근본이니라
- Religious affiliation: Presbyterian
- Established: 1906
- Principal: Yoo Cheol-hwan
- Faculty: 88
- Enrollment: 917 (2015)
- Website: http://www.keisung.hs.kr

Keisung Academy (계성고등학교) is a co-educational independent day and boarding school for grades 10–12, located in Daegu, South Korea.

== History ==
=== Origins ===
Keisung Academy was established in 1906 by missionary James E. Adams.

== Campus facilities ==
=== Academic facilities ===
- Henderson Hall was built in 1931 and is the symbol of Keisung Academy.
- Adams Hall was used to print the Declaration of Independence of Korea in 1919 for the 3.1 movement in Daegu. The first western-style building in Young-Nam region(Gyeong-Sang State).
- Mcpherson Hall was built as a Science building. but now it is being used as the Church of Keisung Academy
- Adams Memorial Hall
- Art building
- Dong-san Hall
- Shin Dong-san Hall

=== Athletic facilities ===
- Shetuck Hall
- 2 fields
- 5 basketball courts
- 1 tennis court
- 1 fitness center

== Relationship with Sinmyeong High School and Keimyung University ==
The name of Keimyung University is combination of 'Kei' of Keisung and 'myung' of Sinmyung.

== Extra-curricular activities ==
There are 21 clubs.

== Alumni ==
- Park Mok-wol (graduated 1935), poet
- Park Jeong-hui, judo practitioner
