= Malta at the 2018 Winter Olympics =

- Flag of Malta
- IOC code: MLT
- NOC: Malta Olympic Committee
- Website: www.nocmalta.org

in Pyeongchang, South Korea 9–25 February 2018
- Competitors: 1 (1 woman) in 1 sport
- Flag bearer: Élise Pellegrin
- Medals: Gold 0 Silver 0 Bronze 0 Total 0

Winter Olympics appearances (overview)
- 2014; 2018; 2022; 2026

Malta sent a delegation to compete at the 2018 Winter Olympics in Pyeongchang, South Korea, from 9 to 25 February 2018, with one competitor, alpine skier Élise Pellegrin. It was the country's second Winter Olympic appearance, after the 2014 Winter Olympics. Pellegrin was designated as the flag bearer for both the parade of nations during the opening ceremony, and the closing ceremony. She was disqualified from the giant slalom, and finished 50th in the slalom.

== Background ==
Malta first sent a delegation to compete in the Summer Olympics in the 1928 Amsterdam Games. They have competed in most Summer Olympics since, missing the Olympics only in five occasions between 1928 and 2016. These were in 1932, 1952, 1956, 1964, and 1976. In spite of this, they did not send a delegation to the Winter Olympics until the 2014 Winter Olympics in Sochi, Russia. Élise Pellegrin was the only competitor sent to the Sochi games, and she was also the only competitor in the designation sent to Pyeongchang in 2018. Pellegrin went to Pyeongchang with her coach Marvin Hocquax. The Chef de Mission of the delegation was Lucienne Attard. As the only athlete, Pellegrin was chosen as the flag bearer for both the parade of nations during the opening ceremony, and the closing ceremony.

== Alpine skiing ==
Malta qualified one female athlete, Élise Pellegrin, she was 26 years old at the time of the Pyeongchang Games. In the giant slalom held on 15 February 2018, Pellegrin was disqualified for going outside her lane during the first run. The next day the slalom was much better for her, recording a time of one minute and five seconds in the first run, which was good for 56th place. That afternoon, she improved her time to 58.90 seconds, good enough for 50th place overall in the competition.

Athlete	Event	Run 1		Run 2		Total	
Athlete	Event	Time	Rank	Time	Rank	Time	Rank
Élise Pellegrin	Women's giant slalom	DSQ					
Élise Pellegrin	Women's slalom	1:05.18	56	58.90	45	2:04.08	50

== See also ==
- Malta at the 2018 Summer Youth Olympics
