= Mohamed Meridja =

Algerian judoka (born 1960)

Personal information
- Born: 19 September 1960 (age 64)
- Occupation: Judoka

Sport
- Country: Algeria
- Sport: Judo
- Weight class: Men's 65 kg
- Rank: 8th dan black belt

Achievements and titles
- Olympic Games: R32 (1988)
- World Champ.: R16 (1987)

Profile at external databases
- IJF: 4280
- JudoInside.com: 20015
- Updated on 10 March 2023

Mohamed Meridja (born 19 September 1960) is an Algerian judoka. He competed in the men's lightweight event at the 1988 Summer Olympics.
