= Marc Alexandre =

French judoka (born 1959)

Personal information
- Born: 30 October 1959 (age 66)
- Occupation: Judoka

Sport
- Country: France
- Sport: Judo
- Weight class: ‍–‍65 kg, ‍–‍71 kg

Achievements and titles
- Olympic Games: (gold) (1988)
- World Champ.: (silver) (1987)
- European Champ.: (gold) (1984)
Medal record
Men's judo
Representing France
Olympic Games
| Gold medal – first place | 1988 Seoul | ‍–‍71 kg |
| Bronze medal – third place | 1984 Los Angeles | ‍–‍65 kg |
World Championships
| Silver medal – second place | 1987 Essen | ‍–‍71 kg |
European Championships
| Gold medal – first place | 1984 Liege | ‍–‍65 kg |
| Silver medal – second place | 1985 Hamar | ‍–‍65 kg |
| Bronze medal – third place | 1986 Belgrade | ‍–‍65 kg |
| Bronze medal – third place | 1989 Helsinki | ‍–‍71 kg |

Profile at external databases
- IJF: 3790
- JudoInside.com: 5033
- Updated on 6 June 2023

Marc Alexandre (born 30 October 1959) is a retired judoka from France, who represented his native country at two consecutive Summer Olympics (1984 and 1988). He was born in Paris.

Alexandre won the bronze medal in the men's half-lightweight division (‍–‍65 kg), alongside Austria's Josef Reiter, at the 1984 Summer Olympics in Los Angeles, California, followed by the gold medal, four years later in Seoul, South Korea in the lightweight category (‍–‍71 kg) by defeating East Germany's Sven Loll in the final.
