= Giorgi Tenadze =

Georgian judoka (born 1962)

Personal information
- Born: 24 May 1962 (age 64)
- Occupation: Judoka

Sport
- Country: Soviet Union
- Sport: Judo
- Weight class: ‍–‍71 kg

Achievements and titles
- Olympic Games: (bronze) (1988)
- World Champ.: (bronze) (1989)
- European Champ.: (bronze) (1989)
Medal record
Men's judo
Representing Soviet Union
Olympic Games
Bronze medal – third place	1988 Seoul	‍–‍71 kg
World Championships
Bronze medal – third place	1989 Belgrade	‍–‍71 kg
European Championships
Bronze medal – third place	1989 Helsinki	‍–‍71 kg
Summer Universiade
Bronze medal – third place	1985 Kobe	‍–‍71 kg

Profile at external databases
- IJF: 799
- JudoInside.com: 5908
- Updated on 6 June 2023

Giorgi Tenadze (Georgian: გიორგი თენაძე) (born 24 May 1962 in Gori) is a Georgian judoka who competed for the Soviet Union in the 1988 Summer Olympics, where he won a bronze medal in the lightweight class.

Tenadze is bronze medalist for the Soviet team in 1988 as well as a bronze medalist from the 1989 World Championships in Belgrade.
