= Ju Hsiang-hung =

Taiwanese judoka

Personal information
- Full name: 茹 向弘, Pinyin: Rú Xiàng-hóng
- Nationality: Taiwanese
- Born: 30 August 1967 (age 57)

Sport
- Sport: Judo

Ju Hsiang-hung (born 30 August 1967) is a Taiwanese judoka. He competed in the men's lightweight event at the 1988 Summer Olympics.
