= James Sibenge =

Zimbabwean judoka (born 1966)

Personal information
- Nationality: Zimbabwean
- Born: 10 June 1966 (age 59)

Sport
- Sport: Judo

James Sibenge (born 10 June 1966) is a Zimbabwean judoka. He competed in the men's lightweight event at the 1988 Summer Olympics.
