= Malta at the 1928 Summer Olympics =

- IOC code: MLT
- NOC: Malta Olympic Committee
- Website: www.nocmalta.org

in Amsterdam
- Competitors: 9 in 1 sport
- Medals: Gold 0 Silver 0 Bronze 0 Total 0

Summer Olympics appearances (overview)
- 1928; 1932; 1936; 1948; 1952–1956; 1960; 1964; 1968; 1972; 1976; 1980; 1984; 1988; 1992; 1996; 2000; 2004; 2008; 2012; 2016; 2020; 2024

Malta competed in the Summer Olympic Games for the first time at the 1928 Summer Olympics in Amsterdam, Netherlands. Nine water polo players represented Malta.

== Water polo ==
=== Men's tournament ===
Roster

- Richard Fiorini Lowell (captain)
- Harry Bonavia
- Meme Busietta
- Victor Busietta
- Louis Darmanin
- Edoardo Magri
- Francisco Nappa
- Victor Pace
- Turu Rizzo
- Roger Vella

Round of 16

Malta	3–1	Luxembourg

Quarterfinals

France	16–0	Malta
