= John Bugeja =

Maltese cyclist

Personal information
- Born: 1 December 1932
- Died: 2 October 1999 (aged 66)

Cycling career
- Sport: Cycling

John Bugeja (1 December 1932 – 2 October 1999) was a Maltese cyclist. He competed in the individual road race and team time trial events at the 1960 Summer Olympics.
