= Daniel Dohou Dossou =

Beninese judoka

Personal information
- Nationality: Beninese
- Born: 30 September 1959 (age 65)

Sport
- Sport: Judo

Daniel Dohou Dossou (born 30 September 1959) is a Beninese judoka. He competed in the men's lightweight event at the 1988 Summer Olympics.
