= Gail Rizzo =

Maltese swimmer and coach

Personal information
- National team: Malta
- Born: 2 February 1979 (age 46)
- Occupation: Swimming coach

Sport
- Sport: Swimming
- Events: 50m freestyle; 100m freestyle; 100m backstroke; 200m backstroke

Gail Rizzo (born 2 February 1979) is a Maltese former swimmer and current swimming coach who represented Malta at the 1996 Summer Olympic Games.

== Career ==
At the 1996 Summer Olympic Games Rizzo finished 50th out of 55 competitors in the women's 50m freestyle in a time of 28.43 seconds, 48th and last in the women's 100m freestyle with a time of 1:02.19 and 33rd out of 36 in the women's 100m backstroke with a time of 1:07.61.

Rizzo set a national record of 2:25.66 in the 200m backstroke in May 1997. The record lasted until 2019.

She later became head coach of Neptunes WPSC.
