= Joaquín Ruiz (judoka) =

Spanish judoka

Personal information
- Nationality: Spanish
- Born: 12 January 1959 (age 67) Madrid, Spain

Sport
- Sport: Judo

Joaquín Ruiz Llorente (born 12 January 1959) is a Spanish judoka. He competed at the 1984, 1988 and the 1992 Summer Olympics.
