= Joseph Polidano =

Maltese cyclist

Personal information
- Born: 8 June 1940 (age 86)

Cycling career
- Sport: Cycling

Joseph Polidano (born 8 June 1940) is a former Maltese cyclist. He competed in the individual road race and team time trial events at the 1960 Summer Olympics.
