= Ryan Gambin =

Maltese swimmer

Personal information
- Full name: Ryan Gambin
- National team: Malta
- Born: 23 May 1985 (age 41) Southport, Queensland, Australia
- Height: 1.89 m (6 ft 2 in)
- Weight: 90 kg (198 lb)

Sport
- Sport: Swimming
- Strokes: Butterfly
- Club: Southport Olympic Pool
- Coach: Glen Baker

Ryan Gambin (born 23 May 1985) is a swimmer who specialized in the butterfly events. Born in Australia, he represented Malta internationally. He represented his parental homeland Malta at the 2008 Summer Olympics and also trained throughout his swimming career at Southport Olympic Pool Club in Southport, Queensland, Australia, under the tutelage of head coach Glen Baker.

Gambin had ascended to prominence in the international scene at the 2008 European Championships in Eindhoven, Netherlands, competing as a member of the Maltese squad. There, he finished thirtieth in the men's 100 m butterfly with a time of 54.33 seconds to clear a FINA B-cut and earn a place on his first ever Olympic team. Leading up to the Games, Gambin continued to set four more national records in some of his specialty events at Luxembourg Open, and three more at the Paris EDF Open.

At the 2008 Summer Olympics in Beijing, Gambin competed for Malta in the men's 100 m butterfly. Swimming on the outside lane in heat four, Gambin maintained an impressive run throughout the race, as he lowered again his lifetime best and Maltese record to 53.70 seconds on a tech bodysuit to finish sixth and forty-eighth overall on the evening prelims, but his most satisfying mark was not enough to put him through to the top 16.

After the Olympics, Gambin retired from his swimming career, and returned to Australia to work as a personal trainer and fitness instructor in the Gold Coast.
