= Albert Micallef =

Maltese cyclist

Personal information
- Born: 23 November 1958 (age 67)

Cycling career
- Sport: Cycling

Albert Micallef (born 23 November 1958) is a Maltese former cyclist. He competed in the individual road race and team time trial events at the 1980 Summer Olympics.
