= Anders Dahlin =

Swedish judoka

Personal information
- Nationality: Swedish
- Born: 5 April 1965 (age 59); Sundsvall, Sweden
- Occupation: Judoka

Sport
- Sport: Judo

Anders Dahlin (born 5 April 1965) is a Swedish judoka. He competed at the 1988 Summer Olympics and the 1992 Summer Olympics.
