= John Tabone =

Maltese swimmer

Personal information
- Full name: John Tabone
- National team: Malta
- Born: 4 May 1980 (age 46)
- Height: 1.74 m (5 ft 9 in)
- Weight: 65 kg (143 lb)

Sport
- Sport: Swimming
- Strokes: Individual medley

John Tabone (born 4 May 1980) is a Maltese former swimmer, who held 12 out of 17 national records and over 40 age group records specialized in the individual medley events. Tabone qualified only for the men's 400 m individual medley at the 2000 Summer Olympics in Sydney by receiving a Universality place from FINA, in an entry time of 5:00.00. He challenged four other swimmers in heat one, including Hong Kong's Alex Fong, who turned into one of his country's popular singers, and Tunisia's 16-year-old Oussama Mellouli, who later became an Olympic champion in long-distance freestyle (2008) and open water (2012). He rounded out a small field to place 45th in a time of 4:53.12, way off the time he had obtained in the Commonwealth Games that were held in Malaysia in 1998 of 4.48.36. He had made it to the B final and placed 15th overall in that event.Tabone failed to reach the top 8 final, as he placed forty-fifth overall in the prelims.

John Tabone also known as Jon Jon was also Malta swimmer of the year 6 times.

In 1995, he was the first Maltese in history to be given an I.O.C Swimming Scholarship In Jacksonvile Florida at Bolles School.

John took part in the 2018 European Masters championships that were held in Slovenia. After an absence of 18 years from the sport of Swimming he took part in the 50m Butterfly and at the age of 38 he clocked 28.74 coming 6th overall in the 1980 category in Europe and 16th out of 52 participants in the 35-39 age group.

During The Masters European championships held in Rome age group 40 - 44, John managed to swim the 50m Butterfly and 50m Breastroke in 27.89 and 32.32 respectively. He placed in the top 11th out of 46 in the fly and 10th out of 40 in the breast. Also note mentioning he placed 3rd and 2nd in the 1980 age group both of which are National Masters records.

In 2026 John broke 2 National Masters records in the age group 45–49 years old. He swam the 50m Butterfly in 29.05 and the 50m Breastroke in 32.93. At the European Masters Championships John took part in 2 events. He broke the National Masters record in both the 50m Breastroke and 50m Butterfly. He swam the 50m Breastroke in 32.29 and placed 6th out of 30 and 10th out of 34 in the 50m Butterfly in a time of 28.83.

He is Sliema ASC's Swimming Masters coach following in the footsteps of his late Grandfather Frankie Tabone and his Father John Tabone SNr.
