= Carmel Muscat =

Maltese cyclist (1961–2025)

Personal information
- Born: 1 November 1961
- Died: 29 July 2025 (aged 63) Msida, Malta

Cycling career
- Sport: Cycling

Carmel Muscat (Maltese: Karmenu Muscat; 1 November 1961 – 29 July 2025) was a Maltese cyclist. He competed in the individual road race and team time trial events at the 1980 Summer Olympics.

== Biography ==
Muscat was a resident of Naxxar, and he worked as a driving instructor with Malta Public Transport.

At around 13:45 on 29 July 2025, Muscat got trapped between the side of a Mercedes Citaro bus and a wall at the Floriana Park & Ride after the empty vehicle moved on its own while parked. He was taken to Mater Dei Hospital, and he died of his injuries shortly afterwards.
