= Park Jeong-hui =

South Korean judoka

Personal information
- Nationality: South Korean
- Born: 3 October 1966 (age 58)

Korean name
- Hangul: 박정희
- Hanja: 朴正熙
- RR: Bak Jeonghui
- MR: Pak Chŏnghŭi
- IPA: [pɐk̚.tɕʌŋçi]

Sport
- Sport: Judo

Park Jeong-hui (born 3 October 1966) is a South Korean judoka. He competed in the men's lightweight event at the 1988 Summer Olympics.

Park attended Keisung High School, and competed for his school at the 22nd President's Cup Judo Championships in Seoul, where he won a gold medal in the 71 kg class. He went on to attend Korea Physical Science College (now Yong In University), and represented South Korea in judo at the 1985 Summer Universiade and the Shōriki Cup tournament while a student there.
