= Sven Loll =

East German judoka

Personal information
- Born: 4 April 1964 (age 62) East Berlin, East Germany
- Occupation: Judoka

Sport
- Country: East Germany
- Sport: Judo
- Weight class: –‍71 kg

Achievements and titles
- Olympic Games: (silver) (1988)
- World Champ.: 9th (1987)
- European Champ.: (silver) (1988)
Medal record
Men's judo
Representing East Germany
Olympic Games
Silver medal – second place	1988 Seoul	‍–‍71 kg
European Championships
Silver medal – second place	1988 Pamplona	‍–‍71 kg
Bronze medal – third place	1987 Paris	‍–‍71 kg
European Junior Championships
Silver medal – second place	1983 Arnhem	‍–‍71 kg
Silver medal – second place	1984 Cadiz	‍–‍71 kg

Profile at external databases
- IJF: 638
- JudoInside.com: 5606
- Updated on 6 June 2023

Sven Loll (born 4 April 1964 in East Berlin) is a male retired judoka from Germany, who competed for East Germany at the 1988 Summer Olympics in Seoul, South Korea. There he won the silver medal in the Men's Lightweight (‍–‍71 kg) division after being defeated in the final by France's Marc Alexandre.
