= Hugo d'Assunção =

Portuguese judoka (born 1958)

Personal information
- Nationality: Portuguese
- Born: 8 November 1958 (age 66); Lisbon, Portugal
- Occupation: Judoka

Sport
- Sport: Judo

Hugo d'Assunção (born 8 November 1958) is a Portuguese judoka. He competed at the 1984 Summer Olympics and the 1988 Summer Olympics.
