= Nicola Muscat =

Maltese swimmer

Personal information
- Nationality: Maltese
- Born: 25 June 1994 (age 30); Żebbuġ, Malta
- Height: 173 cm (5 ft 8 in)
- Weight: 59 kg (130 lb)

Sport
- Sport: Swimming
- Club: Sirens Swimming; Neptunes Water Polo Sports Club

Nicola Muscat (born 25 June 1994) is a Maltese swimmer. She competed in the women's 50m freestyle at the 2012 and 2016 Summer Olympics in London, finishing with a time of 27.22 and 26.60 seconds in the heats, respectively.
