= Élise Pellegrin =

Maltese-French alpine skier (born 1991)

Personal information
- Born: 7 May 1991 (age 35) Blois, France
- Height: 162 cm (5 ft 4 in)
- Weight: 58 kg (128 lb)

Sport
- Country: Malta

Élise Pellegrin (born 7 May 1991) is a Maltese-French alpine skier who has competed since 2006. Pellegrin was born in Blois, France, and qualified to compete for Malta at the 2014 Winter Olympics in Sochi, becoming the first Winter Olympian to represent the country. Although Pellegrin was born in France, her great-grandfather had moved to France from Malta, which gave her the opportunity to compete for the country. Pellegrin was also the flagbearer for Malta at the opening ceremony.

In the giant slalom, Pellegrin completed the first run in 1:36.85 to finish 72nd from 88 starters. In the second run, she recorded a slightly faster time of 1:36.27 for an aggregate time of 3:13.12 that enabled her to climb up the rankings and finish 65th of the 67 skiers who completed both runs.

In her preferred discipline, the slalom, Pellegrin completed the opening run in 1:07.10 to finish 52nd from 86 starters. She then showed a remarkable improvement in her second run, completing the course in 1:02.73 for an overall 2:09.83. This lifted her in the final standings to 42nd out of 49 skiers who completed both runs.

== See also ==
- Malta at the 2014 Winter Olympics
- Malta at the 2018 Winter Olympics
