= Peter Bonello =

Maltese windsurfer

Personal information
- Nationality: Maltese
- Born: 3 July 1961 (age 64)

Sport
- Sport: Windsurfing

Peter Bonello (born 3 July 1961) is a Maltese windsurfer. He competed in the Windglider event at the 1984 Summer Olympics.
