= Christopher Dowling =

Maltese swimmer (1944–2022)

Personal information
- Born: 15 June 1944 Sliema, Malta
- Died: 21 December 2022 (aged 78)

Sport
- Sport: Swimming

Christopher Dowling (15 June 1944 – 21 December 2022) was a Maltese swimmer. He competed in the men's 100 metre freestyle at the 1960 Summer Olympics.

While at school, Dowling competed in many sporting disciplines, but it was water polo and swimming that he would excel in for his country, he was only sixteen years old when he was picked to represent Malta at the 1960 Summer Olympics, in Rome, he competed in the men's 100 metre freestyle, unfortunately Dowling's time in the heats was the slowest of all 52 swimmers. Dowling also made a name for himself in water polo, he mainly played for Balluta WPC, and in 1963 he represented his country at the Mediterranean Games which were held in Naples, Italy. After breaking various 100 metre swimming records and winning five water polo league titles and five national cup titles he finished playing in 1973.

Dowling finished his education in 1974 at the St Michael's Teacher Training College and went on to become a teacher. During his retirement he continued to give private lessons.

Christopher wasn't the only family member to play water polo in Malta, his father Jimmy and his uncles Budgy and Ralph Dowling all played for Valletta United W.P.C.
