= Jason Trevisan =

Maltese judoka

Personal information
- Nationality: Maltese
- Born: 3 January 1967 (age 58)

Sport
- Sport: Judo

Jason Trevisan (born 3 January 1967) is a Maltese judoka. He competed at the 1988 Summer Olympics and the 1992 Summer Olympics. An eight-time medalist at the Games of the Small States of Europe, he has been described as a "legend" of Maltese judo.
