= Sasha Gatt =

Maltese swimmer

Personal information
- Nationality: Maltese
- Born: 22 June 2005 (age 21)

Sport
- Sport: Swimming
Medal record
Women's swimming
Representing Malta
Games of the Small States of Europe
Gold medal – first place	2025 Andorra la Vella	400 m freestyle
Gold medal – first place	2025 Andorra la Vella	800 m freestyle
Silver medal – second place	2025 Andorra la Vella	1500 m freestyle
Bronze medal – third place	2019 Montenegro	4×200 m freestyle

Sasha Gatt (born 22 June 2005) is a Maltese swimmer. She competed at the 2020 Summer Olympics in Women's 400 m freestyle, and Women's 1500 m freestyle. She also competed in the women's 1500 metre freestyle event at the 2020 European Aquatics Championships, in Budapest, Hungary.

== Career ==
=== 2020 Olympic Games ===
On the 12 December 2020, Gatt qualified at age 15 for the 2020 Tokyo Summer Olympics for the 1500m freestyle race with a time of 17:00.28. Later, on the 6 June 2021 Sasha Gatt also qualified for the 400m freestyle race at a time of 4:18.58.

Gatt was in heat 2, lane 7 for the 400m freestyle race. With the time of 4:19.75, she finished 6th in her heat and 22nd in the event. The next day, she swam in the women's 1500m freestyle race. Gatt finished third out of three in her heat, with a time of 16:57.47, which was her PB.

=== 2024 Olympic Games ===
In July 2024, Gatt was one of five athletes who represented Malta during the 2024 Paris Olympics. She together with Gianluca Chetcuti carried the Maltese flag during the opening ceremony. She competed in the 1500m freestyle heats at the Paris Olympics and later tested positive for COVID-19. She finished a distant third with a time of 17.00.54.
