= Joanna Agius =

Maltese archer (born 1958)

Personal information
- Nationality: Malta
- Born: 25 June 1958 (age 66)
- Height: 1.70 m (5 ft 7 in)
- Weight: 61 kg (134 lb)

Sport
- Sport: Archery

Joanna Jane Agius (born 25 June 1958) is a Maltese archer. She competed in the 1980, 1984, and 1988 Summer Olympics. She was the first woman to represent Malta at the Olympics.

At the three summer Olympics she competed in, Agius did not progress further than the individual qualification round in archery. At the 1988 Summer Olympics, Agius also served as a flagbearer for Malta.

In 2009, Agius was a coach for the Maltese seven-a-side football team at the Special Olympics European tournament for the sport.
