= Joseph Grech (sport shooter) =

Maltese sports shooter

Personal information
- Born: 26 March 1935 Malta
- Died: 18 July 2011 (aged 76)

Sport
- Sport: Sports shooting

Joseph "Peppi" Grech (26 March 1935 – 18 July 2011) was a Maltese sports shooter. He competed at the 1960, 1968 and 1972 Summer Olympics.
