= Laurie Pace =

Maltese judoka

Laurie Pace (born 9 February 1966) is a former judoka from Malta, who competed for her native country at three consecutive Summer Olympics, starting in 1992. Her best performance was winning the bronze medal at the 1990 Commonwealth Games in New Zealand.
