= Malta at the 2012 European Athletics Championships =

Malta competed at the 2012 European Athletics Championships held in Helsinki, Finland, between 27 June to 1 July 2012. 2 competitors, 1 man and 1 woman took part in 4 events.

== Results ==
=== Men ===
Track events

Event	Athletes	Heat		Semifinal		Final	
Event	Athletes	Result	Rank	Result	Rank	Result	Rank
100 m	Rachid Chouhal	10.86	30	did not advance			
200 m	Rachid Chouhal	DNF		did not advance			

=== Women ===
Track events

Event	Athletes	Heat		Semifinal		Final	
Event	Athletes	Result	Rank	Result	Rank	Result	Rank
100 m	Diane Borg	12.14	30	did not advance			
200 m	Diane Borg	24.68	29	did not advance			
