= William Chetcuti =

Maltese sport shooter (born 1985)

Personal information
- Born: 7 January 1985 (age 41) Pietà, Malta
Medal record
Men's shooting
Representing Malta
Games of the Small States of Europe
Gold medal – first place	2003 Malta	Double trap
Silver medal – second place	2019 Montenegro	Trap
Silver medal – second place	2019 Montenegro	Double trap
Commonwealth Games
Bronze medal – third place	2002 Manchester	Double Trap
Bronze medal – third place	2006 Melbourne	Double Trap

William Chetcuti (born 7 January 1985) is a Maltese sport shooter who specializes in the double trap. He won the 2011 World Cup event in Beijing and the 2004 European Junior Championship where he set what is still a world record. He was the first Maltese shooter to win a World Cup medal.

At the 2004 Olympic Games he finished in joint sixth place in the double trap qualification. Following a shoot-off he finished ninth, missing out on a place among the top six, who progressed to the final round. He was the flag bearer at the opening ceremony.

He won a bronze medal at both the 2002 and 2006 Commonwealth Games.

He then finished sixth at the 2008 World Championships. At the 2008 Olympic Games, he again finished in joint sixth place in the double trap qualification. Following a shoot-off he finished eighth.

William claimed gold at the Double Trap Men Final in 2011, finishing on the highest step of the podium with a total score of 185 targets. He also won Malta's first Olympic quota place in any sport and has participated in the London 2012 Olympic Games, finishing in ninth. He was also the Maltese flagbearer at these Games.

Maltese double trap shooter William Chetcuti won a gold medal in the 2013 Mediterranean Games. This was the first gold medal in any event for Malta since Malta started participating in these games.

Chetcuti took up shooting at the age of 10, being introduced to the sport by his father and grandfather.

Current world records held in double trap
Junior Men	Individual	142	James Willett (AUS); Andrea Galesso (ITA)	March 24, 2015; May 1, 2016	Al Ain (UAE); Suhl (GER)

Olympic Games
Preceded by Marcon Bezzina	Flagbearer for Malta; London 2012	Succeeded by Andrew Chetcuti
