= Malta at the 2010 European Athletics Championships =

Sporting event delegation

Malta was represented by 2 athletes at the 2010 European Athletics Championships held in Barcelona, Spain.

== Participants ==
Event	Men	Women
100 m	Mario Bonello	
Long Jump		Rebecca Camilleri

== Results ==
2010 Barcelona	Gold	Silver	Bronze	Total
Malta (MLT)	0	0	0	0
