= Malta Amateur Athletic Association =

National sport governing body

- Sport: Athletics
- Abbreviation: MAAA
- Founded: 1928
- Affiliation: World Athletics
- Regional affiliation: EAA and AASSE
- Headquarters: Marsa
- President: Mr Andy Grech
- Secretary: Mr Raymond Scicluna

Official website
- athleticsmalta.com
- (Malta)

The Malta Amateur Athletic Association is the governing body for the sport of athletics in Malta. Matthew Micallef St John Athletics Stadium in Marsa is the home of Maltese Athletics. The objectives for which the Association is established are to encourage, promote, develop and control athletics in Malta amongst all as a means of promoting physical health and well-being.

== Affiliations ==
- International Association of Athletics Federations (IAAF)
- European Athletic Association (EAA)
- Malta Olympic Committee

== National records ==
MAAA maintains the Maltese records in athletics.
