= Maltese Olympic Committee =

National Olympic Committee

- Country: Malta
- [[|]]
- Code: MLT
- Created: 1928
- Recognized: 1936
- Continental Association: EOC
- Headquarters: Gzira, Malta
- President: Julian Pace Bonello
- Secretary General: Joseph Cassar
- Website: nocmalta.org

The Maltese Olympic Committee (Maltese: Kumitat Olimpiku Malti; IOC Code: MLT) is the National Olympic Committee representing Malta. It is also the governing body responsible for Malta's representation at :

- the Olympic Games, Summer and Winter
- the Youth Olympic Games, Summer and Winter
- the Commonwealth Games,
- the European Games,
- the Mediterranean Games,
- the Games of the Small States of Europe and
- the European Youth Olympic Festival, Summer and Winter.

== History ==
The Maltese Olympic Committee was founded on June 5, 1928 in Valletta and recognized by the International Olympic Committee in 1936.

== List of presidents ==
The following is a list of presidents of the Malta Olympic Committee since its creation in 1928.

President	Term
Anthony Cassar Torregiani	1928–1938
Paul Giorgio	1946–1960
Alfred P. Briffa	1960–1967
Victor Pace	1968–1973
Laurence Xuereb	1973–1977
Carm A. Borg	1977–1989
Gino Camilleri	1989–1999
Lino Farrugia Sacco	1999–2013
Julian Pace Bonello	2013–present

== Executive committee ==
The current executive committee of the MOC is represented by:

- President: Julian Pace Bonello
- Vice President: William Beck
- Secretary General: Joseph Cassar
- Finance Director: David Azzopardi
- Director of Sport: Ivan Balzan
- Directors: Lucienne Attard, Kirill Micallef Stafrace, Charlene Attard, Mario Micallef, Jonathan Vella, Paul Sultana, Maria Vella-Galea

== Member federations ==
The Maltese National Federations are the organisations that coordinate all aspects of their individual sports. They are responsible for training, competition and development of their sports. There are currently 28 Olympic Summer Sport Federations in Malta.

National Federation	Summer or Winter	Headquarters
Archery Association of Malta	Summer	Swieqi
Malta Athletics Federation	Summer	Marsa
Aquatic Sports Association of Malta	Summer	Gżira
Badminton Association of Malta	Summer	Valletta
Malta Baseball and Softball association	Summer	Marsa
Malta Basketball Association	Summer	Ta' Qali
Malta Boxing Federation	Summer	St Julian's
Malta Canoe Federation	Summer	San Ġwann
Malta Cycling Federation	Summer	Pembroke
Malta Equestrian Federation	Summer	Burmarrad
National Fencing Association of Malta	Summer	Birkirkara
Malta Football Association	Summer	Ta' Qali
Malta Golf Association	Summer	Marsa
Malta Gymnastics Federation	Summer	Buġibba
Malta Handball Association	Summer	Msida
Hockey Association of Malta	Summer	Balzan
Malta Judo Federation	Summer	Ta' Xbiex
Malta Karate Federation	Summer	Pembroke
Malta Rugby Football Union	Summer	Marsa
Malta Sailing Federation	Summer	Naxxar
Malta Shooting Federation	Summer	Bidnija
Malta Table Tennis Association	Summer	Valletta
Malta Taekwondo Federation	Summer	Valletta
Malta Tennis Federation	Summer	Valletta
Malta Triathlon Federation	Summer	Gżira
Federation of Underwater Activities of Malta	Summer	Sliema
Malta Volleyball Association	Summer	Cospicua
Malta Weightlifting Association	Summer	Marsaskala

== See also ==
- Malta at the Olympics
- Malta at the Commonwealth Games
