= Water polo in Malta =

Water polo is one of the most popular sports in Malta, with the level of clubs being quite high.

Maltese Water polo is administered by the Aquatic Sports Association of Malta, with a respective section dedicated to this sport. Water polo activities are sponsored by Bank of Valletta.

== History ==
Water polo was played in Malta at the turn of the 20th century, and was already a well-contested sport in the 1920s, when Lord Plumer, then Governor of Malta, thought about the possibility of entering a Maltese team in the 1924 Summer Olympics. Eventually Lord Plumer left his post but the Maltese enterprised through the Aquatic Sports Association of Malta, then called Amateur Swimmers Association. This was refused by the Dutch organising them on the grounds that Malta was not a country, and after a legal battle ensued for Malta to be able to accede, Malta entered the 1928 Summer Olympics. This process also led to the creation of the Malta Olympic Committee.

== Clubs ==
Previously there were much more teams, and there was even a league system specific to Gozo only. Currently the clubs are:

Club	City	Division
Barracudas S.C.	San Pawl il-Baħar	Maltese Water polo First Division
Birzebbuga A.S.C.	Birżebbuġa	Maltese Water polo First Division
Exiles S.C.	Sliema	Maltese Water polo Premier Division
Marsaskala S.C.	Marsaskala	Maltese Water polo First Division
Marsaxlokk A.S.C.	Marsaxlokk	Maltese Water polo First Division
Neptunes WPSC	St. Julian's	Maltese Water polo Premier Division
Otters A.S.C.	Żebbuġ, Gozo	Maltese Water polo First Division
San Giljan A.S.C.	St. Julian's	Maltese Water polo Premier Division
Sirens A.S.C.	San Pawl il-Baħar	Maltese Water polo Premier Division
Sliema A.S.C.	Sliema	Maltese Water polo Premier Division
Ta' Xbiex W.C.	Ta' Xbiex	Maltese Water polo First Division
Valletta United W.P.C.	Valletta	Maltese Water polo Premier Division

== Domestic League ==
The Maltese Water polo league currently features 12 teams in two divisions:

- Maltese Waterpolo Premier Division - 6 teams
- Maltese Waterpolo First Division - 6 teams

== National team ==
Malta has qualified for the 2016 Men's European Water Polo Championship and the 2018 Men's European Water Polo Championship.
