= Sport in Malta =

Sports in Malta include association football, basketball, athletics, rugby, tennis, cycling, and others.

== Football ==
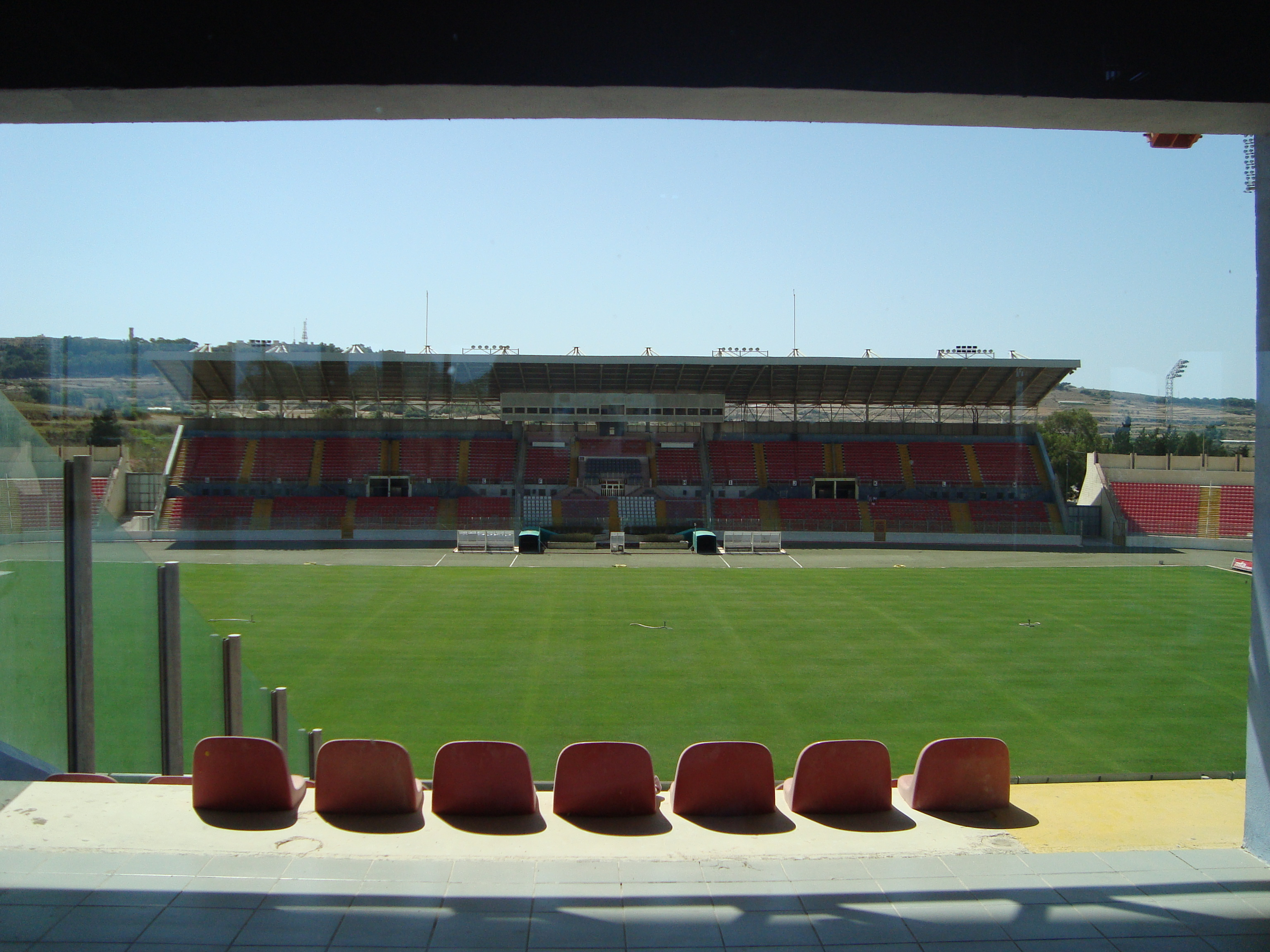
The Ta' Qali National Stadium is the home ground of the Malta national football team

Association football (soccer) is the most popular sport in Malta. The national stadium is called Ta' Qali Stadium. The national football team has won several matches over big opponents that reached the final phases in World Cups, such as Belgium and Hungary. Recently a large number of football grounds have been built throughout the island. The top football league in Malta is called the Maltese Premier League, and consists of 14 teams. Futsal is also very popular.

== Watersports ==
Malta is a suitable destination for surfing, offering a wide variety of surf spots. During winter time most of the beaches are popular surfer hangouts.

== Waterpolo ==
Water polo is also very popular in Malta. The Malta men's national water polo team has achieved some great results against strong teams, and has competed in the Olympics twice. Maltese clubs participate in the European Club competitions organised by LEN, are seen as being in the top 10 water polo leagues in Europe.

== Boċċi ==
Boċċi is the Maltese version of the Italian game of bocce, French pétanque and British bowls. Other than certain differences in rules and the ground on which the game is played, one of the most obvious differences between Maltese boċċi and foreign equivalents is the shape of the bowls themselves which tend to be cylindrical rather than spherical in shape. Many small clubs (usually called Klabbs tal-Boċċi in Maltese) can be found in Maltese and Gozitan localities, and are usually well-frequented and are quite active on a local and European level. Even the emigrants to Canada, Australia, and The United States have taken the game with them and now forms an important part of their social scene.

== Hockey ==
Maltese National Hockey League is the official field hockey league in Malta, with just 4 teams participating in the National League.

The National Hockey Stadium is located in Paola, Kordin. It is the only location with regulation facilities available in the country.

The Malta National Hockey Team occasionally participates in international fixtures.

== Rugby ==
Rugby Union has been played in Malta since the beginning of the 20th century, with evidence of rugby pitches at RAF Ta' Qali Air Field in the 1920s and other fields in RAF Luqa Air Field. The Malta Rugby Football Union was formed in 1991. 5 clubs are established in Malta - Falcons, Kavallieri, Overseas, Stompers and Wolves. In October 2021 the national men's team was ranked 41st in the world. They have recently been achieving success, defeating teams including Sweden, Croatia and Latvia. In 2018, Malta achieved its largest win against Andorra, that of 89-3. As of 2016 Malta Rugby Union had 2,480 registered players.

Rugby league is also played in Malta, primarily due to return migration of Maltese Australians bringing it back with them. In July 2022, the national men's team was ranked 10th in the world. The national team are known as the Malta Knights, and boast players currently playing in the Super League in England such as Jarrod Sammut, Jake Mamo, the most famous player to come from Malta would be former South Sydney Rabbitohs, Mario Fenech. In 2016 Malta Rugby League had 285 players, with the large majority based in Australia.

== Motorsport ==
Motorsport includes drag racing represented by the Malta Drag Racing Association, with recent high ranking Maltese dragsters in official FIA European championships. There is also autocross (ASMK), hill climb (Island Car Club), motocross, karting and banger racing championships.

== Basketball ==
In 2020, Malta got its first-ever female head coach leading a men’s Division One basketball team. It was Silvia Gambino who started the position at Mellieħa S.C. Libertas.

== Volleyball ==
Malta has a first division for women's volleyball teams. The president of the national federation MVA has been Jesmond Saliba.

== Snooker ==
Malta also hosts a snooker round, the Malta Cup, which as of 2008 became a non-ranking event. In 2008 Malta's Tony Drago was a member of a victorious European Mosconi Cup team, which was played in Portomaso, Malta. Claudio Cassar was World Blackball Champion in 2014.

== Shooting ==
The most notable Maltese shooter is William Chetcuti, who won medals at the Commonwealth Games and Mediterranean Games, and ranked in the top 8 at the Olympic Games and ISSF World Championships.

== Boxing ==
Boxer Jeff Fenech is of Maltese descent. Recently contact sports such as Boxing and Kickboxing have become increasingly popular.

== Cricket ==
Malta are an affiliate member of the ICC & has full Twenty20 International status. Home games are played at Marsa. In 2020 there was a T20 summer domestic league consisting of 12 teams, and in 2019 a 50-over winter league which comprised 5 teams.

Along with other sports, tennis is a popular activity in Malta and Gozo. The islands offer a wide range of options for both beginners and elite players. Clubs are spread out across Malta and games are being played on a regular basis all year around.

There are over 1,200 rock climbing routes in Malta. The island offers a mixture of both trad climbing and sport climbing and also offers a good variety of bouldering and deep water soloing. The geography and small size of the island makes the climbing easily accessible. The sport is growing in popularity with local communities, as well as tourists and visitors.

== Multi-sport games ==
Malta debuted at the Olympic Games in Amsterdam 1928. No Maltese competitor has won an Olympic medal.

The country has claimed seven medals at the Paralympics, seven medals at the Commonwealth Games and nine at the Mediterranean Games

== List of sports teams in Malta ==
Number	Locality	Football	Futsal	Waterpolo	Boċċi	Handball	Basketball	Rugby Union	Athletics	Regatta	Darts	Billiards	Volleyball	Hockey
1	Valletta	Valletta F.C. Valletta St. Paul's; Valletta Stars; Rovers United	Valletta Futsal Club	Valletta United W.P.C.	St. Paul's Marsamxett			Valletta Lions (defunct)		Marsamxett Valletta			Valletta V.C.	
2	Mdina	Mdina Knights F.C.	Mdina Knights Futsal											
3	Attard	Attard F.C.	Attard Futsal (defunct)											
4	Balzan	Balzan F.C.	Balzan Futsal (defunct)										Balzan V.C.	
5	Vittoriosa	Vittoriosa Stars F.C.								Birgu				
6	Birkirkara	Birkirkara F.C. Birkirkara St. Joseph; Mrieħel Devon; Fleur-de-Lys	Mrieħel ESS		Birkirkara Boċċi Club	Aloysians H.C.		Birkirkara Alligators (defunct)	Birkirkara St. Joseph				Aloysians V.C. Birkirkara V.C. Fleur-de-lys V.C.	
7	Birzebbugia	Birżebbuġa St. Peter's F.C. Birzebbugia Tigers		Birzebbuga A.S.C.	Birżebbuġa					Birżebbuġa	Birżebbuġa St. Peter BC Birżebbuġa Cox			
8	Cospicua	St. George's F.C. Cospicua Dynamos	St. George's Futsal		Cospicua Boċċi Club	De La Salle H.C.				Bormla				
9	Swieqi	Swieqi United F.C.	Swieqi United Futsal; Swieqi United U-21 Futsal			Swieqi Phoenix H.C.		Overseas RUFC					Swieqi Phoenix V.C.	
10	Lija	Lija Athletic F.C.			Lija Boċċi Club									
11	Floriana	Floriana F.C. Floriana AFC			Klabb Boċċi Floriana		Floriana Basketball Club				Floriana Ajax Floriana Bocci Club			Young Stars Hockey Club
12	Sliema	Sliema Wanderers F.C.		Sliema ASC Exiles S.C.				Stompers RFC			Sliema Inter DC			Sliema Hotsticks Hockey Club
13	Gżira	Gżira United F.C.					Gżira Athleta							
14	Paola	Hibernians F.C. Paola Kordin	Hibernians Futsal (defunct) Paola Downtown Futsal Club (defunct)				Hibernians Basketball							
15	St. Julian's	Melita F.C.	Melita Futsal (defunct)	San Giljan ASC Neptunes WPSC										
16	Senglea	Senglea Athletic F.C.								Senglea	Senglea Conquest			
17	Mosta	Mosta F.C. Mosta Vikings AFC Mosta Gunners	Mosta Futsal Club ZC Excess Futsal Club (defunct) (Bidnija)		Mosta Boċċi Club						Mosta Horseshoe			
18	Naxxar	Naxxar Lions F.C.	Naxxar Motors Futsal (defunct) Naxxar Lions FC Futsal				Starlites							
19	Ħamrun	Ħamrun Spartans F.C.	Ħamrun Spartans Futsal (defunct)								Ħamrun Education Ħamrun Bayern			
20	St. Paul's Bay	Sirens F.C.		Sirens ASC							Bugibba New Sun City Bugibba Whyte Harte			
21	Qormi	Qormi F.C. Qormi Eagles	Qormi Futsal Club		Qormi Boċċi Club St. Sebastian Boċċi Club			Kavallieri Rugby Football Club Qormi Wasps			Qormi Hockey			Qormi Hockey Club
22	Rabat	Rabat Ajax F.C.												Rabat Hockey Club
23	Żebbuġ	Żebbuġ Rangers F.C.			Żebbuġ Boċċi Klabb									
24	Marsa	Marsa F.C. Marsa St. Michael's								Marsa	Marsa Top Gun RS Marsa St. Michael			
25	Msida	Msida St. Joseph F.C.	University of Malta Students Futsal Junior College Futsal (defunct)		Msida Boċċi Club									
26	Żejtun	Żejtun Corinthians F.C.									Żejtun Domus Żejtun Lacci			
27	Pembroke	Pembroke Athleta F.C. St. Andrews F.C.	Luxol St. Andrews Futsal Club Luxol Futsal Team B (defunct)				Luxol							White Hart Hockey Club
28	Marsaskala	Marsaskala F.C.	Marsaskala Futsal Club	Marsaskala SC										Marsascala Heat Hockey Club (Juniors)
29	Gudja	Gudja United F.C.									Gudja PO's Bar			
30	Tarxien	Tarxien Rainbows F.C.	Tarxien JMI (defunct)											
31	Fgura	Fgura United F.C.									Fgura PL Club			
32	Żurrieq	Żurrieq F.C. Żurrieq Wolves	Żurrieq Futsal Club								Żurrieq F.C.			
33	Kalkara	Kalkara United F.C.								Kalkara	Kalkara St. Joseph			
34	Siġġiewi	Siġġiewi F.C.									Siġġiewi Ta' Klaricc			
35	Marsaxlokk	Marsaxlokk F.C.		Marsaxlokk ASC										
36	Qrendi	Qrendi F.C. Qrendi Sparrows AFC						Falcons RFC						
37	Mqabba	Mqabba F.C.									Mqabba St. Mary BC Mqabba Tal-Gilju			
38	Kirkop	Kirkop United F.C.												
39	Santa Luċija	Santa Lucia F.C. Santa Lucia Falcons AFC			Santa Lucija Bocci									
40	Mellieħa	Mellieħa S.C.												
41	Mtarfa	Mtarfa F.C.					Depiro							
42	Mġarr	Mġarr United F.C.												
43	Dingli	Dingli Swallows F.C.												
44	Għargħur	Għargħur F.C.												
45	San Ġwann	San Ġwann F.C.	San Ġwann Futsal (defunct)											
46	Pietà	Pietà Hotspurs F.C.	Pietà Hotspurs Futsal (defunct)											
47	Ta' Xbiex	Ta' Xbiex F.C.		Ta' Xbiex WPC										
48	Santa Venera	Santa Venera Lightnings F.C.												
49	Luqa	Luqa St. Andrews F.C.	Luqa St. Andrews Futsal (defunct)											
50	Għaxaq	Għaxaq F.C.												
51	Żabbar	Żabbar St. Patrick F.C.	Żabbar St. Patrick Futsal (defunct)											
52	Xgħajra	Xgħajra Tornados F.C.												

== See also ==
- Malta Olympic Committee
- Maltese National Regatta
- Maltese National Badminton Championships
- Malta Sailing Federation
- Handball Malta and Malta Handball Association
- Aquatic Sports Association of Malta
