= Alfred Grixti =

Maltese swimmer

Personal information
- Born: 21 April 1943 (age 83)

Sport
- Sport: Swimming

Alfred Grixti (born 21 April 1943) is a Maltese former swimmer. He competed in the men's 100 metre freestyle at the 1960 Summer Olympics, where he was eliminated after finishing last in his heat.

During his swimming career Grixti was National champion in four different events over a number of years and the highlight was competing at the 1960 Summer Olympics in Rome.

Grixti's other passion was water polo, and was classed as the undisputed best ever water polo player ever for his country, his career spanned over 20 years and won every major honour possible in his country, he made his division one debut when he was just 13 years old, he was a prolific goal scorer and an all rounder who read the game better than anyone, he represented his country at the 1963 Mediterranean Games held in Naples, and then 12 years later he captained his country at the 1975 Mediterranean Games held in Algiers, Algeria. After quitting as a player he carried on coaching for several years for Birzebbuga A.S.C. and Birzebbuga A.S.C.

In 1965 and 1972 Grixti was voted Sportsman of the Year in Malta, and in 2005, he was inducted in to the Hall of Fame of the Malta Olympic Committee.

Grixti is married to Pauline, who was also a water polo player and they had four children.
