= Royal Malta Yacht Club =

Yacht club in Malta

Coordinates: 35°53′N 14°30′E

- Burgee
- Short name: RMYC
- Location: Ta' Xbiex, Malta
- Website: www.rmyc.org

The Royal Malta Yacht Club (RMYC) is a yacht club in Ta’ Xbiex Marina, Ta' Xbiex (Malta).

== History ==
The date of the first establishment of the Royal Malta Yacht Club has not been ascertained, although there are rumours as to the existence of an obscure yacht club in Malta as far back as 1835. It is, however, on record that the Admiralty issued a warrant authorising the use of the Blue Ensign in 1873, (re-issued in 1894). By 1892 that club had reached its nadir and virtually ceased to exist.

Around 1896, a small group of gentlemen resident in Malta and owning as a syndicate a 30-ton cutter called the "RHODA", formed an association which was commonly known as the Rhoda Sailing Club At first, their interests were primarily in cruising, but later on, races were staged for sailing dinghies and small local craft, which attracted other enthusiasts who were not members of the original syndicate. From these and others, a club known as the Mediterranean Skiff Club was formed in 1905 and the 14-Foot West of England Conference Dinghy adopted as its racing class. The Mediterranean Skiff Club remained in existence until 1916 when it was wound up owing to the majority of its members being on active service.

In 1921 the club was reconstituted under the title of the Malta Yacht Club, presumably in ignorance of the Royal tradition it had inherited, and it was until 1928 that steps were taken to obtain official recognition of the prefix "Royal" - although for some years previously the Admiralty had adopted that form of address when communicating with the club. In 1929, following a successful motorboat regatta, the Malta Motor Boat Club was formed. This led in 1930 to the two clubs amalgamating under the title of the senior body, with the declared policy of providing a common meeting ground for the Maltese and English sections of the community, and to this end, the building of premises suitable to the Clubs' activities.

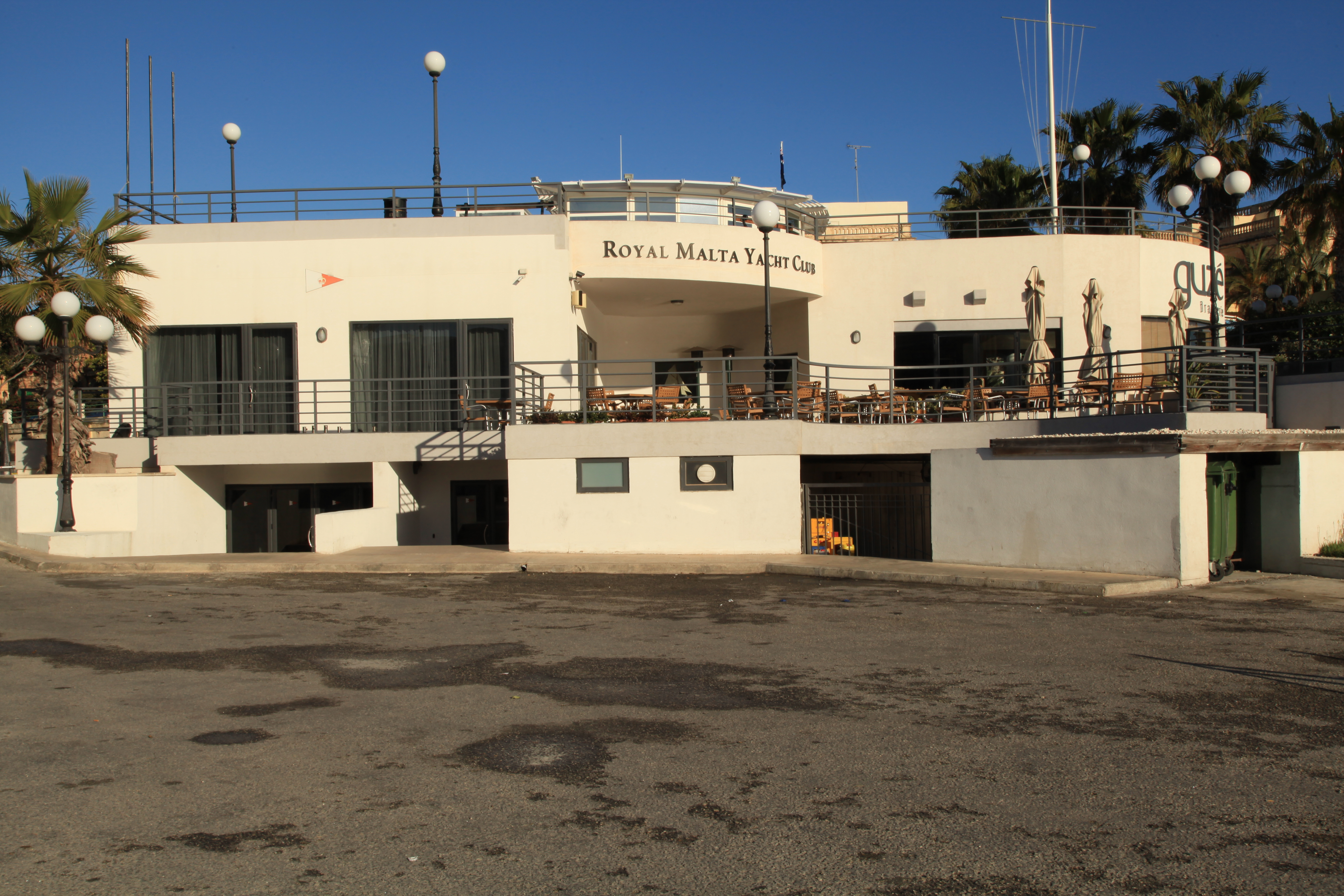
Royal Malta Yacht Club in Ta' Xbiex

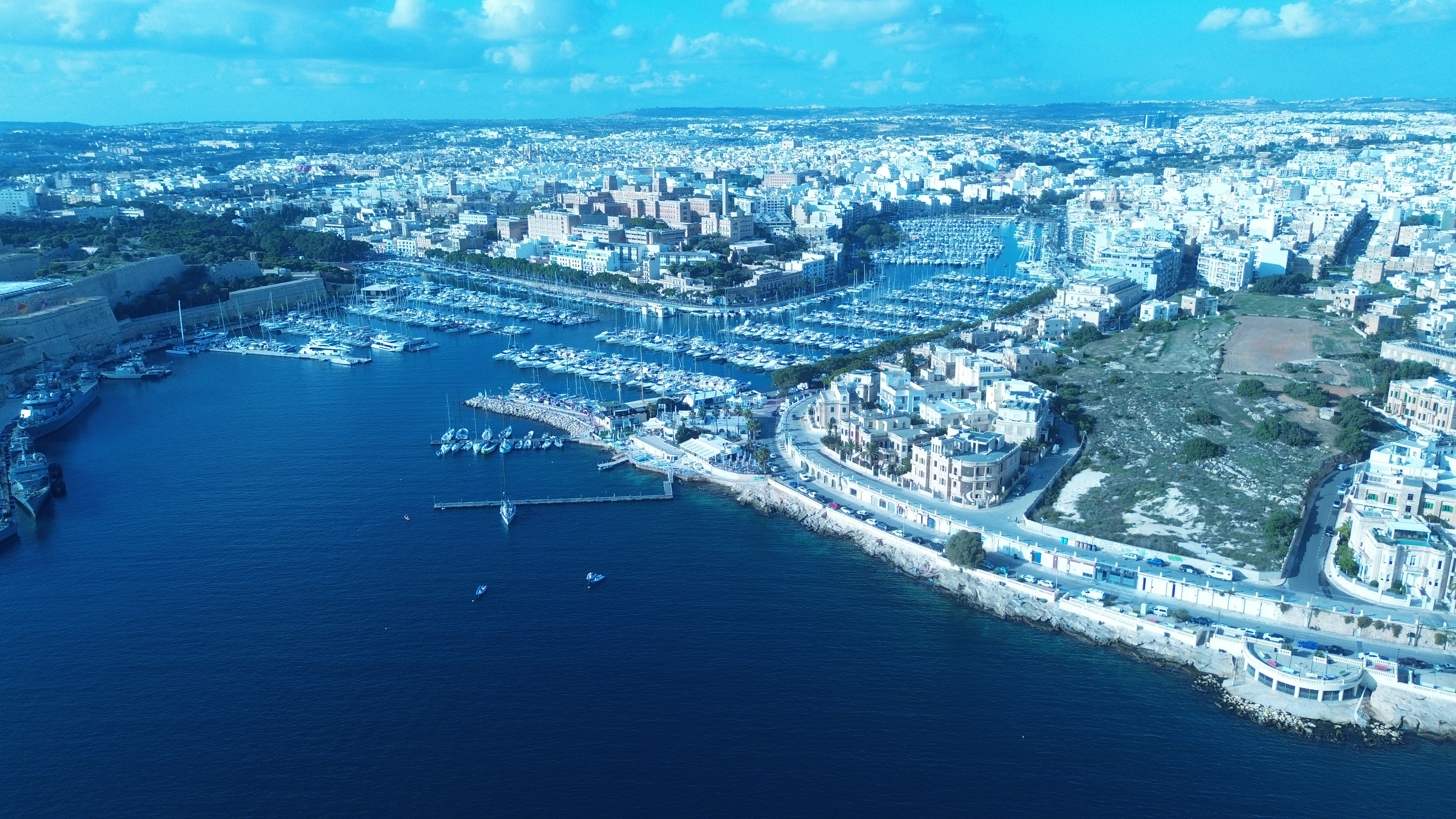
Royal Yacht Club, with Ta'Xbiex marina in the background.

The clubhouse at Hay Wharf (Floriana, Malta) was rebuilt on its former site. In 1952 Offshore races for 30- and 50-square-metre yachts were introduced, and races to various ports in Sicily, Libya and Tunisia were held regularly. In 1968 the first Middle Sea Race was sailed, and in 1987 was the start of the Rimini-Malta-Rimini race. In 1970 the club moved from Hay Wharf, Floriana, to Fort Manoel, Manoel Island. Fort Manoel, completed in 1755 by the French military engineers René Jacob de Tigné and Charles François de Mondion, has a remarkably fine design and a most impressive gate, which is clearly visible from Marsamxett Harbour; originally the complex housed some 500 soldiers. The fort also commands a superb view of Valletta and the harbour.

In 1975 the club instigated the formation of the Malta Sailing Federation with a view to such body assuming the recognition, at the time accorded to the club by the Malta Government (National Sports Board), as the National Authority and controlling body for yachting in Malta.

The burgee and British defaced blue ensign both carry the traditional Tudor crown in accordance with the club's Rules; the crown is often inaccurately illustrated.

In 2008, the commodore of the Royal Malta Yacht Club, Mr Georges Bonello DuPuis, finalised the deal with government to move out of Fort Manoel into the old Customs house in Ta' Xbiex. A bold move which proved a turning point in the club's history. He undertook a fundraising campaign and managed to renovate the run-down building to a modern yacht club with fantastic facilities, including a yacht marina, gymnasium, offices and conference rooms. The club is what it is today thanks to his firm leadership and an investment in excess of €1.5 million.
