= Norbert Hosnyánszky =

Hungarian water polo player

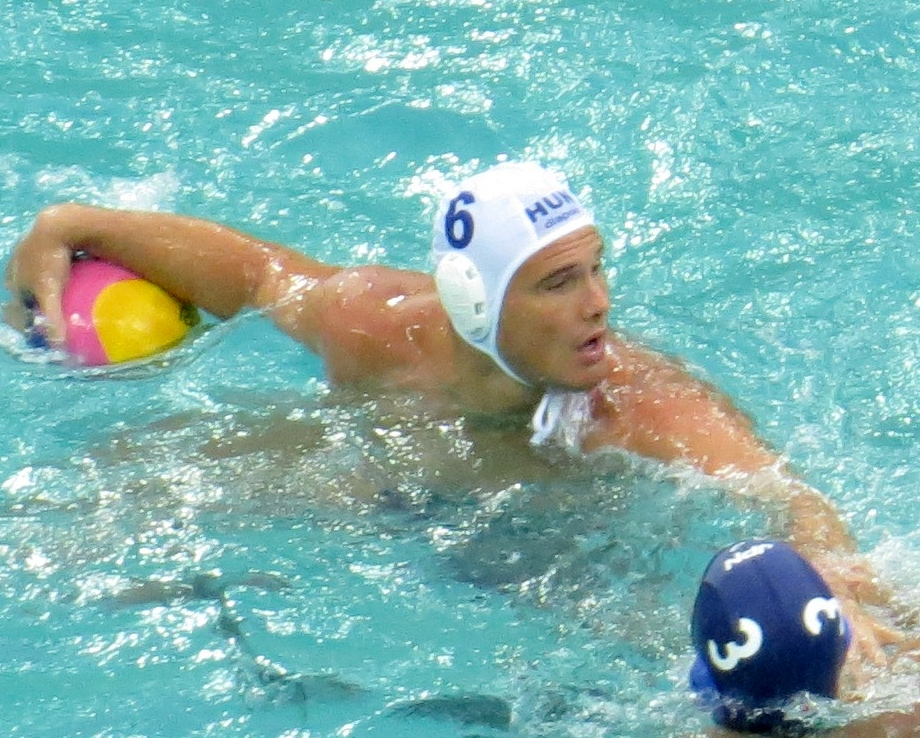
- Hosnyánszky at the 2016 Summer Olympics

Personal information
- Nickname: Hosi
- Nationality: Hungarian
- Born: 4 March 1984 (age 42) Budapest, Hungary
- Height: 1.90 m (6 ft 3 in)

Sport
- Sport: Water polo
- Handedness: Right
- Position: Driver

Youth career
- Years: Team
- –1994: BVSC
- 1994–: Ferencváros

Senior clubs
- Years: Team
- –2003: Ferencváros
- 2003–2005: Florentia
- 2005–2006: Szeged
- 2006–2007: Vasas
- 2007–2008: Florentia
- 2008–2010: Vasas
- 2010–2012: Eger
- 2012–2014: Szolnok
- 2014–2020: Eger
- 2018: → Marsaxlokk (Summer League)
- 2020–2023: Bp. Honvéd
National team
Years	Team	Apps
2005–2021	Hungary	258
Medal record
Men's water polo
Representing Hungary
Olympic Games
Gold medal – first place	2008 Beijing	Team
Bronze medal – third place	2020 Tokyo	Team
World Championships
Gold medal – first place	2013 Barcelona	Team
Silver medal – second place	2017 Budapest	Team
European Championship
Gold medal – first place	2020 Budapest	Team
Silver medal – second place	2006 Belgrade	Team
Silver medal – second place	2014 Budapest	Team
Bronze medal – third place	2008 Málaga	Team
Bronze medal – third place	2012 Eindhoven	Team
Bronze medal – third place	2016 Belgrade	Team
FINA World League
Silver medal – second place	2005 Belgrade	Team
FINA World Cup
Silver medal – second place	2014 Almaty	Team
- Updated on 2 August 2023

Norbert Hosnyánszky (born 4 March 1984) is a retired Hungarian water polo player. He competed at the 2008, 2012, and 2016 Olympics and won a gold medal in 2008.

== Personal life ==
Hosnyánszky was married to Jazmin and has a son Zalan (2013) and a daughter Szonja (2017). They announced their separation in 2026. In 2008, he received the Officer's Cross of the Order of Merit of the Republic of Hungary. In 2015, he had a neck injury in a car accident.

== Honours ==
=== National ===
- Olympic Games: Gold medal - 2008
- World Championships: Gold medal - 2013
- European Championship: Silver medal - 2006, 2014; Bronze medal - 2008, 2012, 2016
- FINA World League: Silver medal - 2005, 2013, 2014
- FINA World Cup: Silver medal - 2014
- Junior World Championships: (Silver medal - 2003)
- Junior European Championship: (Silver medal - 2002)
- Youth European Championship: (Gold medal - 2001)

=== Club ===
- Hungarian Championship (OB I): 5x (2000 – with FTC; 2007, 2009, 2010 – with Vasas; 2011 – with Eger)
- Hungarian Cup (Magyar Kupa): 2x (2009 – with Vasas; 2015 – with Eger)

== Awards ==
- Szalay Iván-díj (2002)
- Best junior player of year: (2003)
- Member of the Hungarian team of year: 2008, 2013
- Ministerial Certificate of Merit (2012)

Orders

- Officer's Cross of the Order of Merit of the Republic of Hungary (2008)

== See also ==
- Hungary men's Olympic water polo team records and statistics
- List of Olympic champions in men's water polo
- List of Olympic medalists in water polo (men)
- List of world champions in men's water polo
- List of World Aquatics Championships medalists in water polo
