= Neptunes WPSC =

Maltese water polo and swimming club

- Founded: 1929; 97 years ago
- League: Premier Division
- Based in: St. Julian's, Malta
- Head coach: Alexander Ciric
- Captain: Steve Camilleri
- Championships: 27 Summer League; 23 Summer Knock-Out; 10 Winter League; 11 President's Cup
- Website: neptuneswpsc.com

Neptunes WPSC is a water polo and swimming club based at Balluta Bay in St. Julian's, Malta. Founded in 1929, the club plays in the Premier Division of the Aquatic Sports Association of Malta and its teams are known as the Reds.

The water polo team has won 27 Premier Division Summer League titles, most recently in 2021, together with 23 knock-out titles, 10 Winter League titles and 11 President's Cups. Six of the club's players were in Malta's squad for the water polo tournament at the 1936 Summer Olympics. The swimming team won its 12th national long-course championship in 2026.

== History ==
Alfred Gauci formed the club in 1929 from swimmers who trained at Balluta Bay and named it after Neptune, the Roman god of the sea. Neptunes won their first league championship in 1933, beating Sliema in a decider that began a lasting rivalry between the two clubs, and added league titles in 1934, 1937 and 1938. Six of the club's players – Frank Wismayer, Jimmy Chetcuti, Joe Albanese, Alfred Lanzon, and the brothers Wilfred and Babsie Podestà – were in the Maltese squad for the water polo tournament at the 1936 Summer Olympics in Berlin.

Neptunes won the first post-war championship in 1945 and a league and knock-out double in 1949. The team then declined through the 1950s and did not win the league again until 1964.

The 2006 championship was the club's first since 1993; Neptunes retained the title in 2007 for an 18th championship. The club won nine more league titles between 2010 and 2021; the 2021 championship, a 10–6 win over San Ġiljan in the deciding match, was its 27th. In June 2026 Neptunes beat San Ġiljan to win the President's Cup for an 11th time. Neptunes, nicknamed the Reds, then opened the 2026 Premier Division campaign with a 15–7 win over Exiles.

== Swimming ==
The club also competes in national swimming competitions. In 2026 its swimming team won the national long-course championship for the 12th time.

== Water polo honours ==
Water polo honours won by Neptunes WPSC
Competition	Titles	Seasons
Summer League Premier Division	27	1933, 1934, 1937, 1938, 1945, 1949, 1964, 1969, 1972, 1977, 1984, 1986, 1987, 1988, 1989, 1993, 2006, 2007, 2010, 2011, 2012, 2013, 2014, 2016, 2018, 2019, 2021
Summer KO Premier Division	23	1934, 1947, 1949, 1964, 1967, 1969, 1970, 1972, 1975, 1978, 1980, 1981, 1983, 1987, 1988, 1990, 1994, 2003, 2005, 2011, 2012, 2014, 2019
Winter League Premier Division	10	1994, 2000, 2002, 2003, 2004, 2006, 2008, 2013, 2015, 2019
President's Cup	11	1999, 2004, 2006, 2007, 2009, 2011, 2013, 2014, 2019, 2025, 2026
Enemed Water Polo Cup	1	2021
Għaqda Ġurnalisti Sport Cup	6	1998, 2000, 2001, 2002, 2003, 2005
