= Ta' Xbiex W.C. =

Waterpolo Club from Malta

Ta' Xbiex
- Based in: Ta' Xbiex
- Arena: Ta' Xbiex
- Colors
- Website: https://taxbiexwaterpoloclub.com/

Ta' Xbiex Waterpolo Club is a waterpolo club from Ta' Xbiex, Malta.

For sponsorship reasons, the club is known as Ta' Xbiex Amigos.

== Current squad ==
As at June 12, 2018:

- (Malta) Miguel Vassallo
- (Italy) Raoul Greco
- (Malta) Malcolm Manara
- (Malta) Luke Hyzler
- (Malta) Benji Cachia
- (Malta) Kurt Mock
- (Malta) Gareth Blundell
- (Serbia) Nikola Dedović
- (Malta) Liam Galea
- (Malta) Keith Tanti
- (Malta) Niall Saliba
- (Malta) Liam Pace
