= Malta Sailing Federation =

Maltese government organization

Malta Sailing Federation MSF
- IOC nation: Malta (MLT)
- Sport: Sailing

HISTORY
- Year of formation: 1975
- Former names: Malta Yachting Federation

DEMOGRAPHICS
- Number of Sailing clubs: -
- Number of affiliated Sailing clubs: 9

AFFILIATIONS
- International federation: International Sailing Federation (ISAF)
- Continental association: EUROSAF
- National Olympic Committee: Maltese Olympic Committee

ELECTED
- President: Michael Mifsud

SECRETARIAT
- Secretary General: Chris Bajada

FINANCE
- Company status: Association

The Malta Sailing Federation is the national governing body for the sport of sailing in Malta, recognised by the International Sailing Federation.

== History ==
In 1975 the Royal Malta Yacht Club instigated the formation of the Malta Yachting Federation with a view to such body assuming the recognition, at the time accorded to the club by the Malta Government (National Sports Board), as the National Authority and controlling body for yachting in Malta.

== Famous sailors ==
See Category:Maltese sailors

=== Olympic sailing ===
See Category:Olympic sailors of Malta
