= Marsaxlokk A.S.C. =

Marsaxlokk
- Based in: Marsaxlokk
- Arena: Marsaxlokk
- Colors
- President: Victor Fenech
- Website: http://www.marsaxlokk-asc.com/

Marsaxlokk Aquatic Sports Club is a waterpolo team from Marsaxlokk which competes in Malta.

For sponsorship reasons, the team is known as Marsaxlokk Browns.

The club also has a Swimming division and operates a restaurant.

== Current squad ==
As at June 12, 2018:

- (Malta) Ryan Coleiro
- (Malta) C. Spiteri Debarro
- (Malta) Luke Calleja
- (Malta) Clyde Bonello
- (Malta) Christian Gialanze
- (Malta) Rainier Scerri
- (Malta) Michael Rizzo
- (Malta) Brian Buhagiar
- (Italy) Stefano Luongo
- (Italy) Matteo Cacici
- (Malta) Joseph Galea
- (Malta) Norbert Hosnyánszky
- Head Coach: (Slovakia) : Roman Polačík
