= Marsaskala S.C. =

Marsaskala SC
- Founded: 1927; 99 years ago
- Based in: Marsaskala
- Arena: Marsaskala
- Colors
- Website: https://marsaskalasportsclub.com/

Marsaskala Sports Club is a waterpolo club from Marsaskala, Malta. The club was founded in 1927.

For sponsorship reasons, the club is currently known as Marsaskala Fish and Fish.

== History ==
Up until 1972, there was a Marsascala Aquatic Sports Club which however was "dissolved due to internal conflicts".

== Current squad ==
As at June 15, 2021:

- (Malta) Jurgen Micallef
- (Malta) Jean Claude Cutajar
- (Malta) Kyle Navarro
- (Malta) Jake Ciantar
- (Malta) Gian Luca Galea
- (Malta) Paul privitera
- (Malta) Ayrton Camenzuli
- (Malta) Mark Carani
- (Malta) Malcolm Manara
- (Malta) Raoul Greco
- (Malta) Aidan Muscat
- (Malta) Dalton Camilleri
- (Malta) Gerald Sammut
- (Malta) Luca Felice
- (Malta) Stephen Micallef
- Head Coach: (Hungary) Arpad Babay
