= Birzebbuga A.S.C. =

Birżebbuġa
- Founded: 1955; 71 years ago
- Based in: Birżebbuġa
- Arena: Pretty Bay, Birżebbuġa
- Colors: White, Blue, and Red
- President: James Bonnici Mcintyre
- Head coach: Pierre Borg
- Championships: -
- Website: http://www.birzebbugaasc.com/

Birzebbuga Aquatic Sports Club is a waterpolo club from Birżebbuġa, Malta.

For sponsorship reasons, the club is known as Birżebbuġa Freeport.

== History ==
The club was founded in 1955. Many of the first players of the club were British servicemen. Popularity of the club and the game increased year by year, but the club did not have enough funds, and times it was difficult to honour fixtures, either due to lack of players, or lack of a venue. Sometimes the club had to play its home fixtures away from home, in neighbouring Marsaxlokk.

The club's organigram was fluid in the beginning, and in order to acquire a waterpolo pitch, there need an organised set up which could take on legal responsibilities. Thus the waterpolo clan was absorbed by the Birżebbuġa St. Peter's F.C. in 1965 and played under the name of St. Peter's. This lasted until 1967.

The club once again encountered difficulties and was last seen in the national championships in 2002, this time due to structural works to deepen the seabed level in the centre of Pretty Bay for the enlargement of the Malta Freeport, which made the club's premises unusable, due to the seabed level rising around the pitch and blocking the seawater circulation tunnels in the pitch. Up until 2007, the club was still being claimed to have been left in dire state, both in terms of organisation as well as in terms of premises.

In 2007, the committee announced that a project would soon be launched. This was met by some contention, especially from the environmentalist Green Party Democratic Alternative (Malta).

In 2013, then Leader of the Opposition, Joseph Muscat promised a refurbished water polo pitch to the locals, as part of his electoral campaign for the Maltese general election, 2013. Eventually, funds were given by the Government of Malta for the refurbishment of the club's premises, with a plan to re-enter the team in the Maltese Waterpolo leagues. The Marine Section within the Marine, Storm Water and Valley Management Unit in the Ministry of Transport of Infrastructure, were assigned the project. In 2015, the works were described to be "on track". According to Infrastructure Minister Joe Mizzi, this was part of Birżebbuġa's regeneration plan. This was part of 3 projects costing €3 million in 3 years.

The new pitch was inaugurated in 2017 by Joseph Muscat, then Prime Minister of Malta, a project which cost around €2.5 million. The final phase of the project is the embellishment through art installations atop the premises.

In 2017, a sponsorship agreement with Malta Freeport was signed for two years.

Birzebbuga returned again in 2017, and were back with a bang by winning their first knockout match against Otters A.S.C.

== Current squad ==
Season 2024:

- (Malta) Matthew Sladden
- (Malta) Simeon Bezzina
- (Malta) Neil Cassar
- (Malta) Julian Cauchi
- (Malta) Isaac Galea
- (Malta) Malcolm Manara
- (Malta) Daniel Incorvaja
- (Malta) Jake Abdilla
- (Malta) Dwayne Farrugia
- (Malta) Mikhael Cutajar
- (Malta) Marco Mannino
- (Malta) Miguel Curmi
- (Malta) Sven Livori
- (Malta) Miguel Cassar
- Head Coach: (Malta) Pierre Borg
