= Otters A.S.C. =

Maltese water polo club

Otters ASC
- Sport: Waterpolo
- Founded: 1971; 55 years ago
- League: BOV National Water Polo Competition - First Division
- Based in: Żebbuġ, Gozo
- Arena: Otters, Marsalforn, Żebbuġ, Gozo
- Colors
- President: Dr. Enzo Dimech
- Head coach: Mr. Mijat Mijatovic
- Website: http://www.ottersasc.org/

Otters Aquatic Sports Club is a waterpolo club from Żebbuġ, Gozo, Malta. Otters represents Gozo in the Maltese Waterpolo league system.

For sponsorship reasons, the club is currently known as Otters Nivea.

== History ==
The club website states that it is unclear when the club first started, however, the first players were registered with the Gozo Aquatic Association on July 28, 1971, and thus this is considered the founding date. The first players included Anton Refalo, Victor Grech, George Calleja, Carmel Debattista and Frank Masini. Otters have humble beginnings in the Gozitan Waterpolo League, starting from its second division. Eventually, all the other teams (Għajnsielem, Sea Urchins, Blue Sharks, Dolphins, Whales, Penguins) became defunct and Otters ASC joined the national league system.

Otters ASC first fielded an Under-18 team within the Maltese Aquatic Sports Association of Malta in 1977 as an experiment. Eventually, in 1980, Otters started to test the Maltese waters again, and by 1982, they grew too strong within Gozo; thus, the club decided to join the Maltese league system for good.

== Premises ==
The clubhouse is located in Marsalforn and overlooks the bay. Its restaurant is open all year round. During the summer months, the water polo pitch is set up and used for water polo and swimming training. The premises also have showers and changing rooms.

== Current squad ==
- (Malta) (Gozo) Matthew Xerri (C)
- (Malta) (Gozo) Andrew Dimech
- (Malta) (Gozo) Steve Dimech
- (Malta) (Gozo) Kenneth Micallef
- (Malta) (Gozo) Karl Scicluna
- (Malta) (Gozo) Luigi Dimech
- (Malta) (Gozo) Matthias Bonnici
- (Malta) (Gozo) David Dimech
- (Malta) (Gozo) Mark Meli
- (Malta) (Gozo) Mattia Grech
- Head Coach: (Serbia) Mijat Mijatovic
- Team Physio: (Gozo) Daniel Azzopardi
- Fitness Trainer: (Gozo) John Henry Meilak
