= Ta' Xbiex =

- Local council
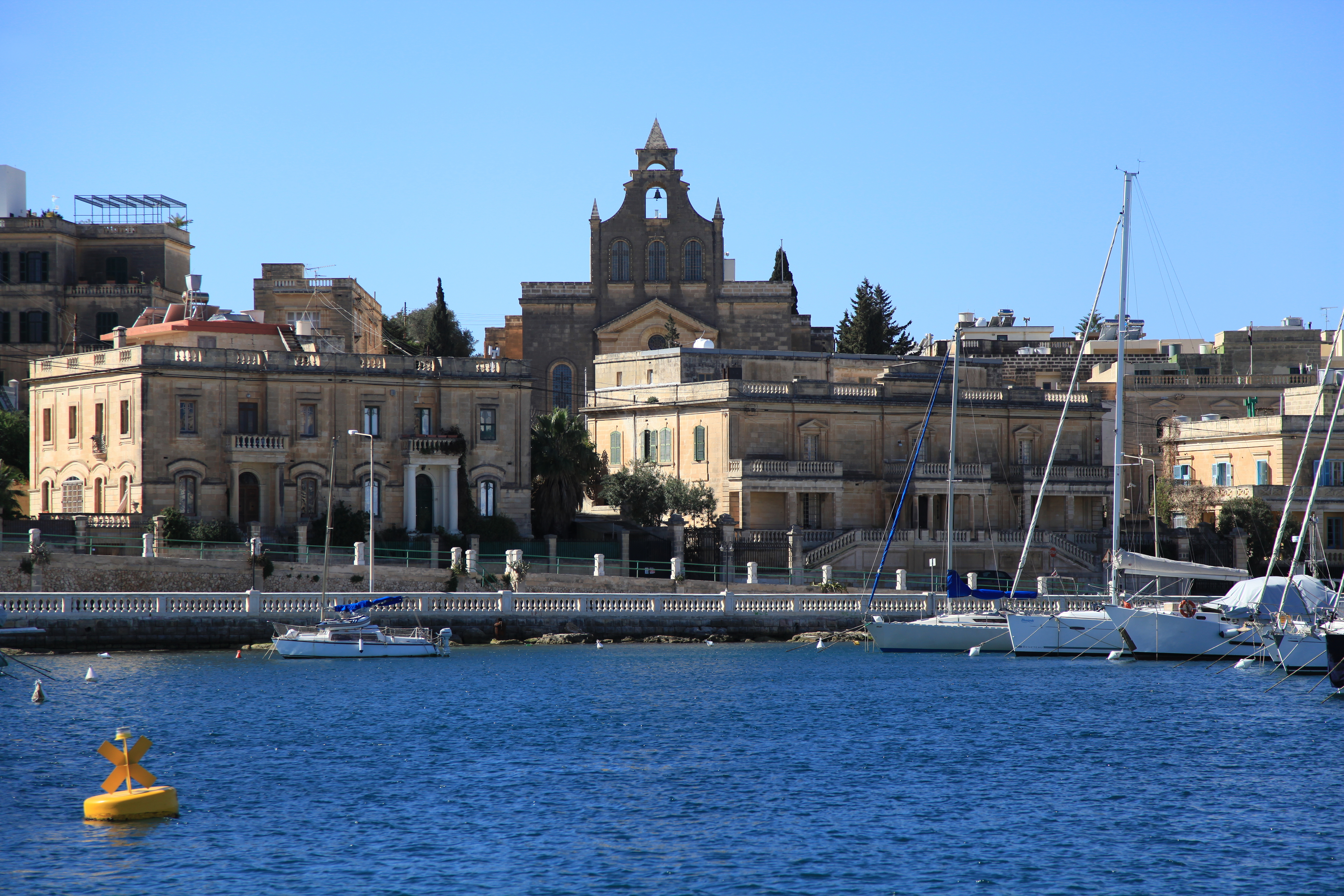
- Ta' Xbiex seafront and parish church

- Flag Coat of arms
- Etymology: "the nets"
- Motto: Unitate Fortior
- Coordinates: 35°53′57″N 14°29′53″E
- Country: Malta
- Region: Eastern Region
- District: Northern Harbour District
- Borders: Gżira, Msida

Government
  - Mayor: Max Zammit (PL)

Area
  - Total: 0.8 km^{2} (0.31 sq mi)

Population (Jul. 2024)
  - Total: 2,646
  - Density: 3,300/km^{2} (8,600/sq mi)
- Demonym: Ta' Ta' Xbiex
- Time zone: UTC+1 (CET)
  - Summer (DST): UTC+2 (CEST)
- Postal code: XBX
- Dialing code: 356
- ISO 3166 code: MT-58
- Patron saint: St. John of the Cross
- Day of festa: Sunday before 25 November
- Website: Official website

Ta' Xbiex (Maltese pronunciation: [tɐʒˈbɪːʃ]) is a locality and Local Council in the Eastern Region of Malta. It is part of a small headland within the Marsamxett Harbour, right between the villages of Msida and Gżira.

The population of Ta' Xbiex was 2,646 in July 2024. This included 1,410 males and 1,236 females; 1,315 Maltese nationals and 1,331 foreign nationals.

== Etymology ==
The name Ta' Xbiex is said to have originated from it exact geographical location as it faces the rising sun. The Maltese word 'Tbexbex' is descriptive of the sun as it rises. Others say the name might originate from word 'Xbiek' meaning fishing nets as would seem appropriate from its inhabitants being able to sail and fish freely from its shores. Indeed, its coat of arms depicts a ship's wheel, further confirming its connection with the sea.

== Important Buildings ==
Many of the beautiful houses in Ta’ Xbiex house a number of foreign embassies. The Whitehall Mansions has a prestigious address, and an example of unique Maltese architecture. The building presently houses, amongst others, embassies of Netherlands, Spain, Germany, Ireland, and the British High Commission. In the 1950s it was known as The Wrennery being the residential quarters of the Woman's Royal Naval Service (WRNS).

There are also a number of service providers such as insurance companies, law firms, auditing and accounting firms.

Among the original villas situated in the streets opposite the sea, one finds Villa Oxania, which belonged to the noted physician and leading archaeologist, Sir Temi Zammit (1864-1935), and Villa Cloe, home to Sir Arturo Mercieca (1878-1969), long-time president of the Maltese Courts and a well known political leader. Both patriots died while they held residence at Ta' Xbiex.

=== St. John of the Cross Church ===
This church became a parish in 1969 and is run by the Carmelite Monks. Decorated in the Basilical and Roman style, it is known for its unique Crucifix which is 420 cm high and 240 cm wide. Put in place in 1971 this large steel Crucifix is based on a drawing by St. John of the Cross and may be the largest reproduction of its kind and the only silhouette cross in the world.

== Yachting ==
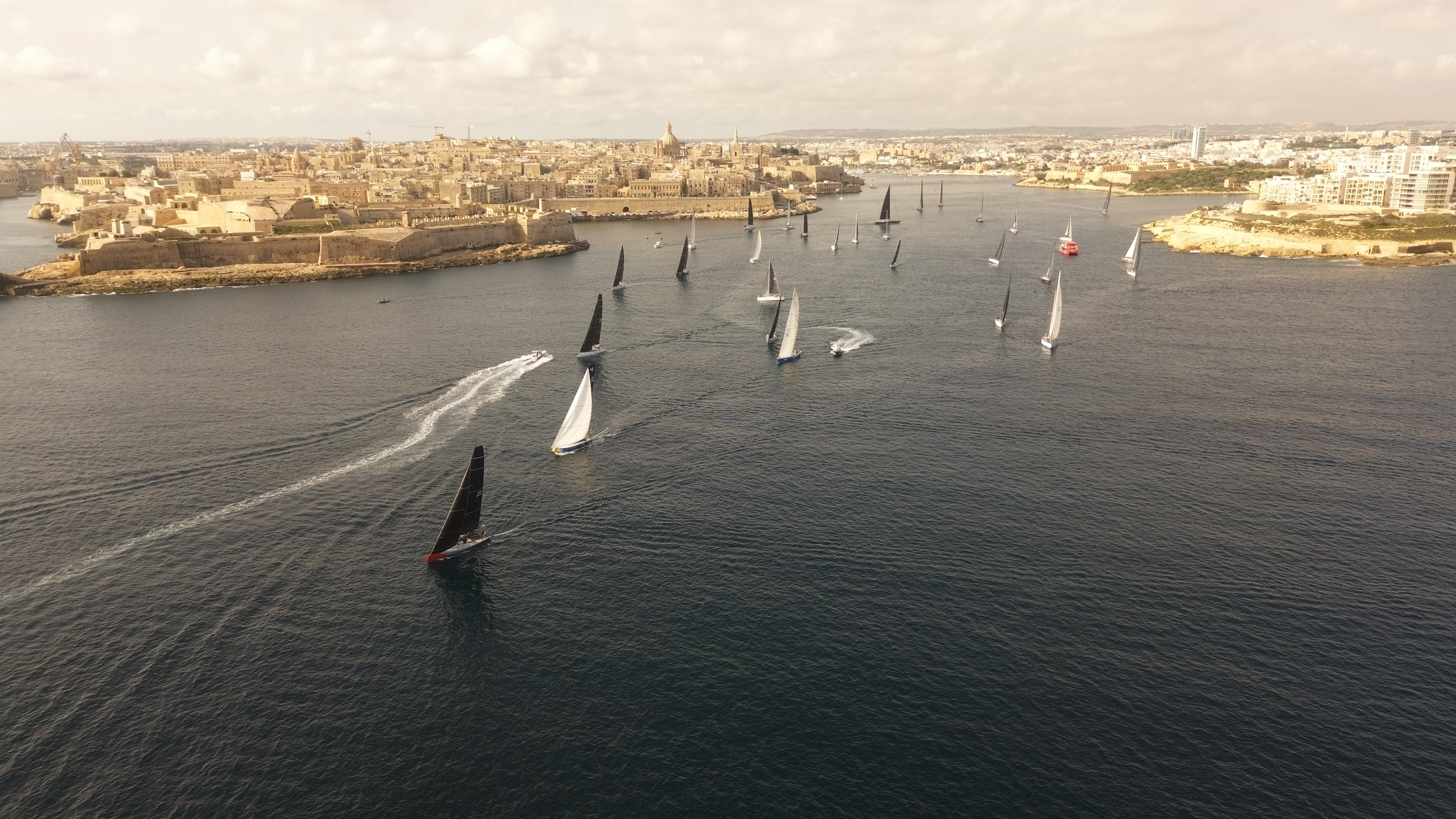
Yachts heading out to sea.

For many years in the 1950s various battleships were berthed in the Msida/Ta' Xbiex creek. From the 1960s right up until today, Ta' Xbiex hosts many private boats with people from all nationalities making this location their berthing home for short as well as long stays.

The Royal Malta Yacht Club, sits on the Ta' Xbiex seafront and plays host to the Rolex Middle Sea Race. Tracing its origins back to the 1800s, this yachting club now enjoys well equipped premises and facilities on a site it renovated in 2008. It also houses a 65 berth Yacht Marina in the same location.

Ta' Xbiex is also home to a 720 berth Msida and Ta' Xbiex Yacht Marina. Due to its stratic location, the marina is sought after for its central location and the shelter afforded from the prevailing North-Westerly winds, while the breakwater protects against a North-Easterly swell.

Several marine services providers are also found in the area. There are a number of restaurants along the coast that take advantage of the location, catering for the yachting community whilst also offering spectacular harbour views of the Bastions in Valletta and Floriana.

== Sport ==
Ta' Xbiex forms part of a sea-side promenada that runs from Pietà all the way to St Julian's. It is a very popular route for runners who enjoy a backdrop of historical bastions, seaviews as well as busy city bustle as they move into Gzira, Sliema and St Julians.

== Local Council ==
The Ta' Xbiex Local Council is formed by the following:

Mayor: Max Zammit

Deputy Mayor: Oriana Calleja

Councillors: Louise Cachia Castelletti

Eugenio Muscat

Rosario Portelli

Executive Secretary: Yasmine Tonna

== Main roads ==
- Triq Giuseppe Calì (Giuseppe Calì Street)
- Triq Abate Rigord (Abate Rigord Street)
- Triq Enrico Mizzi (Enrico Mizzi Street)
- Triq il-Prinċipessa Margerita (Princess Margaret Street)
- Triq il-Prinċipessa Eliżabetta (Princess Elizabeth Street)
- Triq l-Ambaxxati (Embassy Road)
- Triq Sir Augustus Bartolo (Sir Augustus Bartolo Street)
- Triq San Ġwann tas-Salib (St. John of the Cross Street)
- Triq Sir Ugo Mifsud (Sir Ugo Mifsud Street)
- Triq L-Imradd
- Triq Testaferrata (Testaferrata Street)
- Ir-Rampa Ta' Xbiex (Ta' Xbiex Terrace)
- Vjal Sir Temi Zammit (Sir Temi Zammit Avenue)
- Ix-Xatt Ta' Xbiex (Ta' Xbiex Coast Road)
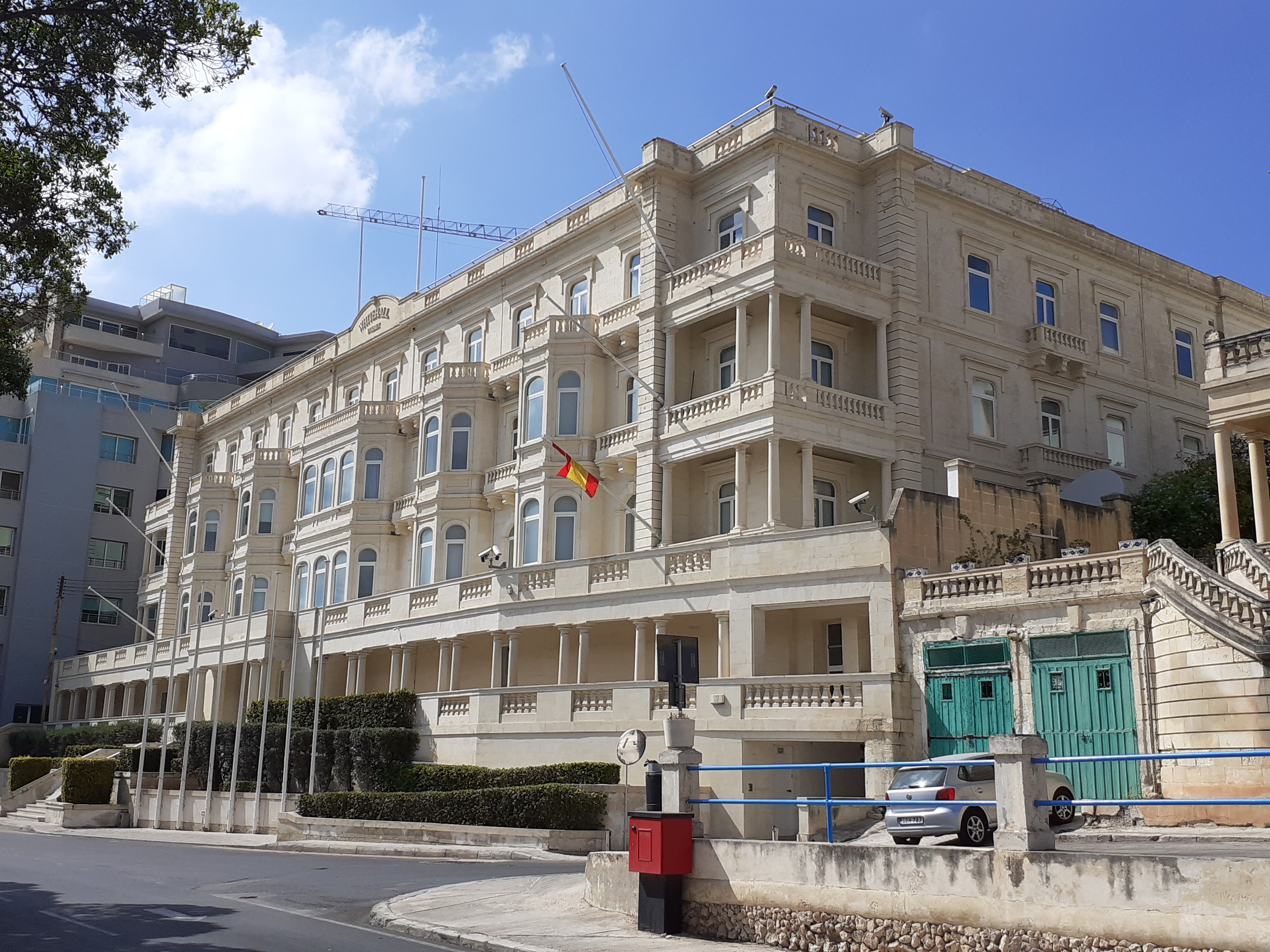
No. 2, Whitehall mansion (seat of the German, Dutch, Irish, Spanish and UK Embassies to Malta)

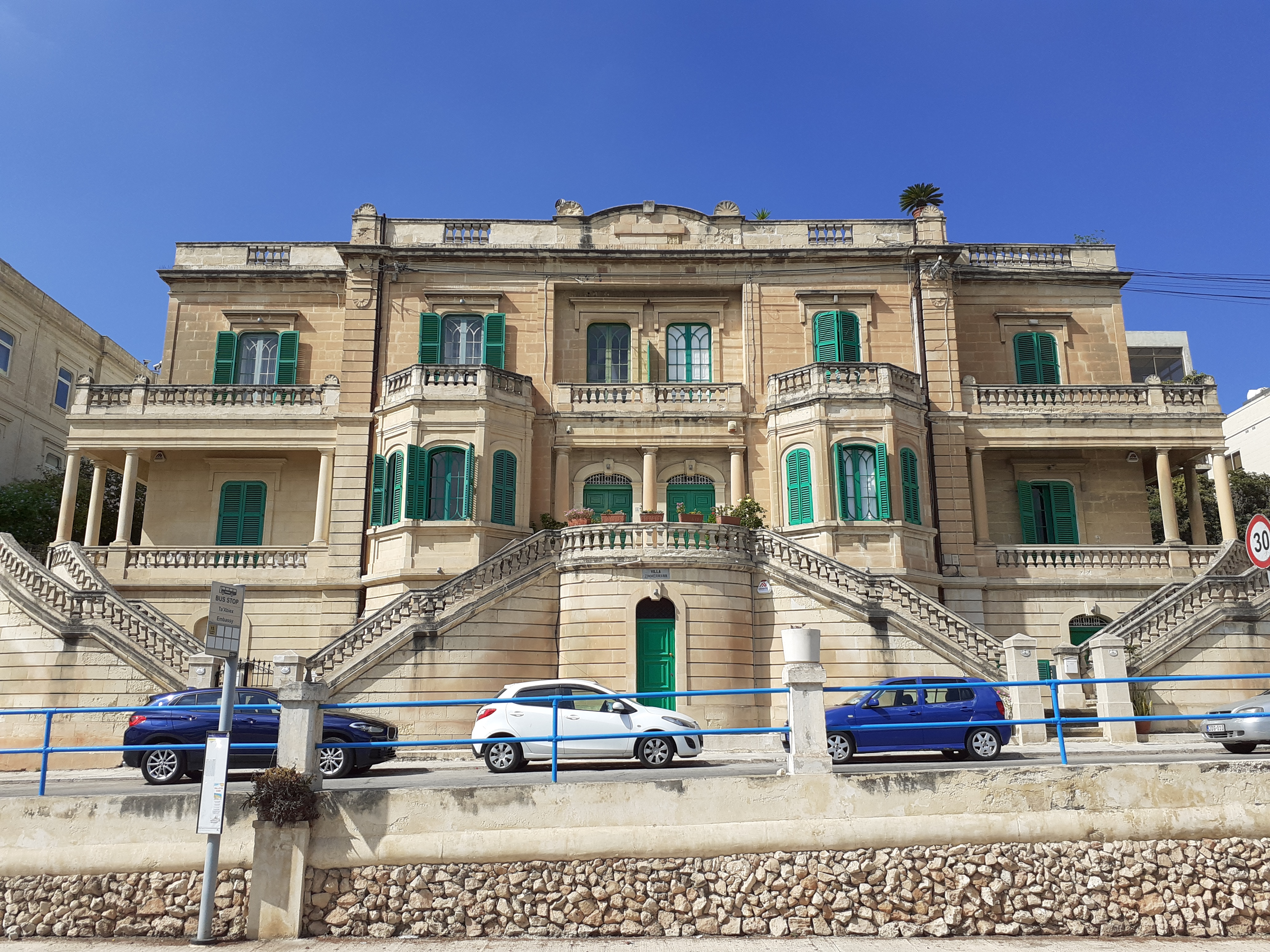
No. 4, Villa Zimmerman, Greek Embassy

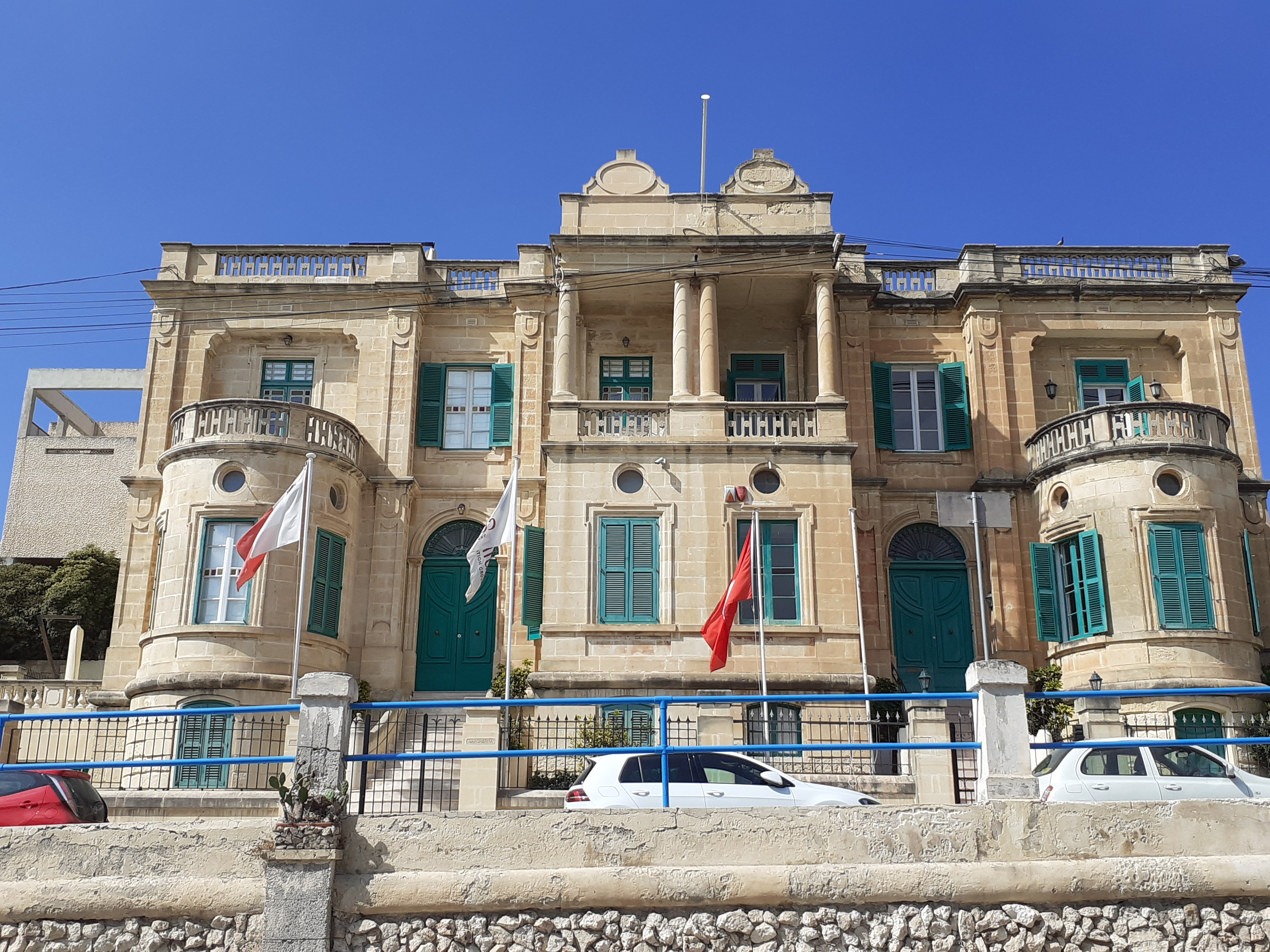
No. 4

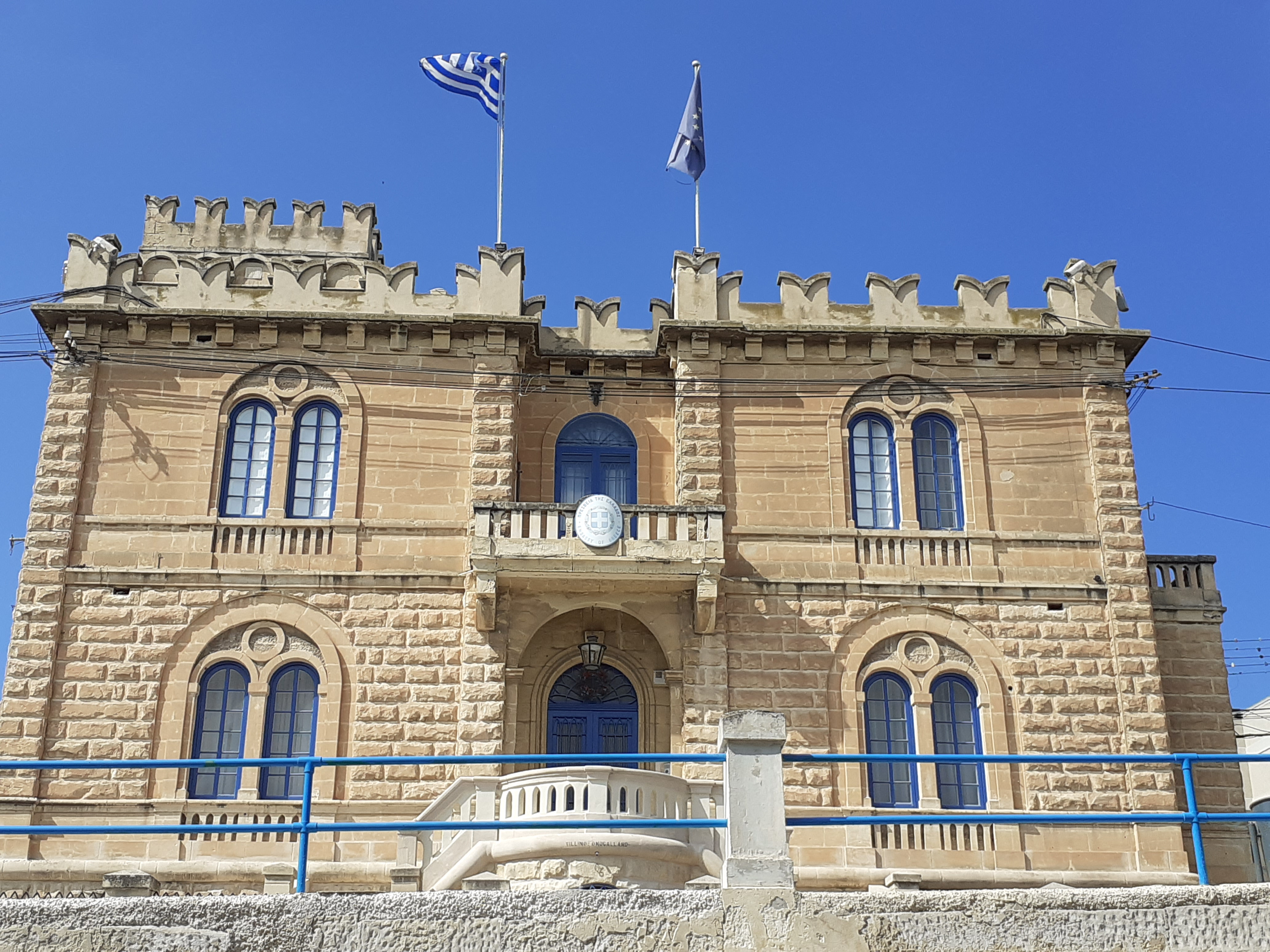
No. 6

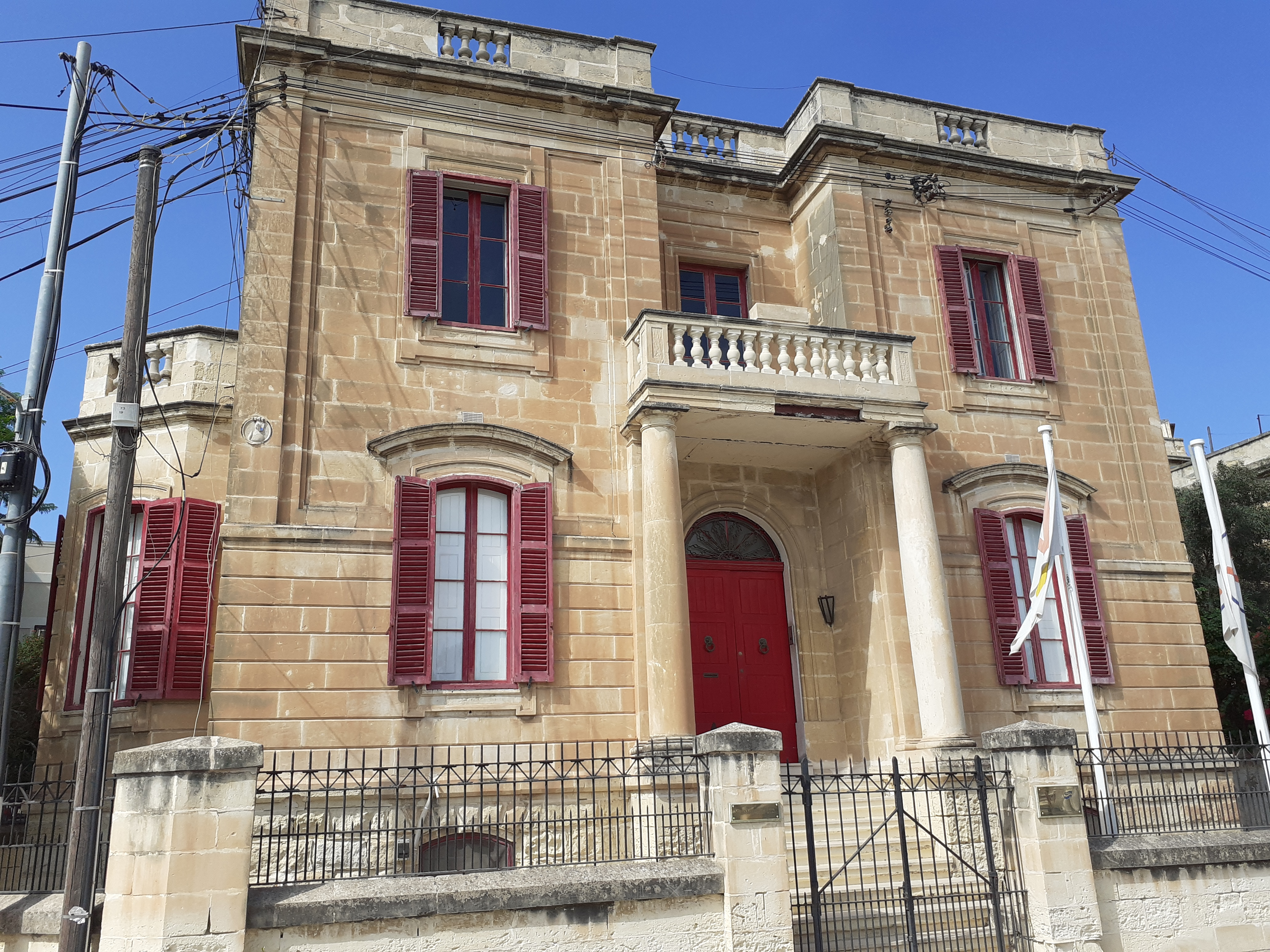
No. 8

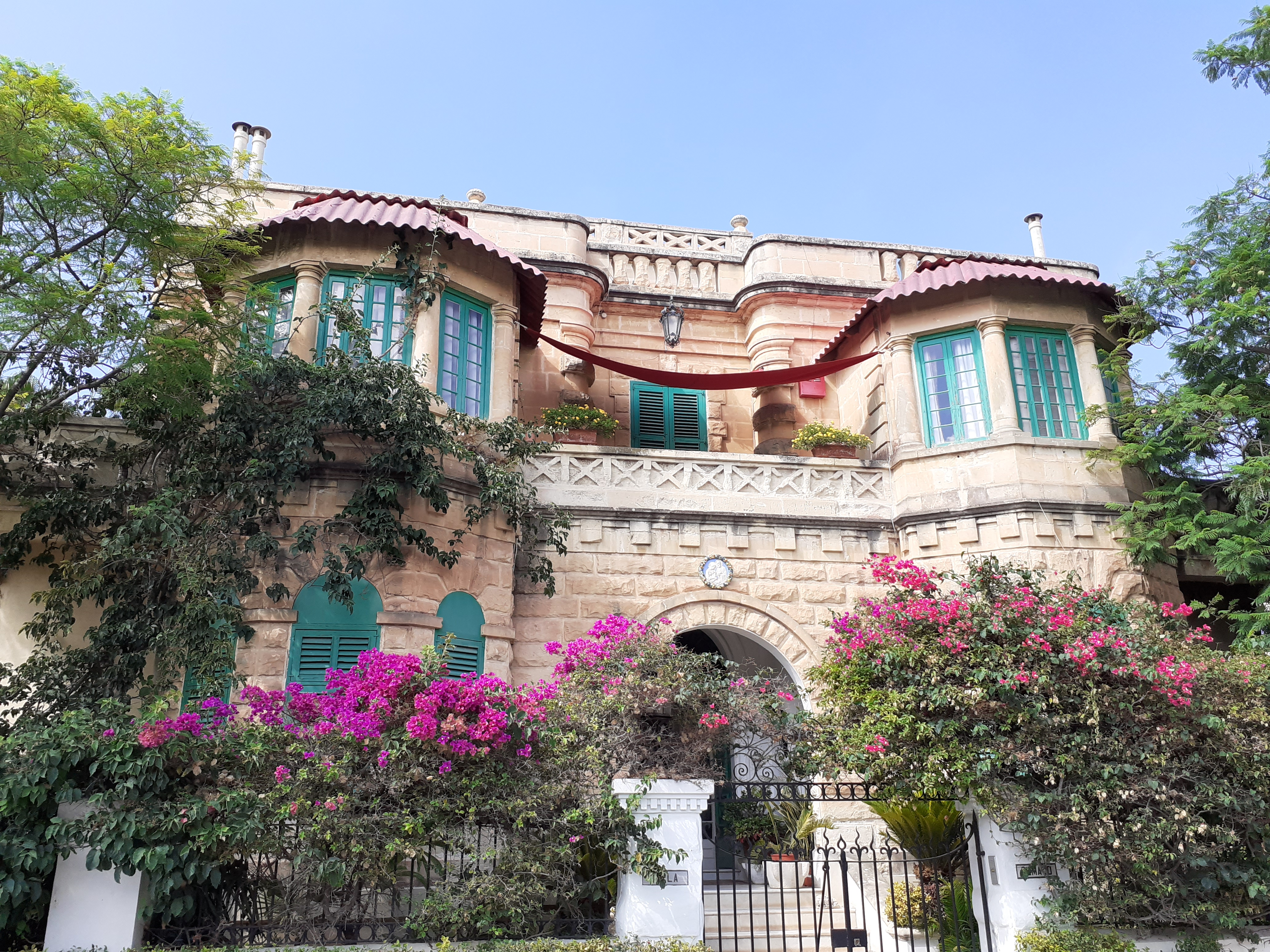
No. 10

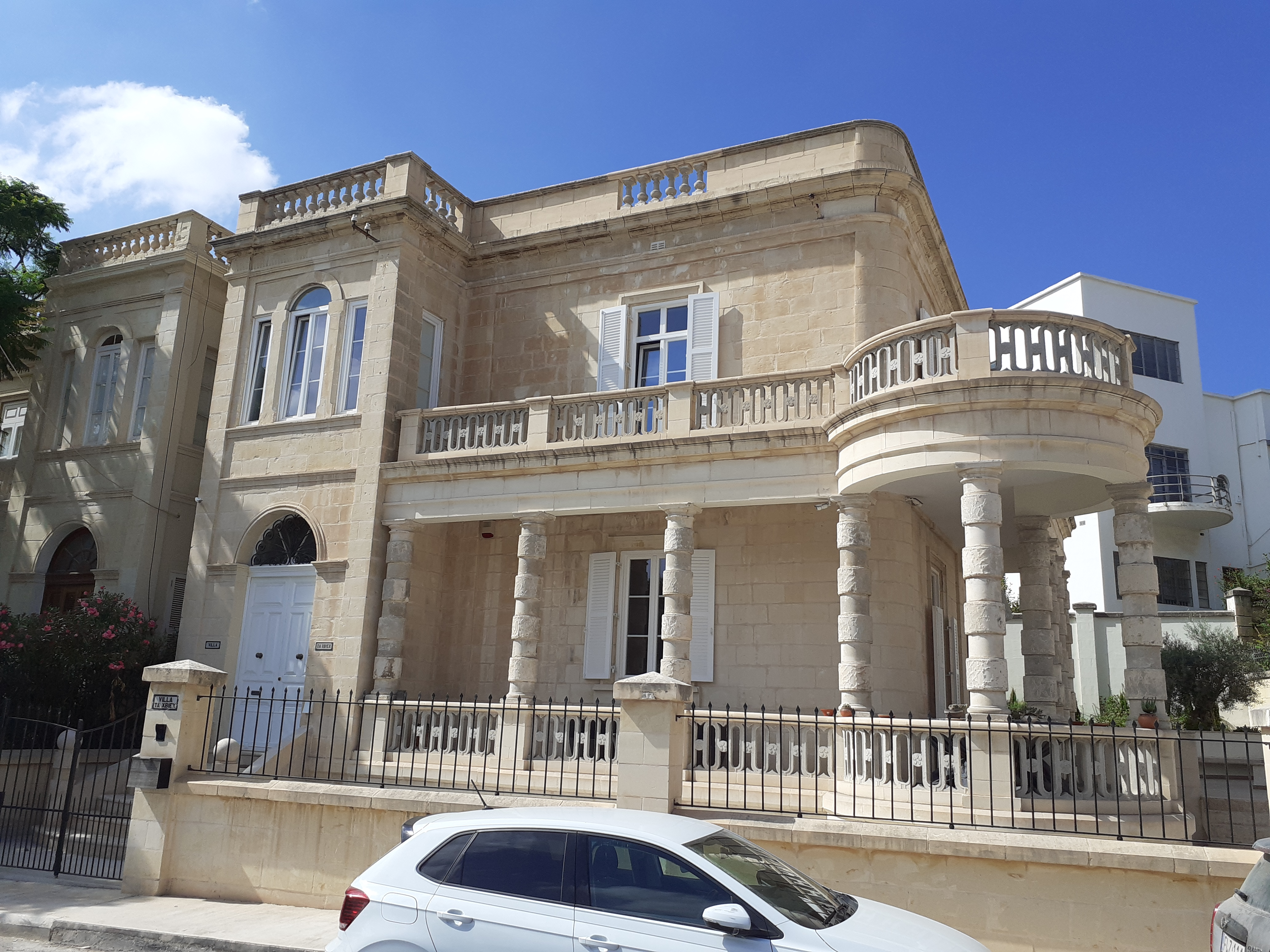
No. 12

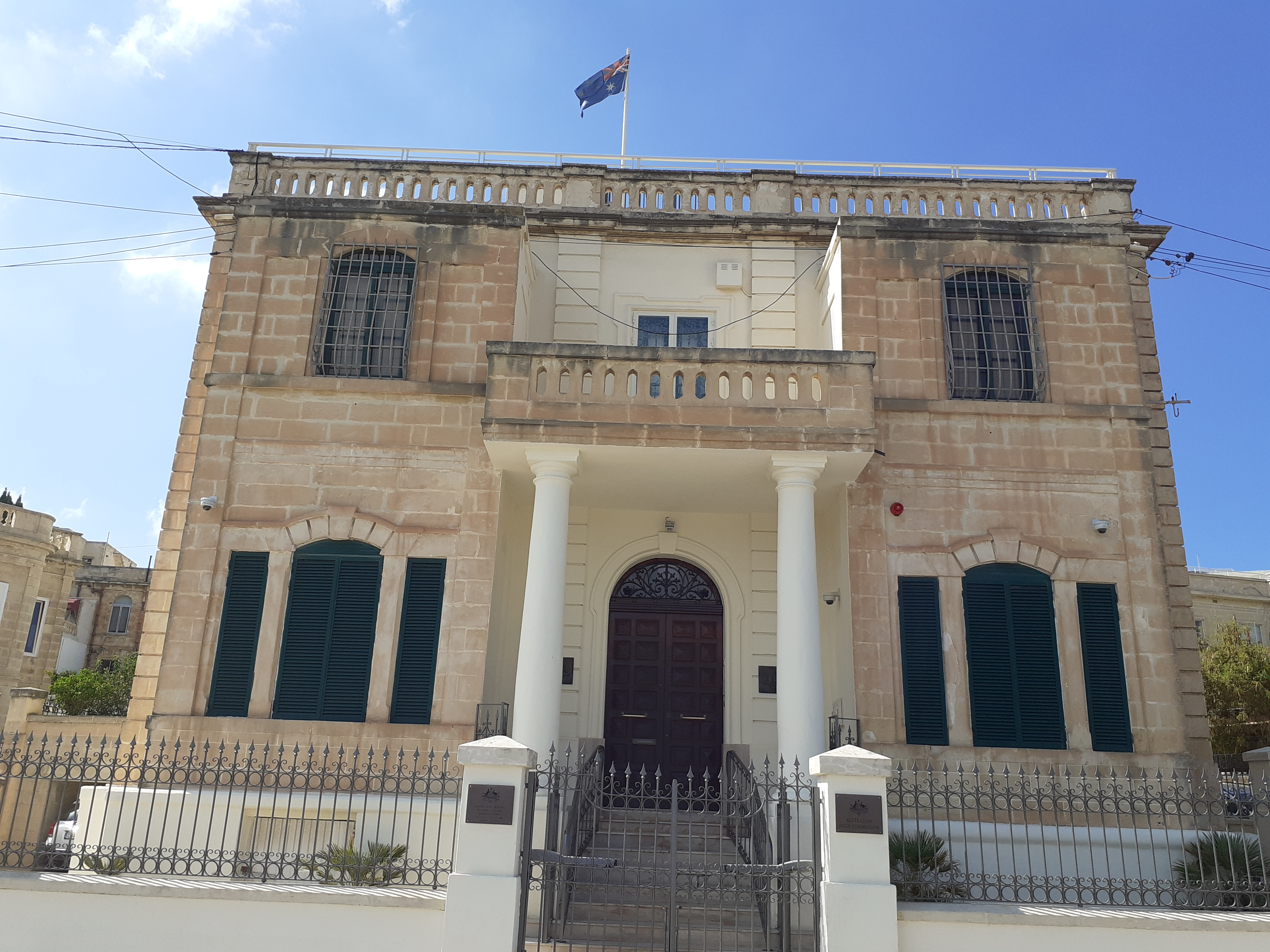
No. 14, Australian High Commission

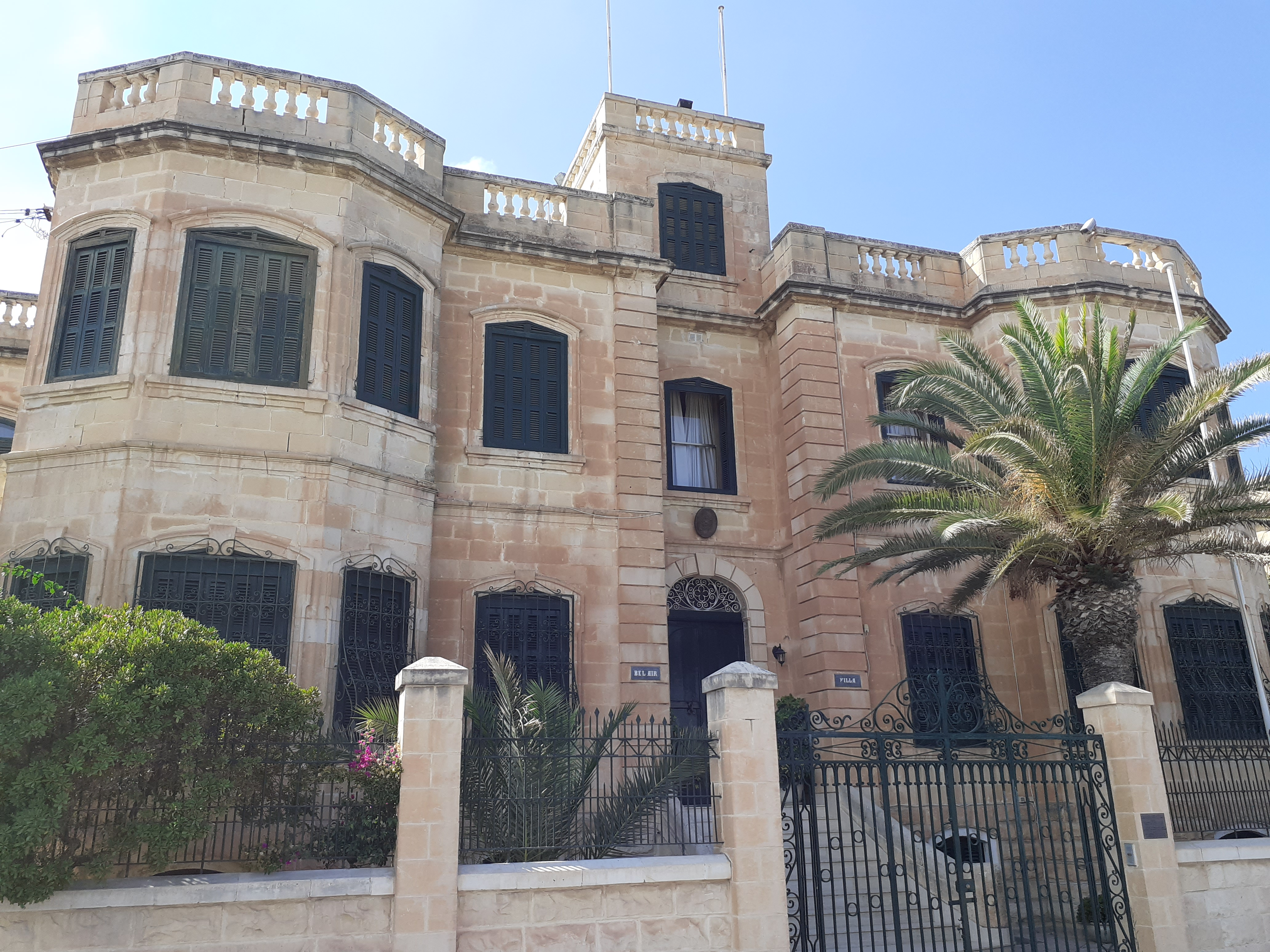
No. 16, Villa Bel Air, Italian Ambassador's Residence

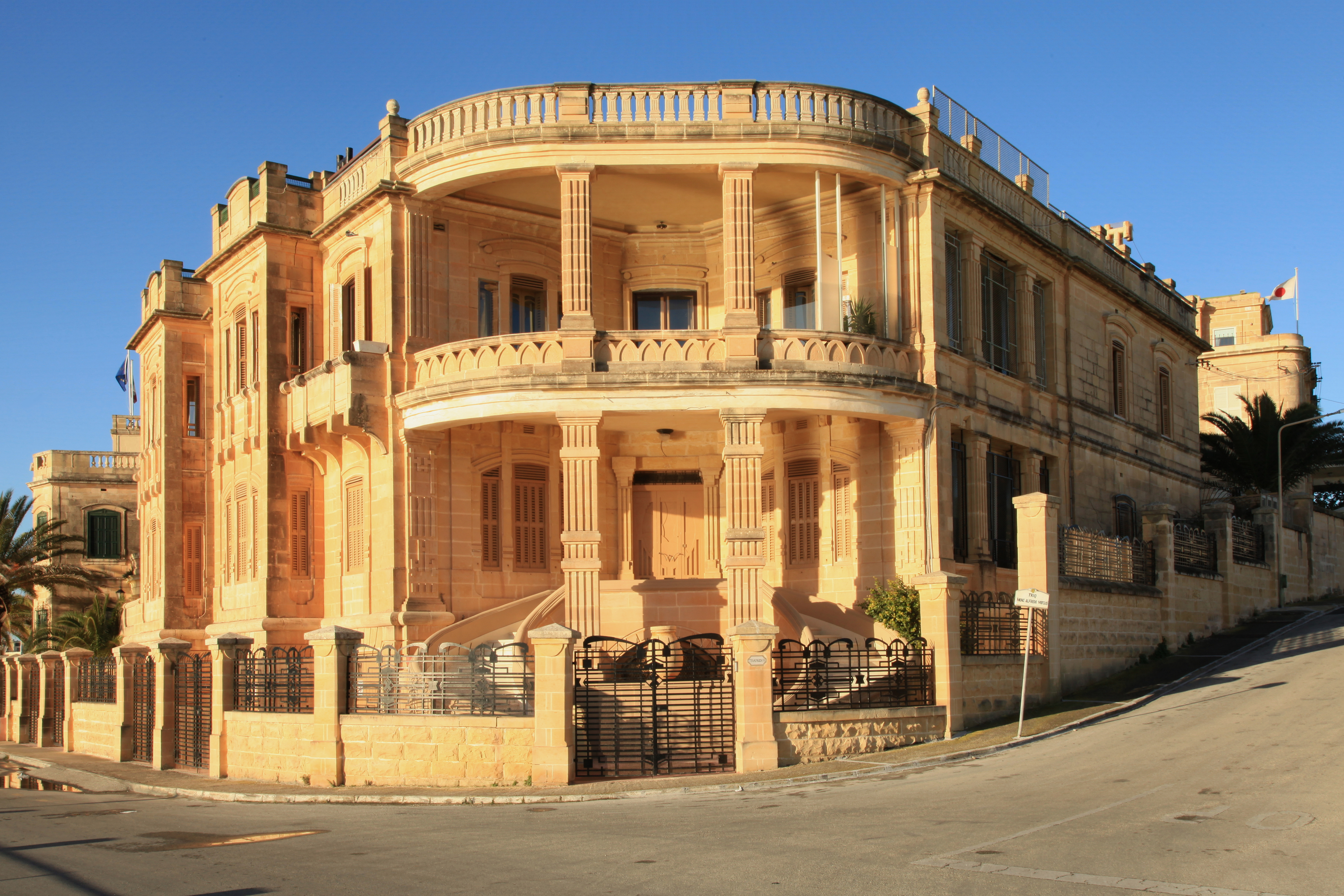
No. 18, Villa Trafalgar

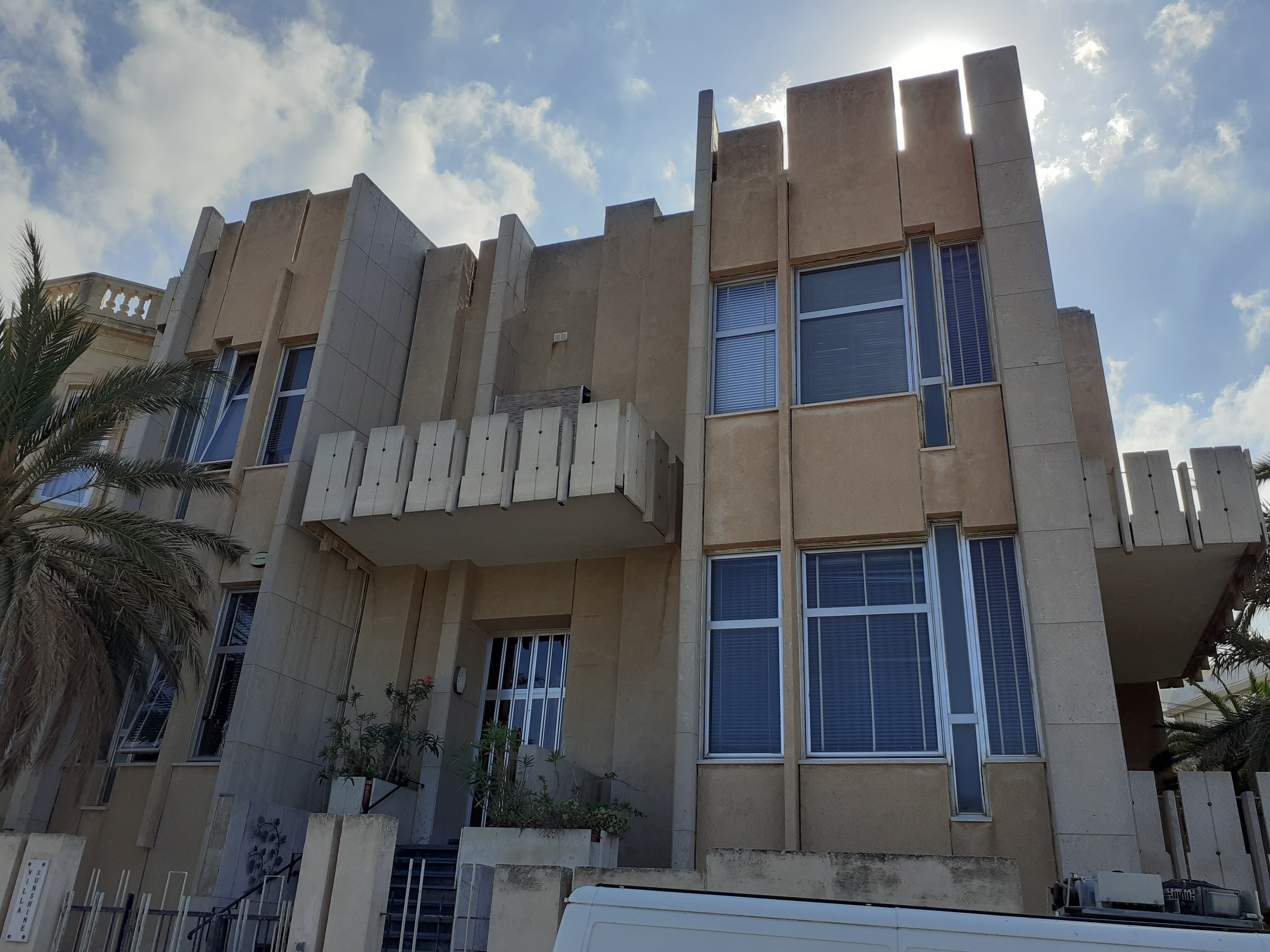
No. 22, Villa Sunshine, by arch. Mario Meneghello (1962–64)

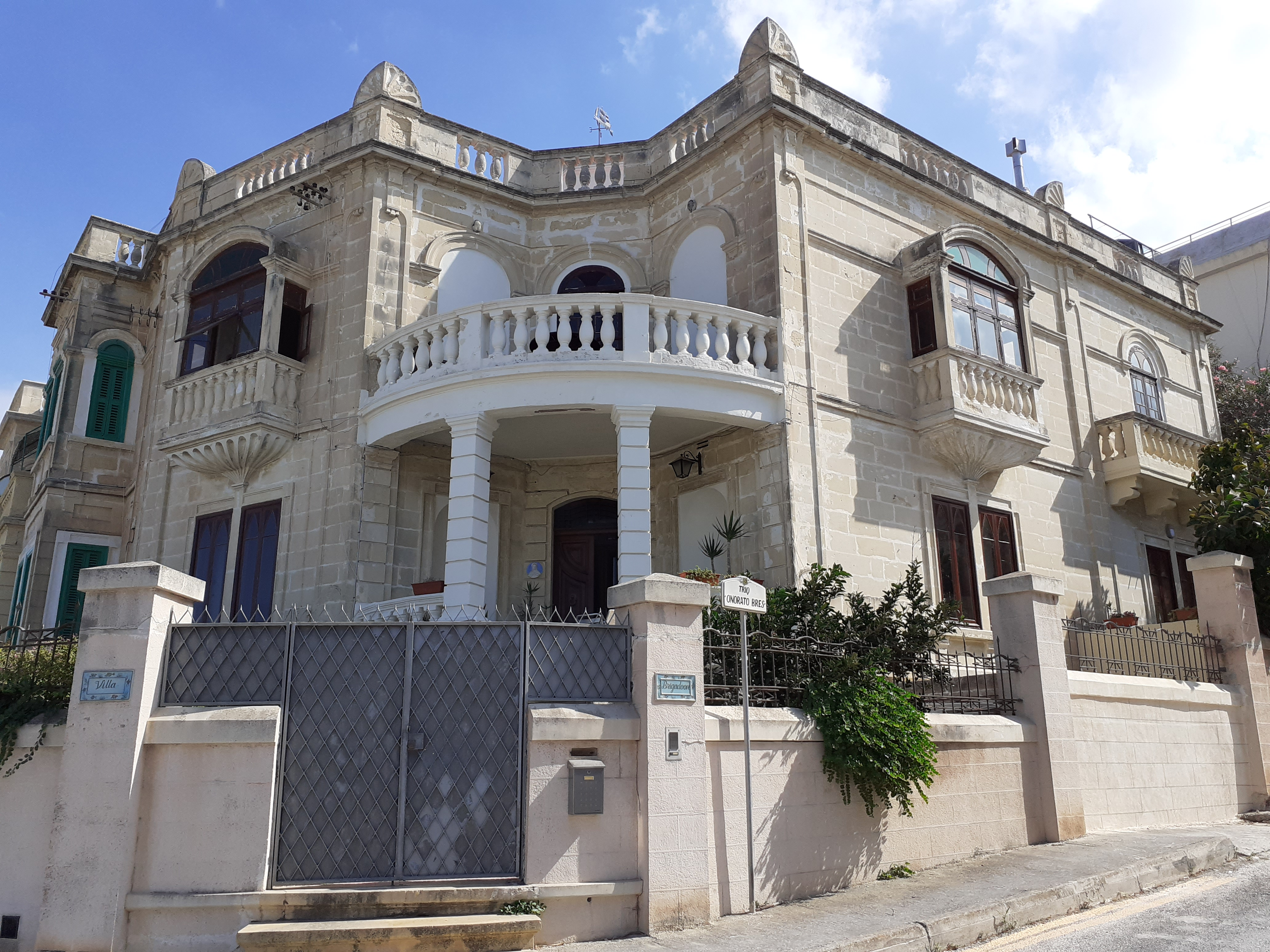
No. 30

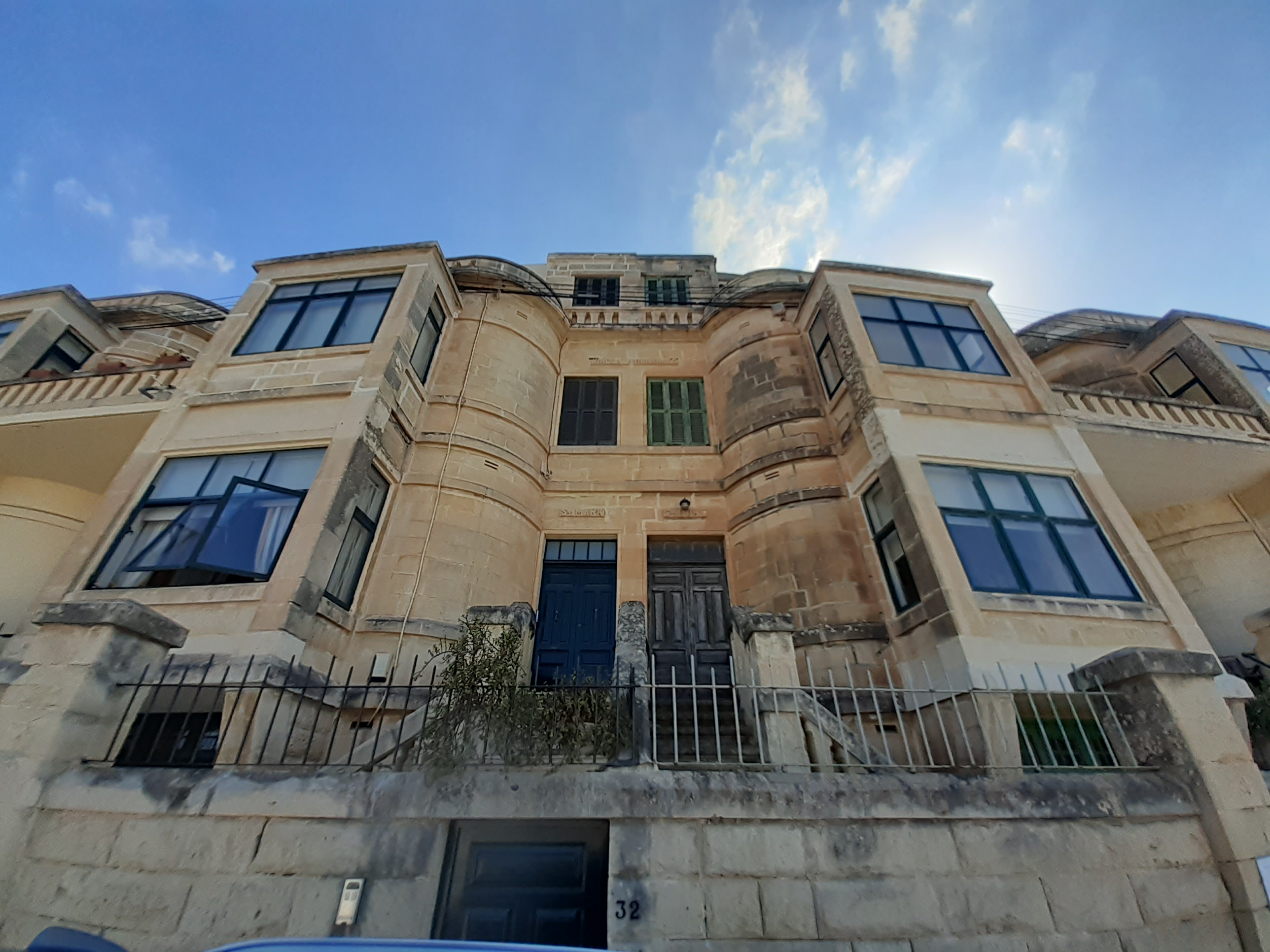
No. 31-32, Vincenti Buildings by Gustavo R. Vincenti

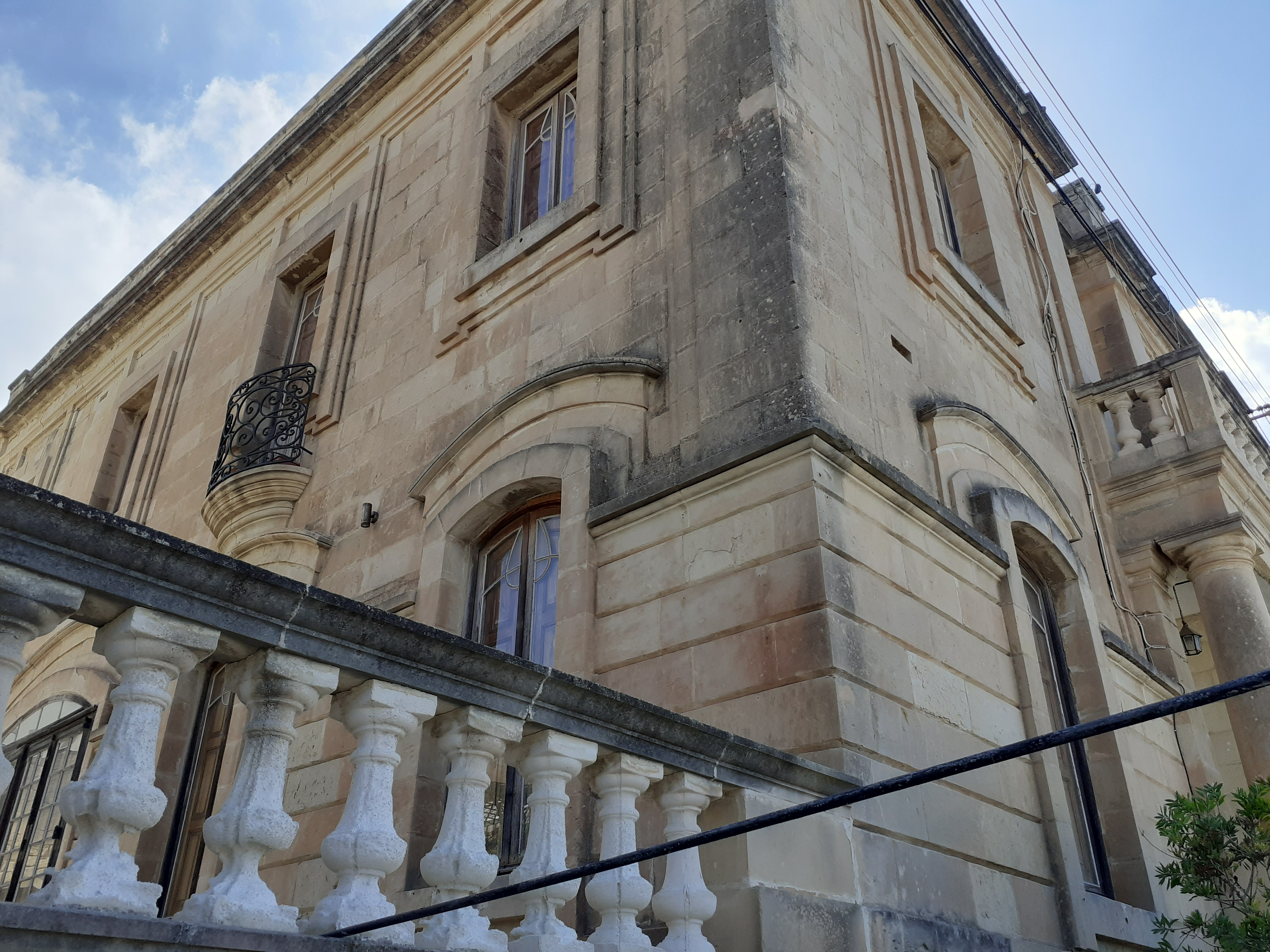
No. 34 (Art Deco details)

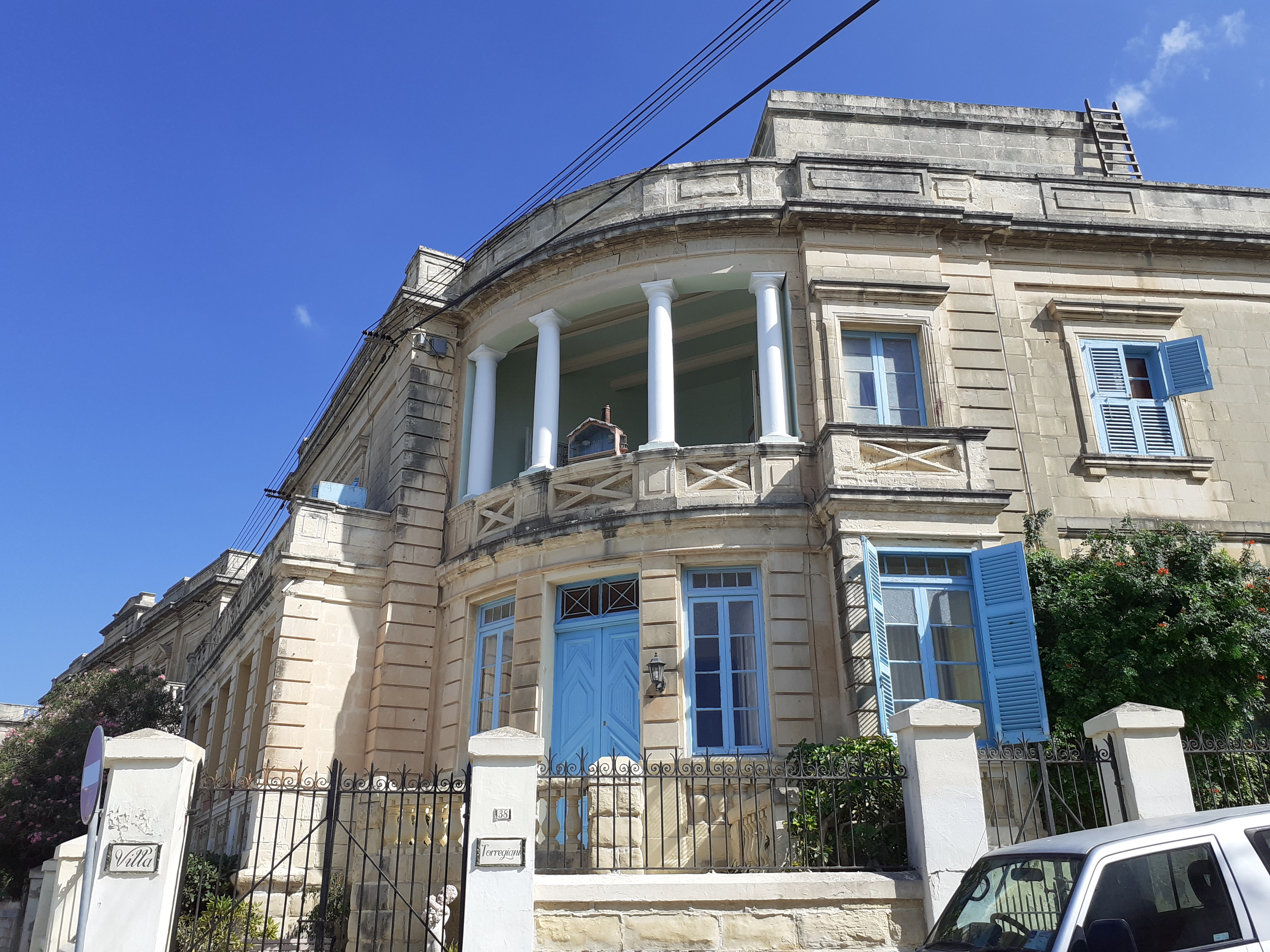
No. 38, Villa Torregiani

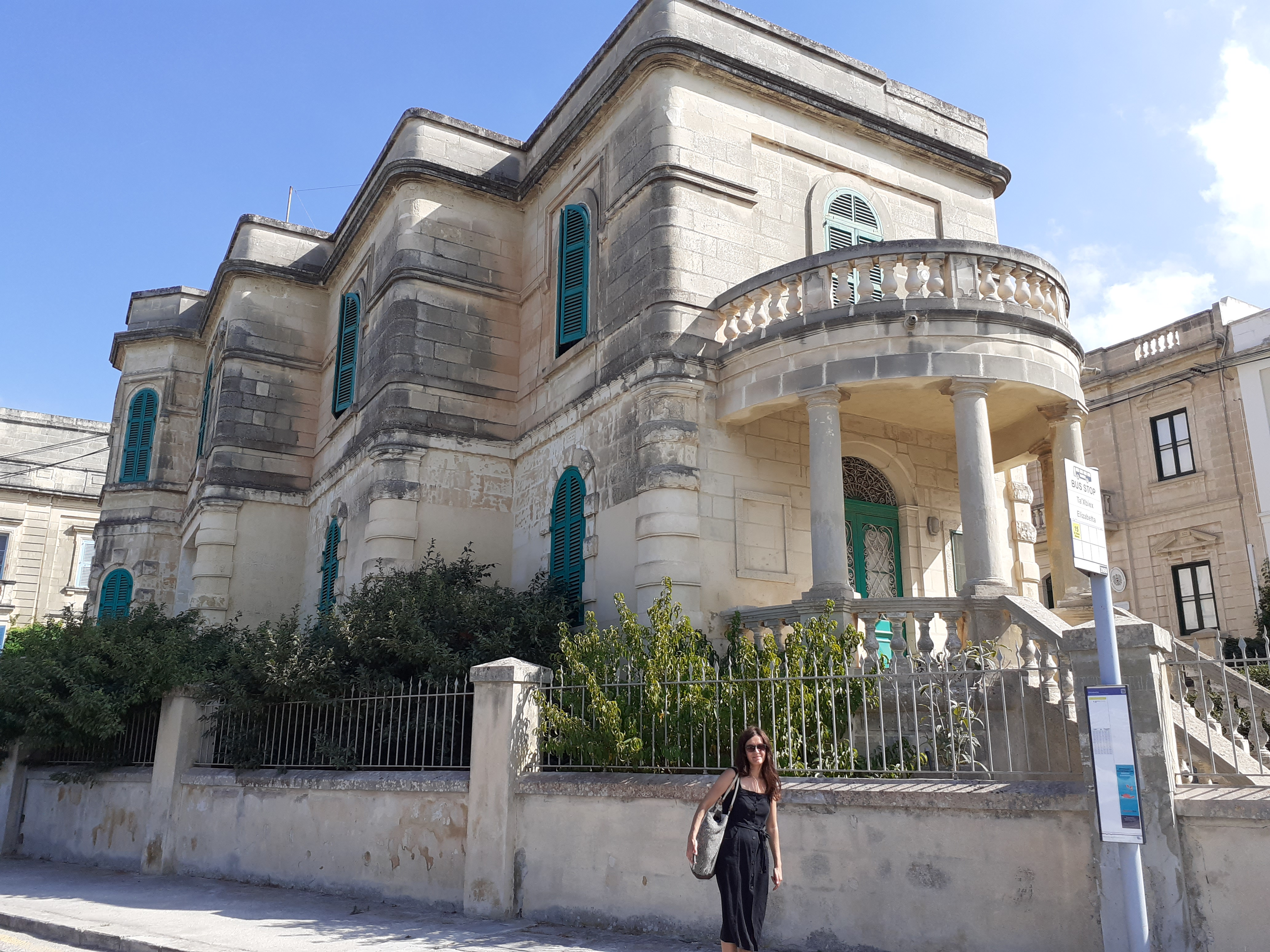
No. 40

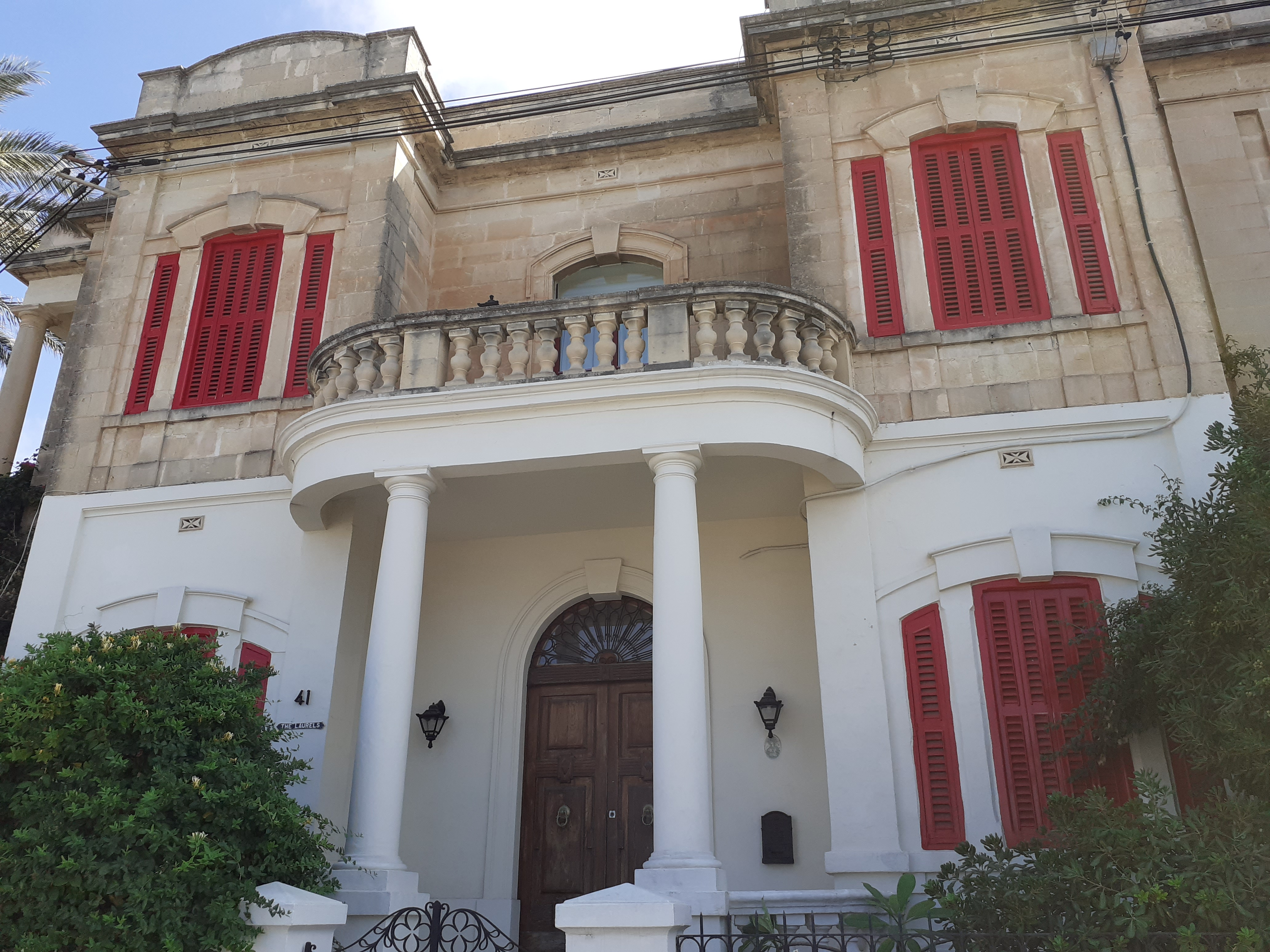
No. 42

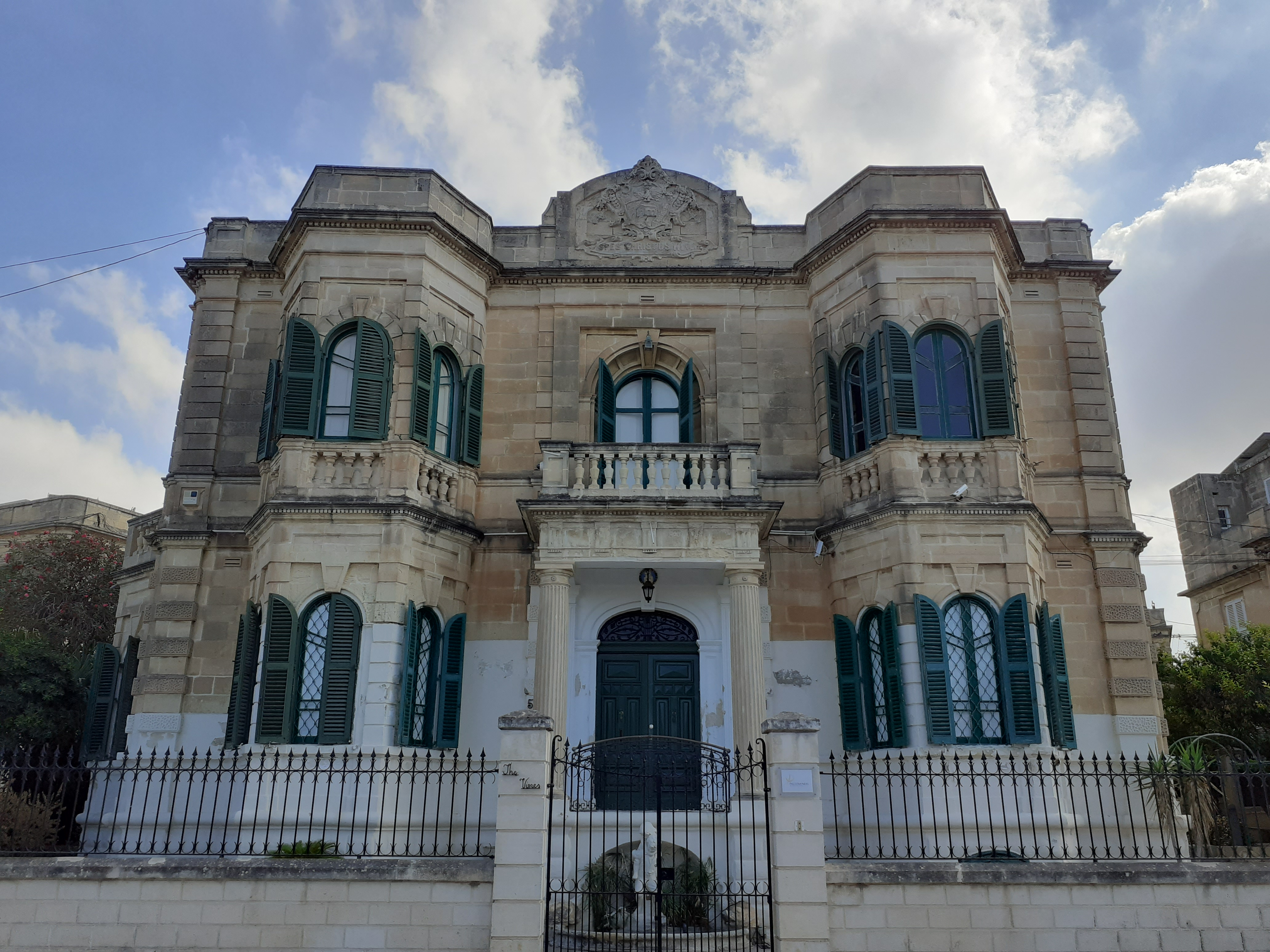
No. 51, Villa The Vines

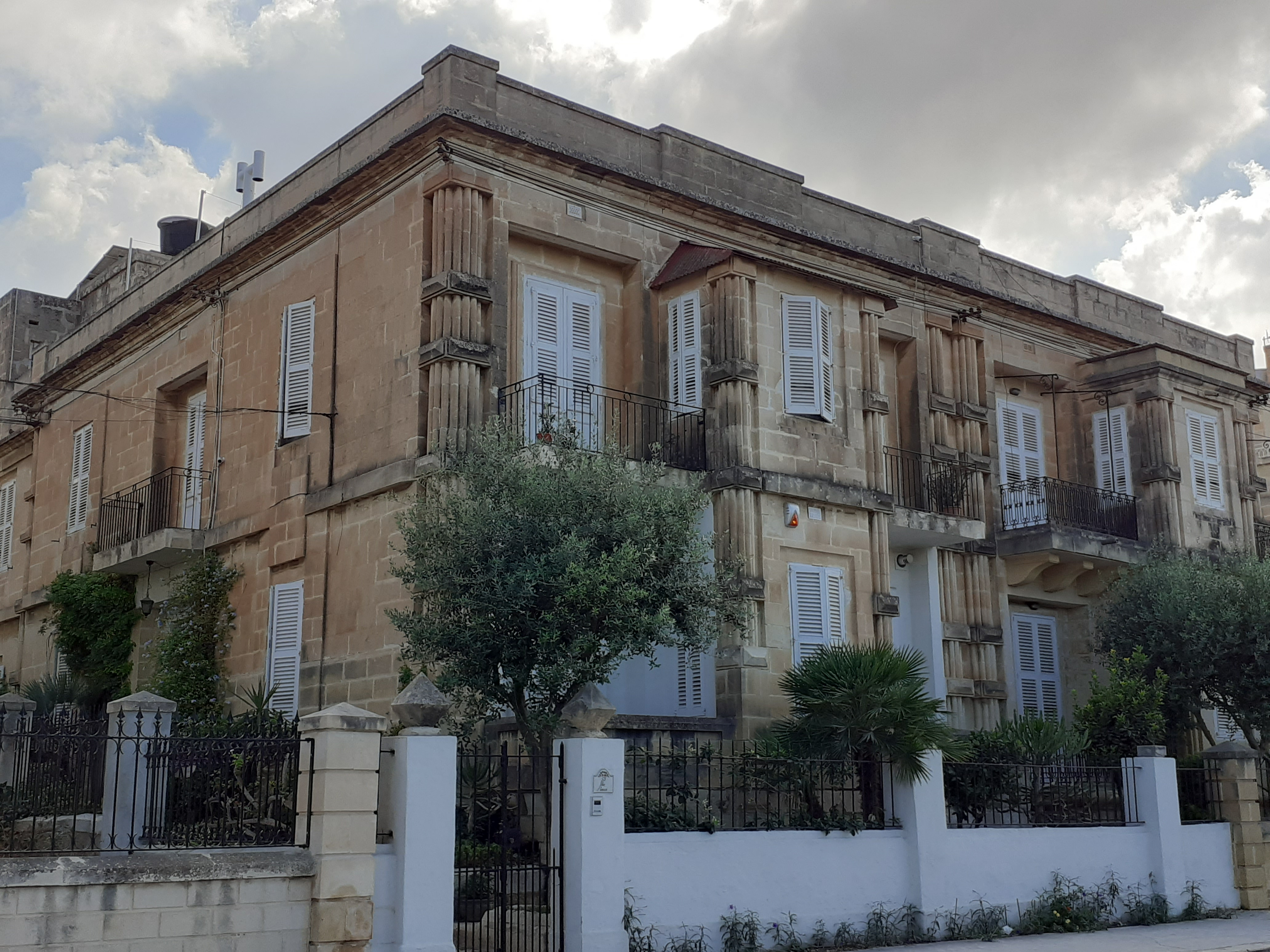
No. 54, Villa Gloria by Alberto La Ferla in Stile Littorio

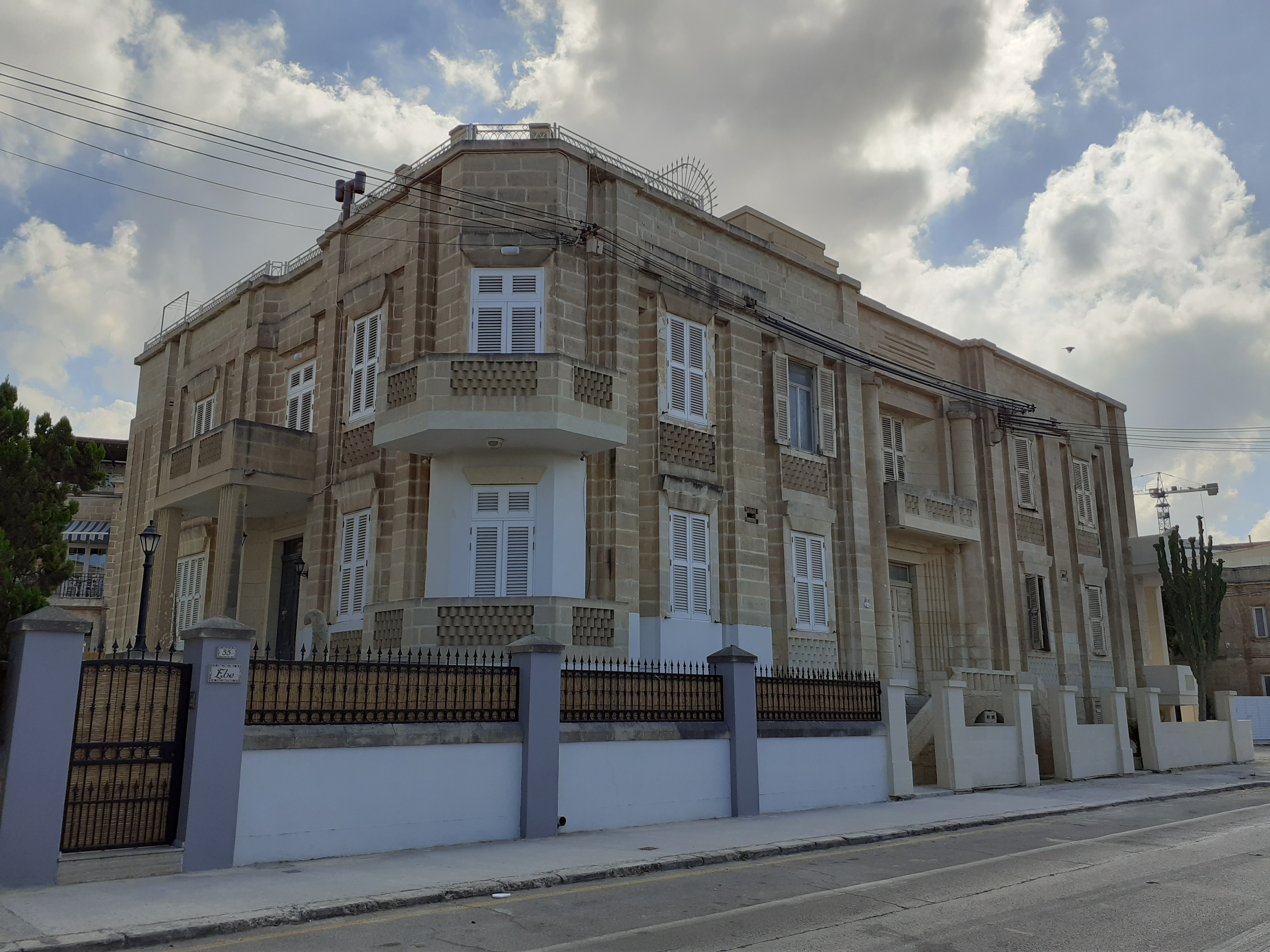
No. 55, Villa Ebe

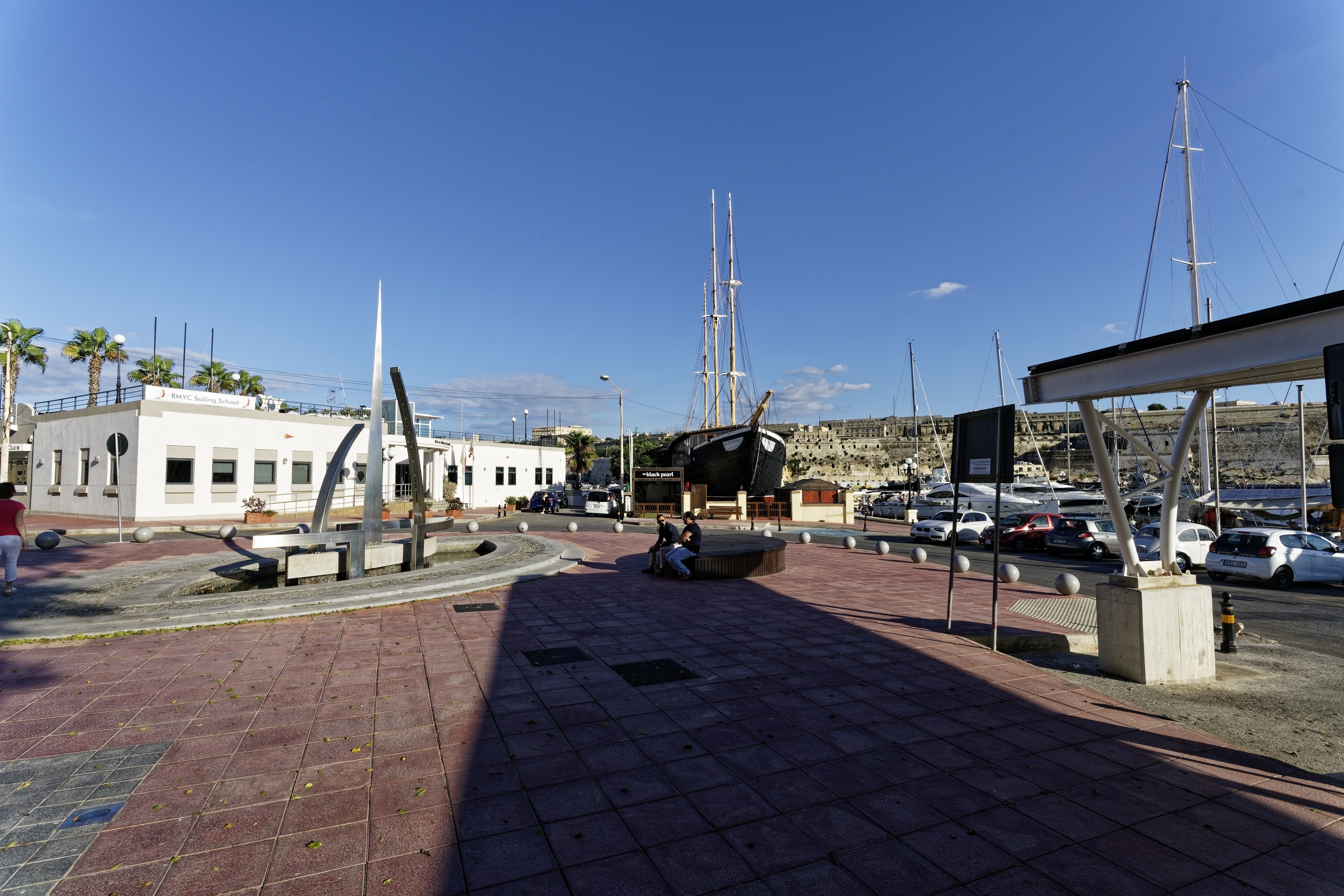
Royal Malta Yacht Club - Ta' Xbiex Marina
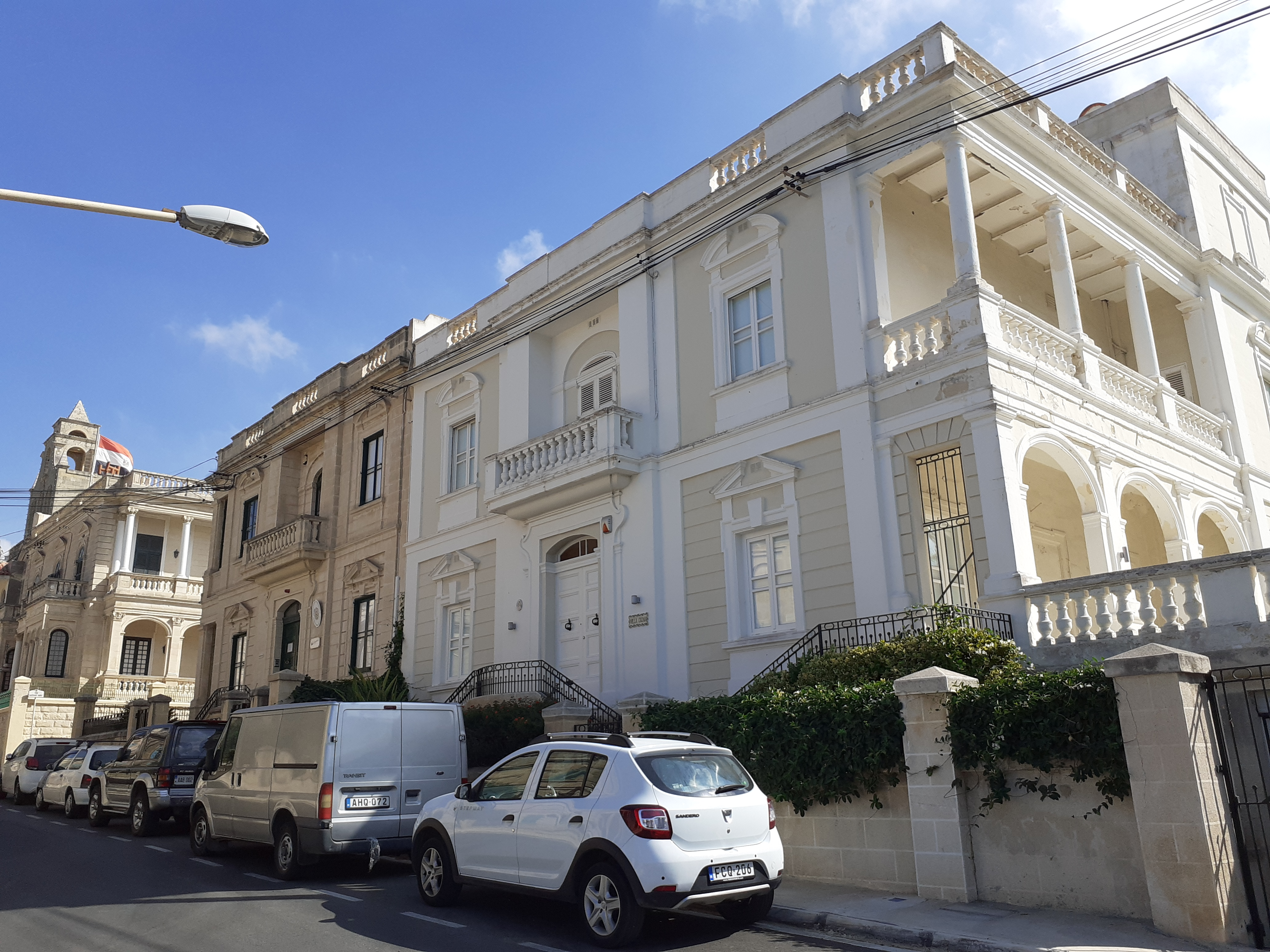
No. 6, Vjal Sir Temi Zammit

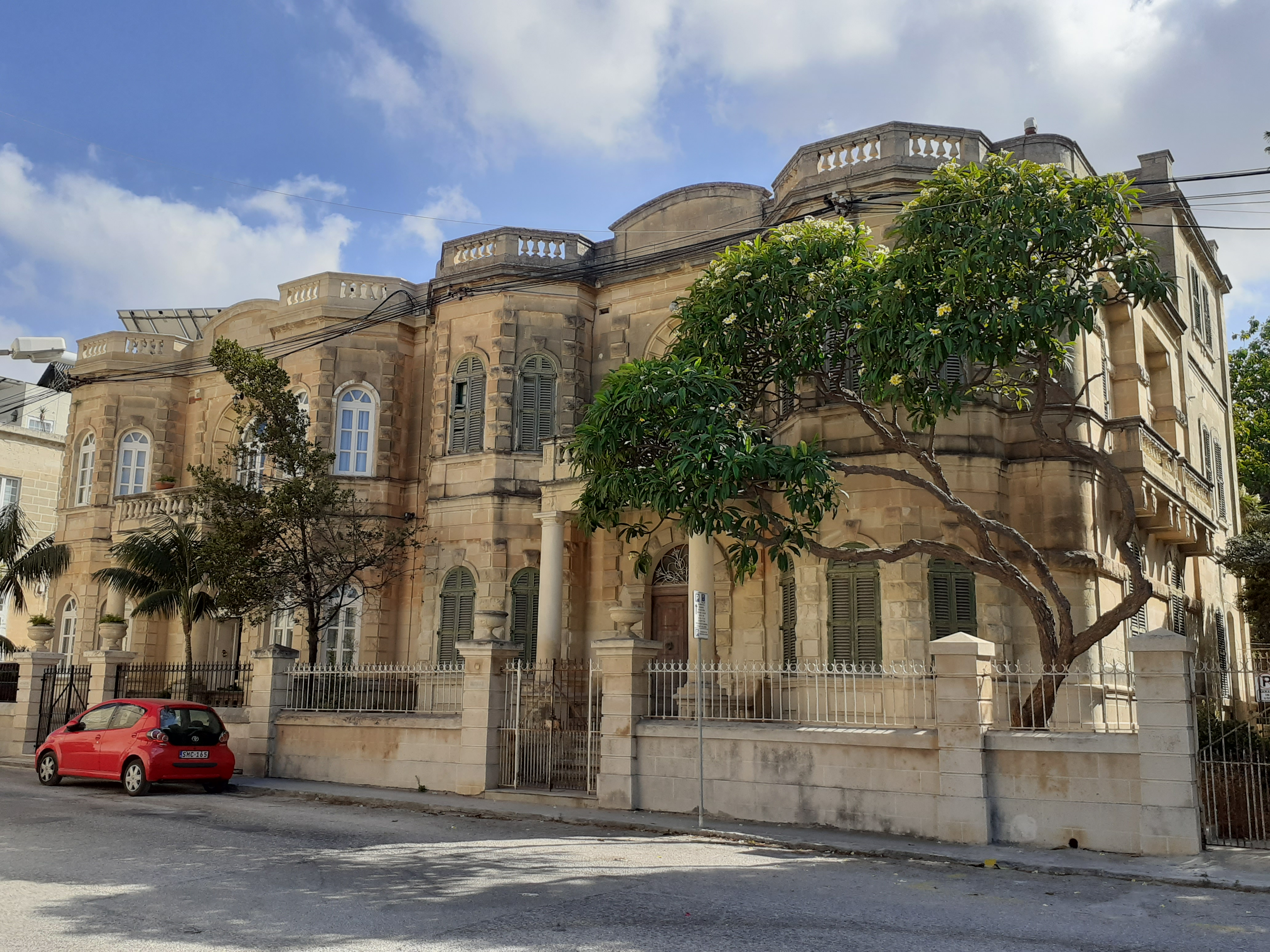
No. 4 Triq Sir Augustus Bartolo
