= Malta at the 1936 Summer Olympics =

- IOC code: MLT
- NOC: Malta Olympic Committee
- Website: www.nocmalta.org

in Berlin
- Competitors: 11 (men) in 2 sports
- Flag bearer: Godfrey Craig
- Medals: Gold 0 Silver 0 Bronze 0 Total 0

Summer Olympics appearances (overview)
- 1928; 1932; 1936; 1948; 1952–1956; 1960; 1964; 1968; 1972; 1976; 1980; 1984; 1988; 1992; 1996; 2000; 2004; 2008; 2012; 2016; 2020; 2024

Malta participated at the 1936 Summer Olympics in Berlin, Germany, held between 1 and 16 August 1936. The country's participation in the Games marked its second appearance at the Summer Olympics since its debut in the 1928 Games.

The Maltese team consisted of 11 athletes who competed in two sports. Godfrey Craig served as the country's flag-bearer during the opening ceremony. Malta had not won a Summer Olympics medal previously and did not win any medal in the current Games.

== Background ==
The 1928 Summer Olympics marked Malta's first participation in the Olympic Games. The Malta Olympic Committee was formed in 1928 just before the Games. After the nation made its debut in the Summer Olympics at the 1928 edition, it missed the next edition in 1932. This edition of the Games in 1936 marked the nation's second appearance and return to the Summer Games.

The 1936 Summer Olympics was held in Berlin, Germany, between 1 and 16 August 1936. The Maltese delegation consisted of 11 athletes. Godfrey Craig served as the country's flag-bearer in the Parade of Nations during the opening ceremony. Malta had not previously won an Olympic Games medal and did not win any medal in the current Games.

== Competitors ==
Malta sent a delegation of 11 athletes (all men) who competed in two events across two sports at the Games.

Sport	Men	Women	Athletes
Athletics	2	0	2
Water polo	9	0	9
Total	11	0	11

== Athletics ==
The athletic competitions were held at the Olympiastadion in Berlin. For Malta, Alfred Bencini and Austin Cassar-Torreggiani took part in the men's 100 m competition. Bencini was 19 years old and Cassar-Torreggiani was 21 years old with both of them competing in their first Summer Games. In the event, Bencini finished fifth and last in the eighth heat and Cassar-Torreggiani recorded a similar finish in the twelfth heat. Thus, both of them failed to advance beyond the first round.

Athlete	Event	Heats		Quarterfinals		Semifinals		Finals	
Athlete	Event	Time	Rank (Note: The ranks indicate the position of the athletes in the respective heats)	Time	Rank	Time	Rank	Time	Rank
Alfred Bencini	Men's 100 m	NS	5	Did not advance					
Austin Cassar-Torreggiani	Men's 100 m	NS	5	Did not advance					

== Water polo ==
Water polo competitions were held between 8 and 15 August at Schwimmstadion, Reichssportfeld, Berlin. There were 16 teams in the competition. The format consisted of a series of round-robin elimination pools, followed by round-robin semi-finals with the top teams from each group advancing to the gold medal match. As a part of Group B in the initial round robin competitions, Malta lost all three matches to finish last and exit the competition.

Squad

Malta
- Richard Fiorini Lowell (captain)
- Jimmy Chetcuti
- Joseph Demicoli
- Jack Frendo Azzopardi
- Alfred Lanzon
- Babsie Podestá
- Wilfred Podestá
- Pippo Schembri
- Sydney Scott
- Frank Wismayer

Summary

Team	Event	Group Stage				Semi final	Final / BM		
Team	Event	Opposition Score	Opposition Score	Opposition Score	Rank	Opposition Score	Rank	Opposition Score	Rank
Malta	Men's tournament	Great Britain; L 2–8	Hungary; L 0–12	Yugoslavia; L 0–7	3	Did not qualify			

Legend

- W = Win; L = Loss; D = Draw; Q – Qualified for the next phase

Group stage

Rank	Team	Pld	W	D	L	GF	GA	Pts	(Hungary)	(United Kingdom)	(Kingdom of Yugoslavia)	(Malta)
1.	Hungary	3	3	0	0	26	2	6	X	10:1	4:1	12:0
2.	Great Britain	3	2	0	1	13	15	4	1:10	X	4:3	8:2
3.	Yugoslavia	3	1	0	2	11	8	2	1:4	3:4	X	7:0
4.	Malta	3	0	0	3	2	27	0	0:12	2:8	0:7	X
