= Deaths in May 1991 =

The following is a list of notable deaths in May 1991.

Entries for each day are listed alphabetically by surname. A typical entry lists information in the following sequence:

- Name, age, country of citizenship at birth, subsequent country of citizenship (if applicable), reason for notability, cause of death (if known), and reference.

== May 1991 ==
=== 1 ===
- Jack Cope, 77, South African writer.
- Charles Sutherland Elton, 91, English zoologist.
- Frank N. Ikard, 78, American politician, member of the U.S. House of Representatives (1951–1961), heart attack.
- Mary McAllister, 82, American silent film actress.
- Cesare Merzagora, 92, Italian politician, acting president (1964).
- Richard Thorpe, 95, American film director.

=== 2 ===
- Gábor Boróczi, 52, Hungarian Olympic ice hockey player (1964).
- Richard Threlkeld Cox, 92, American physicist.
- Robert Elter, 92, Luxembourgish Olympic footballer (1920, 1924).
- Susan Fassbender, 32, English singer, suicide.
- Jens Haugland, 81, Norwegian politician.
- Charles Kaufman, 86, American screenwriter, pneumonia.
- Abby Crawford Milton, 110, American suffragist and supercentenarian.
- James Augustine Walsh, 84, American district judge (United States District Court for the District of Arizona).

=== 3 ===
- Harry Gibson, 75, American musician, heart failure.
- Eric Guy, 58, Australian rules footballer.
- Truus Klapwijk, 87, Dutch Olympic swimmer (1924, 1928).
- Jerzy Kosiński, 57, Polish-American novelist (Being There, The Painted Bird, Steps), suicide by asphyxiation.
- Frank Leja, 55, American baseball player (New York Yankees, Los Angeles Angels), heart attack.
- Günther Noack, 78, German figure skater.
- Yolande Plancke, 82, French Olympic sprinter (1928).
- Carlos Márquez Sterling, 92, Cuban politician.
- Margaret Tallichet, 77, American actress, cancer.
- Don Whitmire, 68, American navy officer and college football player.

=== 4 ===
- Dennis Crosby, 56, American actor and singer, son of Bing Crosby, suicide by gunshot.
- George T. Delacorte Jr., 96, American magazine publisher.
- Luigi Facelli, 92, Italian hurdler and Olympian (1924, 1928, 1932, 1936).
- Mohammed Khadda, 61, Algerian artist, lung cancer.
- Bill Macdonald, 62, American baseball player (Pittsburgh Pirates).
- Chandravadan Mehta, 90, Indian playwright and author.
- Eugene P. Spellman, 60, American district judge (United States District Court for the Southern District of Florida).
- Xiaocun Sun, 84, Chinese politician.
- Mohammed Abdel Wahab, 89, Egyptian singer, stroke.
- Bernie Winters, 60, English comedian, stomach cancer.

=== 5 ===
- Rolf Bremer, 64, German politician.
- Chaim Gross, 89, Austrian-American sculptor and educator, heart attack.
- Hermann Kopf, 89, German politician.
- Jimmy Lile, 57, American knifemaker.
- Rune Lindblad, 67, Swedish composer.
- Rolf Lund, 60, Norwegian Olympic sailor (1972).
- Richard A. Teague, 67, American automobile designer.

=== 6 ===
- Mehrdad Avesta, 60, Iranian poet, heart attack.
- Virgil Calotescu, 63, Romanian film director.
- Thomas A. Carlin, 62, American actor (Caddyshack, The Pope of Greenwich Village, Ragtime).
- Konstantinos Engolfopoulos, 79, Greek navy officer.
- Wilfrid Hyde-White, 87, British actor (My Fair Lady, The Third Man, Buck Rogers in the 25th Century), heart failure.
- Guido Martina, 85, Italian comic writer.
- Chucky Mullins, 21, American football player and quadriplegic, pulmonary embolism.
- Béla Pósa, 76, Hungarian footballer.
- Herbert Schäfer, 63, German footballer and Olympian (1952, 1956).

=== 7 ===
- Martín Alarcón, 63, Mexican Olympic long-distance runner (1948).
- Hans Bender, 84, German parapsychologist.
- Lucien Duquesne, 90, French Olympic runner (1920, 1924, 1928).
- Glenn Eagleston, 70, American flying ace.
- Fred Eggan, 84, American anthropologist.
- Bill McPeak, 64, American football player (Pittsburgh Steelers), heart attack.
- Alexandre Prigogine, 78, Russian mineralogist and ornithologist.
- Wolfgang Reichmann, 59, German actor, heart attack.
- István Zsolt, 69, Hungarian football referee.

=== 8 ===
- Hans Arnold, 49, German footballer.
- Edward G. Breen, 82, American politician, member of the U.S. House of Representatives (1949–1951).
- Ralph Theodore Breyer, 87, American Olympic swimmer (1924).
- Ronnie Brody, 72, British actor.
- Joseph Kramm, 83, American playwright.
- Hilde Krüger, 78, German actress.
- Jean Langlais, 84, French composer.
- Ronald McKie, 81, Australian novelist, kidney disease.
- Mireille Perrey, 87, French stage and film actress.
- Michel Robida, 81, French writer.
- Rudolf Serkin, 88, Austrian-American pianist, cancer.
- Cedric Tallis, 76, American baseball executive, heart attack.
- Alun Thomas, 65, Welsh rugby player.
- Friedelind Wagner, 73, German opera director.

=== 9 ===
- Loran Ellis Baker, 85, Canadian politician, member of the House of Commons of Canada (1945-1949).
- Yanka Dyagileva, 24, Russian poet and singer-songwriter, suicide.
- Charles Fox, 69-70, English jazz critic.
- Flip Keegstra, 76, Dutch Olympic sailor (1948, 1952).
- István Messzi, 29, Hungarian Olympic weightlifter (1988), traffic collision.
- Adrian Anthony Spears, 80, American district judge (United States District Court for the Western District of Texas).
- Ross Story, 71, Australian politician.

=== 10 ===
- Béla Balassa, 63, Hungarian economist.
- Thomas Leather, 80, Australian cricket player.
- Georg Strobl, 81, German ice hockey player and Olympic medalist (1932, 1936).
- Teisutis Zikaras, 68, Lithuanian-Australian sculptor.

=== 11 ===
- Ho Dam, 62, North Korean politician.
- Dino Di Luca, 88, Italian actor.
- Jusuf Hatunić, 40, Yugoslav football player.
- Friedrich Issak, 75, Estonian javelin thrower and journalist.
- Peter Mangels, 63, Brazilian Olympic sailor (1952).
- Denis Zanoni, 50, Australian rules footballer.

=== 12 ===
- Danny Little Bear, 53, American professional wrestler, liver cancer.
- Leland Hickman, 56, American poet, AIDS.
- Clive Johnston, 65, Australian cricketer.
- Deny King, 81, Australian naturalist, environmentalist, and painter, heart attack.
- Aleksander Niezabitowski, 82, Polish footballer.
- Konstantin Sokolsky, 86, Latvian singer.

=== 13 ===
- Abderrahmane Farès, 80, Algerian politician.
- Hal Gregg, 69, American baseball player (Brooklyn Dodgers, Pittsburgh Pirates, New York Giants).
- David Mercer MacDougall, 86, Hong Kong politician.
- Delia Parodi, 78, Argentine politician.
- László Szomjas, 86, Hungarian Olympic sports shooter (1924).
- Carl Weinrich, 86, American organist.

=== 14 ===
- Giampiero Albertini, 63, Italian actor, heart attack.
- Joy Batchelor, 77, English animator.
- Agehananda Bharati, 68, American Hindu monk and anthropologist, cancer.
- Omar Truman Burleson, 85, American politician, member of the U.S. House of Representatives (1947–1978).
- José Carvalhosa, 80, Portuguese Olympic equestrian (1952).
- Aladár Gerevich, 81, Hungarian Olympic fencer (1932, 1936, 1948, 1952, 1956, 1960).
- High Echelon, 24, American thoroughbred racehorse.
- Jiang Qing, 77, Chinese actress and politician, widow of Mao Zedong, suicide by hanging.
- José María Rodero, 68, Spanish actor.
- Frank Sanucci, 90, Argentine-American composer.
- Louis Stynen, 84, Belgian architect.

=== 15 ===
- Shintarō Abe, 67, Japanese politician, liver cancer.
- Reno Browne, 70, American actress, cancer.
- Amadou Hampâté Bâ, 90-91, Malian writer and ethnologist.
- Andreas Floer, 34, German mathematician, suicide.
- Ken Jones, 88, American baseball player (Detroit Tigers, Boston Braves).
- Ronald Lacey, 55, English actor (Raiders of the Lost Ark, Red Sonja, The Adventures of Buckaroo Banzai Across the 8th Dimension), liver cancer.
- Kalindi Charan Panigrahi, 89, Indian writer.
- Fritz Riess, 68, German racing driver.
- Fraser Sweatman, 77, Canadian figure skater and Olympian (1936).
- Ed Weir, 88, American gridiron football player (Frankford Yellow Jackets).
- William Williamson, 75, Canadian Olympic canoeist (1936).
- İhsan Yüce, 62, Turkish actor.
- Vukašin Šoškoćanin, 32, Yugoslav military commander, drowned.

=== 16 ===
- Jim Bicknell, 80, Australian rules footballer.
- Rufe Persful, 84, American criminal.
- Herbert Schäfer, 63, German football player.
- Willem Jacob Visser, 76, Dutch linguist.
- Osmar White, 82, Australian journalist.

=== 17 ===
- Jean Charles Snoy et d'Oppuers, 83, Belgian diplomat.
- Maurie Dunstan, 62, Australian footballer.
- Göthe Grefbo, 69, Swedish actor.
- G. Evelyn Hutchinson, 88, English ecologist.
- Herman Kalckar, 83, Danish biochemist.
- Harry Rée, 76, British academic.
- Ross Somerville, 88, Canadian golfer.
- Tom Trana, 53, Swedish rally driver, cancer.
- Ilse Trautschold, 85, German actress.

=== 18 ===
- Gerd Achgelis, 82, German aviator.
- Edwina Booth, 86, American actress.
- Muriel Box, 85, English screenwriter and director.
- Nicholas Elko, 81, American Catholic prelate.
- Litzi Friedmann, 81, Austrian spy for the Soviet Union.
- Gunnar Johansson, 85, Swedish composer.
- Rudolf Nierlich, 25, Austrian skier (1988), traffic collision.
- Jimmy Thomson, 64, Canadian ice hockey player (Toronto Maple Leafs, Chicago Black Hawks), heart attack.
- Hoang Van Hoan, 85-86, Vietnamese politician.

=== 19 ===
- Gabino Arregui, 76, Argentine footballer.
- Lloyd Butler, 66, American Olympic rower (1948).
- Odia Coates, 49, American singer, breast cancer.
- Royce Goodbread, 83, American football player.
- Wim Lakenberg, 70, Dutch football player.
- Mario Panzeri, 79, Italian composer.
- Greg Rice, 75, American long-distance runner, stroke.
- Nexhmedin Zajmi, 75, Albanian artist.

=== 20 ===
- Milko Bambič, 86, Italian artist.
- Bill Champion, 69, American racing driver.
- Zdzisław Kostrzewa, 35, Polish footballer.
- Joseph J. Maraziti, 78, American politician, member of the U.S. House of Representatives (1973–1975).
- Pete Runnels, 63, American baseball player (Washington Senators, Boston Red Sox, Houston Colt .45s), stroke.

=== 21 ===
- Ioan P. Culianu, 41, Romanian historian and philosopher, shot.
- Nicholas Dante, 49, American dancer and writer, AIDS.
- Rajiv Gandhi, 46, Indian politician, prime minister (1984–1989), suicide bombing.
- Julián Orbón, 65, Cuban composer, cancer.
- Sam Pothecary, 85, English cricketer.
- Kalaivani Rajaratnam, 22, Sri Lankan assassin of Rajiv Gandhi.

=== 22 ===
- Lino Brocka, 52, Filipino film director, traffic collision.
- Shripad Amrit Dange, 91, Indian politician.
- Valentin Iremonger, 73, Irish diplomat and poet.
- Derrick Henry Lehmer, 86, American mathematician.
- Jacob Millman, 79-80, Ukrainian-American electrical engineer.
- Stan Mortensen, 69, English footballer.
- Stan Richards, 59-60, American sportscaster.
- Ernie Robinson, 83, English footballer.
- René Soulier, 79, French Olympic middle-distance runner (1936).
- Clarrie White, 77, Australian rules footballer.

=== 23 ===
- Manning Clark, 76, Australian historian.
- Henri Dauban de Silhouette, 90, British Olympic javelin thrower (1924).
- David H. Frisch, 73, American nuclear physicist.
- Wilhelm Kempff, 95, German pianist.
- René Lefèvre, 93, French actor.
- Fletcher Markle, 70, Canadian filmmaker, heart failure.
- Edmond Michiels, 77, Belgian Olympic water polo player (1936).
- Kemal Satır, 80, Turkish politician.
- Jean Van Houtte, 84, Belgian politician, prime minister (1952–1954).

=== 24 ===
- John Anderton, 61, South African Olympic sprinter (1952).
- Mo Bassett, 60, American football player (Cleveland Browns).
- Gene Clark, 46, American Hall of Fame singer (The Byrds), and songwriter ("Eight Miles High", "I'll Feel a Whole Lot Better"), peptic ulcer disease.
- Bill Flynn, 83, Australian rules footballer.
- Pat Scantlebury, 73, Panamanian-American baseball player (Cincinnati Redlegs).
- Juozas Ūdras, 66, Lithuanian Olympic fencer (1952, 1956).

=== 25 ===
- Lorne MacLaine Campbell, 88, Scottish army officer.
- Eddie Fullerton, 56, Irish politician, shot.
- Gunnar Johansen, 85, Danish-American pianist, liver cancer.
- Bob Merrick, 73, Australian rules footballer.
- Doug Nott, 79, American football player (Boston Redskins, Detroit Lions).

=== 26 ===
- Aleksandar Benko, 66, Yugoslav footballer.
- José Caballero, 75, Spanish painter.
- Doris M. Curtis, 77, American geologist.
- Claudine Dupuis, 67, French actress.
- Tom Eyen, 50, American playwright and lyricist (Dreamgirls), AIDS.
- Ossie Green, 85, Australian rules footballer.
- Tim Landers, 80, Irish footballer.
- Eugène Lourié, 88, French filmmaker, stroke.
- Kisaburo Osawa, 80-81, Japanese aikido teacher.
- John Price, 71, American competitive sailor and Olympic silver medalist (1952).
- Wilfrid Roberts, 90, British politician.
- Jean Salmon, 93, French Olympic equestrian (1956).
- Nick Wasnie, 88, Canadian ice hockey player.
- Hailu Yimenu, Ethiopian politician, suicide.
- Notable victims of Lauda Air Flight 004:
  - Clemens August Andreae, 62, Austrian economist and college professor.
  - Pairat Decharin, 54, Thai politician, governor of Chiang Mai Province (since 1987).

=== 27 ===
- Ed Dodd, 88, American cartoonist (Mark Trail).
- Eric Heffer, 69, British politician.
- Johnny Heimsch, 88, American football player.
- Herman Struve Hensel, 89, American lawyer, heart failure.
- Elimar Kloos, 83, German Olympic boxer (1928).
- Leopold Nowak, 86, Austrian musicologist.

=== 28 ===
- Henrik Avellan, 89, Finnish Olympic modern pentathlete (1924, 1928).
- Roy Cullenbine, 77, American baseball player, heart disease.
- Garton Hone, 90, Australian tennis player.
- Victor Aloysius Meyers, 93, American politician and musician.
- Ethel L. Payne, 79, American journalist, editor, and foreign correspondent.
- Walter Steinbauer, 45, German bobsledder and Olympic medalist (1972).

=== 29 ===
- Margaret Barr, 86, Australian choreographer.
- Peter Betz, 61, German Olympic rower (1952).
- Coral Browne, 77, Australian-American actress (An Englishman Abroad, Dreamchild, The Ruling Class), breast cancer.
- Rudolf Dobrijević, 85, Yugoslavian footballer.
- Harry Haenigsen, 90, American illustrator and cartoonist (Penny).
- Josef Lošek, 79, Czech Olympic cyclist (1936).
- Andrew Mensaros, 69, Australian politician.
- John Tronolone, 80, American mobster (Cleveland crime family).
- Henry Walston, Baron Walston, 78, British politician.

=== 30 ===
- Edgar Bodenheimer, 83, German-American author and law professor.
- Filip Bonačić, 80, Yugoslavian Olympic water polo player (1936).
- Manolo Gómez Bur, 74, Spanish actor.
- Federico De Luca, 77, Italian Olympic sailor (1936).
- Uma Shankar Dikshit, 90, Indian politician.
- Walter Dirks, 90, German theologian.
- Roland V. Libonati, 93, American politician, member of the U.S. House of Representatives (1957–1965).
- Jim Magnuson, 44, American baseball player (Chicago White Sox, New York Yankees), alcohol poisoning.
- Eugene Oberst, 89, American football player, javelin thrower, and Olympic medalist (1924).
- Lafayette G. Pool, 71, American tank commander.

=== 31 ===
- Rubens Josué da Costa, 62, Brazilian football player.
- Ronald Garvey, 87, British colonial administrator.
- Sherrill Halbert, 89, American district judge.
- Magnus Hestenes, 85, American mathematician.
- Ian Milner, 79, New Zealand political scientist and alleged KGB spy.
- Robert Schlapp, 91, British physicist.
- Hans Schwartz, 78, German footballer.
- Angus Wilson, 77, English novelist, stroke.
- Artur Woźniak, 77, Polish football player.
- Yuri Zhukov, 83, Soviet journalist, publicist and political figure.
- Paul Ziffren, 77, American lawyer and sports administrator, congestive heart failure.
