= Deaths in September 2005 =

The following is a list of notable deaths in September 2005.

Entries for each day are listed alphabetically by surname. A typical entry lists information in the following sequence:

- Name, age, country of citizenship at birth, subsequent country of citizenship (if applicable), reason for notability, cause of death (if known), and reference.

== September 2005 ==
=== 1 ===
- Terry Albritton, 50, American shotputter.
- Manuel Ausensi, 85, Spanish opera singer.
- R. L. Burnside, 78, American blues musician.
- Barry Cowsill, 50, American pop-singer and writer, victim of Hurricane Katrina. (body discovered on this date)
- Raj Kamal, 77, Indian composer, Alzheimer's disease.
- Yang Kuan, 91, Chinese historian.
- Jacob Akiba Marinsky, 87, American chemist, co-discoverer of the element Promethium, multiple myeloma.
- Tacariju de Paula, 88, Brazilian Olympic sailor (1952).
- Zdobysław Stawczyk, 82, Polish Olympic sprinter (1952).
- Jack D. Walker, 83, American politician and physician.

=== 2 ===
- Tom Bailey, 56, American gridiron footballer (Florida State Seminoles, Philadelphia Eagles), heart attack and complications from atherosclerosis.
- Bob Denver, 70, American actor (Gilligan's Island, The Many Loves of Dobie Gillis, The Good Guys), throat cancer.
- Adrian Karsten, 45, American ESPN announcer, suicide by hanging.
- Thure Lindgren, 84, Swedish ski jumper and Olympian (1952).
- Petr Lohnický, 64, Czech Olympic swimmer (1964).
- Alexandru Paleologu, 86, Romanian diplomat.

=== 3 ===
- Juan Carmona, 73, Chilean Olympic rower (1956).
- R. S. R. Fitter, 92, British natural historian.
- Robert W. Funk, 79, American biblical scholar, founder of the Jesus Seminar, lung failure.
- Edward Hepple, 91, Australian actor, producer, director, playwright and television scriptwriter.
- Bernard S. Meyer, 89, American lawyer and politician.
- Jens Nygård, 71, Norwegian Olympic sports shooter (1972).
- William Rehnquist, 80, American lawyer and jurist, Chief Justice of the United States, thyroid cancer.
- James Rossi, 69, American Olympic cyclist (1956, 1960).
- Ekkehard Schall, 75, German actor.
- Fernando Távora, 82, Portuguese architect and professor.

=== 4 ===
- Kenneth R. Andrews, 89, American business writers and academic.
- Lloyd Avery II, 36, American actor (Boyz n the Hood) and convicted murderer, strangled.
- Nancy Buttfield, 92, Australian politician.
- Thomas Alonzo Clark, 84, American circuit judge.
- Grigóris Grigoríou, 86, Greek screenwriter and film director.
- Roseli Ocampo-Friedmann, 67, Filipino-American microbiologist and botanist, Parkinson's disease.
- Alan Truscott, 80, British bridge player, writer, and editor, one of the best known bridge columnists.
- Arnold Weinstein, 78, American poet, playwright, and librettist, liver cancer.

=== 5 ===
- Hank Anderson, 84, American basketball coach and athletics director (Gonzaga Bulldogs, Montana State Bobcats).
- Donald Hains, 89, Canadian Olympic sailor (1952).
- Walther Heissig, 91, Austrian mongolist.
- Bubba McCollum, 52, American football player (Houston Oilers).
- Heinz Melkus, 77, East German race car driver and constructor of sport cars.
- Rizal Nurdin, 57, Indonesian politician, Governor of North Sumatra, Mandala Airlines Flight 091 crash.
- Raja Inal Siregar, 67, Indonesian politician, former Governor of North Sumatra, Indonesia, Mandala Airlines Flight 091 crash.

=== 6 ===
- Eugenia Charles, 86, Dominican politician, Prime Minister (1980–1995), pulmonary embolism.
- Karl Vorse Krombein, 93, American entomologist.
- Mark Matthews, 111, American supercentenarian and Army first Sergeant, oldest living Buffalo Soldier.
- Dhan Singh Thapa, 77, Indian Army officer and recipient of the Param Vir Chakra.
- Bob Warlick, 64, American basketball player.

=== 7 ===
- Omar Ali-Shah, 82/3, Afghan Sufi teacher.
- Moussa Arafat, 65, Palestinian former head of general security in Gaza, cousin of Yasser Arafat, shot.
- Desmond Cleary, 80, Irish footballer and Olympian (1948).
- Sergio Endrigo, 72, Italian singer and songwriter ("Canzone per te", "L'arca di Noè", "Io che amo solo te"), cancer.
- Joe Kodba, 83, American football player (Baltimore Colts).
- Nicolino Locche, 66, Argentine world boxing champion, heart attack.
- Marion Miller, 92, Canadian Olympic alpine skier (1936).
- Edoardo Mulargia, 79, Italian director (Escape from Hell, W Django!) and screenwriter (Challenge of the McKennas).
- L. J. K. Setright, 74, British motoring journalist, lung cancer.
- Norman Wylie, Lord Wylie, 81, Scottish politician, Lord Advocate (1970–1974).
- Finnbogi Ísakson, 62, Faroese journalist, writer, and politician.

=== 8 ===
- Boris Bittker, 88, American legal academic.
- Fiona Campbell, 76, British Olympic alpine skier (1952).
- Noel Cantwell, 73, Irish soccer player, former Manchester United captain, cancer.
- Stanley Dancer, 78, American harness racing driver and trainer, prostate cancer.
- Donald Horne, 83, Australian academic, historian, philosopher and intellectual, pulmonary fibrosis.
- Milena Hübschmannová, 72, Czech professor of Romani studies, traffic collision.
- Hans Keiter, 95, German field handball player and Olympian (1936).
- Ralph Knoesen, 64, South African Olympic boxer (1960).
- David Pearce, 63, British economist, leukemia.
- Lewis E. Platt, 64, American businessman and former Hewlett-Packard CEO, intracranial aneurysm.

=== 9 ===
- Giuliano Bonfante, 101, Italian linguistics expert.
- John Wayne Glover, 72, Australian convicted serial killer nicknamed "The Granny Killer", suicide by hanging.
- André Pousse, 85, French actor, traffic collision.
- Mel Wanzo, 74, American jazz trombonist.
- Xiong Xianghui, 86, Chinese Communist Party spy during the Chinese Civil War.

=== 10 ===
- Theodore X. Barber, 78, American psychologist known for his critical studies of hypnosis, ruptured aorta.
- Hermann Bondi, 85, Austrian-British mathematician and cosmologist.
- Clarence "Gatemouth" Brown, 81, American blues musician.
- Jónas Halldórsson, 91, Icelandic Olympic water polo player (1936).
- Wilbur Jackett, 93, Canadian public servant and jurist. First chief justice of the Federal Court of Canada.
- Erich Kuby, 95, German journalist, publisher and screenwriter.
- Lea Nikel, 86, Israeli abstract artist.
- Charlie Williams, 61, American Major League Baseball umpire, complications of diabetes.
- Emerson Stewart Williams, 95, American modernist architect.
- Loren Wright, 88, American basketball player.

=== 11 ===
- Messias José Baptista, 37, Brazilian triple jumper and Olympian (1996), leukemia.
- Al Casey, 89, American jazz guitarist, colon cancer.
- Steve de Shazer, 65, American psychotherapist, developer of solution focused brief therapy.
- Abdallah Ibrahim, 87, Moroccan politician, Prime Minister (1958-1960).
- Naphtali Lewis, 93, American papyrologist and egyptologist.
- Chris Schenkel, 82, American sportscaster, emphysema.
- Henryk Tomaszewski, 91, Polish graphic artist.

=== 12 ===
- Juan Carlos Anderson, 92, Argentine Olympic sprinter (1936).
- Helmut Baierl, 78, German playwright.
- Honey Bruce, 78, American stripper and showgirl, colitis.
- Serge Lang, 78, American mathematician and political activist.
- Ronald Leigh-Hunt, 88, British actor.
- Lenora Mandella, 74, American baseball player.
- Alain Polaniok, 46, French footballer.
- Katherine Sanford, 90, American biologist.
- Fritz Schilgen, 99, German athlete and final Olympic torchbearer at the 1936 Summer Games.
- Erich Schöppner, 73, German Olympic boxer (1952).
- John Slade, 97, American Olympic field hockey player (1948).
- Haydee Yorac, 64, Filipino lawyer and public servant, ovarian cancer.

=== 13 ===
- Julio César Turbay Ayala, 89, Colombian lawyer and politician, President (1978–1982).
- Hong Deok-young, 84, South Korean football player, manager, referee, and Olympian (1948).
- Tom Felleghy, 83, Hungarian-born Italian actor (Four Flies on Grey Velvet, The Cat o' Nine Tails, The Big Gundown).
- Toni Fritsch, 60, Austrian-American gridiron football player (Dallas Cowboys, San Diego Chargers, Houston Oilers, New Orleans Saints), cardioplegia, heart attack.
- Fiorella Ghilardotti, 59, Italian socialist politician and trade unionist, sudden illness.
- Cyril Harris, 68, South African rabbi, cancer.
- Hans-Joachim Koellreutter, 90, Brazilian composer and musicologist.
- Chieko Nakakita, 79, Japanese actress (Drunken Angel, The Quiet Duel, When a Woman Ascends the Stairs).

=== 14 ===
- William Berenberg, 89, American physician, professor of pediatrics, emeritus, at Harvard Medical School.
- Toni Fritsch, 60, Austrian footballer and American football player.
- Henry Kaplan, 79, American television director.
- Frances Newton, 40, American convict, first African American woman executed in Texas since 1858, lethal injection.
- Mirai, 22, Japanese professional wrestler, accidental drowning.
- Pavel Andreyevich Taran, 88, Soviet and Russian bomber pilot during World War II and war hero.
- Vladimir Volkoff, 72, French-Russian spy novelist.
- Mary Wade, 77, Australian palaeontologist.
- Robert Wise, 91, American film director (The Sound of Music, West Side Story, The Day the Earth Stood Still), Oscar winner (1962), heart failure.

=== 15 ===
- Samuel Azu Crabbe, 77, Ghanaian jurist, Chief Justice of Ghana (1973-1977).
- Lennart Ekdahl, 92, Swedish Olympic sailor (1936).
- Guy Green, 91, British film director and noted cinematographer, kidney failure.
- Walther Heissig, 91, Austrian mongolist.
- Jeronimas Kačinskas, 98, Lithuanian-American classical composer and conductor.
- Sidney Luft, 89, American film producer, Judy Garland's third and last surviving husband, heart attack.
- Franko Luin, 64, Slovenian-Swedish typographer and type designer.
- Agim Murati, 52, Albanian football striker player.

=== 16 ===
- Bob Agler, 81, American football player (Los Angeles Rams).
- Lou Almada, 98, American baseball player.
- Stanley Burnshaw, 99, American poet and literary figure.
- Howell Cobb, 82, American district judge (United States District Court for the Eastern District of Texas).
- Harry Freedman, 83, Polish-Canadian composer, English hornist, and music educator, cancer.
- Gordon Gould, 85, American pioneer in laser technology.
- Jay M. Gould, 90, American epidemiologist and anti-nuclear activist, heart disease.
- Arkadiusz Gołaś, 24, Polish volleyball player and Olympian (2004), traffic collision.
- Jean-Claude Guiguet, 65, French film director and screenwriter, cancer.
- Donald S. Harrington, 91, American politician and religious leader.
- Harold Q. Masur, 96, American novelist.
- John McMullen, 87, American businessman, naval architect and Major League Baseball executive.
- Constance Moore, 85, American actress (Buck Rogers).
- Mzukisi Sikali, 34, South African boxer, stabbed.
- Jerzy Sołtan, 92, Polish architect.
- F. K. Waechter, 67, German cartoonist, author, and playwright.

=== 17 ===
- Donn Clendenon, 70, American baseball player, MVP of the 1969 World Series, leukemia.
- Hermidita, 80, Spanish football player.
- Thorstein Kråkenes, 81, Norwegian competition rower and Olympic medalist (1948, 1952).
- Jacques Lacarrière, 79, French author and classical translator.
- Ray Lemek, 71, American gridiron football player (Notre Dame Fighting Irish, Washington Redskins, Pittsburgh Steelers).
- Jack Lesberg, 85, American jazz bassist.
- Les Perry, 82, Australian Olympic long-distance runner (1952, 1956).
- Alfred Reed, 84, American neo-classical composer.
- S. L. Puram Sadanandan, 77, Indian playwright and film scriptwriter, India.

=== 18 ===
- Richard Britton, 35, Irish motorcycle racer.
- Richard E. Cunha, 83, American cinematographer and director.
- Sandra Feldman, 65, American advocate for disadvantaged students, teacher and labor leader, breast cancer.
- Frank Fields, 91, American double bass player.
- Joel Hirschhorn, 67, American Academy Award-winning songwriter.
- Richard Holden, 74, Canadian lawyer and politician, suicide.
- Noel Mander, 93, British organ maker and restorer.
- Otto Friedrich August Meinardus, 79, German coptologist, pastor and author.
- Michael Park, 39, British rally co-pilot, rally accident.
- Rupert Riedl, 80, Austrian zoologist and advocate of evolutionary epistemology.
- Yegor Yakovlev, 75, Russian journalist, leading opponent of press censorship.

=== 19 ===
- John Bromfield, 83, American actor and commercial fisherman, renal failure.
- Masaharu Gotōda, 91, Japanese bureaucrat and politician, pneumonia.
- Marv Grissom, 87, American baseball player and pitching coach.
- Willie Hutch, 59, American record producer, singer and songwriter.
- Isao Nakauchi, 83, Japanese businessman, founder of Daiei, stroke.
- Alfons Oswald, 91, Swiss Olympic sailor (1948).
- John Rayner, 81, German-British rabbi.
- William Vacchiano, 93, American trumpeter and professor of music.

=== 20 ===
- Matest M. Agrest, 90, Russian mathematician and ethnologist.
- Yuri Aizenshpis, 60, Russian music manager and producer, liver cirrhosis.
- Joe Bauman, 83, American longtime minor league baseball recordholder (72 home runs in 1954), pneumonia.
- Gordon Carroll, 77, American film producer (Alien, Cool Hand Luke, Red Heat), heart attack.
- Charles L. Harness, 89, American science fiction writer.
- Tobias Schneebaum, 83, American writer, artist, and explorer.
- Simon Wiesenthal, 96, Austrian Holocaust survivor and nazi hunter and writer.

=== 21 ===
- Harry Heltzer, 94, American inventor, former CEO of 3M.
- Mustai Karim, 85, Soviet and Russian poet, writer and playwright.
- Vladimir Leontyev, 58, Soviet Russian sailor and Olympian (1972, 1976, 1980).
- Ramón Martín Huerta, 48, Mexican politician, minister of public security, helicopter crash.
- Preben Philipsen, 95, Danish film producer.
- Félix Javier Pérez, 33, Puerto Rican basketball player, shot.
- Joseph Smagorinsky, 81, American meteorologist and mathematician, complications of Parkinson's disease.
- Albert Tocco, 77, American convicted organized crime boss, stroke.
- Molly Yard, 93, American feminist, former president of the U.S. National Organization for Women.

=== 22 ===
- Monty Basgall, 83, American baseball player (Pittsburgh Pirates), and coach (Los Angeles Dodgers).
- Joop Doderer, 84, Dutch actor known for playing the character Swiebertje, heart attack.
- Heimo Erbse, 81, German composer.
- Bayaman Erkinbayev, 38, Kyrgyz former wrestler, businessman, and politician, shot.
- Annemarie Heinrich, 93, German-Argentine photographer.
- Lee Huber, 86, American basketball player.
- Leavander Johnson, 35, American former IBF lightweight boxing champion, brain injury suffered in bout.
- Silvano Meconi, 73, Italian shot putter and Olympian (1956, 1960, 1964).
- Reginald Dos Remedios, 82, Hong Kong sports shooter and Olympian (1964, 1976).
- Hans Samelson, 89, German-American mathematician.
- Dave Suminski, 74, American football player (Wisconsin Badgers, Washington Redskins, Chicago Cardinals).
- Mike Ulicny, 87, American baseball player (Boston Braves).
- Ivor Vice, 76, British Olympic gymnast (1948).

=== 23 ===
- John Knatchbull, 7th Baron Brabourne, 80, British television producer.
- Roger Brierley, 70, British actor (Young Sherlock Holmes, A Fish Called Wanda, About a Boy).
- Apolônio de Carvalho, 93, Brazilian socialist politician and founder of Brazil's Workers' Party.
- Betty Leslie-Melville, 78, American wildlife conservationist and giraffe expert, complications of dementia.
- Ivica Miljković, 58, Croatian football player.
- Filiberto Ojeda Ríos, 72, Puerto Rican nationalist and leader of the Boricua Popular Army, shot by the FBI.
- Jim Taylor, 85, Australian politician.

=== 24 ===
- Tommy Bond, 79, American actor known for playing Butch on Our Gang, heart disease.
- Leopold B. Felsen, 81, German leading physicist in the study of waves, holocaust survivor, complications of surgery.
- Gunnar Hansen, 81, Norwegian footballer.
- Byron Johnson, 94, American baseball player.
- Yuri Moiseyev, 65, Russian ice hockey player and Olympian (1968).
- Frank Smith, 77, American baseball player (Cincinnati Reds/Redlegs, St. Louis Cardinals).
- Sulo Suorttanen, 84, Finnish lawyer, civil servant and politician.
- André Testut, 79, Monegasque Formula One driver.
- Theodore L. Thomas, 85, American chemical engineer and patent attorney.
- Bala Usman, 59-60, Nigerian academic, politician and historian.

=== 25 ===
- Don Adams, 82, American actor (Get Smart, Inspector Gadget, Check It Out!), lymphoma.
- George Archer, 65, American golfer and 1969 Masters winner, Burkitt's lymphoma.
- Georges Arvanitas, 74, French-born Greek jazz pianist and composer.
- Sally Anne Bowman, 18, English hairdresser and model.
- Urie Bronfenbrenner, 88, Russian-American professor of psychology, complications of diabetes.
- Lou Carter, 87, American jazz pianist, composer, and songwriter.
- Leland Clark, 86, American biochemist.
- Ghulam Mustafa Khan, 93, Pakistani researcher, literary critic, linguist, author, and spiritual leader.
- Lionel Kochan, 83, British historian, leukemia.
- Steve Marcus, 66, American jazz saxophonist.
- M. Scott Peck, 69, American psychiatrist and author, pancreatic cancer.
- Friedrich Peter, 84, Austrian politician and Waffen-SS Obersturmführer during World War II, kidney failure.
- Franz Schönfels, 92, Austrian Olympic water polo player (1936).

=== 26 ===
- Helen Cresswell, 71, British author of children's literature, ovarian cancer.
- Henrik Flöjt, 53, Finnish biathlete, world champion and Olympic medalist (1976).
- Heidi Genée, 66, German film editor, director and screenwriter.
- Izuo Hayashi, 83, Japanese physicist.
- Jack Hill, 72, American football player (Utah State Aggies, Denver Broncos).
- Jozef Karel, 83, Slovak football player and coach.
- Lowell Wagner, 82, American football player (USC Trojans, New York Yankees, San Francisco 49ers).

=== 27 ===
- Jack Burmaster, 78, American basketball player and coach.
- Karl Decker, 84, Austrian football player, manager, and Olympian (1948).
- Ronald Golias, 76, Brazilian comedian.
- Jerry Juhl, 67, American writer and puppeteer (The Muppets, Sesame Street, Fraggle Rock), pancreatic cancer.
- Guy Leveque, 32, Canadian ice hockey player (Los Angeles Kings).
- John McCabe, 84, American biographer of Laurel and Hardy.
- Ronald Pearsall, 77, English author.
- Mary Lee Settle, 87, American author (the Beulah Quintet), lung cancer.
- Willem van de Sande Bakhuyzen, 47, Dutch film director, cancer.
- Roger Tréville, 102, French actor.

=== 28 ===
- Ahmad Abdullah, 64, Malaysian accountant and politician.
- Pol Bury, 83, Belgian sculptor.
- Enric Gensana, 69, Spanish football player.
- Constance Baker Motley, 84, American civil rights lawyer, congestive heart failure.
- Ihor Rybak, 70, Ukrainian weightlifter and Olympic champion (1956).
- Leo Sternbach, 97, Austrian-native chemist, known as the "Father of Valium".
- Boris Uspensky, 78, Soviet and Russian poster and graphics painter.

=== 29 ===
- Olga de Alaketu, 80, Benin-Brazilian Candomblé high priestess, complications of diabetes.
- Patrick Caulfield, 69, British artist.
- Benjamin DeMott, 81, American writer, scholar, and cultural critic, cardiac arrest, heart attack.
- Robert Dorgebray, 89, French cyclist and Olympic champion (1936).
- Yuri Sapega, 40, Belarusian volleyball player, coach, and Olympian (1988), heart attack.
- Gennadi Sarafanov, 63, Soviet Soyuz 15 cosmonaut.
- Mogens Schou, 86, Danish psychiatrist.
- Bruce Stewart, 80, New Zealand-British actor and scriptwriter.
- Ivar Karl Ugi, 75, German chemist.

=== 30 ===
- Monika Hellwig, 74, German-American theologian and Roman Catholic lay leader, cerebral hemorrhage.
- Renzo Nostini, 91, Italian fencer and Olympic multiple silver medalist (1948, 1952).
- Andrew P. O'Meara, 98, United States Army general, stroke.
- Sergey Starostin, 52, Soviet and Russian linguist, heart attack.
