= Torreggiani =

Torreggiani is a surname. Notable people with the surname include:

- Alfonso Torreggiani (1682–1764), Italian architect
- Antonio Cassar-Torreggiani (1882–1959), Maltese businessman
- Austin Cassar-Torreggiani (1915–?), Maltese sprinter
- Camillo Torreggiani (1820–1896), Italian sculptor
- Elzear Torreggiani (1830–1904), Italian Catholic bishop
- Luca Torreggiani (died 1699), Italian Catholic bishop
