= Wakayama =

Wakayama may refer to:

- Wakayama Prefecture, a prefecture of Japan
- Wakayama (city), the capital city of Wakayama Prefecture, Japan
- Wakayama Station, a train station in Wakayama, Wakayama
- Wakayama Domain, a Japanese feudal domain in Kii Province

== People with the surname ==
- Bokusui Wakayama (若山 牧水; 1885–1928), Japanese writer
- Genzō Wakayama (若山 弦蔵; 1932–2021), Japanese voice actor and actor
- Manami Wakayama (若山 愛美; born 1986), Japanese idol
- Shion Wakayama (若山 詩音; born 1998), Japanese voice actress
- Takimi Wakayama (若山 滝美; 1914–1941), Japanese water polo player
- Tomisaburo Wakayama (若山 富三郎; 1929–1992), Japanese actor
