= Trucco (surname) =

Trucco is an Italian surname. Notable people with the surname include:

- Alberto Batignani Trucco (born 1912), a Uruguayan water polo player.
- Carlos Trucco (born 1957), a Bolivian footballer.
- Manuel Trucco (born 1875), a Chilean politician.
- Michael Trucco (born 1970), an American actor.
- Vincenzo Trucco (born 1905), an Italian racing driver.
- Eduardo "Ed" Trucco (born 1963), an American actor.
