= Úlfarsson =

Úlfarsson is an Icelandic patronymic surname, which means son of Úlfar.

- Gaukur Úlfarsson (born 1973), Icelandic filmmaker and film director
- Thorleifur Úlfarsson (born 2000), Icelandic footballer
