= David McGregor =

David McGregor may refer to:

- David McGregor (water polo) (1909–?), British water polo player
- David Stuart McGregor (1895–1918), Scottish recipient of the Victoria Cross
- David McGregor Rogers (1772–1824), farmer and Member of the 2nd Parliament of Upper Canada

== See also ==
- David McGregore (1710–1777), member of colonial America Christian clergy
- David MacGregor (born 1981), Scottish footballer
- David MacGregor, Scottish musician better known as Broken Chanter
