= Gordon Black (swimmer) =

British swimmer

Personal information
- Nationality: British (Scottish)
- Born: c.1944 Scotland

Sport
- Sport: Swimming
- Event(s): Freestyle, Butterfly
- Club: Inverness Amateur Swimming Club

Gordon Black (born c.1944) is a former international swimmer from Scotland who competed at the Commonwealth Games.

== Biography ==
Black lived in Aberdeen but joined the Inverness Amateur Swimming Club in 1966. He specialised in the freestyle and butterfly strokes and won the 100 metres freestyle at the 1966 Scottish ASA trials.

Black represented the Scotland team at the 1966 British Empire and Commonwealth Games in Kingston, Jamaica, where he participated in four events. He reached the final of the 110 yards individual freestyle, finished fourth in the 4 x 100 metres freestye relay, with Downie Brown, Alex Galletly and Bobby McGregor and finished fifth in the 4 x 110 yards medley relay, with Casey Nelson, Eric Henderson and Bobby McGregor.

His brother Ian Black was also an international swimmer for Scotland and coached Gordon.

He emigrated to Canada and the France in 2004. He returned to Masters swimming at the age of 55 to assist with a collar bone inujury.
