= Vessaz =

Vessaz is a surname. Notable people with the surname include:

- Antoine Vessaz (1833–1911), Swiss politician
- Benjamin Vessaz, Swiss water polo player.
