= Josef Medřický =

Czech water polo player (1908–1992)

Personal information
- Nationality: Czech
- Born: 25 May 1908; Vyžlovka, Austria-Hungary
- Died: 27 October 1992; Prague, Czechoslovakia

Sport
- Sport: Water polo

Josef Medřický (25 May 1908 – 27 October 1992) was a Czech water polo player. He competed in the men's tournament at the 1936 Summer Olympics.
