= Hugo García =

Hugo García may refer to:

- Hugo García (water polo) (1914–?), Uruguayan water polo player
- Hugo García (Mexican footballer) (born 1981), Mexican football manager and former player
- Hugo Garcia (Australian footballer) (born 2005), Australian rules footballer
