= Chetcuti =

Chetcuti is a surname. Notable people with the surname include:

- Andrew Chetcuti (born 1992), Maltese swimmer
- Frans Chetcuti (born 1943), Maltese sports shooter
- Janice Chetcuti, Maltese politician
- Jeffrey Chetcuti (born 1974), Maltese professional footballer
- Jimmy Chetcuti (born 1913), Maltese water polo player
- Kayleigh Chetcuti (born 2000), Maltese footballer
- Mark Chetcuti (born 1958), Chief Justice of Malta
- William Chetcuti (born 1985), Maltese sport shooter
