= Joder =

Joder may refer to:

== Surname ==
- Kristina Joder
- René Joder
- Rudolf Joder

== Other ==
- Joder or Yoder, a Swiss form of the name Theodore
- Joder, Nebraska
