= Downie Brown =

British swimmer

Personal information
- Nationality: British (Scottish)
- Born: c.1944 Scotland

Sport
- Sport: Swimming
- Event: Freestyle
- Club: Arlington Baths Club, Glasgow

Downie Brown (born c.1944) is a former international swimmer from Scotland who competed at the Commonwealth Games.

== Biography ==
Brown studied at the University of Glasgow and represented their swimming team. After his studies he returned to swim for his Arlington Baths Club in Glasgow.

He specialised in the freestyle and was an accountant by profession.

Brown represented the Scotland team at the 1966 British Empire and Commonwealth Games in Kingston, Jamaica, where he participated in three events; the 100 and 440 yards freestyle and the and freestyle relay. He finished fourth in the 4 x 100 metres freestye relay, with Gordon Black, Alex Galletly and Bobby McGregor.

Downie's later swam for the Paisley Amateur Swimming Club and captained the Great Britain team. His last appearance for Scotland came in the 1971 Bologna Trophy.
