= Van Heteren =

Van Heteren is a surname. Notable people with the surname include:

- Adri van Heteren (born 1951), Dutch politician
- Jan van Heteren (1916–1992), Dutch water polo player
- Sanny van Heteren (born 1977), German actress
