= Bonačić =

Bonačić (pronounced [bɔ̌natʃitɕ]) – also occurring in the diaspora variant Bonacic – is a Croatian surname. Notable people with the surname include:

- Duje Bonačić (1929–2020), Croatian rower
- Filip Bonačić (191–1991), Croatian water polo player
- John Bonacic (born 1942), American politician
- Luka Bonačić (born 1955), Croatian football coach
- Mirko Bonačić (1903–1989), Croatian footballer
- Ozren Bonačić (born 1942), Croatian water polo player
