= Bob McGregor =

Scottish swimmer (born 1944)

Bob McGregor MBE
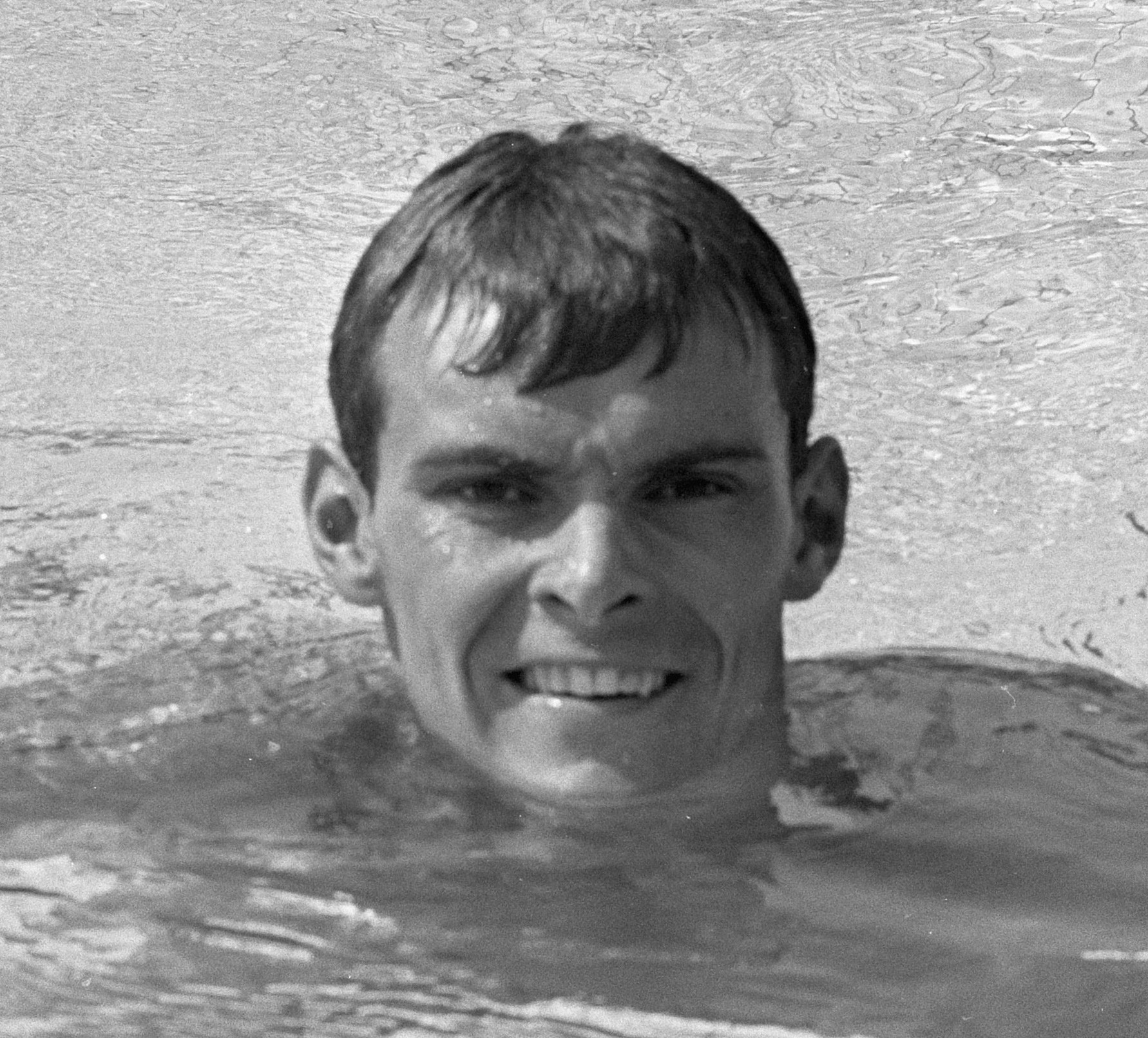
- McGregor in 1966

Personal information
- Full name: Robert Bilsand McGregor
- Nicknames: "Bob", "Bobby", "The Falkirk Flyer"
- Born: 3 April 1944 (age 82) Falkirk
- Height: 1.85 m (6 ft 1 in)
- Weight: 80 kg (176 lb; 12 st 8 lb)

Sport
- Sport: Swimming
- Strokes: Freestyle
- Club: Chinook Aquatic Club
Medal record
Men's swimming
Representing Great Britain
Olympic Games
Silver medal – second place	1964 Tokyo	100 m freestyle
European Championships
Gold medal – first place	1966 Utrecht	100 m freestyle
Silver medal – second place	1962 Leipzig	4×100 m freestyle
Universiade
Silver medal – second place	1967 Tokyo	100 m freestyle
Representing Scotland
British Empire and Commonwealth Games
Silver medal – second place	1966 Kingston	110 yd freestyle

Robert Bilsand McGregor, MBE (born 3 April 1944), nicknamed the "Falkirk Flyer", is a Scottish former competitive swimmer.

== Swimming career ==
He competed in eight events at the 1964 and 1968 Summer Olympics. He won a silver medal in the 100-metre freestyle in 1964, and finished fourth in the 100-metre freestyle and 4×100-metre freestyle relay in 1968. He was a second favourite for the 1963 BBC Sports Personality of the Year Award. In 2002 he was inducted into the Scottish Sports Hall of Fame. Olympic selectors could not believe that he trained in a 25-metre pool in Falkirk when the selectors arrived to critique him prior to the Tokyo Olympics.

McGregor competed at the 1962 British Empire and Commonwealth Games in Perth, Australia.

McGregor represented the Scotland team again at the 1966 British Empire and Commonwealth Games in Kingston, Jamaica, where he participated in three events. He won the silver medal in the 110 yards individual freestyle, finished fourth in the 4 x 100 metres freestye relay, with Downie Brown, Gordon Black and Alex Galletly and finished fifth in the 4 x 110 yards medley relay, with Casey Nelson, Eric Henderson and Gordon Black.

He is a six times winner of the British Championship in 100 metres freestyle (1962, 1963, 1964, 1967, 1968 and 1968). In the 1963 event he set a world record in the heats (54.4 sec) and the final (54.1 sec). He also won the 1963 200 metres freestyle.

== Personal life ==
He retired from swimming in 1968 and now works as an architect in Glasgow. He lives in Helensburgh with his wife and family. His father, David McGregor, was an Olympic water polo player.

== See also ==
- List of Commonwealth Games medallists in swimming (men)
- List of Olympic medalists in swimming (men)
