= Francisco Figueroa (water polo) =

Uruguayan water polo player (1906–2001)

Personal information
- Born: 21 July 1906 Montevideo, Uruguay
- Died: 5 May 2001 (aged 94)

Sport
- Sport: Water polo

Francisco Figueroa (21 July 1906 – 5 May 2001) was a Uruguayan water polo player. He competed in the men's tournament at the 1936 Summer Olympics.
