= Kosei Tano =

Japanese water polo player (born 1914)

Personal information
- Nationality: Japanese
- Born: 22 January 1914

Sport
- Sport: Water polo

Kosei Tano (田野耕晴, Tano Kōsei, born 22 January 1914, date of death unknown) was a Japanese water polo player. He competed in the men's tournament at the 1936 Summer Olympics.
