= Hans Maier (water polo) =

Dutch water polo player (1916–2018)

Personal information
- Born: 11 July 1916 Madiun, Dutch East Indies
- Died: 29 November 2018 (aged 102) The Hague, The Netherlands

Sport
- Sport: Water polo
Medal record
Representing Netherlands
European Championships
Bronze medal – third place	1938 London	Team competition

Hans Maier (11 July 1916 – 29 November 2018) was a Dutch water polo player who competed in the 1936 Summer Olympics. Born in Madioen, Dutch East Indies, he was part of the Dutch team which finished fifth in the 1936 tournament, playing in all seven matches. He died in November 2018 at the age of 102.

== Biography ==
Maier grew up in the Dutch East Indies and started his sports career as a swimmer. In the breaststroke, he used a different kick that allowed him to swim faster than many of his competitors. In June 1935, he broke the Dutch record in the 100 meter breaststroke by four seconds. The jury subsequently considered whether the record should be recognized. Because nowhere in the regulations did it say that the technique Maier used was not allowed, the record was recognized. Due to the discussion surrounding his swimming technique, Maier was not included in match selections for international tournaments.

In the winter of 1935–36, water polo coach Frans Kuyper saw Maier play in the third team of Het Y in Amsterdam. He noticed that Maier rose high above the water and was therefore good at intercepting balls. Maier then included Maier in the national selection that was preparing for the Games in Berlin. During the tournament, Maier played all seven matches. The team eventually finished in fifth place.

After his studies in economics, he started working as executive secretary at Van Gend & Loos in Utrecht. In 1946, he joined Shell and later became financial manager of the chemical branch of Shell.

Maier married in 1944 and had two daughters. In July 2016, De Volkskrant called him the very last living Dutch participant of the 1936 Summer Olympics in Berlin. Hans Maier died on 29 November 2018.
