= Peter Riedl =

Austrian water polo player

Personal information
- Nationality: Austrian
- Born: 15 August 1910
- Died: 27 September 1992 (aged 82)

Sport
- Sport: Water polo

Peter Riedl (15 August 1910 – 27 September 1992) was an Austrian water polo player. He competed in the men's tournament at the 1936 Summer Olympics.
