= Fernand Isselé =

Belgian water polo player

Personal information
- Born: February 22, 1915 Bruges, Belgium
- Died: May 5, 1994 (aged 79)

Sport
- Sport: Water polo
Medal record
Representing Belgium
Olympic Games
Bronze medal – third place	1936 Berlin	Team competition

Fernand Isselé (22 February 1915 – May 1994) was a Belgian water polo player who competed in the 1936 Summer Olympics and in the 1948 Summer Olympics.

In 1936 he was part of the Belgian team which won the bronze medal. He played all seven matches.

Twelve years later at the 1948 Summer Olympics he was a member of the Belgian team which finished fourth in the 1948 tournament. He also played all seven matches.

== See also ==
- List of Olympic medalists in water polo (men)
