= Heinz Meier (water polo) =

Swiss water polo player

Personal information
- Nationality: Swiss
- Born: 21 July 1912

Sport
- Sport: Water polo

Heinz Meier (born 21 July 1912, date of death unknown) was a Swiss water polo player. He competed in the men's tournament at the 1936 Summer Olympics.
