= Paul Klingenburg =

German water polo player

Personal information
- Born: 19 October 1907 Duisburg, German Empire
- Died: 10 September 1964 (aged 56) Assmannshausen, West Germany

Sport
- Sport: Water polo
Medal record
Representing Germany
Olympic Games
| Silver medal – second place | 1936 Berlin | Team competition |

Paul Klingenburg (19 October 1907 – 10 September 1964) was a German water polo player who competed in the 1936 Summer Olympics.

He was part of the German team which won the silver medal. He played six matches including the final.

== See also ==
- Germany men's Olympic water polo team records and statistics
- List of Olympic medalists in water polo (men)
- List of men's Olympic water polo tournament goalkeepers
