= Otto Müller (water polo) =

Austrian water polo player

Personal information
- Nationality: Austrian
- Born: 10 May 1910
- Died: 30 August 1965 (aged 55)

Sport
- Sport: Water polo

Otto Müller (10 May 1910 – 30 August 1965) was an Austrian water polo player. He competed in the men's tournament at the 1936 Summer Olympics.
