= Bertil Berg =

Swedish water polo player

Personal information
- Born: 19 December 1910
- Died: 25 January 1989 (aged 78)

Sport
- Sport: Water polo

Bertil Berg (19 December 1910 - 25 January 1989) was a Swedish water polo player who competed in the 1936 Summer Olympics. In 1936 he was part of the Swedish team which finished seventh in the water polo tournament. He played all seven matches.
