= Franz Wenninger =

Austrian water polo player (1910–1996)

Personal information
- Nationality: Austrian
- Born: 20 October 1910; Vienna
- Died: 1 August 1996; Vienna

Sport
- Sport: Water polo

Franz Wenninger (20 October 1910 – 1 August 1996) was an Austrian water polo player. He competed in the men's tournament at the 1936 Summer Olympics in Berlin, coming in sixth place.
