= Eric Henderson (swimmer) =

British swimmer

Personal information
- Nationality: British (Scottish)
- Born: 1948 Scotland

Sport
- Sport: Swimming
- Event: Butterfly
- Club: Paisley SC; Warrender Baths Club

Eric Henderson (born 1948) is a former international swimmer from Scotland who competed at the Commonwealth Games.

== Biography ==
Henderson was a member of the Paisley Swimming Club and won the 1964 Scottish 220 yards butterfly title. Henderson specialised in the butterfly and made his British international debut in 1965 at the age of 17. In 1965 and 1966, he won six national titles over butterfly and medley.

Henderson represented the Scotland team at the 1966 British Empire and Commonwealth Games in Kingston, Jamaica, where he participated in three events. He finished fifth in the 4 x 110 yards medley relay, with Casey Nelson, Gordon Black and Bobby McGregor.

He later swam for the Warrender Baths Club and attended a second Commonwealth Games at the 1970 British Commonwealth Games in Edinburgh and after his active swimming career, he went on to became coach of the British swimming team.

In 1997, he received £27,500 compensation after being wrongfully dismissed from his sports development officer role by Bristol City Council.
