= Jean Gysel =

Swiss water polo player

Personal information
- Nationality: Swiss
- Born: 17 December 1910

Sport
- Sport: Water polo

Jean Gysel (born 17 December 1910, date of death unknown) was a Swiss water polo player. He competed in the men's tournament at the 1936 Summer Olympics.
