= Maximino García =

Uruguayan water polo player

Personal information
- Born: 22 July 1915; Montevideo, Uruguay

Sport
- Sport: Water polo

Maximino García (born 22 July 1915, date of death unknown) was a Uruguayan water polo player. He competed in the men's tournament at the 1936 Summer Olympics.
