= Fritz Stolze =

German water polo player

Personal information
- Born: December 20, 1910 Hanover, German Empire
- Died: March 6, 1972 (aged 61) Hanover, West Germany

Sport
- Sport: Water polo
Medal record
Representing Germany
Olympic Games
Silver medal – second place	1936 Berlin	Team competition

Fritz Stolze (20 December 1910 – 6 March 1972) was a German water polo player who competed in the 1936 Summer Olympics. He was part of the German team that won the silver medal. He played one match as goalkeeper.

== See also ==
- Germany men's Olympic water polo team records and statistics
- List of Olympic medalists in water polo (men)
- List of men's Olympic water polo tournament goalkeepers
