= Magnús Pálsson =

Icelandic water polo player (1912–1990)

Personal information
- Nationality: Icelandic
- Born: 19 November 1912; Reykjavík, Iceland
- Died: 6 August 1990 (aged 77); Reykjavík, Iceland

Sport
- Sport: Water polo

Magnús Pálsson (19 November 1912 – 6 August 1990) was an Icelandic water polo player. He competed in the men's tournament at the 1936 Summer Olympics.
