= Karl Seitz (water polo) =

Austrian water polo player

Personal information
- Nationality: Austrian
- Born: 23 May 1904
- Died: 5 December 1990 (aged 86)

Sport
- Sport: Water polo

Karl Seitz (23 May 1904 – 5 December 1990) was an Austrian water polo player. He competed in the men's tournament at the 1936 Summer Olympics.
