= Karl Steinbach =

Austrian water polo player (1909–1983)

Personal information
- Nationality: Austrian
- Born: 27 December 1909
- Died: March 1983 (aged 83)

Sport
- Sport: Water polo

Karl Steinbach (27 December 1909 – March 1983) was an Austrian water polo player. He competed in the men's tournament at the 1936 Summer Olympics.
