= Ferdinand Denzler =

Swiss water polo player

Personal information
- Nationality: Swiss
- Born: 16 November 1909 Leoben, Austria
- Died: 3 July 1991 (aged 81) La Croix-Valmer, France

Sport
- Sport: Water polo

Ferdinand Denzler (16 November 1909 – 3 July 1991) was a Swiss water polo player. He competed in the men's tournament at the 1936 Summer Olympics. He went on to be a sculptor, and competed in the arts competition at the 1948 Summer Olympics.
