= Henri De Pauw =

Belgian water polo player

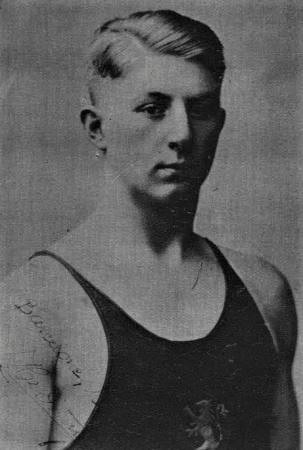

Personal information
- Born: 26 February 1911 Ghent, Belgium
- Died: 6 June 1973 (aged 62) Ostend, Belgium

Sport
- Sport: Water polo
Medal record
Representing Belgium
Olympic Games
Bronze medal – third place	1936 Berlin	Team competition

Henri De Pauw (26 February 1911 – 6 June 1973) was a Belgian water polo player who competed in the 1928 Summer Olympics, in the 1936 Summer Olympics, and in the 1948 Summer Olympics. In 1928 he was a member of the Belgian team in the 1928 tournament. He played one match and scored three goals. Eight years later he won the bronze medal with the Belgian team. He played three matches. In 1948 he was part of the Belgian team which finished fourth in the Olympic tournament.

== See also ==
- List of Olympic medalists in water polo (men)
