= Shigetaka Katsuhisa =

Japanese water polo player

Personal information
- Nationality: Japanese
- Born: 4 September 1911

Sport
- Sport: Water polo

Shigetaka Katsuhisa (勝久重隆, Katsuhisa Shigetaka; born 4 September 1911, date of death unknown) was a Japanese water polo player. He competed in the men's tournament at the 1936 Summer Olympics.
