= Lex Franken =

Dutch water polo player (1916–1990)

Personal information
- Born: 1 April 1916; Utrecht, Netherlands
- Died: 6 November 1990 (aged 74); Krefeld, Germany

Sport
- Sport: Water polo

Alexander "Lex" Franken (1 April 1916 – 6 November 1990) was a Dutch water polo player who competed in the 1936 Summer Olympics. Born in Utrecht, he was part of the Dutch team which finished fifth in the 1936 tournament. He played all seven matches.
