= Sebastian Ploner =

Austrian water polo player (1907–1981)

Personal information
- Nationality: Austrian
- Born: 27 May 1907; Vienna
- Died: December 1981

Sport
- Sport: Water polo

Sebastian Ploner (27 May 1907 – December 1981) was an Austrian water polo player. He competed in the men's tournament at the 1936 Summer Olympics.
