= Koichi Wada =

Japanese water polo player

Personal information
- Nationality: Japanese
- Born: 25 July 1916

Sport
- Sport: Water polo

Koichi Wada (和田幸一, Wada Kōichi, born 25 July 1916, date of death unknown) was a Japanese water polo player. He competed in the men's tournament at the 1936 Summer Olympics.
