= Josef Hauser (water polo) =

German water polo player

Personal information
- Born: March 10, 1910 Munich, German Empire
- Died: August 10, 1981 (aged 71) Munich, West Germany

Sport
- Sport: Water polo
Medal record
Men's Water Polo
Representing Germany
Olympic Games
Silver medal – second place	1936 Berlin	Team competition
European Championships
Silver medal – second place	1938 London	Team

Josef Hauser (10 March 1910 – 10 August 1981) was a German water polo player who competed in the 1936 Summer Olympics.

He was part of the German team which won the silver medal. He played all seven matches.

== See also ==
- List of Olympic medalists in water polo (men)
