= Pierre Coppieters =

Belgian water polo player

Personal information
- Born: May 24, 1907 Ostend, Belgium
- Died: 20 April 1980 (aged 72)

Sport
- Sport: Swimming
Medal record
Representing Belgium
Men's Water polo
Olympic Games
Bronze medal – third place	1936 Berlin	Team competition

Pierre Coppieters (24 May 1907 – 20 April 1980) was a Belgian swimmer and water polo player who competed in the 1928 and 1936 Summer Olympics.

== See also ==
- List of Olympic medalists in water polo (men)
