= Erwin Blasl =

Austrian water polo player (1911–1998)

Personal information
- Nationality: Austrian
- Born: 27 December 1911
- Died: 8 January 1998 (aged 86)

Sport
- Sport: Water polo

Erwin Blasl (27 December 1911 – 8 January 1998) was an Austrian water polo player that competed in the men's tournament at the 1936 Summer Olympics.
