= Casey Nelson (swimmer) =

British swimmer

Personal information
- Nationality: British (Scottish)
- Born: c.1947 Scotland

Sport
- Sport: Swimming
- Event: Backstroke
- Club: Falkirk Otter SC

Casey Nelson (born c.1947) is a former international swimmer from Scotland who competed at the Commonwealth Games.

== Biography ==
Nelson was a member of the Falkirk Otter Swimming Club. and in September 1964 broke Jack Wardrop's 100 yards backstroke Scottish record with a time of 57.6sec, which had stood since 1954.

Nelson specialised in the backstroke and by 1965 had established himself as the leading Scottish swimmer in the discipline.

Nelson represented the Scotland team at the 1966 British Empire and Commonwealth Games in Kingston, Jamaica, where he participated in three events. He finished fifth in the 4 x 110 yards medley relay, with Eric Henderson, Gordon Black and Bobby McGregor.

He married fellow swimmer Jill Chapman in 1967.
