= Lešek Boubela =

Czech water polo player (1910–1989)

Personal information
- Nationality: Czech
- Born: 7 January 1910; Bolzano, Austria-Hungary
- Died: 18 October 1989 (aged 79); Potts Point, Australia

Sport
- Sport: Water polo

Lešek Boubela (7 January 1910 – 18 October 1989) was a Czech water polo player. He competed in the men's tournament at the 1936 Summer Olympics.
