= Konstantin Koutek =

Czech water polo player

Personal information
- Nationality: Czech
- Born: 25 October 1909

Sport
- Sport: Water polo

Konstantin Koutek (born 25 October 1909, date of death unknown) was a Czech water polo player. He competed in the men's tournament at the 1936 Summer Olympics.
