= Karel Schmuck =

Czech water polo player

Personal information
- Nationality: Czech
- Born: 29 December 1913

Sport
- Sport: Water polo

Achievements and titles
- Olympic finals: 1936 Summer Olympics

Karel Schmuck (born 29 December 1913, date of death unknown) was a Czech water polo player. He competed in the men's tournament at the 1936 Summer Olympics.
