= Þórður Guðmundsson =

Icelandic water polo player (1908–1988)

Personal information
- Nationality: Icelandic
- Born: 19 May 1908; Reykjavík, Iceland
- Died: 19 October 1988 (aged 80); Reykjavík, Iceland

Sport
- Sport: Water polo

Þórður Guðmundsson (19 May 1908 – 19 October 1988) was an Icelandic water polo player. He competed in the men's tournament at the 1936 Summer Olympics.
