= Torajiro Kataoka =

Japanese water polo player

Personal information
- Nationality: Japanese
- Born: 7 February 1915

Sport
- Sport: Water polo

Torajiro Kataoka (片岡寅次郎, Kataoka Torajirō; born 7 February 1915) was a Japanese water polo player. He competed in the men's tournament at the 1936 Summer Olympics.
