= Henri Disy =

Belgian water polo player

Personal information
- Born: September 6, 1913
- Died: September 8, 1989 (aged 76)

Sport
- Sport: Water polo
Medal record
Representing Belgium
Olympic Games
Bronze medal – third place	1936 Berlin	Team competition

Henri Disy (6 September 1913 – 8 September 1989) was a Belgian water polo player who competed in the 1936 Summer Olympics.

He was part of the Belgian team which won the bronze medal. He played all seven matches as goalkeeper.

== See also ==
- Belgium men's Olympic water polo team records and statistics
- List of Olympic medalists in water polo (men)
- List of men's Olympic water polo tournament goalkeepers
