= Roger Van de Casteele =

French water polo player

Personal information
- Born: 12 July 1913; Tourcoing, France

Sport
- Sport: Water polo

Roger Van de Casteele (born 12 July 1913 in Tourcoing, died 9 June 2002 in Monaco) was a French water polo player who competed in the 1936 Summer Olympics. He was part of the French team which finished fourth in the 1936 tournament. He played all seven matches.
