= Jón Ingi Guðmundsson =

Icelandic water polo player (1909–1989)

Personal information
- Nationality: Icelandic
- Born: 16 September 1909; Patreksfjörður, Iceland
- Died: 5 May 1989 (aged 79); Reykjavík, Iceland

Sport
- Sport: Water polo

Jón Ingi Guðmundsson (16 September 1909 – 5 May 1989) was an Icelandic water polo player. He competed in the men's tournament at the 1936 Summer Olympics.
