= Soesoe van Oostrom Soede =

Dutch water polo player (1911–1939)

Personal information
- Born: 25 October 1911; Groede, Netherlands
- Died: 18 December 1939 (aged 28); Wassenaar, Netherlands

Sport
- Sport: Water polo

Jean Marie Henri (Soesoe) van Oostrom Soede (25 October 1911 – 18 December 1939) was a Dutch water polo player who competed in the 1936 Summer Olympics.

He was part of the Dutch team which finished fifth in the 1936 tournament. He played all seven matches.
