= Gé Regter =

Dutch water polo player (1916–1987)

Personal information
- Born: 6 March 1916; Rotterdam, Netherlands
- Died: 4 August 1987 (aged 71); The Hague, Netherlands

Sport
- Sport: Water polo

Gerardus "Gé" Regter (6 March 1916 – 4 August 1987) was a Dutch water polo player who competed in the 1936 Summer Olympics. He was part of the Dutch team which finished fifth in the 1936 tournament. He played all seven matches.
