= Gustav Schürger =

German water polo player

Personal information
- Born: 4 January 1908 Nuremberg, German Empire
- Died: 10 June 1969 (aged 61) Nuremberg, West Germany

Sport
- Sport: Water polo
Medal record
Representing Germany
Olympic Games
Silver medal – second place	1936 Berlin	Team competition

Gustav Schürger (4 January 1908 – 10 June 1969) was a German water polo player who competed in the 1936 Summer Olympics.

He was part of the German team which won the silver medal. He played six matches including the final.

== See also ==
- List of Olympic medalists in water polo (men)
