= Bernhard Baier =

German water polo player

Personal information
- Born: August 12, 1912 Hanover, German Empire
- Died: April 26, 2003 (aged 90) Hanover, Germany

Sport
- Sport: Water polo
Medal record
Men's Water Polo
Representing Germany
Olympic Games
Silver medal – second place	1936 Berlin	Team competition
European Championships
Silver medal – second place	1938 London	Team

Bernhard Baier (12 August 1912 – 26 April 2003) was a German water polo player who competed in the 1936 Summer Olympics.

He was part of the German team which won the silver medal. He played six matches including the final.

== See also ==
- List of Olympic medalists in water polo (men)
