= Alfred Lergetporer =

Austrian water polo player

Personal information
- Nationality: Austrian
- Born: 7 July 1909
- Died: 10 April 1970 (aged 60)

Sport
- Sport: Water polo

Alfred Lergetporer (7 July 1909 – 10 April 1970) was an Austrian water polo player. He competed in the men's tournament at the 1936 Summer Olympics.
