= Ernest Blake (water polo) =

British water polo player

Personal information
- Nationality: British
- Born: 31 March 1912; Kingston upon Hull
- Died: December 2002; Goole, East Riding of Yorkshire

Sport
- Sport: Water polo

Achievements and titles
- Olympic finals: 1 (1936)
- Updated on 18 February 2014

Ernest Blake (31 March 1912 – December 2002) was a British water polo player who competed in the 1936 Summer Olympics. He was part of the British team which finished eighth in the 1936 tournament. He played once, in Great Britain's 4–4 draw with the Netherlands.
