= Heinrich Krug =

German water polo player

Personal information
- Born: 22 September 1911 Berlin, German Empire

Sport
- Sport: Water polo
Medal record
Representing Germany
Olympic Games
Silver medal – second place	1936 Berlin	Team competition

Heinrich Krug (born 22 September 1911; date of death unknown) was a German water polo player who competed in the 1936 Summer Olympics.

He was part of the German team which won the silver medal. He played one match.

== See also ==
- List of Olympic medalists in water polo (men)
