= Stefán Jónsson (water polo) =

Icelandic water polo player (1918–2011)

Personal information
- Nationality: Icelandic
- Born: 19 January 1918 5 April 2011 (aged 93)

Sport
- Sport: Water polo

Stefán Jónsson (19 January 1918 – 5 April 2011) was an Icelandic water polo player. He competed in the men's tournament at the 1936 Summer Olympics.
