= André Busch =

French water polo player (1913–1991)

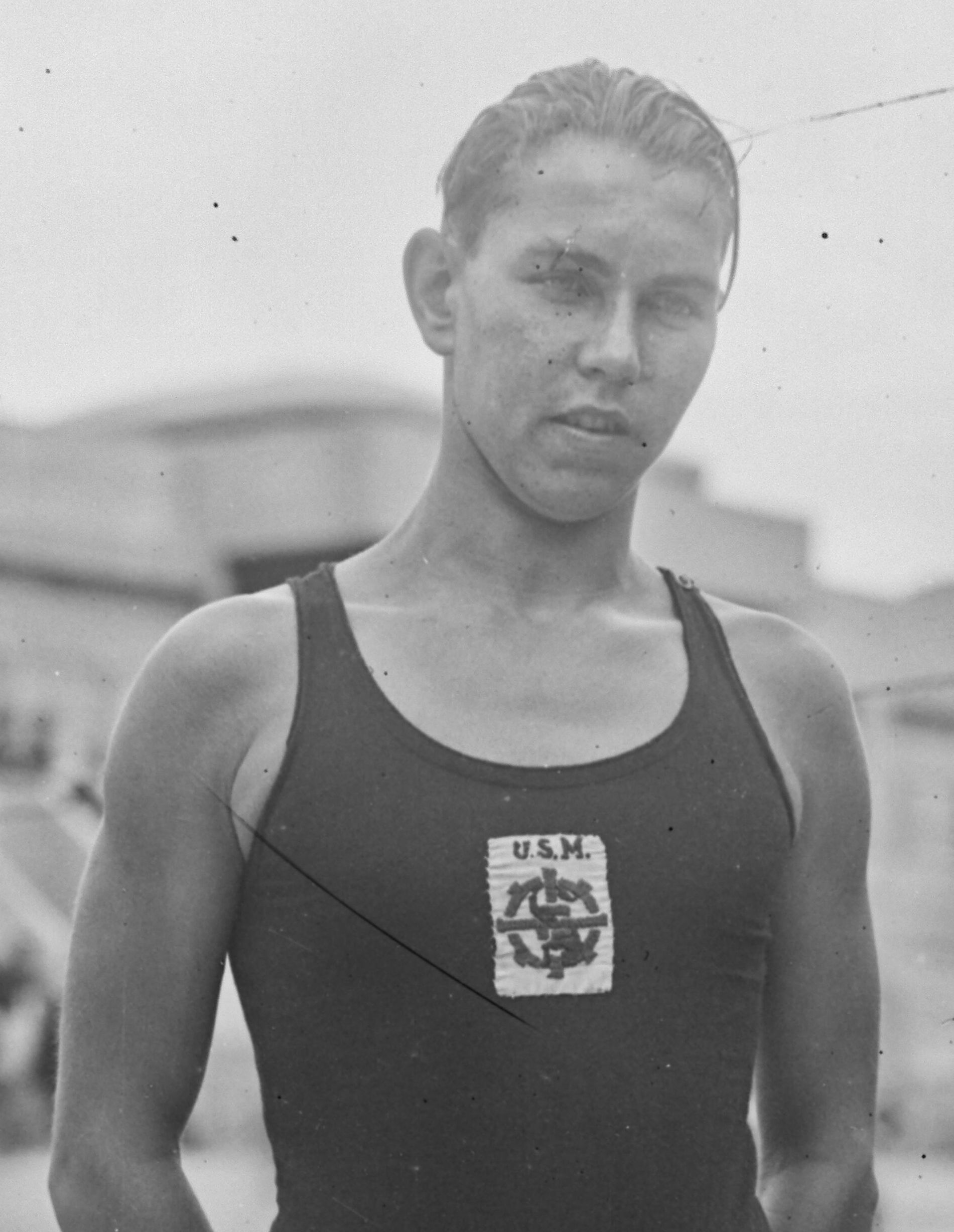
- André Busch in 1929

Personal information
- Nationality: France
- Born: 14 March 1913
- Died: 7 July 1991 (aged 78)

Sport
- Sport: Water polo

Senior clubs
- Years: Team
- –: FC Lyon
- –: Cercle des Nageurs de Lyon
National team
- Years: Team
- –: France

André Busch (14 March 1913 – 7 July 1991) was a French male water polo player. He was a member of the France men's national water polo team. He competed with the team at the 1936 Summer Olympics finishing in fourth place. On club level he played for FC Lyon (then, Cercle des Nageurs de Lyon).
