= David Grogan =

British water polo player

Personal information
- Born: 7 July 1914; Ashton-under-Lyne, Great Britain
- Died: 1 March 1993 (aged 78)

Sport
- Sport: Water polo

David Grogan (7 July 1914 – 1 March 1993) was a British water polo player who competed in the 1936 Summer Olympics.

He was part of the British team which finished eighth in the 1936 tournament. He played five matches.
