= István Molnár (water polo) =

Hungarian water polo player

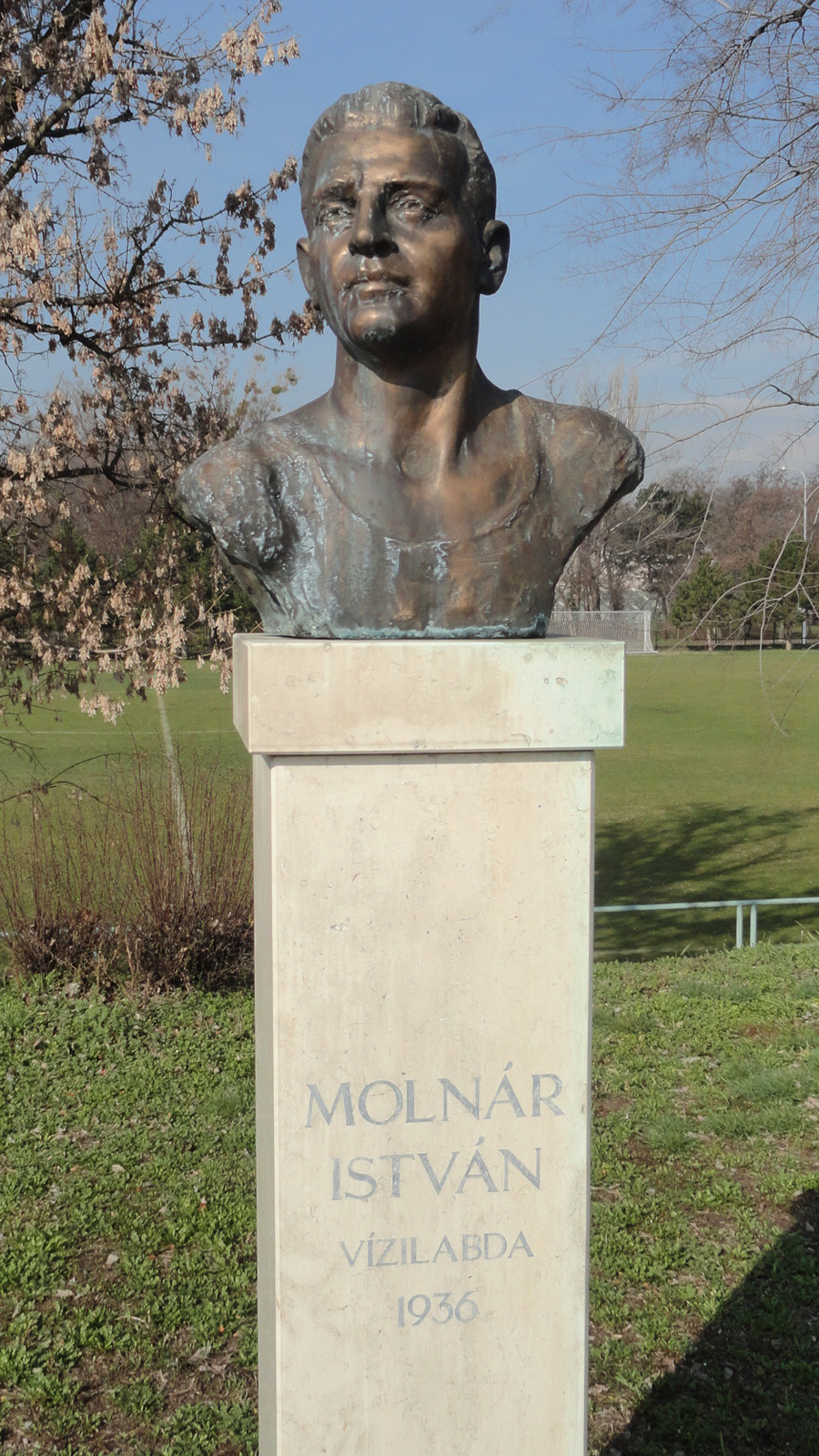

Personal information
- Born: January 5, 1913 Galanta, Austria-Hungary
- Died: July 1, 1983 (aged 70) Budapest, Hungary

Sport
- Sport: Water polo
Medal record
Representing Hungary
Olympic Games
Gold medal – first place	1936 Berlin	Team competition

István Molnár (January 5, 1913 – July 1, 1983) was a Hungarian water polo player who competed in the 1936 Summer Olympics.

He was part of the Hungarian team which won the gold medal. He played one match.

== See also ==
- Hungary men's Olympic water polo team records and statistics
- List of Olympic champions in men's water polo
- List of Olympic medalists in water polo (men)
