= Þorsteinn Hjálmarsson =

Icelandic water polo player (1911–1984)

Personal information
- Nationality: Icelandic
- Born: 20 September 1911
- Died: 10 December 1984 (aged 73)

Sport
- Sport: Water polo

Þorsteinn Hjálmarsson (20 September 1911 – 10 December 1984) was an Icelandic water polo player. He competed in the men's tournament at the 1936 Summer Olympics.
