= Kees van Aelst =

Dutch water polo player (1916–2000)

Personal information
- Born: 28 September 1916 The Hague, Netherlands
- Died: 6 September 2000 (aged 83) Utrecht, Netherlands

Sport
- Sport: Water polo
Medal record
Representing Netherlands
European Championships
Bronze medal – third place	1938 London	Team competition

Cornelis Gijsbertus "Kees" van Aelst (28 September 1916 – 6 September 2000) was a Dutch water polo player who competed in the 1936 Summer Olympics. He was part of the Dutch team which finished fifth in the 1936 tournament. He played all seven matches.
