= Vinko Cvjetković =

Croatian water polo player

Personal information
- Nationality: Croatian
- Born: 12 February 1911 Dubrovnik, Austria-Hungary
- Died: 9 September 1983 (aged 72) Dubrovnik, Yugoslavia

Sport
- Sport: Water polo

Vinko Cvjetković (12 February 1911 – 9 September 1983) was a Croatian water polo player. He established a prominent career as a water polo player during the 1930s as a key member of VK Jug, the most successful and decorated water polo club in Yugoslavia. As a standout athlete and a member of the national team, he competed in two European Water Polo Championships (Magdeburg 1934 and London 1938) and participated in the 1936 Summer Olympics men's tournament at the 1936 Summer Olympics in Berlin

Following his athletic career, he dedicated himself to pedagogy and coaching. After completing his initial studies at a teacher training college (preparandija), he furthered his academic education with a degree from the Faculty of Physical Culture of the University of Dubrovnik. His professional background enabled him to work as a high school professor and a swimming and water polo coach, contributing significantly to the development of the sport, not only in his hometown of Dubrovnik, but throughout the region.

He later moved to Greece, first coaching the swimming and water polo teams of the "Nautical Club of Patras" (Ν.Ο.Π.) and then, for ten years, the swimming and water polo divisions of Panathinaikos A.O., winning several national championships in the '60s. He closed his Greek stay as the swimming and water polo coach of the "Nautical Club of Volos" (Ν.Ο.B.) and moved home to Dubrovnik, where he coached the local "Bellevue" swimming team.
