= Ru den Hamer =

Dutch water polo player (1917–1988)

Personal information
- Born: 24 July 1917 Buitenzorg, Dutch East Indies
- Died: 14 March 1988 (aged 70) The Hague, Netherlands

Sport
- Sport: Water polo
Medal record
Representing Netherlands
European Championships
Bronze medal – third place	1938 London	Team competition

Rudolf den Hamer (24 July 1917 – 14 March 1988) was a Dutch water polo player who competed in the 1936 Summer Olympics. He was part of the Dutch team which finished fifth in the 1936 tournament. He played four matches.
