= Jón Jónsson (water polo) =

Icelandic water polo player (1908–1973)

Personal information
- Full name: Jón Dagbjartur Jónsson
- Nationality: Icelandic
- Born: 11 April 1908; Arnarfjörður, Kingdom of Iceland
- Died: 2 August 1973 (aged 65); Reykjavík, Iceland
- Spouse: Svava Sigurðardóttir (m. 1941)

Sport
- Country: Iceland
- Sport: Swimming; Water polo
- Club: Ægir

Jón Dagbjartur Jónsson (11 April 1908 - 2 August 1973) was an Icelandic water polo player and competition swimmer. He competed in the men's water polo tournament at the 1936 Summer Olympics.

== Early life ==
Jón was born in Arnarfjörður in the Kingdom of Iceland on 11 April 1908.

== Sports ==
Alongside playing Water polo, Jón was a competition swimmer in Iceland where he set several national records during the 1930s.

== Death ==
On 2 August 1973, Jón fell from a roof he was painting. He was transported to a hospital where he died shortly later from his injuries.
