= Kálmán Hazai =

Hungarian water polo player

Personal information
- Born: 17 July 1913 Marosvásárhely, Hungary
- Died: 21 December 1996 (aged 83) Copenhagen, Denmark

Sport
- Sport: Water polo
Medal record
Representing Hungary
Olympic Games
Gold medal – first place	1936 Berlin	Team competition

Kálmán Hazai (17 July 1913 – 21 December 1996) was a Hungarian water polo player who competed in the 1936 Summer Olympics. He was born in Marosvásárhely.

He was part of the Hungarian team which won the gold medal. He played five matches including the final. He died in Copenhagen, Denmark.

== See also ==
- Hungary men's Olympic water polo team records and statistics
- List of Olympic champions in men's water polo
- List of Olympic medalists in water polo (men)
