= Hugo Vondřejc =

Czech water polo player (1910–1979)

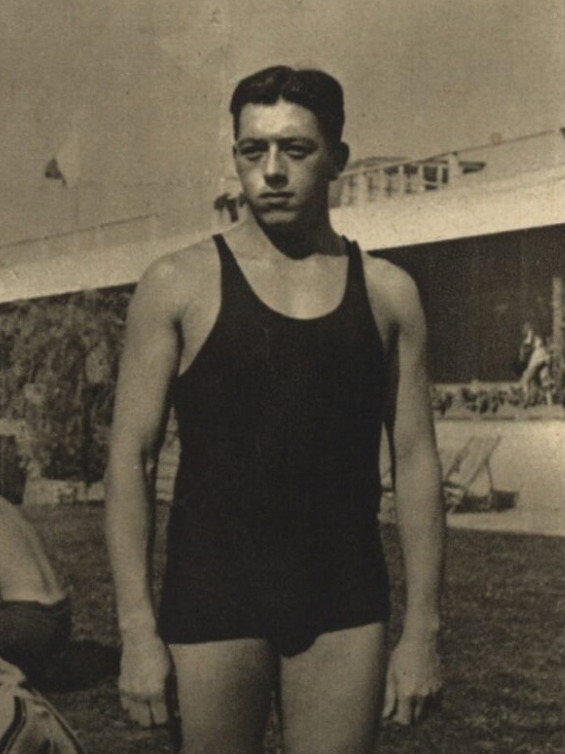

Personal information
- Nationality: Czech
- Born: 12 August 1910
- Died: 15 November 1979 (aged 69)

Sport
- Sport: Water polo

Hugo Vondřejc (12 August 1910 – 15 November 1979) was a Czech water polo player. He competed in the men's tournament at the 1936 Summer Olympics.
