= Úlfar =

Úlfar is an Icelandic male given name. A mountain Úlfarsfell and river Úlfarsá in Mosfellsbær are named after a settler 'Úlfar'. People bearing the name Úlfar include:

- Úlfar Þórðarson
