= Alfred Kienzle =

German water polo player

Personal information
- Born: 1 May 1913 Stuttgart, German Empire
- Died: 4 September 1940 (aged 27) Reims, France

Sport
- Sport: Water polo
Medal record
Men's Water Polo
Representing Germany
Olympic Games
Silver medal – second place	1936 Berlin	Team competition
European Championships
Silver medal – second place	1938 London	Team

Alfred Kienzle (1 May 1913 – 4 September 1940) was a German water polo player who competed in the 1936 Summer Olympics. He was part of the German team which won the silver medal. He played one match.

He was killed in action during World War II.

== See also ==
- List of Olympic medalists in water polo (men)
