= Henri Stoelen =

Belgian water polo player

Personal information
- Born: 2 September 1906 Brussels, Belgium
- Died: 1977 (aged 70–71) Brussels, Belgium

Sport
- Sport: Water polo
Medal record
Representing Belgium
Olympic Games
Bronze medal – third place	1936 Berlin	Team competition

Henri Stoelen (2 September 1906 – 1977) was a Belgian water polo player who competed in the 1936 Summer Olympics.

He was part of the Belgian team which won the bronze medal. He played all seven matches.

== See also ==
- List of Olympic medalists in water polo (men)
