= William Martin (water polo) =

British water polo player

Personal information
- Born: 20 December 1906; Bournville, Great Britain
- Died: 1980 (aged 73–74)

Sport
- Sport: Water polo

William "Bill" Martin (20 December 1906 – 1980) was a British water polo player who competed in the 1936 Summer Olympics.

== Career ==
He was part of the British team which finished eighth in the 1936 tournament. He played all seven matches.
