= Mirko Tarana =

Croatian water polo player

Personal information
- Nationality: Croatian
- Born: 22 September 1913; Dubrovnik, Austria-Hungary
- Died: May 1945; Bleiburg, Austria

Sport
- Sport: Water polo

Mirko Tarana (22 September 1913 – May 1945) was a Croatian water polo player. He competed in the men's tournament at the 1936 Summer Olympics.
