= Wilhelm Hawlik =

Austrian water polo player

Personal information
- Nationality: Austrian
- Born: 19 July 1909
- Died: 20 October 1944 (aged 35)

Sport
- Sport: Water polo

Wilhelm Hawlik (19 July 1909 – 20 October 1944) was an Austrian water polo player. He competed in the men's tournament at the 1936 Summer Olympics.
