= Helmuth Schwenn =

German water polo player

Personal information
- Born: January 27, 1913 Hanover, German Empire
- Died: July 16, 1983 (aged 70) Hanover, West Germany

Sport
- Sport: Water polo
Medal record
Representing Germany
Olympic Games
Silver medal – second place	1936 Berlin	Team competition

Helmuth Schwenn (27 January 1913 – 16 July 1983) was a German water polo player who competed in the 1936 Summer Olympics.

== Career ==
Schwenningen won an Olympic silver medal in water polo in the Olympics in 1936 in Berlin. He was part of the German team that finished second in water polo tournament. There were 16 nations that fielded teams. Germany's performance in the final round, 2-2 against Hungary, 4-1 against Belgium and 8-1 over France . Hungary and Germany both had five points but Hungary won due to better target view (10/2 = 5) against Germany (14/4 = 3.5). The other players on the German team was Fritz Gunst, Josef Hauser, Alfred Kienzle, Paul Klingenburg, Heinrich Krug, Hans Schneider, Hans Schulze, Gustav Schürger and Fritz Stolze. Schwenningen played two matches during water polo tournament in Berlin.

== See also ==
- List of Olympic medalists in water polo (men)
