= Hugo García (water polo) =

Uruguayan water polo player

Personal information
- Born: 20 March 1914; Montevideo, Uruguay

Sport
- Sport: Water polo

Hugo García (born 20 March 1914, date of death unknown) was a Uruguayan water polo player. He competed in the men's tournament at the 1936 Summer Olympics.
