= Clive Johnston =

Australian cricketer

Personal information
- Full name: Clive William Johnston
- Born: 4 August 1925; Sydney, Australia
- Died: 12 May 1991 (aged 65); Sydney, Australia
- Batting: Right-handed

Domestic team information
- Years: Team
- 1949-50 to 1957-58: New South Wales
- Source: ESPNcricinfo, 1 January 2017

Clive Johnston (4 August 1925 – 12 May 1991) was an Australian cricketer. He played eleven first-class matches for New South Wales between 1949/50 and 1957/58.

== See also ==
- List of New South Wales representative cricketers

== Trivia ==
Clive Johnston is the grandfather of Luke Brooks who plays for the Wests Tigers in National Rugby League
