= Aleksander Niezabitowski =

Polish footballer

Personal information
- Full name: Aleksander Józef Niezabitowski
- Date of birth: 17 September 1908
- Place of birth: Kraków, Galicia
- Date of death: 12 May 1991 (aged 82)
- Place of death: Katowice, Poland
- Height: 1.78 m (5 ft 10 in)
- Position: Midfielder

Senior career*
Years	Team	Apps	(Gls)
1922–1927	Podgórze Kraków		
1927–1935	Cracovia		

International career
1930–1934	Poland	13	(0)
- * Club domestic league appearances and goals

Aleksander Józef Niezabitowski (née Mysiak, 17 September 1908 – 12 May 1991) was a Polish footballer who played as a midfielder. In the late 1920s and early 1930s, he represented both Cracovia and the Poland national team.

With Cracovia, he won the Polish championship twice, in 1930 and 1932, altogether playing in 230 games. As a member of the national team, Mysiak was fielded in 13 official international matches. He retired from football unexpectedly at the age of 26, reportedly due to his wife's dislike of football.

== Honours ==
Cracovia

- Ekstraklasa: 1930, 1932
