= Jack Frendo Azzopardi =

Maltese water polo player

Personal information
- Full name: John Frendo Azzopardi
- Nationality: Maltese
- Born: 23 October 1915
- Died: 13 October 1998 (aged 82)

Sport
- Sport: Water polo

Jack Frendo Azzopardi (23 October 1915 – 13 October 1998) was a Maltese water polo player. He competed in the men's tournament at the 1936 Summer Olympics.

Minister of Finance from 1950 to 1955 with a brief period from December 1950 to May 1951 serving as Minister of Education and Public Works

Served as President of the Malta Football Association from 1946 to 1953
