= Frank Wismayer =

Maltese water polo player (1913–2003)

Personal information
- Nationality: Maltese
- Born: 18 March 1913
- Died: 4 May 2003 (aged 90)

Sport
- Sport: Water polo

Frank Wismayer (18 March 1913 – 4 May 2003) was a Maltese water polo player. He competed in the men's tournament at the 1936 Summer Olympics. Wismayer died in May 2003, at the age of 90.
