= Petr Lohnický =

Czech swimmer

Personal information
- Born: 1 August 1941 Hradec Králové, Czechoslovakia
- Died: 2 September 2005 (aged 64)

Sport
- Sport: Swimming

Petr Lohnický (1 August 1941 – 2 September 2005) was a Czech swimmer. He competed in three events at the 1964 Summer Olympics.
