= Jim Bicknell =

Australian rules footballer, born 1910

Personal information
- Full name: James Francis Bicknell
- Born: 12 September 1910; Colac, Victoria
- Died: 16 May 1991 (aged 80); Dromana, Victoria
- Original team: South Kensington
- Height: 173 cm (5 ft 8 in)
- Weight: 75 kg (165 lb)
- Position: Rover

Playing career^{1}
Years	Club	Games (Goals)
1933–34, 1936–38	North Melbourne	57 (7)
- ^{1} Playing statistics correct to the end of 1938.

James Francis Bicknell (12 September 1910 – 16 May 1991) was a former Australian rules footballer who played with North Melbourne in the Victorian Football League (VFL).
