= Takimi Wakayama =

Japanese water polo player

Personal information
- Nationality: Japanese
- Born: 30 March 1914; Hiroshima, Japan
- Died: September 1941 (aged 27); China

Sport
- Sport: Water polo

Takimi Wakayama (若山滝美, Wakayama Takimi, 30 March 1914 – September 1941) was a Japanese water polo player. He competed in the men's tournament at the 1936 Summer Olympics. Conscripted to fight in the Second Sino-Japanese War, he died of typhoid fever on the frontlines in 1941.
