= Benjamin Vessaz =

Swiss water polo player

Personal information
- Nationality: Swiss
- Born: 2 July 1907

Sport
- Sport: Water polo

Benjamin Vessaz (born 2 July 1907, date of death unknown) was a Swiss water polo player. He competed in the men's tournament at the 1936 Summer Olympics.
