= Jan van Heteren =

Dutch water polo player (1916–1992)

Personal information
- Born: 20 December 1916; Batavia, Dutch East Indies
- Died: 30 June 1992 (aged 75); Breda, Netherlands

Sport
- Sport: Water polo

Jan Hijko van Heteren (20 December 1916 – 30 June 1992) was a Dutch water polo player who competed in the 1936 Summer Olympics. He was part of the Dutch team which finished fifth in the 1936 tournament. He played three matches.
