= Úlfar Þórðarson =

Icelandic water polo player (1911–2002)

Personal information
- Nationality: Icelandic
- Born: 2 August 1911; Kleppur, Iceland
- Died: 28 February 2002 (aged 90); Reykjavík, Iceland

Sport
- Sport: Water polo

Úlfar Þórðarson (2 August 1911 – 28 February 2002) was an Icelandic water polo player. He competed in the men's tournament at the 1936 Summer Olympics.
