= Pippo Schembri =

Maltese water polo player (1911–1981)

Personal information
- Nationality: Maltese
- Born: 17 February 1911

Sport
- Sport: Water polo

Pippo Schembri (17 February 1911 – 15 September 1981) was a Maltese water polo player. He competed in the men's tournament at the 1936 Summer Olympics.
