= Desmond Cleary =

Irish footballer (1925–2005)

Personal information
- Date of birth: 8 July 1925
- Place of birth: Dublin, Ireland
- Date of death: 7 September 2005 (aged 80)
- Place of death: Banning, California, U.S.

International career
Years	Team	Apps	(Gls)
- Ireland

Desmond Cleary (8 July 1925 – 7 September 2005) was an Irish footballer. He competed in the men's tournament at the 1948 Summer Olympics.
