= Jónas Halldórsson =

Icelandic water polo player (1914–2005)

Personal information
- Nationality: Icelandic
- Born: 13 June 1914; Ölfus, Iceland
- Died: 10 September 2005 (aged 91); Seljahlíð, Iceland

Sport
- Sport: Water polo

Jónas Halldórsson (13 June 1914 – 10 September 2005) was an Icelandic water polo player. He competed in the men's tournament at the 1936 Summer Olympics. Jónas was born as one of thirteen siblings of the married couple Halldór Jónsson (1885-1950) and Guðrún Jónasdóttir (1880-1965). At a young age, the Icelander moved with his family to the capital Reykjavík, and after the separation of his parents, he grew up first with his father, and later with the couple Ólafur Jónsson and Guðfinna Jónsdóttir, who were friends, in the district of Laugarnes. Jónas had been married to Jónas Rósa Gestsdóttir (1920-2001) since 1941. He died at the age of 91 in a home for the elderly in Northern Iceland, leaving behind a son, two grandchildren, and seven great-grandchildren.
