= David McGregor (water polo) =

British water polo player

Personal information
- Born: 7 February 1909; Motherwell, Scotland
- Died: 1990 (aged 80–81); Johnstone, Scotland

Sport
- Sport: Water polo

David Blaine McGregor (7 February 1909 – 1990) was a British water polo player who competed in the 1936 Summer Olympics. He was part of the British team which finished eighth in the 1936 tournament. He played three matches. He was also captain of the Scotland national team.

His son, Bob McGregor, competed as a swimmer at the 1964 and 1968 Summer Olympics, winning a silver medal in the 100 metres freestyle event in 1964.
