= Louis Stynen =

Belgian architect

- Born: 16 March 1907; Borgerhout, Belgium
- Died: 14 May 1991 (aged 84); Borgerhout, Belgium
- Occupation: Architect

Louis Stynen (16 March 1907 – 14 May 1991) was a Belgian architect. His work was part of the architecture event in the art competition at the 1932 Summer Olympics.
