= Sydney Scott =

Maltese water polo player

Personal information
- Nationality: Maltese
- Born: 28 July 1910
- Died: 1990 (aged 79–80)

Sport
- Sport: Water polo

Sydney Scott (28 July 1910 – 1990) was a Maltese water polo player. He competed in the men's tournament at the 1936 Summer Olympics.
