= René Joder =

French water polo player (1913–2005)

Personal information
- Nationality: French
- Born: 27 February 1913
- Died: 9 July 2005 (aged 92)

Sport
- Sport: Water polo

René Joder (27 February 1913 – 9 July 2005) was a French water polo player. He competed in the men's tournament at the 1936 Summer Olympics.
