= John Slade (field hockey) =

American field hockey player

John Slade (born Hans Schlesinger, May 30, 1908 – September 12, 2005) was an American field hockey player. He competed at the 1948 Summer Olympics. Born in Germany in 1908, Slade emigrated to the United States in 1935. During World War II, Slade served in the United States Army as an interrogator of German prisoners of war, being awarded a Bronze Star Medal for his service.
