= Alfred Lanzon =

Maltese water polo player

Personal information
- Nationality: Maltese
- Born: 18 November 1916
- Died: 2 June 1979 (aged 62)

Sport
- Sport: Water polo

Alfred Lanzon (18 November 1916 – 2 June 1979) was a Maltese water polo player. He competed in the men's tournament at the 1936 Summer Olympics.
