= Willem Jacob Visser =

Willem Jacob Visser (27 December 1914, Rotterdam – 16 May 1991, Zeist) worked to unite the organizations of different auxiliary languages. In the 1970s, he edited a magazine Union in Eurolatin, his own variation of Interlingua. In the pages of Union, he published articles and excerpts from users of all auxiliary languages and their periodicals. Visser argued that "interlinguists throughout the world should become friends", and his magazine is credited with improving understanding. He was Ido Representative in the Netherlands and later a member of Interlingua-Nederland.
