= Vladimir Leontyev =

Russian sailor

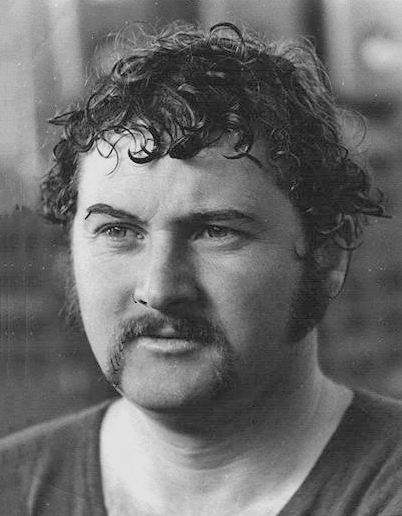

Personal information
- Born: 4 November 1946 Moscow, Russia
- Died: 21 September 2005 (aged 58) Moscow, Russia
- Height: 168 cm (5 ft 6 in)
- Weight: 77 kg (170 lb)

Sport
- Sport: Sailing
- Club: Soviet Army Moscow

Vladimir Pavlovich Leontyev (Russian: Владимир Павлович Леонтьев, 4 November 1946 – 21 September 2005) was a Russian sailor. He competed in the Flying Dutchman class at the 1972, 1976 and 1980 Olympics and placed fifth-sixth. Domestically he won 11 Soviet titles in this event between 1969 and 1981.

Leontyev was born in a family of competitive sailors, and took up the sport in 1957. He graduated from the Institute of Physical Education in Yerevan, and after retiring from competitions worked as a sailing coach.
