= Edmond Michiels =

Belgian water polo player

Personal information
- Born: October 12, 1913 Saint-Gilles, Belgium
- Died: May 23, 1991 (aged 77) Laroque-des-Albères, France

Sport
- Sport: Water polo
Medal record
Representing Belgium
Olympic Games
Bronze medal – third place	1936 Berlin	Team competition

Edmond Michiels (12 October 1913 – 23 May 1991) was a Belgian water polo player who competed in the 1936 Summer Olympics.

He was part of the Belgian team which won the bronze medal. He played two matches.

== See also ==
- List of Olympic medalists in water polo (men)
