= Alberto Batignani =

Uruguayan water polo player

Personal information
- Full name: Alberto Geronimo Batignani Trucco
- Born: 30 September 1912 Montevideo, Uruguay
- Died: 19 June 1990 (aged 77)

Sport
- Sport: Water polo

Alberto Batignani (30 September 1912 – 19 June 1990) was a Uruguayan water polo player. He competed in the men's tournament at the 1936 Summer Olympics. He was also a breaststroke swimmer.
