= Wilfred Podestá =

Maltese water polo player

Personal information
- Nationality: Maltese
- Born: 6 March 1912
- Died: 30 June 1973 (aged 61)

Sport
- Sport: Water polo

Wilfred Podestá MBE (6 March 1912 – 30 June 1973) was a Maltese water polo player. He competed in the men's tournament at the 1936 Summer Olympics.
