= Camillo Torreggiani =

Italian sculptor (1820–1896)

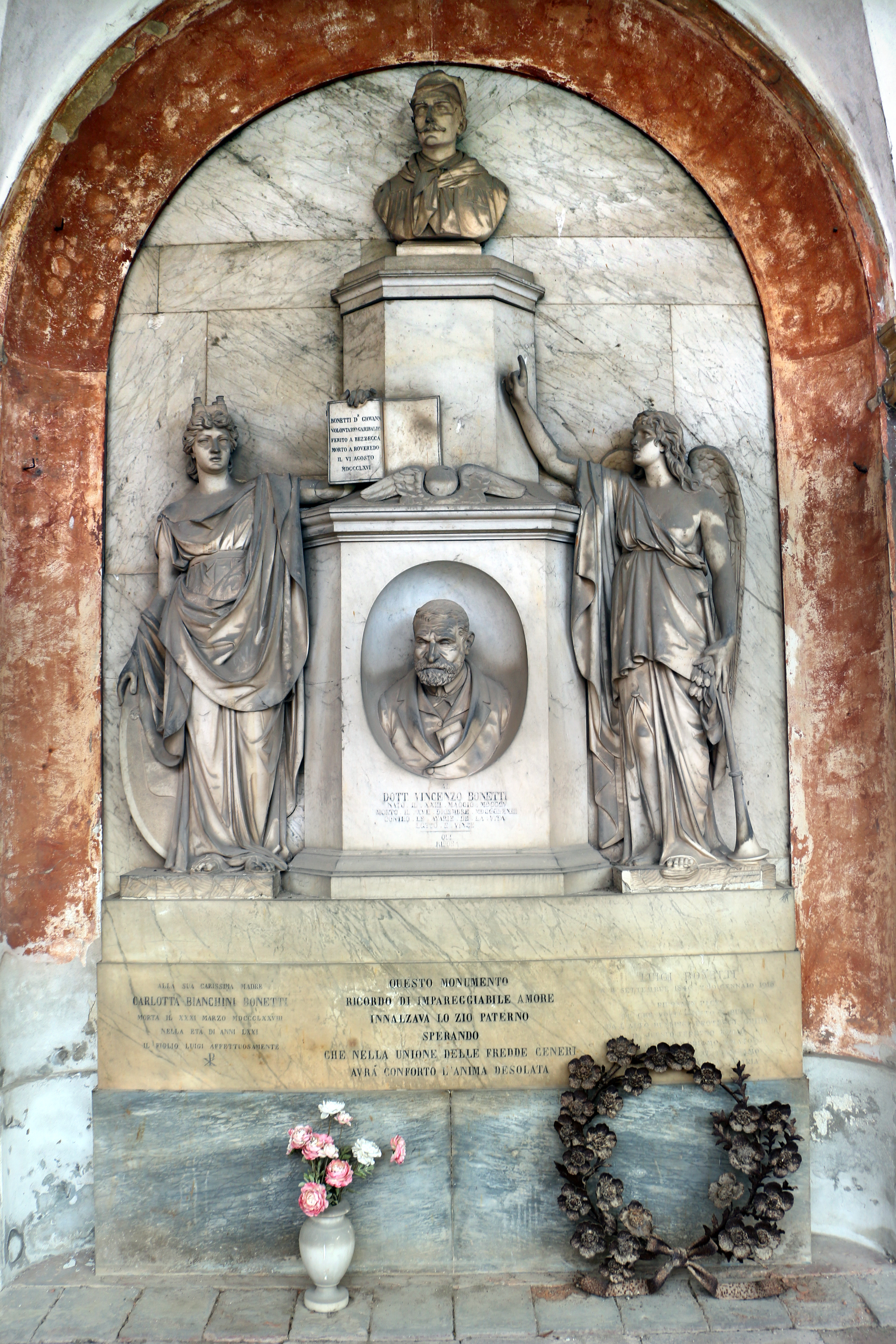
Tomb to Vincenzo Bonetti, 1870s, Cimitero Monumentale of Ferrara

Camillo Torreggiani (March 19, 1820 - 1896) was an Italian sculptor.

== Biography ==
Born to a poor family, at 20 years, he left Ferrara in search of work. He worked in Bologna in the decorations of the palazzo del Podestà, which was being restored. He worked in the church of Santa Maria del Soccorso of Livorno. He moves to Florence, to work under the sculptor Luigi Pampaloni. For Pampaloni, Torreggiani completed many portraits. He stayed in Florence eleven years, then he returned to his Ferrara, where he opened a studio. At the cemetery of Ferrara he completed the monuments for the Mantovani and Botti families; a monument to the American Lovel Putman, a monument to the family of Cavaliere Santini, a monument to the lawyer Marcellino Lombardi, a monument to Maragola. He also made the monument in honor of the Garibaldino patriot Bonetti, who died at the Battle of Bezzecca. The allegory depicts the personification of the city of Ferrara, who inscribes his name in the annals of his country's history. He also made busts of the patrons of the Hospital in the Casa di Ricovero. He completed a bust of Vittorio Emanuele for the City of Terni.

Torreggiani traveled widely through Europe, to Paris, London, Vienna, and Madrid. In Madrid he sculpted a portrait bust of the former queen Isabella, for which he was awarded the Cross of Charles III. He also completed a portrait of Gioacchino Rossini for the Republic of San Marino.

In 1860, the City Council of Cento commissioned from Torreggiani a marble bust of Count Cavour, placed in the Council Hall. For the City Hall of Rovigo, in 1860, he sculpted a marble bust of Count De Angelis.

He was commissioned by Cardinal Michele Viale-Prelà a large statue of the Immaculate Conception. Immacolata, made from Carrara marble. He also completed a portrait of the singer Erminia Frezzolini and lawyer Carlo Mayer and Vincenzo Pareschi (1803-1887).
