= Béla Pósa =

Hungarian footballer

Personal information
- Date of birth: 25 June 1914
- Place of birth: Nagytétény, Hungary
- Date of death: 6 May 1991 (aged 76)
- Place of death: Budapest, Hungary
- Position: Defender

International career
Years	Team	Apps	(Gls)
1940–1947	Hungary	3	(0)

Béla Pósa (25 June 1914 – 6 May 1991) was a Hungarian footballer. He played in three matches for the Hungary national football team from 1940 to 1947. He was also part of Hungary's squad for the football tournament at the 1936 Summer Olympics, but he did not play in any matches.
