= Franz Schönfels =

Austrian water polo player (1913–2005)

Personal information
- Nationality: Austrian
- Born: 5 August 1913
- Died: 25 September 2005 (aged 92)

Sport
- Sport: Water polo

Franz Schönfels (5 August 1913 – 25 September 2005) was an Austrian water polo player. He competed in the men's tournament at the 1936 Summer Olympics.
