= Joseph Demicoli =

Maltese water polo player

Personal information
- Nationality: Maltese
- Born: 31 October 1914
- Died: 20 August 1962 (aged 47)

Sport
- Sport: Water polo

Joseph Demicoli (31 October 1914 – 20 August 1962) was a Maltese water polo player. He competed in the men's tournament at the 1936 Summer Olympics.
