= 1936 Summer Olympics opening ceremony =

- Part of 1936 Summer Olympics
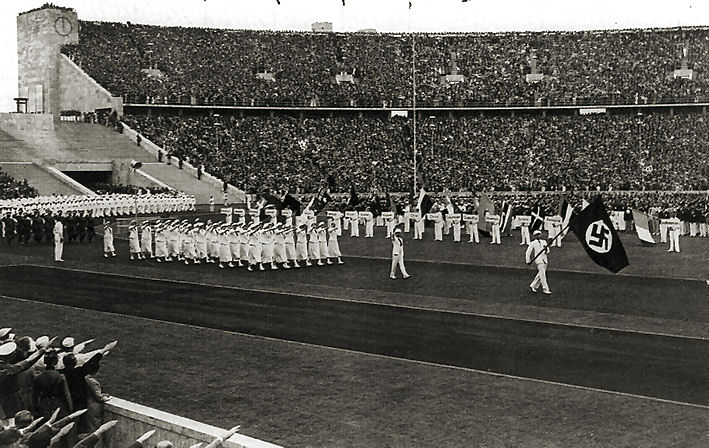
- 1936 Summer Olympics opening ceremony
- Date: 1 August 1936; 90 years ago
- Venue: Olympiastadion
- Location: Berlin, Germany; 52°31′06.4″N 13°14′16″E
- Filmed by: Reich Broadcasting Corporation

The Opening Ceremony of the 1936 Summer Olympics was the official opening ceremony held on August 1, 1936, at the Reichssportsfeld in Berlin, Germany. It was attended by the German Führer und Reichskanzler Adolf Hitler, as well as several high-profile Nazi figures.

German weightlifter Rudolf Ismayr gave the Olympic Oath.
