= Stan Richards (announcer) =

American sports announcer

- Born: c. 1931; Mississippi, United States
- Died: May 22, 1991
- Occupation: Public address announcer
- Years active: 1973 – 1991

Stan Richards (c. 1931 – May 22, 1991) was a public address announcer for the Phoenix Suns of the National Basketball Association.

== Career ==
Richards, who made his debut in December 1973, was the Suns' arena voice for 17 seasons at Veterans Memorial Coliseum. On March 24, 1987, he was involved in a controversy after the Suns' general manager Jerry Colangelo ordered him midway through the first quarter of the Suns game against the Los Angeles Lakers to announce that "the Suns have eight fouls, the Lakers have none", much to the chagrin of the referees. Although Richards escaped punishment for the stunt, Colangelo was fined an undisclosed amount by the NBA for prompting a public address announcer into making an "intimidating announcement".

== Deteriorating health and death ==
After suffering a series of microstrokes in December 1989, which forced him to miss only the second game of his career, Richards decided to retire in August 1990. He remained with the Suns in an advisory capacity during the 1990–1991 season but came out of retirement in April to announce the Suns' two home playoff games against the Utah Jazz. A few days later, he was hospitalized after suffering a mild heart attack.

Richards died at home in his sleep on May 22, 1991.
