= Herbert Schäfer =

German footballer (1927–1991)

Personal information
- Date of birth: 16 August 1927
- Place of birth: Siegen, Germany
- Date of death: 6 May 1991 (aged 63)
- Place of death: Siegen, Germany

Senior career*
Years	Team	Apps	(Gls)
- Sportfreunde Siegen

International career
1952, 1956	Germany		
- * Club domestic league appearances and goals

Herbert Schäfer (16 August 1927 – 6 May 1991) was a German international footballer who played for Sportfreunde Siegen. He also competed in the 1952 Summer Olympics and in the 1956 Summer Olympics. He was born and died in Siegen.
