= Babsie Podestá =

Maltese water polo player

Personal information
- Full name: Arthur Podesta
- Nationality: Maltese
- Born: 6 March 1912
- Died: 6 June 2004 (aged 92)

Sport
- Sport: Water polo

Arthur (sive Babsie) Podestá (6 March 1912 – 6 June 2004) was a Maltese water polo player. He competed in the men's tournament at the 1936 Summer Olympics.

== Career ==
Arthur Podestá participated in Water polo, representing Malta, at the 1936 Summer Olympics in Berlin (these were his only Olympic Games).

Podestá's first match was against Great Britain, a team that was not only superior but also exceptionally tough. Malta suffered a 2-8 defeat, with goals scored by Podestá and Sydney Scott. In their second match against Hungary, Malta found themselves trailing 9-0 by halftime, and to make matters worse, Podestá did not play due to injury. The match ended in a 12-0 loss. In their final match against Yugoslavia, Malta was defeated 7-0.

During their time in Germany, the Malta Olympic team played several friendly matches, drawing 3-3 with Switzerland, losing 1-8 to Germany, and securing victories against Plauren Club (10-3), SV Berg (8-1), and Magdeburg (7-2).
