= Alfred Bencini =

Maltese sprinter and police commissioner (1917–1991)

Personal information
- Nationality: Maltese
- Born: 23 March 1917 Attard
- Died: 6 October 1991 (aged 74)
- Spouse: Lucy Bencini (née Dei Marchesi Testeferetta Bonici)

Sport
- Sport: Sprinting
- Event: 100 metres

Alfred John Bencini (23 March 1917 – 6 October 1991) was a Maltese Olympic sprinter and Commissioner of Police. He competed in the men's 100 metres at the 1936 Summer Olympics.

== Life ==
=== Early life and sports ===
Bencini was born in 1917 to Robert and Gemma (née Pellegrini-Petit) Bencini in Attard, Malta at their family home, Villa Marchesi. He was educated at the Old Lyceum, where he matriculated to the Royal University of Malta in 1934.

During his time at university, he concurrently played top-flight and second-division football at the Hamrun Spartans, Hibernians, Valletta F.C. and St George's. In 1936, he was the local 100m champion, and was therefore selected to represent Malta at the 1936 Summer Olympics.

=== Police ===
In 1939, in response to the start of the Second World War, Bencini passed public examinations to become a Police Inspector, as part of the Valletta and Water region. In his role as Police Inspector, Bencini had to arrest his uncle, also Alfred Bencini in 1942 for deportation to Uganda. In 1950, he served as the Chief Welfare Officer aboard the ocean liner Ocean Victory in his capacity as an Inspector of Police in Malta, as part of the large amount of Maltese immigration to Australia.

In 1956, he was promoted to superintendent.

In June 1971, ten days after Dom Mintoff took office as prime minister, Bencini was appointed Commissioner of Police, replacing Vivian de Gray who had caused Mintoff's government to collapse in 1959 and the revocation of the 1947 constitution. Bencini remained in office until January 1973 before retiring with pension over disputes with Mintoff about the appointment of Enoch Tonna as Adjutant despite his lack of seniority and merit, being replaced by his brother, Edward.

He would in 1981 publish an autobiography, Nothing But the Truth, which went into further depth about his disputes with Mintoff.

=== Personal life ===
Bencini was married until his death in 1991, and had 4 children, Raymond, Marlene, Freda and Denise. His daughter Marlene is the mother of Australian entrepreneur and CEO of Precision Group Shaun Bonétt.
