= Vyžlovka =

- Municipality
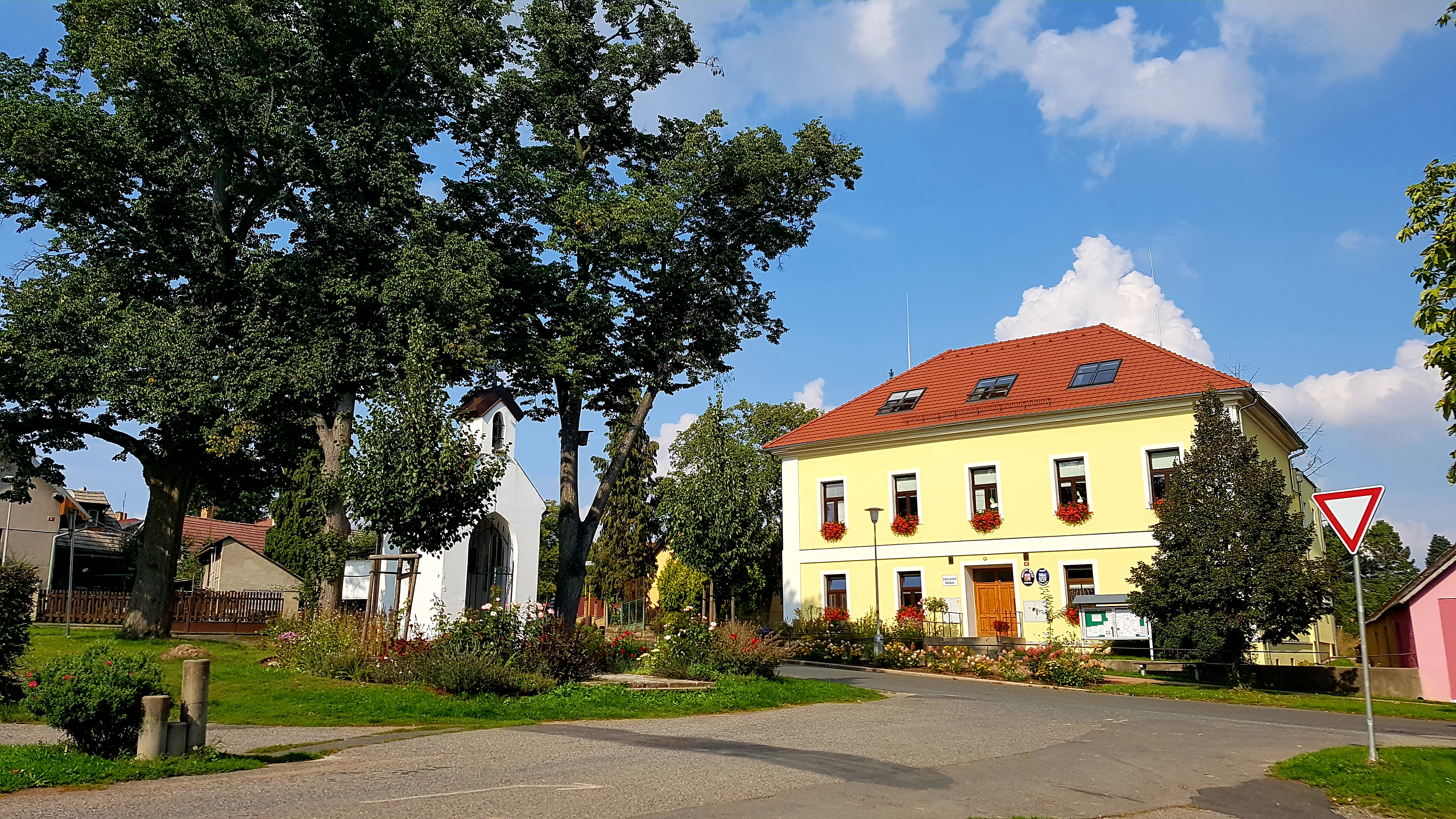
- Municipal office and primary school

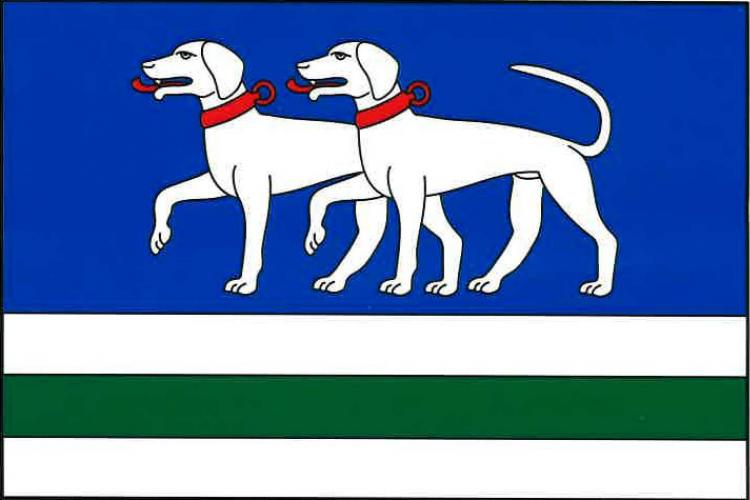
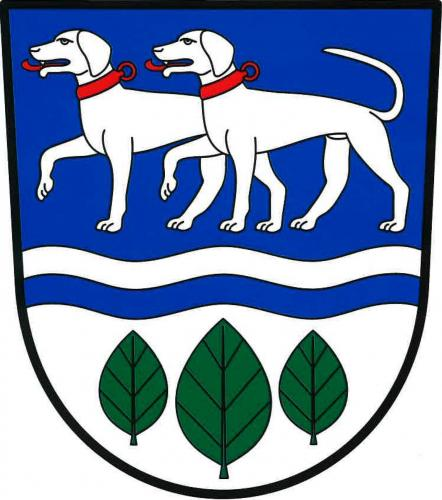
- Flag Coat of arms

- Location in the Czech Republic
- Coordinates: 49°59′5″N 14°47′21″E
- Country: Czech Republic
- Region: Central Bohemian
- District: Prague-East
- First mentioned: 1358

Area
  - Total: 3.79 km^{2} (1.46 sq mi)
- Elevation: 413 m (1,355 ft)

Population (2026-01-01)
  - Total: 857
  - Density: 226/km^{2} (586/sq mi)
- Time zone: UTC+1 (CET)
  - Summer (DST): UTC+2 (CEST)
- Postal code: 281 63
- Website: vyzlovka.cz

Vyžlovka is a municipality and village in Prague-East District in the Central Bohemian Region of the Czech Republic. It has about 900 inhabitants.

== Demographics ==
Historical population
Year	Pop.	±%
1869	299	—
1880	351	+17.4%
1890	397	+13.1%
1900	463	+16.6%
1910	446	−3.7%
1921	459	+2.9%
1930	518	+12.9%
1950	550	+6.2%
1961	661	+20.2%
1970	602	−8.9%
1980	553	−8.1%
1991	449	−18.8%
2001	452	+0.7%
2011	688	+52.2%
2021	797	+15.8%
Source: Censuses
