= Denis Zanoni =

Australian rules footballer (1941–1991)

Personal information
- Full name: Denis Norman Zanoni
- Born: 2 April 1941
- Died: 11 May 1991 (aged 50); Queenscliff, Victoria
- Original team: Queenscliff
- Height: 178 cm (5 ft 10 in)
- Weight: 73.5 kg (162 lb)

Playing career^{1}
Years	Club	Games (Goals)
1960–62	Geelong	14 (0)
- ^{1} Playing statistics correct to the end of 1962.

Denis Norman Zanoni (2 April 1941 – 11 May 1991) was an Australian rules footballer who played with Geelong in the Victorian Football League (VFL).
