= Jimmy Chetcuti =

Maltese water polo player (1913–1995)

Personal information
- Nationality: Maltese
- Born: 10 October 1913
- Died: 25 February 1995 (aged 81); Sliema, Malta

Sport
- Sport: Water polo

James Chetcuti Bonavita (10 October 1913 – 25 February 1995) was a Maltese water polo player. He competed in the men's tournament at the 1936 Summer Olympics.
