= Filip Bonačić =

Croatian water polo player

Personal information
- Nationality: Croatian
- Born: 27 January 1911; Split, Austria-Hungary
- Died: 30 May 1991 (aged 80); Villach, Austria

Sport
- Sport: Water polo

Filip Bonačić (27 January 1911 – 30 May 1991) was a Croatian water polo player. He competed in the men's tournament at the 1936 Summer Olympics.
