= Water polo at the 1936 Summer Olympics =

Men's water polo at the Games of the XI Olympiad
- Venue: Berlin
- Dates: 8–15 August
- Competitors: 142 from 16 nations

Medalists
1st place, gold medalist(s)		Hungary; Hungary
2nd place, silver medalist(s)		Germany; Germany
3rd place, bronze medalist(s)		Belgium; Belgium

Final results for the water polo tournament at the 1936 Summer Olympics:

== Medal summary ==
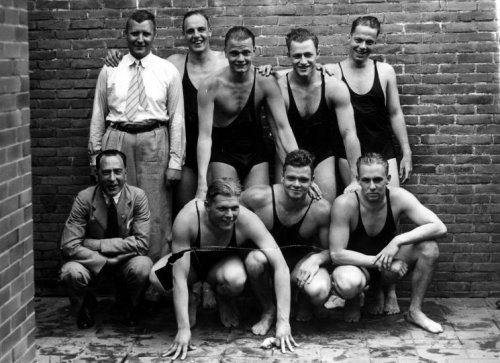
The Dutch water polo team

Gold	Silver	Bronze
Hungary; Mihály Bozsi; Jenő Brandi; György Bródy; Olivér Halassy; Kálmán Hazai; Márton Homonnai; György Kutasi; István Molnár; János Németh; Miklós Sárkány; Sándor Tarics	Germany; Bernhard Baier; Fritz Gunst; Josef Hauser; Alfred Kienzle; Paul Klingenburg; Heinrich Krug; Hans Schneider; Hans Schulze; Gustav Schürger; Helmuth Schwenn; Fritz Stolze	Belgium; Gérard Blitz; Albert Castelyns; Pierre Coppieters; Joseph De Combe; Henri De Pauw; Henri Disy; Fernand Isselé; Edmond Michiels; Henri Stoelen

== Results ==
=== Elimination rounds ===
In the first round each team in a group played each other team in the same group. The placings were determined on points. If the points were equal, then the better goal average decided. The first two teams of each group were qualified for the semi-finals, while the third and fourth placed team was eliminated.

Group 1

Rank	Team	Pld	W	D	L	GF	GA	Pts	(Belgium)	(Netherlands)	(United States)	(Uruguay)
1.	Belgium	3	2	1	0	6	4	5	X	1:1	4:3	1:0
2.	Netherlands	3	1	2	0	5	4	4	1:1	X	3:2	1:1
3.	United States	3	1	0	2	7	8	2	3:4	2:3	X	2:1
4.	Uruguay	3	0	1	2	2	4	1	0:1	1:1	1:2	X

Group 2

Rank	Team	Pld	W	D	L	GF	GA	Pts	(Hungary)	(United Kingdom)	(Kingdom of Yugoslavia)	(Malta)
1.	Hungary	3	3	0	0	26	2	6	X	10:1	4:1	12:0
2.	Great Britain	3	2	0	1	13	15	4	1:10	X	4:3	8:2
3.	Yugoslavia	3	1	0	2	11	8	2	1:4	3:4	X	7:0
4.	Malta	3	0	0	3	2	27	0	0:12	2:8	0:7	X

Group 3

Rank	Team	Pld	W	D	L	GF	GA	Pts	(Germany)	(France)	(Czechoslovakia)	(Japan)
1.	Germany	3	3	0	0	27	3	6	X	8:1	6:1	13:1
2.	France	3	2	0	1	12	10	4	1:8	X	3:2	8:0
3.	Czechoslovakia	3	1	0	2	7	12	2	1:6	2:3	X	4:3
4.	Japan	3	0	0	3	4	25	0	1:13	0:8	3:4	X

Group 4

Rank	Team	Pld	W	D	L	GF	GA	Pts	(Austria)	(Sweden)	(Switzerland)	(Iceland)
1.	Austria	3	3	0	0	17	1	6	X	2:1	9:0	6:0
2.	Sweden	3	2	0	1	18	2	4	1:2	X	6:0	11:0
3.	Switzerland	3	1	0	2	7	16	2	0:9	0:6	X	7:1
4.	Iceland	3	0	0	3	1	24	0	0:6	0:11	1:7	X

=== Semi-finals ===
As in the elimination round each team in a group played each other team in the same group unless they had met in the previous round. In this case the previous result stood and was carried forward to this group. So in each group only four matches had to be played. The placings were determined on points. If the points were equal, then the better goal average decided. The first two teams of each group were qualified for the final round, while the third and fourth placed team were eliminated and took part in a consolation tournament.

The results which are carried forward from the first round are shown in italics.

Group 1

Rank	Team	Pld	W	D	L	GF	GA	Pts	(Hungary)	(Belgium)	(Netherlands)	(United Kingdom)
1.	Hungary	3	3	0	0	21	1	6	X	3:0	8:0	10:1
2.	Belgium	3	1	1	1	7	5	3	0:3	X	1:1	6:1
3.	Netherlands	3	0	2	1	5	13	2	0:8	1:1	X	4:4
4.	Great Britain	3	0	1	2	6	20	1	1:10	1:6	4:4	X

Group 2

Rank	Team	Pld	W	D	L	GF	GA	Pts	(Germany)	(France)	(Austria)	(Sweden)
1.	Germany	3	3	0	0	15	3	6	X	8:1	3:1	4:1
2.	France	3	2	0	1	7	11	4	1:8	X	4:2	2:1
3.	Austria	3	1	0	2	5	8	2	1:3	2:4	X	2:1
4.	Sweden	3	0	0	3	3	8	0	1:4	1:2	1:2	X

=== Final round ===
As in the rounds before each team in the final played each other team unless they had met in a previous round. In this case the previous result stood and was carried forward to the final. So in the final only four matches had to be played. The placings were determined on points. If the points were equal, then the better goal average decided.

The results which are carried forward from the previous rounds are shown in italics.

Final Group

Rank	Team	Pld	W	D	L	GF	GA	Pts	(Hungary)	(Germany)	(Belgium)	(France)
Gold	Hungary	3	2	1	0	10	2	5	X	2:2	3:0	5:0
Silver	Germany	3	2	1	0	14	4	5	2:2	X	4:1	8:1
Bronze	Belgium	3	1	0	2	4	8	2	0:3	1:4	X	3:1
4.	France	3	0	0	3	2	16	0	0:5	1:8	1:3	X

Hungary won the Olympic Championship because their goal average was better (10/2 = 5) than Germany's (14/4 = 3.5).

Group for fifth to eighth places - consolation tournament

Rank	Team	Pld	W	D	L	GF	GA	Pts	(Netherlands)	(Austria)	(Sweden)	(United Kingdom)
5.	Netherlands	3	2	1	0	13	11	5	X	5:4	4:3	4:4
6.	Austria	3	1	1	1	9	9	3	4:5	X	2:1	3:3
7.	Sweden	3	1	0	2	8	8	2	3:4	1:2	X	4:2
8.	Great Britain	3	0	2	1	9	11	2	4:4	3:3	2:4	X

== Participating nations ==
Each country was allowed to enter a team of 11 players and they all were eligible for participation. All teams entered 11 players.

A total of 142(*) water polo players from 16 nations competed at the Berlin Games:

- Austria (11)
- Belgium (9)
- Czechoslovakia (7)
- France (7)
- Germany (11)
- Great Britain (11)
- Hungary (11)
- Iceland (8)
- Japan (8)
- Malta (9)
- Netherlands (9)
- Switzerland (8)
- Sweden (10)
- United States (9)
- Uruguay (7)
- Yugoslavia (7)

(*) NOTE: There are only players counted, which participated in one game at least.

Not all reserve players are known.

== Summary ==
Place	Nation
1	Hungary
	Mihály Bozsi (UTE); Jenő Brandi (MTK); György Bródy (III. ker TVE); Olivér Halassy (UTE); Kálmán Hazai (MTK); Márton Homonnai (MTK); György Kutasi (UTE); István Molnár (FTC); János Németh (UTE); Miklós Sárkány (III. ker TVE); Sándor Tarics (MAC)
2	Germany; Bernhard Baier; Fritz Gunst; Josef Hauser; Alfred Kienzle; Paul Klingenburg; Heinrich Krug; Hans Schneider; Hans Schulze; Gustav Schürger; Helmuth Schwenn; Fritz Stolze
3	Belgium Gérard Blitz; Albert Castelyns; Pierre Coppieters; Joseph De Combe; Henri De Pauw; Henri Disy; Fernand Isselé; Edmond Michiels; Henri Stoelen
4	France André Busch (CNL); Georges Delporte (EN Tourcoing); René Joder (CN Paris); Paul Lambert (EN Tourcoing); Maurice Lefèbvre (EN Tourcoing); Henri Padou (EN Tourcoing); Roger van de Casteele (EN Tourcoing)
5	Netherlands Ru den Hamer; Lex Franken; Hans Maier; Gé Regter; Kees van Aelst; Jan van Heteren; Soesoe van Oostrom Soede; Joop van Woerkom; Herman Veenstra
6	Austria Erwin Blasl; Wilhelm Hawlik; Anton Kunz; Alfred Lergetporer; Otto Müller; Sebastian Ploner; Peter Riedl; Franz Schönfels; Karl Seitz; Karl Steinbach; Franz Wenninger
7	Sweden Göte Andersson (Stockholms KK); Bertil Berg (SoIK Hellas); Erik Holm (SoIK Hellas); Tore Lindzén (Stockholms KK); Tore Ljungqvist (SK Neptun); Åke Nauman (Stockholms KK); Gösta Persson (SK Neptun); Sven-Pelle Pettersson (SK Neptun); Runar Sandström (SK Neptun); Georg Svensson (SoIK Hellas)
8	Great Britain Leslie Ablett; Ernest Blake; David Grogan; William Martin; David McGregor; Frederick Milton; Robert Mitchell; Alfred North; Leslie Palmer; Reginald Sutton; Edward Temme
9	United States Coach: Clyde Swendsen (Hollywood Athletic Club); Kenneth Beck; Philip Daubenspeck; Charles Finn; Dixon Fiske; Fred Lauer (Illinois Athletic Club); Charles McCallister (Los Angeles Athletic Club); Wally O'Connor; Raymond Ruddy (New York Athletic Club); Herbert Wildman Frank C. Graham (Los Angeles Athletic Club); William E. Kelly
10	Yugoslavia Filip Bonačić; Luka Ciganović; Vinko Cvjetković; Miro Mihovilović; Ante Roje; Mirko Tarana; Bogdan Tošović Dejan Dabović; Ivo Đovaneli; Vojko Pavičić; Ivo Štakula
11	Czechoslovakia Lešek Boubela; Josef Bušek; Kurt Epstein; Konstantin Koutek; Josef Medřický; Karel Schmuck; Hugo Vondřejc
12	Switzerland Ferdinand Denzler; Jean Gysel; Werner Kopp; Heinz Meier; Robert Mermoud; Benjamin Vessaz; Robert Wyss; Roger Zirilli
13	Uruguay Enrique Pereira (Club Neptuno); José Pescador (Guruyú Waston); Julio César Costemalle (Biguá); Maximino García (Club Neptuno); Francisco Figueroa (Club Neptuno); Hugo García (Biguá); Alberto Batignani (Club Neptuno); Jaime Castells (Club Neptuno); Nóbel Valentín (Club Neptuno); Renard Pérez (Club Neptuno)
14	Japan Jihei Furusho; Torajiro Kataoka; Shigetaka Katsuhisa; Yasutaro Sakagami; Zenjiro Takahashi; Kosei Tano; Koichi Wada; Takimi Wakayama
15	Iceland Jón Ingi Guðmundsson; Þórður Guðmundsson; Jónas Halldórsson; Þorsteinn Hjálmarsson; Jón Jónsson; Stefán Jónsson; Magnús Pálsson; Úlfar Þórðarson
16	Malta Jack Frendo Azzopardi; Joseph Demicoli; Alfred Lanzon; Frank Wismayer; Pippo Schembri; Babsie Podestá; Sydney Scott; Wilfred Podestá; Jimmy Chetcuti

== Sources ==
- PDF documents in the LA84 Foundation Digital Library:
  - Official Report of the 1936 Olympic Games, v.2 (download, archive) (pp. 345–356)
- Water polo on the Olympedia website
  - Water polo at the 1936 Summer Olympics (men's tournament)
- Water polo on the Sports Reference website
  - Water polo at the 1936 Summer Games (men's tournament) (archived)
