= Austin Cassar-Torreggiani =

Maltese sprinter

Personal information
- Nationality: Maltese
- Born: 23 July 1915 Valletta
- Died: 28 January 1978

Sport
- Sport: Sprinting
- Event: 100 metres

Austin A. Cassar-Torreggiani OBE (23 July 1915 – 28 January 1978) was a Maltese sprinter. He competed in the men's 100 metres at the 1936 Summer Olympics.

Cassar Torreggiani was born in Valletta and received his education at Stonyhurst College, UK and at St Edward's College, Malta.

In 1936 Cassar Torreggiani joined Cassar Co Ltd who owned and managed St George's Flour Mills (Malta); by 1949 he had accumulated such knowledge and proficiency in this vital business area of the economy that he was elected president of the Malta Millers' Association, a position he held up to 1962.

Cassar Torreggiani was also a director of the National Bank of Malta, and vice-chairman and joint managing director of Malta Bacon Co. Ltd. He was also involved in the textiles, property, and printing industries through directorships on the boards of Phoenix Textiles Industries Ltd., A.C.T. Property Co. Ltd., and St Paul's Press Ltd. He was elected president of the Federation of Malta Industries in 1967.

During World War II, Cassar-Torreggiani served in the KOMR (King's Own Malta Regiment) and was awarded the Efficiency Decoration (ED). He was also honoured as an Officer of the Order of the British Empire (OBE), for public services in Malta.
