= Alex Galletly =

Scottish swimmer

Personal information
- Nationality: British (Scotland)
- Born: c.1943 Scotland

Sport
- Sport: Swimming
- Event(s): Backstroke, Freestyle
- Club: Pullars ASC, Perth

Alexander C. Galletly (born c.1943) is a former swimmer from Scotland, who represented Scotland at the British Empire and Commonwealth Games (now Commonwealth Games).

== Biography ==
Galletly was a member of the Pullars Amateur Swimming Club in Perth and in August 1957 represented the Midlands District team.

In July 1958 he won the Scottish junior title over 100 yards backstroke.

He represented the 1958 Scottish swimming team at the 1958 British Empire and Commonwealth Games in Cardiff, Wales, participating in the 110 yards backstroke event. After the games, Galletly finished third in the backstoke at the British Swimming Championships.

Galletly was also proficient at freestyle and in 1965 won the Scottish 1650 freestyle title.

He represented the Scotland team again at the 1966 British Empire and Commonwealth Games in Kingston, Jamaica, where he participated in 440 yards freestyle, 220 yards butterfly events.
