= Deaths in July 2005 =

The following is a list of notable deaths in July 2005.

Entries for each day are listed alphabetically by surname. A typical entry lists information in the following sequence:

- Name, age, country of citizenship at birth, subsequent country of citizenship (if applicable), reason for notability, cause of death (if known), and reference.

== July 2005 ==
=== 1 ===
- Renaldo Benson, 69, American soul and R&B singer and member of The Four Tops, lung cancer.
- Rex Berry, 80, American football player (BYU Cougars, San Francisco 49ers).
- Gus Bodnar, 82, Canadian ice hockey player (Toronto Maple Leafs, Chicago Black Hawks, Boston Bruins).
- Ivan Kolev, 74, Bulgarian football player and Olympian (1952, 1956, 1960), heart attack.
- Luther Vandross, 54, American R&B singer, complications following a heart attack.

=== 2 ===
- Carla Candiani, 89, Italian film actress.
- Ernest Lehman, 89, American screenwriter (Who's Afraid of Virginia Woolf?, North by Northwest, West Side Story).
- Norm Prescott, 78, American co-founder of Filmation animation studios.
- B. N. Krishnamurti Sharma, 96, Indian writer, scholar, professor, and indologist.
- France Staub, 84, Mauritian ornithologist, botanist, and conservationist.
- Tom Talbert, 80, American jazz pianist, composer, and band leader.
- Gu Yue, 68, Chinese actor, heart attack.

=== 3 ===
- Muhammad Ashfaq, 58, Pakistani Olympic field hockey player (1968).
- Siv Ericks, 87, Swedish character actress.
- Nan Kempner, 74, American society hostess, pulmonary emphysema.
- Alberto Lattuada, 90, Italian film director, Alzheimer's disease.
- Pierre Michelot, 77, French jazz bassist, played with Miles Davis, Alzheimer's disease.
- Gaylord Nelson, 89, American politician, Governor of Wisconsin, U.S. Senator, heart attack.
- Sam Tata, 93, Canadian photographer.
- Hedy West, 67, American folksinger, cancer.
- Harrison Young, 75, American actor (Saving Private Ryan, House of 1000 Corpses, Passions).

=== 4 ===
- Chris Bunch, 62, American science fiction writer, lung ailment.
- Bryan Coleman, 94, British television and film actor.
- Al Downing, 65, American R&B and country & western musician, leukemia.
- Per Gedda, 90, Swedish Olympic sailor (1936, 1952).
- Cliff Goupille, 89, Canadian ice hockey player (Montreal Canadiens).
- June Haver, 79, American film actress, widow of Fred MacMurray, respiratory failure.
- Marga López, 81, Mexican film and television actress, heart failure.
- George C. McGhee, 93, American petroleum geologist and diplomat, pneumonia.
- Hank Stram, 82, American gridiron football coach (Kansas City Chiefs) and Pro Football Hall of Fame member, diabetes.
- John Stubblefield, 60, American jazz saxophonist, flautist, and oboist, prostate cancer.
- Lorenzo Thomas, 60, Panamanian-American poet.

=== 5 ===
- Leo Breiman, 77, American statistician.
- Bud Cullen, 78, Canadian judge and politician.
- Ray Davis, 65, American singer, founding member of Parliament/Funkadelic.
- Shirley Goodman, 69, American R&B singer.
- Baloo Gupte, 70, Indian cricketer.
- James Stockdale, 81, American Vice Admiral and Medal of Honor recipient, Alzheimer's disease.

=== 6 ===
- Bruno Augenstein, 82, German-American mathematician and physicist.
- L. Patrick Gray, 88, American Director of the United States FBI, pancreatic cancer.
- James Haskins, 63, American professor, biographer, and author, pulmonary emphysema.
- Evan Hunter, 78, American mystery novel writer, wrote under numerous pseudonyms (Ed McBain), cancer of the larynx.
- Huang Kun, 85, Chinese physicist.
- Donald McGinley, 85, American politician, U.S. Representative from Nebraska (1959–1961) and Lieutenant Governor of Nebraska (1983–1987).
- Jean Nelissen, 81, Belgian footballer.
- Al Porto, 79, American baseball player (Philadelphia Phillies).
- Claude Simon, 91, French writer and Nobel Prize winner.

=== 7 ===
- Henri Betti, 87, French composer and pianist.
- Paul Deliège, 74, Belgian comic book writer/artist, heart attack.
- Per Dohm, 67, US Virgin Islander Olympic sailor (1968).
- Gunnar Fredrik Hellesen, 92, Norwegian politician.
- Adolf Müller, 91, Swiss freestyle wrestler and Olympic medalist (1948).
- Gustaf Sobin, 69, American-French poet and novelist, pancreatic cancer.
- Juan Antonio Valencia, 75, Salvadoran Olympic sports shooter (1968, 1972).
- Notable deceased during the 7 July 2005 London bombings
  - Hasib Hussain, 18, British terrorist, suicide.
  - Mohammad Sidique Khan, 30, British terrorist, suicide.
  - Germaine Lindsay, 19, British terrorist, suicide.
  - Shehzad Tanweer, 22, British terrorist, suicide.

=== 8 ===
- Jean-Claude Arifon, 78, French Olympic hurdler (1948).
- Maurice Baquet, 94, French actor and cellist.
- Peter Boenisch, 78, German columnist and journalist, cancer.
- Denis Bray, 78, British civil servant in Hong Kong.
- Judy Mann, 61, American longtime columnist for The Washington Post, breast cancer.

=== 9 ===
- Ann Brewster, 86, American cartoonist and illustrator.
- Chuck Cadman, 57, Canadian politician Member of House of Commons of Canada (1997-), melanoma.
- Karim Emami, 75, Iranian translator, lexicographer, and literary critic, cancer.
- Yevgeny Grishin, 74, Russian speed skater, first speed skater under 40 seconds on 500 metres, and Olympian (1956, 1960, 1964, 1968).
- Kevin Hagen, 77, American actor (Little House on the Prairie), esophageal cancer.
- René Joder, 92, French Olympic water polo player (1936).
- Marie-Thérèse Morlet, 91, French scholar and honorary director of research at CNRS.
- Byron Preiss, 52, American writer, editor, and publisher, traffic collision.
- Melvin Read, 83, Canadian ice hockey player (New York Rangers).
- Alex Shibicky, 91, Canadian ice hockey player who made the first slapshot (New York Rangers).
- Al Sparlis, 85, American football player (UCLA Bruins, Green Bay Packers).
- Lu Wenfu, 77, Chinese writer.
- Rafiq Zakaria, 79, Indian Islamic scholar.

=== 10 ===
- Richard Eastham, 89, American actor (Tombstone Territory, That Darn Cat!, Wonder Woman), Alzheimer's disease.
- Jimmy Franklin, 57, American aerobatic pilot, plane crash.
- Serge Lancen, 82, French composer and classical pianist.
- Gavin I. Langmuir, 81, Canadian medievalist historian.
- Frank Moores, 72, Canadian politician, Premier of Newfoundland, cancer.
- A. J. Quinnell, 65, English writer, Man on Fire.
- Freddy Soto, 35, American comedian and actor.
- David V., 72, Malaysian unionist and politician.

=== 11 ===
- Francisco Casamayor, 56, Cuban Olympic weightlifter (1976, 1980).
- Gretchen Franklin, 94, English television actress ("Ethel Skinner").
- Shinya Hashimoto, 40, Japanese professional wrestler, intracranial aneurysm.
- Jesús Iglesias, 83, Argentine Grand Prix racing driver.
- David Ralph "Boag" Johnson, 83, American basketball player (Anderson Packers, Fort Wayne Pistons).
- John Kennedy-Good, 89, New Zealand politician.
- Frances Langford, 92, American singer and actress, heart attack.
- Samuel Schemberg, 79, Brazilian Olympic water polo player (1952).
- Robert Shevin, 71, American Attorney General and politician, esophageal cancer.
- Avabai Bomanji Wadia, 91, Ceylonese-Indian social worker, writer and family planning advocate.
- Theodore Woodward, 91, American medical researcher at the University of Maryland, Baltimore.

=== 12 ===
- Piero Cappuccilli, 78, Italian operatic baritone.
- Joseph Patrick Delaney, 70, American Roman Catholic bishop of the diocese of Fort Worth, Texas.
- Arthur Fletcher, 80, American government official, Assistant Labor Secretary under US President Richard Nixon.
- Willi Heinrich, 84, German author and soldier during World War II.
- P. K. Vasudevan Nair, 79, Indian politician, Chief Minister of Kerala state, India.
- Axel Strøbye, 77, Danish stage and film actor.
- Hugo Walser, 65, Liechtenstein Olympic middle-distance runner (1964).
- John King, Baron King of Wartnaby, 87, British peer, businessman and chairman of British Airways (1981-1993).

=== 13 ===
- Robert P. Abelson, 76, American psychologist and political scientist, Parkinson's disease.
- Asen Kisimov, 69, Bulgarian actor, singer and radio presenter.
- Ken Lunday, 92, American football player (New York Giants).
- Bob Maslen-Jones, 84, British Olympic sports shooter (1948).
- Robert E. Ogren, 83, American zoologist.
- Mickey Owen, 89, American former MLB baseball player for the Brooklyn Dodgers.
- J. B. Trapp, 79, New Zealand-British historian, writer, and academic.

=== 14 ===
- Jorge Aguirre, 80, Mexican athlete and Olympian (1948).
- Mark Carlisle, 76, British politician and peer.
- Michael Dahlquist, 39, American musician, film editor, and computer programmer, homicide.
- Tilly Fleischer, 93, German athlete and Olympian (1932, 1936).
- Coulby Gunther, 82, American basketball player (Pittsburgh Ironmen, St. Louis Bombers).
- Joe Harnell, 80, American composer, musician, and music arranger.
- Jerzy Jarnuszkiewicz, 86, Polish sculptor.
- Richard Leiterman, 70, Canadian cinematographer, amyloidosis.
- Cicely Saunders, 87, British palliative care activist, cancer.

=== 15 ===
- David Daiches, 92, Scottish literary critic.
- Anne Drungis, 74, American Olympic fencer (1964).
- Michael Gibson, 60, American Tony-nominated orchestrator and musician, lung cancer.
- Anders Hagen, 84, Norwegian archaeologist.
- Dick Haggie, 71, New Zealand rugby league footballer.
- John Muhato, 51, Kenyan Olympic sports shooter (1972).
- Leonor Orosa-Goquingco, 87, Filipino artist, dancer, and columnist.
- Stan Steele, 68, English football player.
- Alicia Vignoli, 94, Argentine film actress.
- Ronald Wilson, 82, Australian High Court justice.

=== 16 ===
- Blue Barron, 92, American orchestra leader.
- Gerry Conlee, 90, American football player (Cleveland Rams, Detroit Lions, San Francisco 49ers).
- Pietro Consagra, 84, Italian sculptor.
- Camillo Felgen, 84, Luxembourgish singer, disc jockey, and television presenter.
- Yi Gu, 73, Korean prince, heart attack.
- W. Fox McKeithen, 58, American politician, 5-time Louisiana Secretary of State, suicide from height.
- John Ostrom, 77, American paleontologist who revolutionized understanding of dinosaurs, Alzheimer's disease.
- Miguel Pérez, 68, Puerto Rican wrestler, heart attack.
- K. V. Subbanna, 73, Indian dramatist and writer.
- Dieter Wellershoff, 72, German admiral and Chief of Federal Armed Forces Staff (1986-1991).

=== 17 ===
- Laurel Aitken, 77, Jamaican musician, heart attack.
- Izabella Bashmakova, 84, Russian historian of mathematics.
- David Cluett, 39, Maltese footballer.
- Biplab Dasgupta, 66, Indian economist, Parkinson's disease.
- Geraldine Fitzgerald, 91, Irish-born American actress, Alzheimer's disease.
- Hans Hansen, 90, Norwegian competition rower and Olympic medalist (1948).
- Sir Edward Heath, 89, British politician, Prime Minister (1970–1974), MP (1950–2001), pneumonia.
- Tommy Johnson, 73, Swedish actor.
- Gina Lagorio, 83, Italian writer.
- Gavin Lambert, 80, British-American novelist, screenwriter (Inside Daisy Clover, Sons and Lovers).
- Mojtaba Mirzadeh, 60, Iranian-Kurdish violin, kamancheh, and setar master.
- Spartak Mishulin, 78, Soviet actor and People's Artist of the RSFSR, heart attack.
- I. G. Patel, 80, Indian economist, Governor of the Reserve Bank of India (1977–1982).
- Jim Pearce, 80, American baseball player (Washington Senators, Cincinnati Redlegs).
- Dick Sipek, 82, American baseball player (Cincinnati Reds).
- Rie Vierdag, 99, Dutch freestyle swimmer and Olympian (1924, 1928, 1932).
- William Weatherspoon, 69, American songwriter and record producer.

=== 18 ===
- Carlton Elliott, 77, American football player (Virginia Cavaliers, Green Bay Packers).
- Walter Fritsch, 93, Chilean Olympic hurdler (1936).
- Amy Gillett, 29, Australian rower, cyclist and Olympian (1996), bicycle accident.
- Gilles Grondin, 62, Canadian educator and a politician, cancer.
- John Herald, 66, American folk musician and recording artist, suicide.
- Bill Hicke, 67, Canadian ice hockey right winger.
- Jim Parker, 71, American football player, (Baltimore Colts) and member of the Pro Football Hall of Fame.
- Gerry Thomas, 83, American marketing/sales executive and inventor of the TV dinner, cancer.
- Franz Weissmann, 93, Brazilian sculptor.
- William Westmoreland, 91, American army general, commander of U.S. forces during the Vietnam War (1964-1968), Alzheimer's disease.

=== 19 ===
- Jim Aparo, 72, American comic book artist (Batman, Phantom Stranger, Spectre).
- Alain Bombard, 80, French biologist and physician.
- Edward Bunker, 71, American author, screenwriter, and actor (Mr. Blue in Reservoir Dogs), surgical complications.
- Ed Cifers, 89, American football player (Tennessee Volunteers, Washington Redskins, Chicago Bears).
- Zihni Gjinali, 79, Albanian football player.
- Hastings Keith, 89, American politician, U.S. Representative from Massachusetts (1959-1973).
- Lucien Lazaridès, 82, French road bicycle racer.
- Barney McLean, 87, American skier and Olympian (1948).
- Toku Nishio, 65, Japanese actor and voice actor, Japan.
- John Tyndall, 71, British neo-nazi political activist, founder of the British National Party.

=== 20 ===
- Nikolai Aksyonenko, 56, Russian railway manager and politician, leukemia.
- Shrichand Bajaj, 71, Indian Olympic swimmer (1956).
- Josefina de Vasconcellos, 100, English sculptor.
- James Doohan, 85, Canadian actor (Star Trek), pneumonia and Alzheimer's disease.
- Finn Gustavsen, 79, Norwegian politician.
- Kayo Hatta, 47, American film director (Picture Bride), drowned.
- Falcon Black Hawkins Jr., 78, American district judge (United States District Court for the District of South Carolina).
- Gyula Hernádi, 78, Hungarian writer and screenwriter.
- David Tomblin, 74, British film and television director.

=== 21 ===
- Brynley Allen, 84, Welsh footballer.
- Long John Baldry, 64, British blues musician, infectious disease.
- Bruce Bolt, 75, Australian-American scientist and earthquake expert, pancreatic cancer.
- Andrzej Grubba, 47, Polish table tennis player and Olympian (1988, 1992, 1996), cancer.
- Alfred Hayes, 76, British wrestler and wrestling commentator, stroke.
- Anne-Lise Kielland, 85, Norwegian Olympic equestrian (1956).
- Tamara Lund, 64, Finnish soprano singer and actress, stomach cancer.
- Stanisław Stomma, 97, Polish lawyer, academic teacher, publicist, and politician.

=== 22 ===
- William Beatley, 81, British fencer and Olympian (1952).
- Jean Charles de Menezes, 27, Brazilian man wrongly accused as a fugitive terrorist, killed by London police officers.
- Dragoš Kalajić, 62, Serbian painter, philosopher and writer, cancer.
- Roland Luedtke, 81, American politician.
- Xue Muqiao, 100, Chinese economist, director of National Bureau of Statistics.
- Eugene Record, 64, American lead vocalist for The Chi-Lites, cancer.
- Hinako Sugiura, 46, Japanese author and cartoonist, laryngeal cancer.
- George D. Wallace, 88, American actor (Forbidden Planet, The Pajama Game), suicide from height.
- An Yeong-han, 87, South Korean Olympic discus thrower (1948).

=== 23 ===
- Ray Crist, 105, American centenarian and chemist.
- Tony Daniels, 81, American baseball player (Philadelphia Phillies).
- Joseph Dessertine, 84, French racing cyclist.
- Magdalene Epply-Staudinger, 97, Austrian diver and Olympian (1932, 1936).
- Edith Firth, 78, Canadian historian and librarian.
- Myron Floren, 85, American musician, longtime accordionist/bandleader on The Lawrence Welk Show, cancer.
- Ted Greene, 58, American fingerstyle jazz guitarist, columnist, and session musician, heart attack.
- Gaston Mayordomo, 82, French Olympic middle-distance runner (1948).
- Fintan Meyler, 75, Irish actress.
- Ray Oldham, 54, American gridiron football player (Pittsburgh Steelers), heart attack.

=== 24 ===
- Sir Richard Doll, 92, British epidemiologist, first person to link cigarette smoking and lung cancer.
- Pavel Dostál, 62, Czech minister for cultural affairs, pancreatic cancer.
- John Drawbridge, 74, New Zealand artist, muralist and printmaker.
- Vardan Kushnir, 35, Russian e-mail spammer, homicide.
- Tullia Magrini, 55, Italian anthropologist.
- Francis Ona, 52, Papua New Guinean Bougainville rebel leader, malaria.

=== 25 ===
- Paul Britten Austin, 83, British writer and broadcaster.
- Enrique Bautista, 71, Filipino sprinter and Olympian (1960).
- Ted Chapman, 71, Australian politician and Minister.
- Eddie Crook, 76, American Olympic boxer (1960), and Vietnam veteran.
- Sidney Hertzberg, 82, American basketball player (New York Knicks, Washington Capitols, Boston Celtics), heart attack.
- David Jackson, 71, British actor, heart attack.
- Sonny Liles, 85, American football player (Detroit Lions, Cleveland Rams).
- Albert Mangelsdorff, 76, German trombonist.
- Ford Rainey, 96, American actor (3:10 to Yuma, Halloween II, The Bionic Woman), stroke.
- Bruno Varani, 79, Argentine Olympic basketball player (1948).

=== 26 ===
- Betty Astell, 93, British actress, entertainer and widow of Cyril Fletcher.
- Pierre Broué, 79, French historian and Trotskyist revolutionary militant.
- Mario David, 71, Italian footballer.
- Alexander Golitzen, 97, Russian-American Oscar winning production designer (To Kill a Mockingbird, Spartacus, Phantom of the Opera), heart attack.
- Jack Hirshleifer, 79, American economist, prostate cancer.
- Thierry Jean-Pierre, 49, French judge and member of the European Parliament (MEP), cancer.
- Alex Kapter, 83, American football player (Northwestern Wildcats, Cleveland Browns).
- Gilles Marotte, 60, Canadian ice hockey player (Los Angeles Kings, Chicago Blackhawks, New York Rangers), pancreatic cancer.
- John Michael Montias, 76, French-born American economist and art historian.
- Danny Simon, 85, American comedy writer, brother of Neil Simon.

=== 27 ===
- Shelley Appleton, 86, American labor leader.
- Al Held, 76, American abstract painter.
- Julio Nudler, 63, Argentine economic journalist, lung cancer.
- Helen Phillips, 86, American opera singer.
- Carmen Provenzano, 63, Canadian politician, member of the House of Commons of Canada (1997-2004), heart attack.
- Dom Um Romão, 79, Brazilian jazz drummer, stroke.
- Marten Toonder, 93, Dutch author and cartoonist.
- Robert Wright, 90, American musical lyricist (team of Wright & Forrest – Grand Hotel, Kismet, Song of Norway, etc.).

=== 28 ===
- Virginia Dehn, 82, American painter and printmaker.
- Jacques Lacarrière, 99, French ice hockey player and Olympian (1928, 1936).
- Louis Metzger, 88, United States Marine Corps officer.
- Jair da Rosa Pinto, 84, Brazilian footballer.
- Ronnie Rowe, 81, Canadian ice hockey player (New York Rangers).
- Bergur Sigurbjörnsson, 88, Icelandic magazine editor and politician.
- Cheng Siyuan, 96, Chinese politician.

=== 29 ===
- Hermione Hammond, 94, English painter and portrait artist.
- Hildegarde, 99, American cabaret singer.
- Edwin Palmer Hoyt, 81, American writer and historian.
- Pat McCormick, 78, American television writer (The Tonight Show Starring Johnny Carson) and actor (Smokey and the Bandit, Scrooged), stroke.
- Al McKibbon, 86, American jazz double bassist.
- Fred Sledge Smith, 72, American R&B songwriter and record producer.
- Karlheinz Zöller, 76, German flutist.

=== 30 ===
- Olga Albizu, 81, Puerto Rican abstract expressionist painter.
- Carl Beam, 62, Canadian Ojibwe artist.
- Ray Cunningham, 100, American baseball player (St. Louis Cardinals), recognized as the oldest living former MLB player.
- Gib Dawson, 74, American football player (Texas Longhorns, Green Bay Packers).
- John Garang, 60, Sudanese Vice President, helicopter crash.
- Warner Jorgenson, 87, Canadian politician.
- Lucky Thompson, 81, American saxophonist, Alzheimer's disease.

=== 31 ===
- Vellupillai Devadas, 80, Singaporean Olympic field hockey player (1956).
- Wim Duisenberg, 70, Dutch banker and politician, heart attack while swimming and drowned.
- Armando Ferreira, 85, Portuguese footballer.
- Léopold Gernaey, 78, Belgian footballer.
- Mantle Hood, 87, American ethnomusicologist.
- Frank Mangiapane, 79, American basketball player (New York Knicks).
- Lauri Nevalainen, 78, Finnish rower and Olympic medalist (1952).
- John Beaumont Williams, 73, Australian botanist.
