= Deaths in April 2005 =

The following is a list of notable deaths in April 2005.

Entries for each day are listed alphabetically by surname. A typical entry lists information in the following sequence:

- Name, age, country of citizenship at birth, subsequent country of citizenship (if applicable), reason for notability, cause of death (if known), and reference.

== April 2005 ==
=== 1 ===
- Álvaro Alsogaray, 91, Argentinian politician and businessman, cancer.
- Philip Amelio, 27, American actor and teacher, bacterial infection.
- Lee Artoe, 88, American football player (Chicago Bears, Los Angeles Dons, Baltimore Colts).
- Paul Bomani, 80, Tanzanian politician and diplomat.
- Alexander Brott, 90, Canadian composer, conductor and violinist.
- Oswaldo Fadda, 84, Brazilian practitioner and developer of Brazilian jiu-jitsu, pneumonia.
- Harald Juhnke, 75, German entertainer.
- Jack Keller, 68, American songwriter, wrote themes to Bewitched and Gidget, leukemia.
- Thomas Kling, 47, German poet, lung cancer.
- Barry Stern, 45, American drummer (Trouble, Zoetrope), complications following surgery.
- Claes Turitz, 76, Swedish Olympic sailor (1960).
- Robert Coldwell Wood, 81, American political scientist and Secretary of Housing and Urban Development, stomach cancer.

=== 2 ===
- Jorge Brion, 71, Curaçaoan Olympic footballer (1952).
- Gérard Faucomprez, 60, French Olympic ice hockey player (1968).
- Trevor Foster, 90, Welsh rugby player.
- Nasri Maalouf, 94, Lebanese politician.
- Patricia McGee, 70, American politician and senator, pulmonary fibrosis.
- Philémon De Meersman, 90, Belgian cyclist.
- John O'Leary, 58, American politician, former U.S. ambassador to Chile, Lou Gehrig's disease.
- Pope John Paul II, 84, Polish Roman Catholic prelate, pope (since 1978), archbishop of Kraków (1964–1978), septic shock and cardio-circulatory collapse.
- Jacques Poitrenaud, 82, French film director and actor.
- Jacques Rabemananjara, 91, Malagasy politician, playwright and poet.

=== 3 ===
- Aleksy Antkiewicz, 81, Polish boxer and Olympic medalist (1948, 1952).
- Rick Blight, 49, Canadian ice hockey player (Vancouver Canucks, Los Angeles Kings), suicide.
- Frank Clair, 87, Canadian Football League coach (Toronto Argonauts, Ottawa Rough Riders), heart failure.
- Tony Croatto, 65, Italian-born Puerto Rican composer-singer, lung and brain cancer.
- Jef Eygel, 72, Belgian basketball player and Olympian (1952).
- Kader Firoud, 85, Algerian-French football player and manager.
- François Gérin, 60, Canadian politician, member of the House of Commons of Canada (1984–1993).
- Walt McCormick, 78, American football player (Washington Huskies, USC Trojans, San Francisco 49ers).

=== 4 ===
- Gordon Barton, 75, Australian businessman and political activist.
- Edward Bronfman, 77, Canadian businessman and philanthropist, colon cancer.
- Blanchette Brunoy, 89, French actress.
- Donald L. Kimball, 72, American politician and newspaper editor, member of the Iowa House of Representatives (1957–1961).
- Antonio Rivera, 41, Puerto Rican world champion boxer, asthma.

=== 5 ===
- Manuel Ballester, 85, Spanish chemist.
- Saul Bellow, 89, Canadian-born American Nobel Prize-winning author.
- Robert Borg, 91, American military officer and Olympic equestrian (1948, 1952, 1956).
- Michel Fontaine, 71, French Olympic sports shooter (1972).
- Abdul Mannan, 75, Bangladesh politician, minister of Home Affairs (1972–1973).
- Dale Messick, 98, American creator of the Brenda Starr comic strip.
- Dragoljub Minić, 68, Yugoslav chess Grandmaster.
- Chung Nam-sik, 88, South Korean football player, manager, and Olympian (1948).
- Debralee Scott, 52, American actress (Mary Hartman, Mary Hartman, Forever Fernwood, Police Academy), cirrhosis.
- Nils Svenwall, 86, Swedish art director.
- Neil Welliver, 75, American landscape painter, pneumonia.

=== 6 ===
- Frank Conroy, 69, American author and memoirist, colorectal cancer.
- Anthony F. DePalma, 100, American orthopedic surgeon, teacher, and humanitarian.
- Károly Ecser, 73, Hungarian weightlifter and Olympian (1964).
- Francesco Laudadio, 55, Italian film director, screenwriter and producer.
- Bernd Lorenz, 57, German football player.
- Geoff Millman, 70, English cricketer.
- Rainier III, 81, Prince of Monaco since 1949, kidney failure.
- Gerard Peters, 84, Dutch track and road cyclist.

=== 7 ===
- Cliff Allison, 73, British Formula One driver.
- Grigoris Bithikotsis, 82, Greek singer.
- Aleksandar Despić, 78, Serbian physicist and academic.
- Max von der Grün, 78, German novelist.
- Sydney Hudson, 94, British SOE agent and Olympic alpine skier (1936).
- Bob Kennedy, 84, American Major League Baseball player and manager.
- Haji Khanmammadov, 86, Azerbaijani and Soviet composer.
- Melih Kibar, 53, Turkish composer, skin cancer.
- Jose Melis, 85, Cuban-American former bandleader for The Tonight Show.
- Givi Nodia, 57, Soviet Georgian football player, heart attack.
- Yvonne Vera, 40, Zimbabwean novelist and writer, AIDS-related complications.
- Erna Woll, 88, German composer and church musician.

=== 8 ===
- Altti Alarotu, 59, Finnish pole vaulter and Olympian (1968).
- Al Gettel, 87, American baseball pitcher.
- Maurice Lafont, 77, French football player.
- Eddie Miksis, 78, American baseball player.
- Yoshitarō Nomura, 85, Japanese film director, pneumonia.
- Douglas Northcott, 88, British mathematician (ideal theory).
- Onna White, 83, Canadian Broadway choreographer.

=== 9 ===
- César Civita, 99, American-Argentine publisher.
- Andrea Dworkin, 58, American radical feminist writer and anti-pornography activist, myocarditis.
- Claude Greder, 71, French Olympic water polo player (1960).
- Anton Heyboer, 81, Dutch painter and printmaker.
- Jack Jeffery, 67, American racing driver.
- Scott Mason, 28, Australian cricketer, heart attack.
- Jerrel Wilson, 63, American football player (Kansas City Chiefs, New England Patriots), cancer.

=== 10 ===
- Carl Abrahams, 93, Jamaican painter.
- Archbishop Iakovos of America, 93, Ottoman-American primate of the Greek Orthodox Archdiocese of America (1959–1996), pulmonary fibrosis.
- Norbert Brainin, 82, Austrian violinist and founder of the Amadeus Quartet.
- Frederick C. Branch, 82, first African-American officer of the United States Marine Corps.
- Horacio Casarín, 86, Mexican football player and coach, Alzheimer's disease.
- Aatos Lehtonen, 91, Finnish footballer and Olympian (1936).
- Al Lucas, 26, American gridiron football player (Carolina Panthers), spinal cord injury suffered during game.
- Wally Tax, 57, Dutch singer and songwriter.
- Anatoly Trofimov, 64, Soviet and Russian KGB officer, homicide.
- Chen Yifei, 58, Chinese painter.

=== 11 ===
- John Bennett, 75, British actor (Watership Down, The Pianist, Doctor Who).
- John Brosnan, 57, British writer and film critic, acute pancreatitis.
- Jerry Byrd, 85, American Lap steel guitarist, Parkinson's disease.
- Floyd Chance, 79, American session musician.
- Junior Delgado, 46, Jamaican reggae singer, famed for his roots style.
- André François, 89, French cartoonist.
- James Hamilton, 87, British politician.
- Maurice Hilleman, 85, American microbiologist.
- Harry Holmqvist, 97, Swedish Olympic middle-distance runner (1936).
- David Hughes, 74, British novelist.
- Ivan Komarov, 83, Soviet Ukrainian Olympic fencer (1952).
- Lucien Laurent, 97, French football player, scored the first ever goal at a FIFA World Cup, and Olympian (1928).
- Charles Mays, 64, American politician, athlete, and Olympian (1968).
- Mattie McDonagh, 68, Irish Gaelic footballer.
- Doug Peden, 88, Canadian basketball player and Olympic medalist (1936).
- George Younce, 75, American Southern Gospel singer.

=== 12 ===
- Max Bumgardner, 81, American football player (Texas Longhorns, Detroit Lions).
- Rodolfo Gonzales, 76, Mexican boxer, poet, political organizer, and activist, kidney failure.
- Ehud Manor, 63, Israeli songwriter.
- Shahrokh Meskoob, 81, Iranian writer, translator, social critic, literary historian, and university professor, cancer.
- Georgi Pachedzhiev, 89, Bulgarian football manager.
- Barney Poole, 81, American football player.
- Dale Schroeder, 86, American carpenter and philanthropist.
- Cyril Sidlow, 89, Welsh football player.
- Gene Tapia, 80, American racing driver.
- Nelly Uchendu, 54/5, Nigerian musician, cancer.

=== 13 ===
- Don Blasingame, 73, American baseball player and manager.
- Salvatore Camarata, 91, American musician and co-founder of Disneyland Records.
- Julia Darling, 48, English novelist and poet, breast cancer.
- Wolfgang Droege, 55, German-Canadian founder of white supremacist group the Heritage Front, shot.
- Hiroaki Fukushi, 54, Japanese baseball player.
- Kay Gardella, 82, American television critic for the New York Daily News, cancer.
- Bob Hoffman, 87, American football player (Washington Redskins, Los Angeles Rams, Los Angeles Dons).
- Johnnie Johnson, 80, American musician, pneumonia.
- Nikola Ljubičić, 89, Serbian general and politician, president of Serbia (1982–1984).
- Ede Mađar, 73, Serbian Olympic gymnast (1952).
- Vaikom Chandrasekharan Nair, 85, Indian writer and journalist.
- Henry Proctor, 75, American competition rower and Olympic champion (1952).
- Philippe Volter, 45, Belgian actor, suicide.
- Nathaniel Weyl, 94, American writer, economist who testified in the Alger Hiss case.
- Juan Zanotto, 69, Italian-Argentinian comic book artist.

=== 14 ===
- Chet Aubuchon, 88, American basketball player (Michigan State Spartans).
- Benny Bailey, 79, American jazz trumpeter.
- Saunders Mac Lane, 95, American mathematician.
- Lothar Lindtner, 87, Norwegian actor.
- Gilberto Navarro, 75, Chilean Olympic sports shooter (1960, 1964).
- Ivailo Petrov, 82, Bulgarian writer.
- Richard Popkin, 81, American academic philosopher, pulmonary emphysema.
- Bernard Schultze, 89, German abstract painter.

=== 15 ===
- Jimmy Allan, 73, Scottish cricketer.
- Al Baisi, 87, American football player (West Virginia Mountaineers, Chicago Bears, Philadelphia Eagles).
- Martin Blumenson, 86, American military historian.
- Amjad Bobby, 63, Pakistani music composer and director.
- Peter Cargill, 41, Jamaican footballer, traffic collision.
- Art Cross, 87, American Indianapolis 500 racing driver.
- Jaime Fernández, 67, Mexican actor, heart attack.
- John Fred, 63, American pop singer, kidney disease.
- Ken Funston, 79, South African cricket player.
- John Hultberg, 83, American avant-garde painter.
- Carlos Muñoz, 86, Spanish actor.
- Ted Pavelec, 86, American football player (Detroit Lions).
- Margaretta Scott, 93, English actress ("Mrs. Pumphrey" in All Creatures Great and Small).

=== 16 ===
- Alfredo Abrantes, 75, Portuguese footballer.
- Laura Canales, 50, American Tejano singer, pneumonia.
- Herm Gilliam, 58, American National Basketball Association player (Portland Trail Blazers), heart attack.
- Kim Mu-saeng, 62, South Korean actor, pneumonia.
- Marla Ruzicka, 28, American activist and aid worker, car bombing in Iraq.
- Volker Vogeler, 74, German film director and screenwriter.
- Kay Walsh, 93, British actress.

=== 17 ===
- Hans Gruijters, 73, Dutch politician and journalist.
- James Archibald Houston, 83, Canadian author and artist.
- István Ilku, 72, Hungarian football goalkeeper.
- Lucien Masset, 90, French Olympic gymnast (1936, 1948).
- Vishnu Kant Shastri, 76, Indian politician, heart attack.
- Juan Pablo Torres, 58, Cuban trombonist, bandleader, and producer, brain tumor.

=== 18 ===
- Claus Bjørn, 60, Danish author, historian, and television and radio broadcaster.
- Donald Bruce, Baron Bruce of Donington, 92, British politician and peer.
- Peter F. Flaherty, 80, American politician and attorney.
- Bassel Fleihan, 42, Lebanese deputy and minister, complications following bomb attack on Rafiq Hariri.
- Clarence "Big House" Gaines, 81, American Basketball Hall of Fame coach, stroke.
- Géza Hoffmann, 76, Hungarian Olympic wrestler (1952).
- Norberto Höfling, 80, Romanian football player and coach.
- Julien Meuris, 83, Belgian Olympic basketball player (1948, 1952).
- Sam Mills, 45, American former NFL player (New Orleans Saints, Carolina Panthers), and assistant coach, cancer.
- Fred Negus, 81, American football player (Chicago Rockets/Hornets, Chicago Bears).
- Norman D. Newell, 96, American paleontologist and curator at the American Museum of Natural History.
- Kenneth Schermerhorn, 75, American music director and conductor, non-Hodgkin lymphoma.
- Alex Smart, 86, Canadian ice hockey player (Montreal Canadiens).

=== 19 ===
- Ronald Clarence Bean, 66, American politician, member of the Louisiana State Senate (1991–2003).
- Mike Brim, 39, American football player.
- George P. Cosmatos, 65, Italian-born Greek-American film director (Tombstone, Rambo: First Blood Part II, Cobra), lung cancer.
- Bobby Gage, 78, American gridiron football player (Clemson Tigers, Pittsburgh Steelers), heart attack.
- Ruth Hussey, 93, American film actress (The Philadelphia Story), surgical complications.
- Gerd Koch, 82, German cultural anthropologist.
- Frank Lavernia, 87, Cuban Olympic basketball player (1948).
- Stan Levey, 79, American jazz drummer.
- Clement Meadmore, 76, Australian-American furniture designer and sculptor, Parkinson's disease.
- László Nagy, 77, Hungarian pair skater and Olympian (1948, 1952, 1956).
- Niels-Henning Ørsted Pedersen, 58, Danish jazz upright bassist, heart attack.
- Erkki Penttilä, 72, Finnish wrestler and Olympic medalist (1956, 1960).
- Rex Ryon, 52, American actor.

=== 20 ===
- Olli Alho, 85, Finnish Olympic hurdler (1952).
- Shamil Asgarov, 75, Azerbaijani Kurdish scholar, poet, and historian.
- Inday Ba, 32, Swedish actress (also known as N'Deaye Ba), lupus erythematosus.
- Zygfryd Blaut, 62, Polish footballer.
- Gene Frankel, 85, American theater director, heart attack.
- Dragoslav Marković, 84, Serbian communist politician, serving as President and Prime Minister of Serbia.
- Fumio Niwa, 100, Japanese novelist, pneumonia.
- Jim Parmer, 78, American football player (Philadelphia Eagles).
- Giulio Saraudi, 66, Italian boxer and Olympic medalist (1960).

=== 21 ===
- Giordano Abbondati, 56, Italian figure skater and Olympian (1964, 1968).
- Valeriano Andrés, 82, Spanish film and television actor.
- Ed Butka, 89, American baseball player (Washington Senators).
- Zhang Chunqiao, 88, Chinese political theorist, member of the Gang of Four, pancreatic cancer.
- Gwynfor Evans, 92, Welsh politician.
- Frank Hoy, 70, Irish-Scottish professional wrestler.
- Bill Kaysing, 82, American conspiracy theorist.
- Feroze Khan, 100, Pakistani field hockey player and Olympian (1928).
- William Kruskal, 85, American mathematician and statistician, pneumonia.
- Cliff Montgomery, 94, American gridiron football player (Columbia Lions, Brooklyn Dodgers).
- Cyril Tawney, 74, British songwriter and folksinger.
- Wayne S. Vucinich, 91, American historian.

=== 22 ===
- Norman Bird, 80, British actor (Worzel Gummidge, The Lord of the Rings, Look and Read), cancer.
- Gregoire Boonzaier, 95, South African painter.
- Robert Fitzgerald, 81, American speed skater and Olympic silver medalist (1948, 1952).
- Erika Fuchs, 98, German Disney comics editor and translator.
- William Johnson, 58, American swimmer and Olympian (1968).
- Arnie Lawrence, 66, American jazz saxophonist.
- John Marshall, 72, American filmmaker, lung cancer.
- Philip Morrison, 89, American physicist and group leader in the Manhattan Project.
- Eduardo Paolozzi, 81, Scottish sculptor.
- Rodolfo Emilio Giuseppe Pichi-Sermolli, 93, Italian botanist.
- Barys Rahula, 85, Belarusian political activist.
- Leonid Shamkovich, 81, Soviet/Russian grandmaster chess player, Parkinson's disease.

=== 23 ===
- Sir Joh Bjelke-Petersen, 94, Australian politician, longest-serving Premier of Queensland.
- Robert Farnon, 87, Canadian Grammy Award winning arranger composer.
- Andre Gunder Frank, 76, German economic historian, proponent of dependency theory, cancer.
- Al Grassby, 78, Australian former politician and minister in the Whitlam government, heart attack.
- Sir John Mills, 97, British actor (Ryan's Daughter, Swiss Family Robinson, Gandhi), Oscar winner (1971), stroke.
- Achille Roncoroni, 82, Italian Olympic sailor (1948).
- Romano Scarpa, 78, Italian Disney comic book artist.
- J. B. Stoner, 81, American neo-Nazi, segregationist politician, and a domestic terrorist.
- Earl Wilson, 70, American baseball player, leading pitcher for the 1968 World Series champion Detroit Tigers, heart attack.
- Jimmy Woode, 78, American jazz bassist, heart attack.

=== 24 ===
- Adelle August, 71, American actress.
- Francis Bay, 90, Belgian conductor.
- Ralph Buchanan, 82, Canadian ice hockey player (New York Rangers).
- Roland Johansson, 74, Swedish Olympic boxer (1952).
- Ezer Weizman, 80, Israeli politician, President of Israel (1993–2000), respiratory failure.
- Fei Xiaotong, 94, Chinese researcher and professor of sociology and anthropology.

=== 25 ===
- Jim Barker, 69, American politician, stroke.
- John Love, 80, Rhodesian Formula One driver, cancer.
- René Maillard, 82, Swiss footballer.
- Čedomir Mirković, 61, Serbian writer, literary critic, television journalist, and politician.
- George Paskvan, 87, American football player (Wisconsin Badgers, Green Bay Packers).
- Swami Ranganathananda, 96, Indian religious leader, President of the Ramakrishna Order.
- Tanguturi Suryakumari, 79, Indian singer, actress and dancer.
- Alexander Trotman, Baron Trotman, 71, English chief executive and peer, head of Ford Motor Company.
- Shlomo Wolbe, 91, German-Swedish orthodox rabbi.

=== 26 ===
- Mason Adams, 86, American actor (Lou Grant, F/X, Omen III: The Final Conflict).
- Hasil Adkins, 67, American Rockabilly musician, homicide.
- Augusto Roa Bastos, 87, Paraguayan writer, winner of the Premio Cervantes.
- Michael Coles, 68, English actor.
- Gordon Campbell, Baron Campbell of Croy, 83, Scottish politician.
- Elisabeth Domitien, 79–80, Central African Republic politician, Prime Minister (1975–1976).
- Josef Nesvadba, 78, Czech psychiatrist and science fiction author.
- Johnny Sample, 67, American gridiron football player.
- Maria Schell, 79, Austrian actress (The Last Bridge, Gervaise, Superman), pneumonia.
- Stanley Shakespeare, 42, American football player (Miami Hurricanes, Cleveland Browns, Tampa Bay Buccaneers).

=== 27 ===
- Abdus Samad Azad, 83, Bangladeshi diplomat and politician, former foreign minister of Bangladesh, stomach cancer.
- Red Horner, 95, Canadian ice hockey player, former NHL player with the Toronto Maple Leafs.
- Tunney Hunsaker, 75, American professional boxer, Muhammad Ali's first professional boxing opponent.
- Stanley Orme, Baron Orme, 82, British politician.
- Ebrahim Sulaiman Sait, 82, Indian politician.
- Marian Sawa, 68, Polish composer, organist, and musicologist.

=== 28 ===
- Chuck Bittick, 65, American water polo player and Olympian (1960).
- Chris Candido, 33, American professional wrestler, blood clot from surgery complications.
- Odysseas Dimitriadis, 96, Georgian-Greek conductor.
- Percy Heath, 81, American bassist for the Modern Jazz Quartet, bone cancer.
- Pancho Herrera, 70, Cuban-born baseball player (Philadelphia Phillies).
- Douglas Johnson, 80, British historian.
- P.D. Orton, 89, English mycologist, specialising in agarics.
- Raymundo Punongbayan, 67, Filipino volcanologist, helicopter crash.
- Taraki Sivaram, 45, Sri Lankan Tamil journalist and activist, murdered.
- Erich Vermehren, 85, German military intelligence officer, World War II defector from the Abwehr.
- Fernando Walls, 74, Mexican Olympic sports shooter (1972, 1976).

=== 29 ===
- William J. Bell, 78, American screenwriter and television producer (The Young and the Restless, The Bold and the Beautiful), Alzheimer's disease.
- Dianne Brooks, 66, American jazz singer.
- Mel Gussow, 71, American theatre critic for The New York Times, cancer.
- Leonid Khachiyan, 52, Russian/American mathematician and computer scientist, heart attack.
- Pentti Laaksonen, 76, Finnish Olympic basketball player (1952).
- Mariana Levy, 39, Mexican actress, heart attack following a robbery attempt.
- Ulla Petersen, 71, Danish Olympic equestrian (1972, 1976).
- Johnnie Stewart, 87, British television producer (Top of the Pops).
- Bob Ward, 77, American gridiron football coach and player.
- Brook Williams, 67, British stage actor, lung cancer.

=== 30 ===
- Sylve Bengtsson, 74, Swedish football player and Olympian (1952).
- Wim Esajas, 70, Suriname Olympic middle-distance runner (1960).
- Lourens Muller, 87, South African politician.
- Niklaus Stump, 84, Swiss Olympic cross-country and Nordic combined skier (1948).
- Alfons Supersaxo, 79, Swiss Olympic skier (1948, 1952).
- Ron Todd, 78, English general secretary of the Transport and General Workers Union, leukemia.
