= 2005 in film =

2005 in film is an overview of events, including the highest-grossing films, award ceremonies, festivals, a list of country-specific lists of films released, notable deaths and film debuts. Harry Potter and the Goblet of Fire was the year's top-grossing film, and Crash won the Academy Award for Best Picture.

== Highest-grossing films ==
The top 10 films released in 2005 by worldwide gross are as follows:

Highest-grossing films of 2005
| Rank | Title | Distributor | Worldwide gross |
|---|---|---|---|
| 1 | Harry Potter and the Goblet of Fire | Warner Bros. | $895,921,036 |
| 2 | Star Wars: Episode III – Revenge of the Sith | 20th Century Fox | $849,997,605 |
| 3 | The Chronicles of Narnia: The Lion, the Witch and the Wardrobe | Buena Vista | $745,013,115 |
| 4 | War of the Worlds | Paramount / DreamWorks | $603,873,119 |
| 5 | King Kong | Universal | $556,906,378 |
| 6 | Madagascar | DreamWorks | $542,063,846 |
| 7 | Mr. & Mrs. Smith | 20th Century Fox | $487,287,646 |
| 8 | Charlie and the Chocolate Factory | Warner Bros. | $474,968,763 |
| 9 | Batman Begins | Warner Bros. | $373,443,774 |
| 10 | Hitch | Sony / Columbia | $371,594,210 |

== Events ==
| Month | Day | Event |
| January | 6 | The Directors Guild of America nominates directors Martin Scorsese (The Aviator), Marc Forster (Finding Neverland), Taylor Hackford (Ray), Clint Eastwood (Million Dollar Baby) and Alexander Payne (Sideways) for its Directors Guild Awards. |
| January | 9 | The People's Choice Awards go to Fahrenheit 9/11 (favorite motion picture), The Passion of the Christ for favorite drama, and Shrek 2 (favorite comedy, animated film, sequel, animated character: Eddie Murphy as "Donkey", and movie villain: Jennifer Saunders as "Fairy Godmother"). |
| January | 16 | Golden Globes awards film winners included three for The Aviator (Picture-Drama, Actor and Score), two for Sideways (Picture-comedy and Screenplay), two for Million Dollar Baby (Director and Actress), and two for Closer (Supporting Actor and Supporting actress for Clive Owen and Natalie Portman). |
| January | 22 | The Producers Guild of America picks The Aviator as its choice for best picture of 2004. |
| January | 24 | The Golden Raspberry Awards picks for worst film achievement in 2004 had Catwoman leading with seven nominations, Alexander, Fahrenheit 9/11 and White Chicks each with five and four nominations for Superbabies: Baby Geniuses 2. |
| January | 25 | The Academy Awards picks for best film achievement in 2004 had The Aviator leading nominations with 11, followed by Million Dollar Baby and Finding Neverland with seven, Ray with six, and Sideways with five. |
| February | 2 | Pierce Brosnan officially announces that he will be resigning from the role of James Bond. Brosnan last appeared as Bond in Die Another Day (2002). |
| February | 11 | The romantic comedy Hitch, starring Will Smith and Eva Mendes, is released in theaters. The film was a surprise success and later became the 10th highest-grossing film of the year. |
| February | 12 | BAFTA Awards: Major winners include Imelda Staunton, Best Actress, Jamie Foxx, Best Actor and The Aviator, Best Film. |
| February | 26 | Catwoman and Fahrenheit 9/11 dominate the Golden Raspberry Awards, walking away with 4 awards each, even though the latter wasn't nominated for worst picture. Four special awards were also handed out to commemorate the Razzies' 25th anniversary. Arnold Schwarzenegger was named the biggest loser of the previous 25 years, Battlefield Earth, Gigli, and From Justin to Kelly collected the worst film awards. |
| February | 27 | 77th Academy Awards: Million Dollar Baby wins the awards for Best Picture and Best Director. |
| March | 13 | 10th Empire Awards: The Bourne Supremacy wins the awards for Best Film and Best Actor for Matt Damon. |
| May | 19 | Star Wars: Episode III – Revenge of the Sith reaches a record high at the box offices on opening day with US$50 million on 9,400 screens at 3,661 theaters worldwide, edging out Spider-Man 2's top opening day record of $40.4 million and Shrek 2's top single day record of $44.8 million. |
| May | 22 | The Golden Palm in the 58th Edition of the Cannes Film Festival is awarded to L'enfant, directed by Jean-Pierre and Luc Dardenne. The Grand Prix is awarded to Broken Flowers by Jim Jarmusch, while the prize for best director is awarded to Michael Haneke for Caché. |
| June | 4 | The 2005 MTV Movie Awards winners were announced. |
| June | 15 | After an 8-year absence from cinema screens, the Batman films are rebooted with Batman Begins, directed by Christopher Nolan and starring Christian Bale as Batman. |
| June | 21 | The American Film Institute holds its 100 Years...100 Movie Quotes. The greatest film quote is "Frankly, my dear, I don't give a damn" from Gone with the Wind. |
| August | 11 | Roger Ebert publishes the list of his most hated films, distilled down from reviews he has written which date back to the 1960s. The list includes 2005 releases such as Constantine, Deuce Bigalow: European Gigolo and A Lot like Love. |
| September | 2 | The highly acclaimed Brokeback Mountain premieres at the 62nd Venice International Film Festival. |
| October | 14 | It is announced that Daniel Craig will be the new James Bond in the forthcoming Casino Royale. |
| December | 11 | The American Film Institute gives its picks for the ten most outstanding motion pictures of 2005, which are Brokeback Mountain, Capote, Crash, The 40-Year-Old Virgin, Good Night, and Good Luck, A History of Violence, King Kong, Munich, The Squid and the Whale and Syriana. |
| December | 13 | The Hollywood Foreign Press Association nominations for the Golden Globe Awards included Brokeback Mountain, The Constant Gardener, Good Night, and Good Luck, A History of Violence and Match Point for best drama film. |
| December | 13 | King Kong, starring Naomi Watts, Jack Black, and Adrien Brody, is theatrically released. It later went on to gross $556 million worldwide and become the fifth highest-grossing movie of the year. |

== Awards ==
| Category/Organization | 11th Critics' Choice Awards January 9, 2006 | 63rd Golden Globe Awards January 16, 2006 | | Producers, Directors, Screen Actors, and Writers Guild Awards | 59th BAFTA Awards February 19, 2006 | 78th Academy Awards March 5, 2006 |
| Category/Organization | 11th Critics' Choice Awards January 9, 2006 | Drama | Musical or Comedy | Producers, Directors, Screen Actors, and Writers Guild Awards | 59th BAFTA Awards February 19, 2006 | 78th Academy Awards March 5, 2006 |
|---|---|---|---|---|---|---|
| Best Film | Brokeback Mountain | | Walk the Line | Brokeback Mountain | | Crash |
| Best Director | Ang Lee; Brokeback Mountain | | | | | |
| Best Actor | Philip Seymour Hoffman; Capote | | Joaquin Phoenix; Walk the Line | Philip Seymour Hoffman; Capote | | |
| Best Actress | Reese Witherspoon; Walk the Line | Felicity Huffman; Transamerica | Reese Witherspoon; Walk the Line | | | |
| Best Supporting Actor | Paul Giamatti; Cinderella Man | George Clooney; Syriana | | Paul Giamatti; Cinderella Man | Jake Gyllenhaal; Brokeback Mountain | George Clooney; Syriana |
| Best Supporting Actress | Amy Adams; Junebug; Michelle Williams; Brokeback Mountain | Rachel Weisz; The Constant Gardener | | | Thandiwe Newton; Crash | Rachel Weisz; The Constant Gardener |
| Best Screenplay, Adapted | Paul Haggis and Robert Moresco; Crash | Larry McMurtry and Diana Ossana; Brokeback Mountain | | Larry McMurtry and Diana Ossana; Brokeback Mountain | | |
| Best Screenplay, Original | Paul Haggis and Robert Moresco; Crash | Larry McMurtry and Diana Ossana; Brokeback Mountain | | Paul Haggis and Robert Moresco; Crash | | |
| Best Animated Film | Wallace & Gromit: The Curse of the Were-Rabbit | N/A | N/A | Wallace & Gromit: The Curse of the Were-Rabbit | N/A | Wallace & Gromit: The Curse of the Were-Rabbit |
| Best Original Score | Memoirs of a Geisha; John Williams | | | N/A | Memoirs of a Geisha; John Williams | Brokeback Mountain; Gustavo Santaolalla |
| Best Original Song | "Hustle & Flow (It Ain't Over)"; Hustle & Flow | "A Love That Will Never Grow Old"; Brokeback Mountain | | N/A | N/A | "It's Hard out Here for a Pimp"; Hustle & Flow |
| Best Foreign Language Film | Kung Fu Hustle | Paradise Now | | N/A | The Beat That My Heart Skipped | Tsotsi |
| Best Documentary | March of the Penguins | N/A | N/A | N/A | N/A | March of the Penguins |

Palme d'Or (58th Cannes Film Festival):

L'Enfant, directed by Jean-Pierre and Luc Dardenne, Belgium

Golden Lion (62nd Venice International Film Festival):

Brokeback Mountain, directed by Ang Lee, Taiwan

Golden Bear (55th Berlin International Film Festival):

U-Carmen eKhayelitsha, directed by Mark Dornford-May, South Africa

== 2005 films ==
=== By country/region ===
- List of American films of 2005
- List of Argentine films of 2005
- List of Australian films of 2005
- List of Bangladeshi films of 2005
- List of Brazilian films of 2005
- List of British films of 2005
- List of Chinese films of 2005
- List of Canadian films of 2005
- List of Dutch films of 2005
- List of French films of 2005
- List of German films of the 2000s
- List of Hong Kong films of 2005
- List of Indian films of 2005
  - List of Bengali films of 2005
  - List of Bollywood films of 2005
  - List of Kannada films of 2005
  - List of Malayalam films of 2005
  - List of Tamil films of 2005
  - List of Telugu films of 2005
- List of Italian films of 2005
- List of Japanese films of 2005
- List of Mexican films of 2005
- List of Pakistani films of 2005
- List of Russian films of 2005
- List of South Korean films of 2005
- List of Spanish films of 2005

=== By genre/medium ===
- List of action films of 2005
- List of animated feature films of 2005
- List of avant-garde films of 2005
- List of crime films of 2005
- List of comedy films of 2005
- List of drama films of 2005
- List of horror films of 2005
- List of science fiction films of 2005
- List of thriller films of 2005
- List of western films of 2005

== Births ==
- January 4 – Dafne Keen, Spanish-English actress
- January 11 – Teo Briones, American actor and musician
- January 25 – Avantika Vandanapu, American actress
- February 23 – Arica Himmel, American actress
- February 25 – Noah Jupe, English actor
- March 3 – Miles Caton, American musician and actor
- March 14 – Oscar Curtis, British actor
- April 5 – Bleu Landau, English actor
- April 13 – Brandon Severs, American actor
- April 29 – Shahadi Wright Joseph, American actress, singer and dancer
- May 3 – Maxwell Jenkins, American actor
- May 19 – Jack Gore, American actor
- May 13 – Tristan Pravong, American actor
- June 6 – Soma Santoki, Japanese actor
- June 18 – Kane Parsons, American YouTuber, filmmaker, VFX artist and musician
- July 20 – Alison Fernandez, American actress
- July 25 – Pierce Gagnon, American actor
- August 10 – Sunny Suljic, American actor
- August 18 – Brady Hepner, American actor
- August 30 – Sophia Valverde, Brazilian actress
- September 20 – Jason Drucker, American actor
- October 1 – Rosalie Chiang, American actress
- October 7 – Lulu Wilson, American actress
- October 31 – Dixie Egerickx, English actress
- November 18 – Lia McHugh, American actress
- December 16 – Owen Vaccaro, American actor
- December 30 – Brady Noon, American actor
- Joseph Zada, Australian actor

== Deaths ==
| Month | Date | Name | Age | Country | Profession | Notable films |
|---|---|---|---|---|---|---|
| January | 2 | C. M. Pennington-Richards | 93 | UK | Producer | A Challenge for Robin Hood; Dentist on the Job |
| January | 5 | Gabrielle Daye | 93 | UK | Actress | Chitty Chitty Bang Bang; 10 Rillington Place |
| January | 8 | Badja Djola | 56 | US | Actor | Mississippi Burning; Who's the Man? |
| January | 9 | Gonzalo Gavira | 79 | Mexico | Sound Engineer | The Exorcist; The Towering Inferno |
| January | 10 | Erwin Hillier | 93 | Germany | Cinematographer | The Dam Busters; Eye of the Devil |
| January | 11 | Thelma White | 94 | US | Actress | Reefer Madness; The Moon's Our Home |
| January | 12 | Amrish Puri | 72 | India | Actor | Indiana Jones and the Temple of Doom; Gandhi |
| January | 15 | Dan Lee | 35 | Canada | Animator | Finding Nemo; A Bug's Life |
| January | 15 | Ruth Warrick | 88 | US | Actress | Citizen Kane; China Sky |
| January | 17 | Virginia Mayo | 84 | US | Actress | White Heat; The Best Years of Our Lives |
| January | 21 | Steve Susskind | 62 | US | Actor | Monsters, Inc.; Star Trek V: The Final Frontier |
| January | 22 | Patsy Rowlands | 74 | UK | Actress | Tom Jones; A Stitch in Time |
| January | 26 | Josie MacAvin | 85–86 | Ireland | Set Decorator | Out of Africa; Far and Away |
| February | 1 | John Vernon | 72 | Canada | Actor | Dirty Harry; Animal House |
| February | 2 | Goffredo Lombardo | 84 | Italy | Producer | The Leopard; Rocco and His Brothers |
| February | 4 | Ossie Davis | 87 | US | Actor, Director | Do the Right Thing; I'm Not Rappaport |
| February | 10 | Arthur Miller | 89 | US | Screenwriter | The Crucible; The Misfits |
| February | 10 | Leonard Trolley | 87 | UK | Actor | The Message; One of Our Dinosaurs Is Missing |
| February | 12 | Brian Kelly | 73 | US | Actor, Producer | Around the World Under the Sea; Blade Runner |
| February | 13 | Harry Baird | 73 | Guyana | Actor | The Italian Job; The Count of Monte Cristo |
| February | 14 | Otto Plaschkes | 75 | Austria | Producer | Georgy Girl; Hopscotch |
| February | 16 | Nicole DeHuff | 30 | US | Actress | Meet the Parents; Suspect Zero |
| February | 17 | Peter Foy | 79 | UK | Special Effects Artist | The Wiz; Fantastic Voyage |
| February | 17 | Dan O'Herlihy | 85 | Ireland | Actor | RoboCop; Fail Safe |
| February | 20 | Sandra Dee | 62 | US | Actress | Gidget; Imitation of Life |
| February | 22 | Simone Simon | 94 | France | Actress | Seventh Heaven; Cat People |
| March | 3 | Guylaine St-Onge | 39 | Canada | Actress | Angel Eyes; Highwaymen |
| March | 5 | Morris Engel | 84 | US | Director, Screenwriter, Cinematographer | Little Fugitive; Weddings and Babies |
| March | 6 | Teresa Wright | 86 | US | Actress | The Pride of the Yankees; Mrs. Miniver |
| March | 7 | John Box | 85 | UK | Production Designer, Art Director | Lawrence of Arabia; Doctor Zhivago |
| March | 7 | Debra Hill | 54 | US | Screenwriter, Producer | Halloween; The Fog |
| March | 9 | Sheila Gish | 62 | UK | Actress | Highlander; Mansfield Par |
| March | 13 | Jason Evers | 83 | US | Actor | The Brain That Wouldn't Die; Escape from the Planet of the Apes |
| March | 20 | Armand Lohikoski | 93 | Finland | Director | Pekka Puupää |
| March | 21 | Gemini Ganesan | 84 | India | Actor | Devta; Rudraveena |
| March | 21 | Barney Martin | 82 | US | Actor | Arthur; The Producers |
| March | 25 | Paul Henning | 93 | US | Screenwriter | Lover Come Back; Bedtime Story |
| March | 29 | Mitch Hedberg | 37 | US | Actor, Comedian | Almost Famous; Lords of Dogtown |
| April | 5 | Debralee Scott | 52 | US | Actress | American Graffiti; Police Academy |
| April | 8 | Onna White | 83 | Canada | Choreographer | The Music Man; Oliver! |
| April | 11 | John Bennett | 76 | UK | Actor | Minority Report; The Pianist |
| April | 15 | Margaretta Scott | 93 | UK | Actress | The Man from Morocco; Calling Paul Temple |
| April | 16 | Kay Walsh | 94 | UK | Actress | The Horse's Mouth; Oliver Twist |
| April | 19 | George P. Cosmatos | 64 | Italy | Director | Tombstone; Rambo: First Blood Part II |
| April | 19 | Ruth Hussey | 90 | US | Actress | The Philadelphia Story; The Great Gatsby |
| April | 22 | Norman Bird | 80 | UK | Actor | The League of Gentlemen; Omen III: The Final Conflict |
| April | 23 | Robert Farnon | 87 | Canada | Composer | Captain Horatio Hornblower; The Road to Hong Kong |
| April | 23 | John Mills | 97 | UK | Actor | Ryan's Daughter; Great Expectations |
| April | 26 | Mason Adams | 86 | US | Actor | Toy Soldiers; F/X |
| April | 26 | Michael Coles | 68 | UK | Actor | Dr. Who and the Daleks; Sweeney! |
| April | 26 | Maria Schell | 79 | Austria | Actress | Superman; Cimarron |
| April | 26 | Robert Schiffer | 88 | US | Makeup Artist | The Wizard of Oz; Splash |
| May | 4 | Edward McAvoy | 55 | US | Production Designer | Office Space; Wild Things |
| May | 5 | Elisabeth Fraser | 85 | US | Actress | A Patch of Blue; All My Sons |
| May | 5 | June MacCloy | 95 | US | Actress | June Moon; Go West |
| May | 16 | Joe Grant | 96 | US | Animator, Screenwriter | Mulan; Dumbo |
| May | 16 | June Lang | 88 | US | Actress | Bonnie Scotland; International Settlement |
| May | 17 | Frank Gorshin | 72 | US | Actor | Batman; 12 Monkeys |
| May | 19 | Henry Corden | 85 | Canada | Actor | Modern Problems; Hook, Line & Sinker |
| May | 20 | J. D. Cannon | 83 | US | Actor | Cool Hand Luke; Death Wish II |
| May | 21 | Stephen Elliott | 86 | US | Actor | Beverly Hills Cop; Arthur |
| May | 21 | Howard Morris | 85 | US | Actor, Director | High Anxiety; Boys' Night Out |
| May | 22 | Thurl Ravenscroft | 91 | US | Singer, Voice Actor | The Aristocats; The Brave Little Toaster |
| May | 25 | Graham Kennedy | 71 | Australia | Actor | The Odd Angry Shot; The Club |
| May | 25 | Ismail Merchant | 68 | India | Producer | A Room with a View; Howards End |
| May | 26 | Eddie Albert | 99 | US | Actor | The Heartbreak Kid; The Longest Yard |
| June | 1 | Fernando Ghia | 69 | Italy | Producer | The Mission; Lady Caroline Lamb |
| June | 1 | Geoffrey Toone | 94 | Ireland | Actor | The King and I; Zero Hour! |
| June | 2 | Vittorio Duse | 89 | Italy | Actor, Director, Screenwriter | The Godfather Part III; The Leopard |
| June | 3 | Leon Askin | 97 | Austria | Actor | One, Two, Three; Road to Bali |
| June | 3 | Michael Billington | 63 | UK | Actor | The Spy Who Loved Me; Alfred the Great |
| June | 3 | Harrison Young | 75 | US | Actor | Saving Private Ryan; The Game |
| June | 4 | Lorna Thayer | 86 | US | Actor | Five Easy Pieces; Frankie and Johnny |
| June | 6 | Anne Bancroft | 73 | US | Actress | The Graduate; The Miracle Worker |
| June | 6 | Dana Elcar | 77 | US | Actor | The Sting; Buddy Buddy |
| June | 8 | Ed Bishop | 72 | US | Actor | 2001: A Space Odyssey; The Mouse on the Moon |
| June | 11 | Lon McCallister | 82 | US | Actor | That Other Woman; The Story of Seabiscuit |
| June | 11 | Ron Randell | 86 | Australia | Actor | The Longest Day; King of Kings |
| June | 13 | Jonathan Adams | 69 | UK | Actor | The Rocky Horror Picture Show; Eskimo Nell |
| June | 13 | Lane Smith | 69 | US | Actor | My Cousin Vinny; Network |
| June | 15 | Suzanne Flon | 87 | France | Actress | Moulin Rouge; The Train |
| June | 24 | Paul Winchell | 82 | US | Actor | Which Way to the Front?; The Fox and the Hound |
| June | 25 | John Fiedler | 80 | US | Actor | 12 Angry Men; The Odd Couple |
| June | 29 | Bruce Malmuth | 71 | US | Director, Actor | Nighthawks; Hard to Kill |
| July | 2 | Ernest Lehman | 89 | US | Screenwriter | North by Northwest; The Sound of Music |
| July | 3 | Alberto Lattuada | 90 | Italy | Director | Stay as You Are; The Mandrake |
| July | 3 | Charles Okun | 80 | US | Producer | The Accidental Tourist; Silverado |
| July | 4 | June Haver | 79 | US | Actress, Singer | The Dolly Sisters; The Daughter of Rosie O'Grady |
| July | 7 | Jocelyn Rickards | 80 | Australia | Costume Designer | Blowup; From Russia with Love |
| July | 10 | Freddy Soto | 35 | US | Actor, Comedian | Spanglish; Pauly Shore Is Dead |
| July | 11 | Frances Langford | 92 | US | Singer, Actress | Yankee Doodle Dandy; The Glenn Miller Story |
| July | 17 | Geraldine Fitzgerald | 91 | Ireland | Actress | Wuthering Heights; Arthur |
| July | 17 | Gavin Lambert | 80 | UK | Screenwriter | Inside Daisy Clover; I Never Promised You a Rose Garden |
| July | 19 | Edward Bunker | 71 | US | Actor, Screenwriter | Reservoir Dogs; Tango & Cash |
| July | 20 | James Doohan | 85 | Canada | Actor | Star Trek; Man in the Wilderness |
| July | 22 | George D. Wallace | 88 | US | Actor | Forbidden Planet; Bicentennial Man |
| July | 25 | Alf Joint | 77 | UK | Stuntman, Actor | Return of the Jedi; Goldfinger |
| July | 25 | Ford Rainey | 96 | US | Actor | White Heat; The Sand Pebbles |
| July | 25 | David Jackson | 71 | UK | Actor | 10 Rillington Place; Killer's Moon |
| July | 26 | Alexander Golitzen | 87 | Russia | Art Director, Production Designer | To Kill a Mockingbird; Spartacus |
| July | 29 | Pat McCormick | 78 | US | Actor | Smokey and the Bandit; A Wedding |
| August | 1 | Donald Brooks | 77 | US | Costume Designer | The Cardinal; Star! |
| August | 4 | Ileen Getz | 43 | US | Actress | Changing Lanes; Celebrity |
| August | 8 | Barbara Bel Geddes | 82 | US | Actress | Vertigo; Panic in the Streets |
| August | 9 | Dorris Bowdon | 90 | US | Actress | The Grapes of Wrath; Drums Along the Mohawk |
| August | 9 | Stanley DeSantis | 51 | US | Actor | The Aviator; I Am Sam |
| August | 9 | Matthew McGrory | 32 | US | Actor | Big Fish; The Devil's Rejects |
| August | 11 | James Booth | 77 | UK | Actor | Zulu; The Secret of My Success |
| August | 15 | Herta Ware | 88 | US | Actress | Cocoon; Cruel Intentions |
| August | 16 | Tonino Delli Colli | 81 | Italy | Cinematographer | Life Is Beautiful; Once Upon a Time in America |
| August | 16 | Joe Ranft | 45 | US | Animator, Voice Actor, Screenwriter | Toy Story; A Bug's Life |
| August | 16 | Eva Renzi | 60 | Germany | Actress | Funeral in Berlin; The Pink Jungle |
| August | 19 | Mel Welles | 81 | US | Actor | The Little Shop of Horrors; Dr. Heckyl and Mr. Hype |
| August | 23 | Brock Peters | 78 | US | Actor | To Kill a Mockingbird; Star Trek IV: The Voyage Home |
| August | 25 | Terence Morgan | 83 | UK | Actor | Hamlet; Captain Horatio Hornblower |
| August | 31 | Michael Sheard | 67 | UK | Actor | The Empire Strikes Back; Indiana Jones and the Last Crusade |
| September | 2 | Bob Denver | 70 | US | Actor | Take Her, She's Mine; Who's Minding the Mint? |
| September | 4 | Lloyd Avery II | 36 | US | Actor | Boyz n the Hood; Poetic Justice |
| September | 12 | Ronald Leigh-Hunt | 84 | UK | Actor | The Omen; Where the Bullets Fly |
| September | 14 | Robert Wise | 91 | US | Director, Film Editor | The Sound of Music; West Side Story |
| September | 15 | Guy Green | 91 | UK | Director, Cinematographer | A Patch of Blue; Great Expectations |
| September | 15 | Josephine Griffin | 76 | UK | Actress | The Man Who Never Was; The Spanish Gardener |
| September | 15 | Sidney Luft | 89 | US | Producer | A Star is Born; Kilroy Was Here |
| September | 16 | Constance Moore | 84 | US | Actress | Atlantic City; Buck Rogers |
| September | 17 | Joel Hirschhorn | 67 | US | Songwriter | The Poseidon Adventure; Pete's Dragon |
| September | 19 | John Bromfield | 83 | US | Actor | Revenge of the Creature; Hot Cars |
| September | 20 | Gordon Carroll | 77 | US | Producer | Alien; Red Heat |
| September | 22 | Joseph Wolf | 78 | US | Producer | A Nightmare on Elm Street; Halloween II |
| September | 23 | John Brabourne | 80 | UK | Producer | Romeo and Juliet; A Passage to India |
| September | 23 | Roger Brierley | 70 | UK | Actor | About a Boy; A Fish Called Wanda |
| September | 25 | Don Adams | 82 | US | Actor | The Nude Bomb; Back to the Beach |
| September | 25 | Jerry Juhl | 67 | US | Screenwriter | The Muppet Movie; The Muppet Christmas Carol |
| October | 2 | Hamilton Camp | 70 | UK | Actor | Heaven Can Wait; Joe Dirt |
| October | 2 | Nipsey Russell | 87 | US | Actor | The Wiz; Car 54, Where Are You? |
| October | 3 | Ronnie Barker | 76 | UK | Actor, Screenwriter | Robin and Marian; The Gathering Storm |
| October | 3 | Louis A. Garfinkle | 77 | US | Screenwriter | The Deer Hunter; I Bury the Living |
| October | 7 | Charles Rocket | 56 | US | Actor | Dumb and Dumber; Dances with Wolves |
| October | 9 | Louis Nye | 92 | US | Actor | The Facts of Life; Good Neighbor Sam |
| October | 11 | Sergio Citti | 72 | Italy | Director, Screenwriter | Beach House; We Free Kings |
| October | 15 | Mildred Shay | 94 | US | Actress | Candleshoe; Death Wish 3 |
| October | 16 | Ursula Howells | 83 | UK | Actress | Dr. Terror's House of Horrors; Torture Garden |
| October | 16 | John Larch | 91 | US | Actor | Dirty Harry; Play Misty for Me |
| October | 18 | John Hollis | 77 | UK | Actor | The Empire Strikes Back; Superman |
| October | 19 | Wolf Rilla | 85 | Germany | Director, Screenwriter | Village of the Damned; The Scamp |
| October | 22 | Tony Adams | 52 | Ireland | Producer | 10; Victor/Victoria |
| October | 23 | William Hootkins | 57 | US | Actor | Star Wars; Batman |
| October | 28 | Barbara Keogh | 76 | UK | Actress | The Abominable Dr. Phibes; Paperhouse |
| October | 29 | Lloyd Bochner | 81 | Canada | Actor | Point Blank; The Detective |
| November | 2 | Jean Carson | 82 | US | Actress | I Married a Monster from Outer Space; The Party |
| November | 3 | Geoffrey Keen | 89 | UK | Actor | Doctor Zhivago; The Spy Who Loved Me |
| November | 4 | Sheree North | 85 | US | Actress | How to Be Very, Very Popular; Charley Varrick |
| November | 6 | Stevan Larner | 75 | US | Cinematographer | Badlands; Caddyshack |
| November | 11 | Moustapha Akkad | 75 | Syria | Producer, Director | The Message; Halloween |
| November | 11 | Keith Andes | 89 | US | Actor | A Life at Stake; Tora! Tora! Tora! |
| November | 11 | Pamela Duncan | 80 | US | Actress | My Gun Is Quick; Attack of the Crab Monsters |
| November | 15 | Agenore Incrocci | 86 | Italy | Screenwriter | The Good, the Bad and the Ugly; Casanova 70 |
| November | 18 | Harold J. Stone | 94 | US | Actor | The Harder They Fall; The Wrong Man |
| November | 20 | Nora Denney | 78 | US | Actress | Willy Wonka & the Chocolate Factory; Splash |
| November | 23 | Constance Cummings | 95 | US | Actress | Blithe Spirit; Glamour |
| November | 23 | Beverly Tyler | 78 | US | Actress | The Green Years; Chicago Confidential |
| November | 24 | Pat Morita | 73 | US | Actor | The Karate Kid; Mulan |
| November | 27 | Jocelyn Brando | 86 | US | Actress | China Venture; Ten Wanted Men |
| November | 27 | Marc Lawrence | 95 | US | Actor | The Asphalt Jungle; Key Largo |
| November | 29 | Joseph Fürst | 89 | Austria | Actor | Diamonds Are Forever; Exodus |
| November | 29 | Macon McCalman | 72 | US | Actor | Smokey and the Bandit; The Client |
| November | 29 | Wendie Jo Sperber | 47 | US | Actress | Back to the Future; I Wanna Hold Your Hand |
| November | 30 | Jean Parker | 90 | US | Actress | The Gunfighter; Black Tuesday |
| November | 30 | Herbert L. Strock | 87 | US | Director | I Was a Teenage Frankenstein; The Crawling Hand |
| December | 1 | Jack Colvin | 71 | US | Actor | Jeremiah Johnson; Child's Play |
| December | 4 | Gregg Hoffman | 42 | US | Producer | Saw; Dead Silence |
| December | 7 | Adrian Biddle | 53 | UK | Cinematographer | Aliens; Thelma & Louise |
| December | 10 | Mary Jackson | 95 | US | Actress | Airport; The Exorcist III |
| December | 10 | Richard Pryor | 65 | US | Actor, Comedian | The Mack; Silver Streak |
| December | 12 | Robert Newmyer | 49 | US | Producer | Training Day; The Santa Clause |
| December | 12 | Annette Stroyberg | 69 | Denmark | Actress | Les Liaisons dangereuses; Blood and Roses |
| December | 15 | Giuseppe Patroni Griffi | 84 | Italy | Director | The Divine Nymph; The Driver's Seat |
| December | 16 | John Spencer | 58 | US | Actor | Cop Land; Presumed Innocent |
| December | 18 | Belita | 82 | UK | Actress | Suspense; Never Let Me Go |
| December | 19 | Don McKillop | 77 | UK | Actor | Otley; An American Werewolf in London |
| December | 20 | Argentina Brunetti | 98 | Argentina | Actress | It's a Wonderful Life; The Money Trap |
| December | 22 | Aurora Miranda | 90 | Brazil | Singer, Actress | Phantom Lady; The Three Caballeros |
| December | 25 | Roy Stuart | 78 | US | Actor | The Love God?; Prime Risk |
| December | 26 | Vincent Schiavelli | 57 | US | Actor | One Flew Over the Cuckoo's Nest; Ghost |
| December | 28 | Patrick Cranshaw | 86 | US | Actor | Bonnie and Clyde; Old School |

== Film debuts ==
- Will Adamsdale – Stoned
- Naidra Ayadi – Zim and Co.
- Javier Botet – Beneath Still Waters
- Nicholas Braun – Sky High
- Jesús Carroza – 7 Virgins
- Michael Chernus – Winter Passing
- François Civil – Le Cactus
- Jan Cornet – The Night of the Brother
- Alexandra Daddario – The Squid and the Whale
- Lars Eidinger – See You at Regis Debray
- Déborah François – The Child
- Troy Gentile – Bad News Bears
- Domhnall Gleeson – Boy Eats Girl
- Tiffany Haddish – The Urban Demographic
- Ryan Hansen – Death by Engagement
- Glenn Howerton – Must Love Dogs
- Jack Huston – Neighborhood Watch
- Curtis "50 Cent" Jackson – Get Rich or Die Tryin'
- Gillian Jacobs – Building Girl
- Yuu Kashii – Linda Linda Linda
- Skandar Keynes – The Chronicles of Narnia: The Lion, the Witch and the Wardrobe
- Olga Kurylenko – The Ring Finger
- Rooney Mara – Urban Legends: Bloody Mary
- Wendi McLendon-Covey – Bewitched
- Tamzin Merchant – Pride & Prejudice
- Anisur Rahman Milon – Hajar Bachhor Dhore
- Chloë Grace Moretz – The Amityville Horror
- Carey Mulligan – Pride & Prejudice
- Lee Pace – The White Countess
- Teresa Palmer – Wolf Creek
- Randall Park – Will Unplugged
- Pedro Pascal – Sisters
- Robert Pattinson – Harry Potter and the Goblet of Fire
- Tyler Perry – Diary of a Mad Black Woman
- Jackson Rathbone – River's End
- AnnaSophia Robb – Because of Winn-Dixie
- Elisabeth Röhm – Miss Congeniality 2: Armed and Fabulous
- Amy Seimetz – Black Dragon Canyon
- Brittany Snow – The Pacifier
- Paul Sparks – Headspace
- Corey Stoll – North Country
- Channing Tatum – Coach Carter
- Justin Timberlake – Edison
- Addison Timlin – Derailed
- Christa Théret – The Axe
- Jess Weixler – Little Manhattan
- Ben Whitehead – Wallace & Gromit: The Curse of the Were-Rabbit
- Mary Elizabeth Winstead – The Ring Two
- Alex Wolff – The Naked Brothers Band: The Movie
- Nat Wolff – The Naked Brothers Band: The Movie
