= Cluett =

Cluett is a surname of English origin.

== People with the surname ==
- David Cluett (1965–2005), Maltese footballer
- E. Harold Cluett (1874–1954), a member of the United States House of Representatives
- Frances Cluett (1883–1969), a Canadian nurse and educator
- Sanford Lockwood Cluett (1874–1968), an American engineer, inventor, and businessman
- Shelagh Cluett (1947–2007), British sculptor
