= Ivan Komarov =

Ivan Komarov may refer to:

- Ivan Komarov (fencer) (1921–2005), Soviet fencer
- Ivan Komarov (footballer) (born 2003), Russian football player
