= Oun =

Oun or OUN may refer to

== People ==
- Ahmed Oun (born c. 1946), Libyan Army major general
- Ek Yi Oun (1910–2013), Cambodian politician
- Kham-Oun I (1885–1915), Lao queen consort by marriage to king Sisavang Vong
- Õun, an Estonian surname
- Oun Kham (1811–1895), Lao king of Luang Prabang
- Oun Yao-ling (born 1940), Taiwanese weightlifter and Olympics competitor
- Samsenethai (a.k.a. Oun Huan; 1357–1416), Lao king of Lan Xang

== Other ==
- Organisation of Ukrainian Nationalists
- University of Oklahoma Westheimer Airport, IATA code OUN
