= Udo Querch =

Austrian weightlifter

Personal information
- Nationality: Austrian
- Born: 16 June 1941 (age 83)

Sport
- Sport: Weightlifting

Udo Querch (born 16 June 1941) is an Austrian weightlifter. He competed in the men's heavyweight event at the 1964 Summer Olympics.
