= Fernando Walls =

Mexican chemist and sport shooter

Personal information
- Born: 6 February 1931
- Died: 25 April 2005 (aged 74)

Sport
- Sport: Sports shooting

Fernando Walls (6 February 1931 – 28 April 2005) was a Mexican chemist and sports shooter. He competed at the 1972 Summer Olympics and the 1976 Summer Olympics.
