= Oun Yao-ling =

Taiwanese weightlifter (born 1940)

Personal information
- Native name: 項耀林
- Nationality: Taiwanese
- Born: 11 February 1940 (age 86) Germany
- Education: Stuttgart Technology University of Applied Sciences

Sport
- Sport: Weightlifting

Oun Yao-ling (traditional Chinese: 項耀林; simplified Chinese: 项耀林; pinyin: Xiàng Yàolín; born 11 February 1940), also known as Günter Wu, is a Taiwanese weightlifter. He competed in the men's heavyweight event at the 1964 Summer Olympics, where he placed 14th. Born and raised in Germany, Oun visited Taiwan for the first time at the age of 24 to train for the Olympics as a member of the Taiwanese team. He set three national records at the 18th World Games in 1965.

== Biography ==
Oun Yao-ling was born in Germany. He is also known as Günter Wu. His father, Oun Ting-zhai (Chinese: 項廷齋), is from Zhejiang's Qingtian County, while his mother is from Germany. Oun has four sisters. The family initially operated a large perfume store in East Germany but escaped to West Germany after the communist government seized the business. The family left their house, cars, and most of their belongings in East Germany, taking only a few things with them. The family began running the Chinese restaurant Nanjing Restaurant (南京酒樓) in Braunschweig. While studying textile chemistry at the Stuttgart Technology University of Applied Sciences, Oun assisted at the restaurant during holiday breaks. He graduated from the university in 1964.

Oun began weightlifting in 1959 and learned from the West German weightlifter Moller (摩勒). He initially could lift a little above 170 kilograms (370 lb). In May 1963, he lifted 412.5 kilograms (909 lb), breaking the West German record. Oun became the German champion in the heavyweight division after lifting a total of 440 kilograms (970 lb) in three lifts. Although the German Weightlifting Association (德國舉重協會) recommended that he obtain German citizenship and compete on the German national team at the Olympics, he kept rejecting the offer. He was living in Germany in 1963. Around that year, he sent a letter to Yang Sen, the president of the Republic of China Sports Federation, offering to compete for Taiwan at the 1964 Summer Olympics. Huang Chi-lu, the Minister of Education, met Oun on a visit to Germany. According to Huang, Oun told Huang that he had to consume either beans or two pounds of meat daily. Huang asked him what the monthly cost of this diet was, and Oun responded it was 200 German marks. Huang approved that Oun would get a monthly public allowance of 500 marks. Referring to Chen Cheng, Huang said, "I have told Vice President Chen about this, and he agrees very much." Huang said he hoped Oun would compete in the Olympics for Taiwan which would cover his airfare.

On 1 August 1964, Yang Sen's committee approved Oun to compete for Taiwan in the 1964 Summer Olympics in the heavyweight weightlifting event. Oun flew to Taipei on 29 October 1964 to train for the Olympics. It was his first time in Taiwan. His cousin, brother-in-law, and six nephews, who lived in Taiwan, met him after he arrived at Songshan Airport. Oun could not speak Mandarin Chinese. He felt embarrassed during training sessions when—unable to understand the coach's instructions—he turned in a different, wrong direction from his teammates. Fellow weightlifter Yang Chuan-kwang began teaching him Mandarin. Oun competed in the men's heavyweight event at the Olympics. In the clean and press, he lifted 140 kilograms (310 lb) on his first try and 147.5 kilograms (325 lb) on his second try but failed to lift 150.5 kilograms (332 lb) on his third try. In the snatch, he lifted 135 kilograms (298 lb) on his first try, 140 kilograms (310 lb) on his second, and 145 kilograms (320 lb) on his third. In the clean and jerk, he lifted 162.5 kilograms (358 lb) on his first try and 167.5 kilograms (369 lb) on his second try. On his third try, he failed to lift 172.5 kilograms (380 lb). He placed 14th in the event with a total score of 460 kilograms (1,010 lb). When Oun returned to Taiwan after the Olympics, he and fellow Olympian Yang Chuan-kwang visited President Chiang Kai-shek and First Lady Soong Mei-ling at the Shilin Official Residence. Oun said of the meeting, "Being able to meet President Chiang and his wife is truly an invaluable experience during my return to the country. I am so excited and deeply moved today!"

At the 18th World Games (世運會) in 1965, Oun set three national records: a heavyweight snatch of 325.25 kilograms (717.1 lb), a heavyweight clean and jerk of 319.5 kilograms (704 lb), and a heavyweight total of 1,014 kilograms (2,235 lb).

In 1969, Oun was asked to compete in the South African Games, but the opportunity was rescinded once the organisers found out he was of Chinese origin and not white.
