= Tullia Magrini =

Italian anthropologist (1950–2005)

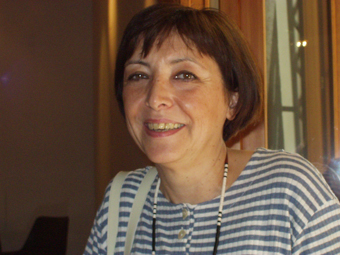
Tullia Magrini in 2004

Tullia Magrini (15 April 1950 – 24 July 2005) was an Italian anthropologist, an associate professor of Anthropology of Music at the University of Bologna.

Magrini did fieldwork in Italy, Greece, Bali and Madagascar. She served as Secretary General of the Società Italiana di Etnomusicologia (1982–86) and Chairperson of the ICTM Italian Committee (from 1986). She was founder in 1992 and chair since then of the ICTM Study Group, "Anthropology of Music in Mediterranean Cultures". In 1994 she founded the Web bulletin, "Italian Ethnomusicology," transformed in 1996 into the multimedia Web journal Music and Anthropology .

== Works ==
- Forme della musica vocale e strumentale cretese (1981)
- Canti d'amore e di sdegno: Funzioni e dinamiche psichiche della cultura orale (1986)
- Il Maggio drammatico: Una tradizione di teatro in musica (1992)
- Antropologia della musica e culture mediterranee (1993)
- Uomini e suoni: Prospettive antropologiche nella ricerca musicale (1995).

She contributed articles to The World of Music, Yearbook for Traditional Music, Ethnomusicology OnLine (EOL), MGG, and The New Grove Dictionary of Music and Musicians (forthcoming).

== Bibliography ==
- Philip V. Bohlman, Marcello Sorce Keller, and Loris Azzaroni (eds.), Musical Anthropology of the Mediterranean: Interpretation, Performance, Identity, Bologna, Edizioni Clueb – Cooperativa Libraria Universitaria Editrice, 2009.
- Marcello Sorce Keller, “Encomium. Tullia Magrini (1950–2005) – Her Scholarly Profile, Her Position in Italian Ethnomusicology”, in Philip V. Bohlman, Marcello Sorce Keller, and Loris Azzaroni (eds.), Musical Anthropology of the Mediterranean: Interpretation, Performance, Identity, Bologna, Edizioni Clueb – Cooperativa Libraria Universitaria Editrice, 2009, pp. 19–28.
