= Vellupillai Devadas =

Singaporean hockey player 1925–2005

Personal information
- Nationality: Singaporean
- Born: 11 February 1925 Seremban, British Malaya
- Died: 31 July 2005 (aged 80)

Sport
- Sport: Field hockey
- Club: Police Sports Association, Singapore

Vellupillai Devadas (11 February 1925 – 31 July 2005) was a Singaporean field hockey player. He competed in the men's tournament at the 1956 Summer Olympics.
