= Károly Ecser =

Hungarian weightlifter (1931–2005)

Personal information
- Born: 22 October 1931 Cegléd, Hungary
- Died: 6 April 2005 (aged 73) Cegléd, Hungary
- Height: 173 cm (5 ft 8 in)
- Weight: 113 kg (249 lb)

Sport
- Country: Hungary
- Sport: Weightlifting
- Weight class: +90 kg
- Club: Tatabányai SC, Tatabánya (HUN)
- Team: National team
Medal record
Men's Weightlifting
Representing Hungary
World Championships
| Bronze medal – third place | 1965 Tehran | +90 kg |
- Updated on 8 October 2016

Károly Ecser (22 October 1931 – 6 April 2005) was a Hungarian weightlifter who competed in the heavyweight class and represented Hungary at international competitions. He won the bronze medal at the 1965 World Weightlifting Championships in the +90 kg category. He participated at the 1964 Summer Olympics in the +90 kg event finishing fifth. Ecser had furthermore the following podium finishes at major championships: bronze in the 1965 World Championships Unlimited class (522.5 kg), bronze in the 1961 European Championships Unlimited class (455.0 kg) silver in the 1962 European Championships Unlimited class (482.5 kg), silver in the 1964 European Championships Unlimited class (490 kg) and gold at the 1965 European Championships Unlimited class (505 kg). He was born in Cegléd.
