= Jean Nelissen (footballer) =

Belgian footballer (1924–2005)

Personal information
- Date of birth: 3 June 1924
- Place of birth: Vroenhoven, Belgium
- Date of death: 6 July 2005 (aged 71)
- Place of death: Seraing, Belgium
- Position: Defender

Senior career*
Years	Team	Apps	(Gls)
1948	Bilzerse V.V.		
1948-1960	Verviétois		
1960-1961	Malmundaria		

International career
1957	Belgium	5	(0)
- * Club domestic league appearances and goals

Jean Nelissen (3 June 1924 – 6 July 2005) was a Belgian footballer who played as a defender, spending most of his career with C.S. Verviétois. He made five appearances for the Belgium national team in 1957.

== Life ==
Nelissen was born in Vroenhoven. He fought in the Piron Brigade during the World War II. Having joined C.S. Verviétois in 1946, he spent most of his football career with the club.
