= Anne Drungis =

American fencer

Personal information
- Born: October 11, 1930; Brooklyn, New York, United States
- Died: July 15, 2005 (aged 74); South River, New Jersey, United States

Sport
- Sport: Fencing

Anne Drungis (October 11, 1930 – July 15, 2005) was an American fencer. She competed in the women's team foil event at the 1964 Summer Olympics.
