= Donald L. Kimball =

American politician (1933–2005)

Donald L. Kimball (February 15, 1933 – April 4, 2005) was an American politician and newspaper editor.

== Personal life, education, and military career ==
Kimball was born on February 15, 1933, in Fairbank, Iowa, to parents Donald Keith Kimball and Katherine Finch. He grew up in Oelwein, and graduated from Stanley Consolidated School in Stanley in 1951. Kimball served three years in the United States Army, with two years experience as a paratrooper, retiring from active duty in January 1956. During his military service, Kimball was assigned to the 187th Airborne Infantry, 503rd Airborne Infantry, 11th Airborne Division, and 101st Airborne Division. He married Mary E. Moore in 1957, and graduated from Upper Iowa University in 1960. He died in Fayette on April 4, 2005.

== Political and media career ==
The same year that he graduated high school, Kimball began working for the Oelwein Reporter as a political columnist. He also became active in the Republican Party, and attended the 1952 Republican National Convention. Upon leaving the military, Kimball resumed his career in media, as publisher and editor of the Fayette County Leader and Maynard News. He was elected to two terms on the Iowa House of Representatives from 1957 to 1961, for District 71.
