= Weightlifting at the 1964 Summer Olympics – Men's +90 kg =

Weightlifting at the Olympics

Men's +90 kg at the Games of the XVIII Olympiad
- Venue: Shibuya Public Hall
- Date: 18 October 1964
- Competitors: 21 from 18 nations
- Winning total: 572.5 kg OR

Medalists
1st place, gold medalist(s)		Leonid Zhabotinsky	Soviet Union
2nd place, silver medalist(s)		Yury Vlasov	Soviet Union
3rd place, bronze medalist(s)		Norbert Schemansky	United States

The men's +90 kg weightlifting competitions at the 1964 Summer Olympics in Tokyo took place on 18 October at the Shibuya Public Hall. It was the tenth appearance of the heavyweight class.

== Results ==
Rank	Name	Country	kg
1	Leonid Zhabotinsky	Soviet Union	572.5
2	Yury Vlasov	Soviet Union	570.0
3	Norbert Schemansky	United States	537.5
4	Gary Gubner	United States	512.5
5	Károly Ecser	Hungary	507.5
6	Mohamed Mahmoud Ibrahim	Egypt	495.0
7	Ivan Veselinov	Bulgaria	490.0
8	Hwang Ho-dong	South Korea	482.5
9	Don Oliver	New Zealand	480.0
10	Serge Reding	Belgium	477.5
11	Manfred Rieger	United Team of Germany	475.0
12	Manuchehr Borumand	Iran	465.0
13	Arthur Shannos	Australia	465.0
14	Oun Yao-ling	Chinese Taipei	460.0
15	Ernesto Varona	Cuba	457.5
16	Abdul-Khaliq Jawad	Iraq	445.0
17	Humberto Selvetti	Argentina	445.0
18	Udo Querch	Austria	442.5
19	Hadi Abdul Jabbar	Iraq	440.0
20	Brandon Bailey	Trinidad and Tobago	425.0
AC	Eino Mäkinen	Finland	137.5
