= Shelagh Cluett =

British sculptor

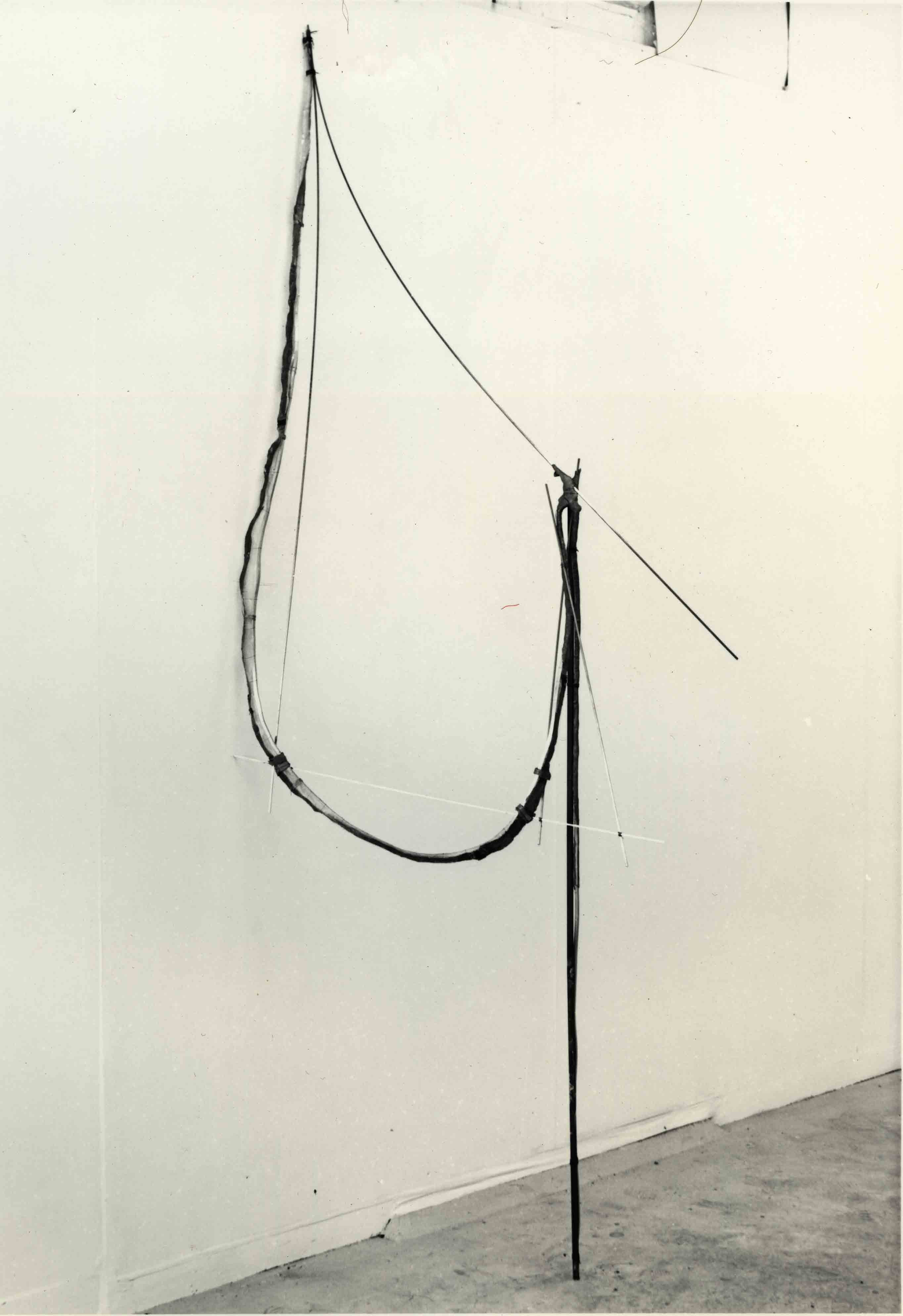
Flux 1, 1979. An early example of Shelagh Cluett's sculpture.

Shelagh Cluett (17 December 1947 – 25 July 2007) was an artist and fine art lecturer working in London, England, from the late 1960s until 2007. Cluett became a recognised figure on the London art scene in the early 1980s with exhibitions of her large metal sculptures appearing internationally. She worked at Chelsea School of Art and Design as a lecturer, and after 25 years, took up the position of Head of Postgraduate Studies in 2006.

== Early life and education ==
Cluett was born in Bournemouth, Hampshire (now Dorset), on 17 December 1947. She moved to London in 1968 as an undergraduate at Hornsey College of Art. In 1971, she went to Chelsea School of Art and Design to study on the postgraduate course.

== Early artistic career ==
Cluett's early artwork shows an interest in geological structures which remains traceable throughout her oeuvre. The landscape-like cross sections, seen in the images of her final show at Hornsey, quickly gave way to more resolutely abstract forms as her style progressed; tall sculptures inhabit their environs with strong lines, jumping and curving to and fro, as if enacting a complicated choreographed dance. Closer inspection reveals that these apparently weightless structures are in fact a complex combination of media. Wire, aluminium, wax, clay, wood and bitumen are systematically layered over each other creating a distinctly crafted effect, at odds with the overall appearance of the work. Accompanying her larger works are smaller 'thinking pieces', in which Cluett explored different colours, shapes, and ideas.

With shows at the Ikon Gallery in 1979, and then at Nicola Jacobs Gallery and ACME Gallery in 1980 Cluett became established on the British art scene, subsequently showing extensively in the UK and abroad. During this period she also forged strong links in the world of art education, acting as visiting lecturer and examiner to many different art schools up and down the country. She set up the postgraduate course in sculpture at Chelsea College of Art in 1980.

== The 1980s and '90s ==
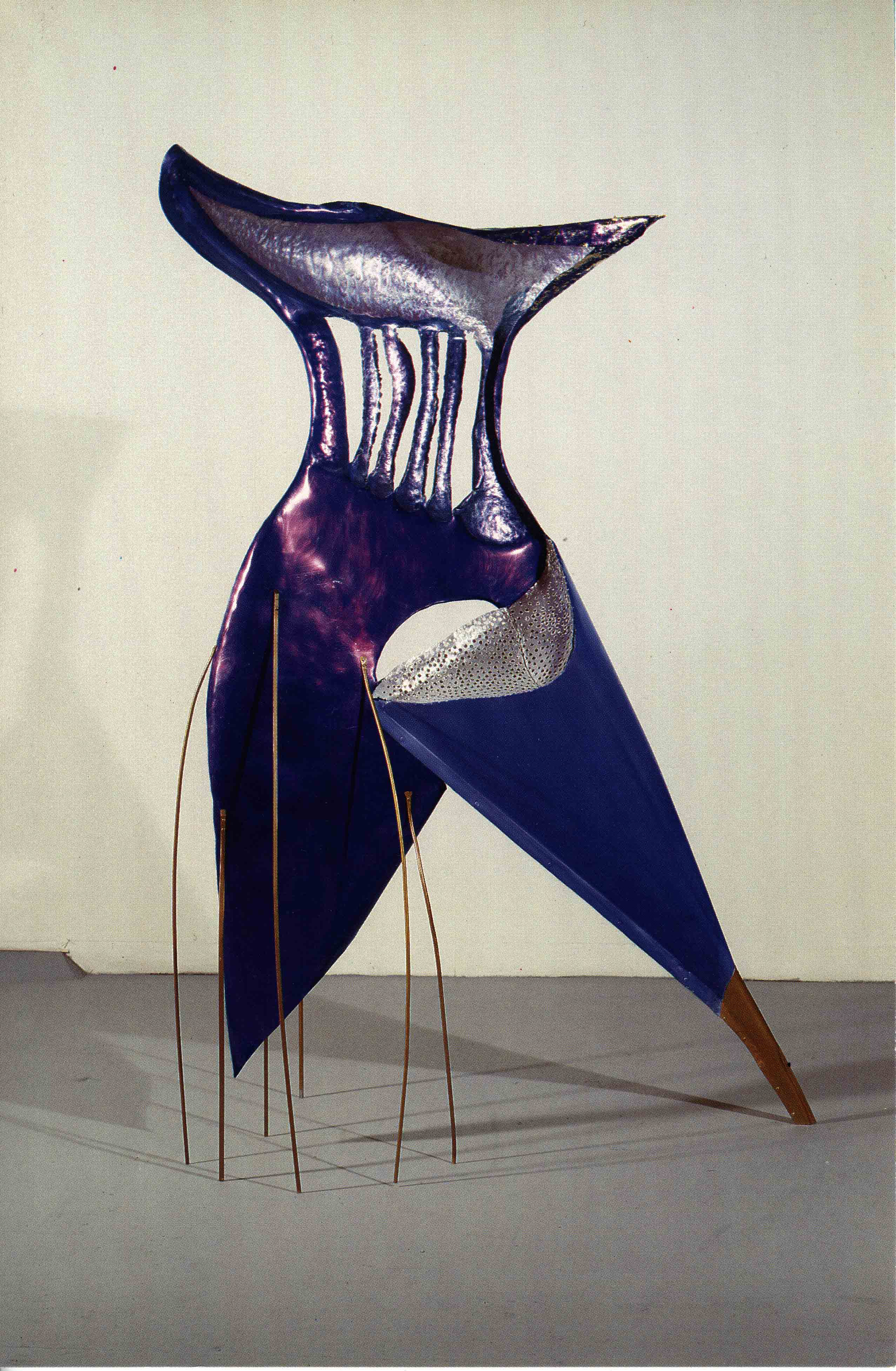
Burmese Nights, 1984. An example of Shelagh Cluett's 1980s work. Burmese Nights appeared in Vogue.

In the mid 1980s Cluett's work began to move away from linear forms to explore the influences of her travels in the Far East; they provided her with a new wealth of imagery and an intensified palette, lending greater freedom to her sculpture. Colours gathered greater importance; applied to more expansive hammered metal surfaces, they cause the work to shine and glisten. Though travel research was an integral part of Cluett's working process, it had to be fitted around her commitments at Chelsea College of Art and Design, where she had become a Principal Lecturer and head of the MA Sculpture course.

She exhibited her works in Briain and internationally, in France, South Korea, India and the United States.

Cluett became increasingly fascinated by the charged relationships between the spiritual and the physical in the buildings she saw – the sacred landscape of the architecture. She began to use the computer to manipulate temple plans, shaping them to position the viewer in relation to the structure. The plan was then sandblasted on to a stone slab, which left it in polished relief against the vulnerable surface of the exposed stone. Cluett believed this practice created tensions in her work; the juxtaposed surfaces at once drawing the viewer in with tactility of the stone, and pushing them away with the manipulation of the plan, eventually leaving them to float somewhere in between.

== Exploring the digital medium - later work ==
In the later works such as the Maps Without Territories Series (images/sculptures made in the 1990s and early 2000s) stone slabs were shown with images taken from deep within the temples. The photographs taken by Cluett at the end of her own journey into the building, served as a means of appropriation, and also to pinpoint a specific moment in the life of the building.

Cluett's strong belief in the importance of computers as an artist's medium, was reflected both in her work as a sculptor and as a lecturer. She was a founding member of FADE (Fine Art Digital Environment), which operated between Camberwell College of Arts and Chelsea providing facilities and advice to students, and presented work at a number of 'digital art' conferences across the globe. The Khajuraho Series (2002–03) based on the Khajuraho temple complex, exhibited at the V&A (2003) in an exhibit called Digital Responses, showcases the combination of digital imagery, video, and sculpture, which became increasingly typical in Cluett's work.

Plans of the buildings were superimposed across photographs of sculpted figures, resembling tattoos, in an attempt to unite the bodies with the architecture and each other. Cluett then employed the tattooed figures as tools in her subsequent project, which sought to uncover a latent sensuality in the digital surface. The resultant work was Under the Skin (2003), a film made using LCD screens and video equipment. Using glitches which occurred in the different digital apparatus when zooming in and out of images on the screen, and layering them with other imagery, Cluett made a film with the depth and richness she desired.

Dead Ahead (2004) and Sea Fever (2005) are two digital projects that reflect and develop the discoveries made by Cluett in Under the Skin. Cluett's thoughts and ideas surrounding the sea and coastline – omnipresent elements in her life – are played out in imagery which presents the constant flux of the strand. By using the same image in several different programmes Cluett discovered that information often got scrambled, creating 'incidents' on the surface, and leaving behind a visual history of the image. She also realised that in slowing down or speeding up a recorded image, the corresponding sound accompaniment was effected in the same way, inadvertently providing a soundtrack to her work.

Pursuing her interest in pixellation, and the breakdown of an image, Cluett's attentions turned to early mosaics – a type of primitive pixellation. On various trips to ancient sites of Roman inhabitation (such as Pompeii and Ostia Antica), Cluett documented a great number of mosaics and their surrounding context. This material was used to make two new films Ostia I and II (2006–07) as well as twisted and extruded digital images of mosaics, intended for projection on to unusual surfaces in an attempt at "cross fertilisation" of media. A project unfortunately left unfinished upon her death.

Cluett died in London on 25 July 2007 after suffering an aggressive cancer.

== The Shelagh Cluett Trust ==
The Shelagh Cluett Trust has been set up in her name, and there is an extensive archive of her work which documents her career as a sculptor from the late 1960s until 2007.
