= David Cluett =

Maltese footballer (1965–2005)

Personal information
- Date of birth: 2 August 1965
- Place of birth: Sliema, Malta
- Date of death: 17 July 2005 (aged 39)
- Place of death: England
- Position: Goalkeeper

Senior career*
Years	Team	Apps	(Gls)
1983–1986	Melita	33	(0)
1986–1999	Floriana	160	(0)
1999–2000	Gozo	17	(0)
2000–2001	Birkirkara	6	(0)
2001–2002	Floriana	8	(0)
Total		224	(0)

International career
1987–1996	Malta	69	(0)
- * Club domestic league appearances and goals

David Cluett (2 August 1965 – 17 July 2005) was a Maltese professional footballer who played as a goalkeeper.

Cluett is regarded as one of the best goalkeepers in Maltese football. His best years were those at Floriana F.C. with whom he won a number of honours.

== Club career ==
=== Melita ===
Cluett started his career with St Julians side Melita F.C., in 1979. Cluett spent one season there.

=== Floriana ===
In 1986, Cluett moved to Floriana F.C. During his time with the Greens Cluett fast became a fan favorite, with his dominating figure between the posts helped lead the club to a new era of honours. During his 13-year spell with Floriana he went on to win all domestic honours. His best phase with the club was most definitely between 1992 and 1994 winning the triple crown in the first season. The following season Cluett went on to set a national record, 736 minutes without conceding a goal, Floriana went on to win three domestic honours that season.

=== Last footballing years ===
After Floriana, Cluett had two short spells with Birkirkara F.C. and Gozo F.C. before returning to play for Floriana. Following his retirement from football Cluett worked with Msida Saint-Joseph F.C. as a goalkeeping coach.

== International career ==
On 29 March 1987, Cluett made his international debut in a 2–2 draw against Portugal. In total he won 69 caps for Malta, the last on being on 27 March 1996 in 1–0 away defeat to Macedonia.

== Death ==
On 17 July 2005, Cluett died after a long battle against a serious illness.

== Honours ==
Floriana

- Premier League: 1992–93
- F.A. Trophy: 1992–93, 1993–94
- Super Cup: 1992–93
- Super 5 Cup: 1993–94, 1994–95, 1995–96, 1997–98
- Lowenbrau Cup: 1993–94

Individual

- National Record: 736 Minutes without conceding a goal.
