= Ivan Komarov (fencer) =

Soviet fencer

Personal information
- Born: 19 June 1921
- Died: 11 April 2005 (aged 83)

Sport
- Sport: Fencing

Ivan Komarov (Russian: Иван Комаров; 19 June 1921 – 11 April 2005) was a Soviet fencer. He competed in the team foil event at the 1952 Summer Olympics.
