= 2018 Men's European Water Polo Championship squads =

This article shows all participating team squads at the 2018 Men's European Water Polo Championship, held in Spain from 16 to 28 July 2018.

Ages as of 16 July 2018.

== Group A ==
=== Georgia ===
Head coach: Revaz Chomakhidze

No	Name	Date of birth	Position	L/R	Height	Weight	Club
1	Nikoloz Shubladze	27 December 1993 (aged 24)	Goalkeeper	R	1.90 m (6 ft 3 in)	95 kg (209 lb)	(Montenegro) VK Primorac Kotor
2	Beka Kavtaradze	9 July 1990 (aged 28)	Defender	R	1.91 m (6 ft 3 in)	102 kg (225 lb)	(Georgia (country)) VK Locomotive Tbilisi
3	Damir Tsrepulia	16 January 1984 (aged 34)	All-round	L	1.90 m (6 ft 3 in)	93 kg (205 lb)	(Montenegro) VK Primorac Kotor
4	Revaz Imnaishvili	9 August 1997 (aged 20)	Field player	R	1.86 m (6 ft 1 in)	96 kg (212 lb)	(Italy) Rari Nantes Sori
5	Andria Bitadze	17 May 1997 (aged 21)	Centre forward	L	2.03 m (6 ft 8 in)	115 kg (254 lb)	(Italy) Roma Vis Nova
6	Marko Jelaca	15 December 1982 (aged 35)	Defender	R	2.05 m (6 ft 9 in)	105 kg (231 lb)	(Italy) CC Ortigia
7	Khvicha Jakhaia	16 September 1996 (aged 21)	Defender	L	1.95 m (6 ft 5 in)	103 kg (227 lb)	(Georgia (country)) Dinamo Tbilisi
8	Mikheil Baghaturia	9 May 1987 (aged 31)	Wing	L	1.83 m (6 ft 0 in)	85 kg (187 lb)	(Georgia (country)) Dinamo Tbilisi
9	Zurab Rurua (C)	8 June 1987 (aged 31)	Wing	R	1.86 m (6 ft 1 in)	87 kg (192 lb)	(Georgia (country)) Dinamo Tbilisi
10	Konstantine Gegelashvili	7 May 1983 (aged 35)	Centre forward	R	1.85 m (6 ft 1 in)	94 kg (207 lb)	(Georgia (country)) VK Locomotive Tbilisi
11	Giorgi Magrakvelidze	21 January 1998 (aged 20)	Field player	R	1.83 m (6 ft 0 in)	90 kg (200 lb)	(Slovakia) KVP Nováky
12	Giorgi Meskhi	25 April 1998 (aged 20)	Field player	R	1.88 m (6 ft 2 in)	84 kg (185 lb)	(Serbia) VK Šabac
13	Irakli Razmadze	4 April 1997 (aged 21)	Goalkeeper	L	1.95 m (6 ft 5 in)	92 kg (203 lb)	(Georgia (country)) Dinamo Tbilisi

=== Germany ===
Head coach: Hagen Stamm

No	Name	Date of birth	Position	L/R	Height	Weight	Club
1	Moritz Schenkel	4 September 1990 (aged 27)	Goalkeeper	R	2.03 m (6 ft 8 in)	103 kg (227 lb)	(Germany) Waspo Hannover
2	Ben Reibel	27 August 1997 (aged 20)	All-round	R	2.07 m (6 ft 9 in)	97 kg (214 lb)	(Germany) Spandau 04
3	Timo van der Bosch	13 November 1993 (aged 24)	Centre forward	R	1.94 m (6 ft 4 in)	103 kg (227 lb)	(Germany) SV Ludwigsburg
4	Julian Real	22 December 1989 (aged 28)	Defender	R	2.00 m (6 ft 7 in)	110 kg (240 lb)	(Germany) Waspo Hannover
5	Tobias Preuss	3 August 1988 (aged 29)	Field player	R	1.83 m (6 ft 0 in)	85 kg (187 lb)	(Germany) Waspo Hannover
6	Maurice Jüngling	6 October 1991 (aged 26)	All-round	R	1.84 m (6 ft 0 in)	88 kg (194 lb)	(Germany) Spandau 04
7	Reiko Zech	22 May 1995 (aged 23)	Defender	R	2.00 m (6 ft 7 in)	108 kg (238 lb)	(Germany) Waspo Hannover
8	Hannes Schulz	25 May 1990 (aged 28)	Field player	R	1.88 m (6 ft 2 in)	93 kg (205 lb)	(Germany) OSC Potsdam
9	Marko Stamm (C)	30 August 1988 (aged 29)	Wing	R	1.88 m (6 ft 2 in)	97 kg (214 lb)	(Germany) Spandau 04
10	Dennis Strelezkij	22 April 1998 (aged 20)	Field player	R	1.85 m (6 ft 1 in)	99 kg (218 lb)	(Germany) Spandau 04
11	Marin Restović	22 July 1990 (aged 27)	Field player	L	1.92 m (6 ft 4 in)	94 kg (207 lb)	(Germany) Spandau 04
12	Dennis Eidner	4 August 1989 (aged 28)	Centre forward	R	1.80 m (5 ft 11 in)	112 kg (247 lb)	(Germany) ASC Duisburg
13	Kevin Götz	3 February 1993 (aged 25)	Goalkeeper	R	1.90 m (6 ft 3 in)	87 kg (192 lb)	(Germany) White Sharks Hannover

=== Hungary ===
Head coach: Tamás Märcz

No	Name	Date of birth	Position	L/R	Height	Weight	Club
1	Viktor Nagy (C)	July 24, 1984 (aged 33)	Goalkeeper	R	1.98 m (6 ft 6 in)	100 kg (220 lb)	(Hungary) Szolnok
2	Dániel Angyal	29 March 1992 (aged 26)	Defender	R	2.03 m (6 ft 8 in)	108 kg (238 lb)	(Hungary) Eger
3	Krisztián Manhercz	6 February 1997 (aged 21)	Wing	R	1.92 m (6 ft 4 in)	91 kg (201 lb)	(Hungary) Ferencváros
4	Gergő Zalánki	26 February 1995 (aged 23)	Field player	L	1.93 m (6 ft 4 in)	88 kg (194 lb)	(Hungary) Szolnok
5	Márton Vámos	24 June 1992 (aged 26)	Centre back	L	2.03 m (6 ft 8 in)	106 kg (234 lb)	(Hungary) Ferencváros
6	Tamás Mezei	14 September 1990 (aged 27)	Centre forward	L	1.97 m (6 ft 6 in)	108 kg (238 lb)	(Hungary) Szolnok
7	Dávid Jansik	28 February 1991 (aged 27)	Defender	R	2.03 m (6 ft 8 in)	108 kg (238 lb)	(Hungary) Szolnok
8	Gergő Kovács	2 September 1995 (aged 22)	Field player	R	2.03 m (6 ft 8 in)	108 kg (238 lb)	(Hungary) Eger
9	Balázs Erdélyi	16 February 1990 (aged 28)	Field player	R	1.96 m (6 ft 5 in)	94 kg (207 lb)	(Hungary) OSC
10	Bence Bátori	28 December 1991 (aged 26)	Wing	R	1.93 m (6 ft 4 in)	100 kg (220 lb)	(Hungary) Szolnok
11	Krisztián Bedő	4 May 1993 (aged 25)	Centre forward	R	1.93 m (6 ft 4 in)	107 kg (236 lb)	(Hungary) Eger
12	Zoltán Pohl	27 March 1995 (aged 23)	Defender	R	1.94 m (6 ft 4 in)	98 kg (216 lb)	(Hungary) Ferencváros
13	Soma Vogel	7 July 1997 (aged 21)	Goalkeeper	R	1.98 m (6 ft 6 in)	84 kg (185 lb)	(Hungary) Ferencváros

=== Italy ===
Head coach: Alessandro Campagna

No	Name	Date of birth	Position	L/R	Height	Weight	Club
1	Marco Del Lungo	3 January 1990 (aged 28)	Goalkeeper	R	1.90 m (6 ft 3 in)	100 kg (220 lb)	(Italy) AN Brescia
2	Francesco Di Fulvio	15 August 1993 (aged 24)	Field player	R	1.88 m (6 ft 2 in)	82 kg (181 lb)	(Italy) Pro Recco
3	Guillermo Molina	16 March 1984 (aged 34)	Centre back	R	1.94 m (6 ft 4 in)	108 kg (238 lb)	(Italy) Pro Recco
4	Pietro Figlioli (C)	29 May 1984 (aged 34)	Field player	R	1.92 m (6 ft 4 in)	97 kg (214 lb)	(Italy) Pallanuoto Sport Management
5	Andrea Fondelli	27 February 1994 (aged 24)	Field player	L	1.87 m (6 ft 2 in)	90 kg (200 lb)	(Italy) Pallanuoto Sport Management
6	Alessandro Velotto	12 February 1995 (aged 23)	Defender	R	1.85 m (6 ft 1 in)	79 kg (174 lb)	(Italy) CC Napoli
7	Vincenzo Renzuto	8 April 1993 (aged 25)	Defender	R	1.82 m (6 ft 0 in)	76 kg (168 lb)	(Croatia) VK Jug
8	Valentino Gallo	17 July 1985 (aged 32)	Field player	L	1.93 m (6 ft 4 in)	92 kg (203 lb)	(Italy) Pallanuoto Sport Management
9	Nicholas Presciutti	14 December 1993 (aged 24)	Centre forward	R	1.90 m (6 ft 3 in)	90 kg (200 lb)	(Italy) AN Brescia
10	Michaël Bodegas	3 May 1987 (aged 31)	Centre back	R	1.92 m (6 ft 4 in)	102 kg (225 lb)	(Italy) Pro Recco
11	Gonzalo Echenique	27 April 1990 (aged 28)	Wing	L	1.94 m (6 ft 4 in)	94 kg (207 lb)	(Italy) Pro Recco
12	Zeno Bertoli	22 December 1988 (aged 29)	Defender	R	1.90 m (6 ft 3 in)	90 kg (200 lb)	(Italy) AN Brescia
13	Gianmarco Nicosia	12 February 1998 (aged 20)	Goalkeeper	R	1.87 m (6 ft 2 in)	87 kg (192 lb)	(Italy) Pallanuoto Sport Management

== Group B ==
=== France ===
Head coach: Nenad Vukanić

No	Name	Date of birth	Position	L/R	Height	Weight	Club
1	Rémi Garsau	19 July 1984 (aged 33)	Goalkeeper	R	1.91 m (6 ft 3 in)	92 kg (203 lb)	(France) ON Nice
2	Rémi Saudadier	20 March 1986 (aged 32)	All-round	R	1.98 m (6 ft 6 in)	100 kg (220 lb)	(Germany) Spandau 04
3	Mathias Olivon	29 June 1995 (aged 23)	All-round	R	1.85 m (6 ft 1 in)	93 kg (205 lb)	(France) CN Marseille
4	Nenad Vukanić	21 December 1995 (aged 22)	All-round	R	1.91 m (6 ft 3 in)	87 kg (192 lb)	(France) ON Nice
5	Enzo Khasz	13 August 1993 (aged 24)	Centre forward	R	2.02 m (6 ft 8 in)	105 kg (231 lb)	(France) USB Bordeaux
6	Thomas Vernoux	21 March 2002 (aged 16)	Field player	R	1.90 m (6 ft 3 in)	87 kg (192 lb)	(France) CN Marseille
7	Ugo Crousillat (C)	27 October 1990 (aged 27)	All-round	L	1.92 m (6 ft 4 in)	85 kg (187 lb)	(France) Pays d'Aix Natation
8	Dino Guillaume	24 March 1995 (aged 23)	All-round	R	1.90 m (6 ft 3 in)	85 kg (187 lb)	(Serbia) VK Radnički Kragujevac
9	Romain Marion-Vernoux	2 January 2000 (aged 18)	Defender	R	1.89 m (6 ft 2 in)	85 kg (187 lb)	(France) CN Marseille
10	Charles Canonne	9 February 1996 (aged 22)	Field player	R	1.87 m (6 ft 2 in)	87 kg (192 lb)	(France) FNC Douai
11	Pierre Vanpeperstraete	15 April 1992 (aged 26)	Wing	R	1.90 m (6 ft 3 in)	104 kg (229 lb)	(France) Team Strasbourg
12	Hugo Lepoint	29 April 1999 (aged 19)	All-round	R	1.87 m (6 ft 2 in)	82 kg (181 lb)	(France) FNC Douai
13	Hugo Fontani	22 December 1994 (aged 23)	Goalkeeper	R	1.90 m (6 ft 3 in)	85 kg (187 lb)	(France) Team Strasbourg

=== Malta ===
Head coach: Karl Izzo

No	Name	Date of birth	Position	L/R	Height	Weight	Club
1	Nicholas-Kane Grixti	13 October 1995 (aged 22)	Goalkeeper	R	1.86 m (6 ft 1 in)	92 kg (203 lb)	(Malta) Sirens
2	Jerome Gabarretta	3 June 1990 (aged 28)	Centre forward	R	1.96 m (6 ft 5 in)	95 kg (209 lb)	(Malta) Sliema
3	Andreas Galea	17 September 1996 (aged 21)	Wing	R	1.77 m (5 ft 10 in)	74 kg (163 lb)	(Malta) San Giljan
4	Jeremy Abela	10 June 1998 (aged 20)	Centre forward	R	1.86 m (6 ft 1 in)	99 kg (218 lb)	(Malta) Neptunes
5	Michael Spiteri	4 August 1992 (aged 25)	Wing	L	1.83 m (6 ft 0 in)	90 kg (200 lb)	(Malta) Sliema
6	Matthew Zammit	1 October 1987 (aged 30)	Centre forward	L	1.96 m (6 ft 5 in)	118 kg (260 lb)	(Malta) San Giljan
7	Stevie Camilleri (C)	4 July 1987 (aged 31)	Field player	R	1.90 m (6 ft 3 in)	93 kg (205 lb)	(Malta) Neptunes
8	Jordan Camilleri	14 September 1992 (aged 25)	Defender	R	1.86 m (6 ft 1 in)	88 kg (194 lb)	(Malta) Neptunes
9	Ben Plumpton	16 February 1998 (aged 20)	All-round	R	1.86 m (6 ft 1 in)	76 kg (168 lb)	(Malta) San Giljan
10	Aurelien Cousin	1 February 1980 (aged 38)	Defender	R	1.98 m (6 ft 6 in)	110 kg (240 lb)	(Malta) Exiles
11	Nicholas Bugelli	11 February 1997 (aged 21)	Wing	R	1.80 m (5 ft 11 in)	80 kg (180 lb)	(Malta) Sliema
12	Dino Zammit	14 December 1994 (aged 23)	Field player	R	1.77 m (5 ft 10 in)	95 kg (209 lb)	(Malta) San Giljan
13	Jake Tanti	12 June 1998 (aged 20)	Goalkeeper	R	1.89 m (6 ft 2 in)	87 kg (192 lb)	(Malta) San Giljan

=== Montenegro ===
Head coach: Vladimir Gojković

No	Name	Date of birth	Position	L/R	Height	Weight	Club
1	Dejan Lazović	8 February 1990 (aged 28)	Goalkeeper	R	1.93 m (6 ft 4 in)	97 kg (214 lb)	(Italy) Pallanuoto Sport Management
2	Draško Brguljan	27 December 1984 (aged 33)	Defender	R	1.94 m (6 ft 4 in)	91 kg (201 lb)	(Hungary) Orvosegyetem SC
3	Dragan Drašković	9 January 1988 (aged 30)	Wing	R	1.94 m (6 ft 4 in)	95 kg (209 lb)	(Montenegro) PVK Jadran
4	Marko Petković	3 March 1989 (aged 29)	All-round	R	1.89 m (6 ft 2 in)	85 kg (187 lb)	(Montenegro) PVK Jadran
5	Đuro Radović	20 February 1999 (aged 19)	Wing	R	1.93 m (6 ft 4 in)	92 kg (203 lb)	(Montenegro) PVK Jadran
6	Aleksandar Radović	24 February 1987 (aged 31)	Wing	R	1.88 m (6 ft 2 in)	91 kg (201 lb)	(Germany) Waspo Hannover
7	Mlađan Janović	11 June 1984 (aged 34)	Wing	R	1.93 m (6 ft 4 in)	92 kg (203 lb)	(Italy) AN Brescia
8	Bogdan Đurđić	8 August 1996 (aged 21)	Wing	R	1.84 m (6 ft 0 in)	82 kg (181 lb)	(France) CN Marseille
9	Aleksandar Ivović	24 February 1986 (aged 32)	Wing	R	1.98 m (6 ft 6 in)	108 kg (238 lb)	(Italy) Pro Recco
10	Saša Mišić	27 March 1987 (aged 31)	Centre forward	R	1.98 m (6 ft 6 in)	100 kg (220 lb)	(Hungary) Miskolci VLC
11	Uroš Čučković	25 April 1990 (aged 28)	Defender	R	1.99 m (6 ft 6 in)	103 kg (227 lb)	(Hungary) Egri VK
12	Vladan Spaić	18 June 1997 (aged 21)	Centre forward	R	1.89 m (6 ft 2 in)	100 kg (220 lb)	(Montenegro) PVK Jadran
13	Miloš Šćepanović	10 September 1982 (aged 35)	Goalkeeper	R	1.85 m (6 ft 1 in)	90 kg (200 lb)	(France) CN Marseille

=== Spain ===
Head coach: David Martín

No	Name	Date of birth	Position	L/R	Height	Weight	Club
1	Daniel López	16 July 1980 (aged 38)	Goalkeeper	R	1.91 m (6 ft 3 in)	90 kg (200 lb)	(Spain) CN Atlètic-Barceloneta
2	Alberto Munarriz	19 May 1994 (aged 24)	Defender	R	1.97 m (6 ft 6 in)	105 kg (231 lb)	(Spain) CN Atlètic-Barceloneta
3	Álvaro Granados	8 October 1998 (aged 19)	Field player	R	1.90 m (6 ft 3 in)	86 kg (190 lb)	(Spain) CN Atlètic-Barceloneta
4	Miguel de Toro Domínguez	16 August 1993 (aged 24)	Centre forward	R	2.03 m (6 ft 8 in)	110 kg (240 lb)	(Spain) CE Mediterrani
5	Marc Minguell (C)	14 January 1985 (aged 33)	Field player	R	1.88 m (6 ft 2 in)	94 kg (207 lb)	(Spain) CE Mediterrani
6	Marc Larumbe	30 April 1994 (aged 24)	Field player	R	1.98 m (6 ft 6 in)	92 kg (203 lb)	(Spain) CN Atlètic-Barceloneta
7	Sergi Cabanas	10 February 1996 (aged 22)	Defender	R	1.90 m (6 ft 3 in)	88 kg (194 lb)	(Spain) CN Sabadell
8	Francisco Fernández	21 June 1986 (aged 32)	Wing	R	1.85 m (6 ft 1 in)	83 kg (183 lb)	(Spain) CN Atlètic-Barceloneta
9	Roger Tahull	11 May 1997 (aged 21)	Centre forward	R	1.95 m (6 ft 5 in)	104 kg (229 lb)	(Spain) CN Atlètic-Barceloneta
10	Felipe Perrone	27 February 1986 (aged 32)	Field player	R	1.82 m (6 ft 0 in)	87 kg (192 lb)	(Spain) CN Atlètic-Barceloneta
11	Blai Mallarach	21 August 1987 (aged 30)	Field player	R	1.87 m (6 ft 2 in)	87 kg (192 lb)	(Spain) CN Atlètic-Barceloneta
12	Alejandro Bustos	17 March 1997 (aged 21)	Defender	R	1.92 m (6 ft 4 in)	105 kg (231 lb)	(Spain) CN Atlètic-Barceloneta
13	Eduardo Lorrio	25 September 1993 (aged 24)	Goalkeeper	R	1.93 m (6 ft 4 in)	85 kg (187 lb)	(Spain) CN Barcelona

== Group C ==
=== Croatia ===
Head coach: Ivica Tucak

No	Name	Date of birth	Position	L/R	Height	Weight	Club
1	Marko Bijač	12 January 1991 (aged 27)	Goalkeeper	R	1.99 m (6 ft 6 in)	88 kg (194 lb)	(Croatia) VK Jug
2	Marko Macan	26 April 1993 (aged 25)	Defender	R	1.95 m (6 ft 5 in)	112 kg (247 lb)	(Croatia) VK Jug
3	Loren Fatović	16 November 1996 (aged 21)	Wing	R	1.85 m (6 ft 1 in)	84 kg (185 lb)	(Croatia) VK Jug
4	Luka Lončar	26 June 1987 (aged 31)	Centre back	R	1.95 m (6 ft 5 in)	106 kg (234 lb)	(Croatia) VK Jug
5	Maro Joković	10 January 1987 (aged 31)	Goalkeeper	R	2.04 m (6 ft 8 in)	97 kg (214 lb)	(Croatia) VK Jug
6	Ivan Buljubašić	31 January 1987 (aged 31)	Defender	R	1.98 m (6 ft 6 in)	107 kg (236 lb)	(Romania) CSA Steaua București
7	Ante Vukičević	24 February 1993 (aged 25)	Wing	R	1.87 m (6 ft 2 in)	95 kg (209 lb)	(France) CN Marseille
8	Andro Bušlje (C)	4 January 1986 (aged 32)	Defender	R	1.99 m (6 ft 6 in)	115 kg (254 lb)	(Greece) Olympiacos
9	Lovre Miloš	5 April 1994 (aged 24)	Field player	R	1.96 m (6 ft 5 in)	94 kg (207 lb)	(Croatia) HAVK Mladost
10	Josip Vrlić	25 April 1986 (aged 32)	Centre forward	R	1.98 m (6 ft 6 in)	130 kg (290 lb)	(Spain) CN Atlètic-Barceloneta
11	Anđelo Šetka	14 September 1985 (aged 32)	Wing	R	1.77 m (5 ft 10 in)	86 kg (190 lb)	(Croatia) VK Jadran Split
12	Xavier García	5 January 1984 (aged 34)	Field player	R	1.98 m (6 ft 6 in)	92 kg (203 lb)	(Croatia) VK Jug
13	Ivan Marcelić	18 February 1994 (aged 24)	Goalkeeper	R	1.92 m (6 ft 4 in)	106 kg (234 lb)	(Croatia) HAVK Mladost

=== Greece ===
Head coach: Thodoris Vlachos

No	Name	Date of birth	Position	L/R	Height	Weight	Club
1	Konstantinos Flegkas	17 July 1988 (aged 29)	Goalkeeper	R	1.92 m (6 ft 4 in)	90 kg (200 lb)	(Greece) NC Ydraikos
2	Konstantinos Genidounias	3 May 1993 (aged 25)	Field player	R	1.83 m (6 ft 0 in)	90 kg (200 lb)	(Greece) Olympiacos
3	Dimitrios Skoumpakis	18 December 1998 (aged 19)	Defender	R	2.03 m (6 ft 8 in)	110 kg (240 lb)	(Greece) ANO Glyfada
4	Dimitrios Nikolaidis	10 June 1999 (aged 19)	Defender	R	1.94 m (6 ft 4 in)	100 kg (220 lb)	(Greece) Olympiacos
5	Ioannis Fountoulis (C)	25 May 1988 (aged 30)	Field player	R	1.86 m (6 ft 1 in)	90 kg (200 lb)	(Greece) Olympiacos
6	Marios Kapotsis	13 September 1991 (aged 26)	Wing	R	1.84 m (6 ft 0 in)	87 kg (192 lb)	(Greece) NC Vouliagmeni
7	Georgios Dervisis	30 October 1994 (aged 23)	Field player	R	1.95 m (6 ft 5 in)	95 kg (209 lb)	(Greece) Olympiacos
8	Stylianos Argyropoulos	2 August 1996 (aged 21)	Centre forward	R	1.90 m (6 ft 3 in)	96 kg (212 lb)	(Greece) Olympiacos
9	Konstantinos Mourikis	11 July 1988 (aged 30)	Centre forward	R	1.97 m (6 ft 6 in)	109 kg (240 lb)	(Greece) Olympiacos
10	Christodoulos Kolomvos	26 October 1988 (aged 29)	Centre forward	R	1.86 m (6 ft 1 in)	105 kg (231 lb)	(Turkey) Enka SK
11	Alexandros Gounas	3 October 1989 (aged 28)	Field player	R	1.79 m (5 ft 10 in)	73 kg (161 lb)	(Greece) Olympiacos
12	Angelos Vlachopoulos	28 September 1991 (aged 26)	Field player	R	1.80 m (5 ft 11 in)	77 kg (170 lb)	(Hungary) Egri VK
13	Emmanouil Zerdevas	12 August 1997 (aged 20)	Goalkeeper	R	1.84 m (6 ft 0 in)	90 kg (200 lb)	(Greece) NC Vouliagmeni

=== Netherlands ===
Head coach: Robin van Galen

No	Name	Date of birth	Position	L/R	Height	Weight	Club
1	Eelco Wagenaar	22 November 1991 (aged 26)	Goalkeeper	R	1.96 m (6 ft 5 in)	87 kg (192 lb)	(Netherlands) Edese Zwem- & Poloclub Polar Bears
2	Sam van den Burg	25 October 1997 (aged 20)	Centre back	R	1.98 m (6 ft 6 in)	96 kg (212 lb)	(Spain) CN Barcelona
3	Jorn Winkelhorst	26 December 1991 (aged 26)	Centre forward	R	2.00 m (6 ft 7 in)	116 kg (256 lb)	(Germany) Waspo Hannover
4	Ruud van der Horst (C)	3 June 1991 (aged 27)	Centre back	R	1.89 m (6 ft 2 in)	100 kg (220 lb)	(Netherlands) Edese Zwem- & Poloclub Polar Bears
5	Guus van Ijperen	28 February 1995 (aged 23)	Centre forward	R	1.98 m (6 ft 6 in)	97 kg (214 lb)	(Spain) CN Barcelona
6	Robin Lindhout	25 October 1990 (aged 27)	Field player	R	1.94 m (6 ft 4 in)	107 kg (236 lb)	(Italy) CC Ortigia
7	Lars Gottemaker	29 July 1998 (aged 19)	Wing	L	1.86 m (6 ft 1 in)	94 kg (207 lb)	(Netherlands) ZPC Het Ravijn
8	Miloš Filipović	13 March 1992 (aged 26)	Wing	L	1.90 m (6 ft 3 in)	89 kg (196 lb)	(Netherlands) Schuurman BZC
9	Harmen Muller	13 April 1995 (aged 23)	All-round	R	1.91 m (6 ft 3 in)	88 kg (194 lb)	(Spain) CN Sabadell
10	Pascal Janssen	24 March 1996 (aged 22)	All-round	R	1.85 m (6 ft 1 in)	87 kg (192 lb)	(France) Team Strasbourg
11	Jesse Koopman	4 April 1993 (aged 25)	All-round	R	1.95 m (6 ft 5 in)	95 kg (209 lb)	(Romania) CSM Digi Oradea
12	Thomas Lucas	25 April 1989 (aged 29)	Centre forward	R	2.00 m (6 ft 7 in)	105 kg (231 lb)	(Italy) Nuoto Catania
13	Milan de Koff	7 June 1995 (aged 23)	Goalkeeper	R	1.96 m (6 ft 5 in)	85 kg (187 lb)	(Netherlands) SVH Waterpolo

=== Turkey ===
Head coach: Sinan Turunç

No	Name	Date of birth	Position	L/R	Height	Weight	Club
1	Hüseyin Kağan Kil	23 July 1999 (aged 18)	Goalkeeper	R	1.91 m (6 ft 3 in)	83 kg (183 lb)	(Turkey) Galatasaray
2	Fatih Acar	22 November 1998 (aged 19)	Wing	R	1.88 m (6 ft 2 in)	80 kg (180 lb)	(Turkey) Enka SK
3	Oğuz Berke Senemoğlu	7 March 1995 (aged 23)	Driver	R	1.85 m (6 ft 1 in)	76 kg (168 lb)	(Turkey) Galatasaray
4	Ege Kahraman	8 March 1999 (aged 19)	Wing	R	1.86 m (6 ft 1 in)	78 kg (172 lb)	(Turkey) Enka SK
5	Berk Bıyık	1 January 1993 (aged 25)	Centre forward	R	1.94 m (6 ft 4 in)	110 kg (240 lb)	(Turkey) Galatasaray
6	Yuşa Hân Düzenli	15 September 2001 (aged 16)	Driver	R	1.88 m (6 ft 2 in)	86 kg (190 lb)	(Turkey) Enka SK
7	Tugay Ergin	3 January 1993 (aged 25)	Centre forward	R	1.88 m (6 ft 2 in)	98 kg (216 lb)	(Turkey) Enka SK
8	Eray Turan	23 February 1998 (aged 20)	Wing	R	1.80 m (5 ft 11 in)	97 kg (214 lb)	(Turkey) Galatasaray
9	Nadir Sönmez	29 October 1992 (aged 25)	Field player	R	1.86 m (6 ft 1 in)	97 kg (214 lb)	(Turkey) Heybeliada SC
10	Neşfet Toğkan Özbek	2 September 1994 (aged 23)	Wing	R	1.82 m (6 ft 0 in)	74 kg (163 lb)	(Turkey) Heybeliada SC
11	Ali Can Yılmaz (C)	10 June 1989 (aged 29)	Centre back	R	1.88 m (6 ft 2 in)	92 kg (203 lb)	(Turkey) Heybeliada SC
12	Emre Gürdenli	17 May 2000 (aged 18)	Centre back	R	1.90 m (6 ft 3 in)	90 kg (200 lb)	(Turkey) Enka SK
13	Emirhan Özdemir	26 September 1996 (aged 21)	Goalkeeper	R	2.01 m (6 ft 7 in)	94 kg (207 lb)	(Canada) Toronto Golden Jets

== Group D ==
=== Romania ===
Head coach: Dejan Stanojević

No	Name	Date of birth	Position	L/R	Height	Weight	Club
1	Marius Tic	9 September 1996 (aged 21)	Goalkeeper	R	1.92 m (6 ft 4 in)	100 kg (220 lb)	(Romania) Dinamo București
2	Cosmin Radu (C)	9 November 1981 (aged 36)	Centre forward	L	1.94 m (6 ft 4 in)	100 kg (220 lb)	(Croatia) HAVK Mladost
3	Tiberiu Negrean	1 September 1988 (aged 29)	Field player	R	1.87 m (6 ft 2 in)	90 kg (200 lb)	(Germany) Spandau 04
4	Mihnea Gheorghe	15 January 1994 (aged 24)	Driver	R	1.90 m (6 ft 3 in)	94 kg (207 lb)	(Romania) Steaua București
5	Tudor Fulea	13 March 1997 (aged 21)	Driver	R	1.97 m (6 ft 6 in)	84 kg (185 lb)	(Romania) Dinamo București
6	Vlad Georgescu	31 March 1999 (aged 19)	Wing	R	1.86 m (6 ft 1 in)	87 kg (192 lb)	(Romania) Corona Sportul Studentesc
7	Andrei Prioteasa	3 April 1996 (aged 22)	Driver	R	1.85 m (6 ft 1 in)	72 kg (159 lb)	(Romania) Dinamo București
8	Mihnea Chioveanu	21 August 1987 (aged 30)	Centre forward	R	1.98 m (6 ft 6 in)	113 kg (249 lb)	(Romania) Steaua București
9	Róbert Gergelyfi	8 May 1995 (aged 23)	Driver	R	1.87 m (6 ft 2 in)	86 kg (190 lb)	(Romania) CSM Digi Oradea
10	Nicolae Oanta	14 August 1990 (aged 27)	Centre back	R	1.94 m (6 ft 4 in)	100 kg (220 lb)	(Romania) Corona Sportul Studentesc
11	Alexandru Ghiban	12 October 1986 (aged 31)	Defender	R	1.96 m (6 ft 5 in)	99 kg (218 lb)	(Romania) Steaua București
12	Victor Antipa	9 June 1999 (aged 19)	Wing	L	1.84 m (6 ft 0 in)	93 kg (205 lb)	(Romania) Steaua București
13	Şerban Abrudan	28 November 2000 (aged 17)	Goalkeeper	R	1.94 m (6 ft 4 in)	89 kg (196 lb)	(Romania) Corona Sportul Studentesc

=== Russia ===
Head coach: Sergey Yevstigneyev

No	Name	Date of birth	Position	L/R	Height	Weight	Club
1	Petr Fedotov	2 July 1992 (aged 26)	Goalkeeper	R	1.90 m (6 ft 3 in)	82 kg (181 lb)	(Russia) Spartak Volgograd
2	Ivan Suchkov	15 June 1995 (aged 23)	Defender	R	1.96 m (6 ft 5 in)	95 kg (209 lb)	(Russia) Shturm Ruza
3	Stepan Andryukov	11 February 1991 (aged 27)	Field player	R	1.91 m (6 ft 3 in)	91 kg (201 lb)	(Russia) Spartak Volgograd
4	Nikita Dereviankin	21 June 1994 (aged 24)	Centre forward	R	1.97 m (6 ft 6 in)	107 kg (236 lb)	(Russia) Dynamo Moscow
5	Ivan Koptsev	28 July 1994 (aged 23)	Defender	R	1.97 m (6 ft 6 in)	97 kg (214 lb)	(Russia) Dynamo Moscow
6	Konstantin Kharkov	23 February 1997 (aged 21)	Wing	L	1.91 m (6 ft 3 in)	91 kg (201 lb)	(Russia) Shturm Ruza
7	Daniil Merkulov	3 March 1997 (aged 21)	Field player	R	1.94 m (6 ft 4 in)	105 kg (231 lb)	(Montenegro) PVK Jadran
8	Ivan Nagaev	30 November 1993 (aged 24)	Field player	L	1.94 m (6 ft 4 in)	92 kg (203 lb)	(Russia) Dynamo Moscow
9	Igor Bychkov	21 January 1994 (aged 24)	Field player	R	2.02 m (6 ft 8 in)	113 kg (249 lb)	(Russia) Dynamo Moscow
10	Dmitrii Kholod	16 January 1992 (aged 26)	Field player	R	1.96 m (6 ft 5 in)	104 kg (229 lb)	(Russia) Dynamo Moscow
11	Sergey Lisunov (C)	12 October 1986 (aged 31)	Centre forward	R	1.98 m (6 ft 6 in)	114 kg (251 lb)	(Russia) Dynamo Moscow
12	Roman Shepelev	3 August 1993 (aged 24)	Wing	R	1.96 m (6 ft 5 in)	87 kg (192 lb)	(Russia) Dynamo Moscow
13	Vitaly Statsenko	21 July 1997 (aged 20)	Goalkeeper	R	1.97 m (6 ft 6 in)	97 kg (214 lb)	(Russia) Spartak Volgograd

=== Serbia ===
Head coach: Dejan Savić

No	Name	Date of birth	Position	L/R	Height	Weight	Club
1	Gojko Pijetlović	7 August 1983 (aged 34)	Goalkeeper	R	1.97 m (6 ft 6 in)	97 kg (214 lb)	(Romania) CSM Digi Oradea
2	Dušan Mandić	16 June 1994 (aged 24)	Wing	L	2.02 m (6 ft 8 in)	100 kg (220 lb)	(Italy) Pro Recco
3	Viktor Rašović	13 August 1993 (aged 24)	Driver	R	1.90 m (6 ft 3 in)	90 kg (200 lb)	(Croatia) VK Jug
4	Sava Ranđelović	17 July 1993 (aged 24)	Centre back	R	1.93 m (6 ft 4 in)	80 kg (180 lb)	(Hungary) Orvosegyetem SC
5	Miloš Ćuk	21 December 1990 (aged 27)	Driver	R	1.91 m (6 ft 3 in)	91 kg (201 lb)	(Hungary) Szolnoki Vízilabda SC
6	Duško Pijetlović	25 April 1985 (aged 33)	Centre forward	R	1.97 m (6 ft 6 in)	97 kg (214 lb)	(Russia) Dynamo Moscow
7	Nemanja Vico	19 November 1994 (aged 23)	Centre forward	R			(Italy) Nuoto Catania
8	Milan Aleksić	13 May 1986 (aged 32)	Centre back	R	1.93 m (6 ft 4 in)	93 kg (205 lb)	(Hungary) Szolnoki Vízilabda SC
9	Nikola Jakšić	17 January 1997 (aged 21)	Centre back	R	1.97 m (6 ft 6 in)	89 kg (196 lb)	(Hungary) Ferencvárosi TC
10	Filip Filipović (C)	2 May 1987 (aged 31)	Wing	L	1.96 m (6 ft 5 in)	101 kg (223 lb)	(Italy) Pro Recco
11	Andrija Prlainović	28 April 1987 (aged 31)	Wing	R	1.87 m (6 ft 2 in)	93 kg (205 lb)	(Hungary) Szolnoki Vízilabda SC
12	Stefan Mitrović	29 March 1988 (aged 30)	Driver	R	1.95 m (6 ft 5 in)	91 kg (201 lb)	(Hungary) Ferencvárosi TC
13	Branislav Mitrović	30 January 1985 (aged 33)	Goalkeeper	R	2.01 m (6 ft 7 in)	100 kg (220 lb)	(Hungary) Egri VK

=== Slovakia ===
Head coach: Peter Nižný

No	Name	Date of birth	Position	L/R	Height	Weight	Club
1	Tomáš Hoferica	22 November 1993 (aged 24)	Goalkeeper	R	1.95 m (6 ft 5 in)	91 kg (201 lb)	(Slovakia) ŠK Hornets Košice
2	Ladislav Vidumanský	11 October 1984 (aged 33)	Wing	R	1.93 m (6 ft 4 in)	91 kg (201 lb)	(Slovakia) ŠK Hornets Košice
3	Juraj Zaťovič (C)	22 October 1982 (aged 35)	All-round	R	1.92 m (6 ft 4 in)	98 kg (216 lb)	(Greece) P.A.O.K.
4	Michal Úradník	7 January 2000 (aged 18)	Field player	L	1.93 m (6 ft 4 in)	101 kg (223 lb)	(Slovakia) KVP Nováky
5	Lukáš Ďurík	2 December 1992 (aged 25)	Centre forward	R	1.98 m (6 ft 6 in)	110 kg (240 lb)	(Hungary) Debreceni Cívis Póló Vízilabda SE
6	Patrik Tkáč	25 July 1996 (aged 21)	Wing	R	1.87 m (6 ft 2 in)	83 kg (183 lb)	(Slovakia) VK Slávia EU Bratislava
7	Maroš Tkáč	13 July 1996 (aged 22)	Wing	R	1.90 m (6 ft 3 in)	93 kg (205 lb)	(Croatia) VK Primorje
8	Marek Tkáč	9 March 1995 (aged 23)	All-round	R	1.89 m (6 ft 2 in)	97 kg (214 lb)	(Germany) Waspo Hannover
9	Tomáš Bielik	19 November 1993 (aged 24)	All-round	R	1.88 m (6 ft 2 in)	98 kg (216 lb)	(Slovakia) KVP Nováky
10	Matej Čaraj	20 September 2000 (aged 17)	Centre forward	L	1.87 m (6 ft 2 in)	101 kg (223 lb)	(Slovakia) KVP Nováky
11	Martin Kolárik	18 March 1986 (aged 32)	All-round	R	1.94 m (6 ft 4 in)	103 kg (227 lb)	(Hungary) TVSE Tatabánya
12	Samuel Baláž	5 January 1994 (aged 24)	All-round	R	1.85 m (6 ft 1 in)	95 kg (209 lb)	(Italy) CUS Messina
13	Martin Laciak	18 August 2000 (aged 17)	Goalkeeper	R	1.86 m (6 ft 1 in)	75 kg (165 lb)	(Slovakia) ŠK Hornets Košice
