= China at the 2023 World Aquatics Championships =

- Flag of China
- World Aquatics code: CHN
- National federation: Chinese Swimming Association
- Website: swimming.org.cn

in Fukuoka, Japan
- Competitors: 105 in 5 sports
- Medals Ranked 1st: Gold 20 Silver 8 Bronze 12 Total 40

World Aquatics Championships appearances
- 1973; 1975; 1978; 1982; 1986; 1991; 1994; 1998; 2001; 2003; 2005; 2007; 2009; 2011; 2013; 2015; 2017; 2019; 2022; 2023; 2024; 2025

China competed at the 2023 World Aquatics Championships in Fukuoka, Japan from 14 to 30 July.

== Medalists ==
Medal	Name	Sport	Event	Date
Gold	Wang Feilong; Zhang Jiaqi	Diving	Mixed synchronized 10 m platform	July 15
Gold	Lin Shan	Diving	Women's 1 m springboard	July 15
Gold	Long Daoyi; Wang Zongyuan	Diving	Men's synchronized 3 m springboard	July 15
Gold	Peng Jianfeng	Diving	Men's 1 m springboard	July 16
Gold	Chen Yuxi; Quan Hongchan	Diving	Women's synchronized 10 m platform	July 16
Gold	Chang Yani; Chen Yiwen	Diving	Women's synchronized 3 m springboard	July 17
Gold	Lian Junjie; Yang Hao	Diving	Men's synchronized 10 m platform	July 17
Gold	Chang Hao; Feng Yu; Zhang Yayi; Wang Ciyue; Xiao Yanning; Shi Haoyu; Cheng Wentao; Xiang Binxuan	Artistic swimming	Team acrobatic routine	July 17
Gold	Bai Yuming; Zheng Jiuyuan; Si Yajie; Zhang Minjie	Diving	Team event	July 18
Gold	Chen Yuxi	Diving	Women's 10 m platform	July 19
Gold	Wang Zongyuan	Diving	Men's 3 m springboard	July 20
Gold	Chen Yiwen	Diving	Women's 3 m springboard	July 21
Gold	Chang Hao; Feng Yu; Wang Ciyue; Wang Liuyi; Wang Qianyi; Xiang Binxuan; Xiao Yanning; Zhang Yayi	Artistic swimming	Team free routine	July 21
Gold	Cheng Wentao; Shi Haoyu	Artistic swimming	Mixed duet free routine	July 22
Gold	Zhu Zifeng; Lin Shan	Diving	Mixed synchronized 3 m springboard	July 22
Gold	Qin Haiyang	Swimming	Men's 100 m breaststroke	July 23
Gold	Zhang Yufei	Swimming	Women's 100 m butterfly	July 23
Gold	Qin Haiyang	Swimming	Men's 50 m breaststroke	July 26
Gold	Xu Jiayu; Qin Haiyang; Zhang Yufei; Cheng Yujie; Yan Zibei; Wang Yichun; Wu Qingfeng	Swimming	Mixed 4 × 100 m medley relay	July 26
Gold	Qin Haiyang	Swimming	Men's 200 m breaststroke	July 28
Silver	Li Yajie	Diving	Women's 1 m springboard	July 15
Silver	Quan Hongchan	Diving	Women's 10 m platform	July 19
Silver	Wang Liuyi; Wang Qianyi	Artistic swimming	Women's duet free routine	July 20
Silver	Chang Yani	Diving	Women's 3 m springboard	July 21
Silver	Lian Junjie	Diving	Men's 10 m platform	July 22
Silver	Zhang Yufei	Swimming	Women's 50 m butterfly	July 29
Silver	Li Bingjie	Swimming	Women's 800 m freestyle	July 29
Silver	Xu Jiayu; Qin Haiyang; Wang Changhao; Pan Zhanle; Yan Zibei; Sun Jiajun; Wang Haoyu	Swimming	Men's 4 × 100 m medley relay	July 30
Bronze	Zheng Jiuyuan	Diving	Men's 1 m springboard	July 16
Bronze	Cheng Wentao; Shi Haoyu	Artistic swimming	Mixed duet technical routine	July 16
Bronze	Long Daoyi	Diving	Men's 3 m springboard	July 20
Bronze	Yang Hao	Diving	Men's 10 m platform	July 22
Bronze	Cheng Yujie; Yang Junxuan; Wu Qingfeng; Zhang Yufei; Ai Yanhan; Zhu Menghui	Swimming	Women's 4 × 100 m freestyle relay	July 23
Bronze	Yu Yiting	Swimming	Women's 200 m individual medley	July 24
Bronze	Li Bingjie	Swimming	Women's 1500 m freestyle	July 25
Bronze	Sun Jiajun	Swimming	Men's 50 m breaststroke	July 26
Bronze	Li Bingjie; Li Jiaping; Ai Yanhan; Liu Yaxin; Yang Peiqi; Ge Chutong	Swimming	Women's 4 × 200 m freestyle relay	July 27
Bronze	Peng Xuwei	Swimming	Women's 200 m backstroke	July 29
Bronze	Xu Jiayu	Swimming	Men's 50 m backstroke	July 30
Bronze	Zhang Yufei	Swimming	Women's 50 m freestyle	July 30

Medals by sport
Sport	1st place, gold medalist(s)	2nd place, silver medalist(s)	3rd place, bronze medalist(s)	Total
Artistic swimming	3	1	1	5
Diving	12	4	3	19
Swimming	5	3	8	16

== Athletes by discipline ==
The following is the list of number of competitors participating at the Championships per discipline.

Sport	Men	Women	Total
Artistic swimming	1	10	11
Diving	9	9	18
Open water swimming	3*	4	7*
Swimming	19*	22	41*
Water polo	14	15	29
Total	45	60	105

- Zhang Ziyang was compete in both open water swimming and indoor swimming.

== Artistic swimming ==
Women

Athlete	Event	Preliminaries		Final	
Athlete	Event	Points	Rank	Points	Rank
Wang Liuyi; Wang Qianyi	Duet technical routine	280.3334	1 Q	249.4099	4
Wang Liuyi; Wang Qianyi	Duet free routine	184.7208	9 Q	255.2480	2nd place, silver medalist(s)

Mixed

Athlete	Event	Preliminaries		Final	
Athlete	Event	Points	Rank	Points	Rank
Cheng Wentao; Shi Haoyu	Duet technical routine	188.7334	7 Q	247.3033	3rd place, bronze medalist(s)
Cheng Wentao; Shi Haoyu	Duet free routine	221.1023	1 Q	225.1020	1st place, gold medalist(s)
Chang Hao; Cheng Wentao; Feng Yu; Shi Haoyu; Wang Ciyue; Xiang Binxuan; Xiao Yanning; Zhang Yayi	Team acrobatic routine	236.0733	1 Q	238.0033	1st place, gold medalist(s)
Chang Hao; Feng Yu; Wang Ciyue; Wang Liuyi; Wang Qianyi; Xiang Binxuan; Xiao Yanning; Zhang Yayi	Team technical routine	304.3992	1 Q	253.4558	7
Chang Hao; Feng Yu; Wang Ciyue; Wang Liuyi; Wang Qianyi; Xiang Binxuan; Xiao Yanning; Zhang Yayi	Team free routine	322.2731	1 Q	329.1687	1st place, gold medalist(s)

== Diving ==
China entered 18 divers.

Men

Athlete	Event	Preliminaries		Semifinals		Final	
Athlete	Event	Points	Rank	Points	Rank	Points	Rank
Lian Junjie	10 m platform	466.90	1 Q	505.50	1 Q	512.35	2nd place, silver medalist(s)
Long Daoyi	3 m springboard	452.75	3 Q	495.80	2 Q	499.75	3rd place, bronze medalist(s)
Peng Jianfeng	1 m springboard	403.75	1 Q	—N/a		440.45	1st place, gold medalist(s)
Wang Zongyuan	3 m springboard	500.95	1 Q	546.25	1 Q	538.10	1st place, gold medalist(s)
Yang Hao	10 m platform	465.95	2 Q	484.90	3 Q	504.00	3rd place, bronze medalist(s)
Zheng Jiuyuan	1 m springboard	371.65	5 Q	—N/a		418.30	3rd place, bronze medalist(s)
Long Daoyi; Wang Zongyuan	3 m synchronized springboard	451.44	1 Q	—N/a		456.33	1st place, gold medalist(s)
Lian Junjie; Yang Hao	10 m synchronized platform	463.65	1 Q	—N/a		477.75	1st place, gold medalist(s)

Women

Athlete	Event	Preliminaries		Semifinals		Final	
Athlete	Event	Points	Rank	Points	Rank	Points	Rank
Chang Yani	3 m springboard	303.60	4 Q	354.75	2 Q	341.50	2nd place, silver medalist(s)
Chen Yuxi	10 m platform	393.00	2 Q	430.05	2 Q	457.85	1st place, gold medalist(s)
Chen Yiwen	3 m springboard	355.00	1 Q	363.70	1 Q	359.50	1st place, gold medalist(s)
Quan Hongchan	10 m platform	435.60	1 Q	451.40	1 Q	445.60	2nd place, silver medalist(s)
Li Yajie	1 m springboard	283.35	2 Q	—N/a		306.35	2nd place, silver medalist(s)
Lin Shan	1 m springboard	291.25	1 Q	—N/a		318.60	1st place, gold medalist(s)
Chang Yani; Chen Yiwen	3 m synchronized springboard	327.42	1 Q	—N/a		341.94	1st place, gold medalist(s)
Chen Yuxi; Quan Hongchan	10 m synchronized platform	365.40	1 Q	—N/a		369.84	1st place, gold medalist(s)

Mixed

Athlete	Event	Final	
Athlete	Event	Points	Rank
Wang Feilong; Zhang Jiaqi	10 m synchronized platform	339.54	1st place, gold medalist(s)
Lin Shan; Zhu Zifeng	3 m synchronized springboard	326.10	1st place, gold medalist(s)
Bai Yuming; Zheng Jiuyuan; Si Yajie; Zhang Minjie	Team event	489.65	1st place, gold medalist(s)

== Open water swimming ==
China entered 7 open water swimmers.

Men

Athlete	Event	Time	Rank
Lan Tianchen	Men's 5 km	58:44.7	39
Lan Tianchen	Men's 10 km	2:00:37.5	41
Meng Rui	Men's 5 km	1:00:58.8	48
Zhang Ziyang	Men's 10 km	2:03:46.2	46

Women

Athlete	Event	Time	Rank
Ma Xiaoming	Women's 5 km	1:02:29.0	36
Sun Jiake	Women's 10 km	2:05:06.1	27
Wang Kexin	Women's 5 km	1:01:19.6	19
Wu Shutong	Women's 10 km	2:08:56.7	35

Mixed

Athlete	Event	Time	Rank
Meng Rui; Wang Kexin; Wu Shutong; Zhang Ziyang	Team relay	1:14:50.1	11

== Swimming ==
China entered 41 swimmers.

Men

Athlete	Event	Heat		Semifinal		Final	
Athlete	Event	Time	Rank	Time	Rank	Time	Rank
Chen Juner	50 m butterfly	23.79	35	Did not advance			
Chen Juner	200 m butterfly	1:56.87	19	Did not advance			
Dong Zhihao	200 m breaststroke	2:10.06	7 Q	2:08.47 WJ	4 Q	2:08.04 WJ	4
Fei Liwei	800 m freestyle	7:56.69	24	—N/a		Did not advance	
Fei Liwei	1500 m freestyle	14:57.50	12	—N/a		Did not advance	
Hong Jinquan	200 m freestyle	1:48.93	32	Did not advance			
Niu Guangsheng	200 m butterfly	1:55.69	9 Q	1:57.51	15	Did not advance	
Pan Zhanle	100 m freestyle	47.84	5 Q	47.61	3 Q	47.43 AS	4
Pan Zhanle	200 m freestyle	1:46.49	11 Q	1:46.05	10	Did not advance	
Sun Jiajun	50 m breaststroke	26.76	3 Q	26.78	3 Q	26.79	3rd place, bronze medalist(s)
Sun Jiajun	100 m butterfly	52.16	25	Did not advance			
Qin Haiyang	50 m breaststroke	26.34 AS	1 Q	26.20 AS	1 Q	26.29	1st place, gold medalist(s)
Qin Haiyang	100 m breaststroke	58.26 AS	1 Q	57.82 AS	1 Q	57.69 AS	1st place, gold medalist(s)
Qin Haiyang	200 m breaststroke	2:09.86	5 Q	2:07.70	2 Q	2:05.48 WR	1st place, gold medalist(s)
Tao Guannan	200 m backstroke	1:59.74	21	Did not advance			
Wang Changhao	50 m freestyle	22.50	38	Did not advance			
Wang Changhao	50 m butterfly	23.83	37	Did not advance			
Wang Changhao	100 m butterfly	51.78	18	Did not advance			
Wang Gukailai	50 m backstroke	25.29	23	Did not advance			
Wang Haoyu	100 m freestyle	48.64	22	Did not advance			
Wang Shun	200 m individual medley	1:59.05	16 Q	1:57.97	11	Did not advance	
Wang Shun	400 m individual medley	DSQ		—N/a		Did not advance	
Xu Jiayu	50 m backstroke	24.73	6 Q	24.41 NR	2 Q	24.50	3rd place, bronze medalist(s)
Xu Jiayu	100 m backstroke	52.87	1 Q	52.42	2 Q	52.64	4
Yan Zibei	100 m breaststroke	59.73	9 Q	59.02	4 Q	59.23	6
Zhang Ziyang	400 m freestyle	3:55.76	33	—N/a		Did not advance	
Pan Zhanle; Chen Juner; Wang Changhao; Wang Haoyu; Yang Jintong	4 × 100 m freestyle relay	3:13.54	5 Q	—N/a		3:11.38 AS	4
Ji Xinjie; Hong Jinquan; Zhang Ziyang; Wang Haoyu	4 × 200 m freestyle relay	7:09.99	11	—N/a		Did not advance	
Xu Jiayu; Qin Haiyang; Wang Changhao; Pan Zhanle; Yan Zibei; Sun Jiajun; Wang Haoyu	4 × 100 m medley relay	3:31.89	4 Q	—N/a		3:29.00 AS	2nd place, silver medalist(s)

Women

Athlete	Event	Heat		Semifinal		Final	
Athlete	Event	Time	Rank	Time	Rank	Time	Rank
Cheng Yujie	50 m freestyle	24.86	15 Q	24.56	5 Q	24.45	6
Cheng Yujie	100 m freestyle	54.11	8 Q	53.92	10	Did not advance	
Gao Weizhong	1500 m freestyle	16:12.94	11	—N/a		Did not advance	
Ge Chutong	400 m individual medley	4:41.87	12	—N/a		Did not advance	
Li Bingjie	400 m freestyle	4:04.98	8 Q	—N/a		4:01.65	5
Li Bingjie	800 m freestyle	8:20.51	2 Q	—N/a		8:13.31 AS	2nd place, silver medalist(s)
Li Bingjie	1500 m freestyle	15:58.81	4 Q	—N/a		15:45.71	3rd place, bronze medalist(s)
Li Jiaping	200 m freestyle	1:58.26	17	Did not advance			
Liu Yaxin	200 m freestyle	1:56.93	6 Q	1:56.34	7 Q	1:56.97	8
Liu Yaxin	200 m backstroke	2:13.42	21	Did not advance			
Ma Yonghui	400 m freestyle	4:10.64	17	—N/a		Did not advance	
Peng Xuwei	200 m backstroke	2:08.68	2 Q	2:07.40	1 Q	2:06.74	3rd place, bronze medalist(s)
Tang Qianting	50 m breaststroke	30.08 AS	4 Q	30.12	5	30.22	6
Tang Qianting	100 m breaststroke	1:07.15	20	Did not advance			
Wan Letian	50 m backstroke	27.84	7 Q	27.74; 27.90	8 S/off; 2	Did not advance	
Wan Letian	100 m backstroke	59.52	5 Q	59.49	7 Q	1:00.39	8
Wang Xueer	50 m backstroke	27.89	9 Q	27.74; 27.78	8 S/off; 1 Q	27.99	7
Wang Xueer	100 m backstroke	59.93	8 Q	59.96	13	Did not advance	
Wang Yichun	100 m butterfly	57.72	7 Q	57.74	11	Did not advance	
Yang Chang	50 m breaststroke	30.85	18	Did not advance			
Yang Chang	100 m breaststroke	1:07.28	21	Did not advance			
Yang Peiqi	800 m freestyle	8:37.16	20	—N/a		Did not advance	
Yang Junxuan	100 m freestyle	54.45	12 Q	53.67	8 Q	54.09	8
Ye Shiwen	200 m breaststroke	2:25.93	11 Q	2:24.76	10	Did not advance	
Ye Shiwen	200 m individual medley	2:09.81	7 Q	2:10.57	7 Q	2:14.27	8
Yu Liyan	200 m butterfly	2:09.29	10 Q	2:08.78	11	Did not advance	
Yu Yiting	50 m butterfly	26.21	14 Q	26.27	16	Did not advance	
Yu Yiting	200 m individual medley	2:09.66	5 Q	2:09.04	2 Q	2:08.74	3rd place, bronze medalist(s)
Yu Yiting	400 m individual medley	4:41.84	11	—N/a		Did not advance	
Zhang Yufei	50 m freestyle	24.44	4 Q	24.20	3 Q	24.15	3rd place, bronze medalist(s)
Zhang Yufei	50 m butterfly	25.33	2 Q	25.17 NR	2 Q	25.05 AS	2nd place, silver medalist(s)
Zhang Yufei	100 m butterfly	56.89	1 Q	56.40	1 Q	56.12	1st place, gold medalist(s)
Zhang Yufei	200 m butterfly	Did not start					
Cheng Yujie; Yang Junxuan; Wu Qingfeng; Zhang Yufei; Ai Yanhan; Zhu Menghui	4 × 100 m freestyle relay	3:36.26	5 Q	—N/a		3:32.40 AS	3rd place, bronze medalist(s)
Li Bingjie; Li Jiaping; Ai Yanhan; Liu Yaxin; Yang Peiqi; Ge Chutong	4 × 200 m freestyle relay	7:51.55	4 Q	—N/a		7:44.40	3rd place, bronze medalist(s)
Wan Letian; Tang Qianting; Zhang Yufei; Cheng Yujie; Wang Xueer; Yang Chang; Wang Yichun; Wu Qingfeng	4 × 100 m medley relay	3:58.13	6 Q	—N/a		3:54.57	4

Mixed

Athlete	Event	Heat		Final	
Athlete	Event	Time	Rank	Time	Rank
Yang Jintong; Ji Yicun; Yang Junxuan; Wu Qingfeng	4 × 100 m freestyle relay	3:27.08	9	Did not advance	
Xu Jiayu; Qin Haiyang; Zhang Yufei; Cheng Yujie; Yan Zibei; Wang Yichun; Wu Qingfeng	4 × 100 m medley relay	3:42.49	4 Q	3:38.57	1st place, gold medalist(s)

== Water polo ==
Summary

Team	Event	Group stage				Playoff	Quarterfinal	Semifinal	Final / BM	
Team	Event	Opposition Score	Opposition Score	Opposition Score	Rank	Opposition Score	Opposition Score	Opposition Score	Opposition Score	Rank
China	Men's tournament	Canada; L 10–13	France; L 8–17	Italy; L 5–18	4	—N/a	—N/a	Kazakhstan; L 5–12	South Africa; W 16–8	15
China	Women's tournament	United States; L 6–15	France; L 11–12	Australia; L 7–11	4	—N/a	—N/a	Kazakhstan; W 16–6	Japan; W 18–10	13

=== Men's tournament ===
Team roster

The following is the Chinese roster.

Head coach: Petar Porobić

- 1 Wu Honghui GK
- 2 Hu Zhangxin FP
- 3 Chu Chenghao FP
- 4 Peng Jiahao FP
- 5 Zhang Jinpeng FP
- 6 Xie Zekai FP
- 7 Chen Zhongxian FP
- 8 Chen Rui FP
- 9 Chen Yimin FP
- 10 Liu Yu FP
- 11 Zhang Chufeng FP
- 12 Shen Dingsong FP
- 13 Liang Zhiwei GK
- Li Lun FP

Group play

Pos	Team	Pld	W	PSW	PSL	L	GF	GA	GD	Pts	Qualification
1	Italy	3	3	0	0	0	55	17	+38	9	Quarterfinals
2	France	3	2	0	0	1	38	32	+6	6	Playoffs
3	Canada	3	1	0	0	2	30	49	−19	3	Playoffs
4	China	3	0	0	0	3	23	48	−25	0	

Source: Sportresult
Rules for classification: 1) points; 2) head-to-head points; 3) head-to-head goal difference; 4) head-to-head number of goals scored; 5) Goal difference.

17 July 2023; 12:00	Report	Canada	13–10	China	Marine Messe Fukuoka, Fukuoka; Referees: Tamás Kovács-Csatlós (HUN), Nenad Peris (CRO)
17 July 2023; 12:00	Report	Score by quarters: 4–0, 3–6, 4–4, 2–0			Marine Messe Fukuoka, Fukuoka; Referees: Tamás Kovács-Csatlós (HUN), Nenad Peris (CRO)
17 July 2023; 12:00	Report	Constantin-Bicari, Gardijan 3	Goals	Peng 4	Marine Messe Fukuoka, Fukuoka; Referees: Tamás Kovács-Csatlós (HUN), Nenad Peris (CRO)

19 July 2023; 10:30	Report	China	8–17	France	Marine Messe Fukuoka, Fukuoka; Referees: Michiel Zwartt (NED), Veselin Mišković (MNE)
19 July 2023; 10:30	Report	Score by quarters: 1–4, 4–6, 0–4, 3–3			Marine Messe Fukuoka, Fukuoka; Referees: Michiel Zwartt (NED), Veselin Mišković (MNE)
19 July 2023; 10:30	Report	Chen R., Xie 2	Goals	Marzouki 4	Marine Messe Fukuoka, Fukuoka; Referees: Michiel Zwartt (NED), Veselin Mišković (MNE)

21 July 2023; 17:30	Report	China	5–18	Italy	Marine Messe Fukuoka, Fukuoka; Referees: Veselin Mišković (MNE), Germán Moller (ARG)
21 July 2023; 17:30	Report	Score by quarters: 2–2, 1–7, 2–6, 0–3			Marine Messe Fukuoka, Fukuoka; Referees: Veselin Mišković (MNE), Germán Moller (ARG)
21 July 2023; 17:30	Report	Chen Z. 2	Goals	Condemi, Di Fulvio 4	Marine Messe Fukuoka, Fukuoka; Referees: Veselin Mišković (MNE), Germán Moller (ARG)

13–16th place semifinals

23 July 2023; 09:00	Report	Kazakhstan	12–5	China	Marine Messe Fukuoka, Fukuoka; Referees: Chisato Kurosaki (JPN), Vojin Putniković (SRB)
23 July 2023; 09:00	Report	Score by quarters: 1–1, 4–0, 3–1, 4–3			Marine Messe Fukuoka, Fukuoka; Referees: Chisato Kurosaki (JPN), Vojin Putniković (SRB)
23 July 2023; 09:00	Report	Markovich 4	Goals	Xie Z. 3	Marine Messe Fukuoka, Fukuoka; Referees: Chisato Kurosaki (JPN), Vojin Putniković (SRB)

15th place game

25 July 2023; 09:00	Report	China	16–8	South Africa	Marine Messe Fukuoka, Fukuoka; Referees: Germán Moller (ARG), Hélène Painchaud (CAN)
25 July 2023; 09:00	Report	Score by quarters: 3–2, 4–2, 4–1, 5–3			Marine Messe Fukuoka, Fukuoka; Referees: Germán Moller (ARG), Hélène Painchaud (CAN)
25 July 2023; 09:00	Report	Chen Z. 7	Goals	Badenhorst, Howard 2	Marine Messe Fukuoka, Fukuoka; Referees: Germán Moller (ARG), Hélène Painchaud (CAN)

=== Women's tournament ===
Team roster

The following is the Chinese roster.

Head coach: Theocharis Pavlidis

- 1 Zhang Jiaqi GK
- 2 Yan Siya FP
- 3 Yan Jing FP
- 4 Xiong Dunhan FP
- 5 Zhai Ying FP
- 6 Wang Shiyun FP
- 7 Lu Yiwen FP
- 8 Wang Huan FP
- 9 Deng Zewen FP
- 10 Nong Sanfeng FP
- 11 Chen Xiao FP
- 12 Zhang Jing FP
- 13 Dong Wenxin GK
- Wang Xuan FP
- Zhong Qiyun FP

Group play

Pos	Team	Pld	W	PSW	PSL	L	GF	GA	GD	Pts	Qualification
1	United States	3	3	0	0	0	40	16	+24	9	Quarterfinals
2	Australia	3	2	0	0	1	26	24	+2	6	Playoffs
3	France	3	1	0	0	2	25	37	−12	3	Playoffs
4	China	3	0	0	0	3	24	38	−14	0	

Source: Sportresult
Rules for classification: 1) points; 2) head-to-head points; 3) head-to-head goal difference; 4) head-to-head number of goals scored; 5) Goal difference.

16 July 2023; 09:00	Report	United States	15–6	China	Marine Messe Fukuoka, Fukuoka; Referees: Nóra Debreceni (HUN), Frank Ohme (GER)
16 July 2023; 09:00	Report	Score by quarters: 1–0, 6–2, 3–1, 5–3			Marine Messe Fukuoka, Fukuoka; Referees: Nóra Debreceni (HUN), Frank Ohme (GER)
16 July 2023; 09:00	Report	Musselman 4	Goals	Zhang Jin. 3	Marine Messe Fukuoka, Fukuoka; Referees: Nóra Debreceni (HUN), Frank Ohme (GER)

18 July 2023; 20:30	Report	China	11–12	France	Marine Messe Fukuoka, Fukuoka; Referees: Tamás Kovács-Csatlós (HUN), Alessia Ferrari (ITA)
18 July 2023; 20:30	Report	Score by quarters: 4–3, 1–3, 4–1, 2–5			Marine Messe Fukuoka, Fukuoka; Referees: Tamás Kovács-Csatlós (HUN), Alessia Ferrari (ITA)
18 July 2023; 20:30	Report	Wang H. 3	Goals	Dhalluin 4	Marine Messe Fukuoka, Fukuoka; Referees: Tamás Kovács-Csatlós (HUN), Alessia Ferrari (ITA)

20 July 2023; 13:00	Report	China	7–11	Australia	Marine Messe Fukuoka, Fukuoka; Referees: Raffaele Colombo (ITA), Hélène Painchaud (CAN)
20 July 2023; 13:00	Report	Score by quarters: 1–4, 3–2, 1–3, 2–2			Marine Messe Fukuoka, Fukuoka; Referees: Raffaele Colombo (ITA), Hélène Painchaud (CAN)
20 July 2023; 13:00	Report	Lu, Zhang Jin. 2	Goals	five players 2	Marine Messe Fukuoka, Fukuoka; Referees: Raffaele Colombo (ITA), Hélène Painchaud (CAN)

13–16th place semifinals

22 July 2023; 09:00	Report	China	16–6	Kazakhstan	Marine Messe Fukuoka, Fukuoka; Referees: Jennifer McCall (USA), Hélène Painchaud (CAN)
22 July 2023; 09:00	Report	Score by quarters: 3–1, 6–2, 3–2, 4–1			Marine Messe Fukuoka, Fukuoka; Referees: Jennifer McCall (USA), Hélène Painchaud (CAN)
22 July 2023; 09:00	Report	Yan S., Zhang J. 4	Goals	Kaplun 3	Marine Messe Fukuoka, Fukuoka; Referees: Jennifer McCall (USA), Hélène Painchaud (CAN)

13th place game

24 July 2023; 10:30	Report	China	18–10	Japan	Marine Messe Fukuoka, Fukuoka; Referees: Adil Aimbetov (KAZ), Lee-Anne Stewart (RSA)
24 July 2023; 10:30	Report	Score by quarters: 4–3, 5–3, 4–3, 5–1			Marine Messe Fukuoka, Fukuoka; Referees: Adil Aimbetov (KAZ), Lee-Anne Stewart (RSA)
24 July 2023; 10:30	Report	Lu, Yan J. 3	Goals	Ura 3	Marine Messe Fukuoka, Fukuoka; Referees: Adil Aimbetov (KAZ), Lee-Anne Stewart (RSA)
