= Georgia at the 2022 World Aquatics Championships =

- Flag of Georgia (country)
- FINA code: GEO
- National federation: Georgian Swimming Federation

in Gwangju, South Korea
- Competitors: 18 in 3 sports
- Medals: Gold 0 Silver 0 Bronze 0 Total 0

World Aquatics Championships appearances
- 1994; 1998; 2001; 2003; 2005; 2007; 2009; 2011; 2013; 2015; 2017; 2019; 2022; 2023; 2024

Other related appearances
- Soviet Union (1973–1991)

Georgia competed at the 2022 World Aquatics Championships in Budapest, Hungary from 17 June to 3 July.

== Diving ==
Georgia's diving team consisted of 3 athletes (3 male).

Men

Athlete	Event	Preliminaries		Semifinals		Final	
Athlete	Event	Points	Rank	Points	Rank	Points	Rank
Sandro Melikidze	3 m springboard	302.05	41	did not advance			
Tornike Onikashvili	1 m springboard	259.90	40	—		did not advance	
Tornike Onikashvili	3 m springboard	284.25	43	did not advance			
Irakli Sakandelidze	1 m springboard	230.20	47	—		did not advance	
Sandro Melikidze; Tornike Onikashvili	Synchronized 3 m springboard	316.95	14	—		did not advance	

== Swimming ==
Georgia entered two swimmers.

Men

Athlete	Event	Heat		Semifinal		Final	
Athlete	Event	Time	Rank	Time	Rank	Time	Rank
Luka Kukhalashvili	100 m freestyle	51.49	57	did not advance			
Luka Kukhalashvili	200 m freestyle	1:53.08	47	did not advance			
Irakli Revishvili	400 m freestyle	4:02.01	35	—		did not advance	

== Water polo ==
Summary

Key:
- FT – After full time.
- P – Match decided by penalty-shootout.

Team	Event	Group stage				Playoff	Quarterfinal	Semifinals	Final	
Team	Event	Opposition Score	Opposition Score	Opposition Score	Rank	Opposition Score	Opposition Score	Opposition Score	Opposition Score	Rank
Georgia men's	Men's tournament	Brazil; W 14–10	Montenegro; L 9–10	Hungary; W 18–14	3	Croatia; L 7–13	—	9–12th place semifinals South Africa; W 20–7	Ninth place game Japan; L 15–16	10

=== Men's tournament ===
Team roster

The following is Georgian roster in the Water polo at the 2022 World Aquatics Championships – Men's tournament.

Head coach: (Serbia) Dejan Stanojević

- 1 Irakli Razmadze GK
- 2 Sandro Adeishvili D
- 3 Valiko Dadvani FP
- 4 Nika Shushiashvili FP
- 5 Andria Bitadze CF
- 6 Marko Jelaca FP
- 7 Khvicha Jakhaia CB
- 8 Jovan Sarić FP
- 9 Revaz Imnaishvili FP
- 10 Boris Vapenski FP
- 11 Fabio Baraldi CB
- 12 Dušan Vasić FP
- 13 Nikoloz Shubladze GK

Group play

Pos	Team	Pld	W	D	L	GF	GA	GD	Pts	Qualification
1	Hungary (H)	3	3	0	0	50	28	+22	6	Quarterfinals
2	Montenegro	3	2	0	1	38	26	+12	4	Playoffs
3	Georgia	3	1	0	2	37	38	−1	2	Playoffs
4	Brazil	3	0	0	3	21	54	−33	0	

Source: Sportresult
Rules for classification: 1) points; 2) head-to-head points; 3) head-to-head goal difference; 4) head-to-head number of goals scored; 5) Goal difference.
(H) Hosts

21 June 2022; 19:30	Report	Brazil	10–14	Georgia	Alfréd Hajós National Swimming Stadium, Budapest; Referees: Maro Savinović (CRO), Dion Willis (RSA)
21 June 2022; 19:30	Report	Score by quarters: 2–2, 3–3, 3–6, 2–3			Alfréd Hajós National Swimming Stadium, Budapest; Referees: Maro Savinović (CRO), Dion Willis (RSA)
21 June 2022; 19:30	Report	Freitas 4	Goals	Sarić, Vapenski 4	Alfréd Hajós National Swimming Stadium, Budapest; Referees: Maro Savinović (CRO), Dion Willis (RSA)

23 June 2022; 19:30	Report	Georgia	9–10	Montenegro	Alfréd Hajós National Swimming Stadium, Budapest; Referees: Pascal Bouchez (FRA), Maro Savinović (CRO)
23 June 2022; 19:30	Report	Score by quarters: 1–4, 3–0, 3–4, 2–2			Alfréd Hajós National Swimming Stadium, Budapest; Referees: Pascal Bouchez (FRA), Maro Savinović (CRO)
23 June 2022; 19:30	Report	Vasić 5	Goals	Đurđić 4	Alfréd Hajós National Swimming Stadium, Budapest; Referees: Pascal Bouchez (FRA), Maro Savinović (CRO)

25 June 2022; 21:00	Report	Hungary	18–14	Georgia	Alfréd Hajós National Swimming Stadium, Budapest; Referees: Dion Willis (RSA), Pascal Bouchez (FRA)
25 June 2022; 21:00	Report	Score by quarters: 3–3, 7–3, 4–5, 4–3			Alfréd Hajós National Swimming Stadium, Budapest; Referees: Dion Willis (RSA), Pascal Bouchez (FRA)
25 June 2022; 21:00	Report	Manhercz, Zalánki 4	Goals	Shushiashvili, Vapenski 3	Alfréd Hajós National Swimming Stadium, Budapest; Referees: Dion Willis (RSA), Pascal Bouchez (FRA)

Playoffs

27 June 2022; 15:30	Report	Georgia	7–13	Croatia	Alfréd Hajós National Swimming Stadium, Budapest; Referees: Boris Margeta (SLO), György Kun (HUN)
27 June 2022; 15:30	Report	Score by quarters: 2–3, 2–4, 0–3, 3–3			Alfréd Hajós National Swimming Stadium, Budapest; Referees: Boris Margeta (SLO), György Kun (HUN)
27 June 2022; 15:30	Report	Vapenski, Vasić 2	Goals	Kharkov 4	Alfréd Hajós National Swimming Stadium, Budapest; Referees: Boris Margeta (SLO), György Kun (HUN)

9–12th place semifinals

29 June 2022; 18:30	Report	Georgia	20–7	South Africa	Szeged Tiszavirág Pool, Szeged; Referees: Radu Matache (ROU), Anbar Anbar (KUW)
29 June 2022; 18:30	Report	Score by quarters: 3–1, 5–1, 7–2, 5–3			Szeged Tiszavirág Pool, Szeged; Referees: Radu Matache (ROU), Anbar Anbar (KUW)
29 June 2022; 18:30	Report	three players 3	Goals	Olver 2	Szeged Tiszavirág Pool, Szeged; Referees: Radu Matache (ROU), Anbar Anbar (KUW)

Ninth place game

1 July 2022; 18:30	Report	Japan	16–15	Georgia	Szeged Tiszavirág Pool, Szeged; Referees: Veselin Mišković (MNE), Ivan Raković (SRB)
1 July 2022; 18:30	Report	Score by quarters: 3–5, 7–4, 2–2, 4–4			Szeged Tiszavirág Pool, Szeged; Referees: Veselin Mišković (MNE), Ivan Raković (SRB)
1 July 2022; 18:30	Report	Adachi 5	Goals	Bitadze, Vapenski 4	Szeged Tiszavirág Pool, Szeged; Referees: Veselin Mišković (MNE), Ivan Raković (SRB)
