= Georgia at the 2021 Summer World University Games =

- Flag of Georgia
- IOC code: GEO

in Chengdu, China 28 July 2023 – 8 August 2023
- Competitors: 27 (27 men)
- Medals Ranked 45th: Gold 0 Silver 0 Bronze 4 Total 4

Summer World University Games appearances
- 1959; 1961; 1963; 1965; 1967; 1970; 1973; 1975; 1977; 1979; 1981; 1983; 1985; 1987; 1989; 1991; 1993; 1995; 1997; 1999; 2001; 2003; 2005; 2007; 2009; 2011; 2013; 2015; 2017; 2019; 2021; 2025; 2027

Georgia competed at the 2021 Summer World University Games in Chengdu, China held from 28 July to 8 August 2023.

== Medal summary ==
=== Medal by sports ===
Rank	Sports	Gold	Silver	Bronze	Total
1	Judo	0	0	2	2
2	Diving	0	0	1	1
2	Water polo	0	0	1	1
Totals (3 entries)		0	0	4	4

=== Medalists ===
Medal	Name	Sport	Event	Day
Bronze	Zaur Dvalashvili	Judo	Men's -81 kg	30 July
Bronze	Tornike Onikashvili; Sandro Melikidze	Diving	Men's synchronized 3 metre springboard	31 July
Bronze	Irakli Demetrashvili	Judo	Men's +100 kg	31 July
Bronze	Irakli Razmadze; Saba Tkeshelashvili; Valiko Dadvani; Nika Shushiashvili; Andria Bitadze; Sandro Adeishvili; Khvicha Jakhaia / Besarion Akhvlediani; Revaz Imnaishvili; Giorgi Magrakvelidze; Giorgi Meskhi; Artsiom Dzikhtsiarenka; Giorgi Gvetadze	Water polo	Men's tournament	8 August
