= Water polo at the 2021 Summer World University Games =

Water polo at the Chengdu 2021 FISU World University Games
- Venue: Xindu District Sports Centre Natatorium; Modern Pentathlon Centre Swimming & Fencing Hall; Dong'an Lake Sports Park Aquatics Arena (finals)
- Dates: 27 July–8 August 2023
- Teams: 11 (men) & 6 (women)

Water polo at the 2021 Summer World University Games in Chengdu was played from 27 July to 8 August 2023. The dates of all events were changed due to the COVID-19 pandemic. 17 teams participated in the tournament.

== Qualification ==
Following the FISU regulations, there were a maximum of 12 teams in men's water polo and 10 in women's water polo. If there was a larger number of teams interested, they were selected by:

- The entry and the payment of guarantee
- Those five teams finishing top rankings of the previous edition will be automatically qualified.
- Those three teams finishing bottom rankings of the previous edition could be replaced by new applying teams.
- The host is automatically qualified.
- The remaining teams will be selected by wild card system according to geographical, continental representation, FISU ranking and WA ranking.

== Medal summary ==
=== Medal table ===
Rank	Nation	Gold	Silver	Bronze	Total
1	Italy (ITA)	1	1	0	2
2	China (CHN)*	1	0	0	1
3	Hungary (HUN)	0	1	0	1
4	Australia (AUS)	0	0	1	1
4	Georgia (GEO)	0	0	1	1
Totals (5 entries)		2	2	2	6

Source: Medal&Rank

=== Medal events ===
Event	Gold	Silver	Bronze
Men	Italy (ITA); Alessandro Vitale; Julien Lanfranco; Stefano Guerrato; Francesco Faraglia; Eduardo Campopiano; Federico Panerai; Francesco De Michelis; Pietro Faraglia; Davide Occhione; Mario Guid; Danjel Podgornik; Mario Del Basso; Nicolo' Da Rold	Hungary (HUN); Márton Mizsei; Bendegúz Kevi; Zsombor Szeghalmi; Benedek Baksa; Botond Bóbis; György Ágh; Döme Dala; Máté Aranyi; Balázs Nyíri; Bendegúz Ekler; Péter Sugár; Benedek Batizi; Benedek Danka	Georgia (GEO); Irakli Razmadze; Saba Tkeshelashvili; Valiko Dadvani; Nika Shushiashvili; Andria Bitadze; Sandro Adeishvili; Khvicha Jakhaia; Besarion Akhvlediani; Revaz Imnaishvili; Giorgi Magrakvelidze; Giorgi Meskhi; Artsiom Dzikhtsiarenka; Giorgi Gvetadze
Women	China (CHN); Dong Wenxin; Yan Siya; Pan Xiuhua; Xiong Dunhan; Zhai Ying; Wang Shiyun; Lu Yiwen; Wang Huan; Zhong Qiyun; Nong Sanfeng; Chen Xiao; Zhang Jing; Du Xinyue	Italy (ITA); Valeria Uccella; Francesca Sapienza; Anna Repetto; Sara Cordovani; Chiara Ranalli; Gaia Gagliardi; Letizia Nesti; Luna Di Claudio; Cecilia Nardini; Carlotta Meggiato; Elena Altamura; Sara Caros; Giorgia Galbani	Australia (AUS); Isobelle Pamp; Mia Glasel; Lucinda Marsh; Camilla MacKay; Emily Fitzgerald; Indigo Ditterick; Eleanor Campbell; Lucinda Gillis; Grace Coleman; Madissyn Powells; Savannah Henshaw; Victoria Ridhalgh

== Draw ==
Men's tournament		Women's tournament
Pool A	Pool B	Round robin
Hungary	China	China
Greece	Italy	Italy
Germany	Georgia	Australia
Japan	Slovakia	Japan
Singapore	United States	South Africa
	South Korea	Singapore
