= Georgia at the 2025 World Aquatics Championships =

- Flag of Georgia
- World Aquatics code: GEO
- National federation: Georgian Aquatic Sports National Federation

in Singapore
- Competitors: 11 in 3 sports
- Medals: Gold 0 Silver 0 Bronze 0 Total 0

World Aquatics Championships appearances
- 1994; 1998; 2001; 2003; 2005; 2007; 2009; 2011; 2013; 2015; 2017; 2019; 2022; 2023; 2024; 2025

Other related appearances
- Soviet Union (1973–1991)

Georgia competed at the 2025 World Aquatics Championships in Singapore from July 11 to August 3, 2025.

== Competitors ==
The following is the list of competitors in the Championships.

Sport	Men	Women	Total
Artistic swimming	0	3	3
Diving	3	2	5
Swimming	2	1	3
Total	5	6	11

== Artistic swimming ==
Women

Athlete	Event	Preliminaries		Final	
Athlete	Event	Points	Rank	Points	Rank
Mari Alavidze	Solo technical routine	232.0834	13	Did not advance	
Mari Alavidze	Solo free routine	213.2687	11 Q	220.9438	9
Tekla Gogilidze; Nita Natobadzel	Duet technical routine	229.9192	26	Did not advance	
Tekla Gogilidze; Nita Natobadzel	Duet free routine	218.3351	16	Did not advance	

== Diving ==
Men

Athlete	Event	Preliminaries		Semifinals		Final	
Athlete	Event	Points	Rank	Points	Rank	Points	Rank
Tornike Onikashvili	1 m springboard	292.30	38	—		Did not advance	
Tornike Onikashvili	3 m springboard	318.65	50	Did not advance			
Aleksandre Tskhomelidze	1 m springboard	248.40	54	—		Did not advance	
Giorgi Tsulukidze	3 m springboard	265.45	61	Did not advance			
Giorgi Tsulukidze; Aleksandre Tskhomelidze	3 m synchro springboard	291.42	24	—		Did not advance	

Women

Athlete	Event	Preliminaries		Semifinals		Final	
Athlete	Event	Points	Rank	Points	Rank	Points	Rank
Mariam Shanidze	1 m springboard	Did not start		—		Did not advance	
Mariam Shanidze	3 m springboard	195.85	45	Did not advance			
Mariam Shanidze; Tekle Sharia	3 m synchro springboard	160.53	22	—		Did not advance	

== Swimming ==
Georgia entered 3 swimmers.

Men

Athlete	Event	Heat		Semi-final		Final	
Athlete	Event	Time	Rank	Time	Rank	Time	Rank
Noe Pantskhava	50 m backstroke	25.82	45	Did not advance			
Noe Pantskhava	100 m backstroke	56.72	47	Did not advance			
Nika Tchitchiashvili	50 m butterfly	25.29	61	Did not advance			
Nika Tchitchiashvili	100 m butterfly	56.42	59	Did not advance			

Women

Athlete	Event	Heat		Semi-final		Final	
Athlete	Event	Time	Rank	Time	Rank	Time	Rank
Anna Kalandadze	800 m freestyle	8:55.29	28	—		Did not advance	
Anna Kalandadze	1500 m freestyle	16:55.47	24	—		Did not advance	
