= 2026 Men's European Water Polo Championship squads =

This article shows all participating team squads at the 2026 Men's European Water Polo Championship held from 10 to 25 January in Belgrade, Serbia.

Age and club as of the first day of the tournament, 9 January 2026.

== Group A ==
=== France ===
Head coach: (Croatia) Vjekoslav Kobešćak

Name	Date of birth	Pos.	Club
Julien Offner	16 December 1999 (aged 26)	GK	(France) USB Bordeaux
Kilian Braise Fernandez	4 July 2007 (aged 18)	W	(France) Pays d'Aix Natation
Luca Barnat	8 February 2007 (aged 18)	CF	(France) AS Monaco Natation
Alexandre Bouet	5 December 2000 (aged 25)	W	(France) CN Marseille
Alexis Drahe	15 December 2003 (aged 22)	DF	(France) Pays d'Aix Natation
Thomas Vernoux (C)	21 March 2002 (aged 23)	W	(France) CN Marseille
Steven Vitrant	27 October 1997 (aged 28)	W	(France) Team Strasbourg
Denis Guerin	8 January 2002 (aged 24)	DF	(France) Taverny SN 95
Romain Marion-Vernoux	2 January 2000 (aged 26)	W	(France) CN Marseille
Lorris Canovas	7 February 2001 (aged 24)	W	(France) Team Strasbourg
Enzo Nardon	6 January 2003 (aged 23)	W	(France) Taverny SN 95
Jean-Baptiste Carpentras	12 April 2002 (aged 23)	DF	(France) Olympic Nice Natation
Hugo Fontani	22 December 1994 (aged 31)	GK	(France) Team Strasbourg
Mathis Mas	13 May 2004 (aged 21)	CF	(France) Team Strasbourg
Tom Sauton	4 October 2002 (aged 23)	W	(France) Sete Natation

=== Hungary ===
The squad was announced on 6 January 2026.

Head coach: Zsolt Varga

Name	Date of birth	Pos.	Club
Csoma Kristóf	26 January 1992 (aged 33)	GK	(Hungary) Budapesti Honvéd SE
Dániel Angyal	29 March 1992 (aged 33)	DF	(Greece) Olympiacos Piraeus
Krisztián Manhercz (C)	6 February 1997 (aged 28)	W	(Hungary) FTC-Telekom
Nagy Ákos	15 April 2004 (aged 21)	W	(Hungary) FTC-Telekom
Vince Vigvári	23 June 2003 (aged 22)	W	(Spain) CN Barcelona
Ádám Nagy	19 May 1998 (aged 27)	DF	(France) CN Marseille
Gergő Fekete	24 June 2000 (aged 25)	W	(Hungary) FTC-Telekom
Tátrai Dávid	15 August 2003 (aged 22)	W	(Hungary) BVSC Manna ABC
Péter Kovács	16 May 1991 (aged 34)	CF	(Hungary) BVSC Manna ABC
Vigvári Vendel	10 September 2001 (aged 24)	W	(Hungary) FTC-Telekom
Szilárd Jansik	6 April 1994 (aged 31)	W	(Hungary) FTC-Telekom
Benedek Batizi	21 August 2001 (aged 24)	CF	(Hungary) BVSC Manna ABC
Soma Vogel	7 July 1997 (aged 28)	GK	(Hungary) FTC-Telekom
Vismeg Zsombor	14 March 2003 (aged 22)	DF	(Hungary) FTC-Telekom
Vince Varga	16 August 2005 (aged 20)	W	(Hungary) FTC-Telekom

=== Malta ===
Head coach: (Montenegro) Milan Ćirović

Name	Date of birth	Pos.	Club
Jake Tanti	12 June 1998 (aged 27)	GK	(Spain) CN Mataro
Ivan Nagaev	30 November 1993 (aged 32)	W	(Croatia) HAVK Mladost
Liam Galea	28 November 2001 (aged 24)	DF	(Malta) Sliema ASC
Ben Plumpton	16 February 1998 (aged 27)	DF	(Malta) San Giljian ASC
Benjamin Cachia	12 February 2002 (aged 23)	DF	(Malta) Sliema ASC
Matthew Zammit	1 October 1987 (aged 38)	CF	(Malta) San Giljian ASC
Stevie Camilleri (C)	4 July 1987 (aged 38)	W	(Malta) Neptunes WPSC
Jayden Cutajar	22 August 2007 (aged 18)	W	(Serbia) VK Partizan
Jake Muscat	8 February 2003 (aged 22)	W	(Italy) Telimar Palermo
Nikolai Zammit	19 April 2001 (aged 24)	W	(Malta) San Giljian ASC
Darren Zammit	1 January 1999 (aged 27)	GK	(Malta) San Giljian ASC
Alec Fenech	8 November 2005 (aged 20)	W	(Romania) CSA Steaua București
Nicholas Grixti	13 October 1995 (aged 30)	GK	(Malta) Sirens ASC
Elijah Schembri	24 February 2006 (aged 19)	DF	(Malta) Sliema ASC
Jake Bonavia	23 March 2003 (aged 22)	W	(Malta) San Giljian ASC

=== Montenegro ===
The squad was announced on 6 January 2026.

Head coach: (Serbia) Dejan Savić

Name	Date of birth	Pos.	Club
Petar Tešanović (C)	26 November 1998 (aged 27)	GK	(France) CN Marseille
Dmitrii Kholod	16 January 1992 (aged 33)	W	(Montenegro) Jadran m:tel Herceg Novi
Jovan Vujović	20 January 2003 (aged 22)	CF	(Montenegro) Jadran m:tel Herceg Novi
Marko Mrsić	2 January 2003 (aged 23)	W	(Montenegro) VK Primorac Kotor
Aljoša Macic	31 October 2000 (aged 25)	DF	(Serbia) VK Šabac Elixir
Vlado Popadić	25 April 1996 (aged 29)	W	(Italy) AN Brescia
Danilo Stupar	9 April 2007 (aged 18)	W	(Montenegro) Jadran m:tel Herceg Novi
Balša Vučković	14 April 2005 (aged 20)	DF	(Montenegro) VK Primorac Kotor
Miroslav Perković	15 March 2001 (aged 24)	CF	(Serbia) VK Novi Beograd
Vladan Spaić	18 June 1997 (aged 28)	CF	(France) CN Marseille
Dušan Matković	1 February 1999 (aged 26)	W	(Croatia) VK Jadran Split
Vasilije Radović	12 May 2003 (aged 22)	DF	(Montenegro) Jadran m:tel Herceg Novi
Darko Durović	29 April 2000 (aged 25)	GK	(Serbia) VK Šabac Elixir
Srdan Janović	14 November 2006 (aged 19)	W	(Montenegro) Jadran m:tel Herceg Novi
Strahinja Gojković	15 March 2007 (aged 18)	W	(Montenegro) Jadran m:tel Herceg Novi

== Group B ==
=== Croatia ===
The squad was announced on 5 January 2025.

Head coach: Ivica Tucak

Name	Date of birth	Pos.	Club
Marko Bijač (C)	12 January 1991 (aged 34)	GK	(Croatia) VK Jadran Split
Rino Burić	5 April 1997 (aged 28)	DF	(Italy) Pro Recco
Loren Fatović	16 November 1996 (aged 29)	CF	(Croatia) VK Jadran Split
Luka Lončar	26 June 1987 (aged 38)	CF	(Croatia) HAVK Mladost
Franko Lazić	25 February 1998 (aged 27)	W	(Croatia) HAVK Mladost
Luka Bukić	30 April 1994 (aged 31)	W	(Croatia) HAVK Mladost
Ante Vukičević	24 February 1993 (aged 32)	W	(Croatia) HAVK Mladost
Marko Žuvela	22 December 2001 (aged 24)	DF	(Croatia) Jug AO Dubrovnik
Matias Biljaka	20 January 1999 (aged 26)	DF	(Croatia) HAVK Mladost
Josip Vrlić	25 April 1986 (aged 39)	CF	(Croatia) HAVK Mladost
Zvonimir Butić	2 November 1998 (aged 27)	W	(Croatia) VK Jadran Split
Konstantin Kharkov	23 February 1997 (aged 28)	W	(Croatia) HAVK Mladost
Ivan Marcelić	23 February 1997 (aged 28)	GK	(Croatia) HAVK Mladost
Filip Kržič	28 August 2000 (aged 25)	DF	(Croatia) Jug AO Dubrovnik
Andrija Basić	9 September 1995 (aged 30)	W	(Croatia) HAVK Mladost

=== Georgia ===
Head coach: (Greece) Athanasios Kechagias

Name	Date of birth	Pos.	Club
Irakli Razmadze	4 April 1997 (aged 28)	GK	(Georgia (country)) A-Polo Sport Management
Saba Tkeshelashvili	14 January 2004 (aged 21)	DF	(Georgia (country)) Dinamo Tbilisi
Valiko Dadvani	7 August 2002 (aged 23)	DF	(Serbia) Radnički Kragujevac
Nika Shushiashvili	18 April 1999 (aged 26)	W	(Hungary) BVSC Manna ABC
Andria Bitadze	17 May 1997 (aged 28)	W	(Georgia (country)) A-Polo Sport Management
Dušan Vasić	17 May 1997 (aged 28)	W	(Serbia) VK Novi Beograd
Sandro Adeishvili	6 September 1999 (aged 26)	CF	(Hungary) BVSC Manna ABC
Jovan Sarić	20 January 1991 (aged 34)	W	(Georgia (country)) A-Polo Sport Management
Revaz Imnaishvili (C)	9 August 1997 (aged 28)	W	(Georgia (country)) Dinamo Tbilisi
Giorgi Magrakvelidze	21 January 1998 (aged 27)	W	(Georgia (country)) Dinamo Tbilisi
Veljko Tankosić	7 November 1997 (aged 28)	W	(Italy) CC Ortigia
Stefan Pjesivac	12 December 1996 (aged 29)	CF	(Serbia) VK Novi Beograd
Giorgi Gvetadze	13 June 2002 (aged 23)	GK	(Georgia (country)) Dinamo Tbilisi
Andrija Vlahović	23 September 1991 (aged 34)	DF	(Croatia) VK Solaris
Luka Chikovani	9 July 2004 (aged 21)	W	(Romania) CS Dinamo București

=== Greece ===
The squad was announced on 8 January 2026.

Head coach: Thodoris Vlachos

Name	Date of birth	Pos.	Club
Emmanouil Zerdevas	12 August 1997 (aged 28)	GK	(Greece) Olympiacos Piraeus
Konstantinos Genidounias (C)	3 May 1998 (aged 27)	CF	(Greece) Olympiacos Piraeus
Dimitrios Skoumpakis	18 December 1998 (aged 27)	DF	(Greece) Panathinaikos AC
Konstantinos Gkiouvetsis	19 November 1999 (aged 26)	CF	(Greece) Panathinaikos AC
Stylianos Argyropoulos	2 August 1996 (aged 29)	CF	(Hungary) FTC-Telekom
Alexandros Papanastasiou	12 February 1999 (aged 26)	CF	(Greece) Olympiacos Piraeus
Nikolaos Gkillas	21 June 2003 (aged 22)	CF	(Greece) Olympiacos Piraeus
Efstathios Kalogeropoulos	28 June 2001 (aged 24)	CF	(France) CN Marseille
Aristeidis Chalyvopoulos	20 March 2002 (aged 23)	CF	(Greece) Panathinaikos AC
Konstantinos Kakaris	2 July 1999 (aged 26)	W	(Greece) Olympiacos Piraeus
Dimitrios Nikolaidis	10 June 1999 (aged 26)	W	(Greece) Olympiacos Piraeus
Nikolaos Papanikolaou	31 August 2000 (aged 25)	DF	(Greece) Panathinaikos AC
Panagiotis Tzortzatos	11 May 1992 (aged 33)	GK	(Greece) Olympiacos Piraeus
Evangelos Pouros	27 August 2003 (aged 22)	CF	(Greece) Olympiacos Piraeus
Semir Spachits	18 November 2005 (aged 20)	W	(Greece) NC Vouliagmeni

=== Slovenia ===
The squad was announced on 8 January 2026.

Head coach: (Montenegro) Mirko Vičević

Name	Date of birth	Pos.	Club
Jure Beton	23 April 1997 (aged 28)	GK	(Slovenia) VK Slovan Ljubljana
Vukasin Stefanović	11 October 2002 (aged 23)	W	(Germany) ASC Duisburg
Jaša Kadivec (C)	13 November 1993 (aged 32)	CF	(Slovenia) AVK Triglav Kranj
Matija Bernard Čanč	27 December 2004 (aged 21)	CF	(Slovenia) VK Slovan Ljubljana
Miha Šantak	7 April 2006 (aged 19)	DF	(Slovenia) AVK Branik Maribor
Marcel Lipnik	5 April 2008 (aged 17)	W	(Slovenia) VK Slovan Ljubljana
Nace Štromajer	3 December 2007 (aged 18)	W	(Spain) CN Sabadell
Aleksander Paunović	25 February 2004 (aged 21)	DF	(Slovenia) AVK Triglav Kranj
Fičur Gašper	30 January 2004 (aged 21)	CF	(Slovenia) VD Koper 1958
Aleksander Cerar	3 January 2004 (aged 22)	DF	(Slovenia) AVK Triglav Kranj
Aljaž Troppan	17 May 2002 (aged 23)	CF	(Slovenia) AVK Triglav Kranj
Enej Potocnik	1 August 2003 (aged 22)	DF	(Slovenia) VK Slovan Ljubljana
Milan Bulajić	4 May 2000 (aged 25)	DF	(Serbia) VK Zemun
Nikola Miletić	24 December 2005 (aged 20)	W	(Slovenia) AVK Branik Maribor
Bine Štromajer	7 January 2010 (aged 16)	W	(Spain) CN Sabadell

== Group C ==
=== Israel ===
Head coach: Tal Grodman

Name	Date of birth	Pos.	Club
Yahav Fire	14 July 1997 (aged 28)	GK	(Israel) Hapoel Palram Zvulun
Or Schlein	21 May 2002 (aged 23)	W	(Australia) Drummoyne
Ronen Gros	8 December 1991 (aged 34)	W	(Israel) Hapoel Palram Zvulun
Gil Natan Gvishi	28 July 2003 (aged 22)	W	(Italy) Chiavari Nuoto
Tomer Arazi	13 November 2006 (aged 19)	CF	(Israel) Givat Haim
Amir Shafrir	2 February 2006 (aged 19)	DF	(Israel) Hapoel Palram Zvulun
Vlad Begin	6 May 1998 (aged 27)	DF	(Israel) Gush Zvulun
Ido Goldschmidt (C)	28 December 1993 (aged 32)	W	(Israel) Hapoel Palram Zvulun
Itai Roth	11 April 2001 (aged 24)	W	(United States) Long Beach State University
Yoav Rendler	5 February 2002 (aged 23)	W	(United States) University Of The Pacific
Ori Buzaglo	4 February 2003 (aged 22)	CF	(United States) University Of The Pacific
Yuval Klarfeld	12 September 1999 (aged 26)	W	(Israel) Hapoel Palram Zvulun
Maxim Smirnov	23 March 2003 (aged 22)	GK	(United States) Pepperdine University
Nadav Carnon	5 July 2003 (aged 22)	DF	(United States) Wagner College
Raz Segere Sharir	17 April 2006 (aged 19)	W	(Israel) Hapoel Givat Haim

=== Netherlands ===
The squad was announced on 6 January 2026.

Head coach: (Serbia) Branko Mitrović

Name	Date of birth	Pos.	Club
Miki Buitenhuis	16 September 2002 (aged 23)	GK	(Netherlands) UZSC
Bilal Gbadamassi (C)	23 September 1997 (aged 28)	CF	(France) CN Marseille
Jeroen Rouwenhorst	10 January 2000 (aged 25)	CF	(Italy) RN Florentia
Benjamin Hessels	13 December 2001 (aged 24)	DF	(Hungary) OSC Budapest
Mart van der Weijden	20 October 2003 (aged 22)	W	(Spain) CN Barcelona
Tim de Mey	18 December 1997 (aged 28)	W	(Italy) RN Florentia
Kas Te Riele	21 August 2002 (aged 23)	W	(Greece) NC Vouliagmeni
Sebastian Hessels	13 December 2001 (aged 24)	W	(Hungary) OSC Budapest
Sam van der Berg	25 October 1997 (aged 28)	DF	(Germany) Waspo'98 Hannover
Tom de Weerd	16 April 1998 (aged 27)	W	(Spain) Tenerife Echeyde
Marnick Snel	2 October 2004 (aged 21)	DF	(Croatia) VK Primorje
Lars ten Broek	23 February 2004 (aged 21)	W	(Spain) CN San Andreu
Jelto Spijker	29 August 1999 (aged 26)	GK	(Germany) Spandau 04
Niels Hofmeijer	19 June 2000 (aged 25)	DF	(Italy) RN Florentia
Jorrit van der Weijen	13 November 2006 (aged 19)	W	(Netherlands) GZC Donk

=== Serbia ===
The squad was announced on 5 January 2026.

Head coach: Uroš Stevanović

Name	Date of birth	Pos.	Club
Radoslav Filipović	19 August 1997 (aged 28)	GK	(Serbia) Radnički Kragujevac
Dušan Mandić	16 June 1994 (aged 31)	W	(Hungary) FTC-Telekom
Strahinja Rašović	9 March 1992 (aged 33)	W	(Serbia) Radnički Kragujevac
Sava Ranđelović	17 July 1993 (aged 32)	DF	(Serbia) Radnički Kragujevac
Miloš Ćuk	21 December 1990 (aged 35)	W	(Serbia) VK Novi Beograd
Đorđe Lazić	19 May 1996 (aged 29)	CF	(Montenegro) Jadran m:tel Herceg Novi
Radomir Drašović	22 July 1997 (aged 28)	W	(France) CN Marseille
Nikola Jakšić (C)	17 January 1997 (aged 28)	W	(Serbia) Radnički Kragujevac
Nemanja Vico	19 November 1994 (aged 31)	CF	(Montenegro) VK Primorac Kotor
Nikola Dedović	25 January 1992 (aged 33)	W	(Serbia) Radnički Kragujevac
Petar Jakšić	20 July 2001 (aged 24)	DF	(Serbia) Radnički Kragujevac
Viktor Rašović	13 August 1993 (aged 32)	DF	(Serbia) Radnički Kragujevac
Milan Glušac	30 September 2002 (aged 23)	GK	(Serbia) VK Novi Beograd
Vasilije Martinović	13 January 2003 (aged 22)	W	(Serbia) VK Novi Beograd
Nikola Lukić	14 April 1998 (aged 27)	W	(Serbia) VK Novi Beograd

=== Spain ===
The squad was announced on 7 January 2026.

Head coach: David Martín

Name	Date of birth	Pos.	Club
Unai Aguirre	14 July 2002 (aged 23)	GK	(Spain) CN Atlètic-Barceloneta
Alberto Munárriz (C)	19 May 1994 (aged 31)	DF	(Spain) CN Atlètic-Barceloneta
Álvaro Granados	8 October 1998 (aged 27)	W	(Italy) Pro Recco
Bernat Sanahuja	21 October 2000 (aged 25)	DF	(Spain) CN Atlètic-Barceloneta
Miguel de Toro	16 August 1993 (aged 32)	CF	(Hungary) FTC-Telekom
Marc Larumbe	30 May 1994 (aged 31)	W	(France) CN Marseille
Pol Daura	3 October 2002 (aged 23)	DF	(Spain) CN Barcelona
Sergi Cabañas	10 February 1996 (aged 29)	W	(Spain) CN Sabadell
Roger Tahull	11 May 1997 (aged 28)	CF	(Spain) CN Atlètic-Barceloneta
Fran Valera	21 March 1999 (aged 26)	W	(Montenegro) Jadran m:tel Herceg Novi
Unai Biel	19 November 2002 (aged 23)	W	(Spain) CN Atlètic-Barceloneta
Alejandro Bustos	17 March 1997 (aged 28)	DF	(Spain) CN Atlètic-Barceloneta
Eduardo Lorrio	25 September 1993 (aged 32)	GK	(Spain) CN Sabadell
Oscar Asensio	2 February 2001 (aged 24)	CF	(Spain) CN Sabadell
Biel Gomila	24 February 2006 (aged 19)	DF	(Spain) CN Atlètic-Barceloneta

== Group D ==
=== Italy ===
Head coach: Sandro Campagna

Name	Date of birth	Pos.	Club
Marco Del Lungo (C)	1 March 1990 (aged 35)	GK	(Italy) RN Savona
Francesco Cassia	29 March 2002 (aged 23)	W	(Italy) Pro Recco
Jacopo Alesiani	18 June 1996 (aged 29)	W	(Italy) AN Brescia
Mario Del Basso	14 November 1998 (aged 27)	CF	(Italy) AN Brescia
Filippo Ferrero	31 July 2002 (aged 23)	W	(Italy) AN Brescia
Edoardo Di Somma	30 August 1996 (aged 29)	DF	(Hungary) FTC-Telekom
Vincenzo Dolce	11 May 1995 (aged 30)	CF	(Italy) AN Brescia
Tommaso Gianazza	21 July 2002 (aged 23)	CF	(Italy) AN Brescia
Matteo Iocchi Gratta	1 September 2002 (aged 23)	CF	(Italy) Pro Recco
Lorenzo Bruni	8 April 1994 (aged 31)	CF	(Italy) RN Savona
Francesco Condemi	23 December 2003 (aged 22)	W	(Italy) Pro Recco
Alessandro Carnesecchi	18 January 2002 (aged 23)	W	(Italy) CC Ortigia
Francesco De Michelis	3 September 1999 (aged 26)	GK	(Italy) Training Academy Olympic Roma
Alessandro Balzarini	28 November 2003 (aged 22)	CF	(Italy) AN Brescia
Mattia Antonucci	2 November 2000 (aged 25)	DF	(Italy) Roma Vis Nova

=== Romania ===
Head coach: Bogdan Rath

Name	Date of birth	Pos.	Club
Marius Florin Tic (C)	9 September 1996 (aged 29)	GK	(Romania) CSA Steaua București
Francesco Iudean	28 September 2001 (aged 24)	DF	(Romania) CSA Steaua București
Matei Ioan Lutescu	5 June 2002 (aged 23)	DF	(Romania) CS Dinamo București
Tudor-Andrei Fulea	13 March 1997 (aged 28)	W	(Romania) CSA Steaua București
Andrei-Radu Neamtu	6 April 2004 (aged 21)	W	(Romania) CSA Steaua București
Andrei Prioteasa	3 April 1996 (aged 29)	W	(Romania) CS Dinamo București
Andrei Tepelus	9 February 2005 (aged 20)	W	(Romania) CSA Steaua București
Nicolae Oanță	14 August 1990 (aged 35)	DF	(Romania) CSA Steaua București
Alexandru Gheorghe	24 August 2002 (aged 23)	CF	(United States) Stanford
Vlad-Luca Georgescu	31 March 1999 (aged 26)	W	(Romania) CSA Steaua București
David Belenyesi	21 April 2003 (aged 22)	W	(Romania) CSM Oradea
Levente Vancsik	12 July 1994 (aged 31)	CF	(Romania) CSM Oradea
Mihai Drăgușin	5 January 1984 (aged 42)	GK	(Romania) CSA Steaua București
David-Joan Bota	2 June 1999 (aged 26)	CF	(Romania) CSA Steaua București
Luncan Darian	20 September 2002 (aged 23)	DF	(Romania) CSM Oradea

=== Slovakia ===
The squad was announced on 6 January 2026.

Head coach: Roman Polačik

Name	Date of birth	Pos.	Club
Lukáš Kozmér	6 December 1993 (aged 32)	GK	(France) Olympic Nice Natation
Marek Tkáč	9 March 1995 (aged 30)	GK	(Germany) Spandau 04
Maroš Tkáč	13 July 1996 (aged 29)	W	(Italy) Muri Antichi
Lukáš Seman	6 October 1987 (aged 38)	CF	(Croatia) VK Primorje
Lukáš Ďurík	2 December 1992 (aged 33)	CF	(Italy) Pro Recco
Matej Čaraj	20 September 2000 (aged 25)	CF	(Germany) Spandau 04
Marco Mihal	4 February 2002 (aged 23)	DF	(Hungary) One Eger
Patrik Tisaj	12 October 2002 (aged 23)	DF	(France) Olympic Nice Natation
Marek Molnar	31 October 1991 (aged 34)	DF	(Germany) White Sharks Hannover
Boris Juhasz	19 October 2001 (aged 24)	CF	(Slovakia) ŠK Hornets Košice
Tomas Bielik	19 November 1993 (aged 32)	DF	(Slovakia) KVP Nováky
Samuel Baláž (C)	5 January 1994 (aged 32)	W	(France) Olympic Nice Natation
Filip Balogh	4 July 2005 (aged 20)	GK	(Slovakia) CH Košice
Adam Furman	16 May 1999 (aged 26)	W	(France) Team Strasbourg

=== Turkey ===
Head coach: (Greece) Konstantinos Loudis

Name	Date of birth	Pos.	Club
Hüseyin Kağan Kil	23 July 1999 (aged 26)	GK	(Turkey) Enka Istanbul
Arda Yener	26 June 2006 (aged 19)	DF	(Turkey) Enka Istanbul
Kaan Oğuzcan	19 September 2001 (aged 24)	CF	(Greece) Athletic Club Of Palaio Faliro
Fatih Acar	22 November 1998 (aged 27)	W	(Turkey) Galatasaray
Tugay Ergin (C)	3 January 1993 (aged 33)	DF	(Turkey) Enka Istanbul
Berk Alkan	22 April 1998 (aged 27)	CF	(Turkey) Enka Istanbul
Kerem Gemalmazoğlu	21 May 2001 (aged 24)	CF	(Germany) ASC Duisburg
Alpman Orhan Arda	25 June 2006 (aged 19)	DF	(Turkey) Galatasaray
Efe Naipoglu	5 June 2006 (aged 19)	W	(Turkey) Galatasaray
Yutmaz Mehmet	7 July 2002 (aged 23)	W	(France) Pays d'Aix Natation
Ege Kahraman	8 March 1999 (aged 26)	W	(Turkey) Enka Istanbul
Yuşa Han Düzenli	15 September 2001 (aged 24)	W	(Turkey) Enka Istanbul
Mert Meral	5 February 2003 (aged 22)	GK	(Turkey) Enka Istanbul
Ege Kahraman	29 January 2005 (aged 20)	W	(Turkey) Galatasaray
Efe Kuloğlu	3 December 2001 (aged 24)	W	(Turkey) Galatasaray

=== Notable players ===
Oldest player	Age
(Romania) Mihai Drăgușin	5 January 1984 (aged 42)
Youngest player	Age
(Slovenia) Bine Štromajer	7 January 2010 (aged 16)
