= Beka Kavtaradze =

Beka Kavtaradze may refer to:

- Beka Kavtaradze (footballer) (born 1999), Georgian football player
- Beka Kavtaradze (water polo) (born 1990), Georgian water polo player
