= Georgia at the 2017 World Aquatics Championships =

- Flag of Georgia (country)
- World Aquatics code: GEO
- National federation: Georgian Swimming Federation

in Budapest, Hungary
- Competitors: 6 in 2 sports
- Medals: Gold 0 Silver 0 Bronze 0 Total 0

World Aquatics Championships appearances
- 1994; 1998; 2001; 2003; 2005; 2007; 2009; 2011; 2013; 2015; 2017; 2019; 2022; 2023; 2024; 2025

Other related appearances
- Soviet Union (1973–1991)

Georgia is scheduled to compete at the 2017 World Aquatics Championships in Budapest, Hungary from 14 to 30 July 2017.

== Diving ==
Georgia entered two divers (both male).

Athlete	Event	Preliminaries		Semifinals		Final	
Athlete	Event	Points	Rank	Points	Rank	Points	Rank
Sandro Melikidze	Men's 3 m springboard	281.00	52	did not advance			
Sandro Melikidze; Tornike Onikashvili	Men's 3 m synchronized springboard	316.14	19	—N/a		did not advance	

== Swimming ==
Georgia has received a Universality invitation from FINA to send a maximum of four swimmers (two men and two women) to the World Championships.

Athlete	Event	Heat		Semifinal		Final	
Athlete	Event	Time	Rank	Time	Rank	Time	Rank
Giorgi Biganishvili	Men's 50 m freestyle	23.72 NR	70	did not advance			
Giorgi Biganishvili	Men's 100 m freestyle	52.09	=66	did not advance			
Irakli Revishvili	Men's 200 m freestyle	1:56.51	64	did not advance			
Irakli Revishvili	Men's 400 m freestyle	4:04.64	46	—N/a		did not advance	
Rusudan Goginashvili	Women's 50 m backstroke	31.97	55	did not advance			
Rusudan Goginashvili	Women's 200 m breaststroke	2:45.52	32	did not advance			
Meri Mumladze	Women's 50 m breaststroke	34.91	38	did not advance			
Meri Mumladze	Women's 100 m breaststroke	1:16.70	42	did not advance			
