= Georgia at the 2015 World Aquatics Championships =

- Flag of Georgia (country)
- World Aquatics code: GEO
- National federation: Georgian Swimming Federation

in Kazan, Russia
- Competitors: 6 in 2 sports
- Medals: Gold 0 Silver 0 Bronze 0 Total 0

World Aquatics Championships appearances
- 1994; 1998; 2001; 2003; 2005; 2007; 2009; 2011; 2013; 2015; 2017; 2019; 2022; 2023; 2024; 2025

Other related appearances
- Soviet Union (1973–1991)

Georgia competed at the 2015 World Aquatics Championships in Kazan, Russia from 24 July to 9 August 2015.

== Diving ==
Georgian divers qualified for the individual spots at the World Championships.

Men

Athlete	Event	Preliminaries		Semifinals		Final	
Athlete	Event	Points	Rank	Points	Rank	Points	Rank
Chola Chanturia	3 m springboard	371.30	33	Did not advance			
Aleksandre Gujabidze	3 m springboard	249.80	59	Did not advance			

== Swimming ==
Georgian swimmers have achieved qualifying standards in the following events (up to a maximum of 2 swimmers in each event at the A-standard entry time, and 1 at the B-standard):

Men

Athlete	Event	Heat		Semifinal		Final	
Athlete	Event	Time	Rank	Time	Rank	Time	Rank
Irakli Bolkvadze	200 m breaststroke	2:17.30	42	Did not advance			
Irakli Bolkvadze	200 m individual medley	2:07.14	39	Did not advance			
Teimuraz Kobakhidze	100 m butterfly	55.37	51	Did not advance			
Teimuraz Kobakhidze	200 m butterfly	2:06.19	37	Did not advance			
Irakli Revishvili	200 m freestyle	1:53.68	61	Did not advance			
Irakli Revishvili	400 m freestyle	4:00.68	54	—N/a		Did not advance	

Women

Athlete	Event	Heat		Semifinal		Final	
Athlete	Event	Time	Rank	Time	Rank	Time	Rank
Teona Bostashvili	50 m freestyle	DNS		Did not advance			
Teona Bostashvili	100 m freestyle	DNS		Did not advance			
Teona Bostashvili	100 m breaststroke	1:19.53	60	Did not advance			
