= Georgia at the 2013 World Aquatics Championships =

- Flag of Georgia (country)
- World Aquatics code: GEO
- National federation: Georgian Swimming Federation

in Barcelona, Spain
- Competitors: 4 in 2 sports
- Medals: Gold 0 Silver 0 Bronze 0 Total 0

World Aquatics Championships appearances
- 1994; 1998; 2001; 2003; 2005; 2007; 2009; 2011; 2013; 2015; 2017; 2019; 2022; 2023; 2024; 2025

Other related appearances
- Soviet Union (1973–1991)

Georgia is competing at the 2013 World Aquatics Championships in Barcelona, Spain between 19 July and 4 August 2013.

== Diving ==
Georgia has qualified one diver.

Men

Athlete	Event	Preliminaries		Semifinals		Final	
Athlete	Event	Points	Rank	Points	Rank	Points	Rank
Chola Chanturia	3 m springboard	317.50	40	did not advance			

== Swimming ==
Georgian swimmers achieved qualifying standards in the following events (up to a maximum of 2 swimmers in each event at the A-standard entry time, and 1 at the B-standard):

Men

Athlete	Event	Heat		Semifinal		Final	
Athlete	Event	Time	Rank	Time	Rank	Time	Rank
Irakli Bolkvadze	200 m breaststroke	2:18.23	37	did not advance			
Irakli Bolkvadze	200 m individual medley	2:03.55	35	did not advance			
Davit Sikharulidze	50 m freestyle	24.49	61	did not advance			
Davit Sikharulidze	100 m freestyle	51.81	46	did not advance			

Women

Athlete	Event	Heat		Semifinal		Final	
Athlete	Event	Time	Rank	Time	Rank	Time	Rank
Teona Bostashvili	50 m breaststroke	37.04	64	did not advance			
