= Georgia at the 2019 World Aquatics Championships =

- Flag of Georgia (country)
- World Aquatics code: GEO
- National federation: Georgian Swimming Federation

in Gwangju, South Korea
- Medals: Gold 0 Silver 0 Bronze 0 Total 0

World Aquatics Championships appearances
- 1994; 1998; 2001; 2003; 2005; 2007; 2009; 2011; 2013; 2015; 2017; 2019; 2022; 2023; 2024; 2025

Other related appearances
- Soviet Union (1973–1991)

Georgia competed at the 2019 World Aquatics Championships in Gwangju, South Korea from 12 to 28 July.

== Diving ==
Georgia's diving team consisted of 2 athletes (2 male).

Men

Athlete	Event	Preliminaries		Semifinals		Final	
Athlete	Event	Points	Rank	Points	Rank	Points	Rank
Sandro Melikidze	3 m springboard	269.00	53	did not advance			
Sandro Melikidze; Tornike Onikashvili	Synchronized 3 m springboard	292.71	23	—N/a		did not advance	

== Swimming ==
Georgia entered four swimmers.

Men

Athlete	Event	Heat		Semifinal		Final	
Athlete	Event	Time	Rank	Time	Rank	Time	Rank
Teimuraz Kobakhidze	100 m freestyle	51.93	72	did not advance			
Teimuraz Kobakhidze	100 m butterfly	56.03	53	did not advance			
Irakli Revishvili	200 m freestyle	1:54.00	55	did not advance			
Irakli Revishvili	400 m freestyle	4:00.88	41	—N/a		did not advance	

Women

Athlete	Event	Heat		Semifinal		Final	
Athlete	Event	Time	Rank	Time	Rank	Time	Rank
Mariam Imnadze	50 m freestyle	27.95	61	did not advance			
Mariam Imnadze	100 m freestyle	59.97	63	did not advance			
Tinatin Kevlishvili	200 m freestyle	2:17.71	55	did not advance			
Tinatin Kevlishvili	400 m freestyle	4:49.73	43	—N/a		did not advance	
