= Beka Kavtaradze (water polo) =

Georgian water polo player

Personal information
- Nationality: Georgian
- Born: 9 July 1990 (age 36)
- Height: 1.91 m (6 ft 3 in)
- Weight: 102 kg (225 lb)

Sport
- Sport: Water polo
- Handedness: Right
- Position: Defender
- Current club: VK Locomotive Tbilisi

Senior clubs
- Years: Team
- Dinamo Tbilisi
National team
- Years: Team
- (Georgia (country)) Georgia

Beka Kavtaradze (born 9 July 1990) is a Georgian water polo player for VK Dinamo Tbilisi and the Georgian national team.

He participated at the 2014 2016 2018 2020Men's European Water Polo Championship.
