= Georgia at the 2024 World Aquatics Championships =

- Flag of Georgia
- FINA code: GEO
- National federation: Georgian Aquatic Sports National Federation

in Doha, Qatar
- Competitors: 13 in 4 sports
- Medals: Gold 0 Silver 0 Bronze 0 Total 0

World Aquatics Championships appearances
- 1994; 1998; 2001; 2003; 2005; 2007; 2009; 2011; 2013; 2015; 2017; 2019; 2022; 2023; 2024

Other related appearances
- Soviet Union (1973–1991)

Georgia competed at the 2024 World Aquatics Championships in Doha, Qatar from 2 to 18 February.

== Competitors ==
The following is the list of competitors in the Championships.

Sport	Men	Women	Total
Artistic swimming	0	4	4
Diving	3	2	5
Open water swimming	1	0	1
Swimming	2	1	3
Total	6	7	13

== Artistic swimming ==
Women

Athlete	Event	Preliminaries		Final	
Athlete	Event	Points	Rank	Points	Rank
Mari Alavidze	Solo technical routine	233.5017	7 Q	216.7634	8
Mari Alavidze	Solo free routine	219.2188	6 Q	185.7250	12
Ani Kipiani; Nita Natobadze	Duet technical routine	176.8650	33	Did not advance	
Mari Alavidze; Tekla Gogilidze	Duet free routine	141.7354	29	Did not advance	

== Diving ==
Men

Athlete	Event	Preliminaries		Semifinals		Final	
Athlete	Event	Points	Rank	Points	Rank	Points	Rank
Tornike Onikashvili	3 m springboard	274.75	54	Did not advance			
Irakli Sakandelidze	1 m springboard	223.35	36	—		Did not advance	

Women

Athlete	Event	Preliminaries		Semifinals		Final	
Athlete	Event	Points	Rank	Points	Rank	Points	Rank
Mariam Shanidze	1 m springboard	127.80	46	—		Did not advance	
Tekle Sharia	1 m springboard	148.30	43	—		Did not advance	
Mariam Shanidze; Tekle Sharia	3 m synchro springboard	—				176.97	17

Mixed

Athlete	Event	Final	
Athlete	Event	Points	Rank
Giorgi Tsulukidze; Tekle Sharia	3 m synchro springboard	198.72	16

== Open water swimming ==
Men

Athlete	Event	Time	Rank
Davit Sikharulidze	Men's 5 km	1:04:52.1	72

== Swimming ==
Georgia entered 3 swimmers.

Men

Athlete	Event	Heat		Semifinal		Final	
Athlete	Event	Time	Rank	Time	Rank	Time	Rank
Luka Kukhalashvili	100 metre freestyle	54.41	81	Did not advance			
Luka Kukhalashvili	200 metre freestyle	1:58.79	62	Did not advance			
Nika Tchitchiashvili	100 metre butterfly	54.71	40	Did not advance			
Nika Tchitchiashvili	200 metre butterfly	2:03.41	32	Did not advance			

Women

Athlete	Event	Heat		Semifinal		Final	
Athlete	Event	Time	Rank	Time	Rank	Time	Rank
Ana Nizharadze	100 metre butterfly	1:03.28	32	Did not advance			
Ana Nizharadze	200 metre butterfly	2:22.35	22	Did not advance			
