= Uroš Stevanović =

Serbian water polo coach

Personal information
- Born: 8 October 1982 (age 44) Belgrade, SFR Yugoslavia

Sport
- Sport: Water polo

Teams coached
- Years: Team
- 2009–2013: Partizan (assistant)
- 2012: Partizan
- 2013–present: Radnički Kragujevac
- 2014–2022: Serbia (assistant)
- 2022–2026: Serbia
Medal record
Representing Serbia as Head Coach
Olympic Games
Gold medal – first place	2024 Paris	Coach
European Championships
Gold medal – first place	2026 Belgrade	Coach

Uroš Stevanović (born 8 October 1982) is a Serbian professional water polo coach who is the head coach of Radnički Kragujevac.

== Coaching career ==
In October 2022, after eight years of working as an assistant coach of the Serbia men's national water polo team, Stevanović became the head coach of the national team. He won a gold medal at the 2024 Summer Olympics, as well as the 2026 European Championship. He resigned in May 2026.
