= Nikola Lukić (water polo) =

Serbian water polo player (born 1998)

Personal information
- Nationality: Serbian
- Born: 14 April 1998 (age 28) Belgrade, Serbia, FR Yugoslavia
- Height: 187 cm (6 ft 2 in)

Sport
- Sport: Water polo
- Current club: VK Novi Beograd

Senior clubs
- Years: Team
- 2015–2018: VK Partizan
- 2018–2019: VK Šabac
- 2019–2023: VK Radnički
- 2023–present: VK Novi Beograd
Medal record
Men's water polo
Representing Serbia
European Championships
Gold medal – first place	2026 Belgrade	Team
European Games
Gold medal – first place	2015 Baku	Team
Mediterranean Games
Bronze medal – third place	2026 Taranto	Team

Nikola Lukić (Serbian: Никола Лукић; born 14 April 1998) is a Serbian water polo player who plays for VK Novi Beograd.

He represents the Serbian national water polo team and won a gold medal at the 2026 Men's European Water Polo Championship held in Belgrade, Serbia.

== Honours ==
=== Club ===
==== Partizan ====
- Serbian Cup: 2016, 2017, 2018
- Serbian League: 2015-16, 2016-17, 2017-18

==== Šabac ====
- Serbian Cup: 2019
- Serbian League: 2019

==== Radnički ====
- Serbian Cup: 2020, 2022
- Serbian League: 2021
- Regional A1 League: 2021
- Regional A2 League: 2020

==== Novi Beograd ====
- Serbian Cup: 2024, 2025, 2026
- Serbian League: 2024
- Regional A1 League: 2024
- Champions League: runner-up 2025
