= Georgia at the 2023 World Aquatics Championships =

- Flag of Georgia
- FINA code: GEO
- National federation: Georgian Aquatic Sports National Federation

in Fukuoka, Japan
- Competitors: 6 in 3 sports
- Medals: Gold 0 Silver 0 Bronze 0 Total 0

World Aquatics Championships appearances
- 1994; 1998; 2001; 2003; 2005; 2007; 2009; 2011; 2013; 2015; 2017; 2019; 2022; 2023; 2024

Other related appearances
- Soviet Union (1973–1991)

Georgia competed at the 2023 World Aquatics Championships in Fukuoka, Japan from 14 to 30 July.

== Artistic swimming ==
Georgia entered 1 artistic swimmer.

Women

Athlete	Event	Preliminaries		Final	
Athlete	Event	Points	Rank	Points	Rank
Mari Alavidze	Solo technical routine	162.0168	24	Did not advance	
Mari Alavidze	Solo free routine	148.3376	13	Did not advance	

== Diving ==
Georgia entered 3 divers.

Men

Athlete	Event	Preliminaries		Semifinal		Final	
Athlete	Event	Points	Rank	Points	Rank	Points	Rank
Sandro Melikidze	3 m springboard	327.80	42	Did not advance			
Tornike Onikashvili	1 m springboard	275.35	47	—		Did not advance	
Irakli Sakandelidze	1 m springboard	263.10	48	—		Did not advance	
Sandro Melikidze; Tornike Onikashvili	3 m synchronized springboard	251.34	25	—		Did not advance	

== Swimming ==
Georgia entered 2 swimmers.

Men

Athlete	Event	Heat		Semifinal		Final	
Athlete	Event	Time	Rank	Time	Rank	Time	Rank
Luka Eradze	50 metre breaststroke	29.06	43	Did not advance			
Luka Eradze	100 metre breaststroke	1:04.91	56	Did not advance			
Noe Pantskhava	50 metre backstroke	26.63	44	Did not advance			
Noe Pantskhava	100 metre backstroke	57.10	44	Did not advance			
