= Xiong Dunhan =

Chinese water polo player (born 1998)

Personal information
- Born: 11 November 1998 (age 27) Yueyang, Hunan, China
- Height: 181 cm (5 ft 11 in)
- Weight: 77 kg (170 lb)

Sport
- Sport: water polo
Medal record
Representing China
World University Games
Gold medal – first place	2021 Chengdu	Team
Asian Games
Gold medal – first place	2018 Jakarta	Team
Gold medal – first place	2022 Hangzhou	Team
- Updated on 11 August 2023

Xiong Dunhan (熊敦瀚; born 11 November 1998) is a Chinese water polo player.

She was part of the Chinese team at the 2015 World Aquatics Championships, and the 2016 Summer Olympics.

== See also ==
- China at the 2015 World Aquatics Championships
