= Lu Yiwen (water polo) =

Chinese water polo player (born 1996)

Personal information
- Nationality: Chinese
- Born: 16 May 1996 (age 30) Zibo, China
- Height: 1.81 m (5 ft 11 in)

Sport
- Sport: Water polo
Medal record
World University Games
Gold medal – first place	2021 Chengdu	Team
Asian Games
Gold medal – first place	2014 Incheon	Team
Gold medal – first place	2022 Hangzhou	Team

Lu Yiwen (born 16 May 1996) is a Chinese water polo player. She competed in the 2020 Summer Olympics.
