= Wang Huan (water polo) =

Chinese water polo player (born 1997)

Personal information
- Nationality: China
- Born: 18 October 1997 (age 28) Nanchong, China
- Height: 1.84 m (6 ft 0 in)

Sport
- Sport: Water polo
Medal record
World University Games
Gold medal – first place	2021 Chengdu	Team
Asian Games
Gold medal – first place	2018 Jakarta	Team
Gold medal – first place	2022 Hangzhou	Team

Wang Huan (born 8 October 1997) is a Chinese water polo player. She competed in the 2020 Summer Olympics.
