= Chen Xiao (water polo) =

Chinese water polo player (born 1999)

Personal information
- Nationality: China
- Born: 11 March 1999 (age 27)
- Height: 1.81 m (5 ft 11 in)

Sport
- Sport: Water polo
Medal record
World University Games
Gold medal – first place	2021 Chengdu	Team
Asian Games
Gold medal – first place	2018 Jakarta	Team
Gold medal – first place	2022 Hangzhou	Team

Chen Xiao (born 11 March 1999) is a Chinese water polo player. She competed in the 2020 Summer Olympics.
