= Zhai Ying =

Chinese water polo player (born 1996)

Personal information
- Nationality: China
- Born: 10 February 1996 (age 30) Yongzhou, China
- Height: 1.72 m (5 ft 8 in)

Sport
- Sport: Water polo
Medal record
World University Games
Gold medal – first place	2021 Chengdu	Team
Asian Games
Gold medal – first place	2018 Jakarta	Team
Gold medal – first place	2022 Hangzhou	Team

Zhai Ying (born 10 February 1996) is a Chinese water polo player. She competed in the 2020 Summer Olympics.
