= Giorgi Meskhi =

Georgian water polo player

Personal information
- Nationality: Georgian
- Born: 25 April 1998 (age 28)
- Height: 1.88 m (6 ft 2 in)
- Weight: 84 kg (185 lb)

Sport
- Sport: Water polo
- Handedness: Right
- Position: Field player
- Current club: Ethnikos OFPF

Senior clubs
- Years: Team
- Ethnikos OFPF
National team
- Years: Team
- (Georgia (country)) Georgia
Medal record
World University Games
Bronze medal – third place	2021 Chengdu	Team

Giorgi Meskhi (born 25 April 1998) is a Georgian water polo player for Ethnikos Piraeus and the Georgian national team.

He participated at the 2018 Men's European Water Polo Championship.

For the 2023–24 season, he plays for Greek club Ethnikos Piraeus.
