= Zhang Jing (water polo) =

Chinese water polo player (born 1996)

Personal information
- Born: 16 June 1996 (age 30) Longyan, Fujian, China
- Height: 166 cm (5 ft 5 in)
- Weight: 63 kg (139 lb)

Sport
- Sport: water polo
Medal record
World University Games
| Gold medal – first place | 2021 Chengdu | Team |
Asian Games
| Gold medal – first place | 2018 Jakarta | Team |
| Gold medal – first place | 2022 Hangzhou | Team |
- Updated on 11 August 2023

Zhang Jing (张婧; born 16 June 1996) is a Chinese water polo player.

She was part of the Chinese team at the 2015 World Aquatics Championships, 2016 Summer Olympics and the 2020 Summer Olympics.

== See also ==
- China at the 2015 World Aquatics Championships
