= Khvicha Jakhaia =

Georgian water polo player (born 1996)

Personal information
- Nationality: Georgian
- Born: 16 September 1996 (age 30)
- Height: 1.95 m (6 ft 5 in)
- Weight: 103 kg (227 lb)

Sport
- Sport: Water polo
- Handedness: Right
- Position: Defender
- Current club: Dinamo Moscow

Senior clubs
- Years: Team
- Dinamo Tbilisi
National team
- Years: Team
- Georgia
Medal record
World University Games
Bronze medal – third place	2021 Chengdu	Team

Khvicha Jakhaia (born 16 September 1996) is a Georgian water polo player for Dinamo Moscow and the Georgian national team.

He participated at the 2018 Men's European Water Polo Championship.
