= Revaz Imnaishvili =

Georgian National water polo team Captain

Personal information
- Nationality: Georgian
- Born: 9 August 1997 (age 29) Tbilisi, Georgia
- Height: 1.86 m (6 ft 1 in)
- Weight: 96 kg (212 lb)

Sport
- Sport: Water polo
- Handedness: Right
- Position: Field player
- Current club: Dinamo Tbilisi
- Number: 4

Senior clubs
- Years: Team
- Szeged, KVP Novaky, Rari Nantes Sori, WPC Dinamo Tbilisi
National team
- Years: Team
- 2015 - Present: (Georgia (country)) Georgia
Medal record
World University Games
Bronze medal – third place	2021 Chengdu	Team

Revaz Imnaishvili (born 9 August 1997) is a Georgian water polo player for WPC Dinamo Tbilisi and the captain of Georgian national water polo team.

Previously he has played for water polo teams of Szeged (Hungary), KVP Novaky (Slovakia), and Rari Nantes Sori (Italy).

He participated at the 2016 - 2018 - 2020 Men's European Water Polo Championships.
