= Georgia men's national water polo team =

Georgia
- FINA code: GEO
- Association: Georgian Aquatic Sports Federation
- Confederation: LEN (Europe)
- Head coach: Athanasios Kechagias
- Asst coach: Arsenis Maroulis; Konstantine Nadiradze
- Captain: Revaz Imnaishvili

FINA ranking (since 2008)
- Current: 13 (as of 9 August 2021)

World Championship
- Appearances: 1 (first in 2022)
- Best result: 10th (2022)

World Cup
- Appearances: 1 (first in 2026)
- Best result: 8th (2026)

European Championship
- Appearances: 7 (first in 2014)
- Best result: 8th (2022)

The Georgia men's national water polo team represents Georgia in international men's water polo competitions. The team participated at the 2014 European Championship.

== Results ==
=== World Championships ===
Year	Round	Position	Pld	W	D	L	GF	GA	GD
1973–1991	part of USSR								
1994–2019	did not qualify								
(Hungary) 2022	Playoffs for QF	10th	6	2	0	4	79	74	+5
2023–2025	did not qualify								
Total	Qualified: 1/19		6	2	0	4	79	74	+5

=== World Cup ===
Year	Round	Position	Pld	W	D	L	GF	GA	GD
2026	Preliminary round	8th	3	0	0	3	39	54	−15
Total	1/10		3	0	0	3	39	54	−15

=== World League ===
– Host of the Super Final

Year	Round	Position	Pld	W	D	L	GF	GA	GD
2002–2015	did not compete								
2016	European Preliminary round		6	0	0	6	57	100	−43
2017	European Preliminary round		4	0	0	4	38	60	−22
2018	did not compete								
2019	did not compete								
2020	Quarterfinals	8th	8	1	0	7	68	123	−55
2022	did not compete								
Total	Participated: 3/20 Qualified for the Super Final: 1/3		18	1	0	17	163	283	−120

=== European Championships ===
Year	Round	Position	Pld	W	D	L	GF	GA	GD
1926–1991	part of USSR								
1993–2012	did not qualify								
(Hungary) 2014	Group stage	12th	7	0	0	7	45	93	−48
(Serbia) 2016	Group stage	14th	7	1	0	6	55	95	−40
(Spain) 2018	Group stage	13th	5	2	0	3	40	52	−12
(Hungary) 2020	Playoffs for QF	10th	6	2	0	4	58	71	−13
(Croatia) 2022	Quarterfinals	8th	7	2	0	5	68	87	−19
(Croatia) 2024	Playoffs for QF	10th	6	1	0	5	57	95	−38
(Serbia) 2026	Main round	10th	7	2	0	5	86	107	−21
Total	Qualified: 7/21		45	10	0	35	409	600	−191

=== Europa Cup ===
Year	Round	Position	Pld	W	D	L	GF	GA	GD
2018	Preliminary round		4	0	1	3	19	42	−23
2019	did not compete								
Total	Participated: 1/2 Qualified for the Super Final: 0/1		4	0	1	3	19	42	−23

== Team ==
=== Current squad ===
Roster for the 2026 Men's European Water Polo Championship.

Head coach: (Greece) Athanasios Kechagias

Name	Date of birth	Pos.	Club
Irakli Razmadze	4 April 1997 (age 29)	GK	(Georgia (country)) A-Polo Sport Management
Saba Tkeshelashvili	14 January 2004 (age 22)	DF	(Georgia (country)) Dinamo Tbilisi
Valiko Dadvani	7 August 2002 (age 23)	DF	(Serbia) Radnički Kragujevac
Nika Shushiashvili	18 April 1999 (age 27)	W	(Hungary) BVSC Manna ABC
Andria Bitadze	17 May 1997 (age 29)	W	(Georgia (country)) A-Polo Sport Management
Dusan Vasić	17 May 1997 (age 29)	W	(Serbia) VK Novi Beograd
Sandro Adeishvili	6 September 1999 (age 26)	CF	(Hungary) BVSC Manna ABC
Jovan Sarić	20 January 1991 (age 35)	W	(Georgia (country)) A-Polo Sport Management
Revaz Imnaishvili (C)	9 August 1997 (age 28)	W	(Georgia (country)) Dinamo Tbilisi
Giorgi Magrakvelidze	21 January 1998 (age 28)	W	(Georgia (country)) Dinamo Tbilisi
Veljko Tankosić	7 November 1997 (age 28)	W	(Italy) CC Ortigia
Stefan Pjesivac	12 December 1996 (age 29)	CF	(Serbia) VK Novi Beograd
Giorgi Gvetadze	13 June 2002 (age 24)	GK	(Georgia (country)) Dinamo Tbilisi
Andrija Vlahović	23 September 1991 (age 34)	DF	(Croatia) VK Solaris
Luka Chikovani	9 July 2004 (age 22)	W	(Romania) CS Dinamo București

=== Notable players ===
- Givi Chikvanaia
- Mikhail Giorgadze
- Leri Gogoladze
- Nodar Gvakhariya
- Georgi Mshvenieradze
- Petre Mshvenieradze
- Revaz Tchomakhidze

=== Naturalized players ===
Damir Crepulja (now Tsrepulia) (MNE), Marko Elez (CRO), Marino Franičević (CRO), Marko Jelača (CRO), Ivan Strujić (CRO), Fabio Baraldi (ITA), Boris Vapenski (SRB)

=== Player statistics ===
Most appearances
Player	Matches	Position|Positions
Zurab Rurua	138	PP
Mikheil Baghaturia	120	PP
Marko Jelaca	100+	HG

== Statistics ==
National team	Total			
National team	Pld	W	D	L
Azerbaijan	1	1		
Belarus	5	3	1	1
China	2	2		
Croatia	3	2		1
Czech Republic	1	1		
Finland	1	1		
France	1			1
Germany	1			1
(United Kingdom) Great Britain	4	4		
Greece	20	15		5
Hungary	7	4		3
(Republic of Ireland) Ireland	1	1		
Israel	3	3		
Italy	2			2
Kazakhstan	1			1
Lithuania	1	1		
Malta	4	2		2
Montenegro	1			1
Netherlands	5		1	4
Poland	5	4		1
Portugal	2	2		
Romania	10	1	1	8
Russia	4			4
Slovakia	5	1	1	3
Spain	1			1
Switzerland	3	3		
Turkey	7	3		4
Ukraine	5	4		1
Total (28)	86	36	4	46

- *includes European B (or Level II) Championship
- **other official (usually announced in LEN calendar) senior tournaments (usually friendly fixtures) – list: Tbilisi Cup (2010, 2012, 2013, 2015), Nodar Gvakharia Cup (2015), Danube Cup (52nd/2014), Tatarstan Cup – Kazan (2015), Aleksei Barkalov Memorial – Kyiv (2010), Ibrahim Sulu Memorial (2015)
