= Irakli Razmadze =

Georgian water polo player

Personal information
- Nationality: Georgian
- Born: 4 April 1997 (age 29)
- Height: 1.95 m (6 ft 5 in)
- Weight: 92 kg (203 lb)

Sport
- Sport: Water polo
- Handedness: right
- Position: Goalkeeper
- Current club: Dinamo Tbilisi

Senior clubs
- Years: Team
- Dinamo Tbilisi
National team
- Years: Team
- Georgia
Medal record
World University Games
Bronze medal – third place	2021 Chengdu	Team

Irakli Razmadze (born 4 April 1997) is a Georgian water polo player for Dinamo Tbilisi and the Georgian national team.

He participated at the 2018 Men's European Water Polo Championship.
