= Andria Bitadze =

Georgian water polo player

Personal information
- Full name: Andria Bitadze
- Nationality: Georgian
- Born: 17 May 1997 (age 29) Tbilisi, Georgia
- Height: 2.03 m (6 ft 8 in)
- Weight: 113 kg (249 lb)

Sport
- Sport: Water polo
- Handedness: Right
- Position: Center forward
- Current club: CC Ortigia
- Number: 7

Senior clubs
- Years: Team
- 2013–2015: Jadran Herceg Novi
- 2015–2016: CN Barcelona
- 2016–2018: Roma Vis Nova
- 2018–2019: VK Crvena Zvezda
- 2019–2022: WPC Dinamo Tbilisi
- 2022–2023: Panionios Water Polo Club
- 2023–: CC Ortigia
National team
- Years: Team
- 2015–: Georgia
Medal record
World University Games
Bronze medal – third place	2021 Chengdu	Team

Andria Bitadze (Georgian: ანდრია ბითაძე; born 17 May 1997) is a Georgian professional water polo player for CC Ortigia and the Georgian national team. Previously he has played for Jadran Herceg Novi, CN Barcelona, VK Crvena Zvezda, Roma vis Nova, WPC Dinamo Tbilisi and Panionios Water Polo Club.

He participated at the 2018 Men's European Water Polo Championship.

== Club career ==
Andria started his youth career in Tbilisi, Georgia at the club Iveria which has become his first junior team. Shortly after winning Georgian championship for several times, he was selected for the junior Georgian national team.

Soon the young talented player continued his career: First in Jadran Herceg Novi where he competed in the senior squad coached by famous Montenegrin water polo player Vladimir Gojković who is currently the coach of the Montenegro men's national water polo team. Second foreign team for the Georgian was CN Barcelona (40 Spanish Championship titles, 19 Spanish League titles), playing División de Honor de Waterpolo, coached by famous Spanish water polo player and coach Toni Esteller.

After clinching the 6th place with CN Barcelona in the national championship, Bitadze continued his career in Rome, becoming the youngest foreign player in Serie A1 for the 2016/2017 season, scoring 9 goals. In the end of the season Roma Vis Nova lost play-out matches and the team was relegated in Serie A2.

For the 2017/2018 season Andria remained in Roma Vis Nova (coach Alessandro Calcaterra) as the only foreign player in the team scoring 18 goals and clinching the 7th place in the championship.

In September 2018 he signed a new contract with a Serbian giant VK Crvena zvezda, the team coached by a legendary player and one of the best coaches in water polo history Dejan Savić, where he was a runner-up of Serbian water polo national championship.

LEN announced a list of clubs which got wild cards for the 2018/19 Champions League Preliminary round. One of the teams is Crvena Zvezda, this will be the debut for the current format of the championship. VK Crvena zvezda won their first and only title in 2012/2013 LEN Champions League season.

After a successful season at VK Crvena zvezda, he returned in Tbilisi to join WPC Dinamo Tbilisi, which for the first time competed in group stage of the LEN Champions League. It was the first time in his career, that he played for a native club on international level. After 3 consecutive seasons, appearing in Champions league together with his hometown club, he continued his foreign journey, by joining Panionios Water Polo Club. With the new club, he managed to reach the semi-finals of the LEN Euro Cup and finishing 4th in the A1 Ethniki Water Polo championship. For the new season, he returned in the Italian Serie A1 (water polo) championship, joining CC Ortigia.

== International career ==
The first selection for the youngster was in 2009 for junior Georgian national team coached by Montenegrin water polo player Jovan Popović. In 2013 Georgia qualified for the LEN Junior Water Polo European U17 Championship held in Malta, Valletta. Next was LEN European U19 Water Polo Championship which was held in capital of Georgia, Tbilisi.

In 2017, Netherlands, Alphen aan den Rijn held the U19 junior European Championship, which came out to be the final one for him.

The debut match for the Senior national team of Georgia took place in Tbilisi on the international LEN tournament against Ukraine. Andria has scored 2 goals in his international debut gaining first victory on the tournament for Georgia.

By far, Georgia men's national water polo team has qualified for three LEN European Aquatics Championships (2014; 2016; 2018; 2020; 2022; 2024) Bitadze's first major tournament was 2016 Men's European Water Polo Championship (coached by Jovan Popović) taking place in Belgrade, Serbia.

He also took part in 2018 Men's European Water Polo Championship held in Spain, Barcelona (coached by Revaz Chomakhidze) following 2 consecutive tournaments, 2020 Men's European Water Polo Championship in Budapest and 2022 Men's European Water Polo Championship in Split, Croatia, where the team made a historical result, by qualifying for the quarter-finals for the first time.

By far he has competed in 4 European championships.

In 2022, Georgia men's national water polo team managed to qualify for the 2022 World Aquatics Championships held in Budapest for the first time in history of the nation. The championship turned out to be a big success for the newly ascending water polo nation. Georgia finished 10th, which is a great achievement for the country.

The year 2023 also turned out to be historical for Georgia. For the first, time it managed to win a medal in a major international competition, 2021 Summer World University Games.

- LEN European Junior Water Polo Championship, 2013, Malta, Valletta - 13th Place
- LEN European Junior Water Polo Championship, 2014, Georgia, Tbilisi - 16th Place
- LEN European U19 Water Polo Championship, 2016 - 10th Place
- 2016 Men's European Water Polo Championship, Serbia, Belgrade - 14th Place
- 2018 Men's European Water Polo Championship, Spain, Barcelona - 13th Place
- 2020 Men's European Water Polo Championship, Hungary, Budapest - 10th Place
- 2022 Men's European Water Polo Championship, Croatia, Split - 8th Place
- Water polo at the 2022 World Aquatics Championships – Men's tournament, Hungary, Budapest - 10th Place
- 2021 Summer World University Games, China, Chengdu - 3rd Place
