= Dinamo Tbilisi =

Georgian sports club

- Founded: 1925; 101 years ago
- Based in: Tbilisi, Georgia

Dinamo Tbilisi is a sports club from Tbilisi, Georgia. It was founded in 1925.

Among its highest honors, is the European trophy earned by its football team which won the Cup Winners' Cup in 1981, beating FC Carl Zeiss Jena of East Germany 2–1 in the final in Düsseldorf.

In basketball, the club won the European Champions Cup in 1962, against Real Madrid in the final, and also was the European Champions Cup finalist in 1960.

The club teams include:

- FC Dinamo Tbilisi – Men's football team
- BC Dinamo Tbilisi – Men's basketball team
- WC Dinamo Tbilisi – Men's water polo team
- Dinamo Tbilisi – Men's rugby union team
