= Georgia at the 2011 World Aquatics Championships =

Sporting event delegation

Flag of Georgia

Georgia competed at the 2011 World Aquatics Championships in Shanghai, China between July 16 and 31, 2011.

== Diving ==
Georgia has qualified 2 athletes in diving.

Men

Athlete	Event	Preliminary		Semifinals		Final	
Athlete	Event	Points	Rank	Points	Rank	Points	Rank
Chola Chanturia	Men's 3m Springboard	356.45	36	did not advance			
Shota Korakhashvili	Men's 3m Springboard	313.50	44	did not advance			
Chola Chanturia; Shota Korakhashvili	Men's 3m Synchro Springboard	354.93	12 Q			365.13	12

== Swimming ==
Georgia qualified 2 swimmers.

Men

Athlete	Event	Heats		Semifinals		Final	
Athlete	Event	Time	Rank	Time	Rank	Time	Rank
Irakli Revishvili	Men's 200m Freestyle	1:54.02	46	did not advance			
Irakli Revishvili	Men's 400m Freestyle	4:02.97	36			did not advance	
Irakli Bolkvadze	Men's 200m Breaststroke	2:18.42	38	did not advance			
Irakli Bolkvadze	Men's 200m IM	2:07.29	37	did not advance			
