= Water polo at the 2025 World Aquatics Championships – Men's team rosters =

This article shows the roster of all participating teams at the men's water polo tournament at the 2025 World Aquatics Championships.

== Group A ==
=== Italy ===
The following is the Italian roster.

Head coach: Sandro Campagna

- 1 Gianmarco Nicosia GK
- 2 Francesco Di Fulvio FP
- 3 Luca Damonte FP
- 4 Giacomo Cannella FP
- 5 Filippo Ferrero FP
- 6 Tommaso Gianazza FP
- 7 Mario del Basso FP
- 8 Francesco Condemi FP
- 9 Nicholas Presciutti FP
- 10 Lorenzo Bruni FP
- 11 Edoardo Di Somma FP
- 12 Alessandro Velotto FP
- 13 Tommaso Baggi Necchi GK
- 14 Francesco Lorenzo Cassia FP
- 15 Matteo Iocchi Gratta FP

=== Romania ===
The following is the Romanian roster.

Head coach: Bogdan Rath

- 1 Marius-Florin Tic GK
- 2 Francesco Iudean FP
- 3 Matei-Ioan Lutescu FP
- 4 Tudor-Andrei Fulea FP
- 5 Andrei Neamtu FP
- 6 Andrei Prioteasa FP
- 7 Andrei Tepelus FP
- 8 Nicolae Olanta FP
- 9 Alexandru Gheorghe FP
- 10 Vlad-Luca Georgescu FP
- 11 Sebastian Oltean FP
- 12 Levente Vancsik FP
- 13 Eduard-Mihai Dragusin GK
- 14 David Belenyesi FP
- 15 David-Joan Bota FP

=== Serbia ===
The following is the Serbian roster.

Head coach: Uroš Stevanović

- 1 Radoslav Filipović GK
- 2 Dušan Mandić FP
- 3 Strahinja Rašović FP
- 4 Sava Ranđelović FP
- 5 Miloš Ćuk FP
- 6 Nikola Murišić FP
- 7 Đorđe Lazić FP
- 8 Nikola Jakšić FP
- 9 Nemanja Vico FP
- 10 Boris Vapenski FP
- 11 Petar Jakšić FP
- 12 Viktor Rašović FP
- 13 Lazar Dobožanov GK
- 14 Vasilije Martinović FP
- 15 Vuk Milojević FP

=== South Africa ===
The following is the South African roster.

Head coach: Grant MacKenzie

- 1 Luka Rajak GK
- 2 Nathan Ward FP
- 3 Manqoba Bungane FP
- 4 Dean Sneddon FP
- 5 Calvin Kuperus FP
- 6 Carl Germishuys FP
- 7 Dylan Watt FP
- 8 Ryan Sneddon FP
- 9 Matthew Bowers FP
- 10 Kelly Geldenhuys FP
- 11 Matthew Neser FP
- 12 Tristan Grimmett FP
- 13 Matthew Smith GK
- 14 Brett Sneddon FP

== Group B ==
=== Australia ===
The following is the Australian roster.

Head coach: Timothy Hamill

- 1 Nick Porter GK
- 2 Angus Lambie FP
- 3 Miloš Maksimović FP
- 4 Charlie Negus FP
- 5 Nathan Power FP
- 6 Timothy Putt FP
- 7 Luka Krstic FP
- 8 Jacob Mercep FP
- 9 Matthew Byrnes FP
- 10 Marcus Berehulak FP
- 11 Sam Nangle FP
- 12 Tristan Glanznig FP
- 13 Laurence Barker GK
- 14 Andrej Grgurevic FP
- 15 Drew McJannett FP

=== Hungary ===
The following is the Hungarian roster.

Head coach: Zsolt Varga

- 1 Kristóf Csoma GK
- 2 Dániel Angyal FP
- 3 Krisztián Manhercz FP
- 4 Erik Molnár FP
- 5 Márton Vámos FP
- 6 Ádám Nagy FP
- 7 Gergő Fekete FP
- 8 Gergely Burián FP
- 9 Péter Kovács FP
- 10 Vendel Vigvári FP
- 11 Szilárd Jansik FP
- 12 Vince Vigvári FP
- 13 Márton Mizsei GK
- 14 Ákos Nagy FP
- 15 Zsombor Vismeg FP

=== Japan ===
The following is the Japanese roster.

Head coach: Yoshinori Shiota

- 1 Towa Nishimura GK
- 2 Seiya Adachi FP
- 3 Taiyo Watanabe FP
- 4 Toshiyuki Maeda FP
- 5 Enishi Ura FP
- 6 Toi Suzuki FP
- 7 Kiyomu Date FP
- 8 Mitsuru Takata FP
- 9 Ikkei Nitta FP
- 10 Yusuke Inaba FP
- 11 Daichi Ogihara FP
- 12 Kenta Araki FP
- 13 Ren Sasano GK
- 14 Jun Lowrey FP
- 15 Yuki Moriya FP

=== Spain ===
The following is the Spanish roster.

Head coach: David Martín

- 1 Unai Aguirre GK
- 2 Alberto Munárriz FP
- 3 Álvaro Granados FP
- 4 Bernat Sanahuja FP
- 5 Miguel del Toro FP
- 6 Marc Larumbe FP
- 7 José Javier Bustos Sánchez FP
- 8 Sergi Cabanas FP
- 9 Roger Tahull FP
- 10 Felipe Perrone FP
- 11 Unai Biel FP
- 12 Alejandro Bustos FP
- 13 Eduardo Lorrio GK
- 14 Biel Gomila Faiges FP
- 15 Fran Valera FP

== Group C ==
=== Brazil ===
The following is Brazilian roster.

Head coach: Thiago Nascimento

- 1 João Gabriel Silveira GK
- 2 Logan Cabral FP
- 3 Gabriel da Silva FP
- 4 Gustavo Coutinho FP
- 5 André Luiz Freitas FP
- 6 Marcos Paulo Pedroso FP
- 7 Lucas Farias FP
- 8 Pedro Real FP
- 9 Paulo Ricardo Oliveira FP
- 10 Lucas Andrade FP
- 11 Gustavo Guimarães FP
- 12 Luis Ricardo Silva FP
- 13 João Pedro Fernandes GK
- 14 Joao Pedro Leme FP
- 15 Lucas Wulfhorst FP

=== Canada ===
The following is the Canadian roster.

Head coach: Patrick Oaten

- 1 Milan Radenovic GK
- 2 Ali Oussadou FP
- 3 Bogdan Djerkovic FP
- 4 Jérémie Côté FP
- 5 Nikos Gerakoudis FP
- 6 David Lapins FP
- 7 Roko Pozaric FP
- 8 Bor Tanasijevic FP
- 9 Aleksa Gardijan FP
- 10 Aria Soleimanipak FP
- 11 Jason O'Donnell FP
- 12 Reuel D'Souza FP
- 13 Brody McKnight GK
- 14 Andrej Gavric FP
- 15 Leo Hachem FP

=== Singapore ===
The following is the Singaporean roster.

Head coach: Kan Aoyagi

- 1 Chou Ken GK
- 2 Loh Zhi Zhi FP
- 3 Fong Wai Chun FP
- 4 Goh Wen Zhe FP
- 5 Loh de Jun Cayde FP
- 6 Yap Dong Xuan Ryan FP
- 7 Chan Dominic Bo Xun FP
- 8 Lok Shaunn Blasius Jun Jie FP
- 9 Sanjiv Rajandra FP
- 10 Sajk Justin Kin Yan FP
- 11 See Tien Ee Jayden FP
- 12 Koh Jian Ying FP
- 13 Lee Lee Kai Yang GK
- 14 Matthias Goh FP
- 15 Lee Darren Jit An GK

=== United States ===
The following is the American roster.

Head coach: Dejan Udovičić

- 1 Adrian Weinberg GK
- 2 Jack Larsen FP
- 3 Marko Vavic FP
- 4 Nicolas Saveljic FP
- 5 Hannes Daube FP
- 6 Ben Liecht FP
- 7 Connor Ohl FP
- 8 Dylan Woodhead FP
- 9 Jake Ehrhardt FP
- 10 Chase Dodd FP
- 11 Ryder Dodd FP
- 12 Max Irving FP
- 13 Bernardo Herzer GK
- 14 Ryan Ohl FP
- 15 Dom Brown FP

== Group D ==
=== China ===
The following is the Chinese roster.

Head coach: Ivan Asič/Chen Weihan

- 1 Wu Honghui GK
- 2 Liu Yu FP
- 3 Li Deming FP
- 4 Peng Jiahao FP
- 5 Cai Yuhao FP
- 6 Xie Zekai FP
- 7 Chen Zhongxian FP
- 8 Chen Rui FP
- 9 Chen Yimin FP
- 10 Zhu Jiashao FP
- 11 Wen Zijun FP
- 12 Shen Dingsong FP
- 13 Wu Yongxiang GK
- 14 Wang Beiyi FP
- 15 Liu Zhilong FP

=== Croatia ===
The following is the Croatian roster.

Head coach: Ivica Tucak

- 1 Marko Bijač GK
- 2 Rino Burić FP
- 3 Loren Fatović FP
- 4 Luka Lončar FP
- 5 Franko Lazić FP
- 6 Luka Bukić FP
- 7 Ante Vukičević FP
- 8 Marko Žuvela FP
- 9 Filip Kržić FP
- 10 Josip Vrlić FP
- 11 Zvonimir Butić FP
- 12 Konstantin Kharkov FP
- 13 Toni Popadić GK
- 14 Matias Biljaka FP
- 15 Tin Brubnjak FP

=== Greece ===
The following is the Greek roster.

Head coach: Theodoros Vlachos

- 1 Panagiotis Tzortzatos GK
- 2 Konstantinos Genidounias FP
- 3 Dimitrios Skoumpakis FP
- 4 Konstantinos Gkiouvetsis FP
- 5 Stylianos Argyropoulos FP
- 6 Aristeidis Chalyvopoulos FP
- 7 Nikolaos Gkillas FP
- 8 Efstathios Kalogeropoulos FP
- 9 Ioannis Alafragkis FP
- 10 Konstantinos Kakaris FP
- 11 Dimitrios Nikolaidis FP
- 12 Nikolaos Papanikolaou FP
- 13 Emmanouil Andreadis GK
- 14 Evangelos Pouros FP
- 15 Nikolaos Gardikas FP

=== Montenegro ===
The following is the Montenegrin roster.

Head coach: Dejan Savić

- 1 Petar Tešanović GK
- 2 Dmitrii Kholod FP
- 3 Đuro Radović FP
- 4 Dimitrije Obradović FP
- 5 Aljoša Macic FP
- 6 Jovan Vujović FP
- 7 Savo Ćetković FP
- 8 Filip Gardašević FP
- 9 Miroslav Perković FP
- 10 Dušan Banićević FP
- 11 Dušan Matković FP
- 12 Vasilije Radović FP
- 13 Lazar Andrić GK
- 14 Balša Vučković FP
- 15 Strahinja Gojković FP
