= 2025–26 European Aquatics Champions League group stage =

Tournament information
- Sport: Water polo
- Date: 14 October – 11 December 2025
- Tournament format: Round robin
- Teams: 16
- Website: Official website

Tournament statistics
- Matches played: 48
- Goals scored: 1303 (27.15 per match)

The 2025–26 European Aquatics Champions League main round is played between 14 October and 11 December 2025 to determine the eight teams advancing to the Quarter-finals round of the 2025–26 European Aquatics Champions League.

== Format ==
The 16 teams were place into four groups of four. In each group, teams will play against each other home-and-away in a round-robin format. The top two teams in each group advanced to the Quarter-finals round.

Teams are ranked according to points (3 points for a win, 2 points for a penalty shootout win, 1 point for a penalty shootout loss, 0 points for a loss), and if tied on points, the following tiebreaking criteria are applied, in the order given, to determine the rankings:

- Points in head-to-head matches among tied teams;
- Goal difference in head-to-head matches among tied teams;
- Goals scored in head-to-head matches among tied teams;
- Goal difference in all group matches;
- Goals scored in all group matches.

== Draw ==
External videos
- 2025–26 European Aquatics Champions League group stage – Draw
- Draw

The draw was on 28 July 2025 in Zagreb, Croatia. The seeding was based on the men's club rankings. The only restriction was that clubs from the same country could not be drawn against each other. The six teams from the qualifiers were not known at the time of the draw and could not be drawn into the same group.

Key to colours
Group winners and runners-up advance to Quarter-finals round

Pot 1
Team	Ranking	Points
(Hungary) FTC-Telekom	1	40,502.5
(Italy) Pro Recco	3	36,000
(Spain) Zodiac Atlètic-Barceloneta	4	32,985
(Greece) Olympiacos SF Piraeus	5	30,137.5

Pot 2
Team	Ranking	Points
(France) CN Marseille	6	26,877.5
(Croatia) Jadran Split	8	21,285
(Serbia) Radnički Kragujevac	14	12,240
(Romania) CSM Oradea	15	11,627.5

Pot 3
Team	Ranking	Points
(Germany) Waspo'98 Hannover	21	10,282.5
(Montenegro) Jadran m:tel Herceg Novi	22	9,442.5
(Montenegro) Primorac Kotor (Note: Team not known at the time of the draw. Was the Group A winner in qualification.)	25	8,835
(Hungary) Vasas SC (Note: Team not known at the time of the draw. Was the Group B winner in qualification.)	12	13,515

Pot 4
Team	Ranking	Points
(Croatia) HAVK Mladost Zagreb (Note: Team not known at the time of the draw. Was the Group C winner in qualification.)	23	9,435
(Serbia) Novi Beograd (Note: Team not known at the time of the draw. Was the Group A runners-up in qualification.)	2	37,935
(Spain) KEIO CN Sabadell (Note: Team not known at the time of the draw. Was the Group B runners-up in qualification.)	10	19,127.5
(Italy) AN Brescia (Note: Team not known at the time of the draw. Was the Group C runners-up in qualification.)	7	21,942.5

== Groups ==
=== Group A ===
Pos	Team	Pld	W	PSW	PSL	L	GF	GA	GD	Pts	Qualification	OLY	MLA	RAD	VAS
1	(Greece) Olympiacos Piraeus	6	4	1	0	1	85	59	+26	14	Advance to Quarter-finals round	—	13–9	16–14 (Note: Match ended 11–11. Olympiacos Piraeus won 5–3 on penalties.)	20–8
2	(Croatia) HAVK Mladost Zagreb	6	4	0	0	2	79	78	+1	12	Advance to Quarter-finals round	14–13	—	17–15	15–13
3	(Serbia) Radnički Kragujevac	6	3	0	1	2	84	81	+3	10	Transfer to Euro Cup	12–13	14–11	—	17–16
4	(Hungary) Vasas SC	6	0	0	0	6	65	95	−30	0	Transfer to Euro Cup	5–15	10–13	13–15	—

Source: European Aquatics Champions League

14 October 2025; 18:00	Report	Olympiacos Piraeus (Greece)	13–9	(Croatia) HAVK Mladost Zagreb	Papastrateio "Petros Kapagerof" Pool, Piraeus; Referees: Raffaele Colombo (ITA), Matan Schwartz (ISR)
14 October 2025; 18:00	Report	Score by quarters: 2–3, 4–1, 5–4, 2–1			Papastrateio "Petros Kapagerof" Pool, Piraeus; Referees: Raffaele Colombo (ITA), Matan Schwartz (ISR)
14 October 2025; 18:00	Report	Zalánki 6	Goals	Nagaev 2	Papastrateio "Petros Kapagerof" Pool, Piraeus; Referees: Raffaele Colombo (ITA), Matan Schwartz (ISR)

14 October 2025; 18:00	Report	Radnički Kragujevac (Serbia)	17–16	(Hungary) Vasas SC	Sports Center Park, Kragujevac; Referees: David Gomez Pordomingo (ESP), Alessandro Severo (ITA)
14 October 2025; 18:00	Report	Score by quarters: 3–5, 6–4, 5–3, 3–4			Sports Center Park, Kragujevac; Referees: David Gomez Pordomingo (ESP), Alessandro Severo (ITA)
14 October 2025; 18:00	Report	Prlainović 6	Goals	Gyárfás 5	Sports Center Park, Kragujevac; Referees: David Gomez Pordomingo (ESP), Alessandro Severo (ITA)

28 October 2025; 20:30	Report	Vasas SC (Hungary)	5–15	(Greece) Olympiacos Piraeus	Császár-Komjádi Béla Sport Swimming Pool, Budapest; Referees: Boris Margeta (SLO), Veselin Miskovic (MNE)
28 October 2025; 20:30	Report	Score by quarters: 2–5, 0–3, 3–5, 0–2			Császár-Komjádi Béla Sport Swimming Pool, Budapest; Referees: Boris Margeta (SLO), Veselin Miskovic (MNE)
28 October 2025; 20:30	Report	Lakatos 2	Goals	Dimou, Nikolaidis 3	Császár-Komjádi Béla Sport Swimming Pool, Budapest; Referees: Boris Margeta (SLO), Veselin Miskovic (MNE)

28 October 2025; 19:00	Report	HAVK Mladost Zagreb (Croatia)	17–15	(Serbia) Radnički Kragujevac	Bazen Mladost, Zagreb; Referees: Michiel Zwart (NED), Massimo Calabro (ITA)
28 October 2025; 19:00	Report	Score by quarters: 5–5, 2–3, 6–4, 4–3			Bazen Mladost, Zagreb; Referees: Michiel Zwart (NED), Massimo Calabro (ITA)
28 October 2025; 19:00	Report	Bukić 4	Goals	three players 3	Bazen Mladost, Zagreb; Referees: Michiel Zwart (NED), Massimo Calabro (ITA)

11 November 2025; 20:30	Report	Vasas SC (Hungary)	10–13	(Croatia) HAVK Mladost Zagreb	Császár-Komjádi Béla Sport Swimming Pool, Budapest; Referees: Francesc Xavier Buch Juanola (ESP), Frank Ohme (GER)
11 November 2025; 20:30	Report	Score by quarters: 2–3, 1–2, 3–3, 4–5			Császár-Komjádi Béla Sport Swimming Pool, Budapest; Referees: Francesc Xavier Buch Juanola (ESP), Frank Ohme (GER)
11 November 2025; 20:30	Report	three players 2	Goals	Kharkov 3	Császár-Komjádi Béla Sport Swimming Pool, Budapest; Referees: Francesc Xavier Buch Juanola (ESP), Frank Ohme (GER)

12 November 2025; 19:00	Report	Radnički Kragujevac (Serbia)	12–13	(Greece) Olympiacos Piraeus	Sports Center Park, Kragujevac; Referees: Matan Schwartz (ISR), Peter De Jong (NED)
12 November 2025; 19:00	Report	Score by quarters: 1–3, 3–3, 6–4, 2–3			Sports Center Park, Kragujevac; Referees: Matan Schwartz (ISR), Peter De Jong (NED)
12 November 2025; 19:00	Report	five players 2	Goals	Zalánki 5	Sports Center Park, Kragujevac; Referees: Matan Schwartz (ISR), Peter De Jong (NED)

18 November 2025; 18:00	Report	HAVK Mladost Zagreb (Croatia)	14–13	(Greece) Olympiacos Piraeus	Bazen Mladost, Zagreb; Referees: Alessandro Severo (ITA), Michiel Zwart (NED)
18 November 2025; 18:00	Report	Score by quarters: 3–4, 3–3, 2–3, 6–3			Bazen Mladost, Zagreb; Referees: Alessandro Severo (ITA), Michiel Zwart (NED)
18 November 2025; 18:00	Report	Nagaev 3	Goals	Genidounias 3	Bazen Mladost, Zagreb; Referees: Alessandro Severo (ITA), Michiel Zwart (NED)

19 November 2025; 20:30	Report	Vasas SC (Hungary)	13–15	(Serbia) Radnički Kragujevac	Császár-Komjádi Béla Sport Swimming Pool, Budapest; Referees: Sebastien Dervieux (FRA), Alex Marquez Mas (ESP)
19 November 2025; 20:30	Report	Score by quarters: 3–4, 3–4, 4–5, 3–2			Császár-Komjádi Béla Sport Swimming Pool, Budapest; Referees: Sebastien Dervieux (FRA), Alex Marquez Mas (ESP)
19 November 2025; 20:30	Report	Bátori 5	Goals	Vlachopoulos 5	Császár-Komjádi Béla Sport Swimming Pool, Budapest; Referees: Sebastien Dervieux (FRA), Alex Marquez Mas (ESP)

2 December 2025; 19:00	Report	Olympiacos Piraeus (Greece)	20–8	(Hungary) Vasas SC	Papastrateio "Petros Kapagerof" Pool, Piraeus; Referees: David Gomez Pordomingo (ESP), Hendrik Schopp (GER)
2 December 2025; 19:00	Report	Score by quarters: 6–1, 4–2, 6–1, 4–4			Papastrateio "Petros Kapagerof" Pool, Piraeus; Referees: David Gomez Pordomingo (ESP), Hendrik Schopp (GER)
2 December 2025; 19:00	Report	Kakaris 4	Goals	Đurđić, Gábor 2	Papastrateio "Petros Kapagerof" Pool, Piraeus; Referees: David Gomez Pordomingo (ESP), Hendrik Schopp (GER)

2 December 2025; 19:00	Report	Radnički Kragujevac (Serbia)	14–11	(Croatia) HAVK Mladost Zagreb	Sports Center Park, Kragujevac; Referees: Boris Margeta (SLO), Frank Ohme (GER)
2 December 2025; 19:00	Report	Score by quarters: 0–4, 4–3, 6–4, 4–0			Sports Center Park, Kragujevac; Referees: Boris Margeta (SLO), Frank Ohme (GER)
2 December 2025; 19:00	Report	Prlainović 5	Goals	Kharkov, Lazić 2	Sports Center Park, Kragujevac; Referees: Boris Margeta (SLO), Frank Ohme (GER)

11 February 2026; 18:00	Report	HAVK Mladost Zagreb (Croatia)	15–13	(Hungary) Vasas SC	Bazen Mladost, Zagreb; Referees: Massimo Calabro (ITA), Hendrik Schopp (GER)
11 February 2026; 18:00	Report	Score by quarters: 4–2, 3–1, 5–4, 3–6			Bazen Mladost, Zagreb; Referees: Massimo Calabro (ITA), Hendrik Schopp (GER)
11 February 2026; 18:00	Report	Kharkov 5	Goals	Szalai 5	Bazen Mladost, Zagreb; Referees: Massimo Calabro (ITA), Hendrik Schopp (GER)

11 February 2026; 18:00	Report	Olympiacos Piraeus (Greece)	16–14 (PSO)	(Serbia) Radnički Kragujevac	Papastrateio "Petros Kapagerof" Pool, Piraeus; Referees: Sebastien Dervieux (FRA), Pau Segurana Ferre (ESP)
11 February 2026; 18:00	Report	Score by quarters: 4–1, 3–3, 3–4, 1–3 PSO: 5–3			Papastrateio "Petros Kapagerof" Pool, Piraeus; Referees: Sebastien Dervieux (FRA), Pau Segurana Ferre (ESP)
11 February 2026; 18:00	Report	Fountoulis, Nikolaidis 3	Goals	Pijetlović 3	Papastrateio "Petros Kapagerof" Pool, Piraeus; Referees: Sebastien Dervieux (FRA), Pau Segurana Ferre (ESP)

=== Group B ===
Pos	Team	Pld	W	PSW	PSL	L	GF	GA	GD	Pts	Qualification	PRO	NOV	HER	JAD
1	(Italy) Pro Recco	6	6	0	0	0	90	59	+31	18	Advance to Quarter-finals round	—	13–9	16–7	15–9
2	(Serbia) Novi Beograd Tehnomanija (Note: Name was changed on matchday 6.)	6	3	0	0	3	68	66	+2	9	Advance to Quarter-finals round	8–12	—	11–12	15–10
3	(Montenegro) Jadran m:tel Herceg Novi	6	2	0	0	4	71	87	−16	6	Transfer to Euro Cup	13–19	12–15	—	14–11
4	(Croatia) Jadran Split	6	1	0	0	5	65	82	−17	3	Transfer to Euro Cup	13–15	7–10	15–13	—

Source: European Aquatics Champions League

14 October 2025; 18:00	Report	Jadran m:tel Herceg Novi (Montenegro)	14–11	(Croatia) Jadran Split	Leotar Swimming Club, Trebinje (Note: Due to not having a venue that meets requirements, Jadran Herceg Novi plays their home games in Trebinje, Bosnia and Herzegovina.); Referees: Georgios Stavridis (GRE), Gyorgy Kun (HUN)
14 October 2025; 18:00	Report	Score by quarters: 4–3, 3–2, 5–2, 2–4			Leotar Swimming Club, Trebinje; Referees: Georgios Stavridis (GRE), Gyorgy Kun (HUN)
14 October 2025; 18:00	Report	Janović, Stupar 3	Goals	Fatović, Matković 3	Leotar Swimming Club, Trebinje; Referees: Georgios Stavridis (GRE), Gyorgy Kun (HUN)

15 October 2025; 20:30	Report	Novi Beograd (Serbia)	8–12	(Italy) Pro Recco	11th April Sports and Recreation Center, Belgrade; Referees: Tamás Kovács-Csatlós (HUN), Sebastien Dervieux (FRA)
15 October 2025; 20:30	Report	Score by quarters: 0–4, 2–2, 3–2, 3–4			11th April Sports and Recreation Center, Belgrade; Referees: Tamás Kovács-Csatlós (HUN), Sebastien Dervieux (FRA)
15 October 2025; 20:30	Report	Martinović 3	Goals	Condemi 3	11th April Sports and Recreation Center, Belgrade; Referees: Tamás Kovács-Csatlós (HUN), Sebastien Dervieux (FRA)

28 October 2025; 18:00	Report	Pro Recco (Italy)	16–7	(Montenegro) Jadran m:tel Herceg Novi	Municipal Swimming Pool, Sori; Referees: Matan Schwartz (ISR), Konstantinos Vasileiou (GRE)
28 October 2025; 18:00	Report	Score by quarters: 5–1, 3–1, 4–3, 4–2			Municipal Swimming Pool, Sori; Referees: Matan Schwartz (ISR), Konstantinos Vasileiou (GRE)
28 October 2025; 18:00	Report	Granados 4	Goals	Kholod, Sladović 2	Municipal Swimming Pool, Sori; Referees: Matan Schwartz (ISR), Konstantinos Vasileiou (GRE)

24 October 2025; 20:30	Report	Jadran Split (Croatia)	7–10	(Serbia) Novi Beograd	Sports Center Poljud, Split; Referees: Xavier Francesc Buch Juanola (ESP), Norbert Ercse (HUN)
24 October 2025; 20:30	Report	Score by quarters: 3–3, 2–3, 1–2, 1–2			Sports Center Poljud, Split; Referees: Xavier Francesc Buch Juanola (ESP), Norbert Ercse (HUN)
24 October 2025; 20:30	Report	Berehulak 2	Goals	Martinović 3	Sports Center Poljud, Split; Referees: Xavier Francesc Buch Juanola (ESP), Norbert Ercse (HUN)

11 November 2025; 18:00	Report	Pro Recco (Italy)	15–9	(Croatia) Jadran Split	Municipal Swimming Pool, Sori; Referees: Boris Margeta (SLO), Hendrik Schopp (GER)
11 November 2025; 18:00	Report	Score by quarters: 6–2, 4–2, 3–1, 2–4			Municipal Swimming Pool, Sori; Referees: Boris Margeta (SLO), Hendrik Schopp (GER)
11 November 2025; 18:00	Report	Cassia 4	Goals	Butić 3	Municipal Swimming Pool, Sori; Referees: Boris Margeta (SLO), Hendrik Schopp (GER)

11 November 2025; 20:30	Report	Novi Beograd (Serbia)	11–12	(Montenegro) Jadran m:tel Herceg Novi	11th April Sports and Recreation Center, Belgrade; Referees: David Gomez Pordomingo (ESP), Tamás Kovács-Csatlós (HUN)
11 November 2025; 20:30	Report	Score by quarters: 4–2, 0–3, 4–4, 3–3			11th April Sports and Recreation Center, Belgrade; Referees: David Gomez Pordomingo (ESP), Tamás Kovács-Csatlós (HUN)
11 November 2025; 20:30	Report	Ćuk, Martinović 3	Goals	Gojković, Radović 3	11th April Sports and Recreation Center, Belgrade; Referees: David Gomez Pordomingo (ESP), Tamás Kovács-Csatlós (HUN)

19 November 2025; 18:30	Report	Jadran Split (Croatia)	15–13	(Montenegro) Jadran m:tel Herceg Novi	Sports Center Poljud, Split; Referees: Matan Schwartz (ISR), Nikolaos Boudramis (GRE)
19 November 2025; 18:30	Report	Score by quarters: 5–2, 4–3, 4–5, 2–3			Sports Center Poljud, Split; Referees: Matan Schwartz (ISR), Nikolaos Boudramis (GRE)
19 November 2025; 18:30	Report	Fatović 5	Goals	Janović 4	Sports Center Poljud, Split; Referees: Matan Schwartz (ISR), Nikolaos Boudramis (GRE)

19 November 2025; 20:30	Report	Pro Recco (Italy)	13–9	(Serbia) Novi Beograd	Municipal Swimming Pool, Sori; Referees: Frank Ohme (GER), Peter De Jong (NED)
19 November 2025; 20:30	Report	Score by quarters: 3–2, 3–3, 5–2, 2–2			Municipal Swimming Pool, Sori; Referees: Frank Ohme (GER), Peter De Jong (NED)
19 November 2025; 20:30	Report	Granados 3	Goals	three players 2	Municipal Swimming Pool, Sori; Referees: Frank Ohme (GER), Peter De Jong (NED)

2 December 2025; 20:30	Report	Novi Beograd (Serbia)	15–10	(Croatia) Jadran Split	11th April Sports and Recreation Center, Belgrade; Referees: Georgios Stavridis (GRE), Gyorgy Kun (HUN)
2 December 2025; 20:30	Report	Score by quarters: 2–4, 3–3, 4–2, 6–1			11th April Sports and Recreation Center, Belgrade; Referees: Georgios Stavridis (GRE), Gyorgy Kun (HUN)
2 December 2025; 20:30	Report	Ćuk, Perković 4	Goals	Berehulak 4	11th April Sports and Recreation Center, Belgrade; Referees: Georgios Stavridis (GRE), Gyorgy Kun (HUN)

3 December 2025; 18:30	Report	Jadran m:tel Herceg Novi (Montenegro)	13–19	(Italy) Pro Recco	Leotar Swimming Club, Trebinje (Note: Due to not having a venue that meets requirements, Jadran Herceg Novi plays their home games in Trebinje, Bosnia and Herzegovina.); Referees: Julien Bourges (FRA), Alex Marquez Mas (ESP)
3 December 2025; 18:30	Report	Score by quarters: 3–3, 2–6, 2–6, 6–4			Leotar Swimming Club, Trebinje; Referees: Julien Bourges (FRA), Alex Marquez Mas (ESP)
3 December 2025; 18:30	Report	Lazić 3	Goals	Irving 5	Leotar Swimming Club, Trebinje; Referees: Julien Bourges (FRA), Alex Marquez Mas (ESP)

11 February 2026; 20:00	Report	Jadran Split (Croatia)	13–15	(Italy) Pro Recco	Sports Center Poljud, Split; Referees: Norbert Ercse (HUN), Ralf Mueller (GER)
11 February 2026; 20:00	Report	Score by quarters: 4–4, 1–2, 3–4, 5–5			Sports Center Poljud, Split; Referees: Norbert Ercse (HUN), Ralf Mueller (GER)
11 February 2026; 20:00	Report	Kragić 3	Goals	Di Fulvio, Granados 3	Sports Center Poljud, Split; Referees: Norbert Ercse (HUN), Ralf Mueller (GER)

11 February 2026; 18:00	Report	Jadran m:tel Herceg Novi (Montenegro)	12–15	(Serbia) Novi Beograd Tehnomanija	Leotar Swimming Club, Trebinje (Note: Due to not having a venue that meets requirements, Jadran Herceg Novi plays their home games in Trebinje, Bosnia and Herzegovina.); Referees: Georgios Stavridis (GRE), Julien Bourges (FRA)
11 February 2026; 18:00	Report	Score by quarters: 2–4, 1–5, 2–4, 7–2			Leotar Swimming Club, Trebinje; Referees: Georgios Stavridis (GRE), Julien Bourges (FRA)
11 February 2026; 18:00	Report	Gojković 4	Goals	Martinović 4	Leotar Swimming Club, Trebinje; Referees: Georgios Stavridis (GRE), Julien Bourges (FRA)

=== Group C ===
Pos	Team	Pld	W	PSW	PSL	L	GF	GA	GD	Pts	Qualification	FTC	BRE	ORA	KOT
1	(Hungary) FTC-Telekom	6	5	0	1	0	120	75	+45	16	Advance to Quarter-finals round	—	13–16 (Note: Match ended 12–12. AN Brescia won 4–1 on penalties.)	19–11	26–15
2	(Italy) AN Brescia	6	4	1	0	1	95	86	+9	14	Advance to Quarter-finals round	17–21	—	–	19–16
3	(Romania) CSM Oradea	6	1	0	0	5	65	91	−26	3 (Note: CSM Oradea 25–22 Primorac Kotor)	Transfer to Euro Cup	5–17	11–16	—	14–7
4	(Montenegro) Primorac Kotor	6	1	0	0	5	81	109	−28	3	Transfer to Euro Cup	15–25	13–14	15–11	—

Source: European Aquatics Champions League
Notes:

15 October 2025; 18:30	Report	FTC-Telekom (Hungary)	19–11	(Romania) CSM Oradea	Császár-Komjádi Béla Sport Swimming Pool, Budapest; Referees: Jakov Blaskovic (CRO), Christos Kourtidis (GRE)
15 October 2025; 18:30	Report	Score by quarters: 4–3, 7–1, 3–3, 5–4			Császár-Komjádi Béla Sport Swimming Pool, Budapest; Referees: Jakov Blaskovic (CRO), Christos Kourtidis (GRE)
15 October 2025; 18:30	Report	Vismeg 5	Goals	Gardašević 4	Császár-Komjádi Béla Sport Swimming Pool, Budapest; Referees: Jakov Blaskovic (CRO), Christos Kourtidis (GRE)

14 October 2025; 19:00	Report	Primorac Kotor (Montenegro)	13–14	(Italy) AN Brescia	Nikša Bućin Swimming Pool, Kotor; Referees: Francesc Xavier Buch Juanola (ESP), Julien Bourges (FRA)
14 October 2025; 19:00	Report	Score by quarters: 3–3, 4–4, 3–5, 3–2			Nikša Bućin Swimming Pool, Kotor; Referees: Francesc Xavier Buch Juanola (ESP), Julien Bourges (FRA)
14 October 2025; 19:00	Report	Mrsic 4	Goals	three players 3	Nikša Bućin Swimming Pool, Kotor; Referees: Francesc Xavier Buch Juanola (ESP), Julien Bourges (FRA)

28 October 2025; 18:00	Report	CSM Oradea (Romania)	14–7	(Montenegro) Primorac Kotor	Bazinul Olimpic Ioan Alexandrescu, Oradea; Referees: Jaume Teixido Bermudez (ESP), Gernot Haentschel (GER)
28 October 2025; 18:00	Report	Score by quarters: 4–1, 2–2, 5–1, 3–3			Bazinul Olimpic Ioan Alexandrescu, Oradea; Referees: Jaume Teixido Bermudez (ESP), Gernot Haentschel (GER)
28 October 2025; 18:00	Report	Gusarov 4	Goals	Inaba, Vico 2	Bazinul Olimpic Ioan Alexandrescu, Oradea; Referees: Jaume Teixido Bermudez (ESP), Gernot Haentschel (GER)

28 October 2025; 19:00	Report	AN Brescia (Italy)	17–21	(Hungary) FTC-Telekom	Mompiano Swimming Center, Brescia; Referees: Ivan Rakovic (SRB), Peter de Jong (NED)
28 October 2025; 19:00	Report	Score by quarters: 2–5, 5–5, 6–7, 4–4			Mompiano Swimming Center, Brescia; Referees: Ivan Rakovic (SRB), Peter de Jong (NED)
28 October 2025; 19:00	Report	Dolce, Ferrero 4	Goals	Argyropoulos 7	Mompiano Swimming Center, Brescia; Referees: Ivan Rakovic (SRB), Peter de Jong (NED)

11 November 2025; 18:00	Report	CSM Oradea (Romania)	11–16	(Italy) AN Brescia	Bazinul Olimpic Ioan Alexandrescu, Oradea; Referees: Vojin Putnikovic (SRB), Tomislav Copic (CRO)
11 November 2025; 18:00	Report	Score by quarters: 3–6, 1–4, 2–4, 5–2			Bazinul Olimpic Ioan Alexandrescu, Oradea; Referees: Vojin Putnikovic (SRB), Tomislav Copic (CRO)
11 November 2025; 18:00	Report	Gardašević 6	Goals	Ferrero 3	Bazinul Olimpic Ioan Alexandrescu, Oradea; Referees: Vojin Putnikovic (SRB), Tomislav Copic (CRO)

12 November 2025; 20:30	Report	FTC-Telekom (Hungary)	26–15	(Montenegro) Primorac Kotor	Császár-Komjádi Béla Sport Swimming Pool, Budapest; Referees: Georgios Stavridis (GRE), Rik Evers (NED)
12 November 2025; 20:30	Report	Score by quarters: 7–6, 7–3, 4–3, 8–3			Császár-Komjádi Béla Sport Swimming Pool, Budapest; Referees: Georgios Stavridis (GRE), Rik Evers (NED)
12 November 2025; 20:30	Report	Argyropoulos 5	Goals	Mrsic 7	Császár-Komjádi Béla Sport Swimming Pool, Budapest; Referees: Georgios Stavridis (GRE), Rik Evers (NED)

18 November 2025; 18:30	Report	CSM Oradea (Romania)	5–17	(Hungary) FTC-Telekom	Bazinul Olimpic Ioan Alexandrescu, Oradea; Referees: Andrej Franulović (CRO), Hendrik Schopp (GER)
18 November 2025; 18:30	Report	Score by quarters: 1–1, 3–3, 0–6, 1–7			Bazinul Olimpic Ioan Alexandrescu, Oradea; Referees: Andrej Franulović (CRO), Hendrik Schopp (GER)
18 November 2025; 18:30	Report	five players 1	Goals	Vigvári 4	Bazinul Olimpic Ioan Alexandrescu, Oradea; Referees: Andrej Franulović (CRO), Hendrik Schopp (GER)

18 November 2025; 20:30	Report	AN Brescia (Italy)	19–16	(Montenegro) Primorac Kotor	Mompiano Swimming Center, Brescia; Referees: Pau Segurana Ferre (ESP), Konstantinos Vasileiou (GRE)
18 November 2025; 20:30	Report	Score by quarters: 4–2, 7–7, 4–4, 4–3			Mompiano Swimming Center, Brescia; Referees: Pau Segurana Ferre (ESP), Konstantinos Vasileiou (GRE)
18 November 2025; 20:30	Report	four players 3	Goals	Mrsic 4	Mompiano Swimming Center, Brescia; Referees: Pau Segurana Ferre (ESP), Konstantinos Vasileiou (GRE)

2 December 2025; 18:30	Report	Primorac Kotor (Montenegro)	15–11	(Romania) CSM Oradea	Nikša Bućin Swimming Pool, Kotor; Referees: Peter De Jong (NED), Spyridon Achladiotis (GRE)
2 December 2025; 18:30	Report	Score by quarters: 4–2, 3–3, 3–2, 5–4			Nikša Bućin Swimming Pool, Kotor; Referees: Peter De Jong (NED), Spyridon Achladiotis (GRE)
2 December 2025; 18:30	Report	Mrsic 4	Goals	Gardašević 5	Nikša Bućin Swimming Pool, Kotor; Referees: Peter De Jong (NED), Spyridon Achladiotis (GRE)

2 December 2025; 20:30	Report	FTC-Telekom (Hungary)	13–16 (PSO)	(Italy) AN Brescia	Császár-Komjádi Béla Sport Swimming Pool, Budapest; Referees: Sebastien Dervieux (FRA), Vuk Milovic (SRB)
2 December 2025; 20:30	Report	Score by quarters: 1–0, 5–8, 3–2, 3–2 PSO: 1–4			Császár-Komjádi Béla Sport Swimming Pool, Budapest; Referees: Sebastien Dervieux (FRA), Vuk Milovic (SRB)
2 December 2025; 20:30	Report	Manhercz 3	Goals	Popadić 3	Császár-Komjádi Béla Sport Swimming Pool, Budapest; Referees: Sebastien Dervieux (FRA), Vuk Milovic (SRB)

11 February 2026; 19:00	Report	AN Brescia (Italy)	17–13	(Romania) CSM Oradea	Mompiano Swimming Center, Brescia; Referees: Diana Dumas-Dutilh (NED), Ivan Rakovic (SRB)
11 February 2026; 19:00	Report	Score by quarters: 5–3, 4–3, 3–4, 5–3			Mompiano Swimming Center, Brescia; Referees: Diana Dumas-Dutilh (NED), Ivan Rakovic (SRB)
11 February 2026; 19:00	Report	Guerrato 5	Goals	Gardašević 5	Mompiano Swimming Center, Brescia; Referees: Diana Dumas-Dutilh (NED), Ivan Rakovic (SRB)

11 February 2026; 19:00	Report	Primorac Kotor (Montenegro)	15–25	(Hungary) FTC-Telekom	Nikša Bućin Swimming Pool, Kotor; Referees: Marta Cabanas Pegado (ESP), Matan Schwartz (ISR)
11 February 2026; 19:00	Report	Score by quarters: 3–5, 4–9, 6–5, 2–6			Nikša Bućin Swimming Pool, Kotor; Referees: Marta Cabanas Pegado (ESP), Matan Schwartz (ISR)
11 February 2026; 19:00	Report	Stanojević 4	Goals	Argyropoulos 5	Nikša Bućin Swimming Pool, Kotor; Referees: Marta Cabanas Pegado (ESP), Matan Schwartz (ISR)

=== Group D ===
Pos	Team	Pld	W	PSW	PSL	L	GF	GA	GD	Pts	Qualification	ZOD	HAN	SAB	MAR
1	(Spain) Zodiac Atlètic-Barceloneta	6	5	0	0	1	99	65	+34	15	Advance to Quarter-finals round	—	20–12	13–7	11–12
2	(Germany) Waspo'98 Hannover	6	3	0	0	3	73	103	−30	9	Advance to Quarter-finals round	11–27	—	16–14	14–13
3	(Spain) KEIO CN Sabadell	6	2	0	0	4	70	80	−10	6	Transfer to Euro Cup	12–16	9–11	—	16–13
4	(France) CN Marseille	6	2	0	0	4	80	74	+6	6	Transfer to Euro Cup	11–12	20–9	11–12	—

Source: European Aquatics Champions League

14 October 2025; 20:30	Report	CN Marseille (France)	20–9	(Germany) Waspo'98 Hannover	Pierre Garsau Pool, Marseille; Referees: Ivan Rakovic (SRB), Sinisa Matijasevic (MNE)
14 October 2025; 20:30	Report	Score by quarters: 6–3, 5–3, 5–2, 4–1			Pierre Garsau Pool, Marseille; Referees: Ivan Rakovic (SRB), Sinisa Matijasevic (MNE)
14 October 2025; 20:30	Report	Bouet 5	Goals	three players 2	Pierre Garsau Pool, Marseille; Referees: Ivan Rakovic (SRB), Sinisa Matijasevic (MNE)

15 October 2025; 20:30	Report	KEIO CN Sabadell (Spain)	12–16	(Spain) Zodiac Atlètic-Barceloneta	Can Llong pool, Sabadell; Referees: Michiel Zwart (NED), Vojin Putnikovic (SRB)
15 October 2025; 20:30	Report	Score by quarters: 2–3, 5–4, 2–6, 3–3			Can Llong pool, Sabadell; Referees: Michiel Zwart (NED), Vojin Putnikovic (SRB)
15 October 2025; 20:30	Report	Averka 5	Goals	Sanahuja, Velotto 3	Can Llong pool, Sabadell; Referees: Michiel Zwart (NED), Vojin Putnikovic (SRB)

29 October 2025; 18:30	Report	Waspo'98 Hannover (Germany)	16–14	(Spain) KEIO CN Sabadell	Stadionbad, Hanover; Referees: Georgios Stavridis (GRE), Tamás Kovács-Csatlós (HUN)
29 October 2025; 18:30	Report	Score by quarters: 3–6, 3–2, 4–3, 6–3			Stadionbad, Hanover; Referees: Georgios Stavridis (GRE), Tamás Kovács-Csatlós (HUN)
29 October 2025; 18:30	Report	Strelezkij 4	Goals	Panerai 7	Stadionbad, Hanover; Referees: Georgios Stavridis (GRE), Tamás Kovács-Csatlós (HUN)

28 October 2025; 19:00	Report	Zodiac Atlètic-Barceloneta (Spain)	11–12	(France) CN Marseille	Piscina Sant Sebastià, Barcelona; Referees: Andrej Franulović (CRO), Alessandro Severo (ITA)
28 October 2025; 19:00	Report	Score by quarters: 2–3, 2–2, 2–4, 5–3			Piscina Sant Sebastià, Barcelona; Referees: Andrej Franulović (CRO), Alessandro Severo (ITA)
28 October 2025; 19:00	Report	Munárriz 4	Goals	Nagy 5	Piscina Sant Sebastià, Barcelona; Referees: Andrej Franulović (CRO), Alessandro Severo (ITA)

12 November 2025; 18:30	Report	Waspo'98 Hannover (Germany)	11–27	(Spain) Zodiac Atlètic-Barceloneta	Stadionbad, Hanover; Referees: Gyorgy Kun (HUN), Veselin Miskovic (MNE)
12 November 2025; 18:30	Report	Score by quarters: 3–6, 4–7, 2–9, 2–5			Stadionbad, Hanover; Referees: Gyorgy Kun (HUN), Veselin Miskovic (MNE)
12 November 2025; 18:30	Report	Gansen 3	Goals	Vigvári 7	Stadionbad, Hanover; Referees: Gyorgy Kun (HUN), Veselin Miskovic (MNE)

12 November 2025; 20:30	Report	CN Marseille (France)	11–12	(Spain) KEIO CN Sabadell	Pierre Garsau Pool, Marseille; Referees: Spyridon Achladiotis (GRE), Raffaele Colombo (ITA)
12 November 2025; 20:30	Report	Score by quarters: 3–3, 4–5, 1–2, 3–2			Pierre Garsau Pool, Marseille; Referees: Spyridon Achladiotis (GRE), Raffaele Colombo (ITA)
12 November 2025; 20:30	Report	Nagy, Vernoux 3	Goals	Averka, Vergara Real 3	Pierre Garsau Pool, Marseille; Referees: Spyridon Achladiotis (GRE), Raffaele Colombo (ITA)

18 November 2025; 20:30	Report	Waspo'98 Hannover (Germany)	14–13	(France) CN Marseille	Stadionbad, Hanover; Referees: Boris Margeta (SLO), Norbert Ercse (HUN)
18 November 2025; 20:30	Report	Score by quarters: 2–3, 3–2, 6–4, 3–4			Stadionbad, Hanover; Referees: Boris Margeta (SLO), Norbert Ercse (HUN)
18 November 2025; 20:30	Report	Schipper 3	Goals	Nagy 5	Stadionbad, Hanover; Referees: Boris Margeta (SLO), Norbert Ercse (HUN)

18 November 2025; 19:00	Report	Zodiac Atlètic-Barceloneta (Spain)	13–7	(Spain) KEIO CN Sabadell	Piscina Sant Sebastià, Barcelona; Referees: Ivan Rakovic (SRB), Sinisa Matijasevic (MNE)
18 November 2025; 19:00	Report	Score by quarters: 2–2, 3–2, 5–1, 3–2			Piscina Sant Sebastià, Barcelona; Referees: Ivan Rakovic (SRB), Sinisa Matijasevic (MNE)
18 November 2025; 19:00	Report	Tahull, Vigvári 3	Goals	Barroso Macarro, Panerai 2	Piscina Sant Sebastià, Barcelona; Referees: Ivan Rakovic (SRB), Sinisa Matijasevic (MNE)

2 December 2025; 20:30	Report	CN Marseille (France)	11–12	(Spain) Zodiac Atlètic-Barceloneta	Pierre Garsau Pool, Marseille; Referees: Tamás Kovács-Csatlós (HUN), Matan Schwartz (ISR)
2 December 2025; 20:30	Report	Score by quarters: 4–1, 4–4, 2–3, 1–4			Pierre Garsau Pool, Marseille; Referees: Tamás Kovács-Csatlós (HUN), Matan Schwartz (ISR)
2 December 2025; 20:30	Report	Bouet 4	Goals	Echenique, Vigvári 3	Pierre Garsau Pool, Marseille; Referees: Tamás Kovács-Csatlós (HUN), Matan Schwartz (ISR)

3 December 2025; 18:30	Report	KEIO CN Sabadell (Spain)	9–11	(Germany) Waspo'98 Hannover	Can Llong pool, Sabadell; Referees: Jakov Blaskovic (CRO), Massimo Calabro (ITA)
3 December 2025; 18:30	Report	Score by quarters: 5–3, 1–2, 1–3, 2–3			Can Llong pool, Sabadell; Referees: Jakov Blaskovic (CRO), Massimo Calabro (ITA)
3 December 2025; 18:30	Report	three players 2	Goals	Vukičević 3	Can Llong pool, Sabadell; Referees: Jakov Blaskovic (CRO), Massimo Calabro (ITA)

11 February 2026; 19:00	Report	Zodiac Atlètic-Barceloneta (Spain)	20–12	(Germany) Waspo'98 Hannover	Piscina Sant Sebastià, Barcelona; Referees: Raffaele Colombo (ITA), Andrej Franulović (CRO)
11 February 2026; 19:00	Report	Score by quarters: 4–1, 5–1, 6–6, 5–4			Piscina Sant Sebastià, Barcelona; Referees: Raffaele Colombo (ITA), Andrej Franulović (CRO)
11 February 2026; 19:00	Report	four players 3	Goals	Vukičević 3	Piscina Sant Sebastià, Barcelona; Referees: Raffaele Colombo (ITA), Andrej Franulović (CRO)

11 February 2026; 20:00	Report	KEIO CN Sabadell (Spain)	16–13	(France) CN Marseille	Can Llong pool, Sabadell; Referees: Veselin Miskovic (MNE), Gyorgy Kun (HUN)
11 February 2026; 20:00	Report	Score by quarters: 5–2, 3–4, 6–3, 2–4			Can Llong pool, Sabadell; Referees: Veselin Miskovic (MNE), Gyorgy Kun (HUN)
11 February 2026; 20:00	Report	Cabanas, Panerai 3	Goals	Vernoux 6	Can Llong pool, Sabadell; Referees: Veselin Miskovic (MNE), Gyorgy Kun (HUN)

== See also ==
- 2025–26 European Aquatics Champions League
- 2025–26 European Aquatics Euro Cup
- 2025–26 European Aquatics Conference Cup
- 2025–26 European Aquatics Challenger Cup
- 2025 European Aquatics Super Cup
- 2025–26 European Aquatics Women's Champions League
- 2025–26 European Aquatics Women's Euro Cup
- 2025–26 European Aquatics Women's Conference Cup
- 2025–26 European Aquatics Women's Challenger Cup
- 2025 European Aquatics Women's Super Cup

Reference
Matchday 1
Matchday 2
Matchday 3
Matchday 4
Matchday 5
Matchday 6

Reference
Matchday 1
Matchday 1
Matchday 2
Matchday 2
Matchday 3
Matchday 3
Matchday 4
Matchday 4
Matchday 5
Matchday 5
Matchday 6
