= 2025–26 European Aquatics Champions League quarter-finals round =

Tournament information
- Sport: Water polo
- Date: 3 March – 20 May 2026
- Teams: 8
- Website: Official website

The 2025–26 European Aquatics Champions League quarter-finals round is played between 3 March and 20 May 2026 to determine the four teams advancing to the Final Four of the 2025–26 European Aquatics Champions League.

== Format ==
The four group winners and four group runners-up were drawn into two groups, with each one containing two group winners and two group runners-up. In each group, teams will play against each other home-and-away in a round-robin format. The top two teams in each group advanced to the Final Four.

Teams are ranked according to points (3 points for a win, 2 points for a penalty shootout win, 1 point for a penalty shootout loss, 0 points for a loss), and if tied on points, the following tiebreaking criteria are applied, in the order given, to determine the rankings:

- Points in head-to-head matches among tied teams;
- Goal difference in head-to-head matches among tied teams;
- Goals scored in head-to-head matches among tied teams;
- Goal difference in all group matches;
- Goals scored in all group matches.

== Draw ==
External videos
- 2025–26 European Aquatics Champions League quarter-finals round – Draw
- Draw

The draw took place in Zagreb on 16 February. The seeded and unseeded clubs consist of the teams that finished first and second in the previous round respectively. The only restriction was that clubs from the same group in the Main round could not be drawn against each other.

Teams are ranked according to points (3 points for a win, 2 points for a penalty shootout win, 1 point for a penalty shootout loss, 0 points for a loss), and if tied on points, the following tiebreaking criteria are applied, in the order given, to determine the rankings:

- Points in head-to-head matches among tied teams;
- Goal difference in head-to-head matches among tied teams;
- Goals scored in head-to-head matches among tied teams;
- Goal difference in all group matches;
- Goals scored in all group matches.

Key to colours
Group winners and runners-up advance to Final Four

Seeded Team (Greece) Olympiacos SF Piraeus (Italy) Pro Recco (Hungary) FTC-Telekom (Spain) Zodiac Atlètic-Barceloneta	Unseeded Team (Croatia) HAVK Mladost Zagreb (Serbia) Novi Beograd Tehnomanija (Italy) AN Brescia (Germany) Waspo'98 Hannover

== Groups ==
=== Group A ===
Pos	Team	Pld	W	PSW	PSL	L	GF	GA	GD	Pts	Qualification	ZOD	OLY	BRE	NOV
1	(Spain) Zodiac Atlètic-Barceloneta	6	6	0	0	0	97	69	+28	18	Final Four	—	20–13	17–6	19–16
2	(Greece) Olympiacos Piraeus	6	2	1	0	3	73	81	−8	8	Final Four	9–12	—	14–11	16–15
3	(Italy) AN Brescia	6	2	0	1	3	69	83	−14	7		11–13	16–17 (Note: Match ended 11–11. Olympiacos Piraeus won 6–5 on penalties.)	—	12–11
4	(Serbia) Novi Beograd Tehnomanija	6	1	0	0	5	85	91	−6	3		14–16	12–10	17–18	—

Source: European Aquatics Champions League

3 March 2026; 20:30	Report	AN Brescia (Italy)	11–13	(Spain) Zodiac Atlètic-Barceloneta	Mompiano Swimming Center, Brescia; Referees: Frank Ohme (GER), Jakov Blaskovic (CRO)
3 March 2026; 20:30	Report	Score by quarters: 3–4, 2–5, 2–2, 4–2			Mompiano Swimming Center, Brescia; Referees: Frank Ohme (GER), Jakov Blaskovic (CRO)
3 March 2026; 20:30	Report	Del Basso 3	Goals	Sanahuja 3	Mompiano Swimming Center, Brescia; Referees: Frank Ohme (GER), Jakov Blaskovic (CRO)

3 March 2026; 20:30	Report	Novi Beograd Tehnomanija (Serbia)	12–10	(Greece) Olympiacos Piraeus	11th April Sports and Recreation Center, Belgrade; Referees: Tamás Kovács-Csatlós (HUN), Julien Bourges (FRA)
3 March 2026; 20:30	Report	Score by quarters: 4–2, 3–2, 1–4, 4–2			11th April Sports and Recreation Center, Belgrade; Referees: Tamás Kovács-Csatlós (HUN), Julien Bourges (FRA)
3 March 2026; 20:30	Report	Lukić 4	Goals	Zalánki 6	11th April Sports and Recreation Center, Belgrade; Referees: Tamás Kovács-Csatlós (HUN), Julien Bourges (FRA)

24 March 2026; 18:30	Report	Olympiacos Piraeus (Greece)	14–11	(Italy) AN Brescia	Papastrateio "Petros Kapagerof" Pool, Piraeus; Referees: Boris Margeta (SLO), Stanko Ivanovski (MNE)
24 March 2026; 18:30	Report	Score by quarters: 2–2, 5–2, 3–4, 4–3			Papastrateio "Petros Kapagerof" Pool, Piraeus; Referees: Boris Margeta (SLO), Stanko Ivanovski (MNE)
24 March 2026; 18:30	Report	three players 3	Goals	three players 2	Papastrateio "Petros Kapagerof" Pool, Piraeus; Referees: Boris Margeta (SLO), Stanko Ivanovski (MNE)

24 March 2026; 20:30	Report	Zodiac Atlètic-Barceloneta (Spain)	19–16	(Serbia) Novi Beograd Tehnomanija	Piscina Sant Sebastià, Barcelona; Referees: Michiel Zwart (NED), Frank Ohme (GER)
24 March 2026; 20:30	Report	Score by quarters: 6–6, 4–3, 4–4, 5–3			Piscina Sant Sebastià, Barcelona; Referees: Michiel Zwart (NED), Frank Ohme (GER)
24 March 2026; 20:30	Report	Sanahuja 6	Goals	Gladovic 4	Piscina Sant Sebastià, Barcelona; Referees: Michiel Zwart (NED), Frank Ohme (GER)

31 March 2026; 20:30	Report	Zodiac Atlètic-Barceloneta (Spain)	20–13	(Greece) Olympiacos Piraeus	Piscina Sant Sebastià, Barcelona; Referees: Andrej Franulovic (CRO), Norbert Ercse (HUN)
31 March 2026; 20:30	Report	Score by quarters: 4–4, 6–4, 5–3, 5–2			Piscina Sant Sebastià, Barcelona; Referees: Andrej Franulovic (CRO), Norbert Ercse (HUN)
31 March 2026; 20:30	Report	Vigvári 7	Goals	Dimou 5	Piscina Sant Sebastià, Barcelona; Referees: Andrej Franulovic (CRO), Norbert Ercse (HUN)

31 March 2026; 20:30	Report	AN Brescia (Italy)	12–11	(Serbia) Novi Beograd Tehnomanija	Mompiano Swimming Center, Brescia; Referees: Gyorgy Kun (HUN), Julien Bourges (FRA)
31 March 2026; 20:30	Report	Score by quarters: 3–1, 3–3, 4–4, 2–3			Mompiano Swimming Center, Brescia; Referees: Gyorgy Kun (HUN), Julien Bourges (FRA)
31 March 2026; 20:30	Report	Ferrero 3	Goals	Martinović 4	Mompiano Swimming Center, Brescia; Referees: Gyorgy Kun (HUN), Julien Bourges (FRA)

22 April 2026; 20:30	Report	Olympiacos Piraeus (Greece)	16–15	(Serbia) Novi Beograd Tehnomanija	Papastrateio "Petros Kapagerof" Pool, Piraeus; Referees: Margeta (SLO), Kovacs-Csatlos (HUN)
22 April 2026; 20:30	Report	Score by quarters: 6–3, 3–4, 4–5, 3–3			Papastrateio "Petros Kapagerof" Pool, Piraeus; Referees: Margeta (SLO), Kovacs-Csatlos (HUN)
22 April 2026; 20:30	Report	three players 3	Goals	Martinović, Lukić 4	Papastrateio "Petros Kapagerof" Pool, Piraeus; Referees: Margeta (SLO), Kovacs-Csatlos (HUN)

22 April 2026; 20:30	Report	Zodiac Atlètic-Barceloneta (Spain)	17–6	(Italy) AN Brescia	Piscina Sant Sebastià, Barcelona; Referees: Franulovic (CRO), Matijasevic (MNE)
22 April 2026; 20:30	Report	Score by quarters: 5–2, 3–0, 4–2, 5–2			Piscina Sant Sebastià, Barcelona; Referees: Franulovic (CRO), Matijasevic (MNE)
22 April 2026; 20:30	Report	Vigvári 5	Goals	Dolce 3	Piscina Sant Sebastià, Barcelona; Referees: Franulovic (CRO), Matijasevic (MNE)

13 May 2026; 20:30	Report	AN Brescia (Italy)	16–17 (PSO)	(Greece) Olympiacos Piraeus	Mompiano Swimming Center, Brescia; Referees: Julien Bourges (FRA), Jakov Blaskovic (CRO)
13 May 2026; 20:30	Report	Score by quarters: 2–2, 4–4, 2–4, 3–1 PSO: 5–6			Mompiano Swimming Center, Brescia; Referees: Julien Bourges (FRA), Jakov Blaskovic (CRO)
13 May 2026; 20:30	Report	Balzarini 4	Goals	Genidounias 3	Mompiano Swimming Center, Brescia; Referees: Julien Bourges (FRA), Jakov Blaskovic (CRO)

13 May 2026; 20:30	Report	Novi Beograd Tehnomanija (Serbia)	14–16	(Spain) Zodiac Atlètic-Barceloneta	11th April Sports and Recreation Center, Belgrade; Referees: Frank Ohme (GER), Sebastien Dervieux (FRA)
13 May 2026; 20:30	Report	Score by quarters: 2–3, 3–3, 4–4, 5–6			11th April Sports and Recreation Center, Belgrade; Referees: Frank Ohme (GER), Sebastien Dervieux (FRA)
13 May 2026; 20:30	Report	Martinović 5	Goals	Sanahuja, Vigvári 4	11th April Sports and Recreation Center, Belgrade; Referees: Frank Ohme (GER), Sebastien Dervieux (FRA)

20 May 2026; 21:30	Report	Olympiacos Piraeus (Greece)	9–12	(Spain) Zodiac Atlètic-Barceloneta	Papastrateio "Petros Kapagerof" Pool, Piraeus; Referees: Maro Savinovic (CRO), Stanko Ivanovski (MNE)
20 May 2026; 21:30	Report	Score by quarters: 1–3, 3–3, 2–4, 3–2			Papastrateio "Petros Kapagerof" Pool, Piraeus; Referees: Maro Savinovic (CRO), Stanko Ivanovski (MNE)
20 May 2026; 21:30	Report	Genidounias 3	Goals	Vigvári 3	Papastrateio "Petros Kapagerof" Pool, Piraeus; Referees: Maro Savinovic (CRO), Stanko Ivanovski (MNE)

20 May 2026; 20:30	Report	Novi Beograd Tehnomanija (Serbia)	17–18	(Italy) AN Brescia	11th April Sports and Recreation Center, Belgrade; Referees: Matan Chwartz (ISR), Hendrik Schopp (GER)
20 May 2026; 20:30	Report	Score by quarters: 6–4, 5–4, 3–5, 3–5			11th April Sports and Recreation Center, Belgrade; Referees: Matan Chwartz (ISR), Hendrik Schopp (GER)
20 May 2026; 20:30	Report	Martinović 6	Goals	Del Basso 5	11th April Sports and Recreation Center, Belgrade; Referees: Matan Chwartz (ISR), Hendrik Schopp (GER)

=== Group B ===
Pos	Team	Pld	W	PSW	PSL	L	GF	GA	GD	Pts	Qualification	PRO	FTC	MLA	HAN
1	(Italy) Pro Recco	6	5	0	0	1	96	72	+24	15 (Note: Pro Recco 27–25 FTC-Telekom)	Final Four	—	14–16	13–10	19–9
2	(Hungary) FTC-Telekom	6	5	0	0	1	94	68	+26	15	Final Four	9–13	—	16–10	17–8
3	(Croatia) HAVK Mladost Zagreb	6	1	0	0	5	70	84	−14	3 (Note: HAVK Mladost Zagreb 26–23 Waspo'98 Hannover)		14–17	10–15	—	12–8
4	(Germany) Waspo'98 Hannover	6	1	0	0	5	67	103	−36	3		14–20	13–21	15–14	—

Source: European Aquatics Champions League
Notes:

4 March 2026; 20:30	Report	FTC-Telekom (Hungary)	9–13	(Italy) Pro Recco	Császár-Komjádi Béla Sport Swimming Pool, Budapest; Referees: Boris Margeta (SLO), Francesc Xavier Buch Juanola (ESP),
4 March 2026; 20:30	Report	Score by quarters: 0–5, 3–2, 3–3, 3–3			Császár-Komjádi Béla Sport Swimming Pool, Budapest; Referees: Boris Margeta (SLO), Francesc Xavier Buch Juanola (ESP),
4 March 2026; 20:30	Report	three players 2	Goals	Di Fulvio, Granados 3	Császár-Komjádi Béla Sport Swimming Pool, Budapest; Referees: Boris Margeta (SLO), Francesc Xavier Buch Juanola (ESP),

4 March 2026; 20:30	Report	HAVK Mladost Zagreb (Croatia)	12–8	(Germany) Waspo'98 Hannover	Bazen Mladost, Zagreb; Referees: Georgios Stavridis (GRE), Mihai Balanescu (ROU)
4 March 2026; 20:30	Report	Score by quarters: 5–0, 2–2, 3–3, 2–3			Bazen Mladost, Zagreb; Referees: Georgios Stavridis (GRE), Mihai Balanescu (ROU)
4 March 2026; 20:30	Report	Bukić, Radulović 2	Goals	four players 2	Bazen Mladost, Zagreb; Referees: Georgios Stavridis (GRE), Mihai Balanescu (ROU)

25 March 2026; 20:30	Report	Waspo'98 Hannover (Germany)	13–21	(Hungary) FTC-Telekom	Stadionbad, Hanover; Referees: Vojin Putnikovic (SRB), Alex Marquez Mas (ESP)
25 March 2026; 20:30	Report	Score by quarters: 3–5, 3–5, 3–6, 4–5			Stadionbad, Hanover; Referees: Vojin Putnikovic (SRB), Alex Marquez Mas (ESP)
25 March 2026; 20:30	Report	Strelezkij 4	Goals	Nagy 4	Stadionbad, Hanover; Referees: Vojin Putnikovic (SRB), Alex Marquez Mas (ESP)

25 March 2026; 20:30	Report	Pro Recco (Italy)	13–10	(Croatia) HAVK Mladost Zagreb	Municipal Swimming Pool, Sori; Referees: Julien Bourges (FRA), Spyridon Achladiotis (GRE)
25 March 2026; 20:30	Report	Score by quarters: 5–2, 2–0, 4–5, 2–3			Municipal Swimming Pool, Sori; Referees: Julien Bourges (FRA), Spyridon Achladiotis (GRE)
25 March 2026; 20:30	Report	five players 2	Goals	Kharkov 5	Municipal Swimming Pool, Sori; Referees: Julien Bourges (FRA), Spyridon Achladiotis (GRE)

1 April 2026; 20:30	Report	Waspo'98 Hannover (Germany)	14–20	(Italy) Pro Recco	Stadionbad, Hanover; Referees: David Gomez Pordomingo (ESP), Ivan Rakovic (SRB)
1 April 2026; 20:30	Report	Score by quarters: 2–3, 6–7, 2–5, 4–5			Stadionbad, Hanover; Referees: David Gomez Pordomingo (ESP), Ivan Rakovic (SRB)
1 April 2026; 20:30	Report	Vukičević 5	Goals	Gratta 6	Stadionbad, Hanover; Referees: David Gomez Pordomingo (ESP), Ivan Rakovic (SRB)

1 April 2026; 20:30	Report	HAVK Mladost Zagreb (Croatia)	10–15	(Hungary) FTC-Telekom	Bazen Mladost, Zagreb; Referees: Boris Margeta (SLO), Peter De Jong (NED)
1 April 2026; 20:30	Report	Score by quarters: 1–5, 3–5, 6–3, 0–2			Bazen Mladost, Zagreb; Referees: Boris Margeta (SLO), Peter De Jong (NED)
1 April 2026; 20:30	Report	Radulović 3	Goals	Argyropoulos 4	Bazen Mladost, Zagreb; Referees: Boris Margeta (SLO), Peter De Jong (NED)

21 April 2026; 20:30	Report	Pro Recco (Italy)	14–16	(Hungary) FTC-Telekom	Municipal Swimming Pool, Sori; Referees: Stavridis (GRE), Gomez Pordomingo (ESP)
21 April 2026; 20:30	Report	Score by quarters: 4–6, 0–4, 6–3, 4–3			Municipal Swimming Pool, Sori; Referees: Stavridis (GRE), Gomez Pordomingo (ESP)
21 April 2026; 20:30	Report	Di Fulvio 5	Goals	Manhercz 5	Municipal Swimming Pool, Sori; Referees: Stavridis (GRE), Gomez Pordomingo (ESP)

21 April 2026; 20:30	Report	Waspo'98 Hannover (Germany)	15–14	(Croatia) HAVK Mladost Zagreb	Stadionbad, Hanover; Referees: Buch Juanola (ESP), Bourdramis (GRE)
21 April 2026; 20:30	Report	Score by quarters: 2–3, 3–4, 6–5, 4–2			Stadionbad, Hanover; Referees: Buch Juanola (ESP), Bourdramis (GRE)
21 April 2026; 20:30	Report	seven players 2	Goals	Vrlić 3	Stadionbad, Hanover; Referees: Buch Juanola (ESP), Bourdramis (GRE)

12 May 2026; 20:30	Report	FTC-Telekom (Hungary)	17–8	(Germany) Waspo'98 Hannover	Császár-Komjádi Béla Sport Swimming Pool, Budapest; Referees: Matan Schwartz (ISR), Ivan Rakovic (SRB)
12 May 2026; 20:30	Report	Score by quarters: 4–0, 4–3, 4–2, 5–3			Császár-Komjádi Béla Sport Swimming Pool, Budapest; Referees: Matan Schwartz (ISR), Ivan Rakovic (SRB)
12 May 2026; 20:30	Report	Vigvári 4	Goals	Lozina, Vukičević 2	Császár-Komjádi Béla Sport Swimming Pool, Budapest; Referees: Matan Schwartz (ISR), Ivan Rakovic (SRB)

12 May 2026; 20:30	Report	HAVK Mladost Zagreb (Croatia)	14–17	(Italy) Pro Recco	Bazen Mladost, Zagreb; Referees: Konstantinos Vasileiou (GRE), Pau Segurana Ferre (ESP)
12 May 2026; 20:30	Report	Score by quarters: 3–5, 4–4, 3–4, 4–4			Bazen Mladost, Zagreb; Referees: Konstantinos Vasileiou (GRE), Pau Segurana Ferre (ESP)
12 May 2026; 20:30	Report	Kharkov 4	Goals	three players 3	Bazen Mladost, Zagreb; Referees: Konstantinos Vasileiou (GRE), Pau Segurana Ferre (ESP)

20 May 2026; 20:30	Report	Pro Recco (Italy)	19–9	(Germany) Waspo'98 Hannover	Municipal Swimming Pool, Sori; Referees: Sinisa Matijasevic (MNE), Peter De Jong (NED)
20 May 2026; 20:30	Report	Score by quarters: 4–3, 3–0, 6–2, 6–4			Municipal Swimming Pool, Sori; Referees: Sinisa Matijasevic (MNE), Peter De Jong (NED)
20 May 2026; 20:30	Report	Di Fulvio	Goals	Gansen, Vukičević 3	Municipal Swimming Pool, Sori; Referees: Sinisa Matijasevic (MNE), Peter De Jong (NED)

20 May 2026; 20:30	Report	FTC-Telekom (Hungary)	16–10	(Croatia) HAVK Mladost Zagreb	Császár-Komjádi Béla Sport Swimming Pool, Budapest; Referees: Boris Margeta (SLO), Mihai Balanescu (ROU)
20 May 2026; 20:30	Report	Score by quarters: 5–3, 3–3, 5–1, 3–3			Császár-Komjádi Béla Sport Swimming Pool, Budapest; Referees: Boris Margeta (SLO), Mihai Balanescu (ROU)
20 May 2026; 20:30	Report	Manhercz, Vigvári 3	Goals	ten players 1	Császár-Komjádi Béla Sport Swimming Pool, Budapest; Referees: Boris Margeta (SLO), Mihai Balanescu (ROU)

== See also ==
- 2025–26 European Aquatics Champions League
- 2025–26 European Aquatics Euro Cup
- 2025–26 European Aquatics Conference Cup
- 2025–26 European Aquatics Challenger Cup
- 2025 European Aquatics Super Cup
- 2025–26 European Aquatics Women's Champions League
- 2025–26 European Aquatics Women's Euro Cup
- 2025–26 European Aquatics Women's Conference Cup
- 2025–26 European Aquatics Women's Challenger Cup
- 2025 European Aquatics Women's Super Cup

Reference
Matchday 1
Matchday 2
Matchday 3
Matchday 4
Matchday 5
Matchday 6

Reference
Matchday 1
Matchday 1
Matchday 2
Matchday 2
Matchday 3
Matchday 3
Matchday 4
Matchday 4
Matchday 5
Matchday 5
Matchday 6
