= 2025–26 European Aquatics Champions League main round =

Tournament information
- Sport: Water polo
- Date: 14 October – 11 December 2025
- Teams: 16
- Website: Official website

Tournament statistics
- Matches played: 48

The 2025–26 European Aquatics Champions League main round is played between 14 October and 11 December 2025 to determine the eight teams advancing to the Quarter-finals round of the 2025–26 European Aquatics Champions League.

== Format ==
The 16 teams were place into four groups of four. In each group, teams will play against each other home-and-away in a round-robin format. The top two teams in each group advanced to the Quarter-finals round.

Teams are ranked according to points (3 points for a win, 2 points for a penalty shootout win, 1 point for a penalty shootout loss, 0 points for a loss), and if tied on points, the following tiebreaking criteria are applied, in the order given, to determine the rankings:

- Points in head-to-head matches among tied teams;
- Goal difference in head-to-head matches among tied teams;
- Goals scored in head-to-head matches among tied teams;
- Goal difference in all group matches;
- Goals scored in all group matches.

== Draw ==
External videos
- Draw

The draw was on 28 July 2025 in Zagreb, Croatia. The seeding is based on the club rankings. The only restriction was that clubs from the same country could not be drawn against each other. The six teams from the qualifiers were not known at the time of the draw.

Key to colours
Group winners and runners-up advance to Quarter-finals round

Pot 1
Team	Rank	Points
(Hungary) FTC-Telekom	1	40,502.5
(Italy) Pro Recco	3	36,000
(Spain) Zodiac Atlètic-Barceloneta	4	32,985
(Greece) Olympiacos SFP	5	30,137.5

Pot 2
Team	Rank	Points
(France) CN Marseille	6	26,877.5
(Croatia) Jadran Split	8	21,285
(Serbia) Radnički Kragujevac	14	12,240
(Romania) CSM Oradea	15	11,627.5

Pot 3
Team	Rank	Points
(Germany) Waspo'98 Hannover	21	10,282.5
(Montenegro) Jadran m:tel Herceg Novi	22	9,442.5
(N/A) Team (Note: Team not known at the time of the draw. Was the Group A winner in qualification.)	24	10,165
(N/A) Team (Note: Team not known at the time of the draw. Was the Group B winner in qualification.)	28	7,145

Pot 4
Team	Rank	Points
(N/A) Team (Note: Team not known at the time of the draw. Was the Group C winner in qualification.)	27	7,832.5
(N/A) Team (Note: Team not known at the time of the draw. Was the Group A runners up in qualification.)	22	10,565
(N/A) Team (Note: Team not known at the time of the draw. Was the Group B runners up in qualification.)	30	6,812.5
(N/A) Team (Note: Team not known at the time of the draw. Was the Group C runners up in qualification.)	10	18,740

== See also ==
- 2025–26 European Aquatics Champions League
- 2025–26 European Aquatics Euro Cup
- 2025–26 European Aquatics Conference Cup
- 2025–26 European Aquatics Challenger Cup
- 2025 European Aquatics Super Cup
- 2025–26 European Aquatics Women's Champions League
- 2025–26 European Aquatics Women's Euro Cup
- 2025–26 European Aquatics Women's Conference Cup
- 2025–26 European Aquatics Women's Challenger Cup
- 2025 European Aquatics Women's Super Cup
