= Water polo at the 2026 Mediterranean Games =

Water polo competition

Tournament details
- Host country: Italy
- Venue: 1 (in 1 host city)
- Dates: 28 August – 3 September
- Teams: 9 (from 1 confederation)

Final positions
- Champions: Italy (7th title)
- Runners-up: Montenegro
- Third place: Serbia
- Fourth place: Spain

Tournament statistics
- Matches played: 24
- Goals scored: 692 (28.83 per match)
- Top scorers: (Italy) Filippo Ferrero (Spain) Pol Daura (23 goals)

The water polo tournament at the 2026 Mediterranean Games in Taranto took place between 28 August and 3 September at the Torre d'Ayala Swimming Stadium in Taranto.

The competition was held only for men's teams.

== Medal summary ==
=== Events ===
Event	Gold	Silver	Bronze
Men	Italy; Francesco De Michelis; Francesco Lorenzo Cassia; Andrea Mladossich; Tomas Alfonso Pozo; Davide Occhione; Andrea Patchaliev; Filippo Ferrero; Alessandro Gullotta; Matteo Iocchi Gratta; Andrea Condemi; Francesco Condemi; Alessandro Carnesecchi; Luca Izzo; Alessandro Balzarini	Montenegro; Darko Đurović; Jovan Vujović; Đuro Radović; Danilo Stupar; Aljoša Mačić; Dušan Banićević; Aleksa Ukropina; Balša Vučković; Matija Sladović; Vladan Spaić; Dušan Matković; Vasilije Radović; Ilija Radović; Strahinja Gojković	Serbia; Vladimir Mišović; Luka Pljevančić; Nemanja Stanojević; Viktor Urošević; Dušan Trtović; Vuk Milojević; Đorđe Vučinić; Marko Dimitrijević; Zoran Bozović; Vasilije Martinović; Nikola Lukić; Bogdan Gavrilović; Milan Glušac; Vuk Čonkić

== Participating teams ==
- Bosnia and Herzegovina
- France
- Greece
- Italy
- Montenegro
- Serbia
- Slovenia
- Spain
- Turkey

== Preliminary round ==
All times are local (UTC+2).

=== Group A ===
Pos	Team	Pld	W	PSW	PSL	L	GF	GA	GD	Pts	Qualification
1	Montenegro	3	3	0	0	0	53	32	+21	9	Semifinals
2	Serbia	3	2	0	0	1	60	20	+40	6	Semifinals
3	Greece	3	1	0	0	2	41	40	+1	3	5–8th place semifinals
4	Slovenia	3	0	0	0	3	15	77	−62	0	5–8th place semifinals

Source: Taranto 2026
Rules for classification: 1) Points; 2) Head-to-head points; 3) Head-to-head goal difference; 4) Head-to-head goals scored; 5) Goal difference; 6) Goals scored; 7) Draw.

28 August 2026; 16:00	Report	Slovenia	1–32	Serbia	Torre D'Ayala Stadium, Taranto; Referees: Gregory Courbin (FRA), Cihan Büyükburç (TUR)
28 August 2026; 16:00	Report	Score by quarters: 0–7, 0–7, 1–9, 0–9			Torre D'Ayala Stadium, Taranto; Referees: Gregory Courbin (FRA), Cihan Büyükburç (TUR)
28 August 2026; 16:00	Report	Potočnik 1	Goals	Urošević, Dimitrijević 5	Torre D'Ayala Stadium, Taranto; Referees: Gregory Courbin (FRA), Cihan Büyükburç (TUR)

28 August 2026; 17:30	Report	Montenegro	16–14	Greece	Torre D'Ayala Stadium, Taranto; Referees: Maxim Gerasimov (GBR), Marco Ercoli (ITA)
28 August 2026; 17:30	Report	Score by quarters: 4–3, 5–2, 3–4, 4–5			Torre D'Ayala Stadium, Taranto; Referees: Maxim Gerasimov (GBR), Marco Ercoli (ITA)
28 August 2026; 17:30	Report	Banićević 4	Goals	Pouros 6	Torre D'Ayala Stadium, Taranto; Referees: Maxim Gerasimov (GBR), Marco Ercoli (ITA)

30 August 2026; 16:00	Report	Slovenia	9–22	Greece	Torre D'Ayala Stadium, Taranto; Referees: Cihan Büyükburç (TUR), Neven Špoljarić (BIH)
30 August 2026; 16:00	Report	Score by quarters: 2–4, 2–6, 1–4, 4–8			Torre D'Ayala Stadium, Taranto; Referees: Cihan Büyükburç (TUR), Neven Špoljarić (BIH)
30 August 2026; 16:00	Report	Potočnik 3	Goals	Bitsakos 5	Torre D'Ayala Stadium, Taranto; Referees: Cihan Büyükburç (TUR), Neven Špoljarić (BIH)

30 August 2026; 17:30	Report	Serbia	13–14	Montenegro	Torre D'Ayala Stadium, Taranto; Referees: Maxim Gerasimov (GBR), Alex Marquez Mas (ESP)
30 August 2026; 17:30	Report	Score by quarters: 3–3, 4–4, 4–3, 2–4			Torre D'Ayala Stadium, Taranto; Referees: Maxim Gerasimov (GBR), Alex Marquez Mas (ESP)
30 August 2026; 17:30	Report	Martinović 4	Goals	Gojković 4	Torre D'Ayala Stadium, Taranto; Referees: Maxim Gerasimov (GBR), Alex Marquez Mas (ESP)

1 September 2026; 16:00	Report	Montenegro	23–5	Slovenia	Torre D'Ayala Stadium, Taranto; Referees: Neven Špoljarić (BIH), Gregory Courbin (FRA)
1 September 2026; 16:00	Report	Score by quarters: 6–2, 8–0, 5–2, 4–1			Torre D'Ayala Stadium, Taranto; Referees: Neven Špoljarić (BIH), Gregory Courbin (FRA)
1 September 2026; 16:00	Report	three players 4	Goals	Potočnik 3	Torre D'Ayala Stadium, Taranto; Referees: Neven Špoljarić (BIH), Gregory Courbin (FRA)

1 September 2026; 17:30	Report	Greece	5–15	Serbia	Torre D'Ayala Stadium, Taranto; Referees: Tamás Kovács-Csatlós (HUN), Rok Vehovec (SLO)
1 September 2026; 17:30	Report	Score by quarters: 2–5, 1–4, 1–3, 1–3			Torre D'Ayala Stadium, Taranto; Referees: Tamás Kovács-Csatlós (HUN), Rok Vehovec (SLO)
1 September 2026; 17:30	Report	Pouros 3	Goals	Martinović 5	Torre D'Ayala Stadium, Taranto; Referees: Tamás Kovács-Csatlós (HUN), Rok Vehovec (SLO)

=== Group B ===
Pos	Team	Pld	W	PSW	PSL	L	GF	GA	GD	Pts	Qualification
1	Italy (H)	4	4	0	0	0	92	30	+62	12	Semifinals
2	Spain	4	3	0	0	1	77	36	+41	9	Semifinals
3	France	4	2	0	0	2	64	46	+18	6	5–8th place semifinals
4	Turkey	4	1	0	0	3	50	64	−14	3	5–8th place semifinals
5	Bosnia and Herzegovina	4	0	0	0	4	22	129	−107	0	

Source: Taranto 2026
Rules for classification: 1) Points; 2) Head-to-head points; 3) Head-to-head goal difference; 4) Head-to-head goals scored; 5) Goal difference; 6) Goals scored; 7) Draw.
(H) Host

28 August 2026; 19:00	Report	Italy	38–4	Bosnia and Herzegovina	Torre D'Ayala Stadium, Taranto; Referees: Rastko Prlić (SRB), Rok Vehovec (SLO)
28 August 2026; 19:00	Report	Score by quarters: 10–1, 9–0, 9–1, 10–2			Torre D'Ayala Stadium, Taranto; Referees: Rastko Prlić (SRB), Rok Vehovec (SLO)
28 August 2026; 19:00	Report	Cassia 8	Goals	four players 4	Torre D'Ayala Stadium, Taranto; Referees: Rastko Prlić (SRB), Rok Vehovec (SLO)

28 August 2026; 20:30	Report	Turkey	9–15	Spain	Torre D'Ayala Stadium, Taranto; Referees: Spyridon Achladiotis (GRE), Stanko Ivanovski (MNE)
28 August 2026; 20:30	Report	Score by quarters: 1–3, 3–4, 3–5, 2–3			Torre D'Ayala Stadium, Taranto; Referees: Spyridon Achladiotis (GRE), Stanko Ivanovski (MNE)
28 August 2026; 20:30	Report	Alpman, Caner 2	Goals	Valls 5	Torre D'Ayala Stadium, Taranto; Referees: Spyridon Achladiotis (GRE), Stanko Ivanovski (MNE)

29 August 2026; 17:30	Report	France	35–4	Bosnia and Herzegovina	Torre D'Ayala Stadium, Taranto; Referees: Stanko Ivanovski (MNE), Rok Vehovec (SLO)
29 August 2026; 17:30	Report	Score by quarters: 9–0, 9–0, 7–0, 10–4			Torre D'Ayala Stadium, Taranto; Referees: Stanko Ivanovski (MNE), Rok Vehovec (SLO)
29 August 2026; 17:30	Report	Guerin 7	Goals	four players 1	Torre D'Ayala Stadium, Taranto; Referees: Stanko Ivanovski (MNE), Rok Vehovec (SLO)

29 August 2026; 19:00	Report	Turkey	7–25	Italy	Torre D'Ayala Stadium, Taranto; Referees: Tamás Kovács-Csatlós (HUN), Rastko Prlić (SRB)
29 August 2026; 19:00	Report	Score by quarters: 1–6, 1–6, 2–6, 3–7			Torre D'Ayala Stadium, Taranto; Referees: Tamás Kovács-Csatlós (HUN), Rastko Prlić (SRB)
29 August 2026; 19:00	Report	Düzenli 3	Goals	Alfonso 5	Torre D'Ayala Stadium, Taranto; Referees: Tamás Kovács-Csatlós (HUN), Rastko Prlić (SRB)

30 August 2026; 19:00	Report	Italy	15–6	France	Torre D'Ayala Stadium, Taranto; Referees: Tamás Kovács-Csatlós (HUN), Stanko Ivanovski (MNE)
30 August 2026; 19:00	Report	Score by quarters: 2–1, 7–2, 2–0, 2–2			Torre D'Ayala Stadium, Taranto; Referees: Tamás Kovács-Csatlós (HUN), Stanko Ivanovski (MNE)
30 August 2026; 19:00	Report	Ferrero, Iocchi Gratta 3	Goals	Nardon 2	Torre D'Ayala Stadium, Taranto; Referees: Tamás Kovács-Csatlós (HUN), Stanko Ivanovski (MNE)

30 August 2026; 20:30	Report	Bosnia and Herzegovina	3–33	Spain	Torre D'Ayala Stadium, Taranto; Referees: Spyridon Achladiotis (GRE), Rastko Prlić (SRB)
30 August 2026; 20:30	Report	Score by quarters: 1–7, 0–11, 0–7, 2–8			Torre D'Ayala Stadium, Taranto; Referees: Spyridon Achladiotis (GRE), Rastko Prlić (SRB)
30 August 2026; 20:30	Report	three players 1	Goals	three players 5	Torre D'Ayala Stadium, Taranto; Referees: Spyridon Achladiotis (GRE), Rastko Prlić (SRB)

31 August 2026; 17:30	Report	Spain	16–10	France	Torre D'Ayala Stadium, Taranto; Referees: Maxim Gerasimov (GBR), Rok Vehovec (SLO)
31 August 2026; 17:30	Report	Score by quarters: 5–3, 6–3, 3–0, 2–4			Torre D'Ayala Stadium, Taranto; Referees: Maxim Gerasimov (GBR), Rok Vehovec (SLO)
31 August 2026; 17:30	Report	Daura, Valls 4	Goals	four players 2	Torre D'Ayala Stadium, Taranto; Referees: Maxim Gerasimov (GBR), Rok Vehovec (SLO)

31 August 2026; 19:00	Report	Bosnia and Herzegovina	11–23	Turkey	Torre D'Ayala Stadium, Taranto; Referees: Marco Ercoli (ITA), Stanko Ivanovski (MNE)
31 August 2026; 19:00	Report	Score by quarters: 2–5, 6–7, 2–5, 1–6			Torre D'Ayala Stadium, Taranto; Referees: Marco Ercoli (ITA), Stanko Ivanovski (MNE)
31 August 2026; 19:00	Report	Krmek 6	Goals	three players 4	Torre D'Ayala Stadium, Taranto; Referees: Marco Ercoli (ITA), Stanko Ivanovski (MNE)

1 September 2026; 19:00	Report	Italy	14–13	Spain	Torre D'Ayala Stadium, Taranto; Referees: Maxim Gerasimov (GBR), Cihan Büyükburç (TUR)
1 September 2026; 19:00	Report	Score by quarters: 3–3, 4–5, 3–2, 4–3			Torre D'Ayala Stadium, Taranto; Referees: Maxim Gerasimov (GBR), Cihan Büyükburç (TUR)
1 September 2026; 19:00	Report	Ferrero 7	Goals	Valls 4	Torre D'Ayala Stadium, Taranto; Referees: Maxim Gerasimov (GBR), Cihan Büyükburç (TUR)

1 September 2026; 20:30	Report	France	13–11	Turkey	Torre D'Ayala Stadium, Taranto; Referees: Spyridon Achladiotis (GRE), Alex Marquez Mas (ESP)
1 September 2026; 20:30	Report	Score by quarters: 3–0, 4–4, 4–4, 2–3			Torre D'Ayala Stadium, Taranto; Referees: Spyridon Achladiotis (GRE), Alex Marquez Mas (ESP)
1 September 2026; 20:30	Report	Marion-Vernoux 3	Goals	Acar 3	Torre D'Ayala Stadium, Taranto; Referees: Spyridon Achladiotis (GRE), Alex Marquez Mas (ESP)

== Classification round ==
=== Bracket ===
5–8th place semifinals
2 September
Greece	21
Turkey	12
2 September
France	24
Slovenia	9

Fifth place game
3 September
Greece	12
France	14
Seventh place game
3 September
Turkey	15
Slovenia	9

=== 5–8th place semifinals ===
2 September 2026; 13:00	Report	Greece	21–12	Turkey	Torre D'Ayala Stadium, Taranto; Referees: Alex Marquez Mas (ESP), Neven Špoljarić (BIH)
2 September 2026; 13:00	Report	Score by quarters: 4–3, 9–4, 5–5, 3–0			Torre D'Ayala Stadium, Taranto; Referees: Alex Marquez Mas (ESP), Neven Špoljarić (BIH)
2 September 2026; 13:00	Report	Spachits 6	Goals	Acar, Kahraman 3	Torre D'Ayala Stadium, Taranto; Referees: Alex Marquez Mas (ESP), Neven Špoljarić (BIH)

2 September 2026; 14:30	Report	France	24–9	Slovenia	Torre D'Ayala Stadium, Taranto; Referees: Rastko Prlic (SRB), Marco Ercoli (ITA)
2 September 2026; 14:30	Report	Score by quarters: 6–2, 6–3, 5–0, 7–4			Torre D'Ayala Stadium, Taranto; Referees: Rastko Prlic (SRB), Marco Ercoli (ITA)
2 September 2026; 14:30	Report	Bouet, Do Carmo 5	Goals	Potočnik 4	Torre D'Ayala Stadium, Taranto; Referees: Rastko Prlic (SRB), Marco Ercoli (ITA)

=== Seventh place game ===
3 September 2026; 9:00	Report	Turkey	15–9	Slovenia	Torre D'Ayala Stadium, Taranto; Referees: Stanko Ivanovski (MNE), Alex Marquez Mas (ESP)
3 September 2026; 9:00	Report	Score by quarters: 4–1, 4–2, 2–3, 5–3			Torre D'Ayala Stadium, Taranto; Referees: Stanko Ivanovski (MNE), Alex Marquez Mas (ESP)
3 September 2026; 9:00	Report	Düzenli 4	Goals	Potočnik 4	Torre D'Ayala Stadium, Taranto; Referees: Stanko Ivanovski (MNE), Alex Marquez Mas (ESP)

=== Fifth place game ===
3 September 2026; 10:30	Report	Greece	12–14	France	Torre D'Ayala Stadium, Taranto; Referees: Rastko Prlić (SRB), Neven Špoljarić (BIH)
3 September 2026; 10:30	Report	Score by quarters: 0–4, 6–5, 2–3, 4–2			Torre D'Ayala Stadium, Taranto; Referees: Rastko Prlić (SRB), Neven Špoljarić (BIH)
3 September 2026; 10:30	Report	Giannatos 3	Goals	Bouet, Mas 3	Torre D'Ayala Stadium, Taranto; Referees: Rastko Prlić (SRB), Neven Špoljarić (BIH)

== Final round ==
=== Bracket ===
Semifinals
2 September
Montenegro	15
Spain	14
2 September
Italy	11
Serbia	10

Gold medal game
3 September
Montenegro	14
Italy	18
Bronze medal game
3 September
Spain	8
Serbia	12

=== Semifinals ===
2 September 2026; 16:00	Report	Montenegro	15–14	Spain	Torre D'Ayala Stadium, Taranto; Referees: Tamas Kovacs Csatlos (HUN), Rok Vehovec (SLO)
2 September 2026; 16:00	Report	Score by quarters: 2–3, 7–2, 4–3, 2–6			Torre D'Ayala Stadium, Taranto; Referees: Tamas Kovacs Csatlos (HUN), Rok Vehovec (SLO)
2 September 2026; 16:00	Report	Gojković, Đ. Radović 4	Goals	Daura 7	Torre D'Ayala Stadium, Taranto; Referees: Tamas Kovacs Csatlos (HUN), Rok Vehovec (SLO)

2 September 2026; 17:30	Report	Italy	11–10	Serbia	Torre D'Ayala Stadium, Taranto; Referees: Maxim Gerasimov (GBR), Spyridon Achladiotis (GRE)
2 September 2026; 17:30	Report	Score by quarters: 3–1, 2–6, 3–0, 3–3			Torre D'Ayala Stadium, Taranto; Referees: Maxim Gerasimov (GBR), Spyridon Achladiotis (GRE)
2 September 2026; 17:30	Report	Ferrero 4	Goals	Urošević 4	Torre D'Ayala Stadium, Taranto; Referees: Maxim Gerasimov (GBR), Spyridon Achladiotis (GRE)

=== Bronze medal game ===
3 September 2026; 12:00	Report	Spain	8–12	Serbia	Torre D'Ayala Stadium, Taranto; Referees: Marco Ercoli (ITA), Maxim Gerasimov (GBR)
3 September 2026; 12:00	Report	Score by quarters: 2–5, 3–3, 2–2, 1–2			Torre D'Ayala Stadium, Taranto; Referees: Marco Ercoli (ITA), Maxim Gerasimov (GBR)
3 September 2026; 12:00	Report	Daura 3	Goals	Martinović 6	Torre D'Ayala Stadium, Taranto; Referees: Marco Ercoli (ITA), Maxim Gerasimov (GBR)

=== Gold medal game ===
3 September 2026; 13:30	Report	Montenegro	14–18	Italy	Torre D'Ayala Stadium, Taranto; Referees: Tamás Kovács-Csatlós (HUN), Spyridon Achladiotis (GRE)
3 September 2026; 13:30	Report	Score by quarters: 4–5, 4–6, 3–3, 3–4			Torre D'Ayala Stadium, Taranto; Referees: Tamás Kovács-Csatlós (HUN), Spyridon Achladiotis (GRE)
3 September 2026; 13:30	Report	V. Radović 4	Goals	Mladossich 5	Torre D'Ayala Stadium, Taranto; Referees: Tamás Kovács-Csatlós (HUN), Spyridon Achladiotis (GRE)

== Final standings ==
Rank	Team
1st place, gold medalist(s)	Italy
2nd place, silver medalist(s)	Montenegro
3rd place, bronze medalist(s)	Serbia
4	Spain
5	France
6	Greece
7	Turkey
8	Slovenia
9	Bosnia and Herzegovina

== External link ==
- 2026 Mediterranean Games - Water polo
- Water polo schedule
- Results Book
