= 2025–26 European Aquatics Champions League =

Water polo sports season

European Aquatics Champions League
- 2025–26

Tournament information
- Sport: Water polo
- Date: Qualification round: 19–21 September 2025; Group stage: 14 October – 11 December 2025; Quarter-finals round: 3 March – 20 May 2026; Final Four: 11–13 June 2026
- Tournament format(s): Round Robin and Knockout stage
- Teams: Qualification round: 10 (Note: From 10 countries); Main round: 16 (Note: From 10 countries); Quarter-finals round: 8 Total: 20 (from 10 countries)
- Website: Official website

Final positions
- Champions: (Spain) Zodiac Atlètic-Barceloneta (2nd title)
- Runner-up: (Italy) Pro Recco

The 2025–26 European Aquatics Champions League was the 63rd edition of European Aquatics's premier competition for men's water polo clubs, and the 15th edition since being rebranded from the Euroleague to the Champions League. The season began on 19 September 2025 and ended on 13 June 2026 with the Final Four.

This was the third straight season under the new format, however, this season will witness a change in slot allocation, with only the top two from domestic leagues being allowed to take part.

The winners of the European Aquatics Champions League automatically qualified for next season's edition (if they choose to enter) and also qualified for the 2026 Super Cup.

FTC-Telekom were the defending champions.

Zodiac Atlètic-Barceloneta won their second title with a win over Pro Recco in the final.

== Format ==
- Qualification round

Ten teams participated in the qualification round in September 2025. The runners-up from national leagues ranked 1–10 and champions of the national leagues ranked 11–12 (if they choose to enter) took part. The teams were divided into three separate groups, held in centralised venues. After round robin play, the top two teams in each group progressed to the group stage.

- Group stage

Sixteen teams played in the group stage which was held between October 2025 to February 2026. The champions of national leagues ranked 1–10 plus the six clubs who advanced from the qualification round competed. The participants were distributed into four groups of four. After home and away double round robin play, the top two from each group qualified for the quarter-finals round while the bottom two dropped down to the 2025–26 European Aquatics Euro Cup knockout stage.

- Quarter-finals round

The eight advancing teams from the previous round were present and were split into two groups of four. The round was organised between March and May 2026. After home and away double round robin play, the top two from each group qualified for the Final Four.

- Final Four

In June 2026, the four remaining clubs traveled to Malta's capital, Valletta, to try and obtain the Champions League trophy. Two semifinals, a third place game and final took place to decide the champions.

== Rankings ==
The results were based on the results of the past four seasons.

- Associations 1–10 can have two teams ranked 1st and 2nd qualify.
- Associations 11–12 can have one team ranked 1st qualify.

| Rank | Association | Points | Teams |
|---|---|---|---|
| 1 | Italy | 99,917.5 | 2 |
| 2 | Hungary | 80,465 | 2 |
| 3 | Serbia | 71,510 | 2 |
| 4 | Spain | 69,187.5 | 2 |
| 5 | Greece | 59,917.5 | 2 |
| 6 | Croatia | 59,642.5 | 2 |
| 7 | France | 41,195 | 2 |
| 8 | Germany | 24,812.5 | 2 |
| 9 | Romania | 23,817.5 | 2 |
| 10 | Montenegro | 18,647.5 | 2 |
| 11 | (Georgia (country)) Georgia | 10,292.5 | 0 |
| 12 | Netherlands | 5,790 | 0 |
| 13 | Turkey | 5,722.5 | 0 |
| 14 | Portugal | 5,292.5 | 0 |
| 15 | Switzerland | 4,245 | 0 |

| Rank | Association | Points | Teams |
|---|---|---|---|
| 16 | Slovenia | 3,800 | 0 |
| 17 | Lithuania | 3,677.5 | 0 |
| 18 | Slovakia | 3,555 | 0 |
| 19 | (United Kingdom) Great Britain | 2,280 | 0 |
| 20 | Belgium | 2,170 | 0 |
| 21 | Israel | 1,850 | 0 |
| 22 | Cyprus | 1,490 | 0 |
| 23 | Malta | 1,472 | 0 |
| 24 | Finland | 1,420 | 0 |
| 25 | Bosnia and Herzegovina | 1,190 | 0 |
| 26 | Russia | 1,087.5 | 0 |
| 27 | Bulgaria | 370 | 0 |
| 28 | Poland | 317.5 | 0 |
| 29 | Denmark | 280 | 0 |

=== Ranking facts ===
Biggest rise
| Pos | Team | Ori | New | Move |
|---|---|---|---|---|
| 1 | Cyprus | 28 | 22 | ▲ +6 |
| 2 | Portugal | 17 | 14 | ▲ +3 |
| 2 | Israel | 24 | 21 | ▲ +3 |

Biggest fall
| Pos | Team | Ori | New | Move |
|---|---|---|---|---|
| 1 | Russia | 13 | 26 | ▼ –13 |
| 2 | Bosnia and Herzegovina | 20 | 25 | ▼ –5 |
| 3 | Denmark | 25 | 29 | ▼ –4 |

New entries
None

Leaving entries
None

== Teams ==
Starting this season, only the champions and runners-up teams from national leagues ranked 1–10 and champions from national leagues ranked 11–12 are permitted to enter. Starting this season, champions from countries ranked below the top 12 are not permitted to enter.

The Champions League and, for the first time, Euro Cup winners are granted a place in the Champions League group stage and qualification round respectively (however, both spots was not used as both clubs in question qualified via winning their domestic league).

Unlike last season, in the event that a club decides not to enter, the third place team is not allowed to take their place.

=== Qualified teams ===
The labels in the parentheses show how each team qualified for the place of its starting round:

- CL: Champions League title holders
- EC: Euro Cup title holders
- 1st, 2nd,: League positions of the previous season

| Entry round | Teams | | | |
|---|---|---|---|---|
| Main round | (Italy) Pro Recco ^{EC} (1st) | (Hungary) FTC-Telekom ^{CL} (1st) | (Spain) Zodiac Atlètic-Barceloneta (1st) | (Serbia) Radnički Kragujevac (1st) |
| Main round | (Greece) Olympiacos SF Piraeus (1st) | (Croatia) Jadran Split (1st) | (France) CN Marseille (1st) | (Germany) Waspo'98 Hannover (1st) |
| Main round | (Montenegro) Jadran m:tel Herceg Novi (1st) | (Romania) CSM Oradea (1st) | | |
| Qualification round | (Italy) AN Brescia (2nd) | (Hungary) Vasas SC (2nd) | (Spain) KEIO CN Sabadell (2nd) | (Serbia) Novi Beograd Tehnomanija (2nd) |
| Qualification round | (Greece) NO Vouliagmeni (2nd) | (Croatia) HAVK Mladost Zagreb (2nd) | (France) Pays d'Aix Natation (2nd) | (Germany) Spandau 04 (2nd) |
| Qualification round | (Romania) Steaua București (2nd) | (Montenegro) Primorac Kotor (2nd) | | |

==== Name changes ====
The following teams' names were changed during the season.

| Original name | New name | Matchday |
|---|---|---|
| (Serbia) Novi Beograd | (Serbia) Novi Beograd Tehnomanija | Matchday 6 (Group stage) |

== Round and draw dates ==
=== Schedule ===
| Phase | Round | Draw dates | Round date |
|---|---|---|---|
| Qualification round | All rounds | 28 July 2025 | 19–21 September 2025 |
| Group stage | Matchday 1 | 28 July 2025 | 14–15 October 2025 |
| Group stage | Matchday 2 | 28 July 2025 | 28–29 October 2025 |
| Group stage | Matchday 3 | 28 July 2025 | 11–12 November 2025 |
| Group stage | Matchday 4 | 28 July 2025 | 18–19 November 2025 |
| Group stage | Matchday 5 | 28 July 2025 | 2–3 December 2025 |
| Group stage | Matchday 6 | 28 July 2025 | 10–11 December 2025 |
| Quarter-finals round | Matchday 1 | 16 February 2026 | 3–4 March 2026 |
| Quarter-finals round | Matchday 2 | 16 February 2026 | 24–25 March 2026 |
| Quarter-finals round | Matchday 3 | 16 February 2026 | 31 March – 1 April 2026 |
| Quarter-finals round | Matchday 4 | 16 February 2026 | 21–22 April 2026 |
| Quarter-finals round | Matchday 5 | 16 February 2026 | 12–13 May 2026 |
| Quarter-finals round | Matchday 6 | 16 February 2026 | 19–20 May 2026 |
| Final Four | Semifinals | 16 February 2026 | 11 June 2026 |
| Final Four | Final | 16 February 2026 | 13 June 2026 |

== Qualification round ==
The group winners and runners-up qualify for the group stage, while everyone else drops down to the Euro Cup qualifiers. The draw was on 28 July 2025 in Zagreb, Croatia. The seeding is based on the club rankings.

=== Group A ===
19–21 September 2025, Belgrade, Serbia

| Pos | Team | Pld | W | PSW | PSL | L | GF | GA | GD | Pts | Qualification | KOT | NOV | STE | PAY |
|---|---|---|---|---|---|---|---|---|---|---|---|---|---|---|---|
| 1 | (Montenegro) Primorac Kotor | 3 | 2 | 1 | 0 | 0 | 45 | 33 | +12 | 8 | Group stage | — | — | 15–12 | 17–8 |
| 2 | (Serbia) Novi Beograd (H) | 3 | 2 | 0 | 1 | 0 | 56 | 29 | +27 | 7 | Group stage | 16–18 (Note: Match ended 13–13. Primorac Kotor won 5–3 on penalties.) | — | 20–6 | 23–10 |
| 3 | (Romania) Steaua București | 3 | 1 | 0 | 0 | 2 | 39 | 43 | −4 | 3 | | — | — | — | 21–8 |
| 4 | (France) Pays d'Aix Natation | 3 | 0 | 0 | 0 | 3 | 26 | 61 | −35 | 0 | | — | — | — | — |

Source: European Aquatics Champions League
(H) Host

=== Group B ===
19–21 September 2025, Sabadell, Spain

| Pos | Team | Pld | W | PSW | PSL | L | GF | GA | GD | Pts | Qualification | VAS | SAB | SPA |
|---|---|---|---|---|---|---|---|---|---|---|---|---|---|---|
| 1 | (Hungary) Vasas SC | 2 | 2 | 0 | 0 | 0 | 29 | 26 | +3 | 6 | Group stage | — | — | — |
| 2 | (Spain) KEIO CN Sabadell (H) | 2 | 1 | 0 | 0 | 1 | 22 | 23 | −1 | 3 | Group stage | 10–12 | — | 12–11 |
| 3 | (Germany) Spandau 04 | 2 | 0 | 0 | 0 | 2 | 27 | 29 | −2 | 0 | | 16–17 | — | — |

Source: European Aquatics Champions League
(H) Host

=== Group C ===
19–21 September 2025, Zagreb, Croatia

| Pos | Team | Pld | W | PSW | PSL | L | GF | GA | GD | Pts | Qualification | MLA | BRE | VOU |
|---|---|---|---|---|---|---|---|---|---|---|---|---|---|---|
| 1 | (Croatia) HAVK Mladost Zagreb (H) | 2 | 2 | 0 | 0 | 0 | 34 | 12 | +22 | 6 | Group stage | — | 18–8 | 16–4 |
| 2 | (Italy) AN Brescia | 2 | 1 | 0 | 0 | 1 | 23 | 31 | −8 | 3 | Group stage | — | — | — |
| 3 | (Greece) NO Vouliagmeni | 2 | 0 | 0 | 0 | 2 | 17 | 31 | −14 | 0 | | — | 13–15 | — |

Source: European Aquatics Champions League
(H) Host

== Group stage ==
Location of teams of the 2025–26 European Aquatics Champions League group stage.
Red: Group A; Blue: Group B; Yellow: Group C; Green: Group D

The top two from each group make the quarter-finals round. The bottom two from each group drops down to the Euro Cup eighth-finals.

Teams are ranked according to points (3 points for a win, 2 points for a penalty shootout win, 1 point for a penalty shootout loss, 0 points for a loss), and if tied on points, the following tiebreaking criteria are applied, in the order given, to determine the rankings:

- Points in head-to-head matches among tied teams;
- Goal difference in head-to-head matches among tied teams;
- Goals scored in head-to-head matches among tied teams;
- Goal difference in all group matches;
- Goals scored in all group matches.

This season, 13 of the 16 clubs from last season are present. HAVK Mladost Zagreb comes back after six years, while Italian sides, Pro Recco and AN Brescia return after a one edition absence.

Overall, a total of 10 countries are present in the group stage, down by one largely due to the restructuring of the European water polo competitions. Georgia are not present in the group stage for the first time since 2018–19.

=== Group A ===
| Pos | Team | Pld | W | PSW | PSL | L | GF | GA | GD | Pts | Qualification | OLY | MLA | RAD | VAS |
|---|---|---|---|---|---|---|---|---|---|---|---|---|---|---|---|
| 1 | (Greece) Olympiacos Piraeus | 6 | 4 | 1 | 0 | 1 | 85 | 59 | +26 | 14 | Advance to Quarter-finals round | — | 13–9 | 16–14 (Note: Match ended 11–11. Olympiacos Piraeus won 5–3 on penalties.) | 20–8 |
| 2 | (Croatia) HAVK Mladost Zagreb | 6 | 4 | 0 | 0 | 2 | 79 | 78 | +1 | 12 | Advance to Quarter-finals round | 14–13 | — | 17–15 | 15–13 |
| 3 | (Serbia) Radnički Kragujevac | 6 | 3 | 0 | 1 | 2 | 84 | 81 | +3 | 10 | Transfer to Euro Cup | 12–13 | 14–11 | — | 17–16 |
| 4 | (Hungary) Vasas SC | 6 | 0 | 0 | 0 | 6 | 65 | 95 | −30 | 0 | Transfer to Euro Cup | 5–15 | 10–13 | 13–15 | — |

Source: European Aquatics Champions League

=== Group B ===
| Pos | Team | Pld | W | PSW | PSL | L | GF | GA | GD | Pts | Qualification | PRO | NOV | HER | JAD |
|---|---|---|---|---|---|---|---|---|---|---|---|---|---|---|---|
| 1 | (Italy) Pro Recco | 6 | 6 | 0 | 0 | 0 | 90 | 59 | +31 | 18 | Advance to Quarter-finals round | — | 13–9 | 16–7 | 15–9 |
| 2 | (Serbia) Novi Beograd Tehnomanija (Note: Name was changed on matchday 6.) | 6 | 3 | 0 | 0 | 3 | 68 | 66 | +2 | 9 | Advance to Quarter-finals round | 8–12 | — | 11–12 | 15–10 |
| 3 | (Montenegro) Jadran m:tel Herceg Novi | 6 | 2 | 0 | 0 | 4 | 71 | 87 | −16 | 6 | Transfer to Euro Cup | 13–19 | 12–15 | — | 14–11 |
| 4 | (Croatia) Jadran Split | 6 | 1 | 0 | 0 | 5 | 65 | 82 | −17 | 3 | Transfer to Euro Cup | 13–15 | 7–10 | 15–13 | — |

Source: European Aquatics Champions League

=== Group C ===
| Pos | Team | Pld | W | PSW | PSL | L | GF | GA | GD | Pts | Qualification | FTC | BRE | ORA | KOT |
|---|---|---|---|---|---|---|---|---|---|---|---|---|---|---|---|
| 1 | (Hungary) FTC-Telekom | 6 | 5 | 0 | 1 | 0 | 120 | 75 | +45 | 16 | Advance to Quarter-finals round | — | 13–16 (Note: Match ended 12–12. AN Brescia won 4–1 on penalties.) | 19–11 | 26–15 |
| 2 | (Italy) AN Brescia | 6 | 4 | 1 | 0 | 1 | 95 | 86 | +9 | 14 | Advance to Quarter-finals round | 17–21 | — | – | 19–16 |
| 3 | (Romania) CSM Oradea | 6 | 1 | 0 | 0 | 5 | 65 | 91 | −26 | 3 (Note: CSM Oradea 25–22 Primorac Kotor) | Transfer to Euro Cup | 5–17 | 11–16 | — | 14–7 |
| 4 | (Montenegro) Primorac Kotor | 6 | 1 | 0 | 0 | 5 | 81 | 109 | −28 | 3 | Transfer to Euro Cup | 15–25 | 13–14 | 15–11 | — |

Source: European Aquatics Champions League

=== Group D ===
| Pos | Team | Pld | W | PSW | PSL | L | GF | GA | GD | Pts | Qualification | ZOD | HAN | SAB | MAR |
|---|---|---|---|---|---|---|---|---|---|---|---|---|---|---|---|
| 1 | (Spain) Zodiac Atlètic-Barceloneta | 6 | 5 | 0 | 0 | 1 | 99 | 65 | +34 | 15 | Advance to Quarter-finals round | — | 20–12 | 13–7 | 11–12 |
| 2 | (Germany) Waspo'98 Hannover | 6 | 3 | 0 | 0 | 3 | 73 | 103 | −30 | 9 | Advance to Quarter-finals round | 11–27 | — | 16–14 | 14–13 |
| 3 | (Spain) KEIO CN Sabadell | 6 | 2 | 0 | 0 | 4 | 70 | 80 | −10 | 6 | Transfer to Euro Cup | 12–16 | 9–11 | — | 16–13 |
| 4 | (France) CN Marseille | 6 | 2 | 0 | 0 | 4 | 80 | 74 | +6 | 6 | Transfer to Euro Cup | 11–12 | 20–9 | 11–12 | — |

Source: European Aquatics Champions League

== Quarter-finals round ==
The four group winners and four group runners-up were drawn into two groups, with each one containing two group winners and two group runners-up. The top two teams in each group advanced to the Final Four.

=== Draw ===
The draw took place in Zagreb on 16 February. The seeded and unseeded clubs consist of the teams that finished first and second in the previous round respectively. The only restriction was that clubs from the same group in the group stage could not be drawn against each other.

Teams are ranked according to points (3 points for a win, 2 points for a penalty shootout win, 1 point for a penalty shootout loss, 0 points for a loss), and if tied on points, the following tiebreaking criteria are applied, in the order given, to determine the rankings:

- Points in head-to-head matches among tied teams;
- Goal difference in head-to-head matches among tied teams;
- Goals scored in head-to-head matches among tied teams;
- Goal difference in all group matches;
- Goals scored in all group matches.

| Seeded | Unseeded |
|---|---|
| (Greece) Olympiacos SF Piraeus (Italy) Pro Recco (Hungary) FTC-Telekom (Spain) Zodiac Atlètic-Barceloneta | (Croatia) HAVK Mladost Zagreb (Serbia) Novi Beograd Tehnomanija (Italy) AN Brescia (Germany) Waspo'98 Hannover |

=== Group A ===
| Pos | Team | Pld | W | PSW | PSL | L | GF | GA | GD | Pts | Qualification | ZOD | OLY | BRE | NOV |
|---|---|---|---|---|---|---|---|---|---|---|---|---|---|---|---|
| 1 | (Spain) Zodiac Atlètic-Barceloneta | 6 | 6 | 0 | 0 | 0 | 97 | 69 | +28 | 18 | Final Four | — | 20–13 | 17–6 | 19–16 |
| 2 | (Greece) Olympiacos Piraeus | 6 | 2 | 1 | 0 | 3 | 73 | 81 | −8 | 8 | Final Four | 9–12 | — | 14–11 | 16–15 |
| 3 | (Italy) AN Brescia | 6 | 2 | 0 | 1 | 3 | 69 | 83 | −14 | 7 | | 11–13 | 16–17 (Note: Match ended 11–11. Olympiacos Piraeus won 6–5 on penalties.) | — | 12–11 |
| 4 | (Serbia) Novi Beograd Tehnomanija | 6 | 1 | 0 | 0 | 5 | 85 | 91 | −6 | 3 | | 14–16 | 12–10 | 17–18 | — |

Source: European Aquatics Champions League

=== Group B ===
| Pos | Team | Pld | W | PSW | PSL | L | GF | GA | GD | Pts | Qualification | PRO | FTC | MLA | HAN |
|---|---|---|---|---|---|---|---|---|---|---|---|---|---|---|---|
| 1 | (Italy) Pro Recco | 6 | 5 | 0 | 0 | 1 | 96 | 72 | +24 | 15 (Note: Pro Recco 27–25 FTC-Telekom) | Final Four | — | 14–16 | 13–10 | 19–9 |
| 2 | (Hungary) FTC-Telekom | 6 | 5 | 0 | 0 | 1 | 94 | 68 | +26 | 15 | Final Four | 9–13 | — | 16–10 | 17–8 |
| 3 | (Croatia) HAVK Mladost Zagreb | 6 | 1 | 0 | 0 | 5 | 70 | 84 | −14 | 3 (Note: HAVK Mladost Zagreb 26–23 Waspo'98 Hannover) | | 14–17 | 10–15 | — | 12–8 |
| 4 | (Germany) Waspo'98 Hannover | 6 | 1 | 0 | 0 | 5 | 67 | 103 | −36 | 3 | | 14–20 | 13–21 | 15–14 | — |

Source: European Aquatics Champions League

== Final Four ==
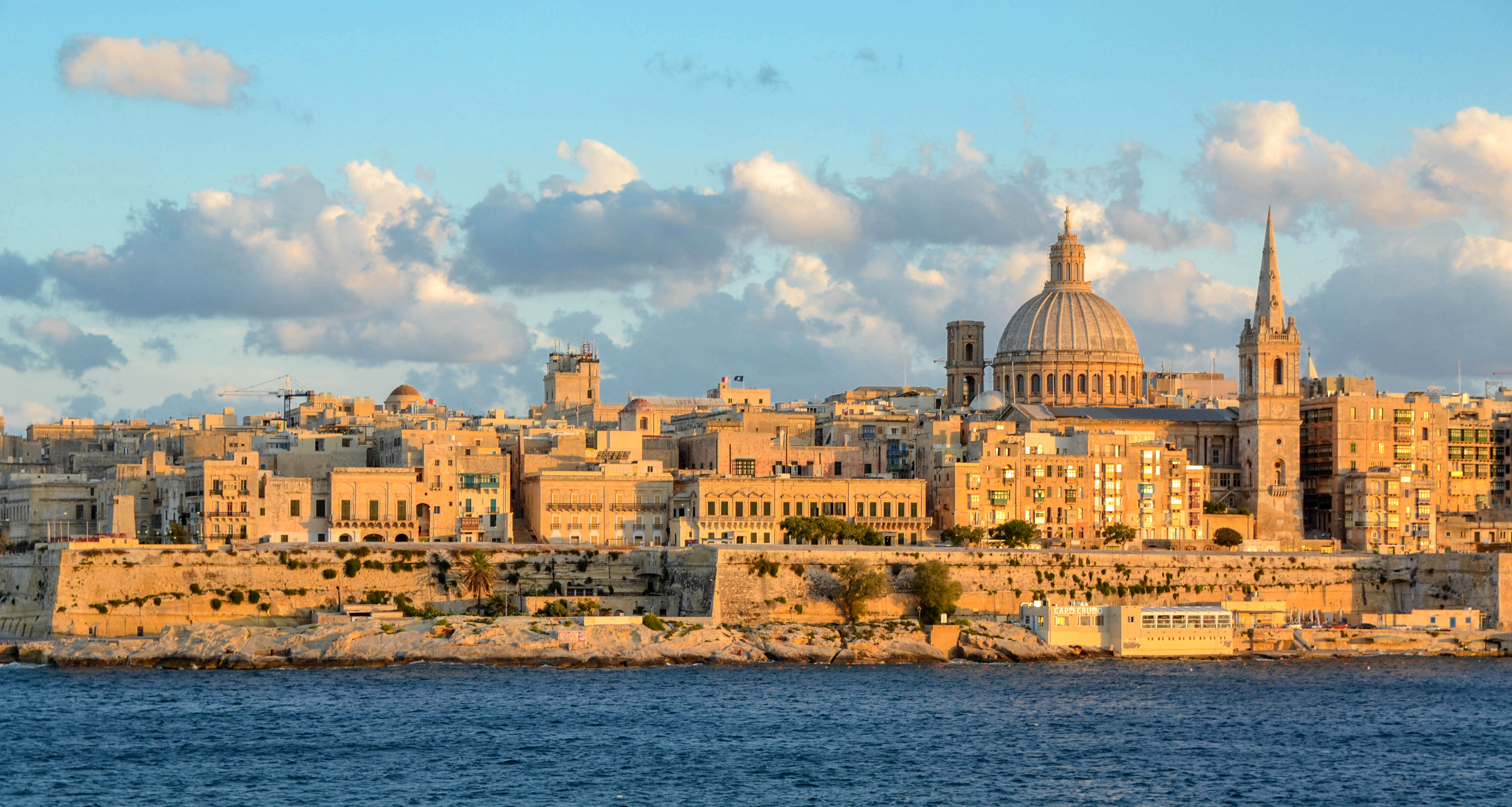
The National Pool Complex in Valletta will host the Final Four.

Once again the Final Four was held in Malta as part of the three-year deal signed in 2024. Although, it would held in conjunction with the women's Final Four this time round. The tournament was held on the 11–13 June 2026 at the National Pool Complex in Valletta, Malta.

=== Bracket ===
Semi-finals
(Spain) Zodiac Atlètic-Barceloneta | 13
(Hungary) FTC-Telekom | 11
(Italy) Pro Recco | 19
(Greece) Olympiacos Piraeus | 13

Final
(Spain) Zodiac Atlètic-Barceloneta | 17
(Italy) Pro Recco | 16
Third place
(Hungary) FTC-Telekom | 16
(Greece) Olympiacos Piraeus | 13

=== Third place match ===
| 13 June 2026; 19:00 | Report | FTC-Telekom (Hungary) | 16–13 | (Greece) Olympiacos Piraeus | National Pool Complex, Valletta; Referees: Raffaele Colombo (ITA), Frank Ohme (GER) |
| 13 June 2026; 19:00 | Report | Score by quarters: 5–4, 4–5, 2–2, 5–2 | | | National Pool Complex, Valletta; Referees: Raffaele Colombo (ITA), Frank Ohme (GER) |
| 13 June 2026; 19:00 | Report | Mandić, Vámos 3 | Goals | four players 2 | National Pool Complex, Valletta; Referees: Raffaele Colombo (ITA), Frank Ohme (GER) |

=== Final ===
| 13 June 2026; 21:00 | Report | Zodiac Atlètic-Barceloneta (Spain) | 17–16 | (Italy) Pro Recco | National Pool Complex, Valletta; Referees: Andrej Franulović (CRO), Julien Bourges (FRA) |
| 13 June 2026; 21:00 | Report | Score by quarters: 6–6, 5–6, 3–2, 3–2 | | | National Pool Complex, Valletta; Referees: Andrej Franulović (CRO), Julien Bourges (FRA) |
| 13 June 2026; 21:00 | Report | Burián, Biel 3 | Goals | Gratta, Condemi 3 | National Pool Complex, Valletta; Referees: Andrej Franulović (CRO), Julien Bourges (FRA) |

2025–26 European Aquatics Champions League Champions

Zodiac Atlètic-Barceloneta
2nd title

== See also ==
- 2025–26 European Aquatics Euro Cup
- 2025–26 European Aquatics Conference Cup
- 2025–26 European Aquatics Challenger Cup
- 2025 European Aquatics Super Cup
- 2025–26 European Aquatics Women's Champions League
- 2025–26 European Aquatics Women's Euro Cup
- 2025–26 European Aquatics Women's Conference Cup
- 2025–26 European Aquatics Women's Challenger Cup
- 2025 European Aquatics Women's Super Cup
