= 2025–26 European Aquatics Champions League qualification round =

- 2025–26

Tournament information
- Sport: Water polo
- Date: 19–21 September 2025
- Host(s): (Serbia) Belgrade (Spain) Sabadell (Croatia) Zagreb
- Teams: 10 (from 10 countries)
- Website: Official website

Tournament statistics
- Matches played: 12
- Goals scored: 318 (26.5 per match)

The 2025–26 European Aquatics Champions League qualification round is played between 19 and 21 September 2025 to determine the six teams advancing to the group stage of the 2025–26 European Aquatics Champions League.

== Format ==
The 10 teams were placed into three groups, two with three teams and one with four teams. In each group, teams will play against each other once in a round-robin format. The group winners and runners up will advance to the group stage.

Teams are ranked according to points (3 points for a win, 2 points for a penalty shootout win, 1 point for a penalty shootout loss, 0 points for a loss), and if tied on points, the following tiebreaking criteria are applied, in the order given, to determine the rankings:

- Points in head-to-head matches among tied teams;
- Goal difference in head-to-head matches among tied teams;
- Goals scored in head-to-head matches among tied teams;
- Goal difference in all group matches;
- Goals scored in all group matches.

== Draw ==
External videos
- 2025–26 European Aquatics Champions League qualification round – Draw
- Draw

The draw was on 28 July 2025 in Zagreb, Croatia. (H) indicates which clubs is hosting a group. The seeding is based on the club rankings.

Key to colours
Teams advancing to group stage

Pot 1
Team	Rank	Points
(Serbia) Novi Beograd (H)	2	37,935
(Italy) AN Brescia	7	21,942.5
(Spain) KEIO CN Sabadell (H)	10	19,127.5

Pot 2
Team	Rank	Points
(Hungary) Vasas SC	12	13,515
(Greece) NO Vouliagmeni	13	12,687.5
(Romania) Steaua București	16	11,480

Pot 3
Team	Rank	Points
(Germany) Spandau 04	19	10,400
(Croatia) HAVK Mladost Zagreb (H)	23	9,435
(Montenegro) Primorac Kotor	25	8,835
(France) Pays d'Aix Natation	70	820

== Groups ==
=== Group A ===
19–21 September 2025, Belgrade, Serbia

Pos	Team	Pld	W	PSW	PSL	L	GF	GA	GD	Pts	Qualification	KOT	NOV	STE	PAY
1	(Montenegro) Primorac Kotor	3	2	1	0	0	45	33	+12	8	Group stage	—	—	15–12	17–8
2	(Serbia) Novi Beograd (H)	3	2	0	1	0	56	29	+27	7	Group stage	16–18 (Note: Match ended 13–13. Primorac Kotor won 5–3 on penalties.)	—	20–6	23–10
3	(Romania) Steaua București	3	1	0	0	2	39	43	−4	3		—	—	—	21–8
4	(France) Pays d'Aix Natation	3	0	0	0	3	26	61	−35	0		—	—	—	—

Source: European Aquatics Champions League
(H) Host

19 September 2025; 18:45	Report	Novi Beograd (Serbia)	23–10	(France) Pays d'Aix Natation	11th April Sports and Recreation Center, Belgrade; Referees: Michiel Zwart (NED), Hendrik Schopp (GER)
19 September 2025; 18:45	Report	Score by quarters: 6–3, 5–0, 6–4, 6–3			11th April Sports and Recreation Center, Belgrade; Referees: Michiel Zwart (NED), Hendrik Schopp (GER)
19 September 2025; 18:45	Report	Martinovic 7	Goals	Beteille 3	11th April Sports and Recreation Center, Belgrade; Referees: Michiel Zwart (NED), Hendrik Schopp (GER)

19 September 2025; 20:45	Report	Primorac Kotor (Montenegro)	15–12	(Romania) Steaua București	11th April Sports and Recreation Center, Belgrade; Referees: David Pordomingo Gomez (ESP), Matan Schwartz (ISR)
19 September 2025; 20:45	Report	Score by quarters: 3–2, 7–4, 2–2, 3–4			11th April Sports and Recreation Center, Belgrade; Referees: David Pordomingo Gomez (ESP), Matan Schwartz (ISR)
19 September 2025; 20:45	Report	Inaba, Mršić 3	Goals	Vucinic 4	11th April Sports and Recreation Center, Belgrade; Referees: David Pordomingo Gomez (ESP), Matan Schwartz (ISR)

20 September 2025; 17:30	Report	Primorac Kotor (Montenegro)	17–8	(France) Pays d'Aix Natation	11th April Sports and Recreation Center, Belgrade; Referees: Hendrik Schopp (GER), David Pordomingo Gomez (ESP)
20 September 2025; 17:30	Report	Score by quarters: 5–2, 3–1, 3–3, 6–2			11th April Sports and Recreation Center, Belgrade; Referees: Hendrik Schopp (GER), David Pordomingo Gomez (ESP)
20 September 2025; 17:30	Report	three players 3	Goals	Beteille 4	11th April Sports and Recreation Center, Belgrade; Referees: Hendrik Schopp (GER), David Pordomingo Gomez (ESP)

20 September 2025; 19:30	Report	Novi Beograd (Serbia)	20–6	(Romania) Steaua București	11th April Sports and Recreation Center, Belgrade; Referees: Michiel Zwart (NED), Matan Schwartz (ISR)
20 September 2025; 19:30	Report	Score by quarters: 7–0, 3–2, 5–2, 5–2			11th April Sports and Recreation Center, Belgrade; Referees: Michiel Zwart (NED), Matan Schwartz (ISR)
20 September 2025; 19:30	Report	three players 3	Goals	six players 1	11th April Sports and Recreation Center, Belgrade; Referees: Michiel Zwart (NED), Matan Schwartz (ISR)

21 September 2025; 12:30	Report	Steaua București (Romania)	21–8	(France) Pays d'Aix Natation	11th April Sports and Recreation Center, Belgrade; Referees: Matan Schwartz (ISR), Hendrik Schopp (GER)
21 September 2025; 12:30	Report	Score by quarters: 5–1, 5–2, 4–5, 7–0			11th April Sports and Recreation Center, Belgrade; Referees: Matan Schwartz (ISR), Hendrik Schopp (GER)
21 September 2025; 12:30	Report	Vucinic 4	Goals	Bachelier 2	11th April Sports and Recreation Center, Belgrade; Referees: Matan Schwartz (ISR), Hendrik Schopp (GER)

21 September 2025; 19:30	Report	Novi Beograd (Serbia)	16–18 (PSO)	(Montenegro) Primorac Kotor	11th April Sports and Recreation Center, Belgrade; Referees: David Pordomingo Gomez (ESP), Michiel Zwart (NED)
21 September 2025; 19:30	Report	Score by quarters: 4–2, 2–5, 4–3, 3–3 PSO: 3–5			11th April Sports and Recreation Center, Belgrade; Referees: David Pordomingo Gomez (ESP), Michiel Zwart (NED)
21 September 2025; 19:30	Report	Cuk, Perković 3	Goals	Mršić 6	11th April Sports and Recreation Center, Belgrade; Referees: David Pordomingo Gomez (ESP), Michiel Zwart (NED)

=== Group B ===
19–21 September 2025, Sabadell, Spain

Pos	Team	Pld	W	PSW	PSL	L	GF	GA	GD	Pts	Qualification	VAS	SAB	SPA
1	(Hungary) Vasas SC	2	2	0	0	0	29	26	+3	6	Group stage	—	—	—
2	(Spain) KEIO CN Sabadell (H)	2	1	0	0	1	22	23	−1	3	Group stage	10–12	—	12–11
3	(Germany) Spandau 04	2	0	0	0	2	27	29	−2	0		16–17	—	—

Source: European Aquatics Champions League
(H) Host

19 September 2025; 19:00	Report	Spandau 04 (Germany)	16–17	(Hungary) Vasas SC	Can Llong pool, Sabadell; Referees: Ante Bura (CRO), Veselin Miskovic (MNE)
19 September 2025; 19:00	Report	Score by quarters: 3–6, 4–3, 5–2, 4–6			Can Llong pool, Sabadell; Referees: Ante Bura (CRO), Veselin Miskovic (MNE)
19 September 2025; 19:00	Report	Nagy 5	Goals	Gyárfás 5	Can Llong pool, Sabadell; Referees: Ante Bura (CRO), Veselin Miskovic (MNE)

20 September 2025; 13:00	Report	KEIO CN Sabadell (Spain)	12–11	(Germany) Spandau 04	Can Llong pool, Sabadell; Referees: Raffaele Colombo (ITA), Ante Bura (CRO)
20 September 2025; 13:00	Report	Score by quarters: 4–3, 2–1, 4–4, 2–3			Can Llong pool, Sabadell; Referees: Raffaele Colombo (ITA), Ante Bura (CRO)
20 September 2025; 13:00	Report	four players 2	Goals	Stamm 4	Can Llong pool, Sabadell; Referees: Raffaele Colombo (ITA), Ante Bura (CRO)

21 September 2025; 12:30	Report	KEIO CN Sabadell (Spain)	10–12	(Hungary) Vasas SC	Can Llong pool, Sabadell; Referees: Veselin Miskovic (MNE), Raffaele Colombo (ITA)
21 September 2025; 12:30	Report	Score by quarters: 3–2, 2–4, 3–6, 2–0			Can Llong pool, Sabadell; Referees: Veselin Miskovic (MNE), Raffaele Colombo (ITA)
21 September 2025; 12:30	Report	Cabañas 4	Goals	Bátori 3	Can Llong pool, Sabadell; Referees: Veselin Miskovic (MNE), Raffaele Colombo (ITA)

=== Group C ===
19–21 September 2025, Zagreb, Croatia

Pos	Team	Pld	W	PSW	PSL	L	GF	GA	GD	Pts	Qualification	MLA	BRE	VOU
1	(Croatia) HAVK Mladost Zagreb (H)	2	2	0	0	0	34	12	+22	6	Group stage	—	18–8	16–4
2	(Italy) AN Brescia	2	1	0	0	1	23	31	−8	3	Group stage	—	—	—
3	(Greece) NO Vouliagmeni	2	0	0	0	2	17	31	−14	0		—	13–15	—

Source: European Aquatics Champions League
(H) Host

19 September 2025; 19:00	Report	NO Vouliagmeni (Greece)	13–15	(Italy) AN Brescia	Bazen Mladost, Zagreb; Referees: Boris Margeta (SLO), Sebastien Dervieux (FRA)
19 September 2025; 19:00	Report	Score by quarters: 4–6, 0–4, 4–1, 5–4			Bazen Mladost, Zagreb; Referees: Boris Margeta (SLO), Sebastien Dervieux (FRA)
19 September 2025; 19:00	Report	Troulos 4	Goals	Gianazza 4	Bazen Mladost, Zagreb; Referees: Boris Margeta (SLO), Sebastien Dervieux (FRA)

20 September 2025; 19:00	Report	HAVK Mladost Zagreb (Croatia)	16–4	(Greece) NO Vouliagmeni	Bazen Mladost, Zagreb; Referees: Sebastien Dervieux (FRA), Pau Ferre Segurana (ESP)
20 September 2025; 19:00	Report	Score by quarters: 3–1, 6–2, 3–1, 4–0			Bazen Mladost, Zagreb; Referees: Sebastien Dervieux (FRA), Pau Ferre Segurana (ESP)
20 September 2025; 19:00	Report	Bašić, Lončar 4	Goals	four players 1	Bazen Mladost, Zagreb; Referees: Sebastien Dervieux (FRA), Pau Ferre Segurana (ESP)

21 September 2025; 19:00	Report	HAVK Mladost Zagreb (Croatia)	18–8	(Italy) AN Brescia	Bazen Mladost, Zagreb; Referees: Boris Margeta (SLO), Pau Ferre Segurana (ESP)
21 September 2025; 19:00	Report	Score by quarters: 4–2, 3–0, 5–1, 6–5			Bazen Mladost, Zagreb; Referees: Boris Margeta (SLO), Pau Ferre Segurana (ESP)
21 September 2025; 19:00	Report	Bašić, Nagaev 4	Goals	Alesiani 3	Bazen Mladost, Zagreb; Referees: Boris Margeta (SLO), Pau Ferre Segurana (ESP)

== See also ==
- 2025–26 European Aquatics Champions League
- 2025–26 European Aquatics Euro Cup
- 2025–26 European Aquatics Conference Cup
- 2025–26 European Aquatics Challenger Cup
- 2025 European Aquatics Super Cup
- 2025–26 European Aquatics Women's Champions League
- 2025–26 European Aquatics Women's Euro Cup
- 2025–26 European Aquatics Women's Conference Cup
- 2025–26 European Aquatics Women's Challenger Cup
- 2025 European Aquatics Women's Super Cup

Reference
Matchday 1
Matchday 2
Matchday 3
