= Dušan Banićević =

Montenegrin water polo player

Personal information
- Nationality: Montenegro
- Born: 12 October 1998 (age 28)
- Height: 1.86
- Weight: 79

Sport
- Sport: Water polo
- Position: Center Forward
- Current club: Panathinaikos
- Number: 12

Senior clubs
- Years: Team
- –2021: Jadran Herceg Novi
- 2021–2023: Sabadell
- 2023–2024: Spandau
- 2024–2025: Jadran Split
- 2025–: Panathinaikos
Medal record
Men's water polo
Representing Montenegro
Mediterranean Games
Silver medal – second place	2026 Taranto	Team

Dušan Banićević (born 12 October 1998) is a Montenegrin water polo player. He competed in the 2020 Summer Olympics.
