= Tamás Kovács-Csatlós =

Hungarian water polo referee

- Born: May 12, 1989 (age 37); Eger, Hungary
- Occupation: Water polo referee

Tamás Kovács-Csatlós (Eger, Hungary, 12 May 1989) is a Hungarian international water polo referee, who is listed among the top officials by the World Aquatics.

Among others, he has officiated in major international competitions such as the World Aquatics World Cup 2025, the World Aquatics Championships 2025, the European Water Polo Championship 2024, the 2024 Summer Olympics, and the 2026 Men’s European Water Polo Championship.
