= Francesco Condemi =

Italian water polo player (born 2003)

Personal information
- Born: 23 December 2003 (age 22) Catania, Italy
- Height: 190 cm (6 ft 3 in)
Medal record
Men's water polo
Representing Italy
World Championships
Silver medal – second place	2024 Doha	Team
European Championship
Bronze medal – third place	2024 Zagreb
World Cup
Silver medal – second place	2023 Los Angeles
Bronze medal – third place	2026 Sydney
Mediterranean Games
Gold medal – first place	2026 Taranto	Team

Francesco Condemi (born 23 December 2003) is an Italian water polo player. He represented Italy at the 2024 Summer Olympics.
