= Matteo Iocchi Gratta =

Italian water polo player (born 2002)

Personal information
- Nationality: Italian
- Born: 1 September 2002 (age 24) Berane, Serbia and Montenegro
- Height: 195 cm (6 ft 5 in)
Medal record
Men's water polo
Representing Italy
World Championships
Silver medal – second place	2022 Budapest	Team
Silver medal – second place	2024 Doha	Team
World Cup
Silver medal – second place	2023 Los Angeles
Bronze medal – third place	2026 Sydney
Mediterranean Games
Gold medal – first place	2026 Taranto	Team

Matteo Iocchi Gratta (born 1 September 2002) is a Montenegro-born Italian water polo player. He represented Italy at the 2024 Summer Olympics.
