= Vince Vigvári =

Hungarian water polo player (born 2003)

Vince Pal Vigvári
Personal information
- Nationality: Hungarian
- Born: 23 June 2003 (age 23) Budapest, Hungary
- Height: 188 cm (6 ft 2 in)
Medal record
World Championship
Silver medal – second place	2025 Singapore	Team
European Championship
Silver medal – second place	2026 Belgrade

Vince Pal Vigvári (born 23 June 2003) is a Hungarian water polo player. He represented Hungary at the 2024 Summer Olympics.
