= Vasilije Martinović =

Serbian water polo player (born 2003)

Personal information
- Born: 13 January 2003 (age 23)

Sport
- Sport: Water polo
- Handedness: Right
- Position: Driver
- Current club: VK Novi Beograd
National team
Years	Team	Apps	(Gls)
2023–present	Serbia	56	(75)
Medal record
Men's water polo
Representing Serbia
European Championships
Gold medal – first place	2026 Belgrade
Mediterranean Games
Bronze medal – third place	2026 Taranto	Team

Vasilije Martinović (Serbian: Василије Мартиновић; born 13 January 2003) is a Serbian water polo player who plays for VK Novi Beograd.

He represents the Serbian national water polo team and won a gold medal at 2026 Men's European Water Polo Championship held in Belgrade, Serbia.
