= Water polo at the 2025 World Aquatics Championships =

- Host city: Singapore
- Date(s): 11–25 July
- Venue(s): OCBC Aquatic Centre
- Events: 2

Two water polo competitions took place as part of the 2025 World Aquatics Championships between 11 and 25 July 2025 at the OCBC Aquatic Centre in Singapore.

== Qualification ==
A total of 16 teams qualified for each tournament.

=== Men ===
Event	Dates	Hosts	Quota	Qualifier(s)
Host nation	—	—	1	Singapore
2024 Summer Olympics	28 July – 11 August 2024	(France) Paris	3	Croatia; Serbia; United States
2025 World Cup	18 December 2024 – 13 April 2025	(Montenegro) Podgorica	3	Hungary; Greece; Spain
2025 Asian Championship	25 February – 2 March 2025	(China) Zhaoqing	2	China; Japan
2024 Pan American Championship	20–26 November 2024	(Colombia) Ibagué	2	Brazil; Canada
2024 European Championship	4–16 January 2024	(Croatia) Dubrovnik/Zagreb	3	Italy; Montenegro; Romania
African selection	—	—	1	South Africa
Oceanian qualification	17–22 April 2025	(Australia) Perth	1	Australia
Total			16	

=== Women ===
Event	Dates	Hosts	Quota	Qualifier(s)
Host nation	—	—	1	Singapore
2024 Summer Olympics	27 July – 10 August 2024	(France) Paris	3	Spain; Australia; Netherlands
2025 World Cup	14 December 2024 – 20 April 2025	(China) Chengdu	3	Greece; Hungary; Italy
2025 Asian Championship	25 February – 2 March 2025	(China) Zhaoqing	2	China; Japan
2024 Pan American Championship	20–25 November 2024	(Colombia) Ibagué	2	Argentina; United States
2024 European Championship	5–13 January 2024	(Netherlands) Eindhoven	3	Croatia; France; Great Britain
African selection	—	—	1	South Africa
Oceanian selection	—	—	1	New Zealand
Total			16	

== Medalists ==
=== Medal table ===
* Host nation (Singapore)

Rank	Nation	Gold	Silver	Bronze	Total
1	Greece	1	0	1	2
1	Spain	1	0	1	2
3	Hungary	0	2	0	2
Totals (3 entries)		2	2	2	6

=== Medal summary ===
Event	Gold	Silver	Bronze
Men	Spain	Hungary	Greece
Women	Greece	Hungary	Spain
