= Water polo at the 2025 World Aquatics Championships – Men's tournament =

Tournament details
- Host country: Singapore
- Venue: 1 (in 1 host city)
- Dates: 12–24 July
- Teams: 16 (from 5 confederations)

Final positions
- Champions: Spain (4th title)
- Runners-up: Hungary
- Third place: Greece
- Fourth place: Serbia

Tournament statistics
- Matches played: 48
- Goals scored: 1,280 (26.67 per match)
- Top scorers: (Canada) Reuel D'Souza (26 goals)

Awards
- Best player: (Spain) Álvaro Granados
- Best goalkeeper: (Greece) Panagiotis Tzortzatos

The men's water polo tournament at the 2025 World Aquatics Championships was held from 12 to 24 July 2025. This was the 22nd time that the men's water polo tournament has been played since the first edition in 1973. Croatia were the defending champions, having beaten Italy in Doha 2024.

Spain won their fourth title by defeating Hungary in the final.

== Qualification ==
Map of qualifiers for the 2025 World Aquatics Championships: Team qualified for 2025 World Aquatics Championships Team failed to qualify Team banned from competition Did not enter

Qualification took place between January 2024 and April 2025, with a mix of international competitions organised by World Aquatics and continental championships held by the regional bodies acting as qualification. Overall, 42 countries took part in qualification. The slot allocation was as follows:

- Host nation: 1 slot
- 2024 Summer Olympics: 3 slots
- 2025 World Cup: 3 slots
- 2025 Asian Championship: 3 slots
- 2024 Pan American Championship: 2 slots
- 2024 European Championship: 3 slots
- African selection: 1 slot
- Oceanian qualification: 1 slot

Of the 16 countries that qualified, 14 took part in 2024, with one change coming from Asia where hosts, Singapore, replaced Kazakhstan, marking Singapore's debut in the tournament. Kazakhstan's non-qualification results in them missing out for the first time since 2007. Canada qualified having missed out on the previous edition, while 2024 fourth place finishers, France, failed to qualify for the first time since 2022.

The highest ranked team that failed to qualify was France, ranked 10th, while hosts Singapore are the lowest ranked team participating, ranked 38th.

Event	Dates	Hosts	Quota	Qualifier(s)
Host nation	—N/a	—N/a	1	Singapore
2024 Summer Olympics	28 July – 11 August 2024	(France) Paris	3	Croatia; Serbia; United States
2025 World Cup	18 December 2024 – 13 April 2025	(Montenegro) Podgorica	3	Hungary; Greece; Spain
2025 Asian Championship	25 February – 2 March 2025	(China) Zhaoqing	2	China; Japan
2024 Pan American Championship	20–26 November 2024	(Colombia) Ibagué	2	Brazil; Canada
2024 European Championship	4–16 January 2024	(Croatia) Dubrovnik/Zagreb	3	Italy; Montenegro; Romania
African selection	—N/a	—N/a	1	South Africa
Oceanian qualification	17–22 April 2025	(Australia) Perth	1	Australia
Total			16	

=== Summary of qualified teams ===
Team	Qualification method	Date of qualification	Appearance(s)				Previous best performance (Note: Bold text indicates they hosted that edition.)	WR
Team	Qualification method	Date of qualification	Total	First	Last	Streak	Previous best performance	WR
Singapore	Host nation	9 February 2023	1st	Debut				38
Croatia	2024 Olympics	9 August 2024	15th	1994	2024	15	Champions (2007, 2017, 2024)	1
Serbia	2024 Olympics	9 August 2024	11th	2007	2024	11	Champions (2009, 2015)	5
United States	2024 Olympics	11 August 2024	22nd	1973	2024	22	Fourth place (1986, 1991, 2009)	6
Brazil	2024 Pan American Championship	23 November 2024	12th	1986	2024	2	Tenth place (2015)	10
Canada	2024 Pan American Championship	25 November 2024	19th	1973	2023	1	Eighth place (2009)	13
China	2025 Asian Championship	1 March 2025	12th	1982	2024	3	Tenth place (1982)	19
Japan	2025 Asian Championship	1 March 2025	12th	2001	2024	7	Ninth place (2022)	12
Greece	2025 World Cup	11 April 2025	19th	1973	2024	8	Runners-up (2023)	4
Hungary	2025 World Cup	11 April 2025	22nd	1973	2024	22	Champions (1973, 2003, 2013, 2023)	3
Spain	2025 World Cup	11 April 2025	21st	1973	2024	6	Champions (1998, 2001, 2022)	2
Italy	2024 European Championship (Note: Due to time constraints, no European qualification took place so the results from the 2024 European Championship were used to decide the three teams who qualified from Europe.)	11 April 2025	22nd	1973	2024	22	Champions (1978, 1994, 2011, 2019)	7
Montenegro	2024 European Championship	11 April 2025	10th	2009	2024	10	Runners-up (2013)	8
Romania	2024 European Championship	11 April 2025	13th	1973	2024	2	Fifth place (1975)	14
Australia	Winner of Oceanian qualification	19 April 2025	22nd	1973	2024	22	Fourth place (1998)	11
South Africa	African selection	6 May 2025	14th	1994	2024	12	Twelfth place (2005, 2019, 2022)	25

== Final draw ==
The Final draw was held at 17:00 CET on 7 May 2025 at the World Aquatics' interim headquarters in Budapest, Hungary. The draw was hosted by sports presenter Edit Szalay. Water polo players, Laura Ester and Filip Filipović, alongside World Aquatics President Husain Al-Musallam and Singaporean Olympian Mark Chay, were the guests who assisted with the draw. The draw started with, in order, pots 4, 3, 2 and 1 being drawn, with each team selected then allocated into the first available group alphabetically. The position for the team within the group would then be drawn (for the purpose of the schedule). There were no draw restrictions.

=== Seeding ===
The seeding was announced on 6 May 2025, a day before the draw. For the first time since 2019, a team from outside Europe has been placed in pot 1.

Pot 1	Pot 2	Pot 3	Pot 4
Serbia; Croatia; United States; Spain	Greece; Hungary; Italy; Brazil	Montenegro; Australia; Romania; Canada	Japan; China; South Africa; Singapore

=== Draw ===
For the first time ever, one of the groups (group C) contained no European teams.

Group A
Pos	Team
A1	Italy
A2	Serbia
A3	Romania
A4	South Africa

Group B
Pos	Team
B1	Australia
B2	Spain
B3	Hungary
B4	Japan

Group C
Pos	Team
C1	Singapore
C2	Canada
C3	Brazil
C4	United States

Group D
Pos	Team
D1	Greece
D2	China
D3	Montenegro
D4	Croatia

== Referees ==
On 26 April 2025, the following referees were announced as officiating the championship.

Region	Country	Referees
Africa	Egypt	Yasser Mehalhel
Africa	South Africa	Dasch Barber
Americas	Argentina	Germán Moller
Americas	Brazil	Marcella Braga
Americas	Canada	Evan Andrews
Americas	United States	Jennifer McCall
Americas	United States	Scott Voltz
Asia	China	Zhang Liang
Asia	Japan	Chisato Kurosaki

Region	Country	Referees
Asia	Singapore	Wu Zhekang
Europe	Croatia	Andrej Franulović
Europe	France	Aurély Blanchard
Europe	Germany	Frank Ohme
Europe	Great Britain	Maxim Gerasimov
Europe	Greece	Georgios Stavridis
Europe	Hungary	Tamás Kovács-Csatlós
Europe	Italy	Alessia Ferrari
Europe	Montenegro	Stanko Ivanovski

Region	Country	Referees
Europe	Netherlands	Michiel Zwart
Europe	Romania	Mihai Balanescu
Europe	Serbia	Ivan Raković
Europe	Slovenia	Boris Margeta
Europe	Spain	David Gómez
Europe	Spain	Marta Cabanas
Oceania	Australia	Fiona Haigh
Oceania	Australia	Nicholas Hodgers
Oceania	New Zealand	Megan Perry

== Preliminary round ==
The schedule was announced on 26 May 2025.

All times are local (UTC+8).

=== Group A ===
Pos	Team	Pld	W	PSW	PSL	L	GF	GA	GD	Pts	Qualification
1	Italy	3	2	1	0	0	58	22	+36	8	Quarterfinals
2	Serbia	3	2	0	1	0	59	25	+34	7	Playoffs
3	Romania	3	1	0	0	2	38	41	−3	3	Playoffs
4	South Africa	3	0	0	0	3	12	79	−67	0	13–16th place semifinals

Source: Omegatiming
Rules for classification: 1) points; 2) head-to-head points; 3) head-to-head goal difference; 4) head-to-head number of goals scored; 5) Goal difference.

12 July 2025; 09:00	Report	Serbia	27–3	South Africa	OCBC Aquatic Centre, Singapore; Referees: Yasser Mehalhel (EGY), Stanko Ivanovski (MNE)
12 July 2025; 09:00	Report	Score by quarters: 8–0, 6–3, 4–0, 9–0			OCBC Aquatic Centre, Singapore; Referees: Yasser Mehalhel (EGY), Stanko Ivanovski (MNE)
12 July 2025; 09:00	Report	Mandić 6	Goals	three players 1	OCBC Aquatic Centre, Singapore; Referees: Yasser Mehalhel (EGY), Stanko Ivanovski (MNE)

12 July 2025; 20:45	Report	Romania	5–17	Italy	OCBC Aquatic Centre, Singapore; Referees: Zhang Liang (CHN), Georgios Stavridis (GRE)
12 July 2025; 20:45	Report	Score by quarters: 2–1, 0–5, 2–6, 1–5			OCBC Aquatic Centre, Singapore; Referees: Zhang Liang (CHN), Georgios Stavridis (GRE)
12 July 2025; 20:45	Report	Neamtu 3	Goals	Condemi 4	OCBC Aquatic Centre, Singapore; Referees: Zhang Liang (CHN), Georgios Stavridis (GRE)

14 July 2025; 10:35	Report	South Africa	5–24	Romania	OCBC Aquatic Centre, Singapore; Referees: Evan Andrews (CAN), Andrej Franulović (CRO)
14 July 2025; 10:35	Report	Score by quarters: 0–8, 1–3, 3–7, 1–6			OCBC Aquatic Centre, Singapore; Referees: Evan Andrews (CAN), Andrej Franulović (CRO)
14 July 2025; 10:35	Report	D. Sneddon 2	Goals	Georgescu, Iudean 4	OCBC Aquatic Centre, Singapore; Referees: Evan Andrews (CAN), Andrej Franulović (CRO)

14 July 2025; 20:45	Report	Italy	17–16 (PSO)	Serbia	OCBC Aquatic Centre, Singapore; Referees: Scott Voltz (USA), Boris Margeta (SLO)
14 July 2025; 20:45	Report	Score by quarters: 3–2, 3–3, 4–4, 3–4 PSO: 4–3			OCBC Aquatic Centre, Singapore; Referees: Scott Voltz (USA), Boris Margeta (SLO)
14 July 2025; 20:45	Report	Cannella 3	Goals	Mandić 5	OCBC Aquatic Centre, Singapore; Referees: Scott Voltz (USA), Boris Margeta (SLO)

16 July 2025; 13:45	Report	Italy	28–4	South Africa	OCBC Aquatic Centre, Singapore; Referees: Georgios Stavridis (GRE), Evan Andrews (CAN)
16 July 2025; 13:45	Report	Score by quarters: 6–1, 9–0, 8–1, 5–2			OCBC Aquatic Centre, Singapore; Referees: Georgios Stavridis (GRE), Evan Andrews (CAN)
16 July 2025; 13:45	Report	Cassia, Ferrero 4	Goals	four players 1	OCBC Aquatic Centre, Singapore; Referees: Georgios Stavridis (GRE), Evan Andrews (CAN)

16 July 2025; 16:00	Report	Serbia	19–9	Romania	OCBC Aquatic Centre, Singapore; Referees: Stanko Ivanovski (MKD), Jennifer McCall (USA)
16 July 2025; 16:00	Report	Score by quarters: 5–1, 4–1, 5–3, 5–4			OCBC Aquatic Centre, Singapore; Referees: Stanko Ivanovski (MKD), Jennifer McCall (USA)
16 July 2025; 16:00	Report	Ranđelović 4	Goals	three players 2	OCBC Aquatic Centre, Singapore; Referees: Stanko Ivanovski (MKD), Jennifer McCall (USA)

=== Group B ===
Pos	Team	Pld	W	PSW	PSL	L	GF	GA	GD	Pts	Qualification
1	Spain	3	3	0	0	0	42	32	+10	9	Quarterfinals
2	Hungary	3	2	0	0	1	50	34	+16	6	Playoffs
3	Japan	3	1	0	0	2	46	56	−10	3	Playoffs
4	Australia	3	0	0	0	3	24	40	−16	0	13–16th place semifinals

Source: Omegatiming
Rules for classification: 1) points; 2) head-to-head points; 3) head-to-head goal difference; 4) head-to-head number of goals scored; 5) Goal difference.

12 July 2025; 16:00	Report	Spain	22–16	Japan	OCBC Aquatic Centre, Singapore; Referees: Scott Voltz (USA), Michiel Zwart (NED)
12 July 2025; 16:00	Report	Score by quarters: 5–3, 6–2, 5–4, 6–7			OCBC Aquatic Centre, Singapore; Referees: Scott Voltz (USA), Michiel Zwart (NED)
12 July 2025; 16:00	Report	Granados 5	Goals	Inaba 5	OCBC Aquatic Centre, Singapore; Referees: Scott Voltz (USA), Michiel Zwart (NED)

12 July 2025; 17:35	Report	Hungary	18–6	Australia	OCBC Aquatic Centre, Singapore; Referees: Andrej Franulović (CRO), Boris Margeta (SLO)
12 July 2025; 17:35	Report	Score by quarters: 5–1, 4–0, 3–2, 6–3			OCBC Aquatic Centre, Singapore; Referees: Andrej Franulović (CRO), Boris Margeta (SLO)
12 July 2025; 17:35	Report	Vámos 3	Goals	Grgurevic 3	OCBC Aquatic Centre, Singapore; Referees: Andrej Franulović (CRO), Boris Margeta (SLO)

14 July 2025; 13:45	Report	Japan	18–23	Hungary	OCBC Aquatic Centre, Singapore; Referees: Georgios Stavridis (GRE), Germán Moller (ARG)
14 July 2025; 13:45	Report	Score by quarters: 5–5, 3–5, 3–5, 7–8			OCBC Aquatic Centre, Singapore; Referees: Georgios Stavridis (GRE), Germán Moller (ARG)
14 July 2025; 13:45	Report	Adachi, Watanabe 4	Goals	Vismeg 4	OCBC Aquatic Centre, Singapore; Referees: Georgios Stavridis (GRE), Germán Moller (ARG)

14 July 2025; 16:00	Report	Australia	7–10	Spain	OCBC Aquatic Centre, Singapore; Referees: Stanko Ivanovski (MNE), Frank Ohme (GER)
14 July 2025; 16:00	Report	Score by quarters: 0–4, 2–5, 2–0, 3–1			OCBC Aquatic Centre, Singapore; Referees: Stanko Ivanovski (MNE), Frank Ohme (GER)
14 July 2025; 16:00	Report	Pavillard 2	Goals	three players 2	OCBC Aquatic Centre, Singapore; Referees: Stanko Ivanovski (MNE), Frank Ohme (GER)

16 July 2025; 10:35	Report	Australia	11–12	Japan	OCBC Aquatic Centre, Singapore; Referees: Germán Moller (ARG), Michiel Zwart (NED)
16 July 2025; 10:35	Report	Score by quarters: 3–3, 2–3, 2–0, 4–6			OCBC Aquatic Centre, Singapore; Referees: Germán Moller (ARG), Michiel Zwart (NED)
16 July 2025; 10:35	Report	Power 5	Goals	four players 2	OCBC Aquatic Centre, Singapore; Referees: Germán Moller (ARG), Michiel Zwart (NED)

16 July 2025; 20:45	Report	Spain	10–9	Hungary	OCBC Aquatic Centre, Singapore; Referees: Andrej Franulović (CRO), Zhang Liang (CHN)
16 July 2025; 20:45	Report	Score by quarters: 2–2, 1–3, 2–3, 5–1			OCBC Aquatic Centre, Singapore; Referees: Andrej Franulović (CRO), Zhang Liang (CHN)
16 July 2025; 20:45	Report	Granados 4	Goals	Angyal, Vigvári 2	OCBC Aquatic Centre, Singapore; Referees: Andrej Franulović (CRO), Zhang Liang (CHN)

=== Group C ===
Pos	Team	Pld	W	PSW	PSL	L	GF	GA	GD	Pts	Qualification
1	United States	3	3	0	0	0	60	22	+38	9	Quarterfinals
2	Brazil	3	1	1	0	1	37	35	+2	5	Playoffs
3	Canada	3	1	0	1	1	42	39	+3	4	Playoffs
4	Singapore (H)	3	0	0	0	3	24	67	−43	0	13–16th place semifinals

Source: Omegatiming
Rules for classification: 1) points; 2) head-to-head points; 3) head-to-head goal difference; 4) head-to-head number of goals scored; 5) Goal difference.
(H) Host

12 July 2025; 10:35	Report	Canada	9–18	United States	OCBC Aquatic Centre, Singapore; Referees: Dasch Barber (RSA), Ivan Raković (SRB)
12 July 2025; 10:35	Report	Score by quarters: 0–3, 2–4, 2–5, 5–6			OCBC Aquatic Centre, Singapore; Referees: Dasch Barber (RSA), Ivan Raković (SRB)
12 July 2025; 10:35	Report	Oussadou 3	Goals	Irving 4	OCBC Aquatic Centre, Singapore; Referees: Dasch Barber (RSA), Ivan Raković (SRB)

12 July 2025; 13:45	Report	Brazil	19–8	Singapore	OCBC Aquatic Centre, Singapore; Referees: Alessia Ferrari (ITA), Chisato Kurosaki (JPN)
12 July 2025; 13:45	Report	Score by quarters: 4–0, 5–1, 6–3, 4–4			OCBC Aquatic Centre, Singapore; Referees: Alessia Ferrari (ITA), Chisato Kurosaki (JPN)
12 July 2025; 13:45	Report	three players 3	Goals	Rajandra 3	OCBC Aquatic Centre, Singapore; Referees: Alessia Ferrari (ITA), Chisato Kurosaki (JPN)

14 July 2025; 09:00	Report	United States	16–7	Brazil	OCBC Aquatic Centre, Singapore; Referees: Nicholas Hodgers (AUS), Maxim Gerasimov (GBR)
14 July 2025; 09:00	Report	Score by quarters: 6–1, 2–0, 4–3, 4–3			OCBC Aquatic Centre, Singapore; Referees: Nicholas Hodgers (AUS), Maxim Gerasimov (GBR)
14 July 2025; 09:00	Report	R. Dodd, Irving 4	Goals	Farias 3	OCBC Aquatic Centre, Singapore; Referees: Nicholas Hodgers (AUS), Maxim Gerasimov (GBR)

14 July 2025; 19:10	Report	Singapore	10–22	Canada	OCBC Aquatic Centre, Singapore; Referees: Tamás Kovács (HUN), Mihai Balanescu (ROU)
14 July 2025; 19:10	Report	Score by quarters: 5–7, 2–5, 2–4, 1–6			OCBC Aquatic Centre, Singapore; Referees: Tamás Kovács (HUN), Mihai Balanescu (ROU)
14 July 2025; 19:10	Report	Goh 4	Goals	D'Souza 7	OCBC Aquatic Centre, Singapore; Referees: Tamás Kovács (HUN), Mihai Balanescu (ROU)

16 July 2025; 09:00	Report	Canada	18–19 (PSO)	Brazil	OCBC Aquatic Centre, Singapore; Referees: Mihai Balanescu (ROU), Chisato Kurosaki (JPN)
16 July 2025; 09:00	Report	Score by quarters: 6–2, 1–3, 3–4, 1–2 PSO: 7–8			OCBC Aquatic Centre, Singapore; Referees: Mihai Balanescu (ROU), Chisato Kurosaki (JPN)
16 July 2025; 09:00	Report	Côté, D'Souza 3	Goals	Andrade 8	OCBC Aquatic Centre, Singapore; Referees: Mihai Balanescu (ROU), Chisato Kurosaki (JPN)

16 July 2025; 19:10	Report	Singapore	6–26	United States	OCBC Aquatic Centre, Singapore; Referees: Ivan Raković (SRB), Yasser Mehalhel (EGY)
16 July 2025; 19:10	Report	Score by quarters: 0–4, 2–4, 2–10, 2–8			OCBC Aquatic Centre, Singapore; Referees: Ivan Raković (SRB), Yasser Mehalhel (EGY)
16 July 2025; 19:10	Report	See 2	Goals	R. Dodd, Irving 4	OCBC Aquatic Centre, Singapore; Referees: Ivan Raković (SRB), Yasser Mehalhel (EGY)

=== Group D ===
Pos	Team	Pld	W	PSW	PSL	L	GF	GA	GD	Pts	Qualification
1	Croatia	3	3	0	0	0	48	26	+22	9	Quarterfinals
2	Montenegro	3	2	0	0	1	34	30	+4	6	Playoffs
3	Greece	3	1	0	0	2	44	25	+19	3	Playoffs
4	China	3	0	0	0	3	19	64	−45	0	13–16th place semifinals

Source: Omegatiming
Rules for classification: 1) points; 2) head-to-head points; 3) head-to-head goal difference; 4) head-to-head number of goals scored; 5) Goal difference.

12 July 2025; 12:10	Report	China	6–25	Croatia	OCBC Aquatic Centre, Singapore; Referees: Mihai Balanescu (ROU), Nicholas Hodgers (AUS)
12 July 2025; 12:10	Report	Score by quarters: 1–7, 0–5, 4–7, 1–6			OCBC Aquatic Centre, Singapore; Referees: Mihai Balanescu (ROU), Nicholas Hodgers (AUS)
12 July 2025; 12:10	Report	Xie 2	Goals	Bukić 6	OCBC Aquatic Centre, Singapore; Referees: Mihai Balanescu (ROU), Nicholas Hodgers (AUS)

12 July 2025; 19:10	Report	Montenegro	10–9	Greece	OCBC Aquatic Centre, Singapore; Referees: Tamás Kovács-Csatlós (HUN), David Gómez (ESP)
12 July 2025; 19:10	Report	Score by quarters: 5–3, 2–3, 1–1, 2–2			OCBC Aquatic Centre, Singapore; Referees: Tamás Kovács-Csatlós (HUN), David Gómez (ESP)
12 July 2025; 19:10	Report	Gardašević, Radović 3	Goals	Gkillas 3	OCBC Aquatic Centre, Singapore; Referees: Tamás Kovács-Csatlós (HUN), David Gómez (ESP)

14 July 2025; 12:10	Report	Greece	26–5	China	OCBC Aquatic Centre, Singapore; Referees: Marta Cabanas (ESP), Chisato Kurosaki (JPN)
14 July 2025; 12:10	Report	Score by quarters: 2–0, 10–0, 6–3, 8–2			OCBC Aquatic Centre, Singapore; Referees: Marta Cabanas (ESP), Chisato Kurosaki (JPN)
14 July 2025; 12:10	Report	Nikolaidis 5	Goals	five players 1	OCBC Aquatic Centre, Singapore; Referees: Marta Cabanas (ESP), Chisato Kurosaki (JPN)

14 July 2025; 17:35	Report	Croatia	13–11	Montenegro	OCBC Aquatic Centre, Singapore; Referees: Michiel Zwart (NED), Ivan Raković (SRB)
14 July 2025; 17:35	Report	Score by quarters: 3–2, 2–3, 3–2, 5–4			OCBC Aquatic Centre, Singapore; Referees: Michiel Zwart (NED), Ivan Raković (SRB)
14 July 2025; 17:35	Report	Bukić, Fatović 3	Goals	Banićević, Radović 3	OCBC Aquatic Centre, Singapore; Referees: Michiel Zwart (NED), Ivan Raković (SRB)

16 July 2025; 12:10	Report	China	8–13	Montenegro	OCBC Aquatic Centre, Singapore; Referees: Dasch Barber (RSA), Tamás Kovács-Csatlós (HUN)
16 July 2025; 12:10	Report	Score by quarters: 0–3, 2–2, 3–3, 3–5			OCBC Aquatic Centre, Singapore; Referees: Dasch Barber (RSA), Tamás Kovács-Csatlós (HUN)
16 July 2025; 12:10	Report	Chen Z. 3	Goals	four players 2	OCBC Aquatic Centre, Singapore; Referees: Dasch Barber (RSA), Tamás Kovács-Csatlós (HUN)

16 July 2025; 17:35	Report	Greece	9–10	Croatia	OCBC Aquatic Centre, Singapore; Referees: Nicholas Hodgers (AUS), David Gómez (ESP)
16 July 2025; 17:35	Report	Score by quarters: 4–1, 2–4, 1–4, 2–1			OCBC Aquatic Centre, Singapore; Referees: Nicholas Hodgers (AUS), David Gómez (ESP)
16 July 2025; 17:35	Report	Alafragkis, Kalogeropoulos 2	Goals	Fatović 3	OCBC Aquatic Centre, Singapore; Referees: Nicholas Hodgers (AUS), David Gómez (ESP)

== Knockout stage ==
=== Bracket ===
Championship bracket

Playoffs
18 July
Brazil	5
Greece	17
18 July
Canada	10
Montenegro	22
18 July
Serbia	21
Japan	14
18 July
Romania	11
Hungary	15

Quarter-finals
20 July
Italy	11
Greece	17
20 July
Spain	14
Montenegro	5
20 July
United States	9
Serbia	14
20 July
Croatia	12
Hungary	18

Semi-finals
22 July
Greece	7 (2)
Spain (PSO)	7 (4)
22 July
Serbia	18
Hungary	19

Final
24 July
Spain	15
Hungary	13
Third place
24 July
Greece	16
Serbia	7

5th place bracket

5th–8th place semifinals
22 July
Italy	8
Montenegro	12
22 July
United States	9
Croatia	14

Fifth place game
24 July
Montenegro	13
Croatia	19
Seventh place game
24 July
Italy	9
United States	8

9th place bracket

9th–12th place semifinals
20 July
Japan	22
Brazil	11
20 July
Romania	18
Canada	12

Ninth place game
22 July
Japan (PSO)	16 (4)
Romania	16 (3)
Eleventh place game
22 July
Brazil	11
Canada	16

13th place bracket

13th–16th place semifinals
18 July
South Africa	4
Australia	27
18 July
Singapore	8
China	21

13th place game
20 July
Australia	16
China	9
15th place game
20 July
South Africa	13
Singapore	14

=== Playoffs ===
18 July 2025; 16:00	Report	Serbia	21–14	Japan	OCBC Aquatic Centre, Singapore; Referees: David Gómez (ESP), Frank Ohme (GER)
18 July 2025; 16:00	Report	Score by quarters: 5–2, 4–3, 9–3, 3–6			OCBC Aquatic Centre, Singapore; Referees: David Gómez (ESP), Frank Ohme (GER)
18 July 2025; 16:00	Report	Vapenski 4	Goals	three players 3	OCBC Aquatic Centre, Singapore; Referees: David Gómez (ESP), Frank Ohme (GER)

18 July 2025; 17:35	Report	Romania	11–15	Hungary	OCBC Aquatic Centre, Singapore; Referees: Germán Moller (ARG), Georgios Stavridis (GRE)
18 July 2025; 17:35	Report	Score by quarters: 3–6, 3–2, 3–3, 2–4			OCBC Aquatic Centre, Singapore; Referees: Germán Moller (ARG), Georgios Stavridis (GRE)
18 July 2025; 17:35	Report	Georgescu 4	Goals	Burián 3	OCBC Aquatic Centre, Singapore; Referees: Germán Moller (ARG), Georgios Stavridis (GRE)

18 July 2025; 19:10	Report	Brazil	5–17	Greece	OCBC Aquatic Centre, Singapore; Referees: Boris Margeta (SLO), Dasch Barber (RSA)
18 July 2025; 19:10	Report	Score by quarters: 0–2, 0–5, 2–5, 3–5			OCBC Aquatic Centre, Singapore; Referees: Boris Margeta (SLO), Dasch Barber (RSA)
18 July 2025; 19:10	Report	Real 2	Goals	Chalyvopoulos, Genidounias 3	OCBC Aquatic Centre, Singapore; Referees: Boris Margeta (SLO), Dasch Barber (RSA)

18 July 2025; 20:45	Report	Canada	10–22	Montenegro	OCBC Aquatic Centre, Singapore; Referees: Nicholas Hodgers (AUS), Scott Voltz (USA)
18 July 2025; 20:45	Report	Score by quarters: 3–7, 0–5, 4–5, 3–5			OCBC Aquatic Centre, Singapore; Referees: Nicholas Hodgers (AUS), Scott Voltz (USA)
18 July 2025; 20:45	Report	D'Souza, O'Donnell 3	Goals	Ćetković 5	OCBC Aquatic Centre, Singapore; Referees: Nicholas Hodgers (AUS), Scott Voltz (USA)

=== Quarterfinals ===
20 July 2025; 16:00	Report	Italy	11–17	Greece	OCBC Aquatic Centre, Singapore; Referees: Andrej Franulović (CRO), Boris Margeta (SLO)
20 July 2025; 16:00	Report	Score by quarters: 1–6, 1–3, 4–4, 5–4			OCBC Aquatic Centre, Singapore; Referees: Andrej Franulović (CRO), Boris Margeta (SLO)
20 July 2025; 16:00	Report	Bruni 3	Goals	Argyropoulos 4	OCBC Aquatic Centre, Singapore; Referees: Andrej Franulović (CRO), Boris Margeta (SLO)

20 July 2025; 17:35	Report	Spain	14–5	Montenegro	OCBC Aquatic Centre, Singapore; Referees: Tamás Kovács-Csatlós (HUN), Ivan Raković (SRB)
20 July 2025; 17:35	Report	Score by quarters: 4–3, 4–1, 3–0, 3–1			OCBC Aquatic Centre, Singapore; Referees: Tamás Kovács-Csatlós (HUN), Ivan Raković (SRB)
20 July 2025; 17:35	Report	Sanahuja 6	Goals	five players 1	OCBC Aquatic Centre, Singapore; Referees: Tamás Kovács-Csatlós (HUN), Ivan Raković (SRB)

20 July 2025; 19:10	Report	United States	9–14	Serbia	OCBC Aquatic Centre, Singapore; Referees: Georgios Stavridis (GRE), Frank Ohme (GER)
20 July 2025; 19:10	Report	Score by quarters: 1–3, 2–3, 2–4, 4–4			OCBC Aquatic Centre, Singapore; Referees: Georgios Stavridis (GRE), Frank Ohme (GER)
20 July 2025; 19:10	Report	three players 2	Goals	four players 2	OCBC Aquatic Centre, Singapore; Referees: Georgios Stavridis (GRE), Frank Ohme (GER)

20 July 2025; 20:45	Report	Croatia	12–18	Hungary	OCBC Aquatic Centre, Singapore; Referees: Michiel Zwart (NED), David Gómez (ESP)
20 July 2025; 20:45	Report	Score by quarters: 6–6, 1–5, 2–2, 3–5			OCBC Aquatic Centre, Singapore; Referees: Michiel Zwart (NED), David Gómez (ESP)
20 July 2025; 20:45	Report	Butić 4	Goals	Manhercz 4	OCBC Aquatic Centre, Singapore; Referees: Michiel Zwart (NED), David Gómez (ESP)

=== 13th–16th place semifinals ===
18 July 2025; 09:00	Report	South Africa	4–27	Australia	OCBC Aquatic Centre, Singapore; Referees: Yasser Mehalhel (EGY), Chisato Kurosaki (JPN)
18 July 2025; 09:00	Report	Score by quarters: 1–5, 1–10, 2–9, 0–3			OCBC Aquatic Centre, Singapore; Referees: Yasser Mehalhel (EGY), Chisato Kurosaki (JPN)
18 July 2025; 09:00	Report	four players 1	Goals	three players 4	OCBC Aquatic Centre, Singapore; Referees: Yasser Mehalhel (EGY), Chisato Kurosaki (JPN)

18 July 2025; 10:35	Report	Singapore	8–21	China	OCBC Aquatic Centre, Singapore; Referees: Mihai Balanescu (ROU), Evan Andrews (CAN)
18 July 2025; 10:35	Report	Score by quarters: 1–6, 3–6, 1–5, 3–4			OCBC Aquatic Centre, Singapore; Referees: Mihai Balanescu (ROU), Evan Andrews (CAN)
18 July 2025; 10:35	Report	Lok 2	Goals	Chen Z. 6	OCBC Aquatic Centre, Singapore; Referees: Mihai Balanescu (ROU), Evan Andrews (CAN)

=== 9th–12th place semifinals ===
20 July 2025; 12:10	Report	Japan	22–11	Brazil	OCBC Aquatic Centre, Singapore; Referees: Germán Moller (ARG), Scott Voltz (USA)
20 July 2025; 12:10	Report	Score by quarters: 7–1, 7–4, 4–3, 4–3			OCBC Aquatic Centre, Singapore; Referees: Germán Moller (ARG), Scott Voltz (USA)
20 July 2025; 12:10	Report	Inaba 5	Goals	Real 3	OCBC Aquatic Centre, Singapore; Referees: Germán Moller (ARG), Scott Voltz (USA)

20 July 2025; 13:45	Report	Romania	18–12	Canada	OCBC Aquatic Centre, Singapore; Referees: Stanko Ivanovski (MNE), Nicholas Hodgers (AUS)
20 July 2025; 13:45	Report	Score by quarters: 5–1, 3–3, 5–4, 5–4			OCBC Aquatic Centre, Singapore; Referees: Stanko Ivanovski (MNE), Nicholas Hodgers (AUS)
20 July 2025; 13:45	Report	Iudean 5	Goals	D'Souza 4	OCBC Aquatic Centre, Singapore; Referees: Stanko Ivanovski (MNE), Nicholas Hodgers (AUS)

=== 5th–8th place semifinals ===
22 July 2025; 16:00	Report	Italy	8–12	Montenegro	OCBC Aquatic Centre, Singapore; Referees: Germán Moller (ARG), Georgios Stavridis (GRE)
22 July 2025; 16:00	Report	Score by quarters: 0–3, 3–4, 1–2, 4–3			OCBC Aquatic Centre, Singapore; Referees: Germán Moller (ARG), Georgios Stavridis (GRE)
22 July 2025; 16:00	Report	Di Fulvio, Di Somma 2	Goals	Vukotić 4	OCBC Aquatic Centre, Singapore; Referees: Germán Moller (ARG), Georgios Stavridis (GRE)

22 July 2025; 20:00	Report	United States	9–14	Croatia	OCBC Aquatic Centre, Singapore; Referees: Zhang Liang (CHN), Ivan Raković (SRB)
22 July 2025; 20:00	Report	Score by quarters: 1–2, 1–5, 5–3, 2–4			OCBC Aquatic Centre, Singapore; Referees: Zhang Liang (CHN), Ivan Raković (SRB)
22 July 2025; 20:00	Report	C. Dodd, Vavic 2	Goals	Burić 3	OCBC Aquatic Centre, Singapore; Referees: Zhang Liang (CHN), Ivan Raković (SRB)

=== Semifinals ===
22 July 2025; 17:35	Report	Greece	9–11 (PSO)	Spain	OCBC Aquatic Centre, Singapore; Referees: Michiel Zwart (NED), Frank Ohme (GER)
22 July 2025; 17:35	Report	Score by quarters: 2–3, 1–3, 1–0, 3–1 PSO: 2–4			OCBC Aquatic Centre, Singapore; Referees: Michiel Zwart (NED), Frank Ohme (GER)
22 July 2025; 17:35	Report	Genidounias, Gkillas 2	Goals	Sanahuja 3	OCBC Aquatic Centre, Singapore; Referees: Michiel Zwart (NED), Frank Ohme (GER)

22 July 2025; 21:35	Report	Serbia	18–19	Hungary	OCBC Aquatic Centre, Singapore; Referees: Andrej Franulović (CRO), Boris Margeta (SLO)
22 July 2025; 21:35	Report	Score by quarters: 3–6, 5–2, 4–8, 6–3			OCBC Aquatic Centre, Singapore; Referees: Andrej Franulović (CRO), Boris Margeta (SLO)
22 July 2025; 21:35	Report	Mandić 6	Goals	Fekete, Manhercz 4	OCBC Aquatic Centre, Singapore; Referees: Andrej Franulović (CRO), Boris Margeta (SLO)

=== 15th place game ===
20 July 2025; 09:00	Report	South Africa	13–14	Singapore	OCBC Aquatic Centre, Singapore; Referees: Maxim Gerasimov (GBR), Mihai Balanescu (ROU)
20 July 2025; 09:00	Report	Score by quarters: 2–7, 4–3, 3–3, 4–1			OCBC Aquatic Centre, Singapore; Referees: Maxim Gerasimov (GBR), Mihai Balanescu (ROU)
20 July 2025; 09:00	Report	Sneddon 3	Goals	Goh 3	OCBC Aquatic Centre, Singapore; Referees: Maxim Gerasimov (GBR), Mihai Balanescu (ROU)

=== 13th place game ===
20 July 2025; 10:35	Report	Australia	16–9	China	OCBC Aquatic Centre, Singapore; Referees: Dasch Barber (RSA), Alessia Ferrari (ITA)
20 July 2025; 10:35	Report	Score by quarters: 5–2, 3–1, 5–3, 3–3			OCBC Aquatic Centre, Singapore; Referees: Dasch Barber (RSA), Alessia Ferrari (ITA)
20 July 2025; 10:35	Report	Power 5	Goals	Chen Z. 3	OCBC Aquatic Centre, Singapore; Referees: Dasch Barber (RSA), Alessia Ferrari (ITA)

=== Eleventh place game ===
22 July 2025; 09:00	Report	Brazil	11–16	Canada	OCBC Aquatic Centre, Singapore; Referees: David Gómez (ESP), Nicholas Hodgers (AUS)
22 July 2025; 09:00	Report	Score by quarters: 3–1, 2–4, 1–5, 5–6			OCBC Aquatic Centre, Singapore; Referees: David Gómez (ESP), Nicholas Hodgers (AUS)
22 July 2025; 09:00	Report	Guimarães 5	Goals	D'Souza 7	OCBC Aquatic Centre, Singapore; Referees: David Gómez (ESP), Nicholas Hodgers (AUS)

=== Ninth place game ===
22 July 2025; 10:35	Report	Japan	20–19 (PSO)	Romania	OCBC Aquatic Centre, Singapore; Referees: Alessia Ferrari (ITA), Scott Voltz (USA)
22 July 2025; 10:35	Report	Score by quarters: 8–1, 4–3, 2–8, 2–4 PSO: 4–3			OCBC Aquatic Centre, Singapore; Referees: Alessia Ferrari (ITA), Scott Voltz (USA)
22 July 2025; 10:35	Report	Inaba 5	Goals	Georgescu, Neamțu 3	OCBC Aquatic Centre, Singapore; Referees: Alessia Ferrari (ITA), Scott Voltz (USA)

=== Seventh place game ===
24 July 2025; 16:00	Report	Italy	9–8	United States	OCBC Aquatic Centre, Singapore; Referees: Zhang Liang (CHN), Germán Moller (ARG)
24 July 2025; 16:00	Report	Score by quarters: 3–3, 2–1, 2–2, 2–2			OCBC Aquatic Centre, Singapore; Referees: Zhang Liang (CHN), Germán Moller (ARG)
24 July 2025; 16:00	Report	Di Somma, Ferrero 2	Goals	R. Dodd 3	OCBC Aquatic Centre, Singapore; Referees: Zhang Liang (CHN), Germán Moller (ARG)

=== Fifth place game ===
24 July 2025; 20:00	Report	Montenegro	13–19	Croatia	OCBC Aquatic Centre, Singapore; Referees: Frank Ohme (GER), Scott Volz (GER)
24 July 2025; 20:00	Report	Score by quarters: 3–3, 3–2, 2–8, 5–6			OCBC Aquatic Centre, Singapore; Referees: Frank Ohme (GER), Scott Volz (GER)
24 July 2025; 20:00	Report	Gardašević 3	Goals	Zuvela 5	OCBC Aquatic Centre, Singapore; Referees: Frank Ohme (GER), Scott Volz (GER)

=== Third place game ===
24 July 2025; 17:35	Report	Greece	16–7	Serbia	OCBC Aquatic Centre, Singapore; Referees: David Gómez (ESP), Tamás Kovács-Csatlós (HUN)
24 July 2025; 17:35	Report	Score by quarters: 2–2, 6–0, 3–3, 5–2			OCBC Aquatic Centre, Singapore; Referees: David Gómez (ESP), Tamás Kovács-Csatlós (HUN)
24 July 2025; 17:35	Report	Kalogeropoulos, Papanikolaou 2	Goals	Martinović 4	OCBC Aquatic Centre, Singapore; Referees: David Gómez (ESP), Tamás Kovács-Csatlós (HUN)

=== Final ===
24 July 2025; 21:35	Report	Spain	15–13	Hungary	OCBC Aquatic Centre, Singapore; Referees: Georgios Stavridis (GRE), Boris Margeta (SLO)
24 July 2025; 21:35	Report	Score by quarters: 5–5, 2–1, 2–4, 6–3			OCBC Aquatic Centre, Singapore; Referees: Georgios Stavridis (GRE), Boris Margeta (SLO)
24 July 2025; 21:35	Report	Sanahuja, Granados 5	Goals	Burián 3	OCBC Aquatic Centre, Singapore; Referees: Georgios Stavridis (GRE), Boris Margeta (SLO)

== Final ranking ==
Rank	Team
1st place, gold medalist(s)	Spain
2nd place, silver medalist(s)	Hungary
3rd place, bronze medalist(s)	Greece
4	Serbia
5	Croatia
6	Montenegro
7	Italy
8	United States
9	Japan
10	Romania
11	Canada
12	Brazil
13	Australia
14	China
15	Singapore
16	South Africa

2025 Men's Water Polo World Champions

Spain
Fourth title

== Statistics and awards ==
=== Top goalscorers ===
Rank	Name	Goals	Shots	%
1	(Canada) Reuel D'Souza	26	45	58
2	(Japan) Yusuke Inaba	23	49	47
2	(Montenegro) Dušan Banićević	23	40	58
4	(Spain) Álvaro Granados	21	52	40
5	(Spain) Bernat Sanahuja	20	42	48
6	(Romania) Vlad-Luca Georgescu	17	35	49
6	(Japan) Taiyo Watanabe	17	37	46
8	(Croatia) Luka Bukić	16	26	62
8	(Romania) Andrei Neamțu	16	27	59
10	(Brazil) Lucas Andrade	15	38	39
10	(United States) Ryder Dodd	15	33	45
10	(Montenegro) Filip Gardašević	15	36	42
10	(Australia) Nathan Power	15	26	58

=== Awards ===
The awards were announced on 24 July 2025.

All-star team
Goalkeeper	(Greece) Panagiotis Tzortzatos
Field player	(Canada) Reuel D’Souza
Field player	(Spain) Álvaro Granados
Field player	(Japan) Yusuke Inaba
Field player	(Serbia) Dušan Mandić
Field player	(Hungary) Krisztián Manhercz
Field player	(Greece) Stylianos Argyropoulos
Other awards
Most Valuable Player	(Spain) Álvaro Granados
Best Goalkeeper	(Greece) Panagiotis Tzortzatos
