= 2024 Pan American Water Polo Championship – Men's tournament =

Tournament details
- Host country: Colombia
- Venue: 1 (in 1 host city)
- Dates: 20–25 November
- Teams: 7

Final positions
- Champions: Brazil (3rd title)
- Runners-up: Canada
- Third place: Argentina
- Fourth place: Colombia

Tournament statistics
- Matches played: 21
- Goals scored: 632 (30.1 per match)
- Top scorer: (Brazil) Gustavo Guimarães (24 goals)

The 2024 Pan American Water Polo Championship – Men's tournament was the 11th edition of the continental championship, organised by the PanAm Aquatics. The event was held in Ibagué, Colombia. The top two in the championship qualified for the 2025 World Aquatics Championships. Canada are the defending champions.

Brazil won the championship after winning all their games.

== Teams ==
The following teams participated:

Teams
Argentina
Brazil
Canada
Colombia
Mexico
Panama
Venezuela

== Venue ==
The venue is the Parque Deportivo in Ibagué, Colombia.

== Group standings ==
Pos	Team	Pld	W	PSW	PSL	L	GF	GA	GD	Pts	Qualification
1	Brazil	6	6	0	0	0	143	39	+104	18	Qualified for 2025 World Aquatics Championships
2	Canada	6	4	1	0	1	115	37	+78	14	Qualified for 2025 World Aquatics Championships
3	Argentina	6	4	0	1	1	117	46	+71	13	
4	Colombia	6	3	0	0	3	125	61	+64	9	
5	Venezuela	6	1	1	0	4	54	136	−82	5	
6	Mexico	6	1	0	1	4	52	138	−86	4	
7	Panama	6	0	0	0	6	26	175	−149	0	

Source: Pan American Water Polo Championship

20 November 2024; 17:00	Report	Canada	16–15 (PSO)	Argentina	Parque Deportivo, Ibagué
20 November 2024; 17:00	Report	Score by quarters: 2–3, 4–1, 2–4, 3–3 PSO: 5–4			Parque Deportivo, Ibagué
20 November 2024; 17:00	Report	three players 2	Goals	Galimberti 4	Parque Deportivo, Ibagué

20 November 2024; 18:30	Report	Brazil	32–4	Venezuela	Parque Deportivo, Ibagué
20 November 2024; 18:30	Report	Score by quarters: 6–0, 8–3, 9–1, 9–0			Parque Deportivo, Ibagué
20 November 2024; 18:30	Report	Coutinho, Pedroso 5	Goals	Botto 2	Parque Deportivo, Ibagué

20 November 2024; 20:00	Report	Panama	4–43	Colombia	Parque Deportivo, Ibagué
20 November 2024; 20:00	Report	Score by quarters: 2–10, 1–9, 1–11, 0–13			Parque Deportivo, Ibagué
20 November 2024; 20:00	Report	Baeza 3	Goals	Martinez 7	Parque Deportivo, Ibagué

21 November 2024; 08:00	Report	Argentina	29–3	Venezuela	Parque Deportivo, Ibagué
21 November 2024; 08:00	Report	Score by quarters: 7–0, 7–0, 9–2, 6–1			Parque Deportivo, Ibagué
21 November 2024; 08:00	Report	Camnasio 7	Goals	Perdomo 2	Parque Deportivo, Ibagué

21 November 2024; 09:30	Report	Canada	26–3	Panama	Parque Deportivo, Ibagué
21 November 2024; 09:30	Report	Score by quarters: 11–1, 7–1, 6–1, 2–0			Parque Deportivo, Ibagué
21 November 2024; 09:30	Report	Gerakoudis 6	Goals	three players 1	Parque Deportivo, Ibagué

21 November 2024; 11:00	Report	Mexico	2–34	Brazil	Parque Deportivo, Ibagué
21 November 2024; 11:00	Report	Score by quarters: 0–10, 2–10, 0–6, 0–8			Parque Deportivo, Ibagué
21 November 2024; 11:00	Report	Carrillo, Medina 1	Goals	Guimarães 6	Parque Deportivo, Ibagué

21 November 2024; 18:00	Report	Canada	29–3	Venezuela	Parque Deportivo, Ibagué
21 November 2024; 18:00	Report	Score by quarters: 7–0, 9–1, 8–0, 5–2			Parque Deportivo, Ibagué
21 November 2024; 18:00	Report	Gerakoudis, Lapins 6	Goals	three players 1	Parque Deportivo, Ibagué

21 November 2024; 19:30	Report	Panama	3–35	Brazil	Parque Deportivo, Ibagué
21 November 2024; 19:30	Report	Score by quarters: 1–11, 1–9, 0–8, 1–7			Parque Deportivo, Ibagué
21 November 2024; 19:30	Report	three players 1	Goals	Andrade 7	Parque Deportivo, Ibagué

21 November 2024; 21:00	Report	Colombia	27–6	Mexico	Parque Deportivo, Ibagué
21 November 2024; 21:00	Report	Score by quarters: 6–0, 7–2, 8–2, 6–2			Parque Deportivo, Ibagué
21 November 2024; 21:00	Report	Aramburu 5	Goals	Carrillo, Medina 2	Parque Deportivo, Ibagué

22 November 2024; 17:00	Report	Mexico	23–6	Panama	Parque Deportivo, Ibagué
22 November 2024; 17:00	Report	Score by quarters: 4–0, 3–2, 7–2, 9–2			Parque Deportivo, Ibagué
22 November 2024; 17:00	Report	Nazar 6	Goals	Salcedo 2	Parque Deportivo, Ibagué

22 November 2024; 18:30	Report	Argentina	14–15	Brazil	Parque Deportivo, Ibagué
22 November 2024; 18:30	Report	Score by quarters: 3–4, 4–4, 5–4, 2–3			Parque Deportivo, Ibagué
22 November 2024; 18:30	Report	four players 3	Goals	Camnasio 5	Parque Deportivo, Ibagué

22 November 2024; 20:00	Report	Colombia	24–3	Venezuela	Parque Deportivo, Ibagué
22 November 2024; 20:00	Report	Score by quarters: 7–0, 6–0, 5–3, 6–0			Parque Deportivo, Ibagué
22 November 2024; 20:00	Report	Zuluaga 6	Goals	three players 1	Parque Deportivo, Ibagué

23 November 2024; 17:00	Report	Venezuela	20–17 (PSO)	Mexico	Parque Deportivo, Ibagué
23 November 2024; 17:00	Report	Score by quarters: 2–3, 5–3, 4–6, 5–4 PSO: 4–1			Parque Deportivo, Ibagué
23 November 2024; 17:00	Report	Moray, Perdomo 5	Goals	Carrillo 7	Parque Deportivo, Ibagué

23 November 2024; 18:30	Report	Brazil	8–5	Canada	Parque Deportivo, Ibagué
23 November 2024; 18:30	Report	Score by quarters: 1–3, 2–0, 3–1, 2–1			Parque Deportivo, Ibagué
23 November 2024; 18:30	Report	three players 2	Goals	five players 1	Parque Deportivo, Ibagué

23 November 2024; 20:00	Report	Argentina	15–11	Colombia	Parque Deportivo, Ibagué
23 November 2024; 20:00	Report	Score by quarters: 3–2, 3–4, 4–3, 5–2			Parque Deportivo, Ibagué
23 November 2024; 20:00	Report	Veich 5	Goals	Zuluaga 3	Parque Deportivo, Ibagué

24 November 2024; 17:00	Report	Argentina	23–4	Panama	Parque Deportivo, Ibagué
24 November 2024; 17:00	Report	Score by quarters: 8–0, 5–0, 4–2, 6–2			Parque Deportivo, Ibagué
24 November 2024; 17:00	Report	Tilatti 5	Goals	Baeza 2	Parque Deportivo, Ibagué

24 November 2024; 18:30	Report	Mexico	3–30	Canada	Parque Deportivo, Ibagué
24 November 2024; 18:30	Report	Score by quarters: 1–5, 1–5, 0–8, 1–12			Parque Deportivo, Ibagué
24 November 2024; 18:30	Report	three players 1	Goals	Lapins 6	Parque Deportivo, Ibagué

24 November 2024; 20:00	Report	Colombia	11–19	Brazil	Parque Deportivo, Ibagué
24 November 2024; 20:00	Report	Score by quarters: 4–6, 3–5, 2–3, 2–5			Parque Deportivo, Ibagué
24 November 2024; 20:00	Report	Arbelaez 5	Goals	Guimarães 5	Parque Deportivo, Ibagué

25 November 2024; 14:00	Report	Venezuela	25–6	Panama	Parque Deportivo, Ibagué
25 November 2024; 14:00	Report	Score by quarters: 8–2, 8–2, 5–0, 4–2			Parque Deportivo, Ibagué
25 November 2024; 14:00	Report	Morillo, Perdomo 5	Goals	Chen 3	Parque Deportivo, Ibagué

25 November 2024; 15:30	Report	Mexico	2–25	Argentina	Parque Deportivo, Ibagué
25 November 2024; 15:30	Report	Score by quarters: 1–10, 0–8, 0–5, 1–2			Parque Deportivo, Ibagué
25 November 2024; 15:30	Report	Atilano, Medina 1	Goals	Galimberti 5	Parque Deportivo, Ibagué

25 November 2024; 17:00	Report	Canada	14–9	Colombia	Parque Deportivo, Ibagué
25 November 2024; 17:00	Report	Score by quarters: 6–1, 3–1, 2–2, 3–5			Parque Deportivo, Ibagué
25 November 2024; 17:00	Report	Gardijan, Soleimanipak 3	Goals	Arbelaez 3	Parque Deportivo, Ibagué

== Final rankings ==
Rank	Team
Gold medal	Brazil
Silver medal	Canada
Bronze medal	Argentina
4	Colombia
5	Venezuela
6	Mexico
7	Panama

Team Qualified for the 2025 World Championships
