= 2025 World Aquatics Men's Water Polo World Cup =

2025 FINA Men's Water Polo World Cup
- League: FINA Water Polo World Cup
- Sport: Water polo
- Duration: 18 December 2024 – 13 April 2025

Super Final
- Finals champions: Spain (2nd title)
- Runners-up: Greece

FINA Water Polo World Cup seasons
- ← 2023 2026 →

The 2025 Men's FINA Water Polo World Cup was the 18th edition of the tournament. It ran from 18 December 2024 to 13 April 2025.

Spain won the final against Greece to capture their second title.

== Format ==
There were two divisions. In Division 1 eleven teams and in Division 2 twelve teams played. The top-six teams of Division 1 and the top-two teams from Division 2 competed in the super final. A win gave a team three points, a win after penalties two, a loss after penalties one and a loss after regular time zero points.

== Division 1 ==
2025 World Aquatics Men's Water Polo World Cup
Tournament details
- Host country: Romania
- Venue: 1
- Dates: 6–12 January
- Teams: 11 (from 3 confederations)

Tournament statistics
- Matches played: 26
- Goals scored: 717 (27.58 per match)
- Top scorers: (Spain) Bernat Sanahuja (19 goals)

The draw was held on 31 October 2024. The tournament will be played in Bucharest, Romania between 6 and 12 January 2025. The top two of each group advance to the quarterfinals, with the top six finishers advancing to the super final. It was originally going to be held in Novi Sad, Serbia but for unknown reasons, it was changed to Romania's capital.

All times are local (UTC+2).

=== Group A ===
Pos	Team	Pld	W	PW	PL	L	GF	GA	GD	Pts	Qualification
1	Hungary	2	2	0	0	0	27	21	+6	6	Quarterfinals
2	Spain	2	1	0	0	1	24	23	+1	3	Crossovers
3	France	2	0	0	0	2	21	28	−7	0	Crossovers

Source: Worldcupwp2025
Rules for classification: 1) Points; 2) Head-to-head points; 3) Head-to-head goal difference; 4) Head-to-head goals scored; 5) Goal difference.

6 January 2025; 20:00	Report	Spain	11–12	Hungary	Swimming National Centre Otopeni, Bucharest; Referees: Georgios Stavridis (GRE), Ante Bura (CRO)
6 January 2025; 20:00	Report	Score by quarters: 3–4, 2–2, 1–4, 5–2			Swimming National Centre Otopeni, Bucharest; Referees: Georgios Stavridis (GRE), Ante Bura (CRO)
6 January 2025; 20:00	Report	Sanahuja 5	Goals	Manhercz 6	Swimming National Centre Otopeni, Bucharest; Referees: Georgios Stavridis (GRE), Ante Bura (CRO)

7 January 2025; 15:00	Report	Hungary	15–10	France	Swimming National Centre Otopeni, Bucharest; Referees: Boris Margeta (SLO), Levan Berishvili (GEO)
7 January 2025; 15:00	Report	Score by quarters: 1–3, 6–0, 3–3, 5–4			Swimming National Centre Otopeni, Bucharest; Referees: Boris Margeta (SLO), Levan Berishvili (GEO)
7 January 2025; 15:00	Report	Vigvári 5	Goals	three players 2	Swimming National Centre Otopeni, Bucharest; Referees: Boris Margeta (SLO), Levan Berishvili (GEO)

8 January 2025; 17:00	Report	France	11–13	Spain	Swimming National Centre Otopeni, Bucharest; Referees: Michiel Zwart (NED), Mihai Bălănescu (ROU)
8 January 2025; 17:00	Report	Score by quarters: 3–3, 4–3, 2–2, 2–5			Swimming National Centre Otopeni, Bucharest; Referees: Michiel Zwart (NED), Mihai Bălănescu (ROU)
8 January 2025; 17:00	Report	Vernoux 3	Goals	Sanahuja 4	Swimming National Centre Otopeni, Bucharest; Referees: Michiel Zwart (NED), Mihai Bălănescu (ROU)

=== Group B ===
Pos	Team	Pld	W	PW	PL	L	GF	GA	GD	Pts	Qualification
1	Greece	2	2	0	0	0	35	23	+12	6	Quarterfinals
2	Montenegro	2	1	0	0	1	26	33	−7	3	Crossovers
3	Serbia	2	0	0	0	2	28	33	−5	0	Crossovers

Source: Worldcupwp2025
Rules for classification: 1) Points; 2) Head-to-head points; 3) Head-to-head goal difference; 4) Head-to-head goals scored; 5) Goal difference.

7 January 2025; 16:30	Report	Montenegro	10–18	Greece	Swimming National Centre Otopeni, Bucharest; Referees: Julien Bourges (FRA), Michiel Zwart (NED)
7 January 2025; 16:30	Report	Score by quarters: 3–2, 3–7, 3–2, 1–7			Swimming National Centre Otopeni, Bucharest; Referees: Julien Bourges (FRA), Michiel Zwart (NED)
7 January 2025; 16:30	Report	three players 2	Goals	Argyropoulos 4	Swimming National Centre Otopeni, Bucharest; Referees: Julien Bourges (FRA), Michiel Zwart (NED)

8 January 2025; 09:00	Report	Greece	17–13	Serbia	Swimming National Centre Otopeni, Bucharest; Referees: Darren Spiritosanto (USA), Levan Berishvili (GEO)
8 January 2025; 09:00	Report	Score by quarters: 4–3, 3–4, 3–2, 6–4			Swimming National Centre Otopeni, Bucharest; Referees: Darren Spiritosanto (USA), Levan Berishvili (GEO)
8 January 2025; 09:00	Report	Kakaris 4	Goals	Martinović 5	Swimming National Centre Otopeni, Bucharest; Referees: Darren Spiritosanto (USA), Levan Berishvili (GEO)

8 January 2025; 18:30	Report	Serbia	15–16	Montenegro	Swimming National Centre Otopeni, Bucharest; Referees: Boris Margeta (SLO), Ante Bura (CRO)
8 January 2025; 18:30	Report	Score by quarters: 2–4, 2–5, 7–5, 4–2			Swimming National Centre Otopeni, Bucharest; Referees: Boris Margeta (SLO), Ante Bura (CRO)
8 January 2025; 18:30	Report	Gladović, Lukić 4	Goals	Moskov, Radović 3	Swimming National Centre Otopeni, Bucharest; Referees: Boris Margeta (SLO), Ante Bura (CRO)

=== Group C ===
Pos	Team	Pld	W	PW	PL	L	GF	GA	GD	Pts	Qualification
1	United States	2	2	0	0	0	29	24	+5	6	Quarterfinals
2	Japan	2	1	0	0	1	33	31	+2	3	Quarterfinals
3	Romania (H)	2	0	0	0	2	19	26	−7	0	Crossovers

Source: Worldcupwp2025
Rules for classification: 1) Points; 2) Head-to-head points; 3) Head-to-head goal difference; 4) Head-to-head goals scored; 5) Goal difference.
(H) Host

6 January 2025; 18:30	Report	Japan	17–19	United States	Swimming National Centre Otopeni, Bucharest; Referees: Tamás Kovács-Csatlós (HUN), Jaume Teixidó (ESP)
6 January 2025; 18:30	Report	Score by quarters: 2–6, 5–3, 6–4, 4–6			Swimming National Centre Otopeni, Bucharest; Referees: Tamás Kovács-Csatlós (HUN), Jaume Teixidó (ESP)
6 January 2025; 18:30	Report	five players 3	Goals	Irving 5	Swimming National Centre Otopeni, Bucharest; Referees: Tamás Kovács-Csatlós (HUN), Jaume Teixidó (ESP)

7 January 2025; 18:00	Report	United States	10–7	Romania	Swimming National Centre Otopeni, Bucharest; Referees: Siniša Matijašević (MNE), Vuk Milović (SRB)
7 January 2025; 18:00	Report	Score by quarters: 2–1, 2–2, 2–2, 4–2			Swimming National Centre Otopeni, Bucharest; Referees: Siniša Matijašević (MNE), Vuk Milović (SRB)
7 January 2025; 18:00	Report	Ohl 3	Goals	Vancsik 2	Swimming National Centre Otopeni, Bucharest; Referees: Siniša Matijašević (MNE), Vuk Milović (SRB)

8 January 2025; 20:00	Report	Romania	12–16	Japan	Swimming National Centre Otopeni, Bucharest; Referees: Georgios Stavridis (GRE), Vuk Milović (SRB)
8 January 2025; 20:00	Report	Score by quarters: 3–2, 3–6, 4–4, 2–4			Swimming National Centre Otopeni, Bucharest; Referees: Georgios Stavridis (GRE), Vuk Milović (SRB)
8 January 2025; 20:00	Report	Colodrovschi 5	Goals	Adachi 5	Swimming National Centre Otopeni, Bucharest; Referees: Georgios Stavridis (GRE), Vuk Milović (SRB)

=== Group D ===
Pos	Team	Pld	W	PW	PL	L	GF	GA	GD	Pts	Qualification
1	Croatia	1	1	0	0	0	13	11	+2	3	Quarterfinals
2	Georgia	1	0	0	0	1	11	13	−2	0	Crossovers

Source: Worldcupwp2025
Rules for classification: 1) Points; 2) Head-to-head points; 3) Head-to-head goal difference; 4) Head-to-head goals scored; 5) Goal difference.

7 January 2025; 19:30	Report	Croatia	13–11	Georgia	Swimming National Centre Otopeni, Bucharest; Referees: Darren Spiritosanto (USA), Chisato Kurosaki (JPN)
7 January 2025; 19:30	Report	Score by quarters: 2–5, 5–2, 4–2, 2–2			Swimming National Centre Otopeni, Bucharest; Referees: Darren Spiritosanto (USA), Chisato Kurosaki (JPN)
7 January 2025; 19:30	Report	Kharkov 5	Goals	three players 2	Swimming National Centre Otopeni, Bucharest; Referees: Darren Spiritosanto (USA), Chisato Kurosaki (JPN)

=== Classification round ===
Pos	Team	Pld	W	PW	PL	L	GF	GA	GD	Pts
9	Serbia	2	2	0	0	0	39	18	+21	6
10	Romania (H)	2	1	0	0	1	21	35	−14	3
11	France	2	0	0	0	2	26	33	−7	0

Source: Worldcupwp2025
Rules for classification: 1) Points; 2) Head-to-head points; 3) Head-to-head goal difference; 4) Head-to-head goals scored; 5) Goal difference.
(H) Host

10 January 2025; 13:00	Report	Serbia	21–6	Romania	Swimming National Centre Otopeni, Bucharest; Referees: Ante Bura (CRO), Jaume Teixidó (ESP)
10 January 2025; 13:00	Report	Score by quarters: 6–1, 2–2, 4–1, 9–2			Swimming National Centre Otopeni, Bucharest; Referees: Ante Bura (CRO), Jaume Teixidó (ESP)
10 January 2025; 13:00	Report	Radulović 6	Goals	Belényesi 2	Swimming National Centre Otopeni, Bucharest; Referees: Ante Bura (CRO), Jaume Teixidó (ESP)

11 January 2025; 13:00	Report	Serbia	18–12	France	Swimming National Centre Otopeni, Bucharest; Referees: Siniša Matijašević (MNE), Ante Bura (CRO)
11 January 2025; 13:00	Report	Score by quarters: 6–3, 5–4, 3–4, 4–1			Swimming National Centre Otopeni, Bucharest; Referees: Siniša Matijašević (MNE), Ante Bura (CRO)
11 January 2025; 13:00	Report	Martinović, Radulović 3	Goals	Bouet 4	Swimming National Centre Otopeni, Bucharest; Referees: Siniša Matijašević (MNE), Ante Bura (CRO)

12 January 2025; 13:00	Report	Romania	15–14	France	Swimming National Centre Otopeni, Bucharest; Referees: Levan Berishvili (GEO), Jaume Teixidó (ESP)
12 January 2025; 13:00	Report	Score by quarters: 4–2, 4–5, 3–4, 4–3			Swimming National Centre Otopeni, Bucharest; Referees: Levan Berishvili (GEO), Jaume Teixidó (ESP)
12 January 2025; 13:00	Report	Iudean 5	Goals	three players 3	Swimming National Centre Otopeni, Bucharest; Referees: Levan Berishvili (GEO), Jaume Teixidó (ESP)

=== Knockout stage ===
==== Bracket ====
Crossovers
9 January
Georgia	24
Romania	12
9 January
Montenegro	18
France	13
9 January
Spain	14
Serbia	9

Quarter-finals
10 January
Hungary	21
Georgia	10
10 January
Greece	20
Japan	16
10 January
United States	7
Montenegro	15
10 January
Croatia	14
Spain	15

Semi-finals
11 January
Hungary	20
Greece	10
11 January
Montenegro	8
Spain	15

Final
12 January
Hungary	9
Spain	15
Third place
12 January
Greece	17
Montenegro	10

Fifth place bracket

5–8th place semifinals
11 January
Georgia	18
Japan	19
11 January
United States	6
Croatia	15

Fifth place
12 January
Japan	8
Croatia	20
Seventh place
12 January
Georgia	17
United States	12

==== Crossovers ====
9 January 2025; 16:00	Report	Spain	14–9	Serbia	Swimming National Centre Otopeni, Bucharest; Referees: Siniša Matijašević (MNE), Chisato Kurosaki (JPN)
9 January 2025; 16:00	Report	Score by quarters: 3–2, 3–1, 5–2, 3–4			Swimming National Centre Otopeni, Bucharest; Referees: Siniša Matijašević (MNE), Chisato Kurosaki (JPN)
9 January 2025; 16:00	Report	Sanahuja 5	Goals	Lukić 5	Swimming National Centre Otopeni, Bucharest; Referees: Siniša Matijašević (MNE), Chisato Kurosaki (JPN)

9 January 2025; 17:30	Report	Montenegro	18–13	France	Swimming National Centre Otopeni, Bucharest; Referees: Georgios Stavridis (GRE), Tamás Kovács-Csatlós (HUN)
9 January 2025; 17:30	Report	Score by quarters: 3–4, 6–3, 4–5, 5–1			Swimming National Centre Otopeni, Bucharest; Referees: Georgios Stavridis (GRE), Tamás Kovács-Csatlós (HUN)
9 January 2025; 17:30	Report	Ćetković, Gardašević 5	Goals	Bouet 3	Swimming National Centre Otopeni, Bucharest; Referees: Georgios Stavridis (GRE), Tamás Kovács-Csatlós (HUN)

9 January 2025; 19:00	Report	Georgia	24–12	Romania	Swimming National Centre Otopeni, Bucharest; Referees: Jaume Teixidó (ESP), Julien Bourges (FRA)
9 January 2025; 19:00	Report	Score by quarters: 6–2, 6–7, 3–2, 9–1			Swimming National Centre Otopeni, Bucharest; Referees: Jaume Teixidó (ESP), Julien Bourges (FRA)
9 January 2025; 19:00	Report	Akhvlediani 8	Goals	Georgescu 5	Swimming National Centre Otopeni, Bucharest; Referees: Jaume Teixidó (ESP), Julien Bourges (FRA)

==== Quarterfinals ====
10 January 2025; 14:30	Report	Hungary	21–10	Georgia	Swimming National Centre Otopeni, Bucharest; Referees: Darren Spiritosanto (USA), Vuk Milović (SRB)
10 January 2025; 14:30	Report	Score by quarters: 6–2, 4–1, 5–1, 6–6			Swimming National Centre Otopeni, Bucharest; Referees: Darren Spiritosanto (USA), Vuk Milović (SRB)
10 January 2025; 14:30	Report	Ekler 5	Goals	Pjesivac, Shushiashvili 3	Swimming National Centre Otopeni, Bucharest; Referees: Darren Spiritosanto (USA), Vuk Milović (SRB)

10 January 2025; 16:00	Report	Greece	20–16	Japan	Swimming National Centre Otopeni, Bucharest; Referees: Boris Margeta (SLO), Levan Berishvili (GEO)
10 January 2025; 16:00	Report	Score by quarters: 5–5, 4–5, 7–1, 4–5			Swimming National Centre Otopeni, Bucharest; Referees: Boris Margeta (SLO), Levan Berishvili (GEO)
10 January 2025; 16:00	Report	three players 4	Goals	Inaba 6	Swimming National Centre Otopeni, Bucharest; Referees: Boris Margeta (SLO), Levan Berishvili (GEO)

10 January 2025; 17:30	Report	United States	7–15	Montenegro	Swimming National Centre Otopeni, Bucharest; Referees: Georgios Stavridis (GRE), Mihai Bălănescu (ROU)
10 January 2025; 17:30	Report	Score by quarters: 1–5, 2–3, 1–3, 3–4			Swimming National Centre Otopeni, Bucharest; Referees: Georgios Stavridis (GRE), Mihai Bălănescu (ROU)
10 January 2025; 17:30	Report	Ohl 3	Goals	Moskov 4	Swimming National Centre Otopeni, Bucharest; Referees: Georgios Stavridis (GRE), Mihai Bălănescu (ROU)

10 January 2025; 19:00	Report	Croatia	14–15	Spain	Swimming National Centre Otopeni, Bucharest; Referees: Michiel Zwart (NED), Tamás Kovács-Csatlós (HUN)
10 January 2025; 19:00	Report	Score by quarters: 3–5, 5–4, 2–3, 4–3			Swimming National Centre Otopeni, Bucharest; Referees: Michiel Zwart (NED), Tamás Kovács-Csatlós (HUN)
10 January 2025; 19:00	Report	Kharkov 3	Goals	Biel, Valls 4	Swimming National Centre Otopeni, Bucharest; Referees: Michiel Zwart (NED), Tamás Kovács-Csatlós (HUN)

==== 5–8th place semifinals ====
11 January 2025; 14:30	Report	Georgia	18–19	Japan	Swimming National Centre Otopeni, Bucharest; Referees: Jaume Teixidó (ESP), Julien Bourges (FRA)
11 January 2025; 14:30	Report	Score by quarters: 1–3, 7–5, 4–6, 6–5			Swimming National Centre Otopeni, Bucharest; Referees: Jaume Teixidó (ESP), Julien Bourges (FRA)
11 January 2025; 14:30	Report	Akhvlediani, Pjesivac 4	Goals	Inaba 4	Swimming National Centre Otopeni, Bucharest; Referees: Jaume Teixidó (ESP), Julien Bourges (FRA)

11 January 2025; 16:00	Report	United States	6–15	Croatia	Swimming National Centre Otopeni, Bucharest; Referees: Georgios Stavridis (GRE), Tamás Kovács-Csatlós (HUN)
11 January 2025; 16:00	Report	Score by quarters: 3–7, 0–3, 1–2, 2–3			Swimming National Centre Otopeni, Bucharest; Referees: Georgios Stavridis (GRE), Tamás Kovács-Csatlós (HUN)
11 January 2025; 16:00	Report	six players 1	Goals	Marinić Kragić 4	Swimming National Centre Otopeni, Bucharest; Referees: Georgios Stavridis (GRE), Tamás Kovács-Csatlós (HUN)

==== Semifinals ====
11 January 2025; 17:30	Report	Hungary	20–10	Greece	Swimming National Centre Otopeni, Bucharest; Referees: Michiel Zwart (NED), Chisato Kurosaki (JPN)
11 January 2025; 17:30	Report	Score by quarters: 5–3, 5–3, 4–2, 6–2			Swimming National Centre Otopeni, Bucharest; Referees: Michiel Zwart (NED), Chisato Kurosaki (JPN)
11 January 2025; 17:30	Report	four players 3	Goals	ten players 1	Swimming National Centre Otopeni, Bucharest; Referees: Michiel Zwart (NED), Chisato Kurosaki (JPN)

11 January 2025; 19:00	Report	Montenegro	8–15	Spain	Swimming National Centre Otopeni, Bucharest; Referees: Boris Margeta (SLO), Darren Spiritosanto (USA)
11 January 2025; 19:00	Report	Score by quarters: 2–4, 0–2, 1–5, 5–4			Swimming National Centre Otopeni, Bucharest; Referees: Boris Margeta (SLO), Darren Spiritosanto (USA)
11 January 2025; 19:00	Report	Ćetković, Perković 2	Goals	Daura 5	Swimming National Centre Otopeni, Bucharest; Referees: Boris Margeta (SLO), Darren Spiritosanto (USA)

==== Seventh place game ====
12 January 2025; 14:30	Report	Georgia	17–12	United States	Swimming National Centre Otopeni, Bucharest; Referees: Ante Bura (CRO), Chisato Kurosaki (JPN)
12 January 2025; 14:30	Report	Score by quarters: 5–4, 4–3, 3–2, 5–3			Swimming National Centre Otopeni, Bucharest; Referees: Ante Bura (CRO), Chisato Kurosaki (JPN)
12 January 2025; 14:30	Report	three players 3	Goals	Ohl 4	Swimming National Centre Otopeni, Bucharest; Referees: Ante Bura (CRO), Chisato Kurosaki (JPN)

==== Fifth place game ====
12 January 2025; 16:00	Report	Japan	8–20	Croatia	Swimming National Centre Otopeni, Bucharest; Referees: Siniša Matijašević (MNE), Mihai Bălănescu (ROU)
12 January 2025; 16:00	Report	Score by quarters: 2–3, 2–5, 1–5, 3–7			Swimming National Centre Otopeni, Bucharest; Referees: Siniša Matijašević (MNE), Mihai Bălănescu (ROU)
12 January 2025; 16:00	Report	Watanabe 3	Goals	Kharkov, Marinić Kragić 4	Swimming National Centre Otopeni, Bucharest; Referees: Siniša Matijašević (MNE), Mihai Bălănescu (ROU)

==== Third place game ====
12 January 2025; 17:30	Report	Greece	17–10	Montenegro	Swimming National Centre Otopeni, Bucharest; Referees: Julien Bourges (FRA), Tamás Kovács-Csatlós (HUN)
12 January 2025; 17:30	Report	Score by quarters: 3–2, 7–1, 4–3, 3–4			Swimming National Centre Otopeni, Bucharest; Referees: Julien Bourges (FRA), Tamás Kovács-Csatlós (HUN)
12 January 2025; 17:30	Report	Argyropoulos, Kalogeropoulos 4	Goals	Matković 4	Swimming National Centre Otopeni, Bucharest; Referees: Julien Bourges (FRA), Tamás Kovács-Csatlós (HUN)

==== Final ====
12 January 2025; 19:00	Report	Hungary	9–15	Spain	Swimming National Centre Otopeni, Bucharest; Referees: Darren Spiritosanto (USA), Vuk Milović (SRB)
12 January 2025; 19:00	Report	Score by quarters: 1–4, 1–4, 2–3, 5–4			Swimming National Centre Otopeni, Bucharest; Referees: Darren Spiritosanto (USA), Vuk Milović (SRB)
12 January 2025; 19:00	Report	three players 2	Goals	Granados 8	Swimming National Centre Otopeni, Bucharest; Referees: Darren Spiritosanto (USA), Vuk Milović (SRB)

== Division 2 ==
2025 World Aquatics Men's Water Polo World Cup
Tournament details
- Host country: Turkey
- Venue: 1
- Dates: 18–21 December
- Teams: 12 (from 3 confederations)

Tournament statistics
- Matches played: 28
- Goals scored: 772 (27.57 per match)
- Top scorers: (Turkey) Selçuk Caner (25 goals)

The draw was held on 31 October 2024. The tournament was played in Istanbul, Turkey between 18 and 21 December 2024. The top two of each group advanced to the quarterfinals and the top-two finishers of the tournament will play in the super final.

All times are local (UTC+3).

=== Group A ===
Pos	Team	Pld	W	PW	PL	L	GF	GA	GD	Pts	Qualification
1	Iran	2	2	0	0	0	37	18	+19	6	Quarterfinals
2	Ukraine (Note: Ukraine replaced Kazakhstan.)	2	1	0	0	1	33	24	+9	3	Quarterfinals
3	South Africa	2	0	0	0	2	12	40	−28	0	

Source: Worldcupwp2025
Rules for classification: 1) Points; 2) Head-to-head points; 3) Head-to-head goal difference; 4) Head-to-head goals scored; 5) Goal difference.
Notes:

18 December 2024; 09:00	Report	South Africa	4–21	Iran	Maltepe University, Istanbul; Referees: Hendrik Schopp (GER), Âkif Uz (TUR)
18 December 2024; 09:00	Report	Score by quarters: 0–8, 1–3, 2–5, 1–5			Maltepe University, Istanbul; Referees: Hendrik Schopp (GER), Âkif Uz (TUR)
18 December 2024; 09:00	Report	four players 1	Goals	Yazdankhah 6	Maltepe University, Istanbul; Referees: Hendrik Schopp (GER), Âkif Uz (TUR)

18 December 2024; 16:00	Report	Iran	16–14	Ukraine	Maltepe University, Istanbul; Referees: Ruben Sap (NED), Peter Radič (SVK)
18 December 2024; 16:00	Report	Score by quarters: 4–6, 4–4, 4–2, 4–2			Maltepe University, Istanbul; Referees: Ruben Sap (NED), Peter Radič (SVK)
18 December 2024; 16:00	Report	Mehri 4	Goals	Veklyuk 8	Maltepe University, Istanbul; Referees: Ruben Sap (NED), Peter Radič (SVK)

19 December 2024; 10:00	Report	Ukraine	19–8	South Africa	Maltepe University, Istanbul; Referees: Jeremy Cheng (SGP), Âkif Uz (TUR)
19 December 2024; 10:00	Report	Score by quarters: 5–2, 7–1, 3–2, 4–3			Maltepe University, Istanbul; Referees: Jeremy Cheng (SGP), Âkif Uz (TUR)
19 December 2024; 10:00	Report	Rakitin 6	Goals	D. Sneddon 3	Maltepe University, Istanbul; Referees: Jeremy Cheng (SGP), Âkif Uz (TUR)

=== Group B ===
Pos	Team	Pld	W	PW	PL	L	GF	GA	GD	Pts	Qualification
1	China	2	2	0	0	0	32	21	+11	6	Quarterfinals
2	Portugal	2	1	0	0	1	29	23	+6	3	Quarterfinals
3	Great Britain	2	0	0	0	2	20	37	−17	0	

Source: Worldcupwp2025
Rules for classification: 1) Points; 2) Head-to-head points; 3) Head-to-head goal difference; 4) Head-to-head goals scored; 5) Goal difference.

18 December 2024; 10:30	Report	Portugal	18–10	Great Britain	Maltepe University, Istanbul; Referees: Ruben Sap (NED), Stefan Licari (MLT)
18 December 2024; 10:30	Report	Score by quarters: 5–4, 3–0, 4–5, 6–1			Maltepe University, Istanbul; Referees: Ruben Sap (NED), Stefan Licari (MLT)
18 December 2024; 10:30	Report	Martins 7	Goals	K. Powell 5	Maltepe University, Istanbul; Referees: Ruben Sap (NED), Stefan Licari (MLT)

18 December 2024; 17:00	Report	Great Britain	10–19	China	Maltepe University, Istanbul; Referees: Jeremy Cheng (SGP), Stefan Licari (MLT)
18 December 2024; 17:00	Report	Score by quarters: 3–6, 3–5, 2–4, 2–4			Maltepe University, Istanbul; Referees: Jeremy Cheng (SGP), Stefan Licari (MLT)
18 December 2024; 17:00	Report	R. Powell 4	Goals	Chen Z. 5	Maltepe University, Istanbul; Referees: Jeremy Cheng (SGP), Stefan Licari (MLT)

19 December 2024; 11:30	Report	China	13–11	Portugal	Maltepe University, Istanbul; Referees: Alessia Ferrari (ITA), Hendrik Schopp (GER)
19 December 2024; 11:30	Report	Score by quarters: 6–3, 3–2, 2–5, 2–1			Maltepe University, Istanbul; Referees: Alessia Ferrari (ITA), Hendrik Schopp (GER)
19 December 2024; 11:30	Report	Chen Z. 6	Goals	four players 2	Maltepe University, Istanbul; Referees: Alessia Ferrari (ITA), Hendrik Schopp (GER)

=== Group C ===
Pos	Team	Pld	W	PW	PL	L	GF	GA	GD	Pts	Qualification
1	Germany	2	2	0	0	0	39	17	+22	6	Quarterfinals
2	Malta	2	1	0	0	1	35	22	+13	3	Quarterfinals
3	Singapore	2	0	0	0	2	10	45	−35	0	

Source: Worldcupwp2025
Rules for classification: 1) Points; 2) Head-to-head points; 3) Head-to-head goal difference; 4) Head-to-head goals scored; 5) Goal difference.

18 December 2024; 12:00	Report	Malta	21–7	Singapore	Maltepe University, Istanbul; Referees: Yang Pang (CHN), Warren Beuster (RSA)
18 December 2024; 12:00	Report	Score by quarters: 3–1, 6–2, 6–3, 6–1			Maltepe University, Istanbul; Referees: Yang Pang (CHN), Warren Beuster (RSA)
18 December 2024; 12:00	Report	Camilleri 4	Goals	C. Loh 3	Maltepe University, Istanbul; Referees: Yang Pang (CHN), Warren Beuster (RSA)

18 December 2024; 20:30	Report	Singapore	3–24	Germany	Maltepe University, Istanbul; Referees: Eurico Silva (POR), Babak Hesamian (IRI)
18 December 2024; 20:30	Report	Score by quarters: 0–5, 1–6, 1–5, 1–8			Maltepe University, Istanbul; Referees: Eurico Silva (POR), Babak Hesamian (IRI)
18 December 2024; 20:30	Report	three players 1	Goals	Schipper 7	Maltepe University, Istanbul; Referees: Eurico Silva (POR), Babak Hesamian (IRI)

19 December 2024; 13:00	Report	Germany	15–14	Malta	Maltepe University, Istanbul; Referees: Maxim Gerasimov (GBR), Babak Hesamian (IRI)
19 December 2024; 13:00	Report	Score by quarters: 5–3, 3–3, 3–5, 4–3			Maltepe University, Istanbul; Referees: Maxim Gerasimov (GBR), Babak Hesamian (IRI)
19 December 2024; 13:00	Report	Bozic, Strelezkij 3	Goals	Camilleri 5	Maltepe University, Istanbul; Referees: Maxim Gerasimov (GBR), Babak Hesamian (IRI)

=== Group D ===
Pos	Team	Pld	W	PW	PL	L	GF	GA	GD	Pts	Qualification
1	Netherlands	2	2	0	0	0	37	28	+9	6	Quarterfinals
2	Slovakia	2	1	0	0	1	32	38	−6	3	Quarterfinals
3	Turkey (H)	2	0	0	0	2	32	35	−3	0	

Source: Worldcupwp2025
Rules for classification: 1) Points; 2) Head-to-head points; 3) Head-to-head goal difference; 4) Head-to-head goals scored; 5) Goal difference.
(H) Host

18 December 2024; 13:30	Report	Netherlands	21–13	Slovakia	Maltepe University, Istanbul; Referees: Spyridon Achladiotis (GRE), Anna Goncharenko (UKR)
18 December 2024; 13:30	Report	Score by quarters: 6–6, 6–2, 5–2, 4–3			Maltepe University, Istanbul; Referees: Spyridon Achladiotis (GRE), Anna Goncharenko (UKR)
18 December 2024; 13:30	Report	Ten Broek 5	Goals	three players 3	Maltepe University, Istanbul; Referees: Spyridon Achladiotis (GRE), Anna Goncharenko (UKR)

18 December 2024; 19:00	Report	Slovakia	19–17	Turkey	Maltepe University, Istanbul; Referees: Alessia Ferrari (ITA), Maxim Gerasimov (GBR)
18 December 2024; 19:00	Report	Score by quarters: 5–5, 5–7, 4–3, 5–2			Maltepe University, Istanbul; Referees: Alessia Ferrari (ITA), Maxim Gerasimov (GBR)
18 December 2024; 19:00	Report	Tkáč 7	Goals	Caner 7	Maltepe University, Istanbul; Referees: Alessia Ferrari (ITA), Maxim Gerasimov (GBR)

19 December 2024; 14:30	Report	Turkey	15–16	Netherlands	Maltepe University, Istanbul; Referees: Spyridon Achladiotis (GRE), Eurico Silva (POR)
19 December 2024; 14:30	Report	Score by quarters: 5–4, 3–4, 3–2, 4–6			Maltepe University, Istanbul; Referees: Spyridon Achladiotis (GRE), Eurico Silva (POR)
19 December 2024; 14:30	Report	Caner 4	Goals	S. Hessels, Te Riele 5	Maltepe University, Istanbul; Referees: Spyridon Achladiotis (GRE), Eurico Silva (POR)

=== Knockout stage ===
==== Bracket ====
Quarter-finals
20 December
Iran	15
Portugal	11
20 December
Netherlands	18
Malta	14
20 December
China	17
Ukraine	11
20 December
Germany	17
Slovakia	11

Semi-finals
21 December
Iran	7
Netherlands	18
21 December
China	9
Germany	20

Final
21 December
Netherlands	11
Germany	9
Third place
21 December
Iran	11
China	12

Fifth place bracket

5–8th place semifinals
21 December
Portugal	9
Malta	10
21 December
Ukraine	14
Slovakia	20

Fifth place
21 December
Malta	15
Slovakia	14
Seventh place
21 December
Portugal	17
Ukraine	11

Ninth place bracket

9–12th place semifinals
19 December
South Africa	9
Great Britain	15
19 December
Singapore	10
Turkey	26

Ninth place
20 December
Great Britain	7
Turkey	14
Eleventh place
20 December
South Africa	9
Singapore	13

==== Quarterfinals ====
20 December 2024; 16:00	Report	Iran	15–11	Portugal	Maltepe University, Istanbul; Referees: Hendrik Schopp (GER), Maxim Gerasimov (GBR)
20 December 2024; 16:00	Report	Score by quarters: 1–1, 4–4, 8–3, 2–3			Maltepe University, Istanbul; Referees: Hendrik Schopp (GER), Maxim Gerasimov (GBR)
20 December 2024; 16:00	Report	Behzadsabouri, Mehri 3	Goals	Martins 4	Maltepe University, Istanbul; Referees: Hendrik Schopp (GER), Maxim Gerasimov (GBR)

20 December 2024; 17:30	Report	China	17–11	Ukraine	Maltepe University, Istanbul; Referees: Spyridon Achladiotis (GRE), Jeremy Cheng (SGP)
20 December 2024; 17:30	Report	Score by quarters: 5–4, 4–2, 6–1, 2–4			Maltepe University, Istanbul; Referees: Spyridon Achladiotis (GRE), Jeremy Cheng (SGP)
20 December 2024; 17:30	Report	Chen Y., Chen Z. 4	Goals	Veklyuk 4	Maltepe University, Istanbul; Referees: Spyridon Achladiotis (GRE), Jeremy Cheng (SGP)

20 December 2024; 19:00	Report	Germany	17–11	Slovakia	Maltepe University, Istanbul; Referees: Ruben Sap (NED), Stefan Licari (MLT)
20 December 2024; 19:00	Report	Score by quarters: 4–3, 4–1, 3–3, 6–4			Maltepe University, Istanbul; Referees: Ruben Sap (NED), Stefan Licari (MLT)
20 December 2024; 19:00	Report	Hofmann 4	Goals	Ďurík 3	Maltepe University, Istanbul; Referees: Ruben Sap (NED), Stefan Licari (MLT)

20 December 2024; 20:30	Report	Netherlands	18–14	Malta	Maltepe University, Istanbul; Referees: Alessia Ferrari (ITA), Âkif Uz (TUR)
20 December 2024; 20:30	Report	Score by quarters: 7–4, 2–3, 7–3, 2–4			Maltepe University, Istanbul; Referees: Alessia Ferrari (ITA), Âkif Uz (TUR)
20 December 2024; 20:30	Report	Van der Weijden 5	Goals	three players 3	Maltepe University, Istanbul; Referees: Alessia Ferrari (ITA), Âkif Uz (TUR)

==== 9–12th place semifinals ====
19 December 2024; 18:00	Report	South Africa	9–15	Great Britain	Maltepe University, Istanbul; Referees: Ruben Sap (NED), Anna Goncharenko (UKR)
19 December 2024; 18:00	Report	Score by quarters: 2–0, 3–5, 2–4, 2–6			Maltepe University, Istanbul; Referees: Ruben Sap (NED), Anna Goncharenko (UKR)
19 December 2024; 18:00	Report	Watt 3	Goals	Gilmour 4	Maltepe University, Istanbul; Referees: Ruben Sap (NED), Anna Goncharenko (UKR)

19 December 2024; 19:30	Report	Singapore	10–26	Turkey	Maltepe University, Istanbul; Referees: Yang Pang (CHN), Peter Radič (SVK)
19 December 2024; 19:30	Report	Score by quarters: 0–9, 3–6, 1–4, 6–7			Maltepe University, Istanbul; Referees: Yang Pang (CHN), Peter Radič (SVK)
19 December 2024; 19:30	Report	three players 2	Goals	Caner 10	Maltepe University, Istanbul; Referees: Yang Pang (CHN), Peter Radič (SVK)

==== 5–8th place semifinals ====
21 December 2024; 09:00	Report	Portugal	9–10	Malta	Maltepe University, Istanbul; Referees: Ruben Sap (NED), Jeremy Cheng (SGP)
21 December 2024; 09:00	Report	Score by quarters: 4–2, 3–2, 2–5, 1–1			Maltepe University, Istanbul; Referees: Ruben Sap (NED), Jeremy Cheng (SGP)
21 December 2024; 09:00	Report	three players 2	Goals	Camilleri 3	Maltepe University, Istanbul; Referees: Ruben Sap (NED), Jeremy Cheng (SGP)

21 December 2024; 10:30	Report	Ukraine	14–20	Slovakia	Maltepe University, Istanbul; Referees: Hendrik Schopp (GER), Yang Pang (CHN)
21 December 2024; 10:30	Report	Score by quarters: 1–4, 5–3, 5–8, 3–5			Maltepe University, Istanbul; Referees: Hendrik Schopp (GER), Yang Pang (CHN)
21 December 2024; 10:30	Report	Gusakov 6	Goals	Baláž, Furman 6	Maltepe University, Istanbul; Referees: Hendrik Schopp (GER), Yang Pang (CHN)

==== Semifinals ====
21 December 2024; 12:00	Report	Iran	7–18	Netherlands	Maltepe University, Istanbul; Referees: Alessia Ferrari (ITA), Maxim Gerasimov (GBR)
21 December 2024; 12:00	Report	Score by quarters: 3–6, 2–4, 1–5, 1–3			Maltepe University, Istanbul; Referees: Alessia Ferrari (ITA), Maxim Gerasimov (GBR)
21 December 2024; 12:00	Report	Mehri 3	Goals	Ten Broek 5	Maltepe University, Istanbul; Referees: Alessia Ferrari (ITA), Maxim Gerasimov (GBR)

21 December 2024; 13:30	Report	China	9–20	Germany	Maltepe University, Istanbul; Referees: Spyridon Achladiotis (GRE), Âkif Uz (TUR)
21 December 2024; 13:30	Report	Score by quarters: 4–6, 2–6, 3–4, 0–4			Maltepe University, Istanbul; Referees: Spyridon Achladiotis (GRE), Âkif Uz (TUR)
21 December 2024; 13:30	Report	Chen Z. 4	Goals	Bozic, Gansen 4	Maltepe University, Istanbul; Referees: Spyridon Achladiotis (GRE), Âkif Uz (TUR)

==== Eleventh place game ====
20 December 2024; 14:30	Report	South Africa	9–13	Singapore	Maltepe University, Istanbul; Referees: Peter Radič (SVK), Anna Goncharenko (UKR)
20 December 2024; 14:30	Report	Score by quarters: 1–4, 1–2, 5–4, 2–3			Maltepe University, Istanbul; Referees: Peter Radič (SVK), Anna Goncharenko (UKR)
20 December 2024; 14:30	Report	R. Sneddon 3	Goals	six players 2	Maltepe University, Istanbul; Referees: Peter Radič (SVK), Anna Goncharenko (UKR)

==== Ninth place game ====
20 December 2024; 13:00	Report	Great Britain	7–14	Turkey	Maltepe University, Istanbul; Referees: Eurico Silva (POR), Warren Beuster (RSA)
20 December 2024; 13:00	Report	Score by quarters: 1–4, 1–1, 2–3, 3–6			Maltepe University, Istanbul; Referees: Eurico Silva (POR), Warren Beuster (RSA)
20 December 2024; 13:00	Report	K. Powell 4	Goals	Caner, Destici 4	Maltepe University, Istanbul; Referees: Eurico Silva (POR), Warren Beuster (RSA)

==== Seventh place game ====
21 December 2024; 16:00	Report	Portugal	17–11	Ukraine	Maltepe University, Istanbul; Referees: Warren Beuster (RSA), Babak Hesamian (IRI)
21 December 2024; 16:00	Report	Score by quarters: 1–0, 6–3, 6–6, 4–2			Maltepe University, Istanbul; Referees: Warren Beuster (RSA), Babak Hesamian (IRI)
21 December 2024; 16:00	Report	Rocha 3	Goals	four players 2	Maltepe University, Istanbul; Referees: Warren Beuster (RSA), Babak Hesamian (IRI)

==== Fifth place game ====
21 December 2024; 17:30	Report	Malta	15–14	Slovakia	Maltepe University, Istanbul; Referees: Anna Goncharenko (UKR), Eurico Silva (POR)
21 December 2024; 17:30	Report	Score by quarters: 3–0, 7–7, 3–5, 2–2			Maltepe University, Istanbul; Referees: Anna Goncharenko (UKR), Eurico Silva (POR)
21 December 2024; 17:30	Report	Cutajar 5	Goals	Bielik 5	Maltepe University, Istanbul; Referees: Anna Goncharenko (UKR), Eurico Silva (POR)

==== Third place game ====
21 December 2024; 19:00	Report	Iran	11–12	China	Maltepe University, Istanbul; Referees: Peter Radič (SVK), Stefan Licari (MLT)
21 December 2024; 19:00	Report	Score by quarters: 2–3, 2–4, 4–1, 3–4			Maltepe University, Istanbul; Referees: Peter Radič (SVK), Stefan Licari (MLT)
21 December 2024; 19:00	Report	Ghavidel 4	Goals	Chen Y. 4	Maltepe University, Istanbul; Referees: Peter Radič (SVK), Stefan Licari (MLT)

==== Final ====
21 December 2024; 20:30	Report	Netherlands	11–9	Germany	Maltepe University, Istanbul; Referees: Âkif Uz (TUR), Maxim Gerasimov (GBR)
21 December 2024; 20:30	Report	Score by quarters: 3–0, 3–4, 4–4, 1–1			Maltepe University, Istanbul; Referees: Âkif Uz (TUR), Maxim Gerasimov (GBR)
21 December 2024; 20:30	Report	Van der Weijden 5	Goals	Hofmann 4	Maltepe University, Istanbul; Referees: Âkif Uz (TUR), Maxim Gerasimov (GBR)

== Super final ==
2025 World Aquatics Men's Water Polo World Cup
Tournament details
- Host country: Montenegro
- Venue: 1
- Dates: 11–13 April
- Teams: 8

Final positions
- Champions: Spain
- Runners-up: Greece
- Third place: Hungary
- Fourth place: Croatia

Tournament statistics
- Matches played: 12
- Goals scored: 364 (30.33 per match)
- Top scorers: (Spain) Álvaro Granados (17 goals)

The tournament took place between 11 and 13 April 2025 in Podgorica, Montenegro.

=== Venue ===
Originally, venues in Budva and Kotor were earmarked to organise the event, however, this was changed and the event was held at the Morača Sports Center in Montenegro's capital, Podgorica.

2025 World Aquatics Men's Water Polo World Cup is located in Montenegro	Podgorica
2025 World Aquatics Men's Water Polo World Cup is located in Montenegro	Morača Sports Center
2025 World Aquatics Men's Water Polo World Cup is located in Montenegro	Capacity: 6,000

=== Bracket ===
Quarter-finals
11 April
Hungary	21
Netherlands	11
11 April
Greece	20
Japan	10
11 April
Spain	22
Germany	9
11 April
Montenegro	11
Croatia	12

Semi-finals
12 April
Hungary	14
Greece	18
12 April
Spain	19
Croatia	14

Final
13 April
Greece	14
Spain	16
Third place
13 April
Hungary (PSO)	14 (4)
Croatia	14 (3)

Fifth place bracket

5–8th place semifinals
12 April
Netherlands	20
Japan	15
12 April
Germany	15
Montenegro	19

Fifth place
13 April
Netherlands	14
Montenegro	15
Seventh place
13 April
Japan	11
Germany	16

=== Quarterfinals ===
All times are local (UTC+2).

11 April 2025; 14:00	Report	Spain	22–9	Germany	Morača Sports Center, Podgorica; Referees: György Kun (HUN), Chisato Kurosaki (JPN)
11 April 2025; 14:00	Report	Score by quarters: 4–2, 7–3, 4–2, 7–2			Morača Sports Center, Podgorica; Referees: György Kun (HUN), Chisato Kurosaki (JPN)
11 April 2025; 14:00	Report	Granados 6	Goals	Bozic 3	Morača Sports Center, Podgorica; Referees: György Kun (HUN), Chisato Kurosaki (JPN)

11 April 2025; 16:10	Report	Hungary	21–11	Netherlands	Morača Sports Center, Podgorica; Referees: Božo Đurašković (MNE), Tomislav Copić (CRO)
11 April 2025; 16:10	Report	Score by quarters: 6–4, 5–2, 6–2, 4–3			Morača Sports Center, Podgorica; Referees: Božo Đurašković (MNE), Tomislav Copić (CRO)
11 April 2025; 16:10	Report	four players 3	Goals	Ten Broek 3	Morača Sports Center, Podgorica; Referees: Božo Đurašković (MNE), Tomislav Copić (CRO)

11 April 2025; 18:20	Report	Greece	20–10	Japan	Morača Sports Center, Podgorica; Referees: Xevi Buch (ESP), Gernot Häntschel (GER)
11 April 2025; 18:20	Report	Score by quarters: 7–4, 3–3, 4–2, 6–1			Morača Sports Center, Podgorica; Referees: Xevi Buch (ESP), Gernot Häntschel (GER)
11 April 2025; 18:20	Report	Argyropoulos, Kalogeropoulos 4	Goals	Watanabe 5	Morača Sports Center, Podgorica; Referees: Xevi Buch (ESP), Gernot Häntschel (GER)

11 April 2025; 20:30	Report	Montenegro	11–12	Croatia	Morača Sports Center, Podgorica; Referees: Raffaele Colombo (ITA), Andreja Stanojević (SRB)
11 April 2025; 20:30	Report	Score by quarters: 1–2, 5–2, 3–4, 2–4			Morača Sports Center, Podgorica; Referees: Raffaele Colombo (ITA), Andreja Stanojević (SRB)
11 April 2025; 20:30	Report	Matković 3	Goals	Fatović 6	Morača Sports Center, Podgorica; Referees: Raffaele Colombo (ITA), Andreja Stanojević (SRB)

=== 5–8th place semifinals ===
12 April 2025; 14:00	Report	Netherlands	20–15	Japan	Morača Sports Center, Podgorica; Referees: György Kun (HUN), Xevi Buch (ESP)
12 April 2025; 14:00	Report	Score by quarters: 6–2, 3–5, 7–4, 4–4			Morača Sports Center, Podgorica; Referees: György Kun (HUN), Xevi Buch (ESP)
12 April 2025; 14:00	Report	S. Hessels 4	Goals	Inaba 5	Morača Sports Center, Podgorica; Referees: György Kun (HUN), Xevi Buch (ESP)

12 April 2025; 16:10	Report	Germany	15–19	Montenegro	Morača Sports Center, Podgorica; Referees: Tomislav Copić (CRO), Konstantinos Vasileiou (GRE)
12 April 2025; 16:10	Report	Score by quarters: 3–5, 4–8, 4–3, 4–3			Morača Sports Center, Podgorica; Referees: Tomislav Copić (CRO), Konstantinos Vasileiou (GRE)
12 April 2025; 16:10	Report	Strelezkij 5	Goals	Gardašević, Moskov 3	Morača Sports Center, Podgorica; Referees: Tomislav Copić (CRO), Konstantinos Vasileiou (GRE)

=== Semifinals ===
12 April 2025; 18:20	Report	Hungary	14–18	Greece	Morača Sports Center, Podgorica; Referees: Andreja Stanojević (SRB), Peter de Jong (NED)
12 April 2025; 18:20	Report	Score by quarters: 4–4, 4–3, 2–5, 4–6			Morača Sports Center, Podgorica; Referees: Andreja Stanojević (SRB), Peter de Jong (NED)
12 April 2025; 18:20	Report	Manhercz 4	Goals	Argyropoulos 5	Morača Sports Center, Podgorica; Referees: Andreja Stanojević (SRB), Peter de Jong (NED)

12 April 2025; 20:30	Report	Spain	19–14	Croatia	Morača Sports Center, Podgorica; Referees: Raffaele Colombo (ITA), Gernot Häntschel (GER)
12 April 2025; 20:30	Report	Score by quarters: 8–6, 6–3, 3–2, 2–3			Morača Sports Center, Podgorica; Referees: Raffaele Colombo (ITA), Gernot Häntschel (GER)
12 April 2025; 20:30	Report	Granados 7	Goals	Bašić, Žuvela 3	Morača Sports Center, Podgorica; Referees: Raffaele Colombo (ITA), Gernot Häntschel (GER)

=== Seventh place game ===
13 April 2025; 14:00	Report	Japan	11–16	Germany	Morača Sports Center, Podgorica; Referees: Božo Đurašković (MNE), Peter de Jong (NED)
13 April 2025; 14:00	Report	Score by quarters: 2–4, 2–5, 4–3, 3–4			Morača Sports Center, Podgorica; Referees: Božo Đurašković (MNE), Peter de Jong (NED)
13 April 2025; 14:00	Report	Inaba 3	Goals	Bozic 5	Morača Sports Center, Podgorica; Referees: Božo Đurašković (MNE), Peter de Jong (NED)

=== Fifth place game ===
13 April 2025; 16:10	Report	Netherlands	14–15	Montenegro	Morača Sports Center, Podgorica; Referees: Chisato Kurosaki (JPN), Konstantinos Vasileiou (GRE)
13 April 2025; 16:10	Report	Score by quarters: 3–1, 3–4, 4–5, 4–5			Morača Sports Center, Podgorica; Referees: Chisato Kurosaki (JPN), Konstantinos Vasileiou (GRE)
13 April 2025; 16:10	Report	Van der Weijden 5	Goals	Radović 3	Morača Sports Center, Podgorica; Referees: Chisato Kurosaki (JPN), Konstantinos Vasileiou (GRE)

=== Third place game ===
13 April 2025; 18:20	Report	Hungary	18–15 (PSO)	Croatia	Morača Sports Center, Podgorica; Referees: Xevi Buch (ESP), Andreja Stanojević (SRB)
13 April 2025; 18:20	Report	Score by quarters: 3–4, 4–4, 4–2, 3–4 PSO: 4–1			Morača Sports Center, Podgorica; Referees: Xevi Buch (ESP), Andreja Stanojević (SRB)
13 April 2025; 18:20	Report	Manhercz 3	Goals	Fatović 4	Morača Sports Center, Podgorica; Referees: Xevi Buch (ESP), Andreja Stanojević (SRB)

=== Final ===
13 April 2025; 20:30	Report	Greece	14–16	Spain	Morača Sports Center, Podgorica; Referees: György Kun (HUN), Raffaele Colombo (ITA)
13 April 2025; 20:30	Report	Score by quarters: 4–2, 4–6, 2–4, 4–4			Morača Sports Center, Podgorica; Referees: György Kun (HUN), Raffaele Colombo (ITA)
13 April 2025; 20:30	Report	Argyropoulos 5	Goals	Granados 4	Morača Sports Center, Podgorica; Referees: György Kun (HUN), Raffaele Colombo (ITA)

== Final standings ==
Rank	Team
Gold medal	Spain
Silver medal	Greece
Bronze medal	Hungary
4	Croatia
5	Montenegro
6	Netherlands
7	Germany
8	Japan

2025 FINA Men's Water Polo World Cup

Spain
Second title

Team roster

Unai Aguirre (GK), Alberto Munárriz (c), Álvaro Granados, Bernat Sanahuja, Miguel del Toro, Fran Valera, Marc Valls, Sergi Cabanas, José Bustos, Pol Daura, Unai Biel, Alejandro Bustos, Eduardo Lorrio (GK), Oscar Asensio, Oscar Blasco
Head coach: David Martín.

== See also ==
- 2025 World Aquatics Women's Water Polo World Cup
