= Reuel D'Souza =

Canadian water polo player (born 1999)

Personal information
- Born: 10 March 1999 (age 27) Mangalore, India

Sport
- Sport: Water polo
Medal record
Representing Canada
Pan American Games
Silver medal – second place	2019 Lima	Team competition

Reuel D'Souza (born March 10, 1999) is a male water polo player from Canada. He is a member of the Canada men's national water polo team.
