= Water polo at the 2025 World Aquatics Championships – Men's tournament – Oceanian qualification =

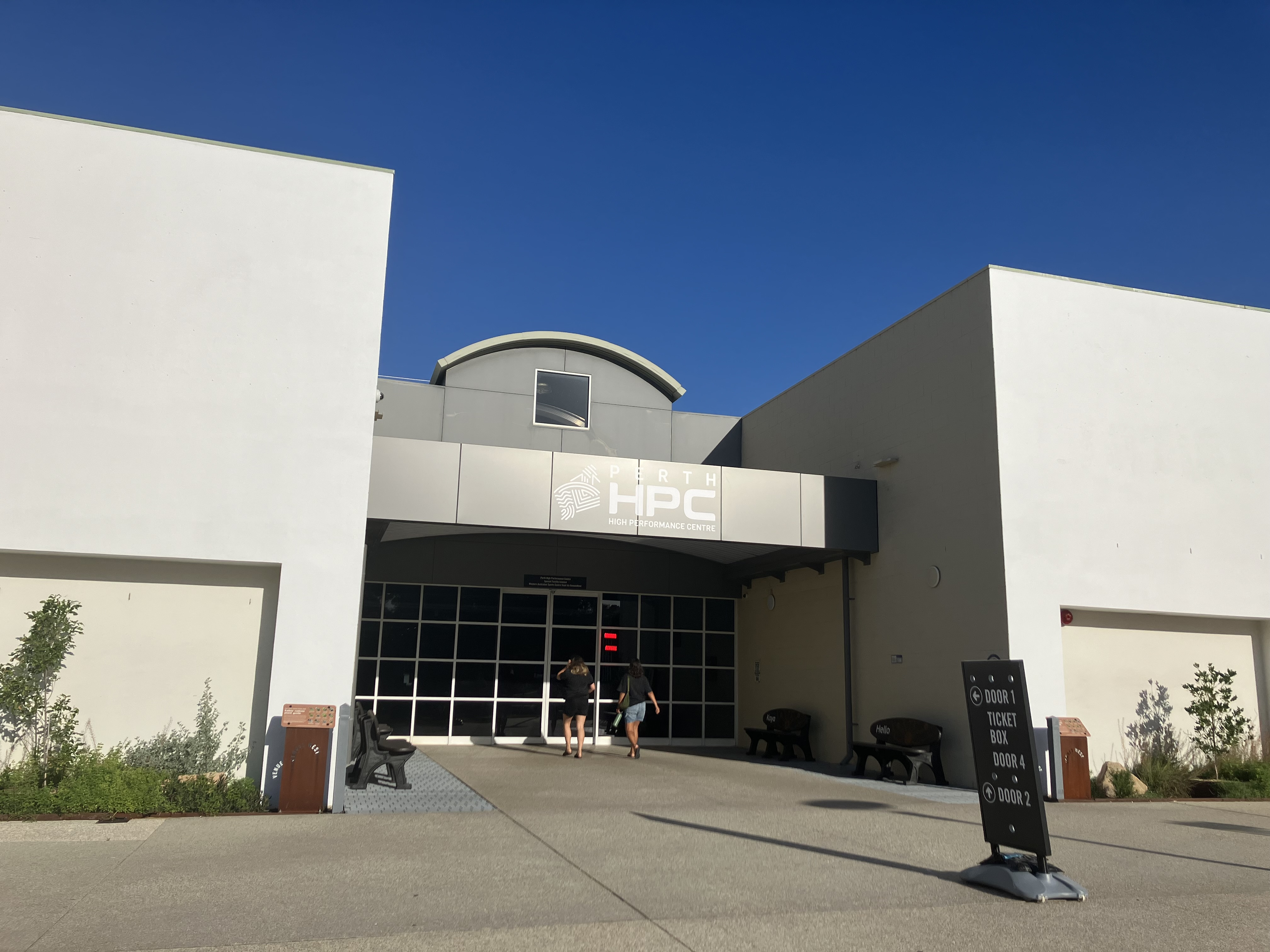
- The Perth High Performance Centre in Perth hosted the qualifier.

Tournament details
- Host country: Australia
- Venue: 1 (in 1 host city)
- Dates: 17–22 April 2025
- Teams: 2 (from 1 confederation)

Final positions
- Champions: Australia
- Runners-up: New Zealand

Tournament statistics
- Matches played: 3
- Goals scored: 88 (29.33 per match)

The Water polo at the 2025 World Aquatics Championships – Men's tournament – Oceanian qualification decided who qualified for the 2025 World Aquatics Championships from Oceania. Held in Perth, Australia from 17 to 22 April 2025, the qualifier were contested by Australia and New Zealand.

Australia would comfortably win all three games and qualified for the 2025 World Aquatics Championships.

== Format ==
Australia and New Zealand would play each other three times in a best of three series, where the overall winners would progress to the 2025 World Aquatics Championships.

== Venue ==
The Perth High Performance Centre in Perth hosted the qualifier.

Water polo at the 2025 World Aquatics Championships – Men's tournament – Oceanian qualification is located in Australia	Perth
Water polo at the 2025 World Aquatics Championships – Men's tournament – Oceanian qualification is located in Australia	Perth High Performance Centre
Water polo at the 2025 World Aquatics Championships – Men's tournament – Oceanian qualification is located in Australia	Capacity: 1,000

== Results ==
=== Bracket ===
Team 1	Series	Team 2	Game 1	Game 2	Game 3
Australia	3–0	New Zealand	18–7	24–9	21–9

=== Matches ===
17 April 2025; 15:00	Report	Australia	18–7	New Zealand	Perth High Performance Centre, Perth; Attendance: 1,000
17 April 2025; 15:00	Report	Score by quarters: –, –, –, –			Perth High Performance Centre, Perth; Attendance: 1,000
17 April 2025; 15:00	Report	Power 5	Goals	Baggott, Schuler 2	Perth High Performance Centre, Perth; Attendance: 1,000

19 April 2025; 15:00	Report	Australia	24–9	New Zealand	Perth High Performance Centre, Perth; Attendance: 1,000
19 April 2025; 15:00	Report	Score by quarters: –, –, –, –			Perth High Performance Centre, Perth; Attendance: 1,000
19 April 2025; 15:00	Report	Lambie 5	Goals	Howarth 3	Perth High Performance Centre, Perth; Attendance: 1,000

22 April 2025; 15:00	Report	Australia	21–9	New Zealand	Perth High Performance Centre, Perth; Attendance: 1,000
22 April 2025; 15:00	Report	Score by quarters: –, –, –, –			Perth High Performance Centre, Perth; Attendance: 1,000
22 April 2025; 15:00	Report		Goals	Wicken 2	Perth High Performance Centre, Perth; Attendance: 1,000

== Broadcasting rights ==
Kayo Sports showed the matches in Australia.
