= Georgios Stavridis =

Greek water polo referee

Georgios Stavridis Γεώργιος Σταυρίδης
- Born: June 15, 1976 (age 50); Piraeus, Greece
- Years active: since 2005
- Known for: water polo refereeing

Georgios Stavridis (Greek: Γεώργιος Σταυρίδης; born 15 June 1976) is a Greek water polo referee, who has officiated in the water polo tournaments at the Olympic Games of 2012, 2016, 2020 and 2024, and in the World water polo championships of 2011, 2017, 2019, 2022 and 2025.

He is widely considered as one of the top water-polo referees.

In July 2025, following his officiating at the gold-medal final between Spain and Hungary at the World Championships in Singapore, the World Aquatics praised his yearlong refereeing records.

== Career ==
Stavridis started refereeing in 2005. He has officiated the following key games:

- Women Water Polo Gold Medal Final (London 2012): USA – Spain
- Men Water Polo Bronze Medal Final (London 2012): Serbia - Montenegro
- Men Water Polo Gold Medal Final (Rio 2016): Serbia - Croatia
- Women Water Polo Bronze Medal Final (Tokyo 2020): Hungary - Russia
- Men Water Polo Bronze Medal Final (Tokyo 2020): Hungary - Spain
- Men Water Polo Gold Medal Final, World Aquatics Championships (Singapore 2025): Hungary - Spain
