= 2020 Men's Water Polo Olympic Qualification Tournament =

Tournament details
- Host country: Netherlands
- Venue: 1 (in 1 host city)
- Dates: 14–21 February 2021
- Teams: 12 (from 2 confederations)

Final positions
- Champions: Montenegro
- Runners-up: Greece
- Third place: Croatia
- Fourth place: Russia

Tournament statistics
- Matches played: 36
- Goals scored: 844 (23.44 per match)
- Top scorers: (Russia) Konstantin Kharkov (Russia) Daniil Merkulov (24 goals)

The 2020 Men's Water Polo Olympic Qualification Tournament took place from 14 to 21 February 2021 in Rotterdam, Netherlands. The top three teams advanced to the Olympics.

The tournament was scheduled to take place from 22 to 29 March and then from 31 May to 7 June 2020, but was postponed due to the COVID-19 pandemic.

Due to their semifinal wins, both Montenegro and Greece qualified for the Olympics. Croatia followed by winning the third place game.

== Participants ==
Means of qualification	Date	Venue	Berths	Qualified
Host nation	—	—	1	Netherlands
2019 Pan American Games	4–10 August 2019	Peru	3	Canada
2019 Pan American Games	4–10 August 2019	Peru	3	Brazil
2019 Pan American Games	4–10 August 2019	Peru	3	~~Argentina~~
2020 European Championship	14–26 January 2020	Hungary	9	Montenegro
2020 European Championship	14–26 January 2020	Hungary	9	Croatia
2020 European Championship	14–26 January 2020	Hungary	9	Greece
2020 European Championship	14–26 January 2020	Hungary	9	Russia
2020 European Championship	14–26 January 2020	Hungary	9	Germany
2020 European Championship	14–26 January 2020	Hungary	9	Georgia
2020 European Championship	14–26 January 2020	Hungary	9	Romania
2020 European Championship	14–26 January 2020	Hungary	9	Turkey
2020 European Championship	14–26 January 2020	Hungary	9	France
Total			12	

== Draw ==
The draw took place on 11 February 2020 in Lausanne, Switzerland.

Group A	Group B
Georgia; ~~Turkey~~; Canada; Brazil; Montenegro; Greece	Croatia; Netherlands; France; Russia; Germany; Romania^{1}

^{1} Argentina withdrew from the tournament in mid-February. FINA replaced the South-American team with Romania

== Preliminary round ==
All times are local (UTC+1).

=== Group A ===
Pos	Team	Pld	W	D	L	GF	GA	GD	Pts	Qualification
1	Montenegro	4	4	0	0	55	25	+30	8	Quarterfinals
2	Greece	4	3	0	1	49	32	+17	6	Quarterfinals
3	Georgia	4	2	0	2	45	41	+4	4	Quarterfinals
4	Canada	4	1	0	3	35	61	−26	2	Quarterfinals
5	Brazil	4	0	0	4	28	53	−25	0	
6	Turkey (Note: Turkey was disqualified after several players tested positive for COVID-19.)	0	0	0	0	0	0	0	0	Disqualified

Source: Microplustiming
Rules for classification: 1) points; 2) head-to-head points; 3) head-to-head goal difference; 4) head-to-head number of goals scored; 5) goal difference.
Notes:

14 February 2021; 13:00	Report	Georgia	10–11	Greece	Zwemcentrum, Rotterdam; Referees: Michiel Zwart (NED), Frank Ohme (GER)
14 February 2021; 13:00	Report	Score by quarters: 2–3, 3–5, 5–2, 0–1			Zwemcentrum, Rotterdam; Referees: Michiel Zwart (NED), Frank Ohme (GER)
14 February 2021; 13:00	Report	Elez 4	Goals	Fountoulis 5	Zwemcentrum, Rotterdam; Referees: Michiel Zwart (NED), Frank Ohme (GER)

14 February 2021; 14:30	Report	Canada	11–7	Brazil	Zwemcentrum, Rotterdam; Referees: Nenad Periš (CRO), Sébastien Dervieux (FRA)
14 February 2021; 14:30	Report	Score by quarters: 4–3, 1–1, 3–2, 3–1			Zwemcentrum, Rotterdam; Referees: Nenad Periš (CRO), Sébastien Dervieux (FRA)
14 February 2021; 14:30	Report	five players 2	Goals	Real 2	Zwemcentrum, Rotterdam; Referees: Nenad Periš (CRO), Sébastien Dervieux (FRA)

15 February 2021; 16:00	Report	Greece	15–8	Brazil	Zwemcentrum, Rotterdam; Referees: Nenad Periš (CRO), Adrian Alexandrescu (ROU)
15 February 2021; 16:00	Report	Score by quarters: 5–1, 5–2, 4–2, 1–3			Zwemcentrum, Rotterdam; Referees: Nenad Periš (CRO), Adrian Alexandrescu (ROU)
15 February 2021; 16:00	Report	Genidounias, Vlachopoulos 3	Goals	Fernandes 8	Zwemcentrum, Rotterdam; Referees: Nenad Periš (CRO), Adrian Alexandrescu (ROU)

15 February 2021; 17:30	Report	Montenegro	21–7	Canada	Zwemcentrum, Rotterdam; Referees: Michiel Zwart (NED), Arkadiy Voevodin (RUS)
15 February 2021; 17:30	Report	Score by quarters: 7–1, 6–3, 4–1, 4–2			Zwemcentrum, Rotterdam; Referees: Michiel Zwart (NED), Arkadiy Voevodin (RUS)
15 February 2021; 17:30	Report	Ivović, Matković 5	Goals	three players 2	Zwemcentrum, Rotterdam; Referees: Michiel Zwart (NED), Arkadiy Voevodin (RUS)

16 February 2021; 13:00	Report	Brazil	5–15	Montenegro	Zwemcentrum, Rotterdam; Referees: Frank Ohme (GER), Nenad Periš (CRO)
16 February 2021; 13:00	Report	Score by quarters: 1–3, 3–6, 1–2, 0–4			Zwemcentrum, Rotterdam; Referees: Frank Ohme (GER), Nenad Periš (CRO)
16 February 2021; 13:00	Report	G. Guimarães 2	Goals	Ivović, Petković 3	Zwemcentrum, Rotterdam; Referees: Frank Ohme (GER), Nenad Periš (CRO)

16 February 2021; 16:00	Report	Canada	11–14	Georgia	Zwemcentrum, Rotterdam; Referees: Adrian Alexandrescu (ROU), Arkadiy Voevodin (RUS)
16 February 2021; 16:00	Report	Score by quarters: 1–3, 2–3, 4–4, 4–4			Zwemcentrum, Rotterdam; Referees: Adrian Alexandrescu (ROU), Arkadiy Voevodin (RUS)
16 February 2021; 16:00	Report	Patterson 2	Goals	Jelaca 4	Zwemcentrum, Rotterdam; Referees: Adrian Alexandrescu (ROU), Arkadiy Voevodin (RUS)

17 February 2021; 16:00	Report	Greece	4–8	Montenegro	Zwemcentrum, Rotterdam; Referees: Xevi Buch (ESP), Sébastien Dervieux (FRA)
17 February 2021; 16:00	Report	Score by quarters: 1–4, 1–1, 1–1, 1–2			Zwemcentrum, Rotterdam; Referees: Xevi Buch (ESP), Sébastien Dervieux (FRA)
17 February 2021; 16:00	Report	four players 1	Goals	Brguljan, Petković 2	Zwemcentrum, Rotterdam; Referees: Xevi Buch (ESP), Sébastien Dervieux (FRA)

17 February 2021; 17:30	Report	Georgia	12–8	Brazil	Zwemcentrum, Rotterdam; Referees: Michael Goldenberg (USA), Nenad Periš (CRO)
17 February 2021; 17:30	Report	Score by quarters: 3–1, 3–1, 2–1, 4–5			Zwemcentrum, Rotterdam; Referees: Michael Goldenberg (USA), Nenad Periš (CRO)
17 February 2021; 17:30	Report	Elez, Shushiashvili 3	Goals	three players 2	Zwemcentrum, Rotterdam; Referees: Michael Goldenberg (USA), Nenad Periš (CRO)

18 February 2021; 13:00	Report	Montenegro	11–9	Georgia	Zwemcentrum, Rotterdam; Referees: Michiel Zwart (NED), Nenad Periš (CRO)
18 February 2021; 13:00	Report	Score by quarters: 3–3, 3–1, 1–1, 4–4			Zwemcentrum, Rotterdam; Referees: Michiel Zwart (NED), Nenad Periš (CRO)
18 February 2021; 13:00	Report	three players 2	Goals	Magrakvelidze, Vapenski 2	Zwemcentrum, Rotterdam; Referees: Michiel Zwart (NED), Nenad Periš (CRO)

18 February 2021; 14:30	Report	Canada	6–19	Greece	Zwemcentrum, Rotterdam; Referees: Adrian Alexandrescu (ROU), Frank Ohme (GER)
18 February 2021; 14:30	Report	Score by quarters: 1–6, 1–3, 2–4, 2–6			Zwemcentrum, Rotterdam; Referees: Adrian Alexandrescu (ROU), Frank Ohme (GER)
18 February 2021; 14:30	Report	Constantin-Bicari 2	Goals	Argyropoulos 4	Zwemcentrum, Rotterdam; Referees: Adrian Alexandrescu (ROU), Frank Ohme (GER)

=== Group B ===
Pos	Team	Pld	W	D	L	GF	GA	GD	Pts	Qualification
1	Russia	5	4	1	0	64	49	+15	9	Quarterfinals
2	Croatia	5	4	0	1	89	46	+43	8	Quarterfinals
3	France	5	2	1	2	62	56	+6	5 (Note: France 11–11 Netherlands)	Quarterfinals
4	Netherlands (H)	5	2	1	2	49	65	−16	5	Quarterfinals
5	Romania	5	1	1	3	42	57	−15	3	
6	Germany	5	0	0	5	42	75	−33	0	

Source: Microplustiming
Rules for classification: 1) points; 2) head-to-head points; 3) head-to-head goal difference; 4) head-to-head number of goals scored; 5) goal difference.
(H) Hosts
Notes:

14 February 2021; 16:00	Report	Netherlands	11–10	Germany	Zwemcentrum, Rotterdam; Referees: Xevi Buch (ESP), Michael Goldenberg (USA)
14 February 2021; 16:00	Report	Score by quarters: 5–2, 3–2, 2–2, 1–4			Zwemcentrum, Rotterdam; Referees: Xevi Buch (ESP), Michael Goldenberg (USA)
14 February 2021; 16:00	Report	Muller 4	Goals	Real 3	Zwemcentrum, Rotterdam; Referees: Xevi Buch (ESP), Michael Goldenberg (USA)

14 February 2021; 19:00	Report	Croatia	16–6	Romania	Zwemcentrum, Rotterdam; Referees: Dion Willis (RSA), Fabio Toffoli (BRA)
14 February 2021; 19:00	Report	Score by quarters: 6–2, 3–1, 4–2, 4–2			Zwemcentrum, Rotterdam; Referees: Dion Willis (RSA), Fabio Toffoli (BRA)
14 February 2021; 19:00	Report	Burić 3	Goals	Fulea, Georgescu 2	Zwemcentrum, Rotterdam; Referees: Dion Willis (RSA), Fabio Toffoli (BRA)

14 February 2021; 20:30	Report	France	12–13	Russia	Zwemcentrum, Rotterdam; Referees: Boris Margeta (SLO), Stanko Ivanovski (MNE)
14 February 2021; 20:30	Report	Score by quarters: 2–3, 2–4, 5–3, 3–3			Zwemcentrum, Rotterdam; Referees: Boris Margeta (SLO), Stanko Ivanovski (MNE)
14 February 2021; 20:30	Report	Crousillat 5	Goals	Nagaev 4	Zwemcentrum, Rotterdam; Referees: Boris Margeta (SLO), Stanko Ivanovski (MNE)

15 February 2021; 13:00	Report	Romania	9–9	Russia	Zwemcentrum, Rotterdam; Referees: Nikolaos Boudramis (GRE), Mikhail Dykman (CAN)
15 February 2021; 13:00	Report	Score by quarters: 3–1, 1–2, 2–4, 3–2			Zwemcentrum, Rotterdam; Referees: Nikolaos Boudramis (GRE), Mikhail Dykman (CAN)
15 February 2021; 13:00	Report	three players 2	Goals	Merkulov 4	Zwemcentrum, Rotterdam; Referees: Nikolaos Boudramis (GRE), Mikhail Dykman (CAN)

15 February 2021; 14:30	Report	Germany	12–13	France	Zwemcentrum, Rotterdam; Referees: Boris Margeta (SLO), Michael Goldenberg (USA)
15 February 2021; 14:30	Report	Score by quarters: 1–4, 3–2, 5–2, 3–5			Zwemcentrum, Rotterdam; Referees: Boris Margeta (SLO), Michael Goldenberg (USA)
15 February 2021; 14:30	Report	Strelezkij 6	Goals	Crousillat, Marzouki 3	Zwemcentrum, Rotterdam; Referees: Boris Margeta (SLO), Michael Goldenberg (USA)

15 February 2021; 19:00	Report	Croatia	25–8	Netherlands	Zwemcentrum, Rotterdam; Referees: Xevi Buch (ESP), Irakli Sanadze (GEO)
15 February 2021; 19:00	Report	Score by quarters: 7–1, 7–4, 5–1, 6–2			Zwemcentrum, Rotterdam; Referees: Xevi Buch (ESP), Irakli Sanadze (GEO)
15 February 2021; 19:00	Report	Bukić 6	Goals	Van IJperen, Lucas 2	Zwemcentrum, Rotterdam; Referees: Xevi Buch (ESP), Irakli Sanadze (GEO)

16 February 2021; 17:30	Report	Russia	17–5	Germany	Zwemcentrum, Rotterdam; Referees: Xevi Buch (ESP), Boris Margeta (SLO)
16 February 2021; 17:30	Report	Score by quarters: 5–1, 1–2, 5–0, 6–2			Zwemcentrum, Rotterdam; Referees: Xevi Buch (ESP), Boris Margeta (SLO)
16 February 2021; 17:30	Report	Merkulov 6	Goals	Stamm 2	Zwemcentrum, Rotterdam; Referees: Xevi Buch (ESP), Boris Margeta (SLO)

16 February 2021; 19:00	Report	Netherlands	9–8	Romania	Zwemcentrum, Rotterdam; Referees: Michael Goldenberg (USA), Stanko Ivanovski (MNE)
16 February 2021; 19:00	Report	Score by quarters: 2–1, 2–3, 2–2, 3–2			Zwemcentrum, Rotterdam; Referees: Michael Goldenberg (USA), Stanko Ivanovski (MNE)
16 February 2021; 19:00	Report	Koopman 3	Goals	Georgescu 4	Zwemcentrum, Rotterdam; Referees: Michael Goldenberg (USA), Stanko Ivanovski (MNE)

16 February 2021; 20:30	Report	France	10–13	Croatia	Zwemcentrum, Rotterdam; Referees: Dion Willis (RSA), Erkan Türkkan (TUR)
16 February 2021; 20:30	Report	Score by quarters: 2–3, 3–2, 2–5, 3–3			Zwemcentrum, Rotterdam; Referees: Dion Willis (RSA), Erkan Türkkan (TUR)
16 February 2021; 20:30	Report	Canonne 3	Goals	Bukić, Fatović 3	Zwemcentrum, Rotterdam; Referees: Dion Willis (RSA), Erkan Türkkan (TUR)

17 February 2021; 13:00	Report	Romania	12–7	Germany	Zwemcentrum, Rotterdam; Referees: Dion Willis (RSA), Nikolaos Boudramis (GRE)
17 February 2021; 13:00	Report	Score by quarters: 1–1, 4–4, 4–1, 3–1			Zwemcentrum, Rotterdam; Referees: Dion Willis (RSA), Nikolaos Boudramis (GRE)
17 February 2021; 13:00	Report	Ghiban, Radu 3	Goals	Cuk, Schütze 2	Zwemcentrum, Rotterdam; Referees: Dion Willis (RSA), Nikolaos Boudramis (GRE)

17 February 2021; 14:30	Report	Croatia	13–14	Russia	Zwemcentrum, Rotterdam; Referees: Erkan Türkkan (TUR), Irakli Sanadze (GEO)
17 February 2021; 14:30	Report	Score by quarters: 5–3, 4–4, 4–4, 0–3			Zwemcentrum, Rotterdam; Referees: Erkan Türkkan (TUR), Irakli Sanadze (GEO)
17 February 2021; 14:30	Report	Fatović 4	Goals	Kharkov 5	Zwemcentrum, Rotterdam; Referees: Erkan Türkkan (TUR), Irakli Sanadze (GEO)

17 February 2021; 19:00	Report	Netherlands	11–11	France	Zwemcentrum, Rotterdam; Referees: Boris Margeta (SLO), Stanko Ivanovski (MNE)
17 February 2021; 19:00	Report	Score by quarters: 2–3, 0–2, 3–4, 6–2			Zwemcentrum, Rotterdam; Referees: Boris Margeta (SLO), Stanko Ivanovski (MNE)
17 February 2021; 19:00	Report	Muller, Winkelhorst 3	Goals	Marzouki 3	Zwemcentrum, Rotterdam; Referees: Boris Margeta (SLO), Stanko Ivanovski (MNE)

18 February 2021; 17:30	Report	France	16–7	Romania	Zwemcentrum, Rotterdam; Referees: Michael Goldenberg (USA), Xevi Buch (ESP)
18 February 2021; 17:30	Report	Score by quarters: 5–2, 3–1, 5–1, 3–3			Zwemcentrum, Rotterdam; Referees: Michael Goldenberg (USA), Xevi Buch (ESP)
18 February 2021; 17:30	Report	Marzouki 4	Goals	Dragomirescu, Radu 2	Zwemcentrum, Rotterdam; Referees: Michael Goldenberg (USA), Xevi Buch (ESP)

18 February 2021; 19:00	Report	Russia	11–10	Netherlands	Zwemcentrum, Rotterdam; Referees: Dion Willis (RSA), Boris Margeta (SLO)
18 February 2021; 19:00	Report	Score by quarters: 3–3, 3–1, 1–2, 4–4			Zwemcentrum, Rotterdam; Referees: Dion Willis (RSA), Boris Margeta (SLO)
18 February 2021; 19:00	Report	Kholod 5	Goals	three players 2	Zwemcentrum, Rotterdam; Referees: Dion Willis (RSA), Boris Margeta (SLO)

18 February 2021; 20:30	Report	Croatia	22–8	Germany	Zwemcentrum, Rotterdam; Referees: Fabio Toffoli (BRA), Mikhail Dykman (CAN)
18 February 2021; 20:30	Report	Score by quarters: 5–3, 6–2, 5–1, 6–2			Zwemcentrum, Rotterdam; Referees: Fabio Toffoli (BRA), Mikhail Dykman (CAN)
18 February 2021; 20:30	Report	Bušlje 5	Goals	Real 2	Zwemcentrum, Rotterdam; Referees: Fabio Toffoli (BRA), Mikhail Dykman (CAN)

== Knockout stage ==
=== Bracket ===
Quarterfinals
19 February
Montenegro	13
Netherlands	7
19 February
Georgia	6
Croatia	15
19 February
Greece (PSO)	13 (4)
France	13 (1)
19 February
Canada	9
Russia	17

Semifinals
20 February
Montenegro (PSO)	10 (4)
Croatia	10 (2)
20 February
Greece	13
Russia	10

Final
21 February
Montenegro	10
Greece	9
Third place
21 February
Croatia (PSO)	11 (14)
Russia	11 (13)

Fifth place bracket

5–8th place semifinals
20 February
Netherlands	14
Georgia	11
20 February
France	11
Canada	9

Fifth place
21 February
Netherlands	10
France	9
Seventh place
21 February
Georgia	18
Canada	10

=== Quarterfinals ===
19 February 2021; 14:00	Report	Montenegro	13–7	Netherlands	Zwemcentrum, Rotterdam; Referees: Sébastien Dervieux (FRA), Arkadiy Voevodin (RUS)
19 February 2021; 14:00	Report	Score by quarters: 4–0, 3–3, 3–4, 3–0			Zwemcentrum, Rotterdam; Referees: Sébastien Dervieux (FRA), Arkadiy Voevodin (RUS)
19 February 2021; 14:00	Report	Ivović 3	Goals	Janssen 3	Zwemcentrum, Rotterdam; Referees: Sébastien Dervieux (FRA), Arkadiy Voevodin (RUS)

19 February 2021; 16:00	Report	Greece	17–14 (PSO)	France	Zwemcentrum, Rotterdam; Referees: Adrian Alexandrescu (ROU), Frank Ohme (GER)
19 February 2021; 16:00	Report	Score by quarters: 6–4, 1–4, 3–4, 3–1 PSO: 4–1			Zwemcentrum, Rotterdam; Referees: Adrian Alexandrescu (ROU), Frank Ohme (GER)
19 February 2021; 16:00	Report	Fountoulis 4	Goals	Vernoux 4	Zwemcentrum, Rotterdam; Referees: Adrian Alexandrescu (ROU), Frank Ohme (GER)

19 February 2021; 18:00	Report	Georgia	6–15	Croatia	Zwemcentrum, Rotterdam; Referees: Boris Margeta (SLO), Erkan Turkkan (TUR)
19 February 2021; 18:00	Report	Score by quarters: 2–3, 1–6, 1–2, 2–4			Zwemcentrum, Rotterdam; Referees: Boris Margeta (SLO), Erkan Turkkan (TUR)
19 February 2021; 18:00	Report	Elez, Shushiashvili 2	Goals	Bukić 4	Zwemcentrum, Rotterdam; Referees: Boris Margeta (SLO), Erkan Turkkan (TUR)

19 February 2021; 20:00	Report	Canada	9–17	Russia	Zwemcentrum, Rotterdam; Referees: Fabio Toffoli (BRA), Nikolaos Boudramis (GRE)
19 February 2021; 20:00	Report	Score by quarters: 2–5, 3–3, 3–4, 1–5			Zwemcentrum, Rotterdam; Referees: Fabio Toffoli (BRA), Nikolaos Boudramis (GRE)
19 February 2021; 20:00	Report	Constantin-Bicari, Côté 3	Goals	Kharkov 5	Zwemcentrum, Rotterdam; Referees: Fabio Toffoli (BRA), Nikolaos Boudramis (GRE)

=== 5–8th place semifinals ===
20 February 2021; 14:00	Report	Netherlands	14–11	Georgia	Zwemcentrum, Rotterdam; Referees: Arkadiy Voevodin (RUS), Sébastien Dervieux (FRA)
20 February 2021; 14:00	Report	Score by quarters: 4–1, 4–3, 3–4, 3–3			Zwemcentrum, Rotterdam; Referees: Arkadiy Voevodin (RUS), Sébastien Dervieux (FRA)
20 February 2021; 14:00	Report	Janssen 5	Goals	Jakhaia 3	Zwemcentrum, Rotterdam; Referees: Arkadiy Voevodin (RUS), Sébastien Dervieux (FRA)

20 February 2021; 16:00	Report	France	11–9	Canada	Zwemcentrum, Rotterdam; Referees: Adrian Alexandrescu (ROU), Stanko Ivanovski (MNE)
20 February 2021; 16:00	Report	Score by quarters: 3–2, 1–2, 5–3, 2–2			Zwemcentrum, Rotterdam; Referees: Adrian Alexandrescu (ROU), Stanko Ivanovski (MNE)
20 February 2021; 16:00	Report	Marzouki 4	Goals	Côté 4	Zwemcentrum, Rotterdam; Referees: Adrian Alexandrescu (ROU), Stanko Ivanovski (MNE)

=== Semifinals ===
20 February 2021; 18:00	Report	Montenegro	14–12 (PSO)	Croatia	Zwemcentrum, Rotterdam; Referees: Xevi Buch (ESP), Michael Goldenberg (USA)
20 February 2021; 18:00	Report	Score by quarters: 3–2, 2–3, 3–4, 2–1 PSO: 4–2			Zwemcentrum, Rotterdam; Referees: Xevi Buch (ESP), Michael Goldenberg (USA)
20 February 2021; 18:00	Report	three players 2	Goals	Bukić, Bušlje 3	Zwemcentrum, Rotterdam; Referees: Xevi Buch (ESP), Michael Goldenberg (USA)

20 February 2021; 20:00	Report	Greece	13–10	Russia	Zwemcentrum, Rotterdam; Referees: Dion Willis (RSA), Boris Margeta (SLO)
20 February 2021; 20:00	Report	Score by quarters: 4–3, 2–2, 5–4, 2–1			Zwemcentrum, Rotterdam; Referees: Dion Willis (RSA), Boris Margeta (SLO)
20 February 2021; 20:00	Report	Vlachopoulos 5	Goals	Kharkov 5	Zwemcentrum, Rotterdam; Referees: Dion Willis (RSA), Boris Margeta (SLO)

=== Seventh place game ===
21 February 2021; 10:00	Report	Georgia	18–10	Canada	Zwemcentrum, Rotterdam; Referees: Stanko Ivanovski (MNE), Nenad Periš (CRO)
21 February 2021; 10:00	Report	Score by quarters: 4–2, 8–3, 3–2, 3–3			Zwemcentrum, Rotterdam; Referees: Stanko Ivanovski (MNE), Nenad Periš (CRO)
21 February 2021; 10:00	Report	Magrakvelidze 4	Goals	D'Souza 5	Zwemcentrum, Rotterdam; Referees: Stanko Ivanovski (MNE), Nenad Periš (CRO)

=== Fifth place game ===
21 February 2021; 12:00	Report	Netherlands	10–9	France	Zwemcentrum, Rotterdam; Referees: Mikhail Dykman (CAN), Arkadiy Voevodin (RUS)
21 February 2021; 12:00	Report	Score by quarters: 4–2, 1–3, 0–3, 5–1			Zwemcentrum, Rotterdam; Referees: Mikhail Dykman (CAN), Arkadiy Voevodin (RUS)
21 February 2021; 12:00	Report	Veenhuis, van IJperen 3	Goals	three players 2	Zwemcentrum, Rotterdam; Referees: Mikhail Dykman (CAN), Arkadiy Voevodin (RUS)

=== Third place game ===
21 February 2021; 14:00	Report	Croatia	25–24 (PSO)	Russia	Zwemcentrum, Rotterdam; Referees: Michiel Zwart (NED), Adrian Alexandrescu (ROU)
21 February 2021; 14:00	Report	Score by quarters: 4–3, 2–4, 3–1, 2–3 PSO: 14–13			Zwemcentrum, Rotterdam; Referees: Michiel Zwart (NED), Adrian Alexandrescu (ROU)
21 February 2021; 14:00	Report	three players 2	Goals	Kharkov, Merkulov 3	Zwemcentrum, Rotterdam; Referees: Michiel Zwart (NED), Adrian Alexandrescu (ROU)

=== Final ===
21 February 2021; 16:00	Report	Montenegro	10–9	Greece	Zwemcentrum, Rotterdam; Referees: Sébastien Dervieux (FRA), Frank Ohme (GER)
21 February 2021; 16:00	Report	Score by quarters: 2–3, 3–3, 1–2, 4–1			Zwemcentrum, Rotterdam; Referees: Sébastien Dervieux (FRA), Frank Ohme (GER)
21 February 2021; 16:00	Report	Matković 5	Goals	Argyropoulos 4	Zwemcentrum, Rotterdam; Referees: Sébastien Dervieux (FRA), Frank Ohme (GER)

== Final ranking ==
Qualified for the Summer Olympics

Rank	Team
1st place, gold medalist(s)	Montenegro
2nd place, silver medalist(s)	Greece
3rd place, bronze medalist(s)	Croatia
4	Russia
5	Netherlands
6	France
7	Georgia
8	Canada
9	Romania
10	Brazil
11	Germany
DSQ	Turkey

== See also ==
- 2020 Women's Water Polo Olympic Qualification Tournament
