= 2023 World Aquatics Men's Water Polo World Cup =

2023 FINA Men's Water Polo World Cup
- League: FINA Water Polo World Cup
- Sport: Water polo
- Duration: 8 March – 2 July

Super Final
- Finals champions: Spain
- Runners-up: Italy

FINA Water Polo World Cup seasons
- ← 2018 2025 →

The 2023 Men's FINA Water Polo World Cup was the 17th edition of the tournament. It ran from 8 March to 2 July 2023. The Super final took place between 30 June and 2 July 2023 in Los Angeles, United States.

From this year on, the tournament was replacing the FINA Water Polo World League.

Spain won their first title after defeating Italy in the final.

== Format ==
There were two divisions. In Division 1, the top twelve teams from the World Championships played. They played all matches in March in Zagreb and Podgorica. All other teams could have signed up in Division 2, in which each continent hosted a qualification tournament. The top two teams from each of those tournaments played in an intercontinental tournament. The top-six teams of Division 1 and the top-two teams from Division 2 competed in the super final, held from 30 June to 2 July 2023. At the end of the tournament, the last-ranked team was relegated to Division 2 and the winner of Division 2 moved to Division 1 for the following year. A win gave a team three points, a win after penalties two, a loss after penalties one and a loss after regular time zero points.

== Division 1 ==
The draw was held on 1 December 2022. Group A played their tournament in Zagreb, Croatia and Group B in Podgorica, Montenegro between 8 and 14 March 2023.

=== Group A ===
Pos	Team	Pld	W	PW	PL	L	GF	GA	GD	Pts	Qualification or relegation
1	Italy	5	5	0	0	0	63	46	+17	15	Super final
2	United States	5	3	0	0	2	64	61	+3	9	Super final
3	Hungary	5	3	0	0	2	57	47	+10	9	Super final
4	Croatia (H)	5	3	0	0	2	65	56	+9	9	
5	Japan	5	1	0	0	4	51	72	−21	3	
6	France	5	0	0	0	5	45	63	−18	0	Division 2

Source: World Aquatics
Rules for classification: 1) points; 2) goal difference; 3) head-to-head result.
(H) Host

All times are local (UTC+1).

8 March 2023; 17:30	Report	Italy	13–7	Japan	Zagreb; Referees: Maro Savinović (CRO), Marta Cabañas (ESP)
8 March 2023; 17:30	Report	Score by quarters: 3–1, 4–1, 4–3, 2–2			Zagreb; Referees: Maro Savinović (CRO), Marta Cabañas (ESP)
8 March 2023; 17:30	Report	three players 3	Goals	Inaba 3	Zagreb; Referees: Maro Savinović (CRO), Marta Cabañas (ESP)

8 March 2023; 19:00	Report	Croatia	16–14	United States	Zagreb; Referees: Michiel Zwart (NED), Andreja Stanojević (SRB)
8 March 2023; 19:00	Report	Score by quarters: 5–5, 5–2, 4–3, 2–4			Zagreb; Referees: Michiel Zwart (NED), Andreja Stanojević (SRB)
8 March 2023; 19:00	Report	Kharkov 6	Goals	Bowen 4	Zagreb; Referees: Michiel Zwart (NED), Andreja Stanojević (SRB)

8 March 2023; 20:30	Report	France	6–10	Hungary	Zagreb; Referees: Nikolaos Boudramis (GRE), Stanko Ivanovski (MNE)
8 March 2023; 20:30	Report	Score by quarters: 3–2, 1–4, 1–1, 1–3			Zagreb; Referees: Nikolaos Boudramis (GRE), Stanko Ivanovski (MNE)
8 March 2023; 20:30	Report	Crousillat 2	Goals	Vámos 3	Zagreb; Referees: Nikolaos Boudramis (GRE), Stanko Ivanovski (MNE)

9 March 2023; 18:30	Report	Croatia	12–7	France	Zagreb; Referees: Michiel Zwart (NED), Daniel Bartels (AUS)
9 March 2023; 18:30	Report	Score by quarters: 3–3, 4–1, 3–1, 2–2			Zagreb; Referees: Michiel Zwart (NED), Daniel Bartels (AUS)
9 March 2023; 18:30	Report	Burić 3	Goals	seven players 1	Zagreb; Referees: Michiel Zwart (NED), Daniel Bartels (AUS)

9 March 2023; 20:30	Report	United States	13–11	Japan	Zagreb; Referees: Stanko Ivanovski (MNE), Andreja Stanojević (SRB)
9 March 2023; 20:30	Report	Score by quarters: 5–3, 4–2, 2–3, 2–3			Zagreb; Referees: Stanko Ivanovski (MNE), Andreja Stanojević (SRB)
9 March 2023; 20:30	Report	Bowen 4	Goals	Inaba 3	Zagreb; Referees: Stanko Ivanovski (MNE), Andreja Stanojević (SRB)

10 March 2023; 18:30	Report	Hungary	8–9	Italy	Zagreb; Referees: Marta Cabañas (ESP), Michiel Zwart (NED)
10 March 2023; 18:30	Report	Score by quarters: 2–2, 2–2, 2–5, 2–0			Zagreb; Referees: Marta Cabañas (ESP), Michiel Zwart (NED)
10 March 2023; 18:30	Report	Burián, Vigvári 2	Goals	Bruni 3	Zagreb; Referees: Marta Cabañas (ESP), Michiel Zwart (NED)

10 March 2023; 20:30	Report	France	9–12	United States	Zagreb; Referees: Maro Savinović (CRO), Nikolaos Boudramis (GRE)
10 March 2023; 20:30	Report	Score by quarters: 1–1, 4–3, 2–2, 2–6			Zagreb; Referees: Maro Savinović (CRO), Nikolaos Boudramis (GRE)
10 March 2023; 20:30	Report	Crousillat 3	Goals	Daube 4	Zagreb; Referees: Maro Savinović (CRO), Nikolaos Boudramis (GRE)

11 March 2023; 18:30	Report	Italy	14–13	Croatia	Zagreb; Referees: Georgios Stavridis (GRE), Veselin Mišković (MNE)
11 March 2023; 18:30	Report	Score by quarters: 2–4, 4–4, 1–4, 7–1			Zagreb; Referees: Georgios Stavridis (GRE), Veselin Mišković (MNE)
11 March 2023; 18:30	Report	Marziali 3	Goals	Marinić 4	Zagreb; Referees: Georgios Stavridis (GRE), Veselin Mišković (MNE)

11 March 2023; 20:30	Report	Japan	7–17	Hungary	Zagreb; Referees: Vojin Putniković (SRB), David Gómez (ESP)
11 March 2023; 20:30	Report	Score by quarters: 2–4, 2–4, 2–5, 1–4			Zagreb; Referees: Vojin Putniković (SRB), David Gómez (ESP)
11 March 2023; 20:30	Report	Inaba 2	Goals	three players 3	Zagreb; Referees: Vojin Putniković (SRB), David Gómez (ESP)

12 March 2023; 18:30	Report	Croatia	14–8	Japan	Zagreb; Referees: Daniel Bartels (AUS), Veselin Mišković (MNE)
12 March 2023; 18:30	Report	Score by quarters: 5–2, 5–3, 4–1, 0–2			Zagreb; Referees: Daniel Bartels (AUS), Veselin Mišković (MNE)
12 March 2023; 18:30	Report	Fatović 5	Goals	Adachi, Inaba 2	Zagreb; Referees: Daniel Bartels (AUS), Veselin Mišković (MNE)

12 March 2023; 20:30	Report	France	8–11	Italy	Zagreb; Referees: Levan Berishvili (GEO), David Gómez (ESP)
12 March 2023; 20:30	Report	Score by quarters: 5–2, 1–6, 0–2, 2–1			Zagreb; Referees: Levan Berishvili (GEO), David Gómez (ESP)
12 March 2023; 20:30	Report	Vernoux 3	Goals	Di Somma 5	Zagreb; Referees: Levan Berishvili (GEO), David Gómez (ESP)

13 March 2023; 18:30	Report	United States	15–9	Hungary	Zagreb; Referees: Georgios Stavridis (GRE), Daniel Bartels (AUS)
13 March 2023; 18:30	Report	Score by quarters: 4–2, 5–1, 4–2, 2–4			Zagreb; Referees: Georgios Stavridis (GRE), Daniel Bartels (AUS)
13 March 2023; 18:30	Report	Irving 5	Goals	Zalánki 4	Zagreb; Referees: Georgios Stavridis (GRE), Daniel Bartels (AUS)

13 March 2023; 20:30	Report	Japan	18–15	France	Zagreb; Referees: Vojin Putniković (SRB), Levan Berishvili (GEO)
13 March 2023; 20:30	Report	Score by quarters: 10–5, 0–2, 8–4, 0–4			Zagreb; Referees: Vojin Putniković (SRB), Levan Berishvili (GEO)
13 March 2023; 20:30	Report	Watanabe 5	Goals	Crousillat 6	Zagreb; Referees: Vojin Putniković (SRB), Levan Berishvili (GEO)

14 March 2023; 18:30	Report	Hungary	13–10	Croatia	Zagreb; Referees: Georgios Stavridis (GRE), Vojin Putniković (SRB)
14 March 2023; 18:30	Report	Score by quarters: 2–1, 5–4, 3–2, 3–3			Zagreb; Referees: Georgios Stavridis (GRE), Vojin Putniković (SRB)
14 March 2023; 18:30	Report	Zalánki 7	Goals	three players 2	Zagreb; Referees: Georgios Stavridis (GRE), Vojin Putniković (SRB)

14 March 2023; 20:30	Report	Italy	16–10	United States	Zagreb; Referees: Veselin Mišković (MNE), David Gómez (ESP)
14 March 2023; 20:30	Report	Score by quarters: 1–1, 4–2, 4–1, 7–6			Zagreb; Referees: Veselin Mišković (MNE), David Gómez (ESP)
14 March 2023; 20:30	Report	Di Somma 5	Goals	Hallock 3	Zagreb; Referees: Veselin Mišković (MNE), David Gómez (ESP)

=== Group B ===
Pos	Team	Pld	W	PW	PL	L	GF	GA	GD	Pts	Qualification or relegation
1	Spain	5	4	0	1	0	68	41	+27	13	Super final
2	Greece	5	3	0	0	2	68	45	+23	9	Super final
3	Serbia	5	2	1	1	1	55	51	+4	9	Super final
4	Montenegro (H)	5	3	0	0	2	48	51	−3	9	
5	Georgia	5	1	1	0	3	53	73	−20	5	
6	Australia	5	0	0	0	5	42	73	−31	0	Division 2

Source: World Aquatics
Rules for classification: 1) points; 2) goal difference; 3) head-to-head result.
(H) Host

All times are local (UTC+1).

8 March 2023; 15:30	Report	Australia	6–10	Serbia	Podgorica; Referees: Darren Spiritosanto (USA), Julien Bourges (FRA)
8 March 2023; 15:30	Report	Score by quarters: 2–1, 1–3, 0–3, 3–3			Podgorica; Referees: Darren Spiritosanto (USA), Julien Bourges (FRA)
8 March 2023; 15:30	Report	Edwards, Pavillard 2	Goals	Stanojević 3	Podgorica; Referees: Darren Spiritosanto (USA), Julien Bourges (FRA)

8 March 2023; 17:30	Report	Greece	8–11	Spain	Podgorica; Referees: Frank Ohme (GER), Alessandro Severo (ITA)
8 March 2023; 17:30	Report	Score by quarters: 3–2, 3–3, 1–2, 1–4			Podgorica; Referees: Frank Ohme (GER), Alessandro Severo (ITA)
8 March 2023; 17:30	Report	Fountoulis 2	Goals	Munárriz 5	Podgorica; Referees: Frank Ohme (GER), Alessandro Severo (ITA)

8 March 2023; 19:30	Report	Montenegro	13–12	Georgia	Podgorica; Referees: Nóra Debreceni (HUN), Andrej Franulović (CRO)
8 March 2023; 19:30	Report	Score by quarters: 1–3, 5–5, 3–0, 4–4			Podgorica; Referees: Nóra Debreceni (HUN), Andrej Franulović (CRO)
8 March 2023; 19:30	Report	Đu. Radović 4	Goals	Shushiashvili, Vasić 3	Podgorica; Referees: Nóra Debreceni (HUN), Andrej Franulović (CRO)

9 March 2023; 17:30	Report	Montenegro	6–10	Spain	Podgorica; Referees: Nóra Debreceni (HUN), Frank Ohme (GER)
9 March 2023; 17:30	Report	Score by quarters: 0–1, 2–5, 3–2, 1–2			Podgorica; Referees: Nóra Debreceni (HUN), Frank Ohme (GER)
9 March 2023; 17:30	Report	Averka 2	Goals	Tahull 3	Podgorica; Referees: Nóra Debreceni (HUN), Frank Ohme (GER)

9 March 2023; 19:30	Report	Georgia	13–12	Australia	Podgorica; Referees: Julien Bourges (FRA), Kazuzo Moribayashi (JPN)
9 March 2023; 19:30	Report	Score by quarters: 1–2, 2–2, 7–4, 3–4			Podgorica; Referees: Julien Bourges (FRA), Kazuzo Moribayashi (JPN)
9 March 2023; 19:30	Report	Jelača 3	Goals	Pavillard 5	Podgorica; Referees: Julien Bourges (FRA), Kazuzo Moribayashi (JPN)

10 March 2023; 17:30	Report	Spain	20–10	Georgia	Podgorica; Referees: Nóra Debreceni (HUN), Andrej Franulović (CRO)
10 March 2023; 17:30	Report	Score by quarters: 6–2, 6–1, 6–2, 2–5			Podgorica; Referees: Nóra Debreceni (HUN), Andrej Franulović (CRO)
10 March 2023; 17:30	Report	four players 3	Goals	Magrakvelidze, Shushiashvili 3	Podgorica; Referees: Nóra Debreceni (HUN), Andrej Franulović (CRO)

10 March 2023; 19:30	Report	Serbia	14–16	Greece	Podgorica; Referees: Frank Ohme (GER), Darren Spiritosanto (USA)
10 March 2023; 19:30	Report	Score by quarters: 2–4, 1–4, 6–5, 5–3			Podgorica; Referees: Frank Ohme (GER), Darren Spiritosanto (USA)
10 March 2023; 19:30	Report	Rašović 5	Goals	four players 3	Podgorica; Referees: Frank Ohme (GER), Darren Spiritosanto (USA)

11 March 2023; 17:30	Report	Montenegro	9–11	Serbia	Podgorica; Referees: Tamás Kovács-Csatlós (HUN), Adrian Alexandrescu (ROU)
11 March 2023; 17:30	Report	Score by quarters: 2–2, 3–3, 2–5, 2–1			Podgorica; Referees: Tamás Kovács-Csatlós (HUN), Adrian Alexandrescu (ROU)
11 March 2023; 17:30	Report	three players 2	Goals	Radulović 3	Podgorica; Referees: Tamás Kovács-Csatlós (HUN), Adrian Alexandrescu (ROU)

11 March 2023; 19:30	Report	Greece	20–5	Australia	Podgorica; Referees: Sébastien Dervieux (FRA), Nenad Periš (CRO)
11 March 2023; 19:30	Report	Score by quarters: 7–0, 3–1, 3–2, 7–2			Podgorica; Referees: Sébastien Dervieux (FRA), Nenad Periš (CRO)
11 March 2023; 19:30	Report	Papanastasiou 5	Goals	five players 1	Podgorica; Referees: Sébastien Dervieux (FRA), Nenad Periš (CRO)

12 March 2023; 17:30	Report	Montenegro	12–11	Australia	Podgorica; Referees: Darren Spiritosanto (USA), Adrian Alexandrescu (ROU)
12 March 2023; 17:30	Report	Score by quarters: 2–2, 4–4, 4–5, 2–0			Podgorica; Referees: Darren Spiritosanto (USA), Adrian Alexandrescu (ROU)
12 March 2023; 17:30	Report	Perković 3	Goals	Power 3	Podgorica; Referees: Darren Spiritosanto (USA), Adrian Alexandrescu (ROU)

12 March 2023; 19:30	Report	Spain	13–14 (PSO)	Serbia	Podgorica; Referees: Raffaele Colombo (ITA), Nenad Periš (CRO)
12 March 2023; 19:30	Report	Score by quarters: 3–0, 2–5, 2–2, 2–2 PSO: 4–5			Podgorica; Referees: Raffaele Colombo (ITA), Nenad Periš (CRO)
12 March 2023; 19:30	Report	Sanahuja 5	Goals	Mandić 4	Podgorica; Referees: Raffaele Colombo (ITA), Nenad Periš (CRO)

13 March 2023; 17:30	Report	Greece	17–7	Georgia	Podgorica; Referees: Sébastien Dervieux (FRA), Raffaele Colombo (ITA)
13 March 2023; 17:30	Report	Score by quarters: 3–2, 6–1, 3–2, 5–2			Podgorica; Referees: Sébastien Dervieux (FRA), Raffaele Colombo (ITA)
13 March 2023; 17:30	Report	Skoumpakis 3	Goals	Dzikhtsiarenka, Magrakvelidze 2	Podgorica; Referees: Sébastien Dervieux (FRA), Raffaele Colombo (ITA)

13 March 2023; 19:30	Report	Australia	8–18	Spain	Podgorica; Referees: Tamás Kovács-Csatlós (HUN), Kazuzo Moribayashi (JPN)
13 March 2023; 19:30	Report	Score by quarters: 1–3, 2–4, 3–5, 2–6			Podgorica; Referees: Tamás Kovács-Csatlós (HUN), Kazuzo Moribayashi (JPN)
13 March 2023; 19:30	Report	Power 2	Goals	Munárriz 5	Podgorica; Referees: Tamás Kovács-Csatlós (HUN), Kazuzo Moribayashi (JPN)

14 March 2023; 17:30	Report	Georgia	23–22 (PSO)	Serbia	Podgorica; Referees: Nenad Periš (CRO), Darren Spiritosanto (USA)
14 March 2023; 17:30	Report	Score by quarters: 4–2, 2–3, 2–3, 3–3 PSO: 12–11			Podgorica; Referees: Nenad Periš (CRO), Darren Spiritosanto (USA)
14 March 2023; 17:30	Report	Shushiashvili, Vasić 5	Goals	Mandić, Vučinić 5	Podgorica; Referees: Nenad Periš (CRO), Darren Spiritosanto (USA)

14 March 2023; 19:30	Report	Montenegro	8–7	Greece	Podgorica; Referees: Adrian Alexandrescu (ROU), Tamás Kovács-Csatlós (HUN)
14 March 2023; 19:30	Report	Score by quarters: 3–3, 2–2, 2–1, 1–1			Podgorica; Referees: Adrian Alexandrescu (ROU), Tamás Kovács-Csatlós (HUN)
14 March 2023; 19:30	Report	V. Radović 2	Goals	Fountoulis 3	Podgorica; Referees: Adrian Alexandrescu (ROU), Tamás Kovács-Csatlós (HUN)

== Division 2 ==
The draw was held on 13 April 2023. The tournament took place in Berlin, Germany between 5 and 7 May 2023.

All times are local (UTC+2).

=== Group A ===
Pos	Team	Pld	W	PW	PL	L	GF	GA	GD	Pts	Qualification
1	Germany (H)	3	3	0	0	0	56	23	+33	9	Crossover
2	China	3	2	0	0	1	45	28	+17	6	Crossover
3	Malta	3	1	0	0	2	26	41	−15	3	
4	South Africa	3	0	0	0	3	21	56	−35	0	

Source: World Aquatics
Rules for classification: 1) points; 2) goal difference; 3) head-to-head result.
(H) Host

5 May 2023; 11:30	Report	China	16–6	South Africa	Berlin; Referees: John Waldow (NZL), Viktor Salnichenko (KAZ)
5 May 2023; 11:30	Report	Score by quarters: 4–2, 5–0, 4–0, 3–4			Berlin; Referees: John Waldow (NZL), Viktor Salnichenko (KAZ)
5 May 2023; 11:30	Report	Zhang C. 5	Goals	Stone, Swanepoel 2	Berlin; Referees: John Waldow (NZL), Viktor Salnichenko (KAZ)

5 May 2023; 13:00	Report	Germany	15–5	Malta	Berlin; Referees: Mihail Bălănescu (ROU), Masoud Rezvani (IRI)
5 May 2023; 13:00	Report	Score by quarters: 5–2, 3–2, 2–1, 5–0			Berlin; Referees: Mihail Bălănescu (ROU), Masoud Rezvani (IRI)
5 May 2023; 13:00	Report	Bozic 4	Goals	N. Zammit 3	Berlin; Referees: Mihail Bălănescu (ROU), Masoud Rezvani (IRI)

5 May 2023; 19:00	Report	China	18–6	Malta	Berlin; Referees: Masoud Rezvani (IRI), John Waldow (NZL)
5 May 2023; 19:00	Report	Score by quarters: 5–2, 5–0, 4–3, 4–1			Berlin; Referees: Masoud Rezvani (IRI), John Waldow (NZL)
5 May 2023; 19:00	Report	Zhang C. 5	Goals	Plumpton, D. Zammit 2	Berlin; Referees: Masoud Rezvani (IRI), John Waldow (NZL)

5 May 2023; 20:30	Report	Germany	25–7	South Africa	Berlin; Referees: Viktor Salnichenko (KAZ), Mihail Bălănescu (ROU)
5 May 2023; 20:30	Report	Score by quarters: 7–1, 5–3, 5–2, 8–1			Berlin; Referees: Viktor Salnichenko (KAZ), Mihail Bălănescu (ROU)
5 May 2023; 20:30	Report	Chiru 6	Goals	Bungane, Swanepoel 2	Berlin; Referees: Viktor Salnichenko (KAZ), Mihail Bălănescu (ROU)

6 May 2023; 14:00	Report	Malta	15–8	South Africa	Berlin; Referees: Mihail Bălănescu (ROU), Viktor Salnichenko (KAZ)
6 May 2023; 14:00	Report	Score by quarters: 3–4, 5–3, 5–1, 2–0			Berlin; Referees: Mihail Bălănescu (ROU), Viktor Salnichenko (KAZ)
6 May 2023; 14:00	Report	A. Galea, Gialanze 3	Goals	Swanepoel 2	Berlin; Referees: Mihail Bălănescu (ROU), Viktor Salnichenko (KAZ)

6 May 2023; 19:15	Report	Germany	16–11	China	Berlin; Referees: Ursula Wengenroth (SUI), John Waldow (NZL)
6 May 2023; 19:15	Report	Score by quarters: 6–2, 3–5, 5–2, 2–2			Berlin; Referees: Ursula Wengenroth (SUI), John Waldow (NZL)
6 May 2023; 19:15	Report	Bozic, Strelezkij 4	Goals	Chen 5	Berlin; Referees: Ursula Wengenroth (SUI), John Waldow (NZL)

=== Group B ===
Pos	Team	Pld	W	PW	PL	L	GF	GA	GD	Pts	Qualification
1	Romania	3	3	0	0	0	50	16	+34	9	Crossover
2	Kazakhstan	3	2	0	0	1	22	34	−12	6	Crossover
3	Iran	3	1	0	0	2	27	36	−9	3	
4	New Zealand	3	0	0	0	3	30	43	−13	0	

Source: World Aquatics
Rules for classification: 1) points; 2) goal difference; 3) head-to-head result.

5 May 2023; 08:30	Report	Romania	15–4	Iran	Berlin; Referees: Zhang Liang (CHN), Sander Gransjean (NED)
5 May 2023; 08:30	Report	Score by quarters: 3–0, 6–2, 4–1, 2–1			Berlin; Referees: Zhang Liang (CHN), Sander Gransjean (NED)
5 May 2023; 08:30	Report	three players 3	Goals	Mehri 2	Berlin; Referees: Zhang Liang (CHN), Sander Gransjean (NED)

5 May 2023; 10:00	Report	New Zealand	9–10	Kazakhstan	Berlin; Referees: Massimo Angileri (MLT), Dasch Barber (RSA)
5 May 2023; 10:00	Report	Score by quarters: 2–3, 3–2, 2–1, 2–4			Berlin; Referees: Massimo Angileri (MLT), Dasch Barber (RSA)
5 May 2023; 10:00	Report	Ogilvie-Lee, Wicken 3	Goals	Shakenov 4	Berlin; Referees: Massimo Angileri (MLT), Dasch Barber (RSA)

5 May 2023; 16:00	Report	Romania	19–5	Kazakhstan	Berlin; Referees: Sander Gransjean (NED), Hendrik Schopp (GER)
5 May 2023; 16:00	Report	Score by quarters: 6–2, 6–1, 2–2, 5–0			Berlin; Referees: Sander Gransjean (NED), Hendrik Schopp (GER)
5 May 2023; 16:00	Report	Fulea 4	Goals	Akhmetov 3	Berlin; Referees: Sander Gransjean (NED), Hendrik Schopp (GER)

5 May 2023; 17:30	Report	New Zealand	14–17	Iran	Berlin; Referees: Massimo Angileri (MLT), Ursula Wengenroth (SUI)
5 May 2023; 17:30	Report	Score by quarters: 2–5, 2–4, 6–3, 4–5			Berlin; Referees: Massimo Angileri (MLT), Ursula Wengenroth (SUI)
5 May 2023; 17:30	Report	Wicken 4	Goals	Rostamian 5	Berlin; Referees: Massimo Angileri (MLT), Ursula Wengenroth (SUI)

6 May 2023; 15:45	Report	New Zealand	7–16	Romania	Berlin; Referees: Hendrik Schopp (GER), Zhang Liang (CHN)
6 May 2023; 15:45	Report	Score by quarters: 0–4, 4–5, 2–3, 1–4			Berlin; Referees: Hendrik Schopp (GER), Zhang Liang (CHN)
6 May 2023; 15:45	Report	three players 2	Goals	Vancsik 4	Berlin; Referees: Hendrik Schopp (GER), Zhang Liang (CHN)

6 May 2023; 17:30	Report	Kazakhstan	7–6	Iran	Berlin; Referees: Sander Gransjean (NED), Dasch Barber (RSA)
6 May 2023; 17:30	Report	Score by quarters: 1–2, 2–3, 3–0, 1–1			Berlin; Referees: Sander Gransjean (NED), Dasch Barber (RSA)
6 May 2023; 17:30	Report	Tsoy 3	Goals	Almasi 3	Berlin; Referees: Sander Gransjean (NED), Dasch Barber (RSA)

=== Classification games ===
7 May 2023; 15:45	Report	New Zealand	7–9	South Africa	Berlin; Referees: Hendrik Schopp (GER), Mihail Bălănescu (ROU)
7 May 2023; 15:45	Report	Score by quarters: 1–3, 1–1, 2–3, 3–2			Berlin; Referees: Hendrik Schopp (GER), Mihail Bălănescu (ROU)
7 May 2023; 15:45	Report	Wicken 4	Goals	Faber 3	Berlin; Referees: Hendrik Schopp (GER), Mihail Bălănescu (ROU)

7 May 2023; 14:00	Report	Iran	15–9	Malta	Berlin; Referees: Viktor Salnichenko (KAZ), Dasch Barber (RSA)
7 May 2023; 14:00	Report	Score by quarters: 2–2, 4–3, 3–0, 6–4			Berlin; Referees: Viktor Salnichenko (KAZ), Dasch Barber (RSA)
7 May 2023; 14:00	Report	Yazdankhah 5	Goals	A. Galea 4	Berlin; Referees: Viktor Salnichenko (KAZ), Dasch Barber (RSA)

=== Crossover ===
The winners qualified for the super final.

7 May 2023; 17:30	Report	Romania	18–9	China	Berlin; Referees: Masoud Rezvani (IRI), Sander Gransjean (NED)
7 May 2023; 17:30	Report	Score by quarters: 5–1, 5–1, 3–3, 5–4			Berlin; Referees: Masoud Rezvani (IRI), Sander Gransjean (NED)
7 May 2023; 17:30	Report	three players 3	Goals	Zhang C. 4	Berlin; Referees: Masoud Rezvani (IRI), Sander Gransjean (NED)

7 May 2023; 19:15	Report	Germany	12–1	Kazakhstan	Berlin; Referees: Zhang Liang (CHN), Ursula Wengenroth (SUI)
7 May 2023; 19:15	Report	Score by quarters: 3–0, 0–0, 7–1, 2–0			Berlin; Referees: Zhang Liang (CHN), Ursula Wengenroth (SUI)
7 May 2023; 19:15	Report	Chiru, Gansen 3	Goals	Shakenov 1	Berlin; Referees: Zhang Liang (CHN), Ursula Wengenroth (SUI)

== Super final ==
2023 World Aquatics Men's Water Polo World Cup
Tournament details
- Host country: United States
- Venue: 1 (in 1 host city)
- Dates: 30 June – 2 July
- Teams: 8 (from 2 confederations)

Tournament statistics
- Matches played: 12
- Goals scored: 262 (21.83 per match)

Awards
- Best player: (Italy) Edoardo Di Somma
- Best goalkeeper: (Spain) Unai Aguirre

The tournament took place at the University of Southern California in Los Angeles, United States between 30 June and 2 July 2023. The quarterfinal matchups were announced on 7 May 2023.

=== Bracket ===
Quarter-finals
30 June
Germany	9
Spain	18
30 June
Hungary	6
Greece	4
30 June
Italy	20
Romania	2
30 June
Serbia	9
United States	10

Semi-finals
1 July
Spain	10
Hungary	8
1 July
Italy	15
United States	12

Final
2 July
Spain	10
Italy	4
Third place
2 July
Hungary	13
United States	14

Fifth place bracket

5–8th place semifinals
1 July
Germany	6
Greece	19
1 July
Romania	17
Serbia	14

Fifth place
2 July
Greece	11
Romania	8
Seventh place
2 July
Germany	8
Serbia	15

All times are local (UTC−7).

=== Quarterfinals ===
30 June 2023; 13:00	Report	Germany	9–18	Spain	Los Angeles; Referees: Mihai Balanescu (ROU), Levon Dermendjian (USA)
30 June 2023; 13:00	Report	Score by quarters: 2–6, 2–3, 2–5, 3–4			Los Angeles; Referees: Mihai Balanescu (ROU), Levon Dermendjian (USA)
30 June 2023; 13:00	Report	Cuk 3	Goals	Munárriz 5	Los Angeles; Referees: Mihai Balanescu (ROU), Levon Dermendjian (USA)

30 June 2023; 15:00	Report	Italy	20–2	Romania	Los Angeles; Referees: Gernot Häntschel (GER), György Kun (HUN)
30 June 2023; 15:00	Report	Score by quarters: 5–0, 5–1, 5–0, 5–1			Los Angeles; Referees: Gernot Häntschel (GER), György Kun (HUN)
30 June 2023; 15:00	Report	five players 3	Goals	Fulea, Neamtu 1	Los Angeles; Referees: Gernot Häntschel (GER), György Kun (HUN)

30 June 2023; 17:00	Report	Hungary	6–4	Greece	Los Angeles; Referees: Stanko Ivanovski (MNE), Alessandro Severo (ITA)
30 June 2023; 17:00	Report	Score by quarters: 2–2, 1–0, 1–2, 2–0			Los Angeles; Referees: Stanko Ivanovski (MNE), Alessandro Severo (ITA)
30 June 2023; 17:00	Report	Jansik, Varga 2	Goals	four players 1	Los Angeles; Referees: Stanko Ivanovski (MNE), Alessandro Severo (ITA)

30 June 2023; 19:00	Report	Serbia	9–10	United States	Los Angeles; Referees: Nikolaos Boudramsi (GRE), Xevi Buch (ESP)
30 June 2023; 19:00	Report	Score by quarters: 5–3, 1–0, 3–3, 0–4			Los Angeles; Referees: Nikolaos Boudramsi (GRE), Xevi Buch (ESP)
30 June 2023; 19:00	Report	Rašović 4	Goals	Irving 3	Los Angeles; Referees: Nikolaos Boudramsi (GRE), Xevi Buch (ESP)

=== 5th–8th place semifinals ===
1 July 2023; 13:00	Report	Germany	6–19	Greece	Los Angeles; Referees: Mihai Balanescu (ROU), Levon Dermendjian (USA)
1 July 2023; 13:00	Report	Score by quarters: 0–3, 2–4, 2–6, 2–6			Los Angeles; Referees: Mihai Balanescu (ROU), Levon Dermendjian (USA)
1 July 2023; 13:00	Report	Sekulic, Strelezkij 2	Goals	three players 3	Los Angeles; Referees: Mihai Balanescu (ROU), Levon Dermendjian (USA)

1 July 2023; 15:00	Report	Romania	17–14	Serbia	Los Angeles; Referees: Gernot Häntschel (GER), Alessandro Severo (ITA)
1 July 2023; 15:00	Report	Score by quarters: 7–4, 3–3, 3–4, 4–3			Los Angeles; Referees: Gernot Häntschel (GER), Alessandro Severo (ITA)
1 July 2023; 15:00	Report	Fulea 5	Goals	Radulović 7	Los Angeles; Referees: Gernot Häntschel (GER), Alessandro Severo (ITA)

=== Semifinals ===
1 July 2023; 17:00	Report	Spain	10–8	Hungary	Los Angeles; Referees: Nikolaos Boudramsi (GRE), Ivan Raković (SRB)
1 July 2023; 17:00	Report	Score by quarters: 1–0, 4–3, 4–1, 1–4			Los Angeles; Referees: Nikolaos Boudramsi (GRE), Ivan Raković (SRB)
1 July 2023; 17:00	Report	Munárriz 3	Goals	Angyal, Vámos 2	Los Angeles; Referees: Nikolaos Boudramsi (GRE), Ivan Raković (SRB)

1 July 2023; 19:00	Report	Italy	15–12	United States	Los Angeles; Referees: Stanko Ivanovski (MNE), Mikhail Dykman (CAN)
1 July 2023; 19:00	Report	Score by quarters: 3–3, 3–3, 6–3, 3–3			Los Angeles; Referees: Stanko Ivanovski (MNE), Mikhail Dykman (CAN)
1 July 2023; 19:00	Report	Di Somma 5	Goals	Bowen, Daube 4	Los Angeles; Referees: Stanko Ivanovski (MNE), Mikhail Dykman (CAN)

=== Seventh place game ===
2 July 2023; 13:00	Report	Germany	8–15	Serbia	Los Angeles; Referees: Levon Dermendjian (USA), Mikhail Dykman (CAN)
2 July 2023; 13:00	Report	Score by quarters: 1–3, 3–2, 2–7, 2–3			Los Angeles; Referees: Levon Dermendjian (USA), Mikhail Dykman (CAN)
2 July 2023; 13:00	Report	Schütze 2	Goals	three players 3	Los Angeles; Referees: Levon Dermendjian (USA), Mikhail Dykman (CAN)

=== Fifth place game ===
2 July 2023; 15:00	Report	Greece	11–8	Romania	Los Angeles; Referees: Ivan Raković (SRB), György Kun (HUN)
2 July 2023; 15:00	Report	Score by quarters: 1–2, 1–3, 4–1, 5–2			Los Angeles; Referees: Ivan Raković (SRB), György Kun (HUN)
2 July 2023; 15:00	Report	Genidounias 4	Goals	Colodrovschi, Fulea 2	Los Angeles; Referees: Ivan Raković (SRB), György Kun (HUN)

=== Bronze medal game ===
2 July 2023; 17:00	Report	Hungary	13–14	United States	Los Angeles; Referees: Xevi Buch (ESP), Alessandro Severo (ITA)
2 July 2023; 17:00	Report	Score by quarters: 5–6, 3–3, 4–1, 1–4			Los Angeles; Referees: Xevi Buch (ESP), Alessandro Severo (ITA)
2 July 2023; 17:00	Report	Varga 3	Goals	Irving 4	Los Angeles; Referees: Xevi Buch (ESP), Alessandro Severo (ITA)

=== Gold medal game ===
2 July 2023; 19:00	Report	Spain	10–4	Italy	Los Angeles; Referees: Nikolaos Boudramsi (GRE), Stanko Ivanovski (MNE)
2 July 2023; 19:00	Report	Score by quarters: 5–1, 2–2, 3–1, 0–0			Los Angeles; Referees: Nikolaos Boudramsi (GRE), Stanko Ivanovski (MNE)
2 July 2023; 19:00	Report	Granados 4	Goals	four players 1	Los Angeles; Referees: Nikolaos Boudramsi (GRE), Stanko Ivanovski (MNE)

== Final standings ==
Rank	Team
Gold medal	Spain
Silver medal	Italy
Bronze medal	United States
4	Hungary
5	Greece
6	Romania
7	Serbia
8	Germany

2023 FINA Men's Water Polo World Cup

Spain
First title

Team roster

Unai Aguirre (GK), Alberto Munárriz, Álvaro Granados, Bernat Sanahuja, Miguel de Toro, Marc Larumbe, Martin Faměra, Sergi Cabanas, Felipe Perrone (c), Blai Mallarach, Alejandro Bustos, Eduardo Lorrio (GK), Alberto Barroso, Fran Valera Head coach: David Martín.

== See also ==
- 2023 World Aquatics Women's Water Polo World Cup
