= 2020 Women's Water Polo Olympic Qualification Tournament =

Tokyo 2020 Olympic Qualification Tournament in Trieste, Italy

Tournament details
- Host country: Italy
- Venue: 1 (in 1 host city)
- Dates: 19–24 January 2021
- Teams: 8 (from 2 confederations)

Final positions
- Champions: Hungary
- Runners-up: Netherlands
- Third place: Greece
- Fourth place: Italy

Tournament statistics
- Matches played: 24
- Goals scored: 515 (21.46 per match)
- Top scorers: (Hungary) Rita Keszthelyi (28 goals)

The 2020 Women's Water Polo Olympic Qualification Tournament took place in Trieste, Italy. The top two teams advanced to the Olympics.

The tournament was scheduled to take place in March and then from 17 to 24 May 2020, but was postponed due to the COVID-19 pandemic. It then took place from 19 to 24 January 2021 and was held behind closed doors.

Due to their semifinal win, both Hungary and the Netherlands qualified for the Olympics.

== Participants ==
Means of qualification	Date	Venue	Berths	Qualified
Host nation	—	—	1	Italy
2020 European Championship	12–25 January 2020	Hungary	6	Hungary
2020 European Championship	12–25 January 2020	Hungary	6	Netherlands
2020 European Championship	12–25 January 2020	Hungary	6	Greece
2020 European Championship	12–25 January 2020	Hungary	6	France
2020 European Championship	12–25 January 2020	Hungary	6	Slovakia
2020 European Championship	12–25 January 2020	Hungary	6	Israel
Oceanian Continental Selection	—	—	~~1~~ 0	~~New Zealand~~
2018 Asian Games	16–21 August 2018	(Indonesia) Jakarta	1	Kazakhstan
Wild card	19 February 2020	—	~~1~~ 0	~~Uzbekistan~~
Total			~~10~~ 8	

== Draw ==
The draw took place on 11 February 2020 in Lausanne, Switzerland.

Group A	Group B
Netherlands; France; Italy; ~~Uzbekistan~~; Slovakia	Greece; Hungary; Israel; ~~New Zealand~~; Kazakhstan

== Preliminary round ==
All times are local (UTC+1).

=== Group A ===
Pos	Team	Pld	W	D	L	GF	GA	GD	Pts
1	Italy (H)	3	2	1	0	52	17	+35	5
2	Netherlands	3	2	1	0	44	15	+29	5
3	France	3	1	0	2	29	43	−14	2
4	Slovakia	3	0	0	3	15	65	−50	0

Source: Microplustiming
Rules for classification: 1) points; 2) head-to-head points; 3) head-to-head goal difference; 4) head-to-head number of goals scored; 5) goal difference.
(H) Hosts

19 January 2021; 18:00	Report	France	6–19	Italy	Bruno Bianchi Aquatic Center, Trieste; Referees: Nenad Periš (CRO), Adil Aimbetov (KAZ)
19 January 2021; 18:00	Report	Score by quarters: 1–5, 0–5, 2–3, 3–6			Bruno Bianchi Aquatic Center, Trieste; Referees: Nenad Periš (CRO), Adil Aimbetov (KAZ)
19 January 2021; 18:00	Report	Bouloukbachi, Dhalluin 2	Goals	Palmieri 5	Bruno Bianchi Aquatic Center, Trieste; Referees: Nenad Periš (CRO), Adil Aimbetov (KAZ)

19 January 2021; 20:00	Report	Netherlands	22–2	Slovakia	Bruno Bianchi Aquatic Center, Trieste; Referees: Asumi Tsuzaki (JPN), Georgios Stavridis (GRE)
19 January 2021; 20:00	Report	Score by quarters: 6–0, 4–0, 8–0, 4–2			Bruno Bianchi Aquatic Center, Trieste; Referees: Asumi Tsuzaki (JPN), Georgios Stavridis (GRE)
19 January 2021; 20:00	Report	Keuning 6	Goals	Kačková, Sedláková 1	Bruno Bianchi Aquatic Center, Trieste; Referees: Asumi Tsuzaki (JPN), Georgios Stavridis (GRE)

20 January 2021; 18:00	Report	Netherlands	7–7	Italy	Bruno Bianchi Aquatic Center, Trieste; Referees: Boris Margeta (SLO), Nenad Peris (CRO)
20 January 2021; 18:00	Report	Score by quarters: 2–1, 1–2, 3–3, 1–1			Bruno Bianchi Aquatic Center, Trieste; Referees: Boris Margeta (SLO), Nenad Peris (CRO)
20 January 2021; 18:00	Report	Van de Kraats 2	Goals	Marletta, Tabani 2	Bruno Bianchi Aquatic Center, Trieste; Referees: Boris Margeta (SLO), Nenad Peris (CRO)

20 January 2021; 20:00	Report	France	17–9	Slovakia	Bruno Bianchi Aquatic Center, Trieste; Referees: Gabriella Várkonyi (HUN), Matan Schwartz (ISR)
20 January 2021; 20:00	Report	Score by quarters: 5–2, 1–5, 6–1, 5–1			Bruno Bianchi Aquatic Center, Trieste; Referees: Gabriella Várkonyi (HUN), Matan Schwartz (ISR)
20 January 2021; 20:00	Report	Guillet 5	Goals	Pecková 3	Bruno Bianchi Aquatic Center, Trieste; Referees: Gabriella Várkonyi (HUN), Matan Schwartz (ISR)

21 January 2021; 16:00	Report	France	6–15	Netherlands	Bruno Bianchi Aquatic Center, Trieste; Referees: Adil Aimbetov (KAZ), Matan Schwartz (ISR)
21 January 2021; 16:00	Report	Score by quarters: 2–8, 2–1, 2–3, 0–3			Bruno Bianchi Aquatic Center, Trieste; Referees: Adil Aimbetov (KAZ), Matan Schwartz (ISR)
21 January 2021; 16:00	Report	Mahieu, Millot 2	Goals	Genee, Van de Kraats 4	Bruno Bianchi Aquatic Center, Trieste; Referees: Adil Aimbetov (KAZ), Matan Schwartz (ISR)

21 January 2021; 18:00	Report	Italy	26–4	Slovakia	Bruno Bianchi Aquatic Center, Trieste; Referees: Georgios Stavridis (GRE), Gabriella Várkonyi (HUN)
21 January 2021; 18:00	Report	Score by quarters: 6–1, 7–0, 5–2, 8–1			Bruno Bianchi Aquatic Center, Trieste; Referees: Georgios Stavridis (GRE), Gabriella Várkonyi (HUN)
21 January 2021; 18:00	Report	Palmieri, Queirolo 5	Goals	Stankovianska 3	Bruno Bianchi Aquatic Center, Trieste; Referees: Georgios Stavridis (GRE), Gabriella Várkonyi (HUN)

=== Group B ===
Pos	Team	Pld	W	D	L	GF	GA	GD	Pts
1	Greece	3	3	0	0	41	11	+30	6
2	Hungary	3	2	0	1	55	16	+39	4
3	Kazakhstan	3	0	1	2	18	43	−25	1
4	Israel	3	0	1	2	10	54	−44	1

Source: Microplustiming
Rules for classification: 1) points; 2) head-to-head points; 3) head-to-head goal difference; 4) head-to-head number of goals scored; 5) goal difference.

19 January 2021; 14:00	Report	Hungary	27–2	Israel	Bruno Bianchi Aquatic Center, Trieste; Referees: Sander Gransjean (NED), Alessandro Severo (ITA)
19 January 2021; 14:00	Report	Score by quarters: 7–2, 3–0, 9–0, 8–0			Bruno Bianchi Aquatic Center, Trieste; Referees: Sander Gransjean (NED), Alessandro Severo (ITA)
19 January 2021; 14:00	Report	Keszthelyi 5	Goals	Futorian, Yaacobi 1	Bruno Bianchi Aquatic Center, Trieste; Referees: Sander Gransjean (NED), Alessandro Severo (ITA)

19 January 2021; 16:00	Report	Greece	13–5	Kazakhstan	Bruno Bianchi Aquatic Center, Trieste; Referees: Svetlana Dreval (RUS), Boris Margeta (SLO)
19 January 2021; 16:00	Report	Score by quarters: 4–1, 4–1, 3–2, 2–1			Bruno Bianchi Aquatic Center, Trieste; Referees: Svetlana Dreval (RUS), Boris Margeta (SLO)
19 January 2021; 16:00	Report	Tsoukala 7	Goals	Khritankova 2	Bruno Bianchi Aquatic Center, Trieste; Referees: Svetlana Dreval (RUS), Boris Margeta (SLO)

20 January 2021; 14:00	Report	Hungary	23–6	Kazakhstan	Bruno Bianchi Aquatic Center, Trieste; Referees: Asumi Tsuzaki (JPN), Alessandro Severo (ITA)
20 January 2021; 14:00	Report	Score by quarters: 7–2, 6–3, 5–1, 5–0			Bruno Bianchi Aquatic Center, Trieste; Referees: Asumi Tsuzaki (JPN), Alessandro Severo (ITA)
20 January 2021; 14:00	Report	Keszthelyi 9	Goals	Murataliyeva, Roga 2	Bruno Bianchi Aquatic Center, Trieste; Referees: Asumi Tsuzaki (JPN), Alessandro Severo (ITA)

20 January 2021; 16:00	Report	Greece	20–1	Israel	Bruno Bianchi Aquatic Center, Trieste; Referees: Svetlana Dreval (RUS), Róbert Horváth (SVK)
20 January 2021; 16:00	Report	Score by quarters: 7–0, 3–0, 5–1, 5–0			Bruno Bianchi Aquatic Center, Trieste; Referees: Svetlana Dreval (RUS), Róbert Horváth (SVK)
20 January 2021; 16:00	Report	E. Plevritou 7	Goals	Hochberg 1	Bruno Bianchi Aquatic Center, Trieste; Referees: Svetlana Dreval (RUS), Róbert Horváth (SVK)

21 January 2021; 14:00	Report	Hungary	5–8	Greece	Bruno Bianchi Aquatic Center, Trieste; Referees: Svetlana Dreval (RUS), Nenad Peris (CRO)
21 January 2021; 14:00	Report	Score by quarters: 1–1, 1–2, 1–3, 2–2			Bruno Bianchi Aquatic Center, Trieste; Referees: Svetlana Dreval (RUS), Nenad Peris (CRO)
21 January 2021; 14:00	Report	five players 1	Goals	E. Plevritou 3	Bruno Bianchi Aquatic Center, Trieste; Referees: Svetlana Dreval (RUS), Nenad Peris (CRO)

21 January 2021; 20:00	Report	Israel	7–7	Kazakhstan	Bruno Bianchi Aquatic Center, Trieste; Referees: Boris Margeta (SLO), Alessandro Severo (ITA)
21 January 2021; 20:00	Report	Score by quarters: 2–2, 1–2, 1–2, 3–1			Bruno Bianchi Aquatic Center, Trieste; Referees: Boris Margeta (SLO), Alessandro Severo (ITA)
21 January 2021; 20:00	Report	Bogachenko 4	Goals	three players 2	Bruno Bianchi Aquatic Center, Trieste; Referees: Boris Margeta (SLO), Alessandro Severo (ITA)

== Knockout stage ==
=== Bracket ===
Quarterfinals
22 January
Netherlands	19
Kazakhstan	6
22 January
Slovakia	3
Greece	22
22 January
France	7
Hungary	20
22 January
Italy	15
Israel	6

Semifinals
23 January
Netherlands	7
Greece	4
23 January
Hungary	13
Italy	10

Final
24 January
Netherlands	11
Hungary	13
Third place
24 January
Greece	10
Italy	4

Fifth place bracket

5–8th place semifinals
23 January
Kazakhstan	11
Slovakia	10
23 January
France	11
Israel	4

Fifth place
24 January
Kazakhstan	10
France	12
Seventh place
24 January
Slovakia	10
Israel	13

=== Quarterfinals ===
22 January 2021; 14:00	Report	Slovakia	3–22	Greece	Bruno Bianchi Aquatic Center, Trieste; Referees: Asumi Tsuzaki (JPN), Matan Schwartz (ISR)
22 January 2021; 14:00	Report	Score by quarters: 1–4, 0–5, 2–7, 0–6			Bruno Bianchi Aquatic Center, Trieste; Referees: Asumi Tsuzaki (JPN), Matan Schwartz (ISR)
22 January 2021; 14:00	Report	three players 1	Goals	Tsoukala 6	Bruno Bianchi Aquatic Center, Trieste; Referees: Asumi Tsuzaki (JPN), Matan Schwartz (ISR)

22 January 2021; 16:00	Report	France	7–20	Hungary	Bruno Bianchi Aquatic Center, Trieste; Referees: Georgios Stavridis (GRE), Sander Gransjean (NED)
22 January 2021; 16:00	Report	Score by quarters: 2–4, 1–3, 2–5, 2–8			Bruno Bianchi Aquatic Center, Trieste; Referees: Georgios Stavridis (GRE), Sander Gransjean (NED)
22 January 2021; 16:00	Report	three players 2	Goals	Keszthelyi 5	Bruno Bianchi Aquatic Center, Trieste; Referees: Georgios Stavridis (GRE), Sander Gransjean (NED)

22 January 2021; 18:00	Report	Italy	15–6	Israel	Bruno Bianchi Aquatic Center, Trieste; Referees: Adil Aimbetov (KAZ), Róbert Horváth (SVK)
22 January 2021; 18:00	Report	Score by quarters: 3–0, 3–1, 7–1, 2–4			Bruno Bianchi Aquatic Center, Trieste; Referees: Adil Aimbetov (KAZ), Róbert Horváth (SVK)
22 January 2021; 18:00	Report	Marletta 4	Goals	Bogachenko, Hochberg 2	Bruno Bianchi Aquatic Center, Trieste; Referees: Adil Aimbetov (KAZ), Róbert Horváth (SVK)

22 January 2021; 20:00	Report	Netherlands	19–6	Kazakhstan	Bruno Bianchi Aquatic Center, Trieste; Referees: Alessandro Severo (ITA), Gabriella Várkonyi (HUN)
22 January 2021; 20:00	Report	Score by quarters: 5–1, 4–2, 4–0, 6–3			Bruno Bianchi Aquatic Center, Trieste; Referees: Alessandro Severo (ITA), Gabriella Várkonyi (HUN)
22 January 2021; 20:00	Report	Van de Kraats 6	Goals	Turova 2	Bruno Bianchi Aquatic Center, Trieste; Referees: Alessandro Severo (ITA), Gabriella Várkonyi (HUN)

=== 5–8th place semifinals ===
23 January 2021; 14:00	Report	Kazakhstan	11–10	Slovakia	Bruno Bianchi Aquatic Center, Trieste; Referees: Gabriella Várkonyi (HUN), Georgios Stavridis (GRE)
23 January 2021; 14:00	Report	Score by quarters: 2–3, 4–2, 1–2, 4–3			Bruno Bianchi Aquatic Center, Trieste; Referees: Gabriella Várkonyi (HUN), Georgios Stavridis (GRE)
23 January 2021; 14:00	Report	Novikova 4	Goals	Stankovianska 4	Bruno Bianchi Aquatic Center, Trieste; Referees: Gabriella Várkonyi (HUN), Georgios Stavridis (GRE)

23 January 2021; 16:00	Report	France	11–4	Israel	Bruno Bianchi Aquatic Center, Trieste; Referees: Asumi Tsuzaki (JPN), Sander Gransjean (NED)
23 January 2021; 16:00	Report	Score by quarters: 2–1, 2–0, 5–2, 2–1			Bruno Bianchi Aquatic Center, Trieste; Referees: Asumi Tsuzaki (JPN), Sander Gransjean (NED)
23 January 2021; 16:00	Report	Guillet, Millot 3	Goals	four players 1	Bruno Bianchi Aquatic Center, Trieste; Referees: Asumi Tsuzaki (JPN), Sander Gransjean (NED)

=== Semifinals ===
23 January 2021; 18:00	Report	Netherlands	7–4	Greece	Bruno Bianchi Aquatic Center, Trieste; Referees: Boris Margeta (SLO), Nenad Periš (CRO)
23 January 2021; 18:00	Report	Score by quarters: 1–2, 2–2, 2–0, 2–0			Bruno Bianchi Aquatic Center, Trieste; Referees: Boris Margeta (SLO), Nenad Periš (CRO)
23 January 2021; 18:00	Report	Megens 3	Goals	four players 1	Bruno Bianchi Aquatic Center, Trieste; Referees: Boris Margeta (SLO), Nenad Periš (CRO)

23 January 2021; 20:00	Report	Hungary	13–10	Italy	Bruno Bianchi Aquatic Center, Trieste; Referees: Svetlana Dreval (RUS), Matan Schwartz (ISR)
23 January 2021; 20:00	Report	Score by quarters: 3–1, 2–2, 4–4, 4–3			Bruno Bianchi Aquatic Center, Trieste; Referees: Svetlana Dreval (RUS), Matan Schwartz (ISR)
23 January 2021; 20:00	Report	Keszthelyi 6	Goals	Marletta 4	Bruno Bianchi Aquatic Center, Trieste; Referees: Svetlana Dreval (RUS), Matan Schwartz (ISR)

=== Seventh place game ===
24 January 2021; 14:00	Report	Slovakia	10–13	Israel	Bruno Bianchi Aquatic Center, Trieste; Referees: Adil Aimbetov (KAZ), Sander Gransjean (NED)
24 January 2021; 14:00	Report	Score by quarters: 1–2, 4–1, 3–5, 2–5			Bruno Bianchi Aquatic Center, Trieste; Referees: Adil Aimbetov (KAZ), Sander Gransjean (NED)
24 January 2021; 14:00	Report	Halocká 4	Goals	Bogachenko, Farkash 3	Bruno Bianchi Aquatic Center, Trieste; Referees: Adil Aimbetov (KAZ), Sander Gransjean (NED)

=== Fifth place game ===
24 January 2021; 16:00	Report	Kazakhstan	10–12	France	Bruno Bianchi Aquatic Center, Trieste; Referees: Matan Schwartz (ISR), Róbert Horváth (SVK)
24 January 2021; 16:00	Report	Score by quarters: 1–3, 3–3, 4–3, 2–3			Bruno Bianchi Aquatic Center, Trieste; Referees: Matan Schwartz (ISR), Róbert Horváth (SVK)
24 January 2021; 16:00	Report	Roga 3	Goals	four players 3	Bruno Bianchi Aquatic Center, Trieste; Referees: Matan Schwartz (ISR), Róbert Horváth (SVK)

=== Third place game ===
24 January 2021; 18:00	Report	Greece	10–4	Italy	Bruno Bianchi Aquatic Center, Trieste; Referees: Nenad Periš (CRO), Gabriella Várkonyi (HUN)
24 January 2021; 18:00	Report	Score by quarters: 4–1, 0–1, 4–1, 2–1			Bruno Bianchi Aquatic Center, Trieste; Referees: Nenad Periš (CRO), Gabriella Várkonyi (HUN)
24 January 2021; 18:00	Report	Tsoukala 4	Goals	Chiappini, Garibotti 2	Bruno Bianchi Aquatic Center, Trieste; Referees: Nenad Periš (CRO), Gabriella Várkonyi (HUN)

=== Final ===
24 January 2021; 20:30	Report	Netherlands	11–13	Hungary	Bruno Bianchi Aquatic Center, Trieste; Referees: Svetlana Dreval (RUS), Alessandro Severo (ITA)
24 January 2021; 20:30	Report	Score by quarters: 3–4, 2–2, 3–5, 3–2			Bruno Bianchi Aquatic Center, Trieste; Referees: Svetlana Dreval (RUS), Alessandro Severo (ITA)
24 January 2021; 20:30	Report	Van de Kraats 5	Goals	Garda 3	Bruno Bianchi Aquatic Center, Trieste; Referees: Svetlana Dreval (RUS), Alessandro Severo (ITA)

== Final ranking ==
Qualified for the Summer Olympics

Rank	Team
1st place, gold medalist(s)	Hungary
2nd place, silver medalist(s)	Netherlands
3rd place, bronze medalist(s)	Greece
4	Italy
5	France
6	Kazakhstan
7	Israel
8	Slovakia

== See also ==
- 2020 Men's Water Polo Olympic Qualification Tournament
