= Asumi Tsuzaki =

Japanese water polo coach, sports official and player

Asumi Tsuzaki (津崎明日美, Tsuzaki Asumi; born 22 March 1989) is a Japanese water polo coach, sports official and former player.

Tsuzaki took the Officials' Oath at the Opening Ceremony of the 2020 Summer Olympics in Tokyo, Japan, becoming the first female water polo referee to be given the honour. During the Games she acted as referee in the women's water polo tournament. On 24 July 2021, Tsuzaki and Ursula Wengenroth of Switzerland officiated the match between South Africa and Spain, which is the first time that two women had officiated an Olympic water polo match.

She was also a referee for the 2020 FINA Women's Water Polo World League in Athens, Greece, along with being a referee for the 2020 Women's Water Polo Olympic Qualification Tournament in Trieste, Italy.

Tsuzaki graduated from Nippon Sport Science University in Tokyo, Japan.
