= Water polo at the 2021 Summer World University Games – Men's tournament =

Water polo tournament

Men's water polo at the Chengdu 2021 FISU World University Games
- Venue: Xindu District Sports Centre Natatorium; Chengdu Modern Pentathlon Centre Swimming & Fencing Hall (finals)
- Dates: 27 July–8 August 2023
- Teams: 11

Medalists
1st place, gold medalist(s)		Italy
2nd place, silver medalist(s)		Hungary
3rd place, bronze medalist(s)		Georgia

Men's water polo at the 2021 Summer Universiade was held in XinduXiangcheng Sports Centre Natatorium and Modern Pentathlon Centre Swimming & Fencing Hall from 27 July to 8 August 2023. The dates of all events were changed due to the COVID pandemic.

== Results ==
All times are local (UTC+08:00).

=== Preliminary round ===
==== Group A ====
Team	Pts	Pld	W	D	L	GF	GA	GD
Hungary	10	4	3	1	0	75	34	41
Germany	9	4	3	0	1	62	35	27
Greece	7	4	2	1	1	68	41	27
Japan	3	4	1	0	3	47	60	−13
Singapore	0	4	0	0	4	16	98	−82

27 July 2023; 10:00	Japan	8–14	Germany	Modern Pentathlon Centre Swimming & Fencing Hall
27 July 2023; 10:00	Score by quarters: 3–6, 1–1, 3–3, 1–4			Modern Pentathlon Centre Swimming & Fencing Hall

27 July 2023; 11:45	Singapore	2–27	Hungary	Modern Pentathlon Centre Swimming & Fencing Hal;
27 July 2023; 11:45	Score by quarters: 0–5, 0–8, 1–5, 1–8			Modern Pentathlon Centre Swimming & Fencing Hal;

29 July 2023; 10:00	Singapore	5–26	Greece	Modern Pentathlon Centre Swimming & Fencing Hall
29 July 2023; 10:00	Score by quarters: 1–1, 1–4, 2–8, 1–7			Modern Pentathlon Centre Swimming & Fencing Hall

29 July 2023; 11:45	Hungary	18–13	Germany	Modern Pentathlon Centre Swimming & Fencing Hall
29 July 2023; 11:45	Score by quarters: 5 – 4, 3–3, 5 – 4, 5 – 2			Modern Pentathlon Centre Swimming & Fencing Hall

30 July 2023; 10:00	Hungary	17–6	Japan	Modern Pentathlon Centre Swimming & Fencing Hall
30 July 2023; 10:00	Score by quarters: 5–1, 4–2, 5–1, 3–2			Modern Pentathlon Centre Swimming & Fencing Hall

30 July 2023; 11:45	Germany	12–7	Greece	Modern Pentathlon Centre Swimming & Fencing Hall
30 July 2023; 11:45	Score by quarters: 2–5, 4–2, 5–0, 1–2			Modern Pentathlon Centre Swimming & Fencing Hall

1 August 2023; 10:00	Germany	23–2	Singapore	Modern Pentathlon Centre Swimming & Fencing Hall
1 August 2023; 10:00	Score by quarters: 5–0, 5–1, 8–0, 5–1			Modern Pentathlon Centre Swimming & Fencing Hall

1 August 2023; 11:45	Greece	22–11	Japan	Modern Pentathlon Centre Swimming & Fencing Hall
1 August 2023; 11:45	Score by quarters: 6–3, 7–3, 3–3, 6–2			Modern Pentathlon Centre Swimming & Fencing Hall

2 August 2023; 10:00	Greece	13–13	Hungary	Modern Pentathlon Centre Swimming & Fencing Hall
2 August 2023; 10:00	Score by quarters: 3–3, 4–4, 3–5, 3–1			Modern Pentathlon Centre Swimming & Fencing Hall

2 August 2023; 11:45	Japan	22–7	Singapore	Modern Pentathlon Centre Swimming & Fencing Hall
2 August 2023; 11:45	Score by quarters: 8–1, 3–3, 5–0, 6–3			Modern Pentathlon Centre Swimming & Fencing Hall

==== Group B ====
Team	Pts	Pld	W	D	L	GF	GA	GD
Italy	15	5	5	0	0	90	37	53
United States	12	6	4	0	1	63	38	25
Georgia	9	5	3	0	2	37	24	13
China	6	5	2	0	3	53	62	−9
Slovakia	3	5	1	0	4	33	73	−40
South Korea	0	0	1	0	5	38	91	−53

27 July 2023; 13:30	Slovakia	11–9	South Korea	Modern Pentathlon Centre Swimming & Fencing Hall
27 July 2023; 13:30	Score by quarters: 2–2, 4–4, 2–1, 3–2			Modern Pentathlon Centre Swimming & Fencing Hall

27 July 2023; 15:15	Italy	13–11	United States	Modern Pentathlon Centre Swimming & Fencing Hall
27 July 2023; 15:15	Score by quarters: 4–5, 3–3, 3–1, 3–2			Modern Pentathlon Centre Swimming & Fencing Hall

27 July 2023; 17:00	China	7–13	Georgia	Modern Pentathlon Centre Swimming & Fencing Hall
27 July 2023; 17:00	Score by quarters: 2–3, 1–5, 2–3, 2–2			Modern Pentathlon Centre Swimming & Fencing Hall

29 July 2023; 13:30	United States	16–3	Slovakia	Modern Pentathlon Centre Swimming & Fencing Hall
29 July 2023; 13:30	Score by quarters: 1–1, 6–1, 5–1, 4–0			Modern Pentathlon Centre Swimming & Fencing Hall

29 July 2023; 15:15	South Korea	7–19	Georgia	Modern Pentathlon Centre Swimming & Fencing Hall
29 July 2023; 15:15	Score by quarters: 0–5, 2–4, 2–5, 3–5			Modern Pentathlon Centre Swimming & Fencing Hall

29 July 2023; 17:00	Italy	17–7	China	Modern Pentathlon Centre Swimming & Fencing Hall
29 July 2023; 17:00	Score by quarters: 3–0, 4–2, 3–3, 7–2			Modern Pentathlon Centre Swimming & Fencing Hall

30 July 2023; 13:30	United States	12–8	China	Modern Pentathlon Centre Swimming & Fencing Hall
30 July 2023; 13:30	Score by quarters: 2–3, 3–2, 3–2, 4–1			Modern Pentathlon Centre Swimming & Fencing Hall

30 July 2023; 15:15	South Korea	4–25	Italy	Modern Pentathlon Centre Swimming & Fencing Hall
30 July 2023; 15:15	Score by quarters: 2–7, 0–5, 2–7, 0–6			Modern Pentathlon Centre Swimming & Fencing Hall

30 July 2023; 17:00	Georgia	14–3	Slovakia	Modern Pentathlon Centre Swimming & Fencing Hall
30 July 2023; 17:00	Score by quarters: 3–1, 3–0, 4–2, 4–0			Modern Pentathlon Centre Swimming & Fencing Hall

1 August 2023; 13:30	Italy	13–9	Georgia	Modern Pentathlon Centre Swimming & Fencing Hall
1 August 2023; 13:30	Score by quarters: 6–2, 1–1, 3–3, 3–3			Modern Pentathlon Centre Swimming & Fencing Hall

1 August 2023; 15:15	Slovakia	10–12	China	Modern Pentathlon Centre Swimming & Fencing Hall
1 August 2023; 15:15	Score by quarters: 3–3, 3–3, 2–3, 2–3			Modern Pentathlon Centre Swimming & Fencing Hall

1 August 2023; 17:00	United States	17–8	South Korea	Modern Pentathlon Centre Swimming & Fencing Hall
1 August 2023; 17:00	Score by quarters: 2–1, 5–2, 5–3, 5–2			Modern Pentathlon Centre Swimming & Fencing Hall

2 August 2023; 13:30	Slovakia	6–22	Italy	Modern Pentathlon Centre Swimming & Fencing Hall
2 August 2023; 13:30	Score by quarters: 1–8, 0–4, 2–5, 3–5			Modern Pentathlon Centre Swimming & Fencing Hall

2 August 2023; 15:15	China	19–10	South Korea	Modern Pentathlon Centre Swimming & Fencing Hall
2 August 2023; 15:15	Score by quarters: 5–1, 3–2, 6–3, 5–4			Modern Pentathlon Centre Swimming & Fencing Hall

2 August 2023; 17:00	Georgia	6–7	United States	Modern Pentathlon Centre Swimming & Fencing Hall
2 August 2023; 17:00	Score by quarters: 1–1, 2–1, 0–2, 3–3			Modern Pentathlon Centre Swimming & Fencing Hall

=== Knock-out stage ===
- 9th to 11th place

Team	Pts	Pld	W	D	L	GF	GA	GD
Slovakia	6	2	2	0	0	19	17	2
South Korea	3	2	1	0	1	26	22	4
Singapore	0	2	0	0	2	17	24	–13

4 August 2023; 11:30	Singapore	10–16	South Korea	Modern Pentathlon Centre Swimming & Fencing Hall
4 August 2023; 11:30	Score by quarters: 1–4, 2–3, 4–5, 3–4			Modern Pentathlon Centre Swimming & Fencing Hall

6 August 2023; 09:00	Singapore	7–8	Slovakia	Modern Pentathlon Centre Swimming & Fencing Hall
6 August 2023; 09:00	Score by quarters: 1–3, 4–2, 1–3, 1– 0			Modern Pentathlon Centre Swimming & Fencing Hall

7 August 2023; 10:00	South Korea	10–11	Slovakia	Modern Pentathlon Centre Swimming & Fencing Hall
7 August 2023; 10:00	Score by quarters: 2-1, 2-3, 3-3, 3-4			Modern Pentathlon Centre Swimming & Fencing Hall

==== Brackets ====
- Main bracket

Quarter-finals
A1	Hungary	19
B4	China	7
A3	Greece	8
B2	United States	10
A2	Germany	15
B3	Georgia	16
A4	Japan	9
B1	Italy	22

Semifinals
Hungary	11
United States	10
Georgia	10
Italy	11

Gold medal final
Hungary	11
Italy	13
Bronze medal final
United States	7
Georgia	12

- 5th to 8th place blacket

Semifinals
China	5
Greece	19
Germany	14
Japan	12

5th place Final
Greece	12
Germany	10
7th place Final
China	9
Japan	7

==== Quarter-finals ====
4 August 2023; 18:30	Hungary	19–7	China	Modern Pentathlon Centre Swimming & Fencing Hall
4 August 2023; 18:30	Score by quarters: 6–1, 5–0, 3-4, 5–2			Modern Pentathlon Centre Swimming & Fencing Hall

4 August 2023; 15:00	Germany	15–16 (PSO)	Georgia	Modern Pentathlon Centre Swimming & Fencing Hall
4 August 2023; 15:00	Score by quarters: 3-3, 1–2, 5-5, 3-2 PSO: 3-4			Modern Pentathlon Centre Swimming & Fencing Hall

4 August 2023; 16:45	Greece	8–10	United States	Modern Pentathlon Centre Swimming & Fencing Hall
4 August 2023; 16:45	Score by quarters: 3–1, 2-4, 3–3, 0-2			Modern Pentathlon Centre Swimming & Fencing Hall

4 August 2023; 18:30	Japan	9–22	Italy	Modern Pentathlon Centre Swimming & Fencing Hall
4 August 2023; 18:30	Score by quarters: 2-4, 3-4, 2-7, 2–7			Modern Pentathlon Centre Swimming & Fencing Hall

==== Semifinals ====
6 August 2023; 14:15	Hungary	11–10	United States	Modern Pentathlon Centre Swimming & Fencing Hall
6 August 2023; 14:15	Score by quarters: 3-2, 5-1, 3-2, 0-5			Modern Pentathlon Centre Swimming & Fencing Hall

6 August 2023; 16:00	Georgia	10–11	Italy	Modern Pentathlon Centre Swimming & Fencing Hall
6 August 2023; 16:00	Score by quarters: 3-1, 1-3, 2-3, 4-4			Modern Pentathlon Centre Swimming & Fencing Hall

- 5th to 8th place

6 August 2023; 10:45	China	5–19	Greece	Modern Pentathlon Centre Swimming & Fencing Hall
6 August 2023; 10:45	Score by quarters: 1–5, 2–4, 1–4, 1–6			Modern Pentathlon Centre Swimming & Fencing Hall

6 August 2023; 12:30	Germany	14–12	Japan	Modern Pentathlon Centre Swimming & Fencing Hall
6 August 2023; 12:30	Score by quarters: 4–2, 4–3, 2–2, 4–5			Modern Pentathlon Centre Swimming & Fencing Hall

==== Finals ====
- 7th/8th place match

7 August 2023; 11:45	China	9–7	Japan	Modern Pentathlon Centre Swimming & Fencing Hall
7 August 2023; 11:45	Score by quarters: 0-2, 4-1, 1-0, 4-4			Modern Pentathlon Centre Swimming & Fencing Hall

- 5th/6th place match

7 August 2023; 13:30	Greece	12–10	Germany	Modern Pentathlon Centre Swimming & Fencing Hall
7 August 2023; 13:30	Score by quarters: 2-3, 3-1, 3-2, 4-4			Modern Pentathlon Centre Swimming & Fencing Hall

- Bronze medal match

8 August 2023; 10:00	United States	7–12	Georgia	Modern Pentathlon Centre Swimming & Fencing Hall
8 August 2023; 10:00	Score by quarters: 1-3, 0-3, 3-3, 3-3			Modern Pentathlon Centre Swimming & Fencing Hall

- Gold medal match

8 August 2023; 12:00	Hungary	11–13	Italy	Modern Pentathlon Centre Swimming & Fencing Hall
8 August 2023; 12:00	Score by quarters: 3-6, 2-5, 1-2, 5-0			Modern Pentathlon Centre Swimming & Fencing Hall

== Final standing ==
Rank	Team
1st place, gold medalist(s)	Italy
2nd place, silver medalist(s)	Hungary
3rd place, bronze medalist(s)	Georgia
4	United States
5	Greece
6	Germany
7	China
8	Japan
9	Slovakia
10	South Korea
11	Singapore
