= Giorgi Magrakvelidze =

Georgian National water polo team

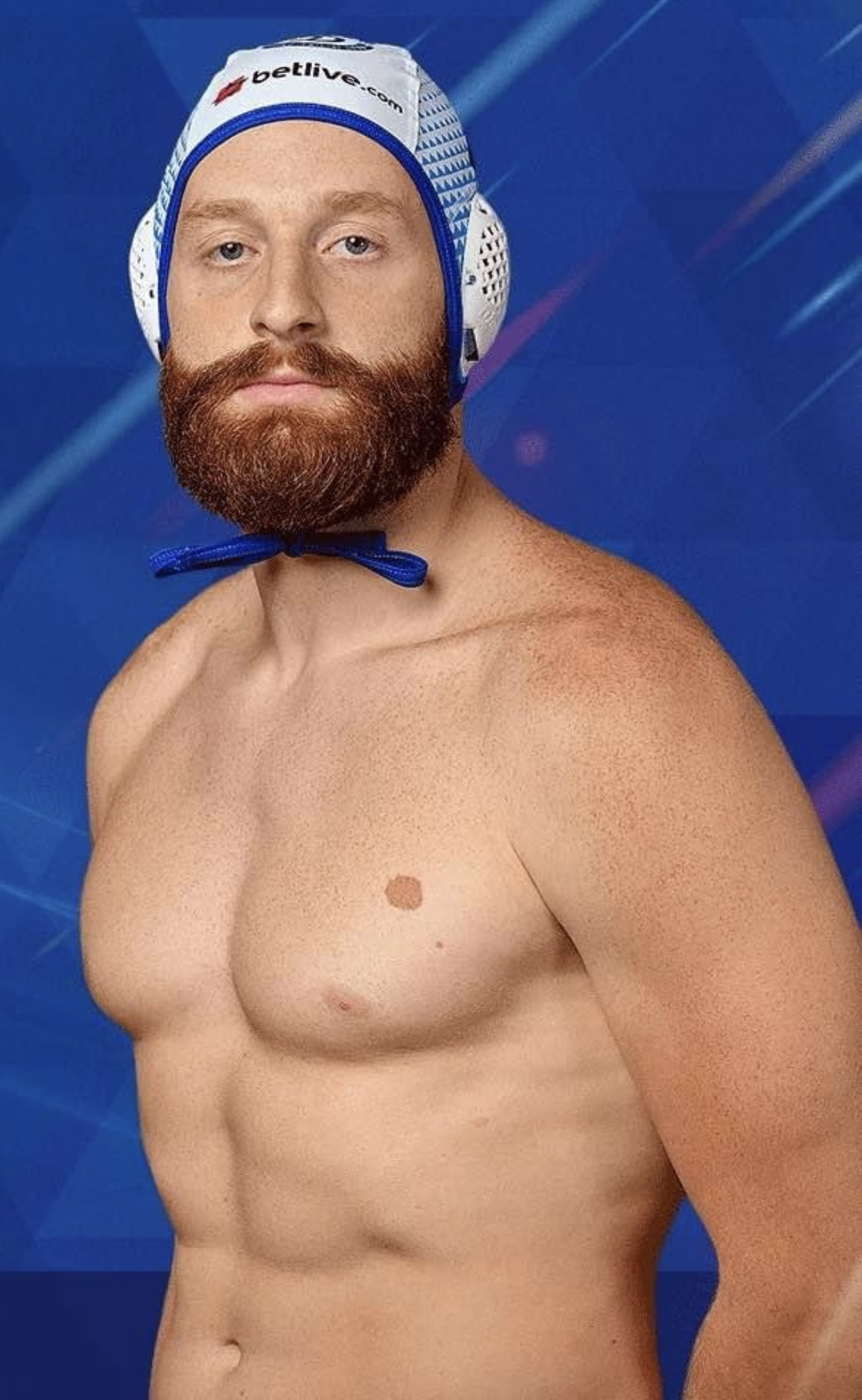

Personal information
- Nationality: Georgian
- Born: 21 January 1998 (age 28) Tbilisi, Georgia
- Height: 1.83 m (6 ft 0 in)
- Weight: 90 kg (198 lb)

Sport
- Sport: Water polo
- Position: Field player
- Current club: WPC Dinamo Tbilisi
- Number: 10

Senior clubs
- Years: Team
- KVP Novaky, WPC Dinamo Tbilisi
National team
- Years: Team
- 2015–: Georgia
Medal record
World University Games
Bronze medal – third place	2021 Chengdu	Team

Giorgi Magrakvelidze (born 21 January 1998) is a Georgian water polo player for WPC Dynamo Tbilisi and the Georgian national team.

He participated at the 2018 Men's European Water Polo Championship.
